= 1889 in tennis =

This page covers all the important events in the sport of tennis in 1889. It provides the results of notable tournaments throughout the year on both the men's and women's ILTF tennis circuits.

== Australian Open ==
No event.

== French Open ==
Not a Grand Slam event.

== Wimbledon ==
| Category | Champion(s) | Finalist(s) | Score |
|---|---|---|---|
| Men's singles | (United Kingdom) William Renshaw | (United Kingdom) Ernest Renshaw | 6–4, 6–1, 3–6, 6–0 |
| Women's singles | (United Kingdom) Blanche Hillyard | (United Kingdom) Lena Rice | 4–6, 8–6, 6–4 |
| Men's doubles | (United Kingdom) Ernest Renshaw (United Kingdom) William Renshaw | (United Kingdom) George Hillyard (United Kingdom) Ernest Lewis | 6–4, 6–4, 3–6, 0–6, 6–1 |

== US Open ==
| Category | Champion(s) | Finalist(s) | Score |
|---|---|---|---|
| Men's singles | (United States) Henry Slocum | (United States) Quincy Shaw | 6–3, 6–1, 4–6, 6–2 |
| Women's singles | (United States) Bertha Townsend | (United States) Lida Voorhees | 7–5, 6–2 |
| Men's doubles | (United States) Henry Slocum (United States) Howard Taylor | (United States) Valentine Hall (United States) Oliver Campbell | 6–1, 6–3, 6–2 |
| Women's doubles | (United States) Margarette Ballard (United States) Bertha Townsend | (United States) Marion Wright (United States) Laura Knight | 6–0, 6–2 |
