= List of US Open women's singles champions =

US Open women's singles champions
- Location: Queens – New York City; United States
- Venue: USTA Billie Jean King National Tennis Center
- Governing body: USTA
- Created: 1887; 139 years ago
- Editions: 139 events (2025); 58 events (Open Era)
- Surface: Grass (1887–1974); Clay (1975–1977); Hard (1978–present)
- Prize money: Total: US$60,102,000 (2022); Winner: US$2,600,000 (2022)
- Trophy: US Open Trophy
- Website: Official website

Most titles
- Amateur era: 8: Molla Bjurstedt Mallory
- Open era: 6: Chris Evert; 6: Serena Williams

Most consecutive titles
- Amateur era: 4: Molla Bjurstedt Mallory; 4: Helen Jacobs
- Open era: 4: Chris Evert

Current champion
- Elena Rybakina

The US Open women's singles championship is an annual tennis event that has been held since 1887 as part of the US Open (Note: Known as the U.S. National Championships during the Amateur Era.) (Note: The tournament entered the Open Era with the 1968 edition, allowing professional players to compete alongside amateurs.) tournament. The tournament is played on outdoor hard courts (Note: The US Open specifically uses DecoTurf hard courts, categorized as a "Medium" speed surface by the International Tennis Federation (ITF).) at the USTA Billie Jean King National Tennis Center in Flushing Meadows – Corona Park, New York City.

The US Open is played during a two-week period in late August and early September and has been chronologically the last of the four Grand Slam tournaments of the tennis year since 1987. The Philadelphia Cricket Club (1887–1920) and Forest Hills (1921–1977) hosted the event before it settled in 1978 at its current site. The United States Tennis Association is the national body that organizes this event.

The champion receives a full-size replica of the event's trophy engraved with her name. In 2026, the winner will receive a prize of US$5,500,000.

== History ==
The format of the women's singles event has undergone several changes since the first edition. From 1888 through 1918, the event started with a knockout phase, the All-Comers, whose winner faced the defending champion in a challenge round. The All-Comers winner was awarded the title by default eight times (1893, 1899, 1900, 1905, 1906, 1907, 1912 and 1915) in the absence of the previous year's champion. The challenge round system was abolished with the 1919 edition. Since 1887, all matches have been played as the best of three sets, except in the eleven-year period from 1891 to 1901, when the challenge round was scored the best of five sets. From 1894 to 1901, the women were required to play best of five sets in both the All-Comers final and the challenge round.

=== Format ===
Since 1887, the winner of the next game at five-games–all took the set in every match except the All-Comers final and the challenge round, which was won by the player who had won at least six games and at least two games more than his opponent. This advantage format was introduced for the final sets of early rounds, for women starting in 1887, and used for all sets in final rounds from 1887 through 1969. The tie-break system was introduced in 1970 for all sets, in its best-of-nine points sudden death version until 1974, and in its best-of-12 points lingering death version since 1975. The US Open is the only Grand Slam tournament to have a third set tie-break, which has occurred twice in women's singles finals in 1981 and in 1985.

=== Surface ===
The court surface changed twice, from grass (1887–1974), to Har-Tru clay (1975–1977), to hard courts since 1978. No women's tennis player won the event on all three surfaces, and no women's tennis player won it on both grass and clay. Chris Evert was the only one to win the event on clay and on hard court, thereby making her the only woman to win on two different surfaces at the event.

== Finals ==
Key

Regular competition
All Comers' winner, Challenge round winner ‡
Defending champion, Challenge round winner †
All Comers' winner, no Challenge round ◊

=== U.S. National Championships ===
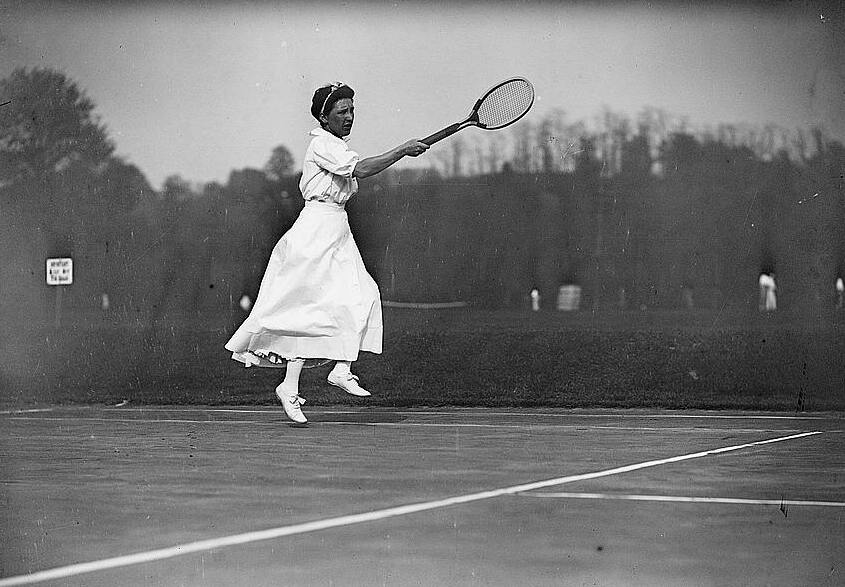
Elisabeth Moore is a four-time champion

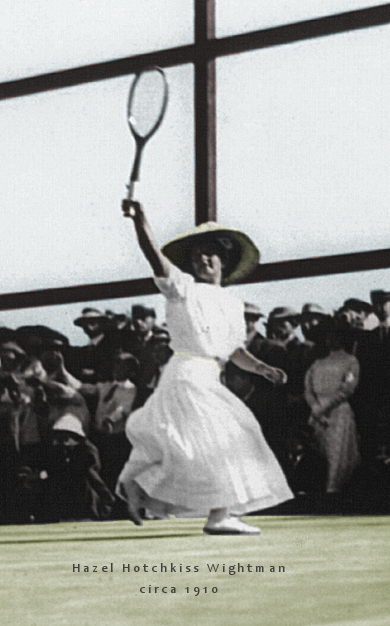
Hazel Hotchkiss Wightman is a four-time champion

Molla Bjurstedt Mallory's eight US singles championships is the all–time record among both men and women.

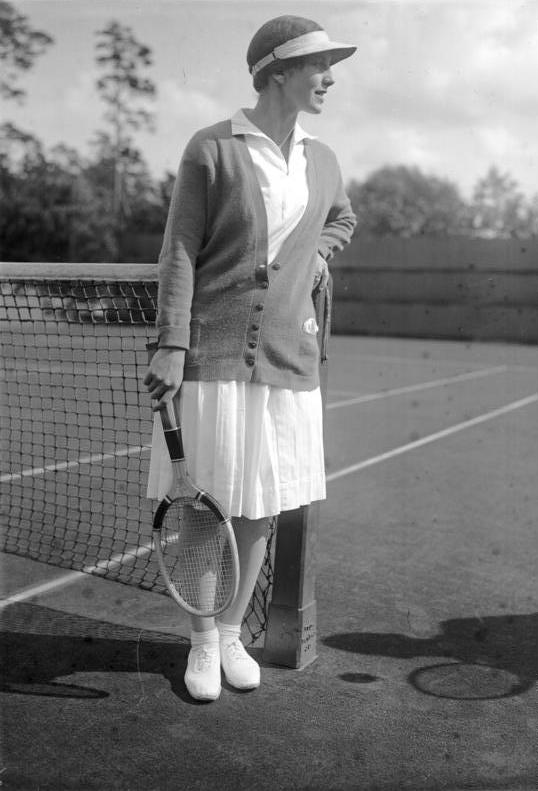
Helen Wills Moody is a seven-time champion

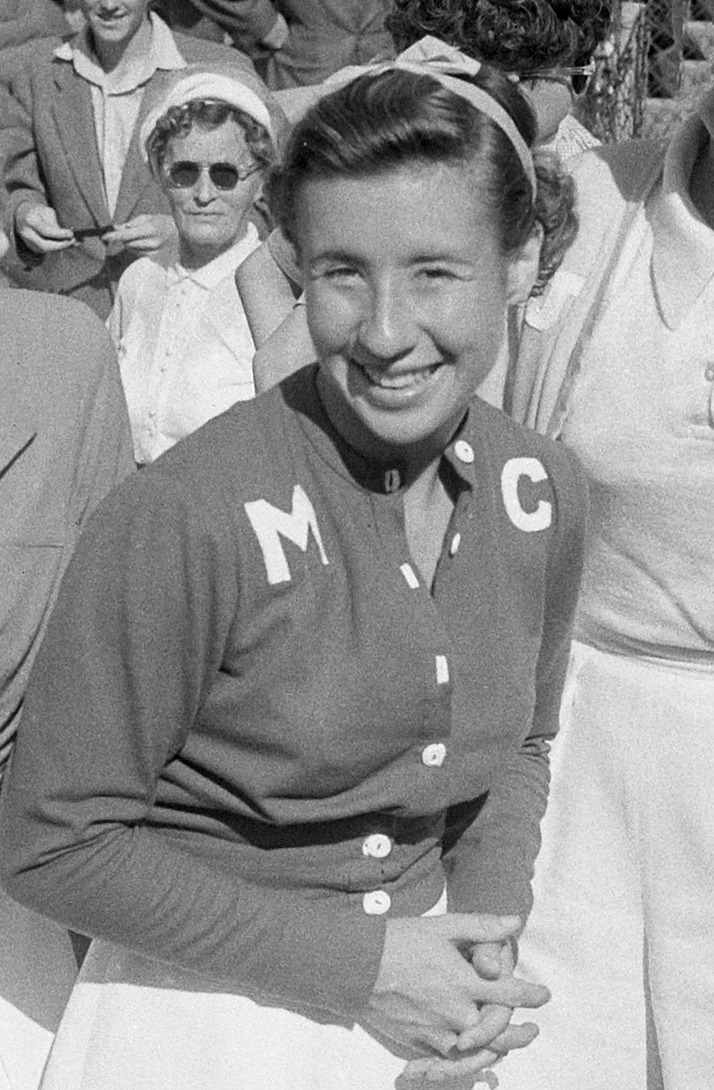
Maureen Connolly Brinker was a three-time champion

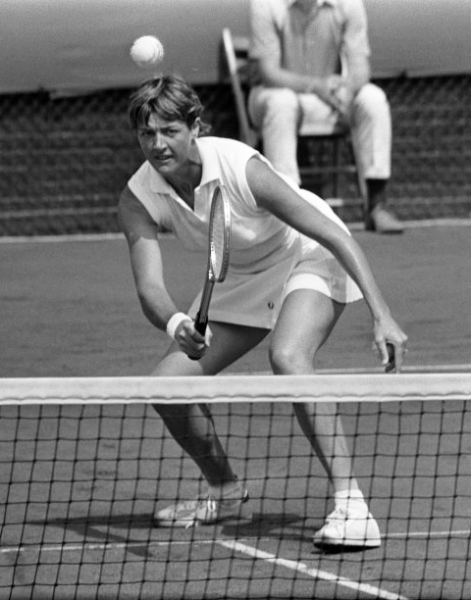
Margaret Court is a five time champion

Year (Note: Each year is linked to an article about that particular event's draw.)	Country	Champion	Country	Runner–up	Score
1887	USA	Ellen Hansell †	USA	Laura Knight	6–1, 6–0
1888	USA	Bertha Townsend (1/2) ‡	USA	Ellen Hansell	6–3, 6–5
1889	USA	Bertha Townsend (2/2) †	USA	Lida Voorhees	7–5, 6–2
1890	USA	Ellen Roosevelt ‡	USA	Bertha Townsend	6–2, 6–2
1891	BRI	Mabel Cahill (1/2) ‡	USA	Ellen Roosevelt	6–4, 6–1, 4–6, 6–3
1892	BRI	Mabel Cahill (2/2) †	USA	Elisabeth Moore	5–7, 6–3, 6–4, 4–6, 6–2
1893	USA	Aline Terry ◊	USA	Augusta Schultz	6–1, 6–3
1894	USA	Helen Hellwig ‡	USA	Aline Terry	7–5, 3–6, 6–0, 3–6, 6–3
1895	USA	Juliette Atkinson (1/3) ‡	USA	Helen Hellwig	6–4, 6–2, 6–1
1896	USA	Elisabeth Moore (1/4) ‡	USA	Juliette Atkinson	6–4, 4–6, 6–2, 6–2
1897	USA	Juliette Atkinson (2/3) ‡	USA	Elisabeth Moore	6–3, 6–3, 4–6, 3–6, 6–3
1898	USA	Juliette Atkinson (3/3) †	USA	Marion Jones	6–3, 5–7, 6–4, 2–6, 7–5
1899	USA	Marion Jones (1/2) ◊	USA	Maud Banks	6–1, 6–1, 7–5
1900	USA	Myrtle McAteer ◊	USA	Edith Parker	6–2, 6–2, 6–0
1901	USA	Elisabeth Moore (2/4) ‡	USA	Myrtle McAteer	6–4, 3–6, 7–5, 2–6, 6–2
1902	USA	Marion Jones (2/2) ‡	USA	Elisabeth Moore	6–1, 1–0, retired
1903	USA	Elisabeth Moore (3/4) ‡	USA	Marion Jones	7–5, 8–6
1904	USA	May Sutton ‡	USA	Elisabeth Moore	6–1, 6–2
1905	USA	Elisabeth Moore (4/4) ◊	USA	Helen Homans	6–4, 5–7, 6–1
1906	USA	Helen Homans ◊	USA	Maud Barger-Wallach	6–4, 6–3
1907	USA	Evelyn Sears ◊	USA	Carrie Neely	6–3, 6–2
1908	USA	Maud Barger-Wallach ‡	USA	Evelyn Sears	6–3, 1–6, 6–3
1909	USA	Hazel Hotchkiss Wightman (1/4) ‡	USA	Maud Barger-Wallach	6–0, 6–1
1910	USA	Hazel Hotchkiss Wightman (2/4) †	USA	Louise Hammond Raymond	6–4, 6–2
1911	USA	Hazel Hotchkiss Wightman (3/4) †	USA	Florence Sutton	8–10, 6–1, 9–7
1912	USA	Mary Browne (1/3) ◊	USA	Eleonora Sears	6–4, 6–2
1913	USA	Mary Browne (2/3) †	USA	Dorothy Green	6–2, 7–5
1914	USA	Mary Browne (3/3) †	USA	Marie Wagner	6–2, 1–6, 6–1
1915	NOR	Molla Bjurstedt (1/8) ◊	USA	Hazel Hotchkiss Wightman	4–6, 6–2, 6–0
1916	NOR	Molla Bjurstedt (2/8) †	USA	Louise Hammond Raymond	6–0, 6–1
1917 (Note: The 1917 U.S. National Championships, taking place during World War I, were held as a National Patriotic Tournament awarding no prize to the winner.)	NOR	Molla Bjurstedt (3/8) †	USA	Marion Vanderhoef	4–6, 6–0, 6–2
1918	NOR	Molla Bjurstedt (4/8) †	USA	Eleanor Goss	6–4, 6–3
1919	USA	Hazel Hotchkiss Wightman (4/4)	USA	Marion Zinderstein	6–1, 6–2
1920	USA	Molla Mallory (5/8)	USA	Marion Zinderstein	6–3, 6–1
1921	USA	Molla Mallory (6/8)	USA	Mary Browne	4–6, 6–4, 6–2
1922	USA	Molla Mallory (7/8)	USA	Helen Wills	6–3, 6–1
1923	USA	Helen Wills (1/7)	USA	Molla Mallory	6–2, 6–1
1924	USA	Helen Wills (2/7)	USA	Molla Mallory	6–1, 6–3
1925	USA	Helen Wills (3/7)	GBR	Kitty McKane Godfree	3–6, 6–0, 6–2
1926	USA	Molla Mallory (8/8)	USA	Elizabeth Ryan	4–6, 6–4, 9–7
1927	USA	Helen Wills (4/7)	GBR	Betty Nuthall	6–1, 6–4
1928	USA	Helen Wills (5/7)	USA	Helen Jacobs	6–2, 6–1
1929	USA	Helen Wills (6/7)	GBR	Phoebe Holcroft Watson	6–4, 6–2
1930	GBR	Betty Nuthall	USA	Anna McCune Harper	6–1, 6–4
1931	USA	Helen Wills Moody (7/7)	GBR	Eileen Bennett	6–4, 6–1
1932	USA	Helen Jacobs	USA	Carolin Babcock	6–2, 6–2
1933	USA	Helen Jacobs (2/4)	USA	Helen Wills Moody	8–6, 3–6, 3–0, retired
1934	USA	Helen Jacobs (3/4)	USA	Sarah Palfrey Cooke	6–1, 6–4
1935	USA	Helen Jacobs (4/4)	USA	Sarah Palfrey Cooke	6–2, 6–4
1936	USA	Alice Marble (1/4)	USA	Helen Jacobs	4–6, 6–3, 6–2
1937	CHI	Anita Lizana	POL	Jadwiga Jędrzejowska	6–4, 6–2
1938	USA	Alice Marble (2/4)	AUS	Nancye Wynne Bolton	6–0, 6–3
1939	USA	Alice Marble (3/4)	USA	Helen Jacobs	6–0, 8–10, 6–4
1940	USA	Alice Marble (4/4)	USA	Helen Jacobs	6–2, 6–3
1941	USA	Sarah Palfrey Cooke (1/2)	USA	Pauline Betz	7–5, 6–2
1942	USA	Pauline Betz (1/4)	USA	Louise Brough	4–6, 6–1, 6–4
1943	USA	Pauline Betz (2/4)	USA	Louise Brough	6–3, 5–7, 6–3
1944	USA	Pauline Betz (3/4)	USA	Margaret Osborne	6–3, 8–6
1945	USA	Sarah Palfrey Cooke (2/2)	USA	Pauline Betz	3–6, 8–6, 6–4
1946	USA	Pauline Betz (4/4)	USA	Doris Hart	11–9, 6–3
1947	USA	Louise Brough	USA	Margaret Osborne	8–6, 4–6, 6–1
1948	USA	Margaret Osborne (1/3)	USA	Louise Brough	4–6, 6–4, 15–13
1949	USA	Margaret Osborne (2/3)	USA	Doris Hart	6–3, 6–1
1950	USA	Margaret Osborne (3/3)	USA	Doris Hart	6–4, 6–3
1951	USA	Maureen Connolly (1/3)	USA	Shirley Fry	6–3, 1–6, 6–4
1952	USA	Maureen Connolly (2/3)	USA	Doris Hart	6–3, 7–5
1953	USA	Maureen Connolly (3/3)	USA	Doris Hart	6–2, 6–4
1954	USA	Doris Hart (1/2)	USA	Louise Brough	6–8, 6–1, 8–6
1955	USA	Doris Hart (2/2)	GBR	Patricia Ward Hales	6–4, 6–2
1956	USA	Shirley Fry	USA	Althea Gibson	6–3, 6–4
1957	USA	Althea Gibson (1/2)	USA	Louise Brough	6–3, 6–2
1958	USA	Althea Gibson (2/2)	USA	Darlene Hard	3–6, 6–1, 6–2
1959	BRA	Maria Bueno (1/4)	GBR	Christine Truman	6–1, 6–4
1960	USA	Darlene Hard (1/2)	BRA	Maria Bueno	6–4, 10–12, 6–4
1961	USA	Darlene Hard (2/2)	GBR	Ann Haydon	6–3, 6–4
1962	AUS	Margaret Smith (1/5)	USA	Darlene Hard	9–7, 6–4
1963	BRA	Maria Bueno (2/4)	AUS	Margaret Smith	7–5, 6–4
1964	BRA	Maria Bueno (3/4)	USA	Carole Caldwell Graebner	6–1, 6–0
1965	AUS	Margaret Smith (2/5)	USA	Billie Jean Moffitt	8–6, 7–5
1966	BRA	Maria Bueno (4/4)	USA	Nancy Richey	6–3, 6–1
1967	USA	Billie Jean King (1/4)	GBR	Ann Haydon Jones	11–9, 6–4

=== US Open ===
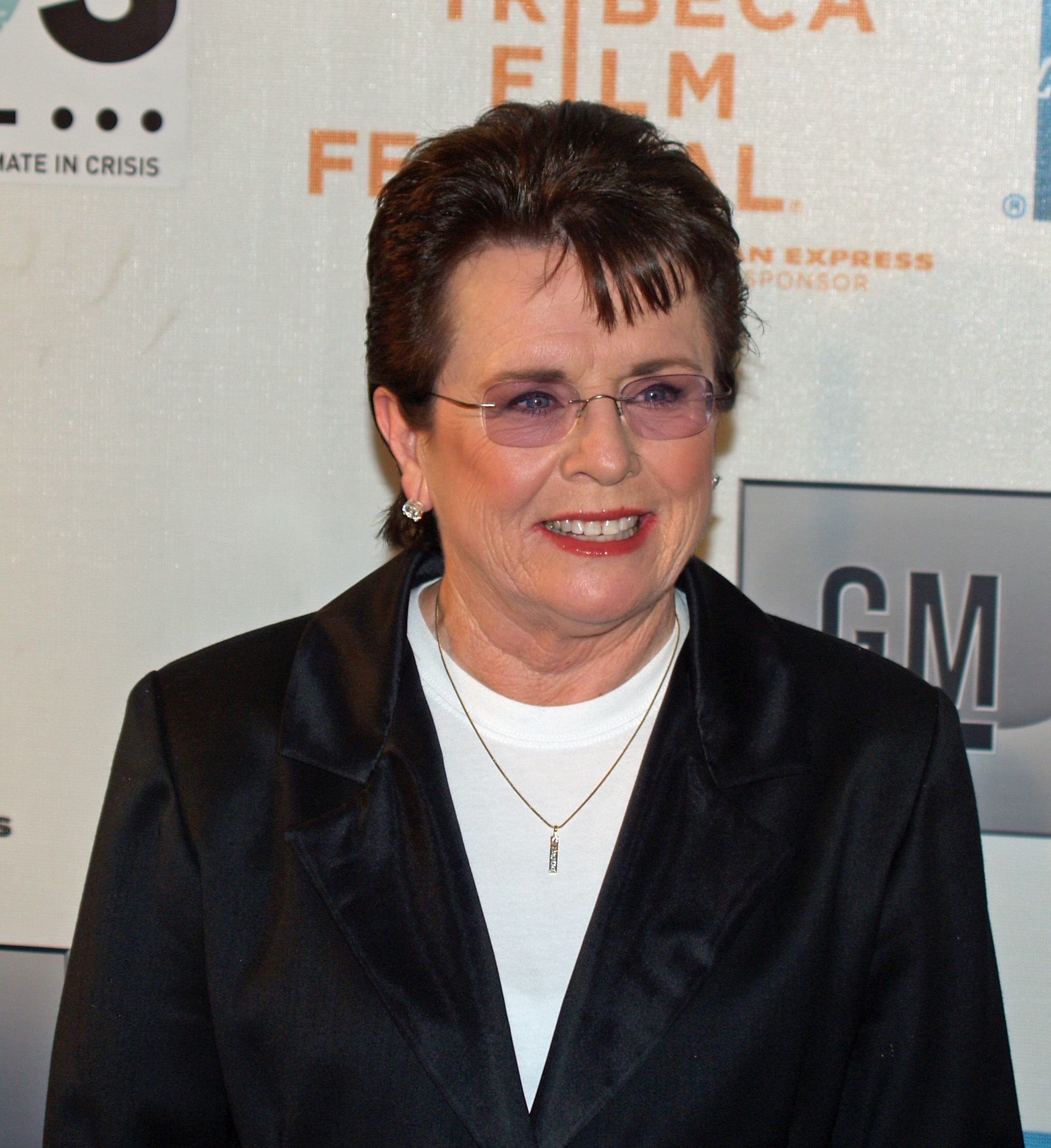
Billie Jean King is a four-time champion overall and a three-time champion in the open era, and won three in four-year timespan

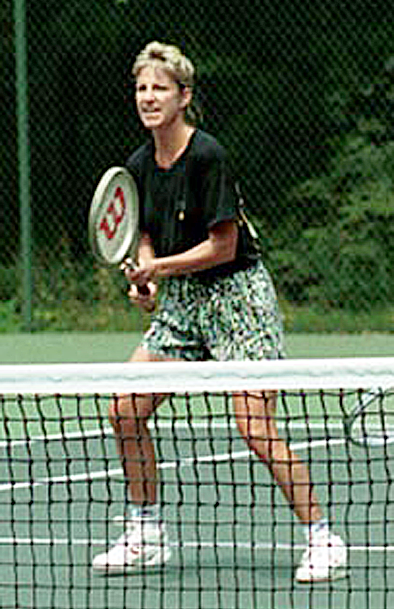
American Chris Evert won an Open Era record four consecutive titles at the US Open between 1975 and 1978, and a record six overall (shared with Serena Williams) with victories in 1980 and 1982.

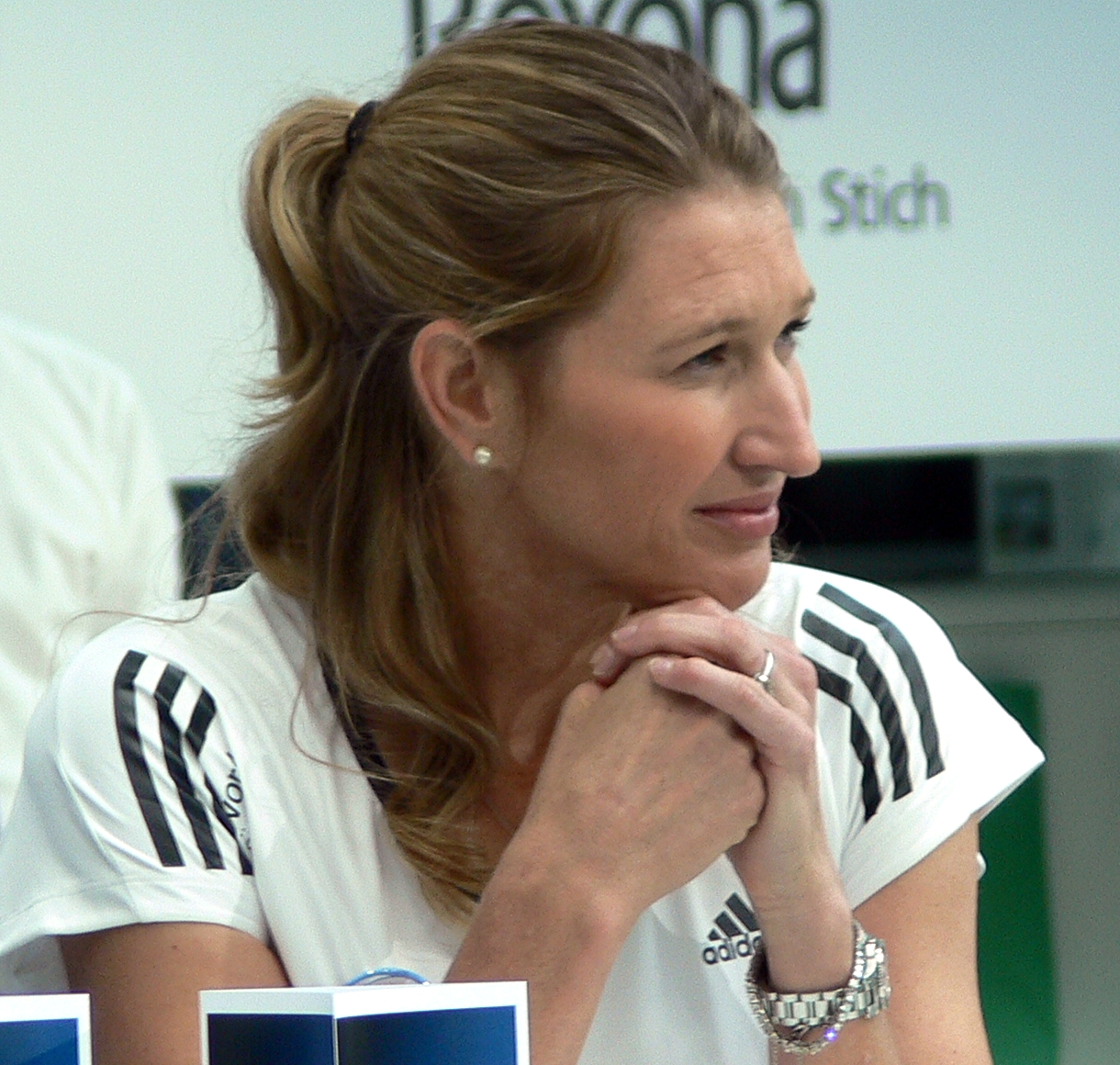
Steffi Graf is a five-time champion.

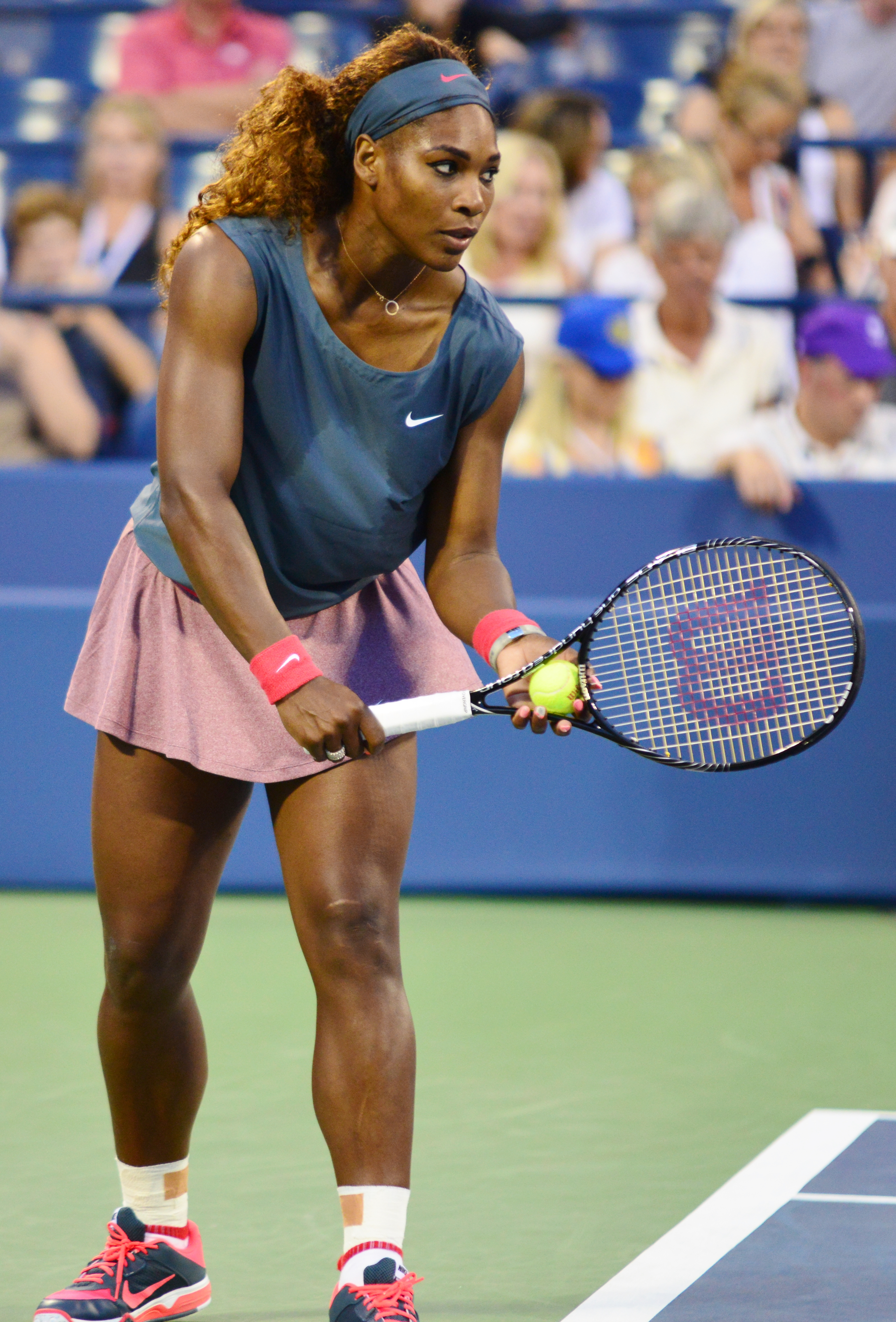
Serena Williams is a six-time champion, winning these over a fifteen-year period. She shares the Open Era titles record with Chris Evert.

Year	Country	Champion	Country	Runner-up	Score
1968	GBR	Virginia Wade	USA	Billie Jean King	6–4, 6–2
1969	AUS	Margaret Court (3/5)	USA	Nancy Richey	6–2, 6–2
1970	AUS	Margaret Court (4/5)	USA	Rosemary Casals	6–2, 2–6, 6–1
1971	USA	Billie Jean King (2/4)	USA	Rosemary Casals	6–4, 7–6^{(5–2)}
1972	USA	Billie Jean King (3/4)	AUS	Kerry Melville	6–3, 7–5
1973	AUS	Margaret Court (5/5)	AUS	Evonne Goolagong	7–6^{(5–2)}, 5–7, 6–2
1974	USA	Billie Jean King (4/4)	AUS	Evonne Goolagong	3–6, 6–3, 7–5
1975	USA	Chris Evert (1/6)	AUS	Evonne Goolagong	5–7, 6–4, 6–2
1976	USA	Chris Evert (2/6)	AUS	Evonne Goolagong	6–3, 6–0
1977	USA	Chris Evert (3/6)	AUS	Wendy Turnbull	7–6^{(7–3)}, 6–2
1978	USA	Chris Evert (4/6)	USA	Pam Shriver	7–5, 6–4
1979	USA	Tracy Austin (1/2)	USA	Chris Evert	6–4, 6–3
1980	USA	Chris Evert (5/6)	TCH (Note: Czechoslovakia (TCH, 1918–1992), evolved into Czech Republic (CZE, 1993–present) and Slovakia (SVK, 1993–present).)	Hana Mandlíková	5–7, 6–1, 6–1
1981	USA	Tracy Austin (2/2)	USA	Martina Navratilova (Note: Martina Navratilova was born in Czechoslovakia, but competed as an American after the US Open in 1975, having sought asylum in the United States, which made her relinquish her Czechoslovak citizenship.)	1–6, 7–6^{(7–4)}, 7–6^{(7–1)}
1982	USA	Chris Evert (6/6)	TCH	Hana Mandlíková	6–3, 6–1
1983	USA	Martina Navratilova (1/4)	USA	Chris Evert	6–1, 6–3
1984	USA	Martina Navratilova (2/4)	USA	Chris Evert	4–6, 6–4, 6–4
1985	TCH	Hana Mandlíková	USA	Martina Navratilova	7–6^{(7–3)}, 1–6, 7–6^{(7–2)}
1986	USA	Martina Navratilova (3/4)	TCH	Helena Suková	6–3, 6–2
1987	USA	Martina Navratilova (4/4)	FRG	Steffi Graf	7–6^{(7–4)}, 6–1
1988	FRG (Note: FRG was West Germany, but after unification in 1990 became just Germany (GER).)	Steffi Graf (1/5)	ARG	Gabriela Sabatini	6–3, 3–6, 6–1
1989	FRG	Steffi Graf (2/5)	USA	Martina Navratilova	3–6, 7–5, 6–1
1990	ARG	Gabriela Sabatini	FRG	Steffi Graf	6–2, 7–6^{(7–4)}
1991	YUG	Monica Seles (1/2)	USA	Martina Navratilova	7–6^{(7–1)}, 6–1
1992	YUG (Note: FR Yugoslavia (YUG, 1992–2003) and Serbia and Montenegro (SCG, 2003–2006), evolved into Serbia (SRB, 2006–present) and Montenegro (MNE, 2006–present).)	Monica Seles (2/2)	ESP	Arantxa Sánchez Vicario	6–3, 6–3
1993	GER	Steffi Graf (3/5)	CZE	Helena Suková	6–3, 6–3
1994	ESP	Arantxa Sánchez Vicario	GER	Steffi Graf	1–6, 7–6^{(7–3)}, 6–4
1995	GER	Steffi Graf (4/5)	USA	Monica Seles	7–6^{(8–6)}, 0–6, 6–3
1996	GER	Steffi Graf (5/5)	USA	Monica Seles	7–5, 6–4
1997	SUI	Martina Hingis	USA	Venus Williams	6–0, 6–4
1998	USA	Lindsay Davenport	SUI	Martina Hingis	6–3, 7–5
1999	USA	Serena Williams (1/6)	SUI	Martina Hingis	6–3, 7–6^{(7–4)}
2000	USA	Venus Williams (1/2)	USA	Lindsay Davenport	6–4, 7–5
2001	USA	Venus Williams (2/2)	USA	Serena Williams	6–2, 6–4
2002	USA	Serena Williams (2/6)	USA	Venus Williams	6–4, 6–3
2003	BEL	Justine Henin (1/2)	BEL	Kim Clijsters	7–5, 6–1
2004	RUS	Svetlana Kuznetsova	RUS	Elena Dementieva	6–3, 7–5
2005	BEL	Kim Clijsters (1/3)	FRA	Mary Pierce	6–3, 6–1
2006	RUS	Maria Sharapova	BEL	Justine Henin	6–4, 6–4
2007	BEL	Justine Henin (2/2)	RUS	Svetlana Kuznetsova	6–1, 6–3
2008	USA	Serena Williams (3/6)	SRB	Jelena Janković	6–4, 7–5
2009	BEL	Kim Clijsters (2/3)	DEN	Caroline Wozniacki	7–5, 6–3
2010	BEL	Kim Clijsters (3/3)	RUS	Vera Zvonareva	6–2, 6–1
2011	AUS	Samantha Stosur	USA	Serena Williams	6–2, 6–3
2012	USA	Serena Williams (4/6)	BLR	Victoria Azarenka	6–2, 2–6, 7–5
2013	USA	Serena Williams (5/6)	BLR	Victoria Azarenka	7–5, 6–7^{(6–8)}, 6–1
2014	USA	Serena Williams (6/6)	DEN	Caroline Wozniacki	6–3, 6–3
2015	ITA	Flavia Pennetta	ITA	Roberta Vinci	7–6^{(7–4)}, 6–2
2016	GER	Angelique Kerber	CZE	Karolína Plíšková	6–3, 4–6, 6–4
2017	USA	Sloane Stephens	USA	Madison Keys	6–3, 6–0
2018	JPN	Naomi Osaka (1/2)	USA	Serena Williams	6–2, 6–4
2019	CAN	Bianca Andreescu	USA	Serena Williams	6–3, 7–5
2020	JPN	Naomi Osaka (2/2)	BLR	Victoria Azarenka	1–6, 6–3, 6–3
2021	GBR	Emma Raducanu	CAN	Leylah Fernandez	6–4, 6–3
2022	POL	Iga Świątek	TUN	Ons Jabeur	6–2, 7–6^{(7–5)}
2023	USA	Coco Gauff	(Note: Although Sabalenka is from Belarus (BLR), she competed under no flag due to the Russian invasion of Ukraine.)	Aryna Sabalenka	2–6, 6–3, 6–2
2024		Aryna Sabalenka (1/2)	USA	Jessica Pegula	7–5, 7–5
2025		Aryna Sabalenka (2/2)	USA	Amanda Anisimova	6–3, 7–6^{(7–3)}
2026	KAZ	Elena Rybakina		Aryna Sabalenka	6–4, 5–7, 6–2

== Statistics ==
In the U.S. National Championships, under the Challenge Round format, Elisabeth Moore (1896, 1901, 1903, 1905) and Molla Bjurstedt Mallory (1915–1918) hold the record for the most titles in singles with 4, with Molla Mallory's streak also being the record for the most consecutive titles in singles during this phase (and all-time too). Hazel Hotchkiss Wightman also won 3 titles during the aforementioned phase (1909-1911) and 1 additional title after its abolition (1919), for a total of 4 titles overall.

Molla Bjurstedt Mallory's 8 titles in singles (1915–1918, 1920–1922, 1926) is the all-time record.

With 4 consecutive titles in singles, Helen Jacobs (1932–1935) tied the record for the most consecutive women's titles in singles won all-time. In Jacobs's case, she won all of her titles after the Challenge Round format was abolished. The other players who were able to win 4 titles before the beginning of the Open Era are: Alice Marble (1936, 1938-1940), Pauline Betz (1942-1944, 1946) and Maria Bueno (1959, 1963-1964, 1966).

During the US Open, since the inclusion of the professional tennis players, Chris Evert (1975–1978) tied Molla Mallory and Helen Jacobs's all-time record for the most consecutive women's titles in singles at 4. However, Chris Evert also holds the record for the most titles overall at 6 (1975–1978, 1980, 1982) in the Open Era, which was later tied by Serena Williams (1999, 2002, 2008, 2012–2014).

This event has been won without losing a set during the Open Era by Margaret Court in 1969, Billie Jean King in 1971 and 1972, Evert in 1976, 1977 and 1978, Martina Navratilova in 1983 and 1987, Monica Seles in 1992, Steffi Graf in 1996, Martina Hingis in 1997, Lindsay Davenport in 1998, Venus Williams in 2001, Serena Williams in 2002, 2008 and 2014, Justine Henin in 2007 and Emma Raducanu in 2021.

=== Multiple champions ===
Title defended in the challenge round

Player	Amateur Era	Open Era	All-time	Years
Molla Bjurstedt Mallory (USA) (NOR)	8	0	8	1915, 1916, 1917, 1918, 1920, 1921, 1922, 1926
Helen Wills Moody (USA)	7	0	7	1923, 1924, 1925, 1927, 1928, 1929, 1931
Chris Evert (USA)	0	6	6	1975, 1976, 1977, 1978, 1980, 1982
Serena Williams (USA)	0	6	6	1999, 2002, 2008, 2012, 2013, 2014
Margaret Court (AUS)	2	3	5	1962, 1965, 1969, 1970, 1973
Steffi Graf (GER)	0	5	5	1988, 1989, 1993, 1995, 1996
Elisabeth Moore (USA)	4	0	4	1896, 1901, 1903, 1905
Hazel Hotchkiss Wightman (USA)	4	0	4	1909, 1910, 1911, 1919
Helen Jacobs (USA)	4	0	4	1932, 1933, 1934, 1935
Alice Marble (USA)	4	0	4	1936, 1938, 1939, 1940
Pauline Betz (USA)	4	0	4	1942, 1943, 1944, 1946
Maria Bueno (BRA)	4	0	4	1959, 1963, 1964, 1966
Billie Jean King (USA)	1	3	4	1967, 1971, 1972, 1974
Martina Navratilova (USA)	0	4	4	1983, 1984, 1986, 1987
Juliette Atkinson (USA)	3	0	3	1895, 1897, 1898
Mary Browne (USA)	3	0	3	1912, 1913, 1914
Margaret Osborne duPont (USA)	3	0	3	1948, 1949, 1950
Maureen Connolly (USA)	3	0	3	1951, 1952, 1953
Kim Clijsters (BEL)	0	3	3	2005, 2009, 2010
Bertha Townsend (USA)	2	0	2	1888, 1889
Mabel Cahill (GBR)	2	0	2	1891, 1892
Marion Jones (USA)	2	0	2	1899, 1902
Sarah Palfrey Cooke (USA)	2	0	2	1941, 1945
Doris Hart (USA)	2	0	2	1954, 1955
Althea Gibson (USA)	2	0	2	1957, 1958
Darlene Hard (USA)	2	0	2	1960, 1961
Tracy Austin (USA)	0	2	2	1979, 1981
Monica Seles (YUG) (FRY)	0	2	2	1991, 1992
Venus Williams (USA)	0	2	2	2000, 2001
Justine Henin (BEL)	0	2	2	2003, 2007
Naomi Osaka (JPN)	0	2	2	2018, 2020
Aryna Sabalenka (blank)	0	2	2	2024, 2025

=== Champions by country ===
Country	Amateur Era	Open Era	All-time	First title	Last title
United States	67	26	93	1887	2023
Australia	2	4	6	1962	2011
Germany	0	6	6	1988	2016
Belgium	0	5	5	2003	2010
Great Britain (Note: Includes two wins by players from the United Kingdom of Great Britain and Ireland (1801–1922).)	3	2	5	1891	2021
Brazil	4	0	4	1959	1966
Norway	4	0	4	1915	1918
Yugoslavia; FR Yugoslavia	0	2	2	1991	1992
Russia	0	2	2	2004	2006
Japan	0	2	2	2018	2020
Argentina	0	1	1	1990	1990
Italy	0	1	1	2015	2015
Canada	0	1	1	2019	2019
Chile	1	0	1	1937	1937
Czechoslovakia	0	1	1	1985	1985
Kazakhstan	0	1	1	2026	2026
Poland	0	1	1	2022	2022
Spain	0	1	1	1994	1994
Switzerland	0	1	1	1997	1997

== See also ==
US Open other competitions

- List of US Open men's singles champions
- List of US Open men's doubles champions
- List of US Open women's doubles champions
- List of US Open mixed doubles champions

Grand Slam women's singles

- List of Australian Open women's singles champions
- List of French Open women's singles champions
- List of Wimbledon ladies' singles champions
- List of Grand Slam women's singles champions
