= 1890 in tennis =

This page covers all the important events in the sport of tennis in 1890. It provides the results of notable tournaments throughout the year on both the men's and women's ILTF tennis circuits.

== Australian Open ==
No event.

== French Open ==
Not a Grand Slam event.

== Wimbledon ==
Category	Champion(s)	Finalist(s)	Score
Men's singles	(United Kingdom) Willoughby Hamilton	(United Kingdom) William Renshaw	6–8, 6–2, 3–6, 6–1, 6–1.
Women's singles	(United Kingdom) Lena Rice	(United Kingdom) May Jacks	6–4, 6–1.
Men's doubles	(United Kingdom) Joshua Pim (United Kingdom) Frank Stoker	(United Kingdom) George Hillyard (United Kingdom) Ernest Lewis	6–0, 7–5, 6–4.

== US Open ==
Category	Champion(s)	Finalist(s)	Score
Men's singles	(United States) Oliver Campbell	(United States) Henry Slocum	6–2, 4–6, 6–3, 6–1
Women's singles	(United States) Ellen Roosevelt	(United States) Bertha Townsend	6–2, 6–2
Men's doubles	(United States) Valentine Hall (United States) Clarence Hobart	(United States) Charles Carver (United States) John Ryerson	6–3, 4–6, 6–2, 2–6, 6–3
Women's doubles	(United States) Grace Roosevelt (United States) Ellen Roosevelt	(United States) Bertha Townsend (United States) Margarette Ballard	6–1, 6–2
