= 1888 in tennis =

This page covers all the important events in the sport of tennis in 1888. It provides the results of notable tournaments throughout the year on both the men's and women's ILTF tennis circuits.

== Australian Open ==
No event.

== French Open ==
Not a Grand Slam event.

== Wimbledon ==
Category	Champion(s)	Finalist(s)	Score
Men's singles	(United Kingdom) Ernest Renshaw	(United Kingdom) Herbert Lawford	6–3, 7–5, 6–0
Women's singles	(United Kingdom) Lottie Dod	(United Kingdom) Blanche Hillyard	6–3, 6–3
Men's doubles	(United Kingdom) Ernest Renshaw (United Kingdom) William Renshaw	(United Kingdom) Patrick Bowes-Lyon (United Kingdom) Herbert Wilberforce	2–6, 1–6, 6–3, 6–4, 6–3

== US Open ==
Category	Champion(s)	Finalist(s)	Score
Men's singles	(United States) Henry Slocum	(United States) Howard Taylor	6–4, 6–1, 6–0
Women's singles	(United States) Bertha Townsend	(United States) Ellen Hansell	6–3, 6–5
Men's doubles	(United States) Oliver Campbell (United States) Valentine Hall	(United States) Clarence Hobart (United States) Edward MacMullen	6–4, 6–2, 6–2
