= 1889 in sports =

1889 in sports describes the year's events in world sport.

== Track and Field ==
- USA Outdoor Track and Field Championships

== American football ==
College championship

- College football national championship – Princeton Tigers

== Association football ==
Denmark

- Formation of the Danish Football Union (Dansk Boldspil-Union or DBU)

England

- The Football League – Preston North End 40 points, Aston Villa 29, Wolves 28, Blackburn Rovers 26, Bolton Wanderers 22, West Bromwich Albion 22
- FA Cup final – Preston North End 3–0 Wolverhampton Wanderers at The Oval.
- Preston North Ends wins the inaugural Football League championship unbeaten, an achievement that will not be equalled until 2003–04 by Arsenal. Preston also wins the FA Cup to become the first team ever to complete The Double. The team earns the nickname of "Invincibles".
- The Football Alliance is founded as a rival to the Football League. It is short-lived and collapses in 1892 when the Football League expands. The Alliance is brokered by Sheffield Wednesday president John Holmes. Founder members include Sheffield Wednesday, Newton Heath (Manchester United), Nottingham Forest, Small Heath (Birmingham City) and Grimsby Town. Ardwick (Manchester City) will join in 1891 for the final season.
- Sheffield United is founded. With Sheffield Wednesday having left Bramall Lane in 1887, the management committee of the Bramall Lane complex decides to form a new football club at the ground, using Sheffield United Cricket Club as its basis. Bramall Lane is the world's oldest professional football venue, though not the longest in continuous use (which is Deepdale).
- The 1889–90 Football League season features the same 12 teams as in 1888–89.

Netherlands

- 8 December — formation of the Royal Dutch Football Association (i.e., the Koninklijke Nederlandse Voetbalbond or KNVB).

Scotland

- Scottish Cup final – Third Lanark 2–1 Celtic (replay; the SFA declared the original match void due to adverse conditions). Celtic reaches the Scottish Cup final in the club's inaugural season.

== Australian Rules Football ==
- Victorian Football Association premiers - South Melbourne
- SANFL premiers - Norwood
- WAFL premiers - Unions

== Baseball ==
National championship

- National League v. American Association – New York Giants (NL) defeats Brooklyn Dodgers (AA) 6 games to 3.

== Boxing ==
Events

- 8 July — John L. Sullivan defeats Jake Kilrain after 75 rounds in the last major bareknuckle contest. Some authorities recognise it as a world title contest although it is fought under London Prize Ring Rules rather than the now-accepted Queensberry Rules.

Lineal world champions

- World Heavyweight Championship – John L. Sullivan
- World Middleweight Championship – Jack Nonpareil Dempsey
- World Welterweight Championship – Paddy Duffy
- World Lightweight Championship – Jack McAuliffe

== Canadian Football ==
- The Dominion Championship is not held this year.
- Ontario Rugby Football Union champions - Ottawa College. After defeating Queens University twice and Toronto once, Ottawa is scheduled to play a second game against Toronto. The Ottawa players see this as unnecessary as they had already defeated them in the first game. Ottawa yields the cup rather than play the match, but Toronto refuses to accept it without the two teams meeting in the second game. Ottawa is declared champions for the fifth straight year
- Quebec Rugby Football Union champions - Montreal.
- Winnipeg wins the first Northwest Championship, a tournament for teams in Manitoba and the Northwest Territories.

== Cricket ==
Events

- 12–13 March — South Africa plays its inaugural Test match against the touring England national cricket team. England wins by 8 wickets. The match also marks the beginning of first-class cricket in South Africa where the Currie Cup is inaugurated as the premier domestic competition.
- The number of balls per over in England is increased from four to five. The four-ball over has been used since time immemorial.
- The major English county cricket clubs meet to agree a way of deciding an order of ranking for the next season; the official County Championship is established.

England

- Champion County – Surrey, Lancashire and Nottinghamshire share the title
- Most runs – W. G. Grace 1,396 @ 32.46 (HS 154)
- Most wickets – George Lohmann 202 @ 13.43 (BB 9–67)
- Wisden Nine Great Batsmen of the Year – Bobby Abel, Billy Barnes, Billy Gunn, Louis Hall, Robert Henderson, Maurice Read, Arthur Shrewsbury, Frank Sugg, Albert Ward

Australia

- Most runs – Harry Trott 507 @ 39.00 (HS 172)
- Most wickets – John Ferris 36 @ 15.83 (BB 6–62)

== Golf ==
Major tournaments

- British Open – Willie Park junior

Other tournaments

- British Amateur – Johnny Laidlay

== Horse racing ==
England

- Grand National – Frigate
- 1,000 Guineas Stakes – Minthe
- 2,000 Guineas Stakes – Enthusiast
- The Derby – Donovan
- The Oaks – L'Abbesse de Jouarre
- St. Leger Stakes – Donovan

Australia

- Melbourne Cup – Bravo

Canada

- Queen's Plate – Colonist

Ireland

- Irish Grand National – The Citadel
- Irish Derby Stakes – Tragedy

USA

- Kentucky Derby – Spokane
- Preakness Stakes – Buddhist
- Belmont Stakes – Eric

== Ice hockey ==
Events

- 27 March — Montreal Hockey Club defeats Montreal Victorias 6–1 in the final challenge of the season to win the 1889 AHAC championship

== Rowing ==
The Boat Race

- 30 March — Cambridge wins the 46th Oxford and Cambridge Boat Race

== Rugby football ==
Home Nations Championship

- The 7th series is won by Scotland following victories over both Ireland and Wales.

== Tennis ==
England

- Wimbledon Men's Singles Championship – William Renshaw (GB) defeats Ernest Renshaw (GB) 6–4 6–1 3–6 6–0
- Wimbledon Women's Singles Championship – Blanche Bingley Hillyard (GB) defeats Lena Rice (GB) 4–6 8–6 6–4

USA

- American Men's Singles Championship – Henry Slocum (USA) defeats Quincy Shaw (USA) 6–3 6–1 4–6 6–2
- American Women's Singles Championship – Bertha Townsend (USA) defeats Lida Voorhees (USA) 7–5 6–2
