= New Hamburg Invitation =

Defunct tennis tournament
- Tour: USNLTA Circuit
- Founded: 1887; 138 years ago
- Abolished: 1891; 134 years ago
- Location: New Hamburg, New York United States
- Venue: New Hamburg Lawn Tennis Club
- Surface: Grass

The New Hamburg Invitation was a men's and women's grass court tennis tournament founded in 1887. It was played at the New Hamburg Lawn Tennis Club, New Hamburg, New York, United States through till 1890 when it was discontinued.

== History ==
The New Hamburg Lawn Tennis Club was founded in 1886 and was a member of the Hudson River Tennis Association. In 1887 the club held an invitation only tennis tournament in late September in Poughkeepsie, New York. The tournament continued to be staged in Poughkeepsie until 1889, when it was moved to New Hamburg, New York for the duration of its run in 1891.

== Finals ==
=== Men's singles ===
(Incomplete roll)

Year	Champions	Runners-up	Score
1887	(United States) Valentine Gill Hall	(United States) Oliver Samuel Campbell	6–4, 4–6, 6–2, 6–3.
1888	(United States) Oliver Samuel Campbell	(United States) Edward Ludlow Hall	4–6, 7–5, 7–5, 11–9.
1889	(United States) Charles Edward Sands	(United States) Oliver Samuel Campbell	6–2, 4–6, 6–3, 8–6.
1890	(United States) Edward Ludlow Hall	(United States) A.W. Post	4–6, 8–6, 6–1, 7–5.

=== Men's doubles ===
(Incomplete roll)

Year	Champions	Runners-up	Score
1887	(United States) Mr. J.F. Bacon (United States) Charles Edward Sands		won.
1888	(United States) A.W. Post (United States) Edward Ludlow Hall	(United States) Charles Edward Sands (United States) Mr. R.G. Sands	6–4, 0–6, 6–4, 6–3

=== Women's singles ===
(Incomplete roll)

Year	Champions	Runners-up	Score
1887	(United States) May Colby	(United States) Sadie Steele	won.
1888	(United States) Ellen Roosevelt	(United States) May Colby	won.
1889	(United States) Miss R.L. Clarkson	(United States) Grace Roosevelt	6–8, 6–3, 6–2

=== Women's doubles ===
(Incomplete roll)

Year	Champions	Runners-up	Score
1887	(United States) Ellen Roosevelt (United States) Grace Roosevelt	(United States) V. Hobart (United States) Camilla Moss	won.

=== Mixed doubles ===
(Incomplete roll)

Year	Champions	Runners-up	Score
1890	(United States) Malcolm Greene Chace (United States) Ellen Roosevelt	(United States) Charles Edward Sands (United States) Miss Lente	6–4, 6–4, 6–4.
