= Narragansett Open =

Defunct tennis tournament
- Founded: 1885; 140 years ago
- Abolished: 1909; 116 years ago
- Location: Narragansett, Rhode Island, United States
- Venue: Narragansette Pier Courts; Point Judith Country Club
- Surface: Clay

The Narragansett Open was a tennis tournament founded in 1885 as the Narragansett Pier Open and played at the Narragansett Pier Courts, Narragansett, Rhode Island, United States that ran until 1909.

== History ==
The Narragansett Pier Open was a tennis tournament first established in 1885 at the Narragansett Pier Courts, Narragansett, Rhode Island, United States. In 1894 the new Point Judith Country Club was established and took over responsibility for hosting the Narragansette Pier Open. the tournament ran until 1909.

Notable winners of the men's singles title included Walter Van Rensselaer Berry, Howard Augustus Taylor, Oliver Samuel Campbell. Quincy Shaw, Malcolm Greene Chace and John Howland.

== Finals ==
=== Men's singles ===
(Incomplete Roll)

Narragansette Pier Open
Year	Winners	Runners-up	Score
1885	(United States) Walter Van Rensselaer Berry	(United States) Albert Empie Wright	6–3, 6–2, 6–2.
1887	(United States) Walter Van Rensselaer Berry (2)	(United States) Albert Empie Wright	6–3, 6–3, 6–1.
1888	(United States) Howard Augustus Taylor	(United States) Henry Slocum	6–4, 8–6, 7–5.
1889	(United States) Quincy Shaw	(United States) Howard Augustus Taylor	6–4, 6–4, 6–1.
1890	(United States) Oliver Samuel Campbell	(United States) John W. Carver	8–6, 1–6, 6–4, 5–7, 6–3.
1893	(United States) Malcolm Greene Chace	(United States) William Larned	6–4, 3–6, 6–8, 6–1, 6–0.
1894	(United States) John Howland	(United Kingdom) Manliffe Francis Goodbody	4–6, 6–3, 6–4, 6–2.
1895	(United States) William Larned	(United States) Malcolm Greene Chace	2–6, 6–4, 6–3, 7–5.
1899	(United States) Mal Whitman	(United States) John Appleton Allen	8–6, 3–6, 6–2, 6–4.
1900	(United States) Clarence R. Budlong	(United States) Jahial Parmly Paret	5–7, 6–4, 6–3, 6–3.

=== Women's singles ===
(Incomplete Roll)

Narragansette Pier Open
Year	Winners	Runners-up	Score
1888	(United States) Adeline Robinson	(United States) Ellen Roosevelt	6–0, 6–1, 6–0
