= 1890 U.S. National Championships (tennis) =

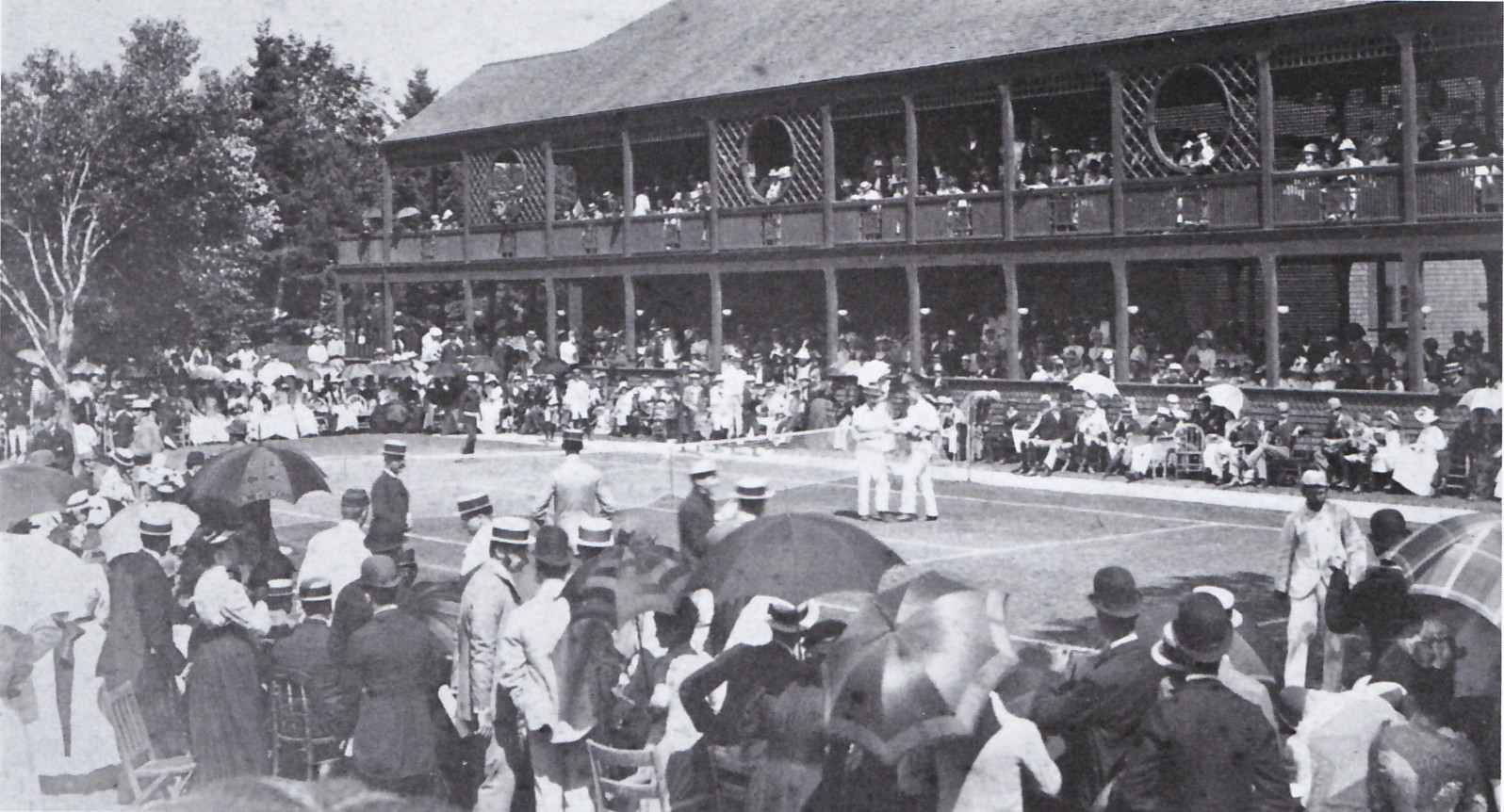
- Date: August 18–27 (M); June 10–13 (W)
- Edition: 10th
- Category: Grand Slam
- Surface: Grass
- Location: Newport, R.I., United States (M); Philadelphia, PA, United States (W)

Champions

Men's singles
- (United States) Oliver Campbell

Women's singles
- (United States) Ellen Roosevelt

Men's doubles
- (United States) Valentine Hall / (United States) Oliver Campbell

Women's doubles
- (United States) Grace Roosevelt / (United States) Ellen Roosevelt
- U.S. National Championships

The 1890 U.S. National Championships (now known as the US Open) was a tennis tournament that took place from June to August 1890. The women's singles and doubles competitions were held from June 10 to June 13 on the outdoor grass courts at the Philadelphia Cricket Club in Philadelphia, Pennsylvania. The men's singles and doubles competitions were held from August 18 to August 27 on the outdoor grass courts at the Newport Casino in Newport, Rhode Island. It was the 10th U.S. National Championships and the second Grand Slam tournament of the year.

== Finals ==
=== Men's singles ===
(United States) Oliver Campbell defeated (United States) Henry Slocum 6–2, 4–6, 6–3, 6–1

=== Women's singles ===
(United States) Ellen Roosevelt defeated (United States) Bertha Townsend 6–2, 6–2

=== Men's doubles ===
(United States) Valentine Hall / (United States) Clarence Hobart defeated (United States) Charles Carver / (United States) John Ryerson 6–3, 4–6, 6–2, 2–6, 6–3

=== Women's doubles ===
(United States) Grace Roosevelt / (United States) Ellen Roosevelt defeated (United States) Bertha Townsend / (United States) Margarette Ballard 6–1, 6–2

Preceded by 1890 Wimbledon Championships	Grand Slams	Succeeded by 1891 Wimbledon Championships
