= 1888 U.S. National Championships – Women's singles =

Women's singles
- 1888 U.S. National Championships

Final
- Champion: (United States) Bertha Townsend
- Runner-up: (United States) Ellen Hansell
- Score: 6–3, 6–5

Events
| Singles | men | women |
| Doubles | men | women |
- U.S. National Championships

Bertha Townsend defeated Marion Wright 6–2, 6–2 in the All Comers' Final of the 1888 U.S. Women's National Singles tennis championship. Bertha Townsend defeated reigning champion Ellen Hansell 6–3, 6–5 in the Challenge Round. The event was held at the Philadelphia Cricket Club, Pennsylvania.

== Draw ==
=== Challenge round ===
| Challenge Round |
| (United States) Bertha Townsend | 6 | 6 |
| (United States) Ellen Hansell | 3 | 5 |

=== All Comers' finals ===
First round
(United States) Bertha Townsend | 6 | 6
(United States) Helen Day Harris | 4 | 0
(United States) Adeline Robinson | 6 | 6
(United States) Augusta Roberts | 3 | 4
(United States) Ellie Roosevelt | 6 | 6
(United States) Sybil Johnson | 3 | 0
(United States) Marion Wright | 6 | 6
(United States) Grace Roosevelt | 2 | 3

Quarterfinals
(United States) Bertha Townsend
bye
(United States) Adeline Robinson | 6 | 3 | 6
(United States) Ellen Roosevelt | 4 | 6 | 3
(United States) Violet Ward | 0 | 5
(United States) Marion Wright | 6 | 6

Semi-finals
(United States) Bertha Townsend | 1 | 6 | 6
(United States) Adeline Robinson | 6 | 5 | 3
bye
(United States) Marion Wright

Final
(United States) Bertha Townsend | 6 | 6
(United States) Marion Wright | 2 | 2

| Preceded by 1888 Wimbledon Championships – Women's singles | Grand Slam women's singles | Succeeded by 1889 Wimbledon Championships – Women's singles |
