= 1890 U.S. National Championships – Women's singles =

Women's singles
- 1890 U.S. National Championships

Final
- Champion: (United States) Ellen Roosevelt
- Runner-up: (United States) Bertha Townsend
- Score: 6–2, 6–2

Details
- Draw: 8(+CR)
- Seeds: –

Events
Singles	men	women
Doubles	men	women
- U.S. National Championships

Ellen Roosevelt won the singles tennis title by defeating reigning champion Bertha Townsend 6–2, 6–2 in the Challenge Round of the 1890 U.S. Women's National Singles Championship in front of a crowd of nearly 2,000 people. Roosevelt had won the right to challenge Townsend by defeating Lida Voorhees 6–3, 6–1 in the final of the All Comers' competition. The event was played on outdoor grass courts and held at the Philadelphia Cricket Club in Chestnut Hill, Philadelphia from June 10 through June 13, 1890.

== Draw ==
=== Challenge round ===
Challenge Round
(United States) Bertha Townsend	2	2
(United States) Ellen Roosevelt	6	6

=== All Comers' finals ===
Quarterfinals
(United States) Ellen Roosevelt	6	6
(United States) D.F. Butterfield	0	0
(United Kingdom) Mabel Cahill	6	6
(United States) Rebecca H. Lycett	1	1
(United States) Lida Voorhees	6	3	6
(United States) F.K. Gregory	1	6	1
(United States) Margarette Ballard	6	6
(United States) S. Day	2	1

Semifinals
(United States) Ellen Roosevelt	2	6	3
(United Kingdom) Mabel Cahill	6	5	2r
(United States) Lida Voorhees	6	3	6
(United States) Margarette Ballard	4	6	5

Finals
(United States) Ellen Roosevelt	6	6
(United States) Lida Voorhees	3	1

Preceded by 1890 Wimbledon Championships – Women's singles	Grand Slam women's singles	Succeeded by 1891 Wimbledon Championships – Women's singles
