= 1889 U.S. National Championships – Men's doubles =

Men's doubles
- 1889 U.S. National Championships

Final
- Champion: (United States) Henry Slocum (United States) Howard Taylor
- Runner-up: (United States) Valentine G. Hall (United States) Oliver Campbell
- Score: 6–1, 6–3, 6–2

Events
Singles	men	women
Doubles	men	women
← 1888 ·	U.S. National Championships	· 1890 →

Henry Slocum and Howard Taylor won the title by defeating Valentine Hall and Oliver Campbell in the final.

== Draw ==
First round
FV Beach (United States) B Huntington	6	6	6
(United States) A Empie Wright (United States) D Miller	4	3	4
(United States) H Slocum (United States) H Taylor	8	6	6
(United States) C Hobart (United States) AWS Post	6	4	2
(United States) JA Rome (United States) P Willis	6	4	8	6
(United States) SW Smith (United States) BS de Garmendia	1	6	6	1
(United States) VG Hall (United States) O Campbell	6	6	6
FD Pavey (United States) WA Tomes	3	3	1

Semifinals
FV Beach (United States) B Huntington	3	3	1
(United States) H Slocum (United States) H Taylor	6	6	6
(United States) JA Rome (United States) P Willis	7	6	1	3
(United States) VG Hall (United States) O Campbell	9	3	6	6

Final
(United States) H Slocum (United States) H Taylor	6	6	6
(United States) VG Hall (United States) O Campbell	1	3	2
