= Staten Island Ladies Club Open =

Staten Island Ladies' Club Open

Defunct tennis tournament
- Founded: 1878; 148 years ago
- Abolished: 1908; 118 years ago
- Location: Staten Island, New York City, United States
- Venue: Staten Island Cricket and Baseball Club
- Surface: Grass

The Staten Island Ladies' Club Open was a tennis competition founded in 1878 as the Staten Island Cricket and Baseball Club Tournament. In 1883, the event was known as the Camp Washington Ladies Lawn Tennis Tournament. In 1885, it was branded as the Ladies Club for Outdoor Sports Open The tournament was discontinued in 1908.

== History ==
In 1878, as the Staten Island Cricket and Baseball Club tournament was organised for the first time by the Staten Island Cricket and Baseball Club and played at Camp Washington, New Brighton, Staten Island New York City, United States.

That event was staged one time and featured a doubles competition only won by Mary Outerbridge and L. Outerbridge who defeated Adeline Robinson and a Miss West. In 1880, the first ladies open tournament was held. The organisers of these events were the Ladies Club of Staten Island and Outdoor Sports composed entirely of women contained some of the best women players in the United States. In October 1883, the Ladies Club for Outdoor Sports (part of the Staten Island Cricket Club) revived the event as the Camp Washington Ladies Lawn Tennis Tournament.

By 1885, the tournament was known as the Ladies Club for Outdoor Sports Open. By the 1890s, the event was known as Staten Island Ladies' Club Open that was held annually until 1908 when it was discontinued.) In 1886, the Staten Island Cricket and Baseball Club organized a men only event usually held in July annually called the Staten Island Invitation, that event ended in 1922. The event was usually held in late September or early October.

== Location ==
The tournament was initially held in New Brighton, then moved to Tompkinsville it was also held in Livingston, Staten Island.

== Finals ==
=== Women's singles ===
(Incomplete roll)

Year	Winners	Runners-up	Score
1878	(United States) Mary Outerbridge	(United States) Laura Outerbridge	13–11, 5–0
1883	(United States) Miss Goodwin	(United States) Adeline Robinson	6–2, 4–6, 6–5.
1885	(United States) Miss Lesley	(United States) Miss Austin	4–6, 6–2, 6–3.
1887	(United States) Adeline Robinson	(United States) Mrs A Harris	6–0, 6–1.
1888	(United States) Adeline Robinson	(United States) Miss Lesley	4–6, 6–2, 6–3.
1892	(United States) Ellen Roosevelt	(United States) Annie Burdette	6–4, 5–7, 7–5, 6–3

=== Women's doubles ===
(Incomplete roll)

Year	Winners	Runners-up	Score
1878	(United States) Mary Outerbridge (United States) Laura Outerbridge	(United States) Adeline Robinson (United States) Miss West	13–11, 5–1
1885	(United States) Annie Lesley (United States) Annie Miller	(United States) Miss Etting (United States) Kitty Smith	6–3, 7–5
1887	(United States) Adeline Robinson (United States) Kitty Smith	(United States) Mary Fellowes-Morgan (United States) Miss Ward	6–2, 6–2
1888	(United States) Ellen Roosevelt (United States) Grace Roosevelt	(United States) Adeline Robinson (United States) G. Williams	6–2, 6–0
1892	(United States) Ellen Roosevelt (United States) Grace Roosevelt	(United States) Annie Burdette (United States) Sallie Homans	2–6, 6–3, 6–2, 7–5

=== Mix doubles ===
(Incomplete roll)

Year	Winners	Runners-up	Score
1885	(United States) Kitty Smith (United States) Robert L. Beeckman	(United States) Annie Miller (United States) Henry Slocum	?
1888	(United States) Adeline Robinson (United States) Henry Slocum	(United States) Mary Fellowes-Morgan (United States) H. Waldo	6–0, 6–2.
1888	(United States) Adeline Robinson (United States) Henry Slocum	(United States) G. Williams (United States) Oliver Samuel Campbell	3–6, 6–4, 4–1 ret.
1892	(Ireland) Mabel Cahill (United States) Carroll J. Post	(United States) Adelaide Badgley (Ireland) Manliffe Goodbody	3–6, 6–2, 6–4
