= 1888 U.S. National Championships – Men's doubles =

Men's doubles
- 1888 U.S. National Championships

Final
- Champion: (United States) Valentine G. Hall (United States) Oliver Campbell
- Runner-up: (United States) Edward P. MacMullen (United States) Clarence Hobart
- Score: 6–4, 6–2, 6–4

Events
Singles	men	women
Doubles	men	women
← 1887 ·	U.S. National Championships	· 1889 →

Valentine Hall and Oliver Campbell won their first doubles title at the U.S. championships.

== Draw ==
First round
(United States) VG Hall (United States) O Campbell	6	6	6
(United States) CJ Post (United States) WA Tomes	2	1	1
(United States) H Taylor (United States) J Clark	6	6	6
(United States) A Torrance (United States) MH Torrance	4	3	3
(United States) BF Cummins (United States) EW McCellan	6	4	6	7	6
FV Beach (United States) CH Ludington	3	6	4	9	4
(United States) EP MacMullen (United States) C Hobart	6	3	4	7	6
(United States) H Slocum (United States) Keene	4	6	6	5	3

Semifinals
(United States) VG Hall (United States) O Campbell	6	3	7	6
(United States) H Taylor (United States) J Clark	3	6	5	3
(United States) BF Cummins (United States) EW McCellan	2	7	4	3
(United States) EP MacMullen (United States) C Hobart	6	5	6	6

Final
(United States) VG Hall (United States) O Campbell	6	6	6
(United States) EP MacMullen (United States) C Hobart	4	2	4
