= Adeline Robinson =

American tennis player

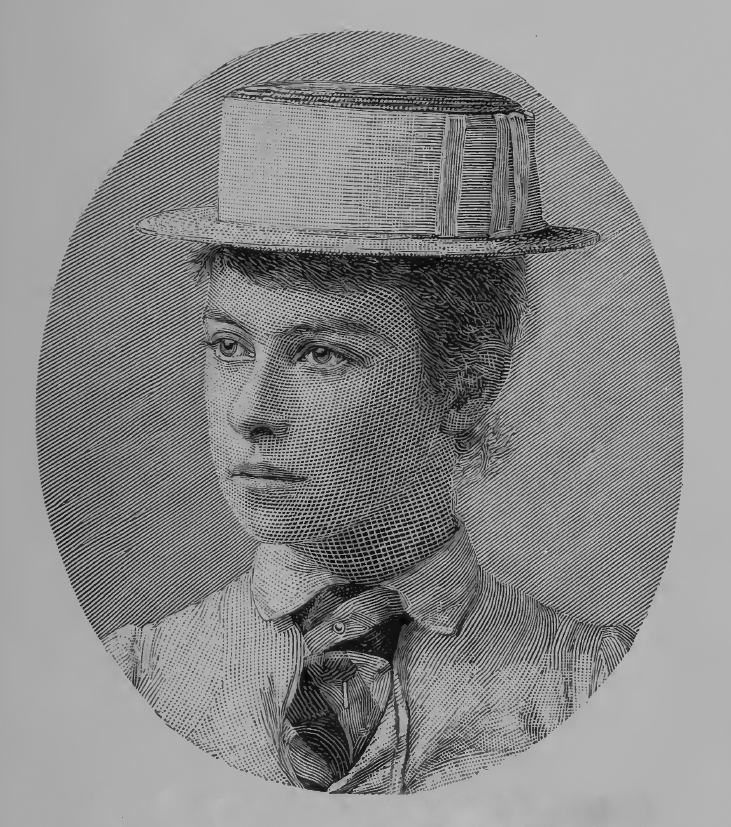
- Full name: Adeline King Robinson
- Country (sports): United States
- Born: March 22, 1865 New York, USA
- Died: February 5, 1943 (aged 77) New York, USA

Singles
- Career titles: 8

Grand Slam singles results
- US Open: SF (1888)

Grand Slam mixed doubles results
- US Open: F (1888) not official

Adeline King Robinson (March 22, 1865 – December 18, 1943) was an American female tennis player. She was active from 1883 to 1890 and contested 9 career singles finals, and won 8 titles.

She was born on Staten Island in New York, the daughter of stockbroker Beverly Robinson and Eliza Gracie King. She was educated at private schools in New York City and in France.

Robinson mainly played at the Staten Island Cricket and Baseball Club and in New York tournaments. In 1885, she won the Ladies Club for Outdoor Sports Open and again in 1885. In September 1887, she won the doubles event at the New York Tennis Club Open tournament with Miss Clark. In October, she won the singles title at the Hastings-on-Hudson tournament after defeating Ellen Roosevelt in the final.

Robinson competed in the women's singles event at the 1888 National Championships, played in June at the Philadelphia Cricket Club. She defeated Augusta Roberts in the first round in straight sets and won her second round match against Ellen Roosevelt before losing in the semifinal to eventual champion Bertha Townsend after failing to convert a matchpoint. She was described by tennis champion Henry Slocum in 1889 as "the most skillful exponent of lawn tennis to be found among the women of America." (Note: In an article in the July 1889 issue of Outing he mentions "Apart from being a remarkably well-conducted institution, the ladies’ club is famous and fortunate in numbering among its members Miss Adeline Robinson, who, according to popular opinion, is the most skillful exponent of lawn tennis to be found among the women of America.")

After rheumatism cut short her tennis career, Robinson took up golf and played for the Richmond County Country Club. She was the defending champion at the 1898 Harbor Hill Golf Club tournament and competed at the W.M.G.A. tournament in 1900.

In the late 1890s, she began giving dancing lessons to children which she continued to do until about 1939.
