= 1888 U.S. National Championships – Men's singles =

Men's singles
- 1888 U.S. National Championships

Final
- Champion: (United States) Henry Slocum
- Runner-up: (United States) Richard Sears
- Score: w/o

Events
Singles	men	women
Doubles	men	women
← 1887 ·	U.S. National Championships	· 1889 →

Henry Slocum defeated Howard Taylor in the all comers' final, 6–4, 6–1, 6–0, to win the men's singles tennis title at the 1888 U.S. National Championships. Slocum won the Challenge Round automatically, as the seven-time defending champion Richard Sears had retired earlier that year. The event was held at the Newport Casino, R.I.

== Draw ==
=== Challenge round ===
Challenge Round
(United States) Richard Sears
(United States) Henry Slocum	w/o

=== All Comers' finals ===
Semifinals
(United States) Henry Slocum	6	6	6
(United States) Oliver Campbell	2	3	4
(United States) Philip Sears	7	4	2	2
(United States) Howard Taylor	5	6	6	6

Finals
(United States) Henry Slocum	6	6	6
(United States) Howard Taylor	4	1	0

=== Earlier rounds ===
==== Section 1 ====
First round
(United States) H Slocum	6	6	6
(United States) WH Barnes	2	0	0
(United States) J Clark	6	3	6	6
(United States) FLV Hoppin	3	6	1	2
(United States) J Dwight	6	6	6
(United States) FW Taylor	0	1	2
(United States) E Tuttle	w/o
(United States) CF Stickney
(United States) CP Wilbur	6	6	9
(United States) C Beatty	3	3	7
(United States) O Campbell	7	6	6
(United Kingdom) WD Waller	5	3	2
(United States) M Fielding	6	6	6
(United States) F Warren	1	2	3
(United States) A Empie Wright	6	6	6
(United Kingdom) J Brown	2	3	3

Second round
(United States) H Slocum	6	6	6
(United States) J Clark	2	3	2
(United States) J Dwight	6	6	6
(United States) E Tuttle	1	0	1
(United States) CP Wilbur	2	1	3
(United States) O Campbell	6	6	6
(United States) M Fielding	6	2	1	1
(United States) A Empie Wright	2	6	6	6

Quarterfinals
(United States) H Slocum	4	6	6	6
(United States) J Dwight	6	3	0	2
(United States) O Campbell	4	6	1	8	6
(United States) A Empie Wright	6	3	6	6	2

Semifinals
(United States) H Slocum	6	6	6
(United States) O Campbell	2	3	4

==== Section 2 ====
First round
(United States) GW Lee	6	7	6
(United States) WR Weeden	4	5	2
(United States) PS Sears	6	6	6
(United States) WL Jennings	2	3	2
(United States) J Ryerson	8	6	3	6
(United States) A Hubbard	6	3	6	0
(United States) B Lamb	6	6	6
(United States) A Rives	1	2	1
(United States) H Taylor	w/o
(United States) FA Kellogg
(United States) RB Hale	w/o
(United States) GM Brinley
(United States) P Presbry	19	8	6	3	6
(United States) TS Tailer	21	6	1	6	4
(United States) AL Williston	6	6	7	3	6
(United States) VG Hall	4	8	5	6	2

Second round
(United States) GW Lee	6	0	4
(United States) PS Sears	8	6	6
(United States) J Ryerson	6	6	3	11
(United States) B Lamb	2	0	6	9
(United States) H Taylor	6	6	6
(United States) RB Hale	1	1	1
(United States) P Presbry	6	4	4	4
(United States) AL Williston	2	6	6	6

Quarterfinals
(United States) PS Sears	8	6	6
(United States) J Ryerson	6	0	4
(United States) H Taylor	6	6	7
(United States) AL Williston	2	3	5

Semifinals
(United States) PS Sears	7	4	2	2
(United States) H Taylor	5	6	6	6

Preceded by 1887 Wimbledon Championships – Men's Singles	Grand Slam men's singles	Succeeded by 1888 Wimbledon Championships – Men's singles
