= 1890 U.S. National Championships – Men's singles =

Men's singles
- 1890 U.S. National Championships

Final
- Champion: (United States) Oliver Campbell
- Runner-up: (United States) Henry Slocum
- Score: 6–2, 4–6, 6–3, 6–1

Events
Singles	men	women
Doubles	men	women
← 1889 ·	U.S. National Championships	· 1891 →

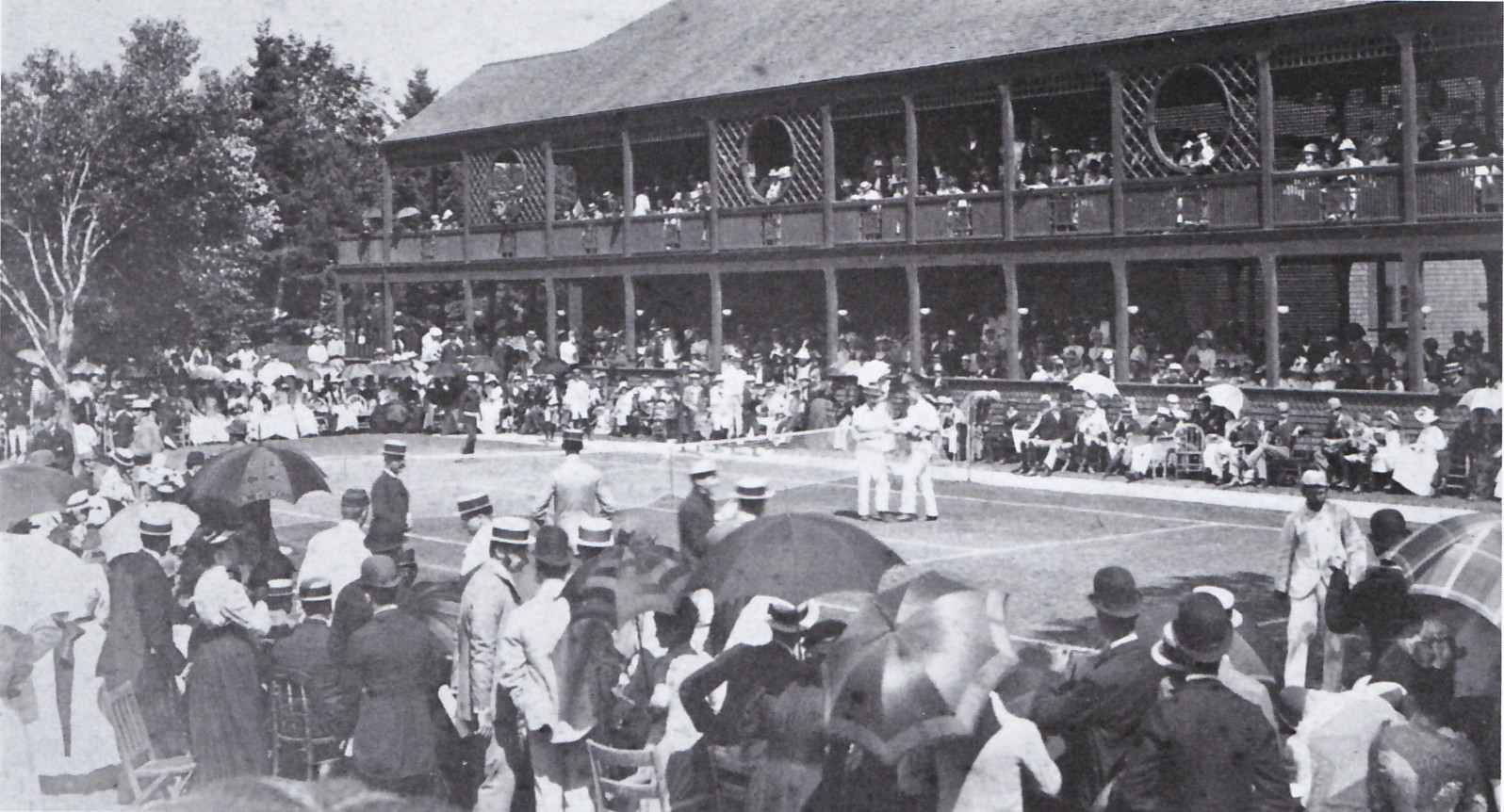
Semifinal at the 1890 U.S. Tennis Championships at Newport. Match between Oliver Campbell and Bob Huntington

Oliver Campbell defeated the two-time defending champion Henry Slocum in the challenge round, 6–2, 4–6, 6–3, 6–1 to win the men's singles tennis title at the 1890 U.S. National Championships. It was the first of three U.S. Championships titles for Campbell.

== Draw ==
=== Challenge round ===
Challenge round
(United States) H Slocum	2	6	3	1
(United States) O Campbell	6	4	6	6

=== Finals ===
Semifinals
(United States) C Hobart	8	5	2
(United States) P Knapp	10	7	6
(United States) O Campbell	3	6	5	6	6
(United States) B Huntington	6	2	7	2	1

Finals
(United States) P Knapp	6	6	2	3
(United States) O Campbell	8	0	6	6

=== Earlier rounds ===
==== Section 1 ====
First round
(United States) H Tallant	6	6	6
(United States) LJ Grant	1	0	0
(United Kingdom) MR Wright	6	6	6
(United States) C Bentley	1	1	3

Second round
(United States) C Hobart	6	6	6
(United States) GF Brown	1	3	1
(United States) M Chace	6	6	6	6	6
(United States) D Miller	1	8	3	3	4
(United States) VG Hall	6	6	6
(United States) EW Gould	1	1	3
(United States) H Tallant	6	6	6
(United Kingdom) MR Wright	2	4	1

Third round
(United States) C Hobart	6	6	6
(United States) M Chace	3	2	4
(United States) VG Hall	6	6	6
(United States) H Tallant	2	3	3

Quarterfinals
(United States) C Hobart	6	6	5	3	6
(United States) VG Hall	4	3	7	6	3

==== Section 2 ====
First round
(United States) J Clark	6	6	6
(United States) FW Smith	2	4	0
(United States) HM Billings	2	6	6	6
(United Kingdom) SG Walker	6	3	4	1
(United States) CA Chase	6	6	6
(United States) WK Fowler	2	4	2
(United States) GP Herrick	2	6	6	6
(United States) A Rives	6	3	3	3
(United States) TP Borden	6	8	6
(United States) D Kimball	4	6	2
(United States) M Smith	6	2	7	6
(United States) FLV Hoppin	4	6	6	2
(United States) P Knapp	6	6	6
(United States) FA Kellogg	0	0	0
(United States) P Manchester	8	6	6
(United States) EA Tuttle	6	2	3

Second round
(United States) J Clark	6	7	6
(United States) HM Billings	3	5	3
(United States) CA Chase	6	2	7	6
(United States) GP Herrick	1	6	5	2
(United States) TP Borden	3	0	3
(United States) M Smith	6	6	6
(United States) P Knapp	6	6	6	6
(United States) P Manchester	1	2	8	3

Third round
(United States) J Clark	6	2	4	9
(United States) CA Chase	2	6	6	11
(United States) M Smith	1	3	0
(United States) P Knapp	6	6	6

Quarterfinals
(United States) CA Chase	2	8	3	3
(United States) P Knapp	6	6	6	6

==== Section 3 ====
First round
JW Carver	5	6	6	6
(United States) T Horton	7	0	1	2
(United States) A Empie Wright	6	4	6	6
(United States) BS de Garmendia	4	6	3	1
(United States) O Campbell	6	6	6
(United States) F Huntington	3	4	3
SWB Moorehead	w/	o
HM Wilder
(United States) B Lamb	6	6	6
EA Thompson	4	0	3
(United States) J Ryerson	6	7	6
JHF Hunt	0	5	3
(United States) EL Hall	6	6	6
WB Dinsmore	4	2	4
(United States) Keene	w/	o
(United States) WG Herrick

Second round
JW Carver	6
(United States) A Empie Wright	1	r
(United States) O Campbell	3	7	6	6
SWB Moorehead	6	5	1	3
(United States) B Lamb	6	5	1	3
(United States) J Ryerson	3	7	6	6
(United States) EL Hall	2	6	3	2
(United States) Keene	6	3	6	6

Third round
JW Carver	2	3	6
(United States) O Campbell	6	6	5
(United States) J Ryerson	5	4	6	6	6
(United States) Keene	7	6	3	4	1

Quarterfinals
(United States) O Campbell	6	7	6
(United States) J Ryerson	1	5	3

==== Section 4 ====
First round
(United States) PS Sears	6	6	6
(United States) WF Metcalfe	1	0	0
CP Howland	w/	o
(United States) CE Sands
(United States) F Hovey	w/	o
(United States) AA Chase

Second round
(United States) PS Sears	4	6	6	6
CP Howland	6	4	3	4
(United States) F Hovey	6	4	6	5	0
(United States) B Huntington	3	6	3	7	6
O Englestrom	w/	o
(United States) R Sands
(United States) GW Lee	6	6	6
C Byrnes	2	3	4

Third round
(United States) PS Sears	6	6	2	4	5
(United States) B Huntington	2	3	6	6	7
O Englestrom	4	4	2
(United States) GW Lee	6	6	6

Quarterfinals
(United States) B Huntington	5	6	6	6
(United States) GW Lee	7	1	1	1

== Sources ==
- Albiero, Alessandro; Carta, Andrea (2010). The Grand Slam Record Book Vol. 1. Monte Porzio Catone: Effepi Libri. p. 572. ISBN 978-88-6002-017-8.

Preceded by 1889 Wimbledon Championships – Men's Singles	Grand Slam men's singles	Succeeded by 1890 Wimbledon Championships – Men's singles
