= 1889 U.S. National Championships – Men's singles =

Men's singles
- 1889 U.S. National Championships

Final
- Champion: (United States) Henry Slocum
- Runner-up: (United States) Quincy Shaw
- Score: 6–3, 6–1, 4–6, 6–2

Events
Singles	men	women
Doubles	men	women
← 1888 ·	U.S. National Championships	· 1890 →

Defending champion Henry Slocum defeated Quincy Shaw in the Challenge Round, 6–3, 6–1, 4–6, 6–2 to win the men's singles tennis title at the 1887 U.S. National Championships. Shaw defeated Oliver Campbell in the All Comers' Final, 1–6, 6–4, 6–3, 6–4. The event was held at the Newport Casino, Newport, R.I. from August 21 to August 28.

== Draw ==
=== Challenge round ===
Challenge round
(United States) Henry Slocum	6	6	4	6
(United States) Quincy A Shaw	3	1	6	2

=== Finals ===
Semifinals
(United States) Quincy A Shaw	4	6	6	6
(United States) Percy Knapp	6	1	4	4
(United Kingdom) Ernest Meers	7	1	7	4	2
(United States) Oliver Campbell	5	6	5	6	6

Finals
(United States) Quincy A Shaw	1	6	6	6
(United States) Oliver Campbell	6	4	3	4

=== Earlier rounds ===
==== Section 1 ====
First round
(United States) CA Chase	6	6	6
(United States) FOS Reade	0	3	1
(United States) RB Hale	6	6	6
(United States) A Rives	2	2	1
(United States) RV Beach	6	6	8
(United States) FW Taylor	2	2	6
(United States) QA Shaw	7	7	6	6
(United States) A Empie Wright	9	5	3	4
(United States) J Ryerson	6	5	6	7
(United States) AL Williston	0	7	0	5
(United States) P Knapp	6	8	4	6
(United States) M Fielding	2	6	6	2
(United States) D Miller	6	8	6
(United States) RC Sands	4	6	1
(United States) GR Fearing	6	6	6
(United States) WW Reece	3	2	4

Second round
(United States) CA Chase	6	6	6
(United States) RB Hale	4	0	3
(United States) RV Beach	9	4	0	2
(United States) QA Shaw	7	6	6	6
(United States) J Ryerson	5	6	2
(United States) P Knapp	7	8	6
(United States) D Miller	6	6	6
(United States) GR Fearing	2	2	3

Quarterfinals
(United States) CA Chase	4	4	6	3
(United States) QA Shaw	6	6	4	6
(United States) P Knapp	6	6	6
(United States) D Miller	4	3	2

Semifinals
(United States) QA Shaw	4	6	6	6
(United States) P Knapp	6	1	4	4

==== Section 2 ====
First round
(United States) FLV Hoppin	6	6	6
(United States) SC Fox	3	0	1
(United States) FS Mansfield	9	6	6
(United States) TS Tailer	7	0	1
(United States) MR Wright	6	6	6
(United States) EW Gould	3	0	2
(United Kingdom) E Meers	6	6	6
(United States) CE Sands	4	3	4
(United States) ST Chase	8	6	2	6
(United States) GA Hurd	6	4	6	4
(United States) J Clark	6	7	6
(United States) WR Weeden	3	5	4
(United States) H Taylor	6	6	6
(United States) R Huntington	3	3	0
(United States) O Campbell	6	6	6
(United Kingdom) EV Thompson	4	1	2

Second round
(United States) FLV Hoppin	5	0	1
(United States) FS Mansfield	7	6	6
(United States) MR Wright	5	3	4
(United Kingdom) E Meers	7	6	6
(United States) ST Chase	6	1	6	4	5
(United States) J Clark	2	6	0	6	7
(United States) H Taylor	4	2	5
(United States) O Campbell	6	6	7

Quarterfinals
(United States) FS Mansfield	1	2	2
(United Kingdom) E Meers	6	6	6
(United States) J Clark	12	5	3	3
(United States) O Campbell	10	7	6	6

Semifinals
(United Kingdom) E Meers	7	1	7	4	2
(United States) O Campbell	5	6	5	6	6

Preceded by 1888 Wimbledon Championships – Men's Singles	Grand Slam men's singles	Succeeded by 1889 Wimbledon Championships – Men's singles
