= 1889 U.S. National Championships (tennis) =

- Date: August 27 – September 3 (M); June 11 – June 15 (W)
- Edition: 9th
- Category: Grand Slam
- Surface: Grass
- Location: Philadelphia, PA (WS, WD); Livingston, Staten Island, NY (MD); Newport, R.I. (MS)

Champions

Men's singles
- (United States) Henry Slocum

Women's singles
- (United States) Bertha Townsend

Men's doubles
- (United States) Henry Slocum / (United States) Howard Taylor

Women's doubles
- (United States) Margarette Ballard / (United States) Bertha Townsend
- U.S. National Championships

The 1889 U.S. National Championships (now known as the US Open) was a tennis tournament that took place in June, August, and September of 1889.

The women's tournament was held from June 11 to June 15 on the outdoor grass courts at the Philadelphia Cricket Club in Philadelphia, Pennsylvania. The men's tournament was held from August 27 to September 3 on the outdoor grass courts at the Newport Casino in Newport, Rhode Island. The men's doubles event was played at the Staten Island Cricket Club in Livingston, Staten Island, New York. It was the 9th U.S. National Championships and the second Grand Slam tournament of the year.

This was the first edition of a doubles championship for women, with the event being held at the Philadelphia Cricket Club: Margarette Ballard and Bertha Townsend were the first women's doubles champions.

== Finals ==
=== Men's singles ===
(United States) Henry Slocum defeated (United States) Quincy Shaw 6–3, 6–1, 4–6, 6–2

=== Women's singles ===
(United States) Bertha Townsend defeated (United States) Lida Voorhees 7–5, 6–2

=== Men's doubles ===
(United States) Henry Slocum / (United States) Howard Taylor defeated (United States) Valentine Hall / (United States) Oliver Campbell 6–1, 6–3, 6–2

=== Women's doubles ===
(United States) Margarette Ballard / (United States) Bertha Townsend defeated (United States) Marion Wright / (United States) Laura Knight 6–0, 6–2

Preceded by 1889 Wimbledon Championships	Grand Slams	Succeeded by 1890 Wimbledon Championships
