= 1889 Wimbledon Championships =

- Date: 1 – 13 July
- Edition: 13th
- Category: Grand Slam
- Surface: Grass
- Location: Worple Road; SW19, Wimbledon, London, United Kingdom
- Venue: All England Lawn Tennis Club

Champions

Men's singles
- (United Kingdom) William Renshaw

Women's singles
- (United Kingdom) Blanche Hillyard

Men's doubles
- (United Kingdom) Ernest Renshaw / (United Kingdom) William Renshaw
- Wimbledon Championships

The 1889 Wimbledon Championships took place on the outdoor grass courts at the All England Lawn Tennis Club in Wimbledon, London, United Kingdom. The tournament ran from 1 July until 13 July. It was the 13th staging of the Wimbledon Championships, and the first Grand Slam tennis event of 1889. William Renshaw won his seventh singles title, which as late as 1977 was thought to be a feat unlikely to ever be surpassed. However, in 2000 Pete Sampras equaled this total, and in 2012 Roger Federer also won a seventh title. Ultimately the record was broken by Federer in 2017 when he became the first man to win eight singles titles at Wimbledon. The Renshaw brothers were also unbeaten in doubles for seven years. The men's doubles were played after completion of the singles competitions.

== Finals ==
=== Men's singles ===
(United Kingdom) William Renshaw defeated (United Kingdom) Ernest Renshaw, 6–4, 6–1, 3–6, 6–0

=== Women's singles ===
(United Kingdom) Blanche Hillyard defeated (United Kingdom) Lena Rice, 4–6, 8–6, 6–4

=== Men's doubles ===
(United Kingdom) Ernest Renshaw / (United Kingdom) William Renshaw defeated (United Kingdom) George Hillyard / (United Kingdom) Ernest Lewis 6–4, 6–4, 3–6, 0–6, 6–1

Preceded by 1888 Wimbledon Championships	Wimbledon Championships	Succeeded by 1890 Wimbledon Championships
Preceded by 1888 U.S. National Championships	Grand Slams	Succeeded by 1889 U.S. National Championships
