= 1889 U.S. National Championships – Women's singles =

Women's singles
- 1889 U.S. National Championships

Final
- Champion: (United States) Bertha Townsend
- Runner-up: (United States) Lida Voorhees
- Score: 7–5, 6–2

Details
- Draw: 8 + 1
- Seeds: –

Events
Singles	men	women
Doubles	men	women
- U.S. National Championships

Bertha Townsend defended her tennis singles title by defeating Lida Voorhees 7–5, 6–2 in the Challenge Round of the 1889 U.S. Women's National Singles Championship. Voorhuis had won the right to challenge Townsend by defeating Helen Day Harris 6–5, 2–6, 6–3 in the final of the All Comers' competition. The event was held at the Philadelphia Cricket Club, Pennsylvania.

== Draw ==
=== Challenge round ===
Challenge Round
(United States) Bertha Townsend	7	6
(United States) Lida Voorhees	5	2

=== All Comers' finals ===
Quarterfinals
(United States) Lida Voorhees	6	6
(United States) Laura Knight	1	2
(United States) Grace Roosevelt
(United States) Marion Wright
(United States) D.F. Butterfield	6	6
(United States) Anna C. Smith	3	1
(United States) Rebecca H. Lycett	1	1
(United States) Helen Day Harris	6	6

Semifinals
(United States) Lida Voorhees	6	4	6
(United States) Grace Roosevelt	1	6	5
(United States) D.F. Butterfield	1	3
(United States) Helen Day Harris	6	6

Finals
(United States) Lida Voorhees	6	2	6
(United States) Helen Day Harris	5	6	3

Preceded by 1889 Wimbledon Championships – Women's singles	Grand Slam women's singles	Succeeded by 1890 Wimbledon Championships – Women's singles
