= 1888 U.S. National Championships (tennis) =

- Date: August 21–28 (M); June 12–15 (W)
- Edition: 8th
- Category: Grand Slam
- Surface: Grass
- Location: Philadelphia, PA (WS); Livingston, Staten Island, NY (MD); Newport, R.I. (MS)

Champions

Men's singles
- (United States) Henry Slocum

Women's singles
- (United States) Bertha Townsend

Men's doubles
- (United States) Oliver Campbell / (United States) Valentine Hall
- U.S. National Championships

The 1888 U.S. National Championships (now known as the US Open) was a tennis tournament that took place in June and August of 1888.

The women's tournament was held from June 12 to June 15 on the outdoor grass courts at the Philadelphia Cricket Club in Philadelphia, Pennsylvania. The men's tournament was held from August 22 to August 30 on the outdoor grass courts at the Newport Casino in Newport, Rhode Island. The men's doubles event was played at the Staten Island Cricket Club in Livingston, Staten Island, New York. It was the 8th U.S. National Championships and the second Grand Slam tournament of the year.:

== Champions ==
=== Men's singles ===
(United States) Henry Slocum defeated (United States) Howard Taylor 6–4, 6–1, 6–0

=== Women's singles ===
(United States) Bertha Townsend defeated (United States) Ellen Hansell 6–3, 6–5

=== Men's doubles ===
(United States) Oliver Campbell / (United States) Valentine Hall defeated (United States) Clarence Hobart / (United States) Edward MacMullen 6–4, 6–2, 6–2

Preceded by 1888 Wimbledon Championships	Grand Slams	Succeeded by 1889 Wimbledon Championships
