= 1887 U.S. National Championships – Women's singles =

Women's singles
- 1887 U.S. National Championships

Final
- Champion: (United States) Ellen Hansell
- Runner-up: (United States) Laura Knight
- Score: 6–1, 6–0

Details
- Draw: 7
- Seeds: –

Events
Singles	men	women
Doubles	men	women
- U.S. National Championships

Ellen Hansell defeated Laura Knight 6–1, 6–0 in the final to win the inaugural event of the women's singles tennis title at the 1887 U.S. National Championships. It was played on outdoor grass courts and held from September 27 through October 5, 1887 at the Philadelphia Cricket Club in Wissahickon, Philadelphia.

== Draw ==
First round
(United States) Ellen Hansell	6	6
(United States) Jessie Harding	1	0
(United States) Helen Day Harris	6	6
(United States) Louise Alderdice	3	5
(United States) Alice Janney
bye
(United States) Ruth Cott	0	3
(United States) Laura Knight	6	6

Semifinals
(United States) Ellen Hansell	2	6	6
(United States) Helen Day Harris	6	4	4
(United States) Alice Janney	5	1
(United States) Laura Knight	7	6

Finals
(United States) Ellen Hansell	6	6
(United States) Laura Knight	1	0

Preceded by 1887 Wimbledon Championships – Women's singles	Grand Slam women's singles	Succeeded by 1888 Wimbledon Championships – Women's singles
