= 1889 Grand National =

English steeplechase horse race

- Grand National
- Location: Aintree
- Date: 29 March 1889
- Winning horse: Frigate IRE
- Starting price: 8/1
- Jockey: Mr Tommy Beasley IRE
- Trainer: M A Maher IRE
- Owner: Mat Maher IRE
- Conditions: Good

The 1889 Grand National was the 51st renewal of the Grand National horse race that took place at Aintree near Liverpool, England, on 29 March 1889.

== Finishing Order ==
Position	Name	Jockey	Handicap (st-lb)	SP	Distance
01	Frigate	Tommy Beasley	11-4	8/1	1 Length
02	Why Not	Charles Cunningham	11-5	100/9	A distance
03	M.P.	Arthur Nightingall	10-9	20/1	
04	Bellona	Chris Waller	11-2	20/1	
05	Magic	John Jones	10-9	25/1	
06	The Sikh	Dan Thirwell	10-9	100/9	
07	The Fawn	William Beasley	10-10	25/1	
08	Ringlet	John Walsh	11-12	66/1	
09	Battle Royal	Harry Beasley Snr	10-8	25/1	
10	Gamecock	Bill Dollery	11-12	33/1	Last to complete

== Non-finishers ==
Fence	Name	Jockey	Handicap (st-lb)	SP	Fate
03	Ballot Box	William Nightingall	12-7	20/1	Ballot Box
26	Roquefort	Ted Wilson	12-0	6/1	Fell
02	Savoyard	George Lambton	11-11	25/1	Knocked Over
20	Voluptuary	Tom Skelton	11-3	100/6	Fell
06	Kilworth	Roddy Owen	10-13	40/1	Refused
03	Et Cetera	George Morris	10-13	8/1	Fell
31 (Run-in)	Glenthorpe	William Moore	10-10	10/1	Pulled Up
02	Merry Maiden	John Lee-Barber	10-7	66/1	Refused
03	Hettie	Arthur Hall	10-5	66/1	Fell
?	Great Paul	W. Ellis	10-0	200/1	?
