= Andrew Ziffo =

British tennis player

- Full name: Andrew George Ziffo
- Country (sports): GBR
- Born: 11 August 1868; Kensington, London, England
- Died: 28 May 1955 (age 87); Paddington, London, England
- Turned pro: 1885 (amateur tour)
- Retired: 1891

Singles
- Career record: 44–10
- Career titles: 3

Grand Slam singles results
- Wimbledon: QF (1889)

Doubles

Grand Slam doubles results
- Wimbledon: F (1888)

Andrew George Ziffo (11 August 1868 – 28 May 1955) also known as A.G. Ziffo, was a British tennis player who competed at the Wimbledon Championships four times between 1887 and 1890. He was a quarter finalist in men's singles in 1889, and was a finalist in the men's doubles partnering Ernest George Meers in 1888. He was active from 1885 to 1891 and won 3 career singles titles.

== Career ==
Ziffo was born Kensington, London, England on 11 August 1868. He played his first tournament at the South of England Championships in Eastbourne in 1885. In April 1887, he competed at the British Covered Court Championships at Hyde Park, London where he reached the all-comers final, but was beaten by Ernest Wool Lewis.

In July that year, he took part in the Middlesex Championships where he reached the quarter finals before losing to Harry Sibthorpe Barlow. The same month he played at the Wimbledon Championships for the first time where he entered the gentleman's doubles event partnered with William Taylor and reached the quarter finals losing to E Barratt-Smith and James Crispe.

In July 1888, Ziffo took part in the Wimbledon Championships he exited early in the men's singles in round two. However, in the men's doubles event partnered with Ernest George Meers they reached final, but lost in three sets to Ernest and William Renshaw. In September 1888, he won his first singles title at the South of England Championships against Harry S. Barlow.

In 1889, at the Wimbledon Championships, he reached the quarter finals in the singles event, but lost to Herbert Lawford in straight sets. He later retained the South of England Championships for the second time against Harry Grove. In 1890, he won his final and third consecutive South of England Championships title against James Baldwin in four sets. He played his last singles tournament at the South of England Meeting where he was aiming for a fourth consecutive title, however he was defeated in the final Harry Sibthorpe Barlow in three sets. Ziffo died in Paddington London England on 28 May 1955 age 87.
