= 1889 Wimbledon Championships – Men's singles =

Men's singles
- 1889 Wimbledon Championships

Final
- Champion: (United Kingdom) William Renshaw
- Runner-up: (United Kingdom) Ernest Renshaw
- Score: 6–4, 6–1, 3–6, 6–0

Details
- Draw: 24
- Seeds: –

Events
Singles	men	women
Doubles	men	women
← 1888 ·	Wimbledon Championships	· 1890 →

William Renshaw defeated Harry S. Barlow 3–6, 5–7, 8–6, 10–8, 8–6 in the All Comers' Final, and then defeated his brother and reigning champion Ernest Renshaw 6–4, 6–1, 3–6, 6–0 in the challenge round to win the gentlemen's singles tennis title at the 1889 Wimbledon Championships. Renshaw survived a total of six match points in the All Comers Final against Barlow at 2–5 and 6–7 in the fourth set and trailed 0–5 in the final set.

== Draw ==
=== Key ===
- Q = Qualifier
- WC = Wild card
- LL = Lucky loser
- Alt = Alternate
- ITF = ITF entry
- PR = Protected ranking
- SR = Special ranking
- SE = Special exempt
- JE = Junior exempt
- JR = Junior Accelerator Programme entrant
- CO = College Accelerator Programme entrant
- NG = Next Gen Accelerator Program entrant
- w/o = Walkover
- r = Retired
- d = Defaulted

=== Challenge round ===
Challenge Round
(United Kingdom) William Renshaw	6	6	3	6
(United Kingdom) Ernest Renshaw	4	1	6	0

=== All comers' finals ===
Semifinals
(United Kingdom) Willoughby Hamilton	6	3	6	3	3
(United Kingdom) Harry Barlow	3	6	2	6	6
(United Kingdom) William Renshaw	7	5	6	6
(United Kingdom) Herbert Lawford	5	7	3	2

Final
(United Kingdom) Harry Barlow	6	7	6	8	6
(United Kingdom) William Renshaw	3	5	8	10	8

=== Top half ===
First round
(United Kingdom) George Hillyard	6	6	6
(United Kingdom) Lyttleton Winslow	4	3	3
(United Kingdom) FA Bowlby
(United Kingdom) E G Meers	w/o
(United Kingdom) Harry Barlow	6	6	8
(United Kingdom) FA Darbishire	4	1	6
(United Kingdom) FL Rawson	w/o
(United Kingdom) Harry Grove

Second round
(United Kingdom) Ernest Lewis	6	6	6
(United Kingdom) TS Campion	1	1	1
(United Kingdom) Willoughby Hamilton
(United Kingdom) James Baldwin	w/o
(United Kingdom) G Hillyard	6	4	6	13
(United Kingdom) FA Bowlby	3	6	4	11
(United Kingdom) H Barlow	6	6	6	3	9
(United Kingdom) H Grove	8	4	4	6	7

Quarterfinals
(United Kingdom) E Lewis	6	5	3	7	4
(United Kingdom) W Hamilton	4	7	6	5	6
(United Kingdom) G Hillyard	5	2	4
(United Kingdom) H Barlow	7	6	6

Semifinals
(United Kingdom) W Hamilton	6	3	6	3	3
(United Kingdom) H Barlow	3	6	2	6	6

=== Bottom half ===
First round
(United Kingdom) Arthur Gore	0	3	1
(United Kingdom) Herbert Wilberforce	6	6	6
(United Kingdom) William Renshaw	6	6	6
(United Kingdom) Edward Avory	2	3	2
(United Kingdom) Manliffe Goodbody	6	4	6	6
(United Kingdom) HS Stone	4	6	3	3
(United Kingdom) William Taylor	6	3	3	6	6
(United Kingdom) A Walker	0	6	6	4	4

Second round
(United Kingdom) H Wilberforce	4	5	0
(United Kingdom) W Renshaw	6	7	6
(United Kingdom) M Goodbody	3	6	9	6
(United Kingdom) W Taylor	6	4	7	2
(United Kingdom) Herbert Lawford	6	6	6
(United Kingdom) AW Andrews	1	3	1
(United Kingdom) WH Cohen	3	1	1
(United Kingdom) Andrew Ziffo	6	6	6

Quarterfinals
(United Kingdom) W Renshaw	7	6	6
(United Kingdom) M Goodbody	5	4	4
(United Kingdom) H Lawford	6	6	6
(United Kingdom) A Ziffo	2	2	0

Semifinals
(United Kingdom) W Renshaw	7	5	6	6
(United Kingdom) H Lawford	5	7	3	2

Preceded by 1888 U.S. National Championships – Men's singles	Grand Slam men's singles	Succeeded by 1890 U.S. National Championships – Men's singles
