= Ellen Hansell =

American tennis player

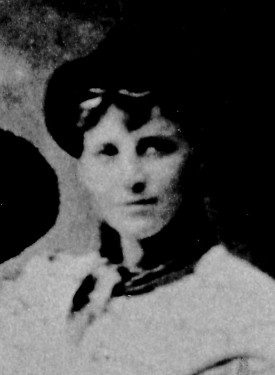
- Full name: Ellen Forde Hansell Allerdice
- Country (sports): (United States) USA
- Born: 18 September 1869 Philadelphia, Pennsylvania
- Died: 11 May 1937 (aged 67) Pittsburgh, Pennsylvania
- Plays: Right-handed
- Int. Tennis HoF: 1965 (member page)

Singles

Grand Slam singles results
- US Open: W (1887)

Ellen Forde Hansell Allerdice (née Hansell; September 18, 1869 – May 11, 1937) was an American female tennis player. She was the first women's singles champion of the U.S. Championships in 1887. She was a losing finalist to Bertha Townsend the next year.

== Early life and tennis ==
Hansell was born on September 18, 1869, in Philadelphia, the daughter of Samuel Rob Hansell, an upholstery manufacturer, and Jane Martin. She battled anemia as a child and started playing tennis on the advice of her doctor. At the age of sixteen, she joined the Belmont Club in Philadelphia, where she played with Margarette Ballard and Bertha Townsend.

== U.S. Women's National Singles Championship ==
In 1887, Hansell took part in the inaugural U.S. Women's National Singles Championship. The event was played on the outdoor grass courts of the Philadelphia Cricket Club and started on 27 September. She was one of seven contestants who came from the greater Delaware Valley area. Hansell, playing in a full, over-draped skirt with long sleeves and her customary red hat, won her opening round against Jessie Harding while losing just one game. In the semifinals, she lost the first set against Helen Day Harris, but won the match in three sets. The final against Laura Knight was a one-sided affair, which Hansell won in straight sets to become the first U.S. women's champion. (Note: The 1887 and 1888 tournaments were retroactively recognized as official U.S. championships in 1889 when the United States National Ladies Tennis Association (USNLTA) was formed.) According to a report she "employed sidearm serves, sliced ground strokes and never, but never went to the net".

The tournament used a challenge system whereby the defending champion automatically qualified for the next year's final in which she would play the winner of the all-comers tournament. This meant that Hansell did not have to play through the 1888 tournament and only had to play the challenge round. She played Bertha Townsend, who had won the all-comer's event against Marion Wright in the final, and Townsend won the match in straight sets.

Hansell did not win another tournament and retired from the game in 1890. She married Taylor Allerdice, and the couple had six children. Hansell was inducted into the International Tennis Hall of Fame in 1965. She died in Pittsburgh Pennsylvania in 1937

== Grand Slam finals ==
=== Singles (1 title, 1 runner-up) ===
Result	Year	Championship	Surface	Opponent	Score
Win	1887	U.S. Championships	Grass	(United States) Laura Knight	6–1, 6–0
Loss	1888	U.S. Championships	Grass	(United States) Bertha Townsend	6–3, 6–5
