= 1889 Wimbledon Championships – Women's singles =

Women's singles
- 1889 Wimbledon Championships

Final
- Champion: (United Kingdom) Blanche Hillyard
- Runner-up: (United Kingdom) Lena Rice
- Score: 4–6, 8–6, 6–4

Details
- Draw: 6
- Seeds: –

Events
Singles	men	women
Doubles	men	women
← 1888 ·	Wimbledon Championships	· 1890 →

Blanche Hillyard defeated Lena Rice 4–6, 8–6, 6–4 in the all comers' final to win the ladies' singles tennis title at the 1889 Wimbledon Championships. The reigning champion Lottie Dod did not defend her title.

== Draw ==
=== Key ===
- Q = Qualifier
- WC = Wild card
- LL = Lucky loser
- Alt = Alternate
- SE = Special exempt
- PR = Protected ranking
- ITF = ITF entry
- JE = Junior exempt
- w/o = Walkover
- r = Retired
- d = Defaulted
- SR = Special ranking

=== All Comers' ===
Quarterfinals			Semifinals			Final
			(United Kingdom) Lena Rice	6	6
(United Kingdom) May Jacks	6	6	(United Kingdom) May Jacks	2	0
(United Kingdom) Mary Steedman	4	2				(United Kingdom) Lena Rice	6	6	4
(United Kingdom) Blanche Hillyard	6	6				(United Kingdom) Blanche Hillyard	4	8	6
(United Kingdom) Annie Rice	3	0	(United Kingdom) Blanche Hillyard	8	6
			(United Kingdom) Bertha Steedman	6	1

Preceded by 1888 U.S. National Championships – Women's singles	Grand Slam women's singles	Succeeded by 1889 U.S. National Championships – Women's singles
