= 1888 Wimbledon Championships – Men's singles =

Men's singles
- 1888 Wimbledon Championships

Final
- Champion: (United Kingdom) Ernest Renshaw
- Runner-up: (United Kingdom) Herbert Lawford
- Score: 6–3, 7–5, 6–0

Details
- Draw: 24
- Seeds: –

Events
Singles	men	women
Doubles	men	women
- Wimbledon Championships

Ernest Renshaw defeated Ernest Lewis 7–9, 6–1, 8–6, 6–4 in the All Comers' Final, and then defeated the reigning champion Herbert Lawford 6–3, 7–5, 6–0 in the challenge round to win the gentlemen's singles tennis title at the 1888 Wimbledon Championships.

== Draw ==
Key

- Q = Qualifier
- WC = Wild card
- LL = Lucky loser
- Alt = Alternate
- ITF = ITF entry
- PR = Protected ranking
- SR = Special ranking
- SE = Special exempt
- JE = Junior exempt
- JR = Junior Accelerator Programme entrant
- CO = College Accelerator Programme entrant
- NG = Next Gen Accelerator Program entrant
- w/o = Walkover
- r = Retired
- d = Defaulted

=== Challenge round ===
Challenge Round
(United Kingdom) Ernest Renshaw	6	7	6
(United Kingdom) Herbert Lawford	3	5	0

=== All comers' finals ===
Semifinals
(United Kingdom) Ernest Renshaw	7	7	5	6
(United Kingdom) Willoughby Hamilton	5	5	7	3
(United Kingdom) Ernest Lewis	9	6	6
(United Kingdom) William Taylor	7	4	4

Final
(United Kingdom) Ernest Renshaw	7	6	8	6
(United Kingdom) Ernest Lewis	9	1	6	4

=== Top half ===
First round
(United Kingdom) Willoughby Hamilton	7	4	6	6
(United Kingdom) Ernest Meers	5	6	4	2
(United Kingdom) FA Bowlby	6	0	6	5	6
(United Kingdom) TS Campion	3	6	2	7	4
(United Kingdom) William Renshaw	6	6	6
(United Kingdom) Herbert Chipp	4	4	2
(United Kingdom) Harry Grove	7	6	7
(United Kingdom) Harry Barlow	5	4	5

Second round
(United Kingdom) Ernest Renshaw	6	6	7
(United Kingdom) George Mewburn	1	4	5
(United Kingdom) Herbert Wilberforce	4	6	6	4	6
(United Kingdom) Charles Lacy Sweet	6	3	0	6	1
(United Kingdom) W Hamilton	6	6	6
(United Kingdom) FA Bowlby	1	1	4
(United Kingdom) W Renshaw	5	14	6	6
(United Kingdom) H Grove	7	12	3	2

Quarterfinals
(United Kingdom) E Renshaw	4	6	7	4	6
(United Kingdom) H Wilberforce	6	3	5	6	0
(United Kingdom) W Hamilton	5	7	6	6
(United Kingdom) W Renshaw	7	5	4	2

Semifinals
(United Kingdom) E Renshaw	7	7	5	6
(United Kingdom) W Hamilton	5	5	7	3

=== Bottom half ===
First round
(United Kingdom) Charles Eames	6	5	6	7
(United Kingdom) A Walker	2	7	1	5
(United Kingdom) Ernest Lewis	6	6	6
(United Kingdom) Patrick Bowes-Lyon	1	2	3
(United Kingdom) Charles Ross	6	6	7	6
(United Kingdom) Oswald Milne	8	4	5	2
(United Kingdom) Harry Scrivener	6	6	1	6
(United Kingdom) Michael G. McNamara	4	4	6	3

Second round
(United Kingdom) C Eames	1	0	3
(United Kingdom) E Lewis	6	6	6
(United Kingdom) C Ross	3	5	7
(United Kingdom) H Scrivener	6	7	9
(United Kingdom) William Taylor	3	3	6	6	6
(United Kingdom) Arthur Gore	6	6	2	3	3
(United Kingdom) AG Ziffo	8	3	0^{r}
(United Kingdom) Frederick Rawson	10	6	3

Quarterfinals
(United Kingdom) E Lewis	7	6	6
(United Kingdom) H Scrivener	5	3	1
(United Kingdom) W Taylor	6	6	4	4	6
(United Kingdom) FL Rawson	4	0	6	6	1

Semifinals
(United Kingdom) E Lewis	9	6	6
(United Kingdom) W Taylor	7	4	4

Preceded by 1887 U.S. National Championships – Men's singles	Grand Slam men's singles	Succeeded by 1889 U.S. National Championships – Men's singles
