= Quincy Shaw =

American tennis player

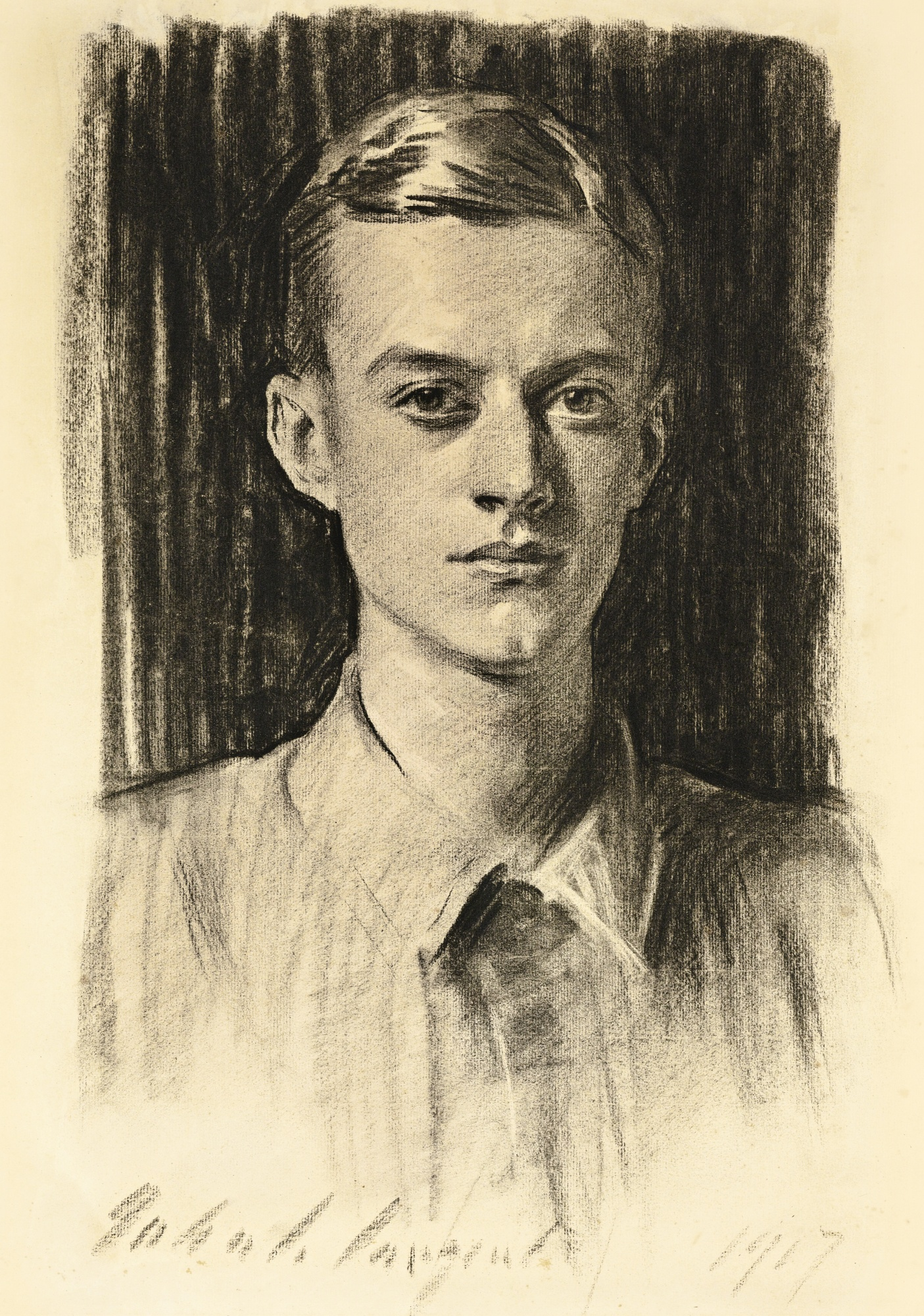
- Portrait of Shaw by John Singer Sargent
- Full name: Quincy Adams Shaw Jr.
- Country (sports): United States
- Born: July 30, 1869; Boston, Massachusetts, U.S.
- Died: May 8, 1960 (aged 90); Boston, Massachusetts, U.S.
- Turned pro: 1884 (amateur tour)
- Retired: 1894
- Plays: Left-handed (one-handed backhand)

Singles
- Career titles: 3

Grand Slam singles results
- US Open: F (1889^{Ch})

Quincy Adams Shaw Jr. (July 30, 1869 – May 8, 1960) was a left-handed tennis player from the United States.

Shaw won the NCAA Men's Tennis Championships in doubles for Harvard University in 1887 and 1890, and reached the Challenge Round in singles at the U.S. National Championships in 1889 (beating Oliver Campbell, then losing to Henry Slocum). He was among the top 10 American tennis players in 1887 and 1889.

== Grand Slam finals ==
=== Singles (1 runner-up) ===
Result	Year	Championship	Surface	Opponent	Score
Loss	1889	U.S. Championships	Grass	(United States) Henry Slocum	3–6, 1–6, 6–4, 2–6
