= Margarette Ballard =

American tennis player

- Country (sports): United States
- Born: December 20, 1866

Doubles

Grand Slam doubles results
- US Open: 1st (1889); Runner-up (1890)

Margarette Ballard (December 20, 1866 – unknown) was an American tennis player from the end of the 19th century.

In 1889, she won the first women's doubles at the U.S. Women's National Championship with Bertha Townsend.

== Grand Slam finals ==
=== Doubles (1 title, 1 runners-up) ===
| Result | Year | Championship | Surface | Partner | Opponents | Score |
|---|---|---|---|---|---|---|
| Win | 1889 | U.S. Championships | Grass | (United States) Bertha Townsend | (United States) Marion Wright (United States) Laura Knight | 6–2, 6–0 |
| Loss | 1890 | U.S. Championships | Grass | (United States) Bertha Townsend | (United States) Grace Roosevelt (United States) Ellen Roosevelt | 1–6, 2–6 |
