= John Ryerson (tennis) =

American tennis player

- Full name: John Albert Ryerson
- Country (sports): United States
- Born: March 1866; New York, U.S.
- Died: May 16, 1910 (aged 44); Chicago, Illinois, U.S.
- Turned pro: 1886 (amateur tour)
- Retired: 1903

Singles

Grand Slam singles results
- US Open: QF (1888, 1890)

John Albert Ryerson (March 1866 – May 16, 1910) was an American tennis player active in the late 19th century.

== Tennis career ==
Ryerson reached the quarterfinals in the 1888 U.S. Nationals Championships Men's Singles, losing to PS Sears. He reached the quarterfinals in the 1890 U.S. Nationals Championships Men's Singles, losing to O Campbell who went on to win the tournament. And with Charles Carver, he reached the Men's Doubles finals in 1890.

He was the runner up in the 1890 & 1892 Western States Men's Singles Championships, losing to Samuel Chase both times. He and J.W. Carver won the August 1890 Men's Doubles Tournament held at the Hotel Wentworth in, New Castle, N.H., defeating Hovey and Wright. And he and C.W. Carver won the July 1892 Western States Men's Doubles held at the Riverside Lawn Tennis Club of Chicago, defeating Cole and Paddock.
