= Lida Voorhees =

American tennis player

- Full name: Eliza Day Voorhees Rodewald
- Country (sports): United States
- Born: July 3, 1864; Roseville, Newark, New Jersey
- Died: February, 1934

Singles

Grand Slam singles results
- US Open: F (1889)

Eliza Day 'Lida' Voorhees (July 3, 1864 – February, 1934) was an American female tennis player who was active in the late 19th century.

== Career ==
Voorhees reached the challenge round of the 1889 women's singles U.S. National Championships at the Philadelphia Cricket Club, the third championship held, in which she lost to defending champion Bertha Townsend in straight sets, 5–7, 2–6. She had won the right to challenge Townsend by winning the all-comers tournament, defeating Helen Day Harris in the final in three sets. In 1890, she again reached the final of the all-comers tournament, which she lost to Ellen Roosevelt. The latter defeated Townsend in the challenge round. In 1891, Voorhees made it to the semifinals of the all-comers tournament, where she was defeated by eventual champion Mabel Cahill from Ireland.

== Personal life ==
Voorhees married Arthur Ferdinand Rodewald on April 27, 1892, in Trinity Church, Bergen Point. They had three sons (Frederick Arthur, b. March 3, 1893, Winthrop Voorhees, b. Dec. 22, 1894, Ferdinand Kingsley, b. Dec. 20, 1897). She was granted a decree of divorce, with custody of her children in New York on December 1, 1910.

== Grand Slam finals ==
=== Singles (1 runner-up) ===
Result	Year	Championship	Surface	Opponent	Scoree
Loss	1889	U.S. Championships	Grass	(United States) Bertha Townsend	5–7, 2–6
