= Clarence Hobart =

American tennis player

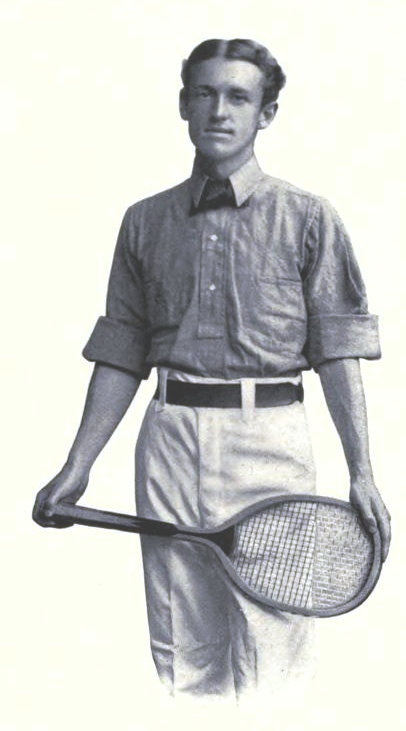
- Country (sports): United States
- Born: June 27, 1870; Waltham, Massachusetts, U.S.
- Died: August 2, 1930 (aged 60); Asheville, North Carolina, U.S.
- Turned pro: 1888 (amateur tour)
- Retired: 1919
- Plays: Right-handed (one-handed backhand)

Singles
- Career record: 201–70 (74.1%)
- Career titles: 18

Grand Slam singles results
- Wimbledon: SF (1898)
- US Open: F (1891^{Ch}, 1905)

Doubles

Grand Slam doubles results
- Wimbledon: F (1898, 1899)
- US Open: W (1890, 1893, 1894)

Grand Slam mixed doubles results
- US Open: W (1892, 1893, 1905)

Clarence Hobart (June 27, 1870 – August 2, 1930) was a tennis player from the United States. He was a six-time champion at the U.S. National Championships, winning three titles in men's doubles in 1890, 1893 and 1894 and three others in mixed doubles in 1892, 1893 and 1905. Hobart also reached the Challenge Round in the Gentlemen's Singles in 1891, finishing runner-up.

In 1905 he won the mixed doubles title at the U.S. National Championship with Augusta Schultz whom he married in 1895.

In 1899 he won the Championship of Germany, played in Homburg, by defeating A.W. Gore in the final in three straight sets and subsequently winning against Irishman Harold Mahony in the challenge round in five sets. At the same venue he reached the final of the Homburg Cup but lost in five sets to Wimbledon champion Reggie Doherty after leading 2–0 in sets. During a 1903 tour in Europe he reached the finals of the Kent Championships and the Ostend International tournament in Belgium but was defeated by A.W. Gore and Paul de Borman respectively.

In 1907 Hobart competed in the Longwood Bowl, at the time the most important tournament in the U.S. next to the national championship, and won the All-Comers tournament. This entitled him to play for the tournament title in the Challenge Round against Larned, the winner of the previous title, but he refused to play explaining "For many years I have opposed the practice of permitting the holders to stand out in our tournaments,... on the obvious ground that it is unjust to pit a tired man against a fresh one, and equally unjust to give the holder only one chance for defeat while the challenger must necessarily have several.". His refusal contributed to the abandonment in 1912 of the Challenge Round system at the U.S. National Championships.

Clarence Hobart died on August 2, 1930, as a result of an accident at a swimming pool in Asheville, NC.

== Grand Slam finals ==
=== Singles (1 runner-up) ===
Result	Year	Championship	Surface	Opponent	Score
Loss	1891	U.S. National Championships	Grass	(United States) Oliver Campbell	6–2, 5–7, 9–7, 1–6, 2–6

=== Doubles (3 titles, 5 runner-ups) ===
Result	Year	Championship	Surface	Partner	Opponents	Score
Loss	1888	U.S. National Championships	Grass	(United States) Edward MacMullen	(United States) Oliver Campbell (United States) Valentine Hall	4–6, 2–6, 2–6
Win	1890	U.S. National Championships	Grass	(United States) Valentine Hall	(United States) Charles Carver (United States) John Ryerson	6–3, 4–6, 6–2, 2–6, 6–3
Loss	1891	U.S. National Championships	Grass	(United States) Valentine Hall	(United States) Oliver Campbell (United States) Robert Huntington	3–6, 4–6, 6–8
Win	1893	U.S. National Championships	Grass	(United States) Fred Hovey	(United States) Oliver Campbell (United States) Robert Huntington	6–3, 6–4, 4–6, 6–2
Win	1894	U.S. National Championships	Grass	(United States) Fred Hovey	(United States) Carr Neel (United States) Sam Neel	6–3, 8–6, 6–1
Loss	1895	U.S. National Championships	Grass	(United States) Fred Hovey	(United States) Malcolm Chace (United States) Robert Wrenn	5–7, 1–6, 6–8
Loss	1898	Wimbledon Championships	Grass	(United Kingdom) Harold Nisbet	(United Kingdom) Reginald Doherty (United Kingdom) Laurence Doherty	4–6, 4–6, 2–6
Loss	1899	Wimbledon Championships	Grass	(United Kingdom) Harold Nisbet	(United Kingdom) Reginald Doherty (United Kingdom) Laurence Doherty	5–7, 0–6, 2–6

=== Mixed doubles (3 titles) ===
Result	Year	Championship	Surface	Partner	Opponents	Score
Win	1892	U.S. National Championships	Grass	(United Kingdom) Mabel Cahill	(United States) Elisabeth Moore (United States) Rodmond Beach	6–1, 6–3
Win	1893	U.S. National Championships	Grass	(United States) Ellen Roosevelt	(United States) Ethel Bankson (United States) Robert Willson Jr.	6–4, 4–6, 10–6
Win	1905	U.S. National Championships	Grass	(United States) Augusta Schultz	(United States) Elisabeth Moore (Australia) Edward Dewhurst	6–2, 6–4
