= Grace Roosevelt =

American tennis player

- Full name: Grace Walton Roosevelt
- Country (sports): USA
- Born: June 3, 1867 Hyde Park, New York, U.S.
- Died: November 29, 1945 (aged 78) Hyde Park, New York, U.S.
- Plays: Right-handed

Grand Slam singles results
- US Open: F(1891)

Grand Slam doubles results
- US Open: W (1890)

Grand Slam mixed doubles results
- US Open: W (1889) not official

Grace Walton Roosevelt (married name Appleton Clark) (June 3, 1867 – November 29, 1945) was an American tennis player of the end of the 19th century, born in Hyde Park, New York.

== Early life ==
She was a daughter of John Aspinwall Roosevelt, an estate proprietor, and Ellen Murray Crosby. She started playing tennis with her sister Ellen in 1879 when her father installed a tennis court at their mansion.

== Career ==
In 1889, she won the unofficial mixed doubles title at the U.S. National Championship with A.E. Wright. She won the doubles title in 1890 with her sister Ellen, defeating compatriots Margarette Ballard and Bertha Townsend in two sets.

=== Grand Slam finals ===
==== Doubles (1 title, 1 runner-up) ====
Result	Year	Championship	Surface	Partner	Opponents	Score
Win	1890	U.S. National Championships	Grass	(United States) Ellen Roosevelt	(United States) Margarette Ballard (United States) Bertha Townsend	6–1, 6–2
Loss	1891	U.S. National Championships	Grass	(United States) Ellen Roosevelt	(United Kingdom of Great Britain and Ireland) (Note: At this time, Ireland was part of the United Kingdom.) Mabel Cahill (United States) Emma Leavitt-Morgan	6–2, 6–8, 4–6

==== Mixed doubles (1 title, 1 runner-up) ====
Result	Year	Championship	Surface	Partner	Opponents	Score
Win	1889	U.S. National Championships	Grass	(United States) A. E. Wright	(United States) Bertha Townsend (United States) C. T. Lee	6–1, 6–3, 3–6, 6–3
Loss	1891	U.S. National Championships	Grass	(United States) C. T. Lee	(United Kingdom of Great Britain and Ireland) Mabel Cahill (United States) M. R. Wright	4–6, 0–6, 5–7

== Personal life ==
In 1895, she married lawyer Appleton LeSure Clark and had two sons, Russell and Roosevelt. She returned to her parents' mansion after her husband's death in 1930. She was a first cousin of Franklin Delano Roosevelt, 32nd president of the United States.
