= Marion Thompson Wright =

Scholar and activist (1902–1962)

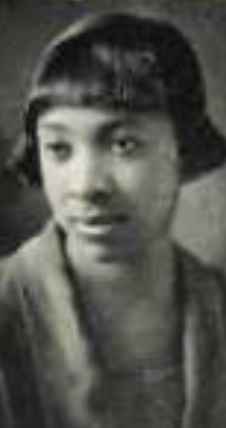
- Marion Manola Thompson, from the 1927 yearbook of Howard University
- Born: Marion Manola Thompson; September 12, 1902; East Orange, New Jersey
- Died: October 26, 1962 (aged 60)
- Occupations: Scholar, historian

Marion Thompson Wright (September 12, 1902 – October 26, 1962) was an African-American scholar and activist. In 1940, Wright became the first African-American woman in the United States to earn her Ph.D. in history.

== Early life ==
Marion Manola Thompson Wright was born in East Orange, New Jersey, on September 12, 1902, to Minnie Thompson and Moses R. Thompson. Wright was the youngest of four children, and had two older twin sisters and a brother who died at a young age.

Few details are available on Thompson's youth, but she attended Barringer High School in Newark, New Jersey. Even as a teenager, she expressed her frustrations with the New Jersey school system as one of two Black students at her high school.

== Personal life ==
At the age of 16, Wright married William Moss and had two children, Thelma and James. Wright made the decision to leave her children with her husband in order to continue to pursue her high school degree. This was due to the expectations that women were not to be accepted into higher universities if they were married or divorced. A few years later, Wright divorced from her husband, leaving her children with her mother while continuing to pursue her education. Wright married Arthur M. Wright, but divorced soon after.

== Education ==
After graduating from high school, Wright attended Howard University, where she received her bachelor's degree in 1927, before earning her master's in History and Education. After this, she attended Teachers College, Columbia University where she began her work on her dissertation. Wright completed her dissertation, "The Education of Negroes in New Jersey", which focused on the state of education for Blacks and its consistent segregated and unjust schools. Wright became the first Black woman in the United States to earn her Ph.D. in history in 1940.

After earning her Ph.D., Wright went back to Howard, where she taught. She began the Negro History Bulletin to educate students on their Black history. In the 1950s, she worked with the National Association for the Advancement of Colored People (NAACP). In addition, Wright's dissertation was incorporated into the Brown v. Board of Education argument.

== Death and legacy ==
At the age of 60, Wright's body was found unresponsive inside her car in her garage. Her death certificate states that she died of cardiopulmonary failure; however, some sources state that she committed suicide.

Each year, Rutgers University–Newark hosts an annual Marion Thompson Wright Lecture Series. The event is a part of the celebration of Black History Month and in February 2018, Rutgers celebrated their 38th annual lecture series.
