= Bertha Townsend =

American tennis player

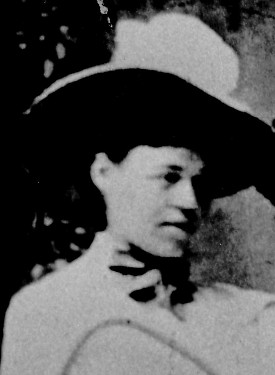
- Full name: Bertha Louise Townsend Toulmin
- Country (sports): USA
- Born: March 7, 1869 Philadelphia, Pennsylvania
- Died: May 12, 1909 (aged 40)
- Plays: Left-handed
- Int. Tennis HoF: 1974 (member page)

Singles

Grand Slam singles results
- US Open: W (1888, 1889)

Doubles

Grand Slam doubles results
- US Open: W (1889)

Grand Slam mixed doubles results
- US Open: F (1889, 1890) not official

Bertha Louise Townsend Toulmin (née Townsend; March 7, 1869 – May 12, 1909) was a female tennis player from the United States. She is best remembered for being the first repeating women's singles champion at the U.S. Championships (now U.S. Open) in 1888 and 1889. She developed the underhand technique.

She was inducted into the International Tennis Hall of Fame in 1974.

== Grand Slam finals ==
=== Singles (2 titles, 1 runner-up) ===
Result	Year	Championship	Surface	Opponent	Score
Win	1888	U.S. Championships	Grass	(United States) Ellen Hansell	6–3, 6–5
Win	1889	U.S. Championships	Grass	(United States) Lida Voorhees	7–5, 6–2
Loss	1890	U.S. Championships	Grass	(United States) Ellen Roosevelt	2–6, 2–6

=== Doubles (1 title, 1 runners-up) ===
Result	Year	Championship	Surface	Partner	Opponents	Score
Win	1889	U.S. Championships	Grass	(United States) Margarette Ballard	(United States) Marion Wright (United States) Laura Knight	6–2, 6–0
Loss	1890	U.S. Championships	Grass	(United States) Margarette Ballard	(United States) Grace Roosevelt (United States) Ellen Roosevelt	1–6, 2–6
