= Ellen Roosevelt =

American tennis player

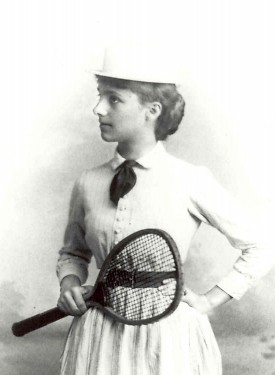
- Roosevelt holding a tennis racket
- Full name: Ellen Crosby Roosevelt
- Country (sports): USA
- Born: August 20, 1868; Rosedale, New York, U.S.
- Died: September 26, 1954 (aged 86); Hyde Park, New York, U.S.
- Int. Tennis HoF: 1975 (member page)

Singles

Grand Slam singles results
- US Open: W (1890)

Doubles

Grand Slam doubles results
- US Open: W (1890)

Grand Slam mixed doubles results
- US Open: W (1893)

Ellen Crosby Roosevelt (August 20, 1868 – September 26, 1954) was an American tennis player. Roosevelt was a daughter of John Aspinwall Roosevelt, an estate proprietor, and Ellen Murray Crosby. She started playing tennis with her sister Grace in 1879 when her father installed a tennis court at their mansion.

She won the women's singles title at the 1890 U.S. Championships defeating the 1888 and 1889 champion Bertha Townsend in the final in two sets. The same year, she won the doubles title with her sister. They were the first pair of sisters to win the U.S. Championships and remained the only pair to do so until the Williams sisters equalled their achievement in 1999. At the 1893 U.S. Championships, she won the mixed doubles title with Oliver Campbell. Her other career singles highlights include winning the Staten Island Ladies Club Open in 1890.

She was a first cousin of Franklin D. Roosevelt, and she was posthumously inducted into the International Tennis Hall of Fame in 1975.

== Grand Slam finals ==
=== Singles (1 title) ===
Result	Year	Championship	Surface	Opponent	Score
Win	1890	U.S. National Championships	Grass	(United States) Bertha Townsend	6–2, 6–2

=== Doubles (1 title) ===
Result	Year	Championship	Surface	Partner	Opponents	Score
Win	1890	U.S. National Championships	Grass	(United States) Grace Roosevelt	(United States) Margarette Ballard (United States) Bertha Townsend	6–1, 6–2

=== Mixed doubles (1 title) ===
Result	Year	Championship	Surface	Partner	Opponents	Score
Win	1893	U.S. National Championships	Grass	(United States) Clarence Hobart	(United States) Ethel Bankson (United States) Robert Willson Jr.	6–4, 4–6, 10–6
