= Valentine Hall =

American tennis player

- Full name: Valentine Gill Hall III
- Country (sports): United States
- Born: November 12, 1867; New York, NY, United States
- Died: October 26, 1934 (aged 66)
- Turned pro: 1886 (amateur tour)
- Retired: 1894

Singles
- Career titles: 12

Grand Slam singles results
- US Open: SF (1891)

Doubles

Grand Slam doubles results
- US Open: W (1888, 1890)

Valentine Gill "Vallie" Hall III (November 12, 1867, New York – October 26, 1934) was an American tennis player who was active in the late 19th century. He was the elder son of Valentine Gill Hall Jr. and Mary Livingston Ludlow of the Livingston family. Vallie's eldest sister was Anna Rebecca Hall, making him an uncle of First Lady of the United States, Anna Eleanor Roosevelt.

== Career ==
In 1888 and 1890 he won the Doubles title at the U.S. National Championships, also reaching the semi-finals in the Singles in 1891 (and the quarter-finals in 1890, 1892 and 1893).

Hall twice won the singles title at the Hudson River Championships, in 1888 and 1890. In 1891 he won the Southampton Invitation tennis tournament staged at the Meadow Club, Southampton, NY. Together with his brother Edward Ludlow Hall (1872–1932) he won the National Eastern Doubles Championships in 1892.

In 1889 he wrote a book titled Lawn Tennis in America containing biographical sketches of prominent players. He was a secretary of the United States National Lawn Tennis Association.

== Grand Slam finals ==
=== Doubles (2 titles, 3 runner-ups) ===
Result	Year	Championship	Surface	Partner	Opponents	Score
Win	1888	U.S. Championships	Grass	(United States) Oliver Campbell	(United States) Clarence Hobart (United States) E.P. Macmullen	6–4, 6–2, 6–2
Loss	1889	U.S. Championships	Grass	(United States) Oliver Campbell	(United States) Henry Slocum (United States) Howard Taylor	1–6, 3–6, 2–6
Win	1890	U.S. Championships	Grass	(United States) Clarence Hobart	(United States) Charles Carver (United States) John Ryerson	6–3, 4–6, 6–2, 2–6, 6–3
Loss	1891	U.S. Championships	Grass	(United States) Clarence Hobart	(United States) Oliver Campbell (United States) Bob Huntington	3–6, 4–6, 6–8
Loss	1892	U.S. Championships	Grass	(United States) Edward L. Hall	(United States) Oliver Campbell (United States) Bob Huntington	4–6, 2–6, 6–4, 3–6
