= Oliver Campbell =

American tennis player (1871–1953)

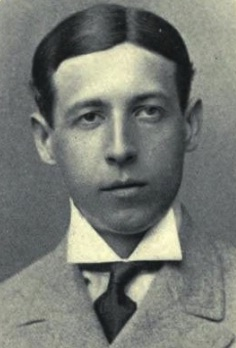
- Full name: Oliver Samuel Edward Michael Campbell
- Country (sports): United States
- Born: February 25, 1871 Brooklyn, NY, U.S.
- Died: July 11, 1953 (aged 82) Campbellton, New Brunswick, Canada
- Turned pro: 1886 (amateur tour)
- Retired: 1892
- Int. Tennis HoF: 1955 (member page)

Singles
- Career titles: 17
- Highest ranking: No. 8 (1890, ITHF)

Grand Slam singles results
- Wimbledon: 2R (1892)
- US Open: W (1890, 1891, 1892)

Grand Slam doubles results
- Wimbledon: SF (1892)
- US Open: W (1890, 1891, 1892)

Oliver Samuel Edward Michael Campbell (February 25, 1871 – July 11, 1953) was an American male tennis player who won the three consecutive singles titles at the U.S. Championships from 1890 through 1892.

== Education ==
Campbell was educated at Columbia College, graduating in 1891 and was posthumously inducted into the Athletics Hall of Fame in 2010.

== Career ==
For over a century, Campbell remained the youngest male player to win the U.S. singles title. At the time of his win in 1890, he was 19 years, 6 months and 9 days old. Fellow American Pete Sampras broke Campbell's record, aged 19 years and 28 days, when he won the title in 1990.

Campbell defended his title in the challenge round matches in 1891, defeating Clarence Hobart, and in 1892, defeating Fred Hovey, but did not defend it in 1893 and thereby defaulted the title to Robert Wrenn. The challenge round against Clarence Hobart was the first title match played over five sets.

In addition to his singles titles Campbell won the men's doubles titles at the U.S. National Championships in 1888, 1891 and 1892.

His other career singles highlights include winning the Tropical Championships on hard courts at the St. Augustine, Florida on four occasions (1889–1891, 1894). he also won the Englewood Open twice (1987–1888). He won single events at the New York Tennis Club Open (1886), the Orange Spring Tournament (1887), the Westchester Lawn Tennis Club (Invitation) (1888), the Elberon Casino Invitation (1888), New Hamburg Invitation (1888), the Nahant Invitation (1890), South Side Field Club (1890) and the Narragansette Pier Open (1890). In addition he was a finalist at the Flushing Athletic Club Open (1889).

Campbell was inducted into the International Tennis Hall of Fame in 1955.

== Grand Slam finals ==
=== Singles (3 titles) ===
Result	Year	Championship	Surface	Opponent	Score
Win	1890	U.S. Championships	Grass	(United States) Henry Slocum	6–2, 4–6, 6–3, 6–1
Win	1891	U.S. Championships	Grass	(United States) Clarence Hobart	2–6, 7–5, 7–9, 6–1, 6–2
Win	1892	U.S. Championships	Grass	(United States) Fred Hovey	7–5, 3–6, 6–3, 7–5

=== Doubles (3 titles, 2 runner-ups) ===
Result	Year	Championship	Surface	Partner	Opponents	Score
Win	1888	U.S. Championships	Grass	(United States) Valentine Hall	(United States) Clarence Hobart (United States) Edward MacMullen	6–4, 6–2, 6–4
Loss	1889	U.S. Championships	Grass	(United States) Valentine Hall	(United States) Henry Slocum (United States) Howard Taylor	1–6, 3–6, 2–6
Win	1891	U.S. Championships	Grass	(United States) Bob Huntington	(United States) Valentine Hall (United States) Clarence Hobart	6–3, 6–4, 8–6
Win	1892	U.S. Championships	Grass	(United States) Bob Huntington	(United States) Edward L. Hall (United States) Valentine Hall	6–4, 6–2, 4–6, 6–3
Loss	1893	U.S. Championships	Grass	(United States) Bob Huntington	(United States) Clarence Hobart (United States) Fred Hovey	3–6, 4–6, 6–4, 2–6
