= List of US Open men's doubles champions =

US Open Men's Doubles Champions
- Location: Flushing Meadows, Queens; New York City; United States
- Venue: USTA Billie Jean King National Tennis Center
- Governing body: USTA
- Created: 1881; 145 years ago
- Editions: 145 events (2025); 58 events (Open Era)
- Surface: Grass (1881–1974); Clay (Note: Played on HarTru surface.) (1975–1977); Hard (Note: Played on DecoTurf surface.) (1978–present)
- Prize money: Total: US$65,000,000 (2023); Winner: US$700,000 (2023)
- Trophy: US Open Trophy
- Website: Official website

Most titles
- Amateur era: 6: Richard Sears; 6: Holcombe Ward
- Open era: 6 Mike Bryan

Most consecutive titles
- Amateur era: 6: Richard Sears
- Open era: 3: Rajeev Ram; 3: Joe Salisbury

Current champion
- Christian Harrison; Neal Skupski

The inaugural US Open men's doubles tennis tournament, in 1881, was reserved for United States National Lawn Tennis Association (USNLTA) club members and was won by Clarence Clark and Frederick Winslow Taylor. The following year, 1882, the championships opened to international competitors. Between 1890 and 1906 sectional tournaments were held in the east and the west of the country to determine the best two doubles teams, which competed in a play-off in Newport to see who would play the defending champions in the challenge round. The challenge system was abolished in 1920. The doubles event was held in various locations; Newport (1881–1914), Forest Hills (1915–1916, 1942–1945, 1968–1977), Longwood (1917–1933, 1935–1941, 1946–1967) and Germantown, Philadelphia (1934) before it settled in 1978 at the USTA National Tennis Center, now the USTA Billie Jean King National Tennis Center, in New York City.

== Champions ==
=== U.S. National Championships ===
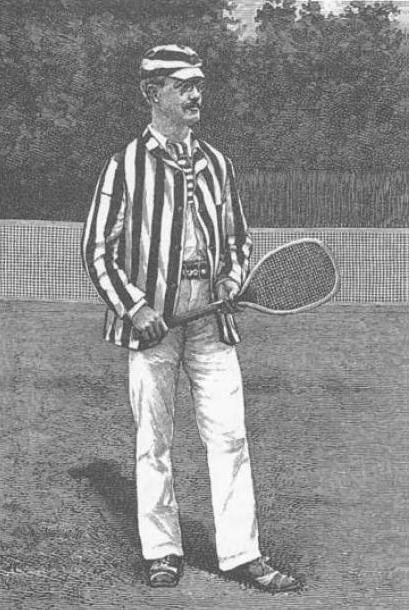
Richard Sears won six doubles titles (1882, 1883, 1884, 1885, 1886 and 1887).

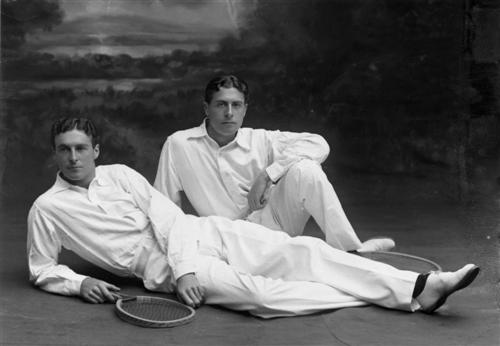
The English brothers Laurence and Reginald Doherty won the Men's Doubles in 1902 and 1903.

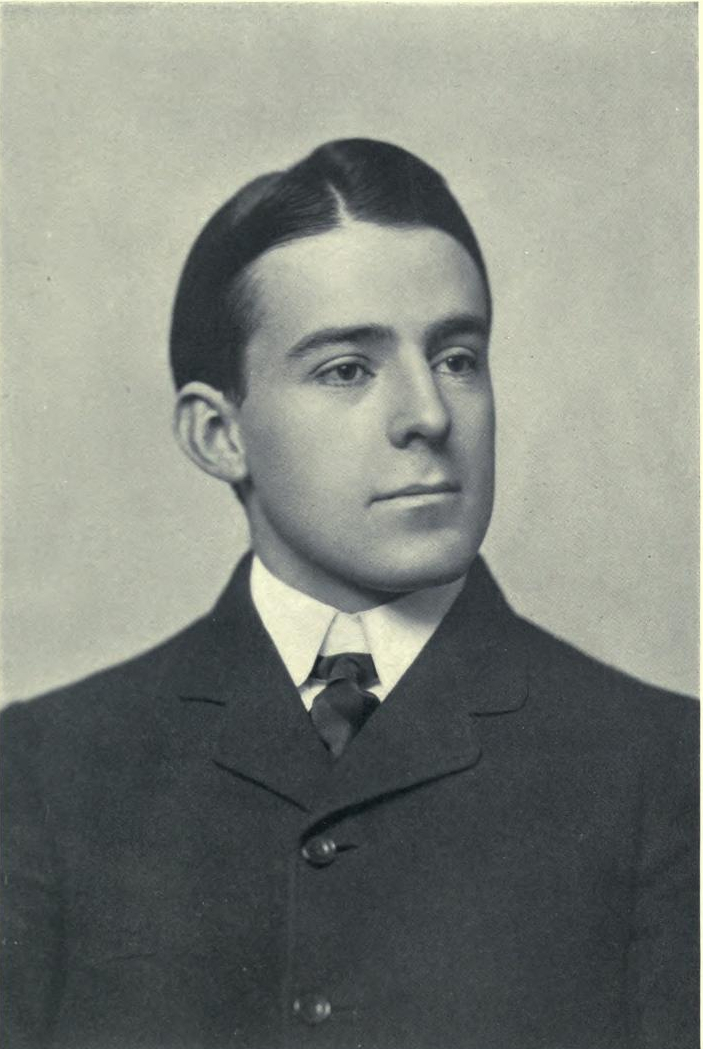
Holcombe Ward won six doubles titles. Three with Dwight Davis and three with Beals Wright.

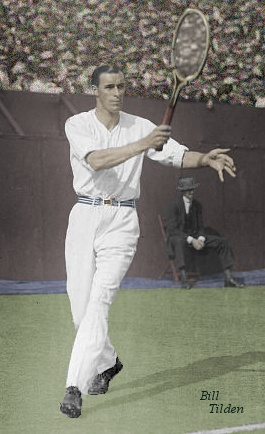
Bill Tilden won five doubles titles (1918, 1921, 1922, 1923 and 1927) with three different partners.

The following pairings won the U.S. Open tennis championship, or its predecessor United States National tennis championship, in Men's Doubles.

Year	Champions	Runners-up	Score
1881	(United States) Clarence Clark (United States) Frederick Winslow Taylor	(United States) Alexander Van Rensselaer (United States) Arthur E. Newbold	6–5, 6–4, 6–5
1882	(United States) Richard Sears (United States) James Dwight	(United States) Crawford Nightingale (United States) G. M. Smith	6–2, 6–4, 6–4
1883	(United States) Richard Sears (United States) James Dwight	(United States) Alexander Van Rensselaer (United States) Arthur E. Newbold	6–0, 6–2, 6–2
1884	(United States) Richard Sears (United States) James Dwight	(United States) Alexander Van Rensselaer (United States) Walter Van Rensselaer Berry	6–4, 6–1, 8–10, 6–4
1885	(United States) Richard Sears (United States) Joseph Clark	(United States) Henry Slocum (United States) Wallace P. Knapp	6–3, 6–0, 6–2
1886	(United States) Richard Sears (United States) James Dwight	(United States) Howard Taylor (United States) Godfrey Brinley	7–5, 6–8, 7–5, 6–4
1887	(United States) Richard Sears (United States) James Dwight	(United States) Howard Taylor (United States) Henry Slocum	6–4, 3–6, 2–6, 6–3, 6–3
1888	(United States) Oliver Campbell (United States) Valentine Hall	(United States) Clarence Hobart (United States) Edward MacMullen	6–4, 6–2, 6–2
1889	(United States) Henry Slocum (United States) Howard Taylor	(United States) Valentine Hall (United States) Oliver Campbell	6–1, 6–3, 6–2
1890	(United States) Valentine Hall (United States) Clarence Hobart	(United States) Charles Carver (United States) John Ryerson	6–3, 4–6, 6–2, 2–6, 6–3
1891	(United States) Oliver Campbell (United States) Bob Huntington	(United States) Valentine Hall (United States) Clarence Hobart	6–3, 6–4, 8–6
1892	(United States) Oliver Campbell (United States) Bob Huntington	(United States) Valentine Hall (United States) Edward L. Hall	6–4, 6–2, 4–6, 6–3
1893	(United States) Clarence Hobart (United States) Fred Hovey	(United States) Oliver Campbell (United States) Bob Huntington	6–3, 6–4, 4–6, 6–2
1894	(United States) Clarence Hobart (United States) Fred Hovey	(United States) Carr Neel (United States) Sam Neel	6–3, 8–6, 6–1
1895	(United States) Malcolm Chace (United States) Robert Wrenn	(United States) Clarence Hobart (United States) Fred Hovey	7–5, 6–1, 8–6
1896	(United States) Carr Neel (United States) Sam Neel	(United States) Robert Wrenn (United States) Malcolm Chace	6–3, 1–6, 6–1, 3–6, 6–1
1897	(United States) Leo Ware (United States) George Sheldon	(United Kingdom of Great Britain and Ireland) Harold Mahony (United Kingdom of Great Britain and Ireland) Harold Nisbet	11–13, 6–2, 9–7, 1–6, 6–1
1898	(United States) Leo Ware (United States) George Sheldon	(United States) Holcombe Ward (United States) Dwight F. Davis	1–6, 7–5, 6–4, 4–6, 7–5
1899	(United States) Holcombe Ward (United States) Dwight F. Davis	(United States) Leo Ware (United States) George Sheldon	6–4, 6–4, 6–3
1900	(United States) Holcombe Ward (United States) Dwight F. Davis	(United States) Fred Alexander (United States) Raymond Little	6–4, 9–7, 12–10
1901	(United States) Holcombe Ward (United States) Dwight F. Davis	(United States) Leo Ware (United States) Beals Wright	6–3, 9–7, 6–1
1902	(United Kingdom of Great Britain and Ireland) Reginald Doherty (United Kingdom of Great Britain and Ireland) Laurence Doherty	(United States) Holcombe Ward (United States) Dwight F. Davis	11–9, 12–10, 6–4
1903	(United Kingdom of Great Britain and Ireland) Reginald Doherty (United Kingdom of Great Britain and Ireland) Laurence Doherty	(United States) Kreigh Collins (United States) L. Harry Waidner	7–5, 6–3, 6–3
1904	(United States) Holcombe Ward (United States) Beals Wright	(United States) Kreigh Collins (United States) Raymond Little	1–6, 6–2, 3–6, 6–4, 6–1
1905	(United States) Holcombe Ward (United States) Beals Wright	(United States) Fred Alexander (United States) Harold Hackett	6–4, 6–4, 6–1
1906	(United States) Holcombe Ward (United States) Beals Wright	(United States) Fred Alexander (United States) Harold Hackett	6–3, 3–6, 6–3, 6–3
1907	(United States) Fred Alexander (United States) Harold Hackett	(United States) Nat Thornton (United States) Bryan M. Grant	6–2, 6–1, 6–1
1908	(United States) Fred Alexander (United States) Harold Hackett	(United States) Raymond Little (United States) Beals Wright	6–1, 7–5, 6–2
1909	(United States) Fred Alexander (United States) Harold Hackett	(United States) Maurice McLoughlin (United States) George Janes	6–4, 6–4, 6–0
1910	(United States) Fred Alexander (United States) Harold Hackett	(United States) Tom Bundy (United States) Trowbridge Hendrick	6–1, 8–6, 6–3
1911	(United States) Raymond Little (United States) Gus Touchard	(United States) Fred Alexander (United States) Harold Hackett	7–5, 13–15, 6–2, 6–4
1912	(United States) Maurice McLoughlin (United States) Tom Bundy	(United States) Raymond Little (United States) Gus Touchard	3–6, 6–2, 6–1, 7–5
1913	(United States) Maurice McLoughlin (United States) Tom Bundy	(United States) John Strachan (United States) Clarence Griffin	6–4, 7–5, 6–1
1914	(United States) Maurice McLoughlin (United States) Tom Bundy	(United States) George Church (United States) Dean Mathey	6–4, 6–2, 6–4
1915	(United States) Clarence Griffin (United States) Bill Johnston	(United States) Maurice McLoughlin (United States) Tom Bundy	2–6, 6–3, 6–4, 3–6, 6–3
1916	(United States) Clarence Griffin (United States) Bill Johnston	(United States) Maurice McLoughlin (United States) Ward Dawson	6–4, 6–3, 5–7, 6–3
1917	(United States) Fred Alexander (United States) Harold Throckmorton	(United States) Harry Johnson (United States) Irving Wright	11–9, 6–4, 6–4
1918	(United States) Vincent Richards (United States) Bill Tilden	(United States) Fred Alexander (United States) Beals Wright	6–3, 6–4, 3–6, 2–6, 6–2
1919	(Australia) Norman Brookes (Australia) Gerald Patterson	(United States) Vincent Richards (United States) Bill Tilden	8–6, 6–3, 4–6, 4–6, 6–2
1920	(United States) Clarence Griffin (United States) Bill Johnston	(United States) Willis E. Davis (United States) Roland Roberts	6–2, 6–2, 6–3
1921	(United States) Vincent Richards (United States) Bill Tilden	(United States) Watson Washburn (United States) R. Norris Williams	13–11, 12–10, 6–1
1922	(United States) Vincent Richards (United States) Bill Tilden	(Australia) Pat O'Hara Wood (Australia) Gerald Patterson	4–6, 6–1, 6–3, 6–4
1923	(South Africa) Brian Norton (United States) Bill Tilden	(United States) Watson Washburn (United States) R. Norris Williams	3–6, 6–2, 6–3, 5–7, 6–2
1924	(United States) Howard Kinsey (United States) Robert Kinsey	(Australia) Pat O'Hara Wood (Australia) Gerald Patterson	7–5, 5–7, 7–9, 6–3, 6–4
1925	(United States) Vincent Richards (United States) R. Norris Williams	(Australia) John Hawkes (Australia) Gerald Patterson	6–2, 8–10, 6–4, 11–9
1926	(United States) Vincent Richards (United States) R. Norris Williams	(United States) Alfred Chapin (United States) Bill Tilden	6–4, 6–8, 11–9, 6–3
1927	(United States) Frank Hunter (United States) Bill Tilden	(United States) Bill Johnston (United States) R. Norris Williams	10–8, 6–3, 6–3
1928	(United States) George Lott (United States) John F. Hennessey	(Australia) Gerald Patterson (Australia) John Hawkes	6–2, 6–1, 6–2
1929	(United States) George Lott (United States) John Doeg	(United States) Berkeley Bell (United States) Lewis White	10–8, 1–6, 6–4, 6–1
1930	(United States) George Lott (United States) John Doeg	(United States) Wilmer Allison (United States) John Van Ryn	8–6, 6–3, 3–6, 13–15, 6–4
1931	(United States) Wilmer Allison (United States) John Van Ryn	(United States) Gregory Mangin (United States) Berkeley Bell	6–4, 6–3, 6–2
1932	(United States) Ellsworth Vines (United States) Keith Gledhill	(United States) Wilmer Allison (United States) John Van Ryn	6–4, 6–3, 6–2
1933	(United States) George Lott (United States) Lester Stoefen	(United States) Frank Shields (United States) Frank Parker	11–13, 9–7, 9–7, 6–3
1934	(United States) George Lott (United States) Lester Stoefen	(United States) Wilmer Allison (United States) John Van Ryn	6–4, 9–7, 3–6, 6–4
1935	(United States) Wilmer Allison (United States) John Van Ryn	(United States) Don Budge (United States) Gene Mako	6–2, 6–3, 2–6, 3–6, 6–1
1936	(United States) Don Budge (United States) Gene Mako	(United States) Wilmer Allison (United States) John Van Ryn	6–4, 6–2, 6–4
1937	(Nazi Germany) Gottfried von Cramm (Nazi Germany) Henner Henkel	(United States) Don Budge (United States) Gene Mako	6–4, 7–5, 6–4
1938	(United States) Don Budge (United States) Gene Mako	(Australia) John Bromwich (Australia) Adrian Quist	6–3, 6–2, 6–1
1939	(Australia) John Bromwich (Australia) Adrian Quist	(Australia) John Crawford (Australia) Harry Hopman	8–6, 6–1, 6–4
1940	(United States) Jack Kramer (United States) Ted Schroeder	(United States) Gardnar Mulloy (United States) Henry Prusoff	6–4, 8–6, 9–7
1941	(United States) Jack Kramer (United States) Ted Schroeder	(United States) Gardnar Mulloy (United States) Wayne Sabin	9–7, 6–4, 6–2
1942	(United States) Gardnar Mulloy (United States) Bill Talbert	(United States) Ted Schroeder (United States) Sidney Wood	9–7, 7–5, 6–1
1943	(United States) Jack Kramer (United States) Frank Parker	(United States) David Freeman (United States) Bill Talbert	6–2, 6–4, 6–4
1944	(United States) Robert Falkenburg (United States) Don McNeill	(United States) Francisco Segura (United States) Bill Talbert	7–5, 6–4, 3–6, 6–1
1945	(United States) Gardnar Mulloy (United States) Bill Talbert	(United States) Robert Falkenburg (United States) Jack Tuero	12–10, 8–10, 12–10, 6–2
1946	(United States) Gardnar Mulloy (United States) Bill Talbert	(United States) Don McNeill (United States) Frank Guernsey	3–6, 6–4, 2–6, 6–3, 20–18
1947	(United States) Jack Kramer (United States) Ted Schroeder	(United States) William Talbert (Australia) Bill Sidwell	6–4, 7–5, 6–3
1948	(United States) Gardnar Mulloy (United States) Bill Talbert	(United States) Frank Parker (United States) Ted Schroeder	1–6, 9–7, 6–3, 3–6, 9–7
1949	(Australia) John Bromwich (Australia) Bill Sidwell	(Australia) Frank Sedgman (Australia) George Worthington	6–4, 6–0, 6–1
1950	(Australia) John Bromwich (Australia) Frank Sedgman	(United States) Gardnar Mulloy (United States) Bill Talbert	7–5, 8–6, 3–6, 6–1
1951	(Australia) Ken McGregor (Australia) Frank Sedgman	(Australia) Don Candy (Australia) Mervyn Rose	10–8, 6–4, 4–6, 7–5
1952	(Australia) Mervyn Rose (United States) Vic Seixas	(Australia) Ken McGregor (Australia) Frank Sedgman	3–6, 10–8, 10–8, 6–8, 8–6
1953	(Australia) Rex Hartwig (Australia) Mervyn Rose	(United States) Gardnar Mulloy (United States) Bill Talbert	6–4, 4–6, 6–2, 6–4
1954	(United States) Vic Seixas (United States) Tony Trabert	(Australia) Lew Hoad (Australia) Ken Rosewall	3–6, 6–4, 8–6, 6–3
1955	(Japan) Kosei Kamo (Japan) Atsushi Miyagi	(United States) Gerald Moss (United States) Bill Quillian	6–3, 6–3, 3–6, 1–6, 6–4
1956	(Australia) Lew Hoad (Australia) Ken Rosewall	(United States) Ham Richardson (United States) Vic Seixas	6–2, 6–2, 3–6, 6–4
1957	(Australia) Ashley Cooper (Australia) Neale Fraser	(United States) Gardnar Mulloy (United States) Budge Patty	4–6, 6–3, 9–7, 6–3
1958	(United States) Alex Olmedo (United States) Ham Richardson	(United States) Sam Giammalva (United States) Barry MacKay	3–6, 6–3, 6–4, 6–4
1959	(Australia) Roy Emerson (Australia) Neale Fraser	(United States) Alex Olmedo (United States) Earl Buchholz	3–6, 6–3, 5–7, 6–4, 7–5
1960	(Australia) Roy Emerson (Australia) Neale Fraser	(Australia) Rod Laver (Australia) Bob Mark	9–7, 6–2, 6–4
1961	(United States) Chuck McKinley (United States) Dennis Ralston	(Mexico) Rafael Osuna (Mexico) Antonio Palafox	6–3, 6–4, 2–6, 13–11
1962	(Mexico) Rafael Osuna (Mexico) Antonio Palafox	(United States) Chuck McKinley (United States) Dennis Ralston	6–4, 10–12, 1–6, 9–7, 6–3
1963	(United States) Chuck McKinley (United States) Dennis Ralston	(Mexico) Rafael Osuna (Mexico) Antonio Palafox	9–7, 4–6, 5–7, 6–3, 11–9
1964	(United States) Chuck McKinley (United States) Dennis Ralston	(United Kingdom) Mike Sangster (United Kingdom) Graham Stilwell	6–3, 6–2, 6–4
1965	(Australia) Roy Emerson (Australia) Fred Stolle	(United States) Frank Froehling (United States) Charles Pasarell	6–4, 10–12, 7–5, 7–3
1966	(Australia) Roy Emerson (Australia) Fred Stolle	(United States) Clark Graebner (United States) Dennis Ralston	6–4, 6–4, 6–4
1967	(Australia) John Newcombe (Australia) Tony Roche	(Australia) Bill Bowrey (Australia) Owen Davidson	6–8, 9–7, 6–3, 6–3

=== US Open ===
Year	Champions	Runners-up	Score
1968	(United States) Bob Lutz (United States) Stan Smith	(United States) Arthur Ashe (Spain) Andrés Gimeno	11–9, 6–1, 7–5
1969	(Australia) Ken Rosewall (Australia) Fred Stolle	(United States) Charles Pasarell (United States) Dennis Ralston	2–6, 7–5, 13–11, 6–3
1970	(France) Pierre Barthès (Socialist Federal Republic of Yugoslavia) Nikola Pilić	(Australia) Roy Emerson (Australia) Rod Laver	6–3, 7–6, 4–6, 7–6
1971	(Australia) John Newcombe (United Kingdom) Roger Taylor	(United States) Stan Smith (United States) Erik van Dillen	6–7, 6–3, 7–6, 4–6, [5-3]
1972	(South Africa) Cliff Drysdale (United Kingdom) Roger Taylor	(Australia) Owen Davidson (Australia) John Newcombe	6–4, 7–6, 6–3
1973	(Australia) Owen Davidson (Australia) John Newcombe	(Australia) Rod Laver (Australia) Kenneth Rosewall	7–5, 2–6, 7–5, 7–5
1974	(United States) Bob Lutz (United States) Stan Smith	(Chile) Patricio Cornejo (Chile) Jaime Fillol	6–3, 6–3
1975	(United States) Jimmy Connors (Romania) Ilie Năstase	(Netherlands) Tom Okker (United States) Marty Riessen	6–4, 7–6
1976	(Netherlands) Tom Okker (United States) Marty Riessen	(Australia) Paul Kronk (Australia) Cliff Letcher	6–4, 6–4
1977	(South Africa) Bob Hewitt (South Africa) Frew McMillan	(United States) Brian Gottfried (Mexico) Raúl Ramírez	6–4, 6–0
1978	(United States) Bob Lutz (United States) Stan Smith	(United States) Marty Riessen (United States) Sherwood Stewart	1–6, 7–5, 6–3
1979	(United States) Peter Fleming (United States) John McEnroe	(United States) Bob Lutz (United States) Stan Smith	6–2, 6–4
1980	(United States) Bob Lutz (United States) Stan Smith	(United States) Peter Fleming (United States) John McEnroe	7–6, 3–6, 6–1, 3–6, 6–3
1981	(United States) Peter Fleming (United States) John McEnroe	(Switzerland) Heinz Günthardt (Australia) Peter McNamara	Walkover
1982	(South Africa) Kevin Curren (United States) Steve Denton	(United States) Victor Amaya (United States) Hank Pfister	6–2, 6–7, 5–7, 6–2, 6–4
1983	(United States) Peter Fleming (United States) John McEnroe	(United States) Fritz Buehning (United States) Van Winitsky	6–3, 6–4, 6–2
1984	(Australia) John Fitzgerald (Czechoslovakia) Tomáš Šmíd	(Sweden) Stefan Edberg (Sweden) Anders Järryd	7–6, 6–3, 6–3
1985	(United States) Ken Flach (United States) Robert Seguso	(France) Henri Leconte (France) Yannick Noah	6–7, 7–6, 7–6, 6–0
1986	(Ecuador) Andrés Gómez (Socialist Federal Republic of Yugoslavia) Slobodan Živojinović	(Sweden) Joakim Nyström (Sweden) Mats Wilander	4–6, 6–3, 6–3, 4–6, 6–3
1987	(Sweden) Stefan Edberg (Sweden) Anders Järryd	(United States) Ken Flach (United States) Robert Seguso	7–6, 6–2, 4–6, 5–7, 7–6
1988	(Spain) Sergio Casal (Spain) Emilio Sánchez	(United States) Rick Leach (United States) Jim Pugh	Walkover
1989	(United States) John McEnroe (Australia) Mark Woodforde	(United States) Ken Flach (United States) Robert Seguso	6–4, 4–6, 6–3, 6–3
1990	(South Africa) Pieter Aldrich (South Africa) Danie Visser	(United States) Paul Annacone (United States) David Wheaton	6–2, 7–6, 6–2
1991	(Australia) John Fitzgerald (Sweden) Anders Järryd	(United States) Scott Davis (United States) David Pate	6–3, 3–6, 6–3, 6–3
1992	(United States) Jim Grabb (United States) Richey Reneberg	(United States) Rick Leach (United States) Kelly Jones	3–6, 7–6, 6–3, 6–3
1993	(United States) Ken Flach (United States) Rick Leach	(Czech Republic) Martin Damm (Czech Republic) Karel Nováček	6–7, 6–4, 6–2
1994	(Netherlands) Jacco Eltingh (Netherlands) Paul Haarhuis	(Australia) Todd Woodbridge (Australia) Mark Woodforde	6–3, 7–6
1995	(Australia) Todd Woodbridge (Australia) Mark Woodforde	(United States) Alex O'Brien (Australia) Sandon Stolle	6–3, 6–3
1996	(Australia) Todd Woodbridge (Australia) Mark Woodforde	(Netherlands) Jacco Eltingh (Netherlands) Paul Haarhuis	4–6, 7–6, 7–6
1997	(Russia) Yevgeny Kafelnikov (Czech Republic) Daniel Vacek	(Sweden) Jonas Björkman (Sweden) Nicklas Kulti	7–6, 6–3
1998	(Australia) Sandon Stolle (Czech Republic) Cyril Suk	(The Bahamas) Mark Knowles (Canada) Daniel Nestor	4–6, 7–6, 2–6
1999	(Canada) Sébastien Lareau (United States) Alex O'Brien	(India) Mahesh Bhupathi (India) Leander Paes	7–6, 6–4
2000	(Australia) Lleyton Hewitt (Belarus) Max Mirnyi	(South Africa) Ellis Ferreira (United States) Rick Leach	6–4, 5–7, 7–6
2001	(Zimbabwe) Wayne Black (Zimbabwe) Kevin Ullyett	(United States) Donald Johnson (United States) Jared Palmer	7–6, 2–6, 6–3
2002	(India) Mahesh Bhupathi (Belarus) Max Mirnyi	(Czech Republic) Jiří Novák (Czech Republic) Radek Štěpánek	6–3, 3–6, 6–4
2003	(Sweden) Jonas Björkman (Australia) Todd Woodbridge	(United States) Bob Bryan (United States) Mike Bryan	5–7, 6–0, 7–5
2004	(The Bahamas) Mark Knowles (Canada) Daniel Nestor	(India) Leander Paes (Czech Republic) David Rikl	6–3, 6–3
2005	(United States) Bob Bryan (United States) Mike Bryan	(Sweden) Jonas Björkman (Belarus) Max Mirnyi	6–1, 6–4
2006	(Czech Republic) Martin Damm (India) Leander Paes	(Sweden) Jonas Björkman (Belarus) Max Mirnyi	6–7^{(5–7)}, 6–4, 6–3
2007	(Sweden) Simon Aspelin (Austria) Julian Knowle	(Czech Republic) Lukáš Dlouhý (Czech Republic) Pavel Vízner	7–5, 6–4
2008	(United States) Bob Bryan (United States) Mike Bryan	(Czech Republic) Lukáš Dlouhý (India) Leander Paes	7–6^{(7–5)}, 7–6^{(12–10)}
2009	(Czech Republic) Lukáš Dlouhý (India) Leander Paes	(India) Mahesh Bhupathi (The Bahamas) Mark Knowles	3–6, 6–3, 6–2
2010	(United States) Bob Bryan (United States) Mike Bryan	(India) Rohan Bopanna (Pakistan) Aisam-ul-Haq Qureshi	7–6^{(7–5)}, 7–6^{(7–4)}
2011	(Austria) Jürgen Melzer (Germany) Philipp Petzschner	(Poland) Mariusz Fyrstenberg (Poland) Marcin Matkowski	6–2, 6–2
2012	(United States) Bob Bryan (United States) Mike Bryan	(India) Leander Paes (Czech Republic) Radek Štěpánek	6–3, 6–4
2013	(India) Leander Paes (Czech Republic) Radek Štěpánek	(Austria) Alexander Peya (Brazil) Bruno Soares	6–1, 6–3
2014	(United States) Bob Bryan (United States) Mike Bryan	(Spain) Marcel Granollers (Spain) Marc López	6–3, 6–4
2015	(France) Pierre-Hugues Herbert (France) Nicolas Mahut	(United Kingdom) Jamie Murray (Australia) John Peers	6–4, 6–4
2016	(United Kingdom) Jamie Murray (Brazil) Bruno Soares	(Spain) Pablo Carreño Busta (Spain) Guillermo García-López	6–2, 6–3
2017	(Netherlands) Jean-Julien Rojer (Romania) Horia Tecău	(Spain) Feliciano López (Spain) Marc López	6–4, 6–3
2018	(United States) Mike Bryan (United States) Jack Sock	(Poland) Łukasz Kubot (Brazil) Marcelo Melo	6–3, 6–1
2019	(Colombia) Juan Sebastián Cabal (Colombia) Robert Farah	(Spain) Marcel Granollers (Argentina) Horacio Zeballos	6–4, 7–5
2020	(Croatia) Mate Pavić (Brazil) Bruno Soares	(Netherlands) Wesley Koolhof (Croatia) Nikola Mektić	7–5, 6–3
2021	(United States) Rajeev Ram (United Kingdom) Joe Salisbury	(United Kingdom) Jamie Murray (Brazil) Bruno Soares	3–6, 6–2, 6–2
2022	(United States) Rajeev Ram (United Kingdom) Joe Salisbury	(Netherlands) Wesley Koolhof (United Kingdom) Neal Skupski	7–6^{(7–4)}, 7–5
2023	(United States) Rajeev Ram (United Kingdom) Joe Salisbury	(India) Rohan Bopanna (Australia) Matthew Ebden	2–6, 6–3, 6–4
2024	(Australia) Max Purcell (Australia) Jordan Thompson	(Germany) Kevin Krawietz (Germany) Tim Pütz	6–4, 7–6^{(7–4)}
2025	(Spain) Marcel Granollers (Argentina) Horacio Zeballos	(United Kingdom) Joe Salisbury (United Kingdom) Neal Skupski	3–6, 7–6^{(7–5)}, 7–5
2026	(United States) Christian Harrison (United Kingdom) Neal Skupski	(Germany) Kevin Krawietz (Germany) Tim Pütz	6–4, 7–6^{(8–6)}

== Statistics ==
=== Multiple champions ===
Player	Amateur Era	Open Era	All-time	Years
Richard Sears (USA)	6	0	6	1882, 1883, 1884, 1885, 1886, 1887
Holcombe Ward (USA)	6	0	6	1899, 1900, 1901, 1904, 1905, 1906
Mike Bryan (USA)	0	6	6	2005, 2008, 2010, 2012, 2014, 2018
James Dwight (USA)	5	0	5	1882, 1883, 1884, 1886, 1887
Fred Alexander (USA)	5	0	5	1907, 1908, 1909, 1910, 1917
Bill Tilden (USA)	5	0	5	1918, 1921, 1922, 1923, 1927
Vincent Richards (USA)	5	0	5	1918, 1921, 1922, 1925, 1926
George Lott (USA)	5	0	5	1928, 1929, 1930, 1933, 1934
Bob Bryan (USA)	0	5	5	2005, 2008, 2010, 2012, 2014
Harold Hackett (USA)	4	0	4	1907, 1908, 1909, 1910
Jack Kramer (USA)	4	0	4	1940, 1941, 1943, 1947
Gardnar Mulloy (USA)	4	0	4	1942, 1945, 1946, 1948
Bill Talbert (USA)	4	0	4	1942, 1945, 1946, 1948
Roy Emerson (AUS)	4	0	4	1959, 1960 1965, 1966
Bob Lutz (USA)	0	4	4	1968, 1974, 1978, 1980
Stan Smith (USA)	0	4	4	1968, 1974, 1978, 1980
John McEnroe (USA)	0	4	4	1979, 1981, 1983, 1989
Oliver Campbell (USA)	3	0	3	1888, 1891, 1892
Clarence Hobart (USA)	3	0	3	1890, 1893, 1894
Beals Wright (USA)	3	0	3	1904, 1905, 1906
Maurice McLoughlin (USA)	3	0	3	1912, 1913, 1914
Tom Bundy (USA)	3	0	3	1912, 1913, 1914
Clarence Griffin (USA)	3	0	3	1915, 1916, 1920
Ted Schroeder (USA)	3	0	3	1940, 1941, 1947
Neale Fraser (AUS)	3	0	3	1957, 1959, 1960
Chuck McKinley (USA)	3	0	3	1961, 1963, 1964
Dennis Ralston (USA)	3	0	3	1961, 1963, 1964
Fred Stolle (AUS)	2	1	3	1965, 1966, 1968
John Newcombe (AUS)	1	2	3	1967, 1971, 1973
Peter Fleming (USA)	0	3	3	1979, 1981, 1983
Mark Woodforde (AUS)	0	3	3	1989, 1995, 1996
Todd Woodbridge (AUS)	0	3	3	1995, 1996, 2003
Leander Paes (IND)	0	3	3	2006, 2009, 2013
Rajeev Ram (USA)	0	3	3	2021, 2022, 2023
Joe Salisbury (GBR)	0	3	3	2021, 2022, 2023

== See also ==
U.S. Open other competitions

- List of US Open men's singles champions
- List of US Open women's singles champions
- List of US Open women's doubles champions
- List of US Open mixed doubles champions

Grand Slam men's doubles

- List of Australian Open men's doubles champions
- List of French Open men's doubles champions
- List of Wimbledon gentlemen's doubles champions
- List of Grand Slam men's doubles champions
