= 1884 U.S. National Championships – Doubles =

Doubles
- 1884 U.S. National Championships

Final
- Champion: (United States) James Dwight (United States) Richard Sears
- Runner-up: (United States) Alexander Van Rensselaer (United States) Walter Berry
- Score: 6–4, 6–1, 8–10, 6–4

Events
Singles	Doubles
← 1883 ·	U.S. National Championships	· 1885 →

James Dwight and Richard Sears defended their title against Alexander Van Rensselaer and Walter Berry in the final.

== Draw ==
=== Finals ===
Semifinals
(United States) A Van Rensselaer (United States) W Berry	6	6
(United States) GM Brinley (United States) R Stevens	1	2
(United States) C Clark (United States) J Clark	1	6	1
(United States) J Dwight (United States) R Sears	6	1	6

Final
(United States) A Van Rensselaer (United States) W Berry	4	1	10	4
(United States) J Dwight (United States) R Sears	6	6	8	6

=== Earlier rounds ===
==== Section 1 ====
First round
(United States) Keene (United States) J Tooker
bye
(United States) RL Beeckman (United States) Partner
bye
(United States) A Van Rensselaer (United States) W Berry
bye
(United States) ES Butler (United States) H Taylor
bye
(United States) M Fielding (United States) EE Denniston
bye
–
–
(United States) GM Brinley (United States) R Stevens
bye
(United States) G Richards (United States) H Slocum	w/	o
(United States) H Taylor (United States) P. Willis

Second round
(United States) Keene (United States) J Tooker	4	6	6
(United States) RL Beeckman (United States) Partner	6	5	2
(United States) A Van Rensselaer (United States) W Berry	6	6
(United States) ES Butler (United States) H Taylor	4	1
(United States) M Fielding (United States) EE Denniston
bye
(United States) GM Brinley (United States) R Stevens	6	3	6
(United States) G Richards (United States) H Slocum	3	6	4

Quarterfinals
(United States) Keene (United States) J Tooker	1	2
(United States) A Van Rensselaer (United States) W Berry	6	6
(United States) M Fielding (United States) EE Denniston	4	3
(United States) GM Brinley (United States) R Stevens	8	6

Semifinals
(United States) A Van Rensselaer (United States) W Berry	6	6
(United States) GM Brinley (United States) R Stevens	1	2

==== Section 2 ====
First round
(United States) C Clark (United States) J Clark	6	6
(United States) S Shaw (United States) JH Powell	3	1
(United States) Brinn (United States) WB Merriman
bye
(United States) WVS Thorne (United States) P Knapp
bye
(United States) P. Willis (United States) P Lyman
bye
(United States) J Dwight (United States) R Sears
bye
(United States) SH Hooper (United States) EH Gillette
bye
(United States) RF Conover (United States) WH Barnes
bye
(United States) MS Paton (United States) Munn
bye

Second round
(United States) C Clark (United States) J Clark	6	6
(United States) Brinn (United States) WB Merriman	2	2
(United States) WVS Thorne (United States) P Knapp	6	6
(United States) P. Willis (United States) P Lyman	3	2
(United States) J Dwight (United States) R Sears	6	6
(United States) SH Hooper (United States) EH Gillette	0	2
(United States) RF Conover (United States) WH Barnes	w/	o
(United States) MS Paton (United States) Munn

Quarterfinals
(United States) C Clark (United States) J Clark	3	6	6
(United States) WVS Thorne (United States) P Knapp	6	2	2
(United States) J Dwight (United States) R Sears	6	6
(United States) RF Conover (United States) WH Barnes	0	2

Semifinals
(United States) C Clark (United States) J Clark	1	6	1
(United States) J Dwight (United States) R Sears	6	1	6
