= 1884 U.S. National Championships – Singles =

Singles
- 1884 U.S. National Championships

Final
- Champion: (United States) Richard Sears
- Runner-up: (United States) Howard Taylor
- Score: 6–0, 1–6, 6–0, 6–2

Details
- Draw: 35

Events
Singles	Doubles
← 1883 ·	U.S. National Championships	· 1885 →

Three-time defending champion Richard Sears defeated Howard Taylor in the challenge round, 6–0, 1–6, 6–0, 6–2 to win the men's singles tennis title at the 1884 U.S. National Championships. A challenge round was introduced this year, which was played until 1911. Arthur Rives became the first player to play at more than one Grand Slam singles tournament within a calendar year.

== Draw ==
=== Challenge round ===
Challenge round
(United States) Richard Sears	6	1	6	6
(United States) Howard Taylor	0	6	0	2

=== Finals ===
Semifinals
(United States) Percy Knapp	2	6	1
(United States) Howard Taylor	6	2	6
(United States) William VS Thorne	2	6	6
(United States) Clarence Clark	6	2	3

Finals
(United States) Howard Taylor	6	4	6	6
(United States) William VS Thorne	4	6	1	4

=== Earlier rounds ===
==== Section 1 ====
First round
(United States) RL Beeckman	6	6
(United States) MG Post	3	2

Second round
(United States) RL Beeckman	6	6
(United States) SH Hooper	5	4
(United States) P Willis	6	6
(United States) A Rives	3	3
(United States) P Knapp	6	6
(United States) FH Gillette	4	2
(United States) WB Eaton	w/	o
(United States) J Dwight

Third round
(United States) RL Beeckman	1	6	6
(United States) P Willis	6	5	2
(United States) P Knapp	6	6
(United States) WB Eaton	1	1

Quarterfinals
(United States) RL Beeckman	1	2
(United States) P Knapp	6	6

==== Section 2 ====
First round
(United States) GM Brinley	6	6
(United States) WB Merriman	5	1

Second round
(United States) H Taylor	6	6
(United States) GM Brinley	1	1
(United States) J Clark	6	6
(United States) WF Metcalfe	2	0
(United States) A Van Rensselaer	6	6
(United States) WH Barnes	5	1
(United States) RF Conover	6	6
(United States) F Keene	2	2

Third round
(United States) H Taylor	3	6	7
(United States) J Clark	6	2	5
(United States) A Van Rensselaer	6	2	6
(United States) RF Conover	4	6	3

Quarterfinals
(United States) H Taylor	6	6
(United States) A Van Rensselaer	4	1

==== Section 3 ====
First round
(United States) W Thorne	6	6
(United States) F Warren	0	1

Second round
(United States) W Thorne	0	6	6
(United States) MS Paton	6	5	4
(United States) H Slocum	4	6	6
(United States) FJ Hynes	6	2	3
(United States) G Richards	w/	o
(United States) AM Wood
(United States) EK Butler	6	6
(United States) W Berry	2	1

Third round
(United States) W Thorne	w/	o
(United States) H Slocum
(United States) G Richards	4	6	6
(United States) EK Butler	6	5	4

Quarterfinals
(United States) W Thorne	w/	o
(United States) G Richards

==== Section 4 ====
First round

Second round
(United States) C Clark	6	6
(United States) A Curtis	3	4
(United States) PR Lyman	6	6
(United States) N Perry E Hallowell	3	3
(United States) AC Salt	6	6
(United States) EE Denniston	5	1
(United States) M Fielding	6	6
(United States) W Gammell	1	4

Third round
(United States) C Clark	6	6
(United States) PR Lyman	4	1
(United States) AC Salt	6	6
(United States) M Fielding	4	1

Quarterfinals
(United States) C Clark	6	6
(United States) AC Salt	2	2

Preceded by 1883 U.S. National Championships – Singles	Grand Slam men's singles	Succeeded by 1885 U.S. National Championships – Singles
