= 1886 U.S. National Championships – Doubles =

Doubles
- 1886 U.S. National Championships

Final
- Champion: (United States) Richard Sears (United States) James Dwight
- Runner-up: (United States) Howard Taylor (United States) Godfrey M. Brinley
- Score: 7–5, 6–8, (Note: Collins has the score 5–7.) 7–5, 6–4

Events
Singles	Doubles
← 1885 ·	U.S. National Championships	· 1887 →

Sears and Dwight won the doubles title by beating Taylor and Brinley in four sets in the final. The final was played on August 26, 1886.

== Draw ==
First round
(United States) R Sears (United States) J Dwight
bye
(United States) FS Mansfield (United States) SH Hooper	6	6	3	4	6
(United States) R Barnes (United States) O Campbell	2	3	6	6	3
(United States) J Clark (United States) W Berry	6	6	4	0	8
(United States) ST Chase (United States) QA Shaw	4	2	6	6	6
(United States) H Taylor (United States) W Lewis	6	6	6
R Gamble (United States) Mackenzie	4	5	1
(United States) M Fielding; D'Invilliers	5	6	3	6
(United States) J Tooker (United States) A Rives	6	5	6	3
(United States) RL Beeckman (United States) H Slocum	6	6	6
(United States) C Nightingale (United States) GA Smith	0	1	5
(United States) H Taylor (United States) GM Brinley
bye
(United States) HM Sears (United States) PS Sears	w/	o
Robbins; Robbins

Second round
(United States) R Sears (United States) J Dwight	6	6	6
(United States) FS Mansfield (United States) SH Hooper	2	1	0
(United States) J Clark (United States) W Berry	w/	o
(United States) H Taylor (United States) W Lewis
(United States) M Fielding; D'Invilliers
(United States) RL Beeckman (United States) H Slocum	w/	o
(United States) H Taylor (United States) GM Brinley	6	6	6
(United States) HM Sears (United States) PS Sears	1	4	4

Semifinals
(United States) R Sears (United States) J Dwight	6	6	5	6
(United States) J Clark (United States) W Berry	5	4	6	3
(United States) RL Beeckman (United States) H Slocum	3	4	6	6	8
(United States) H Taylor (United States) GM Brinley	6	6	0	1	10

Final
(United States) R Sears (United States) J Dwight	7	6	7	6
(United States) H Taylor (United States) GM Brinley	5	8	5	4
