= 1885 U.S. National Championships – Doubles =

Doubles
- 1885 U.S. National Championships

Final
- Champion: (United States) Richard Sears (United States) Joseph Clark
- Runner-up: (United States) Henry Slocum (United States) Percy Knapp
- Score: 6–3, 6–0, 6–2

Events
Singles	Doubles
← 1884 ·	U.S. National Championships	· 1886 →

Richard Sears and Joseph Clark won the final against Henry Slocum and Percy Knapp.

== Draw ==
Second round
(United States) H Slocum (United States) P Knapp
bye
(United States) H Taylor (United States) RL Beeckman	4	6	6
(United States) SH Hooper (United States) FS Mansfield	6	3	4
(United States) A Moffat (United States) CB Davis	6	6
(United States) HS Morgan (United States) Miller	2	1
(United States) M Fielding (United States) Corse
bye

Semifinals
(United States) H Slocum (United States) P Knapp	6	4	6
(United States) H Taylor (United States) RL Beeckman	3	6	4
(United States) A Moffat (United States) CB Davis	6	1	6
(United States) M Fielding (United States) Corse	3	6	3

Final
(United States) H Slocum (United States) P Knapp	8	7
(United States) A Moffat (United States) CB Davis	6	5
Final
(United States) R Sears (United States) J Clark	6	6	2
(United States) P Presbry (United States) EH Gillette	2	4
