= 1885 U.S. National Championships – Singles =

Singles
- 1885 U.S. National Championships

Final
- Champion: (United States) Richard Sears
- Runner-up: (United States) Godfrey M. Brinley
- Score: 6–3, 4–6, 6–0, 6–3

Details
- Draw: 26

Events
| Singles | Doubles |
| ← 1884 · | U.S. National Championships | · 1886 → |

Four-time defending champion Richard Sears defeated Godfrey M. Brinley in the challenge round, 6–3, 4–6, 6–0, 6–3 to win the men's singles tennis title at the 1885 U.S. National Championships. It was Sears' fifth title at the U.S. championships.

Following the completion of the Challenge Round match, an exhibition-type lawn tennis match took place between Sears and the reigning world champion in court tennis Tom Pettitt (who was also the court tennis and lawn tennis pro at the Newport Casino).

== Draw ==
=== Challenge round ===
| Challenge round |
| (United States) Richard Sears | 6 | 4 | 6 | 6 |
| (United States) Godfrey M Brinley | 3 | 6 | 0 | 3 |

=== Finals ===
Semifinals
(United States) Joseph Clark | 4 | 3
(United States) Percy Knapp | 6 | 6
(United States) Godfrey M Brinley | 3 | 9 | 6
(United States) Walter Berry | 6 | 7 | 1

Finals
(United States) Percy Knapp | 3 | 3 | 6 | 4
(United States) Godfrey M Brinley | 6 | 6 | 3 | 6

=== Earlier rounds ===
==== Section 1 ====
First round
(United States) RL Beeckman | 6 | 6
(United States) GA Smith | 1 | 2
(United States) FS Mansfield | 6 | 6
(United States) CE Garrett | 3 | 3
(United States) P Knapp | 6 | 7
(United States) W Shippen | 1 | 5
(United States) SH Hooper | 9 | 6
(United States) FJ Hynes | 7 | 2
(United States) C Nightingale | 6 | 4 | 7
(United States) HS Morgan | 3 | 6 | 5

Second round
(United States) J Clark | 6 | 1 | 8
(United States) RL Beeckman | 2 | 6 | 6
(United States) A Moffat | 6 | 9 | 6
(United States) FS Mansfield | 0 | 11 | 3
(United States) P Knapp | 6 | 6
(United States) SH Hooper | 0 | 2
(United States) H Taylor | 6 | 6
(United States) C Nightingale | 4 | 2

Quarterfinals
(United States) J Clark | 7 | 1 | 6
(United States) A Moffat | 5 | 6 | 3
(United States) P Knapp | 4 | 10 | 6
(United States) H Taylor | 6 | 8 | 2

Semifinals
(United States) J Clark | 4 | 3
(United States) P Knapp | 6 | 6

==== Section 2 ====
First round
(United States) CB Davis | 6 | 7
(United States) P Presbry | 3 | 5
(United States) H Lilienthal | w/ | o
(United States) C Clark
(United States) W Berry | 6 | 6
(United States) MA Howe | 3 | 1
(United States) F Warren | 3 | 6 | 7
(United States) W Lewis | 6 | 3 | 5
(United States) F Keene | 9 | 6
(United States) EH Gillette | 7 | 2

Second round
(United States) GM Brinley | 6 | 4 | 6
(United States) H Slocum | 1 | 6 | 2
(United States) CB Davis | 6 | 6
(United States) H Lilienthal | 1 | 0
(United States) W Berry | 6 | 2 | 6
(United States) F Warren | 3 | 6 | 3
(United States) F Keene | w/ | o
(United States) MS Paton

Quarterfinals
(United States) GM Brinley | 6 | 6
(United States) CB Davis | 2 | 1
(United States) W Berry | 6 | 6
(United States) F Keene | 2 | 1

Semifinals
(United States) GM Brinley | 3 | 9 | 6
(United States) W Berry | 6 | 7 | 1

| Preceded by 1884 U.S. National Championships – Singles | Grand Slam men's singles | Succeeded by 1886 U.S. National Championships – Singles |
