= 1886 U.S. National Championships – Singles =

Singles
- 1886 U.S. National Championships

Final
- Champion: (United States) Richard Sears
- Runner-up: (United States) Robert Livingston Beeckman
- Score: 4–6, 6–1, 6–3, 6–4

Details
- Draw: 32

Events
Singles	Doubles
← 1885 ·	U.S. National Championships	· 1887 →

Five-time defending champion Richard Sears defeated Robert Livingston Beeckman in the challenge round, 4–6, 6–1, 6–3, 6–4 to win the men's singles tennis title at the 1886 U.S. National Championships. For the first time, all matches were played as best of five sets.

== Draw ==
=== Challenge round ===
Challenge round
(United States) Richard Sears	4	6	6	6
(United States) Robert L Beeckman	6	1	3	4

=== Finals ===
Semifinals
(United States) Joseph Clark	5	2	3
(United States) Howard Taylor	6	6	6
(United States) Robert L Beeckman	6	6	6
(United States) Charles A Chase	4	0	2

Finals
(United States) Howard Taylor	6	3	4	2
(United States) Robert L Beeckman	2	6	6	6

=== Earlier rounds ===
==== Section 1 ====
First round
(United States) P Presbry	6	6	6
R Gamble	3	1	5

Second round
(United States) GM Brinley	6	3	6	6
(United States) P Presbry	2	6	2	4
(United States) J Clark	6	6	6
(United States) Edgar	0	1	1
(United States) H Slocum	4	6	6	6
(United States) O Campbell	6	1	3	1
(United States) PS Sears	5	4	6	6	6
(United States) WR Weeden	6	6	1	0	3

Third round
(United States) GM Brinley	0	4	3
(United States) J Clark	6	6	6
(United States) H Slocum	6	4	6	4
(United States) PS Sears	2	6	2	6

Quarterfinals
(United States) J Clark	1	6	6	6
(United States) H Slocum	6	5	5	2

==== Section 2 ====
First round
(United States) GA Smith	2	6	6	6
(United States) WH Barnes	6	3	4	4

Second round
(United States) H Taylor	0	3	6	6	13
(United States) J Dwight	6	6	1	2	11
(United States) MS Paton	1	1	0
(United States) GA Smith	6	6	6

Third round
(United States) H Taylor	6	6	6
(United States) W Berry	0	0	1
(United States) QA Shaw	6	6	4	6
(United States) GA Smith	0	1	6	1

Quarterfinals
(United States) H Taylor	6	6	6
(United States) QA Shaw	3	5	5

==== Section 3 ====
First round

Second round
(United States) E.A. Manice	0	0	1
(United States) RL Beeckman	6	6	6
(United States) Miller	6	3	3	6	6
(United States) HM Sears	2	6	6	5	7
(United States) C Nightingale	1	0	0
(United States) FS Mansfield	6	6	6
(United States) W Lewis	2	2	3
(United States) M Fielding	6	6	6

Third round
(United States) RL Beeckman	6	6	6
(United States) HM Sears	2	0	0
(United States) FS Mansfield	6	6	6
(United States) M Fielding	4	1	3

Quarterfinals
(United States) RL Beeckman	6	3	6	6
(United States) FS Mansfield	4	6	0	3

==== Section 4 ====
First round

Second round
(United States) SH Hooper	0	3	0
(United States) CA Chase	6	6	6
(United States) A Rives
(United States) Robbins	w/	o
(United States) D'Invilliers
(United States) M Post	w/	o
(United States) F Warren	7	2	6	6	6
(United States) FW Taylor	9	6	3	0	4

Third round
(United States) CA Chase	6	6	6
(United States) Robbins	5	3	2
(United States) M Post	6	6	3	2	6
(United States) F Warren	2	4	6	6	2

Quarterfinals
(United States) CA Chase	6	6	6
(United States) M Post	0	2	4

Preceded by 1885 Wimbledon Championships – Men's singles	Grand Slam men's singles	Succeeded by 1886 Wimbledon Championships – Men's singles
