= 1887 U.S. National Championships – Men's singles =

Men's singles
- 1887 U.S. National Championships

Final
- Champion: (United States) Richard Sears
- Runner-up: (United States) Henry Slocum
- Score: 6–1, 6–3, 6–2

Events
Singles	men	women
Doubles	men	women
← 1886 ·	U.S. National Championships	· 1888 →

Six-time defending champion Richard Sears defeated Henry Slocum in the challenge round, 6–1, 6–3, 6–2 to win the men's singles tennis title at the 1887 U.S. National Championships.

== Draw ==
=== Challenge round ===
Challenge round
(United States) Richard Sears	6	6	6
(United States) Henry Slocum	1	3	2

=== Finals ===
Semifinals
(United States) Joseph Clark	8	4	3	3
(United States) Henry Slocum	6	6	6	6
(United States) Howard Taylor	6	6	6
(United States) William Thacher	3	1	1

Finals
(United States) Henry Slocum	12	7	6
(United States) Howard Taylor	10	5	4

=== Earlier rounds ===
==== Section 1 ====
First round
(United States) T Coulter	w/	o
(United States) WR Weeden
(United States) QA Shaw	w/	o
(United States) A Empie Wright
(United States) GR Fearing	6	6	6
(United States) W Lewis	4	4	0
(United States) CE Garrett	6	6	6
(United States) P Manchester	0	2	0
(United States) RL Beeckman	6	6	6
(United States) M Fielding	4	4	0

Second round
(United States) FS Mansfield	6	8	6
(United States) T Coulter	2	6	1
(United States) J Clark	8	6	8
(United States) QA Shaw	6	3	6
(United States) GR Fearing	8	3	6	6
(United States) CE Garrett	6	6	4	1
(United States) H Slocum	6	4	8	6
(United States) RL Beeckman	2	6	6	3

Quarterfinals
(United States) FS Mansfield	6	2	8	1	4
(United States) J Clark	3	6	6	6	6
(United States) GR Fearing	1	5	2
(United States) H Slocum	6	7	6

Semifinals
(United States) J Clark	8	4	3	3
(United States) H Slocum	6	6	6	6

==== Section 2 ====
First round
(United States) H Taylor	6	6	7
(United States) O Campbell	3	2	5
(United States) NH Emmons	6	6	6
(United States) WH Barnes	1	4	1
(United States) WL Thacher	12	5	6	6
(United States) W Cushman	10	7	1	3

Second round
(United States) H Taylor	6	6	6
(United States) G Depew	1	4	3
(United States) PS Sears	6	6	6
(United States) F Warren	3	2	0
(United States) GM Brinley	6	6	6
(United States) NH Emmons	4	1	2
(United States) WL Thacher	6	9	6
(United States) FW Taylor	3	7	3

Quarterfinals
(United States) H Taylor	6	1	6	6
(United States) PS Sears	1	6	3	1
(United States) GM Brinley	4	6	6	4
(United States) WL Thacher	6	8	3	6

Semifinals
(United States) H Taylor	6	6	6
(United States) WL Thacher	3	1	1

Preceded by 1886 Wimbledon Championships – Men's Singles	Grand Slam men's singles	Succeeded by 1887 Wimbledon Championships – Men's singles
