= Brookfield Isle of Wight Open =

Defunct tennis tournament
- Founded: 1884; 141 years ago
- Abolished: 1886; 139 years ago
- Location: Brookfield, Ryde, Isle of Wight, England
- Surface: Grass

The Brookfield Isle of Wight Open was a late Victorian era men's tennis tournament founded in August 1884. It was first staged at Brookfield, Ryde, Isle of Wight, England and ran through until 1886 when it was abolished.

== History ==
The Brookfield Isle of Wight Open was a men's and women's grass court tennis tournament founded in August 1884. The tournament was held through to 1886 when it was abolished. In August 1883 American player James Dwight had lost in the final of the U.S. National Championships shortly afterward he departed with Richard Sears for Europe. Both players competed at events in England during 1883, 1884 and into 1885. The gentleman's singles competition was won twice in succession by James Dwight.
