= 1887 U.S. National Championships – Men's doubles =

Men's doubles
- 1887 U.S. National Championships

Final
- Champion: (United States) Richard Sears (United States) James Dwight
- Runner-up: (United States) Howard Taylor (United States) Henry Slocum
- Score: 6–4, 3–6, 2–6, 6–3, 6–3

Events
Singles	men	women
Doubles	men	women
← 1886 ·	U.S. National Championships	· 1888 →

In the final, Sears and Dwight won in five sets against Taylor and Slocum.

== Draw ==
First round
(United States) R Sears (United States) J Dwight	6	10	4	8
(United States) CJ Post (United States) SV Coffin	2	8	6	6
(United States) SM Colgate (United States) WA Brown	7	6	6
(United States) FM Carryl (United States) CF Watson	5	2	0
(United States) QA Shaw (United States) TS Tailer	6	6	4	6
(United States) A Empie Wright (United States) M Wright	1	2	6	2
(United States) H Taylor (United States) H Slocum	4	11	6	6
(United States) O Campbell (United States) A Duryee	6	9	2	4

Semifinals
(United States) R Sears (United States) J Dwight	6	6	8
(United States) SM Colgate (United States) WA Brown	1	1	6
(United States) QA Shaw (United States) TS Tailer	3	4	6	2
(United States) H Taylor (United States) H Slocum	6	6	1	6

Final
(United States) R Sears (United States) J Dwight	6	3	2	6	6
(United States) H Taylor (United States) H Slocum	4	6	6	3	3
