= 1885 U.S. National Championships (tennis) =

- Date: August 18–22
- Edition: 5th
- Surface: Grass
- Location: Newport, Rhode Island, U.S.
- Venue: Newport Casino

Champions

Singles
- (United States) Richard D. Sears

Doubles
- (United States) Richard D. Sears / (United States) Joseph Clark
- U.S. National Championships

The 1885 U.S. National Championships (now known as the US Open) was a tennis tournament that took place on the outdoor grass courts at the Newport Casino in Newport, Rhode Island. The tournament was held from August 18 to August 22. It was the 5th U.S. National Championships and the second Grand Slam tournament of the year.

Following the completion of the Challenge Round singles match, an exhibition-type lawn tennis match took place between Dick Sears and the reigning world champion in court tennis Tom Pettitt (who was also the court tennis and lawn tennis pro at the Newport Casino).

== Finals ==
=== Singles ===
(United States) Richard D. Sears defeated (United States) Godfrey M. Brinley 6–3, 4–6, 6–0, 6–3

=== Doubles ===
(United States) Richard D. Sears / (United States) Joseph Clark def. (United States) Henry Slocum / (United States) Percy Knapp 6–3, 6–0, 6–2

| Preceded by 1885 Wimbledon Championships | Grand Slams | Succeeded by 1886 Wimbledon Championships |
