= William V.S. Thorne =

American tennis player

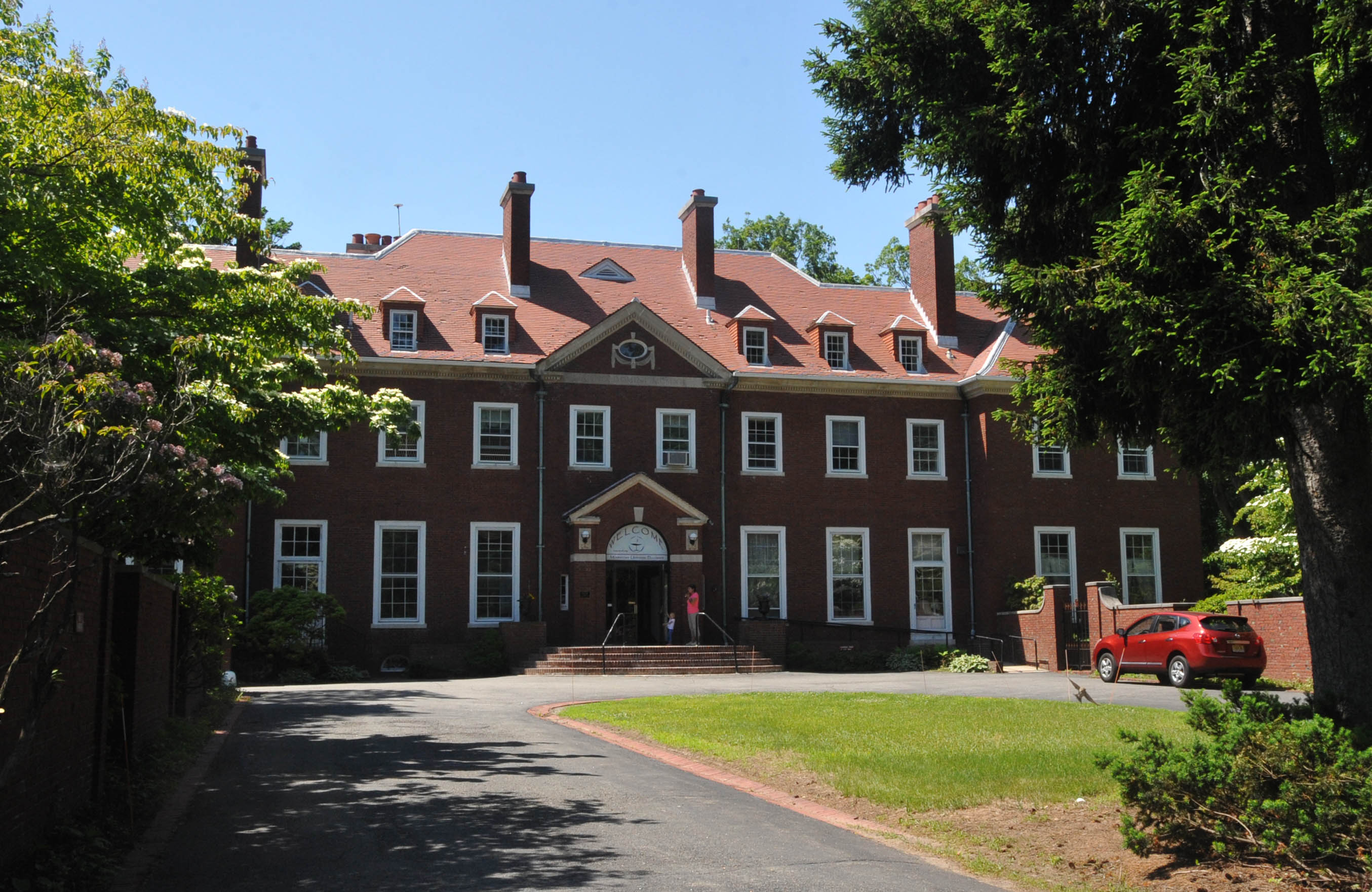
- Thorne Mansion in Morris Township, NJ
- Full name: William Van Schoonhoven Thorne
- Country (sports): United States
- Born: March 22, 1865 Millbrook, Dutchess County, New York, United States
- Died: February 6, 1920 (aged 54) Manhattan, New York, United States
- Turned pro: 1884 (amateur tour)
- Retired: 1888

Singles

Grand Slam singles results
- US Open: F (1884)

Doubles

Grand Slam doubles results
- US Open: QF (1882, 1884)

William V.S. Thorne (March 22, 1865 – February 6, 1920) was an American financier in the railroad and hospital purchasing industries. He was also a tennis player active in the late 19th century US Open.

== Early life and education ==
Thorne was born in Dutchess County, New York, the second of five children to Samuel Thorne and Phebe Van Schoonhoven. His father was president of the Pennsylvania Coal Company, and a director of the Central Trust Company, the Sixth Avenue Railroad and the Bank of America. His grandfather Jonathan Thorne (1801-1884) was a leatherworker and tannery manager and "proprietor of one of the largest establishments of trade in New York," according to Prominent Families of New York (1898). Thorne was a seventh generation descendant of William Thorne (c. 1606-c. 1657), one of the original patentees of Flushing and a proprietor of Jamaica, Queens. He descended from Quakers, but in 1870 he was listed as a member of the Fifth Avenue Presbyterian Church.

Thorne graduated Phi Beta Kappa from Yale in 1884.

== Tennis ==
Thorne reached the All-Comers final of the U.S. National Championships in 1884, defeating future champion Henry Slocum and Clarence Clark. He lost to Howard Taylor, who was subsequently defeated in the Challenge Round by three-time defending champion Richard D. Sears.

=== All-Comers singles (1 runner-up) ===
Result	Year	Championship	Surface	Opponent	Score
Loss	1884	U.S. Championships	Grass	(United States) Howard Taylor	4–6, 6–4, 1–6, 4–6

== Career ==
Thorne started at Great Northern Railway Co. before becoming a purchasing assistant for railroad tycoon E. H. Harriman. He was a director at Southern Pacific and Union Pacific Railroads, Wells Fargo Express Oregon Short-Line and the Oregon–Washington Railroad and Navigation Company.

In 1910, he founded the Hospital Bureau of Standards and Supplies in New York City. From 1896 to his death in 1920, he was a senior director at The Presbyterian Hospital and The Women’s Hospital in New York and the Manhattan Maternity and Dispensary. He is the author of a textbook called Hospital Accounting and Statistics.

== Personal life ==
He was married to Theresa Keyser. He died of pneumonia at his home on Park Avenue on February 6, 1920.

== Legacy ==
The Bellwether League Foundation, a healthcare supply chain industry organization called Thorne the “father of cooperative buying."

The Thorne Estate in Morris Township, New Jersey, designed by Delano & Aldrich and completed in 1912, was added to the National Register of Historic Places in 1978.
