= 1884 U.S. National Championships (tennis) =

- Date: August 25–31
- Edition: 4th
- Surface: Grass
- Location: Newport, Rhode Island, U.S.
- Venue: Newport Casino

Champions

Singles
- (United States) Richard D. Sears

Doubles
- (United States) Richard D. Sears / (United States) James Dwight
- U.S. National Championships

The 1884 U.S. National Championships (now known as the US Open) was a tennis tournament that took place in the outdoor grass courts at the Newport Casino in Newport, Rhode Island. The tournament was held from August 25 to August 31. It was the 4th U.S. National Championships and the second Grand Slam tournament of the year.

== Finals ==
=== Singles ===
(United States) Richard D. Sears defeated (United States) Howard Taylor 6–0, 1–6, 6–0, 6–2

=== Doubles ===
(United States) Richard D. Sears / (United States) James Dwight defeated (United States) Walter Berry / (United States) Alexander Van Rensselaer, 6–4, 6–1, 8–10, 6–4

Preceded by 1884 Wimbledon Championships	Grand Slams	Succeeded by 1885 Wimbledon Championships
