= 1887 U.S. National Championships (tennis) =

- Date: August 22 - August 30 (M); September 27 - October 5 (W)
- Edition: 7th
- Category: Grand Slam
- Surface: Grass court
- Location: Philadelphia, PA (WS); Orange Lawn Tennis Club, South Orange, New Jersey (MD); Newport, R.I. (MS)

Champions

Men's singles
- (United States) Richard Sears

Women's singles
- (United States) Ellen Hansell

Men's doubles
- (United States) Richard Sears / (United States) James Dwight
- U.S. National Championships

The 1887 U.S. National Championships (now known as the US Open) was a tennis tournament that took place from August to October 1887.

The men's tournament was held from August 22 to August 30 on the outdoor grass courts at the Newport Casino in Newport, Rhode Island. It was the 7th U.S. National Championships and the second Grand Slam tournament of the year. This was the first edition of the Championships to feature women, as they would compete in their own even at the Philadelphia Cricket Club, PA, which started on September 27 and ended on October 5. 17-year-old Philadelphian Ellen Hansell became the first women's champion. The men's doubles event was played at the Orange Lawn Tennis Club in South Orange, New Jersey.

== Champions ==
=== Men's singles ===
(United States) Richard Sears defeated (United States) Henry Slocum 6–1, 6–3, 6–2

=== Women's singles ===
(United States) Ellen Hansell defeated (United States) Laura Knight 6–1, 6–0

=== Men's doubles ===
(United States) Richard Sears / (United States) James Dwight defeated (United States) Howard Taylor / (United States) Henry Slocum 6–4, 3–6, 2–6, 6–3, 6–3

Preceded by 1887 Wimbledon Championships	Grand Slams	Succeeded by 1888 Wimbledon Championships
