= 1916 Rhode Island gubernatorial election =

- November 7, 1916
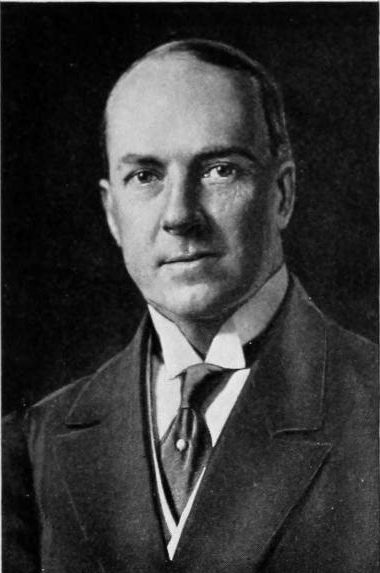

Nominee	Robert Livingston Beeckman	Addison P. Munroe
Party	Republican	Democratic
Popular vote	49,524	36,158
Percentage	55.92%	40.83%
- Beeckman: 50–60% 60–70% 70–80% 80–90% Munroe: 40–50% 50–60%
Governor before election
Robert Livingston Beeckman
Republican
Elected Governor
Robert Livingston Beeckman
Republican

The 1916 Rhode Island gubernatorial election was held on November 7, 1916. Incumbent Republican Robert Livingston Beeckman defeated Democratic nominee Addison P. Munroe with 55.92% of the vote.

== General election ==
=== Candidates ===
Major party candidates

- Robert Livingston Beeckman, Republican
- Addison P. Munroe, Democratic

Other candidates

- John H. Holloway, Socialist
- Roscoe W. Phillips, Prohibition
- Thomas F. Herrick, Socialist Labor

=== Results ===
1916 Rhode Island gubernatorial election
Party	Candidate	Votes	%	±%
Republican	Robert Livingston Beeckman (incumbent)	49,524	55.92%	
Democratic	Addison P. Munroe	36,158	40.83%	
Socialist	John H. Holloway	2,167	2.45%	
Prohibition	Roscoe W. Phillips	518	0.59%	
Socialist Labor	Thomas F. Herrick	201	0.23%	
Majority		13,366		
Turnout				
Republican hold		Swing		
