= 1914 Rhode Island gubernatorial election =

- November 3, 1914
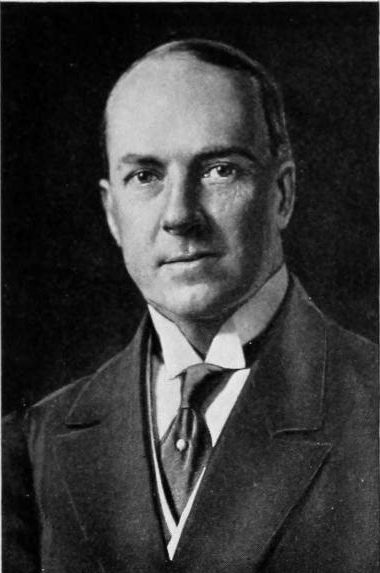

Nominee	Robert Livingston Beeckman	Patrick H. Quinn
Party	Republican	Democratic
Popular vote	41,996	32,182
Percentage	53.80%	41.23%
- Beeckman: 50–60% 60–70% 70–80% 80–90% Quinn: 40–50% 50–60%
Governor before election
Aram J. Pothier
Republican
Elected Governor
Robert Livingston Beeckman
Republican

The 1914 Rhode Island gubernatorial election was held on November 3, 1914. Republican nominee Robert Livingston Beeckman defeated Democratic nominee Patrick H. Quinn with 53.80% of the vote.

== General election ==
=== Candidates ===
Major party candidates

- Robert Livingston Beeckman, Republican
- Patrick H. Quinn, Democratic

Other candidates

- Edward W. Theinert, Socialist
- F. D. Thompson, Progressive
- Ernest L. Merry, Prohibition
- Peter McDermott, Socialist Labor

=== Results ===
1914 Rhode Island gubernatorial election
Party	Candidate	Votes	%	±%
Republican	Robert Livingston Beeckman	41,996	53.80%	
Democratic	Patrick H. Quinn	32,182	41.23%	
Socialist	Edward W. Theinert	1,691	2.17%	
Progressive	F. D. Thompson	1,286	1.65%	
Prohibition	Ernest L. Merry	622	0.80%	
Socialist Labor	Peter McDermott	276	0.35%	
Majority		9,814		
Turnout				
Republican hold		Swing		
