= 1918 Rhode Island gubernatorial election =

- November 5, 1918
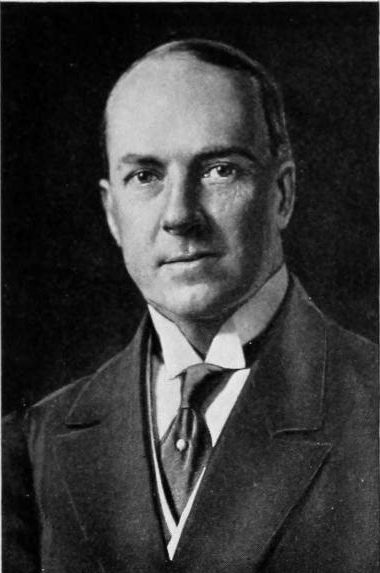

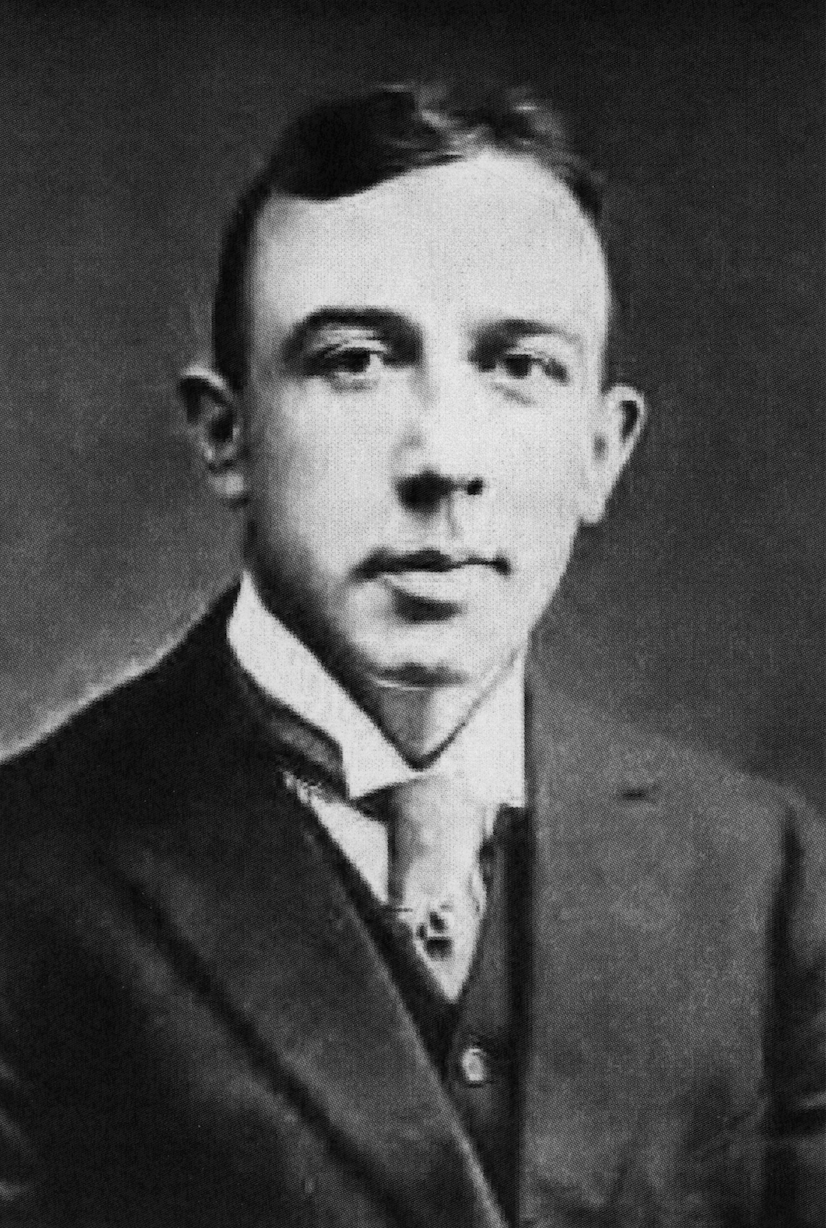
Nominee	Robert Livingston Beeckman	Alberic A. Archambault
Party	Republican	Democratic
Popular vote	42,682	36,031
Percentage	53.11%	44.84%
- Beeckman: 40–50% 50–60% 60–70% 70–80% 80–90% >90% Archambault: 40–50% 50–60%
Governor before election
Robert Livingston Beeckman
Republican
Elected Governor
Robert Livingston Beeckman
Republican

The 1918 Rhode Island gubernatorial election was held on November 5, 1918. Incumbent Republican Robert Livingston Beeckman defeated Democratic nominee Alberic A. Archambault with 53.11% of the vote.

== General election ==
=== Candidates ===
Major party candidates

- Robert Livingston Beeckman, Republican
- Alberic A. Archambault, Democratic

Other candidates

- Ernest Sherwood, Socialist

=== Results ===
1918 Rhode Island gubernatorial election
Party	Candidate	Votes	%	±%
Republican	Robert Livingston Beeckman (incumbent)	42,682	53.11%	
Democratic	Alberic A. Archambault	36,031	44.84%	
Socialist	Ernest Sherwood	1,648	2.05%	
Majority		6,651		
Turnout				
Republican hold		Swing		
