= Beacon Park Open =

Defunct tennis tournament
- Founded: 1880; 145 years ago
- Abolished: 1880; 145 years ago
- Location: Beacon Park, Boston, Massachusetts, United States.
- Surface: Grass

The Beacon Park Open a men's grass court tennis tournament staged only one time in October 1880. The open tournament was organised by the Beacon Park Athletic Association, and played at Beacon Park, Boston, Massachusetts, United States.

== History ==
The Beacon Park tournament was a grass court tennis event organised by the Boston Athletic Assoctiation, and played in October 1880. It is notable for being the first challenge cup tournament to be staged in the United States.

A description of the tournament that took place in Badminton Library of Sports and Pastimes 1890:

In October an open tournament was held at Beacon Park, Boston, for a challenge cup, to be won three times. This was the first challenge cup played for in the country, and was won by Mr. R. D. Sears.

— Heathcote, J. M. (1890). "XVIII: Lawn Tennis in America by R. D. Sears (late Champion of America)". The Badminton Library of Sports and Pastimes. London: Longmans, Green.
