= 1886 U.S. National Championships (tennis) =

- Date: August 23–28
- Edition: 6th
- Category: Grand Slam
- Surface: Grass
- Location: Newport, Rhode Island, United States
- Venue: Newport Casino

Champions

Singles
- (United States) Richard D. Sears

Doubles
- (United States) Richard D. Sears / (United States) James Dwight
- U.S. National Championships

The 1886 U.S. National Championships (now known as the US Open) was a tennis tournament that took place on the outdoor grass courts at the Newport Casino in Newport, Rhode Island. The tournament was held from August 23 to August 28. It was the 6th United States National Championships and the second Grand Slam of the season. This was the final edition of the Championships to exclusively feature men, as women would compete in their own championship, starting with a Singles Championship at the Philadelphia Cricket Club for 1887. The men's and women's championships would be held on separate months for several decades.

== Finals ==
=== Singles ===
(United States) Richard D. Sears defeated (United States) R. Livingston Beeckman 4–6, 6–1, 6–3, 6–4

=== Doubles ===
(United States) Richard D. Sears / (United States) James Dwight defeated (United States) Howard Taylor / (United States) Godfrey Brinley 7–5, 6–8, (Note: Collins has the score 5–7.) 7–5, 6–4

== Notes ==
Preceded by 1886 Wimbledon Championships	Grand Slams	Succeeded by 1887 Wimbledon Championships
