= Alexander Van Rensselaer =

American sportsman, philanthropist, and patron of Princeton University (1850–1933)

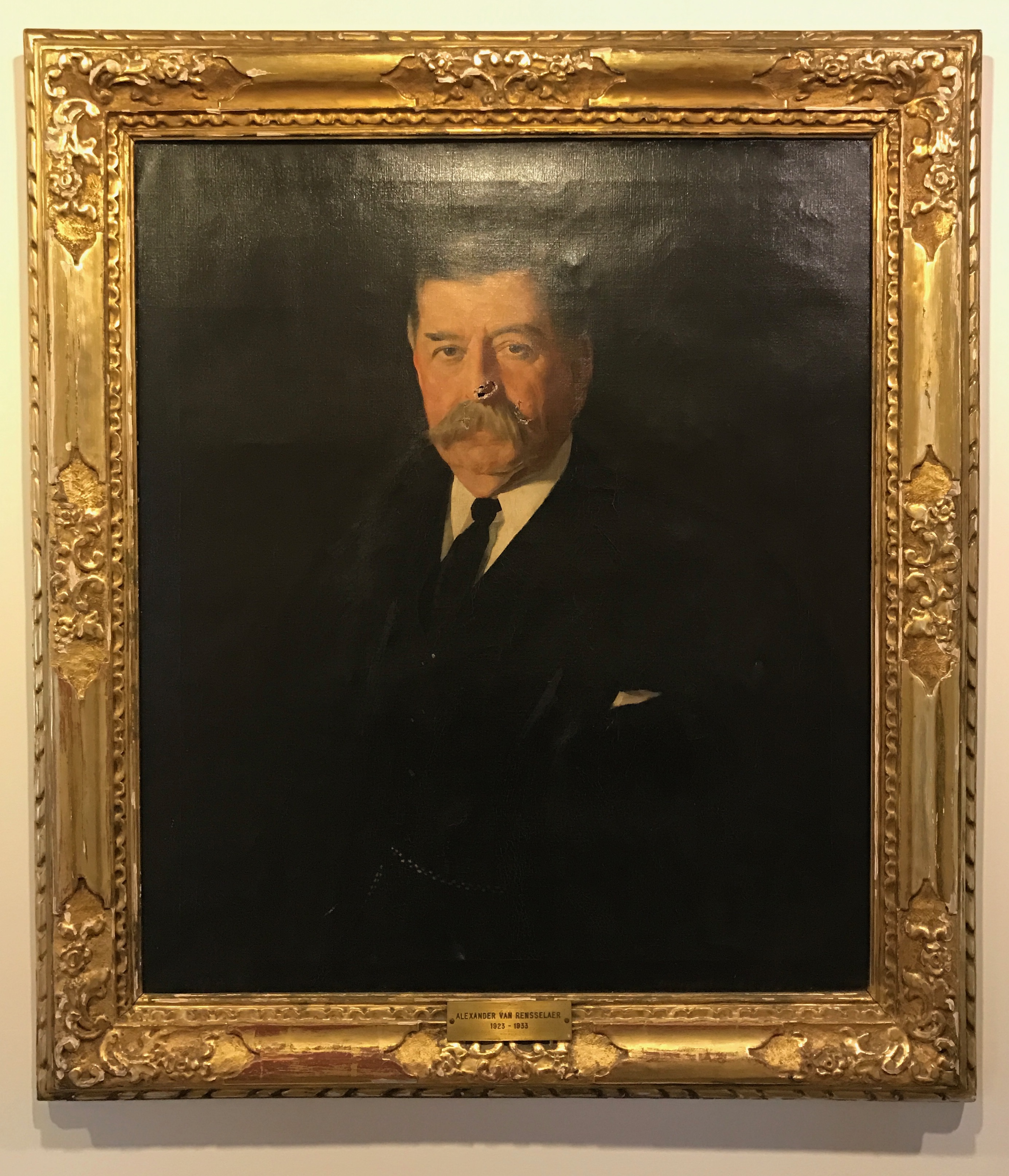
- Van Rensselaer, c. 1923–1933
- Born: October 1, 1850; Burlington, New Jersey, US
- Died: July 18, 1933 (aged 82); Chestnut Hill, Philadelphia, Pennsylvania, US
- Other name: Alex Van
- Education: Princeton University
- Occupations: Tennis player, philanthropist
- Spouse: Sarah Drexel Fell (m. 1898; died 1929)
- Parent(s): Cortlandt Van Rensselaer; Catherine Ledyard
- Relatives: See Van Rensselaer family

Alexander Van Rensselaer (October 1, 1850 – July 18, 1933) was an American philanthropist, sportsman and patron of Princeton University. A member of a prominent Philadelphia family, he played both tennis and cricket at high levels.

== Early life ==
Alexander Van Rensselaer, known as Alec or Alex, was born on October 1, 1850, to the Rev. Cortlandt Van Rensselaer (1808–1860) and his wife, Catherine Ledyard (1811–1882), sister of Henry Ledyard. He was born into a wealthy and influential Philadelphian family. His paternal grandparents were Stephen Van Rensselaer III (1764–1839) and Cornelia Bell Paterson, the daughter of William Paterson, the 2nd Governor of New Jersey, and later, an Associate Justice of the Supreme Court of the United States. His paternal uncles included Stephen Van Rensselaer IV (1789–1868) and Henry Bell Van Rensselaer (1810–1864). He graduated from Princeton University in 1871.

== Career ==
Due to his and his wife's family wealth, it was never necessary for the couple to work for a living. Instead they focused on fostering science and arts in Philadelphia. From 1901 until shortly before his death, Alexander was president of the Philadelphia Orchestra Association. In addition, he was a member of the board of trustees at Princeton University. Sarah gave large parts of her wealth to the Drexel Institute that was founded by her father. In 1901, Alex and Sarah traveled around the world and were guests of Japanese Emperor Meiji, the British royal family and the Viceroy of India.

In 1908, Van Rensselaer became president of the Board of Trustees of Drexel University.

=== Sports career ===
An outstanding tennis player, Van Rensselaer took part in the first stagings of the US Tennis Championships in the 1880s, losing in the quarterfinals to Howard Taylor in 1884. In 1881, 1883 and 1884, he reached the finals of the doubles competition.

Van Rensselaer also played cricket at high levels, during a time when the sport in Philadelphia was at its most popular, and Philadelphian cricket teams regularly drew touring international teams to play in the United States, and went on overseas tours themselves. In the Halifax Cup, the premier American tournament at the time, Van Rensselaer represented the Young America Cricket Club, which won the tournament in 1880, 1881, 1883, and 1885. A wicket-keeper, he made a single first-class appearance for the "American Born" in the 1880 American Born v English Residents match, scoring three runs for the match and recording two dismissals – a catch and a stumping. He was still playing as late as the 1891 season, aged 41, when he toured Chicago and Pittsburgh with the Germantown Cricket Club.

In 1892 he was a charter member of the Corinthian Yacht Club of Philadelphia.

=== Grand Slam record ===
Runners-up (3)

Year	Championship	Partner	Opponents	Score
1881	U.S. Championships	(United States) Arthur E. Newbold	(United States) Clarence Clark (United States) Frederick Winslow Taylor	5–6, 4–6, 5–6
1883	U.S. Championships	(United States) Arthur E. Newbold	(United States) James Dwight (United States) Richard Sears	0–6, 2–6, 2–6
1884	U.S. Championships	(United States) Walter V.R. Berry	(United States) James Dwight (United States) Richard Sears	4–6, 1–6, 10–8, 4–6

== Personal life ==
On January 27, 1898, he married Sarah Rozet Drexel Fell (1860–1929), daughter of Anthony Joseph Drexel (1826–1893), who was previously married to John R. Fell Sr. (1858–1895) until his death, at which point she inherited an estimated $35,000,000. Van Rensselaer was the stepfather to Sarah's children from her first marriage, including: Amanda Drexel Fell (1880–1954), Mae Drexel Fell (1884–1948), Frances Drexel Paul Fell (1887–1961), John Gillingham Fell (1890–1933), who died a few months before Van Rensselaer of a stab wound on a wedding trip.

His wife, Sarah, died in 1929 at age 69, at their country estate, Camp Hill Hall, in Fort Washington. Her estate was left to Van Rensselaer, with the remainder to her children, after his death. Today, Camp Hill Hall, located at 709 Pennsylvania Avenue, is the United States headquarters for the missionary organization WEC International.

Van Rensselaer died on July 18, 1933, four years after his wife, at the age of 82 in Philadelphia. He was buried at the Saint Thomas Episcopal Church Cemetery at Whitemarsh Township, Pennsylvania.
