= James Dwight =

American tennis player

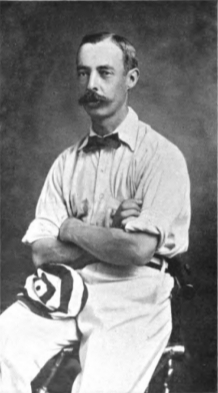
- Dwight (before 1903)
- Country (sports): United States
- Born: July 14, 1852 Paris, France
- Died: July 13, 1917 (aged 64) Mattapoisett, Massachusetts, U.S.
- Turned pro: 1876 (amateur tour)
- Retired: 1913
- Plays: Right-handed (one-handed backhand)
- Int. Tennis HoF: 1955 (member page)

Singles
- Career record: 87–30 (74.3%)
- Career titles: 12

Grand Slam singles results
- Wimbledon: SF (1885)
- US Open: F (1883)

Grand Slam doubles results
- Wimbledon: SF (1884, 1885)
- US Open: W (1882, 1883, 1884, 1886, 1887)

James Dwight (July 14, 1852, France – July 13, 1917) was an American tennis player who was known as the "Founding Father of American Tennis".

== Biography ==
Dwight won the first recorded tournament in the U.S. (and probably in the world, before the first Wimbledon Championships) played in August 1876 on the property of his uncle, William Appleton, at Nahant, Massachusetts. After graduating from Harvard in 1874, he traveled in Europe, saw the new sport of lawn tennis being played, and brought the necessary equipment home. Then he persuaded his uncle to mark out a court on his smooth front lawn so he could play a game with his cousin Fred Sears.

That first attempt was disappointing. Dwight later wrote "we voted the whole thing a fraud and put it away." About a month later, they tried again as a way of passing time on a rainy day. This time, tennis seemed much more interesting, even though they were wearing rubber boots and raincoats. The 1876 tournament was a neighborhood affair: "it was played on handicap on a round robin basis. There were two players on scratch, James Dwight and Fred D Sears Jr., each of whom played against 11 other players until a final between them. Rackets scoring was used...Dwight beat Sears 12–15 15–7 15–13. By then, Dwight and Sears had taught the game to a number of people, including Richard Dudley "Dick" Sears, another cousin, who went on to win the first seven national singles championships.

Dwight was one of the founders of the U.S. National Lawn Tennis Association in 1881, and he served as its president for 21 years. He never won the singles championship, but he reached the tournament final in 1883 losing to Richard Sears, with whom he did team to take five national doubles titles, from 1882 through 1884 and from 1886 through 1887. In a rare transatlantic trip in those days, James Dwight entered the 1884 and 1885 Wimbledon tournaments, reaching the semifinals in 1885 (losing to Herbert Lawford).

His other career tournaments singles wins include the Longwood Bowl in Boston (1884), the Brighton Lawn Tennis Club Tournament (1885), Brincliffe Lawn Tennis Club Open Tournament (1885) held at Sheffield in England, the Warwickshire Championships (1885, 1887), the Northern Championships (1885), the Brookfield Isle of Wight Open (1884-1885), and the West of England Championships (1886).

He was inducted to the International Tennis Hall of Fame in 1955.

== Grand Slam finals ==
=== Singles (1 runner-up) ===
Result	Year	Championship	Surface	Opponent	Score
Loss	1883	U.S. National Championships	Grass	(United States) Richard Sears	2–6, 0–6, 7–9

=== Doubles (5 titles) ===
Result	Year	Championship	Surface	Partner	Opponents	Score
Win	1882	U.S. Championships	Grass	(United States) Richard Sears	(United States) Crawford Nightingale (United States) G M Smith	6–2, 6–4, 6–4
Win	1883	U.S. Championships	Grass	(United States) Richard Sears	(United States) Alexander Van Rensselaer (United States) Arthur Newbold	6–0, 6–2, 6–2
Win	1884	U.S. Championships	Grass	(United States) Richard Sears	(United States) Alexander Van Rensselaer (United States) W.V.R. Berry	6–4, 6–1, 8–10, 6–4
Win	1886	U.S. Championships	Grass	(United States) Richard Sears	(United States) Howard Taylor (United States) Godfrey Brinley	6–3, 6–0, 6–2
Win	1887	U.S. Championships	Grass	(United States) Richard Sears	(United States) Howard Taylor (United States) Henry Slocum	6–4, 3–6, 2–6, 6–3, 6–3

== See also ==
- Mary Ewing Outerbridge
- History of tennis
