= Richard Sears (tennis) =

American sportsman (1861–1943)

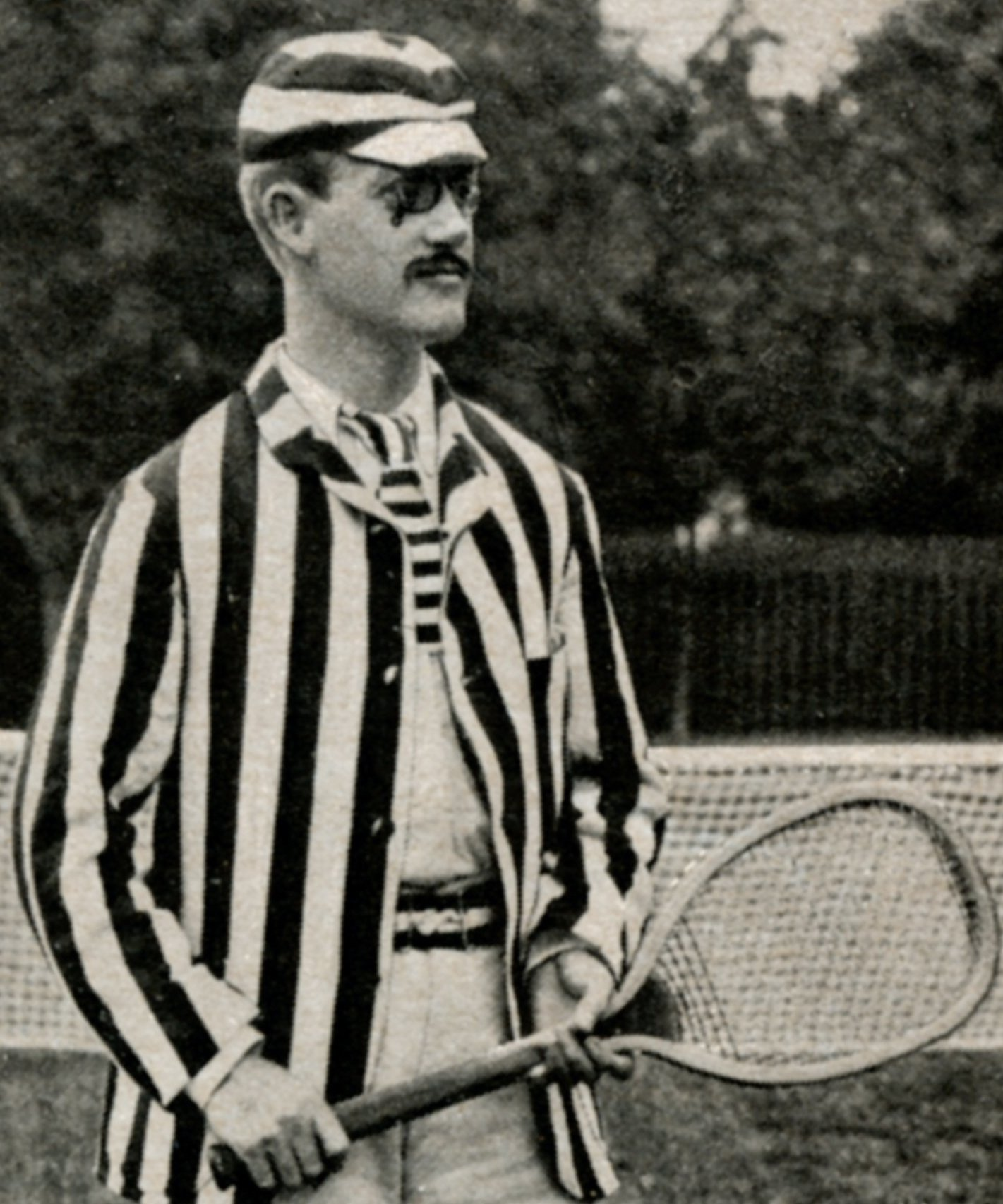
- Full name: Richard Dudley Sears
- Country (sports): United States
- Born: October 26, 1861 Boston, Massachusetts, US
- Died: April 8, 1943 (aged 81) Boston, Massachusetts, US
- Turned pro: 1880 (amateur tour)
- Retired: 1888
- Plays: Right-handed (one-handed backhand)
- Int. Tennis HoF: 1955 (member page)

Singles
- Career record: 43–8 (84.3%)
- Career titles: 9
- Highest ranking: No. 5 (1887, ITHF)

Grand Slam singles results
- Wimbledon: 1R (1884)
- US Open: W (1881, 1882, 1883, 1884, 1885, 1886, 1887)

Grand Slam doubles results
- Wimbledon: SF (1884)
- US Open: W (1882, 1883, 1884, 1885, 1886, 1887)

Richard Dudley Sears (October 26, 1861 – April 8, 1943) was an American tennis player, who won the US National Championships singles in its first seven years, from 1881 to 1887, and the doubles for six years from 1882 to 1887, after which he retired from tennis.

== Early life ==
He was the son of Frederic Richard Sears and Albertina Homer Shelton. His brothers Philip and Herbert were also tennis players.

== Tennis career ==
Sears learned to play tennis in 1879. Sears played his first tournament and won his first title at the Beacon Park Open held at Beacon Park in Boston in October 1880. He was undefeated in the U.S. Championships, he won the first of his seven consecutive titles in 1881 while still a student at Harvard. In those days, the previous year's winner had an automatic place in the final. Starting in the 1881 first round, he went on an 18-match unbeaten streak that took him through the 1887 championships, after which he retired from the game. Not until 1921 was his 18-match unbeaten run overtaken (by Bill Tilden). During his first three championships, Sears did not lose a single set. Sears was the first 19-year-old to win in the U.S., slightly older than Oliver Campbell in 1890 and Pete Sampras in 1990.

Although primarily remembered for his grand slam titles he did compete in and win other titles. He won his first tournament at Beacon Park in Boston in 1880, defeating Edward Gray. In May 1883, he reached the semifinals of the Longwood Bowl in Boston, losing to James Dwight by a walkover. In 1884 he traveled to Europe to play tournaments in Great Britain and Ireland. At the second major tournament of the 19th century the Irish Championships, held in Dublin he reached the quarterfinals before losing to eventual champion Herbert Lawford in three sets. Sears had to withdraw from the West of England Championships held at Bath due to a foot injury but in June he reached the final of the East Gloucestershire Championships held at Cheltenham, losing in three sets to Donald Stewart.

He then traveled to Manchester to compete at the second most important English tournament at the time the Northern Championships where he also reached the quarterfinals, again losing to Stewart. Unable to compete at the Wimbledon Championships due to a wrist injury he returned to the United States in July after the U.S. Championships he entered the U.S. National Collegiate Championships in Hartford, Connecticut, where he reached the semi-finals. In June 1885 he won the Middle States Championships in Hoboken, New Jersey, defeating Howard Taylor.

Sears was the first U.S. No. 1 in the USLTA rankings, when they began in 1885 and retained the ranking in 1886 and 1887.

After giving up playing lawn tennis, Sears won the U.S. Court Tennis singles title in 1892 and also served as USTA president in 1887 and 1888.

== Personal life ==
Sears married Eleanor M. Cochrane on November 24, 1891, and they had two children, Richard Dudley Sears Jr. and Miriam Sears. Sears died on April 8, 1943. His grandson, the son of Richard D. Sears Jr., was the Massachusetts politician John W. Sears.

== Legacy ==
Sears was inducted in the International Tennis Hall of Fame in 1955.

== In popular culture ==
The character Dick Sears appeared in the second episode of the second season of the HBO television show The Gilded Age to win a local tournament at the Newport Casino, where the real Sears won the first National Championship.

== Grand Slam finals ==
=== Singles (7 titles) ===
Result	Year	Championship	Opponent	Score
Win	1881	U.S. Championships	(United Kingdom) William E. Glyn	6–0, 6–3, 6–2
Win	1882	U.S. Championships (2)	(United States) Clarence Clark	6–1, 6–4, 6–0
Win	1883	U.S. Championships (3)	(United States) James Dwight	6–2, 6–0, 9–7
Win	1884	U.S. Championships (4)	(United States) Howard Taylor	6–0, 1–6, 6–0, 6–2
Win	1885	U.S. Championships (5)	(United States) Godfrey Brinley	6–3, 4–6, 6–0, 6–3
Win	1886	U.S. Championships (6)	(United States) R. Livingston Beeckman	4–6, 6–1, 6–3, 6–4
Win	1887	U.S. Championships (7)	(United States) Henry Slocum	6–1, 6–3, 6–2

=== Doubles (6 titles) ===
Result	Year	Championship	Partner	Opponents	Score
Win	1882	U.S. Championships	(United States) James Dwight	(United States) Crawford Nightingale (United States) G M Smith	6–2, 6–4, 6–4
Win	1883	U.S. Championships	(United States) James Dwight	(United States) Alexander Van Rensselaer (United States) Arthur Newbold	6–0, 6–2, 6–2
Win	1884	U.S. Championships	(United States) James Dwight	(United States) Alexander Van Rensselaer (United States) W.V.R. Berry	6–4, 6–1, 8–10, 6–4
Win	1885	U.S. Championships	(United States) Joseph Clark	(United States) Henry Slocum (United States) Wallace P. Knapp	6–3, 6–0, 6–2
Win	1886	U.S. Championships	(United States) James Dwight	(United States) Howard Taylor (United States) Godfrey Brinley	6–3, 6–0, 6–2
Win	1887	U.S. Championships	(United States) James Dwight	(United States) Howard Taylor (United States) Henry Slocum	6–4, 3–6, 2–6, 6–3, 6–3
