= Fred S. Mansfield =

American tennis player

Fred Mansfield
- Full name: Frederick Sherwood Mansfield
- Country (sports): United States
- Born: September 15, 1850 Dorchester, MA, United States
- Died: November 28, 1922 (aged 72) Somerville, MA, United States
- Turned pro: 1884 (amateur tour)
- Retired: 1899

Singles

Grand Slam singles results
- US Open: QF (1886, 1887, 1889)

Frederick Sherwood Mansfield (September 15, 1850 - November 28, 1922) was an American tennis player active in the late 19th century.

Mansfield reached the quarterfinals of the U.S. National Championships in 1886, 1887 and 1889. He won the Canadian International Championships in 1891.
