= Henry Slocum (tennis) =

American tennis player

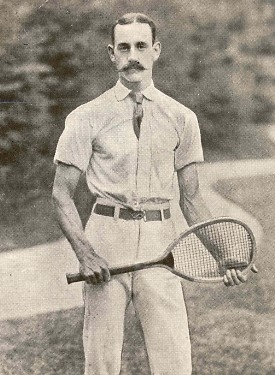
- Full name: Henry Warner Slocum, Jr.
- Country (sports): United States
- Born: May 28, 1862 Syracuse, New York, United States
- Died: January 22, 1949 (aged 86) Manhattan, New York City, United States
- Height: 5 ft 10 in (1.78 m)
- Turned pro: 1884 (amateur tour)
- Retired: 1913
- Plays: Right-handed (one-handed backhand)
- Int. Tennis HoF: 1955 (member page)

Singles
- Career record: 112-57 (66.2%)
- Career titles: 9
- Highest ranking: No. 8 (1888, ITHF)

Grand Slam singles results
- US Open: W (1888, 1889)

Grand Slam doubles results
- US Open: W (1889)

Henry Warner Slocum, Jr. (May 28, 1862 – January 22, 1949) was an American male tennis player who was active in the late 19th century.

== Biography ==
He was born on May 28, 1862, in Syracuse, New York, to Henry Warner Slocum.

Slocum graduated from Yale University in 1883 and started playing tennis in 1884 although he entered few prominent tournaments until the spring of 1886. Slocum won the 1888 Men's Singles title at the U.S. National Championships' in Newport against defending champion and compatriot Howard Taylor in straight sets. The next year he successfully defended his title in the Challenge Round with a victory over Quincy Shaw.

His other career highlights include winning the Rockaway Hunting Club Invitation three times (1886–1888), the Wentworth Open Tournament at Wentworth, New Hampshire (1887), the Staten Island Invitation (1887).

He was president of the United States National Lawn Tennis Association (USNLTA) in 1892 and 1893.

He died on January 22, 1949, at St. Luke's Hospital in Manhattan, New York City.

== Legacy ==
Slocum was inducted into the International Tennis Hall of Fame in 1955. In 1890 he published a book titled Lawn Tennis in Our Own Country.

== Grand Slam finals ==
=== Singles (2 titles, 2 runners-up) ===
Result	Year	Championship	Surface	Opponent	Score
Loss	1887	U.S. Championships	Grass	(United States) Richard Sears	1–6, 3–6, 2–6
Win	1888	U.S. Championships	Grass	(United States) Howard Taylor	6–4, 6–1, 6–0
Win	1889	U.S. Championships	Grass	(United States) Quincy Shaw	6–3, 6–1, 4–6, 6–2
Loss	1890	U.S. Championships	Grass	(United States) Oliver Campbell	2–6, 6–4, 3–6, 1–6

=== Doubles (1 title, 2 runners-up) ===
Result	Year	Championship	Surface	Partner	Opponents	Score
Loss	1885	U.S. Championships	Grass	(United States) Percy Knapp	(United States) Joseph Clark (United States) Richard Sears	3–6, 0–6, 2–6
Loss	1887	U.S. Championships	Grass	(United States) Howard Taylor	(United States) James Dwight (United States) Richard Sears	4–6, 6–3, 6–2, 3–6, 3–6
Win	1889	U.S. Championships	Grass	(United States) Howard Taylor	(United States) Valentine Hall (United States) Oliver Campbell	14–12, 10–8, 6–4

Allen & Genter Cigarettes

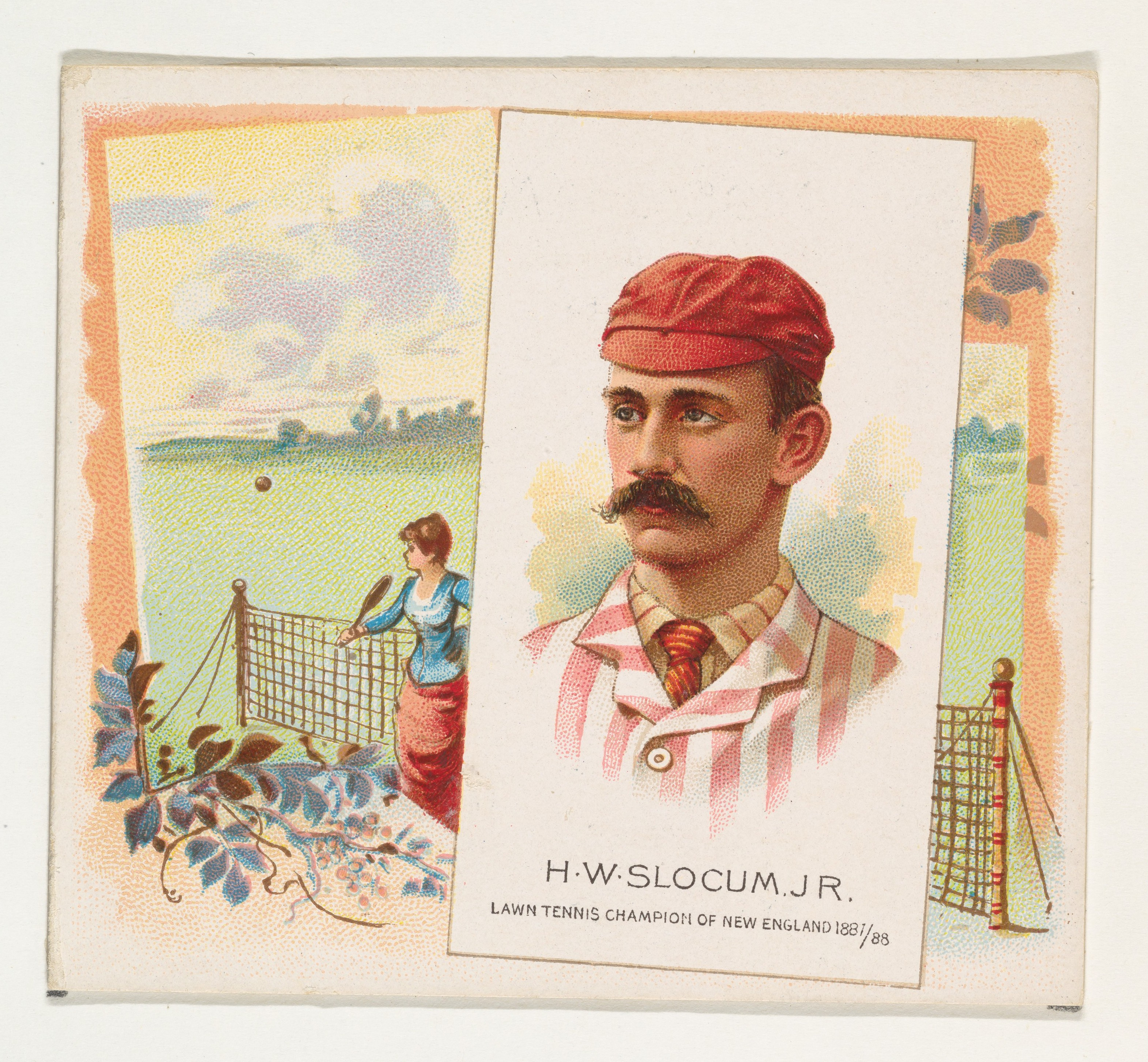
From World's Champions, Second Series (N43) for Allen & Ginter Cigarettes, print. Litographer: Lindner, Eddy & Claus of New York

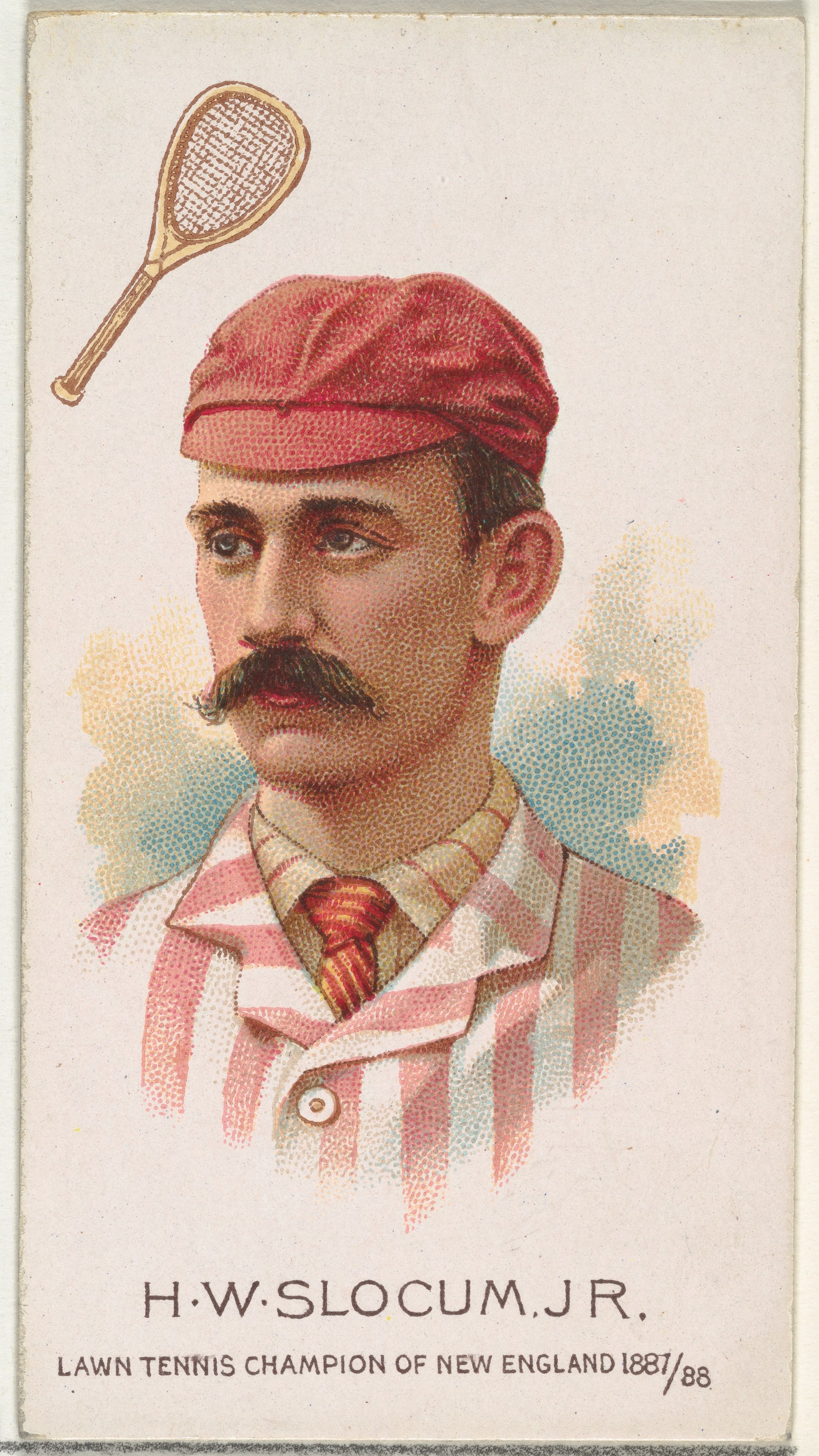
From World's Champions, Second Series (N29) for Allen & Ginter Cigarettes, print, Lithographer: Lindner, Eddy & Claus

== Singles performance timeline ==
Key
W	F	SF	QF	#R	RR	Q#	DNQ	A	NH

(W) winner; (F) finalist; (SF) semifinalist; (QF) quarterfinalist; (#R) rounds 4, 3, 2, 1; (RR) round-robin stage; (Q#) qualification round; (DNQ) did not qualify; (A) absent; (NH) not held; (SR) strike rate (events won / competed); (W–L) win–loss record.

Events with a challenge round: (W_{C}) won; (CR) lost the challenge round; (F_{A}) all comers' finalist

	1884	1885	1886	1887	1888	1889	1890	1891	1892	1893	1894	1895	1896	1897	1898	1899	1900	1901	1902	1903	1904	1905	1906	1907	1908	1909	1910	1911	1912	1913	SR	W–L	Win %
Grand Slam tournaments
French	Not held							Only for French club members																							0 / 0	0–0	–
Wimbledon	A	A	A	A	A	A	A	A	A	A	A	A	A	A	A	A	A	A	A	A	A	A	A	A	A	A	A	A	A	A	0 / 0	–	–
U.S.	3R	2R	QF	CR	W	W_{C}	CR	A	3R	A	A	A	A	A	A	A	A	A	A	2R	A	3R	A	1R	2R	4R	4R	4R	5R	3R	2 / 17	25–14	64.1
Australian	Not held																					A	A	A	A	A	A	A	A	A	0 / 0	0–0	–
Win–loss	1–0	0–1	2–1	4–1	5–0	1–0	0–1		1–1											0–1		2–1		0–1	0–1	1–1	2–1	2–1	3–1	1–1	2 / 17	25–14	64.1
