= Percy Knapp =

American tennis player

- Full name: Wallace Percy Knapp
- Country (sports): United States
- Born: 7 August 1863; South Norwalk, Connecticut, United States
- Died: August 29, 1917 (aged 54). New York City, New York, United States
- Turned pro: 1884 (amateur tour)
- Retired: 1903

Singles

Grand Slam singles results
- US Open: F (1885, 1890)

Doubles

Grand Slam doubles results
- US Open: QF (1884)

Wallace Percy Knapp (July 8, 1863 – August 29, 1917) was an American tennis player active in the late 19th century.

Knapp reached the All-Comers final of the U.S. National Championships in 1885 (beating Howard Taylor and Joseph Clark before losing to Godfrey Brinley) and 1890 (beating Clarence Hobart before losing to Oliver Campbell). Knapp also reached the semifinals in 1884 and 1889.

== Grand Slam finals ==
=== All-Comers singles (2 runner-ups) ===
Result	Year	Championship	Surface	Opponent	Score
Loss	1885	U.S. Championships	Grass	(United States) Godfrey Brinley	3–6, 3–6, 6–3, 4–6
Loss	1890	U.S. Championships	Grass	(United States) Oliver Campbell	6–8, 6–0, 2–6, 3–6
