= Godfrey Brinley =

American tennis player, Educator and Priest

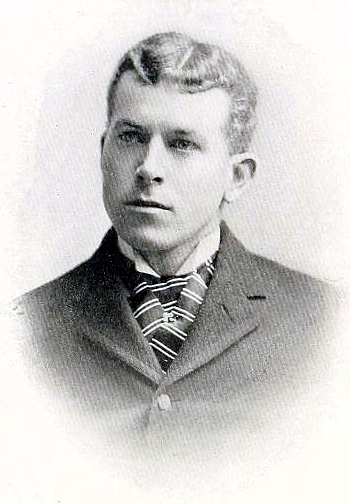
- Brinley in 1901
- Full name: Godfrey Malbone Brinley
- Country (sports): United States
- Born: November 22, 1864; Perth Amboy, New Jersey, U.S.
- Died: May 6, 1939 (aged 74); Ragusa, Yugoslavia
- Turned pro: 1882 (amateur tour)
- Retired: 1888
- College: Trinity College

Singles

Grand Slam singles results
- US Open: F (1885^{Ch})

Doubles

Grand Slam doubles results
- US Open: SF (1884)

Godfrey Malbone Brinley (November 22, 1864 – May 6, 1939) was a tennis player from the United States, born in Perth Amboy, New Jersey.

He was a boy when tennis was first introduced to New Jersey and he took to the game quickly. At St. Paul’s boarding school in Concord, New Hampshire, he excelled in tennis and squash.

At age 17, Brinley entered the Orange Lawn Tennis Club Open tournament, where he defeated Howard Taylor in the semi-finals and J.F. Bacon in the finals to win his first top-tier title. In 1883, while studying at Trinity College, he entered the U.S. Championships in Newport and reached the quarterfinals before falling to James Dwight in three sets. In 1884, he bowed out in the second round, defeated by Taylor, but he reached the semifinals of the doubles.

In 1885, Brinley joined the ranks of the game’s top players when he won the all-comers draw at the U.S. Championships to earn a place in the Challenge Round against defending champion Richard Sears. He lost to Sears in four sets. Brinley was crowned U.S. Intercollegiate champion in 1886, beating Philip Sears of Harvard in the Intercollegiate Championships final in New Haven. Sears would go on to win the 1887 and 1888 titles.

He reached the challenge round at the U.S. National Championships in 1885, beating Henry Slocum and Percy Knapp before finishing runner-up to four-time defending champion Richard Sears. Brinley also reached the quarterfinals in 1883 and 1887 and was amongst the top ten American tennis players from 1885 to 1887. He continued to play competitively until 1889, when he entered the priesthood. He served as Master of School at St. Paul's in Concord from 1888–1930, and was buried there in 1939.

== Grand Slam finals ==
=== Singles (1 runner-up) ===
| Result | Year | Championship | Surface | Opponent | Score |
|---|---|---|---|---|---|
| Loss | 1885 | U.S. Championships | Grass | (United States) Richard Sears | 3–6, 6–4, 0–6, 3–6 |

=== Doubles (1 runner-up) ===
| Result | Year | Championship | Surface | Partner | Opponents | Score |
|---|---|---|---|---|---|---|
| Loss | 1886 | U.S. Championships | Grass | (United States) Howard Taylor | (United States) James Dwight (United States) Richard Sears | 5–7, 8–6, 5–7, 4–6 |
