= Walter Van Rensselaer Berry =

American judge and tennis player

Walter Berry
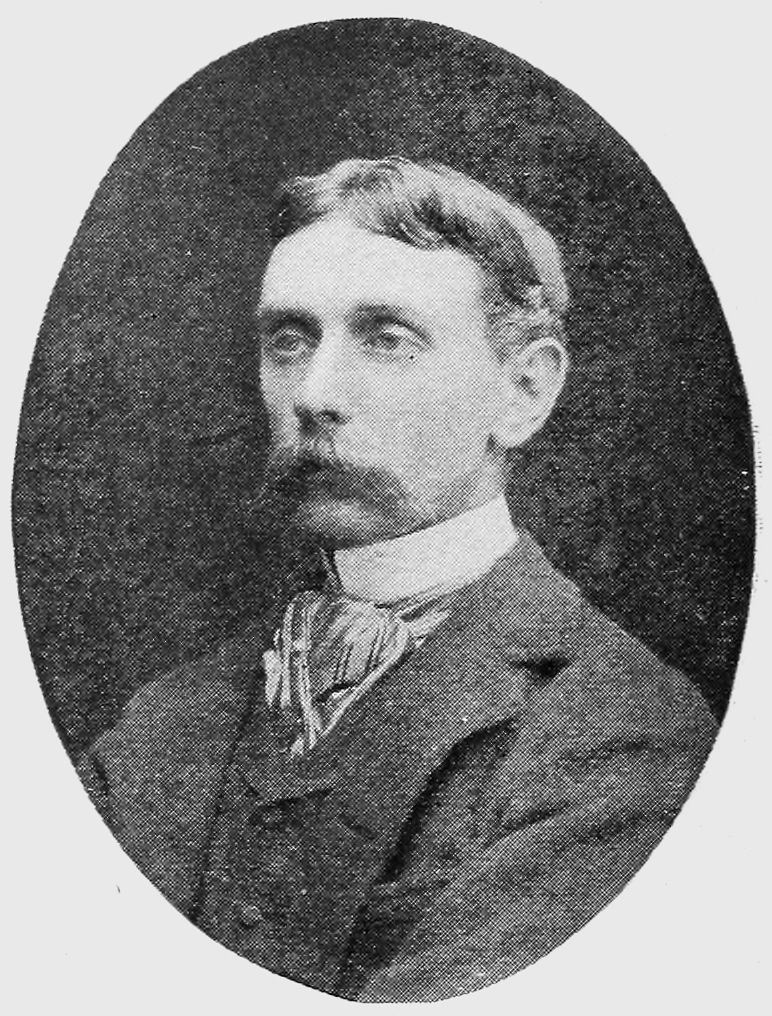
- Full name: Walter Van Rensselaer Berry
- Country (sports): United States
- Born: July 29, 1859 Paris, France
- Died: October 12, 1927 (aged 68) Paris, France
- Height: 6'

Grand Slam singles results
- US Open: SF (1885) (1886)

Grand Slam doubles results
- US Open: F (1884)

Walter Van Rensselaer Berry (July 29, 1859 – October 12, 1927) was an American lawyer, international judge, tennis player, and Francophile. He was a judge at the International Mixed Tribunal of Cairo, Egypt. He was also a leading American tennis player active in the late 19th century, winning the 1884 U.S. National Championships – Doubles. While living as an expat in Paris, Berry was a close associate of Henry James, Marcel Proust, and Edith Wharton.

== Early life ==
Berry was born on July 29, 1859 in Paris, France. His parents were Catherine Van Rensselaer and Nathaniel Berry. He was descendant of the Van Rensselaer family of New York. Berry early years were spent in Paris, before his family returned to Albany, New York. He attended St. Mark's School.

Berry graduated from Harvard University in 1881. While there, he was a member of Delta Kappa Epsion (aka The Dickey Club). Berry enrolled in Columbia University in 1883. He was admitted to the bar in 1885.

== Tennis ==
Berry was an amateur competitive tennis player when he was in his twenties. He came in second place in the 1884 U.S. National Championships – Doubles, paired with his cousin Alexander Van Rensselaer.

In 1885, he won the men's singles at the Wentworth Invitation, the Narragansett Pier Open, and the Lenox Invitation. He was a semi-finalist in Orange Spring Opent in 1885.

Berry played in the semifinals of the 1885 U.S. National Championships – Singles. He ended the 1885 season ranked number three in the United States. In October 1885, the New-York Tribune ranked Berry as one of the top three players in the United States. The Tribune noted:

Berry's game is an enigma. He is tall, has a long reach, and returns 'lobbed' balls swiftly. There is only one way to beat him. Place a ball low over the net and down a side line, and he is powerless. All other play is fatal.

In 1886, Berry won the men's singles at Bar Harbor. He played in the 1886 U.S. National Championships – Singles, losing in the third round. Unfortunately, Berry's health was an issue, forcing him to retire from competitive tennis.

== Career ==
Berry opened a law firm specializing in international law in Washington, D.C. in 1885. He was legal adviser of the French and Italian governments. He was a judge at the International Mixed Tribunal of Cairo, Egypt from 1908 to 1911 He resigned from the position due to poor health.

Berry then settled in Paris for the remainder of his life. He became a strong advocate of France, tirelessly promoting its cause in the United States. Berry was the president of the American Chamber of Commerce in Paris from 1916 to 1923. After World War I, he vigorously opposed both Germany and the Soviet Union. After the U.S. Ambassador to France, Berry was considered the most influential American in France.

== Honors ==
Berry received the Commandeur (Commander) of the Legion of Honour from the French government. He received the Order of the Crown of Italy and the Order of Saints Maurice and Lazarus from Italy.

== Personal life ==
Berry was a close friend of Henry James and Edith Wharton, who called Berry "the love of my life". He was also friends with Caresse and Harry Crosby. Berry met Marcel Proust in the summer of 1916, beginning "a friendship that was to be one of the most rewarding of Proust's final years."

Geoffrey Wolff, in his life of Harry Crosby, describes Berry as a fashion plate well over six feet tall. Caresse described him to me very much as she did in her careless memoirs—slimness, thinness, wearing a morning coat and striped trousers like a diplomat and highly polished button-shoes. His arms were long and like pipestems. He could be witty, if a little on the pedantic side. His manner with women (said Caresse) was "gallant and wicked." Something frigid and formidable about his countenance, very sec.

Berry belonged to the Knickerbocker Club in New York City and the Metropolitan Club in Washington, D.C., He continued to play tennis in Paris at the Bois de Boulogne.

Berry died on October 12, 1927, in his apartment in Paris, France, after two months of illness. He never married. He bequeathed his cousin, Harry Crosby, "my entire library except such items as my good friend Edith Wharton may care to choose."
