= Howard Taylor (tennis) =

American tennis player

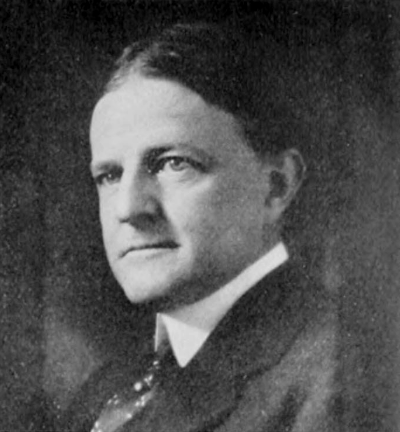
- Full name: Howard Augustus Taylor
- Country (sports): United States
- Born: November 23, 1865 New York City, United States
- Died: November 26, 1920 (aged 55) New York City, United States
- Turned pro: 1879 (amateur tour)
- Retired: 1890

Singles

Grand Slam singles results
- Wimbledon: 1R (1879)
- US Open: F (1884^{Ch}, 1886, 1887, 1888)

Doubles

Grand Slam doubles results
- US Open: W (1889)

Signature
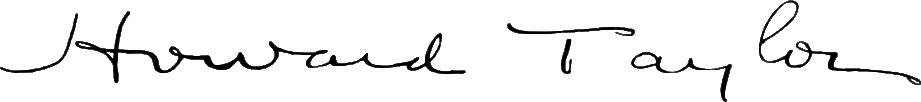

Howard Augustus Taylor (November 23, 1865 – November 26, 1920) was a tennis player from the United States.

== Biography ==
Howard Taylor was born in New York City on November 23, 1865. Taylor attended Harvard University, where he was an NCAA singles and doubles champion in 1883.

He reached the Challenge Round at the U.S. National Championships in 1884 (beating Joseph Clark, Percy Knapp and William Thorne before losing to Richard Sears). Taylor reached the all comers final in 1886 (beating James Dwight and Clark before losing to Robert Livingston Beeckman). He reached the all comers final in 1887 (beating Oliver Campbell before losing to Henry Slocum). Slocum beat him in the all comers final again in 1888. Taylor also won the doubles title in 1889 alongside Slocum, finishing runner-up in 1886 and 1887.

His occupation was a lawyer. He died at his home in New York City on November 26, 1920.

== Grand Slam finals ==
=== Singles (1 runner-up) ===
Result	Year	Championship	Surface	Opponent	Score
Loss	1884	U.S. Championships	Grass	(United States) Richard Sears	0–6, 6–1, 0–6, 2–6

=== Doubles (1 title, 2 runner-ups) ===
Result	Year	Championship	Surface	Partner	Opponents	Score
Loss	1886	U.S. Championships	Grass	(United States) Godfrey Brinley	(United States) James Dwight (United States) Richard Sears	5–7, 8–6, 5–7, 4–6
Loss	1887	U.S. Championships	Grass	(United States) Henry Slocum	(United States) James Dwight (United States) Richard Sears	4–6, 6–3, 6–2, 3–6, 3–6
Win	1889	U.S. Championships	Grass	(United States) Henry Slocum	(United States) Valentine Hall (United States) Oliver Campbell	14–12, 10–8, 6–4
