= Robert Livingston Beeckman =

American stockbroker, sportsman, and politician

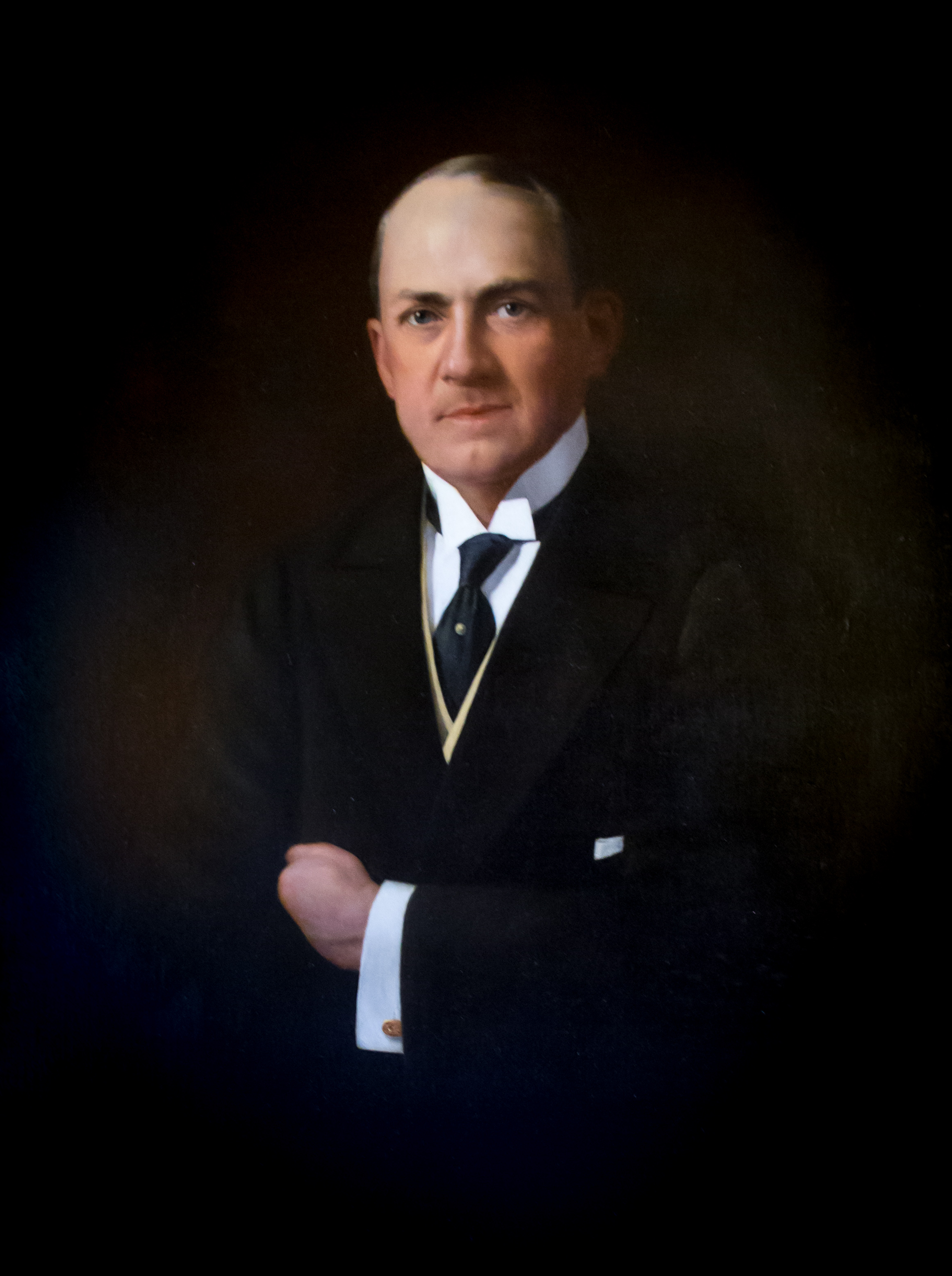

52nd Governor of Rhode Island
- In office January 5, 1915 – January 4, 1921
- Lieutenant Governor: Emery J. San Souci
- Preceded by: Aram J. Pothier
- Succeeded by: Emery J. San Souci

Member of the Rhode Island Senate
- In office 1912–1914

Member of the Rhode Island House of Representatives
- In office 1908–1912

Personal details
- Born: April 15, 1866 New York City, New York, US
- Died: January 21, 1935 (aged 68) Santa Barbara, California, US
- Resting place: Sleepy Hollow Cemetery, Sleepy Hollow, New York
- Party: Republican
- Spouses: Eleanor Thomas (m. 1902; died 1920) Edna Marston Burke (m. 1923)
- Profession: Stockbroker

Robert Livingston Beeckman
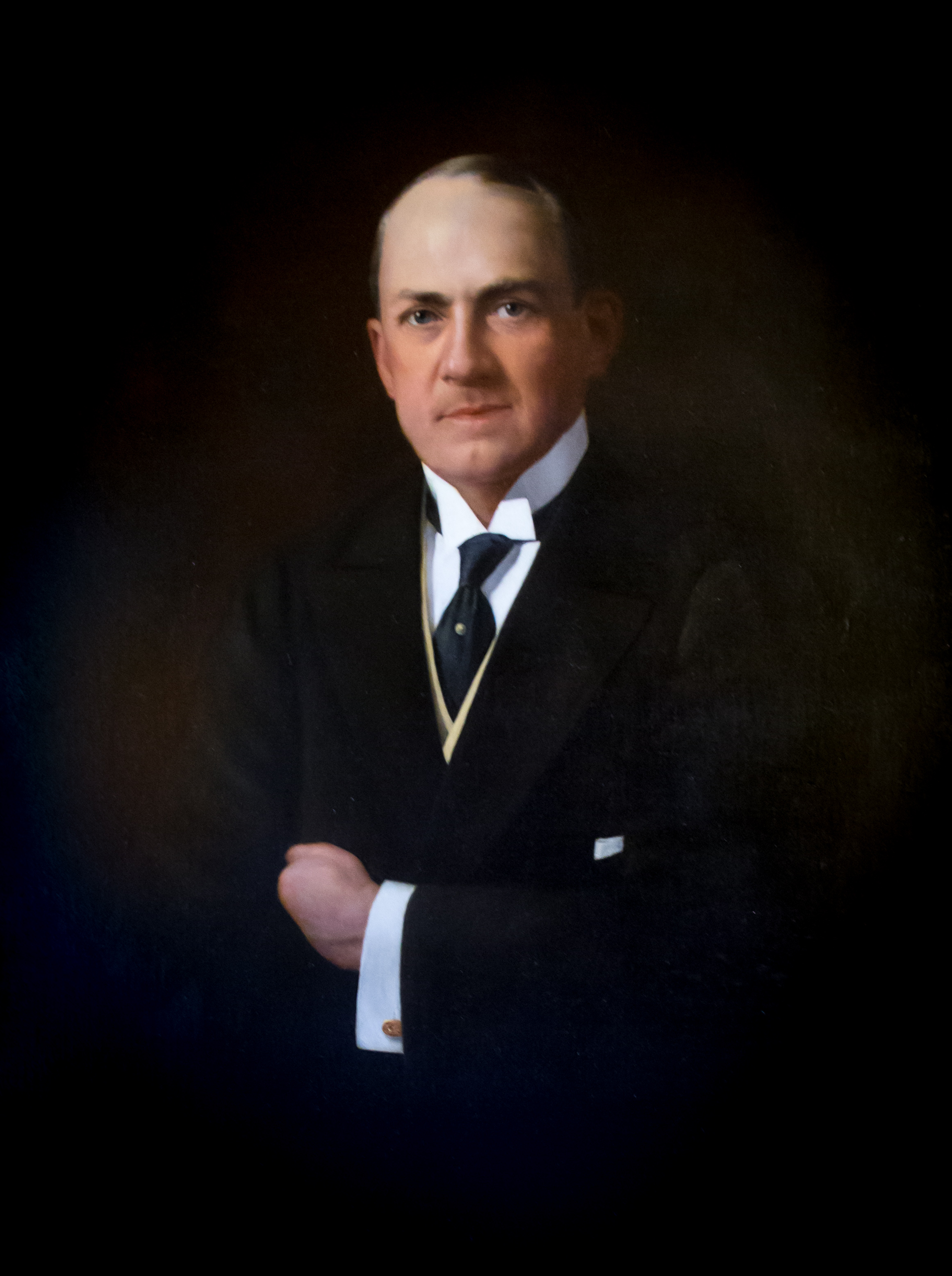
- Turned pro: 1884 (amateur tour)
- Retired: 1890

Singles
- Career record: 30–8
- Career titles: 5

Grand Slam singles results
- US Open: F (1886^{Ch})

Robert Livingston Beeckman (April 15, 1866 – January 21, 1935) was an American stockbroker, sportsman, and politician who served as the 52nd governor of Rhode Island.

== Early life ==
Beeckman was born on April 15, 1866, in New York City, New York. He was the son of Gilbert Livingston Beeckman and Margaret Atherton (née Foster) Beeckman. His sister, Katherine Livingston Beeckman, was married to Louis Lasher Lorillard, the son of Pierre Lorillard III, and another sister, Martha Beeckman, was married to New York banker Amos Tuck French. His family ancestry can be traced back to Dutch settlers of New Amsterdam dating to 1654. His ancestors include Robert Livingston the Elder, Declaration signer Philip Livingston and "The Chancellor" Robert Livingston.

His family owned the financial firm Lapsley Beeckman & Co. When Beeckman was young, his family moved to Newport, Rhode Island. He left school at the age of sixteen to become a stockbroker.

== Career ==
At the age of 16, Beeckman began his career at a stock brokerage firm in New York. At age 21, Beeckman became one of the youngest ever members of the New York Stock Exchange, being a member from 1887 until 1906. By 1916, he retired from the brokerage business. After this time, he was a member of the board of directors of several corporations, including the Industrial Trust Company, the Newport Trust Company, the International Silver Company, and the Newport Casino.

=== Sportsman ===
Beeckman was also a prominent polo player and tennis player. He played in the finals of the 1886 United States National Tennis Championships, which took place in Newport. He lost to defending champion Richard Sears with the score was 4–6, 6–1, 6–3, 6–4.

=== Political career ===
Beeckman's first political office was a Rhode Island state Representative in the General Assembly from Newport, from 1908 to 1912. At the time, Beeckman said "he was entering active politics because he believed it to be his duty. He felt the time had come for the step, which he had weighed carefully before accepting the responsibilities the office would incur." He was a state Senator from 1912 to 1914, until his election

Elected as the governor of Rhode Island in 1914, he held the office for three terms from January 5, 1915, to January 4, 1921. During his administration, Beeckman pushed for reforms in State institutions including hospitals, prisons, and insane asylums, established an inheritance tax, and established a state Parole Board. Beeckman advocated for removing the property qualification for Rhode Island voters.

He was the governor during the First World War. In formally greeting Marshall Joffre in Boston alongside other New England governors, Beeckman "expressed the hope that France might find in American the same comfort and help that this country [the United States] found in France in the dark days of the Revolution." He visited Rhode Island troops on the battlefield in France and pushed for state appropriations to provide for dependent families of servicemen.

Beeckman was governor during the Spanish flu pandemic, which struck the state in early September 1918. Acting on the advice of superintendent of health Charles V. Chapin, Beeckman delayed issuing a closure order until October 6. The peak of the pandemic occurred October 3–9, with over 6,700 cases reported. Beeckman lifted the closure order on October 25. A second, smaller wave hit Rhode Island schools in January, and the flu was declared eradicated in Rhode Island in February 1919.

A close friend of then Ohio Senator Warren G. Harding, he was mentioned as a possible vice presidential candidate in 1920, but ultimately Calvin Coolidge was selected and became president upon Harding's death in 1923.

After stepping down from the governorship, he unsuccessfully ran in 1922 to represent Rhode Island in the United States Senate, losing to the incumbent Democratic senator, Peter Goelet Gerry. During the campaign, it was alleged that Beeckman and his campaign manager, J. Henry Reuter, attempted to bribe Herve J. Lagage with $1,500. Beeckman admitted to the payment, but "insist[ed] that it was their understanding that Lagace had agreed to work for Beeckman and that the money paid to him was to be used for legitimate expenses of the campaign."

== Personal life ==
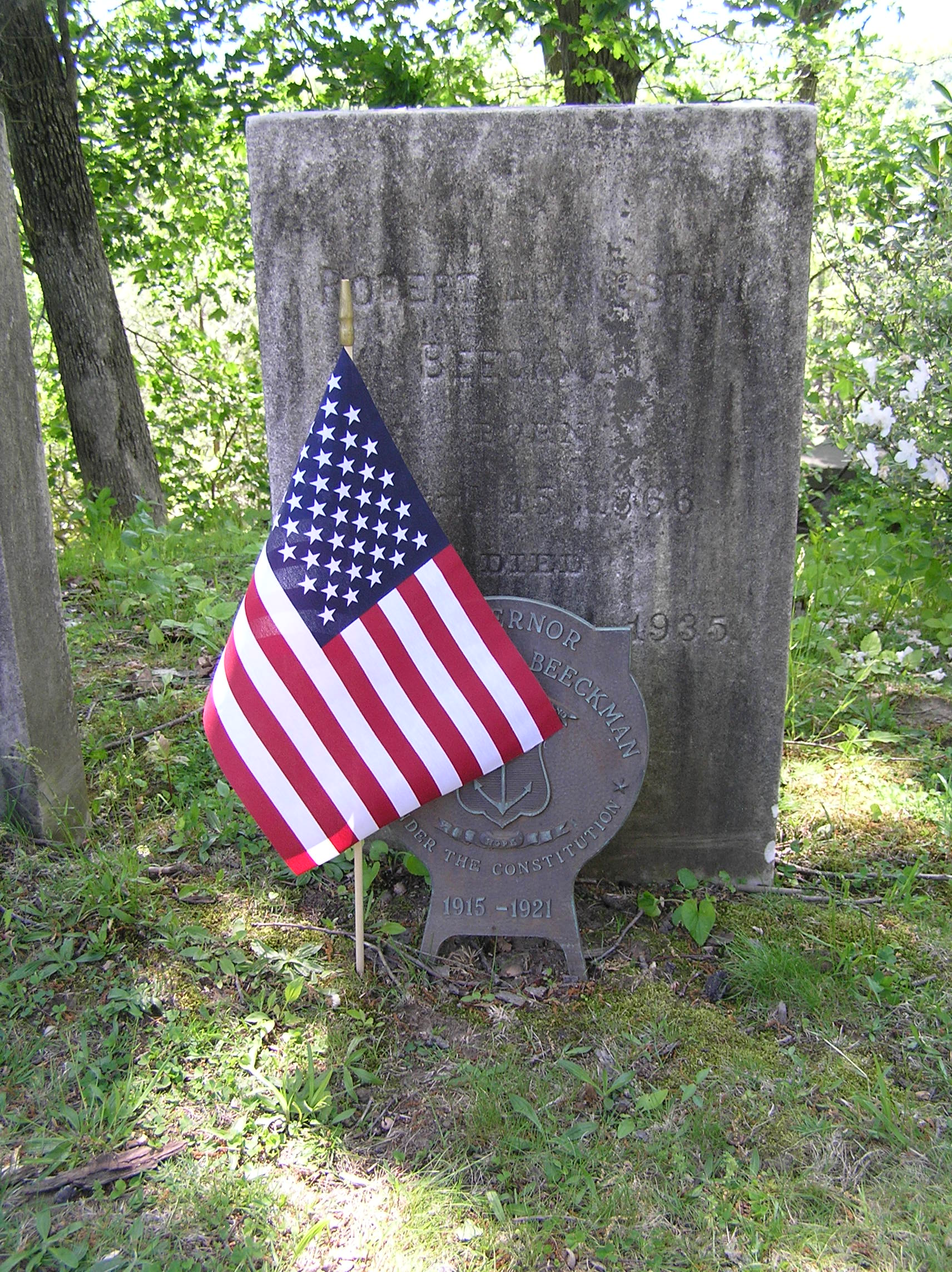
The gravesite of Robert Livingston Beeckman

Beeckman was married first to Eleanor Thomas of Zanesville, Ohio, in 1902. She was the daughter of Gen. Samuel Russell Thomas and Ann Augusta (née Porter) Thomas and the sister of Edward Russell Thomas. Upon her father's death in 1903, she inherited the income from half of his $10,000,000 estate.

After his first wife's death in 1920, he remarried Edna (née Marston) Burke at Bar Harbor, Maine, in September 1923. Edna, who was divorced from Oscar Meech Burke, was the daughter of Edwin Sprague Marston, the former president and chairman of the board of directors of the Farmers' Loan & Trust Company (predecessor firm of Citigroup), and Emma Bennett (née Doty) Marston. He had no children. He was an active member of the Freemasons.

In 1911, while staying at the Ritz Hotel in Paris during a tour of France, "a drunken man" lurched in front of Beeckman and his wife's automobile. "The drunken man in the roadway was killed on the spot," Beeckman broke his arm and cut his head, and despite being thrown ten feet from the car, his wife was not injured. In 1912, it was reported that "R. Livingston Beeckman, who has survived more railroad, polo, and yachting accidents than any other member of Newport society," was in a railroad accident in Sulphur Springs which he escaped without serious injury.

He died on January 21, 1935, at his winter home in Santa Barbara, California, of a heart attack. He was interred at Sleepy Hollow Cemetery in Sleepy Hollow, New York. After his death, his widow remarried to Archibald Gourley Thacher in 1937.

=== Residences ===
In 1903, Beeckman purchased the former home of Wallace C. Andrews at 854 Fifth Avenue between 66th and 67th Streets for $325,000. He hired architects Warren & Wetmore to build him a six-story Beaux-Arts residence which was completed in 1905. They owned the home until 1912 when they decided to live full-time in Rhode Island and, after leasing it to Pittsburgh banker Benjamin Thaw Sr. for a number of years, the home was sold to George Grant Mason for $700,000. (Note: The home was later sold to Emily Thorn Vanderbilt and her second husband, Ambassador Henry White, in 1925. Today, Beeckman's extant 1905 home serves as the Mission of Serbia and Montenegro, who listed the home for sale for $50,000,000.)

The Beeckman's also owned a winter home in Providence, Rhode Island, which was damaged by a fire in January 1912. Their Newport estate, known as Lands End, was also damaged by a fire in September 1912.

From 1913 to 1921, Beeckman leased 13 Brown Street, the Providence winter home of industrialist and Republican party supporter Alfred M. Coats, which served as the Rhode Island executive mansion while Beeckman was in office as governor.

He later became a winter resident of Santa Barbara, California, where he rented the home of Arthur Meeker, although he was renting the Edward Ryerson house at the time of his death.

Party political offices
Preceded by Aram J. Pothier	Republican nominee for Governor of Rhode Island; 1914, 1916, 1918	Succeeded by Emery J. San Souci
Preceded by Henry F. Lippitt	Republican nominee for U.S. Senator from Rhode Island (Class 1); 1922	Succeeded by Felix Hebert
Political offices
Preceded by Aram J. Pothier	Governor of Rhode Island; 1915-1921	Succeeded by Emery J. San Souci
