= Joseph Sill Clark Sr. =

American tennis player

Joseph Clark
- Full name: Joseph Sill Clark
- Country (sports): United States
- Born: November 30, 1861 Germantown, Philadelphia
- Died: April 14, 1956 (aged 94) Chestnut Hill, Philadelphia
- Turned pro: 1882 (amateur tour)
- Retired: 1893
- Int. Tennis HoF: 1955 (member page)

Singles
- Career record: 55/23 (70.5%)
- Career titles: 6

Grand Slam singles results
- US Open: SF (1885, 1886, 1887)

Joseph Sill Clark Sr.
- Parent: Edward White Clark
- Relatives: Clarence Munroe Clark, brother Enoch White Clark, grandfather

Joseph Sill Clark Sr. (November 30, 1861 – April 14, 1956) was an American tennis player. Clark won the 1885 U.S. National Championship in doubles with partner Dick Sears. He and his brother Clarence Clark were the first Americans to play Centre Court at Wimbledon. He was also the inaugural singles and doubles national collegiate champion, in 1883. When he died in 1956, he was Philadelphia's oldest practicing attorney.

== Biography ==
Clark was born in Germantown, Philadelphia, Pennsylvania, on November 30, 1861, to a family of bankers and financiers. His father, Edward White Clark, was a partner in the family firm, E. W. Clark & Co. Clark's brother, Clarence Munroe Clark, would also become a tennis player of note. He was a member of the Young America Cricket Club with his brother Clarence and Frederick Winslow Taylor where they all became interested in tennis. In 1878, the Clark brothers built a tennis court on their father's property and Frederick Winslow Taylor built a court on his family's property where they all played tennis together frequently.

As a student at Harvard University, Clark won the U.S. intercollegiate singles and doubles titles in its inaugural staging, in the spring of 1883. In the singles, he defeated fellow Crimson player Dick Sears.

Clark graduated Harvard in 1883 and later earned a law degree. He and his brother, Percy Hamilton Clark, opened a law practice at 321 Chestnut Street in Philadelphia. The practice centered on the "street railway, electric light, and power businesses" operated by E. W. Clark & Co.

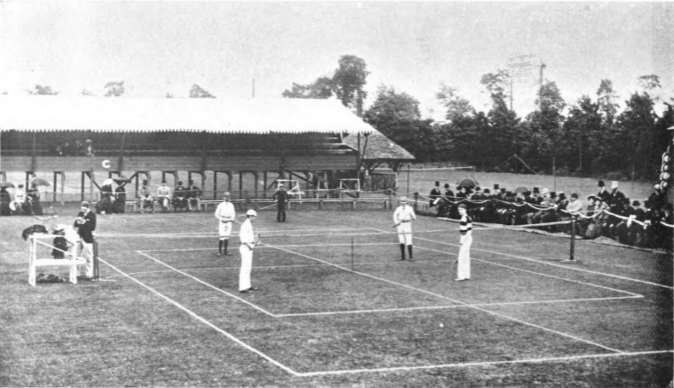
Joseph and his brother Clarence were the first Americans to play at Centre Court of Wimbledon

In 1883, Joseph and his brother Clark competed in doubles at Wimbledon against Ernest Renshaw and William Renshaw. The Clark brothers were the first Americans to play at Centre Court.

In 1885, he took the U.S. National lawn tennis doubles title, and also became champion of Canada, the first American to be so. Clark was also a semi-finalist at the U.S. National Championships lawn tennis singles in 1885, 1886, the same year he also won men's Mosseley Challenge Cup at the Bar Harbor Open, and 1887. In 1886 he won the Wentworth Invitation.In 1887 he the singles title at the Lenox Invitation in New York. He captured the unofficial 1887 and 1887 U.S. National mixed doubles championships with L. Stokes and Marian Wright (fr), respectively

He served as president of the United States National Lawn Tennis Association from 1889 until 1891.

On November 26, 1896, Clark married Kate Richardson Avery (1868-1951), whose family owned Avery Island in Louisiana. She was the daughter of Dudley Avery (1810-1879), who was the brother-in-law of Tabasco sauce inventor Edmund McIlhenny (1815-1890).

Their children included two sons: future Philadelphia mayor and U.S. Senator Joseph Sill Clark Jr. and Avery B. Clark. They had at least three grandchildren: Joseph Jr.'s children Joseph S. Clark III and Noel (née Clark) Miller, and Avery's daughter Kate Avery Clark.

In 1955, Clark was inaugurated into the International Tennis Hall of Fame.

Clark died April 14, 1956, in Chestnut Hill, Philadelphia, Pennsylvania.
