= List of Grand Slam men's singles finals =

This is a list of all the men's Grand Slam singles finals in tennis. From the 1877 Wimbledon Championship up to and including the 2026 Wimbledon Championship.
There has been 495 finals contested between 277 different men, with 154 champions emerging.

== Chronological list ==
☆ Player's first Grand Slam title.
† Player's only Grand Slam final.
‡ Player's only Grand Slam title.

=== Amateur Era ===
Year	Championship	Champion	Runner-up	Score				
Year	Championship	Champion	Runner-up	Set 1	Set 2	Set 3	Set 4	Set 5
1877	Wimbledon	(United Kingdom) Spencer Gore^{☆‡}	(United Kingdom) William Marshall^{†}	6–1	6–2	6–4		
1878	Wimbledon	(United Kingdom) Frank Hadow^{☆†‡}	(United Kingdom) Spencer Gore	7–5	6–1	9–7		
1879	Wimbledon	(United Kingdom) John Hartley^{☆}	(United Kingdom) Vere St. Leger Goold^{†}	6–2	6–4	6–2		
1880	Wimbledon	(United Kingdom) John Hartley	(United Kingdom) Herbert Lawford	6–3	6–2	2–6	6–3	
1881	Wimbledon	(United Kingdom) William Renshaw^{☆}	(United Kingdom) John Hartley	6–0	6–1	6–1		
1881	U.S. National	(United States) Richard Sears^{☆}	(United Kingdom) William Glyn^{†}	6–0	6–3	6–2		
1882	Wimbledon	(United Kingdom) William Renshaw	(United Kingdom) Ernest Renshaw	6–1	2–6	4–6	6–2	6–2
1882	U.S. National	(United States) Richard Sears	(United States) Clarence Clark^{†}	6–1	6–4	6–0		
1883	Wimbledon	(United Kingdom) William Renshaw	(United Kingdom) Ernest Renshaw	2–6	6–3	6–3	4–6	6–3
1883	U.S. National	(United States) Richard Sears	(United States) James Dwight^{†}	6–2	6–0	9–7		
1884	Wimbledon	(United Kingdom) William Renshaw	(United Kingdom) Herbert Lawford	6–0	6–4	9–7		
1884	U.S. National	(United States) Richard Sears	(United States) Howard Taylor	6–0	1–6	6–0	6–2	
1885	Wimbledon	(United Kingdom) William Renshaw	(United Kingdom) Herbert Lawford	7–5	6–2	4–6	7–5	
1885	U.S. National	(United States) Richard Sears	(United States) Godfrey Brinley^{†}	6–3	4–6	6–0	6–3	
1886	Wimbledon	(United Kingdom) William Renshaw	(United Kingdom) Herbert Lawford	6–0	5–7	6–3	6–4	
1886	U.S. National	(United States) Richard Sears	(United States) Robert Livingston Beeckman^{†}	4–6	6–1	6–3	6–4	
1887	Wimbledon	(United Kingdom) Herbert Lawford^{☆‡}	(United Kingdom) Ernest Renshaw	6–2	6–3	2–6	4–6	6–4
1887	U.S. National	(United States) Richard Sears	(United States) Henry Slocum	6–1	6–3	6–2		
1888	Wimbledon	(United Kingdom) Ernest Renshaw^{☆‡}	(United Kingdom) Herbert Lawford	6–3	7–5	6–0		
1888	U.S. National	(United States) Henry Slocum^{☆}	(United States) Howard Taylor	6–4	6–1	6–0		
1889	Wimbledon	(United Kingdom) William Renshaw	(United Kingdom) Ernest Renshaw	6–4	6–1	3–6	6–0	
1889	U.S. National	(United States) Henry Slocum	(United States) Quincy Shaw^{†}	6–3	6–1	4–6	6–2	
1890	Wimbledon	(United Kingdom) Willoughby Hamilton^{☆†‡}	(United Kingdom) William Renshaw	6–8	6–2	3–6	6–1	6–1
1890	U.S. National	(United States) Oliver Campbell^{☆}	(United States) Henry Slocum	6–2	4–6	6–3	6–1	
1891	Wimbledon	(United Kingdom) Wilfred Baddeley^{☆}	(United Kingdom) Joshua Pim	6–4	1–6	7–5	6–0	
1891	U.S. National	(United States) Oliver Campbell	(United States) Clarence Hobart^{†}	2–6	7–5	7–9	6–1	6–2
1892	Wimbledon	(United Kingdom) Wilfred Baddeley	(United Kingdom) Joshua Pim	4–6	6–3	6–3	6–2	
1892	U.S. National	(United States) Oliver Campbell	(United States) Fred Hovey	7–5	3–6	6–3	7–5	
1893	Wimbledon	(United Kingdom) Joshua Pim^{☆}	(United Kingdom) Wilfred Baddeley	3–6	6–1	6–3	6–2	
1893	U.S. National	(United States) Robert Wrenn^{☆}	(United States) Fred Hovey	6–4	3–6	6–4	6–4	
1894	Wimbledon	(United Kingdom) Joshua Pim	(United Kingdom) Wilfred Baddeley	10–8	6–2	8–6		
1894	U.S. National	(United States) Robert Wrenn	(United Kingdom) Manliff Goodbody^{†}	6–8	6–1	6–4	6–4	
1895	Wimbledon	(United Kingdom) Wilfred Baddeley	(United Kingdom) Wilberforce Eaves	4–6	2–6	8–6	6–2	6–3
1895	U.S. National	(United States) Fred Hovey^{☆‡}	(United States) Robert Wrenn	6–3	6–2	6–4		
1896	Wimbledon	(United Kingdom) Harold Mahony^{☆‡}	(United Kingdom) Wilfred Baddeley	6–2	6–8	5–7	8–6	6–3
1896	U.S. National	(United States) Robert Wrenn	(United States) Fred Hovey	7–5	3–6	6–0	1–6	6–1
1897	Wimbledon	(United Kingdom) Reginald Doherty^{☆}	(United Kingdom) Harold Mahony	6–4	6–4	6–3		
1897	U.S. National	(United States) Robert Wrenn	(United Kingdom) Wilberforce Eaves	4–6	8–6	6–3	2–6	6–2
1898	Wimbledon	(United Kingdom) Reginald Doherty	(United Kingdom) Laurence Doherty	6–3	6–3	2–6	5–7	6–1
1898	U.S. National	(United States) Malcolm Whitman^{☆}	(United States) Dwight F. Davis^{†}	3–6	6–2	6–2	6–1	
1899	Wimbledon	(United Kingdom) Reginald Doherty	(United Kingdom) Arthur Gore	3–6	6–1	6–2	6–4	
1899	U.S. National	(United States) Malcolm Whitman	(United States) Jahial Parmly Paret^{†}	6–1	6–2	3–6	7–5	
1900	Wimbledon	(United Kingdom) Reginald Doherty	(United Kingdom) Sidney Smith^{†}	6–4	4–6	6–2	6–1	
1900	U.S. National	(United States) Malcolm Whitman	(United States) William Larned	6–4	1–6	6–2	6–2	
1901	Wimbledon	(United Kingdom) Arthur Gore^{☆}	(United Kingdom) Reginald Doherty	6–4	6–0	6–3		
1901	U.S. National	(United States) William Larned^{☆}	(United States) Beals Wright	6–2	6–8	6–4	6–4	
1902	Wimbledon	(United Kingdom) Laurence Doherty^{☆}	(United Kingdom) Arthur Gore	8–6	6–3	7–5		
1902	U.S. National	(United States) William Larned	(United Kingdom) Reginald Doherty	4–6	6–2	6–4	8–6	
1903	Wimbledon	(United Kingdom) Laurence Doherty	(United Kingdom) Frank Riseley	1–6	6–3	8–6	13–11	
1903	U.S. National	(United Kingdom) Laurence Doherty	(United States) William Larned	6–0	6–3	10–8		
1904	Wimbledon	(United Kingdom) Laurence Doherty	(United Kingdom) Frank Riseley	6–0	6–1	6–2		
1904	U.S. National	(United States) Holcombe Ward^{☆‡}	(United States) William Clothier	10–8	6–4	9–7		
1905	Australasian	(Australia) Rodney Heath^{☆}	(Australia) Albert Curtis^{†}	4–6	6–3	6–4	6–4	
1905	Wimbledon	(United Kingdom) Laurence Doherty	(Australia) Norman Brookes	1–6	6–4	6–1	1–6	7–5
1905	U.S. National	(United States) Beals Wright^{☆‡}	(United States) Holcombe Ward	6–2	6–1	11–9		
1906	Australasian	(New Zealand) Anthony Wilding^{☆}	(New Zealand) Harry Parker	6–0	6–4	6–4		
1906	Wimbledon	(United Kingdom) Laurence Doherty	(United Kingdom) Frank Riseley	6–3	6–3	6–4		
1906	U.S. National	(United States) William Clothier^{☆‡}	(United States) Beals Wright	6–3	6–0	6–4		
1907	Australasian	(Australia) Horace Rice^{☆‡}	(New Zealand) Harry Parker	6–3	6–4	6–4		
1907	Wimbledon	(Australia) Norman Brookes^{☆}	(United Kingdom) Arthur Gore	6–4	6–2	6–2		
1907	U.S. National	(United States) William Larned	(United States) Robert LeRoy^{†}	6–2	6–2	6–4		
1908	Australasian	(United States) Fred Alexander^{☆†‡}	(Australia) Alfred Dunlop^{†}	3–6	3–6	6–0	6–2	6–3
1908	Wimbledon	(United Kingdom) Arthur Gore	(United Kingdom) Herbert Roper Barrett	6–3	6–2	4–6	3–6	6–4
1908	U.S. National	(United States) William Larned	(United States) Beals Wright	6–1	6–2	8–6		
1909	Australasian	(New Zealand) Anthony Wilding	(Australia) Ernie Parker	6–1	7–5	6–2		
1909	Wimbledon	(United Kingdom) Arthur Gore	(United Kingdom) Major Ritchie^{†}	6–2	6–3	4–6	6–4	
1909	U.S. National	(United States) William Larned	(United States) William Clothier	6–1	6–2	5–7	1–6	6–1
1910	Australasian	(Australia) Rodney Heath	(Australia) Horace Rice	6–4	6–3	6–2		
1910	Wimbledon	(New Zealand) Anthony Wilding	(United Kingdom) Arthur Gore	4–6	4–6	6–3	6–2	6–3
1910	U.S. National	(United States) William Larned	(United States) Tom Bundy^{†}	6–1	5–7	6–0	6–8	6–1
1911	Australasian	(Australia) Norman Brookes	(Australia) Horace Rice	6–1	6–2	6–3		
1911	Wimbledon	(New Zealand) Anthony Wilding	(United Kingdom) Herbert Roper Barrett	5–7	4–6	6–4	6–3	6–1
1911	U.S. National	(United States) William Larned	(United States) Maurice McLoughlin	6–4	6–4	6–2		
1912	Australasian	(United Kingdom) James Cecil Parke^{☆†‡}	(United Kingdom) Alfred Beamish^{†}	3–6	6–3	1–6	6–1	7–5
1912	Wimbledon	(New Zealand) Anthony Wilding	(United Kingdom) Arthur Gore	9–7	2–6	7–5	6–1	
1912	U.S. National	(United States) Maurice McLoughlin^{☆}	(United States) Wallace F. Johnson^{†}	3–6	2–6	6–2	6–4	6–2
1913	Australasian	(Australia) Ernie Parker^{☆‡}	(New Zealand) Harry Parker	2–6	6–1	6–3	6–2	
1913	Wimbledon	(New Zealand) Anthony Wilding	(United States) Maurice McLoughlin	6–3	6–4	7–5		
1913	U.S. National	(United States) Maurice McLoughlin	(United States) R. Norris Williams	6–4	5–7	6–3	6–1	
1914	Australasian	(Australia) Arthur O'Hara Wood^{☆†‡}	(Australia) Gerald Patterson	6–4	6–3	5–7	6–1	
1914	Wimbledon	(Australia) Norman Brookes	(New Zealand) Anthony Wilding	6–2	6–1	5–7	4–6	8–6
1914	U.S. National	(United States) R. Norris Williams^{☆}	(United States) Maurice McLoughlin	6–3	8–6	10–8		
1915	Australasian	(United Kingdom) Gordon Lowe^{☆†‡}	(Australia) Horace Rice	4–6	6–1	6–1	6–4	
1915	U.S. National	(United States) Bill Johnston^{☆}	(United States) Maurice McLoughlin	1–6	6–0	7–5	10–8	
1916	U.S. National	(United States) R. Norris Williams	(United States) Bill Johnston	4–6	6–4	0–6	6–2	6–4
1917	U.S. National	(United States) Robert Lindley Murray^{☆}	(United States) Nathaniel Niles^{†}	5–7	8–6	6–3	6–3	
1918	U.S. National	(United States) Robert Lindley Murray	(United States) Bill Tilden	6–3	6–1	7–5		
1919	Australasian	(United Kingdom) Algernon Kingscote^{☆†‡}	(Australia) Eric Pockley^{†}	6–4	6–0	6–3		
1919	Wimbledon	(Australia) Gerald Patterson^{☆}	(Australia) Norman Brookes	6–2	6–1	6–3		
1919	U.S. National	(United States) Bill Johnston	(United States) Bill Tilden	6–4	6–4	6–3		
1920	Australasian	(Australia) Pat O'Hara Wood^{☆}	(Australia) Ronald Thomas^{†}	6–3	4–6	6–8	6–1	6–3
1920	Wimbledon	(United States) Bill Tilden^{☆}	(Australia) Gerald Patterson	6–4	6–4	13–11		
1920	U.S. National	(United States) Bill Tilden	(United States) Bill Johnston	6–1	1–6	7–5	5–7	6–3
1921	Australasian	(Australia) Rice Gemmell^{☆†‡}	(Australia) Alf Hedeman^{†}	7–5	6–1	6–4		
1921	Wimbledon	(United States) Bill Tilden	(South Africa) Brian Norton^{†}	5–7	4–6	7–5	6–3	6–3
1921	U.S. National	(United States) Bill Tilden	(United States) Bill Johnston	6–1	6–3	6–1		
1922	Australasian	(Australia) James Anderson^{☆}	(Australia) Gerald Patterson	6–0	3–6	3–6	6–3	6–2
1922	Wimbledon	(Australia) Gerald Patterson	(United Kingdom) Randolph Lycett^{†}	6–3	6–4	6–2		
1922	U.S. National	(United States) Bill Tilden	(United States) Bill Johnston	4–6	3–6	6–2	6–3	6–4
1923	Australasian	(Australia) Pat O'Hara Wood	(Australia) Bert St. John^{†}	6–1	6–1	6–3		
1923	Wimbledon	(United States) Bill Johnston	(United States) Francis Hunter	6–0	6–3	6–1		
1923	U.S. National	(United States) Bill Tilden	(United States) Bill Johnston	6–4	6–1	6–4		
1924	Australasian	(Australia) James Anderson	(Australia) Richard Schlesinger	6–3	6–4	3–6	5–7	6–3
1924	Wimbledon	(France) Jean Borotra^{☆}	(France) René Lacoste	6–1	3–6	6–1	3–6	6–4
1924	U.S. National	(United States) Bill Tilden	(United States) Bill Johnston	6–1	9–7	6–2		
1925	Australasian	(Australia) James Anderson	(Australia) Gerald Patterson	11–9	2–6	6–2	6–3	
1925	French	(France) René Lacoste^{☆}	(France) Jean Borotra	7–5	6–1	6–4		
1925	Wimbledon	(France) René Lacoste	(France) Jean Borotra	6–3	6–3	4–6	8–6	
1925	U.S. National	(United States) Bill Tilden	(United States) Bill Johnston	4–6	11–9	6–3	4–6	6–3
1926	Australasian	(Australia) John Hawkes^{☆‡}	(Australia) James Willard^{†}	6–1	6–3	6–1		
1926	French	(France) Henri Cochet^{☆}	(France) René Lacoste	6–2	6–4	6–3		
1926	Wimbledon	(France) Jean Borotra	(United States) Howard Kinsey^{†}	8–6	6–1	6–3		
1926	U.S. National	(France) René Lacoste	(France) Jean Borotra	6–4	6–0	6–4		
1927	Australian	(Australia) Gerald Patterson	(Australia) John Hawkes	3–6	6–4	3–6	18–16	6–3
1927	French	(France) René Lacoste	(United States) Bill Tilden	6–4	4–6	5–7	6–3	11–9
1927	Wimbledon	(France) Henri Cochet	(France) Jean Borotra	4–6	4–6	6–3	6–4	7–5
1927	U.S. National	(France) René Lacoste	(United States) Bill Tilden	11–9	6–3	11–9		
1928	Australian	(France) Jean Borotra	(Australia) Jack Cummings^{†}	6–4	6–1	4–6	5–7	6–3
1928	French	(France) Henri Cochet	(France) René Lacoste	5–7	6–3	6–1	6–3	
1928	Wimbledon	(France) René Lacoste	(France) Henri Cochet	6–1	4–6	6–4	6–2	
1928	U.S. National	(France) Henri Cochet	(United States) Francis Hunter	4–6	6–4	3–6	7–5	6–3
1929	Australian	(United Kingdom) John Gregory^{☆†‡}	(Australia) Richard Schlesinger	6–2	6–2	5–7	6–4	
1929	French	(France) René Lacoste	(France) Jean Borotra	6–3	2–6	6–0	2–6	8–6
1929	Wimbledon	(France) Henri Cochet	(France) Jean Borotra	6–4	6–3	6–4		
1929	U.S. National	(United States) Bill Tilden	(United States) Francis Hunter	3–6	6–3	4–6	6–2	6–4
1930	Australian	(Australia) Edgar Moon^{☆†‡}	(Australia) Harry Hopman	6–3	6–1	6–3		
1930	French	(France) Henri Cochet	(United States) Bill Tilden	3–6	8–6	6–3	6–1	
1930	Wimbledon	(United States) Bill Tilden	(United States) Wilmer Allison	6–3	9–7	6–4		
1930	U.S. National	(United States) John Doeg^{☆†‡}	(United States) Frank Shields	10–8	1–6	6–4	16–14	
1931	Australian	(Australia) Jack Crawford^{☆}	(Australia) Harry Hopman	6–4	6–2	2–6	6–1	
1931	French	(France) Jean Borotra	(France) Christian Boussus^{†}	2–6	6–4	7–5	6–4	
1931	Wimbledon	(United States) Sidney Wood^{☆‡}	(United States) Frank Shields	W/O				
1931	U.S. National	(United States) Ellsworth Vines^{☆}	(United States) George Lott^{†}	7–9	6–3	9–7	7–5	
1932	Australian	(Australia) Jack Crawford	(Australia) Harry Hopman	4–6	6–3	3–6	6–3	6–1
1932	French	(France) Henri Cochet	(Italy) Giorgo de Stefani^{†}	6–0	6–4	4–6	6–3	
1932	Wimbledon	(United States) Ellsworth Vines	(United Kingdom) Bunny Austin	6–4	6–2	6–0		
1932	U.S. National	(United States) Ellsworth Vines	(France) Henri Cochet	6–4	6–4	6–4		
1933	Australian	(Australia) Jack Crawford	(United States) Keith Gledhill^{†}	2–6	7–5	6–3	6–2	
1933	French	(Australia) Jack Crawford	(France) Henri Cochet	8–6	6–1	6–3		
1933	Wimbledon	(Australia) Jack Crawford	(United States) Ellsworth Vines	4–6	11–9	6–2	2–6	6–4
1933	U.S. National	(United Kingdom) Fred Perry^{☆}	(Australia) Jack Crawford	6–3	11–13	4–6	6–0	6–1
1934	Australian	(United Kingdom) Fred Perry	(Australia) Jack Crawford	6–3	7–5	6–1		
1934	French	(Germany) Gottfried von Cramm^{☆}	(Australia) Jack Crawford	6–4	7–9	3–6	7–5	6–3
1934	Wimbledon	(United Kingdom) Fred Perry	(Australia) Jack Crawford	6–3	6–0	7–5		
1934	U.S. National	(United Kingdom) Fred Perry	(United States) Wilmer Allison	6–4	6–3	3–6	1–6	8–6
1935	Australian	(Australia) Jack Crawford	(United Kingdom) Fred Perry	2–6	6–4	6–4	6–4	
1935	French	(United Kingdom) Fred Perry	(Germany) Gottfried von Cramm	6–3	3–6	6–1	6–3	
1935	Wimbledon	(United Kingdom) Fred Perry	(Germany) Gottfried von Cramm	6–2	6–4	6–4		
1935	U.S. National	(United States) Wilmer Allison^{☆‡}	(United States) Sidney Wood	6–2	6–2	6–3		
1936	Australian	(Australia) Adrian Quist^{☆}	(Australia) Jack Crawford	6–2	6–3	4–6	3–6	9–7
1936	French	(Germany) Gottfried von Cramm	(United Kingdom) Fred Perry	6–0	2–6	6–2	2–6	6–0
1936	Wimbledon	(United Kingdom) Fred Perry	(Germany) Gottfried von Cramm	6–1	6–1	6–0		
1936	U.S. National	(United Kingdom) Fred Perry	(United States) Don Budge	2–6	6–2	8–6	1–6	10–8
1937	Australian	(Australia) Vivian McGrath^{☆†‡}	(Australia) John Bromwich	6–3	1–6	6–0	2–6	6–1
1937	French	(Germany) Henner Henkel^{☆†‡}	(United Kingdom) Bunny Austin	6–1	6–4	6–3		
1937	Wimbledon	(United States) Don Budge^{☆}	(Germany) Gottfried von Cramm	6–3	6–4	6–2		
1937	U.S. National	(United States) Don Budge	(Germany) Gottfried von Cramm	6–1	7–9	6–1	3–6	6–1
1938	Australian	(United States) Don Budge	(Australia) John Bromwich	6–4	6–2	6–1		
1938	French	(United States) Don Budge	(Czechoslovakia) Roderich Menzel^{†}	6–3	6–2	6–4		
1938	Wimbledon	(United States) Don Budge	(United Kingdom) Bunny Austin	6–1	6–0	6–3		
1938	U.S. National	(United States) Don Budge	(United States) Gene Mako^{†}	6–3	6–8	6–2	6–1	
1939	Australian	(Australia) John Bromwich^{☆}	(Australia) Adrian Quist	6–4	6–1	6–2		
1939	French	(United States) Don McNeill^{☆}	(United States) Bobby Riggs	7–5	6–0	6–3		
1939	Wimbledon	(United States) Bobby Riggs^{☆}	(United States) Elwood Cooke^{†}	2–6	8–6	3–6	6–3	6–2
1939	U.S. National	(United States) Bobby Riggs	(United States) Welby van Horn^{†}	6–4	6–2	6–4		
1940	Australian	(Australia) Adrian Quist	(Australia) Jack Crawford	6–3	6–1	6–2		
1940	U.S. National	(United States) Don McNeill	(United States) Bobby Riggs	4–6	6–8	6–3	6–3	7–5
1941	U.S. National	(United States) Bobby Riggs	(United States) Frank Kovacs^{†}	5–7	6–1	6–3	6–3	
1942	U.S. National	(United States) Ted Schroeder^{☆}	(United States) Frank Parker	8–6	7–5	3–6	4–6	6–2
1943	U.S. National	(United States) Joseph Hunt^{☆†‡}	(United States) Jack Kramer	6–3	6–8	10–8	6–0	
1944	U.S. National	(United States) Frank Parker^{☆}	(United States) Bill Talbert	6–4	3–6	6–3	6–3	
1945	U.S. National	(United States) Frank Parker	(United States) Bill Talbert	14–12	6–1	6–2		
1946	Australian	(Australia) John Bromwich	(Australia) Dinny Pails	5–7	6–3	7–5	3–6	6–2
1946	French	(France) Marcel Bernard^{☆†‡}	(Czechoslovakia) Jaroslav Drobný	3–6	2–6	6–1	6–4	6–3
1946	Wimbledon	(France) Yvon Petra^{☆†‡}	(Australia) Geoff Brown^{†}	6–2	6–4	7–9	5–7	6–4
1946	U.S. National	(United States) Jack Kramer^{☆}	(United States) Tom Brown	9–7	6–3	6–0		
1947	Australian	(Australia) Dinny Pails^{☆‡}	(Australia) John Bromwich	4–6	6–4	3–6	7–5	8–6
1947	French	(Hungary) József Asbóth^{☆†‡}	(South Africa) Eric Sturgess	8–6	7–5	6–4		
1947	Wimbledon	(United States) Jack Kramer	(United States) Tom Brown	6–1	6–3	6–2		
1947	U.S. National	(United States) Jack Kramer	(United States) Frank Parker	4–6	2–6	6–1	6–0	6–3
1948	Australian	(Australia) Adrian Quist	(Australia) John Bromwich	6–4	3–6	6–3	2–6	6–3
1948	French	(United States) Frank Parker	(Czechoslovakia) Jaroslav Drobný	6–4	7–5	5–7	8–6	
1948	Wimbledon	(United States) Bob Falkenburg^{☆†‡}	(Australia) John Bromwich	7–5	0–6	6–2	3–6	7–5
1948	U.S. National	(United States) Pancho Gonzales^{☆}	(South Africa) Eric Sturgess	6–2	6–3	14–12		
1949	Australian	(Australia) Frank Sedgman^{☆}	(Australia) John Bromwich	6–3	6–2	6–2		
1949	French	(United States) Frank Parker	(United States) Budge Patty	6–3	1–6	6–1	6–4	
1949	Wimbledon	(United States) Ted Schroeder	(Czechoslovakia) Jaroslav Drobný	3–6	6–0	6–3	4–6	6–4
1949	U.S. National	(United States) Pancho Gonzales	(United States) Ted Schroeder	16–18	2–6	6–1	6–2	6–4
1950	Australian	(Australia) Frank Sedgman	(Australia) Ken McGregor	6–3	6–4	4–6	6–1	
1950	French	(United States) Budge Patty^{☆}	(Egypt) Jaroslav Drobný	6–1	6–2	3–6	5–7	7–5
1950	Wimbledon	(United States) Budge Patty	(Australia) Frank Sedgman	6–1	8–10	6–2	6–3	
1950	U.S. National	(United States) Arthur Larsen^{☆‡}	(United States) Herbert Flam	6–3	4–6	5–7	6–4	6–3
1951	Australian	(United States) Dick Savitt^{☆}	(Australia) Ken McGregor	6–3	2–6	6–3	6–1	
1951	French	(Egypt) Jaroslav Drobný^{☆}	(South Africa) Eric Sturgess	6–3	6–3	6–3		
1951	Wimbledon	(United States) Dick Savitt	(Australia) Ken McGregor	6–4	6–4	6–4		
1951	U.S. National	(Australia) Frank Sedgman	(United States) Vic Seixas	6–4	6–1	6–1		
1952	Australian	(Australia) Ken McGregor^{☆‡}	(Australia) Frank Sedgman	7–5	12–10	2–6	6–2	
1952	French	(Egypt) Jaroslav Drobný	(Australia) Frank Sedgman	6–2	6–0	3–6	6–4	
1952	Wimbledon	(Australia) Frank Sedgman	(Egypt) Jaroslav Drobný	4–6	6–2	6–3	6–2	
1952	U.S. National	(Australia) Frank Sedgman	(United States) Gardnar Mulloy^{†}	6–1	6–2	6–3		
1953	Australian	(Australia) Ken Rosewall^{☆}	(Australia) Mervyn Rose	6–0	6–3	6–4		
1953	French	(Australia) Ken Rosewall	(United States) Vic Seixas	6–3	6–4	1–6	6–2	
1953	Wimbledon	(United States) Vic Seixas^{☆}	(Denmark) Kurt Nielsen	9–7	6–3	6–4		
1953	U.S. National	(United States) Tony Trabert^{☆}	(United States) Vic Seixas	6–3	6–2	6–3		
1954	Australian	(Australia) Mervyn Rose^{☆}	(Australia) Rex Hartwig	6–2	0–6	6–4	6–2	
1954	French	(United States) Tony Trabert	(United States) Arthur Larsen	6–4	7–5	6–1		
1954	Wimbledon	(Egypt) Jaroslav Drobný	(Australia) Ken Rosewall	13–11	4–6	6–2	9–7	
1954	U.S. National	(United States) Vic Seixas	(Australia) Rex Hartwig	3–6	6–2	6–4	6–4	
1955	Australian	(Australia) Ken Rosewall	(Australia) Lew Hoad	9–7	6–4	6–4		
1955	French	(United States) Tony Trabert	(Sweden) Sven Davidson	2–6	6–1	6–4	6–2	
1955	Wimbledon	(United States) Tony Trabert	(Denmark) Kurt Nielsen	6–3	7–5	6–1		
1955	U.S. National	(United States) Tony Trabert	(Australia) Ken Rosewall	9–7	6–3	6–3		
1956	Australian	(Australia) Lew Hoad^{☆}	(Australia) Ken Rosewall	6–4	3–6	6–4	7–5	
1956	French	(Australia) Lew Hoad	(Sweden) Sven Davidson	6–4	8–6	6–3		
1956	Wimbledon	(Australia) Lew Hoad	(Australia) Ken Rosewall	6–2	4–6	7–5	6–4	
1956	U.S. National	(Australia) Ken Rosewall	(Australia) Lew Hoad	4–6	6–2	6–3	6–3	
1957	Australian	(Australia) Ashley Cooper^{☆}	(Australia) Neale Fraser	6–3	9–11	6–4	6–2	
1957	French	(Sweden) Sven Davidson^{☆‡}	(United States) Herbert Flam	6–3	6–4	6–4		
1957	Wimbledon	(Australia) Lew Hoad	(Australia) Ashley Cooper	6–2	6–1	6–2		
1957	U.S. National	(Australia) Mal Anderson^{☆‡}	(Australia) Ashley Cooper	10–8	7–5	6–4		
1958	Australian	(Australia) Ashley Cooper	(Australia) Mal Anderson	7–5	6–3	6–4		
1958	French	(Australia) Mervyn Rose	(Chile) Luis Ayala	6–3	6–4	6–4		
1958	Wimbledon	(Australia) Ashley Cooper	(Australia) Neale Fraser	3–6	6–3	6–4	13–11	
1958	U.S. National	(Australia) Ashley Cooper	(Australia) Mal Anderson	6–2	3–6	4–6	10–8	8–6
1959	Australian	(United States) Alex Olmedo^{☆}	(Australia) Neale Fraser	6–1	6–2	3–6	6–3	
1959	French	(Italy) Nicola Pietrangeli^{☆}	(South Africa) Ian Vermaak^{†}	3–6	6–3	6–4	6–1	
1959	Wimbledon	(United States) Alex Olmedo	(Australia) Rod Laver	6–4	6–3	6–4		
1959	U.S. National	(Australia) Neale Fraser^{☆}	(United States) Alex Olmedo	6–3	5–7	6–2	6–4	
1960	Australian	(Australia) Rod Laver^{☆}	(Australia) Neale Fraser	5–7	3–6	6–3	8–6	8–6
1960	French	(Italy) Nicola Pietrangeli	(Chile) Luis Ayala	3–6	6–3	6–4	4–6	6–3
1960	Wimbledon	(Australia) Neale Fraser	(Australia) Rod Laver	6–4	3–6	9–7	7–5	
1960	U.S. National	(Australia) Neale Fraser	(Australia) Rod Laver	6–4	6–4	9–7		
1961	Australian	(Australia) Roy Emerson^{☆}	(Australia) Rod Laver	1–6	6–3	7–5	6–4	
1961	French	(Spain) Manuel Santana^{☆}	(Italy) Nicola Pietrangeli	4–6	6–1	3–6	6–0	6–2
1961	Wimbledon	(Australia) Rod Laver	(United States) Chuck McKinley	6–3	6–1	6–4		
1961	U.S. National	(Australia) Roy Emerson	(Australia) Rod Laver	7–5	6–3	6–2		
1962	Australian	(Australia) Rod Laver	(Australia) Roy Emerson	8–6	0–6	6–4	6–4	
1962	French	(Australia) Rod Laver	(Australia) Roy Emerson	3–6	2–6	6–3	9–7	6–2
1962	Wimbledon	(Australia) Rod Laver	(Australia) Martin Mulligan^{†}	6–2	6–2	6–1		
1962	U.S. National	(Australia) Rod Laver	(Australia) Roy Emerson	6–2	6–4	5–7	6–4	
1963	Australian	(Australia) Roy Emerson	(Australia) Ken Fletcher^{†}	6–3	6–3	6–1		
1963	French	(Australia) Roy Emerson	(France) Pierre Darmon^{†}	3–6	6–1	6–4	6–4	
1963	Wimbledon	(United States) Chuck McKinley^{☆‡}	(Australia) Fred Stolle	9–7	6–1	6–4		
1963	U.S. National	(Mexico) Rafael Osuna^{☆†‡}	(United States) Frank Froehling^{†}	7–5	6–4	6–2		
1964	Australian	(Australia) Roy Emerson	(Australia) Fred Stolle	6–3	6–4	6–2		
1964	French	(Spain) Manuel Santana	(Italy) Nicola Pietrangeli	6–3	6–1	4–6	7–5	
1964	Wimbledon	(Australia) Roy Emerson	(Australia) Fred Stolle	6–4	12–10	4–6	6–3	
1964	U.S. National	(Australia) Roy Emerson	(Australia) Fred Stolle	6–4	6–2	6–4		
1965	Australian	(Australia) Roy Emerson	(Australia) Fred Stolle	7–9	2–6	6–4	7–5	6–1
1965	French	(Australia) Fred Stolle^{☆}	(Australia) Tony Roche	3–6	6–0	6–2	6–3	
1965	Wimbledon	(Australia) Roy Emerson	(Australia) Fred Stolle	6–2	6–4	6–4		
1965	U.S. National	(Spain) Manuel Santana	(South Africa) Cliff Drysdale^{†}	6–2	7–9	7–5	6–1	
1966	Australian	(Australia) Roy Emerson	(United States) Arthur Ashe	6–4	6–8	6–2	6–3	
1966	French	(Australia) Tony Roche^{☆‡}	(Hungary) István Gulyás^{†}	6–1	6–4	7–5		
1966	Wimbledon	(Spain) Manuel Santana	(United States) Dennis Ralston^{†}	6–4	11–9	6–4		
1966	U.S. National	(Australia) Fred Stolle	(Australia) John Newcombe	4–6	12–10	6–3	6–4	
1967	Australian	(Australia) Roy Emerson	(United States) Arthur Ashe	6–4	6–1	6–4		
1967	French	(Australia) Roy Emerson	(Australia) Tony Roche	6–1	6–4	2–6	6–2	
1967	Wimbledon	(Australia) John Newcombe^{☆}	(West Germany) Wilhelm Bungert^{†}	6–3	6–1	6–1		
1967	U.S. National	(Australia) John Newcombe	(United States) Clark Graebner^{†}	6–4	6–4	8–6		
1968	Australian	(Australia) Bill Bowrey^{☆†‡}	(Spain) Juan Gisbert Sr.^{†}	7–5	2–6	9–7	6–4	

=== Open Era ===
Year	Championship	Champion	Runner-up	Score				
Year	Championship	Champion	Runner-up	Set 1	Set 2	Set 3	Set 4	Set 5
1968	French Open	(Australia) Ken Rosewall	(Australia) Rod Laver	6–3	6–1	2–6	6–2	
1968	Wimbledon	(Australia) Rod Laver	(Australia) Tony Roche	6–3	6–4	6–2		
1968	US Open	(United States) Arthur Ashe^{☆}	(Netherlands) Tom Okker^{†}	14–12	5–7	6–3	3–6	6–3
1969	Australian Open	(Australia) Rod Laver	(Spain) Andrés Gimeno	6–3	6–4	7–5		
1969	French Open	(Australia) Rod Laver	(Australia) Ken Rosewall	6–4	6–3	6–4		
1969	Wimbledon	(Australia) Rod Laver	(Australia) John Newcombe	6–4	5–7	6–4	6–4	
1969	US Open	(Australia) Rod Laver	(Australia) Tony Roche	7–9	6–1	6–2	6–2	
1970	Australian Open	(United States) Arthur Ashe	(Australia) Dick Crealy^{†}	6–4	9–7	6–2		
1970	French Open	(Czechoslovakia) Jan Kodeš^{☆}	(Socialist Federal Republic of Yugoslavia) Željko Franulović^{†}	6–2	6–4	6–0		
1970	Wimbledon	(Australia) John Newcombe	(Australia) Ken Rosewall	5–7	6–3	6–2	3–6	6–1
1970	US Open	(Australia) Ken Rosewall	(Australia) Tony Roche	2–6	6–4	7–6^{(5–2)}	6–3	
1971	Australian Open	(Australia) Ken Rosewall	(United States) Arthur Ashe	6–1	7–5	6–3		
1971	French Open	(Czechoslovakia) Jan Kodeš	(Romania) Ilie Năstase	8–6	6–2	2–6	7–5	
1971	Wimbledon	(Australia) John Newcombe	(United States) Stan Smith	6–3	5–7	2–6	6–4	6–4
1971	US Open	(United States) Stan Smith^{☆}	(Czechoslovakia) Jan Kodeš	3–6	6–3	6–2	7–6^{(5–3)}	
1972	Australian Open	(Australia) Ken Rosewall	(Australia) Mal Anderson	7–6^{(7–2)}	6–3	7–5		
1972	French Open	(Spain) Andrés Gimeno^{☆‡}	(France) Patrick Proisy^{†}	4–6	6–3	6–1	6–1	
1972	Wimbledon	(United States) Stan Smith	(Romania) Ilie Năstase	4–6	6–3	6–3	4–6	7–5
1972	US Open	(Romania) Ilie Năstase^{☆}	(United States) Arthur Ashe	3–6	6–3	6–7^{(1–5)}	6–4	6–3
1973	Australian Open	(Australia) John Newcombe	(New Zealand) Onny Parun^{†}	6–3	6–7	7–5	6–1	
1973	French Open	(Romania) Ilie Năstase	(Socialist Federal Republic of Yugoslavia) Nikola Pilić^{†}	6–3	6–3	6–0		
1973	Wimbledon	(Czechoslovakia) Jan Kodeš	(Soviet Union) Alex Metreveli^{†}	6–1	9–8^{(7–5)}	6–3		
1973	US Open	(Australia) John Newcombe	(Czechoslovakia) Jan Kodeš	6–4	1–6	4–6	6–2	6–3
1974	Australian Open	(United States) Jimmy Connors^{☆}	(Australia) Phil Dent^{†}	7–6^{(9–7)}	6–4	4–6	6–3	
1974	French Open	(Sweden) Björn Borg^{☆}	(Spain) Manuel Orantes	2–6	6–7^{(4–7)}	6–0	6–1	6–1
1974	Wimbledon	(United States) Jimmy Connors	(Australia) Ken Rosewall	6–1	6–1	6–4		
1974	US Open	(United States) Jimmy Connors	(Australia) Ken Rosewall	6–1	6–0	6–1		
1975	Australian Open	(Australia) John Newcombe	(United States) Jimmy Connors	7–5	3–6	6–4	7–6^{(9–7)}	
1975	French Open	(Sweden) Björn Borg	(Argentina) Guillermo Vilas	6–2	6–3	6–4		
1975	Wimbledon	(United States) Arthur Ashe	(United States) Jimmy Connors	6–1	6–1	5–7	6–4	
1975	US Open	(Spain) Manuel Orantes^{☆‡}	(United States) Jimmy Connors	6–4	6–3	6–3		
1976	Australian Open	(Australia) Mark Edmondson^{☆†‡}	(Australia) John Newcombe	6–7^{(5–7)}	6–3	7–6^{(8–6)}	6–1	
1976	French Open	(Italy) Adriano Panatta^{☆†‡}	(United States) Harold Solomon^{†}	6–1	6–4	4–6	7–6^{(7–3)}	
1976	Wimbledon	(Sweden) Björn Borg	(Romania) Ilie Năstase	6–4	6–2	9–7		
1976	US Open	(United States) Jimmy Connors	(Sweden) Björn Borg	6–4	3–6	7–6^{(11–9)}	6–4	
1977	Australian Open ^{(Jan)}	(United States) Roscoe Tanner^{☆‡}	(Argentina) Guillermo Vilas	6–3	6–3	6–3		
1977	French Open	(Argentina) Guillermo Vilas^{☆}	(United States) Brian Gottfried^{†}	6–0	6–3	6–0		
1977	Wimbledon	(Sweden) Björn Borg	(United States) Jimmy Connors	3–6	6–2	6–1	5–7	6–4
1977	US Open	(Argentina) Guillermo Vilas	(United States) Jimmy Connors	2–6	6–3	7–6^{(7–4)}	6–0	
1977	Australian Open ^{(Dec)}	(United States) Vitas Gerulaitis^{☆‡}	(United Kingdom) John Lloyd^{†}	6–3	7–6^{(7–4)}	5–7	3–6	6–2
1978	French Open	(Sweden) Björn Borg	(Argentina) Guillermo Vilas	6–1	6–1	6–3		
1978	Wimbledon	(Sweden) Björn Borg	(United States) Jimmy Connors	6–2	6–2	6–3		
1978	US Open	(United States) Jimmy Connors	(Sweden) Björn Borg	6–4	6–2	6–2		
1978	Australian Open	(Argentina) Guillermo Vilas	(Australia) John Marks^{†}	6–4	6–4	3–6	6–3	
1979	French Open	(Sweden) Björn Borg	(Paraguay) Víctor Pecci^{†}	6–3	6–1	6–7^{(6–8)}	6–4	
1979	Wimbledon	(Sweden) Björn Borg	(United States) Roscoe Tanner	6–7^{(4–7)}	6–1	3–6	6–3	6–4
1979	US Open	(United States) John McEnroe^{☆}	(United States) Vitas Gerulaitis	7–5	6–3	6–3		
1979	Australian Open	(Argentina) Guillermo Vilas	(United States) John Sadri^{†}	7–6^{(7–4)}	6–3	6–2		
1980	French Open	(Sweden) Björn Borg	(United States) Vitas Gerulaitis	6–4	6–1	6–2		
1980	Wimbledon	(Sweden) Björn Borg	(United States) John McEnroe	1–6	7–5	6–3	6–7^{(16–18)}	8–6
1980	US Open	(United States) John McEnroe	(Sweden) Björn Borg	7–6^{(7–4)}	6–1	6–7^{(5–7)}	5–7	6–4
1980	Australian Open	(United States) Brian Teacher^{☆†‡}	(Australia) Kim Warwick^{†}	7–5	7–6^{(7–4)}	6–2		
1981	French Open	(Sweden) Björn Borg	(Czechoslovakia) Ivan Lendl	6–1	4–6	6–2	3–6	6–1
1981	Wimbledon	(United States) John McEnroe	(Sweden) Björn Borg	4–6	7–6^{(7–1)}	7–6^{(7–4)}	6–4	
1981	US Open	(United States) John McEnroe	(Sweden) Björn Borg	4–6	6–2	6–4	6–3	
1981	Australian Open	(South Africa) Johan Kriek^{☆}	(United States) Steve Denton	6–2	7–6^{(7–1)}	6–7^{(1–7)}	6–4	
1982	French Open	(Sweden) Mats Wilander^{☆}	(Argentina) Guillermo Vilas	1–6	7–6^{(8–6)}	6–0	6–4	
1982	Wimbledon	(United States) Jimmy Connors	(United States) John McEnroe	3–6	6–3	6–7^{(2–7)}	7–6^{(7–5)}	6–4
1982	US Open	(United States) Jimmy Connors	(Czechoslovakia) Ivan Lendl	6–3	6–2	4–6	6–4	
1982	Australian Open	(United States) Johan Kriek	(United States) Steve Denton	6–3	6–3	6–2		
1983	French Open	(France) Yannick Noah^{☆†‡}	(Sweden) Mats Wilander	6–2	7–5	7–6^{(7–3)}		
1983	Wimbledon	(United States) John McEnroe	(New Zealand) Chris Lewis^{†}	6–2	6–2	6–2		
1983	US Open	(United States) Jimmy Connors	(Czechoslovakia) Ivan Lendl	6–3	6–7^{(2–7)}	7–5	6–0	
1983	Australian Open	(Sweden) Mats Wilander	(Czechoslovakia) Ivan Lendl	6–1	6–4	6–4		
1984	French Open	(Czechoslovakia) Ivan Lendl^{☆}	(United States) John McEnroe	3–6	2–6	6–4	7–5	7–5
1984	Wimbledon	(United States) John McEnroe	(United States) Jimmy Connors	6–1	6–1	6–2		
1984	US Open	(United States) John McEnroe	(Czechoslovakia) Ivan Lendl	6–3	6–4	6–1		
1984	Australian Open	(Sweden) Mats Wilander	(South Africa) Kevin Curren	6–7^{(5–7)}	6–4	7–6^{(7–3)}	6–2	
1985	French Open	(Sweden) Mats Wilander	(Czechoslovakia) Ivan Lendl	3–6	6–4	6–2	6–2	
1985	Wimbledon	(West Germany) Boris Becker^{☆}	(United States) Kevin Curren	6–3	6–7^{(4–7)}	7–6^{(7–3)}	6–4	
1985	US Open	(Czechoslovakia) Ivan Lendl	(United States) John McEnroe	7–6^{(7–1)}	6–3	6–4		
1985	Australian Open	(Sweden) Stefan Edberg^{☆}	(Sweden) Mats Wilander	6–4	6–3	6–3		
1986	French Open	(Czechoslovakia) Ivan Lendl	(Sweden) Mikael Pernfors^{†}	6–3	6–2	6–4		
1986	Wimbledon	(West Germany) Boris Becker	(Czechoslovakia) Ivan Lendl	6–4	6–3	7–5		
1986	US Open	(Czechoslovakia) Ivan Lendl	(Czechoslovakia) Miloslav Mečíř	6–4	6–2	6–0		
1987	Australian Open	(Sweden) Stefan Edberg	(Australia) Pat Cash	6–3	6–4	3–6	5–7	6–3
1987	French Open	(Czechoslovakia) Ivan Lendl	(Sweden) Mats Wilander	7–5	6–2	3–6	7–6^{(7–3)}	
1987	Wimbledon	(Australia) Pat Cash^{☆‡}	(Czechoslovakia) Ivan Lendl	7–6^{(7–5)}	6–2	7–5		
1987	US Open	(Czechoslovakia) Ivan Lendl	(Sweden) Mats Wilander	6–7^{(7–9)}	6–0	7–6^{(7–4)}	6–4	
1988	Australian Open	(Sweden) Mats Wilander	(Australia) Pat Cash	6–3	6–7^{(3–7)}	3–6	6–1	8–6
1988	French Open	(Sweden) Mats Wilander	(France) Henri Leconte^{†}	7–5	6–2	6–1		
1988	Wimbledon	(Sweden) Stefan Edberg	(West Germany) Boris Becker	4–6	7–6^{(7–2)}	6–4	6–2	
1988	US Open	(Sweden) Mats Wilander	(Czechoslovakia) Ivan Lendl	6–4	4–6	6–3	5–7	6–4
1989	Australian Open	(Czechoslovakia) Ivan Lendl	(Czechoslovakia) Miloslav Mečíř	6–2	6–2	6–2		
1989	French Open	(United States) Michael Chang^{☆‡}	(Sweden) Stefan Edberg	6–1	3–6	4–6	6–4	6–2
1989	Wimbledon	(West Germany) Boris Becker	(Sweden) Stefan Edberg	6–0	7–6^{(7–1)}	6–4		
1989	US Open	(West Germany) Boris Becker	(Czechoslovakia) Ivan Lendl	7–6^{(7–2)}	1–6	6–3	7–6^{(7–4)}	
1990	Australian Open	(Czechoslovakia) Ivan Lendl	(Sweden) Stefan Edberg	4–6	7–6^{(7–3)}	5–2 ret.		
1990	French Open	(Ecuador) Andrés Gómez^{☆†‡}	(United States) Andre Agassi	6–3	2–6	6–4	6–4	
1990	Wimbledon	(Sweden) Stefan Edberg	(West Germany) Boris Becker	6–2	6–2	3–6	3–6	6–4
1990	US Open	(United States) Pete Sampras^{☆}	(United States) Andre Agassi	6–4	6–3	6–2		
1991	Australian Open	(Germany) Boris Becker	(Czechoslovakia) Ivan Lendl	1–6	6–4	6–4	6–4	
1991	French Open	(United States) Jim Courier^{☆}	(United States) Andre Agassi	3–6	6–4	2–6	6–1	6–4
1991	Wimbledon	(Germany) Michael Stich^{☆‡}	(Germany) Boris Becker	6–4	7–6^{(7–4)}	6–4		
1991	US Open	(Sweden) Stefan Edberg	(United States) Jim Courier	6–2	6–4	6–0		
1992	Australian Open	(United States) Jim Courier	(Sweden) Stefan Edberg	6–3	3–6	6–4	6–2	
1992	French Open	(United States) Jim Courier	(Czechoslovakia) Petr Korda	7–5	6–2	6–1		
1992	Wimbledon	(United States) Andre Agassi^{☆}	(Croatia) Goran Ivanišević	6–7^{(8–10)}	6–4	6–4	1–6	6–4
1992	US Open	(Sweden) Stefan Edberg	(United States) Pete Sampras	3–6	6–4	7–6^{(7–5)}	6–2	
1993	Australian Open	(United States) Jim Courier	(Sweden) Stefan Edberg	6–2	6–1	2–6	7–5	
1993	French Open	(Spain) Sergi Bruguera^{☆}	(United States) Jim Courier	6–4	2–6	6–2	3–6	6–3
1993	Wimbledon	(United States) Pete Sampras	(United States) Jim Courier	7–6^{(7–3)}	7–6^{(8–6)}	3–6	6–3	
1993	US Open	(United States) Pete Sampras	(France) Cédric Pioline	6–4	6–4	6–3		
1994	Australian Open	(United States) Pete Sampras	(United States) Todd Martin	7–6^{(7–4)}	6–4	6–4		
1994	French Open	(Spain) Sergi Bruguera	(Spain) Alberto Berasategui^{†}	6–3	7–5	2–6	6–1	
1994	Wimbledon	(United States) Pete Sampras	(Croatia) Goran Ivanišević	7–6^{(7–2)}	7–6^{(7–5)}	6–0		
1994	US Open	(United States) Andre Agassi	(Germany) Michael Stich	6–1	7–6^{(7–5)}	7–5		
1995	Australian Open	(United States) Andre Agassi	(United States) Pete Sampras	4–6	6–1	7–6^{(8–6)}	6–4	
1995	French Open	(Austria) Thomas Muster^{☆†‡}	(United States) Michael Chang	7–5	6–2	6–4		
1995	Wimbledon	(United States) Pete Sampras	(Germany) Boris Becker	6–7^{(5–7)}	6–2	6–4	6–2	
1995	US Open	(United States) Pete Sampras	(United States) Andre Agassi	6–4	6–3	4–6	7–5	
1996	Australian Open	(Germany) Boris Becker	(United States) Michael Chang	6–2	6–4	2–6	6–2	
1996	French Open	(Russia) Yevgeny Kafelnikov^{☆}	(Germany) Michael Stich	7–6^{(7–4)}	7–5	7–6^{(7–4)}		
1996	Wimbledon	(Netherlands) Richard Krajicek^{☆†‡}	(United States) MaliVai Washington^{†}	6–3	6–4	6–3		
1996	US Open	(United States) Pete Sampras	(United States) Michael Chang	6–1	6–4	7–6^{(7–3)}		
1997	Australian Open	(United States) Pete Sampras	(Spain) Carlos Moyá	6–2	6–3	6–3		
1997	French Open	(Brazil) Gustavo Kuerten^{☆}	(Spain) Sergi Bruguera	6–3	6–4	6–2		
1997	Wimbledon	(United States) Pete Sampras	(France) Cédric Pioline	6–4	6–2	6–4		
1997	US Open	(Australia) Patrick Rafter^{☆}	(United Kingdom) Greg Rusedski^{†}	6–3	6–2	4–6	7–5	
1998	Australian Open	(Czech Republic) Petr Korda^{☆‡}	(Chile) Marcelo Ríos^{†}	6–2	6–2	6–2		
1998	French Open	(Spain) Carlos Moyá^{☆‡}	(Spain) Àlex Corretja	6–3	7–5	6–3		
1998	Wimbledon	(United States) Pete Sampras	(Croatia) Goran Ivanišević	6–7^{(2–7)}	7–6^{(11–9)}	6–4	3–6	6–2
1998	US Open	(Australia) Patrick Rafter	(Australia) Mark Philippoussis	6–3	3–6	6–2	6–0	
1999	Australian Open	(Russia) Yevgeny Kafelnikov	(Sweden) Thomas Enqvist^{†}	4–6	6–0	6–3	7–6^{(7–1)}	
1999	French Open	(United States) Andre Agassi	(Ukraine) Andrei Medvedev^{†}	1–6	2–6	6–4	6–3	6–4
1999	Wimbledon	(United States) Pete Sampras	(United States) Andre Agassi	6–3	6–4	7–5		
1999	US Open	(United States) Andre Agassi	(United States) Todd Martin	6–4	6–7^{(5–7)}	6–7^{(2–7)}	6–3	6–2
2000	Australian Open	(United States) Andre Agassi	(Russia) Yevgeny Kafelnikov	3–6	6–3	6–2	6–4	
2000	French Open	(Brazil) Gustavo Kuerten	(Sweden) Magnus Norman^{†}	6–2	6–3	2–6	7–6^{(8–6)}	
2000	Wimbledon	(United States) Pete Sampras	(Australia) Patrick Rafter	6–7^{(10–12)}	7–6^{(7–5)}	6–4	6–2	
2000	US Open	(Russia) Marat Safin^{☆}	(United States) Pete Sampras	6–4	6–3	6–3		
2001	Australian Open	(United States) Andre Agassi	(France) Arnaud Clément^{†}	6–4	6–2	6–2		
2001	French Open	(Brazil) Gustavo Kuerten	(Spain) Àlex Corretja	6–7^{(3–7)}	7–5	6–2	6–0	
2001	Wimbledon	(Croatia) Goran Ivanišević^{☆‡}	(Australia) Patrick Rafter	6–3	3–6	6–3	2–6	9–7
2001	US Open	(Australia) Lleyton Hewitt^{☆}	(United States) Pete Sampras	7–6^{(7–4)}	6–1	6–1		
2002	Australian Open	(Sweden) Thomas Johansson^{☆†‡}	(Russia) Marat Safin	3–6	6–4	6–4	7–6^{(7–4)}	
2002	French Open	(Spain) Albert Costa^{☆†‡}	(Spain) Juan Carlos Ferrero	6–1	6–0	4–6	6–3	
2002	Wimbledon	(Australia) Lleyton Hewitt	(Argentina) David Nalbandian^{†}	6–1	6–3	6–2		
2002	US Open	(United States) Pete Sampras	(United States) Andre Agassi	6–3	6–4	5–7	6–4	
2003	Australian Open	(United States) Andre Agassi	(Germany) Rainer Schüttler^{†}	6–2	6–2	6–1		
2003	French Open	(Spain) Juan Carlos Ferrero^{☆‡}	(Netherlands) Martin Verkerk^{†}	6–1	6–3	6–2		
2003	Wimbledon	(Switzerland) Roger Federer^{☆}	(Australia) Mark Philippoussis	7–6^{(7–5)}	6–2	7–6^{(7–3)}		
2003	US Open	(United States) Andy Roddick^{☆‡}	(Spain) Juan Carlos Ferrero	6–3	7–6^{(7–2)}	6–3		
2004	Australian Open	(Switzerland) Roger Federer	(Russia) Marat Safin	7–6^{(7–3)}	6–4	6–2		
2004	French Open	(Argentina) Gastón Gaudio^{☆†‡}	(Argentina) Guillermo Coria^{†}	0–6	3–6	6–4	6–1	8–6
2004	Wimbledon	(Switzerland) Roger Federer	(United States) Andy Roddick	4–6	7–5	7–6^{(7–3)}	6–3	
2004	US Open	(Switzerland) Roger Federer	(Australia) Lleyton Hewitt	6–0	7–6^{(7–3)}	6–0		
2005	Australian Open	(Russia) Marat Safin	(Australia) Lleyton Hewitt	1–6	6–3	6–4	6–4	
2005	French Open	(Spain) Rafael Nadal^{☆}	(Argentina) Mariano Puerta^{†}	6–7^{(6–8)}	6–3	6–1	7–5	
2005	Wimbledon	(Switzerland) Roger Federer	(United States) Andy Roddick	6–2	7–6^{(7–2)}	6–4		
2005	US Open	(Switzerland) Roger Federer	(United States) Andre Agassi	6–3	2–6	7–6^{(7–1)}	6–1	
2006	Australian Open	(Switzerland) Roger Federer	(Cyprus) Marcos Baghdatis^{†}	5–7	7–5	6–0	6–2	
2006	French Open	(Spain) Rafael Nadal	(Switzerland) Roger Federer	1–6	6–1	6–4	7–6^{(7–4)}	
2006	Wimbledon	(Switzerland) Roger Federer	(Spain) Rafael Nadal	6–0	7–6^{(7–5)}	6–7^{(7–9)}	6–3	
2006	US Open	(Switzerland) Roger Federer	(United States) Andy Roddick	6–2	4–6	7–5	6–1	
2007	Australian Open	(Switzerland) Roger Federer	(Chile) Fernando González^{†}	7–6^{(7–2)}	6–4	6–4		
2007	French Open	(Spain) Rafael Nadal	(Switzerland) Roger Federer	6–3	4–6	6–3	6–4	
2007	Wimbledon	(Switzerland) Roger Federer	(Spain) Rafael Nadal	7–6^{(9–7)}	4–6	7–6^{(7–3)}	2–6	6–2
2007	US Open	(Switzerland) Roger Federer	(Serbia) Novak Djokovic	7–6^{(7–4)}	7–6^{(7–2)}	6–4		
2008	Australian Open	(Serbia) Novak Djokovic^{☆}	(France) Jo-Wilfried Tsonga^{†}	4–6	6–4	6–3	7–6^{(7–2)}	
2008	French Open	(Spain) Rafael Nadal	(Switzerland) Roger Federer	6–1	6–3	6–0		
2008	Wimbledon	(Spain) Rafael Nadal	(Switzerland) Roger Federer	6–4	6–4	6–7^{(5–7)}	6–7^{(8–10)}	9–7
2008	US Open	(Switzerland) Roger Federer	(United Kingdom) Andy Murray	6–2	7–5	6–2		
2009	Australian Open	(Spain) Rafael Nadal	(Switzerland) Roger Federer	7–5	3–6	7–6^{(7–3)}	3–6	6–2
2009	French Open	(Switzerland) Roger Federer	(Sweden) Robin Söderling	6–1	7–6^{(7–1)}	6–4		
2009	Wimbledon	(Switzerland) Roger Federer	(United States) Andy Roddick	5–7	7–6^{(8–6)}	7–6^{(7–5)}	3–6	16–14
2009	US Open	(Argentina) Juan Martín del Potro^{☆‡}	(Switzerland) Roger Federer	3–6	7–6^{(7–5)}	4–6	7–6^{(7–4)}	6–2
2010	Australian Open	(Switzerland) Roger Federer	(United Kingdom) Andy Murray	6–3	6–4	7–6^{(13–11)}		
2010	French Open	(Spain) Rafael Nadal	(Sweden) Robin Söderling	6–4	6–2	6–4		
2010	Wimbledon	(Spain) Rafael Nadal	(Czech Republic) Tomáš Berdych^{†}	6–3	7–5	6–4		
2010	US Open	(Spain) Rafael Nadal	(Serbia) Novak Djokovic	6–4	5–7	6–4	6–2	
2011	Australian Open	(Serbia) Novak Djokovic	(United Kingdom) Andy Murray	6–4	6–2	6–3		
2011	French Open	(Spain) Rafael Nadal	(Switzerland) Roger Federer	7–5	7–6^{(7–3)}	5–7	6–1	
2011	Wimbledon	(Serbia) Novak Djokovic	(Spain) Rafael Nadal	6–4	6–1	1–6	6–3	
2011	US Open	(Serbia) Novak Djokovic	(Spain) Rafael Nadal	6–2	6–4	6–7^{(3–7)}	6–1	
2012	Australian Open	(Serbia) Novak Djokovic	(Spain) Rafael Nadal	5–7	6–4	6–2	6–7^{(5–7)}	7–5
2012	French Open	(Spain) Rafael Nadal	(Serbia) Novak Djokovic	6–4	6–3	2–6	7–5	
2012	Wimbledon	(Switzerland) Roger Federer	(United Kingdom) Andy Murray	4–6	7–5	6–3	6–4	
2012	US Open	(United Kingdom) Andy Murray^{☆}	(Serbia) Novak Djokovic	7–6^{(12–10)}	7–5	2–6	3–6	6–2
2013	Australian Open	(Serbia) Novak Djokovic	(United Kingdom) Andy Murray	6–7^{(2–7)}	7–6^{(7–3)}	6–3	6–2	
2013	French Open	(Spain) Rafael Nadal	(Spain) David Ferrer^{†}	6–3	6–2	6–3		
2013	Wimbledon	(United Kingdom) Andy Murray	(Serbia) Novak Djokovic	6–4	7–5	6–4		
2013	US Open	(Spain) Rafael Nadal	(Serbia) Novak Djokovic	6–2	3–6	6–4	6–1	
2014	Australian Open	(Switzerland) Stan Wawrinka^{☆}	(Spain) Rafael Nadal	6–3	6–2	3–6	6–3	
2014	French Open	(Spain) Rafael Nadal	(Serbia) Novak Djokovic	3–6	7–5	6–2	6–4	
2014	Wimbledon	(Serbia) Novak Djokovic	(Switzerland) Roger Federer	6–7^{(7–9)}	6–4	7–6^{(7–4)}	5–7	6–4
2014	US Open	(Croatia) Marin Čilić^{☆‡}	(Japan) Kei Nishikori^{†}	6–3	6–3	6–3		
2015	Australian Open	(Serbia) Novak Djokovic	(United Kingdom) Andy Murray	7–6^{(7–5)}	6–7^{(4–7)}	6–3	6–0	
2015	French Open	(Switzerland) Stan Wawrinka	(Serbia) Novak Djokovic	4–6	6–4	6–3	6–4	
2015	Wimbledon	(Serbia) Novak Djokovic	(Switzerland) Roger Federer	7–6^{(7–1)}	6–7^{(10–12)}	6–4	6–3	
2015	US Open	(Serbia) Novak Djokovic	(Switzerland) Roger Federer	6–4	5–7	6–4	6–4	
2016	Australian Open	(Serbia) Novak Djokovic	(United Kingdom) Andy Murray	6–1	7–5	7–6^{(7–3)}		
2016	French Open	(Serbia) Novak Djokovic	(United Kingdom) Andy Murray	3–6	6–1	6–2	6–4	
2016	Wimbledon	(United Kingdom) Andy Murray	(Canada) Milos Raonic^{†}	6–4	7–6^{(7–3)}	7–6^{(7–2)}		
2016	US Open	(Switzerland) Stan Wawrinka	(Serbia) Novak Djokovic	6–7^{(1–7)}	6–4	7–5	6–3	
2017	Australian Open	(Switzerland) Roger Federer	(Spain) Rafael Nadal	6–4	3–6	6–1	3–6	6–3
2017	French Open	(Spain) Rafael Nadal	(Switzerland) Stan Wawrinka	6–2	6–3	6–1		
2017	Wimbledon	(Switzerland) Roger Federer	(Croatia) Marin Čilić	6–3	6–1	6–4		
2017	US Open	(Spain) Rafael Nadal	(South Africa) Kevin Anderson	6–3	6–3	6–4		
2018	Australian Open	(Switzerland) Roger Federer	(Croatia) Marin Čilić	6–2	6–7^{(5–7)}	6–3	3–6	6–1
2018	French Open	(Spain) Rafael Nadal	(Austria) Dominic Thiem	6–4	6–3	6–2		
2018	Wimbledon	(Serbia) Novak Djokovic	(South Africa) Kevin Anderson	6–2	6–2	7–6^{(7–3)}		
2018	US Open	(Serbia) Novak Djokovic	(Argentina) Juan Martín del Potro	6–3	7–6^{(7–4)}	6–3		
2019	Australian Open	(Serbia) Novak Djokovic	(Spain) Rafael Nadal	6–3	6–2	6–3		
2019	French Open	(Spain) Rafael Nadal	(Austria) Dominic Thiem	6–3	5–7	6–1	6–1	
2019	Wimbledon	(Serbia) Novak Djokovic	(Switzerland) Roger Federer	7–6^{(7–5)}	1–6	7–6^{(7–4)}	4–6	13–12^{(7–3)}
2019	US Open	(Spain) Rafael Nadal	(Russia) Daniil Medvedev	7–5	6–3	5–7	4–6	6–4
2020	Australian Open	(Serbia) Novak Djokovic	(Austria) Dominic Thiem	6–4	4–6	2–6	6–3	6–4
2020	US Open	(Austria) Dominic Thiem^{☆‡}	(Germany) Alexander Zverev	2–6	4–6	6–4	6–3	7–6^{(8–6)}
2020	French Open	(Spain) Rafael Nadal	(Serbia) Novak Djokovic	6–0	6–2	7–5		
2021	Australian Open	(Serbia) Novak Djokovic	(Russia) Daniil Medvedev	7–5	6–2	6–2		
2021	French Open	(Serbia) Novak Djokovic	(Greece) Stefanos Tsitsipas	6–7^{(6–8)}	2–6	6–3	6–2	6–4
2021	Wimbledon	(Serbia) Novak Djokovic	(Italy) Matteo Berrettini^{†}	6–7^{(4–7)}	6–4	6–4	6–3	
2021	US Open	(Russia) Daniil Medvedev^{☆‡}	(Serbia) Novak Djokovic	6–4	6–4	6–4		
2022	Australian Open	(Spain) Rafael Nadal	(Russia) Daniil Medvedev	2–6	6–7^{(5–7)}	6–4	6–4	7–5
2022	French Open	(Spain) Rafael Nadal	(Norway) Casper Ruud	6–3	6–3	6–0		
2022	Wimbledon	(Serbia) Novak Djokovic	(Australia) Nick Kyrgios^{†}	4–6	6–3	6–4	7–6^{(7–3)}	
2022	US Open	(Spain) Carlos Alcaraz^{☆}	(Norway) Casper Ruud	6–4	2–6	7–6^{(7–1)}	6–3	
2023	Australian Open	(Serbia) Novak Djokovic	(Greece) Stefanos Tsitsipas	6–3	7–6^{(7–4)}	7–6^{(7–5)}		
2023	French Open	(Serbia) Novak Djokovic	(Norway) Casper Ruud	7–6^{(7–1)}	6–3	7–5		
2023	Wimbledon	(Spain) Carlos Alcaraz	(Serbia) Novak Djokovic	1–6	7–6^{(8–6)}	6–1	3–6	6–4
2023	US Open	(Serbia) Novak Djokovic	Daniil Medvedev	6–3	7–6^{(7–5)}	6–3		
2024	Australian Open	(Italy) Jannik Sinner^{☆}	Daniil Medvedev	3–6	3–6	6–4	6–4	6–3
2024	French Open	(Spain) Carlos Alcaraz	(Germany) Alexander Zverev	6–3	2–6	5–7	6–1	6–2
2024	Wimbledon	(Spain) Carlos Alcaraz	(Serbia) Novak Djokovic	6–2	6–2	7–6^{(7–4)}		
2024	US Open	(Italy) Jannik Sinner	(United States) Taylor Fritz^{†}	6–3	6–4	7–5		
2025	Australian Open	(Italy) Jannik Sinner	(Germany) Alexander Zverev	6–3	7–6^{(7–4)}	6–3		
2025	French Open	(Spain) Carlos Alcaraz	(Italy) Jannik Sinner	4–6	6–7^{(4–7)}	6–4	7–6^{(7–3)}	7–6^{(10–2)}
2025	Wimbledon	(Italy) Jannik Sinner	(Spain) Carlos Alcaraz	4–6	6–4	6–4	6–4	
2025	US Open	(Spain) Carlos Alcaraz	(Italy) Jannik Sinner	6–2	3–6	6–1	6–4	
2026	Australian Open	(Spain) Carlos Alcaraz	(Serbia) Novak Djokovic	2–6	6–2	6–3	7–5	
2026	French Open	(Germany) Alexander Zverev^{☆}	(Italy) Flavio Cobolli^{†}	6–1	4–6	6–4	6–7^{(5–7)}	6–1
2026	Wimbledon	(Italy) Jannik Sinner	(Germany) Alexander Zverev	6–7^{(7–9)}	7–6^{(7–2)}	6–3	6–4	
2026	US Open	(Germany) Alexander Zverev	(United States) Ben Shelton^{†}	6–3	7–6^{(7–2)}	5–7	6–2	
	Finals	Winners	Name	Australian Open	French Open	Wimbledon	US Open	Grand Slam total
	495	154	Total editions	114	96	139	146	495

== Longest finals ==
=== Overall ===
By duration
2012 Australian Open
5 hours and 53 minutes
(Serbia) Novak Djokovic	5	6	6	6^{5}	7
(Spain) Rafael Nadal	7	4	2	7^{7}	5

Note: Fourth longest major singles match in history.

By number of games
2009 Wimbledon Championships
77 games
(Switzerland) Roger Federer	5	7^{8}	7^{7}	3	16
(United States) Andy Roddick	7	6^{6}	6^{5}	6	14

Note: Also the longest final set in a major final by games.

=== Per tournament ===
- 2012 Australian Open final between Djokovic and Nadal. (5H:53M)
- 2025 French Open final between Alcaraz and Sinner. (5H:29M)
- 2019 Wimbledon final between Djokovic and Federer. (4H:57M)
- 1988 US Open final between Wilander and Lendl, and 2012 between Murray and Djokovic. (4H:54M)

== First-timer finals ==
There have been 47 Grand Slam finals contested between first-time finalists (14 in the Open Era):

Tournament	Winner	Opponent
1877 Wimbledon	(United Kingdom) Spencer Gore	(United Kingdom) William Marshall
1879 Wimbledon	(United Kingdom) John Hartley	(United Kingdom) Vere St. Leger Goold
1881 U.S. National	(United States) Richard Sears	(United Kingdom) William Glyn
1891 Wimbledon	(United Kingdom) Wilfred Baddeley	(United Kingdom) Joshua Pim
1898 U.S. National	(United States) Malcolm Whitman	(United States) Dwight F. Davis
1904 U.S. National	(United States) Holcombe Ward	(United States) William Clothier
1905 Australasian	(Australia) Rodney Heath	(Australia) Albert Curtis
1906 Australasian	(New Zealand) Anthony Wilding	(New Zealand) Harry Parker
1908 Australasian	(United States) Fred Alexander	(Australia) Alfred Dunlop
1912 Australasian	(United Kingdom) James Cecil Parke	(United Kingdom) Alfred Beamish
1914 Australasian	(Australia) Arthur O'Hara Wood	(Australia) Gerald Patterson
1917 U.S. National	(United States) Robert Lindley Murray	(United States) Nathaniel Niles
1919 Australasian	(United Kingdom) Algernon Kingscote	(Australia) Eric Pockley
1920 Australasian	(Australia) Pat O'Hara Wood	(Australia) Ronald Thomas
1921 Australasian	(Australia) Rice Gemmell	(Australia) Alf Hedeman
1924 Wimbledon	(France) Jean Borotra	(France) René Lacoste
1926 Australasian	(Australia) John Hawkes	(Australia) James Willard
1930 Australian	(Australia) Edgar Moon	(Australia) Harry Hopman
1930 U.S. National	(United States) John Doeg	(United States) Frank Shields
1931 U.S. National	(United States) Ellsworth Vines	(United States) George Lott
1937 Australian	(Australia) Vivian McGrath	(Australia) John Bromwich
1939 French	(United States) Don McNeill	(United States) Bobby Riggs
1942 U.S. National	(United States) Ted Schroeder	(United States) Frank Parker
1943 U.S. National	(United States) Joseph Hunt	(United States) Jack Kramer
1946 French	(France) Marcel Bernard	(Czechoslovakia) Jaroslav Drobný
1946 Wimbledon	(France) Yvon Petra	(Australia) Geoff Brown
1947 French	(Hungary) József Asbóth	(South Africa) Eric Sturgess
1950 U.S. National	(United States) Arthur Larsen	(United States) Herbert Flam
1953 Australian	(Australia) Ken Rosewall	(Australia) Mervyn Rose
1957 Australian	(Australia) Ashley Cooper	(Australia) Neale Fraser
1959 French	(Italy) Nicola Pietrangeli	(South Africa) Ian Vermaak
1963 U.S. National	(Mexico) Rafael Osuna	(United States) Frank Froehling
1968 Australian	(Australia) Bill Bowrey	(Spain) Juan Gisbert
1970 French Open	(Czechoslovakia) Jan Kodeš	(Socialist Federal Republic of Yugoslavia) Željko Franulović
1974 Australian Open	(United States) Jimmy Connors	(Australia) Phil Dent
1974 French Open	(Sweden) Björn Borg	(Spain) Manuel Orantes
1976 French Open	(Italy) Adriano Panatta	(United States) Harold Solomon
1977 Australian Open	(United States) Vitas Gerulaitis	(United Kingdom) John Lloyd
1980 Australian Open	(United States) Brian Teacher	(Australia) Kim Warwick
1981 Australian Open	(South Africa) Johan Kriek	(United States) Steve Denton
1990 French Open	(Ecuador) Andrés Gómez	(United States) Andre Agassi
1996 Wimbledon	(Netherlands) Richard Krajicek	(United States) MaliVai Washington
1997 US Open	(Australia) Patrick Rafter	(United Kingdom) Greg Rusedski
2002 French Open	(Spain) Albert Costa	(Spain) Juan Carlos Ferrero
2004 French Open	(Argentina) Gastón Gaudio	(Argentina) Guillermo Coria
2005 French Open	(Spain) Rafael Nadal	(Argentina) Mariano Puerta
2014 US Open	(Croatia) Marin Čilić	(Japan) Kei Nishikori

== All-countrymen finals (Open Era) ==
Seven countries (Australia, United States, Sweden, Czechoslovakia, Germany, Spain, Argentina) have had two countrymen play in a final in the Open Era.

Tournament	Winner	Opponent
1968 French Open	(Australia) Ken Rosewall	(Australia) Rod Laver
1968 Wimbledon	(Australia) Rod Laver	(Australia) Tony Roche
1969 French Open	(Australia) Rod Laver	(Australia) Ken Rosewall
1969 Wimbledon	(Australia) Rod Laver	(Australia) John Newcombe
1969 US Open	(Australia) Rod Laver	(Australia) Tony Roche
1970 Wimbledon	(Australia) John Newcombe	(Australia) Ken Rosewall
1970 US Open	(Australia) Ken Rosewall	(Australia) Tony Roche
1972 Australian Open	(Australia) Ken Rosewall	(Australia) Mal Anderson
1975 Wimbledon	(United States) Arthur Ashe	(United States) Jimmy Connors
1976 Australian Open	(Australia) Mark Edmondson	(Australia) John Newcombe
1979 US Open	(United States) John McEnroe	(United States) Vitas Gerulaitis
1982 Wimbledon	(United States) Jimmy Connors	(United States) John McEnroe
1982 Australian Open	(United States) Johan Kriek	(United States) Steve Denton
1984 Wimbledon	(United States) John McEnroe	(United States) Jimmy Connors
1985 Australian Open	(Sweden) Stefan Edberg	(Sweden) Mats Wilander
1986 US Open	(Czechoslovakia) Ivan Lendl	(Czechoslovakia) Miloslav Mečíř
1989 Australian Open	(Czechoslovakia) Ivan Lendl	(Czechoslovakia) Miloslav Mečíř
1990 US Open	(United States) Pete Sampras	(United States) Andre Agassi
1991 French Open	(United States) Jim Courier	(United States) Andre Agassi
1991 Wimbledon	(Germany) Michael Stich	(Germany) Boris Becker
1993 Wimbledon	(United States) Pete Sampras	(United States) Jim Courier
1994 Australian Open	(United States) Pete Sampras	(United States) Todd Martin
1994 French Open	(Spain) Sergi Bruguera	(Spain) Alberto Berasategui
1995 Australian Open	(United States) Andre Agassi	(United States) Pete Sampras
1995 US Open	(United States) Pete Sampras	(United States) Andre Agassi
1996 US Open	(United States) Pete Sampras	(United States) Michael Chang
1998 French Open	(Spain) Carlos Moyá	(Spain) Àlex Corretja
1998 US Open	(Australia) Patrick Rafter	(Australia) Mark Philippoussis
1999 Wimbledon	(United States) Pete Sampras	(United States) Andre Agassi
1999 US Open	(United States) Andre Agassi	(United States) Todd Martin
2002 French Open	(Spain) Albert Costa	(Spain) Juan Carlos Ferrero
2002 US Open	(United States) Pete Sampras	(United States) Andre Agassi
2004 French Open	(Argentina) Gastón Gaudio	(Argentina) Guillermo Coria
2013 French Open	(Spain) Rafael Nadal	(Spain) David Ferrer

== See also ==
- List of Grand Slam men's singles champions
- List of Australian Open singles finalists during the Open Era
- List of French Open singles finalists during the Open Era
- List of Wimbledon singles finalists during the Open Era
- List of US Open singles finalists during the Open Era
- List of Grand Slam women's singles finals
