= Western Australian Open (tennis) =

Defunct tennis tournament
- Event name: Western Australian Championships (1971–75)
- Tour: ILTF (1913–79) men WTA Tour (1971–75) women Grand Prix (1980) men
- Founded: 1895
- Abolished: 1984 (men's), 1994 (women's)
- Editions: 78 (men's), 88 (women's)
- Surface: Grass (1971–75)

The Western Australian Open, originally called the Western Australian Championships or Western Australia Championships, is a defunct Grand Prix tennis circuit men's and WTA Tour affiliated women's tennis tournament played from 1896 to 1975 at Royal King's Park Tennis Club in Perth, Australia and was played on grass courts.

== History ==
The event was established in 1895 and continued for 78 editions. The men's tournament was a ILTF sanctioned event from 1913 to 1967. In 1980 it became part of the Grand Prix circuit.

The women's event was part of WTA Tour affiliated women's tennis tournament played from 1971 to 1975. The women's event ended in 1994 and had run for 88 editions from 1895.

Margaret Court was the most successful player at the tournament, winning the singles competition three times and the doubles competition in 1971, partnering Australian Evonne Goolagong.

== Finals ==
=== Men's singles ===
Year	Champion	Runner-up	Score
1895	(Australia) Francis Marrie	(Australia) J. B. Spence	6–1, 6–4
1896	(Australia) Edward Boddington	(Australia) John Greayer	7–5, 3–6, 6–0, 6–0
1897	(United Kingdom) Herbert Orr	(Australia) Archer Hoskings	6–1, 6–0, 6–3
1898	(Australia) Arthur Greene	(Australia) Keith Bolton	3 sets to 2
1899	(Australia) James Cramond	(Australia) Keith Bolton	9–7, 6–4, 4–6, 3–6, 6–3
1900	(Australia) John Johnston	(Australia) J. Magee	3–6, 6–2, 6–3, 6–1
1901	(Australia) James Cramond	(Australia) John Greayer	8–6, 6–1, 6–1
1902	(Australia) Louis Humberstone Saxton	(Australia) James Cramond	3–6, 1–6, 6–3, 7–5, 6–1
1903	(Australia) Ernie Parker	(Australia) John Greayer	3–6, 6–1, 6–3, 6–2
1904	(Australia) Ernie Parker	(Australia) Keith Bolton	6–4, 7–5, 6–4
1905	(Australia) Stanley Doust	(Australia) Ernie Parker	6–4, 4–6, 6–8, 6–1, 7–5
1906	(New Zealand) Harry Parker	(Australia) Stanley Doust	6–2, 2–6, 6–2, 6–2
1907	(Australia) Ernie Parker	(Australia) John Griffiths	6–1, 3–6, 7–5, 4–6, 6–2
1908	(Australia) Ernie Parker	(Australia) Edgar Barnard	2–6, 6–3, 6–3, 6–2
1910	(Australia) Stanley Doust	(Australia) Ernie Parker	6–4, 6–4, 6–2
1911	(Australia) Ernie Parker	(Australia) Richard Parsons	6–4, 3–6, 6–0, 6–0
1912	(Australia) Ernie Parker	(Australia) John Addison	4–6, 10–8, 7–5, 6–4
1913	(Australia) Ernie Parker	(New Zealand) Harry Parker	2–6, 6–1, 6–3, 6–2
1914	(Australia) Arnold Leschen	(Australia) Edward Stokes	6–3, 5–7, 6–3, 7–9, 9–7
1915– 1918	Not held (due to World War I)		
1919	(Australia) Alf Hedemann	(Australia) Rice Gemmell	6–2, 5–7, 6–3, 6–2
1920	(Australia) Rice Gemmell	(Australia) Alf Hedemann	4–6, 6–4, 4–6, 6–3, 6–3
1922	(Australia) Robert Phillips	(Australia) Clarence Treloar	6–3, 6–0, 4–6, 9–7
1923	(Australia) Rice Gemmell	(Australia) Clarence Treloar	6–4, 6–3, 6–1
1924	(Australia) Rice Gemmell	(Australia) Robert Phillips	6–0, 6–0, 6–1
1925	(Australia) Rice Gemmell	(Australia) Robert Phillips	6–2, 8–6, 6–2
1926	(Australia) Rice Gemmell	(Australia) Clarence Treloar	6–1, 5–7, 3–6, 6–3, 6–2
1927	(Australia) Rice Gemmell	(Australia) Clarence Treloar	6–1, 5–7, 3–6, 6–3, 6–2
1928	(Australia) Ronald Ford	(Australia) Clarence Treloar	6–3, 4–6, 4–6, 7–5, 6–0
1929	(Australia) Richard Schlesinger	(Australia) Harry Jacoby	6–3, 6–2, 6–1
1930	(Australia) Ronald Ford	(Australia) Max Carpenter	7–5, 4–6, 11–9, 4–6, 6–3
1931	(Australia) Harry Hopman	(Australia) Richard Schlesinger	6–4, 6–4, 5–7, 6–2
1932	(Australia) Adrian Quist	(Australia) Reg Ewin	6–1, 6–1, 8–6
1933	(Australia) Reg Ewin	(Australia) Ronald Ford	6–4, 6–0, 6–0
1934	(Australia) Max Carpenter	(Australia) Donald Harris	6–0, 3–6, 6–2, 8–10, 6–2
1935	(Australia) William Stephen	(Australia) Ronald Ford	7–5, 6–3, 6–2
1936	(Australia) Harry Jacoby	(Australia) Gordon Davis	9–7, 6–3, 6–1
1937	(Australia) William Stephen	(Australia) Arthur Huxley	4–6, 6–3, 6–0, 6–3
1938	(Australia) Gordon Davis	(Australia) William Stephen	4–6, 6–4, 6–3, 5–7, 6–4
1939	(Australia) Norman Wasley	(Australia) William Stephen	6–1, 10–8, 3–6, 3–6, 6–4
1940	(Australia) Colin Long	(Australia) Max Bonner	6–3, 6–3, 6–2
1941	(Australia) Max Bonner	(Australia) Harry Jacoby	6–8, 6–0, 6–3, 1–6, 6–2
1942– 1945	Not held (due to World War II)		
1946	(Australia) Dinny Pails	(Australia) Max Bonner	6–0, 6–1, 6–0
1947	(Australia) Lionel Brodie	(Australia) Max Bonner	6–2, 6–2, 6–3
1948	(Australia) Frank Sedgman	(Australia) Colin Long	6–4, 6–2, 6–4
1949	(Australia) Bill Sidwell	(Australia) Robert McCarthy	6–0, 6–2, 3–6, 6–1
1950	(Australia) Frank Sedgman	(Australia) Clive Wilderspin	6–0, 6–2, 6–1
1951	(Australia) Ken McGregor	(Australia) Mervyn Rose	3–6, 7–5, 6–3, 6–4
1952	(Australia) Rex Hartwig	(Australia) Clive Wilderspin	12–10, 6–3, 1–6, 2–6, 6–1
1953	(Australia) Ken Rosewall	(Australia) Don Candy	6–3, 6–4, 6–2
1954	(Australia) Clive Wilderspin	(Australia) Ashley Cooper	6–2, 6–1, 6–3
1955	(Australia) Rex Hartwig	(Australia) Clive Wilderspin	6–2, 6–4, 6–0
1956	(Australia) Clive Wilderspin	(Australia) Mervyn Rose	4–6, 10–8, 6–2, 6–2
1957	(Australia) Ashley Cooper	(Australia) Clive Wilderspin	3–6, 6–4, 3–6, 6–4, 7–5
1958	(Australia) Mal Anderson	(Australia) Neale Fraser	6–2, 4–6, 6–2, 6–4
1959	(Spain) Andres Gimeno	(United States) Butch Buchholz	6–1, 6–4, 6–3
1960	(Australia) Neale Fraser	(Australia) Robert Howe	8–6, 8–6, 7–5
1961	(Australia) Roy Emerson	(Australia) Neale Fraser	6–2, 6–0, 6–2
1962	(Australia) Bob Hewitt	(Australia) Neale Fraser	6–4, 6–3, 5–7, 4–6, 11–9
1963	(Australia) Fred Stolle	(Australia) John Newcombe	7–5, 7–5, 6–8, 6–4
1965	(Australia) Roy Emerson	(France) Pierre Darmon	9–7, 6–3, 6–4
1966	(United States) Arthur Ashe	(United States) Cliff Richey	3–6, 6–2, 6–3, 6–4
1967	(Australia) Tony Roche	(Australia) Bill Bowrey	6–3, 1–6, 9–7, 9–7
1968	(Australia) Bill Bowrey	(Australia) Ray Ruffels	6–8, 11–9, 6–2, 17–19, 6–4
1969	(United States) Marty Riessen	(Australia) Ken Rosewall	6–3, 6–4, 2–6, 2–6, 6–1
1970	(Australia) Allan Stone	(Australia) Phil Dent	6–3, 6–3, 9–7
1971	(Soviet Union) Alex Metreveli	(Australia) John Alexander	7–5, 6–2, 6–2
1972	(Soviet Union) Alex Metreveli	(Australia) John Cooper	6–2, 3–6, 6–4, 6–1
1972	(France) Patrick Proisy	(France) Wanaro N'Godrella	7–6, 6–4, 6–3
1973	(Australia) Colin Dibley	(Australia) Bob Giltinan	6–1, 7–6, 3–6, 6–3
1974	(Australia) Ross Case	(Australia) Geoff Masters	6–4, 7–6, 4–6, 7–6
1975	(Australia) Ray Ruffels	(United Kingdom) John Lloyd	6–1, 6–7, 6–0, 6–3
1976	(Australia) Ray Ruffels	(Australia) Ross Case	6–0, 7–5, 6–3
1978	(Australia) John Marks	(Australia) Bob Carmichael	6–2, 6–7, 4–6, 6–4, 14-12
1979	(Australia) Mark Edmondson	(Australia) John Marks	4–6, 7–6, 6–1
1980	(Australia) Colin Dibley	(United States) Chris Delaney	6–2, 6–4
1981	(Australia) John Fitzgerald	(Australia) Syd Ball	6–2, 6–2
1982	(South Africa) Eddie Edwards	(Australia) Craig A. Miller	6–3, 6–2
1983	(Australia) Wally Masur	(United States) Juan Farrow	6–2, 4–6, 7–5
1984	(South Africa) Brian Levine	(United States) Lloyd Bourne	6–1, 6–2

=== Women's singles ===
(incomplete roll)

Year	Champions	Runners-up	Score
1971	(Australia) Margaret Court	(United Kingdom) Virginia Wade	6–1, 6–2
1972 (February)	(Australia) Evonne Goolagong	(Soviet Union) Olga Morozova	6–2, 7–5
1972 (December)	(Australia) Margaret Court	(Australia) Evonne Goolagong	6–3, 6–2
1974	(Australia) Margaret Court	(Soviet Union) Olga Morozova	6–4, 7–5
1975	(West Germany) Helga Niessen Masthoff	(Australia) Lesley Turner Bowrey	6–2, 3–6, 6–3

=== Women's doubles ===
(incomplete roll)

Year	Champions	Runners-up	Score
1971	(Australia) Margaret Court (Australia) Evonne Goolagong	(United Kingdom) Winnie Shaw (United Kingdom) Virginia Wade	6–4, 7–5
1972 (February)	(Australia) Evonne Goolagong (Australia) Barbara Hawcroft	(Soviet Union) Olga Morozova (Australia) Janet Young	3–6, 6–4, 6–3
1972 (December)	Not held		
1974	(Soviet Union) Olga Morozova (Czechoslovakia) Martina Navratilova	(Australia) Lesley Hunt (Japan) Kazuko Sawamatsu	6–1, 6–3
1975	(Australia) Lesley Turner Bowrey (Australia) Christine Matison	(United Kingdom) Sue Barker (United Kingdom) Michelle Tyler	6–3, 6–3
