= 2013 French Open – Men's singles =

Men's singles
- 2013 French Open

Final
- Champion: (Spain) Rafael Nadal
- Runner-up: (Spain) David Ferrer
- Score: 6–3, 6–2, 6–3

Events
Singles	men	women		boys	girls
Doubles	men	women	mixed	boys	girls
WC Singles	men	women	quad
WC Doubles	men	women	quad
Legends	−45	45+	women
- French Open

Three-time defending champion Rafael Nadal defeated David Ferrer in the final, 6–3, 6–2, 6–3 to win the men's singles tennis title at the 2013 French Open. It was his record-extending eighth French Open title and twelfth major title overall. Nadal also became the first man to win a major eight times, and tied Roy Emerson for the third-most major titles of all time.

In the semifinal encounter between Nadal and Novak Djokovic, they played a notable 4 hour, 37 minute match. A significant part of the Djokovic–Nadal rivalry, it was dubbed by some commentators as the best clay court match ever, and one of the greatest matches ever played; Nadal outlasted Djokovic to win 6–4, 3–6, 6–1, 6–7^{(3–7)}, 9–7. With his semifinal win over Djokovic, Nadal recorded his 58th French Open match win, surpassing the previous record of 57 held by Guillermo Vilas, which Roger Federer matched with his fourth round win.

This was the first all-Spanish major final since 2002, and the first occasion since 2004 that two compatriots contested a major final. Despite the victory, Nadal dropped one place down the rankings to world No. 5 following Ferrer's run to the final. As of 2 May 2026, it is the most recent all-countrymen singles final.

Federer was attempting to become the first man in the Open Era to achieve a double career Grand Slam, but he lost to Jo-Wilfried Tsonga in the quarterfinals.

== Seeds ==
1. (Serbia) Novak Djokovic (semifinals)
2. (Switzerland) Roger Federer (quarterfinals)
3. (Spain) Rafael Nadal (champion)
4. (Spain) David Ferrer (final)
5. (Czech Republic) Tomáš Berdych (first round)
6. (France) Jo-Wilfried Tsonga (semifinals)
7. (France) Richard Gasquet (fourth round)
8. (Serbia) Janko Tipsarević (third round)
9. (Switzerland) Stan Wawrinka (quarterfinals)
10. (Croatia) Marin Čilić (third round)
11. (Spain) Nicolás Almagro (fourth round)
12. (Germany) Tommy Haas (quarterfinals)
13. (Japan) Kei Nishikori (fourth round)
14. (Canada) Milos Raonic (third round)
15. (France) Gilles Simon (fourth round)
16. (Germany) Philipp Kohlschreiber (fourth round)

17. (Argentina) Juan Mónaco (first round)
18. (United States) Sam Querrey (third round)
19. (United States) John Isner (third round)
20. (Italy) Andreas Seppi (third round)
21. (Poland) Jerzy Janowicz (third round)
22. (Ukraine) Alexandr Dolgopolov (first round)
23. (South Africa) Kevin Anderson (fourth round)
24. (France) Benoît Paire (third round)
25. (France) Jérémy Chardy (third round)
26. (Bulgaria) Grigor Dimitrov (third round)
27. (Italy) Fabio Fognini (third round)
28. (Germany) Florian Mayer (first round, retired)
29. (Russia) Mikhail Youzhny (fourth round)
30. (France) Julien Benneteau (third round)
31. (Spain) Marcel Granollers (first round)
32. (Spain) Tommy Robredo (quarterfinals)

Click on the seed number of a player to go to their draw section.

== Draw ==
Key

- Q = Qualifier
- WC = Wild card
- LL = Lucky loser
- Alt = Alternate
- ITF = ITF entry
- PR = Protected ranking
- SR = Special ranking
- SE = Special exempt
- JE = Junior exempt
- JR = Junior Accelerator Programme entrant
- CO = College Accelerator Programme entrant
- NG = Next Gen Accelerator Program entrant
- w/o = Walkover
- r = Retired
- d = Defaulted

=== Finals ===
Quarterfinals
1	(Serbia) Novak Djokovic	6	7^{7}	7
12	(Germany) Tommy Haas	3	6^{5}	5
3	(Spain) Rafael Nadal	6	6	6
9	(Switzerland) Stan Wawrinka	2	3	1
32	(Spain) Tommy Robredo	2	1	1
4	(Spain) David Ferrer	6	6	6
6	(France) Jo-Wilfried Tsonga	7	6	6
2	(Switzerland) Roger Federer	5	3	3

Semifinals
1	(Serbia) Novak Djokovic	4	6	1	7^{7}	7
3	(Spain) Rafael Nadal	6	3	6	6^{3}	9
4	(Spain) David Ferrer	6	7^{7}	6
6	(France) Jo-Wilfried Tsonga	1	6^{3}	2

Final
3	(Spain) Rafael Nadal	6	6	6
4	(Spain) David Ferrer	3	2	3

=== Top half ===
==== Section 1 ====
First round
1	(Serbia) N Djokovic	7^{7}	6	7
(Belgium) D Goffin	6^{5}	4	5
(Croatia) I Dodig	6	4	3	6	10
(Argentina) G Pella	4	6	6	2	12
WC	(United States) Al Kuznetsov	1	6^{2}	2
WC	(France) L Pouille	6	7^{7}	6
(Colombia) A Falla	4	0^{r}
26	(Bulgaria) G Dimitrov	6	1
22	(Ukraine) A Dolgopolov	6^{7}	4	6^{7}
(Russia) D Tursunov	7^{9}	6	7^{9}
(Australia) B Tomic	5	6^{8}	1^{r}
(Romania) V Hănescu	7	7^{10}	2
(Italy) S Bolelli	4	4	1^{r}
(Chinese Taipei) Y-h Lu	6	6	2
Q	(Czech Republic) J Veselý	6^{3}	6	5	2
16	(Germany) P Kohlschreiber	7^{7}	1	7	6

Second round
1	(Serbia) N Djokovic	6	6	6
(Argentina) G Pella	2	0	2
WC	(France) L Pouille	1	6^{4}	1
26	(Bulgaria) G Dimitrov	6	7^{7}	6
(Russia) D Tursunov	4	6^{r}
(Romania) V Hănescu	6	6
(Chinese Taipei) Y-h Lu
16	(Germany) P Kohlschreiber	w/o

Third round
1	(Serbia) N Djokovic	6	6	6
26	(Bulgaria) G Dimitrov	2	2	3
(Romania) V Hănescu	0	6^{0}	1
16	(Germany) P Kohlschreiber	6	7^{7}	6

Fourth round
1	(Serbia) N Djokovic	4	6	6	6
16	(Germany) P Kohlschreiber	6	3	4	4

==== Section 2 ====
First round
12	(Germany) T Haas	7^{7}	6	6
(France) G Rufin	6^{4}	1	3
Q	(United States) J Sock	6	6	7
(Spain) G García-López	2	2	5
(Russia) A Kuznetsov	3	4	6^{4}
(United States) R Harrison	6	6	7^{7}
(Argentina) C Berlocq	3	4	4
19	(United States) J Isner	6	6	6
29	(Russia) M Youzhny	4	6	6	6
(Spain) P Andújar	6	4	2	3
(Argentina) F Delbonis	6^{2}	6	6	6
Q	(Germany) J Reister	7^{7}	1	0	4
(Spain) F Verdasco	6	6	6
WC	(France) M Gicquel	2	3	1
WC	(France) N Mahut	2	6^{4}	1
8	(Serbia) J Tipsarević	6	7^{7}	6

Second round
12	(Germany) T Haas	7^{7}	6	7
Q	(United States) J Sock	6^{3}	2	5
(United States) R Harrison	7	7^{9}	3	1	6
19	(United States) J Isner	5	6^{7}	6	6	8
29	(Russia) M Youzhny	6	6^{5}	7	6
(Argentina) F Delbonis	3	7^{7}	5	4
(Spain) F Verdasco	6^{3}	1	6	7	6
8	(Serbia) J Tipsarević	7^{7}	6	3	5	8

Third round
12	(Germany) T Haas	7	7^{7}	4	6^{10}	10
19	(United States) J Isner	5	6^{4}	6	7^{12}	8
29	(Russia) M Youzhny	6	6	6
8	(Serbia) J Tipsarević	4	4	3

Fourth round
12	(Germany) T Haas	6	6	6
29	(Russia) M Youzhny	1	1	3

==== Section 3 ====
First round
3	(Spain) R Nadal	4	7^{7}	6	6
(Germany) D Brands	6	6^{4}	4	3
(Slovakia) M Kližan	3	6	6	0
(United States) M Russell	6	3	1	0^{r}
Q	(Spain) P Riba	3	4	4
(Czech Republic) L Rosol	6	6	6
Q	(Germany) A Beck	3	5	3
27	(Italy) F Fognini	6	7	6
24	(France) B Paire	3	7^{7}	6	6
(Cyprus) M Baghdatis	6	6^{1}	4	4
(Poland) Ł Kubot	6	5	7^{9}	6
Q	(France) M Teixeira	4	7	6^{7}	2
(Slovenia) G Žemlja	6	6	6
(Colombia) S Giraldo	1	4	1
(Canada) J Levine	3	2	0
13	(Japan) K Nishikori	6	6	6

Second round
3	(Spain) R Nadal	4	6	6	6
(Slovakia) M Kližan	6	3	3	3
(Czech Republic) L Rosol	2	6^{3}	6	1
27	(Italy) F Fognini	6	7^{7}	2	6
24	(France) B Paire	7^{7}	6	6
(Poland) Ł Kubot	6^{2}	2	4
(Slovenia) G Žemlja	1	7	1	4
13	(Japan) K Nishikori	6	5	6	6

Third round
3	(Spain) R Nadal	7^{7}	6	6
27	(Italy) F Fognini	6^{5}	4	4
24	(France) B Paire	3	7^{7}	4	1
13	(Japan) K Nishikori	6	6^{3}	6	6

Fourth round
3	(Spain) R Nadal	6	6	6
13	(Japan) K Nishikori	4	1	3

==== Section 4 ====
First round
9	(Switzerland) S Wawrinka	7	6	6^{1}	7
(Netherlands) T de Bakker	5	3	7^{7}	5
Q	(Canada) V Pospisil	6^{9}	4	7^{7}	6	6
(Argentina) H Zeballos	7^{11}	6	6^{4}	2	8
(France) K de Schepper	4	6^{3}	6	3
(Netherlands) R Haase	6	7^{7}	2	6
(Spain) A Ramos	6^{3}	5	3
21	(Poland) J Janowicz	7^{7}	7	6
28	(Germany) F Mayer	6	3	5^{r}
(Uzbekistan) D Istomin	4	6	7
WC	(France) F Serra	3	4	5
(Russia) N Davydenko	6	6	7
Q	(Poland) M Przysiężny	6	6^{5}	7	7
LL	(United States) R Williams	3	7^{7}	5	5
(Ukraine) S Stakhovsky	1	4	3
7	(France) R Gasquet	6	6	6

Second round
9	(Switzerland) S Wawrinka	6	7^{7}	6
(Argentina) H Zeballos	2	6^{2}	4
(Netherlands) R Haase	4	6	4	3
21	(Poland) J Janowicz	6	4	6	6
(Uzbekistan) D Istomin	4	5	2
(Russia) N Davydenko	6	7	6
Q	(Poland) M Przysiężny	3	3	0
7	(France) R Gasquet	6	6	6

Third round
9	(Switzerland) S Wawrinka	6	6^{2}	6	6
21	(Poland) J Janowicz	3	7^{7}	3	3
(Russia) N Davydenko	4	4	3
7	(France) R Gasquet	6	6	6

Fourth round
9	(Switzerland) S Wawrinka	6^{5}	4	6	7	8
7	(France) R Gasquet	7^{7}	6	4	5	6

=== Bottom half ===
==== Section 5 ====
First round
5	(Czech Republic) T Berdych	6^{8}	4	7^{7}	7^{7}	5
WC	(France) G Monfils	7^{10}	6	6^{3}	6^{4}	7
(Latvia) E Gulbis	6	7^{7}	6
(Brazil) R Dutra da Silva	1	6^{4}	3
(Netherlands) I Sijsling	6	6	6
(Austria) J Melzer	4	3	2
PR	(Estonia) J Zopp	3	2	1
32	(Spain) T Robredo	6	6	6
20	(Italy) A Seppi	6^{4}	6	6	6^{2}	6
(Argentina) L Mayer	7^{7}	4	3	7^{7}	4
(Slovenia) B Kavčič	6	6	6
Q	(Australia) J Duckworth	2	2	2
(Argentina) M Alund	2	6	1	0
(France) É Roger-Vasselin	6	4	6	6
LL	(Austria) A Haider-Maurer	6	4	3	3
11	(Spain) N Almagro	4	6	6	6

Second round
WC	(France) G Monfils	6^{5}	6	7^{7}	6
(Latvia) E Gulbis	7^{7}	4	6^{4}	2
(Netherlands) I Sijsling	7^{7}	6	3	1	1
32	(Spain) T Robredo	6^{2}	4	6	6	6
20	(Italy) A Seppi	6	7^{7}	6^{2}	4	6
(Slovenia) B Kavčič	0	6^{3}	7^{7}	6	3
(France) É Roger-Vasselin	2	4	3
11	(Spain) N Almagro	6	6	6

Third round
WC	(France) G Monfils	6	7^{7}	2	6^{3}	2
32	(Spain) T Robredo	2	6^{5}	6	7^{7}	6
20	(Italy) A Seppi	6^{1}	0	4
11	(Spain) N Almagro	7^{7}	6	6

Fourth round
32	(Spain) T Robredo	6^{5}	3	6	6	6
11	(Spain) N Almagro	7^{7}	6	4	4	4

==== Section 6 ====
First round
14	(Canada) M Raonic	6	6	4	6
(Belgium) X Malisse	2	1	6	4
Q	(Belgium) S Darcis	4	6	1	4
(France) M Llodra	6	4	6	6
Q	(Germany) J-L Struff	6^{7}	6	6^{2}	2
(Russia) E Donskoy	7^{9}	2	7^{7}	6
LL	(Ukraine) I Marchenko	3	5	4
23	(South Africa) K Anderson	6	7	6
31	(Spain) M Granollers	5	6	4	6	4
(Spain) F López	7	2	6	4	6
(Portugal) J Sousa	6	6	6
(Japan) G Soeda	1	3	2
Q	(United States) S Johnson	4	6	3	6	1
(Spain) A Montañés	6	3	6	3	6
(Australia) M Matosevic	4	3	4
4	(Spain) D Ferrer	6	6	6

Second round
14	(Canada) M Raonic	7	3	7^{7}	6
(France) M Llodra	5	6	6^{3}	2
(Russia) E Donskoy	7^{10}	1	5	2
23	(South Africa) K Anderson	6^{8}	6	7	6
(Spain) F López	3	6	6	6
(Portugal) J Sousa	6	3	4	4
(Spain) A Montañés	2	1	3
4	(Spain) D Ferrer	6	6	6

Third round
14	(Canada) M Raonic	5	6^{4}	3
23	(South Africa) K Anderson	7	7^{7}	6
(Spain) F López	1	5	4
4	(Spain) D Ferrer	6	7	6

Fourth round
23	(South Africa) K Anderson	3	1	1
4	(Spain) D Ferrer	6	6	6

==== Section 7 ====
First round
6	(France) J-W Tsonga	6	6	6
(Slovenia) A Bedene	2	2	3
(Finland) J Nieminen	6	4	7^{11}	4	6
(France) P-H Mathieu	4	6	6^{9}	6	2
(Spain) R Bautista-Agut	6	6	6
(Luxembourg) G Müller	3	4	2
(Germany) B Becker	4	2	5
25	(France) J Chardy	6	6	7
17	(Argentina) J Mónaco	6	6	6^{4}	4	4
(Spain) D Gimeno-Traver	4	4	7^{7}	6	6
(Serbia) V Troicki	6	6	6
(United States) J Blake	4	2	2
(Czech Republic) R Štěpánek	6^{4}	6^{8}	6^{11}
WC	(Australia) N Kyrgios	7^{7}	7^{10}	7^{13}
(Germany) P Petzschner	1	2	3
10	(Croatia) M Čilić	6	6	6

Second round
6	(France) J-W Tsonga	7^{8}	6	6
(Finland) J Nieminen	6^{6}	4	3
(Spain) R Bautista-Agut	1	5	4
25	(France) J Chardy	6	7	6
(Spain) D Gimeno-Traver	6	6^{4}	0	7^{9}	4
(Serbia) V Troicki	4	7^{7}	6	6^{7}	6
WC	(Australia) N Kyrgios	4	2	2
10	(Croatia) M Čilić	6	6	6

Third round
6	(France) J-W Tsonga	6	6	7
25	(France) J Chardy	1	2	5
(Serbia) V Troicki	7^{14}	6	7
10	(Croatia) M Čilić	6^{12}	4	5

Fourth round
6	(France) J-W Tsonga	6	6	6
(Serbia) V Troicki	3	3	3

==== Section 8 ====
First round
15	(France) G Simon	3	1	6	6	7
(Australia) L Hewitt	6	6	4	1	5
WC	(France) A Mannarino	3	6	3	7	5
PR	(Uruguay) P Cuevas	6	2	6	5	7
(Czech Republic) J Hájek	6	5	6	6
Q	(United States) D Kudla	2	7	0	4
(Slovakia) L Lacko	3	4	4
18	(United States) S Querrey	6	6	6
30	(France) J Benneteau	7^{7}	6	5	7^{7}
(Lithuania) R Berankis	6^{5}	3	7	6^{5}
(Germany) T Kamke	6	6	3	0	6
(Italy) P Lorenzi	3	3	6	6	3
Q	(India) S Devvarman	6	6	7
Q	(Spain) D Muñoz de la Nava	3	3	5
Q	(Spain) P Carreño-Busta	2	2	3
2	(Switzerland) R Federer	6	6	6

Second round
15	(France) G Simon	6^{2}	6	6	6
PR	(Uruguay) P Cuevas	7^{7}	1	1	1
(Czech Republic) J Hájek	4	5	4
18	(United States) S Querrey	6	7	6
30	(France) J Benneteau	7^{11}	7	5	0	6
(Germany) T Kamke	6^{9}	5	7	6	4
Q	(India) S Devvarman	2	1	1
2	(Switzerland) R Federer	6	6	6

Third round
15	(France) G Simon	2	6	2	7^{7}	6
18	(United States) S Querrey	6	3	6	6^{2}	2
30	(France) J Benneteau	3	4	5
2	(Switzerland) R Federer	6	6	7

Fourth round
15	(France) G Simon	1	6	6	2	3
2	(Switzerland) R Federer	6	4	2	6	6

== Road to the final ==
For the first time in his career, Rafael Nadal lost a set in both of the first two rounds. In the semi-finals, he faced off against world number one Novak Djokovic. In an epic five setter, Nadal triumphed 6–4, 3–6, 6–1, 6–7 (3–7), 9–7.

David Ferrer advanced to the final of a Grand Slam for the first time in his career. He did not lose a single set in the tournament before the final.

== Final ==
Third-seeded Nadal from Spain faced off against fourth-seeded David Ferrer in the finals of the French Open. Both players employed the same strategy, trying to win points from the baseline. Nadal won a break early in the first set, but lost it back quickly and had to fend off two other break points during the set. Nadal ending up winning the first set 6–3. Down 3–1 in the second set, Ferrer had four break points to get back into the set. However, Nadal fought them all off, winning the last point on a 31-shot rally, the longest of the match. From there he cruised to a 6–2 set victory. Aided by a Ferrer double fault on break point, Nadal took the third set 6–3 for a three set to none victory.

Nadal had been dominant on clay during his career, but took seven months off from mid-2012 to February 2013 to recover from a knee injury. He showed few signs of the injury during the final as he tracked down balls from corner to corner and hit numerous topspin-laden winners. "This one is very special one," said Nadal after the match. "When you have period of time like I had, you realize that you don't know if you will have the chance to be back here with this trophy another time."

The two-hour sixteen-minute match was briefly interrupted by noisy protesters, one of whom ran onto the court with a lit flare. Tournament director Gilbert Ysern said security "acted efficiently and quickly and handled [the situation] very well." Both players appeared to be rattled by the event, dropping serve immediately after it. "I felt a little bit scared at the first moment because I didn't see what's going on. I just turned there and I watch a guy with some fire," remarked Nadal. Ferrer said the event did not affect his play. Ten people were arrested in total.

With his win, Nadal became the first man to win the same Grand Slam event eight times. It was his 12th major overall, putting him tied for third on the all-time list behind Roger Federer (17) and Pete Sampras (14). With his victory Nadal's record was 59–1 all time in Paris. Nadal broke the men's record for most victories at the French Open and improved to 20–4 against Ferrer.

Preceded by 2013 Australian Open – Men's singles	Grand Slam men's singles	Succeeded by 2013 Wimbledon Championships – Men's singles
