= Clarence Treloar =

Australian tennis player (1892–1966)

- Full name: Clarence Leslie Treloar
- Country (sports): Australia
- Born: 1892; New South Wales, Australia
- Died: 1966 (aged 73); Perth, Western Australia, Australia
- Turned pro: 1933 (amateur tour from 1913)
- Retired: 1933

Singles

Grand Slam singles results
- Australian Open: SF (1921)

Doubles

Grand Slam doubles results
- Australian Open: QF (1921, 1924)

Clarence Treloar (1892 – 1966) was an Australian tennis player in the 1920s. "Clarrie", as he was known, was a popular player renowned for his tenacity. Although born in New South Wales, he settled in Western Australia in 1915 and in the 1920s was one of Perth's best known businessmen as City Sales manager for T M Burke Pty. Ltd. During the 1920s Treloar was the second best player in the State behind Rice Gemmell (Gemmell turned professional in 1927). Treloar was a semi finalists at the Australasian Championships singles at Perth in 1921 (losing to Rice Gemmell). Treloar won the South Australian and Western Australian hard court championships. Treloar was seven times runner up in the Western Australian State Championships (five times to Gemmell, once to R. W. Phillips and once to R. D. Ford), losing every final in five sets. In 1933, Treloar became a professional tennis coach and was in high demand for his services. Treloar was a fine golfer, played bowls and was also President of the West Australian Darts Association.
