= 1921 Australasian Championships =

- Date: 26–31 December 1921
- Edition: 14th
- Category: Grand Slam (ITF)
- Surface: Grass
- Location: Perth, Western Australia, Australia
- Venue: Kitchener Park

Champions

Singles
- (Australia) Rice Gemmell

Doubles
- (Australia) Stanley Eaton / (Australia) Rice Gemmell
- Australasian Championships

The 1921 Australasian Championships was a tennis tournament that took place on outdoor Grass courts at the Kitchener Park, Perth, Australia, from 26 December to 31 December. It was the 14th edition of the Australian Championships (now known as the Australian Open), the 3rd held in Perth, and the third Grand Slam tournament of the year. The single titles was won by Australian Rice Gemmell.

== Finals ==
=== Singles ===
(Australia) Rice Gemmell defeated (Australia) Alf Hedeman 7–5, 6–1, 6–4

=== Doubles ===
(Australia) Stanley Eaton / (Australia) Rice Gemmell defeated (Australia) N. Brearley / (Australia) Edward Stokes 7–5, 6–3, 6–3

Preceded by 1921 U.S. National Championships	Grand Slams	Succeeded by 1922 Wimbledon Championships
