= Keith McDougall =

Australian tennis player

- Full name: Keith Allister McDougall
- Country (sports): Australia
- Born: 1893; Western Australia
- Died: 1969 (aged 76); Perth, Western Australia
- Turned pro: 1919 (amateur tour)
- Retired: 1930

Singles

Grand Slam singles results
- Australian Open: SF (1921)

Doubles

Grand Slam doubles results
- Australian Open: SF (1921)

Keith McDougall (1893 – 1969) was an Australian tennis player in the 1920s. He was the son of Alexander "Sandy" McDougall, who was known in Perth as a "one-time big racing identity", according to newspaper The Sunday Times of Perth. Keith also played cricket and golf. McDougall was twice Western Australia State doubles champion with Rice Gemmell, despite having a "crippled arm", according to The West Australian newspaper of Perth. McDougall was the secretary of the King's Park Tennis Club in Perth. McDougall's best stroke was his forehand. He was a semi finalist at the Australasian Championships singles held at Perth in 1921, beating R. W. Phillips and W. Hayman before losing to Alf Hedeman. In 1924 McDougall opened a store which sold sports equipment with fellow player Rice Gemmell. In 1927, McDougall partnered the Duke of York (later King George VI) in a doubles tennis match when the Duke visited Australia.
