= 1921 Australasian Championships – Singles =

Singles
- 1921 Australasian Championships

Final
- Champion: (Australia) Rice Gemmell
- Runner-up: (Australia) Alfred Hedeman
- Score: 7–5, 6–1, 6–4

Details
- Draw: 22

Events
Singles	Doubles
- Australasian Championships

Rice Gemmell defeated Alfred Hedeman 7–5, 6–1, 6–4 in the final to win the men's singles tennis title at the 1921 Australasian Championships.

== Draw ==
=== Key ===
- Q = Qualifier
- WC = Wild card
- LL = Lucky loser
- r = Retired

Quarterfinals
(Australia) Rice Gemmell	6	6	6
(Australia) E. M. Barker	0	3	0
(Australia) Clarence Treloar	6	6	6
(Australia) W. Henville	3	2	2
(Australia) Alfred Hedeman	6	6	6
(Australia) Norman Kenneth Brearley	2	1	3
(Australia) Keith McDougall	2	12	6	6
(Australia) W. Hayman	6	10	2	0

Semifinals
(Australia) Rice Gemmell	6	6	6
(Australia) Clarence Treloar	2	1	3
(Australia) Alfred Hedeman	6	3	6	6
(Australia) Keith A. McDougall	4	6	1	2

Finals
(Australia) Rice Gemmell	7	6	6
(Australia) Alfred Hedeman	5	1	4

=== Top half ===
First round
(Australia) C. L. Treloar	6	3	6	6
(Australia) William McLeod Cleland	4	6	1	4
(Australia) Leonard McDaniell	6	6	6
(Australia) Malcolm Plaistowe	2	4	0
(Australia) W. Henville	3	2	8	rtd.
(Australia) P. Mills	6	6	6
(Australia) S. Davis	w/o
(Australia) Edward W. Stokes

Second round
(Australia) R. T. H. Gemmell	6	6	4	6
(Australia) D. Cameron	3	1	6	0
(Australia) E. M. Barker	4	6	6	6
(Australia) Holliday	6	2	4	2
(Australia) C. L. Treloar	7	6	6
(Australia) Leonard McDaniell	5	2	4
(Australia) W. Henville	6	6	7
(Australia) S.Davis	1	3	5

Quarterfinals
(Australia) R. T. H. Gemmell	6	6	6
(Australia) E. M. Barker	0	3	0
(Australia) C. L. Treloar	6	6	6
(Australia) W. Henville	3	2	2

Semifinals
(Australia) R. T. H. Gemmell	6	6	6
(Australia) C. L. Treloar	2	1	3

=== Bottom half ===
First round
(Australia) N. Brearley	6	6	6
(Australia) Sturm	4	3	1
(Australia) Linwood	6	6	6
(Australia) Fairbridge	2	0	0

Second round
(Australia) A. H. Hedeman	6	4	6	6
(Australia) Forsaith	4	6	1	3
(Australia) N. Brearley	3	3	11	6	6
(Australia) Linwood	6	6	9	2	4
(Australia) W. Hayman	2	6	7	5	6
(Australia) McGibbon	6	2	5	7	2
(Australia) K. A. McDougall	4	3	6	6	6
(Australia) Robert Whitelock Phillips	6	6	2	3	4

Quarterfinals
(Australia) A. H. Hedeman	6	6	6
(Australia) Norman Kenneth Brearley	2	1	3
(Australia) K. A. McDougall	2	12	6	6
(Australia) W. Hayman	6	10	2	0

Semifinals
(Australia) A. H. Hedeman	6	3	6	6
(Australia) K. A. McDougall	4	6	1	2

Preceded by 1920 U.S. National Championships – Men's singles	Grand Slam men's singles	Succeeded by 1921 Wimbledon Championships – Men's singles
