= Alf Hedemann =

Australian tennis player

- Full name: Alfred Hugo Hedemann
- Country (sports): Australia
- Born: 1880; New South Wales, Australia
- Died: After 1953

Singles

Grand Slam singles results
- Australian Open: F (1921)

Doubles

Grand Slam doubles results
- Australian Open: W (1913)

Alfred Hedemann was an Australian tennis player. He won the doubles title alongside Ernie Parker at the Australasian Championships, the future Australian Open, in 1913. In the 1921 Australasian championships, held at Perth, Hedemann beat Keith McDougall in the semi-finals before losing to Rice Gemmell in the final. Hedemann worked for the Bank of Australasia. He moved to Tasmania to be manager of the Launceston branch in 1933 and retired in 1940. Hedemann had been a fine cricketer and lacrosse player.

== Grand Slam finals ==
=== Singles (1 runner-up) ===
Result	Year	Championship	Surface	Opponent	Score
Loss	1921	Australasian Championships	Grass	(Australia) Rice Gemmell	7–5, 6–1, 6–4

=== Doubles (1 title) ===
Result	Year	Championship	Surface	Partner	Opponents	Score
Win	1913	Australasian Championships	Grass	(Australia) Ernie Parker	(New Zealand) Harry Parker (Australia) Roy Taylor	8–6, 4–6, 6–4, 6–4
