= Rice Gemmell =

Australian tennis player

- Full name: Rice Thomas Hopkins Gemmell
- Born: 4 March 1896 Caulfield, Victoria, Australia
- Died: 10 May 1972 (aged 76)

Singles

Grand Slam singles results
- Australian Open: W (1921)

Doubles

Grand Slam doubles results
- Australian Open: W (1921)

Mixed doubles

Grand Slam mixed doubles results
- Australian Open: 2R (1926)

Rice Thomas Hopkins Gemmell (1896–1972) was an Australian tennis player.

Born in Caulfield, Victoria, by 1916 he was living in Claremont, Western Australia and was enlisted in World War I as a bombardier. Gemmell is best known for winning the 1921 Australasian Championships men's singles title, held at Perth, where he beat Alf Hedeman in the final. In the same year, he also won the men's doubles title, partnering Stanley Eaton. Gemmell was Western Australia's top player during the 1920s. In 1924 Gemmell opened a store which sold sports equipment with fellow player Keith McDougall. Gemmell turned professional in 1927. In 1932 he became a gold miner and in 1940 he survived a car crash in which the driver of the car died. He died in 1972 and is interred in Tewantin, Queensland.

== Grand Slam finals ==
=== Singles (1 title) ===
Result	Year	Championship	Surface	Opponent	Score
Win	1921	Australasian Championships	Grass	(Australia) Alf Hedeman	7–5, 6–1, 6–4

=== Doubles (1 title) ===
Result	Year	Championship	Surface	Partner	Opponents	Score
Win	1921	Australasian Championships	Grass	(Australia) Stanley Eaton	(Australia) N. Brearley (Australia) Edward Stokes	7–5, 6–3, 6–3
