= List of US Open men's singles champions =

US Open Men's Singles Champions
- Location: Flushing Meadows, Queens; New York City; United States
- Venue: USTA Billie Jean King National Tennis Center
- Governing body: USTA
- Created: 1881
- Editions: 145 Grand Slam events (2025); 58 events (Open Era)
- Surface: Grass (1881–1974); Clay (Note: Played on HarTru surface.) (1975–1977); Hard (Note: Played on DecoTurf surface.) (1978–present)
- Prize money: Total: US$65,000,000 (2023); Winner: US$3,000,000 (2023)
- Trophy: US Open Trophy
- Website: Official website

Most titles
- Amateur era: 7: Richard Sears; 7: William Larned; 7: Bill Tilden
- Open era: 5: Jimmy Connors; 5: Pete Sampras; 5: Roger Federer

Most consecutive titles
- Amateur era: 7: Richard Sears
- Open era: 5: Roger Federer

Current champion
- Alexander Zverev

The US Open men's singles championship is an annual tennis tournament that is part of the US Open (Note: Known as the U.S. National Championships during the Amateur Era.) (Note: The tournament entered the Open Era with the 1968 edition, allowing professional players to compete alongside amateurs.) and was established in 1881. It is played on outdoor hard courts (Note: The US Open specifically uses DecoTurf hard courts, categorized as a "Medium" speed surface by the International Tennis Federation (ITF).) at the USTA Billie Jean King National Tennis Center in Flushing Meadows – Corona Park, New York City, United States. The US Open is played during a two-week period in late August and early September, and has been chronologically the last of the four Grand Slam tournaments of the tennis season since 1987. Newport (1881–1914), Forest Hills (1915–1920, 1924–1977), and Philadelphia (1921–1923) held the event before it settled in 1978 at the USTA National Tennis Center, now the USTA Billie Jean King National Tennis Center, in New York City. The inaugural tournament, in 1881, was reserved for United States National Lawn Tennis Association (USNLTA) club members, before the championships opened to international competitors in 1882. The USTA is the national body that organizes this event.

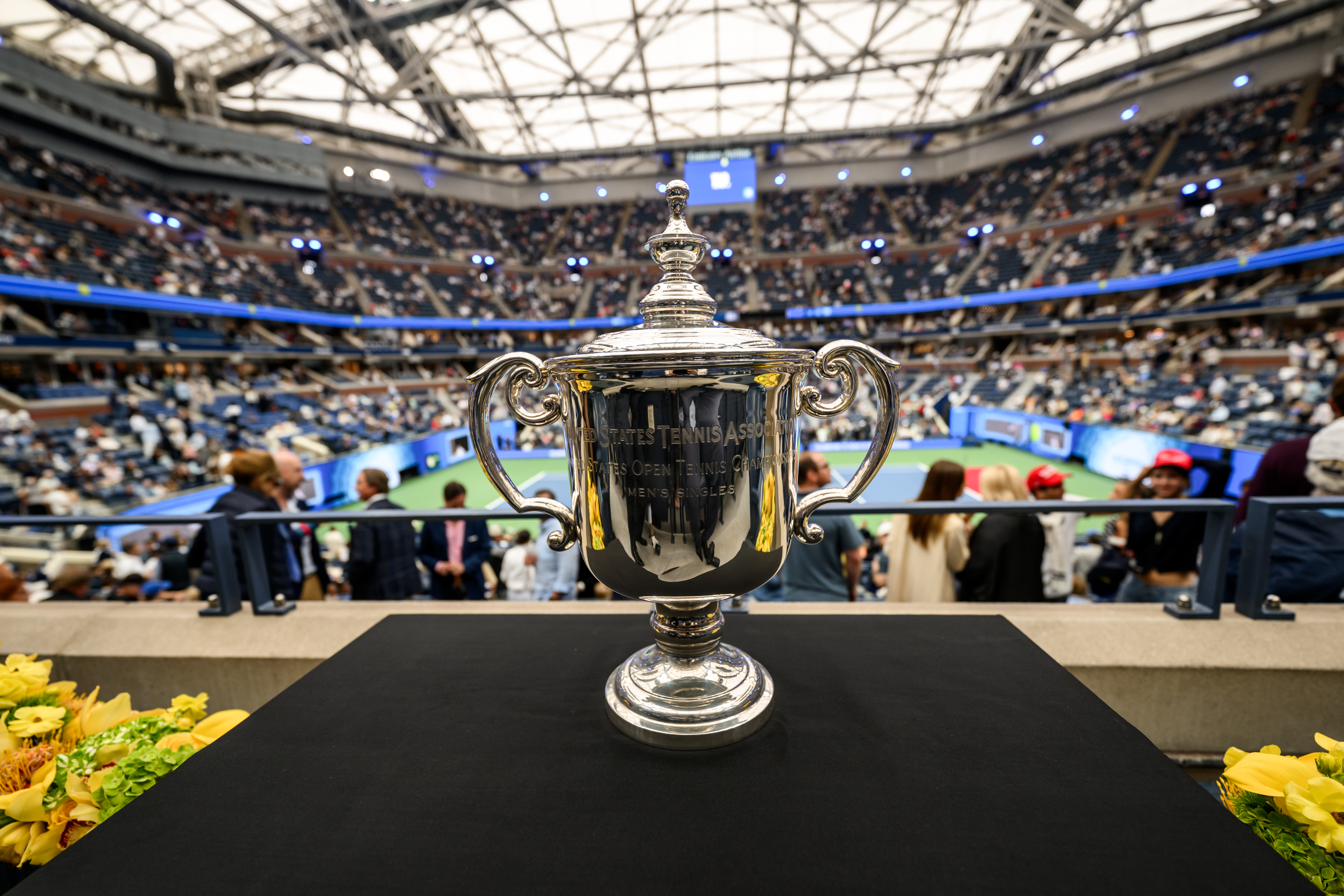
Current Men's singles trophy

== History ==
The men's singles' rules have undergone several changes since the first edition. From 1884 to 1911, the event started with a knockout phase, the All-Comers singles, whose winner faced the defending champion in a challenge round. The All-Comers winner was awarded the title six times (1888, 1893, 1898, 1901, 1904, 1907) in the absence of the previous year's champion. The challenge round system was abolished with the 1912 edition. From 1908 to 1914, when the championships were held at Newport, men's singles draws had exceeded 128 players, but when the event moved to Forest Hills in 1915 entries would be "submitted by clubs, thereby making the clubs weed out mediocre players. Furthermore, the entry fee would be set high enough to prevent cheapskates from entering just to get a seat at the tournament at a lower price and then defaulting". From 1881, all matches but the All-Comers final and the challenge round were played as the best-of-three sets, before the event switched to best-of-five for all rounds in 1886. Best-two-out-of-three-sets matches were reintroduced for early rounds in 1917, from 1943 to 1945, and from 1975 to 1978. Before 1884, the winner of the next game at five-games–all took the set in every match except the All-Comers final and the challenge round, which were won by the player who had at least six games and at least two games more than his opponent. This advantage format was introduced for the final sets of early rounds in 1884, and used for all sets in all rounds from 1887 to 1969. The tie-break system was introduced in 1970 for all sets, in its best-of-nine points sudden death version until 1974, and in its best-of-13 points lingering death version since 1975. In addition, the US Open was the first slam to have a fifth set tie-break.

The court surface changed twice, from grass (1881–1974), to Har-Tru clay (1975–1977), to DecoTurf hard courts, since 1978. The only man to win on all three surfaces, which are grass, Har-Tru clay, and DecoTurf hard was Jimmy Connors.

The champion receives a full-size replica of the event's trophy engraved with his name. In 2010, the winner received prize money of US$1,700,000. A bonus pool of $1,000,000 is also to US Open champions who have clinched the first place of the US Open Series.

In the U.S. National Championships, Richard Sears (1881–1887), William Larned (1901–1902, 1907–1911) and Bill Tilden (1920–1925, 1929) hold the record for most titles in the men's singles, with seven victories each. Four of Sears' wins and all of Larned's, came in a time when the tournament used a challenge round format, and they won respectively only three times and twice after going through a complete draw. Sears also holds the all-time record for most consecutive titles, with seven from (1881 to 1887); the first win came when the event was closed to foreign participants. Without the challenge round, the record stands at six, and is held by Tilden (1920–1925).

During the US Open, since the inclusion of the professional tennis players, Jimmy Connors (1974, 1976, 1978, 1982–1983), Pete Sampras (1990, 1993, 1995–1996, 2002), and Roger Federer (2004–2008) have won the most championships, with five titles. Federer has had the most consecutive wins, with five (2004–2008).

== Champions ==
=== United States National Championships ===
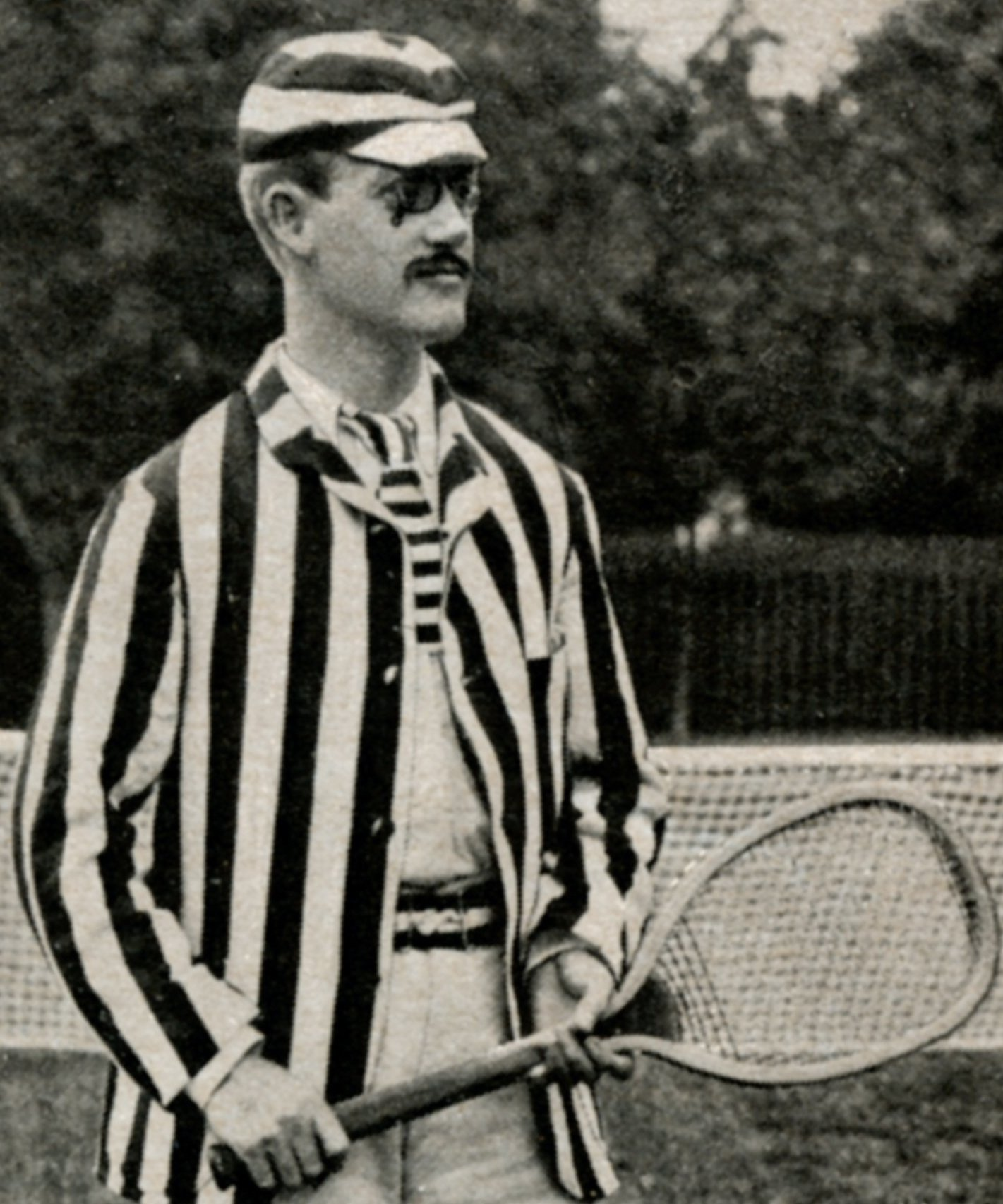
Richard Sears, the champion of the first seven editions of the U.S. Championships.

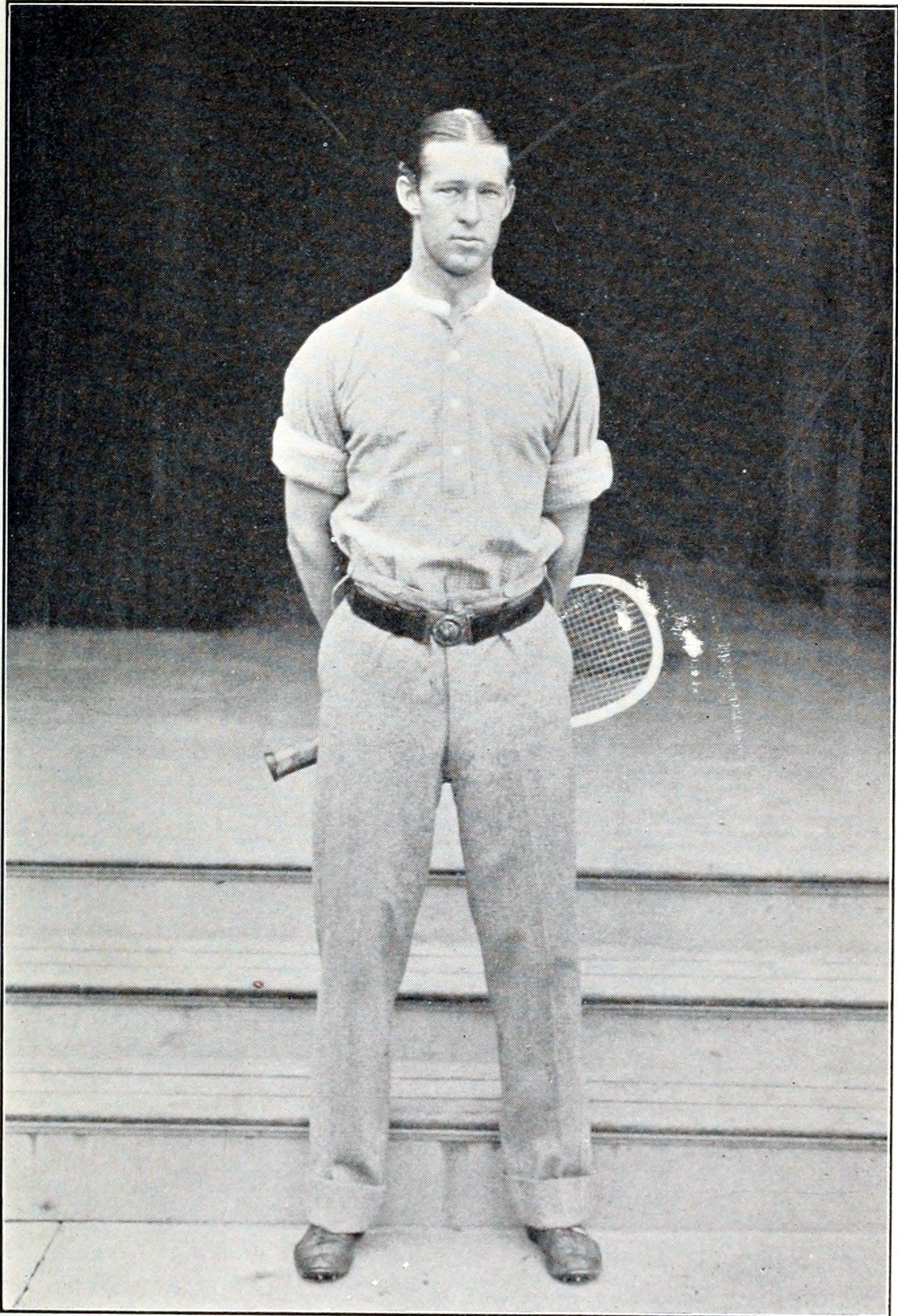
William Larned was the second man to win seven titles at the event.

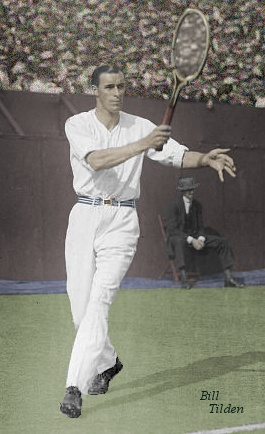
Tilden won six consecutive titles and seven non-challenge round championships in total, an all-time record.

Key
USNLTA clubs members only-event *
All Comers' winner, Challenge round winner ‡
Defending champion, Challenge round winner †
All Comers' winner, no Challenge round ◊

Year	Country	Champion	Country	Runner-up	Score in the final
1881	USA	Richard Sears (1/7) *	BRI	William Glyn	6–0, 6–3, 6–2
1882	USA	Richard Sears (2/7)	USA	Clarence Clark	6–1, 6–4, 6–0
1883	USA	Richard Sears (3/7)	USA	James Dwight	6–2, 6–0, 9–7
1884	USA	Richard Sears (4/7) †	USA	Howard Taylor	6–0, 1–6, 6–0, 6–2
1885	USA	Richard Sears (5/7) †	USA	Godfrey Brinley	6–3, 4–6, 6–0, 6–3
1886	USA	Richard Sears (6/7) †	USA	Robert Livingston Beeckman	4–6, 6–1, 6–3, 6–4
1887	USA	Richard Sears (7/7) †	USA	Henry Slocum	6–1, 6–3, 6–2
1888	USA	Henry Slocum (1/2) ◊	USA	Howard Taylor	6–4, 6–1, 6–0
1889	USA	Henry Slocum (2/2) †	USA	Quincy Shaw	6–3, 6–1, 4–6, 6–2
1890	USA	Oliver Campbell (1/3) ‡	USA	Henry Slocum	6–2, 4–6, 6–3, 6–1
1891	USA	Oliver Campbell (2/3) †	USA	Clarence Hobart	2–6, 7–5, 7–9, 6–1, 6–2
1892	USA	Oliver Campbell (3/3) †	USA	Frederick Hovey	7–5, 3–6, 6–3, 7–5
1893	USA	Robert Wrenn (1/4) ◊	USA	Frederick Hovey	6–4, 3–6, 6–4, 6–4
1894	USA	Robert Wrenn (2/4) †	BRI	Manliffe Goodbody	6–8, 6–1, 6–4, 6–4
1895	USA	Frederick Hovey ‡	USA	Robert Wrenn	6–3, 6–2, 6–4
1896	USA	Robert Wrenn (3/4) ‡	USA	Frederick Hovey	7–5, 3–6, 6–0, 1–6, 6–1
1897	USA	Robert Wrenn (4/4) †	BRI	Wilberforce Eaves	4–6, 8–6, 6–3, 2–6, 6–2
1898	USA	Malcolm Whitman (1/3) ◊	USA	Dwight Davis	3–6, 6–2, 6–2, 6–1
1899	USA	Malcolm Whitman (2/3) †	USA	Jahial Parmly Paret	6–1, 6–2, 3–6, 7–5
1900	USA	Malcolm Whitman (3/3) †	USA	William Larned	6–4, 1–6, 6–2, 6–2
1901	USA	William Larned (1/7) ◊	USA	Beals Wright	6–2, 6–8, 6–4, 6–4
1902	USA	William Larned (2/7) †	BRI	Reginald Doherty	4–6, 6–2, 6–4, 8–6
1903	BRI	Laurence Doherty ‡	USA	William Larned	6–0, 6–3, 10–8
1904	USA	Holcombe Ward ◊	USA	William Clothier	10–8, 6–4, 9–7
1905	USA	Beals Wright ‡	USA	Holcombe Ward	6–2, 6–1, 11–9
1906	USA	William Clothier ‡	USA	Beals Wright	6–3, 6–0, 6–4
1907	USA	William Larned (3/7) ◊	USA	Robert LeRoy	6–2, 6–2, 6–4
1908	USA	William Larned (4/7) †	USA	Beals Wright	6–1, 6–2, 8–6
1909	USA	William Larned (5/7) †	USA	William Clothier	6–1, 6–2, 5–7, 1–6, 6–1
1910	USA	William Larned (6/7) †	USA	Tom Bundy	6–1, 5–7, 6–0, 6–8, 6–1
1911	USA	William Larned (7/7) †	USA	Maurice McLoughlin	6–4, 6–4, 6–2
1912	USA	Maurice McLoughlin (1/2)	USA	Wallace Johnson	3–6, 2–6, 6–2, 6–4, 6–2
1913	USA	Maurice McLoughlin (2/2)	USA	R. Norris Williams	6–4, 5–7, 6–3, 6–1
1914	USA	R. Norris Williams (1/2)	USA	Maurice McLoughlin	6–3, 8–6, 10–8
1915	USA	Bill Johnston (1/2)	USA	Maurice McLoughlin	1–6, 6–0, 7–5, 10–8
1916	USA	R. Norris Williams (2/2)	USA	Bill Johnston	4–6, 6–4, 0–6, 6–2, 6–4
1917 (Note: The 1917 U.S. National Championships, taking place during World War I, were held as a National Patriotic Tournament awarding no prize to the winner.)	USA	Robert Lindley Murray (1/2)	USA	Nathaniel Niles	5–7, 8–6, 6–3, 6–3
1918	USA	Robert Lindley Murray (2/2)	USA	Bill Tilden	6–3, 6–1, 7–5
1919	USA	Bill Johnston (2/2)	USA	Bill Tilden	6–4, 6–4, 6–3
1920	USA	Bill Tilden (1/7)	USA	Bill Johnston	6–1, 1–6, 7–5, 5–7, 6–3
1921	USA	Bill Tilden (2/7)	USA	Wallace Johnson	6–1, 6–3, 6–1
1922	USA	Bill Tilden (3/7)	USA	Bill Johnston	4–6, 3–6, 6–2, 6–3, 6–4
1923	USA	Bill Tilden (4/7)	USA	Bill Johnston	6–4, 6–1, 6–4
1924	USA	Bill Tilden (5/7)	USA	Bill Johnston	6–1, 9–7, 6–2
1925	USA	Bill Tilden (6/7)	USA	Bill Johnston	4–6, 11–9, 6–3, 4–6, 6–3
1926	FRA	René Lacoste (1/2)	FRA	Jean Borotra	6–4, 6–0, 6–4
1927	FRA	René Lacoste (2/2)	USA	Bill Tilden	11–9, 6–3, 11–9
1928	FRA	Henri Cochet	USA	Francis Hunter	4–6, 6–4, 3–6, 7–5, 6–3
1929	USA	Bill Tilden (7/7)	USA	Francis Hunter	3–6, 6–3, 4–6, 6–2, 6–4
1930	USA	John Doeg	USA	Frank Shields	10–8, 1–6, 6–4, 16–14
1931	USA	Ellsworth Vines (1/2)	USA	George Lott	7–9, 6–3, 9–7, 7–5
1932	USA	Ellsworth Vines (2/2)	FRA	Henri Cochet	6–4, 6–4, 6–4
1933	GBR	Fred Perry (1/3)	AUS	Jack Crawford	6–3, 11–13, 4–6, 6–0, 6–1
1934	GBR	Fred Perry (2/3)	USA	Wilmer Allison	6–4, 6–3, 3–6, 1–6, 8–6
1935	USA	Wilmer Allison	USA	Sidney Wood	6–2, 6–2, 6–3
1936	GBR	Fred Perry (3/3)	USA	Don Budge	2–6, 6–2, 8–6, 1–6, 10–8
1937	USA	Don Budge (1/2)	GER	Gottfried von Cramm	6–1, 7–9, 6–1, 3–6, 6–1
1938	USA	Don Budge (2/2)	USA	Gene Mako	6–3, 6–8, 6–2, 6–1
1939	USA	Bobby Riggs (1/2)	USA	Welby Van Horn	6–4, 6–2, 6–4
1940	USA	Don McNeill	USA	Bobby Riggs	4–6, 6–8, 6–3, 6–3, 7–5
1941	USA	Bobby Riggs (2/2)	USA	Frank Kovacs	5–7, 6–1, 6–3, 6–3
1942	USA	Ted Schroeder	USA	Frank Parker	8–6, 7–5, 3–6, 4–6, 6–2
1943	USA	Joseph Hunt	USA	Jack Kramer	6–3, 6–8, 10–8, 6–0
1944	USA	Frank Parker (1/2)	USA	Bill Talbert	6–4, 3–6, 6–3, 6–3
1945	USA	Frank Parker (2/2)	USA	Bill Talbert	14–12, 6–1, 6–2
1946	USA	Jack Kramer (1/2)	USA	Tom Brown	9–7, 6–3, 6–0
1947	USA	Jack Kramer (2/2)	USA	Frank Parker	4–6, 2–6, 6–1, 6–0, 6–3
1948	USA	Pancho Gonzales (1/2)	RSA	Eric Sturgess	6–2, 6–3, 14–12
1949	USA	Pancho Gonzales (2/2)	USA	Ted Schroeder	16–18, 2–6, 6–1, 6–2, 6–4
1950	USA	Arthur Larsen	USA	Herbert Flam	6–3, 4–6, 5–7, 6–4, 6–3
1951	AUS	Frank Sedgman (1/2)	USA	Vic Seixas	6–4, 6–1, 6–1
1952	AUS	Frank Sedgman (2/2)	USA	Gardnar Mulloy	6–1, 6–2, 6–3
1953	USA	Tony Trabert (1/2)	USA	Vic Seixas	6–3, 6–2, 6–3
1954	USA	Vic Seixas	AUS	Rex Hartwig	3–6, 6–2, 6–4, 6–4
1955	USA	Tony Trabert (2/2)	AUS	Ken Rosewall	9–7, 6–3, 6–3
1956	AUS	Ken Rosewall (1/2)	AUS	Lew Hoad	4–6, 6–2, 6–3, 6–3
1957	AUS	Mal Anderson	AUS	Ashley Cooper	10–8, 7–5, 6–4
1958	AUS	Ashley Cooper	AUS	Mal Anderson	6–2, 3–6, 4–6, 10–8, 8–6
1959	AUS	Neale Fraser (1/2)	USA	Alex Olmedo	6–3, 5–7, 6–2, 6–4
1960	AUS	Neale Fraser (2/2)	AUS	Rod Laver	6–4, 6–4, 9–7
1961	AUS	Roy Emerson (1/2)	AUS	Rod Laver	7–5, 6–3, 6–2
1962	AUS	Rod Laver (1/2)	AUS	Roy Emerson	6–2, 6–4, 5–7, 6–4
1963	MEX	Rafael Osuna	USA	Frank Froehling	7–5, 6–4, 6–2
1964	AUS	Roy Emerson (2/2)	AUS	Fred Stolle	6–4, 6–2, 6–4
1965	ESP	Manuel Santana	RSA	Cliff Drysdale	6–2, 7–9, 7–5, 6–1
1966	AUS	Fred Stolle	AUS	John Newcombe	4–6, 12–10, 6–3, 6–4
1967	AUS	John Newcombe (1/2)	USA	Clark Graebner	6–4, 6–4, 8–6

=== US Open ===
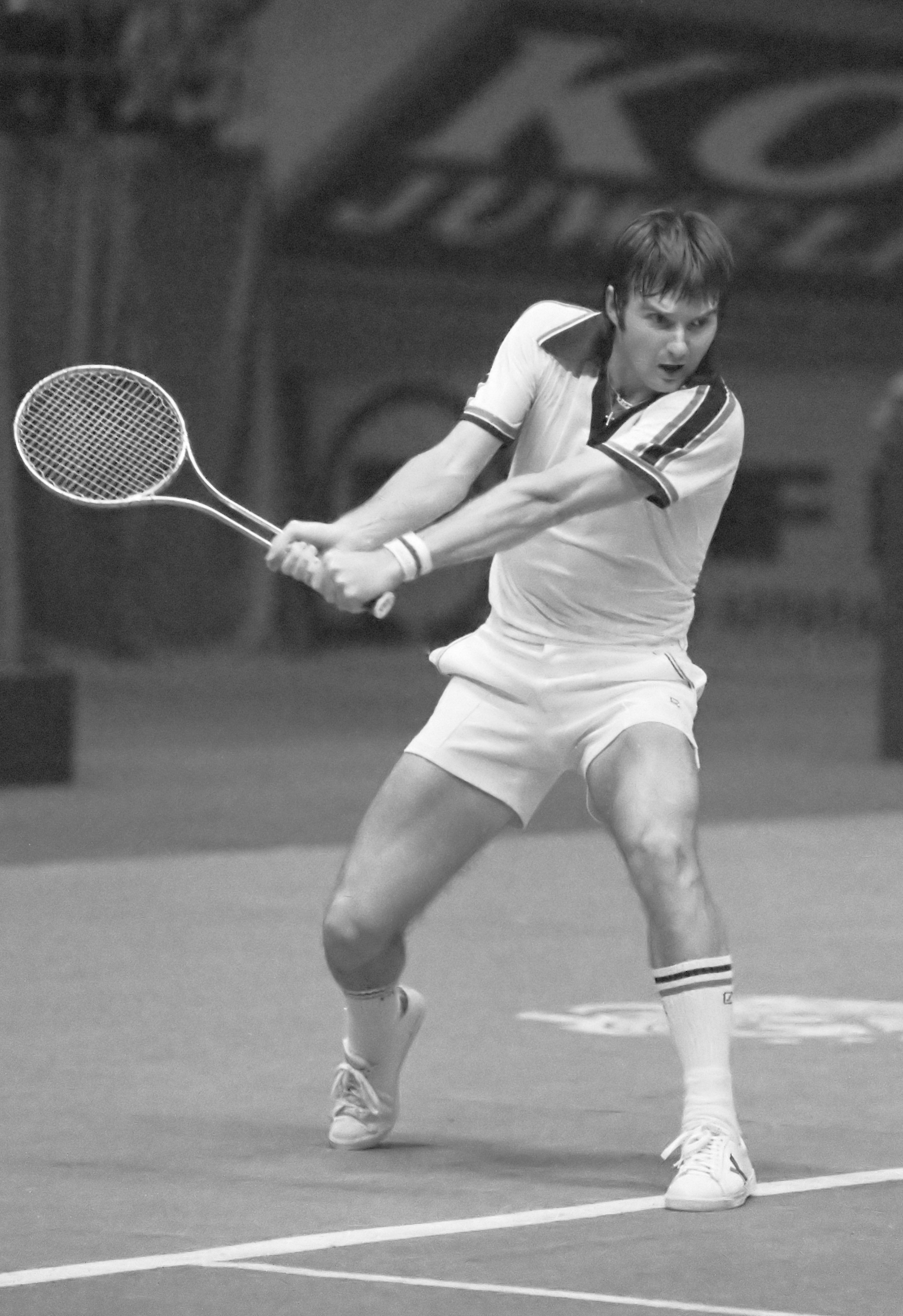
Jimmy Connors won the US Open five times on three different surfaces.

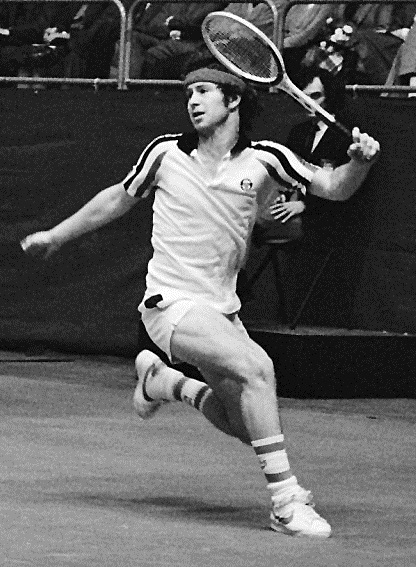
John McEnroe won four of his seven Majors at the US Open.

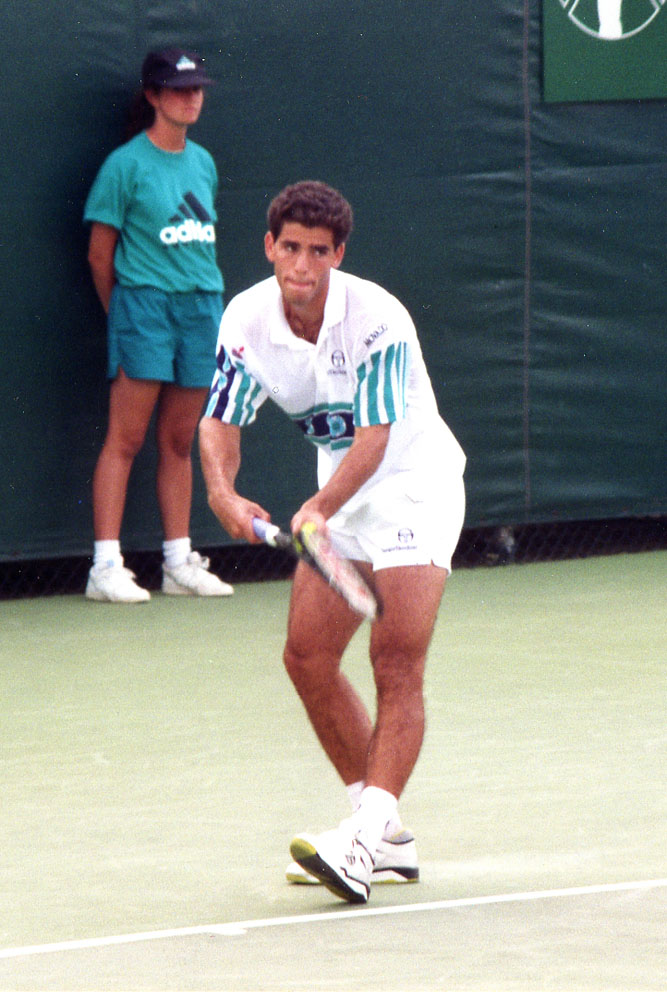
Pete Sampras captured five titles in New York City.

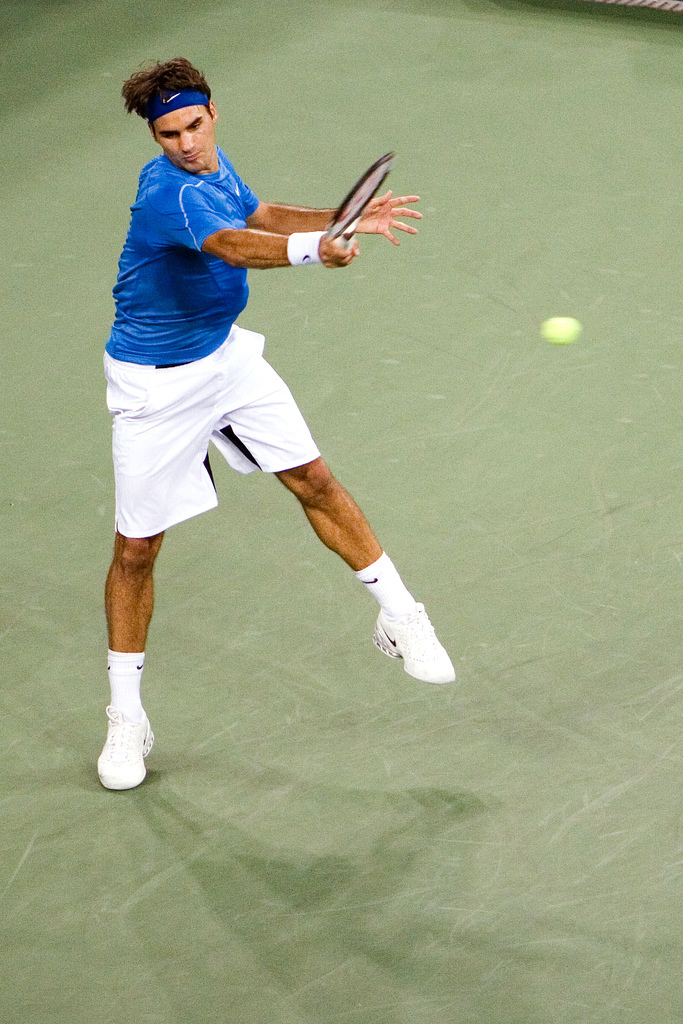
Roger Federer won an Open Era record of five consecutive titles between 2004 and 2008.

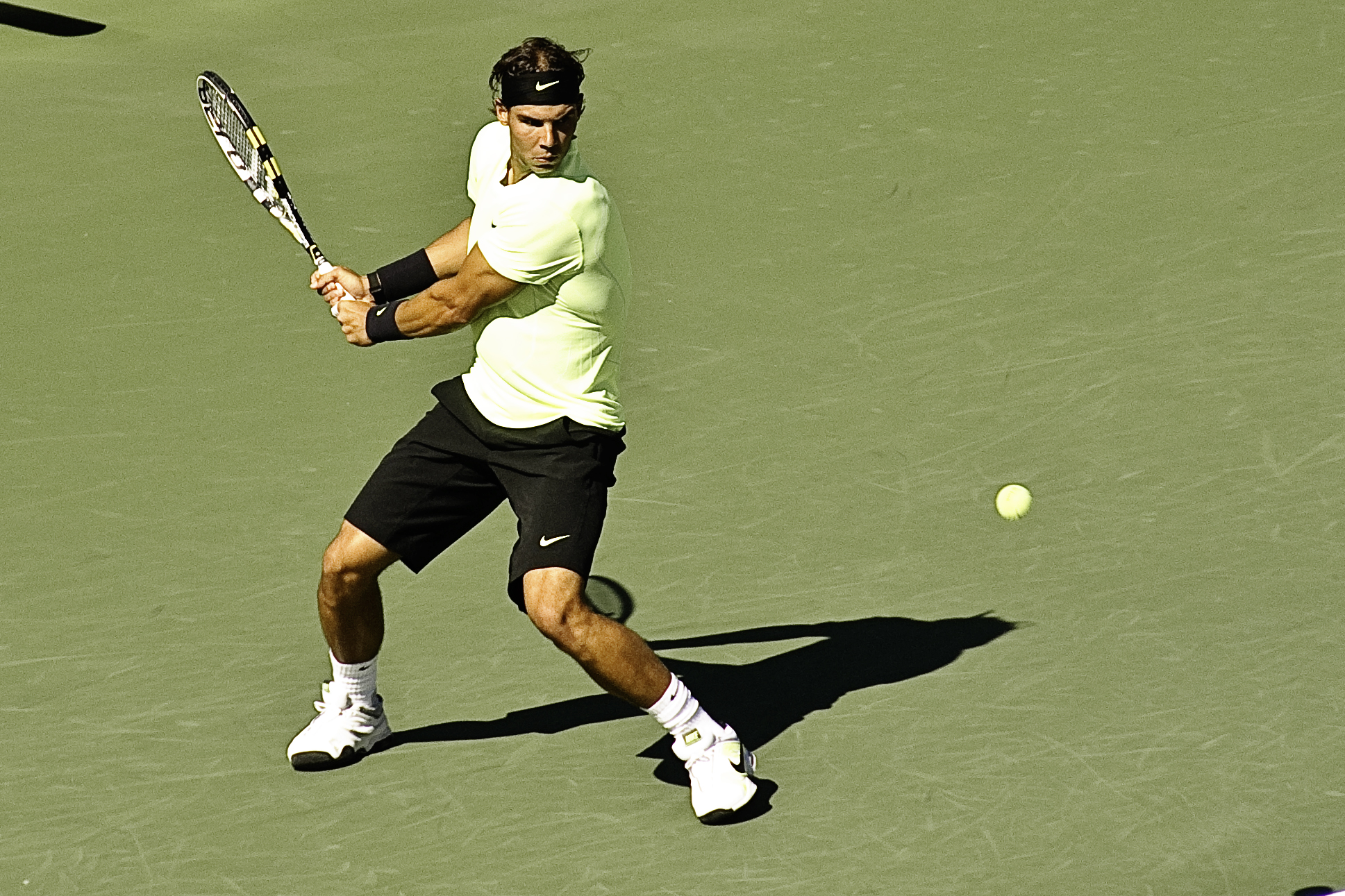
Rafael Nadal captured four titles in the 2010s decade.

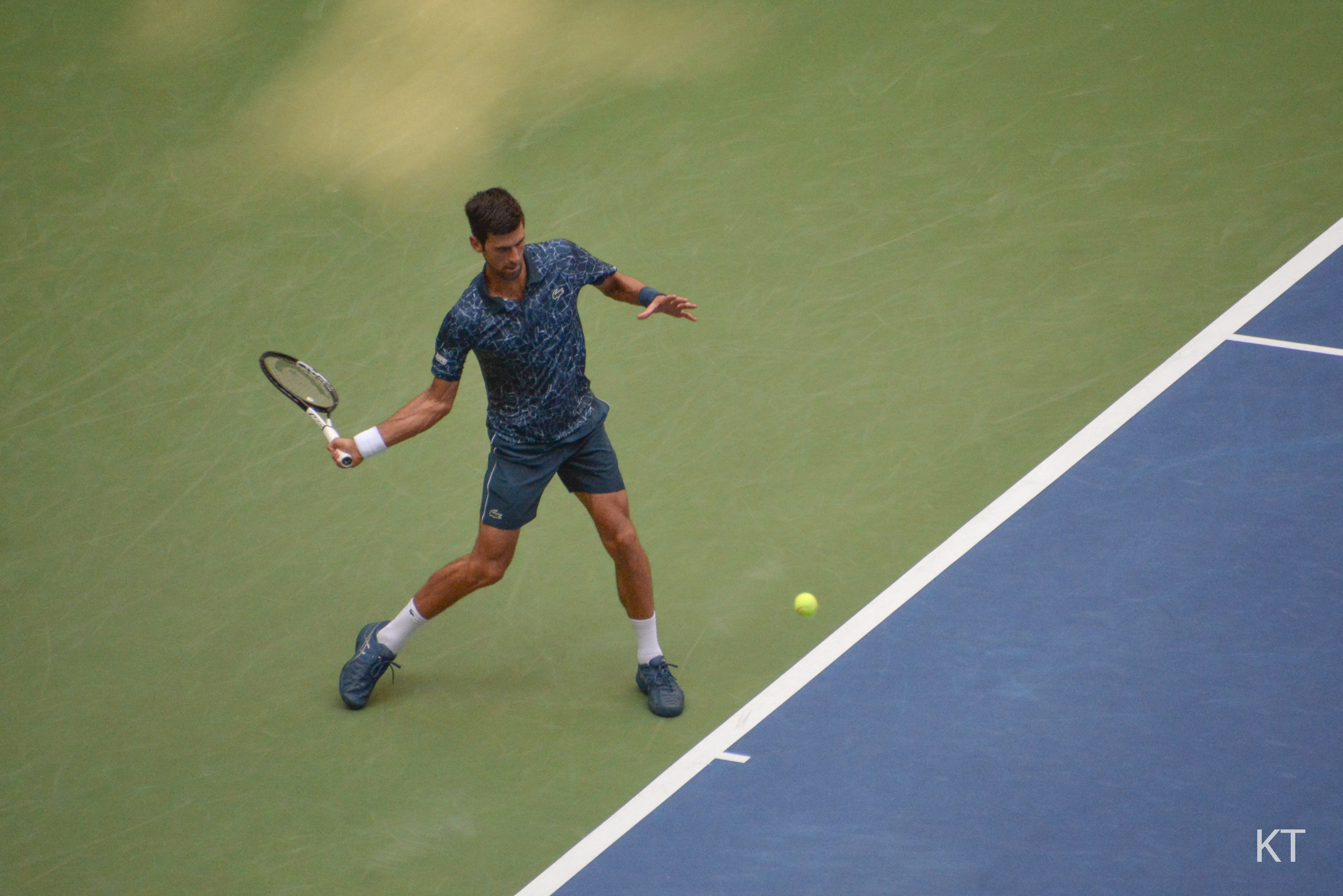
Novak Djokovic won four titles.

Year	Country	Champion	Country	Runner-up	Score in the final
1968	USA	Arthur Ashe	NED	Tom Okker	14–12, 5–7, 6–3, 3–6, 6–3
1969	AUS	Rod Laver (2/2)	AUS	Tony Roche	7–9, 6–1, 6–2, 6–2
1970	AUS	Ken Rosewall (2/2)	AUS	Tony Roche	2–6, 6–4, 7–6^{(5–2)}, 6–3 (Note: In 1970, 1971 and 1972 tiebreaks were "five point tiebreaks".)
1971	USA	Stan Smith	TCH	Jan Kodeš	3–6, 6–3, 6–2, 7–6^{(5–3)}
1972	ROU	Ilie Năstase	USA	Arthur Ashe	3–6, 6–3, 6–7^{(1–5)}, 6–4, 6–3
1973	AUS	John Newcombe (2/2)	TCH	Jan Kodeš	6–4, 1–6, 4–6, 6–2, 6–3
1974	USA	Jimmy Connors (1/5)	AUS	Ken Rosewall	6–1, 6–0, 6–1
1975	ESP	Manuel Orantes	USA	Jimmy Connors	6–4, 6–3, 6–3
1976	USA	Jimmy Connors (2/5)	SWE	Björn Borg	6–4, 3–6, 7–6^{(11–9)}, 6–4
1977	ARG	Guillermo Vilas	USA	Jimmy Connors	2–6, 6–3, 7–6^{(7–4)}, 6–0
1978	USA	Jimmy Connors (3/5)	SWE	Björn Borg	6–4, 6–2, 6–2
1979	USA	John McEnroe (1/4)	USA	Vitas Gerulaitis	7–5, 6–3, 6–3
1980	USA	John McEnroe (2/4)	SWE	Björn Borg	7–6^{(7–4)}, 6–1, 6–7^{(5–7)}, 5–7, 6–4
1981	USA	John McEnroe (3/4)	SWE	Björn Borg	4–6, 6–2, 6–4, 6–3
1982	USA	Jimmy Connors (4/5)	TCH	Ivan Lendl	6–3, 6–2, 4–6, 6–4
1983	USA	Jimmy Connors (5/5)	TCH	Ivan Lendl	6–3, 6–7^{(2–7)}, 7–5, 6–0
1984	USA	John McEnroe (4/4)	TCH	Ivan Lendl	6–3, 6–4, 6–1
1985	TCH	Ivan Lendl (1/3)	USA	John McEnroe	7–6^{(7–1)}, 6–3, 6–4
1986	TCH	Ivan Lendl (2/3)	TCH	Miloslav Mečíř	6–4, 6–2, 6–0
1987	TCH	Ivan Lendl (3/3)	SWE	Mats Wilander	6–7^{(7–9)}, 6–0, 7–6^{(7–4)}, 6–4
1988	SWE	Mats Wilander	TCH	Ivan Lendl	6–4, 4–6, 6–3, 5–7, 6–4
1989	FRG	Boris Becker	TCH	Ivan Lendl	7–6^{(7–2)}, 1–6, 6–3, 7–6^{(7–4)}
1990	USA	Pete Sampras (1/5)	USA	Andre Agassi	6–4, 6–3, 6–2
1991	SWE	Stefan Edberg (1/2)	USA	Jim Courier	6–2, 6–4, 6–0
1992	SWE	Stefan Edberg (2/2)	USA	Pete Sampras	3–6, 6–4, 7–6^{(7–5)}, 6–2
1993	USA	Pete Sampras (2/5)	FRA	Cédric Pioline	6–4, 6–4, 6–3
1994	USA	Andre Agassi (1/2)	GER	Michael Stich	6–1, 7–6^{(7–5)}, 7–5
1995	USA	Pete Sampras (3/5)	USA	Andre Agassi	6–4, 6–3, 4–6, 7–5
1996	USA	Pete Sampras (4/5)	USA	Michael Chang	6–1, 6–4, 7–6^{(7–3)}
1997	AUS	Patrick Rafter (1/2)	GBR	Greg Rusedski	6–3, 6–2, 4–6, 7–5
1998	AUS	Patrick Rafter (2/2)	AUS	Mark Philippoussis	6–3, 3–6, 6–2, 6–0
1999	USA	Andre Agassi (2/2)	USA	Todd Martin	6–4, 6–7^{(5–7)}, 6–7^{(2–7)}, 6–3, 6–2
2000	RUS	Marat Safin	USA	Pete Sampras	6–4, 6–3, 6–3
2001	AUS	Lleyton Hewitt	USA	Pete Sampras	7–6^{(7–4)}, 6–1, 6–1
2002	USA	Pete Sampras (5/5)	USA	Andre Agassi	6–3, 6–4, 5–7, 6–4
2003	USA	Andy Roddick	ESP	Juan Carlos Ferrero	6–3, 7–6^{(7–2)}, 6–3
2004	SUI	Roger Federer (1/5)	AUS	Lleyton Hewitt	6–0, 7–6^{(7–3)}, 6–0
2005	SUI	Roger Federer (2/5)	USA	Andre Agassi	6–3, 2–6, 7–6^{(7–1)}, 6–1
2006	SUI	Roger Federer (3/5)	USA	Andy Roddick	6–2, 4–6, 7–5, 6–1
2007	SUI	Roger Federer (4/5)	SRB	Novak Djokovic	7–6^{(7–4)}, 7–6^{(7–2)}, 6–4
2008	SUI	Roger Federer (5/5)	GBR	Andy Murray	6–2, 7–5, 6–2
2009	ARG	Juan Martín del Potro	SUI	Roger Federer	3–6, 7–6^{(7–5)}, 4–6, 7–6^{(7–4)}, 6–2
2010	ESP	Rafael Nadal (1/4)	SRB	Novak Djokovic	6–4, 5–7, 6–4, 6–2
2011	SRB	Novak Djokovic (1/4)	ESP	Rafael Nadal	6–2, 6–4, 6–7^{(3–7)}, 6–1
2012	GBR	Andy Murray	SRB	Novak Djokovic	7–6^{(12–10)}, 7–5, 2–6, 3–6, 6–2
2013	ESP	Rafael Nadal (2/4)	SRB	Novak Djokovic	6–2, 3–6, 6–4, 6–1
2014	CRO	Marin Čilić	JPN	Kei Nishikori	6–3, 6–3, 6–3
2015	SRB	Novak Djokovic (2/4)	SUI	Roger Federer	6–4, 5–7, 6–4, 6–4
2016	SUI	Stan Wawrinka	SRB	Novak Djokovic	6–7^{(1–7)}, 6–4, 7–5, 6–3
2017	ESP	Rafael Nadal (3/4)	RSA	Kevin Anderson	6–3, 6–3, 6–4
2018	SRB	Novak Djokovic (3/4)	ARG	Juan Martín del Potro	6–3, 7–6^{(7–4)}, 6–3
2019	ESP	Rafael Nadal (4/4)	RUS	Daniil Medvedev	7–5, 6–3, 5–7, 4–6, 6–4
2020	AUT	Dominic Thiem	GER	Alexander Zverev	2–6, 4–6, 6–4, 6–3, 7–6^{(8–6)}
2021	RUS	Daniil Medvedev	SRB	Novak Djokovic	6–4, 6–4, 6–4
2022	ESP	Carlos Alcaraz (1/2)	NOR	Casper Ruud	6–4, 2–6, 7–6^{(7–1)}, 6–3
2023	SRB	Novak Djokovic (4/4)	(Note: Competed under no flag due to the Russian invasion of Ukraine.)	Daniil Medvedev	6–3, 7–6^{(7–5)}, 6–3
2024	ITA	Jannik Sinner	USA	Taylor Fritz	6–3, 6–4, 7–5
2025	ESP	Carlos Alcaraz (2/2)	ITA	Jannik Sinner	6–2, 3–6, 6–1, 6–4
2026	GER	Alexander Zverev	USA	Ben Shelton	6–3, 7–6^{(7–2)}, 5–7, 6–2

== Statistics ==
=== Multiple champions ===
- Years in italic type denote titles defended in the challenge round.

(*) denotes event only for USNLTA club members only

Player	Amateur era	Open era	All-time	Years
Bill Tilden (USA)	7	0	7	1920, 1921, 1922, 1923, 1924, 1925, 1929
William Larned (USA)	7	0	7	1901, 1902, 1907, 1908, 1909, 1910, 1911
Richard Sears (USA)	7	0	7	1881*, 1882, 1883, 1884, 1885, 1886, 1887
Roger Federer (SUI)	0	5	5	2004, 2005, 2006, 2007, 2008
Pete Sampras (USA)	0	5	5	1990, 1993, 1995, 1996, 2002
Jimmy Connors (USA)	0	5	5	1974, 1976, 1978, 1982, 1983
Novak Djokovic (SRB)	0	4	4	2011, 2015, 2018, 2023
Rafael Nadal (ESP)	0	4	4	2010, 2013, 2017, 2019
John McEnroe (USA)	0	4	4	1979, 1980, 1981, 1984
Robert Wrenn (USA)	4	0	4	1893, 1894, 1896, 1897
Ivan Lendl (TCH)	0	3	3	1985, 1986, 1987
Fred Perry (GBR)	3	0	3	1933, 1934, 1936
Malcolm Whitman (USA)	3	0	3	1898, 1899, 1900
Oliver Campbell (USA)	3	0	3	1890, 1891, 1892
Carlos Alcaraz (ESP)	0	2	2	2022, 2025
Andre Agassi (USA)	0	2	2	1994, 1999
Patrick Rafter (AUS)	0	2	2	1997, 1998
Stefan Edberg (SWE)	0	2	2	1991, 1992
John Newcombe (AUS)	1	1	2	1967, 1973
Ken Rosewall (AUS)	1	1	2	1956, 1970
Rod Laver (AUS)	1	1	2	1962, 1969
Roy Emerson (AUS)	2	0	2	1961, 1964
Neale Fraser (AUS)	2	0	2	1959, 1960
Tony Trabert (USA)	2	0	2	1953, 1955
Frank Sedgman (AUS)	2	0	2	1951, 1952
Pancho Gonzales (USA)	2	0	2	1948, 1949
Jack Kramer (USA)	2	0	2	1946, 1947
Frank Parker (USA)	2	0	2	1944, 1945
Bobby Riggs (USA)	2	0	2	1939, 1941
Don Budge (USA)	2	0	2	1937, 1938
Ellsworth Vines (USA)	2	0	2	1931, 1932
René Lacoste (FRA)	2	0	2	1926, 1927
Bill Johnston (USA)	2	0	2	1915, 1919
Robert Lindley Murray (USA)	2	0	2	1917, 1918
R. Norris Williams (USA)	2	0	2	1914, 1916
Maurice McLoughlin (USA)	2	0	2	1912, 1913
Henry Slocum (USA)	2	0	2	1888, 1889

=== Champions by country ===
Country	Amateur Era	Open Era	All-time	First title	Last title
United States (USA)	66	19	85	1881	2003
Australia (AUS)	12	6	18	1951	2001
Spain (ESP)	1	7	8	1965	2025
Switzerland (SUI)	0	6	6	2004	2016
Great Britain (GBR)	4	1	5	1903	2012
Serbia (SRB)	0	4	4	2011	2023
Czechoslovakia (TCH) (Note: Czechoslovakia (TCH, 1918–1992), evolved into Czech Republic (CZE, 1992–present) and Slovakia (SVK, 1992–present).)	0	3	3	1985	1987
France (FRA)	3	0	3	1926	1928
Sweden (SWE)	0	3	3	1988	1992
Argentina (ARG)	0	2	2	1977	2009
Germany (GER) (Note: One win by a player from West Germany (FRG, 1949–1990).)	0	2	2	1989	2026
Russia (RUS)	0	2	2	2000	2021
Austria (AUT)	0	1	1	2020	2020
Croatia (CRO)	0	1	1	2014	2014
Italy (ITA)	0	1	1	2024	2024
Mexico (MEX)	1	0	1	1963	1963
Romania (ROU)	0	1	1	1972	1972

== See also ==
US Open other competitions

- List of US Open women's singles champions
- List of US Open men's doubles champions
- List of US Open women's doubles champions
- List of US Open mixed doubles champions

Grand Slam men's singles

- List of Australian Open men's singles champions
- List of French Open men's singles champions
- List of Wimbledon gentlemen's singles champions
- List of Grand Slam men's singles champions

Other events

- United States Amateur Tennis Championships
- U.S. Pro Tennis Championships
