= 1881 in tennis =

This page covers all the important events in the sport of tennis in 1881. It provides the results of notable tournaments throughout the year on both the men's and women's ILTF tennis circuits.

== Australian Open ==
No event.

== French Open ==
Not a Grand Slam event.

== Wimbledon ==
Category	Champion(s)	Finalist(s)	Score
Final	(United Kingdom) William Renshaw	(United Kingdom) John Hartley	6–0, 6–1, 6–1
All Comers' Final	(United Kingdom) William Renshaw	(United Kingdom) Richard Richardson	6–4, 6–2, 6–3

== US Open ==
Category	Champion(s)	Finalist(s)	Score
Singles	(United States) Richard Sears	(United Kingdom) William E. Glyn	6–0, 6–3, 6–2
Doubles	(United States) Clarence Clark (United States) Fred Taylor	(United States) Arthur Newbold (United States) Alexander Van Rensselaer	6-5, 6-4, 6-5
