= 1883 in tennis =

This page covers all the important events in the sport of tennis in 1883. It provides the results of notable tournaments throughout the year on both the men's and women's ILTF tennis circuits.

== Australian Open ==
No event.

== French Open ==
Not a Grand Slam event.

== Wimbledon ==
Category	Champion(s)	Finalist(s)	Score
Final	(United Kingdom) William Renshaw	(United Kingdom) Ernest Renshaw	2–6, 6–3, 6–3, 4–6, 6–3
All Comers' Final	(United Kingdom) Ernest Renshaw	(United Kingdom) Donald Stewart	0–6, 6–3, 6–0, 6–2

== US Open ==
Category	Champion(s)	Finalist(s)	Score
Singles	(United States) Richard D. Sears	(United States) James Dwight	6–2, 6–0, 9–7
Doubles	(United States) Richard D. Sears (United States) James Dwight	(United States) Arthur Newbold (United States) Alexander Van Rensselaer	6–0, 6–2, 6–2
