= 1882 U.S. National Championships – Doubles =

Doubles
- 1882 U.S. National Championships

Final
- Champion: (United States) Richard Sears (United States) James Dwight
- Runner-up: (United States) Crawford Nightingale (United States) George M. Smith
- Score: 6–2, 6–4

Events
| Singles | Doubles |
| ← 1881 · | U.S. National Championships | · 1883 → |

Sears and Dwight defeated Nightingale and Smith in the final of the second U.S. doubles championship.

== Draw ==
Second round
(United States) R Sears (United States) J Dwight
bye
(United States) HW Powell (United States) WV Johnson | 6 | 6
(United States) EA Thompson (United States) EE Denniston | 0 | 2
(United States) C Clark (United States) H Taylor | w/ | o
(United States) HD Betts (United States) RS Codman
(United States) WE Glyn (United States) WVS Thorne | 6 | 5 | 7
(United States) F Eldridge (United States) J Rankine | 1 | 6 | 5

Semifinals
(United States) R Sears (United States) J Dwight | 6 | 6
(United States) HW Powell (United States) WV Johnson | 5 | 1
(United States) C Clark (United States) H Taylor | 6 | 6
(United States) WE Glyn (United States) WVS Thorne | 4 | 0

Final
(United States) R Sears (United States) J Dwight | 6 | 6
(United States) C Clark (United States) H Taylor | 4 | 1
Final
(United States) A Van Rensselaer (United States) A Newbold | 3 | 2 | 6
(United States) C Nightingale (United States) GM Smith | 6 | 6
