= Edward Gray (tennis) =

American tennis player

- Full name: Edward H. Gray
- Country (sports): United States
- Turned pro: 1880 (amateur tour)
- Retired: 1882

Singles

Grand Slam singles results
- US Open: SF (1881, 1882)

Edward H. Gray was an American tennis player active in the late 19th century.

Gray reached the semifinals of the first two U.S. National Championships in 1881 and 1882. He also reached the semifinals of the 1880 Championships of America.
