= 1882 U.S. National Championships – Singles =

Singles
- 1882 U.S. National Championships

Final
- Champion: (United States) Richard Sears
- Runner-up: (United States) Clarence Clark
- Score: 6–1, 6–4, 6–0

Details
- Draw: 36

Events
Singles	Doubles
← 1881 ·	U.S. National Championships	· 1883 →

Defending champion Richard Sears defeated Clarence Clark in the final, 6–1, 6–4, 6–0 to win the men's singles tennis title at the 1882 U.S. National Championships. Except for the final, each match was played on the best of three sets. Winner of a set was the player who won six games first, no two-games advantage was required. Participation was restricted to U.S. citizens only.

== Draw ==
=== Finals ===
Quarterfinals
(United States) Richard Sears	6	6
(United States) James Rankine	0	4
(United States) Clarence Clark	w/o
(United States) James Dwight
(United States) Edward Gray
bye

Semifinals
(United States) Richard Sears
bye
(United States) Clarence Clark	6	6
(United States) Edward Gray	3	2

Finals
(United States) Richard Sears	6	6	6
(United States) Clarence Clark	1	4	0

=== Earlier rounds ===
==== Section 1 ====
First round
(United States) R Sears	6	6
(United States) L Johnson	4	1
(United Kingdom) WE Glyn	6	6
(United States) FJ Hynes	2	0
(United States) RF Conover	6	6
(United States) EK Butler	2	3
(United States) J Rankine	6	4	6
(United States) Miller	4	6	1
(United States) AB Malcolmson	1	6	6
(United States) CW Brooks	6	4	3

Second round
(United States) R Sears	6	6
(United Kingdom) WE Glyn	1	4
(United States) RF Conover	2	6	6
(United States) W.V.S. Thorne	6	0	2
(United States) J Rankine	6	6
(United States) AB Malcolmson	0	0
(United States) HW Powell	6	6
(United States) Rathbone	0	1

Third round
(United States) R Sears	6	6
(United States) RF Conover	1	4
(United States) J Rankine	6	5	6
(United States) HW Powell	4	6	5

Quarterfinals
(United States) R Sears	6	6
(United States) J Rankine	0	4

==== Section 2 ====
First round
(United States) C Clark	6	6
(United States) Boit	3	1
(United States) A Rives	6	6
(United States) T Longwood	1	0
(United States) Kneeland	6	6
(United States) XA LeRoy	2	2
(United States) J Dwight	6	6
(United States) WH Boardman	1	0
(United States) GC Allen	6	5	6
(United States) FM Carryl	4	6	2
(United States) J Clark	6	6
(United States) X.A. Baillie	3	0
(United States) X.B. Baillie	6	6
(United States) WP Metcalfe	1	0

Second round
(United States) C Clark	6	6
(United States) RS Codman	5	1
(United States) A Rives	4	6	6
(United States) Kneeland	6	1	5
(United States) J Dwight	w/o
(United States) GC Allen
(United States) J Clark	6	6
(United States) X.B. Baillie	3	0

Third round
(United States) C Clark	6	2	6
(United States) A Rives	3	6	1
(United States) J Dwight	6	6
(United States) J Clark	1	0

Quarterfinals
(United States) C Clark	w/o
(United States) J Dwight

==== Section 3 ====
First round
(United States) C Nightingale	w/o
(United States) TS Draper
(United States) F Eldridge	w/o
(United States) Roby
(United States) EH Gray	w/o
(United States) RL Agassiz
(United States) A Smith	6	6
(United States) XB LeRoy	2	2

Second round
(United States) C Nightingale	6	6
(United States) F Eldridge	4	1
(United States) EH Gray	6	6
(United States) A Smith	1	1

Third round
(United States) C Nightingale	4	4
(United States) EH Gray	6	6

Quarterfinals
(United States) EH Gray
bye

Preceded by 1882 Wimbledon Championship – Singles	Grand Slam men's singles	Succeeded by 1883 Wimbledon Championship – Singles
