= 1881 U.S. National Championships – Singles =

Singles
- 1881 U.S. National Championships

Final
- Champion: (United States) Richard Sears
- Runner-up: (United Kingdom) William Glyn
- Score: 6–0, 6–3, 6–2

Details
- Draw: 25

Events
Singles	Doubles
U.S. National Championships	· 1882 →

Richard Sears defeated William Glyn in the final 6–0 6–3 6–2 to win the inaugural men's singles tennis title at the 1881 U.S. National Championships. Each match was the best of three sets, except for the final which was best of five. Winner of a set was the player who won six games first; no two-game advantage was required. Participation was restricted to USNLTA club members.

== Draw ==
=== Key ===
- Q = Qualifier
- WC = Wild card
- LL = Lucky loser
- Alt = Alternate
- SE = Special exempt
- PR = Protected ranking
- ITF = ITF entry
- JE = Junior exempt
- w/o = Walkover
- r = Retired
- d = Defaulted
- SR = Special ranking

=== Finals ===
Quarterfinals
(United States) Richard Sears	6	6
(United States) Crawford Nightingale	3	5
(United States) Edward Gray
bye
(United Kingdom) William Glyn	6	4	6
(United States) William Gammell	4	6	4
(United States) Samuel Shaw	4	6	6
(United States) Kessler	6	3	1

Semifinals
(United States) Richard Sears	6	6
(United States) Edward Gray	3	0
(United Kingdom) William Glyn	6	6
(United States) Samuel Shaw	2	2

Finals
(United States) Richard Sears	6	6	6
(United Kingdom) William Glyn	0	3	2

=== Top half ===
First round
(United States) RD Sears	6	6
(United States) HW Powell	0	2
(United States) Anderson	6	6
(United States) Randolph	2	0
(United States) CA Nightingale	6	6
(United States) Caldwell	2	0
(United States) WH Barnes	6	1	6
(United States) Miller	2	6	1
(United States) EH Gray	6	6
(United States) FJ Hines	5	3
(United States) Coggswell	6	6
(United States) Congdon	4	5

Second round
(United States) RD Sears	6	6
(United States) Anderson	1	2
(United States) CA Nightingale	6	6
(United States) WH Barnes	4	3
(United States) EH Gray	6	6
(United States) Coggswell	0	0

Quarterfinals
(United States) RD Sears	6	6
(United States) CA Nightingale	3	5
(United States) EH Gray
bye

Semifinals
(United States) RD Sears	6	6
(United States) EH Gray	3	0

=== Bottom half ===
First round
(United Kingdom) WE Glyn	1	6	6
(United States) AL Rives	6	1	1
(United States) RF Conover	6	6
(United States) EL Morse	1	1
(United States) W Gammell	1	6	6
(United States) AE Newbold	6	3	1
(United States) Rathbone	6	5	6
(United States) FN Saunders	5	6	5
(United States) Kessler	6	6
(United States) F Eldridge	1	4
(United States) WW Smith
(United States) Pruyn	w/o

Second round
(United Kingdom) WE Glyn	6	6
(United States) RF Conover	5	2
(United States) W Gammell
bye
(United States) S Shaw	6	6
(United States) Rathbone	3	5
(United States) Kessler	6	6
(United States) WW Smith	1	2

Quarterfinals
(United Kingdom) WE Glyn	6	4	6
(United States) W Gammell	4	6	4
(United States) S Shaw	4	6	6
(United States) Kessler	6	3	1

Semifinals
(United Kingdom) WE Glyn	6	6
(United States) S Shaw	2	2

Preceded by 1881 Wimbledon Championship – Singles	Grand Slam men's singles	Succeeded by 1882 Wimbledon Championship – Singles
