= 1883 U.S. National Championships – Doubles =

Doubles
- 1883 U.S. National Championships

Final
- Champion: (United States) James Dwight (United States) Richard Sears
- Runner-up: (United States) Arthur Newbold (United States) Alexander Van Rensselaer
- Score: 6–0, 6–2, 6–2

Events
Singles	Doubles
← 1882 ·	U.S. National Championships	· 1884 →

Dwight and Sears won the title by defeating Newbold and Van Rensselaer in the final.

== Draw ==
Second round
(United States) J Dwight (United States) R Sears	6	6
(United States) CH Farnum (United States) WB Dixon	5	0
(United States) Keene (United States) J Tooker	6	5	6
(United States) MS Paton (United States) Munn	4	6	0
–
–
–
–

Semifinals
(United States) J Dwight (United States) R Sears	6	6
(United States) Keene (United States) J Tooker	2	1
–
–

Final
(United States) J Dwight (United States) R Sears
bye
Final
(United States) S Shaw (United States) Leeds	6	5	6
(United States) A Newbold (United States) A Van Rensselaer	3	6	6
