= 1882 Wimbledon Championship =

- Date: 8 – 17 July
- Edition: 6th
- Category: Grand Slam
- Surface: Grass
- Location: Worple Road; SW19, Wimbledon, London, United Kingdom
- Venue: All England Lawn Tennis Club

Champions

Singles
- (United Kingdom) William Renshaw
- Wimbledon Championship

The 1882 Wimbledon Championships took place on the outdoor grass courts at the All England Lawn Tennis Club in Wimbledon, London, United Kingdom. The tournament ran from 8 July until 17 July. It was the 6th staging of the Wimbledon Championships, and the first Grand Slam tennis event of 1882. The net was brought down to its present height of 3 feet 6 inches (1.07 m) at the posts, and 3 feet (0.91 m) in the middle.

Ernest Renshaw won the all comers' final against R. T. Richardson, 7–5, 6–3, 2–6, 6–3 and later lost against his twin brother and defending champion William Renshaw in the final, 6–1, 2–6, 4–6, 6–2, 6–2. The London Standard in a match report stated "...the brothers Renshaw gave perhaps the finest exposition of the game of lawn tennis ever seen at Wimbledon." The challenge round was watched by 2000 spectators.

== Singles ==
=== Final ===
(United Kingdom) William Renshaw defeated (United Kingdom) Ernest Renshaw, 6–1, 2–6, 4–6, 6–2, 6–2

=== All Comers' Final ===
(United Kingdom) Ernest Renshaw defeated (United Kingdom) Richard Richardson, 7–5, 6–3, 2–6, 6–3

Preceded by 1881 U.S. National Championships	Grand Slams	Succeeded by 1882 U.S. National Championships
