= Foxhall P. Keene =

American thoroughbred race horse owner (1867–1941)

Foxhall Parker Keene
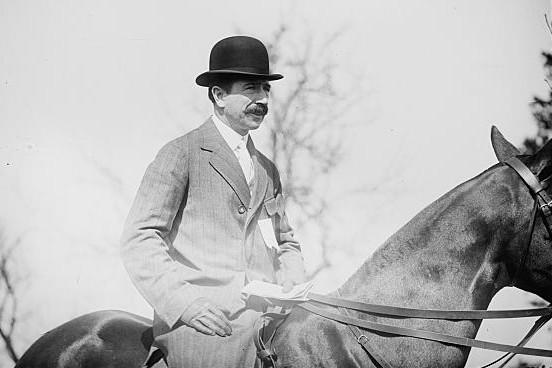
- Keene in 1909
- Country (sports): United States
- Born: December 18, 1867 San Francisco, California, U.S.
- Died: September 25, 1941 (aged 73) Ayer's Cliff, Quebec, Canada

Singles

Grand Slam singles results
- US Open: SF (1883)

Doubles

Grand Slam doubles results
- US Open: QF (1883, 1884)

Medal record

Men's polo

Representing a Mixed team

Olympic Games
Gold medal – first place	1900 Paris	Team competition

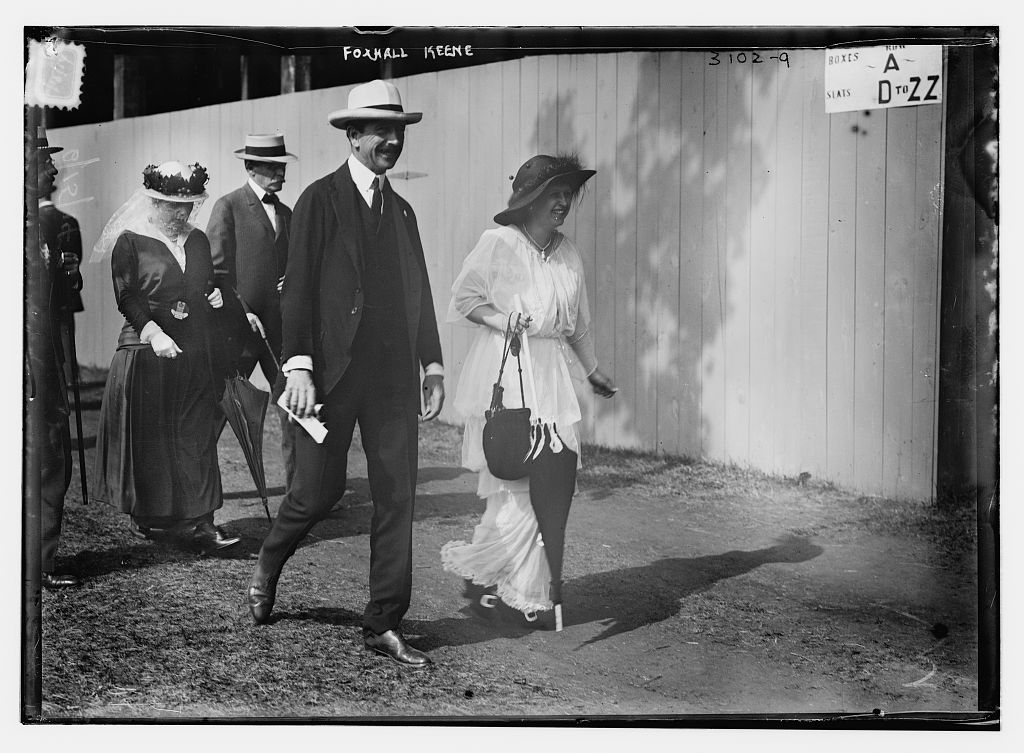
Keene on June 13, 1914, at the Meadowbrook Polo Club for the International Polo Cup

Foxhall Parker Keene (December 18, 1867 – September 25, 1941) was an American thoroughbred race horse owner and breeder, a world and Olympic gold medallist in polo, and an amateur tennis player. He was rated the best all-around polo player in the United States for eight consecutive years, a golfer who competed in the U.S. Open, and a pioneer racecar driver who vied for the Gordon Bennett Cup. In addition to his substantial involvement in flat racing, he was also a founding member of the National Steeplechase Association.

== Biography ==
He was born in San Francisco, California, on December 18, 1867, to Sarah Jay Daingerfield and James Robert Keene. At the time of his birth, his father was president of the San Francisco Stock Exchange. James R. Keene was also a major owner/breeder of thoroughbred racehorses and a founder of The Jockey Club from whom Foxhall Keene inherited Castleton Farm, an important breeding operation near Lexington, Kentucky.

Keene was an avid golfer who competed in the 1897 U.S. Open and who made it to the quarterfinals in the 1898 U.S. Amateur. Although he played at a high level in a number of sports, he excelled at the game of polo. A 10-goal player, he was a member of the Rockaway Hunting Club in Lawrence, Nassau County, New York, today the oldest country club in the United States. With team captain Tommy Hitchcock, in 1886 he was part of the first U.S. international polo team that competed in the inaugural International Polo Cup matches against England. He was rated the best all-around polo player in the United States for eight consecutive years and won the gold medal in Polo at the 1900 Summer Olympics. Following its formation, he was inducted posthumously into the Museum of Polo and Hall of Fame in 1992.

Keene also competed as a top-level tennis player, reaching the semifinals of the 1883 U.S. National Championships and the quarterfinals in 1885.

With the advent of automobile racing, Keene competed in the 1903 Gordon Bennett Cup at Athy, County Kildare, Ireland driving a Mercedes. In a race won by Camille Jenatzy, he did not finish after his car experienced axle problems.

Keene maintained a country home at Monkton, Maryland, and a home in England with a stable at Melton Mowbray where he kept up to ten field hunters for fox hunting. In addition, he had a seasonal residence at Ayer's Cliff, Quebec, on Lake Massawippi.

In strained financial circumstances later in life, he retired to Quebec to be close to his sister. In 1938, he published a memoir, 'Full Tilt. The Sporting Memoirs Of Foxhall Keene", in collaboration with his friend writer Alden R. Hatch. He died on September 25, 1941, at Ayer's Cliff, Quebec.
