= 1883 U.S. National Championships (tennis) =

- Date: August 21–24
- Edition: 3rd
- Surface: Grass
- Location: Newport, Rhode Island, United States
- Venue: Newport Casino

Champions

Singles
- (United States) Richard D. Sears

Doubles
- (United States) Richard D. Sears / (United States) James Dwight
- U.S. National Championships

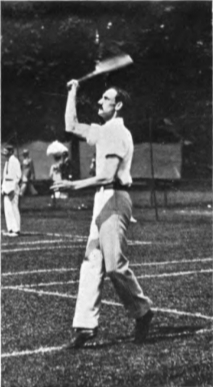
Richard D. Sears won the singles tournament.

The 1883 U.S. National Championships (now known as the US Open) was a tennis tournament that took place on the outdoor grass courts at the Newport Casino in Newport, Rhode Island. The tournament ran from August 21 until August 24. It was the 3rd staging of the U.S. National Championships, and the second Grand Slam tennis event of the year.

== Finals ==
=== Singles ===
(United States) Richard D. Sears defeated (United States) James Dwight 6–2, 6–0, 9–7

=== Doubles ===
(United States) Richard D. Sears / (United States) James Dwight def. (United States) Arthur Newbold / (United States) Alexander Van Rensselaer 6–0, 6–2, 6–2

Preceded by 1883 Wimbledon Championships	Grand Slams	Succeeded by 1884 Wimbledon Championships
