= 1881 U.S. National Championships – Doubles =

Doubles
- 1881 U.S. National Championships

Final
- Champion: (United States) Clarence Clark (United States) Frederick Winslow Taylor
- Runner-up: (United States) Arthur Newbold (United States) Alexander Van Rensselaer
- Score: 6–5, 6–4, 6–5

Events
| Singles | Doubles |
| U.S. National Championships | · 1882 → |

The doubles champions of the first U.S. championships were Clarence Clark and Frederick Winslow Taylor.

== Draw ==
The draw is for the most part unknown. It seems to have consisted of four rounds. In the first round, Clark and Taylor defeated Smith and Crawford Nightingale. In a second match, Alexander Van Rensselaer and Arthur Newbold (né Arthur Emlen Newbold; 1859–1920) beat Arthur Rives and Stevens 6–5 and 6–2. Like in the singles competition, except for the final, each match was played on the best of three sets.

| Final |
| (United States) Clarence Clark (United States) Frederick Winslow Taylor | 6 | 6 | 6 |
| (United States) Arthur Newbold (United States) Alexander Van Rensselaer | 5 | 4 | 5 |
