= 1881 U.S. National Championships (tennis) =

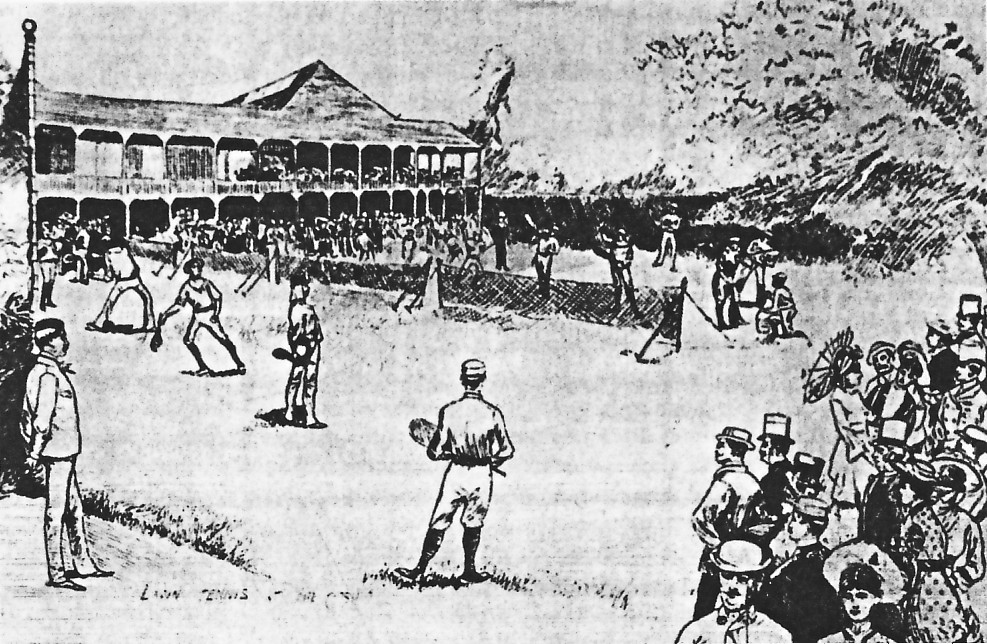
- Date: August 31 – September 3
- Edition: 1st
- Surface: Grass
- Location: Newport, Rhode Island, United States
- Venue: Newport Casino

Champions

Singles
- (United States) Richard D. Sears

Doubles
- (United States) Clarence Clark / (United States) Fred Taylor
- U.S. National Championships

The inaugural U.S. National Championship (now known as the US Open) was a tennis tournament that took place in August 1881 at the Newport Casino, Newport, Rhode Island. For the first and only time, only clubs that were members of the United States National Lawn Tennis Association were permitted to enter the tournament. A Men's Singles competition and a Men's Doubles competition were played, and Richard Sears became the first men's singles U.S. National Tennis Champion.

== Finals ==
=== Singles ===
(United States) Richard Sears defeated (United Kingdom) William E. Glyn 6–0, 6–3, 6–2

=== Doubles ===
(United States) Clarence Clark / (United States) Fred Taylor defeated (United States) Arthur Newbold / (United States) Alexander Van Rensselaer, 6-5, 6-4, 6-5

Preceded by 1881 Wimbledon Championships	Grand Slams	Succeeded by 1882 Wimbledon Championships
