= 1882 U.S. National Championships (tennis) =

- Date: August 30 – September 2
- Edition: 2nd
- Surface: Grass
- Location: Newport, Rhode Island, United States
- Venue: Newport Casino

Champions

Singles
- (United States) Richard D. Sears

Doubles
- (United States) Richard D. Sears / (United States) James Dwight
- U.S. National Championships

The 1882 U.S. National Championships (now known as the US Open) was a tennis tournament that took place on the outdoor grass courts at the Newport Casino in Newport, Rhode Island. The tournament ran from August 30 until September 2. It was the 2nd staging of the U.S. National Championships, and the second Grand Slam tennis event of the year. Thirty players entered the singles competition and fifteen teams took part in the doubles championship.

== Finals ==
=== Singles ===
(United States) Richard Sears defeated (United States) Clarence M. Clark 6–1, 6–4, 6–0

=== Doubles ===
(United States) Richard Sears / (United States) James Dwight def. (United States) Crawford Nightingale / (United States) George Smith 6–2, 6–4, 6–4

Preceded by 1882 Wimbledon Championships	Grand Slams	Succeeded by 1883 Wimbledon Championships
