= 1883 U.S. National Championships – Singles =

Singles
- 1883 U.S. National Championships

Final
- Champion: (United States) Richard Sears
- Runner-up: (United States) James Dwight
- Score: 6–2, 6–0, 9–7

Details
- Draw: 27

Events
Singles	Doubles
← 1882 ·	U.S. National Championships	· 1884 →

Two-time defending champion Richard Sears defeated James Dwight in the final 6–2, 6–0, 9–7 to win the men's singles tennis title at the 1883 U.S. National Championships. Except for the final, each match was played on the best of three sets. Winner of a set was the player who won six games first, no two-games advantage was required. Participation was restricted to players who competed for U.S. clubs.

== Draw ==
=== Finals ===
Semifinals
(United States) Richard Sears	6	6
(United States) Foxhall Keene	0	0
(United States) James Dwight	6	6
(United States) Richard F Conover	4	3

Final
(United States) Richard Sears	6	6	9
(United States) James Dwight	2	0	7

=== Earlier rounds ===
==== Section 1 ====
First round
(United States) C Farnum	6	4	6
(United States) HA Taylor	2	6	4
(United States) HW Powell	6	6
(United States) Wharton	2	0
(United States) WH Bucknall	6	6
(United States) W Gammell	5	5
(United States) F Keene	6	6
(United States) Johnson	4	1
(United States) MG Post	6	6
(United States) JH Powell	4	4
(United States) GM Smith	w/	o
(United States) Williams
(United States) F Eldridge	6	3	6
(United States) FJ Hynes	5	6	4

Second round
(United States) C Farnum	1	4
(United States) R Sears	6	6
(United States) HW Powell	6	6
(United States) WH Bucknall	1	5
(United States) F Keene	6	6
(United States) MG Post	2	4
(United States) GM Smith	6	6
(United States) F Eldridge	5	1

Quarterfinals
(United States) R Sears	6	6
(United States) HW Powell	2	0
(United States) F Keene	6	6
(United States) GM Smith	3	4

Semifinals
(United States) R Sears	6	6
(United States) F Keene	0	0

==== Section 2 ====
First round
(United States) MS Paton	6	6
(United States) WP Metcalfe	5	4
(United States) J Dwight	6	6
(United States) M Thomas	0	2
(United States) GM Brinley	6	6
(United States) SH Hooper	5	1
(United States) AE Newbold	w/	o
(United States) GW Beals
(United States) RF Conover	5	6	6
(United States) JS Tooker	6	1	1
(United States) WB Dixon	4	6	6
(United States) L Bosnal	6	3	1

Second round
(United States) MS Paton	3	0
(United States) J Dwight	6	6
(United States) GM Brinley	6	5	6
(United States) AE Newbold	4	6	3
(United States) RF Conover	6	6
(United States) WB Dixon	2	2

Quarterfinals
(United States) J Dwight	6	6
(United States) GM Brinley	2	3
(United States) RF Conover
bye

Semifinals
(United States) J Dwight	6	6
(United States) RF Conover	4	3

Preceded by 1882 U.S. National Championships – Singles	Grand Slam men's singles	Succeeded by 1884 U.S. National Championships – Singles
