= William Glyn =

United States–based British tennis player (1859–1939)

- Full name: William Edward Glyn
- Country (sports): United Kingdom
- Born: 1859; Wycliffe, County Durham, England
- Died: 23 March 1939 (aged 80); New York City, United States
- Turned pro: 1881 (amateur tour)
- Retired: 1887

Singles

Grand Slam singles results
- US Open: F (1881)

Doubles

Grand Slam doubles results
- US Open: QF (1882)

William Edward Glyn (1859 – March 23, 1939) was a United States–based British male tennis player.

William Glyn from the Staten Island Cricket and B.B. Club was a finalist in the first U.S. National Championships held in 1881 at the Newport Lawn Tennis Club in Newport, Rhode Island. En route to the final, he defeated Mr. Rives, Richard Field Conover, W. Gammell Jr., and T. A. Shaw. In the final he met and was defeated by Richard D. Sears.

== Grand Slam finals ==
=== Singles (1 runner-up) ===
Result	Year	Championship	Surface	Opponent	Score
Loss	1881	U.S. Championships	Grass	(United States) Richard D. Sears	0–6, 3–6, 2–6

== Sources ==
Shannon, Bill (1981). Official Encyclopedia of Tennis. Harper & Row. p. 19.
