= Richard Field Conover =

American tennis player, lawyer, and real estate manager

- Country (sports): United States
- Born: November 20, 1858; South Amboy, New Jersey
- Died: June 5, 1930 (aged 71); Charleston, South Carolina

Singles

Grand Slam singles results
- US Open: SF (1883)

Doubles

Grand Slam doubles results
- US Open: QF (1882, 1883, 1884)

Richard Field Conover (November 20, 1858 – June 5, 1930) was an American tennis player, lawyer and real estate manager.

== Life ==
Conover was born in South Amboy, New Jersey, the son of Francis Stevens Conover and Helen Stockton Field. He was a grandson of Richard Stockton, a signer of the Declaration of Independence.

As a tennis player, Conover took part in the first stagings of the US Championships in between 1881 and 1884. In 1883 he reached the semifinals which he lost to James Dwight.

After graduating from Princeton University and Columbia Law School, he practiced law at Newark for a short while before moving to Texas where he engaged in ranching. Conover there met his wife, Cornelia Fitzhugh, whom he married on September 11, 1895. They had three children: Carroll Fitzhugh Conover (b. circa June 1896), Helen Field Conover (b. 21 March 1898) and Alida Van Rensselaer Conover (b. 6 February 1900).

In 1900, Conover moved to Bay City, Michigan, where he concentrated on managing his wife's real estates in Bay County.

In the 1920s, he lived at New Port Richey, Florida. He died on June 5, 1930, at Charleston, South Carolina, at age 71.
