= Clarence Clark (tennis) =

American tennis player and banker (1859-1937)

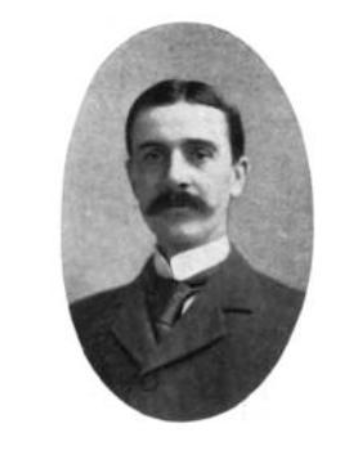
- Full name: Clarence Munroe Clark
- Country (sports): United States
- Born: August 27, 1859 Philadelphia, Pennsylvania, U.S.
- Died: June 29, 1937 (aged 77) Philadelphia, Pennsylvania, U.S.
- Turned pro: 1881 (amateur tour)
- Retired: 1885
- College: University of Pennsylvania
- Int. Tennis HoF: 1983 (member page)

Singles

Grand Slam singles results
- US Open: F (1882)

Doubles

Grand Slam doubles results
- US Open: W (1881)

Clarence Munroe Clark (August 27, 1859 – June 29, 1937) was an American tennis player and financier.

Clark won the 1881 U.S. National Championship - Doubles with Frederick Winslow Taylor and was a finalist in the 1882 U.S. National Championships - Singles. He helped to establish the United States Lawn Tennis Association in 1881 and served as the first secretary. He and his brother Joseph Sill Clark Sr. were the first Americans to play doubles on Centre Court at Wimbledon.

He was a partner in the banking firm E. W. Clark & Co. He invested in and managed electric light, power, and railway companies.

In 1983, he was inducted into the International Tennis Hall of Fame.

== Early life and education ==
Clark was born on August 27, 1859, in the Germantown neighborhood of Philadelphia, to Edward White Clark and Mary Todhunter Sill Clark. He was a member of the Young America Cricket Club with his brother Joseph Sill Clark Sr. and Frederick Winslow Taylor where they all became interested in tennis. In 1878, the Clark brothers built a tennis court on their father's property and Frederick Winslow Taylor built a court on his family's property where they all played tennis together frequently. He attended Germantown Academy and graduated from the University of Pennsylvania in 1878.

== Tennis career ==
In 1879, at age 20, he created the All-Philadelphia Lawn Tennis Committee to codify rules and regulations for local competitions and organized matches against other organizations. In 1881, he helped organize a meeting of 33 tennis clubs to develop consistent regulations for the sport. From this meeting, the United States Lawn Tennis Association was formed; Clark served as the first secretary.

That same year, he won the first doubles tournament in the U.S. National Championships (later called the U.S. Open), playing with Frederick Winslow Taylor, after defeating first the favored Richard Sears/James Dwight, and in the final round, Alexander Van Rensselaer/Arthur Newbold. In 1882, he reached the final of the championships, where he lost to reigning champion Sears in straight sets. Clark also reached the semifinals in 1884.

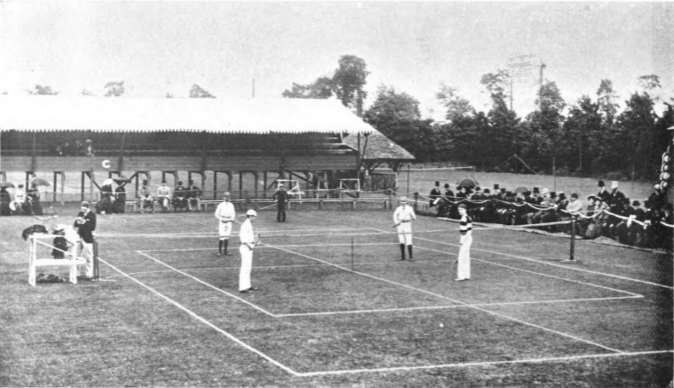
In 1883, Clarence and his brother Joseph became the first Americans to play at Centre Court of Wimbledon.

In 1883, Clark and his brother Joseph competed in doubles at Wimbledon against Ernest Renshaw and William Renshaw. The Clark brothers were the first Americans to play at Centre Court.

He was inducted into the International Tennis Hall of Fame in 1983.

== Business career ==
Clark worked in a chemical lab and in the forging department at the Midvale Steel company. In 1883, he took a six-month leave of absence and traveled throughout Europe to learn from European steel companies. After his return, he led the ordnance and railroad- and automobile-wheel production. He was promoted to second assistant superintendent and to assistant superintendent in 1886. He left Midvale Steel in 1887 and took a position as treasurer and secretary of the Flat Top Coal Land Association, which owned most of the land for mining of the Pocahontas Coalfield.

In 1900, he became a partner in E. W. Clark & Co., a bank founded by his grandfather Enoch White Clark. He was placed in charge of public utility investments. He invested in electric light, electric power, and electric street railway companies. He served as president of the Nashville Railway and Light Company, the Northern Ohio Power Company, the Tennessee Electric Power Company, the Portland Electric Power Company, as well as a director of several other companies.

Clark endowed a professorship in Mountain Agriculture at Berea College.

He died on June 29, 1937, at the age of 77, at his home, Cedron, in Germantown, Philadelphia. He was interred at West Laurel Hill Cemetery in Bala Cynwyd, Pennsylvania.

== Personal life ==
He married Mary Newbold Taylor in 1884 and together they had three sons.

== Grand Slam finals ==
=== Doubles (winner) ===
Result	Year	Championship	Surface	Opponent	Score
Win	1881	1881 U.S. National Championships – Doubles	Grass	(United States) Arthur Newbold/Alexander Van Rensselaer	6–5, 6–4, 6–5

=== Singles (1 runner-up) ===
Result	Year	Championship	Surface	Opponent	Score
Loss	1882	1882 U.S. National Championships – Singles	Grass	(United States) Richard D. Sears	1–6, 4–6, 0–6
