= New Hampshire State Championships =

Defunct tennis tournament
- Tour: USNLTA Circuit (1895–1923) ILTF Circuit (1924-59)
- Founded: 1895; 130 years ago
- Abolished: 1970; 55 years ago
- Location: Center Harbor; Crawford Notch; Concord
- Venue: Center Harbor LTC; Crawford House; Concord LTC

The New Hampshire State Championships, also called the New Hampshire Championships, was a men's and women's tennis tournament founded in 1895 as a sanctioned event of the United States National Lawn Tennis Association. It was first held at the Center Harbor LTC, Center Harbor, New Hampshire, United States. The tournament was held in conjunction with the White Mountains Tennis Championships from 1905 to 1950. It ran annually as part of the USNLTA Circuit from 1895 to 1923, then as part of ILTF Circuit from 1924 to 1970, when it was dropped from that circuit.

== History ==
In 1890 the first edition of the East Side of the White Mountains Championships was held. That tournament was a United States National Lawn Tennis Association sanctioned event. The tournament was organized by the Iron Mountain Lawn Tennis Association and held at the Iron Mountain LTC, Jackson, New Hampshire. This event ran until 1895 then was discontinued. In 1905 the tournament was revived at Crawford Notch, New Hampshire as the White Mountains Championships. It was located approximately 20 miles (32 km) from Jackson, and played on outside tennis courts at the Crawford House, where the men's tournament was held in conjunction with the New Hampshire State Championships. The women's tournament continued to be held in Jackson, New Hampshire, until 1916 under its original name the East Side of the White Mountains Championships.

In 1924 the women's tournament was added to the schedule of the New Hampshire State Championships as a combined tournament known as the New Hampshire and White Mountains Championships, with players assuming both titles e.g. New Hampshire State Champion and White Mountains Champion. The joint tournament was held in Crawford Notch until the beginning of the Second World War. Following the war it was still being held in Crawford. By 1950 the New Hampshire State Championships and White Mountains separated into two events; the former continued to be played at Crawford Notch, while the latter moved to Waumbec Tennis Club at Jefferson, New Hampshire. In 1964 the tournament moved to Concord, New Hampshire. With the onset of the open era looming, this tennis tournament was discontinued in 1970.

== Finals ==
=== Men's singles ===
(incomplete roll)

Year	Location	Champion	Runner Up	Score
New Hampshire State Championships
↓ USNLTA Circuit ↓
1895	Center Harbor	(United States) Jahial Parmly Paret	(United States) Henry G. Bixby	7-5, 6–3, 6–2.
1897	Center Harbor	(United States) James S. Terry	(United States) Beals Wright	?
New Hampshire State and White Mountains Championships
1910	Crawford Notch	(United States) Fred H. Harris	(United States) William Bradshaw Craigin	4-6, 6–4, 6–3, 6–2.
1911	Crawford Notch	(United States) Fred H. Harris (2)	(United States) William Bradshaw Craigin	7–5, 6–1, 6–2.
1912	Crawford Notch	(United States) Fred H. Harris (3)	(United States) ?	?.
1913	Crawford Notch	(United States) James Newell	(United States) G. A. Pratt	6–4, 4–6, 7–5, 6–2.
↓ ILTF Circuit ↓
1930	Crawford Notch	(United States) Percy Lloyd Kynaston	(United States) Anton Frederick Von Bernuth	6–0, 9–7, 6–0.
1935	Crawford Notch	(United States) Arthur B. Wright	(United States) David Burt	6–2, 6–0, 6–2.
1937	Crawford Notch	(United States) Robert Decker	(United States) Anton Frederick Von Bernuth	3–6, 4–6, 6–3, 6–2, 6–1.
1938	Crawford Notch	(United States) Sandy Davenport	(United States) Donald Meiklejohn	7–5, 6–1, 6–2.
1939	Crawford Notch	(United States) Sandy Davenport (2)	(United States) Fred (Fritz) Kuser	6–4, 5–7, 6–2, 6–4.
New Hampshire State Championships
1955	Jefferson	(United States) Larry Lewis	(United States) Donald S. Hawley	6–3, 6–4, 8–6.
1956	Crawford Notch	(United States) Chauncey Steele Jr.	(United States) E. Blair Hawley	6–2, 6–4.
1957	Crawford Notch	(United States) Ronald Holmberg	(United States) Chauncey Steele Jr.	6–2, 6–1, 6–1.
1958	Crawford Notch	(United States) Ronald Holmberg (2)	(United States) Ralph Stuart	6–3, 3-1 rte.
1959	Crawford Notch	(United States) Ronald Holmberg (3)	(United States) Paul Sullivan	6–1, 6–1, 6–2.
1960	Crawford Notch	(United States) Ronald Holmberg (4)	(United States) Father Hume	?.
1963	Concord	(United States) Ned Weld	(United States) Ralph Stuart	7–5, 7–5.
1964	Concord	(United States) Tony Lieberman	(United States) Bill Cullen	9–7, 6–3, 6–1.
1965	Concord	(United States) Ned Weld (2)	(United States) Tom Raleigh	6–3, 6–3, 6–2.
1966	Concord	(United States) Larry Lewis	(United States) Paul Young	6–2, 6–3.
1967	Concord	(United States) Larry Lewis (2)	(United States) Dick Hoehn	6–4, 2–6, 6–3.
1968	Concord	(United States) Henri Salaun	(United States) Roger Wilson Magenau	6–4, 6–1.
↓ Open era ↓
New Hampshire State Open Championships
1969	Concord	(United States) Ned Weld	(Switzerland) Lucien Sulloway	6–2, 6–3.
1970	Concord	(United States) Paul Sullivan	(United States) Ted Hoehn	12–10, 11–9.

=== Women's singles ===
(incomplete roll)

Year	Location	Champion	Runner Up	Score
New Hampshire State and White Mountains Championships
↓ ILTF Circuit ↓
1924	Crawford Notch	(United States) Alice Jenckes	(United States) Mrs G. Walker	6–4, 6–3
1925	Crawford Notch	(United States) Gladys Taylor Hawk	(United States) Penelope Davies	6-3, 6–4
1926	Crawford Notch	(United States) Elsie Lang Pritchard	(United States) Mrs J. Bailey	6-2, 6–4
1928	Crawford Notch	(United States) Mrs J. Bailey	(United States) Christina Alvarez Stanwix	6-3, 3–6, 8–6
1929	Crawford Notch	(United States) Rosamond Newton	(United States) Anne Hollis	6–0, 6–1
1930	Crawford Notch	(United States) Gladys Taylor Hawk (2)	(United States) Margaret Cluett	6–0, 6–2
1933	Crawford Notch	(United States) Ottilie Gaertner	(United States) Mariette Arguimbau	6-2 6–1
1934	Crawford Notch	(United States) Eunice Dean	(United States) Lydia Kayser	6–3, 6–4
1935	Crawford Notch	(United States) Mary Whittemore	(United States) Ottilie Gaertner	6–3, 6–1
1936	Crawford Notch	(United States) Esther Edwards	(United States) Louise Hedlund	10–8, 9–7
1937	Crawford Notch	(United States) Lois Smith Schieffelin	(United States) Esther Edwards	6–4, 6–0
1938	Crawford Notch	(United States) Kay Hubbell	(United States) Mary Cape Hall	6–2, 6–2
1939	Crawford Notch	(United States) Lonnie Myers	(United States) Kay Hubbell (2)	3–6, 6–2, 6–3
1940	Crawford Notch	(United States) Kay Hubbell (3)	(United States) Lonnie Myers	6–4, 6–2
1948	Crawford Notch	(United States) Kay Hubbell (4)	(United States) Lois Felix	7–5, 6–2
New Hampshire State Championships
1955	Crawford Notch	(United States) Lois Felix	(United States) Kay Hubbell	10–8, 6–4
1956	Crawford Notch	(United States) Lois Felix (2)	(United States) Kay Hubbell	6–2, 6–3
1957	Crawford Notch	(United States) Kay Hubbell (5)	(United States) Mary Pilliard Richards	6–1, 2–6, 6–3
1958	Crawford Notch	(United States) Lois Felix (3)	(United States) Kay Hubbell	6–4, 6–1
1959	Crawford Notch	(United States) Kay Hubbell (6)	(United States) Mary Pilliard Richards	6–0, 6–4
1960	Crawford Notch	(United States) Kay Hubbell (7)	(United States) Florence Blanchard	6–0, 6–0
1964	Concord	(United States) Carol Pierce	(United States) Nolie Howard	6–1, 6–2

== See also ==
- White Mountains Tennis Championships
