= Wilder-Holton House =

Historic house in New Hampshire, United States

- U.S. National Register of Historic Places
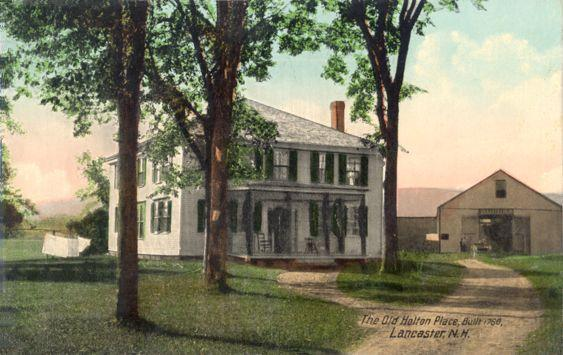

- Location within New Hampshire Location within the United States
- Location: 226 Main St., Lancaster, New Hampshire
- Coordinates: 44°30′11″N 71°34′41″W
- Area: less than one acre
- Built: 1780
- Architectural style: Federal
- NRHP reference No.: 75000231
- Added to NRHP: June 11, 1975

The Wilder-Holton House is a historic house museum at 226 Main Street in Lancaster, New Hampshire. Built in 1780, this two-story timber-frame house is believed to be the first two-story house built in the area, and to be the oldest surviving house in Coos County. It was listed on the National Register of Historic Places in 1975. The house is now owned by the Lancaster Historical Society, which operates it as a museum.

== Description and history ==
The Wilder-Holton House is prominently located at the northern end of Lancaster's Main Street, on the north side of the triangular junction of United States Routes 2 and 3. It is a two-story wood-frame structure, covered by a hip roof and finished in wooden clapboards. It is roughly square in shape, presenting five-bay facades in two directions. The main entrance faces east, sheltered by a single-story porch extending across three bays. There are presently three chimneys, although the remains of a large central chimney are found in the basement. The interior is presently arranged as a center-hall plan, and includes a large ballroom space on the second floor.

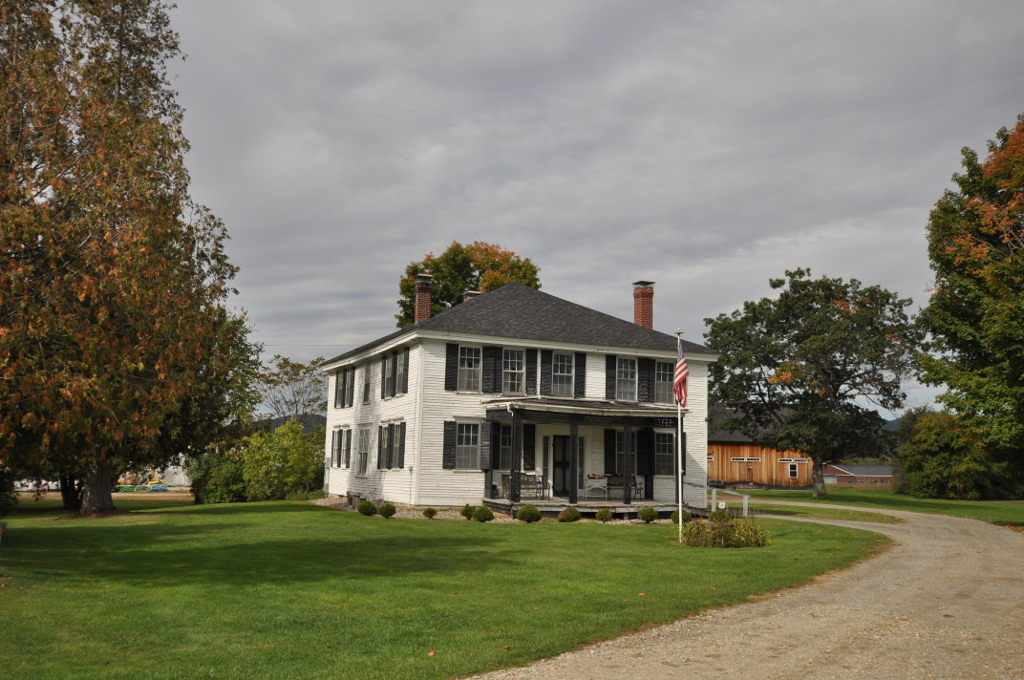
The house in 2016

The house was built in 1780 by Jonas Wilder, and is believed to be the first two-story building to be erected in what is now Coos County. It is also the oldest known surviving house in the county, earlier single-story buildings having succumbed. The house was a prominent local meeting point, serving in the 1790s for religious services before a church was built, and as the site of town meetings. In the early 19th century it probably also served as a boarding house, primarily serving visitors to the nearby county courthouse. It was originally associated with a much larger agricultural land-holding, and was associated with farming until the early 20th century. It has been owned by the Lancaster Historical Society since at least the 1960s.

== See also ==
- National Register of Historic Places listings in Coos County, New Hampshire
- New Hampshire Historical Marker No. 84: Wilder-Holton House
