= White Mountains Tennis Championships =

Defunct tennis tournament
- Tour: USNLTA Circuit (1890–1923) ILTF Circuit (1924-59)
- Founded: 1890; 135 years ago
- Abolished: 1960; 65 years ago
- Location: Crawford Notch, New Hampshire; Jackson, New Hampshire; Jefferson, New Hampshire
- Venue: Crawford Notch Tennis Club; Iron Mountain LTC; Waumbec Tennis Club

The White Mountains Tennis Championships or the White Mountains Championships was a men's and women's tennis tournament founded in 1890 as the East Side of the White Mountains Championships, a sanctioned event of the United States National Lawn Tennis Association. The tournament was first organised by the Iron Mountain Lawn Tennis Association, and held at the Iron Mountain LTC, Jackson, New Hampshire, United States.

== History ==
The first edition of the East Side of the White Mountains Championships was held in 1890. It was a United States National Lawn Tennis Association sanctioned event. The tournament was organized by the Iron Mountain Lawn Tennis Association, and held at the Iron Mountain LTC in Jackson, New Hampshire. This event ran until 1895, then was discontinued. In 1905 the tournament was revived at Crawford Notch, New Hampshire, approximately 20 miles (32 km) from Jackson, where the men's tournament was held in conjunction with the New Hampshire State Championships. The women's tournament continued to be held in Jackson until 1916 under its original name.

In 1924 the women's tournament was held in conjunction with the New Hampshire State Championships The combined tournament was known as the New Hampshire and White Mountains Championships, with players assuming both titles e.g. New Hampshire State Champion and White Mountains Champion. The joint tournament was held in Crawford Notch, New Hampshire, until the beginning of the Second World War. Following the war it was still being held in Crawford. By 1950 the New Hampshire State Championships and White Mountains separated into two events; the former continued to be played at Crawford, while the latter moved to the Waumbec Tennis Club at Jefferson, New Hampshire. With the onset of the open era looming, this tennis tournament was discontinued in 1959.

== Finals ==
=== Men's singles ===
(incomplete roll)

Year	Champions	Runners-up	Score
East of the White Mountains Championships
1890	(United States) George Arthur Hurd	(United States) Daniel George	6–1, 6–1.
White Mountains Championships
1910	(United States) Fred H. Harris	(United States) William Bradshaw Craigin	4-6, 6–4, 6–3, 6–2.
1911	(United States) Fred H. Harris	(United States) Fisher Goodhue	6-2, 6–3, 6–1.
New Hampshire State and White Mountains Championships
1912	(United States) Fred H. Harris	(United States) ?	?.
1913	(United States) James Newell G. A. Pratt	(United States) G. A. Pratt	6–4, 4–6, 7–5, 6–2.
1930	(United States) Percy Lloyd Kynaston	(United States) Anton Frederick Von Bernuth	6–0, 9–7, 6–0.
1935	(United States) Arthur B. Wright	(United States) David Burt	6–2, 6–0, 6–2.
1937	(United States) Robert Decker	(United States) Anton Frederick Von Bernuth	3–6, 4–6, 6–3, 6–2, 6–1.
1938	(United States) Sandy Davenport	(United States) Donald Meiklejohn	7–5, 6–1, 6–2.
White Mountains Championships
1939	(United States) Albert Henry Stitt	(United States) Fred (Fritz) Kuser	6–4, 5–7, 6–2, 6–4.
1951	(United States) Jack Kerr	(United States) Blair Hawley	6–4, 5–7, 6–2, 6–4.

=== Women's singles ===
(incomplete roll)

Year	Champions	Runners-up	Score
East of the White Mountains Championships
1915	(United States) Miss C.Small	(United States) Miss P. Mallet-Prevost	w.o.
1916	(United States) EA Gauthey	(United States) Edith White	6–0, 8–6.
New Hampshire State and White Mountains Championships
1924	(United States) Alice Jenckes	(United States) Mrs G. Walker	6–4, 6–3
1925	(United States) Gladys Taylor Hawk	(United States) Penelope Davies	6-3, 6-4
1926	(United States) Elsie Lang Pritchard	(United States) Mrs J. Bailey	6-2, 6-4
1928	(United States) Mrs J. Bailey	(United States) Christina Alvarez Stanwix	6-3, 3–6, 8–6
1929	(United States) Rosamond Newton	(United States) Anne Hollis	6–0, 6–1
1930	(United States) Gladys Taylor Hawk	(United States) Margaret Cluett	6–0, 6–2
1933	(United States) Ottilie Gaertner	(United States) Mariette Arguimbau	6-2 6-1
1934	(United States) Eunice Dean	(United States) Lydia Kayser	6–3, 6–4
1935	(United States) Mary Whittemore	(United States) Ottilie Gaertner	6–3, 6–1
1936	(United States) Esther Edwards	(United States) Louise Hedlund	10–8, 9–7
1937	(United States) Lois Smith Schieffelin	(United States) Esther Edwards	6–4, 6–0
1938	(United States) Kay Hubbell	(United States) Mary Cape Hall	6–2, 6–2
1939	(United States) Lonnie Myers	(United States) Kay Hubbell	3–6, 6–2, 6–3
1940	(United States) Kay Hubbell	(United States) Lonnie Myers	6–4, 6–2
1948	(United States) Kay Hubbell	(United States) Lois Felix	7–5, 6–2

=== Women's doubles ===
(Incomplete roll)

Year	Champions	Runners-up	Score
East of the White Mountains Championships
1915	(United States) Miss J.Gott (United States) Edith White	(United States) Miss Jacobson (United States) Miss Ullman	6–2, 6–1
1916	(United States) Miss E.A. Gauthey (United States) Edith White	(United States) Miss M Jacobson (United States) Miss L Stronse	6–3, 6–1

=== Mixed doubles ===
(Incomplete roll)

Year	Champions	Runners-up	Score
East of the White Mountains Championships
1915	(United States) P.W. Martin (United States) Miss C.Small	(United States) Lyle Leverich (United States) Miss Edith White	6–4, 6–2, 6–4.
1916	(United States) W.H. Brown (United States) Miss E.A. Gauthey	(Canada) Arthur John Veysey (United States) Miss M. Ayres	default.
White Mountains Championships
1951	(United States) Mike Blanchard (United States) Mrs. Blanchard	(United States) William Chick jr. (United States) Mrs. William Chick jr	6–3, 6–4

== See also ==
- New Hampshire State Championships
