= George A. Hurd =

American tennis player

George Hurd
- Full name: George Arthur Hurd
- Country (sports): United States
- Born: August 20, 1869; Brooklyn, New York, United States
- Died: November 15, 1929 (age 60); New York City, United States
- Turned pro: 1886 (amateur tour)
- Retired: 1900

Singles
- Career record: 56–23
- Career titles: 5

Grand Slam singles results
- US Open: 1R (1889)

George Arthur Hurd (August 29, 1869 – November 15, 1929) was an American businessman and amateur lawn tennis player who competed at the 1889 U.S. National Championships. He was also finalist at the U.S. Intercollegiate Championships the same year. He was active from 1886 to 1900 and won 5 singles titles.

== Tennis career ==
George was born in Brooklyn, New York City on August 29, 1869, and later attended Yale University.

He won his first title on 1890 at the East Side of the White Mountains Championships.

His only Grand Slam appearance in singles came at the 1889 U.S. National Championships where he was defeated in the first round by Samuel T. Chase.

His career singles highlights include winning the Washington State Championships three times in 1894, 1897 and 1898. He won the Pacific Northwest Championships in 1896.

He died in New York City on 15 November, 1929 age 60.
