= Durgin Bridge =

- U.S. National Register of Historic Places
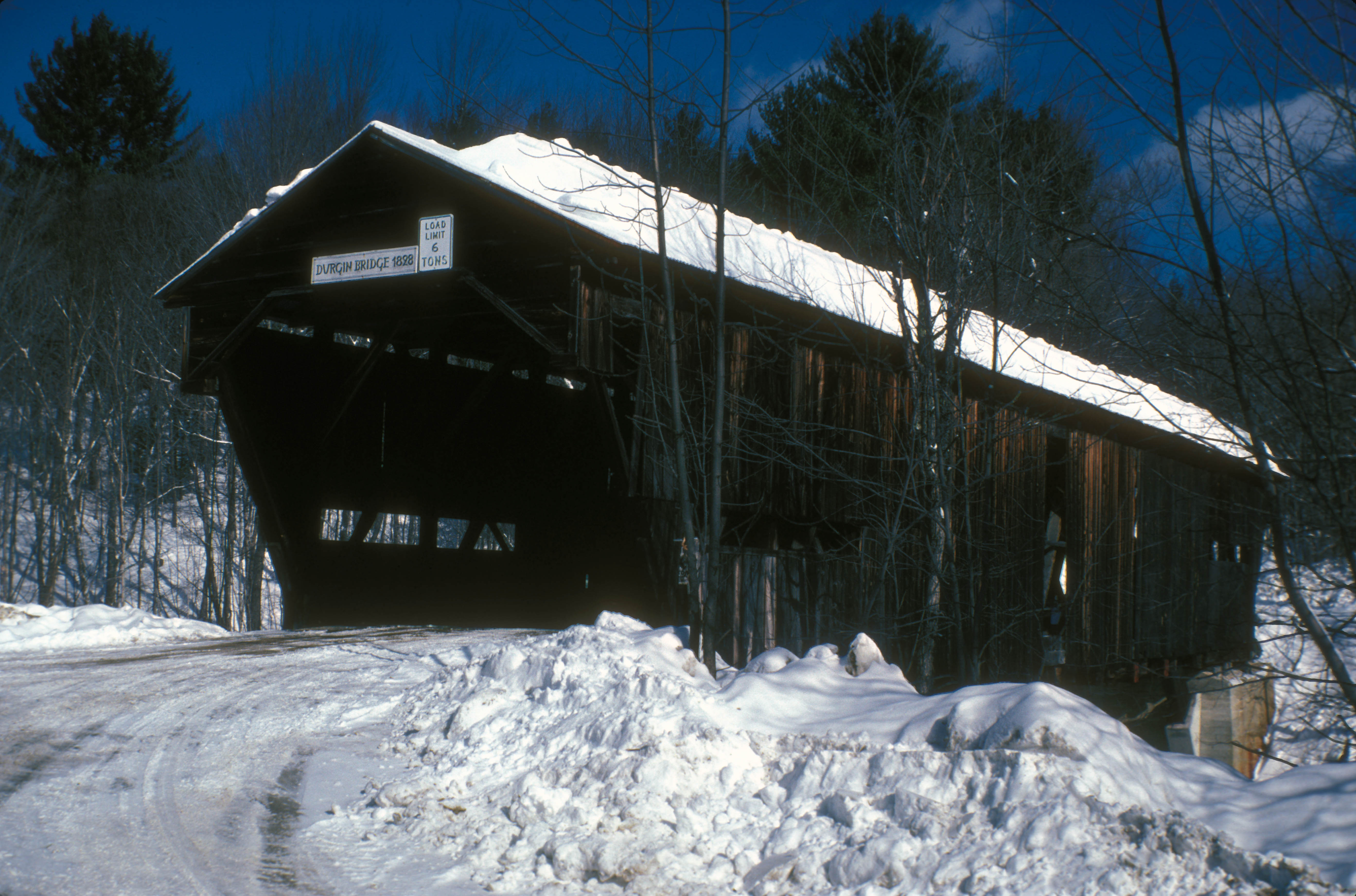
- 1970 photo

- Location within New Hampshire Location within the United States
- Location: Durgin Bridge Rd., Sandwich, New Hampshire
- Coordinates: 43°51′21″N 71°21′53″W
- Area: 0.1 acres (0.040 ha)
- Built: 1869
- Built by: Berry, Jacob
- Architectural style: Paddleford truss
- NRHP reference No.: 83001130
- Added to NRHP: September 22, 1983

The Durgin Bridge is a covered bridge carrying Durgin Bridge Road over the Cold River in eastern Sandwich, New Hampshire. Built in 1869, it is a rare surviving example of a Paddleford truss bridge, and one of the few surviving 19th-century covered bridges in New Hampshire. It was listed on the National Register of Historic Places in 1983.

== Description and history ==
The Durgin Bridge is located in an isolated rural area of eastern Sandwich. It spans the Cold River between road junctions with Foss Flats Road and Fellows Hill Road on the south side of the river, and Durgin Bridge Road, Bridge View Road, and River Road on the north side. It is a single-span structure with a total length of 110 feet (34 m) and a width of 19 feet (5.8 m). The span over the river is 96 feet (29 m) and the roadway width is now 14 feet (4.3 m), having been reduced from 16 feet by the addition of strengthening laminated arches in 1966. The bridge rests on concrete-faced stone abutments and is covered by a metal gabled roof.

The bridge was built in 1869 at one of two major crossing points of the Cold River (the other at Whiteface village to the northwest). This one was located not far from the mill of James Durgin, and eventually came to be known by his name. It replaced bridges that had been swept away by floods in 1844, 1855, and 1869. Jacob Berry, the builder, eliminated the central pier used by the earlier bridges, and raised the height of the bridge 10 feet (3.0 m). He had previously worked with Peter Paddleford, whose truss design he used for this structure. The laminated arches were added in 1968–69 to allow for the passage of heavy vehicles, including fire trucks. It is the only surviving 19th-century covered bridge in Sandwich.

== See also ==
- List of New Hampshire covered bridges
- List of bridges on the National Register of Historic Places in New Hampshire
- National Register of Historic Places listings in Carroll County, New Hampshire
- New Hampshire Historical Marker No. 82: Durgin Bridge
