= List of New Hampshire historical markers (76–100) =

- «51–75 101–125»

This page is one of a series of pages that list New Hampshire historical markers. The text of each marker is provided within its entry.

Contents
| No. | Title | Location | Coordinates |
|---|---|---|---|
| 76 | Salmon Portland Chase | Cornish | 43.4552°N 72.38747°W |
| 77 | Kimball Union Academy | Plainfield | 43.5436°N 72.25331°W |
| 78 | Odiorne's Point | Rye | 43.04828°N 70.72717°W |
| 79 | Matthew Thornton 1741–1803 | Merrimack | 42.84042°N 71.49088°W |
| 80 | Franklin Pierce 1804–1869 | Concord | 43.21507°N 71.54355°W |
| 81 | Center Meeting House | Newbury | 43.32087°N 72.03593°W |
| 82 | Durgin Bridge | Sandwich | 43.85573°N 71.3643°W |
| 83 | First Normal School in New Hampshire | Effingham | 43.76255°N 70.99848°W |
| 84 | Wilder-Holton House | Lancaster | 44.49708°N 71.57679°W |
| 85 | Nottingham – Chartered 1722 | Raymond | 43.04404°N 71.17805°W |
| 86 | Hampshire Pottery | Keene | 42.91894°N 72.27491°W |
| 87 | Crawford House | Carroll | 44.21805°N 71.41093°W |
| 88 | Charles Cogswell Doe 1830–1896 | Rollinsford | 43.22535°N 70.81447°W |
| 89 | Major General John Sullivan 1740–1795 | Durham | 43.13023°N 70.91809°W |
| 90 | First Summer Playhouse | Tamworth | 43.85963°N 71.26258°W |
| 91 | Birthplace of Daniel Webster | Franklin | 43.41398°N 71.69662°W |
| 92 | Hilton's Point – 1623 | Dover | 43.12159°N 70.82863°W |
| 93 | Surry Mountain Gold Mine and Lily Pond | Surry | 43.01926°N 72.32156°W |
| 94 | Birthplace of the Seventh Day Adventist Church | Washington | 43.17358°N 72.093°W |
| 95 | Chief Justice Harlan Fiske Stone | Chesterfield | 42.88684°N 72.4707°W |
| 96 | The Two-Mile Streak | Barrington | 43.19289°N 70.99815°W |
| 97 | Exeter Town House | Exeter | 42.98038°N 70.947°W |
| 98 | Henry Wilson – Vice President of the United States | Farmington | 43.38105°N 71.04979°W |
| 99 | Brigadier-General James Reed (1722–1807) | Fitzwilliam | 42.78052°N 72.14527°W |
| 100 | George Hoyt Whipple | Ashland | 43.69566°N 71.63104°W |
Notes • References • External links

== Markers 76 to 100 ==
=== 76. Salmon Portland Chase ===
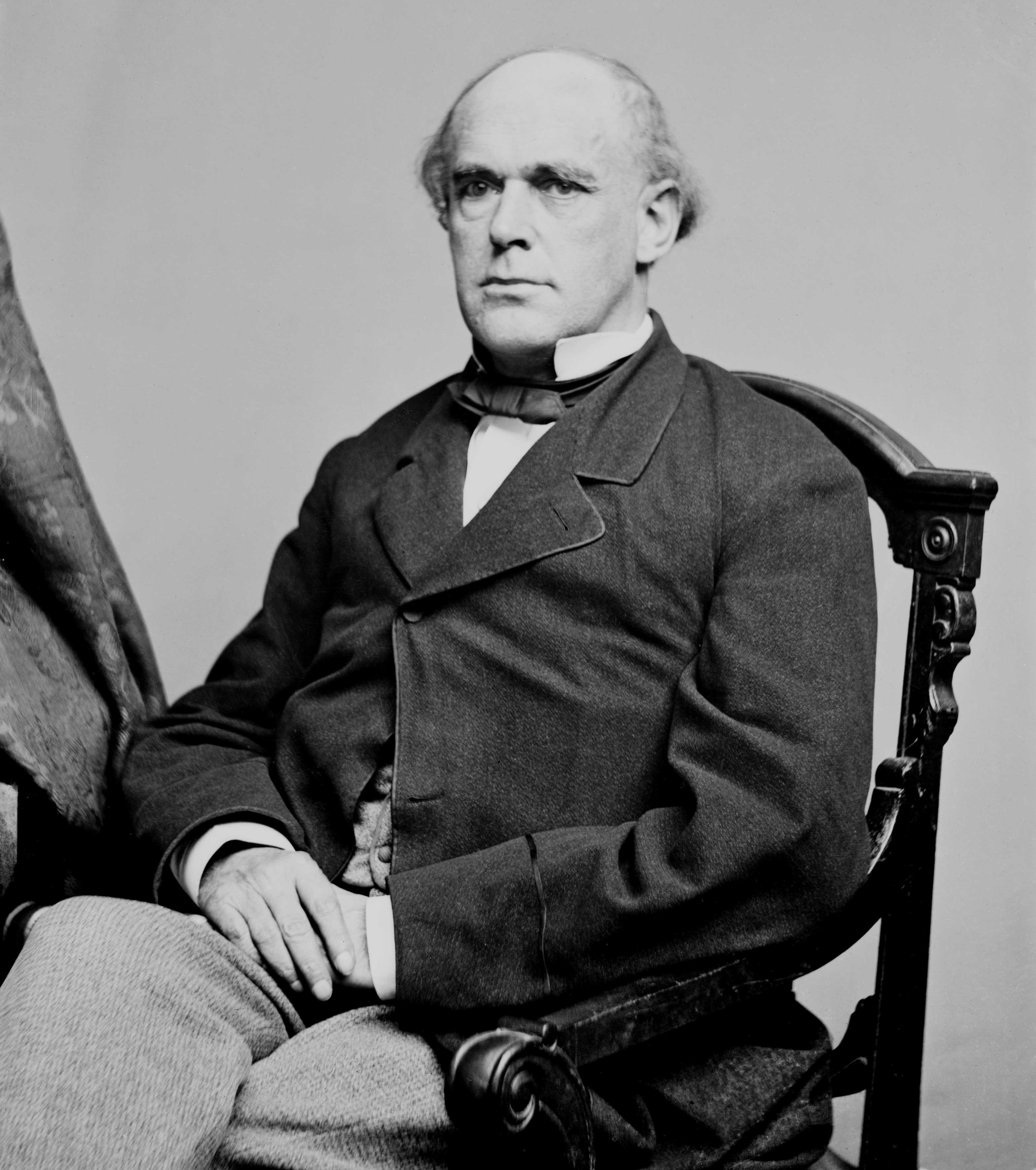
Photo of Salmon P. Chase by Mathew Brady

Town of Cornish

"In this house was born Salmon P. Chase, U.S. Senator from Ohio (1849–1855), Governor of Ohio (1855–1859), a founder of the Republican Party and leader in the anti-slavery movement. After serving as Secretary of the Treasury in Lincoln's cabinet, he was appointed Chief Justice of the United States. The Chase Manhattan Bank in New York was named in his honor."

Note: this marker was erected in 1971.

=== 77. Kimball Union Academy ===
Town of Plainfield

"This school, known first as Union Academy, was chartered June 16, 1813 'to train young men for leadership in the ministry.' The original building, located about 1,000 feet west of here and dedicated January 9, 1815, was destroyed by fire in 1824. Now known as Kimball Union Academy to honor benefactor Daniel Kimball, traditionally it has afforded a broad education to all who have attended."

=== 78. Odiorne's Point ===
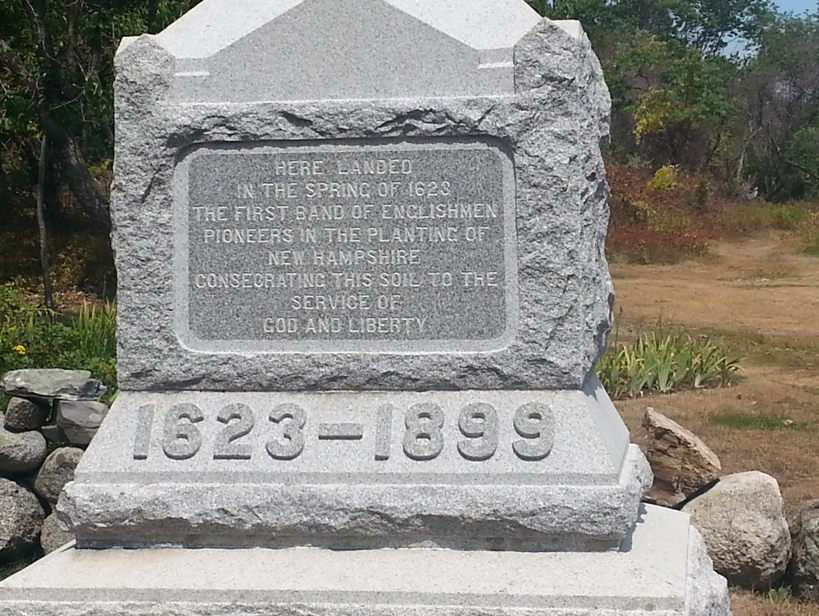
Memorial to the landing of the first English settlers at Odiorne's Point

Town of Rye

"This seaside place is located on N'dakinna, the traditional homeland of the Abenaki, Pennacook, and Wabanaki Peoples past and present. In 1623, David Thompson settled here to fish, farm, and trade under a grant from the British Council for New England, displacing the Native peoples. John Odiorne settle here ca. 1660 and his descendants farmed the property until 1942, when the federal government took the land to construct Fort Dearborn as a coastal defense. The fort was decommissioned after World War II and in 1972 the site was designated for recreation and dedicated as Odiorne Point State Park."

An Instagram post and photo by the Indigenous New Hampshire Collaborative Collective shows that the text on this marker has been revised since originally installed. (Note: The original marker text was: "Here, in the spring of 1623, was established New Hampshire's first settlement, Pannaway Plantation. David Thompson and other hardy fishermen came from England to colonize and develop trade. They built a stone manor house, smithy, cooperage, fort and stages for drying fish on nearby Flake Hill. Thompson's son, John, was the first child born in New Hampshire." Early historians believed the first native-born New Hampshirite, John Thompson, was born there; later he was found to have been baptized at St. Andrew's Parish in Plymouth, England, in 1619.)

=== 79. Matthew Thornton 1741–1803 ===
Town of Merrimack

"One of three New Hampshire men to sign the Declaration of Independence, Matthew Thornton, physician, soldier, patriot, agitated against the Stamp Act of 1765, presided over the Provincial Congress in 1775, served in the State Senate and as an associate justice of the Superior Court. The nearby monument honors his memory. He is buried in the adjacent cemetery. His homestead stands directly across the highway."

Note: this marker was erected in 1971.

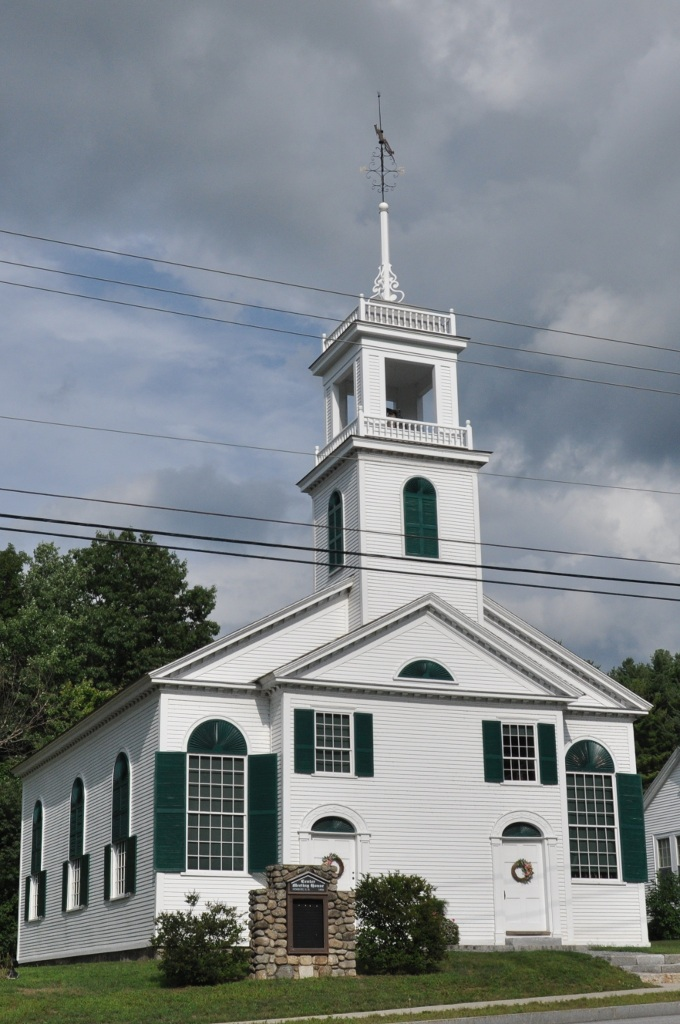
Center Meetinghouse in Newbury

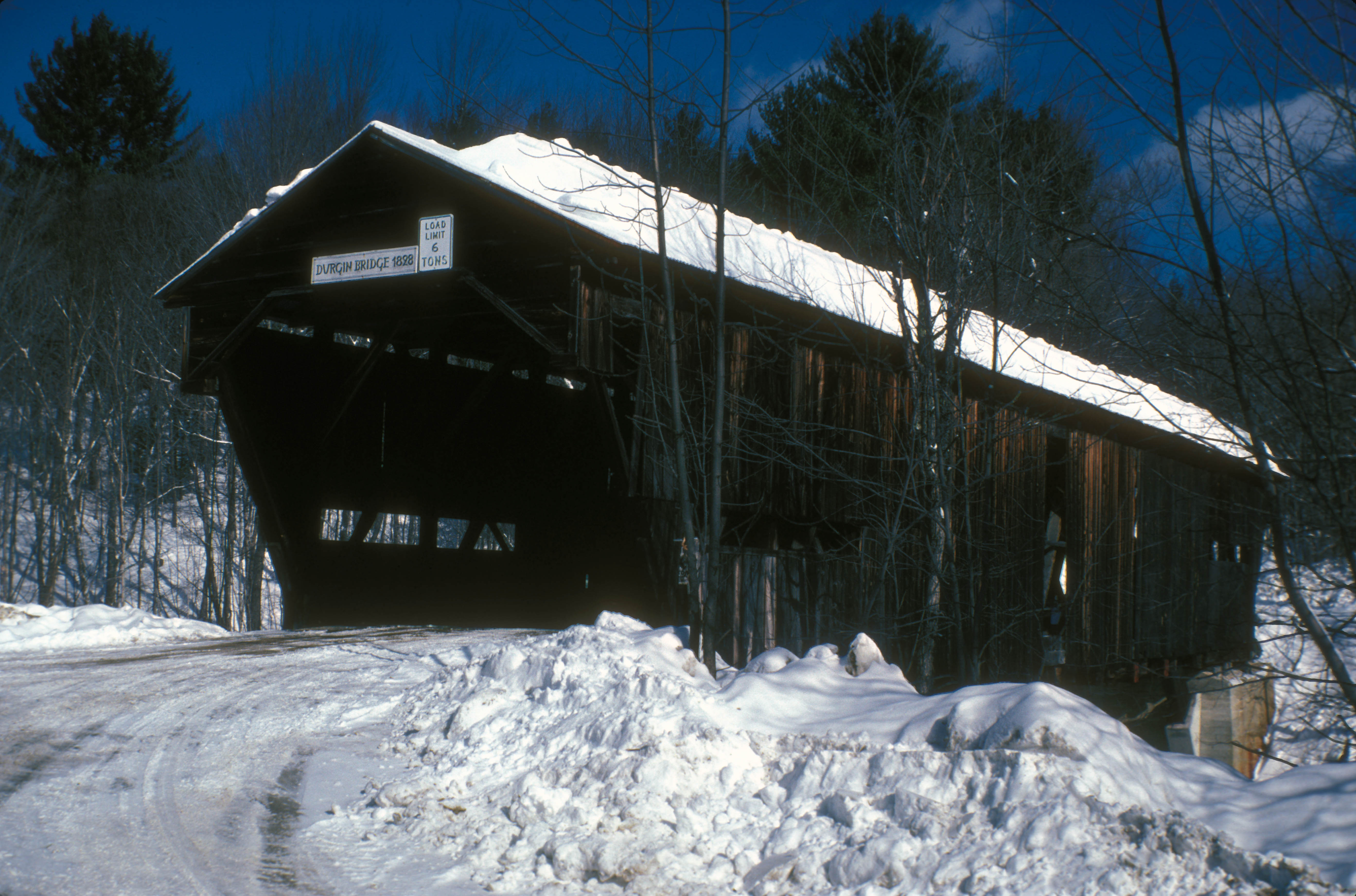
Durgin Bridge in Sandwich

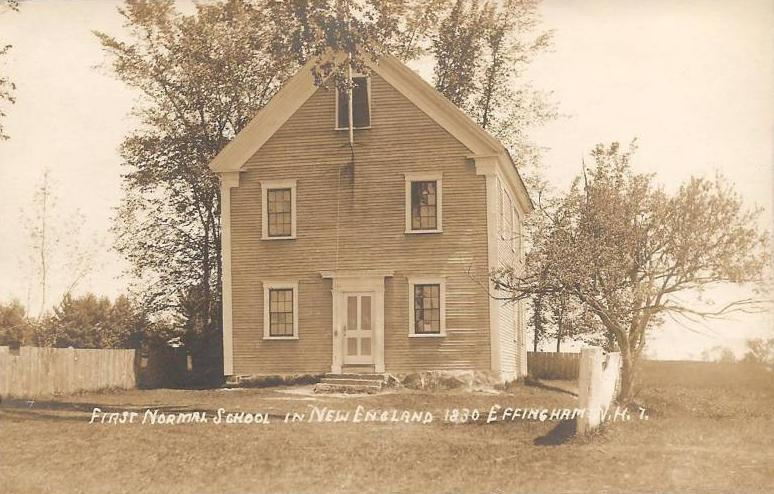
Effingham Union Academy building

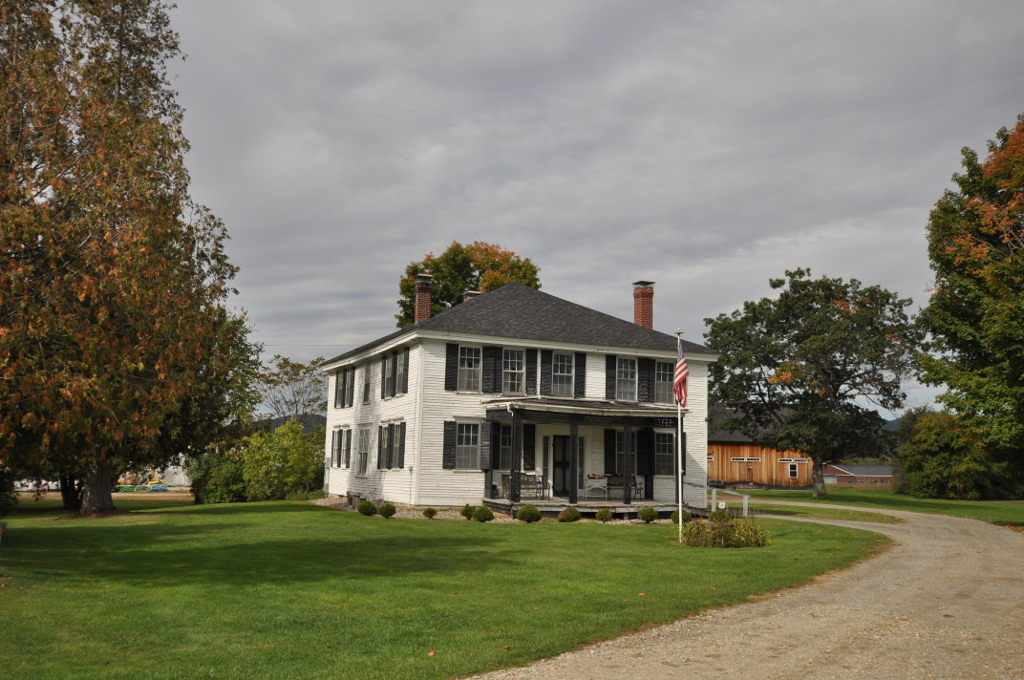
Wilder-Holton House in Lancaster

=== 80. Franklin Pierce 1804–1869 ===
City of Concord

"Fourteenth President of the United States (1853–1857)"
"Lies buried in nearby Minot enclosure. Native son of New Hampshire, graduate of Bowdoin College, lawyer, effective political leader, Congressman and U.S. Senator, Mexican War Veteran, courageous advocate of State's Rights, he was popularly known as 'Young Hickory of the Granite Hills.'"

Note: Originally installed in 1971, the sign was replaced in 2022 with a new marker containing the same text.

=== 81. Center Meeting House ===
Town of Newbury

"This edifice of Bulfinch design was rebuilt here about 1832 with old timbers from the Meeting House on Bly Hill. Its age, name, and denomination remain uncertain. The building has become known as a museum piece of the 1820 decade. Its beautiful high colonial pulpit, with pews facing the vestibule, renders it unique among New Hampshire churches."

=== 82. Durgin Bridge ===
Town of Sandwich

"Built by Jacob Berry of North Conway, this bridge is the fourth to span the Swift River here since 1820. Freshets in 1844, 1865, and 1869 destroyed the first three. The bridge is named for James Holman Durgin (1815–73) who ran a grist mill near it; drove a stage from Sandwich to Farmington; and was a link in the underground slave railroad, Sandwich to Conway."

=== 83. First Normal School in New Hampshire ===
Town of Effingham

"On the rise of the ground just west of here, on the 2nd floor of the old Effingham Union Academy Building (1819), was the First Normal School in New Hampshire. It was in this Academy in 1830 that James W. Bradbury, later United States Senator from Maine, took the school only on condition that it should be for the 'instruction and training of teachers.' The idea was his own and at that time entirely novel."

=== 84. Wilder-Holton House ===
Town of Lancaster

"This structure, erected by Major Jonas Wilder, from boards planed and nails wrought on the site, originally possessing a four-fireplace chimney and Indian shutters, is Coos County's first two-story dwelling. Construction was initiated on the noted 'Dark Day' of May 19, 1780, which caused work to cease temporarily. Successively a home, a tavern, a church, and a meeting place, it is now a museum."

=== 85. Nottingham – Chartered 1722 ===
Marker in town of Raymond

"Two miles north of Route 156 (one mile ahead) is Nottingham, home of Revolutionary War patriots, Generals Thomas Bartlett, Henry Butler, Joseph Cilley, and Henry Dearborn who was later a Congressman, Secretary of War, and Minister to Portugal. Monuments in Nottingham Square, five miles north, commemorate these men and the 1747 massacre of Elizabeth Simpson, Robert Beard and Nathaniel Folson by Indians of the Winnipesaukee Tribe."

Note: Since March 2022, this marker has been listed as "Retired".

=== 86. Hampshire Pottery ===
City of Keene

"About 150 feet north of here stood the famous Hampshire Pottery Works, founded by James Scolly Taft (Note: Taft (1844–1923) served as Mayor of Keene during 1903–1904.) for the manufacture of earthware. In 1878 Majolica ware was a major product, followed in 1883 by the addition of useful and decorative art objects and souvenir pieces. With the introduction in 1904 of the famous 'mat glaze,' Hampshire Pottery was recognized as a leader in its field."

Note: this marker was erected in 1972.

=== 87. Crawford House ===
Town of Carroll

"Abel Crawford and son, Ethan Allen Crawford, built the first Crawford House in 1828. It was run by Ethan's brother, Thomas, until sold in 1852. Fires in 1854 and 1858 destroyed the original inn and a replacement. Col. Cyrus Eastman erected the third and present Crawford House. (Note: The third and final Crawford House was destroyed by fire in November 1977.) It opened in July 1859 to continue a tradition of hospitality to White Mountain visitors. Among them have been Daniel Webster, Nathaniel Hawthorne, John Greenleaf Whittier and Presidents Pierce, Grant, Hayes, Garfield, and Harding."

Marker for General Sullivan along Route 108 in Durham, original wording

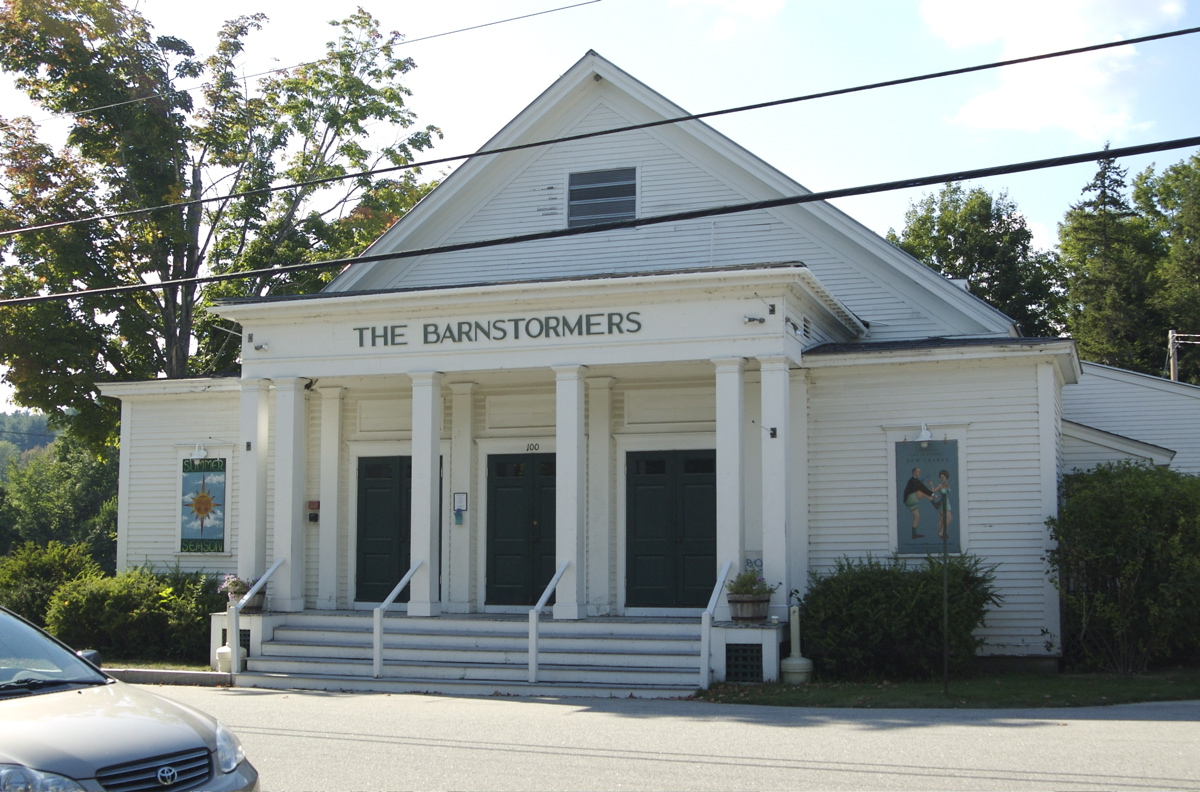
The Barnstormers Theatre in Tamworth

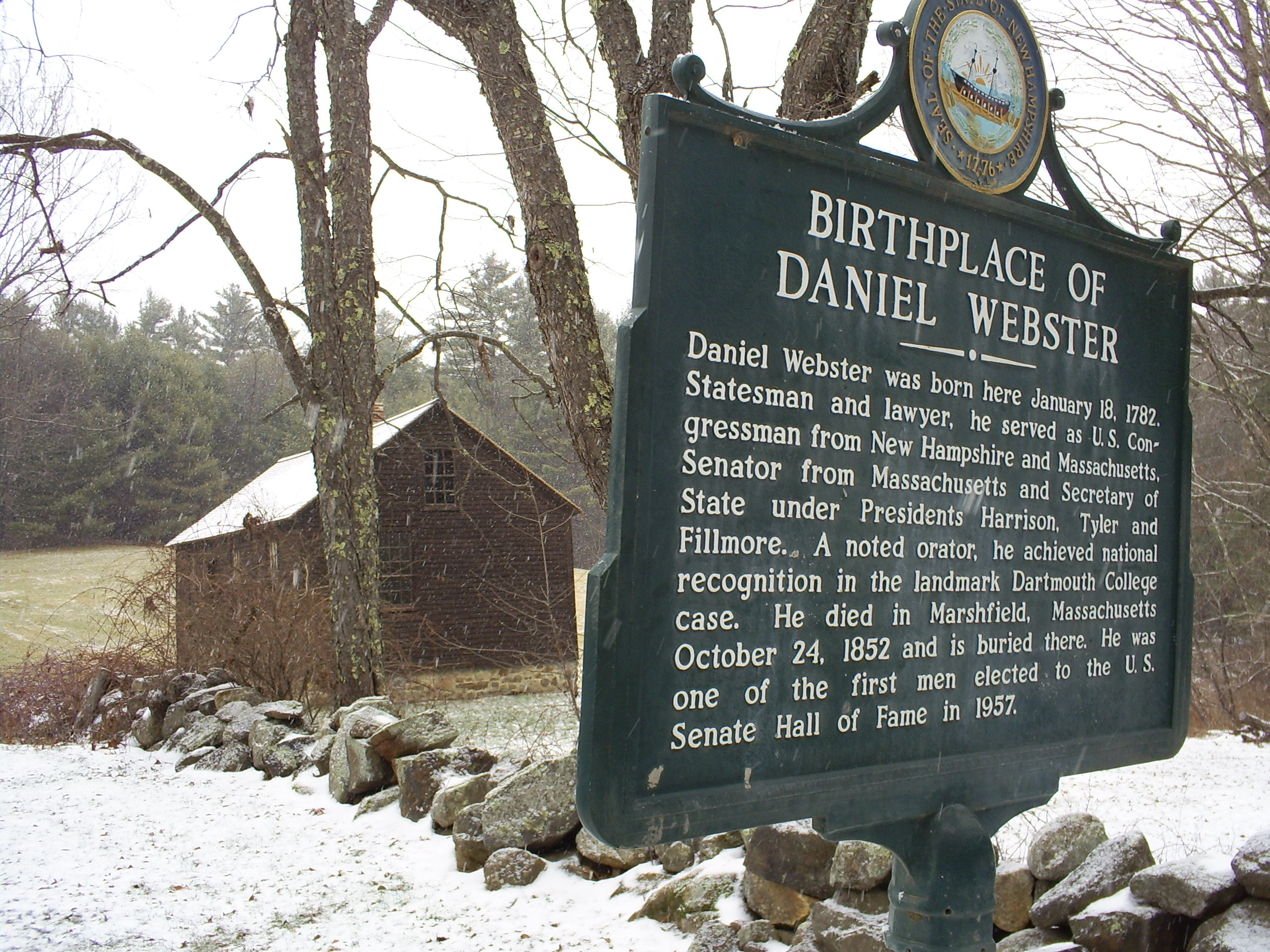
Marker for Daniel Webster's birthplace

=== 88. Charles Cogswell Doe 1830–1896 ===
Town of Rollinsford

"Rollinsford was the home of Charles C. Doe; jurist, Judge of the Supreme Court and Chief Justice from 1876–1896. Upon graduation from Dartmouth College in 1849, he studied law at Harvard. His outstanding opinions as Chief Justice indicate his unusual legal attainments and left an indelible impression on the law of New Hampshire."

=== 89. Major General John Sullivan 1740–1795 ===
Town of Durham

"Revolutionary patriot, soldier, politician, first Grand Master of Masons in New Hampshire, and a resident of Durham. He left the Continental Congress to serve under Washington from Cambridge (Note: See Washington Elm.) to Valley Forge. After retiring from the army, re-entered Congress, then served three terms as Governor of New Hampshire. Led fight for ratification of U.S. Constitution and became a federal district judge."

Note: prior to 2021, this marker had different wording. (Note: The original wording was: "Revolutionary patriot, soldier, politician, first Grand Master of Masons in New Hampshire, and a resident of Durham. He left the Continental Congress to serve under Washington from Cambridge to Valley Forge. Commanded at Rhode Island in 1778, and led campaign against the Six Nations in New York in 1779. Re-entered Congress, then served three terms as Governor of New Hampshire. Led fight for ratification of U.S. Constitution and became a federal district judge.")

=== 90. First Summer Playhouse ===
Town of Tamworth

"Nearby stands 'The Barnstormers' summer playhouse, the oldest in New Hampshire and one of the first in the nation. Opened in 1931, at one time the cast covered a weekly 80-mile circuit. Currently its performances are limited to this community. Founder of the theater was Francis Grover Cleveland, son of the 22nd President."

=== 91. Birthplace of Daniel Webster ===
City of Franklin

"Daniel Webster was born here January 18, 1782. Statesman and lawyer, he served as U.S. Congressman from New Hampshire and Massachusetts, Senator from Massachusetts and Secretary of State under Presidents Harrison, Tyler, and Fillmore. A noted orator, he achieved national recognition in the landmark Dartmouth College case. He died in Marshfield, Massachusetts October 24, 1852 and is buried there. He was one of the first men elected to the U.S. Senate Hall of Fame in 1957."

=== 92. Hilton's Point – 1623 ===
City of Dover

Location: Inside entrance to Hilton State Park (near the Little Bay Bridge)

"The first settlement at Dover was made here at the southernmost point of Dover neck and was called Hilton's Point after Edward and William Hilton. They were fishmongers from London who, in 1623, established their fishing industry at this scenic site."

Note: Since October 2023, this marker has been listed as "removed for construction" by the state.

=== 93. Surry Mountain Gold Mine and Lily Pond ===
Town of Surry

"To the east rises Surry Mountain, stretching four miles north and south. For many years, mines yielding small amounts of mica, copper, lead, silver and gold were operated along the ridge. In the saddle of the mountain, slightly north of the village, there is a Lily Pond, some 750 feet above the valley meadows. Often called a freak of nature, Lily Pond has been measured to be 80 feet deep in places."

Note: this marker was erected in 1973.

=== 94. Birthplace of the Seventh Day Adventist Church ===
Town of Washington

"In April 1842, a group of citizens in this town banded together to form 'the first Christian Society.' In the Adventist movement of 1842–43, they espoused the Advent hope. In January 1842, these Washington Sabbathkeepers, after meeting for many years as a loosely knit group, organized the first Seventh Day Adventist Church. Take second left, opposite the Common, 2.3 miles on the Millen Pond Road to the site of this building."

Note: this marker was erected in 1974.

=== 95. Chief Justice Harlan Fiske Stone ===
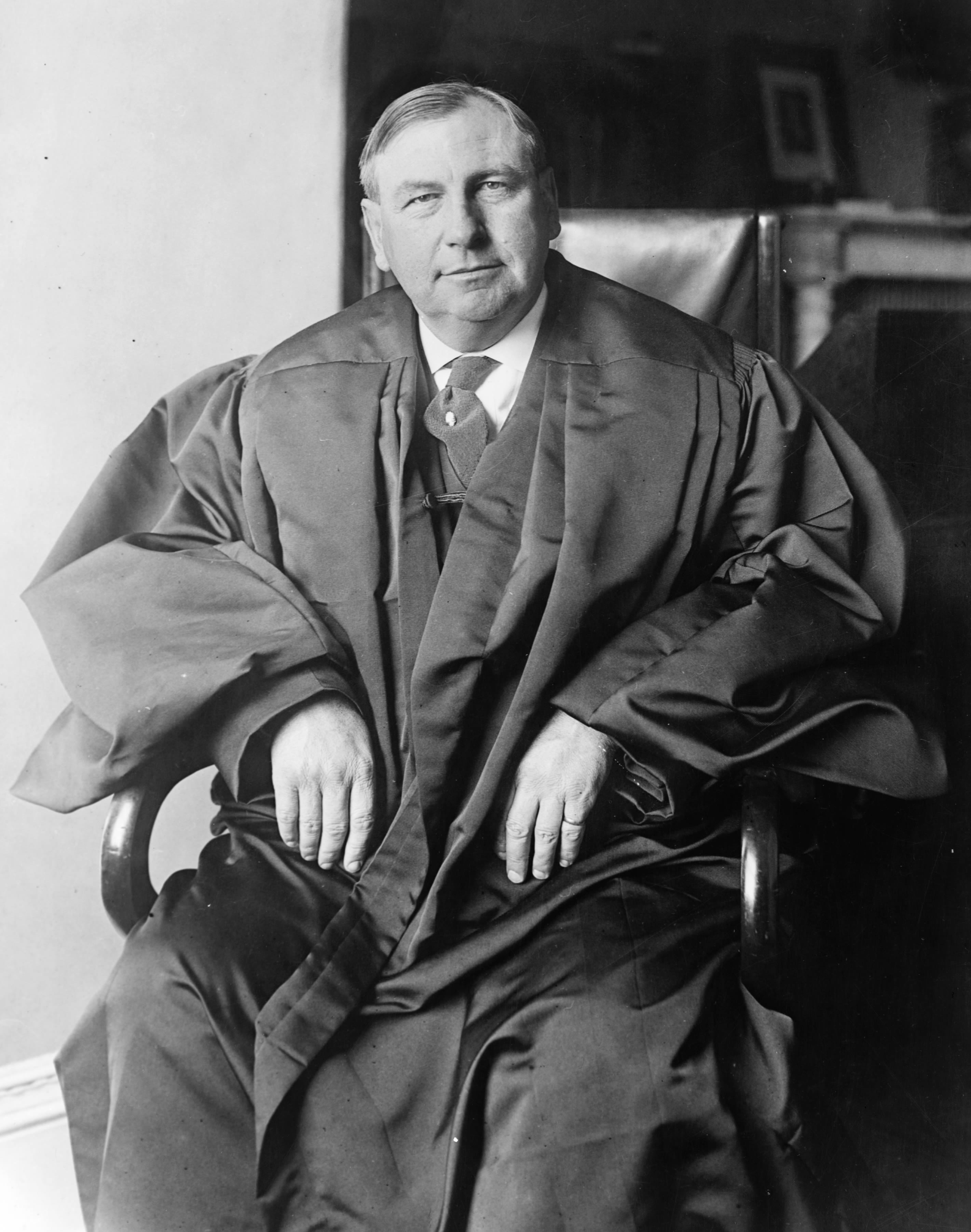
Harlan F. Stone as Chief Justice

Town of Chesterfield

"Born October 11, 1872, in a modest cottage 1.7 miles west of here on Horseshoe Road. Stone graduated from Amherst College and Columbia Law School, returning to the latter as Dean, 1910–1924. Attorney General of the United States in President Coolidge's Cabinet, he was appointed a Justice of the Supreme Court in 1924, and Chief Justice in 1941, serving until his death April 22, 1946. A teacher, lawyer, judge and judicial craftsman of the highest order, he held the affection and respect of the lawyers of the nation."

=== 96. The Two-Mile Streak ===
Town of Barrington

"Granted in 1719 to encourage industrial development in the province and called New Portsmouth, this two-mile wide strip of land was set aside to provide homesites for imported workers at the Lamprey Ironworks. Wood from this strip was converted to charcoal for the Ironworks. Absorbed by the 1722 Barrington Grant, the area retains its identity as The Two-Mile Streak. Descendants of early settlers still live here."

Note: this marker was erected in 1974.

=== 97. Exeter Town House ===
Town of Exeter

"The historic Town House of Exeter stood near this site. Here on January 5, 1776, the Provincial Congress adopted and signed the first state constitution thereby establishing an independent state government, the first of the thirteen colonies. The newly created Legislative Assembly met here during the Revolution. The Town House remained in use until replaced by a new structure in 1793."

=== 98. Henry Wilson – Vice President of the United States ===
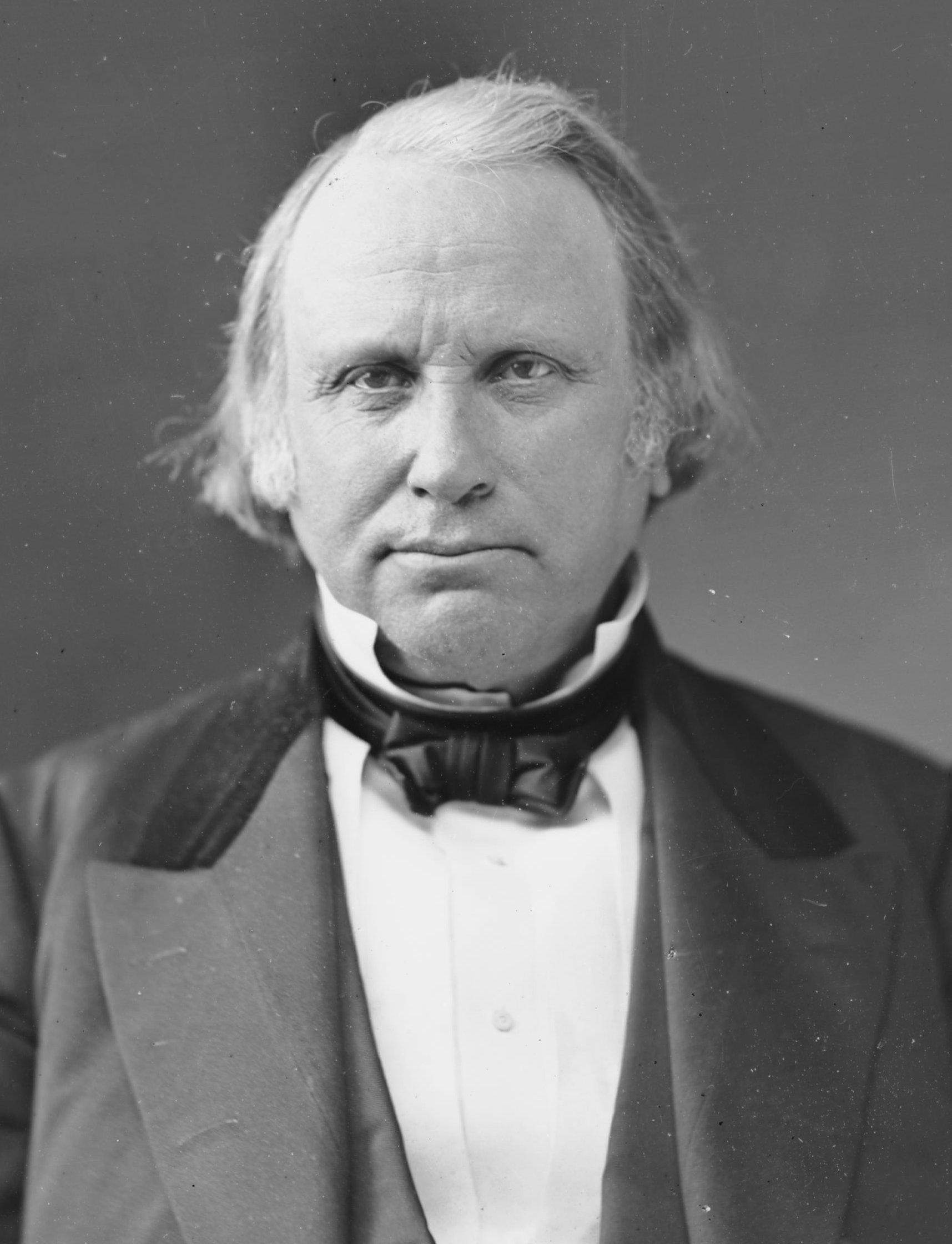
Henry Wilson

Town of Farmington

"Born in Farmington February 16, 1812, Jeremiah Jones Colbath, this self-educated farm boy changed his name when of age to Henry Wilson. He became a teacher, member of Congress, United States Senator and took office as Vice President under President Ulysses S. Grant March 4, 1873. He suffered a stroke and died in the Vice President's chambers in the Capitol, November 22, 1875."

Note: this marker was erected in 1975.

=== 99. Brigadier-General James Reed (1722–1807) ===
Town of Fitzwilliam

"This veteran Captain of the French and Indian War, born in Woburn, Mass., settled here about 1765 as an original proprietor of Monadnock No. 4, now Fitzwilliam. After the Battle of Lexington, he recruited several companies to form the Third New Hampshire Regiment which aided General Stark at the Battle of Bunker Hill in the Revolutionary War. He was commissioned a Brigadier-General following the siege of Boston and his engagement at the Battle of Ticonderoga."

=== 100. George Hoyt Whipple ===
Town of Ashland

"Nearby, on Pleasant Street, is the birthplace and childhood home of George Hoyt Whipple, pathologist, researcher, and teacher. Dr. Whipple's most significant research led to the development of the liver therapy for pernicious anemia. For his work, he shared the Nobel Prize for Medicine in 1934."
