= Crawford House (Crawford Notch, New Hampshire) =

Coordinates: 44.219982°N 71.41232°W

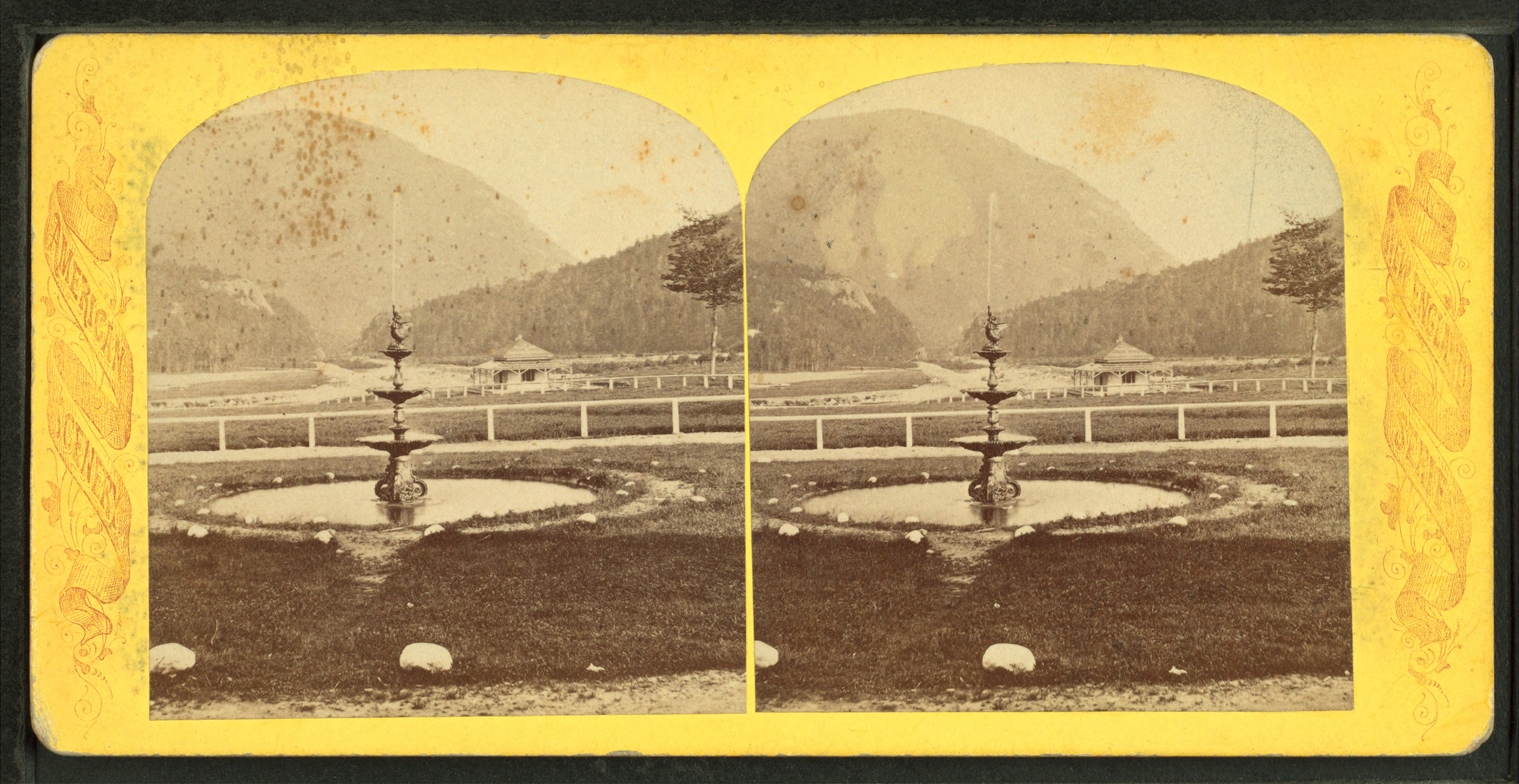
View of Crawford Notch from the Crawford House

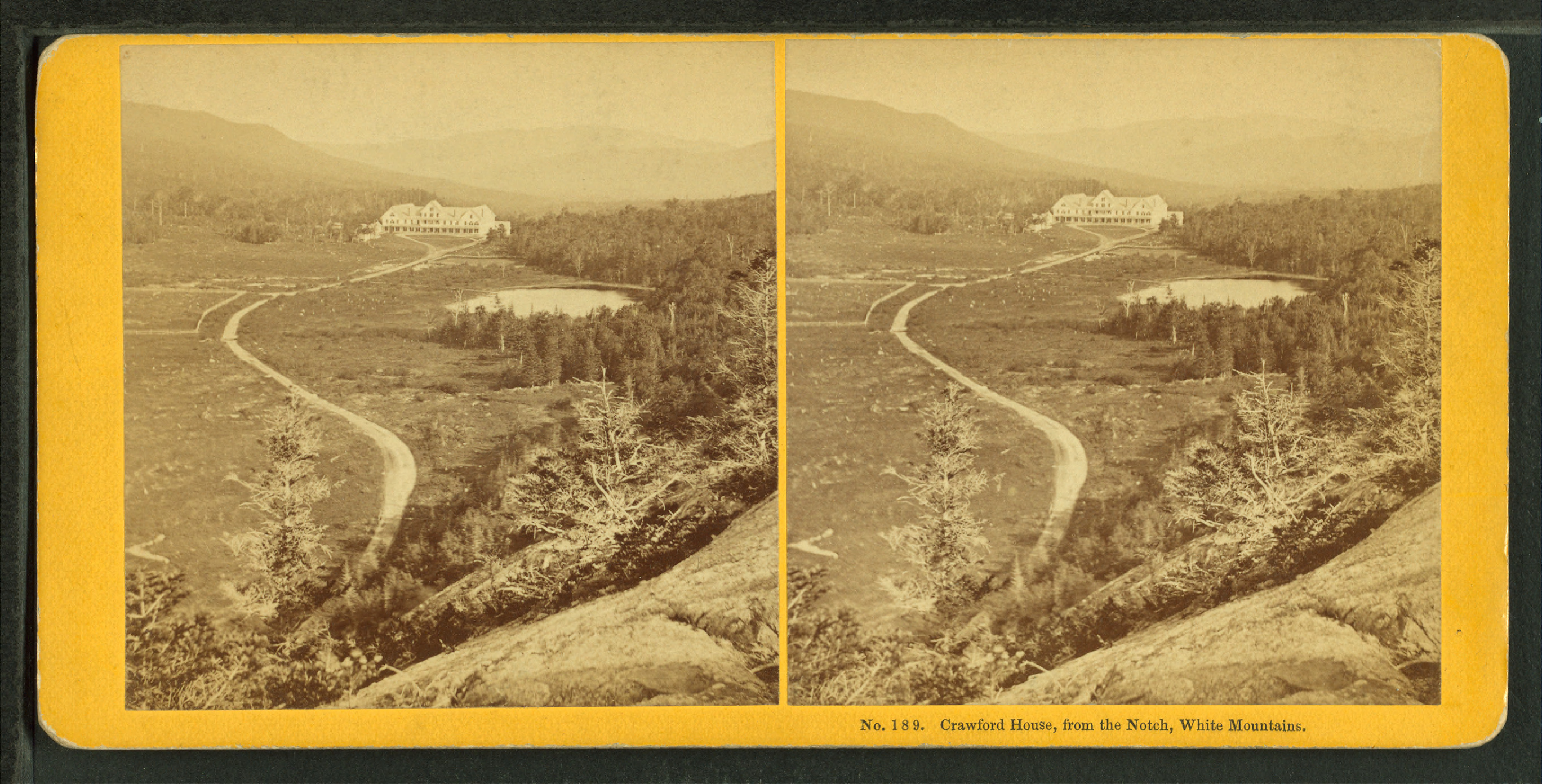
Crawford House from the Crawford Notch

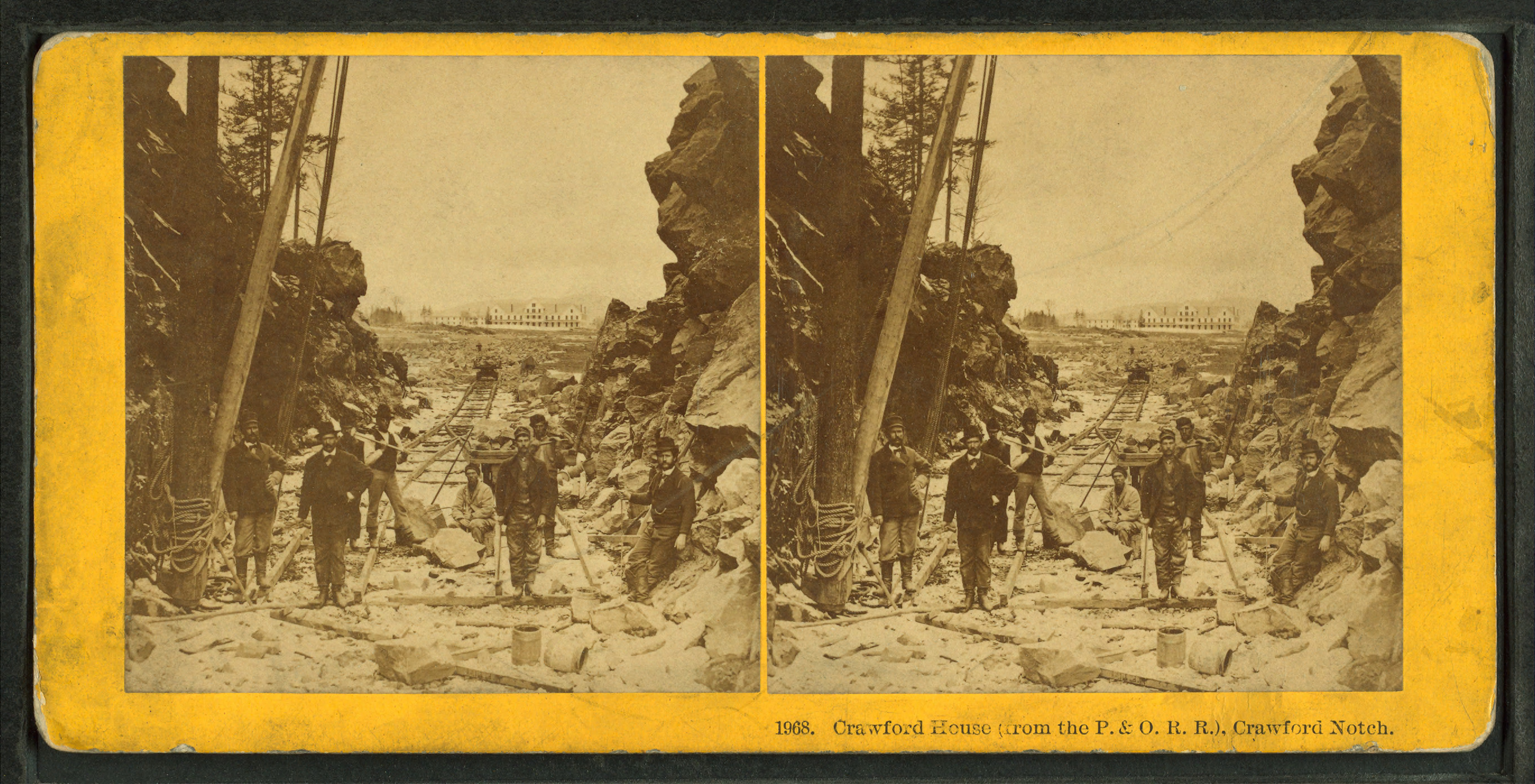
Crawford House from the P. & O.R.R. circa 1872

Crawford House was a grand hotel in Crawford Notch, New Hampshire, United States. The original hotel was built in 1850 and destroyed by fire in 1859. It was replaced by a second Crawford House resort that was the largest hotel in the White Mountains at the time. It was further expanded over time to accommodate 400 guests. The hotel featured wide porches and views of Crawford Notch. It eventually fell into disrepair and then closed in 1975. The hotel building was destroyed by fire in November 1977.

The property that Crawford House stood on was later acquired by the Appalachian Mountain Club, which built the extant Highland Center there. The neighboring Crawford Depot was added to the National Register of Historic Places in 1982.

== See also ==
- New Hampshire Historical Marker No. 87: Crawford House
