= Wimbledon Championships =

Annual tennis tournament held in London

- Official website
- Founded: 1877; 149 years ago
- Editions: 139 (2026)
- Location: Wimbledon, London; England (United Kingdom)
- Venue: All England Lawn Tennis and Croquet Club; Worple Road (1877–1921); Church Road (since 1922)
- Surface: Grass outdoors (Note: Except Centre Court & No. 1 Court during rain; each having a retractable roof)
- Prize money: £64,200,000 (2026)

Men's
- Draw: S (128Q) / 64D (16Q) (Note: In the main draws, there are 128 singles players (S) and 64 doubles teams (D), and there are 128 and 16 entrants in the respective qualifying (Q) draws.)
- Current champions: Jannik Sinner (singles); Harri Heliövaara; Henry Patten (doubles)
- Most singles titles: Roger Federer (8)
- Most doubles titles: Todd Woodbridge (9)

Women's
- Draw: S (128Q) / 64D (16Q)
- Current champions: Linda Nosková (singles); Guo Hanyu; Kristina Mladenovic (doubles)
- Most singles titles: Martina Navratilova (9)
- Most doubles titles: Elizabeth Ryan (12)

Mixed doubles
- Draw: 32
- Current champions: Marcelo Arévalo; Jeļena Ostapenko
- Most titles (male): Leander Paes (4); Vic Seixas (4); Owen Davidson (4); Ken Fletcher (4)
- Most titles (female): Elizabeth Ryan (7)

Grand Slam
- Australian Open; French Open; Wimbledon; US Open

Last completed
- 2026 Wimbledon

The Wimbledon Championships, commonly called Wimbledon, (Note: Formally known as The Championships, Wimbledon) is a tennis tournament organised annually in Wimbledon, London, by the All England Lawn Tennis and Croquet Club in collaboration with the Lawn Tennis Association. It is chronologically the third of the four Grand Slam tennis events each year, held after the Australian Open and the French Open and before the US Open. It is the oldest tennis tournament in the world and is widely regarded as the most prestigious.

Wimbledon has been held since 1877 and is played on outdoor grass courts; it is the only tennis major still played on grass, the traditional surface. It is also the only major that retains a night-time curfew for logistical reasons, with matches continuing until 23:00 BST under floodlighting since 2009.

The tournament traditionally takes place over two weeks in late June and early July, starting either on the last Monday in June or the first Monday in July and culminating with the Ladies' and Gentlemen's Singles Finals, scheduled for the Saturday and Sunday at the end of the second week. Five major events are held each year, with additional junior and invitational competitions also taking place. The tournament was not held during World War II, and was cancelled in 2020 due to the COVID-19 pandemic. Line judges were replaced by electronic calling systems in 2025.

Wimbledon traditions include a strict all-white dress code for competitors, and royal patronage. Strawberries and cream are traditionally consumed at the tournament, in latter years accompanied by champagne. Unlike other tournaments, advertising is minimal and low-key from official suppliers such as Slazenger and Rolex. The relationship with Slazenger is the world's longest-running sporting sponsorship, providing balls for the tournament since 1902.

== History ==
=== Beginning ===
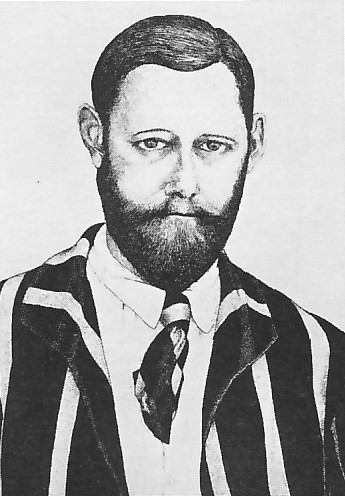
Spencer Gore, the winner of the inaugural Wimbledon Championship

The All England Lawn Tennis and Croquet Club is a private club founded on 23 July 1868, originally as "The All England Croquet Club". Its first ground was at Nursery Road off Worple Road, Wimbledon.

In 1876, lawn tennis, a game devised by Major Walter Clopton Wingfield a year or so earlier as an outdoor version of real tennis and originally given the name Sphairistikè (Ancient Greek for "skill in playing at ball"), was added to the activities of the club. In spring 1877, the club was renamed "The All England Croquet and Lawn Tennis Club" and signalled its change of name by instituting the first Lawn Tennis Championship. A new code of laws, replacing the code administered by the Marylebone Cricket Club, was drawn up for the event. Today's rules are similar except for details such as the height of the net and posts and the distance of the service line from the net.

The inaugural 1877 Wimbledon Championship started on 9 July 1877 and the Gentlemen's Singles was the only event held. 22 men paid a guinea to enter the tournament, which was to be held over five days. The rain delayed it four more days and thus, on 19 July 1877, the final was played. Spencer Gore, an Old Harrovian rackets player, defeated William Marshall 6–1, 6–2 and 6–4 in 48 minutes. Gore was presented with the silver challenge cup, valued at 25 guineas and donated by the sports magazine The Field, as well as a prize money of 12 guineas. About 200 spectators paid one shilling each to watch the final.

The lawns at the ground were arranged so that the principal court was in the middle with the others arranged around it, hence the title "Centre Court". (Note: A Centre Court did not yet exist during the first four years of the championship.) The name was retained when the Club moved in 1922 to the present site in Church Road, although no longer a true description of its location. However, in 1980 four new courts were brought into commission on the north side of the ground, which meant the Centre Court was once more correctly described. The opening of the new No. 1 Court in 1997 emphasised the description.

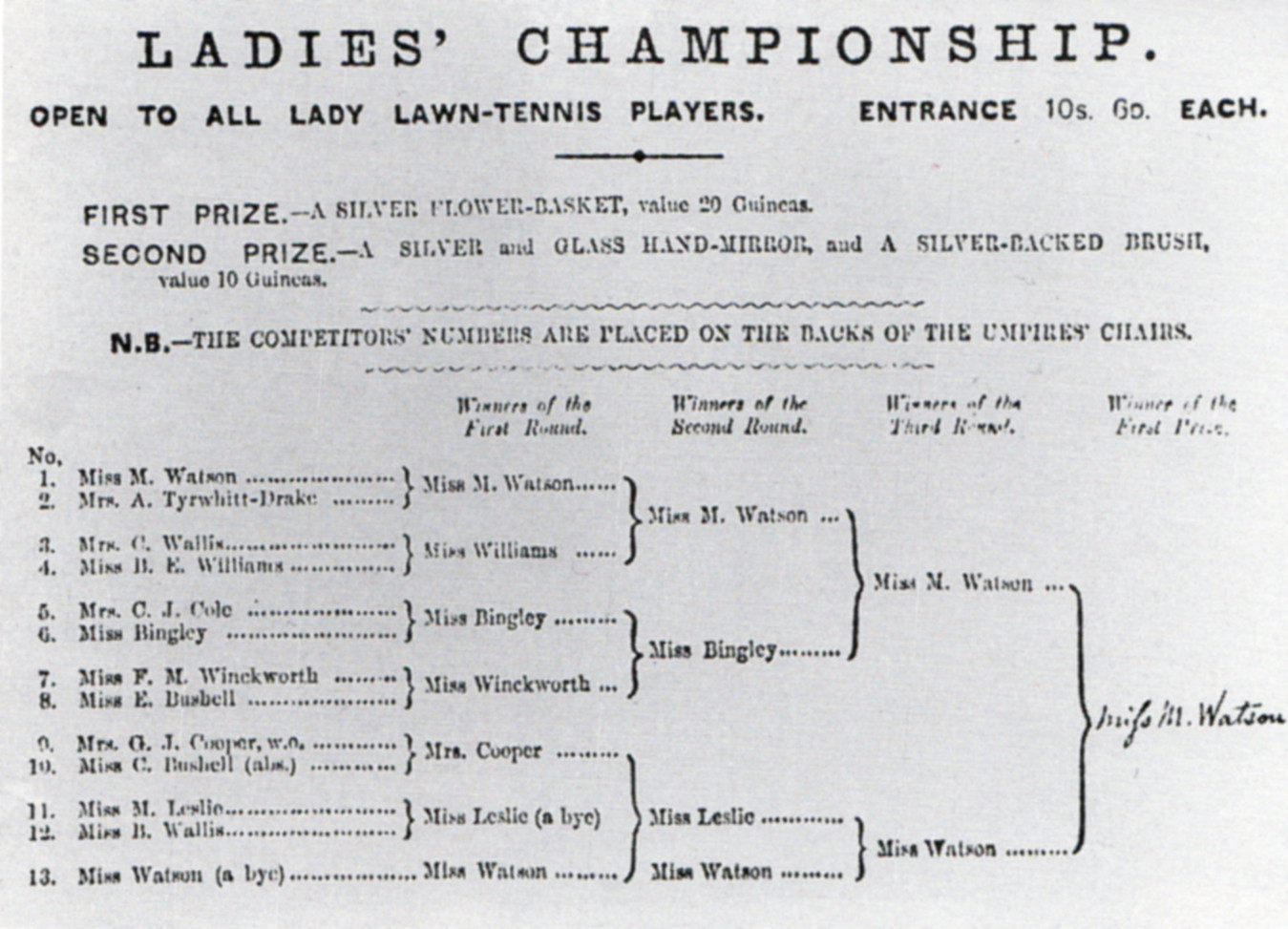
Ladies Championship, 1884. First prize, awarded to Maud Watson, was a silver flower-basket worth 20 guineas.

By 1882, activity at the club was almost exclusively confined to lawn tennis and that year the word "croquet" was dropped from the title. However, for sentimental reasons it was restored in 1899.

In 1884, the club added the Ladies' Singles competition and the Gentlemen's Doubles was transferred from the Oxford University Lawn Tennis Club. Ladies' doubles and mixed doubles events were added in 1913. The first black player to compete at Wimbledon was Bertrand Milbourne Clark, an amateur from Jamaica, in 1924.

Until 1922, the reigning champion had to play only in the final, against whoever had won through to challenge them. As with the other three Major or Grand Slam events, Wimbledon was contested by top-ranked amateur players; professional players were prohibited from participating. This changed with the advent of the open era in 1968. No British man won the singles event at Wimbledon between Fred Perry in 1936 and Andy Murray in 2013, while no British woman has won since Virginia Wade in 1977, although Annabel Croft and Laura Robson won the Girls' Championship in 1984 and 2008 respectively. The Championship was first televised in 1937.

Though formally called "The Championships, Wimbledon", depending on sources the event is also known as "The All England Lawn Tennis Championships", the "Wimbledon Championships" or usually just "Wimbledon". From 1912 to 1924, the tournament was recognised by the International Lawn Tennis Federation as the "World Grass Court Championships".

In the period of 1915–1918, no tournament was organised due to World War I. During World War II, the tournament was not held in the period 1940–1945. On 11 October 1940 one bomb hit a corner of the competitors' stand of the Centre Court. The championships did go ahead in 1946 even though the damage meant that 1,200 seats were lost. The organisers were unable to repair the damaged section until 1947 and the Centre Court was fully restored and renovated for the 1949 edition.

In 1946 and 1947 Wimbledon was held before the French Championships. It was thus the second Grand Slam tennis event of the year.

=== 21st century ===
Wimbledon is widely considered the world's premier tennis tournament and the priority of the club is to maintain its leadership. To that end a long-term plan was unveiled in 1993, intended to improve the quality of the event for spectators, players, officials and neighbours. Stage one (1994–1997) of the plan was completed for the 1997 championships and involved building the new No. 1 Court in Aorangi Park, a broadcast centre, two extra grass courts and a tunnel under the hill linking Church Road and Somerset Road. Stage two (1997–2009) involved the removal of the old No. 1 Court complex to make way for the new Millennium Building, providing extensive facilities for players, press, officials and members, and the extension of the West Stand of the Centre Court with 728 extra seats. Stage three (2000–2011) was completed with the construction of an entrance building, club staff housing, museum, bank and ticket office.

A new retractable roof was built in time for the 2009 championships, marking the first time that rain did not stop play for a lengthy time on Centre Court. The Club tested the new roof at an event called A Centre Court Celebration on Sunday, 17 May 2009, which featured exhibition matches involving Andre Agassi, Steffi Graf, Kim Clijsters, and Tim Henman. The first Championship match to take place under the roof was the completion of the fourth round women's singles match between Dinara Safina and Amélie Mauresmo. The first match to be played in its entirety under the new roof took place between Andy Murray and Stanislas Wawrinka on 29 June 2009. Murray was also involved in the match completed latest in the day at Wimbledon, which ended at 11:02 pm in a victory over Marcos Baghdatis at Centre Court in the third round of the 2012 Championships. The 2012 Gentlemen's Singles Final on 8 July 2012, between Roger Federer and Murray, was the first singles final to be partially played under the roof, which was activated during the third set. (Note: To date only four finals were played on a Monday due to rain: 1919, 1922, 1988, and 2001.)

A new 4,000-seat No. 2 Court was built on the site of the old No. 13 Court in time for the 2009 Championships. A new 2,000-seat No. 3 Court was built on the site of the old No. 2 and No. 3 Courts.

On 1 August 2011, the All England Club transferred all of its assets relating to The Championships to a separate though wholly owned subsidiary, The All England Lawn Tennis Club (Championships) Limited, also known as AELTC. Since that time, the club's activities have been formally conducted separately from those of The Championships.

In 2012, the All England Club hosted the Summer Olympic Games and became the first Olympic grass court tournament since tennis was reintroduced as an Olympic sport and the first to be held at a Grand Slam venue in the Open era.

In April 2013, Wimbledon unveiled its 'Master Plan', a vision in which to improve the championships over the next 10–15 years. This was in large part due to other Grand Slam tournaments such as the French Open and Australian Open also announcing expansion and re-development plans. Aspects of the master plan included new player and media facilities, expansion of the No.1 court including a new retractable roof, new catering and hospitality areas, additional floor to the museum building, construction of an underground car park and new indoor courts and also a total reconfiguration of the site including the relocation of a number of practice, clay and championship courts.

Part of the plan also includes acquiring the land of the adjacent Wimbledon Park Golf club for £65 million, so that the tournament qualifying matches can be played on site.

On 19 October 2018, it was announced that a tie-break will be played if the score reaches 12–12 in the final set of any match; this will apply to all competitions including in qualifying, singles, and doubles. In a related statement, it was announced that starting at the 2019 Championships, quad wheelchair competitions would become a permanent event.

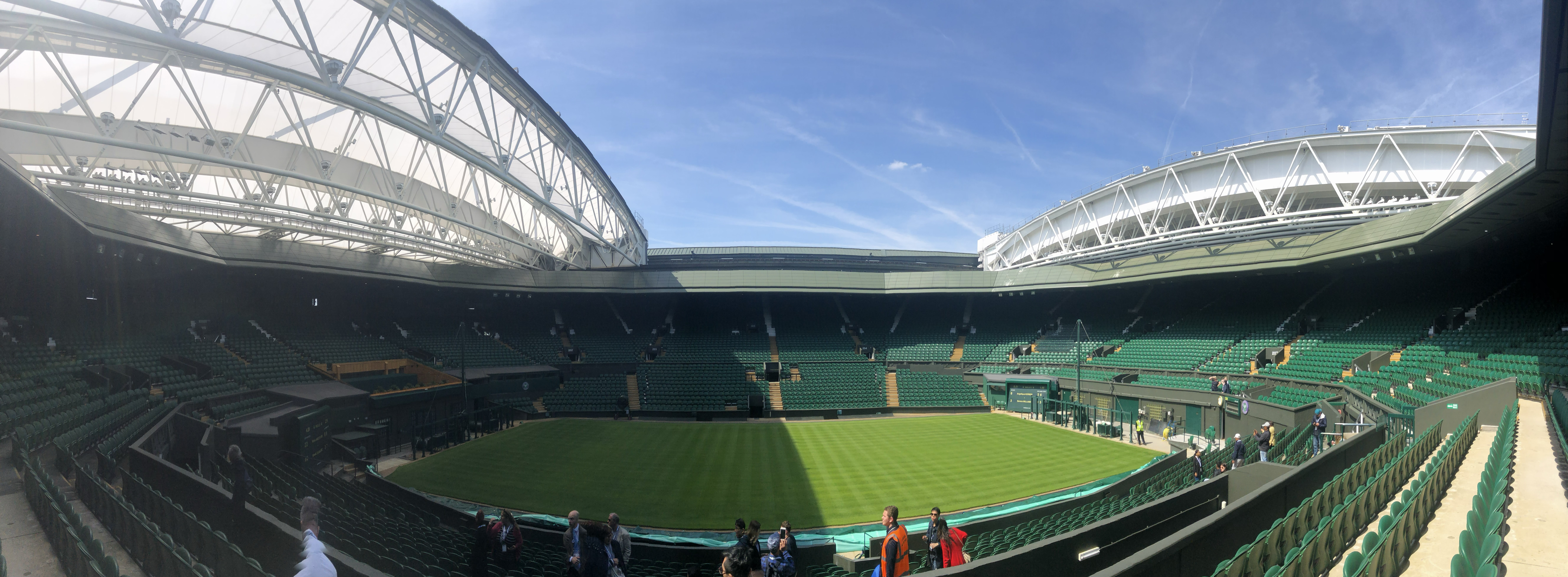
Centre Court at Wimbledon in May 2019

As a result of the COVID-19 global pandemic, the All England Club announced on 1 April 2020 that the entire grass-court season was to be cancelled as a public safety precaution until June 2021, marking the first time a Wimbledon tournament would not be played since World War II. Club officials considered playing the tournament behind closed doors, but this was ruled out in part because at least 5,000 people–including ballboys, officials, coaches, maintenance, and security–would have still needed to be on site to hold a functioning tournament. Former player and current All England Club board member Tim Henman told the Tennis Channel of the US that the board had carefully considered holding a closed-door Wimbledon. However, the sheer number of people who still would have needed to be on site led the board to realise "that wasn't going to be a workable option". Prior to the start of the 2003 tournament, the club began paying an annual insurance premium of £1.61m ($2 million) to cover losses from cancellation of Wimbledon in the event of a worldwide pandemic as a result of the SARS outbreak; it would receive an insurance payment of £114 million ($141 million) for the 2020 cancellation on expected losses of around £250 million ($312 million).

In April 2022, due to the 2022 Russian invasion of Ukraine, the All England Club announced that Russian and Belarusian players would be prohibited from competing in the tournament. Unlike the ATP and WTA, participation as neutral athletes is also prohibited. On 20 May 2022, the ATP, ITF, and WTA announced that they will not award ranking points for the tournament, as they considered the prohibition unilateral, and constituted discrimination against players based on nationality. On 31 March 2023, the ban on Russian and Belarusian players was lifted by the All England Club.

On 9 October 2024, it was announced that line judges would be replaced by electronic line calling technology on all courts starting at the 2025 tournament.

== Events ==
Wimbledon consists of five main events, four junior events and seven invitation events.

=== Main events ===
The five main events, and the number of players (or teams, in the case of doubles) are:

- Gentlemen's Singles (128)
- Ladies' Singles (128)
- Gentlemen's Doubles (64)
- Ladies' Doubles (64)
- Mixed Doubles (32)

=== Junior events ===
The four junior events and the number of players or teams are:

- Boys' Singles (64)
- Girls' Singles (64)
- Boys' Doubles (32)
- Girls' Doubles (32)

No mixed doubles event is held at this level

=== Invitation events ===
The seven invitational events and the number of pairs are:

- Gentlemen's Invitation Doubles (8 pairs Round Robin) (Note: The men who are eligible for the Gentlemen's Invitation Doubles are 35 years old and older.)
- Ladies' Invitation Doubles (8 pairs Round Robin)
- Senior Gentlemen's Invitation Doubles (8 pairs Round Robin) (Note: The men who are eligible for the Senior Gentlemen's Invitation Doubles are 45 years old and older.)
- Gentlemen's Wheelchair Singles
- Ladies' Wheelchair Singles
- Gentlemen's Wheelchair Doubles (4 pairs)
- Ladies' Wheelchair Doubles (4 pairs)

=== Match formats ===
Matches in the Gentlemen's Singles are best-of-five sets. In 2023 it was decided that Gentlemen's Doubles match formats will be changed from best-of-five sets to best-of-three sets due to complaints from partaking players; all other events are best-of-three sets. Up to and including the 2018 tournament, a tiebreak game was played if the score reached 6–all in any set except the fifth (in a five-set match) or the third (in a three-set match), in which case a two-game lead was needed. Since 2019, a final set tiebreak game is played if the score in the final set reaches 12–all. In 2022 it was decided all matches would have a final set tiebreak once the match reached 6–6, with a champions tiebreak taking place meaning the winner needs to get to 10 points and win by two points. If the score is 9–9 play continues until one player wins by two points.

All events are single-elimination tournaments, (Note: In a single-elimination tournament, a losing player or team is eliminated from the tournament.) except for the Gentlemen's, Senior Gentlemen's and the Ladies' Invitation Doubles, which are round-robin tournaments.

Up to 1921, the winners of the previous year's competition (except in the Ladies' Doubles and Mixed Doubles) were automatically granted byes into the final round (then known as the challenge round). This led to many winners retaining their titles in successive years, as they were able to rest while their opponent competed from the start of the competition. Since 1922, the prior year's champions were required to play all the rounds, like other tournament competitors.

== Schedule ==
Each year the tournament begins on the last Monday in June or first Monday in July, two weeks after the Queen's Club Championships, which is one of the men's major warm-up tournaments, together with the Halle Open, which is held in Halle, Germany, during the same week. Other grass-court tournaments before Wimbledon are Eastbourne, Great Britain, and Rosmalen in the Netherlands, both combining mixed events. The other women's warm-up tournament for Wimbledon is Birmingham, also in Great Britain. The men's event outside Europe before Wimbledon was the Antalya Open in Turkey. The only grass-court tournament scheduled after the Championships is the Hall of Fame Tennis Championships at Newport, Rhode Island, USA, which takes place the week after Wimbledon.

Since 2015, the championships have begun one week later than in previous years, extending the gap between the tournament and the French Open from two to three weeks. Additionally the Stuttgart Open men's tournament converted to a grass surface and was rescheduled from July to June, extending the grass court season. Wimbledon is scheduled for 14 days, beginning on a Monday and ending on a Sunday. Before 1982 it ended a day earlier, with the women's singles final on the Friday and the men's singles final on the Saturday. The five main events span both weeks, but the junior and invitational events are held mainly during the second week.

Traditionally, unlike the other three tennis Grand Slams, there was no play on the "Middle Sunday", which was considered a rest day. However, rain had forced play on the Middle Sunday four times, in 1991, 1997, 2004 and 2016. On the first of these four occasions, Wimbledon staged a "People's Sunday", with unreserved seating and readily available, inexpensive tickets, allowing those with more limited means to sit on the show courts.

In 2022, on the centenary of the tournament's move to its current site, routine scheduled play began on the "Middle Sunday". This was attributed to advances in grass technology and maintenance meaning the courts no longer required a day of recovery mid-tournament.

Before 2022, the second Monday at Wimbledon was often called "Manic Monday", because it was the busiest day with the last-16 matches for both men's and women's singles. Fans had a pick of watching on a single day any of the best 32 players left, which was also unique in a Grand Slam singles competition.

From 2025, Wimbledon is the only remaining Grand Slam championship starting on a traditional Monday schedule.

== Curfew ==
Unlike the other three majors, all matches have to finish before 11:00pm since 2009 to avoid an overtime late night finish. Wimbledon is the only Grand Slam that retains a night-time curfew. The curfew is in place to protect local residents from late-night disturbances. When the roof was built on Centre Court—something that allowed matches to continue at night under the lights—the local Merton Council put the time limit into place when granting planning permission for the roof. A statement from Wimbledon in 2018 read: "The 11pm curfew is a Planning Condition applied to balance the consideration of the local residents with the scale of an international tennis event that takes place in a residential area. The challenge of transport connectivity and getting visitors home safely is also a key consideration."

== Players and seeding ==
Both the men's and ladies' singles consist of 128 players. Players and doubles pairs are admitted to the main events on the basis of their international rankings, with 104 direct entries into the men's and 108 into the ladies' competitions. Both tournaments have 8 wild card entrants, with the remainder in each made up of qualifiers. Since the 2001 tournament, 32 players have been given seedings in the Gentlemen's and Ladies' singles, 16 teams in the doubles events. The system of seeding was introduced during the 1924 Wimbledon Championships. This was a simplified version allowing countries to nominate four players who were placed in different quarters of the draw. This system was replaced for the 1927 Wimbledon Championships and from then on players were seeded on merit. The first players to be seeded as no. 1 were René Lacoste and Helen Wills.

The Committee of Management decide which players receive wildcards. Usually, wild cards are players who have performed well during previous tournaments or would stimulate public interest in Wimbledon by participating. The only wild card to win the Gentlemen's Singles Championship was Goran Ivanišević in 2001. Players and pairs who neither have high enough rankings nor receive wild cards may participate in a qualifying tournament held one week before Wimbledon at the Bank of England Sports Ground in Roehampton. The singles qualifying competitions are three-round events. From 2019 singles qualification will increase to 128 players and no doubles qualification will occur. Previously the same-sex doubles competitions lasted for only two rounds. There is no qualifying tournament for Mixed Doubles. The furthest that any qualifier has progressed in a Singles tournament is the semi-final round: John McEnroe in 1977 (Gentlemen's Singles), Vladimir Voltchkov in 2000 (Gentlemen's Singles), and Alexandra Stevenson in 1999 (Ladies' Singles).

Players are admitted to the junior tournaments upon the recommendations of their national tennis associations, on their World Tennis world rankings and, in the case of the singles events, on the basis of a qualifying competition. The Committee of Management determines which players may enter the four invitational events.

The Committee seeds the top players and pairs on the basis of their rankings, but it could change the seedings based on a player's previous grass court performance. Since 2002 a seeding committee has not been required for the Gentlemen's Singles following an agreement with the ATP, and since the 2021 tournament, the seeding has followed the same process as the ATP rankings. From 2002 to 2019, the top 32 players (according to the ATP rankings) were seeded according to a formula that more heavily weighted previous grass-court tournaments: ATP Entry System Position points + 100% points earned for all grass court tournaments in the past 12 months + 75% points earned for the best grass court tournament in the 12 months before that.

A majority of the entrants are unseeded. Only two unseeded players have won the Gentlemen's Singles: Boris Becker in 1985 and Goran Ivanišević in 2001. In 1985 there were only 16 seeds and Becker was ranked 20th; Ivanišević was ranked 125th when he won as a Wild Card entrant, although he had previously been a finalist three times, and been ranked no. 2 in the world; his low ranking was due to having been hampered by a persistent shoulder injury for three years, which had only just cleared up. In 1996, the title was won by Richard Krajicek, who was originally unseeded (ranked 17th, and only 16 players were seeded) but was promoted to a seeded position (still with the number 17) when Thomas Muster withdrew before the tournament. In 2023, the Ladies' Singles title was captured for the first time by an unseeded player, Markéta Vondroušová, who ranked 42 in the world. Previously, the lowest seeded female champion was Venus Williams, who won in 2007 as the 23rd seed; Williams was returning from an injury that had prevented her playing in previous tournaments, giving her a lower ranking than she would normally have had. Unseeded pairs have won the doubles titles on numerous occasions; the 2005 Gentlemen's Doubles champions were not only unseeded, but also (for the first time ever) qualifiers.

== Grounds ==
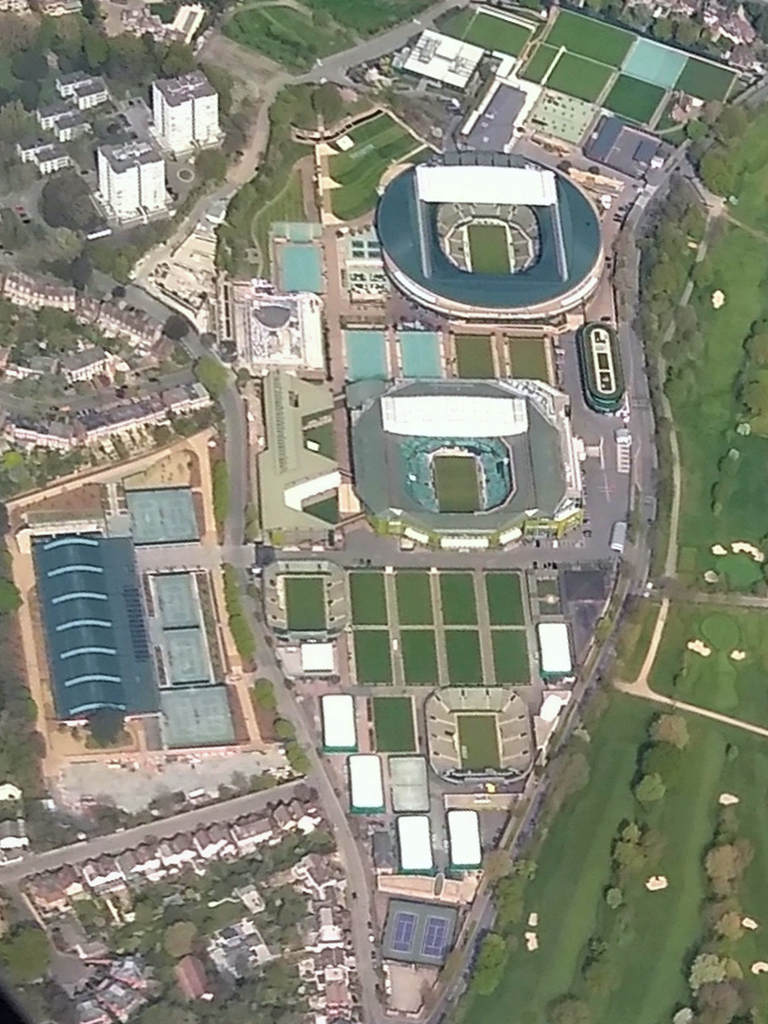
Aerial view of the grounds

Since 2001, the courts used for Wimbledon have been sown with 100% perennial ryegrass. Prior to 2001 a combination of 70% ryegrass and 30% Creeping Red Fescue was used. The change was made to improve durability and strengthen the sward to better withstand the increasing wear of the modern game.

The main show courts, Centre Court and No. 1 Court, are normally used for only two weeks a year, during the Championships, but play can extend into a third week in exceptional circumstances. The remaining 17 courts are regularly used for other events hosted by the club. The show courts were in action for the second time in three months in 2012 as Wimbledon hosted the tennis events of the 2012 Olympic Games. One of the show courts is also used for home ties for the Great Britain teams in the Davis Cup on occasions.

Wimbledon is the only remaining Grand Slam event played on natural grass courts. At one time, all the Majors, except the French Open, were played on grass. The US Open abandoned grass in 1975 for green clay and the Australian Open did so in 1988 for hard courts; the US Open eventually adopted hard courts as well.

From 1877 until 1921, the club's grounds were situated on four acres of meadowland in central Wimbledon between Worple Road and the railway line. In 1908, this venue hosted the tennis events for the 1908 Summer Olympic Games. As the attendance at the Championships grew, it became obvious before the First World War that the 8,000 ground capacity at Worple Road was inadequate, and so the Club started looking for a new site. It eventually settled on an area of land off Church Road, to the north of Wimbledon town centre, and moved to its new home in 1922. At the time the relocation was regarded as something of a financial gamble, costing as it did approximately £140,000. After the Club moved to the current site in Church Road, the old Worple Road ground then became the Wimbledon High School playing field, which it remains today.

The principal court at Church Road, Centre Court, was inaugurated in 1922. The new venue was substantially larger and was needed to meet the ever-growing public demand.

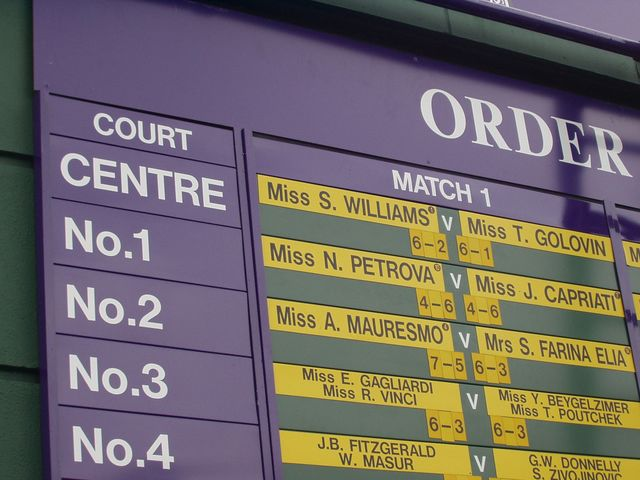
The order of play for all courts is displayed on boards around the grounds.

Due to the possibility of rain during Wimbledon, a retractable roof was installed prior to the 2009 Championship. It is designed to close/open fully in 20 minutes and will be closed primarily to protect play from inclement (and, if necessary, extremely hot) weather during The Championships. Whilst the roof is being opened or closed, play is suspended. The first time the roof was closed during a Wimbledon Championship match was on Monday 29 June 2009, involving Amélie Mauresmo and Dinara Safina. The first full match played and completed under the roof featured Andy Murray and Stan Wawrinka, played on the same date.

The court has a capacity of 14,979. At its south end is the Royal Box, from which members of the Royal Family and other dignitaries watch matches. Centre Court usually hosts the finals and semifinals of the main events, as well as many matches in the earlier rounds involving top-seeded players or local favourites.

The second most important court is No. 1 Court. The court was constructed in 1997 to replace the old No.1 Court, which was adjacent to Centre Court. The old No.1 Court was demolished because its capacity for spectators was too low. The court was said to have had a unique, more intimate atmosphere and was a favourite of many players. Construction of a new retractable roof on the No.1 Court began after the 2017 Championships and was completed in time for the 2019 championships. The capacity of the stadium also rose by 900 to 12,345.

Since 2009, a new No. 2 Court has been used at Wimbledon with a capacity for 4,000 people. To obtain planning permission, the playing surface is around 3.5m below ground level, ensuring that the single-storey structure is only about 3.5m above ground level, and thus not affecting local views. Plans to build on the current site of Court 13 were dismissed due to the high capacity of games played at the 2012 Olympic Games. The old No.2 Court has been renamed as No.3 Court. The old No.2 Court was known as the "Graveyard of Champions" because many highly seeded players were eliminated there during early rounds over the years, including Ilie Năstase, John McEnroe, Boris Becker, Andre Agassi, Pete Sampras, Martina Hingis, Venus Williams, Serena Williams and Maria Sharapova. The court has a capacity of 2,192 + 770 standing. In 2011 a new No.3 Court and a new Court 4 were unveiled on the sites of the old No.2 and 3 courts.

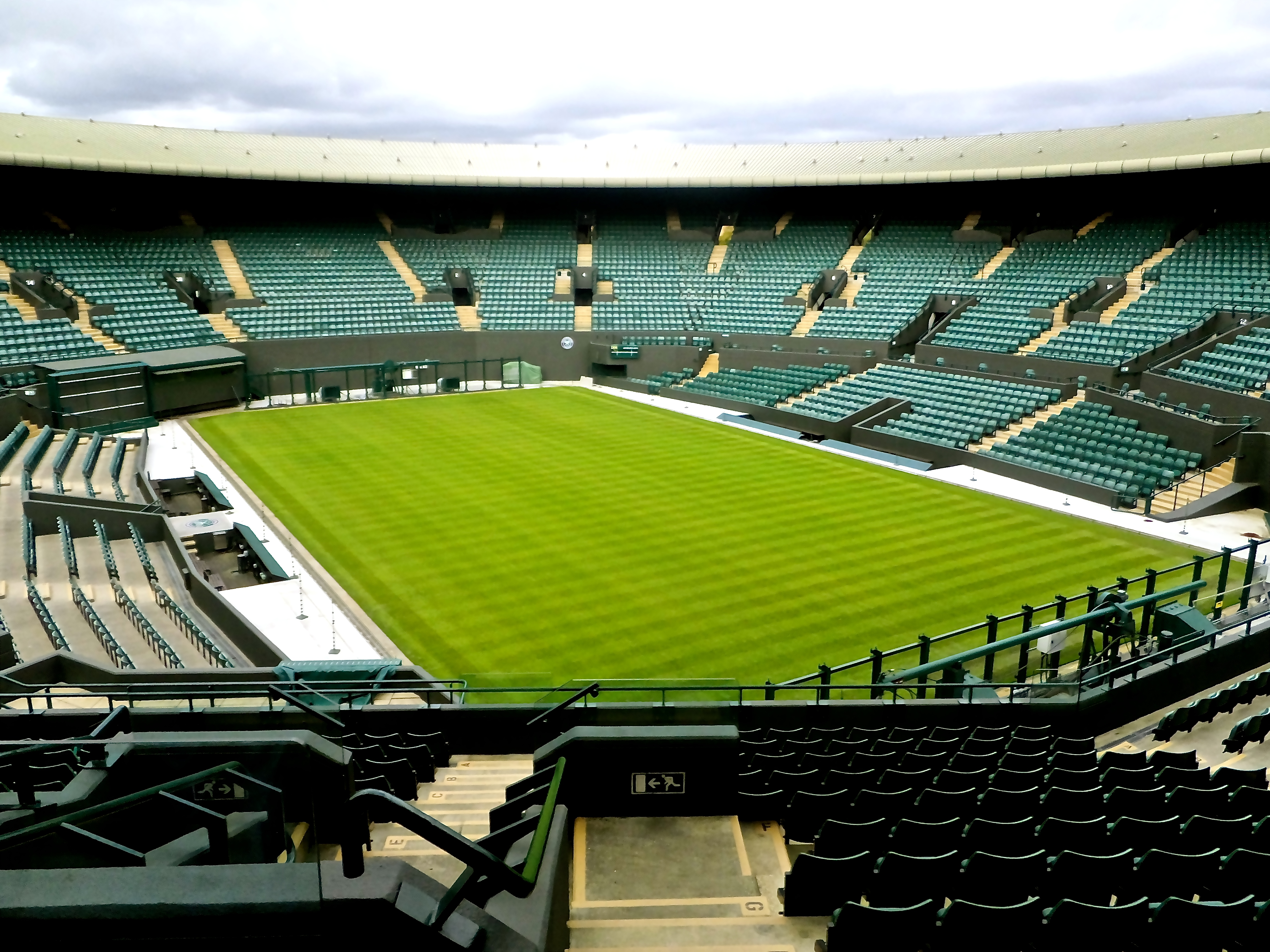
View from seats of Wimbledon Court No. 1

Because of the summer climate in southern England, Wimbledon employs 'Court Attendants' each year, who work to maintain court conditions. Their principal responsibility is to ensure that the courts are quickly covered when it begins to rain, so that play can resume as quickly as possible once the referees decide to uncover the courts. The outer court attendants are mainly university students working to make summer money. Centre Court is covered by full-time groundstaff, however.

At the northern end of the grounds is a giant television screen on which important matches are broadcast to fans inside the grounds without tickets to the relevant court. Fans watch from a gently inclined area of grass officially known as the Aorangi Terrace. When British players do well at Wimbledon, this area attracts fans for them, and is often renamed after them by the press: Greg Rusedski's followers convened at "Rusedski Ridge", and Tim Henman has had the hill nicknamed Henman Hill. As both of them have now retired and Andy Murray is the most successful current British player, the hill is occasionally referred to as "Murray Mound" or "Murrayfield", as a reference to his Scottish heritage and the Scottish rugby ground of the same name, but this has largely failed to catch on – the area is still often referred to as Henman Hill. None of these nicknames are the official name.

=== 1913 suffragette terror attack ===
An attempt was made to destroy the grounds in 1913, during the suffragette bombing and arson campaign. The suffragettes, as part of their campaign for women's votes before the First World War, had begun carrying out politically motivated arson and bombings across the country. On the night of 27 February 1913, a suffragette woman "between the ages of 30–35" was arrested within the grounds, after being spotted by a groundsman climbing over a hedge at around midnight. She was found to have with her some paraffin and wood shavings, for the purpose of setting fires in the grounds. The woman refused to give her name or any information to the police and was later sentenced to two months' imprisonment.

=== Bank of England Sports Centre ===
The qualifying matches, prior to the main draw, take place at the Bank of England Sports Ground, in Roehampton, 3.6 miles (5.8 km) from the All England Club.

== Traditions ==
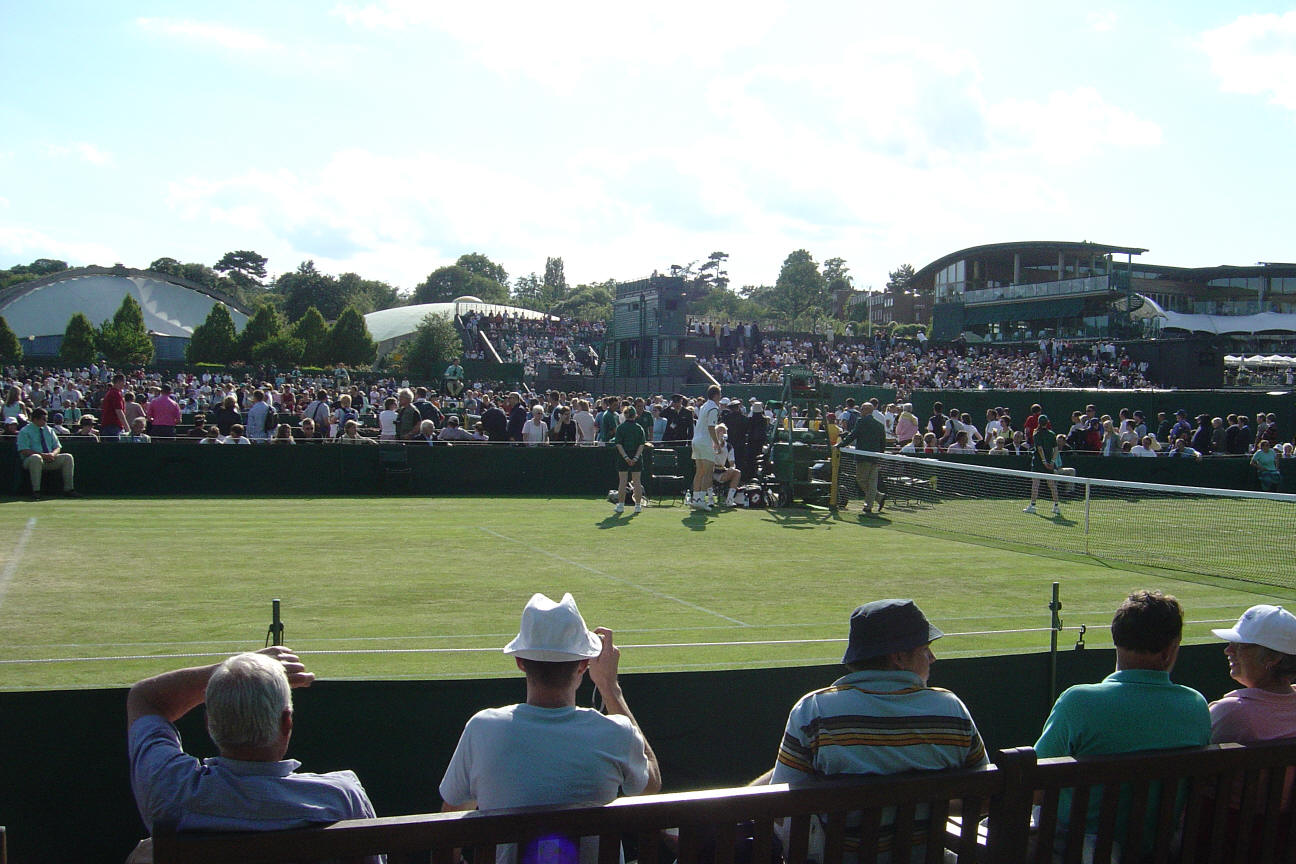
Court 10. On the outside courts there is no reserved seating.

Social commentator Ellis Cashmore describes Wimbledon as having "a David Niven-ish propriety", in trying to conform to the standards of behaviour regarded as common in the 1950s. Writer Peter York sees the event as representing a particular white, upper middle class, affluent type of Britishness, describing the area of Wimbledon as "a southern, well off, late-Victorian suburb with a particular social character". Cashmore has criticised the event for being "remote and insulated" from the changing multicultural character of modern Britain, describing it as "nobody's idea of all-things-British".

=== Ball boys and ball girls ===
In the championship games, ball boys and girls, known as BBGs, have a brief that a good BBG "should not be seen. They should blend into the background and get on with their jobs quietly."

From 1947 ball boys were recruited from Goldings, the only Barnardos school to provide them. Prior to this, from the 1920s onwards, the ball boys came from The Shaftesbury Children's Home.

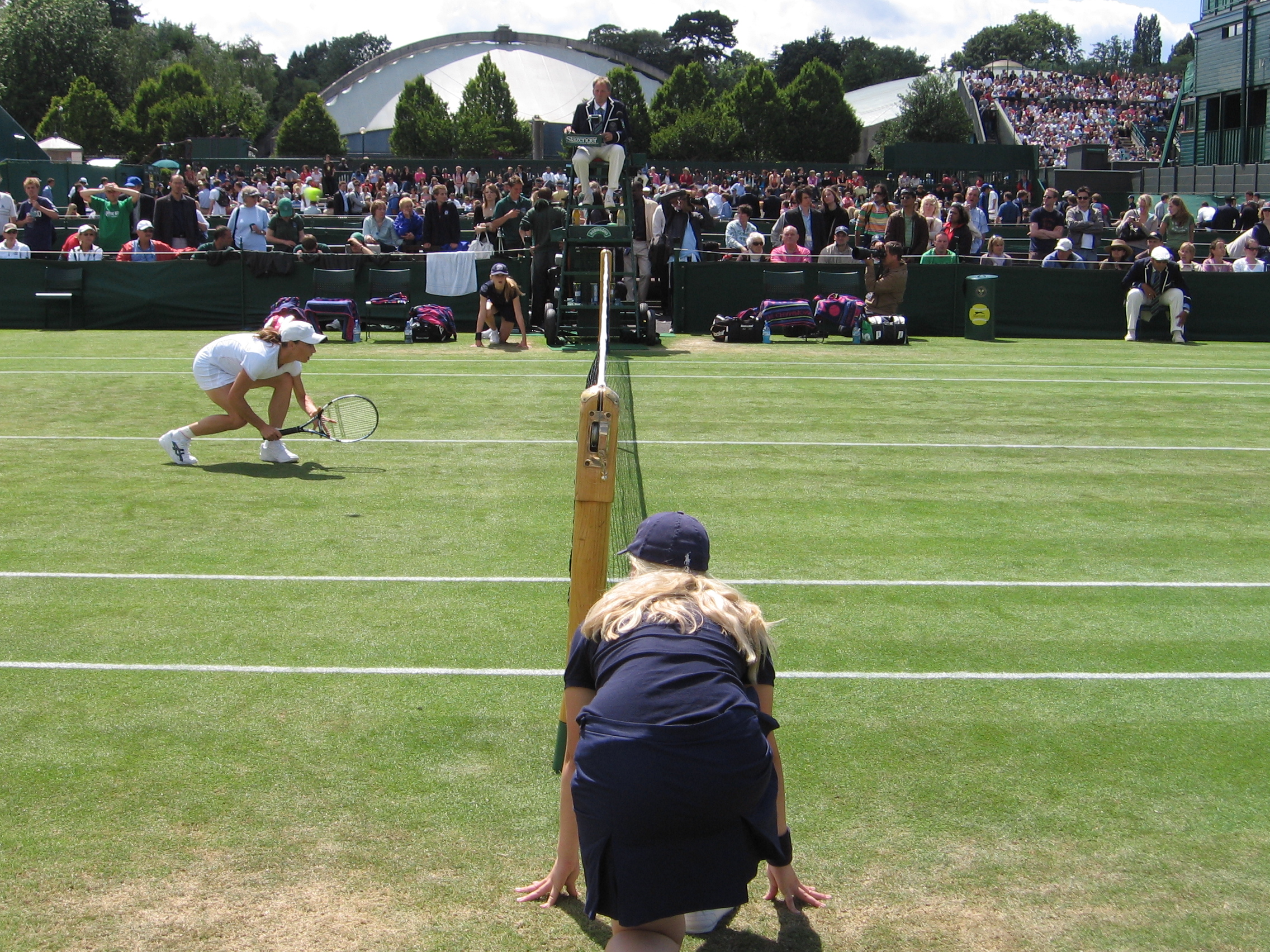
Wimbledon ball girl at the net, in the 2007 edition

Since 1969, BBGs have been drawn from local schools. Traditionally, Wandsworth Boys School in Sutherland Grove, Southfields and Mayfield Girls School on West Hill in Wandsworth (only Southfields remains extant), were the schools of choice for selection of BBGs. This was possibly owing to their proximity to the club. Since 2008 they have been drawn from schools in the London boroughs of Merton, Sutton, Kingston, and Wandsworth, as well as from Surrey. BBGs have an average age of 15, being drawn from the school years nine and ten. They serve for one, or if re-selected, for up to five tournaments, up to year thirteen.

Starting in 2005, BBGs work in teams of six, two at the net, four at the corners, and teams rotate one hour on court, one hour off, (two hours depending on the court) for the day's play. Teams are not told which court they will be working on the day, to ensure the same standards across all courts. With the expansion of the number of courts, and lengthening the tennis day, as of 2008, the number of BBGs required is around 250. Starting on the second Wednesday, the number of BBGs is reduced due to the decrease in the number of matches per day, leaving around 80 on the final Sunday. Each BBG receives a certificate, a can of used balls, a group photograph and a programme when leaving. BBG service is paid, with a total of £160-£250 being paid to each ball boy or girl after the 13-day period, depending on the number of days served, around £17 per day. Every BBG keeps their kit. BBG places are split 50:50 between boys and girls, with girls having been included since 1977, appearing on centre court since 1985.

Prospective BBGs are first nominated by their school representative, to be considered for selection. To be selected, a candidate must pass written tests on the rules of tennis, and pass fitness, mobility and other suitability tests, against initial preliminary instruction material. Successful candidates then commence a training phase, starting in February, in which the final BBGs are chosen through continual assessment. As of 2008, this training intake was 300. The training includes weekly sessions of physical, procedural and theoretical instruction, to ensure that the BBGs are fast, alert, self-confident and adaptable to situations. As of 2011, early training occurs at the Wimbledon All England Lawn Tennis Club Community Centre, before moving to the Wimbledon All England Lawn Tennis Club Covered Courts, to the side of the Grounds, and then to outside courts (8, 9, 10) the week before the Championships to ensure that BBGs gain a feel of the grass court.

=== Umpires ===
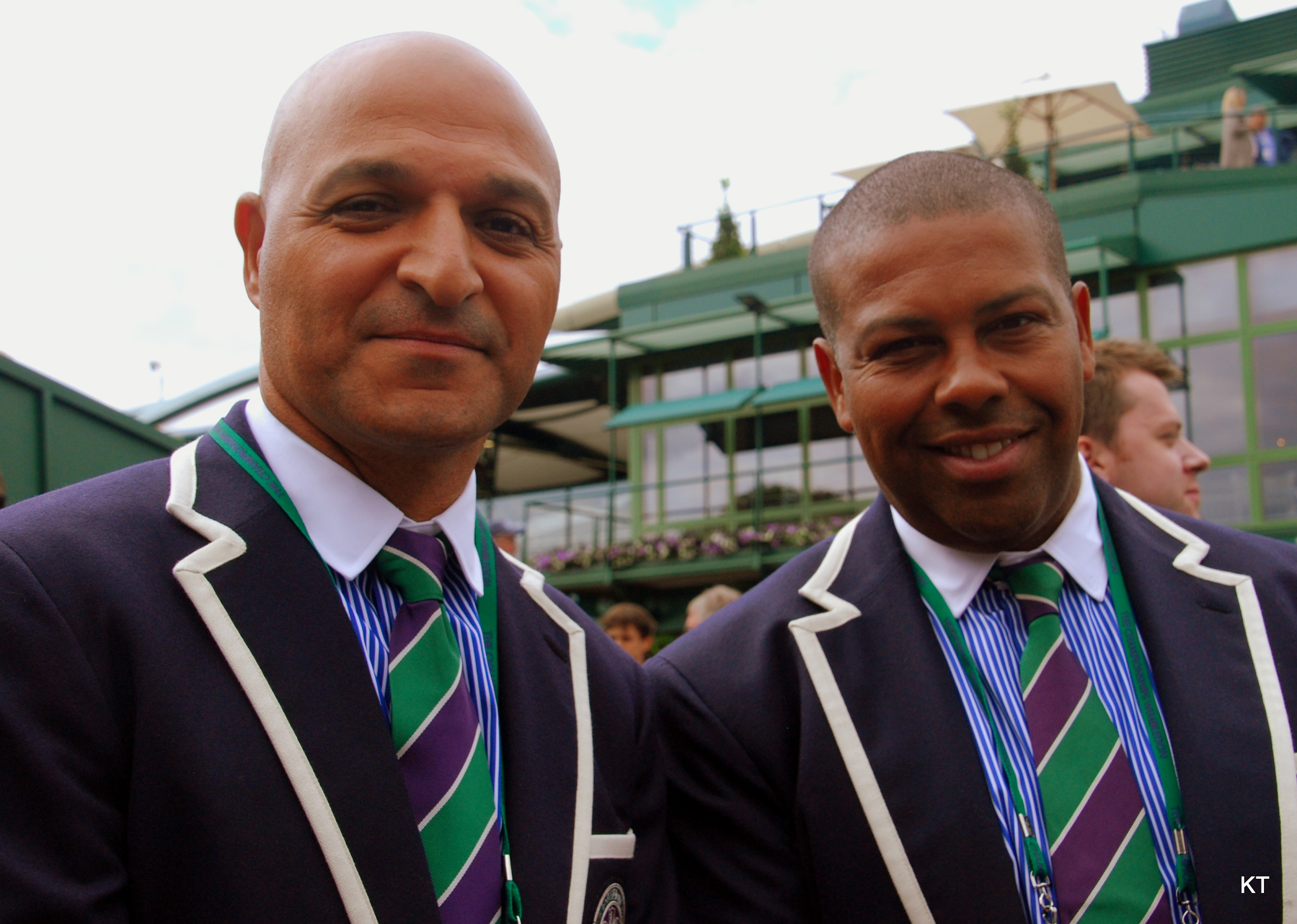
Umpires Magdi Somat and Carlos Bernardes between Wimbledon matches in 2013

At The Championships at Wimbledon, forty-two chair umpires are assigned each day and usually work two matches a day. They use tablet computers to score each match and these scores are displayed on the scoreboards and on wimbledon.com. Line umpires worked in teams of nine or seven. Teams of nine umpires worked the Centre Court and Court numbers 1, 2, 3, 12, and 18 with the remaining teams of seven working the other courts. These teams rotated, working sixty minutes on the court and then sixty minutes off.

In 2007 a new technology called Hawk-Eye was introduced. This technology showed whether the ball bounced in bounds or out. Wimbledon started using this technology but continued to use line umpires as well. However the players were only allowed to ask to see this 3 times during one set.

Line umpires and the ability to challenge calls made during a match were axed, starting from the 2025 Championships, due to the professional tennis tours adopting the Hawk-Eye Live technology from the 2025 season for any tournament capable of supporting it, bringing an end to the 147 years of traditional scenes of line umpires walking to and from the courts during matches. The only umpire on the court will now be the chair umpire, although the new role of match assistants will be created to escort players to the bathroom or take their racquets to the stringer.

=== Colours and uniforms ===
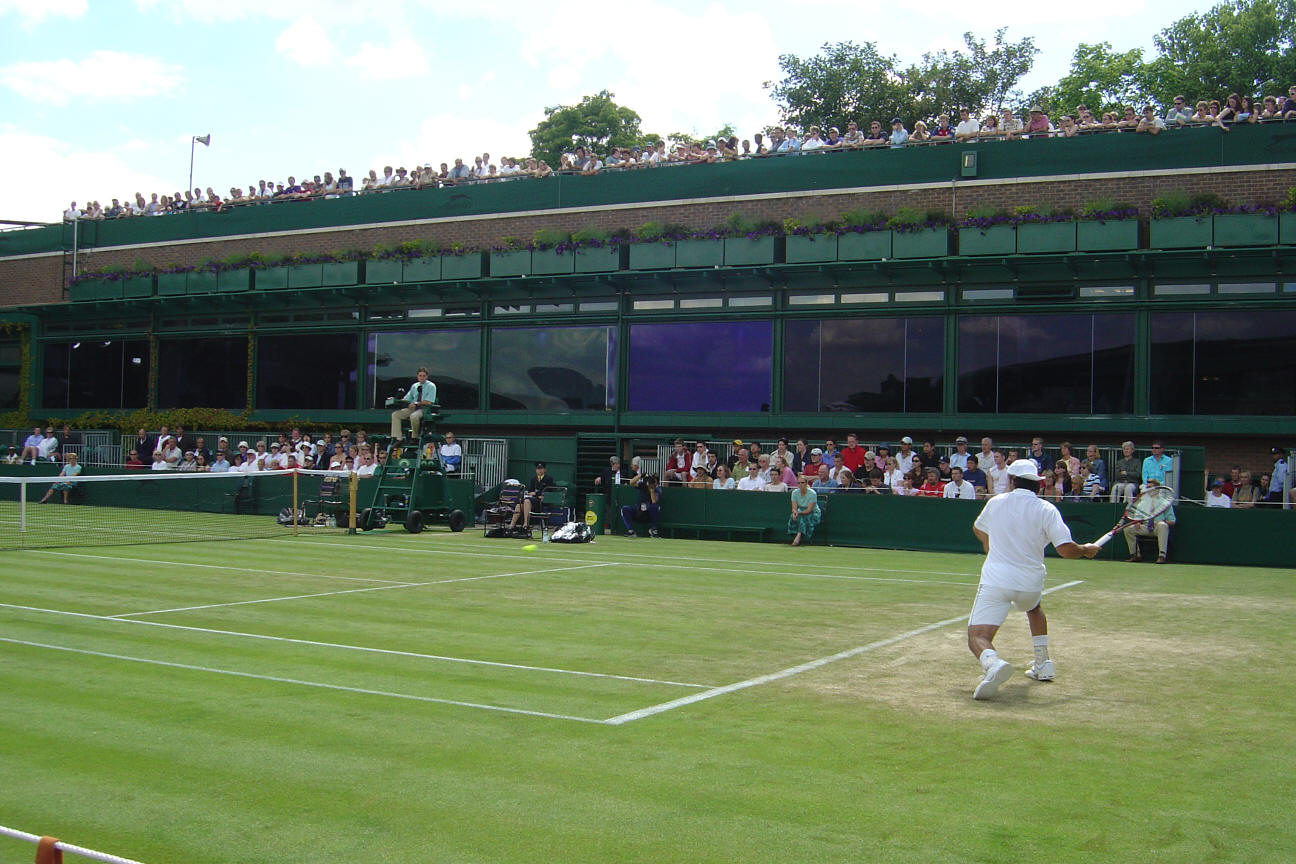
Sébastien Grosjean takes a shot on Court 18 during the 2004 Championships.

Dark green and purple are the traditional Wimbledon colours. However, all tennis players participating in the tournament are required to wear all-white or at least almost all-white clothing, a long-time tradition at Wimbledon. (Note: Guidelines regarding the prominently-white clothing rule include no solid mass of colouring; coloured trims not to exceed 1 cm; shirt or dress backs to be totally white; all other items of clothing, including shorts, shirts, caps, headbands, socks, and shoe uppers to be predominantly white. In 2023 rules first allowed all female players, included but not limited to in the girls' singles junior event, to wear non-white underwear; the new rule allows "solid, mid/dark-coloured undershorts, provided they are no longer than their shorts or skirt".) This rule was put in place in 1963, when the tournament's first dress code was enforced. Wearing white clothing with some colour accents is also acceptable, provided the colour scheme is not that of an identifiable commercial brand logo (the outfitter's brand logo being the sole exception). Controversy followed Martina Navratilova's wearing branding for "Kim" cigarettes in 1982. In 2023 rules first allowed all female players, included but not limited to in the girls' singles junior event, to wear non-white underwear; the new rule allows "solid, mid/dark-coloured undershorts, provided they are no longer than their shorts or skirt". Green clothing was worn by the chair umpire, linesmen, ball boys and ball girls until the 2005 Championships; however, beginning with the 2006 Championships, officials, ball boys and ball girls were dressed in new navy blue- and cream-coloured uniforms from American designer Ralph Lauren.

=== Referring to players ===
By tradition, the "Men's" and "Women's" competitions are referred to as "Gentlemen's" and "Ladies'" competitions at Wimbledon. The junior competitions are referred to as the "Boys'" and "Girls'" competitions.

Prior to 2009, female players were referred to by the title "Miss" or "Mrs" on scoreboards. On the Wimbledon's Champions Board, married female players were referred to by their husband's name up until 2019. For the first time during the 2009 tournament, players were referred to on scoreboards by both their first and last names.

The title "Mr" is not used for male players who are professionals on scoreboards but is retained for amateurs, although chair umpires refer to players as "Mr" when they use the replay challenge. The chair umpire will say "Mr <surname> is challenging the call..." and "Mr. <surname> has X challenges remaining." Up until 2018, the chair umpire said "Miss"/"Mrs" <surname> when announcing the score of the Ladies' matches. However, the chair umpire no longer calls "Miss"/"Mrs" <surname> when announcing the score, since 2019. As of the 2022 edition of the tournament, the use of Mr, Miss and Mrs was eliminated: players are now referred to by their names, as written on the scoreboard by the umpire at all points in a match.

If a match is being played with two competitors of the same surname (e.g. Venus and Serena Williams, Bob and Mike Bryan), the chair umpire will specify to whom they are referring by stating the player's first name and surname during announcements (e.g. "Game, Venus Williams", "Advantage, Mike Bryan").

=== Royal family ===
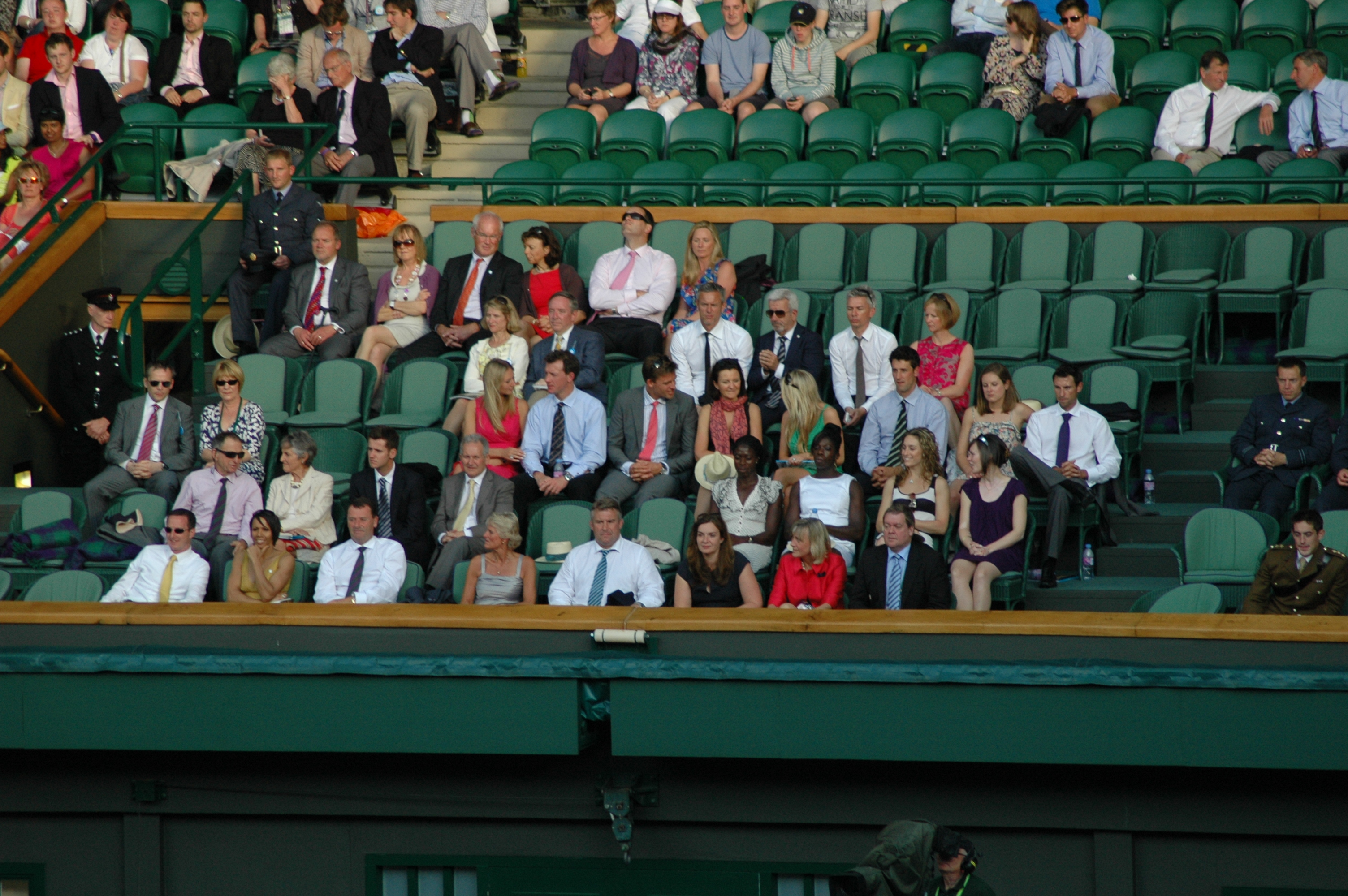
The Royal Gallery at Centre Court, Wimbledon

Previously, players bowed or curtsied to members of the royal family seated in the Royal Box upon entering or leaving Centre Court. However, in 2003, All England Club president Prince Edward, Duke of Kent decided to discontinue the tradition. Now, players are required to bow or curtsy only if the Prince of Wales or the King is present, as was in practice during the 2010 Championships when Elizabeth II was in attendance at Wimbledon on 24 June. On 27 June 2012, Roger Federer said in his post-match interview that he and his opponent had been asked to bow towards the Royal Box as Prince Charles and his wife were present, saying that it was not a problem for him.

=== Services stewards ===
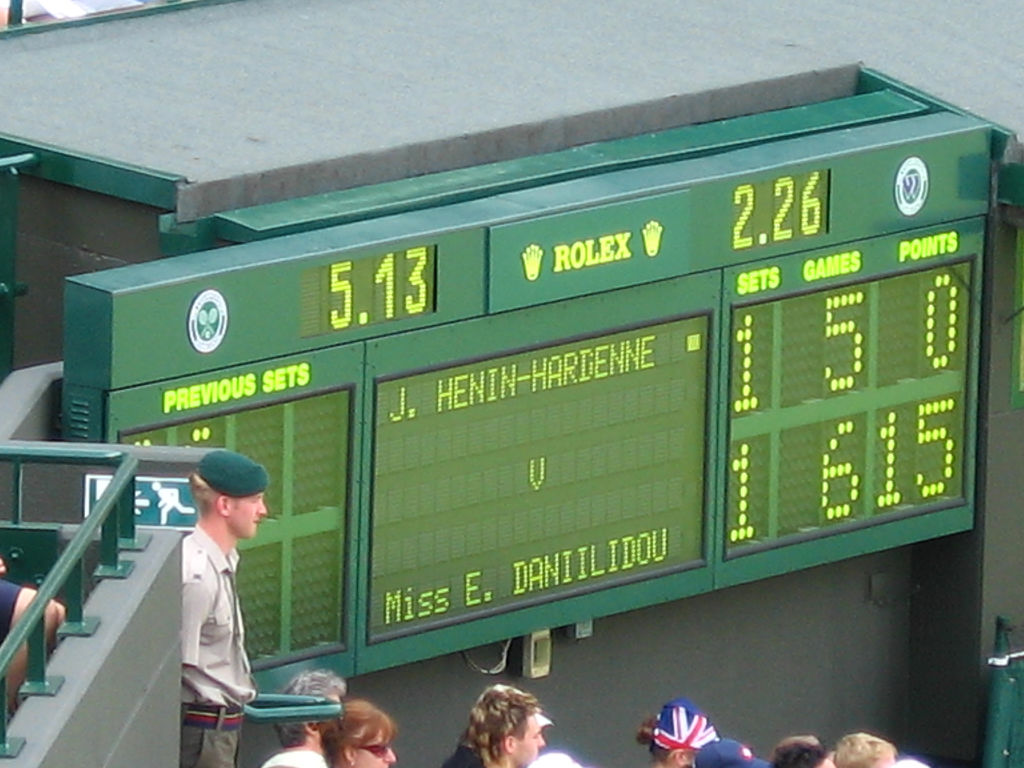
A Royal Marines Commando as a services steward in 2005

Prior to the Second World War, members of the Brigade of Guards and retired members of the Royal Artillery performed the role of stewards. In 1946 the AELTC offered employment to wartime servicemen returning to civilian life during their demobilisation leave. Initially, this scheme extended only to the Royal Navy, followed by the British Army in 1947 and the Royal Air Force in 1949. In 1965 London Fire Brigade members joined the ranks of stewards. The service stewards, wearing uniform, are present in Centre Court and No.'s 1, 2, 3, 12 and 18 courts. In 2015, 595 Service and London Fire Brigade stewards attended. Only enlisted members of the Armed Forces may apply for the role, which must be taken as leave, and half of each year's recruits must have stewarded at Wimbledon before. The AELTC pays a subsistence allowance to servicemen and women working as stewards to defray their accommodation costs for the period of the Championships. The Service Stewards are not to be confused with the 185 Honorary Stewards.

=== Tickets ===
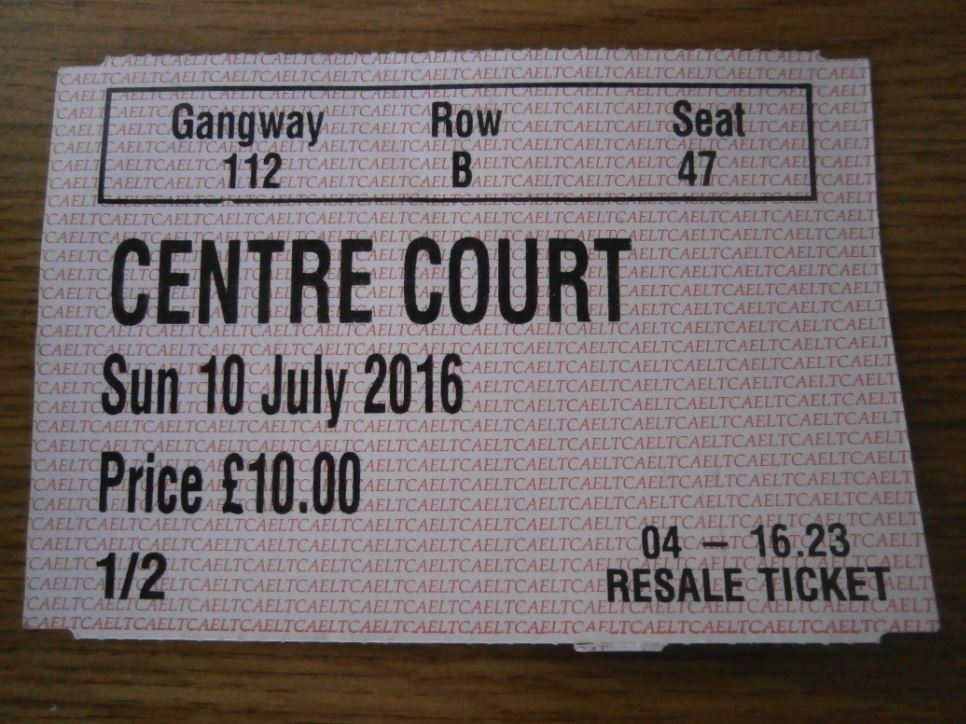
Wimbledon operates a ticket resale system where returned Show Court tickets can be purchased. All proceeds go to charity.

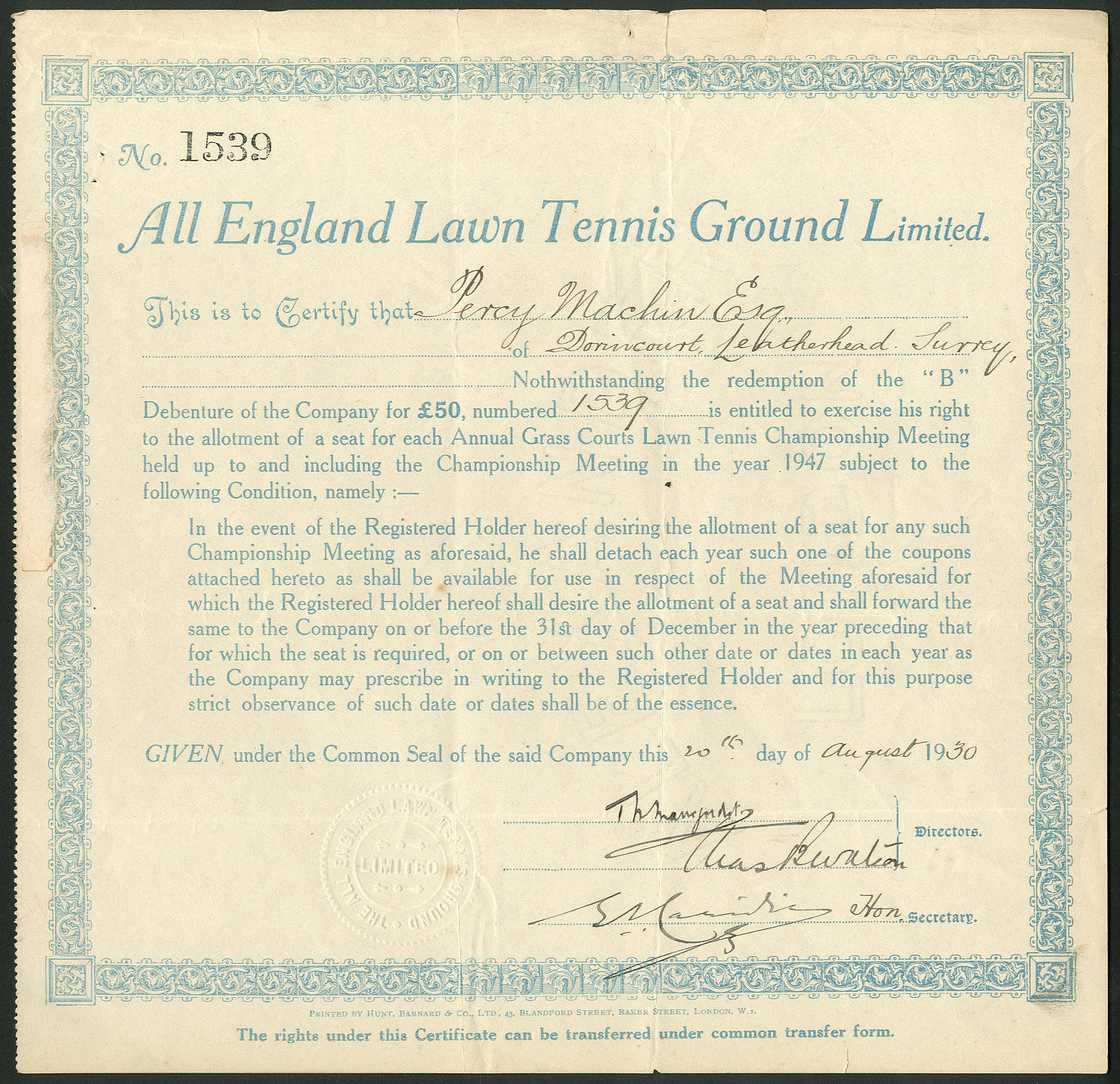
Debenture of the All England Lawn Tennis Ground Ltd., issued 20th August 1930

The majority of centre and show court tickets sold to the general public have since 1924 been made available by a public ballot that the All England Lawn Tennis and Croquet Club holds at the start of the year. The ballot has always been substantially oversubscribed. Successful applicants are selected at random by a computer. The most recent figures from 2011 suggested there were four applicants to every ballot ticket. Applications must be posted to arrive at the AELTC by the last day of December in the year prior to the tournament. Seats and days are allocated randomly and ballot tickets are not transferable.

The All England Club, through its subsidiary The All England Lawn Tennis Ground plc, issues debentures to tennis fans every five years to raise funds for capital expenditure. Fans who invest thus in the club receive a pair of tickets for every day of the Wimbledon Championships for the five years the investment lasts. Only debenture holders are permitted to sell on their tickets to third parties and demand for debentures has increased in recent years, to such an extent that they are even traded on the London Stock Exchange.

Wimbledon and the French Open are the only Grand Slam tournaments where fans without tickets for play can queue up and still get seats on the three show courts on the day of the match. Sequentially numbered queue cards were introduced in 2003. From 2008, there is a single queue, allotted about 500 seats for each court. When they join the queue, fans are handed queue cards. Anyone who then wishes to leave the queue temporarily, even if in possession of a queue card, must agree their position with the others nearby in the queue or a steward.

To get access to the show courts, fans normally have to queue overnight. This is done by fans from all over the world and, although considered vagrancy, is part of the Wimbledon experience in itself. The All-England Club allows overnight queuing and provides toilet and water facilities for campers. Early in the morning when the line moves towards the Grounds, stewards walk along the line and hand out wristbands that are colour-coded to the specific court. The wrist band (and payment) is exchanged at the ticket office for the ticket when the grounds open. General admission to the grounds gives access to the outer courts and is possible without queuing overnight. Tickets returned by people leaving early go on sale at 2:30 pm and the money goes to charity. Queuing for the show courts ends after the quarter finals have been completed.

At 2.40pm on Day Seven (Monday 28 June) of the 2010 Championships, the one-millionth numbered Wimbledon queue card was handed out to Rose Stanley from South Africa.

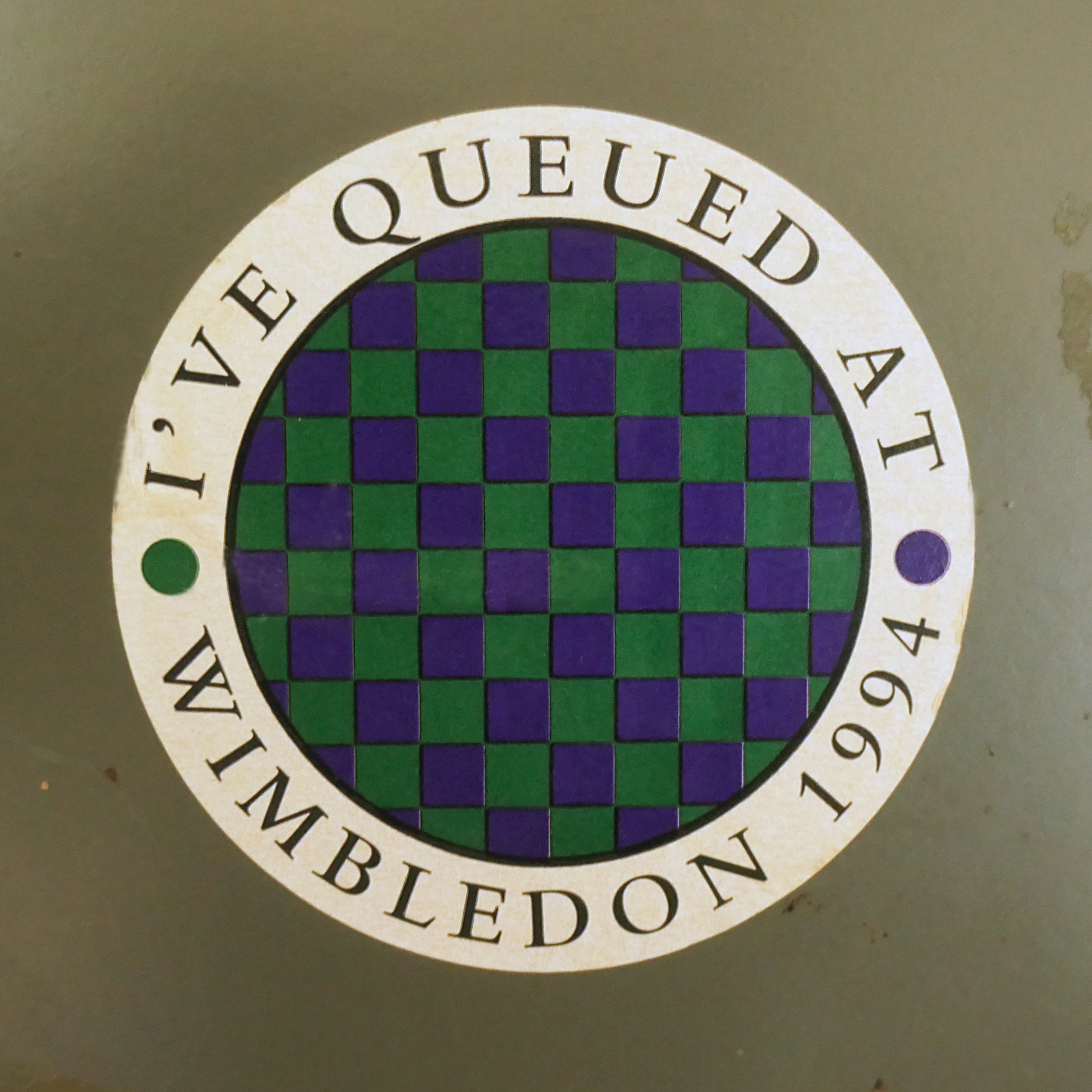
A 1994 “I’ve queued at Wimbledon” sticker

=== Sponsorship ===
Unlike other tournaments, advertising from major brands is minimal and low key, from suppliers such as IBM, Rolex and Slazenger. Wimbledon is notable for the longest running sponsorship in sports history due to its association with Slazenger who have supplied all tennis balls for the tournament since 1902. Between 1935 and 2021, Wimbledon had a sponsorship deal with Robinsons fruit squash – one of the longest sponsorships in sport.

Starting in 2024, Emirates started sponsoring Wimbledon for the first time alongside the Australian Open, French Open and the US Open tennis championships.

=== Strawberries and cream ===
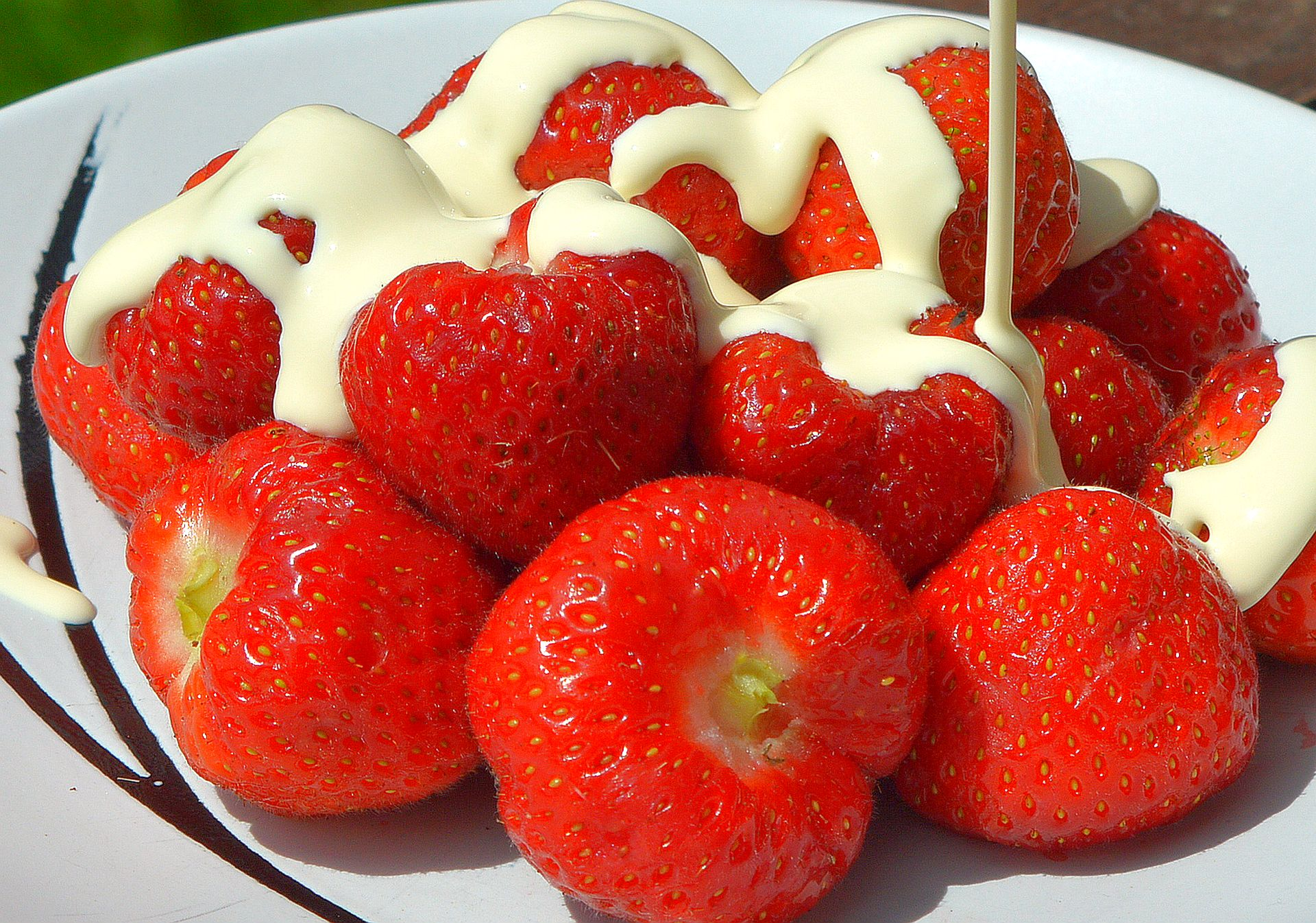
Strawberries and cream at Wimbledon

Strawberries and cream are traditionally eaten by spectators at Wimbledon and have become culturally synonymous with the tournament. The origin of this tradition has been said to derive from a visit King Henry VIII paid to his Lord Chancellor, Cardinal Thomas Wolsey, whose home was at Hampton Court, about six miles from Wimbledon, when the chancellor's cook is rumoured to have served wild strawberries and cream as a dessert. Since the King ate it, the dessert gained popularity. In 2017, fans consumed 34,000 kg (33 imperial tons) of British strawberries and 10,000 litres (2,200 imperial gallons) of cream. In 2019, 191,930 portions of strawberries and cream were served at The Championships at Wimbledon.

=== The Wimbledon champions' dinner and ball ===
The Wimbledon Champions' Dinner, formerly known as the Champions' Ball, is an event organised after the end of each edition of the Wimbledon Championships and it consists of a dinner and a dance between the Men's and Women's singles winners. A picture of them with their respective trophies is also taken at this event.

In later years, the dance tradition became not mandatory and sporadically returned in some editions of the tournament, notably, in 2015, Novak Djokovic and Serena Williams danced together to the Bee Gees' "Night Fever" at the dinner, evoking the spirit of the original Champions' Ball. In 2018, Djokovic invited Angelique Kerber to dance at the dinner.

In 2024, the champions Carlos Alcaraz and Barbora Krejčíková also danced together.

In 1977, the dinner was rescheduled to the middle Saturday of the tournament, which resulted in the end of the formal champions' dance tradition.

In recent years, the Champions' Dinner has been hosted at The Lawn, a hospitality venue located on the grounds of The Wimbledon Club, across from the All England Lawn Tennis and Croquet Club. It gathers players, their families, and distinguished guests to celebrate the tournament's champions.

In 2021, the Champions' Dinner was canceled due to COVID-19 restrictions, marking a rare interruption in the tradition.

=== Balls ===
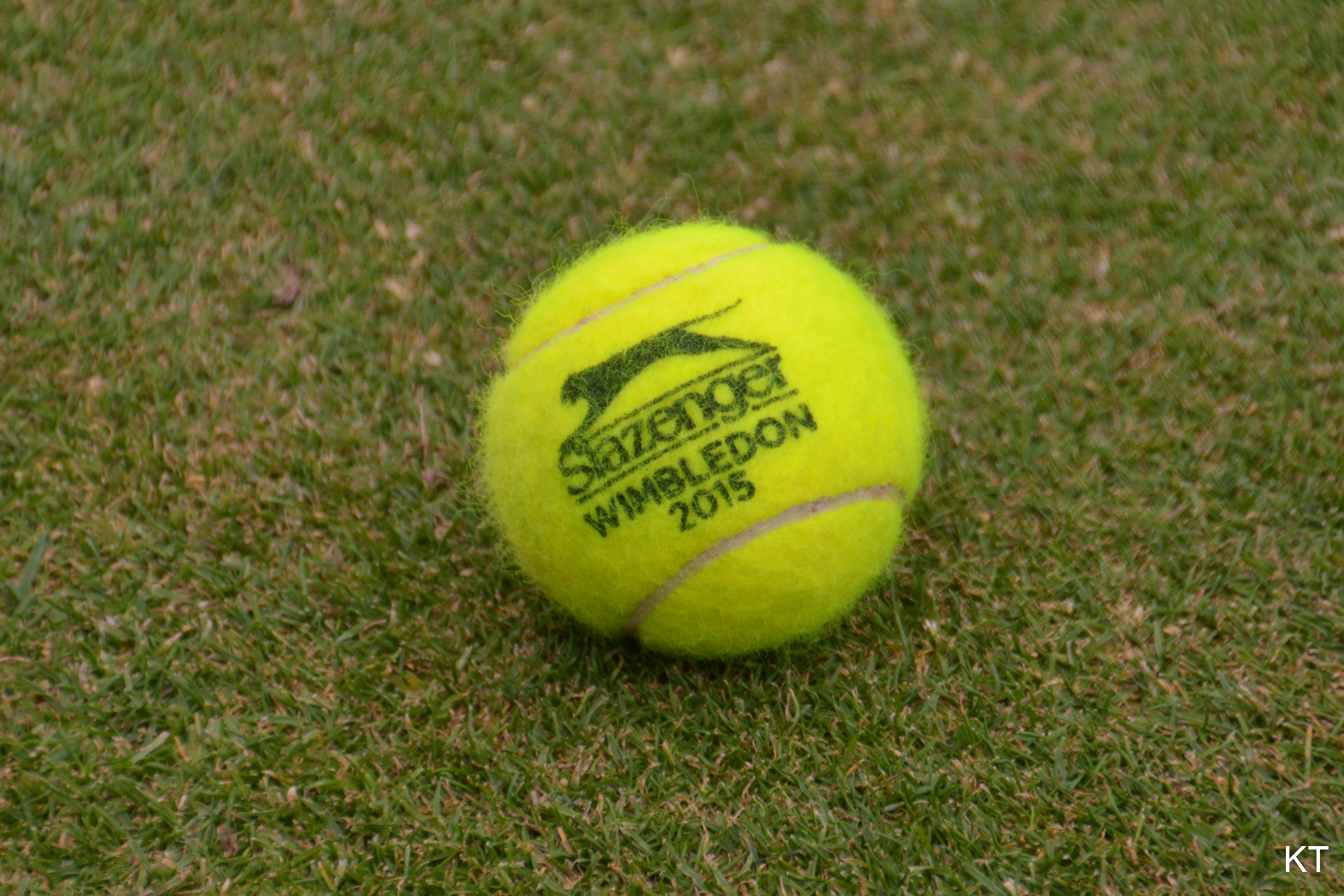
A 2015 Wimbledon Championships tennis ball manufactured by Slazenger

Since 1902, the Wimbledon Championships have used tennis balls manufactured by Slazenger and in already several decades now made in Mariveles, Bataan, Philippines. The company has been the official supplier for the tournament ever since, making this the longest-running sponsorship deal in sport.

== Media coverage and attendance ==
=== Radio Wimbledon ===
Until 2011, when its contract ended, Radio Wimbledon could be heard within a five-mile radius on 87.7 FM, and also online. It operated under a restricted service licence. Presenters included Sam Lloyd and Ali Barton. Typically, they worked alternate four-hour shifts until the end of the last match of the day. Reporters and commentators included Gigi Salmon, Nick Lestor, Rupert Bell, Nigel Bidmead, Guy Swindells, Lucie Ahl, Nadine Towell and Helen Whitaker. Often, they reported from the "Crow's Nest", an elevated building housing the Court 3 and 4 scoreboards which affords views of most of the outside courts. Regular guests included Sue Mappin. In later years, Radio Wimbledon acquired a second low-power FM frequency (within the grounds only) of 96.3 FM for uninterrupted Centre Court commentary, and, from 2006, a third for coverage from No. 1 Court on 97.8 FM. Hourly news bulletins and travel (using RDS) were also broadcast.

Radio Wimbledon's theme tune is called "Purple and Green" and has been used since 1996, when it was composed by British composer Tony Cox.

=== Television coverage ===
Beginning with the 2018 tournament, an in-house operation known as Wimbledon Broadcasting Services (WBS) has served as the official host broadcaster of the tournament, replacing BBC Sport. Despite this, commentary teams for the show courts are often provided by the BBC, including Andrew Cotter, Andrew Castle, and much of the production talent involved in producing the world feed for WBS are provided from the BBC.

==== United Kingdom ====
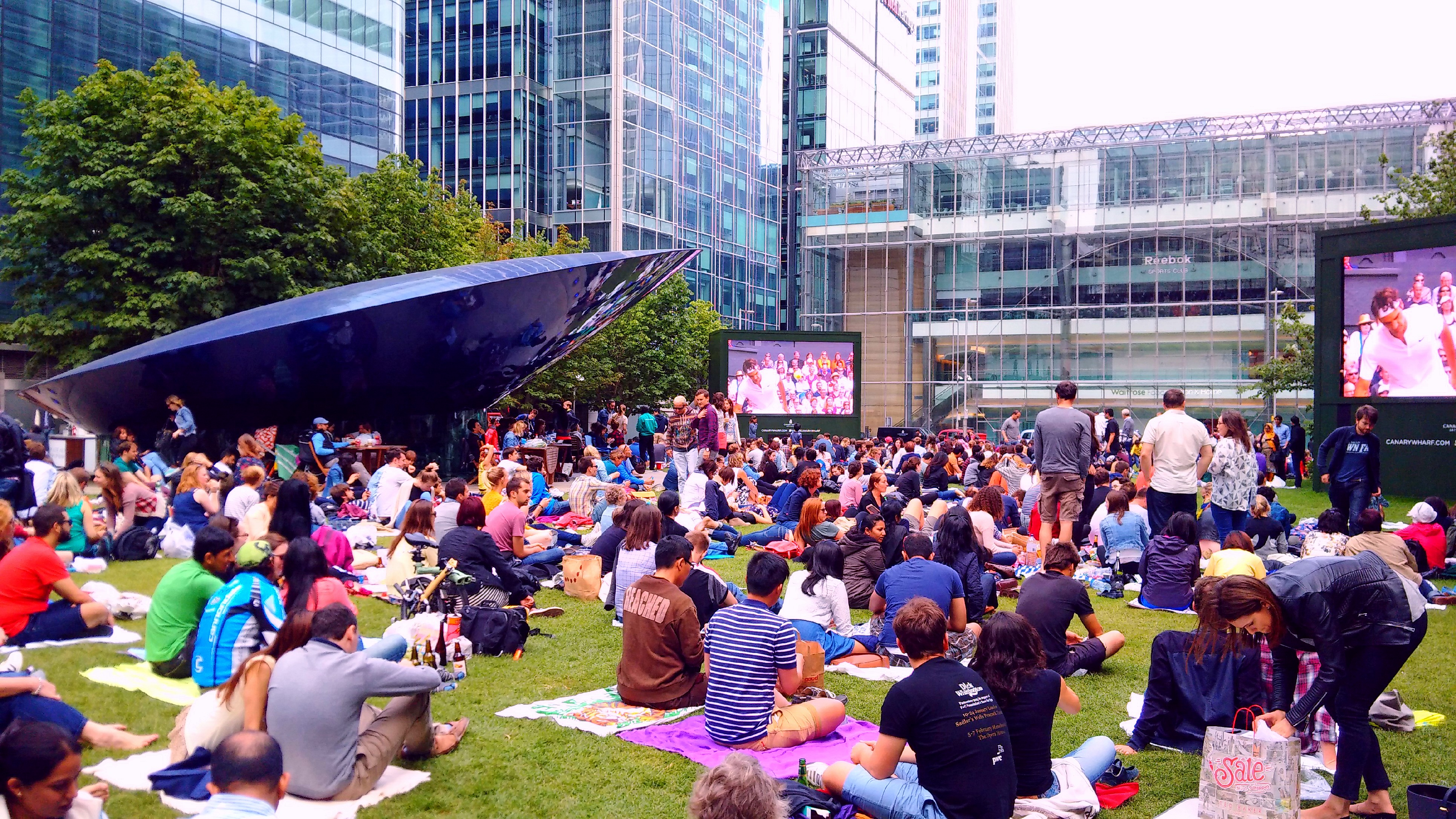
People watching the Championships' broadcast in Canary Wharf

Since 1937 the BBC has broadcast the tournament on television in the United Kingdom. (Note: During the first year of television coverage in 1937 the BBC used two cameras at the Centre Court to transmit matches for a maximum of half an hour a day. The first match to be broadcast was between Bunny Austin and George Lyttleton-Rogers.) Between 1956 and 1968, the Championships were also covered by ITV, but since 1969 the BBC has had a monopoly. The matches covered are primarily split between its two main terrestrial channels, BBC One and BBC Two, and their Red Button service. This can result in live matches being moved across all 3 channels. The BBC holds the broadcast rights for Wimbledon until 2027. During the days of British Satellite Broadcasting, its sports channel carried extra coverage of Wimbledon for subscribers. One of the most notable British commentators was Dan Maskell, who was known as the BBC's "voice of tennis" until his retirement in 1991. John Barrett succeeded him in that role until he retired in 2006. Current commentators working for the BBC at Wimbledon include British ex-players Andrew Castle, John Lloyd, Tim Henman, Greg Rusedski, Samantha Smith and Mark Petchey; tennis legends such as John McEnroe, Tracy Austin, Boris Becker and Lindsay Davenport; and general sports commentators including David Mercer, Barry Davies, Andrew Cotter and Nick Mullins. The coverage is presented by Clare Balding. Previous BBC presenters include Des Lynam, David Vine, John Inverdale, Sue Barker and Harry Carpenter.

The Wimbledon Finals are obliged to be shown live and in full on terrestrial television (BBC, ITV, Channel 4, or Channel 5) by government mandate. Highlights of the rest of the tournament must be provided by terrestrial stations; live coverage (excepting the finals) may be sought by satellite or cable TV.

The BBC was forced to apologise after many viewers complained about "over-talking" by its commentary team during the TV coverage of the event in 2011. It said in a statement that views on commentary were subjective but that they "do appreciate that over-talking can irritate our audience". The BBC added that it hoped it had achieved "the right balance" across its coverage and was "of course sorry if on occasion you have not been satisfied". Tim Henman and John McEnroe were among the ex-players commentating.

Wimbledon was also involved in a piece of television history, when on 1 July 1967 the first official colour television broadcast took place in the UK. Four hours live coverage of the 1967 Championships was shown on BBC Two, which was the first television channel in Europe to regularly broadcast in colour. Footage of that historic match no longer survives, however, the Gentlemen's Final of that year is still held in the BBC archives because it was the first Gentlemen's Final transmitted in colour. The tennis balls used were traditionally white, but were switched to yellow in 1986 to make them stand out for colour television. Since 2007, Wimbledon matches have been transmitted in high-definition, originally on the BBC's free-to-air channel BBC HD, with continual live coverage during the tournament of Centre Court and Court No. 1 as well as an evening highlights show Today at Wimbledon. Coverage is now shown on BBC One and Two's HD feeds. Beginning 2018, all centre court matches are televised in 4K ultra-high-definition.

The BBC's opening theme music for Wimbledon since 1972 was composed by Keith Mansfield and is titled "Light and Tuneful". A piece titled "A Sporting Occasion" is the traditional closing theme. The final notes of this theme are regularly used to end BBC One and BBC Two Wimbledon transmissions. For the end of broadcast at the conclusion of the tournament a montage set to popular music is traditionally used instead. Mansfield also composed the piece "World Champion", used by NBC during intervals (change-overs, set breaks, etc.) and at the close of broadcasts throughout the tournament.

==== Ireland ====
In Ireland, RTÉ broadcast the tournament during the 1980s and 1990s on their second channel RTÉ Two, they also provided highlights of the games in the evening. The commentary provided was given by Matt Doyle a former Irish-American professional tennis player and Jim Sherwin a former RTÉ newsreader. Caroline Murphy was the presenter of the programme. RTÉ made the decision in 1998 to discontinue broadcasting the tournament due to falling viewing figures and the large number of viewers watching on the BBC. From 2005 until 2014 TG4 Ireland's Irish-language broadcaster provided coverage of the tournament. Live coverage was provided in the Irish language while they broadcast highlights in English at night.

In 2015 Wimbledon moved to pay TV broadcaster Setanta Sports under a 3-year agreement. Its successor, Eir Sport, took over broadcasting rights in Ireland until its demise in 2021.

==== Americas ====
In the United States, ABC began showing taped highlights of the Wimbledon Gentlemen's Singles Final in the 1960s on its Wide World of Sports series. NBC began a 43-year run of covering Wimbledon in 1969, with same-day taped (and often edited) coverage of the Gentlemen's Singles Final. In 1979, the network began carrying the Gentlemen's Singles Final live, and in 1982, the Ladies' Singles Final. For the next few decades, NBC aired "Breakfast at Wimbledon" specials on weekends. Live coverage started early in the morning (the US being a minimum of 5 hours behind the UK) and continued well into the afternoon, interspersed with commentary and interviews from Bud Collins. Collins was dismissed by NBC in 2007, but was promptly hired by ESPN, the cable home for The Championships in the States. For many years NBC's primary Wimbledon host was veteran broadcaster Dick Enberg.

From 1975 to 1999, premium channel HBO carried weekday coverage of Wimbledon. Hosts included Jim Lampley, Billie Jean King, Martina Navratilova, John Lloyd and Barry MacKay among others. ESPN took over as the cable-television partner in 2003.

The AELTC grew frustrated with NBC's policy of waiting to begin its quarterfinal and semifinal coverage until after the conclusion of Today at 10 a.m. local, as well as broadcasting live only to the Eastern Time Zone and using tape-delay in all others. NBC also held over high-profile matches for delayed broadcast in its window, regardless of any ongoing matches. In one notorious incident in 2009, ESPN2's coverage of the Tommy Haas–Novak Djokovic quarterfinal was forced off the air nationwide when it ran past 10 a.m. Eastern, after which NBC showed the conclusion of the match on tape only after presenting the previous Ivo Karlović–Roger Federer quarterfinal in full. Beginning with the 2012 tournament, coverage moved to ESPN and ESPN2, marking the second major tennis championship (after the Australian Open) where live coverage is exclusively on pay television, while ESPN Deportes provides coverage in Spanish. The Finals are also broadcast tape-delayed on ABC. On 9 July 2021, ESPN and the AELTC reached an agreement to extend ESPN's coverage for 12 years, beginning 2024 until 2035. This agreement included live coverage of the middle weekend on ABC starting in 2022, following the announcement that play would occur on the middle Sunday, historically a rest day.

Taped coverage using the world feed is aired in primetime and overnights on Tennis Channel and is branded Wimbledon Primetime.

In Canada, coverage of Wimbledon is exclusively carried by TSN and RDS, which are co-owned by Bell Media and ESPN. Prior to 2012, CBC Television and SRC were the primary broadcaster of Wimbledon for Canada, and its live coverage of the tournament predated "Breakfast at Wimbledon" by over a decade, Canada being at least four hours from its fellow Commonwealth realm.

In Mexico, the Televisa family of networks has aired Wimbledon since the early 1960s. Presently, most weekend matches are broadcast through Canal 5 with the weekday matches broadcast on the Televisa Deportes Network. As Mexico is six hours behind the U.K., some Canal 5 affiliates air the weekend matches as the first program of the day after sign-on. Although Mexico had begun broadcasting in colour in 1962, Wimbledon continued to air in black and white in Mexico until colour television came to the United Kingdom in 1967.

In most of the remainder of Latin America, Wimbledon airs on ESPN, as do the other Grand Slam tournaments. In Brazil, SporTV had exclusive rights to the broadcast, but now it only airs on ESPN and Disney+.

==== Other countries ====
In several European countries, Wimbledon is shown live on Eurosport 1, Eurosport 2 and the Eurosport Player. Although there are some exceptions, as in Denmark, where the Danish TV2 holds the right to show matches until 2022 and in Italy where Sky Sport and SuperTennis holds the rights to show live matches until 2022. In the Netherlands Center Court is shown live on Eurosport 1 and all other courts are shown live on the Eurosport Player. But Court One is covered live on Ziggo Sport/Ziggo Sport Select. Wimbledon has been exclusively broadcast on Sky Sport in Germany since 2007. In December 2018, Sky extended its contract for Austria, Germany and Switzerland until 2022.

In Australia, the free-to-air Nine Network covered Wimbledon for almost 40 years but decided to drop their broadcast following the 2010 tournament, citing declining ratings and desire to use money saved to bid on other sports coverage. In April 2011, it was announced that the Seven Network, the then-host broadcaster of the Australian Open, along with its sister channel 7Two would broadcast the event from 2011. Pay television network Fox Sports Australia also covered the event. Free-to-air coverage returned to Nine Network in 2021. In India and its Subcontinental region, it is broadcast on Star Sports. In Pakistan it is broadcast on PTV Sports.

Coverage is free-to-air in New Zealand through TVNZ One, beginning each night at 11 pm (midday in London). In 2017 their new channel, TVNZ Duke (also free-to-air), carried an alternative to the main feed, including (for example) matches on outside courts involving New Zealand players.

Fox Sports Asia held broadcasting rights across Southeast Asia from 1992 until network's shutdown in 2021. SPOTV currently holds broadcasting rights across Southeast Asia.

Most matches are also available for viewing through internet betting websites and other live streaming services, as television cameras are set up to provide continuous coverage on nearly all the courts.

== Trophies, prize money and ranking points ==
=== Trophies ===
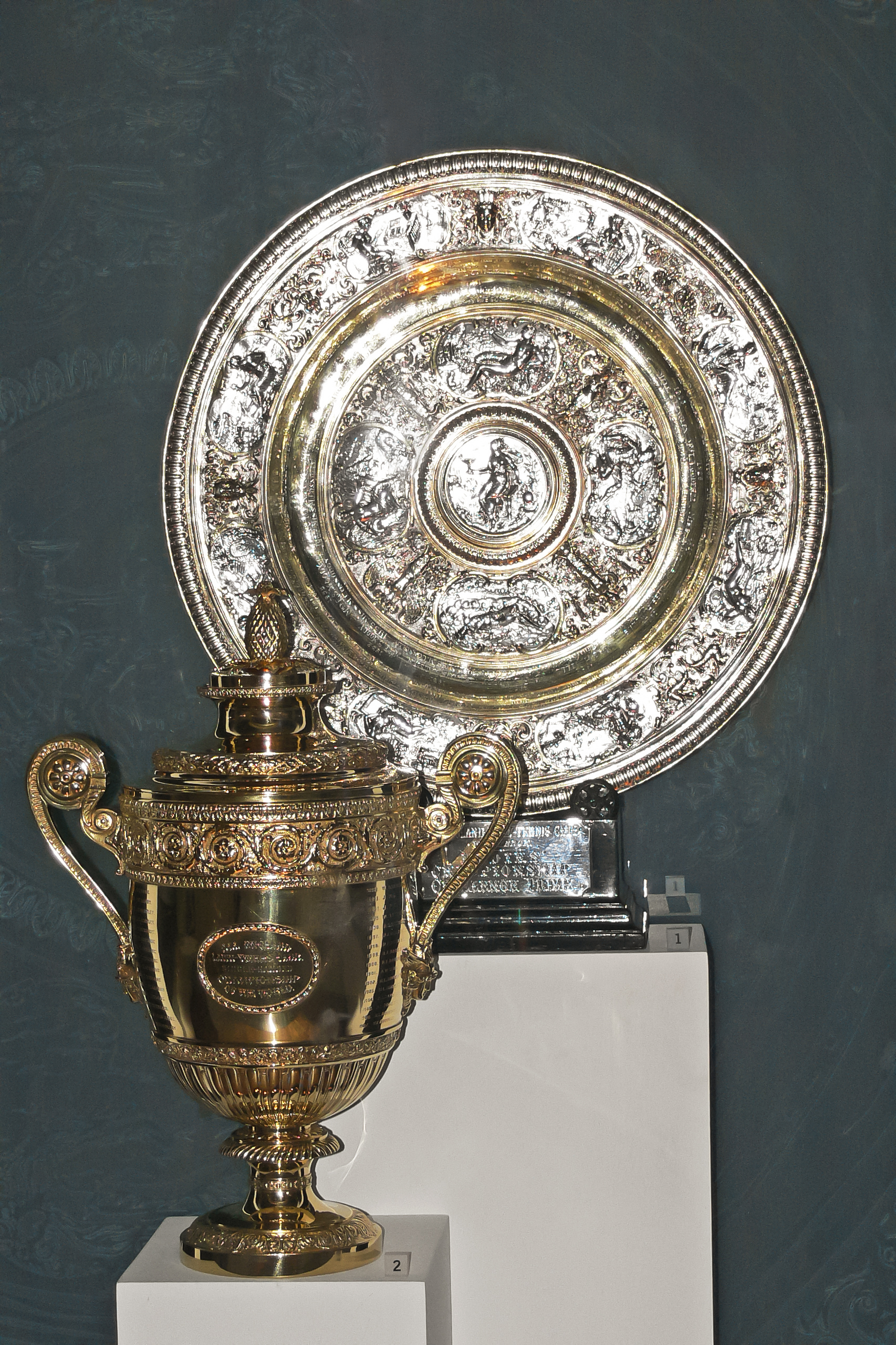
The Ladies' (top) and Gentlemen's singles trophies

The Gentlemen's Singles champion is presented with a silver gilt cup 18.5 inches (about 47 cm) in height and 7.5 inches (about 19 cm) in diameter. The trophy is decorated with a variety of symbols, including a miniature gold pineapple. The trophy has been awarded since 1887 and bears the inscription: "All England Lawn Tennis Club Single Handed Championship of the World". The actual trophy remains the property of the All England Club in their museum, so the champion receives a three-quarter size replica of the Cup bearing the names of all past Champions (height 13.5 inches, 34 cm).

The Ladies' Singles champion is presented with a sterling silver salver commonly known as the "Venus Rosewater Dish", or simply the "Rosewater Dish". The salver, which is 18.75 inches (about 48 cm) in diameter, is decorated with figures from mythology. The actual dish remains the property of the All England Club in their museum, so the champion receives a miniature replica bearing the names of all past Champions. From 1949 to 2006 the replica was 8 inches in diameter, and since 2007 it has been a three-quarter size replica with a diameter of 13.5 inches.

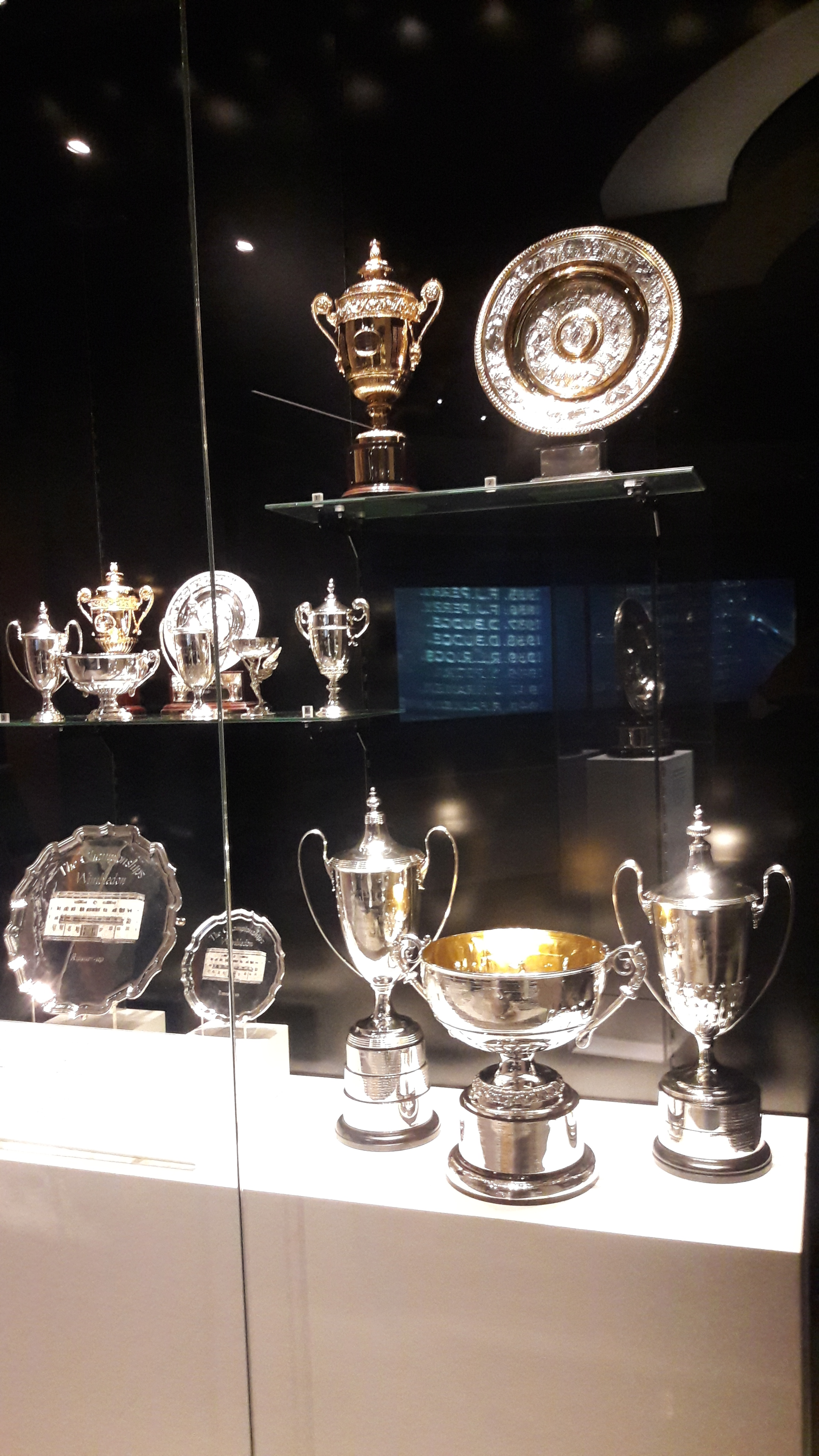
The various trophies contested at the Wimbledon championships being displayed at the All England Club museum

The winner of the Gentlemen's Doubles, Ladies' Doubles, and Mixed Doubles events receive silver cups. A trophy is awarded to each player in the Doubles pair, unlike the other Grand Slam tournaments where the winning Doubles duo shares a single trophy. The Gentlemen's Doubles silver challenge cup was originally from the Oxford University Lawn Tennis Club and donated to the All England Club in 1884. The Ladies' Doubles Trophy, a silver cup and cover known as The Duchess of Kent Challenge Cup, was presented to the All England Club in 1949 by The Duchess of Kent. The Mixed Doubles Trophy is a silver challenge cup and cover presented to the All England Club by the family of two-time Wimbledon doubles winner Sydney Smith.

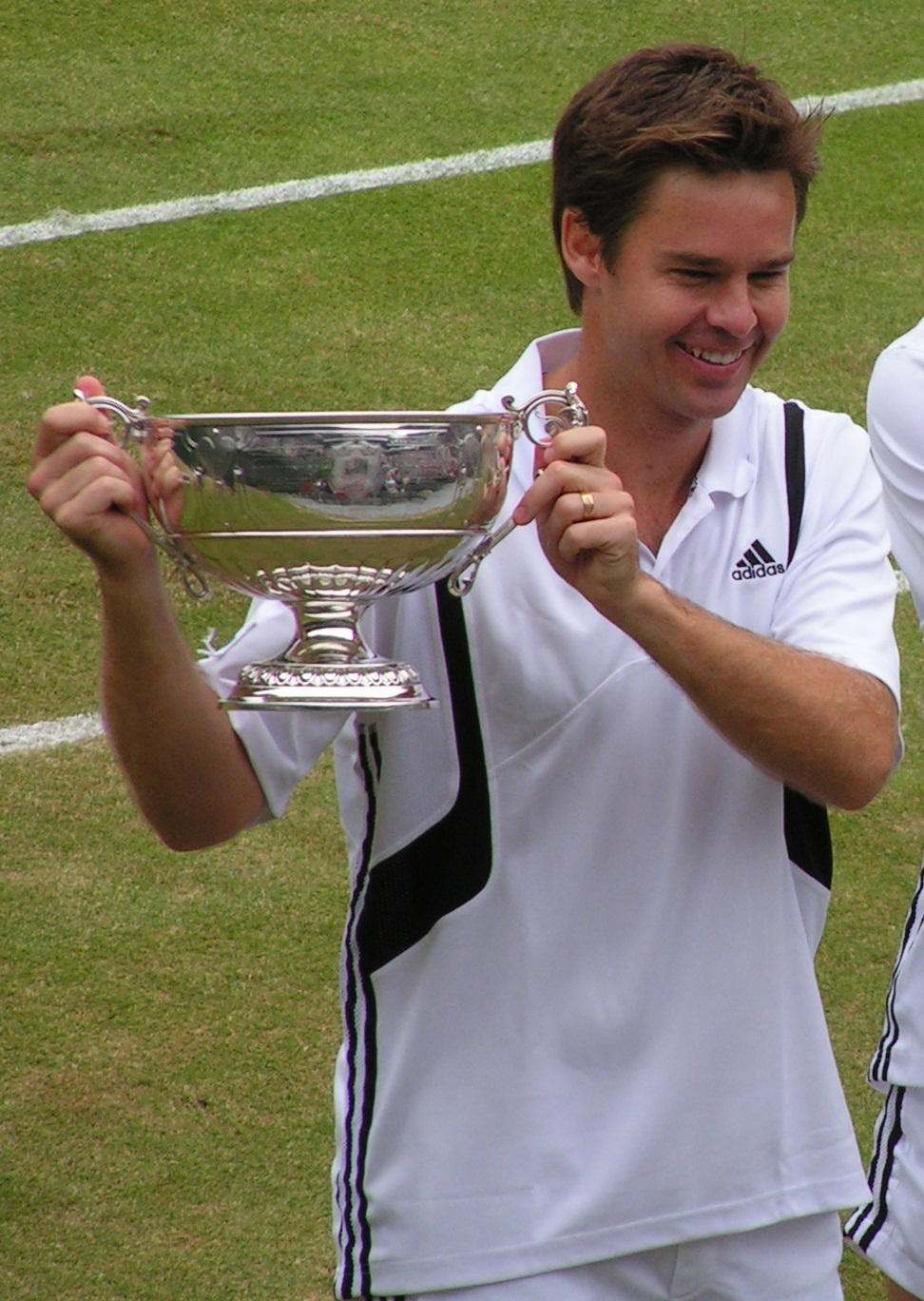
Todd Woodbridge holding the Gentlemen's doubles silver challenge cup in 2004

The runner-up in each event receives an inscribed silver plate. The trophies are usually presented by the Patron of the All England Club, The Princess of Wales.

=== Prize money ===
Prize money was first awarded in 1968, the year that professional players were allowed to compete in the Championships for the first time. Total prize money was £26,150; the winner of the men's title earned £2,000 (equivalent to £30,600 in 2025) while the women's singles champion received £750 (equivalent to £11,500 in 2025). In 2007, Wimbledon and the French Open became the last grand slam tournaments to award unequal prize money to women and men.

Year	Gentlemen's singles	Gentlemen's doubles (pair)	Ladies' singles	Ladies' doubles (pair)	Mixed doubles (pair)	Total for tournament
1968	£2,000	£800	£750	£500	£450	£26,150
1969	£3,000	£1,000	£1,500	£600	£500	£33,370
1970	£3,000	£1,000	£1,500	£600	£500	£41,650
1971	£3,750	£750	£1,800	£450	£375	£37,790
1972	£5,000	£1,000	£3,000	£600	£500	£50,330
1973	£5,000	£1,000	£3,000	£600	£500	£52,400
1974	£10,000	£2,000	£7,000	£1,200	£1,000	£97,100
1975	£10,000	£2,000	£7,000	£1,200	£1,000	£114,875
1976	£12,500	£3,000	£10,000	£2,400	£2,000	£157,740
1977	£15,000	£6,000	£13,500	£5,200	£3,000	£222,540
1978	£19,000	£7,500	£17,100	£6,500	£4,000	£279,023
1979	£20,000	£8,000	£18,000	£6,930	£4,200	£277,066
1980	£20,000	£8,400	£18,000	£7,276	£4,420	£293,464
1981	£21,600	£9,070	£19,400	£7,854	£4,770	£322,136
1982	£41,667	£16,666	£37,500	£14,450	£6,750	£593,366
1983	£66,600	£26,628	£60,000	£23,100	£12,000	£978,211
1984	£100,000	£40,000	£90,000	£34,700	£18,000	£1,461,896
1985	£130,000	£47,500	£117,000	£41,100	£23,400	£1,934,760
1986	£140,000	£48,500	£126,000	£42,060	£25,200	£2,119,780
1987	£155,000	£53,730	£139,500	£46,500	£27,900	£2,470,020
1988	£165,000	£57,200	£148,500	£49,500	£29,700	£2,612,126
1989	£190,000	£65,870	£171,000	£56,970	£34,200	£3,133,749
1990	£230,000	£94,230	£207,000	£81,510	£40,000	£3,819,730
1991	£240,000	£98,330	£216,000	£85,060	£41,720	£4,010,970
1992	£265,000	£108,570	£240,000	£93,920	£46,070	£4,416,820
1993	£305,000	£124,960	£275,000	£108,100	£53,020	£5,048,450
1994	£345,000	£141,350	£310,000	£122,200	£60,000	£5,682,170
1995	£365,000	£149,540	£328,000	£129,300	£63,500	£6,025,550
1996	£392,500	£160,810	£353,000	£139,040	£68,280	£6,465,910
1997	£415,000	£170,030	£373,500	£147,010	£72,200	£6,884,952
1998	£435,000	£178,220	£391,500	£154,160	£75,700	£7,207,590
1999	£455,000	£186,420	£409,500	£167,770	£79,180	£7,595,330
2000	£477,500	£195,630	£430,000	£176,070	£83,100	£8,056,480
2001	£500,000	£205,000	£462,500	£189,620	£87,000	£8,525,280
2002	£525,000	£210,000	£486,000	£194,250	£88,500	£8,825,320
2003	£575,000	£210,000	£535,000	£194,250	£88,500	£9,373,990
2004	£602,500	£215,000	£560,500	£200,000	£90,000	£9,707,280
2005	£630,000	£218,500	£600,000	£203,250	£90,000	£10,085,510
2006	£655,000	£220,690	£625,000	£205,280	£90,000	£10,378,710
2007	£700,000	£222,900	£700,000	£222,900	£90,000	£11,282,710
2008	£750,000	£230,000	£750,000	£230,000	£92,000	£11,812,000
2009	£850,000	£230,000	£850,000	£230,000	£92,000	£12,550,000
2010	£1,000,000	£240,000	£1,000,000	£240,000	£92,000	£13,725,000
2011	£1,100,000	£250,000	£1,100,000	£250,000	£92,000	£14,600,000
2012	£1,150,000	£260,000	£1,150,000	£260,000	£92,000	£16,060,000
2013	£1,600,000	£300,000	£1,600,000	£300,000	£92,000	£22,560,000
2014	£1,760,000	£325,000	£1,760,000	£325,000	£96,000	£25,000,000
2015	£1,880,000	£340,000	£1,880,000	£340,000	£100,000	£26,750,000
2016	£2,000,000	£350,000	£2,000,000	£350,000	£100,000	£28,100,000
2017	£2,200,000	£400,000	£2,200,000	£400,000	£100,000	£31,600,000
2018	£2,250,000	£450,000	£2,250,000	£450,000	£110,000	£34,000,000
2019	£2,350,000	£540,000	£2,350,000	£540,000	£116,000	£38,000,000
2021	£1,700,000	£480,000	£1,700,000	£480,000	£100,000	£35,016,000
2022	£2,000,000	£540,000	£2,000,000	£540,000	£124,000	£40,350,000
2023	£2,350,000	£600,000	£2,350,000	£600,000	£128,000	£44,700,000
2024	£2,700,000	£650,000	£2,700,000	£650,000	£130,000	£50,000,000
2025	£3,000,000	£680,000	£3,000,000	£680,000	£135,000	£53,550,000
2026	£3,600,000	£760,000	£3,600,000	£760,000	£148,000	£64,200,000

The bulk of the increases in 2012 were given to players losing in earlier rounds. This move was in response to the growing angst among lower-ranked players concerning the inadequacy of their pay. Sergiy Stakhovsky, a member of the ATP Player Council and who was at the time ranked 68th, was among the most vocal in the push for higher pay for players who bow out in the earlier rounds. In an interview Stakhovsky intimated that it is not uncommon for lower-ranked players to be in financial debt after playing certain tour events, if they had a poor result. In 2013 the losers in the earlier singles rounds of the tournament saw a highest 62% increase in their pay while the total prize money of the doubles increased by 22%.The prize money for participants of the qualifying matches saw an increase of 41%.

2025 Gentlemen's & Ladies' prize money
Event	W	F	SF	QF	Round of 16	Round of 32	Round of 64	Round of 128^{1}	Q3	Q2	Q1
Singles	£3,000,000	£1,520,000	£775,000	£400,000	£240,000	£152,000	£99,000	£66,000	£41,500	£26,000	£15,500
Doubles	£680,000	£345,000	£174,000	£87,500	£43,750	£26,000	£16,500	—N/a	—N/a	—N/a	—N/a

Doubles prize money is per team.

=== Ranking points ===
Ranking points for the ATP and WTA have varied at Wimbledon through the years but at present, individual players receive the following points:

Event		W	F	SF	QF	R16	R32	R64	R128
Singles	Gentlemen	2000	1300	800	400	200	100	50	10
Singles	Ladies	2000	1300	780	430	240	130	70	10
Doubles	Gentlemen	2000	1200	720	360	180	90	0	–
Doubles	Ladies	2000	1300	780	430	240	130	10	–

== Champions ==
=== Past champions ===
- Gentlemen's singles
- Ladies' singles
- Gentlemen's doubles
- Ladies' doubles
- Mixed doubles
- All champions

=== Current champions ===
2025/2026 Wimbledon Championships
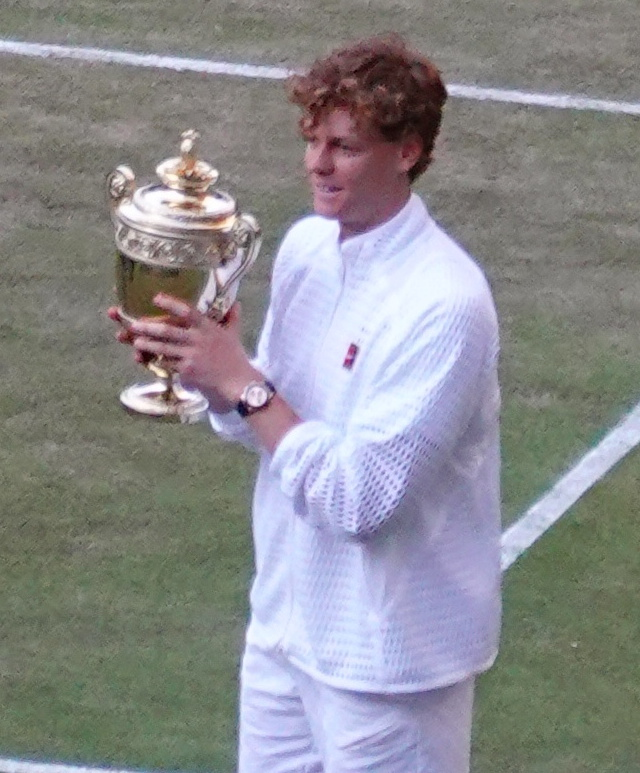
Jannik Sinner, the 2026 gentlemen's singles champion.

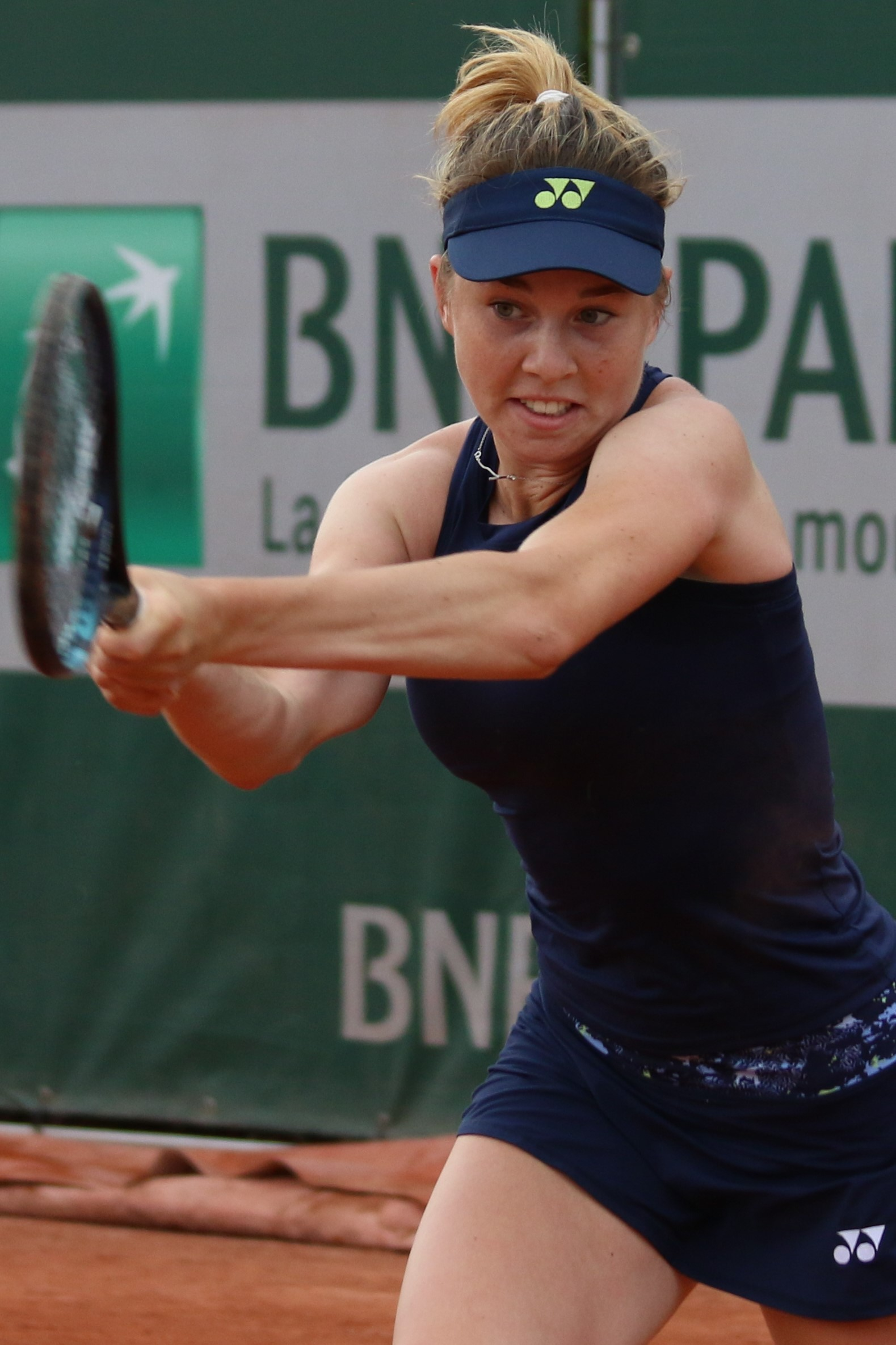
Linda Nosková, the 2026 ladies' singles champion.

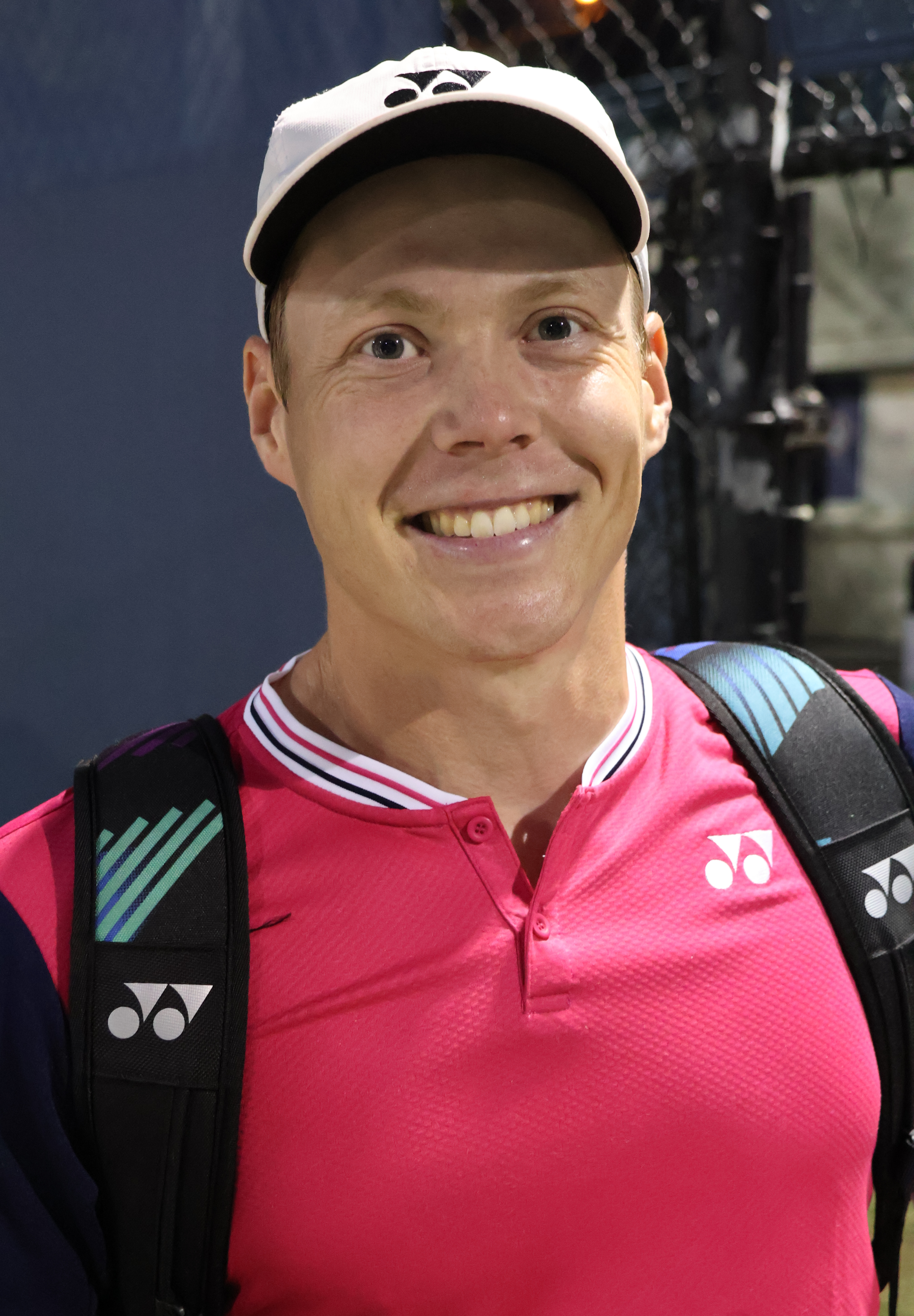
Harri Heliövaara was part of the 2026 winning men's doubles team.

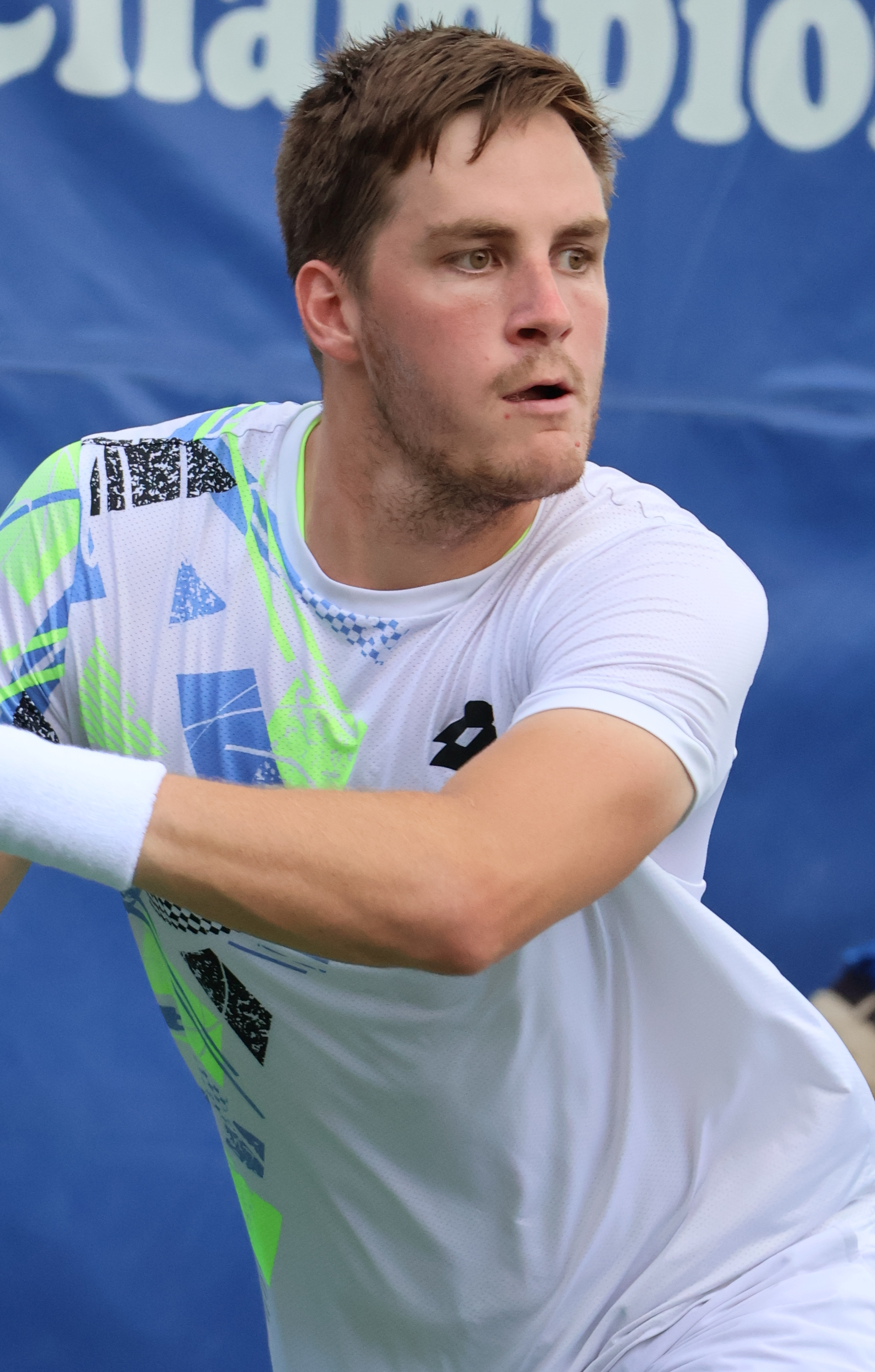
Henry Patten was part of the 2026 winning men's doubles team.

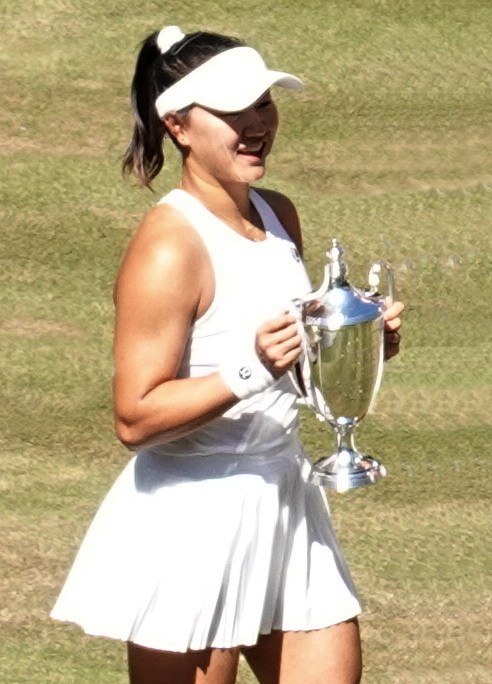
Guo Hanyu was part of the 2026 winning women's doubles team.

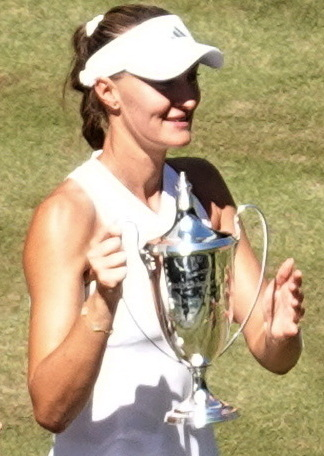
Kristina Mladenovic was part of the 2026 winning women's doubles team.

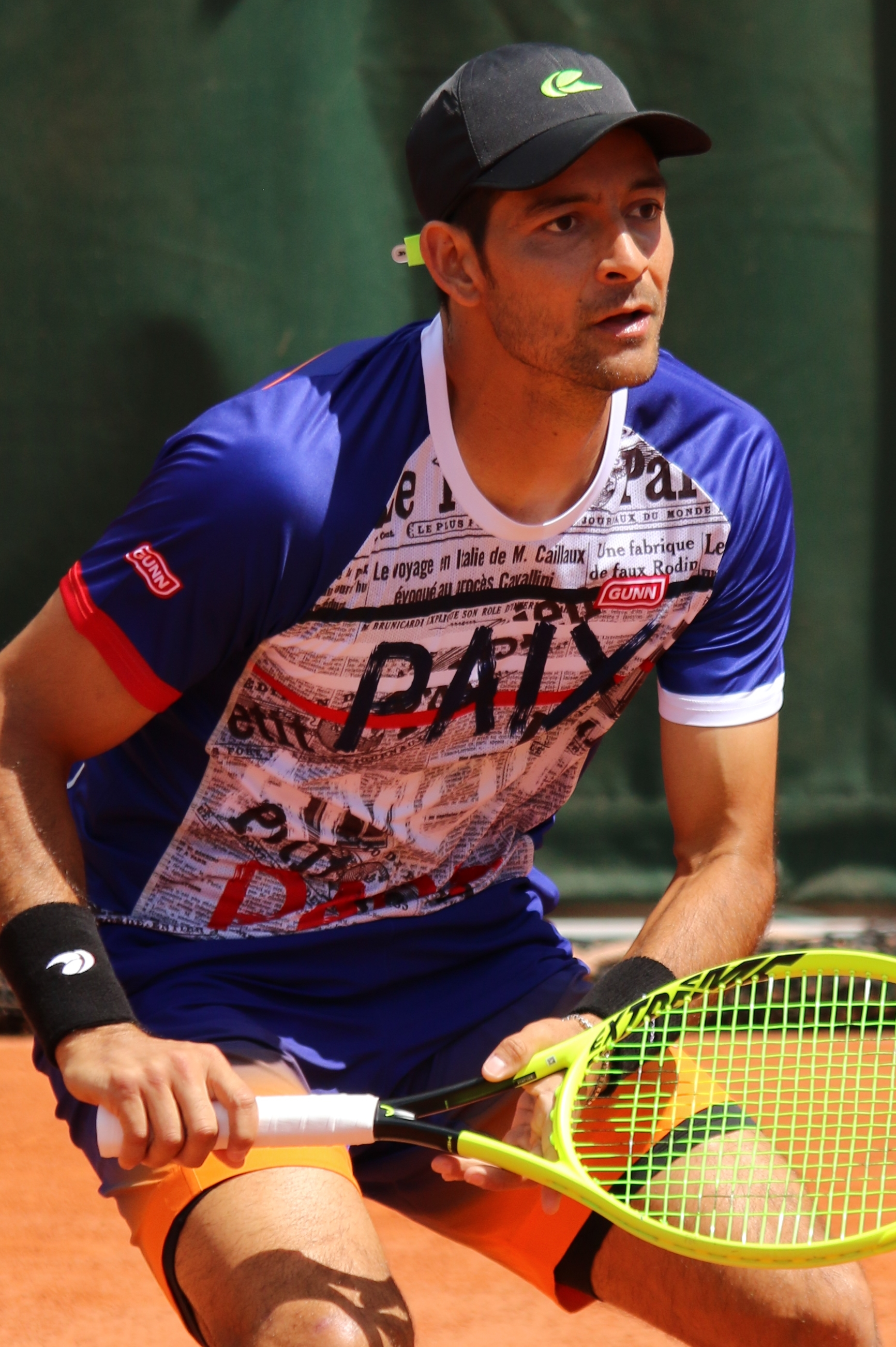
Marcelo Arévalo was part of the 2026 winning mixed doubles team.

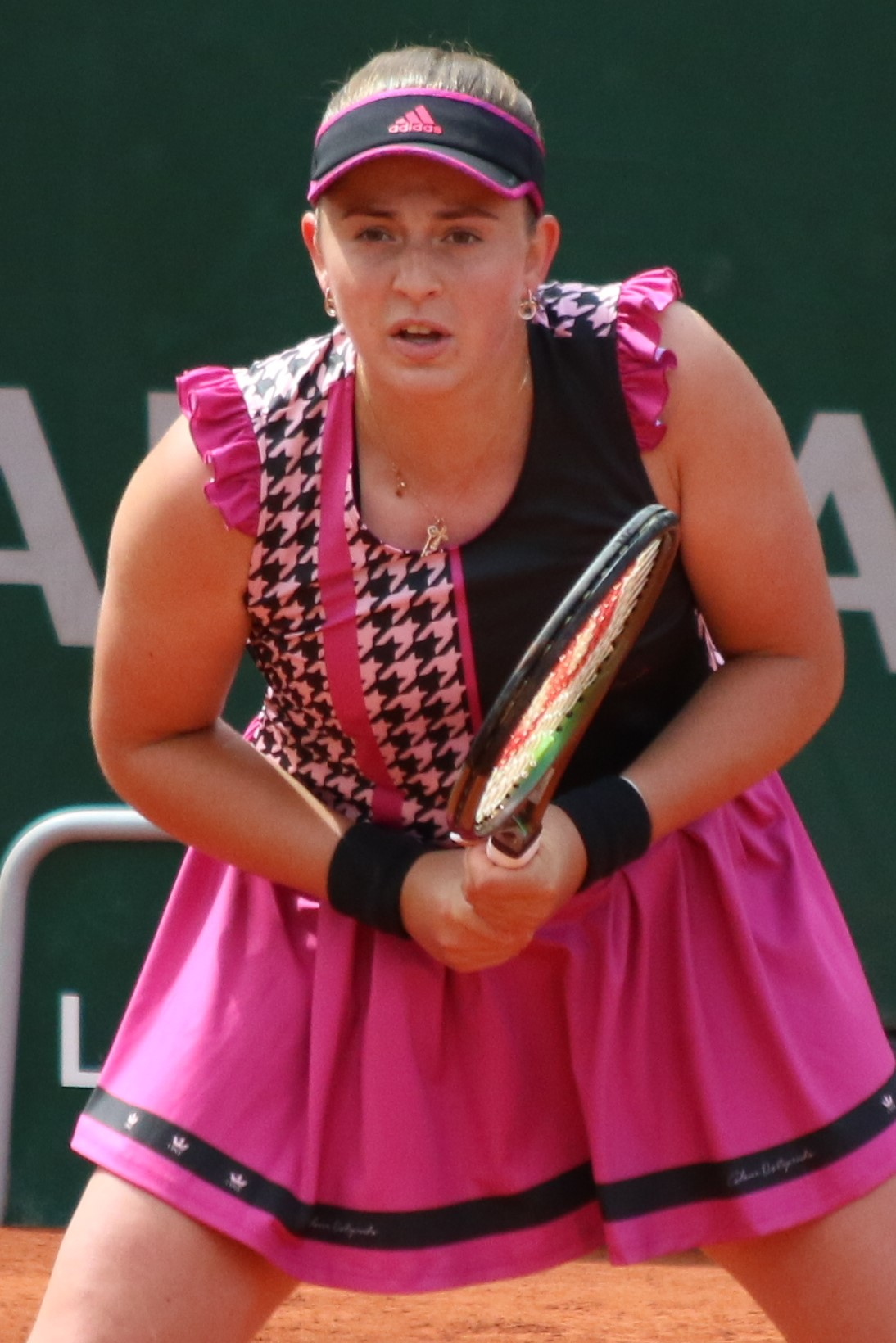
Jeļena Ostapenko was part of the 2026 winning mixed doubles team.

=== Most recent finals ===
2026 Event	Champion	Runner-up	Score
Gentlemen's singles	(Italy) Jannik Sinner	(Germany) Alexander Zverev	6–7^{(7–9)}, 7–6^{(7–2)}, 6–3, 6–4
Ladies' singles	(Czech Republic) Linda Nosková	(Czech Republic) Karolína Muchová	6–2, 5–7, 6–3
Gentlemen's doubles	(Finland) Harri Heliövaara (United Kingdom) Henry Patten	(El Salvador) Marcelo Arévalo (Croatia) Mate Pavić	7–6^{(7–4)}, 7–6^{(7–3)}
Ladies' doubles	(China) Guo Hanyu (France) Kristina Mladenovic	(Canada) Gabriela Dabrowski (Brazil) Luisa Stefani	6–3, 7–5
Mixed doubles	(El Salvador) Marcelo Arévalo (Latvia) Jeļena Ostapenko	(Australia) Marc Polmans (Australia) Storm Hunter	4–6, 7–5, 6–2

== Records ==
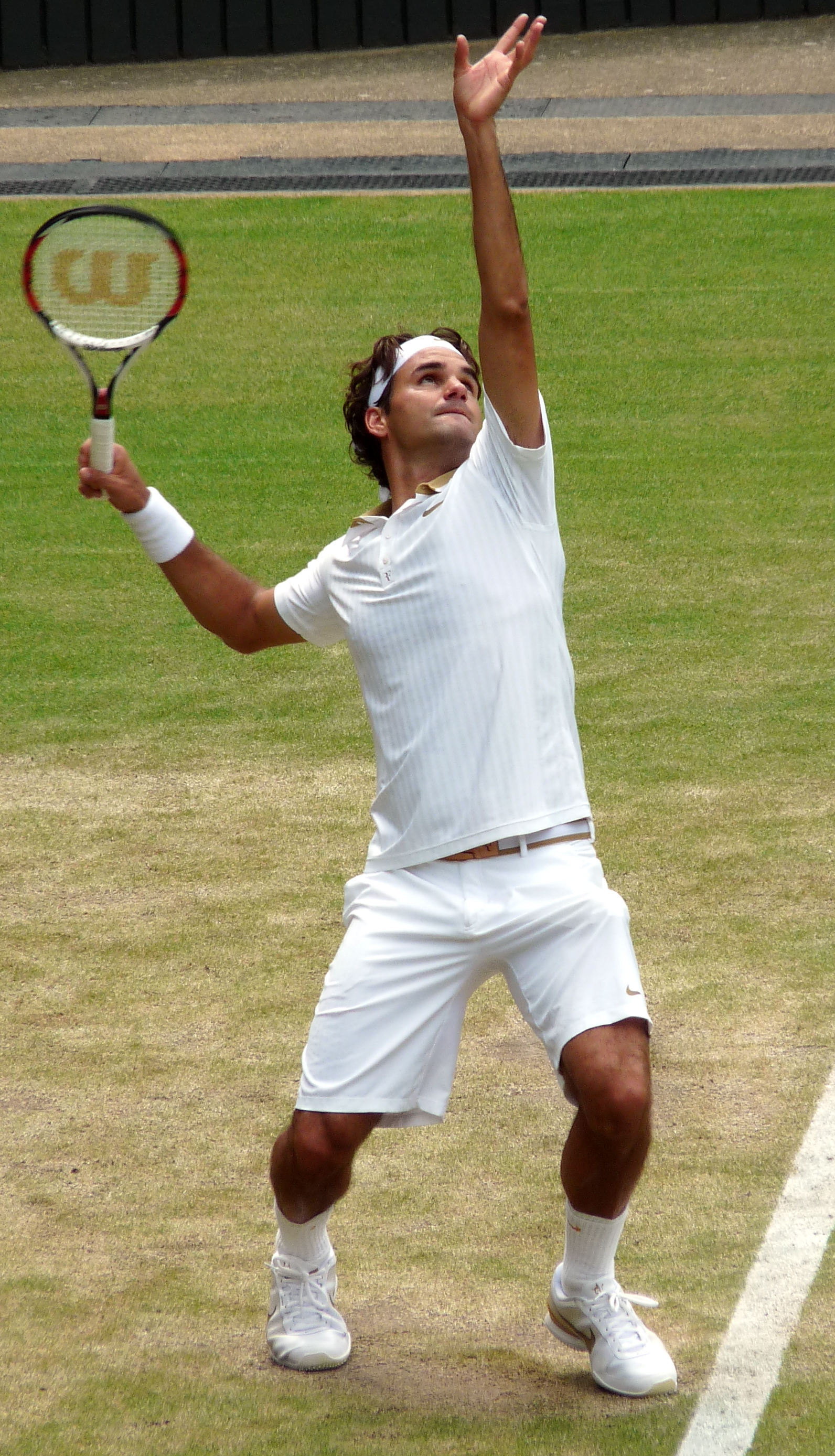
Roger Federer, the all-time record holder in men's singles

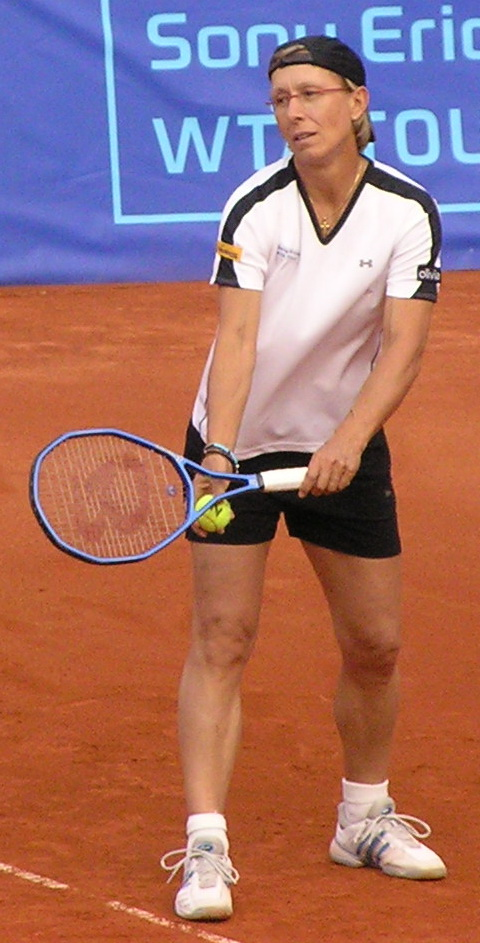
Martina Navratilova, the all-time record holder in women's singles

=== Gentlemen since 1877 ===
Record	Era	Player(s)	Count	Winning years
Most singles titles	Amateur Era	(United Kingdom) William Renshaw	7	1881–1886, 1889
Most singles titles	Open Era	(Switzerland) Roger Federer	8	2003–2007, 2009, 2012, 2017
Most consecutive singles titles	Amateur Era	(United Kingdom) William Renshaw (Note: In Renshaw's era, the defending champion was exempt from playing in the main draw, playing only in the final. This policy was abolished in 1922.)	6	1881–1886
Most consecutive singles titles	Open Era	(Sweden) Björn Borg (Switzerland) Roger Federer	5	1976–1980; 2003–2007
Most doubles titles	Amateur Era	(United Kingdom) Reginald Doherty (United Kingdom) Laurence Doherty	8	1897–1901, 1903–1905
Most doubles titles	Open Era	(Australia) Todd Woodbridge	9	1993–1997, 2000 (with Mark Woodforde), 2002–2004 (with Jonas Björkman)
Most consecutive doubles titles	Amateur Era	(United Kingdom) Reginald Doherty (United Kingdom) Laurence Doherty	5	1897–1901
Most consecutive doubles titles	Open Era	(Australia) Todd Woodbridge (Australia) Mark Woodforde	5	1993–1997
Most mixed doubles titles	Amateur Era	(Australia) Ken Fletcher (United States) Vic Seixas	4	1963, 1965–1966, 1968 (with Margaret Court); 1953–1956 (3 with Doris Hart, 1 with Shirley Fry Irvin)
Most mixed doubles titles	Open Era	(Australia) Owen Davidson (India) Leander Paes	4	1967, 1971, 1973–1974 (with Billie Jean King); 1999 (with Lisa Raymond), 2003 (with Martina Navratilova), 2010 (with Cara Black), 2015 (with Martina Hingis)
Most Championships (singles, doubles & mixed doubles)	Amateur Era	(United Kingdom) Laurence Doherty	13	1897–1906 (5 singles, 8 doubles)
Most Championships (singles, doubles & mixed doubles)	Open Era	(Australia) Todd Woodbridge	10	1993–2004 (9 doubles, 1 mixed doubles)

=== Ladies since 1884 ===
Record	Era	Player(s)	Count	Winning years
Most singles titles	Amateur Era	(United States) Helen Wills	8	1927–1930, 1932–1933, 1935, 1938
Most singles titles	Open Era	(United States) Martina Navratilova	9	1978–1979, 1982–1987, 1990
Most consecutive singles titles	Amateur Era	(France) Suzanne Lenglen	5	1919–1923
Most consecutive singles titles	Open Era	(United States) Martina Navratilova	6	1982–1987
Most doubles titles	Amateur Era	(United States) Elizabeth Ryan	12	1914 (with Agatha Morton), 1919–1923, 1925 (with Suzanne Lenglen), 1926 (with Mary Browne), 1927, 1930 (with Helen Wills), 1933–1934 (with Simonne Mathieu)
Most doubles titles	Open Era	(United States) Martina Navratilova	7	1976 (with Chris Evert), 1979 (with Billie Jean King), 1981–1984, 1986 (with Pam Shriver)
Most consecutive doubles titles	Amateur Era	(France) Suzanne Lenglen (United States) Elizabeth Ryan	5	1919–1923
Most consecutive doubles titles	Open Era	(United States) Martina Navratilova (United States) Pam Shriver (Soviet Union) / (Belarus) / (Belarus) Natasha Zvereva	4	1981–1984 1991 (with Larisa Neiland), 1992–1994 (with Gigi Fernández)
Most mixed doubles titles	Amateur Era	(United States) Elizabeth Ryan	7	1919, 1921, 1923 (with Randolph Lycett), 1927 (with Frank Hunter), 1928 (with Patrick Spence), 1930 (with Jack Crawford), 1932 (with Enrique Maier)
Most mixed doubles titles	Open Era	(United States) Martina Navratilova	4	1985 (with Paul McNamee), 1993 (with Mark Woodforde), 1995 (with Jonathan Stark), 2003 (with Leander Paes)
Most Championships (singles, doubles & mixed doubles)	Amateur Era	(United States) Elizabeth Ryan	19	1914–34 (12 doubles, 7 mixed doubles)
Most Championships (singles, doubles & mixed doubles)	Open Era	(United States) Martina Navratilova	20	1976–2003 (9 singles, 7 doubles, 4 mixed doubles)
Most Championships (singles, doubles & mixed doubles)	Combined	(United States) Billie Jean King	20	1961–79 (6 singles, 10 doubles, 4 mixed doubles)

=== Miscellaneous ===
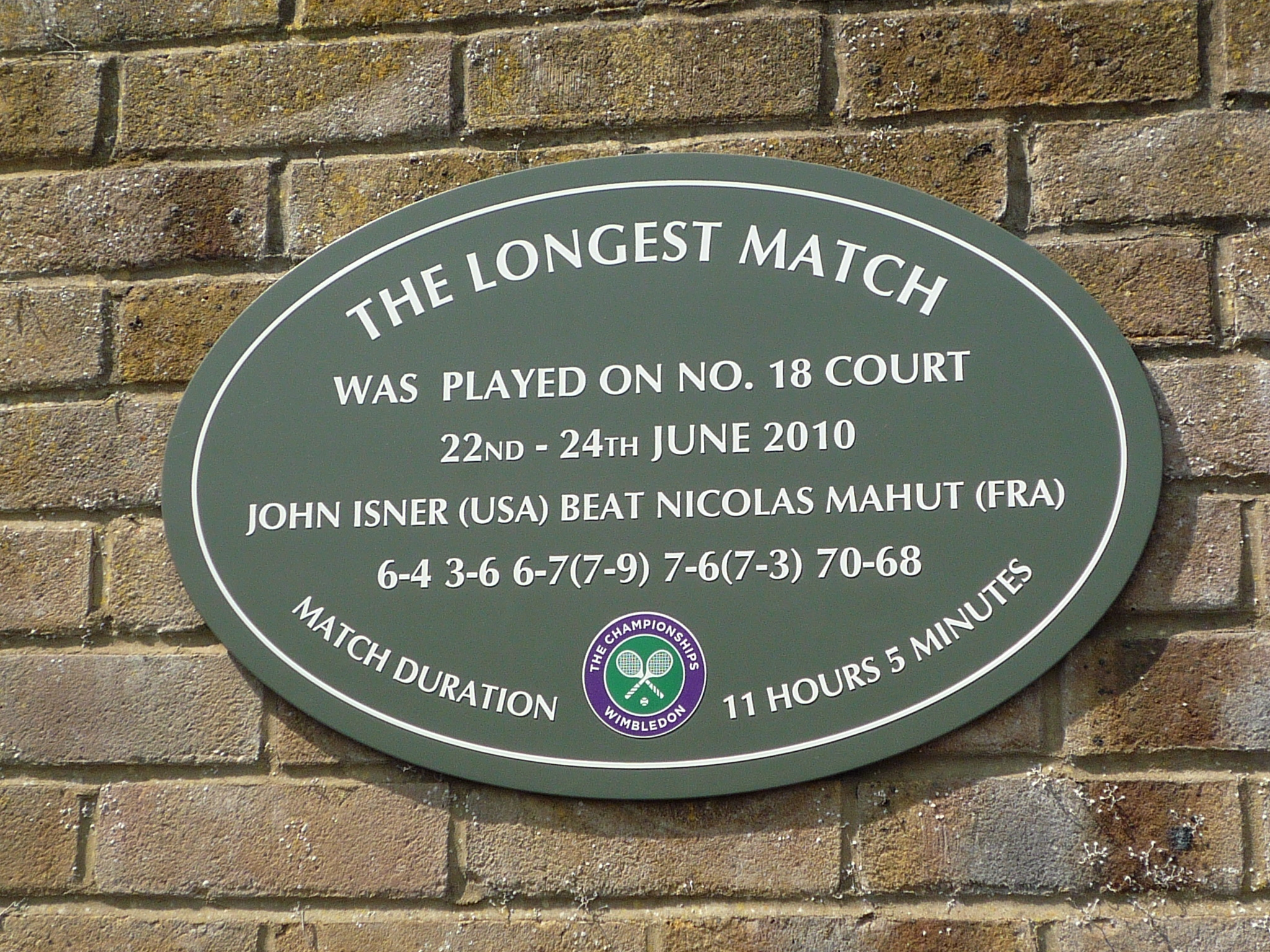
Commemorative plaque at Court 18 marking the longest tennis match in history

Record	M/W	Player(s)	Details	Year(s)
Unseeded champions	Men	(Germany) Boris Becker (Croatia) Goran Ivanišević	Ranked 20th Ranked 125th	1985; 2001
Unseeded champions	Women	(Czechoslovakia) Markéta Vondroušová	Ranked 42nd	2023
Youngest singles champion	Men	(Germany) Boris Becker	17 years 7 months	1985
Youngest singles champion	Women	(United Kingdom) Lottie Dod	15 years 9 months	1887
Oldest singles champion	Men	(United Kingdom) Arthur Gore	41 years 6 months	1909
Oldest singles champion	Women	(United Kingdom) Charlotte Cooper	37 years 9 months	1908
Lowest-ranked winner	Men	(Croatia) Goran Ivanišević	125th	2001
Lowest-ranked winner	Women	(Czechoslovakia) Markéta Vondroušová	42nd	2023
Singles winning %	Men	(Sweden) Björn Borg	92.72% (51–4)	1973–1981 (Open era)
Singles winning %	Women	(West Germany) Steffi Graf	90.36% (74–7)	1984–1999 (Open era)
Singles match wins	Men	(Serbia) Novak Djokovic	107	2005–2026 (Open era)
Singles match wins	Women	(Czechoslovakia) / (United States) Martina Navratilova	120	1973–2004 (Open era)
Most matches played	Men	(France) Jean Borotra	223	1922–39, 1948–64
Most matches played	Women	(Czechoslovakia) / (United States) Martina Navratilova	326	1973–2006
Most consecutive events played	Men	(United Kingdom) Arthur Gore	30	1888–1922
Most consecutive events played	Women	(United Kingdom) Virginia Wade	26	1960–1985
Longest match by time	Men	(United States) John Isner vs (France) Nicolas Mahut	11hrs 5mins	2010
Longest match by time	Women	(United States) Chanda Rubin vs (Canada) Patricia Hy-Boulais	3hrs 45mins	1995
Longest final by time	Men	(Serbia) Novak Djokovic vs (Switzerland) Roger Federer	4hrs 57mins	2019
Longest final by time	Women	(United States) Lindsay Davenport vs (United States) Venus Williams	2hrs 45mins	2005
Winners of both junior and senior singles	Men	(Sweden) Björn Borg (Australia) Pat Cash (Sweden) Stefan Edberg (Switzerland) Roger Federer	1972; 1982; 1983; 1998	1976–80 inclusive 1987; 1988, 1990; 2003–07, 2009, 2012, 2017
Winners of both junior and senior singles	Women	(United States) Karen Hantze (United Kingdom) Ann Haydon (Switzerland) Martina Hingis (France) Amélie Mauresmo (Australia) Ashleigh Barty (Poland) Iga Świątek	1960; 1956; 1994; 1996; 2011; 2018	1962; 1969 (under married name Jones); 1997; 2006; 2021; 2025

== See also ==
- 2012 Summer Olympics venues
- List of British finalists at Grand Slam tennis tournaments
- Wimbledon (film)
- Wimbledon Effect

=== Lists of champions ===
- List of Wimbledon champions (all events)
  - List of Wimbledon gentlemen's singles champions
  - List of Wimbledon ladies' singles champions
  - List of Wimbledon gentlemen's doubles champions
  - List of Wimbledon ladies' doubles champions
  - List of Wimbledon mixed doubles champions
- List of Wimbledon singles finalists during the Open Era, records and statistics

=== Other Grand Slam tournaments ===
- Australian Open
- French Open
- US Open

== Notes ==
Preceded by French Open	Grand Slam Tournament; June–July	Succeeded by US Open
