= List of Wimbledon gentlemen's doubles champions =

Wimbledon gentlemen's doubles champions
- Location: London; United Kingdom
- Venue: AELTC
- Governing body: AELTC / LTA
- Created: 1884
- Surface: Grass
- Prize money: £ 600,000 (2023)
- Website: wimbledon.com

Most titles
- Amateur era: 8: Laurence Doherty; Reginald Doherty
- Open era: 9: Todd Woodbridge

Most consecutive titles
- Amateur era: 5: Laurence Doherty; Reginald Doherty
- Open era: 5: Todd Woodbridge; Mark Woodforde

Current champion
- Harri Heliövaara; Henry Patten

The champions and runners-up of the Wimbledon Championships Gentlemen's Doubles tournament, first introduced to the championship in 1884. From 1915 to 1918, and from 1940 to 1945, no competition was held due to the two World Wars.

== Finalists ==
Legend
Regular competition
All comers' winner, challenge round winner ‡
Defending champion, challenge round winner †
All comers' winner, no challenge round ◊

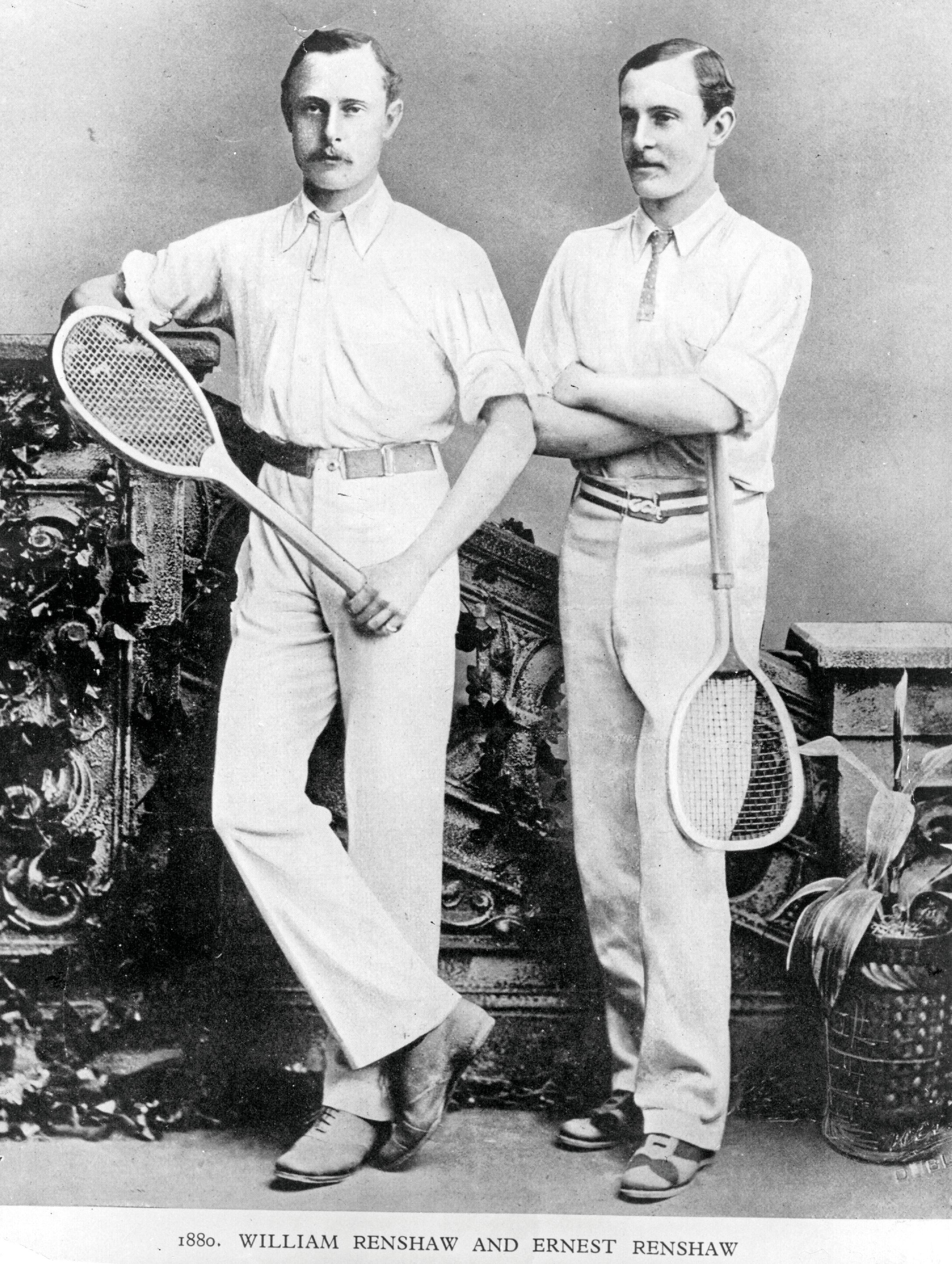
William and Ernest Renshaw

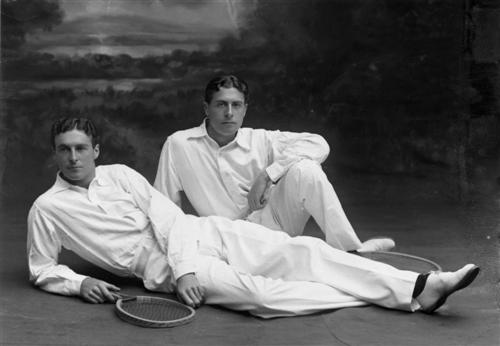
Brothers Laurence and Reginald Doherty won the Gentlemen's Doubles title eight times from 1897 to 1906.

=== Amateur Era ===
Year	Champions	Runners-up	Score
1884	(United Kingdom) Ernest Renshaw (United Kingdom) William Renshaw	(United Kingdom) Ernest Lewis (United Kingdom) Teddy Williams	6–3, 6–1, 1–6, 6–4
1885	(United Kingdom) Ernest Renshaw (United Kingdom) William Renshaw	(United Kingdom) Claude Farrer (United Kingdom) Arthur J. Stanley	6–3, 6–3, 10–8
1886	(United Kingdom) Ernest Renshaw (United Kingdom) William Renshaw †	(United Kingdom) Claude Farrer (United Kingdom) Arthur J. Stanley	6–3, 6–3, 4–6, 7–5
1887	(United Kingdom) Patrick Bowes-Lyon (United Kingdom) Herbert Wilberforce ◊	(United Kingdom) E. Barratt-Smith (United Kingdom) James Crispe	7–5, 6–3, 6–2
1888	(United Kingdom) Ernest Renshaw (United Kingdom) William Renshaw ‡	(United Kingdom) Patrick Bowes-Lyon (United Kingdom) Herbert Wilberforce	2–6, 1–6, 6–3, 6–4, 6–3
1889	(United Kingdom) Ernest Renshaw (United Kingdom) William Renshaw †	(United Kingdom) George Hillyard (United Kingdom) Ernest Lewis	6–4, 6–4, 3–6, 0–6, 6–1
1890	(United Kingdom) Joshua Pim (United Kingdom) Frank Stoker ◊	(United Kingdom) George Hillyard (United Kingdom) Ernest Lewis	6–0, 7–5, 6–4
1891	(United Kingdom) Herbert Baddeley (United Kingdom) Wilfred Baddeley ‡	(United Kingdom) Joshua Pim (United Kingdom) Frank Stoker	6–1, 6–3, 1–6, 6–2
1892	(United Kingdom) Harry Barlow (United Kingdom) Ernest Lewis ‡	(United Kingdom) Herbert Baddeley (United Kingdom) Wilfred Baddeley	4–6, 6–2, 8–6, 6–4
1893	(United Kingdom) Joshua Pim (United Kingdom) Frank Stoker ‡	(United Kingdom) Harry Barlow (United Kingdom) Ernest Lewis	4–6, 6–3, 6–1, 2–6, 6–0
1894	(United Kingdom) Herbert Baddeley (United Kingdom) Wilfred Baddeley ◊	(United Kingdom) Harry Barlow (United Kingdom) C. H. Martin	5–7, 7–5, 4–6, 6–3, 8–6
1895	(United Kingdom) Herbert Baddeley (United Kingdom) Wilfred Baddeley †	(United Kingdom) Wilberforce Eaves (United Kingdom) Ernest Lewis	8–6, 5–7, 6–4, 6–3
1896	(United Kingdom) Herbert Baddeley (United Kingdom) Wilfred Baddeley †	(United Kingdom) Reginald Doherty (United Kingdom) Harold Nisbet	1–6, 3–6, 6–4, 6–2, 6–1
1897	(United Kingdom) Laurence Doherty (United Kingdom) Reginald Doherty ◊	(United Kingdom) Herbert Baddeley (United Kingdom) Wilfred Baddeley	6–4, 4–6, 8–6, 6–4
1898	(United Kingdom) Laurence Doherty (United Kingdom) Reginald Doherty †	(United States) Clarence Hobart (United Kingdom) Harold Nisbet	6–4, 6–4, 6–2
1899	(United Kingdom) Laurence Doherty (United Kingdom) Reginald Doherty †	(United States) Clarence Hobart (United Kingdom) Harold Nisbet	7–5, 6–0, 6–2
1900	(United Kingdom) Laurence Doherty (United Kingdom) Reginald Doherty †	(United Kingdom) Herbert Roper Barrett (United Kingdom) Harold Nisbet	9–7, 7–5, 4–6, 3–6, 6–3
1901	(United Kingdom) Laurence Doherty (United Kingdom) Reginald Doherty †	(United States) Dwight F. Davis (United States) Holcombe Ward	4–6, 6–2, 6–3, 9–7
1902	(United Kingdom) Frank Riseley (United Kingdom) Sydney Smith ‡	(United Kingdom) Laurence Doherty (United Kingdom) Reginald Doherty	4–6, 8–6, 6–3, 4–6, 11–9
1903	(United Kingdom) Laurence Doherty (United Kingdom) Reginald Doherty ‡	(United Kingdom) Frank Riseley (United Kingdom) Sydney Smith	6–4, 6–4, 6–4
1904	(United Kingdom) Laurence Doherty (United Kingdom) Reginald Doherty †	(United Kingdom) Frank Riseley (United Kingdom) Sydney Smith	6–1, 6–2, 6–4
1905	(United Kingdom) Laurence Doherty (United Kingdom) Reginald Doherty †	(United Kingdom) Frank Riseley (United Kingdom) Sydney Smith	6–2, 6–4, 6–8, 6–3
1906	(United Kingdom) Frank Riseley (United Kingdom) Sydney Smith ‡	(United Kingdom) Laurence Doherty (United Kingdom) Reginald Doherty	6–8, 6–4, 5–7, 6–3, 6–3
1907	(Australia) Norman Brookes (New Zealand) Anthony Wilding ◊	(United States) Karl Behr (United States) Beals Wright	6–4, 6–4, 6–2
1908	(United Kingdom) Major Ritchie (New Zealand) Anthony Wilding ◊	(United Kingdom) Arthur Gore (United Kingdom) Herbert Roper Barrett	6–1, 6–2, 1–6, 9–7
1909	(United Kingdom) Arthur Gore (United Kingdom) Herbert Roper Barrett ◊	(Australia) Stanley Doust (New Zealand) Harry Parker	6–2, 6–1, 6–4
1910	(United Kingdom) Major Ritchie (New Zealand) Anthony Wilding ‡	(United Kingdom) Arthur Gore (United Kingdom) Herbert Roper Barrett	6–1, 6–1, 6–2
1911	(France) Max Decugis (France) André Gobert ‡	(United Kingdom) Major Ritchie (New Zealand) Anthony Wilding	9–7, 5–7, 6–3, 2–6, 6–2
1912	(United Kingdom) Charles Dixon (United Kingdom) Herbert Roper Barrett ‡	(France) Max Decugis (France) André Gobert	3–6, 6–3, 6–4, 7–5
1913	(United Kingdom) Charles Dixon (United Kingdom) Herbert Roper Barrett †	(Germany) Heinrich Kleinschroth (Germany) Friedrich-Wilhelm Rahe	6–2, 6–4, 4–6, 6–2
1914	(Australia) Norman Brookes (New Zealand) Anthony Wilding ‡	(United Kingdom) Herbert Roper Barrett (United Kingdom) Charles Dixon	6–1, 6–1, 5–7, 8–6
1915	No competition (due to World War I)		
1916	No competition (due to World War I)		
1917	No competition (due to World War I)		
1918	No competition (due to World War I)		
1919	(Australia) Pat O'Hara Wood (Australia) Ronald Thomas ◊	(Australia) Rodney Heath (Australia) Randolph Lycett	6–4, 6–2, 4–6, 6–2
1920	(United States) Chuck Garland (United States) R. Norris Williams ◊	(United Kingdom) Algernon Kingscote (United Kingdom) James Cecil Parke	4–6, 6–4, 7–5, 6–2
1921	(United Kingdom) Randolph Lycett (United Kingdom) Max Woosnam ◊	(United Kingdom) Arthur Lowe (United Kingdom) Gordon Lowe	6–3, 6–0, 7–5
1922	(Australia) James Anderson (United Kingdom) Randolph Lycett	(Australia) Pat O'Hara Wood (Australia) Gerald Patterson	3–6, 7–9, 6–4, 6–3, 11–9
1923	(United Kingdom) Leslie Godfree (United Kingdom) Randolph Lycett	(Spain) Eduardo Flaquer (Spain) Manuel de Gomar	6–3, 6–4, 3–6, 6–3
1924	(United States) Francis Hunter (United States) Vincent Richards	(United States) Watson Washburn (United States) R. Norris Williams	6–3, 3–6, 8–10, 8–6, 6–3
1925	(France) Jean Borotra (France) René Lacoste	(United States) Ray Casey (United States) John F. Hennessey	6–4, 11–9, 4–6, 1–6, 6–3
1926	(France) Jacques Brugnon (France) Henri Cochet	(United States) Howard Kinsey (United States) Vincent Richards	7–5, 4–6, 6–3, 6–2
1927	(United States) Francis Hunter (United States) Bill Tilden	(France) Jacques Brugnon (France) Henri Cochet	1–6, 4–6, 8–6, 6–3, 6–4
1928	(France) Jacques Brugnon (France) Henri Cochet	(Australia) John Hawkes (Australia) Gerald Patterson	13–11, 6–4, 6–4
1929	(United States) Wilmer Allison (United States) John Van Ryn	(United Kingdom) Ian Collins (United Kingdom) Colin Gregory	6–4, 5–7, 6–3, 10–12, 6–4
1930	(United States) Wilmer Allison (United States) John Van Ryn	(United States) John Doeg (United States) George Lott	6–3, 6–3, 6–2
1931	(United States) George Lott (United States) John Van Ryn	(France) Jacques Brugnon (France) Henri Cochet	6–2, 10–8, 9–11, 3–6, 6–3
1932	(France) Jean Borotra (France) Jacques Brugnon	(United Kingdom) Pat Hughes (United Kingdom) Fred Perry	6–0, 4–6, 3–6, 7–5, 7–5
1933	(France) Jean Borotra (France) Jacques Brugnon	(Japan) Ryosuke Nunoi (Japan) Jiro Sato	4–6, 6–3, 6–3, 7–5
1934	(United States) George Lott (United States) Lester Stoefen	(France) Jean Borotra (France) Jacques Brugnon	6–2, 6–3, 6–4
1935	(Australia) Jack Crawford (Australia) Adrian Quist	(United States) Wilmer Allison (United States) John Van Ryn	6–3, 5–7, 6–2, 5–7, 7–5
1936	(United Kingdom) Pat Hughes (United Kingdom) Raymond Tuckey	(United Kingdom) Charles Hare (United Kingdom) Frank Wilde	6–4, 3–6, 7–9, 6–1, 6–4
1937	(United States) Don Budge (United States) Gene Mako	(United Kingdom) Pat Hughes (United Kingdom) Raymond Tuckey	6–0, 6–4, 6–8, 6–1
1938	(United States) Don Budge (United States) Gene Mako	(Germany) Henner Henkel (Germany) Georg von Metaxa	6–0, 6–4, 6–8, 6–1
1939	(United States) Elwood Cooke (United States) Bobby Riggs	(United Kingdom) Charles Hare (United Kingdom) Frank Wilde	6–3, 3–6, 6–3, 9–7
1940	No competition (due to World War II)		
1941	No competition (due to World War II)		
1942	No competition (due to World War II)		
1943	No competition (due to World War II)		
1944	No competition (due to World War II)		
1945	No competition (due to World War II)		
1946	(United States) Tom Brown (United States) Jack Kramer	(Australia) Geoff Brown (Australia) Dinny Pails	6–4, 6–4, 6–2
1947	(United States) Bob Falkenburg (United States) Jack Kramer	(United Kingdom) Tony Mottram (Australia) Bill Sidwell	8–6, 6–3, 6–3
1948	(Australia) John Bromwich (Australia) Frank Sedgman	(United States) Tom Brown (United States) Gardnar Mulloy	5–7, 7–5, 7–5, 9–7
1949	(United States) Pancho Gonzales (United States) Frank Parker	(United States) Gardnar Mulloy (United States) Ted Schroeder	6–4, 6–4, 6–2
1950	(Australia) John Bromwich (Australia) Adrian Quist	(Australia) Geoff Brown (Australia) Bill Sidwell	7–5, 3–6, 6–3, 3–6, 6–2
1951	(Australia) Ken McGregor (Australia) Frank Sedgman	(Egypt) Jaroslav Drobný (South Africa) Eric Sturgess	3–6, 6–2, 6–3, 3–6, 6–3
1952	(Australia) Ken McGregor (Australia) Frank Sedgman	(United States) Vic Seixas (South Africa) Eric Sturgess	6–3, 7–5, 6–4
1953	(Australia) Lew Hoad (Australia) Ken Rosewall	(Australia) Rex Hartwig (Australia) Mervyn Rose	6–4, 7–5, 4–6, 7–5
1954	(Australia) Rex Hartwig (Australia) Mervyn Rose	(United States) Vic Seixas (United States) Tony Trabert	6–4, 6–4, 3–6, 6–4
1955	(Australia) Rex Hartwig (Australia) Lew Hoad	(Australia) Neale Fraser (Australia) Ken Rosewall	7–5, 6–4, 6–3
1956	(Australia) Lew Hoad (Australia) Ken Rosewall	(Italy) Nicola Pietrangeli (Italy) Orlando Sirola	7–5, 6–2, 6–1
1957	(United States) Gardnar Mulloy (United States) Budge Patty	(Australia) Neale Fraser (Australia) Lew Hoad	8–10, 6–4, 6–4, 6–4
1958	(Sweden) Sven Davidson (Sweden) Ulf Schmidt	(Australia) Ashley Cooper (Australia) Neale Fraser	6–4, 6–4, 8–6
1959	(Australia) Roy Emerson (Australia) Neale Fraser	(Australia) Rod Laver (Australia) Bob Mark	8–6, 6–3, 14–16, 9–7
1960	(Mexico) Rafael Osuna (United States) Dennis Ralston	(United Kingdom) Mike Davies (United Kingdom) Bobby Wilson	7–5, 6–3, 10–8
1961	(Australia) Roy Emerson (Australia) Neale Fraser	(Australia) Bob Hewitt (Australia) Fred Stolle	6–4, 6–8, 6–4, 6–8, 8–6
1962	(Australia) Bob Hewitt (Australia) Fred Stolle	(Socialist Federal Republic of Yugoslavia) Boro Jovanović (Socialist Federal Republic of Yugoslavia) Nikola Pilić	6–2, 5–7, 6–2, 6–4
1963	(Mexico) Rafael Osuna (Mexico) Antonio Palafox	(France) Jean-Claude Barclay (France) Pierre Darmon	4–6, 6–2, 6–2, 6–2
1964	(Australia) Bob Hewitt (Australia) Fred Stolle	(Australia) Roy Emerson (Australia) Ken Fletcher	7–5, 11–9, 6–4
1965	(Australia) John Newcombe (Australia) Tony Roche	(Australia) Ken Fletcher (Australia) Bob Hewitt	7–5, 6–3, 6–4
1966	(Australia) Ken Fletcher (Australia) John Newcombe	(Australia) Bill Bowrey (Australia) Owen Davidson	6–3, 6–4, 3–6, 6–3
1967	(South Africa) Bob Hewitt (South Africa) Frew McMillan	(Australia) Roy Emerson (Australia) Ken Fletcher	6–2, 6–3, 6–4

=== Open Era ===
Year	Champions	Runners-up	Score
1968	(Australia) John Newcombe (Australia) Tony Roche	(Australia) Ken Rosewall (Australia) Fred Stolle	3–6, 8–6, 5–7, 14–12, 6–3
1969	(Australia) John Newcombe (Australia) Tony Roche	(Netherlands) Tom Okker (United States) Marty Riessen	7–5, 11–9, 6–3
1970	(Australia) John Newcombe (Australia) Tony Roche	(Australia) Ken Rosewall (Australia) Fred Stolle	10–8, 6–3, 6–1
1971	(Australia) Roy Emerson (Australia) Rod Laver	(United States) Arthur Ashe (United States) Dennis Ralston	4–6, 9–7, 6–8, 6–4, 6–4
1972	(South Africa) Bob Hewitt (South Africa) Frew McMillan	(United States) Stan Smith (United States) Erik van Dillen	6–2, 6–2, 9–7
1973	(United States) Jimmy Connors (Romania) Ilie Năstase	(Australia) John Cooper (Australia) Neale Fraser	3–6, 6–3, 6–4, 8–9^{(3–7)}, 6–1
1974	(Australia) John Newcombe (Australia) Tony Roche	(United States) Bob Lutz (United States) Stan Smith	8–6, 6–4, 6–4
1975	(United States) Vitas Gerulaitis (United States) Sandy Mayer	(Rhodesia) Colin Dowdeswell (Australia) Allan Stone	7–5, 8–6, 6–4
1976	(United States) Brian Gottfried (Mexico) Raúl Ramírez	(Australia) Ross Case (Australia) Geoff Masters	3–6, 6–3, 8–6, 2–6, 7–5
1977	(Australia) Ross Case (Australia) Geoff Masters	(Australia) John Alexander (Australia) Phil Dent	6–3, 6–4, 3–6, 8–9^{(4–7)}, 6–4
1978	(South Africa) Bob Hewitt (South Africa) Frew McMillan	(United States) Peter Fleming (United States) John McEnroe	6–1, 6–4, 6–2
1979	(United States) Peter Fleming (United States) John McEnroe	(United States) Brian Gottfried (Mexico) Raúl Ramírez	4–6, 6–4, 6–2, 6–2
1980	(Australia) Peter McNamara (Australia) Paul McNamee	(United States) Bob Lutz (United States) Stan Smith	7–6^{(7–5)}, 6–3, 6–7^{(4–7)}, 6–4
1981	(United States) Peter Fleming (United States) John McEnroe	(United States) Bob Lutz (United States) Stan Smith	6–4, 6–4, 6–4
1982	(Australia) Peter McNamara (Australia) Paul McNamee	(United States) Peter Fleming (United States) John McEnroe	6–3, 6–2
1983	(United States) Peter Fleming (United States) John McEnroe	(United States) Tim Gullikson (United States) Tom Gullikson	6–4, 6–3, 6–4
1984	(United States) Peter Fleming (United States) John McEnroe	(Australia) Pat Cash (Australia) Paul McNamee	6–2, 5–7, 6–2, 3–6, 6–3
1985	(Switzerland) Heinz Günthardt (Hungary) Balázs Taróczy	(Australia) Patrick Cash (Australia) John Fitzgerald	6–4, 6–3, 4–6, 6–3
1986	(Sweden) Joakim Nyström (Sweden) Mats Wilander	(United States) Gary Donnelly (United States) Peter Fleming	7–6^{(7–4)}, 6–3, 6–3
1987	(United States) Ken Flach (United States) Robert Seguso	(Spain) Sergio Casal (Spain) Emilio Sánchez	3–6, 6–7^{(6–8)}, 7–6^{(7–3)}, 6–1, 6–4
1988	(United States) Ken Flach (United States) Robert Seguso	(Australia) John Fitzgerald (Sweden) Anders Järryd	6–4, 2–6, 6–4, 7–6^{(7–3)}
1989	(Australia) John Fitzgerald (Sweden) Anders Järryd	(United States) Rick Leach (United States) Jim Pugh	3–6, 7–6^{(7–4)}, 6–4, 7–6^{(7–4)}
1990	(United States) Rick Leach (United States) Jim Pugh	(South Africa) Pieter Aldrich (South Africa) Danie Visser	7–6^{(7–5)}, 7–6^{(7–4)}, 7–6^{(7–5)}
1991	(Australia) John Fitzgerald (Sweden) Anders Järryd	(Argentina) Javier Frana (Mexico) Leonardo Lavalle	6–3, 6–4, 6–7^{(7–9)}, 6–1
1992	(United States) John McEnroe (Germany) Michael Stich	(United States) Jim Grabb (United States) Richey Reneberg	5–7, 7–6^{(7–5)}, 3–6, 7–6^{(7–5)}, 19–17
1993	(Australia) Todd Woodbridge (Australia) Mark Woodforde	(Canada) Grant Connell (United States) Patrick Galbraith	7–5, 6–3, 7–6^{(7–4)}
1994	(Australia) Todd Woodbridge (Australia) Mark Woodforde	(Canada) Grant Connell (United States) Patrick Galbraith	7–6^{(7–3)}, 6–3, 6–1
1995	(Australia) Todd Woodbridge (Australia) Mark Woodforde	(United States) Rick Leach (United States) Scott Melville	7–5, 7–6^{(10–8)}, 7–6^{(7–5)}
1996	(Australia) Todd Woodbridge (Australia) Mark Woodforde	(Zimbabwe) Byron Black (Canada) Grant Connell	4–6, 6–1, 6–3, 6–2
1997	(Australia) Todd Woodbridge (Australia) Mark Woodforde	(Netherlands) Jacco Eltingh (Netherlands) Paul Haarhuis	7–6^{(7–4)}, 7–6^{(9–7)}, 5–7, 6–3
1998	(Netherlands) Jacco Eltingh (Netherlands) Paul Haarhuis	(Australia) Todd Woodbridge (Australia) Mark Woodforde	2–6, 6–4, 7–6^{(7–3)}, 5–7, 10–8
1999	(India) Mahesh Bhupathi (India) Leander Paes	(Netherlands) Paul Haarhuis (United States) Jared Palmer	6–7^{(10–12)}, 6–3, 6–4, 7–6^{(7–4)}
2000	(Australia) Todd Woodbridge (Australia) Mark Woodforde	(Netherlands) Paul Haarhuis (Australia) Sandon Stolle	6–3, 6–4, 6–1
2001	(United States) Donald Johnson (United States) Jared Palmer	(Czech Republic) Jiří Novák (Czech Republic) David Rikl	6–4, 4–6, 6–3, 7–6^{(8–6)}
2002	(Sweden) Jonas Björkman (Australia) Todd Woodbridge	(The Bahamas) Mark Knowles (Canada) Daniel Nestor	6–1, 6–2, 6–7^{(7–9)}, 7–5
2003	(Sweden) Jonas Björkman (Australia) Todd Woodbridge	(India) Mahesh Bhupathi (Belarus) Max Mirnyi	3–6, 6–3, 7–6^{(7–4)}, 6–3
2004	(Sweden) Jonas Björkman (Australia) Todd Woodbridge	(Austria) Julian Knowle (Serbia and Montenegro) Nenad Zimonjić	6–1, 6–4, 4–6, 6–4
2005	(Australia) Stephen Huss (South Africa) Wesley Moodie	(United States) Bob Bryan (United States) Mike Bryan	7–6^{(7–4)}, 6–3, 6–7^{(2–7)}, 6–3
2006	(United States) Bob Bryan (United States) Mike Bryan	(France) Fabrice Santoro (Serbia) Nenad Zimonjić	6–3, 4–6, 6–4, 6–2
2007	(France) Arnaud Clément (France) Michaël Llodra	(United States) Bob Bryan (United States) Mike Bryan	6–7^{(5–7)}, 6–3, 6–4, 6–4
2008	(Canada) Daniel Nestor (Serbia) Nenad Zimonjić	(Sweden) Jonas Björkman (Zimbabwe) Kevin Ullyett	7–6^{(14–12)}, 6–7^{(3–7)}, 6–3, 6–3
2009	(Canada) Daniel Nestor (Serbia) Nenad Zimonjić	(United States) Bob Bryan (United States) Mike Bryan	7–6^{(9–7)}, 6–7^{(3–7)}, 7–6^{(7–3)}, 6–3
2010	(Austria) Jürgen Melzer (Germany) Philipp Petzschner	(Sweden) Robert Lindstedt (Romania) Horia Tecău	6–1, 7–5, 7–5
2011	(United States) Bob Bryan (United States) Mike Bryan	(Sweden) Robert Lindstedt (Romania) Horia Tecău	6–3, 6–4, 7–6^{(7–2)}
2012	(United Kingdom) Jonathan Marray (Denmark) Frederik Nielsen	(Sweden) Robert Lindstedt (Romania) Horia Tecău	4–6, 6–4, 7–6^{(7–5)}, 6–7^{(5–7)}, 6–3
2013	(United States) Bob Bryan (United States) Mike Bryan	(Croatia) Ivan Dodig (Brazil) Marcelo Melo	3–6, 6–3, 6–4, 6–4
2014	(Canada) Vasek Pospisil (United States) Jack Sock	(United States) Bob Bryan (United States) Mike Bryan	7–6^{(7–5)}, 6–7^{(3–7)}, 6–4, 3–6, 7–5
2015	(Netherlands) Jean-Julien Rojer (Romania) Horia Tecău	(United Kingdom) Jamie Murray (Australia) John Peers	7–6^{(7–5)}, 6–4, 6–4
2016	(France) Pierre-Hugues Herbert (France) Nicolas Mahut	(France) Julien Benneteau (France) Édouard Roger-Vasselin	6–4, 7–6^{(7–1)}, 6–3
2017	(Poland) Łukasz Kubot (Brazil) Marcelo Melo	(Austria) Oliver Marach (Croatia) Mate Pavić	5–7, 7–5, 7–6^{(7–2)}, 3–6, 13–11
2018	(United States) Mike Bryan (United States) Jack Sock	(South Africa) Raven Klaasen (New Zealand) Michael Venus	6–3, 6–7^{(7–9)}, 6–3, 5–7, 7–5
2019	(Colombia) Juan Sebastián Cabal (Colombia) Robert Farah	(France) Nicolas Mahut (France) Édouard Roger-Vasselin	6–7^{(5–7)}, 7–6^{(7–5)}, 7–6^{(8–6)}, 6–7^{(5–7)}, 6–3
2020	No competition (due to COVID-19 pandemic)		
2021	(Croatia) Nikola Mektić (Croatia) Mate Pavić	(Spain) Marcel Granollers (Argentina) Horacio Zeballos	6–4, 7–6^{(7–5)}, 2–6, 7–5
2022	(Australia) Matthew Ebden (Australia) Max Purcell	(Croatia) Nikola Mektić (Croatia) Mate Pavić	7–6^{(7–5)}, 6–7^{(3–7)}, 4–6, 6–4, 7–6^{(10–2)}
2023	(Netherlands) Wesley Koolhof (United Kingdom) Neal Skupski	(Spain) Marcel Granollers (Argentina) Horacio Zeballos	6–4, 6–4
2024	(Finland) Harri Heliövaara (United Kingdom) Henry Patten	(Australia) Max Purcell (Australia) Jordan Thompson	6–7^{(7–9)}, 7–6^{(10–8)}, 7–6^{(11–9)}
2025	(United Kingdom) Julian Cash (United Kingdom) Lloyd Glasspool	(Australia) Rinky Hijikata (Netherlands) David Pel	6–2, 7–6^{(7–3)}
2026	(Finland) Harri Heliövaara (United Kingdom) Henry Patten	(El Salvador) Marcelo Arévalo (Croatia) Mate Pavić	7–6^{(7–4)}, 7–6^{(7–3)}

== See also ==
Wimbledon other competitions

- List of Wimbledon gentlemen's singles champions
- List of Wimbledon ladies' singles champions
- List of Wimbledon ladies' doubles champions
- List of Wimbledon mixed doubles champions

Grand Slam men's doubles

- List of Australian Open men's doubles champions
- List of French Open men's doubles champions
- List of US Open men's doubles champions
- List of Grand Slam men's doubles champions
