= List of Wimbledon champions =

The following is a list of Wimbledon champions in tennis:

== Champions ==
=== Senior ===
Year	Singles		Doubles		
Year	Gentlemen	Ladies	Gentlemen	Ladies	Mixed
1877	(United Kingdom) Spencer Gore	No competition	No competition	No competition	No competition
1878	(United Kingdom) Frank Hadow	No competition	No competition	No competition	No competition
1879	(United Kingdom) John Hartley (x2)	No competition	No competition	No competition	No competition
1880	(United Kingdom) John Hartley (x2)	No competition	No competition	No competition	No competition
1881	(United Kingdom) William Renshaw (x6)	No competition	No competition	No competition	No competition
1882	(United Kingdom) William Renshaw (x6)	No competition	No competition	No competition	No competition
1883	(United Kingdom) William Renshaw (x6)	No competition	No competition	No competition	No competition
1884	(United Kingdom) William Renshaw (x6)	(United Kingdom) Maud Watson (x2)	(United Kingdom) Ernest Renshaw (United Kingdom) William Renshaw (x3)	No competition	No competition
1885	(United Kingdom) William Renshaw (x6)	(United Kingdom) Maud Watson (x2)	(United Kingdom) Ernest Renshaw (United Kingdom) William Renshaw (x3)	No competition	No competition
1886	(United Kingdom) William Renshaw (x6)	(United Kingdom) Blanche Bingley Hillyard	(United Kingdom) Ernest Renshaw (United Kingdom) William Renshaw (x3)	No competition	No competition
1887	(United Kingdom) Herbert Lawford	(United Kingdom) Lottie Dod (x2)	(United Kingdom) Patrick Bowes-Lyon (United Kingdom) Herbert Wilberforce	No competition	No competition
1888	(United Kingdom) Ernest Renshaw	(United Kingdom) Lottie Dod (x2)	(United Kingdom) Ernest Renshaw (United Kingdom) William Renshaw (x2)	No competition	No competition
1889	(United Kingdom) William Renshaw	(United Kingdom) Blanche Bingley Hillyard	(United Kingdom) Ernest Renshaw (United Kingdom) William Renshaw (x2)	No competition	No competition
1890	(United Kingdom) Willoughby Hamilton	(United Kingdom of Great Britain and Ireland) Helen Rice (x4)	(United Kingdom) Joshua Pim (United Kingdom) Frank Stoker	No competition	No competition
1891	(United Kingdom) Wilfred Baddeley (x2)	(United Kingdom of Great Britain and Ireland) Helen Rice (x4)	(United Kingdom) Herbert Baddeley (United Kingdom) Wilfred Baddeley	No competition	No competition
1892	(United Kingdom) Wilfred Baddeley (x2)	(United Kingdom of Great Britain and Ireland) Helen Rice (x4)	(United Kingdom) Harry Barlow (United Kingdom) Ernest Lewis	No competition	No competition
1893	(United Kingdom) Joshua Pim (x2)	(United Kingdom of Great Britain and Ireland) Helen Rice (x4)	(United Kingdom) Joshua Pim (United Kingdom) Frank Stoker	No competition	No competition
1894	(United Kingdom) Joshua Pim (x2)	(United Kingdom) Blanche Bingley Hillyard	(United Kingdom) Herbert Baddeley (United Kingdom) Wilfred Baddeley (x3)	No competition	No competition
1895	(United Kingdom) Wilfred Baddeley	(United Kingdom) Charlotte Cooper Sterry (x2)	(United Kingdom) Herbert Baddeley (United Kingdom) Wilfred Baddeley (x3)	No competition	No competition
1896	(United Kingdom) Harold Mahony	(United Kingdom) Charlotte Cooper Sterry (x2)	(United Kingdom) Herbert Baddeley (United Kingdom) Wilfred Baddeley (x3)	No competition	No competition
1897	(United Kingdom) Reginald Doherty (x4)	(United Kingdom) Blanche Bingley Hillyard	(United Kingdom) Laurence Doherty (United Kingdom) Reginald Doherty (x5)	No competition	No competition
1898	(United Kingdom) Reginald Doherty (x4)	(United Kingdom) Charlotte Cooper Sterry	(United Kingdom) Laurence Doherty (United Kingdom) Reginald Doherty (x5)	No competition	No competition
1899	(United Kingdom) Reginald Doherty (x4)	(United Kingdom) Blanche Bingley Hillyard (x2)	(United Kingdom) Laurence Doherty (United Kingdom) Reginald Doherty (x5)	No competition	No competition
1900	(United Kingdom) Reginald Doherty (x4)	(United Kingdom) Blanche Bingley Hillyard (x2)	(United Kingdom) Laurence Doherty (United Kingdom) Reginald Doherty (x5)	No competition	No competition
1901	(United Kingdom) Arthur Gore	(United Kingdom) Charlotte Cooper Sterry	(United Kingdom) Laurence Doherty (United Kingdom) Reginald Doherty (x5)	No competition	No competition
1902	(United Kingdom) Laurence Doherty (x5)	(United Kingdom) Muriel Robb	(United Kingdom) Frank Riseley (United Kingdom) Sydney Smith	No competition	No competition
1903	(United Kingdom) Laurence Doherty (x5)	(United Kingdom) Dorothea Douglass (x2)	(United Kingdom) Laurence Doherty (United Kingdom) Reginald Doherty (x3)	No competition	No competition
1904	(United Kingdom) Laurence Doherty (x5)	(United Kingdom) Dorothea Douglass (x2)	(United Kingdom) Laurence Doherty (United Kingdom) Reginald Doherty (x3)	No competition	No competition
1905	(United Kingdom) Laurence Doherty (x5)	(United States) May Sutton Bundy	(United Kingdom) Laurence Doherty (United Kingdom) Reginald Doherty (x3)	No competition	No competition
1906	(United Kingdom) Laurence Doherty (x5)	(United Kingdom) Dorothea Douglass	(United Kingdom) Frank Riseley (United Kingdom) Sydney Smith	No competition	No competition
1907	(Australia) Norman Brookes	(United States) May Sutton Bundy	(Australia) Norman Brookes (New Zealand) Anthony Wilding	No competition	No competition
1908	(United Kingdom) Arthur Gore (x2)	(United Kingdom) Charlotte Cooper Sterry	(United Kingdom) Major Ritchie (New Zealand) Anthony Wilding	No competition	No competition
1909	(United Kingdom) Arthur Gore (x2)	(United Kingdom) Dora Boothby	(United Kingdom) Arthur Gore (United Kingdom) Herbert Roper Barrett	No competition	No competition
1910	(New Zealand) Anthony Wilding (x5)	(United Kingdom) Dorothea Lambert Chambers (x2)	(United Kingdom) Major Ritchie (New Zealand) Anthony Wilding	No competition	No competition
1911	(New Zealand) Anthony Wilding (x5)	(United Kingdom) Dorothea Lambert Chambers (x2)	(France) Max Decugis (France) André Gobert	No competition	No competition
1912	(New Zealand) Anthony Wilding (x5)	(United Kingdom) Ethel Thomson Larcombe	(United Kingdom) Charles Dixon (United Kingdom) Herbert Roper Barrett (x2)	No competition	No competition
1913	(New Zealand) Anthony Wilding (x5)	(United Kingdom) Dorothea Lambert Chambers (x2)	(United Kingdom) Charles Dixon (United Kingdom) Herbert Roper Barrett (x2)	(United Kingdom) Dora Boothby (United Kingdom) Winifred McNair	(United Kingdom) Hope Crisp (United Kingdom) Agnes Tuckey
1914	(New Zealand) Anthony Wilding (x5)	(United Kingdom) Dorothea Lambert Chambers (x2)	(Australia) Norman Brookes (New Zealand) Anthony Wilding	(United Kingdom) Agnes Morton (United States) Elizabeth Ryan	(United Kingdom) James Cecil Parke (United Kingdom) Ethel Larcombe
1915	No tournament due to World War I				
1916	No tournament due to World War I				
1917	No tournament due to World War I				
1918	No tournament due to World War I				
1919	(Australia) Gerald Patterson	(France) Suzanne Lenglen (x5)	(Australia) Pat O'Hara Wood (Australia) Ronald Thomas	(France) Suzanne Lenglen (United States) Elizabeth Ryan (x5)	(United Kingdom) Randolph Lycett (United States) Elizabeth Ryan
1920	(United States) Bill Tilden (x2)	(France) Suzanne Lenglen (x5)	(United States) Chuck Garland (United States) R. Norris Williams	(France) Suzanne Lenglen (United States) Elizabeth Ryan (x5)	(Australia) Gerald Patterson (France) Suzanne Lenglen
1921	(United States) Bill Tilden (x2)	(France) Suzanne Lenglen (x5)	(United Kingdom) Randolph Lycett (United Kingdom) Max Woosnam	(France) Suzanne Lenglen (United States) Elizabeth Ryan (x5)	(United Kingdom) Randolph Lycett (United States) Elizabeth Ryan
1922	(Australia) Gerald Patterson	(France) Suzanne Lenglen (x5)	(Australia) James Anderson (United Kingdom) Randolph Lycett	(France) Suzanne Lenglen (United States) Elizabeth Ryan (x5)	(Australia) Pat O'Hara Wood (France) Suzanne Lenglen
1923	(United States) William Johnston	(France) Suzanne Lenglen (x5)	(United Kingdom) Leslie Godfree (United Kingdom) Randolph Lycett	(France) Suzanne Lenglen (United States) Elizabeth Ryan (x5)	(United Kingdom) Randolph Lycett (United States) Elizabeth Ryan
1924	(France) Jean Borotra	(United Kingdom) Kathleen McKane Godfree	(United States) Francis Hunter (United States) Vincent Richards	(United States) Hazel Wightman (United States) Helen Wills	(United Kingdom) Brian Gilbert (United Kingdom) Kitty McKane
1925	(France) René Lacoste	(France) Suzanne Lenglen	(France) Jean Borotra (France) René Lacoste	(France) Suzanne Lenglen (United States) Elizabeth Ryan	(France) Jean Borotra (France) Suzanne Lenglen
1926	(France) Jean Borotra	(United Kingdom) Kathleen McKane Godfree	(France) Jacques Brugnon (France) Henri Cochet	(United States) Mary Browne (United States) Elizabeth Ryan	(United Kingdom) Leslie Godfree (United Kingdom) Kitty McKane Godfree
1927	(France) Henri Cochet	(United States) Helen Wills Moody (x4)	(United States) Francis Hunter (United States) Bill Tilden	(United States) Elizabeth Ryan (United States) Helen Wills	(United States) Francis Hunter (United States) Elizabeth Ryan
1928	(France) René Lacoste	(United States) Helen Wills Moody (x4)	(France) Jacques Brugnon (France) Henri Cochet	(United Kingdom) Peggy Saunders (United Kingdom) Phoebe Watson	(South Africa) Pat Spence (United States) Elizabeth Ryan
1929	(France) Henri Cochet	(United States) Helen Wills Moody (x4)	(United States) Wilmer Allison (United States) John Van Ryn (x2)	(United Kingdom) Peggy Michell (United Kingdom) Phoebe Watson	(United States) Francis Hunter (United States) Helen Moody
1930	(United States) Bill Tilden	(United States) Helen Wills Moody (x4)	(United States) Wilmer Allison (United States) John Van Ryn (x2)	(United States) Helen Wills Moody (United States) Elizabeth Ryan	(Australia) Jack Crawford (United States) Elizabeth Ryan
1931	(United States) Sidney Wood	(Weimar Republic) Cilly Aussem	(United States) George Lott (United States) John Van Ryn	(United Kingdom) Dorothy Shepherd-Barron (United Kingdom) Phyllis Mudford	(United States) George Lott (United States) Anna Harper
1932	(United States) Ellsworth Vines	(United States) Helen Wills Moody (x2)	(France) Jean Borotra (France) Jacques Brugnon (x2)	(France) Doris Metaxa (Belgium) Josane Sigart	(Spain) Enrique Maier (United States) Elizabeth Ryan
1933	(Australia) Jack Crawford	(United States) Helen Wills Moody (x2)	(France) Jean Borotra (France) Jacques Brugnon (x2)	(France) Simonne Mathieu (United States) Elizabeth Ryan (x2)	(Germany) Gottfried von Cramm (Germany) Hilde Krahwinkel
1934	(United Kingdom) Fred Perry (x3)	(United Kingdom) Dorothy Round	(United States) George Lott (United States) Lester Stoefen	(France) Simonne Mathieu (United States) Elizabeth Ryan (x2)	(Japan) Ryuki Miki (United Kingdom) Dorothy Round
1935	(United Kingdom) Fred Perry (x3)	(United States) Helen Wills Moody	(Australia) Jack Crawford (Australia) Adrian Quist	(United Kingdom) Freda James (United Kingdom) Kay Stammers (x2)	(United Kingdom) Fred Perry (United Kingdom) Dorothy Round (x2)
1936	(United Kingdom) Fred Perry (x3)	(United States) Helen Jacobs	(United Kingdom) Pat Hughes (United Kingdom) Raymond Tuckey	(United Kingdom) Freda James (United Kingdom) Kay Stammers (x2)	(United Kingdom) Fred Perry (United Kingdom) Dorothy Round (x2)
1937	(United States) Don Budge (x2)	(United Kingdom) Dorothy Round	(United States) Don Budge (United States) Gene Mako (x2)	(France) Simonne Mathieu (United Kingdom) Billie Yorke	(United States) Don Budge (United States) Alice Marble (x2)
1938	(United States) Don Budge (x2)	(United States) Helen Wills Moody	(United States) Don Budge (United States) Gene Mako (x2)	(United States) Sarah Fabyan (United States) Alice Marble (x2)	(United States) Don Budge (United States) Alice Marble (x2)
1939	(United States) Bobby Riggs	(United States) Alice Marble	(United States) Elwood Cooke (United States) Bobby Riggs	(United States) Sarah Fabyan (United States) Alice Marble (x2)	(United States) Bobby Riggs (United States) Alice Marble
1940	No tournament due to World War II				
1941	No tournament due to World War II				
1942	No tournament due to World War II				
1943	No tournament due to World War II				
1944	No tournament due to World War II				
1945	No tournament due to World War II				
1946	(France) Yvon Petra	(United States) Pauline Betz	(United States) Tom Brown (United States) Jack Kramer	(United States) Louise Brough (United States) Margaret Osborne	(United States) Tom Brown (United States) Louise Brough
1947	(United States) Jack Kramer	(United States) Margaret Osborne duPont	(United States) Bob Falkenburg (United States) Jack Kramer	(United States) Doris Hart (United States) Patricia Canning Todd	(Australia) John Bromwich (United States) Louise Brough (x2)
1948	(United States) Bob Falkenburg	(United States) Louise Brough (x3)	(Australia) John Bromwich (Australia) Frank Sedgman	(United States) Louise Brough (United States) Margaret Osborne duPont (x3)	(Australia) John Bromwich (United States) Louise Brough (x2)
1949	(United States) Ted Schroeder	(United States) Louise Brough (x3)	(United States) Pancho Gonzales (United States) Frank Parker	(United States) Louise Brough (United States) Margaret Osborne duPont (x3)	(South Africa) Eric Sturgess (South Africa) Sheila Summers
1950	(United States) Budge Patty	(United States) Louise Brough (x3)	(Australia) John Bromwich (Australia) Adrian Quist	(United States) Louise Brough (United States) Margaret Osborne duPont (x3)	(South Africa) Eric Sturgess (United States) Louise Brough
1951	(United States) Richard Savitt	(United States) Doris Hart	(Australia) Ken McGregor (Australia) Frank Sedgman (x2)	(United States) Shirley Fry (United States) Doris Hart (x3)	(Australia) Frank Sedgman (United States) Doris Hart (x2)
1952	(Australia) Frank Sedgman	(United States) Maureen Connolly (x3)	(Australia) Ken McGregor (Australia) Frank Sedgman (x2)	(United States) Shirley Fry (United States) Doris Hart (x3)	(Australia) Frank Sedgman (United States) Doris Hart (x2)
1953	(United States) Vic Seixas	(United States) Maureen Connolly (x3)	(Australia) Lew Hoad (Australia) Ken Rosewall	(United States) Shirley Fry (United States) Doris Hart (x3)	(United States) Vic Seixas (United States) Doris Hart (x3)
1954	(Egypt) Jaroslav Drobný	(United States) Maureen Connolly (x3)	(Australia) Rex Hartwig (Australia) Mervyn Rose	(United States) Louise Brough (United States) Margaret duPont	(United States) Vic Seixas (United States) Doris Hart (x3)
1955	(United States) Tony Trabert	(United States) Louise Brough	(Australia) Rex Hartwig (Australia) Lew Hoad	(United Kingdom) Angela Mortimer (United Kingdom) Anne Shilcock	(United States) Vic Seixas (United States) Doris Hart (x3)
1956	(Australia) Lew Hoad (x2)	(United States) Shirley Fry	(Australia) Lew Hoad (Australia) Ken Rosewall	(United Kingdom) Angela Buxton (United States) Althea Gibson	(United States) Vic Seixas (United States) Shirley Fry
1957	(Australia) Lew Hoad (x2)	(United States) Althea Gibson (x2)	(United States) Gardnar Mulloy (United States) Budge Patty	(United States) Althea Gibson (United States) Darlene Hard	(Australia) Mervyn Rose (United States) Darlene Hard
1958	(Australia) Ashley Cooper	(United States) Althea Gibson (x2)	(Sweden) Sven Davidson (Sweden) Ulf Schmidt	(Brazil) Maria Bueno (United States) Althea Gibson	(Australia) Bob Howe (Australia) Lorraine Coghlan
1959	(United States) Alex Olmedo	(Brazil) Maria Bueno (x2)	(Australia) Roy Emerson (Australia) Neale Fraser	(United States) Jeanne Arth (United States) Darlene Hard	(Australia) Rod Laver (United States) Darlene Hard (x2)
1960	(Australia) Neale Fraser	(Brazil) Maria Bueno (x2)	(Mexico) Rafael Osuna (United States) Dennis Ralston	(Brazil) Maria Bueno (United States) Darlene Hard	(Australia) Rod Laver (United States) Darlene Hard (x2)
1961	(Australia) Rod Laver (x2)	(United Kingdom) Angela Mortimer	(Australia) Roy Emerson (Australia) Neale Fraser	(United States) Karen Hantze (United States) Billie Jean Moffitt (x2)	(Australia) Fred Stolle (Australia) Lesley Turner Bowrey
1962	(Australia) Rod Laver (x2)	(United States) Karen Hantze Susman	(Australia) Bob Hewitt (Australia) Fred Stolle	(United States) Karen Hantze (United States) Billie Jean Moffitt (x2)	(Australia) Neale Fraser (United States) Margaret duPont
1963	(United States) Chuck McKinley	(Australia) Margaret Smith Court	(Mexico) Rafael Osuna (Mexico) Antonio Palafox	(Brazil) Maria Bueno (United States) Darlene Hard	(Australia) Ken Fletcher (Australia) Margaret Court
1964	(Australia) Roy Emerson (x2)	(Brazil) Maria Bueno	(Australia) Bob Hewitt (Australia) Fred Stolle	(Australia) Margaret Smith (Australia) Lesley Turner Bowrey	(Australia) Fred Stolle (Australia) Lesley Turner
1965	(Australia) Roy Emerson (x2)	(Australia) Margaret Smith Court	(Australia) John Newcombe (Australia) Tony Roche	(Brazil) Maria Bueno (United States) Billie Jean Moffitt	(Australia) Ken Fletcher (Australia) Margaret Court (x2)
1966	(Spain) Manuel Santana	(United States) Billie Jean Moffitt King (x2)	(Australia) Ken Fletcher (Australia) John Newcombe	(Brazil) Maria Bueno (United States) Nancy Richey	(Australia) Ken Fletcher (Australia) Margaret Court (x2)
1967	(Australia) John Newcombe	(United States) Billie Jean Moffitt King (x2)	(South Africa) Bob Hewitt (South Africa) Frew McMillan	(United States) Rosemary Casals (United States) Billie Jean King	(Australia) Owen Davidson (United States) Billie Jean King
1968	↓ Open Era ↓				
1968	(Australia) Rod Laver (x2)	(United States) Billie Jean King	(Australia) John Newcombe (Australia) Tony Roche (x3)	(United States) Rosemary Casals (United States) Billie Jean King	(Australia) Margaret Court (Australia) Ken Rosewall
1969	(Australia) Rod Laver (x2)	(United Kingdom) Ann Haydon-Jones	(Australia) John Newcombe (Australia) Tony Roche (x3)	(Australia) Margaret Court (Australia) Judy Tegart	(United Kingdom) Ann Haydon-Jones (Australia) Fred Stolle
1970	(Australia) John Newcombe (x2)	(Australia) Margaret Court	(Australia) John Newcombe (Australia) Tony Roche (x3)	(United States) Rosemary Casals (United States) Billie Jean King (x2)	(United States) Rosemary Casals (Romania) Ilie Năstase
1971	(Australia) John Newcombe (x2)	(Australia) Evonne Goolagong	(Australia) Roy Emerson (Australia) Rod Laver	(United States) Rosemary Casals (United States) Billie Jean King (x2)	(United States) Billie Jean King (Australia) Owen Davidson
1972	(United States) Stan Smith	(United States) Billie Jean King (x2)	(South Africa) Bob Hewitt (South Africa) Frew McMillan	(United States) Billie Jean King (Netherlands) Betty Stöve	(United States) Rosemary Casals (Romania) Ilie Năstase
1973	(Czechoslovakia) Jan Kodeš	(United States) Billie Jean King (x2)	(United States) Jimmy Connors (Romania) Ilie Năstase	(United States) Rosemary Casals (United States) Billie Jean King	(United States) Billie Jean King (Australia) Owen Davidson (x2)
1974	(United States) Jimmy Connors	(United States) Chris Evert	(Australia) John Newcombe (Australia) Tony Roche	(Australia) Evonne Goolagong (United States) Peggy Michel	(United States) Billie Jean King (Australia) Owen Davidson (x2)
1975	(United States) Arthur Ashe	(United States) Billie Jean King	(United States) Vitas Gerulaitis (United States) Sandy Mayer	(United States) Ann Kiyomura (Japan) Kazuko Sawamatsu	(Australia) Margaret Court (United States) Marty Riessen
1976	(Sweden) Björn Borg (x5)	(United States) Chris Evert	(United States) Brian Gottfried (Mexico) Raúl Ramírez	(United States) Chris Evert (United States) Martina Navratilova	(France) Françoise Dürr (Australia) Tony Roche
1977	(Sweden) Björn Borg (x5)	(United Kingdom) Virginia Wade	(Australia) Ross Case (Australia) Geoff Masters	(Australia) Helen Gourlay Cawley (United States) JoAnne Russell	(South Africa) Greer Stevens (South Africa) Bob Hewitt
1978	(Sweden) Björn Borg (x5)	(United States) Martina Navratilova (x2)	(South Africa) Bob Hewitt (South Africa) Frew McMillan	(Australia) Kerry Melville Reid (Australia) Wendy Turnbull	(Netherlands) Betty Stöve (South Africa) Frew McMillan
1979	(Sweden) Björn Borg (x5)	(United States) Martina Navratilova (x2)	(United States) Peter Fleming (United States) John McEnroe	(United States) Billie Jean King (United States) Martina Navratilova	(South Africa) Greer Stevens (South Africa) Bob Hewitt
1980	(Sweden) Björn Borg (x5)	(Australia) Evonne Goolagong Cawley	(Australia) Peter McNamara (Australia) Paul McNamee	(United States) Kathy Jordan (United States) Anne Smith	(United States) Tracy Austin (United States) John Austin
1981	(United States) John McEnroe	(United States) Chris Evert	(United States) Peter Fleming (United States) John McEnroe	(United States) Martina Navratilova (United States) Pam Shriver (x4)	(Netherlands) Betty Stöve (South Africa) Frew McMillan
1982	(United States) Jimmy Connors	(United States) Martina Navratilova (x6)	(Australia) Peter McNamara (Australia) Paul McNamee	(United States) Martina Navratilova (United States) Pam Shriver (x4)	(United States) Anne Smith (South Africa) Kevin Curren
1983	(United States) John McEnroe (x2)	(United States) Martina Navratilova (x6)	(United States) Peter Fleming (United States) John McEnroe (x2)	(United States) Martina Navratilova (United States) Pam Shriver (x4)	(Australia) Wendy Turnbull (United Kingdom) John Lloyd (x2)
1984	(United States) John McEnroe (x2)	(United States) Martina Navratilova (x6)	(United States) Peter Fleming (United States) John McEnroe (x2)	(United States) Martina Navratilova (United States) Pam Shriver (x4)	(Australia) Wendy Turnbull (United Kingdom) John Lloyd (x2)
1985	(West Germany) Boris Becker (x2)	(United States) Martina Navratilova (x6)	(Switzerland) Heinz Günthardt (Hungary) Balázs Taróczy	(United States) Kathy Jordan (Australia) Elizabeth Smylie	(United States) Martina Navratilova (Australia) Paul McNamee
1986	(West Germany) Boris Becker (x2)	(United States) Martina Navratilova (x6)	(Sweden) Joakim Nyström (Sweden) Mats Wilander	(United States) Martina Navratilova (United States) Pam Shriver	(United States) Kathy Jordan (United States) Ken Flach
1987	(Australia) Pat Cash	(United States) Martina Navratilova (x6)	(United States) Ken Flach (United States) Robert Seguso (x2)	(West Germany) Claudia Kohde-Kilsch (Czechoslovakia) Helena Suková	(United Kingdom) Jo Durie (United Kingdom) Jeremy Bates
1988	(Sweden) Stefan Edberg	(West Germany) Steffi Graf (x2)	(United States) Ken Flach (United States) Robert Seguso (x2)	(West Germany) Steffi Graf (Argentina) Gabriela Sabatini	(United States) Zina Garrison (United States) Sherwood Stewart
1989	(West Germany) Boris Becker	(West Germany) Steffi Graf (x2)	(Australia) John Fitzgerald (Sweden) Anders Järryd	(Czechoslovakia) Jana Novotná (Czechoslovakia) Helena Suková (x2)	(Czechoslovakia) Jana Novotná (United States) Jim Pugh
1990	(Sweden) Stefan Edberg	(United States) Martina Navratilova	(United States) Rick Leach (United States) Jim Pugh	(Czechoslovakia) Jana Novotná (Czechoslovakia) Helena Suková (x2)	(United States) Rick Leach (United States) Zina Garrison
1991	(Germany) Michael Stich	(Germany) Steffi Graf (x3)	(Australia) John Fitzgerald (Sweden) Anders Järryd	(Soviet Union) Larisa Savchenko Neiland (Soviet Union) Natasha Zvereva	(Australia) Elizabeth Sayers Smylie (Australia) John Fitzgerald
1992	(United States) Andre Agassi	(Germany) Steffi Graf (x3)	(United States) John McEnroe (Germany) Michael Stich	(United States) Gigi Fernández (Commonwealth of Independent States) / (Belarus) Natasha Zvereva (x3)	(Latvia) Larisa Savchenko Neiland (Czechoslovakia) Cyril Suk
1993	(United States) Pete Sampras (x3)	(Germany) Steffi Graf (x3)	(Australia) Todd Woodbridge (Australia) Mark Woodforde (x5)	(United States) Gigi Fernández (Commonwealth of Independent States) / (Belarus) Natasha Zvereva (x3)	(United States) Martina Navratilova (Australia) Mark Woodforde
1994	(United States) Pete Sampras (x3)	(Spain) Conchita Martínez	(Australia) Todd Woodbridge (Australia) Mark Woodforde (x5)	(United States) Gigi Fernández (Commonwealth of Independent States) / (Belarus) Natasha Zvereva (x3)	(Czech Republic) Helena Suková (Australia) Todd Woodbridge
1995	(United States) Pete Sampras (x3)	(Germany) Steffi Graf (x2)	(Australia) Todd Woodbridge (Australia) Mark Woodforde (x5)	(Czech Republic) Jana Novotná (Spain) Arantxa Sánchez Vicario	(United States) Martina Navratilova (United States) Jonathan Stark
1996	(Netherlands) Richard Krajicek	(Germany) Steffi Graf (x2)	(Australia) Todd Woodbridge (Australia) Mark Woodforde (x5)	(Switzerland) Martina Hingis (Czech Republic) Helena Suková	(Czech Republic) Helena Suková (Czech Republic) Cyril Suk (x2)
1997	(United States) Pete Sampras (x4)	(Switzerland) Martina Hingis	(Australia) Todd Woodbridge (Australia) Mark Woodforde (x5)	(United States) Gigi Fernández (Belarus) Natasha Zvereva	(Czech Republic) Helena Suková (Czech Republic) Cyril Suk (x2)
1998	(United States) Pete Sampras (x4)	(Czech Republic) Jana Novotná	(Netherlands) Jacco Eltingh (Netherlands) Paul Haarhuis	(Switzerland) Martina Hingis (Czech Republic) Jana Novotná	(United States) Serena Williams (Belarus) Max Mirnyi
1999	(United States) Pete Sampras (x4)	(United States) Lindsay Davenport	(India) Mahesh Bhupathi (India) Leander Paes	(United States) Lindsay Davenport (United States) Corina Morariu	(United States) Lisa Raymond (India) Leander Paes
2000	(United States) Pete Sampras (x4)	(United States) Venus Williams (x2)	(Australia) Todd Woodbridge (Australia) Mark Woodforde	(United States) Serena Williams (United States) Venus Williams	(United States) Kimberly Po (United States) Donald Johnson
2001	(Croatia) Goran Ivanišević	(United States) Venus Williams (x2)	(United States) Donald Johnson (United States) Jared Palmer	(United States) Lisa Raymond (Australia) Rennae Stubbs	(Slovakia) Daniela Hantuchová (Czech Republic) Leoš Friedl
2002	(Australia) Lleyton Hewitt	(United States) Serena Williams (x2)	(Sweden) Jonas Björkman (Australia) Todd Woodbridge (x3)	(United States) Serena Williams (United States) Venus Williams	(Russia) Elena Likhovtseva (India) Mahesh Bhupathi
2003	(Switzerland) Roger Federer (x5)	(United States) Serena Williams (x2)	(Sweden) Jonas Björkman (Australia) Todd Woodbridge (x3)	(Belgium) Kim Clijsters (Japan) Ai Sugiyama	(United States) Martina Navratilova (India) Leander Paes
2004	(Switzerland) Roger Federer (x5)	(Russia) Maria Sharapova	(Sweden) Jonas Björkman (Australia) Todd Woodbridge (x3)	(Zimbabwe) Cara Black (Australia) Rennae Stubbs	(Zimbabwe) Cara Black (Zimbabwe) Wayne Black
2005	(Switzerland) Roger Federer (x5)	(United States) Venus Williams	(Australia) Stephen Huss (South Africa) Wesley Moodie	(Zimbabwe) Cara Black (South Africa) Liezel Huber	(France) Mary Pierce (India) Mahesh Bhupathi
2006	(Switzerland) Roger Federer (x5)	(France) Amélie Mauresmo	(United States) Bob Bryan (United States) Mike Bryan	(China) Yan Zi (China) Zheng Jie	(Russia) Vera Zvonareva (Israel) Andy Ram
2007	(Switzerland) Roger Federer (x5)	(United States) Venus Williams (x2)	(France) Arnaud Clément (France) Michaël Llodra	(Zimbabwe) Cara Black (South Africa) Liezel Huber	(Serbia) Jelena Janković (United Kingdom) Jamie Murray
2008	(Spain) Rafael Nadal	(United States) Venus Williams (x2)	(Canada) Daniel Nestor (Serbia) Nenad Zimonjić (x2)	(United States) Serena Williams (United States) Venus Williams (x2)	(Australia) Samantha Stosur (United States) Bob Bryan
2009	(Switzerland) Roger Federer	(United States) Serena Williams (x2)	(Canada) Daniel Nestor (Serbia) Nenad Zimonjić (x2)	(United States) Serena Williams (United States) Venus Williams (x2)	(Germany) Anna-Lena Grönefeld (The Bahamas) Mark Knowles
2010	(Spain) Rafael Nadal	(United States) Serena Williams (x2)	(Austria) Jürgen Melzer (Germany) Philipp Petzschner	(United States) Vania King (Kazakhstan) Yaroslava Shvedova	(Zimbabwe) Cara Black (India) Leander Paes
2011	(Serbia) Novak Djokovic	(Czech Republic) Petra Kvitová	(United States) Bob Bryan (United States) Mike Bryan	(Czech Republic) Květa Peschke (Slovenia) Katarina Srebotnik	(Czech Republic) Iveta Benešová (Austria) Jürgen Melzer
2012	(Switzerland) Roger Federer	(United States) Serena Williams	(United Kingdom) Jonathan Marray (Denmark) Frederik Nielsen	(United States) Serena Williams (United States) Venus Williams	(United States) Lisa Raymond (United States) Mike Bryan
2013	(United Kingdom) Andy Murray	(France) Marion Bartoli	(United States) Bob Bryan (United States) Mike Bryan	(Chinese Taipei) Hsieh Su-wei (China) Peng Shuai	(France) Kristina Mladenovic (Canada) Daniel Nestor
2014	(Serbia) Novak Djokovic (x2)	(Czech Republic) Petra Kvitová	(Canada) Vasek Pospisil (United States) Jack Sock	(Italy) Sara Errani (Italy) Roberta Vinci	(Australia) Samantha Stosur (Serbia) Nenad Zimonjić
2015	(Serbia) Novak Djokovic (x2)	(United States) Serena Williams (x2)	(Netherlands) Jean-Julien Rojer (Romania) Horia Tecău	(Switzerland) Martina Hingis (India) Sania Mirza	(Switzerland) Martina Hingis (India) Leander Paes
2016	(United Kingdom) Andy Murray	(United States) Serena Williams (x2)	(France) Pierre-Hugues Herbert (France) Nicolas Mahut	(United States) Serena Williams (United States) Venus Williams	(United Kingdom) Heather Watson (Finland) Henri Kontinen
2017	(Switzerland) Roger Federer	(Spain) Garbiñe Muguruza	(Poland) Łukasz Kubot (Brazil) Marcelo Melo	(Russia) Ekaterina Makarova (Russia) Elena Vesnina	(Switzerland) Martina Hingis (United Kingdom) Jamie Murray
2018	(Serbia) Novak Djokovic (x2)	(Germany) Angelique Kerber	(United States) Mike Bryan (United States) Jack Sock	(Czech Republic) Barbora Krejčíková (Czech Republic) Kateřina Siniaková	(United States) Nicole Melichar (Austria) Alexander Peya
2019	(Serbia) Novak Djokovic (x2)	(Romania) Simona Halep	(Colombia) Juan Sebastián Cabal (Colombia) Robert Farah	(Chinese Taipei) Hsieh Su-wei (Czech Republic) Barbora Strýcová	(Chinese Taipei) Latisha Chan (Croatia) Ivan Dodig
2020	No tournament due to the COVID-19 pandemic				
2021	(Serbia) Novak Djokovic (x2)	(Australia) Ashleigh Barty	(Croatia) Nikola Mektić (Croatia) Mate Pavić	(Chinese Taipei) Hsieh Su-wei (Belgium) Elise Mertens	(United States) Desirae Krawczyk (United Kingdom) Neal Skupski (x2)
2022	(Serbia) Novak Djokovic (x2)	(Kazakhstan) Elena Rybakina	(Australia) Matthew Ebden (Australia) Max Purcell	(Czech Republic) Barbora Krejčíková (Czech Republic) Kateřina Siniaková	(United States) Desirae Krawczyk (United Kingdom) Neal Skupski (x2)
2023	(Spain) Carlos Alcaraz (x2)	(Czech Republic) Markéta Vondroušová	(Netherlands) Wesley Koolhof (United Kingdom) Neal Skupski	(Chinese Taipei) Hsieh Su-wei (Czech Republic) Barbora Strýcová	(Ukraine) Lyudmyla Kichenok (Croatia) Mate Pavić
2024	(Spain) Carlos Alcaraz (x2)	(Czech Republic) Barbora Krejčíková	(Finland) Harri Heliövaara (United Kingdom) Henry Patten	(Czech Republic) Kateřina Siniaková (United States) Taylor Townsend	(Chinese Taipei) Hsieh Su-wei (Poland) Jan Zieliński
2025	(Italy) Jannik Sinner (x2)	(Poland) Iga Świątek	(United Kingdom) Julian Cash (United Kingdom) Lloyd Glasspool	Veronika Kudermetova (Note: On 1 March 2022, the WTA announced that players from Russia will not be allowed to compete under the name or flag of Russia following the 2022 Russian invasion of Ukraine. Veronika Kudermetova thus competed as neutral player since then and her title is not attributed to Russia.) (Belgium) Elise Mertens	(Czech Republic) Kateřina Siniaková (Netherlands) Sem Verbeek
2026	(Italy) Jannik Sinner (x2)	(Czech Republic) Linda Nosková	(Finland) Harri Heliövaara (United Kingdom) Henry Patten	(China) Guo Hanyu (France) Kristina Mladenovic	(Latvia) Jeļena Ostapenko (El Salvador) Marcelo Arévalo

=== Wheelchair ===
Year	Singles			Doubles		
Year	Men	Women	Quad	Men	Women	Quad
2005	No competition	No competition	No competition	(France) Michaël Jérémiasz (United Kingdom) Jayant Mistry	No competition	No competition
2006	No competition	No competition	No competition	(Japan) Satoshi Saida (Japan) Shingo Kunieda	No competition	No competition
2007	No competition	No competition	No competition	(Netherlands) Robin Ammerlaan (Netherlands) Ronald Vink (x2)	No competition	No competition
2008	No competition	No competition	No competition	(Netherlands) Robin Ammerlaan (Netherlands) Ronald Vink (x2)	No competition	No competition
2009	No competition	No competition	No competition	(France) Stéphane Houdet (France) Michaël Jeremiasz	(Netherlands) Korie Homan (Netherlands) Esther Vergeer	No competition
2010	No competition	No competition	No competition	(Netherlands) Robin Ammerlaan (Sweden) Stefan Olsson	(Netherlands) Esther Vergeer (Netherlands) Sharon Walraven (x2)	No competition
2011	No competition	No competition	No competition	(Netherlands) Maikel Scheffers (Netherlands) Ronald Vink	(Netherlands) Esther Vergeer (Netherlands) Sharon Walraven (x2)	No competition
2012	No competition	No competition	No competition	(Netherlands) Tom Egberink (France) Michaël Jeremiasz	(Netherlands) Jiske Griffioen (Netherlands) Aniek van Koot (x2)	No competition
2013	No competition	No competition	No competition	(France) Stéphane Houdet (Japan) Shingo Kunieda (x2)	(Netherlands) Jiske Griffioen (Netherlands) Aniek van Koot (x2)	No competition
2014	No competition	No competition	No competition	(France) Stéphane Houdet (Japan) Shingo Kunieda (x2)	(Japan) Yui Kamiji (United Kingdom) Jordanne Whiley (x4)	No competition
2015	No competition	No competition	No competition	(Argentina) Gustavo Fernández (France) Nicolas Peifer	(Japan) Yui Kamiji (United Kingdom) Jordanne Whiley (x4)	No competition
2016	(United Kingdom) Gordon Reid	(Netherlands) Jiske Griffioen	No competition	(United Kingdom) Alfie Hewett (United Kingdom) Gordon Reid (x3)	(Japan) Yui Kamiji (United Kingdom) Jordanne Whiley (x4)	No competition
2017	(Sweden) Stefan Olsson (x2)	(Netherlands) Diede de Groot (x2)	No competition	(United Kingdom) Alfie Hewett (United Kingdom) Gordon Reid (x3)	(Japan) Yui Kamiji (United Kingdom) Jordanne Whiley (x4)	No competition
2018	(Sweden) Stefan Olsson (x2)	(Netherlands) Diede de Groot (x2)	No competition	(United Kingdom) Alfie Hewett (United Kingdom) Gordon Reid (x3)	(Netherlands) Diede de Groot (Japan) Yui Kamiji	Exhibition match
2019	(Argentina) Gustavo Fernández	(Netherlands) Aniek van Koot	(Australia) Dylan Alcott	(Belgium) Joachim Gérard (Sweden) Stefan Olsson	(Netherlands) Diede de Groot (Netherlands) Aniek van Koot	(Australia) Dylan Alcott (United Kingdom) Andy Lapthorne
2020	No tournament due to the COVID-19 pandemic					
2021	(Belgium) Joachim Gérard	(Netherlands) Diede de Groot (x4)	(Australia) Dylan Alcott	(United Kingdom) Alfie Hewett (United Kingdom) Gordon Reid	(Japan) Yui Kamiji (United Kingdom) Jordanne Whiley	(United Kingdom) Andy Lapthorne (United States) David Wagner
2022	(Japan) Shingo Kunieda	(Netherlands) Diede de Groot (x4)	(Netherlands) Sam Schröder	(Argentina) Gustavo Fernández (Japan) Shingo Kunieda	(Japan) Yui Kamiji (United States) Dana Mathewson	(Netherlands) Sam Schröder (Netherlands) Niels Vink (x3)
2023	(Japan) Tokito Oda	(Netherlands) Diede de Groot (x4)	(Netherlands) Niels Vink (x4)	(United Kingdom) Alfie Hewett (United Kingdom) Gordon Reid (x2)	(Netherlands) Diede de Groot (Netherlands) Jiske Griffioen	(Netherlands) Sam Schröder (Netherlands) Niels Vink (x3)
2024	(United Kingdom) Alfie Hewett	(Netherlands) Diede de Groot (x4)	(Netherlands) Niels Vink (x4)	(United Kingdom) Alfie Hewett (United Kingdom) Gordon Reid (x2)	(Japan) Yui Kamiji (South Africa) Kgothatso Montjane	(Netherlands) Sam Schröder (Netherlands) Niels Vink (x3)
2025	(Japan) Tokito Oda (x2)	(China) Wang Ziying	(Netherlands) Niels Vink (x4)	(Spain) Martín de la Puente (Netherlands) Ruben Spaargaren	(China) Li Xiaohui (China) Wang Ziying	(Israel) Guy Sasson (Netherlands) Niels Vink (x2)
2026	(Japan) Tokito Oda (x2)	(Japan) Yui Kamiji	(Netherlands) Niels Vink (x4)	(United Kingdom) Alfie Hewett (United Kingdom) Gordon Reid	(Japan) Yui Kamiji (China) Zhu Zhenzhen	(Israel) Guy Sasson (Netherlands) Niels Vink (x2)

=== Junior ===
Year	Singles		Doubles	
Year	Boys	Girls	Boys	Girls
1947	(Denmark) Kurt Nielsen	(Belgium) Genevieve Domken	No competition	No competition
1948	(Sweden) Staffan Stockenberg	(Czechoslovakia) Olga Mišková	No competition	No competition
1949	(Sweden) Staffan Stockenberg	(Belgium) Christiane Mercelis	No competition	No competition
1950	(United Kingdom) John Horn	(United Kingdom) Lorna Cornell	No competition	No competition
1951	(South Africa) Johann Kupferburger	(United Kingdom) Lorna Cornell	No competition	No competition
1952	(United Kingdom) Bobby Wilson	(Netherlands) Fenny ten Bosch	No competition	No competition
1953	(United Kingdom) Billy Knight	(South Africa) Dora Kilan	No competition	No competition
1954	(India) Ramanathan Krishnan	(United Kingdom) Valerie Pitt	No competition	No competition
1955	(United Kingdom) Mike Hann	(United Kingdom) Sheila Armstrong	No competition	No competition
1956	(United States) Ronald Holmberg	(United Kingdom) Ann Haydon-Jones ‡	No competition	No competition
1957	(United Kingdom) Jimmy Tattersall	(United States) Miriam Arnold	No competition	No competition
1958	(United States) Butch Buchholz	(United States) Sally Moore	No competition	No competition
1959	(Soviet Union) Toomas Leius	(South Africa) Joan Cross	No competition	No competition
1960	(South Africa) Rodney Mandelstam	(United States) Karen Hantze ‡	No competition	No competition
1961	(United States) Clark Graebner	(Soviet Union) Galina Baksheeva	No competition	No competition
1962	(United Kingdom) Stanley Matthews	(Soviet Union) Galina Baksheeva	No competition	No competition
1963	(Greece) Nicky Kalogeropoulos	(France) Monique Salfati	No competition	No competition
1964	(Egypt) Ismail El Shafei	(United States) Peaches Bartkowicz	No competition	No competition
1965	(Soviet Union) Vladimir Korotkov	(Soviet Union) Olga Morozova	No competition	No competition
1966	(Soviet Union) Vladimir Korotkov	(Finland) Birgitta Lindström	No competition	No competition
1967	(Spain) Manuel Orantes	(Netherlands) Judith Salomé	No competition	No competition
1968	(Australia) John Alexander	(United States) Kristy Pigeon	No competition	No competition
1969	(South Africa) Byron Bertram (x2)	(Japan) Kazuko Sawamatsu	No competition	No competition
1970	(South Africa) Byron Bertram (x2)	(United States) Sharon Walsh	No competition	No competition
1971	(United States) Robert Kreiss	(Soviet Union) Marina Kroschina	No competition	No competition
1972	(Sweden) Björn Borg ‡	(South Africa) Ilana Kloss	No competition	No competition
1973	(United States) Billy Martin (x2)	(United States) Ann Kiyomura	No competition	No competition
1974	(United States) Billy Martin (x2)	(Socialist Federal Republic of Yugoslavia) Mima Jaušovec	No competition	No competition
1975	(New Zealand) Chris Lewis†	(Soviet Union) Natasha Chmyreva (x2)	No competition	No competition
1976	(Switzerland) Heinz Günthardt	(Soviet Union) Natasha Chmyreva (x2)	No competition	No competition
1977	(United States) Van Winitsky	(United States) Lea Antonoplis	No competition	No competition
1978	(Czechoslovakia) Ivan Lendl †	(United States) Tracy Austin	No competition	No competition
1979	(India) Ramesh Krishnan	(United States) Mary Lou Piatek	No competition	No competition
1980	(France) Thierry Tulasne	(Australia) Debbie Freeman	No competition	No competition
1981	(United States) Matt Anger	(United States) Zina Garrison †	No competition	No competition
1982	(Australia) Pat Cash ‡	(France) Catherine Tanvier	(Australia) Pat Cash † (Australia) John Frawley	(United States) Penny Barg (United States) Beth Herr
1983	(Sweden) Stefan Edberg ‡	(France) Pascale Paradis	(Australia) Mark Kratzmann (Australia) Simon Youl	(United States) Patty Fendick (Hong Kong) Patricia Hy
1984	(Australia) Mark Kratzmann	(United Kingdom) Annabel Croft	(United States) Ricky Brown (United States) Robbie Weiss	(United States) Caroline Kuhlman (United States) Stephanie Rehe
1985	(Mexico) Leonardo Lavalle	(Czechoslovakia) Andrea Holíková	(Mexico) Agustín Moreno (Peru) Jaime Yzaga	(Australia) Louise Field (Australia) Janine Thompson
1986	(Mexico) Eduardo Vélez	(Soviet Union) Natasha Zvereva (x2)	(Spain) Tomás Carbonell (Czechoslovakia) Petr Korda	(Australia) Michelle Jaggard (Australia) Lisa O'Neill
1987	(Italy) Diego Nargiso	(Soviet Union) Natasha Zvereva (x2)	(Australia) Jason Stoltenberg (Australia) Todd Woodbridge ‡ (x2)	(Soviet Union) Natalia Medvedeva (Soviet Union) Natasha Zvereva ‡
1988	(Venezuela) Nicolás Pereira	(Netherlands) Brenda Schultz	(Australia) Jason Stoltenberg (Australia) Todd Woodbridge ‡ (x2)	(Australia) Jo-Anne Faull (Australia) Rachel McQuillan
1989	(Sweden) Nicklas Kulti	(Czech Republic) Andrea Strnadová (x2)	(United States) Jared Palmer ‡ (United States) Jonathan Stark	(United States) Jennifer Capriati (United States) Meredith McGrath †
1990	(India) Leander Paes	(Czech Republic) Andrea Strnadová (x2)	(Canada) Sébastien Lareau (Canada) Sébastien Leblanc	(Czechoslovakia) Karina Habšudová (Czechoslovakia) Andrea Strnadová
1991	(Sweden) Thomas Enqvist	(Germany) Barbara Rittner	(Morocco) Karim Alami (Canada) Greg Rusedski	(Australia) Catherine Barclay (Israel) Limor Zaltz
1992	(Czechoslovakia) David Škoch	(United States) Chanda Rubin	(Australia) Steven Baldas (Australia) Scott Draper	(Australia) Maija Avotins (Australia) Lisa McShea
1993	(Romania) Răzvan Sabău	(Belgium) Nancy Feber	(New Zealand) Steven Downs (New Zealand) James Greenhalgh	(Belgium) Laurence Courtois (Belgium) Nancy Feber
1994	(United States) Scott Humphries	(Switzerland) Martina Hingis ‡	(Australia) Ben Ellwood (Australia) Mark Philippoussis	(South Africa) Esmé de Villiers (United Kingdom) Elizabeth Jelfs
1995	(France) Olivier Mutis	(Poland) Aleksandra Olsza	(United Kingdom) Martin Lee (United Kingdom) James Trotman	(Zimbabwe) Cara Black ‡ (Poland) Aleksandra Olsza
1996	(Belarus) Vladimir Voltchkov	(France) Amélie Mauresmo ‡	(Italy) Daniele Bracciali (Canada) Jocelyn Robichaud	(Belarus) Olga Barabanschikova (France) Amélie Mauresmo
1997	(South Africa) Wesley Whitehouse	(Zimbabwe) Cara Black	(Peru) Luis Horna (Chile) Nicolás Massú	(Zimbabwe) Cara Black ‡ (Kazakhstan) Irina Selyutina
1998	(Switzerland) Roger Federer ‡	(Slovenia) Katarina Srebotnik	(Switzerland) Roger Federer (Belgium) Olivier Rochus	(Denmark) Eva Dyrberg (Croatia) Jelena Kostanić
1999	(Austria) Jürgen Melzer	(Uzbekistan) Iroda Tulyaganova	(Argentina) Guillermo Coria (Argentina) David Nalbandian	(Czech Republic) Dája Bedáňová (Argentina) María Emilia Salerni
2000	(France) Nicolas Mahut	(Argentina) María Salerni	(Belgium) Dominique Coene (Belgium) Kristof Vliegen	(Romania) Ioana Gașpar (Ukraine) Tatiana Perebiynis
2001	(Switzerland) Roman Valent	(Indonesia) Angelique Widjaja	(Canada) Frank Dancevic (Ecuador) Giovanni Lapentti	(Argentina) Gisela Dulko (United States) Ashley Harkleroad
2002	(Australia) Todd Reid	(Russia) Vera Dushevina	(Romania) Florin Mergea (Romania) Horia Tecău ‡ (x2)	(Belgium) Elke Clijsters (Czech Republic) Barbora Strýcová ‡
2003	(Romania) Florin Mergea	(Belgium) Kirsten Flipkens	(Romania) Florin Mergea (Romania) Horia Tecău ‡ (x2)	(Russia) Alisa Kleybanova (India) Sania Mirza ‡
2004	(France) Gaël Monfils	(Ukraine) Kateryna Bondarenko	(United States) Brendan Evans (United States) Scott Oudsema	(Belarus) Victoria Azarenka (Belarus) Olga Govortsova
2005	(France) Jérémy Chardy	(Poland) Agnieszka Radwańska †	(United States) Jesse Levine (United States) Michael Shabaz	(Belarus) Victoria Azarenka (Hungary) Ágnes Szávay
2006	(Netherlands) Thiemo de Bakker	(Denmark) Caroline Wozniacki	(United States) Kellen Damico (United States) Nathaniel Schnugg	(Russia) Alisa Kleybanova (Russia) Anastasia Pavlyuchenkova
2007	(United States) Donald Young	(Poland) Urszula Radwańska	(Paraguay) Daniel Alejandro López (Italy) Matteo Trevisan	(Russia) Anastasia Pavlyuchenkova (Poland) Urszula Radwańska
2008	(Bulgaria) Grigor Dimitrov	(United Kingdom) Laura Robson	(Chinese Taipei) Hsieh Cheng-peng (Chinese Taipei) Yang Tsung-hua	(Slovenia) Polona Hercog (Australia) Jessica Moore
2009	(Russia) Andrey Kuznetsov	(Thailand) Noppawan Lertcheewakarn	(France) Pierre-Hugues Herbert ‡ (Germany) Kevin Krawietz	(Thailand) Noppawan Lertcheewakarn (Australia) Sally Peers
2010	(Hungary) Márton Fucsovics	(Czech Republic) Kristýna Plíšková	(United Kingdom) Liam Broady (United Kingdom) Tom Farquharson	(Hungary) Tímea Babos † (United States) Sloane Stephens
2011	(Australia) Luke Saville	(Australia) Ashleigh Barty ‡	(United Kingdom) George Morgan (Croatia) Mate Pavić ‡	(Canada) Eugenie Bouchard (United States) Grace Min
2012	(Canada) Filip Peliwo	(Canada) Eugenie Bouchard †	(Australia) Andrew Harris (Australia) Nick Kyrgios	(Canada) Eugenie Bouchard (United States) Taylor Townsend ‡
2013	(Italy) Gianluigi Quinzi	(Switzerland) Belinda Bencic	(Australia) Thanasi Kokkinakis (Australia) Nick Kyrgios	(Czech Republic) Barbora Krejčíková ‡ (Czech Republic) Kateřina Siniaková ‡
2014	(United States) Noah Rubin	(Latvia) Jeļena Ostapenko	(Brazil) Orlando Luz (Brazil) Marcelo Zormann	(Indonesia) Tami Grende (China) Ye Qiuyu
2015	(United States) Reilly Opelka	(Russia) Sofya Zhuk	(Vietnam) Lý Hoàng Nam (India) Sumit Nagal	(Hungary) Dalma Gálfi (Hungary) Fanny Stollár
2016	(Canada) Denis Shapovalov	(Russia) Anastasia Potapova	(Estonia) Kenneth Raisma (Greece) Stefanos Tsitsipas	(United States) Usue Maitane Arconada (United States) Claire Liu
2017	(Spain) Alejandro Davidovich Fokina	(United States) Claire Liu	(Argentina) Axel Geller (Chinese Taipei) Hsu Yu-hsiou	(Serbia) Olga Danilović (Slovenia) Kaja Juvan
2018	(Chinese Taipei) Tseng Chun-hsin	(Poland) Iga Świątek ‡	(Turkey) Yankı Erel (Finland) Otto Virtanen	(China) Wang Xinyu (China) Wang Xiyu
2019	(Japan) Shintaro Mochizuki	(Ukraine) Daria Snigur	(Czech Republic) Jonáš Forejtek (Czech Republic) Jiří Lehečka	(United States) Savannah Broadus (United States) Abigail Forbes
2020	No tournament due to the COVID-19 pandemic			
2021	(United States) Samir Banerjee	(Spain) Ane Mintegi del Olmo	(Lithuania) Edas Butvilas (Spain) Alejandro Manzanera Pertusa	(Belarus) Kristina Dmitruk (Russia) Diana Shnaider
2022	(Croatia) Mili Poljičak	(United States) Liv Hovde	(United States) Sebastian Gorzny (United States) Alex Michelsen	(Netherlands) Rose Marie Nijkamp (Kenya) Angella Okutoyi
2023	(United Kingdom) Henry Searle	(United States) Clervie Ngounoue	(Czech Republic) Jakub Filip (Italy) Gabriele Vulpitta	(Czech Republic) Alena Kovačková (Czech Republic) Laura Samsonová
2024	(Norway) Nicolai Budkov Kjær	(Slovakia) Renáta Jamrichová	(United States) Alexander Razeghi (Germany) Max Schönhaus	(United States) Tyra Caterina Grant (United States) Iva Jovic
2025	(Bulgaria) Ivan Ivanov	(Slovakia) Mia Pohánková	(Finland) Oskari Paldanius (Poland) Alan Ważny	(United States) Kristina Penickova (Czech Republic) Vendula Valdmannová
2026	(United States) Jordan Lee	Anna Pushkareva	(Brazil) Luís Guto Miguel (Slovenia) Žiga Šeško	(Czech Republic) Jana Kovačková (Czech Republic) Kateřina Zajíčková

‡ = a player who won both the junior and senior title.
† = a player who won the junior title and reached the senior final.

=== Junior 14&U ===
Year	Singles	
Year	Boys	Girls
2022	(South Korea) Cho Se-hyuk	(Romania) Alexia Ioana Tatu
2023	(United Kingdom) Mark Ceban	(Serbia) Luna Vujović
2024	(Japan) Takahiro Kawaguchi	(Czech Republic) Jana Kovačková
2025	(Austria) Moritz Freitag	(Japan) Sakino Miyazawa
2026	(Switzerland) Jonas Wälti	(United States) Isha Manchala

== See also ==
Lists of champions of specific events

- List of Wimbledon gentlemen's singles champions
- List of Wimbledon ladies' singles champions
- List of Wimbledon gentlemen's doubles champions
- List of Wimbledon ladies' doubles champions
- List of Wimbledon mixed doubles champions

Other Grand Slam tournament champions

- List of Australian Open champions
- List of French Open champions
- List of US Open champions
