= 1886 in tennis =

This page covers all the important events in the sport of tennis in 1886. It provides the results of notable tournaments throughout the year on both the men's and women's ILTF tennis circuits.

== Australian Open ==
No event.

== French Open ==
Not a Grand Slam event.

== Wimbledon ==
Category	Champion(s)	Finalist(s)	Score
Men's singles	(United Kingdom) William Renshaw	(United Kingdom) Herbert Lawford	6–0, 5–7, 6–3, 6–4
Women's singles	(United Kingdom) Blanche Bingley	(United Kingdom) Maud Watson	6–3, 6–3
Men's doubles	(United Kingdom) Ernest Renshaw (United Kingdom) William Renshaw	(United Kingdom) Claude Farrer (United Kingdom) Arthur Stanley	6–3, 6–3, 4–6, 7–5

== US Open ==
Category	Champion(s)	Finalist(s)	Score
Singles	(United States) Richard D. Sears	(United States) R. Livingston Beeckman	4–6, 6–1, 6–3, 6–4
Doubles	(United States) Richard D. Sears (United States) James Dwight	(United States) Howard Taylor (United States) Godfrey Brinley	7–5, 6–8, (Note: Collins has the score 5–7.) 7–5, 6–4
