= 1885 in tennis =

This page covers all the important events in the sport of tennis in 1885. It provides the results of notable tournaments throughout the year on both the men's and women's ILTF tennis circuits.

== Australian Open ==
No event.

== French Open ==
Not a Grand Slam event.

== Wimbledon ==
Category	Champion(s)	Finalist(s)	Score
Men's singles	(United Kingdom) William Renshaw	(United Kingdom) Herbert Lawford	7–5, 6–2, 4–6, 7–5
Women's singles	(United Kingdom) Maud Watson	(United Kingdom) Blanche Bingley	6–1, 7–5
Men's doubles	(United Kingdom) Ernest Renshaw (United Kingdom) William Renshaw	(United Kingdom) Claude Farrer (United Kingdom) Arthur Stanley	6–3, 6–3, 10–8

== US Open ==
Category	Champion(s)	Finalist(s)	Score
Singles	(United States) Richard D. Sears	(United States) Godfrey M. Brinley	6–3, 4–6, 6–0, 6–3
Doubles	(United States) Richard D. Sears (United States) Joseph Clark	(United States) Henry Slocum (United States) Percy Knapp	6–3, 6–0, 6–2
