= Wilfred Milne (tennis) =

English tennis player (born 1857)

- Country (sports): GBR
- Born: March 1857 Chertsey, Surrey, England
- Died: June 1919 (age 62) Mutford, Suffolk, England
- Turned pro: 1881 (amateur tour)
- Retired: 1903

Singles
- Career record: 53–33
- Career titles: 3

Grand Slam singles results
- Wimbledon: QF (1884, 1887)

Grand Slam doubles results
- Wimbledon: SF (1886, 1891)

Wilfred Milne (March 1857 – June 1919) was an English tennis player. He was twice a singles quarter finalist at the Wimbledon Championships in 1884 and 1887, and twice a doubles semi-finalist in 1886 and 1891. He was active from 1881 to 1903 and won 3 career singles titles.

== Tennis career ==
Wilfred Milne was born in Chertsey, Surrey, England in March 1857. In 1881 he played and won first event at St George's Hill Open in Weybridge, Surrey. He competed at the Wimbledon Championships in 13 editions between 1881 and 1900. He had an impressive record at the Championships.

In the gentleman's singles he took part in seven consecutive tournaments where his best results were reaching the quarter finals stage in 1884 where he lost to Ernest Renshaw, and in 1887 where he lost to Charles Lacy Sweet.

In the gentleman's doubles he took part in nine tournaments between 1884 and 1900. He was a five time quarter finalist in 1884, 1887, 1888 1892 and 1898. In addition he was a twice semi-finalist in 1886 partnering with Charles Hoadley Ashe Ross when they lost to Patrick Bowes-Lyon and Herbert Wilberforce, and in 1891 when he partnered with Arthur Stanley where they lost to Harry S. Barlow and Ernest Renshaw.

His other career singles highlights include winning the Teignmouth and Shaldon Open in 1885 and the Houndiscombe Open in 1888, that was held in the grounds of Houndiscombe House at Plymouth. He was also a losing finalist at the West of England Championships in 1883 to Ernest Brown, the Torquay Open in 1887 where he lost to Ernest Wool Lewis, the West of England Championships in 1889 where he lost to James Baldwin, the Torquay Open in 1890 when he was beaten by Edward James Avory. He was also a losing semi-finalist at the North of England Championships in 1891. Milne played his final singles event at the Teignmouth Open in 1903 after which he retired.

Wilfred Milne died in June 1919 at Mutford, Suffolk, England age 62.

== Career finals ==
=== Singles:8 (3 titles, 5 runners-up) ===
Category + (Titles)
Major (0)
National (0)
Regional (0)
County (0)
Regular (3)

Titles by Surface
Clay – Outdoor (0)
Grass – Outdoor (3)
Hard – Outdoor (0)
Wood – Indoor (0)

Outcome	No.	Date	Tournament	Location	Surface	Opponent	Score
Winner	1.	1881	St George's Hill Open	Weybridge	Grass	(United Kingdom) B. Hawes	3 sets to 0
Runner-up	1.	1883	West of England Championships	Bristol	Grass	(Ireland) Ernest Browne	3–6, 2–6, 3–6
Winner	2.	1884	Teignmouth & Shaldon Open	Teignmouth	Grass	(United Kingdom) H.C. Kent	6–3, 6–5, 6–2
Runner-up	2.	1887	Torquay Open	Torquay	Grass	(United Kingdom) Ernest Wool Lewis	5–7, 2–6, 5–7
Runner-up	3.	1887	Teignmouth & Shaldon Open	Teignmouth	Grass	(United Kingdom) Ernest Wool Lewis	3–6, 6–1, 2–6, 3–6
Winner	3.	1888	Houndiscombe Open	Plymouth	Grass	(United Kingdom) C.R. Broad	6–1, 6–0
Runner-up	4.	1889	West of England Championships	Bristol	Grass	(United Kingdom) James Baldwin	5–7, 4–6, 4–6
Runner-up	5.	1890	Torquay Open	Torquay	Grass	(United Kingdom) Edward James Avory	3–6, 3–6

== Family ==
Wilfred was the twin brother of Oswald Milne also a lawn tennis player.
