= 1885 Wimbledon Championships =

- Date: 4 – 17 July
- Edition: 9th
- Category: Grand Slam
- Surface: Grass
- Location: Worple Road; SW19, Wimbledon, London, United Kingdom
- Venue: All England Lawn Tennis Club

Champions

Men's singles
- (United Kingdom) William Renshaw

Women's singles
- (United Kingdom) Maud Watson

Men's doubles
- (United Kingdom) Ernest Renshaw / (United Kingdom) William Renshaw
- Wimbledon Championships

The 1885 Wimbledon Championships took place on the outdoor grass courts at the All England Lawn Tennis Club in Wimbledon, London, United Kingdom. The tournament ran from 4 July until 17 July. It was the 9th staging of the Wimbledon Championships, and the first Grand Slam tennis event of 1885. There was a change in the draw method, to use the Bagnall Wild system, in which all byes were restricted to the opening round, instead of being distributed through all the rounds until the final. There were 3500 spectators for the Challenge Round.

== Champions ==
=== Men's singles ===
(United Kingdom) William Renshaw defeated (United Kingdom) Herbert Lawford, 7–5, 6–2, 4–6, 7–5

=== Women's singles ===
(United Kingdom) Maud Watson defeated (United Kingdom) Blanche Bingley, 6–1, 7–5

=== Men's doubles ===
(United Kingdom) Ernest Renshaw / (United Kingdom) William Renshaw defeated (United Kingdom) Claude Farrer / (United Kingdom) Arthur Stanley, 6–3, 6–3, 10–8

| Preceded by 1884 U.S. National Championships | Grand Slams | Succeeded by 1885 U.S. National Championships |
