= 1886 Wimbledon Championships =

- Date: 3 – 17 July
- Edition: 10th
- Category: Grand Slam
- Surface: Grass
- Location: Worple Road; SW19, Wimbledon, London, United Kingdom
- Venue: All England Lawn Tennis Club

Champions

Men's singles
- (United Kingdom) William Renshaw

Women's singles
- (United Kingdom) Blanche Bingley

Men's doubles
- (United Kingdom) Ernest Renshaw / (United Kingdom) William Renshaw
- Wimbledon Championships

The 1886 Wimbledon Championships took place on the outdoor grass courts at the All England Lawn Tennis Club in Wimbledon, London, United Kingdom. The tournament ran from 3 July until 17 July. It was the 10th staging of the Wimbledon Championships, and the first Grand Slam tennis event of 1886. Henry Jones retired as referee after nine years, and was replaced by Julian Marshall.

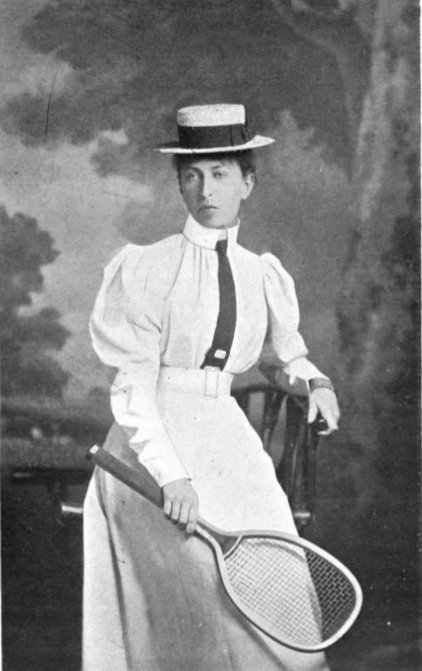
Blanche Bingley

== Champions ==
=== Men's singles ===
(United Kingdom) William Renshaw defeated (United Kingdom) Herbert Lawford, 6–0, 5–7, 6–3, 6–4

=== Women's singles ===
(United Kingdom) Blanche Bingley defeated (United Kingdom) Maud Watson, 6–3, 6–3

=== Men's doubles ===
(United Kingdom) Ernest Renshaw / (United Kingdom) William Renshaw defeated (United Kingdom) Claude Farrer / (United Kingdom) Arthur Stanley, 6–3, 6–3, 4–6, 7–5

Preceded by 1885 U.S. National Championships	Grand Slams	Succeeded by 1886 U.S. National Championships
