= 1886 Wimbledon Championships – Men's singles =

Men's singles
- 1886 Wimbledon Championships

Final
- Champion: (United Kingdom) William Renshaw
- Runner-up: (United Kingdom) Herbert Lawford
- Score: 6–0, 5–7, 6–3, 6–4

Details
- Draw: 23
- Seeds: –

Events
Singles	men	women
Doubles	men	women
- Wimbledon Championships

Herbert Lawford defeated Ernest Lewis 6–2, 6–3, 2–6, 4–6, 6–4 in the All Comers' Final, but the reigning champion William Renshaw defeated Lawford 6–0, 5–7, 6–3, 6–4 in the challenge round to win the gentlemen's singles tennis title at the 1886 Wimbledon Championships for a record sixth consecutive year.

== Draw ==
Key

- Q = Qualifier
- WC = Wild card
- LL = Lucky loser
- Alt = Alternate
- ITF = ITF entry
- PR = Protected ranking
- SR = Special ranking
- SE = Special exempt
- JE = Junior exempt
- JR = Junior Accelerator Programme entrant
- CO = College Accelerator Programme entrant
- NG = Next Gen Accelerator Program entrant
- w/o = Walkover
- r = Retired
- d = Defaulted

=== Challenge round ===
Challenge Round
(United Kingdom) Herbert Lawford	0	7	3	4
(United Kingdom) William Renshaw	6	5	6	6

=== All comers' finals ===
Semifinals
(United Kingdom) Herbert Lawford	6	6	6
(United Kingdom) Toler Garvey	3	2	0
(United Kingdom) Ernest Lewis	3	6	1	6	6
(United Kingdom) Herbert Wilberforce	6	2	6	1	3

Final
(United Kingdom) Herbert Lawford	6	6	2	4	6
(United Kingdom) Ernest Lewis	2	3	6	6	4

=== Top half ===
First round
(United Kingdom) Edward Avory	6	6	6
(United Kingdom) Claude Farrer	3	2	2
(United Kingdom) Toler Garvey	6	6	2	6
(United Kingdom) Howard Pease	3	3	6	1
(United Kingdom) Wilfred Milne
(United Kingdom) Eyre Chatterton	w/o
(United Kingdom) William Taylor	6	4	6	6
(United Kingdom) AR Lewis	3	6	3	4

Second round
(United Kingdom) Willoughby Hamilton	7	6	8
(United Kingdom) Ernest Meers	5	4	6
(United Kingdom) Herbert Lawford	0	6	4	6	6
(United Kingdom) Harry Grove	6	0	6	4	2
(United Kingdom) E Avory	4	6	4	3
(United Kingdom) T Garvey	6	1	6	6
(United Kingdom) W Milne	6	5	6	3	0
(United Kingdom) W Taylor	4	7	3	6	6

Quarterfinals
(United Kingdom) W Hamilton	6	1	6
(United Kingdom) H Lawford	8	6	8
(United Kingdom) T Garvey	8	6	2	6
(United Kingdom) W Taylor	6	4	6	3

Semifinals
(United Kingdom) H Lawford	6	6	6
(United Kingdom) T Garvey	3	2	0

=== Bottom half ===
First round
(United Kingdom) MG MacNamara
(United Kingdom) JH Lewis	w/o
(United Kingdom) Ernest Renshaw	6	6	11	6
(United Kingdom) Herbert Chipp	1	3	13	3
(United Kingdom) Ernest Lewis	6	6	6
(United Kingdom) GP Triscott	0	1	2

Second round
(United Kingdom) MG MacNamara	6	3	6	0
(United Kingdom) E Renshaw	4	6	8	6
(United Kingdom) E Lewis	3	6	6	6
(United Kingdom) HS Stone	6	0	0	3
(United Kingdom) Charles Ross	6	6	6
(United Kingdom) Oswald Milne	3	3	3
(United Kingdom) Patrick Bowes-Lyon	6	4	0^{r}
(United Kingdom) Herbert Wilberforce	8	6	3

Quarterfinals
(United Kingdom) E Renshaw	6	7	4	1	0
(United Kingdom) E Lewis	4	5	6	6	6
(United Kingdom) C Ross	6	6	4	2	4
(United Kingdom) H Wilberforce	3	2	6	6	6

Semifinals
(United Kingdom) E Lewis	3	6	1	6	6
(United Kingdom) H Wilberforce	6	2	6	1	3

Preceded by 1885 U.S. National Championships	Grand Slams men's singles	Succeeded by 1886 U.S. National Championships
