= 1885 Wimbledon Championships – Men's doubles =

Men's doubles
- 1885 Wimbledon Championships

Final
- Champions: (United Kingdom) Ernest Renshaw (United Kingdom) William Renshaw
- Runners-up: (United Kingdom) Claude Farrer (United Kingdom) Arthur Stanley
- Score: 6–3, 6–3, 10–8

Details
- Draw: 11
- Seeds: –

Events
Singles	men	women
Doubles	men	women
← 1884 ·	Wimbledon Championships	· 1886 →

Ernest Renshaw and William Renshaw defeated Claude Farrer and Arthur Stanley 6–3, 6–3, 10–8 to win the gentlemen's doubles tennis title at the 1885 Wimbledon Championships.

== Draw ==
=== Key ===
- Q = Qualifier
- WC = Wild card
- LL = Lucky loser
- Alt = Alternate
- SE = Special exempt
- PR = Protected ranking
- ITF = ITF entry
- JE = Junior exempt
- w/o = Walkover
- r = Retired
- d = Defaulted
- SR = Special ranking

=== Draw ===
First round
(United Kingdom) Charles Ross (United Kingdom) William Taylor
(United Kingdom) FL Rawson (United Kingdom) Otway Woodhouse	w/o
(United Kingdom) Claude Farrer (United Kingdom) Arthur Stanley	6	6	6
(United Kingdom) A Dunn (United Kingdom) C Liddel	4	4	4
(United Kingdom) Harry Grove (United Kingdom) Donald Stewart	6	6	6
(United Kingdom) Oswald Milne (United Kingdom) EG Watson	0	4	4

Quarterfinals
(United Kingdom) Charles Ross (United Kingdom) William Taylor	6	6	6
(United Kingdom) BA Cohen (United Kingdom) WH Cohen	1	3	3
(United Kingdom) MG MacNamara (United Kingdom) RM Wile	2	6	3	6
(United Kingdom) Claude Farrer (United Kingdom) Arthur Stanley	6	4	6	8
(United Kingdom) Harry Grove (United Kingdom) Donald Stewart	2	8	2	6	1
(United Kingdom) Ernest Renshaw (United Kingdom) William Renshaw	6	6	6	2	6
(United Kingdom) E Barratt-Smith (United Kingdom) Herbert Chipp	3	0	9
(United States) James Dwight (United Kingdom) Ernest Lewis	6	6	11

Semifinals
(United Kingdom) Charles Ross (United Kingdom) William Taylor	3	6	2
(United Kingdom) Claude Farrer (United Kingdom) Arthur Stanley	6	8	6
(United Kingdom) Ernest Renshaw (United Kingdom) William Renshaw	4	6	6	6
(United States) James Dwight (United Kingdom) Ernest Lewis	6	1	4	4

Final
(United Kingdom) Claude Farrer (United Kingdom) Arthur Stanley	3	3	8
(United Kingdom) Ernest Renshaw (United Kingdom) William Renshaw	6	6	10

Preceded by 1884 U.S. National Championships – Doubles	Grand Slam men's doubles	Succeeded by 1885 U.S. National Championships – Doubles
