= Harry Grove =

British tennis player

- Full name: Henry Grove
- Country (sports): United Kingdom
- Born: 7 May 1862 Lambeth, London, United Kingdom
- Died: 7 February 1896 (aged 33) London, United Kingdom
- Turned pro: 1881 (amateur tour)
- Retired: 1896 (due to death)

Singles
- Career record: 110/78 (58.5%)
- Career titles: 10

Grand Slam singles results
- Wimbledon: SF (1887)

Grand Slam doubles results
- Wimbledon: QF (1884, 1885, 1888, 1893)

Harry Grove (7 May 1862 – 7 February 1896) was a British tennis player in the early years of tennis.

== Career ==
Grove first entered the Wimbledon men's singles in 1881, when he lost in round one. Grove reached the semis in 1887, beating Herbert Wilberforce and Herbert Bowes-Lyon before losing to Herbert Lawford in four sets. In June 1886 he won the prestigious Northern Championships, defeating the American player James Dwight in 3 sets and again in 1887. In May 1887 he won the Scottish Championships defeating Patrick Bowes-Lyon in five sets. In 1888 he reached the final of the Scottish Championships for the second successive year where his opponent was Bowes-Lyon. At two sets all and one three down Grove retired. In 1891 at Wimbledon he overcame Ernest Meers before losing to Ernest Renshaw in the quarterfinals. He last entered Wimbledon in 1893, when he lost in the opening round. Grove died aged 33 in 1896.
