= 1888 Wimbledon Championships – Men's doubles =

Men's doubles
- 1888 Wimbledon Championships

Final
- Champions: (United Kingdom) Ernest Renshaw (United Kingdom) William Renshaw
- Runners-up: (United Kingdom) Patrick Bowes-Lyon (United Kingdom) Herbert Wilberforce
- Score: 2–6, 1–6, 6–3, 6–4, 6–3

Details
- Draw: 12
- Seeds: –

Events
| Singles | men | women |
| Doubles | men | women |
- Wimbledon Championships

Ernest Renshaw and William Renshaw defeated Ernest Meers and A. G. Ziffo 6–3, 6–2, 6–2 in the All Comers' Final, and then the reigning champions Patrick Bowes-Lyon and Herbert Wilberforce 2–6, 1–6, 6–3, 6–4, 6–3 in the challenge round to win the gentlemen's doubles tennis title at the 1888 Wimbledon Championships.

== Draw ==
Key

- Q = Qualifier
- WC = Wild card
- LL = Lucky loser
- Alt = Alternate
- ITF = ITF entry
- PR = Protected ranking
- SR = Special ranking
- SE = Special exempt
- JE = Junior exempt
- JR = Junior Accelerator Programme entrant
- CO = College Accelerator Programme entrant
- NG = Next Gen Accelerator Program entrant
- w/o = Walkover
- r = Retired
- d = Defaulted

=== Challenge round ===
| Challenge Round |
| (United Kingdom) Ernest Renshaw (United Kingdom) William Renshaw | 2 | 1 | 6 | 6 | 6 |
| (United Kingdom) Patrick Bowes-Lyon (United Kingdom) Herbert Wilberforce | 6 | 6 | 3 | 4 | 3 |

=== All Comers' ===
First round
(United Kingdom) TS Campion (United Kingdom) Harry Grove | 6 | 6 | 7
(United Kingdom) George Hillyard (United Kingdom) William Taylor | 4 | 2 | 5
(United Kingdom) Ernest Renshaw (United Kingdom) William Renshaw | 7 | 6 | 6
(United Kingdom) Clement Cazalet (United Kingdom) Arthur Stanley | 5 | 4 | 4
(United Kingdom) Harry Barlow (United Kingdom) A Walker | 4 | 6 | 11 | 7
(United Kingdom) Harry Carlton (United Kingdom) Harry Scrivener | 6 | 0 | 9 | 5
(United Kingdom) Ernest Meers (United Kingdom) AG Ziffo | 6 | 7 | 6
(United Kingdom) Arthur Gore (United Kingdom) FW Gore | 4 | 5 | 3

Quarterfinals
(United Kingdom) GED Brown (United Kingdom) P Brown | 6 | 6 | 9
(United Kingdom) Oswald Milne (United Kingdom) Wilfred Milne | 2 | 4 | 7
(United Kingdom) TS Campion (United Kingdom) Harry Grove | 4 | 1 | 6
(United Kingdom) Ernest Renshaw (United Kingdom) William Renshaw | 6 | 6 | 8
(United Kingdom) Harry Barlow (United Kingdom) A Walker | w/o
(United Kingdom) Ernest Meers (United Kingdom) AG Ziffo
(United Kingdom) Herbert Chipp (United Kingdom) Claude Farrer | 6 | 4 | 3 | 7 | 10
(United Kingdom) George Mewburn (United Kingdom) Henry Wilson-Fox | 4 | 6 | 6 | 5 | 8

Semifinals
(United Kingdom) GED Brown (United Kingdom) P Brown | 4 | 6 | 2
(United Kingdom) Ernest Renshaw (United Kingdom) William Renshaw | 6 | 8 | 6
(United Kingdom) Ernest Meers (United Kingdom) AG Ziffo | 6 | 7 | 0
(United Kingdom) Herbert Chipp (United Kingdom) Claude Farrer | 2 | 5 | 1^{r}

Final
(United Kingdom) Ernest Renshaw (United Kingdom) William Renshaw | 6 | 6 | 6
(United Kingdom) Ernest Meers (United Kingdom) AG Ziffo | 3 | 2 | 2
