= 1883 Wimbledon Championship =

- Date: 7 – 16 July
- Edition: 7th
- Category: Grand Slam
- Surface: Grass
- Location: Worple Road; SW19, Wimbledon, London, United Kingdom
- Venue: All England Lawn Tennis Club

Champions

Singles
- (United Kingdom) William Renshaw
- Wimbledon Championship

The 1883 Wimbledon Championships took place on the outdoor grass courts at the All England Lawn Tennis Club in Wimbledon, London, United Kingdom. The tournament ran from 7 July until 16 July. It was the 7th staging of the Wimbledon Championships, and the first Grand Slam tennis event of 1883. William Renshaw won for the third year running, and so won the original Field championship cup outright. The players changed ends at the end of each set, or (if the umpire so ruled) at the end of each game.

== Singles ==
=== Final ===
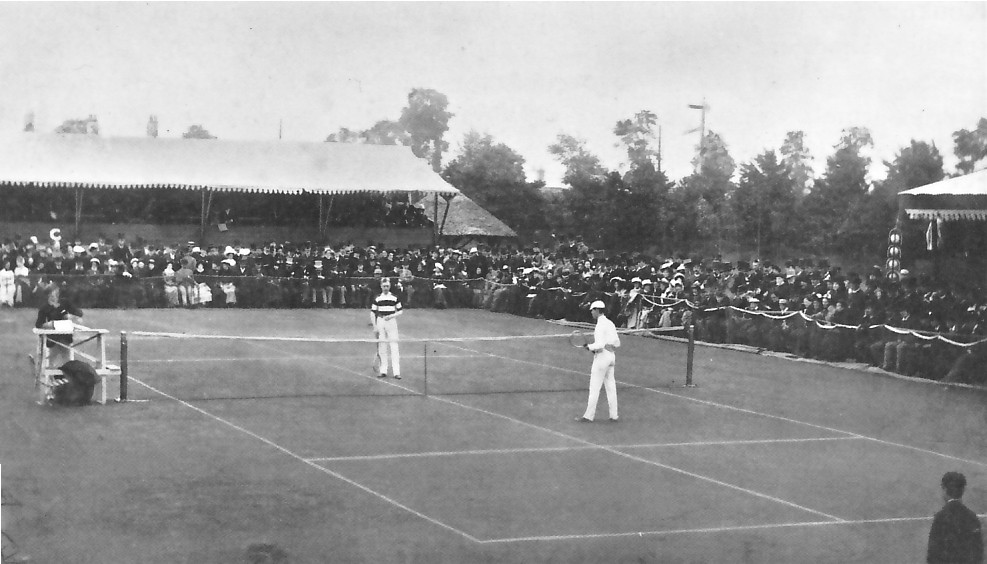
Centre Court in 1883, challenge round between William and Ernest Renshaw

(United Kingdom) William Renshaw defeated (United Kingdom) Ernest Renshaw, 2–6, 6–3, 6–3, 4–6, 6–3

=== All Comers' Final ===
(United Kingdom) Ernest Renshaw defeated (United Kingdom) Donald Stewart, 0–6, 6–3, 6–0, 6–2

Preceded by 1882 U.S. National Championships	Grand Slams	Succeeded by 1883 U.S. National Championships
