= 1884 Wimbledon Championships – Men's doubles =

Men's doubles
- 1884 Wimbledon Championships

Final
- Champions: (United Kingdom) Ernest Renshaw (United Kingdom) William Renshaw
- Runners-up: (United Kingdom) Ernest Lewis (United Kingdom) Teddy Williams
- Score: 6–3, 6–1, 1–6, 6–4

Details
- Draw: 10
- Seeds: –

Events
| Singles | men | women |
| Doubles | men | women |
| Wimbledon Championships | · 1885 → |

Ernest Renshaw and William Renshaw defeated Ernest Lewis and Teddy Williams 6–3, 6–1, 1–6, 6–4 to win the inaugural gentlemen's doubles tennis title at the 1884 Wimbledon Championships.

== Draw ==
=== Key ===
- Q = Qualifier
- WC = Wild card
- LL = Lucky loser
- Alt = Alternate
- SE = Special exempt
- PR = Protected ranking
- ITF = ITF entry
- JE = Junior exempt
- w/o = Walkover
- r = Retired
- d = Defaulted
- SR = Special ranking

=== Draw ===
First round
(United Kingdom) Ernest Renshaw (United Kingdom) William Renshaw | 6 | 6 | 4 | 6
(United Kingdom) Herbert Lawford (United Kingdom) Herbert Wilberforce | 3 | 3 | 6 | 2
(United Kingdom) George Butterworth (United Kingdom) Wilfred Milne | 6 | 6 | 6
(United Kingdom) Capt. Ironsides Box (United Kingdom) FJ Ridgway | 4 | 2 | 3
(United States) James Dwight (United States) Richard Sears | 6 | 6 | 8
(United Kingdom) John Hartley (United Kingdom) Richard Richardson | 2 | 3 | 6
(United Kingdom) Ernest Lewis (United Kingdom) Teddy Williams | 6 | 6 | 9
(United Kingdom) GJ Cooper (United Kingdom) ES Saxton | 2 | 2 | 7
(United Kingdom) Harry Grove (United Kingdom) William Taylor | 6 | 6 | 7
(United Kingdom) B Follett (United Kingdom) Ernest Wigram | 0 | 0 | 5

Quarterfinals
(United Kingdom) Ernest Renshaw (United Kingdom) William Renshaw | 4 | 3 | 7 | 6 | 6
(United Kingdom) George Butterworth (United Kingdom) Wilfred Milne | 6 | 6 | 5 | 2 | 2
(United States) James Dwight (United States) Richard Sears
bye
(United Kingdom) Ernest Lewis (United Kingdom) Teddy Williams | 6 | 6 | 6
(United Kingdom) Harry Grove (United Kingdom) William Taylor | 3 | 4 | 0

Semifinals
(United Kingdom) Ernest Renshaw (United Kingdom) William Renshaw | 6 | 6 | 6
(United States) James Dwight (United States) Richard Sears | 0 | 1 | 2
(United Kingdom) Ernest Lewis (United Kingdom) Teddy Williams
bye

Final
(United Kingdom) Ernest Renshaw (United Kingdom) William Renshaw | 6 | 6 | 1 | 6
(United Kingdom) Ernest Lewis (United Kingdom) Teddy Williams | 3 | 1 | 6 | 4
