= 1886 Wimbledon Championships – Men's doubles =

Men's doubles
- 1886 Wimbledon Championships

Final
- Champions: (United Kingdom) Ernest Renshaw (United Kingdom) William Renshaw
- Runners-up: (United Kingdom) Claude Farrer (United Kingdom) Arthur Stanley
- Score: 6–3, 6–3, 4–6, 7–5

Details
- Draw: 7
- Seeds: –

Events
Singles	men	women
Doubles	men	women
- Wimbledon Championships

Claude Farrer and Arthur Stanley defeated Patrick Bowes-Lyon and Herbert Wilberforce 7–5, 6–3, 6–1 in the All Comers' Final, but the reigning champions Ernest Renshaw and William Renshaw defeated Farrer and Stanley 6–3, 6–3, 4–6, 7–5 in the challenge round to win the gentlemen's doubles tennis title at the 1886 Wimbledon Championships.

== Draw ==
Key

- Q = Qualifier
- WC = Wild card
- LL = Lucky loser
- Alt = Alternate
- ITF = ITF entry
- PR = Protected ranking
- SR = Special ranking
- SE = Special exempt
- JE = Junior exempt
- JR = Junior Accelerator Programme entrant
- CO = College Accelerator Programme entrant
- NG = Next Gen Accelerator Program entrant
- w/o = Walkover
- r = Retired
- d = Defaulted

=== Challenge round ===
Challenge Round
(United Kingdom) Claude Farrer (United Kingdom) Arthur Stanley	3	3	6	5
(United Kingdom) Ernest Renshaw (United Kingdom) William Renshaw	6	6	4	7

=== All comers' finals ===
Quarterfinals
(United Kingdom) Claude Farrer (United Kingdom) Arthur Stanley	6	6	7
(United Kingdom) A Dunn (United Kingdom) C Liddel	1	3	5
(United Kingdom) Herbert Chipp (United Kingdom) Ernest Meers
(United Kingdom) CJ Cramer-Roberts (United Kingdom) HC Crawford	w/o
(United Kingdom) Patrick Bowes-Lyon (United Kingdom) Herbert Wilberforce	5	6	6	3	6
(United Kingdom) MG MacNamara (United Kingdom) William Taylor	7	2	1	6	0

Semifinals
(United Kingdom) Claude Farrer (United Kingdom) Arthur Stanley	6	6	10
(United Kingdom) Herbert Chipp (United Kingdom) Ernest Meers	4	1	8
(United Kingdom) Patrick Bowes-Lyon (United Kingdom) Herbert Wilberforce	7	4	8	6	6
(United Kingdom) Wilfred Milne (United Kingdom) Charles Ross	9	6	6	1	4

Final
(United Kingdom) Claude Farrer (United Kingdom) Arthur Stanley	7	6	6
(United Kingdom) Patrick Bowes-Lyon (United Kingdom) Herbert Wilberforce	5	3	1
