= Herbert Chipp =

English tennis player

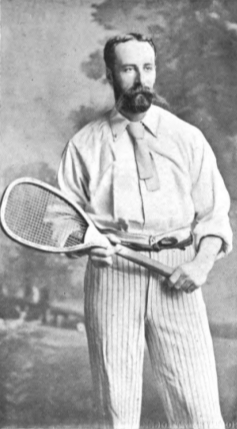
- Country (sports): United Kingdom
- Born: 4 January 1850 Hampstead, England
- Died: 25 August 1903 (aged 53) Ely, Cambridgeshire, England

Singles
- Career record: 78–47
- Career titles: 4

Grand Slam singles results
- Wimbledon: SF (1884)

Doubles

Grand Slam doubles results
- Wimbledon: SF (1886, 1888)

Herbert Chipp (4 January 1850 – 25 August 1903) was an English tennis player. He was a Wimbledon singles and doubles semi finalist and won four career titles. He later became Honorary Secretary of the Lawn Tennis Association.

== Career ==
Chipp played his first tournament in 1881 at the Hamsptead Cricket Club tennis tournament. Chipp participated in the Wimbledon Championships between 1882 and 1900. In 1883 he reached his first tournament final at Redhill losing to Leopold Maxse in 3 sets. In 1884 he reached the semifinals of the all-comers competition, which he lost to Herbert Lawford 5–7, 4–6, 4–6. In 1885 he won the Middlesex Championships defeating Donald Charles Stewart in 3 sets. and then reached the final of Acton Vale tournament before losing to Ernest Wool Lewis. In 1886 he reached the finals of the British Covered Court Championships before losing to Edward Lake Williams 7–5, 7–5, 6–2. He then entered the Kent Championships at Beckenham and won that title against Edward James Avory.

In 1887 he played at the London Championships at Queens Club where he made it to the final losing to Ernest Wool Lewis in three straight sets. In 1887 he failed to defend his Kent Championships title losing in the challenge round to Frederick Bowlby. In 1888 he reached the final of the Torquay Lawn Tennis Club tournament, and lost again to Ernest Lewis in five close sets. He then travelled to Liverpool to take part in the Waterloo Tournament where he reached the challenge round against Jacob Gaitskell Brown, but conceded the title by way of a walkover. He then travelled to Devon and took part in the Teignmouth and Sheldon grass court tournament, and won that title defeating John Redfern Deykin 6-0 6-1 6–0. The same year he entered the prestigious Northern Championships being held in Liverpool, where he reached the all comers final, but was defeated by Irelands Willoughby Hamilton in straight sets, Hamilton would go onto win that event. He then made the final of the Exmouth Open tournament but lost to Ernest Lewis.

He failed to defend his British Covered Court title in 1888 losing to Ernest Meers in five sets. In 1890 he won the Burton-on-Trent Open tournament against George Lowe. In 1891 he entered the London Covered Championships, but exited in the quarter finals to George Hillyard. He then played at the Queens Challenge Cup at Queens Club but lost to Harold Mahony in the quarter finals. He played his final tournament in 1900 at the Wimbledon Championships losing in the second round to Henry Gillibrand E. Evered. In 1898 he published the book Lawn Tennis Recollections, and he contributed parts to J. M. Heathcotes book Tennis; Lawn Tennis, Rackets; Fives. He also was Honorary Secretary of the Lawn Tennis Association.

Chipp died in 1903 at the age of 53.
