= Charles Ross (sportsman) =

English sportsman (1852–1911)

- Full name: Charles Hoadley Ashe Ross
- Country (sports): United Kingdom
- Born: 22 July 1852; Bath, Somerset, England
- Died: 5 February 1911 (Age 59); Hove, East Sussex, England
- Turned pro: 1884 (amateur tour)
- Retired: 1891

Singles
- Career record: 65/32 (67.01%)
- Career titles: 7

Grand Slam singles results
- Wimbledon: QF (1886)

Doubles

Grand Slam doubles results
- Wimbledon: SF (1885, 1886)

Charles Hoadley Ashe Ross (22 July 1852 – 5 February 1911) was an English sportsman who played both cricket and tennis, the latter of which was more extensive. Ross was a quarter–finalist in singles at the 1886 Wimbledon Championships and a two time semi finalist in men's doubles in 1885 and 1886. He played competitive tennis from 1884 to 1891, reached fifteen finals and won seven titles.

== Tennis career ==
Ross entered his first tournament at the Sussex County Lawn Tennis Tournament in 1884 and progressed to the final before losing to Charles Lacy Sweet 3–1 in sets. In a period when international travel was difficult, he chose to play at the inaugural Ceylon Championships held at the Hill Club, in Nuwara Eliya, British Ceylon where he won the title.

In 1885, he competed at the London Championships staged at the London Athletic Club, Stamford Bridge, where he won the title against Ernest Wool Lewis. He then won the Sussex County Lawn Tennis Tournament by a walkover against William Taylor. Ross was also finalist at Brighton Lawn Tennis Club Tournament losing three one in sets to the American No. 2 player James Dwight, he also reached the finals of the very first British Covered Court Championships played on indoor wood courts, before losing to Herbert Lawford. At the Bournemouth Open Tournament he progressed to the final of that event, but lost to Ernest Wool Lewis again in straight sets. He was also a losing finalist at the Cheltenham Championships at Cheltenham to Irelands Ernest Browne.

In 1886, he won the Leicester Lawn Tennis Club Tournament against John Redfern Deykin. At the 1886 Wimbledon Championships he made it to the quarter-finals stage, but was beaten by Herbert Wilberforce. He then won East Grinstead Open against W.E. Seldon. He failed to defend his London championship title to Ernest Wool Lewis who avenged his previous years loss. He then played at the East of England Championships at Felixstowe where he reached the final, but lost to Alfred Penn Gaskell.

In 1888 he won another two titles, and reached the final of another. At the Cambridgeshire Lawn Tennis Tournament he won that title defeating Alfred E. Walker. He then reached the final of Edgbaston Open Tournament, before losing to James Baldwin. His final title win was at the Warwickshire Championships held at Leamington Spa against John Redfern Deykin. The same year he reached the quarter-finals stage of the South of England Championships held at Eastbourne, but was beaten by Harry Sibthorpe Barlow.

In 1890 he reached the semi-finals of the Sussex Championships at Brighton, before losing Herbert Baddeley. Ross played his final tournament at the Colchester Championships in 1891, where he progressed to the semi-finals, before losing to Herbert Kersey.

== Cricket career ==
Charles Ross was also a first class cricketer and played for Middlesex County Cricket Club during the later half of the 19th century.

== Sources ==
- Player Profile: Charles Ross". www.wimbledon.com. All England Lawn Tennis and Croquet Club.
- Silva, Revatha (23 August 2018). "103rd Tennis Nationals – The past champions". The Morning - Sri Lanka News.
