= Claude Farrer =

English tennis player

- Full name: Claude Erskine Farrer
- Country (sports): (United Kingdom)
- Born: 15 September 1864 London, England
- Died: 16 February 1890 (aged 25) Cannes, France

Grand Slam singles results
- Wimbledon: 1R (1882, 1886)

Grand Slam doubles results
- Wimbledon: F (1885, 1886)

Claude Erskine Farrer (15 September 1864 – 16 February 1890) was an English tennis player.

He was the second son and third child of four of Thomas Farrer, 1st Baron Farrer (who was raised to the peerage but only in 1893 after Claude's death, so Claude was not styled "the Honourable"), and his wife Frances Erskine (1825–1870), daughter of the historian and orientalist William Erskine (1773–1852) and his wife Maitland Mackintosh daughter of James Mackintosh by his first wife. His elder sister was Ida Darwin, his elder brother was Thomas Farrer, 2nd Baron Farrer, his younger brother was Noel Farrer, the civil servant.

He was educated at Eton and Trinity College, Cambridge.

He played singles at Wimbledon in 1882 and 1886 but lost in the first round to Ernest Browne (6–0, 6–2, 6–0) in 1882 and Edward J. Avory (6–3, 6–2, 6–2) in 1886. He did better at men's doubles, playing with Arthur Stanley from 1885 to 1887, and Herbert Chipp in 1888. In 1885 Farrer and Stanley reached the final, to lose 6–3, 6–3, 10–8 to the Renshaw brothers, Ernest and William. Along the way they beat A. Dunn and C. Liddel (6–4, 6–4, 6–4) in the first round, Michael G. McNamara and R. M. Wile (6–2, 4–6, 6–3, 8–6) in the quarter-finals, and Charles Ross and William Taylor (6–3, 8–6, 6–2) in the semi-final.

They also reached the challenge round in 1886 (lost 6–3, 6–3, 4–6, 7–5 to the Renshaws) and the quarter finals in 1887 (lost 7–5, 6–2 to Patrick Lyon and Herbert Wilberforce). Farrer reached the semi-final with Chipp in 1888 (losing to Ernest Meers and Andrew Ziffo 6–2, 7–5, 1–0).

He died in 1890, aged only 25.

== Grand Slam finals ==
=== Doubles (2 runner-ups) ===
Result	Year	Tournament	Surface	Partner	Opponents	Score
Loss	1885	Wimbledon	Grass	(United Kingdom) Arthur J. Stanley	(United Kingdom) Ernest Renshaw (United Kingdom) William Renshaw	3–6, 3–6, 8–10
Loss	1886	Wimbledon	Grass	(United Kingdom) Arthur J. Stanley	(United Kingdom) Ernest Renshaw (United Kingdom) William Renshaw	3–6, 3–6, 6–4, 5–7
