= William Renshaw =

British tennis player

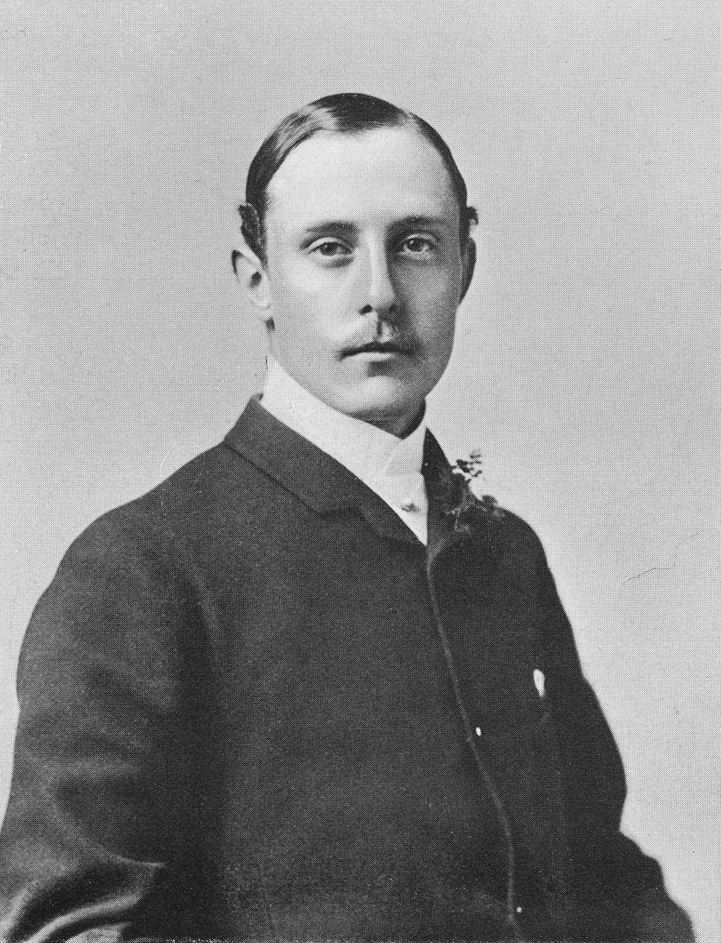
- Full name: William Charles Renshaw
- Country (sports): United Kingdom
- Born: 3 January 1861 Leamington Spa, Warwickshire, England
- Died: 12 August 1904 (aged 43) Swanage, Dorset, England
- Height: 1.77 m (5 ft 9 1/2 in)
- Retired: 1896
- Plays: Right-handed (one-handed backhand)
- Int. Tennis HoF: 1983 (member page)

Singles
- Career record: 98–23
- Career titles: 23
- Highest ranking: No. 1 (1881, ITHF)

Grand Slam singles results
- Wimbledon: W (1881, 1882, 1883, 1884, 1885, 1886, 1889)

Grand Slam doubles results
- Wimbledon: W (1884, 1885, 1886, 1888, 1889)

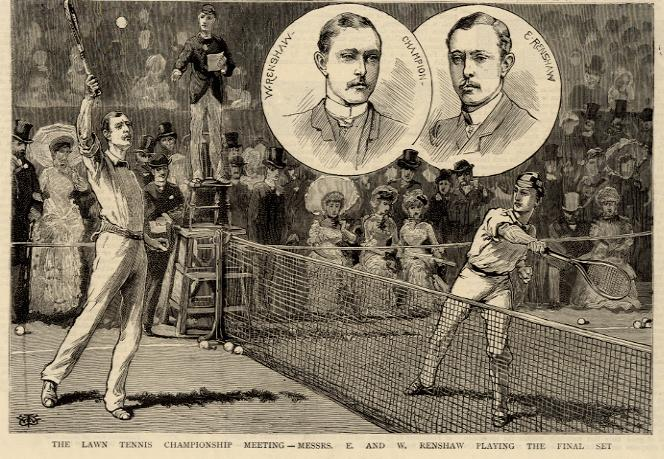
Tennis players William and Ernest Renshaw at Wimbledon, 1882

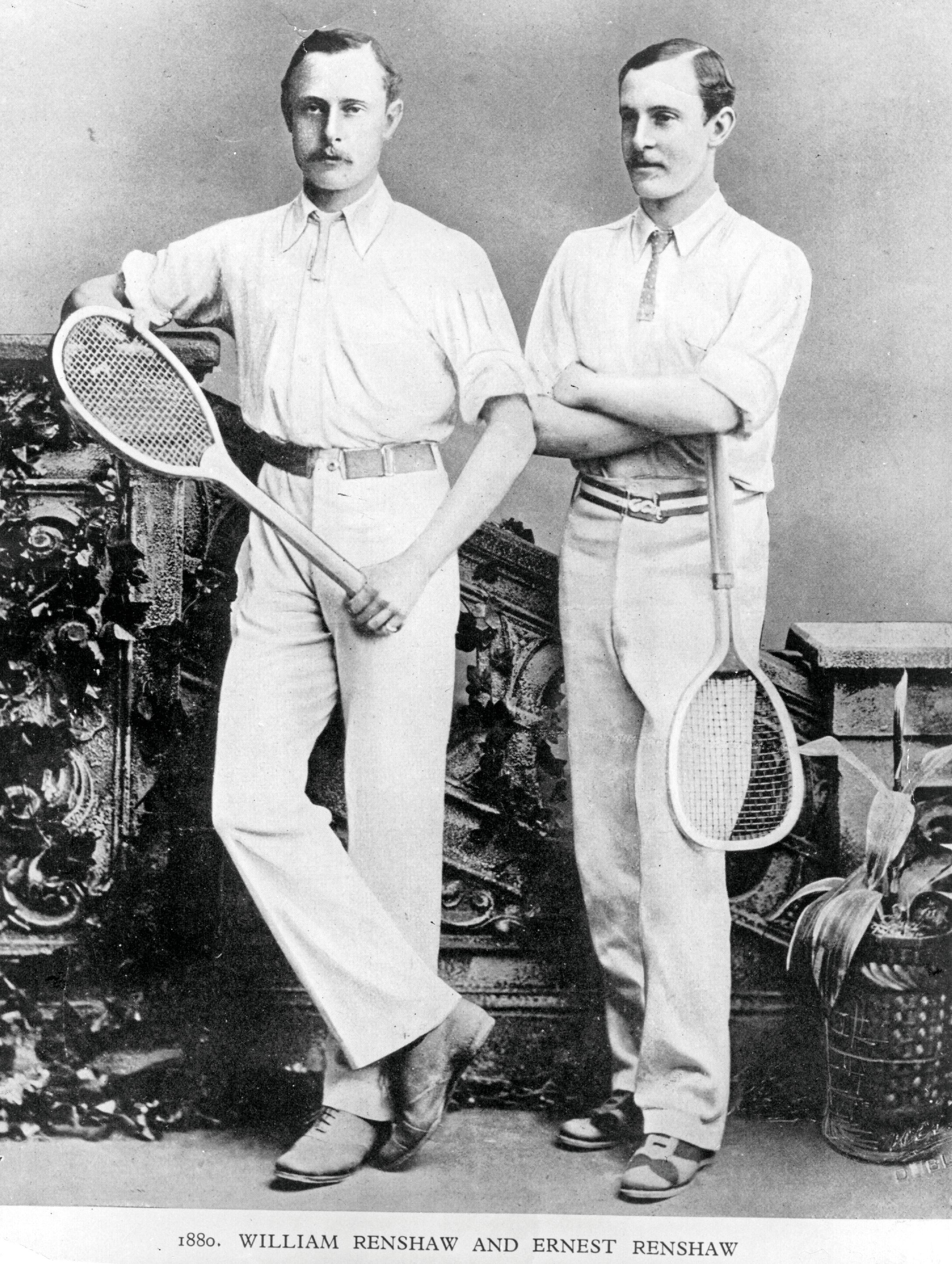
William (L) and Ernest (R) Renshaw

William Charles Renshaw (3 January 1861 – 12 August 1904) was a British tennis player active during the late 19th century, who was ranked world No. 1. He won twelve Wimbledon titles: seven in singles and five in doubles. A right-hander, Renshaw was known for his power and technical ability which put him ahead of competition at the time. His seven Wimbledon men's singles titles were a record that stood for 128 years, until surpassed in 2017 by Roger Federer. His six consecutive singles titles (1881–86) remain an all-time record. Additionally, Renshaw won the doubles title five times with his twin brother Ernest. William Renshaw was the first president of the British Lawn Tennis Association (LTA).

== Career ==
Renshaw won a total of twelve Wimbledon titles. His record of seven singles titles, which Pete Sampras tied in 2000, was surpassed in 2017 when Roger Federer won his eighth title. The first six were consecutive, an achievement which has been unequalled to this day. Since 1922 the reigning champions have had to play in the main draw, making such feats considerably more difficult. In the summer months he would compete in England and Ireland, while competing on the French Riviera during the winter months and practising on a private tennis court he and his brother had built at their own cost. In singles play he played his twin brother Ernest Renshaw three times (1882, 1883 and 1889) in the Wimbledon final, triumphing on all three occasions. He was unable to defend his title in 1887 because of tennis elbow, the first time this injury received public attention, and during his absence took up golf. The other five titles were in the Gentlemen's doubles, partnering with Ernest. Additionally, he and his brother dominated the sport for many years in a time when the only other Grand Slam was the U.S. Championships, and by custom players did not travel far. The rise in popularity of tennis in this period became known as the 'Renshaw Rush'. In 1888 William was elected the first president of the British Lawn Tennis Association (LTA). In 1983, William Renshaw was elected posthumously into the International Tennis Hall of Fame together with his brother.

== Death ==
He died in Swanage, Dorset on 12 August 1904, aged 43, of epileptic convulsions. In 2020, a street in Leamington Spa was named after his brother and him, Renshaw Drive.

== Grand Slam finals ==
=== Singles (7 titles, 1 runner-up) ===
Result	Year	Championship	Surface	Opponent	Score
Win	1881	Wimbledon	Grass	(United Kingdom) John Hartley	6–0, 6–1, 6–1
Win	1882	Wimbledon (2)	Grass	(United Kingdom) Ernest Renshaw	6–1, 2–6, 4–6, 6–2, 6–2
Win	1883	Wimbledon (3)	Grass	(United Kingdom) Ernest Renshaw	2–6, 6–3, 6–3, 4–6, 6–3
Win	1884	Wimbledon (4)	Grass	(United Kingdom) Herbert Lawford	6–0, 6–4, 9–7
Win	1885	Wimbledon (5)	Grass	(United Kingdom) Herbert Lawford	7–5, 6–2, 4–6, 7–5
Win	1886	Wimbledon (6)	Grass	(United Kingdom) Herbert Lawford	6–0, 5–7, 6–3, 6–4
Win	1889	Wimbledon (7)	Grass	(United Kingdom) Ernest Renshaw	6–4, 6–1, 3–6, 6–0
Loss	1890	Wimbledon	Grass	(United Kingdom) Willoughby Hamilton	8–6, 2–6, 6–3, 1–6, 1–6

=== Doubles (5 titles) ===
Result	Year	Championship	Surface	Partner	Opponents	Score
Win	1884	Wimbledon	Grass	(United Kingdom) Ernest Renshaw	(United Kingdom) Ernest Lewis (United Kingdom) E.L. Williams	6–3, 6–1, 1–6, 6–4
Win	1885	Wimbledon (2)	Grass	(United Kingdom) Ernest Renshaw	(United Kingdom) C.E. Farrer (United Kingdom) A.J. Stanley	6–3, 6–3, 10–8
Win	1886	Wimbledon (3)	Grass	(United Kingdom) Ernest Renshaw	(United Kingdom) C.E. Farrer (United Kingdom) A.J. Stanley	6–3, 6–3, 4–6, 7–5
Win	1888	Wimbledon (4)	Grass	(United Kingdom) Ernest Renshaw	(United Kingdom) Herbert Wilberforce (United Kingdom) Patrick Bowes-Lyon	2–6, 1–6, 6–3, 6–4, 6–3
Win	1889	Wimbledon (5)	Grass	(United Kingdom) Ernest Renshaw	(United Kingdom) Ernest Lewis (United Kingdom) George Hillyard	6–4, 6–4, 3–6, 0–6, 6–1

== Records ==
=== All-time ===
Tournament	Since	Record accomplished	Players matched
Wimbledon Championships	1877	6 consecutive singles titles won (1881–1886)	Stands Alone

== See also ==
- List of Grand Slam men's singles champions
