= Ernest Renshaw =

British tennis player

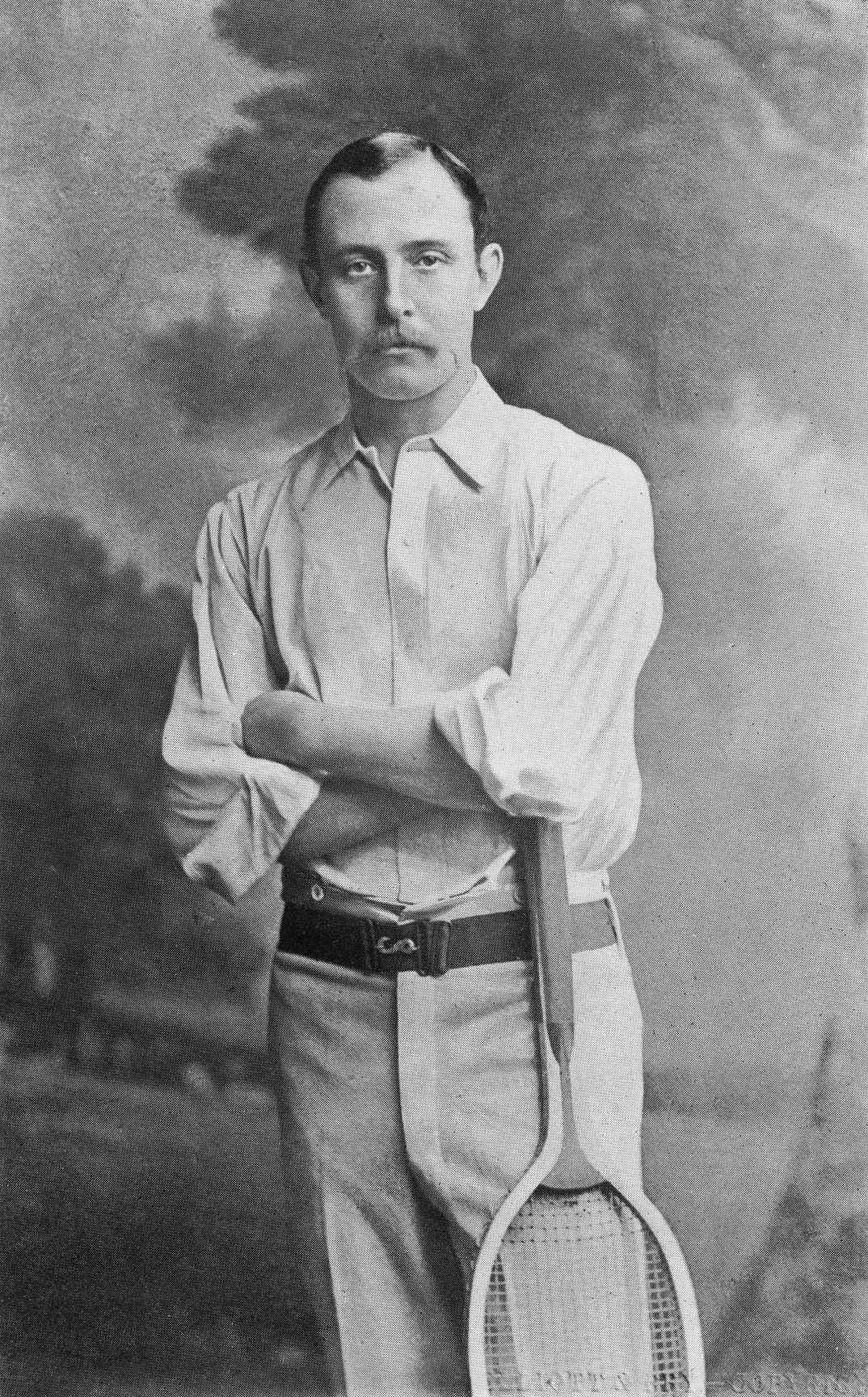
- Full name: Ernest James Renshaw
- Country (sports): United Kingdom
- Born: 3 January 1861 Leamington, Warwickshire, England
- Died: 2 September 1899 (aged 38) Waltham St. Lawrence, Berkshire, England
- Height: 1.78 m (5 ft 10 in)
- Turned pro: 1879 (amateur tour)
- Retired: 1897
- Plays: Right-handed (one-handed backhand)
- Int. Tennis HoF: 1983 (member page)

Singles
- Career titles: 14
- Highest ranking: No. 1 (1887, ITHF)

Grand Slam singles results
- Wimbledon: W (1888)

Grand Slam doubles results
- Wimbledon: W (1884, 1885, 1886, 1888, 1889)

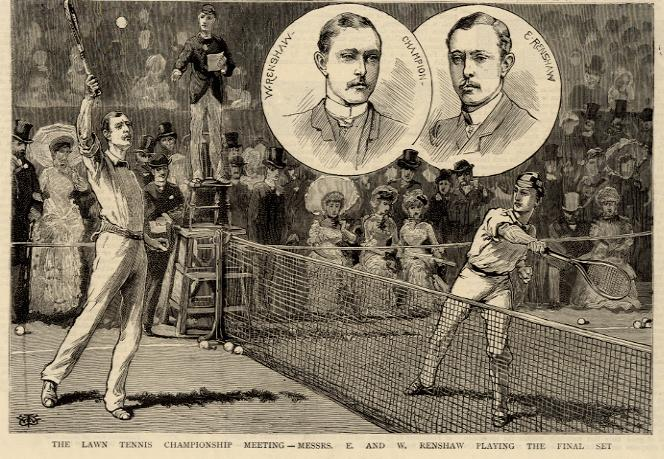
Tennis players William and Ernest Renshaw at Wimbledon, 1882

Ernest James Renshaw (3 January 1861 – 2 September 1899) was a British tennis player who was active in the late 19th century.

Together with his twin brother William Renshaw, Ernest won the men's doubles at Wimbledon five times. He also won the singles championship at Wimbledon once, in 1888 and was inducted into the International Tennis Hall of Fame in 1983. He won the singles title at the Irish Championships on four occasions (1883, 1887, 1888, 1892). Ernest was the older of the brothers by 15 minutes and half an inch taller.

The boom in popularity of the game during the 1880s due to the modern tennis style of the Renshaw brothers became known as the 'Renshaw Rush'.

== Death ==
He died of the effects of carbolic acid, but evidence could not prove whether it had been taken intentionally or not.

In 1983, Ernest Renshaw was elected posthumously into the International Tennis Hall of Fame together with his brother. In 2020, a street in Leamington Spa was named after his brother and him, Renshaw Drive.

== Grand Slam finals ==
=== Singles (1 title, 4 runners-up) ===
Result	Year	Championship	Surface	Opponent	Score
Loss	1882	Wimbledon	Grass	(United Kingdom) William Renshaw	6–1, 2–6, 4–6, 6–2, 6–2
Loss	1883	Wimbledon	Grass	(United Kingdom) William Renshaw	2–6, 6–3, 6–3, 4–6, 6–3
Loss	1887	Wimbledon	Grass	(United Kingdom) Herbert Lawford	1–6, 6–3, 3–6, 6–4, 6–4
Win	1888	Wimbledon	Grass	(United Kingdom) Herbert Lawford	6–3, 7–5, 6–0
Loss	1889	Wimbledon	Grass	(United Kingdom) William Renshaw	6–4, 6–1, 3–6, 6–0

=== Doubles (5 titles) ===
Result	Year	Championship	Surface	Partner	Opponents	Score
Win	1884	Wimbledon	Grass	(United Kingdom) William Renshaw	(United Kingdom) Ernest Lewis (United Kingdom) E.L. Williams	6–3, 6–1, 1–6, 6–4
Win	1885	Wimbledon	Grass	(United Kingdom) William Renshaw	(United Kingdom) C.E. Farrer (United Kingdom) A.J. Stanley	6–3, 6–3, 10–8
Win	1886	Wimbledon	Grass	(United Kingdom) William Renshaw	(United Kingdom) C.E. Farrer (United Kingdom) A.J. Stanley	6–3, 6–3, 4–6, 7–5
Win	1888	Wimbledon	Grass	(United Kingdom) William Renshaw	(United Kingdom) Herbert Wilberforce (United Kingdom) Patrick Bowes-Lyon	2–6, 1–6, 6–3, 6–4, 6–3
Win	1889	Wimbledon	Grass	(United Kingdom) William Renshaw	(United Kingdom) Ernest Lewis (United Kingdom) George Hillyard	6–4, 6–4, 3–6, 0–6, 6–1

== Performance timeline ==
Key
W	F	SF	QF	#R	RR	Q#	DNQ	A	NH

(W) winner; (F) finalist; (SF) semifinalist; (QF) quarterfinalist; (#R) rounds 4, 3, 2, 1; (RR) round-robin stage; (Q#) qualification round; (DNQ) did not qualify; (A) absent; (NH) not held; (SR) strike rate (events won / competed); (W–L) win–loss record.

Events with a challenge round: (W_{C}) won; (CR) lost the challenge round; (F_{A}) all comers' finalist

(OF) only for French club members

	1877	1878	1879	1880	1881	1882	1883	1884	1885	1886	1887	1888	1889	1890	1891	1892	1893	SR	W–L	Win %
Grand Slam tournaments																		1 / 12	32–11	74.4
French	Not held														OF	OF	OF	0 / 0	–	–
Wimbledon	A	A	A	QF	3R	CR	CR	SF	F_{A}	QF	F	W_{C}	CR	A	SF	A	2R	1 / 12	32–11	74.4
U.S.	NH	NH	NH	NH	A	A	A	A	A	A	A	A	A	A	A	A	A	0 / 0	–	–
Australian	Not held																	0 / 0	–	–
Win–loss				3–1	2–1	5–1	4–1	3–1	4–1	2–1	2–1	5–0	0–1		2–1		0–1			
