= Arthur J. Stanley =

English sportsman and stockbroker

Arthur John Stanley (26 June 1853 – 16 July 1935) was an English sportsman and stockbroker. An association footballer, he was member of Clapham Rovers F.C., for whom he played as an outside-forward. He also played both singles and doubles tennis at Wimbledon.

== Biography ==
Stanley was the son of Charles Stanley, of 38 Warwick Road, Maida Hill, London. He was born at Paddington, London, and educated at Repton and Trinity College, Cambridge.

Stanley made one appearance for Wanderers, scoring the only goal in a 1–0 victory over Westminster School on 21 November 1877.

He was later a member of the Clapham Rovers team that reached the FA Cup final twice, losing 1–0 to Old Etonians in 1879, going on to win the cup in 1880 with a 1–0 win over Oxford University at The Kennington Oval.

As a tennis player he entered Wimbledon Championships from 1881 through 1885, and as a doubles player from 1885 to 1891, making a final comeback in doubles after a 9-year absence in 1901. His doubles partners were Claude Farrer 1885–1887, Clement Cazalet in 1888, A. Walker 1889, Herbert Wilberforce in 1890, Wilfred Milne in 1891, and H. Wilson in 1901.

- 1885. R1 bt A. Dunn and C. Liddel 6–4, 6–4, 6–4. QF bt M.G. MacNamara and R.M. Wile 6–2, 4–6, 6–3, 8–6. SF bt Charles Ross and William Taylor 6–3, 8–6, 6–2. F lst to Renshaw brothers 3–6, 3–6, 8–10.

Stanley died at 53 Lancaster Gate, Hyde Park, London, in July 1935, aged 82.

== Honours ==
Clapham Rovers

- FA Cup winner: 1880
- FA Cup runner-up: 1879
