= List of British singles finalists at Grand Slam tennis tournaments =

Despite being the founders of the sport of tennis, Britain has not enjoyed much success in the four Grand Slams; namely the Australian Open, the French Open, Wimbledon, and the US Open. The most recent British winner was Emma Raducanu, who won the 2021 US Open Women's Singles, beating Leylah Fernandez in the final. The last man to win a Grand Slam tournament was Andy Murray, who won Wimbledon in 2016, beating Milos Raonic in the final.

The most successful British tennis player of all time was Fred Perry, who is the only Briton to have won all four Grand Slam tournaments. Angela Mortimer, Ann Haydon-Jones and Virginia Wade each won three of the Grand Slams. Andy Murray is the only British player, apart from Fred Perry, to have reached the final of all four Grand Slams.

This table lists British Grand Slam singles tennis finalists. Competitors normally only competed in their home countries in the early years of the championships, and British players always won the men's tournament at Wimbledon until 1906, and the women's tournament until 1905.

== Key ==
- Heavy type means champion
- Light type means losing finalist

== Men's singles ==
Name	Wimbledon	French	USA	Australian
Spencer Gore	1877 1878			
William Marshall	1877			
Frank Hadow	1878			
John Hartley	1879 1880 1881			
Vere St. Leger Goold	1879			
Herbert Lawford	1880 1884 1885 1886 1887 1888			
William Renshaw	1881 1882 1883 1884 1885 1886 1889 1890			
Ernest Renshaw	1882 1883 1887 1888 1889			
Willoughby Hamilton	1890			
H. Briggs		1891		
Wilfred Baddeley	1891 1892 1893 1894 1895 1896			
Joshua Pim	1891 1892 1893 1894			
Wilberforce Eaves	1895		1897	
Harold Mahony	1896 1897			
Reginald Doherty	1897 1898 1899 1900 1901		1902	
Francky Wardan		1897		
Laurence Doherty	1898 1902 1903 1904 1905 1906		1903	
Arthur Gore	1899 1901 1902 1907 1908 1909 1910 1912			
Sydney Smith	1900			
Frank Riseley	1903 1904 1906			
Herbert Barrett	1908 1911			
Josiah Ritchie	1909			
James Cecil Parke				1912
Alfred Beamish				1912
Gordon Lowe				1915
Algernon Kingscote				1919
Randolph Lycett	1922			
Colin Gregory				1929
Bunny Austin	1932 1938	1937		
Fred Perry	1934 1935 1936	1935 1936	1933 1934 1936	1934 1935
John Lloyd				1977
Greg Rusedski			1997	
Andy Murray	2012 2013 2016	2016	2008 2012	2010 2011 2013 2015 2016

== Women's singles ==
Name	Wimbledon	French	USA	Australian
Maud Watson	1884 1885 1886			
Lillian Watson	1884			
Blanche Bingley	1885 1886 1887 1888 1889 1891 1892 1893 1894 1897 1899 1900 1901			
Lottie Dod	1887 1888 1891 1892 1893			
Lena Rice	1889 1890			
May Jacks	1890			
Mabel Cahill			1891 1892	
Edith Austin	1894			
Charlotte Cooper	1895 1896 1897 1898 1899 1900 1901 1902 1904 1908 1912			
Helen Jackson	1895			
Alice Simpson-Pickering	1896			
Louisa Martin	1898			
Muriel Robb	1902			
Dorothea Chambers	1903 1904 1905 1906 1907 1910 1911 1913 1914 1919 1920			
Ethel Thomson Larcombe	1903 1912 1914			
Agnes Morton	1908 1909			
Dora Boothby	1909 1910 1911			
Winifred McNair	1913			
Germaine Golding		1922 1923		
Kathleen McKane Godfree	1923 1924 1926	1925	1925	
Joan Fry	1925			
Eileen Bennett Whittingstall		1928	1931	
Phoebe Holcroft Watson			1929	
Betty Nuthall		1931	1927 1930	
Margaret Scriven		1933 1934		
Dorothy Round Little	1933 1934 1937			1935
Kay Stammers	1939			
Patricia Ward Hales			1955	
Angela Buxton	1956			
Angela Mortimer	1958 1961	1955 1956		1958
Shirley Brasher		1957 1958		
Christine Truman	1961	1959	1959	
Ann Haydon-Jones	1967 1969	1961 1963 1966 1968 1969	1961 1967	
Sue Barker		1976		
Virginia Wade	1977		1968	1972
Emma Raducanu			2021	

== See also ==
- List of US Open women's singles champions
- List of US Open men's singles champions
- List of Australian Open men's singles champions
- List of Australian Open women's singles champions
- List of French Open men's singles champions
- List of French Open women's singles champions
- List of Wimbledon gentlemen's singles champions
- List of Wimbledon ladies' singles champions
