= List of Wimbledon ladies' singles champions =

Annual tennis tournament winners

Wimbledon ladies' singles champions
- Location: London; United Kingdom
- Venue: AELTC
- Governing body: AELTC / LTA
- Created: 1884
- Editions: 131 events (2025); 57 events (Open Era)
- Surface: Grass (1884–Present)
- Prize money: £ 2,350,000 (2023)
- Trophy: Venus Rosewater Dish
- Website: wimbledon.com

Most titles
- Amateur era: 7: Dorothea Lambert Chambers (challenge round); 8: Helen Wills Moody (regular)
- Open era: 9: Martina Navratilova

Most consecutive titles
- Amateur era: 3: Lottie Dod; Suzanne Lenglen (challenge round); 4: Helen Wills Moody (regular)
- Open era: 6: Martina Navratilova

Current champion
- Linda Nosková (First title)

Wimbledon Championships, is an annual tennis tournament first contested in 1877 and played on outdoor grass courts (Note: Since 2009, Centre Court features a retractable roof, allowing indoor and night-time play.) (Note: Wimbledon entered the Open Era with the 1968 edition, allowing professional players to compete alongside amateurs.) at the All England Lawn Tennis and Croquet Club (AELTC) in the Wimbledon suburb of London, United Kingdom. The ladies' singles was started in 1884.

== History ==
Wimbledon has historically been played in the last week of June and the first week of July (though changed to the first two weeks of July in 2017), and has been chronologically the third of the four Grand Slam tournaments of the tennis season since 1987. The event was not held from 1915 to 1918 because of World War I and again from 1940 to 1945 because of World War II. The tournament was also not contested in 2020 due to the COVID-19 pandemic.

=== Changes in format ===
The ladies' singles' rules have undergone several changes since the first edition. From 1886 until 1921, the event started with a knockout phase, the all comers' singles, whose winner then faced the defending champion in a challenge round. The all comers' winner was automatically awarded the title eleven times (1889, 1890, 1891, 1894, 1895, 1898, 1903, 1908, 1909, 1912, 1913) in the absence of the previous year's champion. The challenge round system was abolished with the 1922 edition. Since the first championships, all matches have been played at the best-of-three sets. Between 1877 and 1883, the winner of the next game at five games-all took the set in every match except the all comers' final, and the challenge round, which were won with six games and a two games advantage. All sets were decided in two-game advantage format from 1884 to 1970. The lingering death best-of-12 points tie-break was introduced in 1971 for the first two sets, played at eight games-all until 1978 and at six games-all since 1979.

=== Trophy and prize money ===
The ladies' singles champion receives a sterling silver salver commonly known as the "Venus Rosewater Dish", or simply the "Rosewater Dish". The salver, which is 18.75 inches (about 48 cm) in diameter, is decorated with figures from mythology. New singles champions are traditionally elected honorary members of the AELTC by the club's committee. (Note: John McEnroe is the only player to have been denied membership in 1981, because of his on-court behaviour during the championships.) In 2012, the ladies' singles winner received prize money of £1,150,000.

=== Achievements: numbers of wins ===
In the Amateur–challenge round era, Dorothea Lambert Chambers (1903–1904, 1906, 1910–1911, 1913–1914) holds the record for most titles, with seven. However, it is noteworthy that three of Chambers' titles were won in the challenge round. Lottie Dod (1891–1893) and Suzanne Lenglen (1919–1921) hold the record for most consecutive wins in the ladies' singles with three victories each. The record for most wins and most consecutive wins post-challenge round in the Amateur Era, belongs to Helen Wills Moody (1927–1930, 1932–1933, 1935, 1938) with eight, including four straight victories (1927–1930).

In the Open Era, since the inclusion of the professional tennis players, Martina Navratilova (1978–1979, 1982–1987, 1990) holds the record for most victories with nine. Navratilova holds the record for most consecutive victories with six (1982–1987).

This event has been won without the loss of a set during the Open Era, by the following players: Billie Jean King in 1968, 1972, 1973 and 1975, Margaret Court in 1970, Evonne Goolagong Cawley in 1971 and 1980, Chris Evert in 1974 and 1981, Martina Navratilova in 1979, 1983, 1984, 1986, 1987, and 1990, Steffi Graf in 1992 and 1996, Jana Novotná in 1998, Lindsay Davenport in 1999, Venus Williams in 2000, 2007 and 2008, Serena Williams in 2002, 2009, 2010, 2015 and 2016, Petra Kvitová in 2011 and 2014 and Marion Bartoli in 2013.

== Champions ==
Key to background colours
Regular competition
All comers' winner, challenge round winner ‡
Defending champion, challenge round winner †
All comers' winner, no challenge round ◊

=== Amateur Era ===
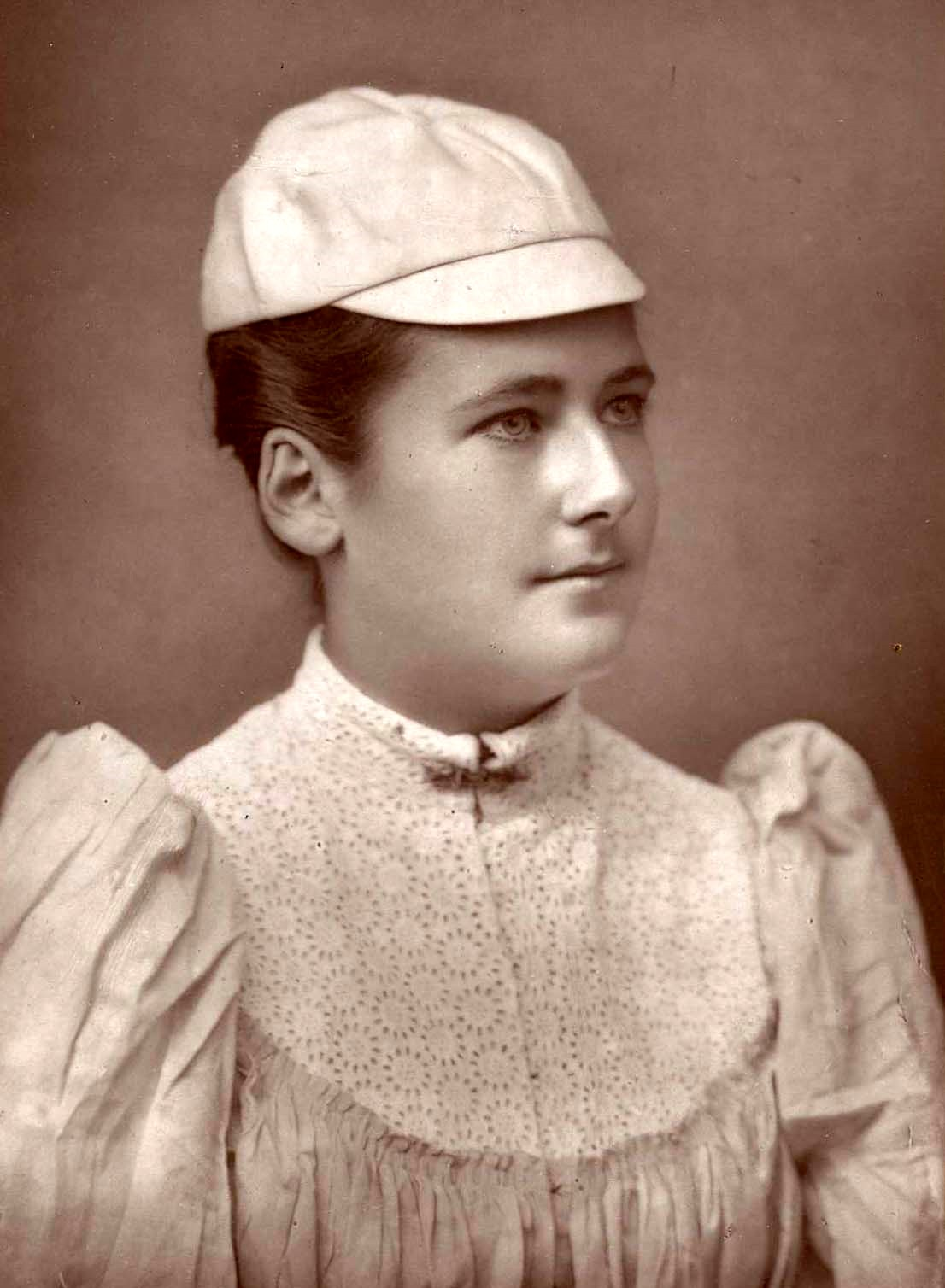
Lottie Dod was a five-time champion and is the youngest ever winner of the ladies' singles championships (15 years and 285 days).

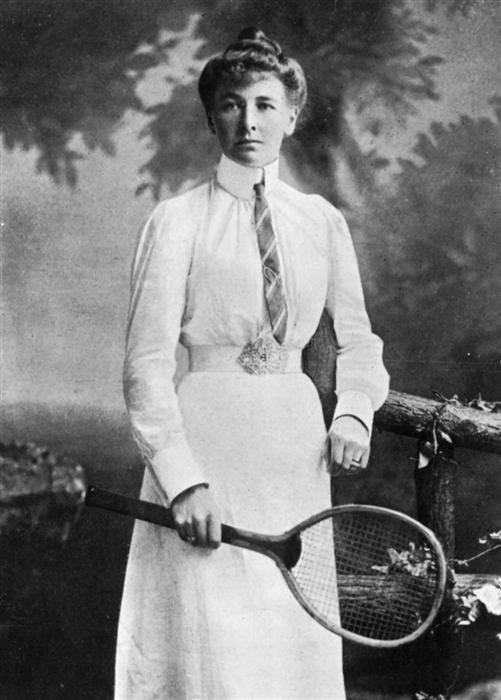
Charlotte Cooper Sterry was a five-time champion and is the oldest ladies' singles champion (37 year and 282 days).

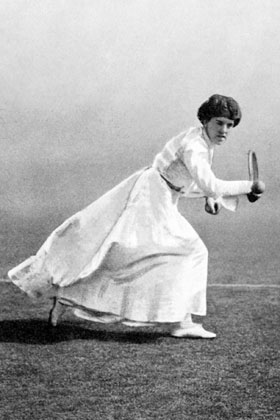
Dorothea Lambert Chambers was a seven-time champion over a twelve-year period from 1903 to 1914.

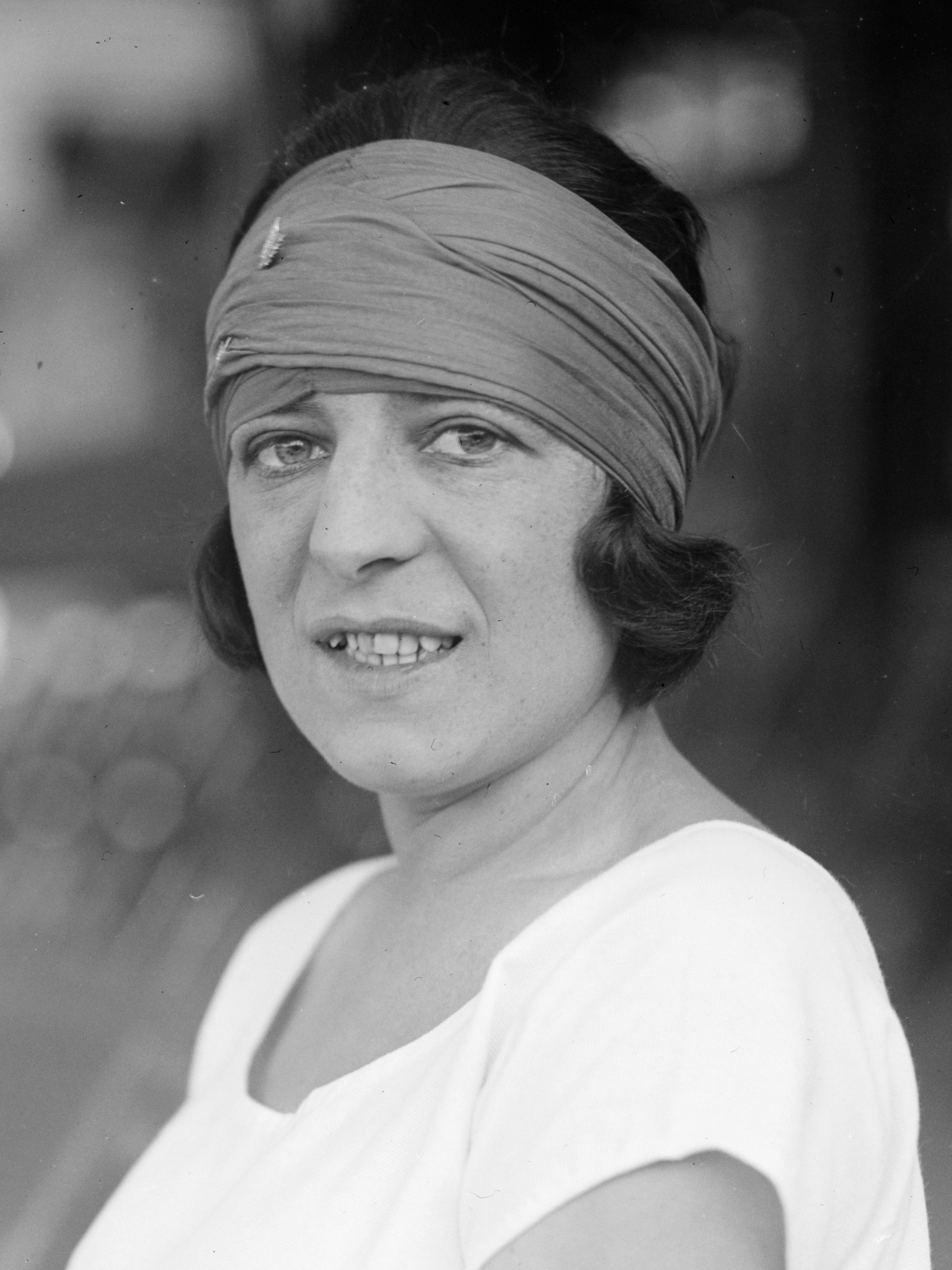
Suzanne Lenglen was a six-time champion.

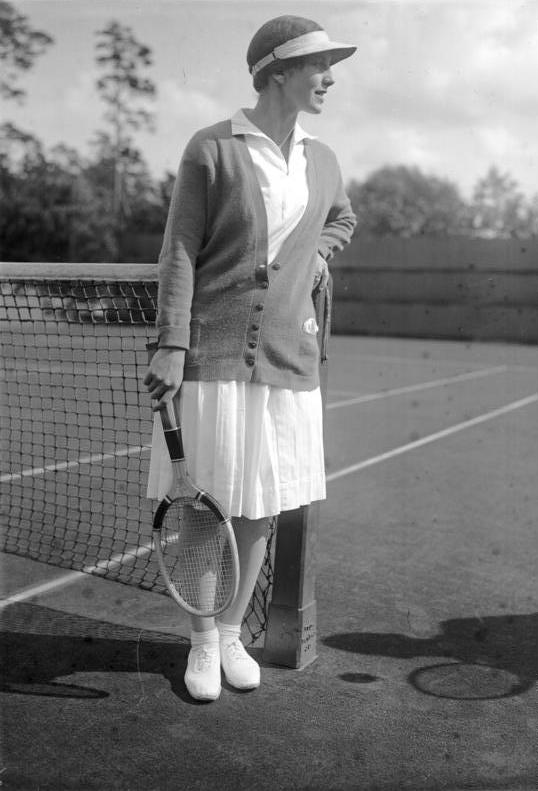
Helen Wills Moody was an eight-time champion between 1927 and 1938.

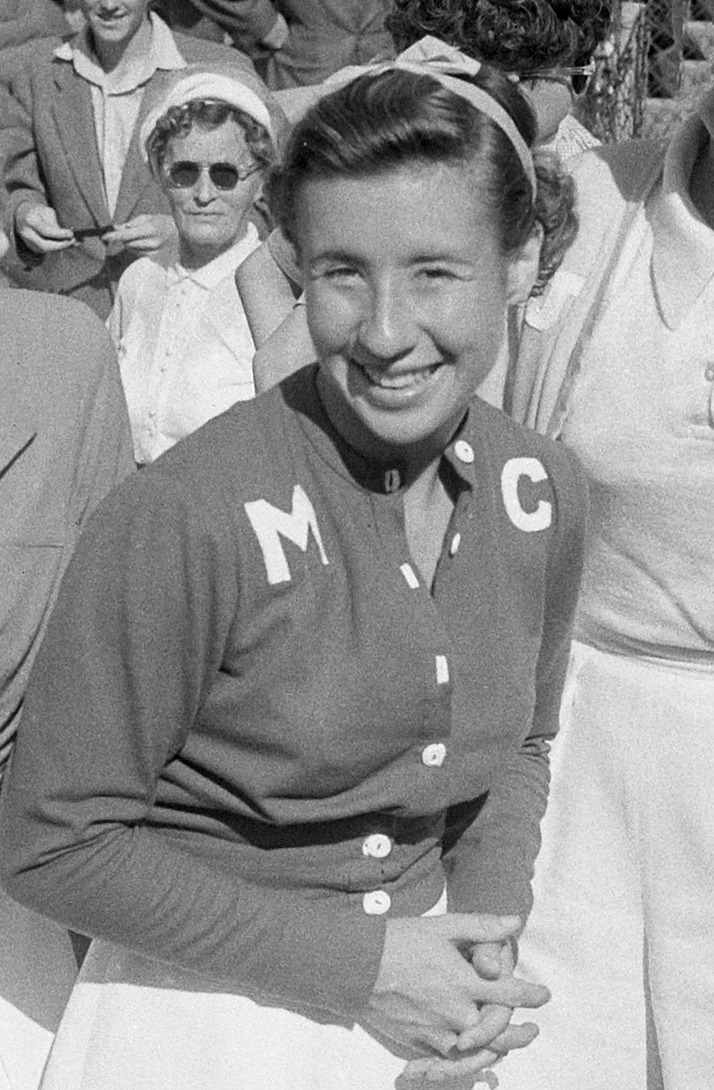
Maureen Connolly competed in 1952, 1953 and 1954 and won the title on all three occasions.

Althea Gibson won the title in 1957, the first black tennis player to do so, and successfully defended her title in 1958.

Year (Note: Each year is linked to an article about that particular year's draws, but pre-1922 they did not have draws due to the challenge round system. In 1922 till the present they do have draws, but the years of 1925–1939 do not have draw pages with links, so it is linked to the year's articles instead.)	Country	Champion	Country	Runner-up	Score in the final
1884	BRI (Note: "British Isles" (BRI) is used for players from the United Kingdom of Great Britain and Ireland (1801–1922), distinct from "Great Britain" (GBR) used for players from the United Kingdom of Great Britain and Northern Ireland (1922–present).)	Maud Watson (1/2)	BRI	Lilian Watson	6–8, 6–3, 6–3
1885	BRI	Maud Watson (2/2)	BRI	Blanche Bingley	6–1, 7–5
1886	BRI	Blanche Bingley (1/6) ‡	BRI	Maud Watson	6–3, 6–3
1887	BRI	Lottie Dod (1/5) ‡	BRI	Blanche Bingley	6–2, 6–0
1888	BRI	Lottie Dod (2/5) †	BRI	Blanche Hillyard	6–3, 6–3
1889	BRI	Blanche Hillyard (2/6) ◊	BRI	Lena Rice	4–6, 8–6, 6–4
1890	BRI	Lena Rice ◊	BRI	May Jacks	6–4, 6–1
1891	BRI	Lottie Dod (3/5) ◊	BRI	Blanche Hillyard	6–2, 6–1
1892	BRI	Lottie Dod (4/5) †	BRI	Blanche Hillyard	6–1, 6–1
1893	BRI	Lottie Dod (5/5) †	BRI	Blanche Hillyard	6–8, 6–1, 6–4
1894	BRI	Blanche Hillyard (3/6) ◊	BRI	Edith Austin	6–1, 6–1
1895	BRI	Charlotte Cooper (1/5) ◊	BRI	Helen Jackson	7–5, 8–6
1896	BRI	Charlotte Cooper (2/5) †	BRI	Alice Pickering	6–2, 6–3
1897	BRI	Blanche Hillyard (4/6) ‡	BRI	Charlotte Cooper	5–7, 7–5, 6–2
1898	BRI	Charlotte Cooper (3/5) ◊	BRI	Louisa Martin	6–4, 6–4
1899	BRI	Blanche Hillyard (5/6) ‡	BRI	Charlotte Cooper	6–2, 6–3
1900	BRI	Blanche Hillyard (6/6) †	BRI	Charlotte Cooper	4–6, 6–4, 6–4
1901	BRI	Charlotte Sterry (4/5) ‡	BRI	Blanche Hillyard	6–2, 6–2
1902	BRI	Muriel Robb ‡	BRI	Charlotte Sterry	7–5, 6–1
1903	BRI	Dorothea Douglass (1/7) ◊	BRI	Ethel Larcombe	4–6, 6–4, 6–2
1904	BRI	Dorothea Douglass (2/7) †	BRI	Charlotte Sterry	6–0, 6–3
1905	USA	May Sutton (1/2) ‡	BRI	Dorothea Douglass	6–3, 6–4
1906	BRI	Dorothea Douglass (3/7) ‡	USA	May Sutton	6–3, 9–7
1907	USA	May Sutton (2/2) ‡	BRI	Dorothea Lambert Chambers	6–1, 6–4
1908	BRI	Charlotte Sterry (5/5) ◊	BRI	Agnes Morton	6–4, 6–4
1909	BRI	Dora Boothby ◊	BRI	Agnes Morton	6–4, 4–6, 8–6
1910	BRI	Dorothea Lambert Chambers (4/7) ‡	BRI	Dora Boothby	6–2, 6–2
1911	BRI	Dorothea Lambert Chambers (5/7) †	BRI	Dora Boothby	6–0, 6–0
1912	BRI	Ethel Larcombe ◊	BRI	Charlotte Sterry	6–3, 6–1
1913	BRI	Dorothea Lambert Chambers (6/7) ◊	BRI	Winifred McNair	6–0, 6–4
1914	BRI	Dorothea Lambert Chambers (7/7) †	BRI	Ethel Larcombe	7–5, 6–4
1915	No competition (due to World War I) (Note: The tournament was not held from 1915 to 1918 because of World War I.)				
1916	No competition (due to World War I)				
1917	No competition (due to World War I)				
1918	No competition (due to World War I)				
1919	FRA	Suzanne Lenglen (1/6) ‡	BRI	Dorothea Lambert Chambers	10–8, 4–6, 9–7
1920	FRA	Suzanne Lenglen (2/6) †	BRI	Dorothea Lambert Chambers	6–3, 6–0
1921	FRA	Suzanne Lenglen (3/6) †	USA	Elizabeth Ryan	6–2, 6–0
1922	FRA	Suzanne Lenglen (4/6)	USA	Molla Mallory	6–2, 6–0
1923	FRA	Suzanne Lenglen (5/6)	GBR	Kitty McKane	6–2, 6–2
1924	GBR	Kitty McKane (1/2)	USA	Helen Wills	4–6, 6–4, 6–4
1925	FRA	Suzanne Lenglen (6/6)	GBR	Joan Fry	6–2, 6–0
1926	GBR	Kitty Godfree (2/2)	ESP	Lilí Álvarez	6–2, 4–6, 6–3
1927	USA	Helen Wills (1/8)	ESP	Lilí Álvarez	6–2, 6–4
1928	USA	Helen Wills (2/8)	ESP	Lilí Álvarez	6–2, 6–3
1929	USA	Helen Wills (3/8)	USA	Helen Jacobs	6–1, 6–2
1930	USA	Helen Moody (4/8)	USA	Elizabeth Ryan	6–2, 6–2
1931	GER	Cilly Aussem	GER	Hilde Krahwinkel	6–2, 7–5
1932	USA	Helen Moody (5/8)	USA	Helen Jacobs	6–3, 6–1
1933	USA	Helen Moody (6/8)	GBR	Dorothy Round	6–4, 6–8, 6–3
1934	GBR	Dorothy Round (1/2)	USA	Helen Jacobs	6–2, 5–7, 6–3
1935	USA	Helen Moody (7/8)	USA	Helen Jacobs	6–3, 3–6, 7–5
1936	USA	Helen Jacobs	DEN	Hilde Sperling	6–2, 4–6, 7–5
1937	GBR	Dorothy Round (2/2)	POL	Jadwiga Jędrzejowska	6–2, 2–6, 7–5
1938	USA	Helen Moody (8/8)	USA	Helen Jacobs	6–4, 6–0
1939	USA	Alice Marble	GBR	Kay Stammers	6–2, 6–0
1940	No competition (due to World War II) (Note: The tournament was not held from 1940 to 1945 because of World War II.)				
1941	No competition (due to World War II)				
1942	No competition (due to World War II)				
1943	No competition (due to World War II)				
1944	No competition (due to World War II)				
1945	No competition (due to World War II)				
1946	USA	Pauline Betz	USA	Louise Brough	6–2, 6–4
1947	USA	Margaret Osborne	USA	Doris Hart	6–2, 6–4
1948	USA	Louise Brough (1/4)	USA	Doris Hart	6–3, 8–6
1949	USA	Louise Brough (2/4)	USA	Margaret duPont	10–8, 1–6, 10–8
1950	USA	Louise Brough (3/4)	USA	Margaret duPont	6–1, 3–6, 6–1
1951	USA	Doris Hart	USA	Shirley Fry	6–1, 6–0
1952	USA	Maureen Connolly (1/3)	USA	Louise Brough	7–5, 6–3
1953	USA	Maureen Connolly (2/3)	USA	Doris Hart	8–6, 7–5
1954	USA	Maureen Connolly (3/3)	USA	Louise Brough	6–2, 7–5
1955	USA	Louise Brough (4/4)	USA	Beverly Fleitz	7–5, 8–6
1956	USA	Shirley Fry	GBR	Angela Buxton	6–3, 6–1
1957	USA	Althea Gibson (1/2)	USA	Darlene Hard	6–3, 6–2
1958	USA	Althea Gibson (2/2)	GBR	Angela Mortimer	8–6, 6–2
1959	BRA	Maria Bueno (1/3)	USA	Darlene Hard	6–4, 6–3
1960	BRA	Maria Bueno (2/3)	RSA	Sandra Reynolds	8–6, 6–0
1961	GBR	Angela Mortimer	GBR	Christine Truman	4–6, 6–4, 7–5
1962	USA	Karen Susman	TCH	Věra Suková	6–4, 6–4
1963	AUS	Margaret Smith (1/3)	USA	Billie Jean Moffitt	6–3, 6–4
1964	BRA	Maria Bueno (3/3)	AUS	Margaret Smith	6–4, 7–9, 6–3
1965	AUS	Margaret Smith (2/3)	BRA	Maria Bueno	6–4, 7–5
1966	USA	Billie Jean King (1/6)	BRA	Maria Bueno	6–3, 3–6, 6–1
1967	USA	Billie Jean King (2/6)	GBR	Ann Jones	6–3, 6–4

=== Open Era ===
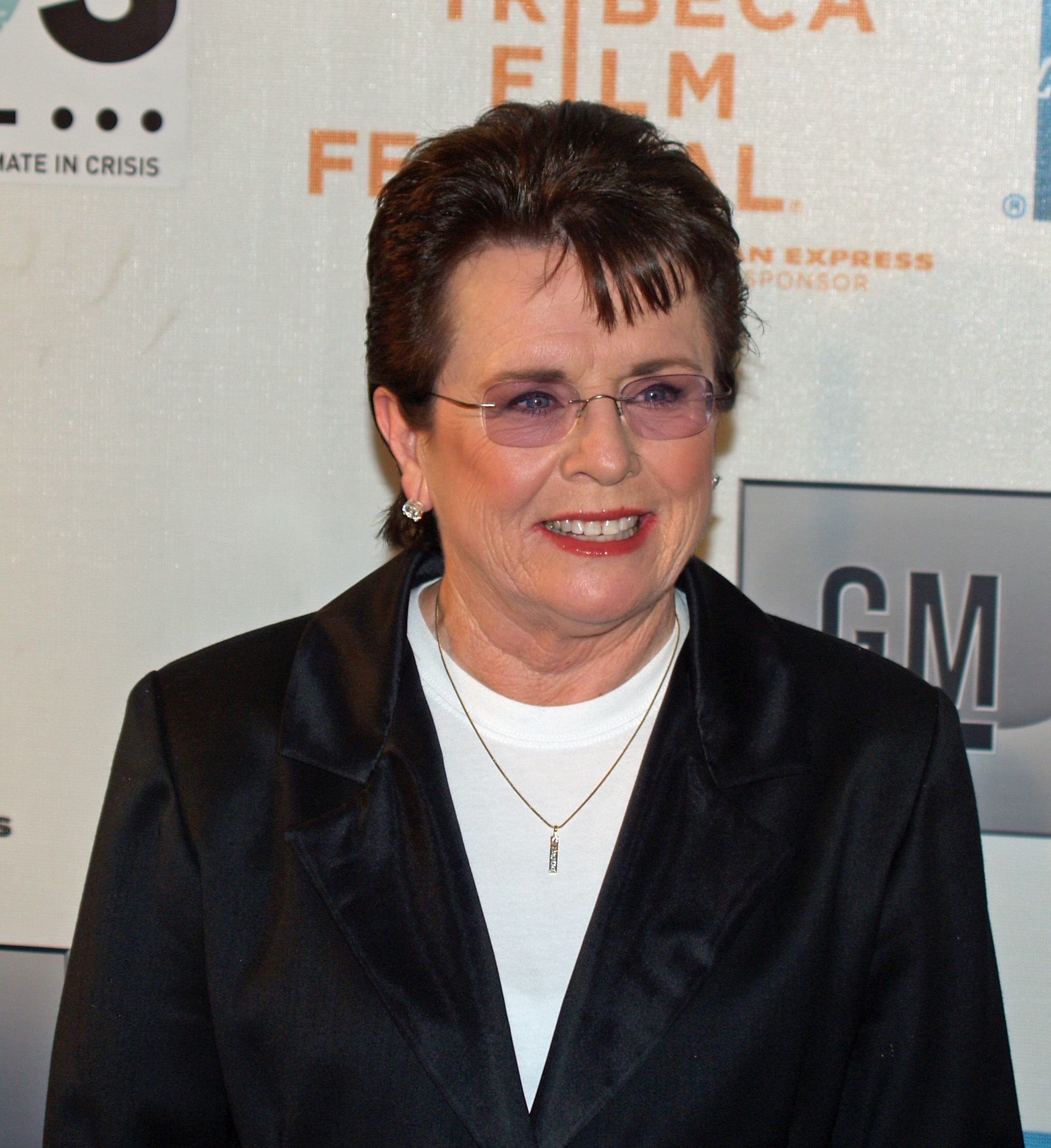
Billie Jean King is a six-time champion.

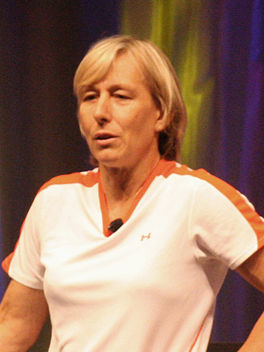
Martina Navratilova is a nine-time singles champion, a Grand Slam record in the Open Era for women (Margaret Court won the Australian 11 times). She won six consecutive titles from 1982 to 1987.

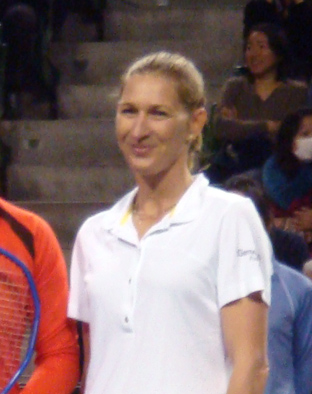
Steffi Graf is a seven-time champion over a nine-year period from 1988 to 1996.

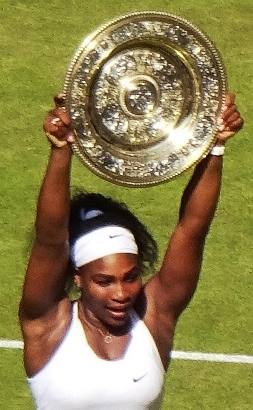
Serena Williams is a seven-time champion.

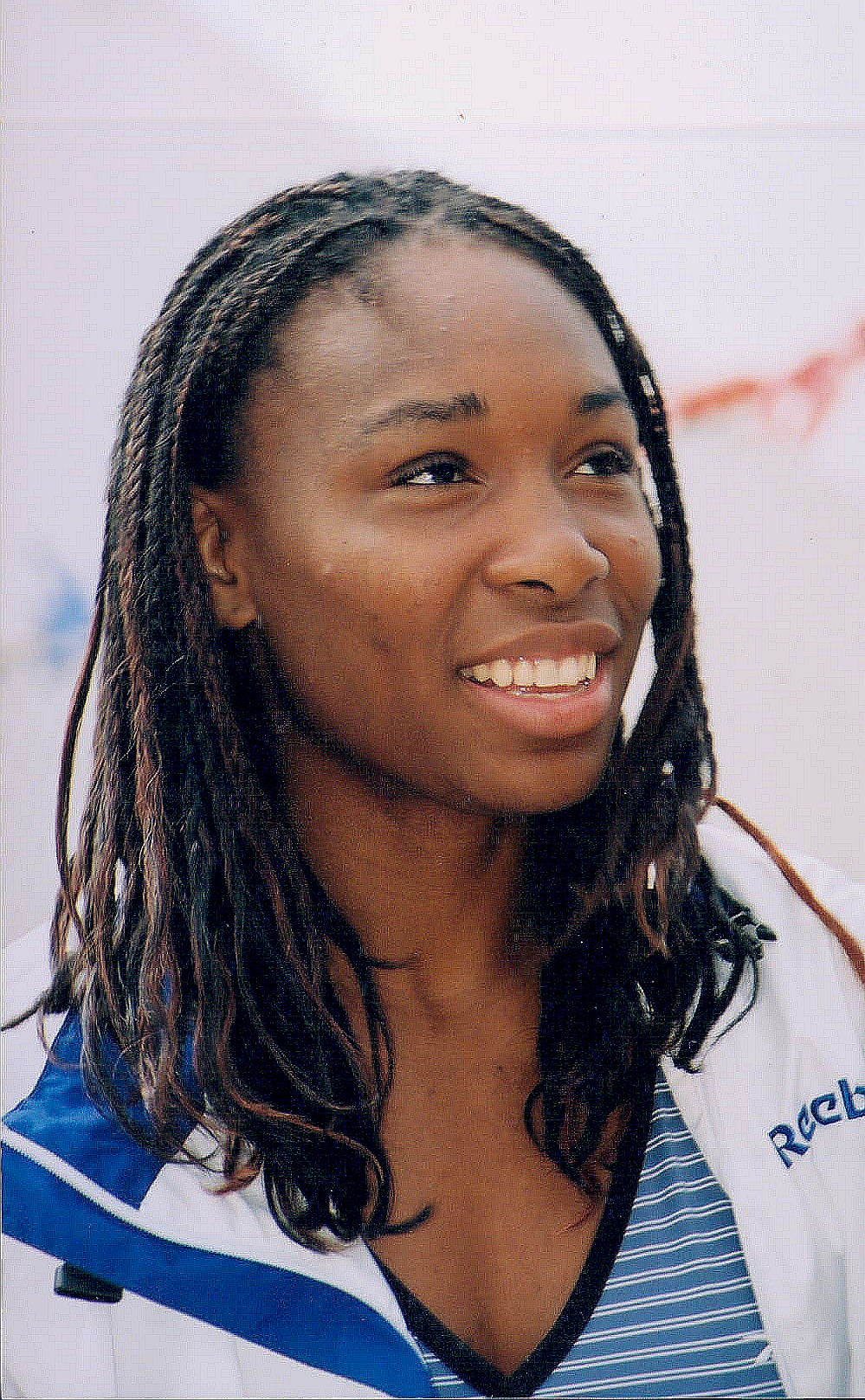
Venus Williams is a five-time champion over a nine-year period from 2000 to 2008.

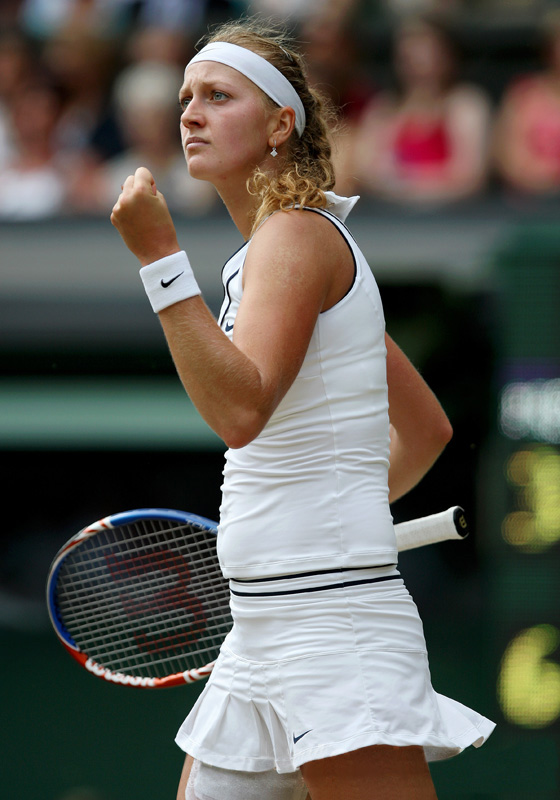
Petra Kvitová is a two-time champion, and created a first in 2011, when she became the first player, male or female, born in the 1990s to win a Grand Slam tournament title.

Year	Country	Champion	Country	Runner-up	Score in the final
1968	USA	Billie Jean King (3/6)	AUS	Judy Tegart	9–7, 7–5
1969	GBR	Ann Jones	USA	Billie Jean King	3–6, 6–3, 6–2
1970	AUS	Margaret Court (3/3)	USA	Billie Jean King	14–12, 11–9
1971	AUS	Evonne Goolagong (1/2)	AUS	Margaret Court	6–4, 6–1
1972	USA	Billie Jean King (4/6)	AUS	Evonne Goolagong	6–3, 6–3
1973	USA	Billie Jean King (5/6)	USA	Chris Evert	6–0, 7–5
1974	USA	Chris Evert (1/3)	URS	Olga Morozova	6–0, 6–4
1975	USA	Billie Jean King (6/6)	AUS	Evonne Goolagong	6–0, 6–1
1976	USA	Chris Evert (2/3)	AUS	Evonne Goolagong	6–3, 4–6, 8–6
1977	GBR	Virginia Wade	NED	Betty Stöve	4–6, 6–3, 6–1
1978	USA	Martina Navratilova (Note: Martina Navratilova was born in Czechoslovakia, but competed as an American after the US Open in 1975, having sought asylum in the United States, which made her relinquish her Czechoslovak citizenship.) (1/9)	USA	Chris Evert	2–6, 6–4, 7–5
1979	USA	Martina Navratilova (2/9)	USA	Chris Evert	6–4, 6–4
1980	AUS	Evonne Goolagong (2/2)	USA	Chris Evert	6–1, 7–6^{(7–4)}
1981	USA	Chris Evert (3/3)	TCH (Note: Czechoslovakia (TCH, 1918–1992) split into the Czech Republic (CZE, 1993–present) and Slovakia (SVK, 1993–present).)	Hana Mandlíková	6–2, 6–2
1982	USA	Martina Navratilova (3/9)	USA	Chris Evert	6–1, 3–6, 6–2
1983	USA	Martina Navratilova (4/9)	USA	Andrea Jaeger	6–0, 6–3
1984	USA	Martina Navratilova (5/9)	USA	Chris Evert	7–6^{(7–5)}, 6–2
1985	USA	Martina Navratilova (6/9)	USA	Chris Evert	4–6, 6–3, 6–2
1986	USA	Martina Navratilova (7/9)	TCH	Hana Mandlíková	7–6^{(7–1)}, 6–3
1987	USA	Martina Navratilova (8/9)	FRG (Note: Steffi Graf played initially for West Germany (FRG), and after unification in 1990 for Germany (GER).)	Steffi Graf	7–5, 6–3
1988	FRG	Steffi Graf (1/7)	USA	Martina Navratilova	5–7, 6–2, 6–1
1989	FRG	Steffi Graf (2/7)	USA	Martina Navratilova	6–2, 6–7^{(1–7)}, 6–1
1990	USA	Martina Navratilova (9/9)	USA	Zina Garrison	6–4, 6–1
1991	GER	Steffi Graf (3/7)	ARG	Gabriela Sabatini	6–4, 3–6, 8–6
1992	GER	Steffi Graf (4/7)	YUG	Monica Seles	6–2, 6–1
1993	GER	Steffi Graf (5/7)	CZE	Jana Novotná	7–6^{(8–6)}, 1–6, 6–4
1994	ESP	Conchita Martínez	USA	Martina Navratilova	6–4, 3–6, 6–3
1995	GER	Steffi Graf (6/7)	ESP	Arantxa Sánchez Vicario	4–6, 6–1, 7–5
1996	GER	Steffi Graf (7/7)	ESP	Arantxa Sánchez Vicario	6–3, 7–5
1997	SUI	Martina Hingis	CZE	Jana Novotná	2–6, 6–3, 6–3
1998	CZE	Jana Novotná	FRA	Nathalie Tauziat	6–4, 7–6^{(7–2)}
1999	USA	Lindsay Davenport	GER	Steffi Graf	6–4, 7–5
2000	USA	Venus Williams (1/5)	USA	Lindsay Davenport	6–3, 7–6^{(7–3)}
2001	USA	Venus Williams (2/5)	BEL	Justine Henin	6–1, 3–6, 6–0
2002	USA	Serena Williams (1/7)	USA	Venus Williams	7–6^{(7–4)}, 6–3
2003	USA	Serena Williams (2/7)	USA	Venus Williams	4–6, 6–4, 6–2
2004	RUS	Maria Sharapova	USA	Serena Williams	6–1, 6–4
2005	USA	Venus Williams (3/5)	USA	Lindsay Davenport	4–6, 7–6^{(7–4)}, 9–7
2006	FRA	Amélie Mauresmo	BEL	Justine Henin	2–6, 6–3, 6–4
2007	USA	Venus Williams (4/5)	FRA	Marion Bartoli	6–4, 6–1
2008	USA	Venus Williams (5/5)	USA	Serena Williams	7–5, 6–4
2009	USA	Serena Williams (3/7)	USA	Venus Williams	7–6^{(7–3)}, 6–2
2010	USA	Serena Williams (4/7)	RUS	Vera Zvonareva	6–3, 6–2
2011	CZE	Petra Kvitová (1/2)	RUS	Maria Sharapova	6–3, 6–4
2012	USA	Serena Williams (5/7)	POL	Agnieszka Radwańska	6–1, 5–7, 6–2
2013	FRA	Marion Bartoli	GER	Sabine Lisicki	6–1, 6–4
2014	CZE	Petra Kvitová (2/2)	CAN	Eugenie Bouchard	6–3, 6–0
2015	USA	Serena Williams (6/7)	ESP	Garbiñe Muguruza	6–4, 6–4
2016	USA	Serena Williams (7/7)	GER	Angelique Kerber	7–5, 6–3
2017	ESP	Garbiñe Muguruza	USA	Venus Williams	7–5, 6–0
2018	GER	Angelique Kerber	USA	Serena Williams	6–3, 6–3
2019	ROU	Simona Halep	USA	Serena Williams	6–2, 6–2
2020	No competition (due to COVID-19 pandemic)				
2021	AUS	Ashleigh Barty	CZE	Karolína Plíšková	6–3, 6–7^{(4–7)}, 6–3
2022	KAZ	Elena Rybakina	TUN	Ons Jabeur	3–6, 6–2, 6–2
2023	CZE	Markéta Vondroušová	TUN	Ons Jabeur	6–4, 6–4
2024	CZE	Barbora Krejčíková	ITA	Jasmine Paolini	6–2, 2–6, 6–4
2025	POL	Iga Świątek	USA	Amanda Anisimova	6–0, 6–0
2026	CZE	Linda Nosková	CZE	Karolína Muchová	6–2, 5–7, 6–3

== Statistics ==
=== Multiple champions ===
Title defended in the challenge round

Player	Amateur Era	Open Era	All-time	Years
Martina Navratilova (USA)	0	9	9	1978, 1979, 1982, 1983, 1984, 1985, 1986, 1987, 1990
Helen Wills Moody (USA)	8	0	8	1927, 1928, 1929, 1930, 1932, 1933, 1935, 1938
Dorothea Lambert Chambers (GBR)	7	0	7	1903, 1904, 1906, 1910, 1911, 1913, 1914
Steffi Graf (GER)	0	7	7	1988, 1989, 1991, 1992, 1993, 1995, 1996
Serena Williams (USA)	0	7	7	2002, 2003, 2009, 2010, 2012, 2015, 2016
Blanche Bingley (GBR)	6	0	6	1886, 1889, 1894, 1897, 1899, 1900
Suzanne Lenglen (FRA)	6	0	6	1919, 1920, 1921, 1922, 1923, 1925
Billie Jean King (USA)	2	4	6	1966, 1967, 1968, 1972, 1973, 1975
Charlotte Cooper Sterry (GBR)	5	0	5	1895, 1896, 1898, 1901, 1908
Lottie Dod (GBR)	5	0	5	1887, 1888, 1891, 1892, 1893
Venus Williams (USA)	0	5	5	2000, 2001, 2005, 2007, 2008
Louise Brough (USA)	4	0	4	1948, 1949, 1950, 1955
Maureen Connolly (USA)	3	0	3	1952, 1953, 1954
Maria Bueno (BRA)	3	0	3	1959, 1960, 1964
Margaret Court (AUS)	2	1	3	1963, 1965, 1970
Chris Evert (USA)	0	3	3	1974, 1976, 1981
Althea Gibson (USA)	2	0	2	1957, 1958
Dorothy Round (GBR)	2	0	2	1934, 1937
Kathleen McKane Godfree (GBR)	2	0	2	1924, 1926
May Sutton (USA)	2	0	2	1905, 1907
Maud Watson (GBR)	2	0	2	1884, 1885
Evonne Goolagong (AUS)	0	2	2	1971, 1980
Petra Kvitová (CZE)	0	2	2	2011, 2014

=== Championships by country ===
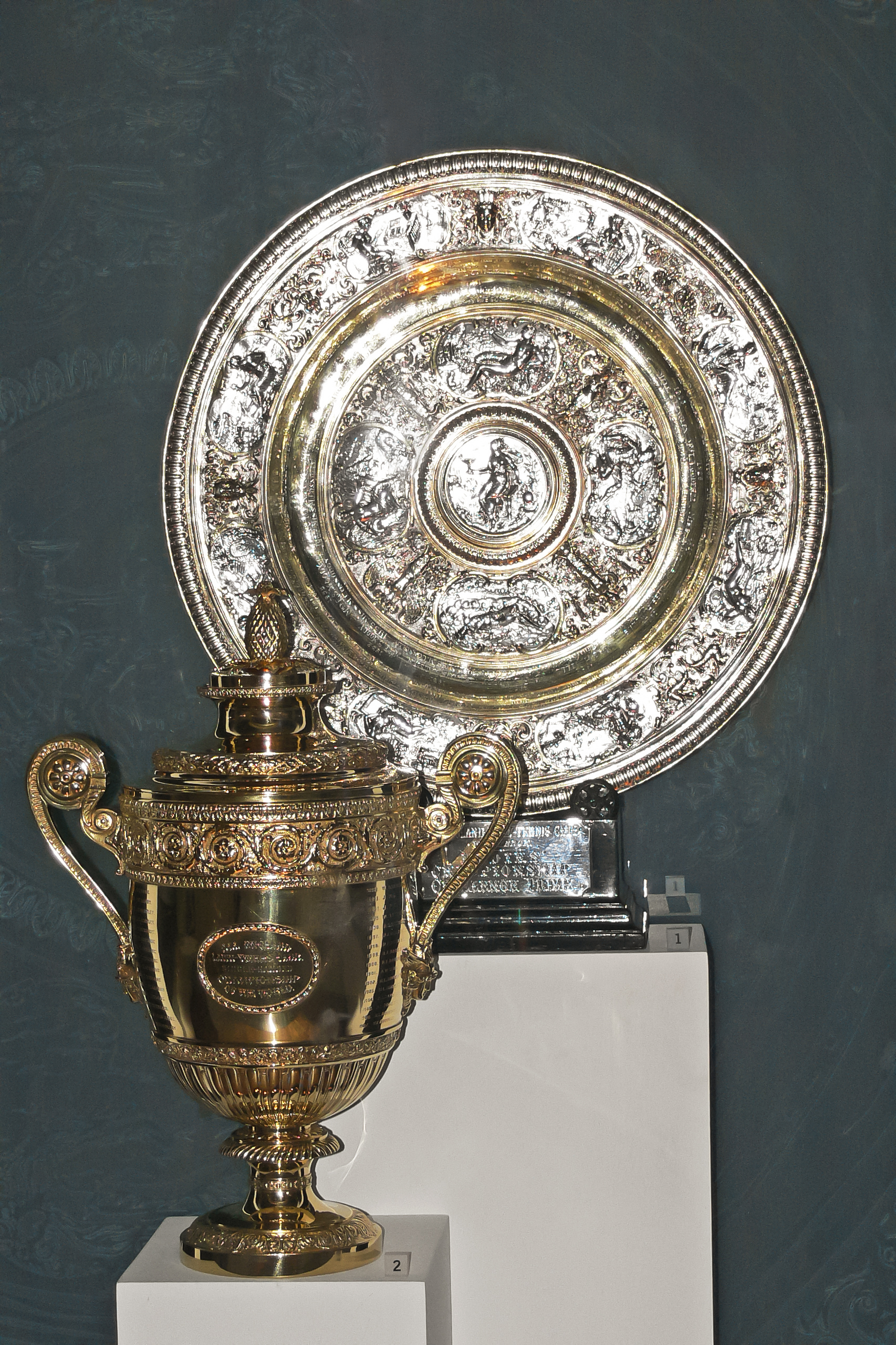
The Ladies' Singles plate (right) with the Gentlemen's Singles trophy (left).

Country	Amateur Era	Open Era	All-time	First title	Last title
United States (USA)	28	29	57	1905	2016
Great Britain (GBR)	34	2	36	1884	1977
Germany (GER)	1	8	9	1931	2018
France (FRA)	6	2	8	1919	2013
Australia (AUS)	2	4	6	1963	2021
Czech Republic (CZE)	0	6	6	1998	2026
Brazil (BRA)	3	0	3	1959	1964
Spain (ESP)	0	2	2	1994	2017
Switzerland (SUI)	0	1	1	1997	1997
Russia (RUS)	0	1	1	2004	2004
Romania (ROU)	0	1	1	2019	2019
Kazakhstan (KAZ)	0	1	1	2022	2022
Poland (POL)	0	1	1	2025	2025

== See also ==
Wimbledon Open other competitions

- List of Wimbledon gentlemen's singles champions
- List of Wimbledon gentlemen's doubles champions
- List of Wimbledon ladies' doubles champions
- List of Wimbledon mixed doubles champions

Grand Slam women's singles

- List of Australian Open women's singles champions
- List of French Open women's singles champions
- List of US Open women's singles champions
- List of Grand Slam women's singles champions
