= 1884 in tennis =

This page covers all the important events in the sport of tennis in 1884. It provides the results of notable tournaments throughout the year on both the men's and women's ILTF tennis circuits.

== Australian Open ==
No event.

== French Open ==
Not a Grand Slam event.

== Wimbledon ==
Category	Champion(s)	Finalist(s)	Score
Men's singles	(United Kingdom) William Renshaw	(United Kingdom) Herbert Lawford	6–0, 6–4, 9–7
Women's singles	(United Kingdom) Maud Watson	(United Kingdom) Lillian Watson	6–8, 6–3, 6–3
Men's doubles	(United Kingdom) Ernest Renshaw (United Kingdom) William Renshaw	(United Kingdom) Ernest Lewis (United Kingdom) Teddy Williams	6–3, 6–1, 1–6, 6–4

== US Open ==
Category	Champion(s)	Finalist(s)	Score
Singles	(United States) Richard D. Sears	(United States) Howard Taylor	6–0, 1–6, 6–0, 6–2
Doubles	(United States) Richard D. Sears (United States) James Dwight	(United States) Walter Berry (United States) Alexander Van Rensselaer	6–4, 6–1, 8–10, 6–4
