= 1893 Wimbledon Championships – Women's singles =

Women's singles
- 1893 Wimbledon Championships

Final
- Champion: (United Kingdom) Lottie Dod
- Runner-up: (United Kingdom) Blanche Hillyard
- Score: 6–8, 6–1, 6–4

Details
- Draw: 7
- Seeds: –

Events
Singles	men	women
Doubles	men	women
← 1892 ·	Wimbledon Championships	· 1894 →

Blanche Hillyard defeated Maud Shackle 6–3, 6–2 in the All Comers' Final, but the reigning champion Lottie Dod defeated Hillyard 6–8, 6–1, 6–4 in the challenge round to win the ladies' singles tennis title at the 1893 Wimbledon Championships.

== Draw ==
=== Key ===
- Q = Qualifier
- WC = Wild card
- LL = Lucky loser
- Alt = Alternate
- SE = Special exempt
- PR = Protected ranking
- ITF = ITF entry
- JE = Junior exempt
- w/o = Walkover
- r = Retired
- d = Defaulted
- SR = Special ranking

=== Challenge round ===
Challenge Round
(United Kingdom) Blanche Hillyard	8	1	4
(United Kingdom) Lottie Dod	6	6	6

=== All Comers' ===
Quarterfinals
(United Kingdom) Edith Austin	6	6
(United Kingdom) S Robins	2	1
(United Kingdom) Maud Shackle	10	6
(United Kingdom) Ruth Legh	8	1
(United Kingdom) Charlotte Cooper	6	6
(United Kingdom) Henrietta Horncastle	4	1

Semifinals
(United Kingdom) Edith Austin	0	2
(United Kingdom) Maud Shackle	6	6
(United Kingdom) Charlotte Cooper	3	1
(United Kingdom) Blanche Hillyard	6	6

Final
(United Kingdom) Maud Shackle	3	2
(United Kingdom) Blanche Hillyard	6	6

Preceded by 1893 U.S. National Championships – Women's singles	Grand Slam women's singles	Succeeded by 1894 U.S. National Championships – Women's singles
