= 1891 Wimbledon Championships – Women's singles =

Women's singles
- 1891 Wimbledon Championships

Final
- Champion: (United Kingdom) Lottie Dod
- Runner-up: (United Kingdom) Blanche Hillyard
- Score: 6–2, 6–1

Details
- Draw: 9
- Seeds: –

Events
Singles	men	women
Doubles	men	women
← 1890 ·	Wimbledon Championships	· 1892 →

Lottie Dod defeated Blanche Hillyard 6–2, 6–1 in the all comers' final to win the ladies' singles tennis title at the 1891 Wimbledon Championships. The reigning champion Lena Rice did not defend her title.

== Draw ==
=== Key ===
- Q = Qualifier
- WC = Wild card
- LL = Lucky loser
- Alt = Alternate
- SE = Special exempt
- PR = Protected ranking
- ITF = ITF entry
- JE = Junior exempt
- w/o = Walkover
- r = Retired
- d = Defaulted
- SR = Special ranking

=== All Comers' ===
First round
(United Kingdom) Helen Jackson	6	7
(United Kingdom) Maud Shackle	4	5

Quarterfinals
(United Kingdom) Lottie Dod	6	6
(United Kingdom) Mrs Roberts	0	0
(United Kingdom) Bertha Steedman	6	6
(United Kingdom) Helen Jackson	2	2
(United Kingdom) May Langrishe	11	6
(United Kingdom) May Jacks	9	3
(United Kingdom) Blanche Hillyard	6	6
(United Kingdom) Ruth Legh	3	2

Semifinals
(United Kingdom) Lottie Dod	6	6
(United Kingdom) Bertha Steedman	3	1
(United Kingdom) May Langrishe	4	1
(United Kingdom) Blanche Hillyard	6	6

Final
(United Kingdom) Lottie Dod	6	6
(United Kingdom) Blanche Hillyard	2	1

Preceded by 1890 U.S. National Championships – Women's singles	Grand Slam women's singles	Succeeded by 1891 U.S. National Championships – Women's singles
