= 1886 Wimbledon Championships – Women's singles =

Women's singles
- 1886 Wimbledon Championships

Final
- Champion: (United Kingdom) Blanche Bingley
- Runner-up: (United Kingdom) Maud Watson
- Score: 6–3, 6–3

Details
- Draw: 8
- Seeds: –

Events
Singles	men	women
Doubles	men	women
← 1885 ·	Wimbledon Championships	· 1887 →

Blanche Bingley defeated Amy Tabor 6–2, 6–0 in the All Comers Final, and then defeated the reigning champion Maud Watson 6–3, 6–3 in the challenge round to win the ladies' singles tennis title at the 1886 Wimbledon Championships.

== Draw ==
=== Key ===
- Q = Qualifier
- WC = Wild card
- LL = Lucky loser
- Alt = Alternate
- SE = Special exempt
- PR = Protected ranking
- ITF = ITF entry
- JE = Junior exempt
- w/o = Walkover
- r = Retired
- d = Defaulted
- SR = Special ranking

=== Challenge round ===
Challenge Round
(United Kingdom) Blanche Bingley	6	6
(United Kingdom) Maud Watson	3	3

=== All Comers' ===
Quarterfinals
(United Kingdom) Maud Shackle	6	6
(United Kingdom) Julia Mackenzie	3	4
(United Kingdom) Amy Tabor	6	6
(United Kingdom) FM Pearson	1	2
(United Kingdom) Blanche Bingley	6	6
(United Kingdom) J Shackle	2	1
(United Kingdom) Lilian Watson	6	6
(United Kingdom) AM Chambers	3	3

Semifinals
(United Kingdom) Maud Shackle	4	5
(United Kingdom) Amy Tabor	6	7
(United Kingdom) Blanche Bingley	6	8
(United Kingdom) Lilian Watson	3	6

Final
(United Kingdom) Amy Tabor	2	0
(United Kingdom) Blanche Bingley	6	6
