= 1891 Wimbledon Championships =

- Date: 29 June – 9 July
- Edition: 15th
- Category: Grand Slam
- Surface: Grass
- Location: Worple Road; SW19, Wimbledon, London, United Kingdom
- Venue: All England Lawn Tennis Club

Champions

Men's singles
- (United Kingdom) Wilfred Baddeley

Women's singles
- (United Kingdom) Lottie Dod

Men's doubles
- (United Kingdom) Herbert Baddeley / (United Kingdom) Wilfred Baddeley
- Wimbledon Championships

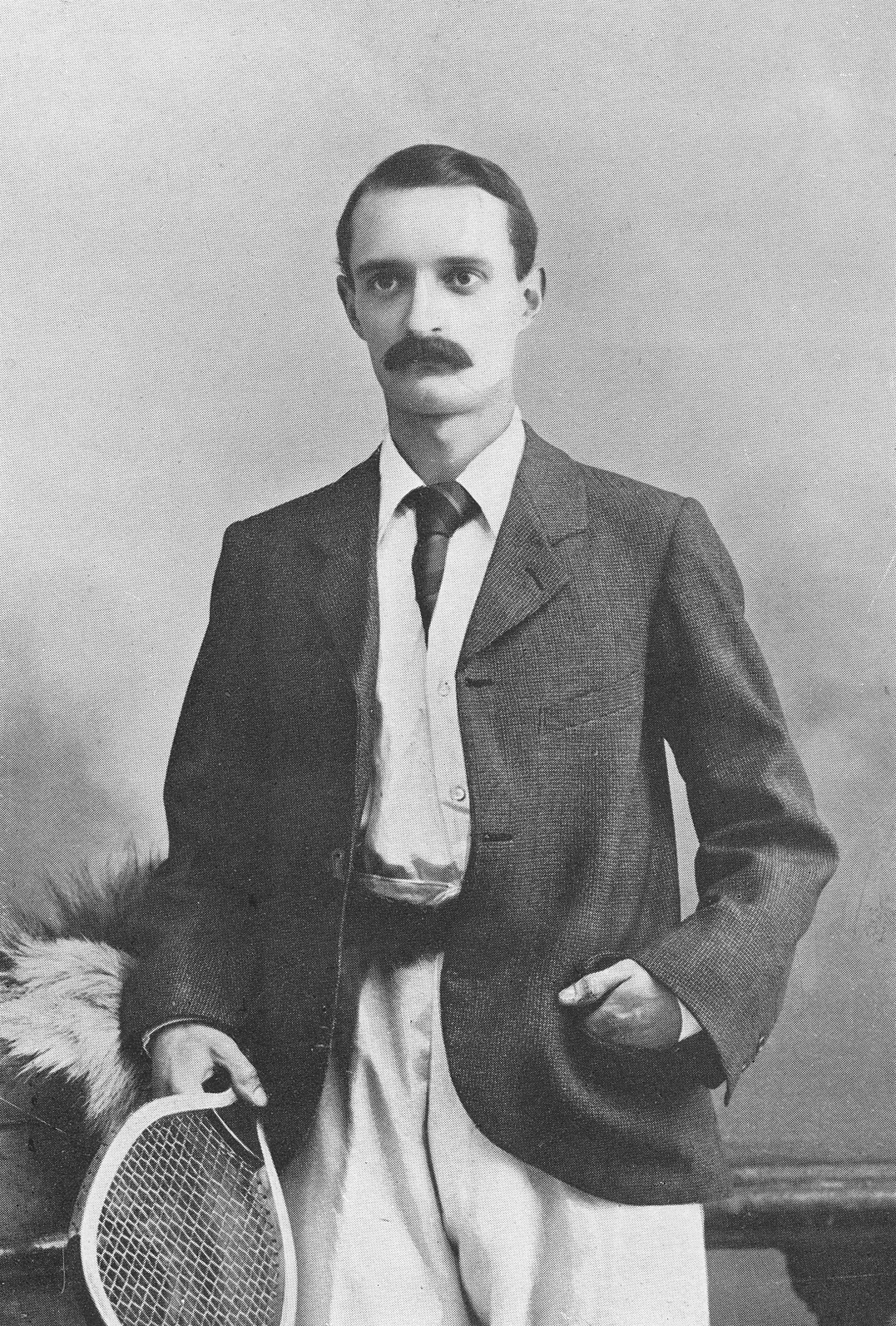
Wilfred Baddeley at 1891 Wimbledon Championships

The 1891 Wimbledon Championships took place on the outdoor grass courts at the All England Lawn Tennis Club in Wimbledon, London, United Kingdom. The tournament ran from 29 June until 9 July. It was the 15th staging of the Wimbledon Championships, and the first Grand Slam tennis event of 1891. There were 22 competitors for the men's singles. Wilfred Baddeley was 19 years, 5 months and 23 days old when he won the men's singles final on 4 July. The ladies' singles and men's doubles were held after the men's singles had been completed.

== Finals ==
=== Men's singles ===
(United Kingdom) Wilfred Baddeley defeated (United Kingdom) Joshua Pim, 6–4, 1–6, 7–5, 6–0

=== Women's singles ===
(United Kingdom) Lottie Dod defeated (United Kingdom) Blanche Hillyard, 6–2, 6–1

=== Men's doubles ===
(United Kingdom) Herbert Baddeley / (United Kingdom) Wilfred Baddeley defeated (United Kingdom) Joshua Pim / (United Kingdom) Frank Stoker, 6–1, 6–3, 1–6, 6–2

Preceded by 1890 U.S. National Championships	Grand Slams	Succeeded by 1891 U.S. National Championships
