= 1888 Wimbledon Championships =

- Date: 9 – 16 July
- Edition: 12th
- Category: Grand Slam
- Surface: Grass
- Location: Worple Road; SW19, Wimbledon, London, United Kingdom
- Venue: All England Lawn Tennis Club

Champions

Men's singles
- (United Kingdom) Ernest Renshaw

Women's singles
- (United Kingdom) Lottie Dod

Men's doubles
- (United Kingdom) Ernest Renshaw / (United Kingdom) William Renshaw
- Wimbledon Championships

The 1888 Wimbledon Championships took place on the outdoor grass courts at the All England Lawn Tennis Club in Wimbledon, London, United Kingdom. The tournament ran from 9 July until 16 July. It was the 12th staging of the Wimbledon Championships, and the first Grand Slam tennis event of 1888.

== Champions ==
=== Men's singles ===
(United Kingdom) Ernest Renshaw defeated (United Kingdom) Herbert Lawford, 6–3, 7–5, 6–0

=== Women's singles ===
(United Kingdom) Lottie Dod defeated (United Kingdom) Blanche Hillyard, 6–3, 6–3

=== Men's doubles ===
(United Kingdom) Ernest Renshaw / (United Kingdom) William Renshaw defeated (United Kingdom) Patrick Bowes-Lyon / (United Kingdom) Herbert Wilberforce, 2–6, 1–6, 6–3, 6–4, 6–3

Preceded by 1887 U.S. National Championships	Grand Slams	Succeeded by 1888 U.S. National Championships
