= Lawn Tennis Association =

Tennis governing body in Great Britain

- Sport: Tennis
- Abbreviation: LTA
- Founded: 26 January 1888
- Affiliation: Tennis Europe
- Regional affiliation: Europe
- Location: National Tennis Centre in Roehampton
- Chairman: Evan Mervyn Davies, Baron Davies of Abersoch
- CEO: Scott Lloyd

Official website
- www.lta.org.uk
- (United Kingdom)

The Lawn Tennis Association (LTA) is the national governing body of tennis in Great Britain, the Channel Islands, and the Isle of Man founded in 1888. The LTA promotes all levels of lawn tennis. The organisation believes tennis can provide "physical, social, and mental rewards both on and off the court." The National Tennis Centre (NTC) in Roehampton, southwest London, serves as its main training facility. The Princess of Wales has been an LTA patron since 2017.

== History ==
The British Lawn Tennis Association was formed in 1888, eleven years after the first Wimbledon championship. It was tasked with maintaining the new rules and standards of the emerging sport of tennis in the United Kingdom. Its first president was seven-time Wimbledon champion William Renshaw.

In 1978, a government inquiry was carried out into the state of British tennis, which accused the LTA of complacency and a lack of action in developing the game. During the 1980s and 1990s, several initiatives were launched in an attempt to raise the profile of tennis in the UK and to promote interest and participation in the sport outside of the Wimbledon fortnight. Millions of pounds were invested in building indoor centres, and on coaching and training initiatives. However, by the end of the 1990s, it was clear that these broad initiatives did not have the desired effect, so the LTA turned to more targeted approaches with the aim of attracting and keeping juniors in the game, changing the culture among clubs to become more "junior friendly"; identifying the best young players and helping them develop. This led to the launch in 2000 of Club Vision, a new strategy for providing greater support and resources to progressive tennis clubs, followed in 2001 by the City Tennis Club programme, specifically aimed at encouraging young players from diverse or deprived backgrounds in inner-city areas.

In 2004, the Lawn Tennis Association considered changing its name to "Tennis GB" to shake off its old-fashioned middle-class image, and attract more young people to the sport, but the proposed move was not implemented.

In March 2019, the LTA launched a new initiative called "Tennis Opened Up" to promote the sport to a wider audience, with a stated mission "to grow tennis by making it relevant, accessible, welcoming and enjoyable". Alongside the initiative, there was also a major rebranding strategy in which the full name "Lawn Tennis Association" was discarded and a new LTA logo was unveiled.

== The National Tennis Centre ==
The National Tennis Centre (NTC) is located at Roehampton in southwest London, close to the All England Club in Wimbledon. Officially opened in 2007 by Queen Elizabeth II, the NTC has 22 courts, and a sports science centre.

=== Tennis courts ===
The NTC has twelve acrylic hard courts (six indoor, six outdoor), six clay courts, and four grass courts.

Hard courts – The NTC's acrylic courts have a GreenSet Grand Prix Acrylic surface. The indoor courts have a sprung timber sub-frame, while the outdoor courts are laid directly on asphalt.

Clay courts – The NTC has two different types of outdoor clay courts which have been designed for the UK climate and to allow for long clay court playing seasons. There are four Italian clay courts (identical to the courts used at Foro Italico and Monte Carlo), and two French-Court synthetic clay courts.

Grass courts – The LTA consulted All England Lawn Tennis Club head groundsman Eddie Seaward to advise on the installation of its four outdoor grass courts. The quality and playing characteristics are intended to replicate those found at the Wimbledon Championships.

=== Training facilities ===
Along with its 22 tennis courts, the NTC is equipped with a gymnasium, outdoor sprint track, hydrotherapy, plunge pools and relaxation 'egg'. There is overnight accommodation for up to 54 people, along with a player lounge and recreation room.

=== Sports science centre ===
The Sports Science and Medicine team at the NTC is intended to support Britain's elite players with the following:

- Strength and Conditioning – Maximising players’ athletic potential through developing their power, strength, speed, movement and fitness.
- Medical and Physiotherapy – Supporting all aspects of physical health from short term illnesses and minor injuries through to long term injury rehabilitation.
- Performance Analysis – Developing players’ knowledge and understanding of their game and progress against their goals.
- Nutrition – Supporting and educating players to make the right food choices in order to fuel and repair their body effectively and perform to their best.
- Performance Lifestyle – Coaching and supporting players and their coaches/teams to navigate off court, personal, wellbeing or transition situations.
- Psychology – Supporting players and their coaches/teams to develop psychological skills and strategies to enhance on court performance.
- Mentally – Supporting your mental health to develop psychological skills and strategies to enhance on court performance.

== LTA Coaching Qualifications ==
The LTA is also responsible for administering and implementing tennis coaching at all levels in the UK. The current structure is as follows:

Level 1: Coaching Assistant – An introduction to tennis coaching. Level 1 coaches are qualified to plan and deliver a structured lesson under the guidance of an accredited coaches.

Level 2: Coaching Assistant – Level 2 Coaching Assistants are qualified to coach groups of beginners of any age, on their own, under the umbrella programme of an accredited coach.

Level 3: Coach qualification – Covers the key coaching skills required to work with beginners and improvers of any age in groups or individually. At this level they are then eligible to gain Coach Accreditation; this ensures they are up-to-date with the latest tennis knowledge, they are first-aid qualified and have a satisfactory criminal record check.

Level 4: Senior Club Coach qualification – Aimed at coaches who would like to manage a section of a commercial club or team of coaches.

Level 4: Senior Performance Coach qualification – This course is designed for coaches who wish to develop their knowledge and skills to develop international junior players aged 14 and under.

Level 5: Master Club Coach qualification – Upon completion of the course, a Master Club Coach will be able to deliver high quality on court sessions at clubs, mentor a team of coaches, and implement and assess a club programme.

Level 5: Master Performance Coach qualification – Master Performance Coaches are equipped to work with international performance junior players, aged 11 to 18 years. The course is designed to develop coaches to be versatile and transition between different performance players and environments.

== See also ==
- Tennis Scotland
- Tennis Wales
- List of British singles finalists at Grand Slam tennis tournaments
