= 1892 Wimbledon Championships – Women's singles =

Women's singles
- 1892 Wimbledon Championships

Final
- Champion: (United Kingdom) Lottie Dod
- Runner-up: (United Kingdom) Blanche Hillyard
- Score: 6–1, 6–1

Details
- Draw: 7
- Seeds: –

Events
Singles	men	women
Doubles	men	women
← 1891 ·	Wimbledon Championships	· 1893 →

Blanche Hillyard defeated Maud Shackle 6–1, 6–4 in the All Comers' Final, but the reigning champion Lottie Dod defeated Bingley Hillyard 6-1, 6-1 in the challenge round to win the ladies' singles tennis title at the 1892 Wimbledon Championships.

== Draw ==
=== Key ===
- Q = Qualifier
- WC = Wild card
- LL = Lucky loser
- Alt = Alternate
- SE = Special exempt
- PR = Protected ranking
- ITF = ITF entry
- JE = Junior exempt
- w/o = Walkover
- r = Retired
- d = Defaulted
- SR = Special ranking

=== Challenge round ===
Challenge Round
(United Kingdom) Blanche Hillyard	1	1
(United Kingdom) Lottie Dod	6	6

=== All Comers' ===
Quarterfinals
(United Kingdom) Bertha Steedman	6	6
(United Kingdom) Miss Barefoot	0	1
(United Kingdom) Maud Shackle	6	6
(United Kingdom) Helen Jackson	3	4
(United Kingdom) Blanche Hillyard	6	6
(United Kingdom) Beatrice Draffen	2	2

Semifinals
(United Kingdom) Bertha Steedman	4	3
(United Kingdom) Maud Shackle	6	6
(United Kingdom) Blanche Hillyard	1	6	9
(United Kingdom) A Martin	6	3	7

Final
(United Kingdom) Maud Shackle	1	4
(United Kingdom) Blanche Hillyard	6	6

Preceded by 1891 U.S. National Championships – Women's singles	Grand Slam women's singles	Succeeded by 1892 U.S. National Championships – Women's singles
