= 1894 Wimbledon Championships – Women's singles =

Women's singles
- 1894 Wimbledon Championships

Final
- Champion: (United Kingdom) Blanche Hillyard
- Runner-up: (United Kingdom) Edith Austin
- Score: 6–1, 6–1

Details
- Draw: 11
- Seeds: –

Events
Singles	men	women
Doubles	men	women
← 1893 ·	Wimbledon Championships	· 1895 →

Blanche Hillyard defeated Edith Austin 6–1, 6–1 in the all comers' final to win the ladies' singles tennis title at the 1894 Wimbledon Championships. The reigning champion Lottie Dod did not defend her title.

== Draw ==
=== Key ===
- Q = Qualifier
- WC = Wild card
- LL = Lucky loser
- Alt = Alternate
- SE = Special exempt
- PR = Protected ranking
- ITF = ITF entry
- JE = Junior exempt
- w/o = Walkover
- r = Retired
- d = Defaulted
- SR = Special ranking

=== All Comers' ===
First round
(United Kingdom) Constance Bryan	6	6
(United Kingdom) Miss Snook	2	4
(United Kingdom) Beatrice Draffen	6	6
(United Kingdom) Miss Morgan	2	2
(United Kingdom) Charlotte Cooper	6	6
(United Kingdom) Henrietta Horncastle	2	3

Quarterfinals
(United Kingdom) Blanche Hillyard	6	6
(United Kingdom) L. Chatterton Clarke	1	0
(United Kingdom) Constance Bryan	6	7
(United Kingdom) Beatrice Draffen	3	5
(United Kingdom) Edith Austin	6	3	6
(United Kingdom) Charlotte Cooper	1	6	3
(United Kingdom) S Robins	6	6
(United Kingdom) Mrs Edwardes	2	1

Semifinals
(United Kingdom) Blanche Hillyard	6	6
(United Kingdom) Constance Bryan	1	1
(United Kingdom) Edith Austin	6	6
(United Kingdom) S Robins	1	1

Final
(United Kingdom) Blanche Hillyard	6	6
(United Kingdom) Edith Austin	1	1

Preceded by 1893 U.S. National Championships – Women's singles	Grand Slam women's singles	Succeeded by 1894 U.S. National Championships – Women's singles
