= 1888 Wimbledon Championships – Women's singles =

Women's singles
- 1888 Wimbledon Championships

Final
- Champion: (United Kingdom) Lottie Dod
- Runner-up: (United Kingdom) Blanche Hillyard
- Score: 6–3, 6–3

Details
- Draw: 6
- Seeds: –

Events
Singles	men	women
Doubles	men	women
← 1887 ·	Wimbledon Championships	· 1889 →

Blanche Hillyard defeated Miss Howes 6–1, 6–2 in the All Comers' Final, and then the reigning champion Lottie Dod defeated Hillyard 6–3, 6–3 in the challenge round to win the ladies' singles tennis title at the 1888 Wimbledon Championships.

== Draw ==
=== Key ===
- Q = Qualifier
- WC = Wild card
- LL = Lucky loser
- Alt = Alternate
- SE = Special exempt
- PR = Protected ranking
- ITF = ITF entry
- JE = Junior exempt
- w/o = Walkover
- r = Retired
- d = Defaulted
- SR = Special ranking

=== Challenge round ===
Challenge Round
(United Kingdom) Blanche Hillyard	3	3
(United Kingdom) Lottie Dod	6	6

=== All Comers' ===
Quarterfinals			Semifinals			Final
			(United Kingdom) Miss Howes	6	6
(United Kingdom) D Patterson	6	6	(United Kingdom) D Patterson	4	2
(United Kingdom) Blanche Williams	0	3				(United Kingdom) Miss Howes	1	2
(United Kingdom) Blanche Hillyard	6	6				(United Kingdom) Blanche Hillyard	6	6
(United Kingdom) Miss Canning	2	2	(United Kingdom) Blanche Hillyard
			(United Kingdom) Miss Phillimore	w/o

Preceded by 1887 U.S. National Championships – Women's singles	Grand Slam women's singles	Succeeded by 1888 U.S. National Championships – Women's singles
