= 1891 Wimbledon Championships – Men's singles =

Men's singles
- 1891 Wimbledon Championships

Final
- Champion: (United Kingdom) Wilfred Baddeley
- Runner-up: (United Kingdom) Joshua Pim
- Score: 6–4, 1–6, 7–5, 6–0

Details
- Draw: 22
- Seeds: –

Events
Singles	men	women
Doubles	men	women
← 1890 ·	Wimbledon Championships	· 1892 →

Wilfred Baddeley defeated Joshua Pim 6–4, 1–6, 7–5, 6–0 in the all comers' final to win the gentlemen's singles tennis title at the 1891 Wimbledon Championships. The reigning champion, Willoughby Hamilton, did not defend his title.

== Draw ==
=== Key ===
- Q = Qualifier
- WC = Wild card
- LL = Lucky loser
- Alt = Alternate
- SE = Special exempt
- PR = Protected ranking
- ITF = ITF entry
- JE = Junior exempt
- w/o = Walkover
- r = Retired
- d = Defaulted
- SR = Special ranking

=== All comers' finals ===
Semifinals
(United Kingdom) Ernest Renshaw	0	1	1
(United Kingdom) Wilfred Baddeley	6	6	6
(United Kingdom) Harold Mahony	4	0	2
(United Kingdom) Joshua Pim	6	6	6

Final
(United Kingdom) Wilfred Baddeley	6	1	7	6
(United Kingdom) Joshua Pim	4	6	5	0

=== Top half ===
First round
(United Kingdom) Herbert Wilberforce
(United Kingdom) Manliffe Goodbody	w/o
(United Kingdom) Wilfred Baddeley
(United Kingdom) Frank Stoker	w/o
(United Kingdom) Herbert Chipp
(United Kingdom) Ernest Lewis	w/o

Second round
(United Kingdom) Ernest Renshaw	6	6	6
(United Kingdom) William Taylor	1	1	1
(United Kingdom) Harry Grove	6	8	5	2	6
(United Kingdom) Ernest Meers	4	6	7	6	3
(United Kingdom) Edward Avory	6	6	6
(United Kingdom) H Wilberforce	0	2	0
(United Kingdom) W Baddeley	6	6	6
(United Kingdom) H Chipp	4	0	4

Quarterfinals
(United Kingdom) E Renshaw	6	7	6
(United Kingdom) H Grove	3	5	2
(United Kingdom) E Avory	0	1	6	2
(United Kingdom) W Baddeley	6	6	4	6

Semifinals
(United Kingdom) E Renshaw	0	1	1
(United Kingdom) W Baddeley	6	6	6

=== Bottom half ===
First round
(United Kingdom) Arthur Gore	5	10	6	4	6
(United Kingdom) Herbert Baddeley	7	8	4	6	2
(United Kingdom) Harold Mahony	6	6	6
(United Kingdom) JE Kingsley	3	1	4
(United Kingdom) Horace Chapman	6	6	6
(United Kingdom) Arthur Chitty	1	0	3

Second round
(United Kingdom) A Gore	3	1	6	0
(United Kingdom) H Mahony	6	6	3	6
(United Kingdom) H Chapman	7	6	6
(United Kingdom) George Mewburn	5	0	1
(United Kingdom) Joshua Pim	6	6	6
(United Kingdom) Oswald Milne	3	3	4
(United Kingdom) Harry Barlow	6	6	7
(United Kingdom) Grainger Chaytor	1	2	5

Quarterfinals
(United Kingdom) H Mahony	6	6	6
(United Kingdom) H Chapman	2	0	1
(United Kingdom) J Pim	5	0	6	6	7
(United Kingdom) H Barlow	7	6	2	3	5

Semifinals
(United Kingdom) H Mahony	4	0	2
(United Kingdom) J Pim	6	6	6

Preceded by 1890 U.S. National Championships – Men's singles	Grand Slam men's singles	Succeeded by 1892 U.S. National Championships – Men's singles
