= 1885 Wimbledon Championships – Women's singles =

Women's singles
- 1885 Wimbledon Championships

Final
- Champion: (United Kingdom) Maud Watson
- Runner-up: (United Kingdom) Blanche Bingley
- Score: 6–1, 7–5

Details
- Draw: 10
- Seeds: –

Events
Singles	men	women
Doubles	men	women
← 1884 ·	Wimbledon Championships	· 1886 →

Maud Watson defeated Blanche Bingley 6–1, 7–5 to win the ladies' singles tennis title at the 1885 Wimbledon Championships.

== Draw ==
=== Key ===
- Q = Qualifier
- WC = Wild card
- LL = Lucky loser
- Alt = Alternate
- SE = Special exempt
- PR = Protected ranking
- ITF = ITF entry
- JE = Junior exempt
- w/o = Walkover
- r = Retired
- d = Defaulted
- SR = Special ranking

=== Draw ===
First round
(United Kingdom) Blanche Bingley	6	6
(United Kingdom) LM Nash	2	2
(United Kingdom) Jane Meikle	6	4	6
(United Kingdom) Lilian Watson	3	6	4

Quarterfinals
(United Kingdom) Blanche Bingley
(United Kingdom) Mrs Dransfield	w/o
(United Kingdom) Jane Meikle	5	4
(United Kingdom) Edith Gurney	7	6
(United Kingdom) EF Hudson	6	6
(United Kingdom) Constance Bryan	3	0
(United Kingdom) May Langrishe	0	2
(United Kingdom) Maud Watson	6	6

Semifinals
(United Kingdom) Blanche Bingley	6	6
(United Kingdom) Edith Gurney	1	2
(United Kingdom) EF Hudson	0	1
(United Kingdom) Maud Watson	6	6

Final
(United Kingdom) Blanche Bingley	1	5
(United Kingdom) Maud Watson	6	7
