= 1892 Wimbledon Championships – Men's singles =

Men's singles
- 1892 Wimbledon Championships

Final
- Champion: (United Kingdom) Wilfred Baddeley
- Runner-up: (United Kingdom) Joshua Pim
- Score: 4–6, 6–3, 6–3, 6–2

Details
- Draw: 27
- Seeds: –

Events
Singles	men	women
Doubles	men	women
← 1891 ·	Wimbledon Championships	· 1893 →

Joshua Pim defeated Ernest Lewis 2–6, 5–7, 9–7, 6–3, 6–2 in the All Comers' Final, but the reigning champion Wilfred Baddeley defeated Pim 4–6, 6–3, 6–3, 6–2 in the challenge round to win the gentlemen's singles tennis title at the 1892 Wimbledon Championships.

== Draw ==
=== Key ===
- Q = Qualifier
- WC = Wild card
- LL = Lucky loser
- Alt = Alternate
- SE = Special exempt
- PR = Protected ranking
- ITF = ITF entry
- JE = Junior exempt
- w/o = Walkover
- r = Retired
- d = Defaulted
- SR = Special ranking

=== Challenge round ===
Challenge Round
(United Kingdom) Joshua Pim	6	3	3	2
(United Kingdom) Wilfred Baddeley	4	6	6	6

=== All comers' finals ===
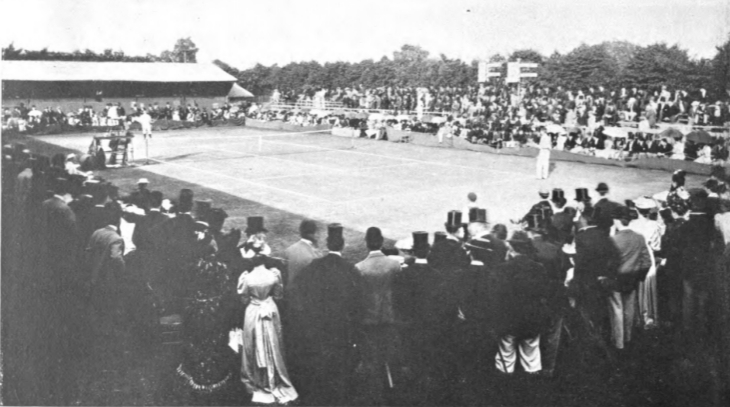
All-comers final between Pim and Lewis.

Semifinals
(United Kingdom) Ernest Lewis	2	6	6	6
(United Kingdom) Horace Chapman	6	3	1	2
(United Kingdom) Harold Mahony	1	10	6	2
(United Kingdom) Joshua Pim	6	12	2	6

Final
(United Kingdom) Ernest Lewis	6	7	7	3	2
(United Kingdom) Joshua Pim	2	5	9	6	6

=== Top half ===
First round
(United Kingdom) Wilberforce Eaves	6	6	6
(United States) Everett Colby	2	2	1
(United Kingdom) Herbert Baddeley	7	6	6
(United Kingdom) MR Wright	5	3	1
(United Kingdom) Reginald Gamble	5	6	6	6
(United Kingdom) William Taylor	7	4	4	0
(United Kingdom) H Colby	1	2	4
(United Kingdom) Edward Avory	6	6	6
(United Kingdom) Alfred Crawley	6	4	4	6	2
(United Kingdom) Oswald Milne	2	6	6	4	1^{r}
(United Kingdom) Horace Chapman	6	6	6
(United Kingdom) D Fuller	1	2	0

Second round
(United Kingdom) Ernest Lewis	8	6	6
(United Kingdom) George Hillyard	6	1	3
(United Kingdom) W Eaves	3	6	6	6
(United Kingdom) H Baddeley	6	2	0	1
(United Kingdom) R Gamble	6	2	6	6
(United Kingdom) E Avory	0	6	2	4
(United Kingdom) A Crawley	1	1	2
(United Kingdom) H Chapman	6	6	6

Quarterfinals
(United Kingdom) E Lewis	7	6	6
(United Kingdom) W Eaves	5	2	2
(United Kingdom) R Gamble	4	0	1
(United Kingdom) H Chapman	6	6	6

Semifinals
(United Kingdom) E Lewis	2	6	6	6
(United Kingdom) H Chapman	6	3	1	2

=== Bottom half ===
First round
(United Kingdom) Neville Durlacher	4	6	0	2
(United Kingdom) Harry Grove	6	1	6	6
(United Kingdom) Arthur Chitty	8	3	4
(United Kingdom) Harold Mahony	10	6	6
(United States) Oliver Campbell	6	6	8
(United Kingdom) FA Bowlby	4	3	6
(United Kingdom) JE Kingsley	3	6	2	2
(United Kingdom) Arthur Gore	6	4	6	6
(United Kingdom) Joshua Pim	8	6	6	6
(United Kingdom) James Crispe	10	1	4	3

Second round
(United Kingdom) H Grove	5	7	6	6	1
(United Kingdom) H Mahony	7	9	3	2	6
(United States) O Campbell	1	6	6
(United Kingdom) A Gore	6	8	8
(United Kingdom) J Pim	10	6	6
(United Kingdom) Ernest Meers	8	2	3
(United Kingdom) Harry Barlow	6	7	6
(United Kingdom) Archdale Palmer	1	5	1

Quarterfinals
(United Kingdom) H Mahony	4	6	6	6
(United Kingdom) A Gore	6	2	3	4
(United Kingdom) J Pim	3	9	6	7
(United Kingdom) H Barlow	6	7	2	5

Semifinals
(United Kingdom) H Mahony	1	10	6	2
(United Kingdom) J Pim	6	12	2	6

Preceded by 1891 U.S. National Championships – Men's singles	Grand Slam men's singles	Succeeded by 1893 U.S. National Championships – Men's singles
