= 1884 Wimbledon Championships =

- Date: 5 – 19 July
- Edition: 8th
- Category: Grand Slam
- Surface: Grass
- Location: Worple Road; SW19, Wimbledon, London, United Kingdom
- Venue: All England Lawn Tennis Club

Champions

Men's singles
- (United Kingdom) William Renshaw

Women's singles
- (United Kingdom) Maud Watson

Men's doubles
- (United Kingdom) Ernest Renshaw / (United Kingdom) William Renshaw
- Wimbledon Championships

The 1884 Wimbledon Championships took place on the outdoor grass courts at the All England Lawn Tennis Club in Wimbledon, London, United Kingdom. The tournament ran from 5 July until 19 July. It was the 8th staging of the Wimbledon Championships, and the first Grand Slam tennis event of 1884. The men's doubles (previously hosted by the Oxford University Club) and women's singles (originally planned by the London Athletic Club) were added to the Wimbledon Championships, but these were not started until after the men's singles competition had been completed. The first prize for the women was valued at twenty guineas, and the second prize was valued at ten guineas There were thirteen female competitors. James Dwight, Arthur Rives and Dick Sears from the United States entered the men's singles event and were the first non-British and overseas players to enter the Wimbledon Championships. The South Western Railway ran special trains to the ground from Waterloo and the temporary Stand A at the Centre Court was converted into a permanent and covered stand.

== Champions ==
=== Men's singles ===
(United Kingdom) William Renshaw defeated (United Kingdom) Herbert Lawford 6–0, 6–4, 9–7

=== Women's singles ===
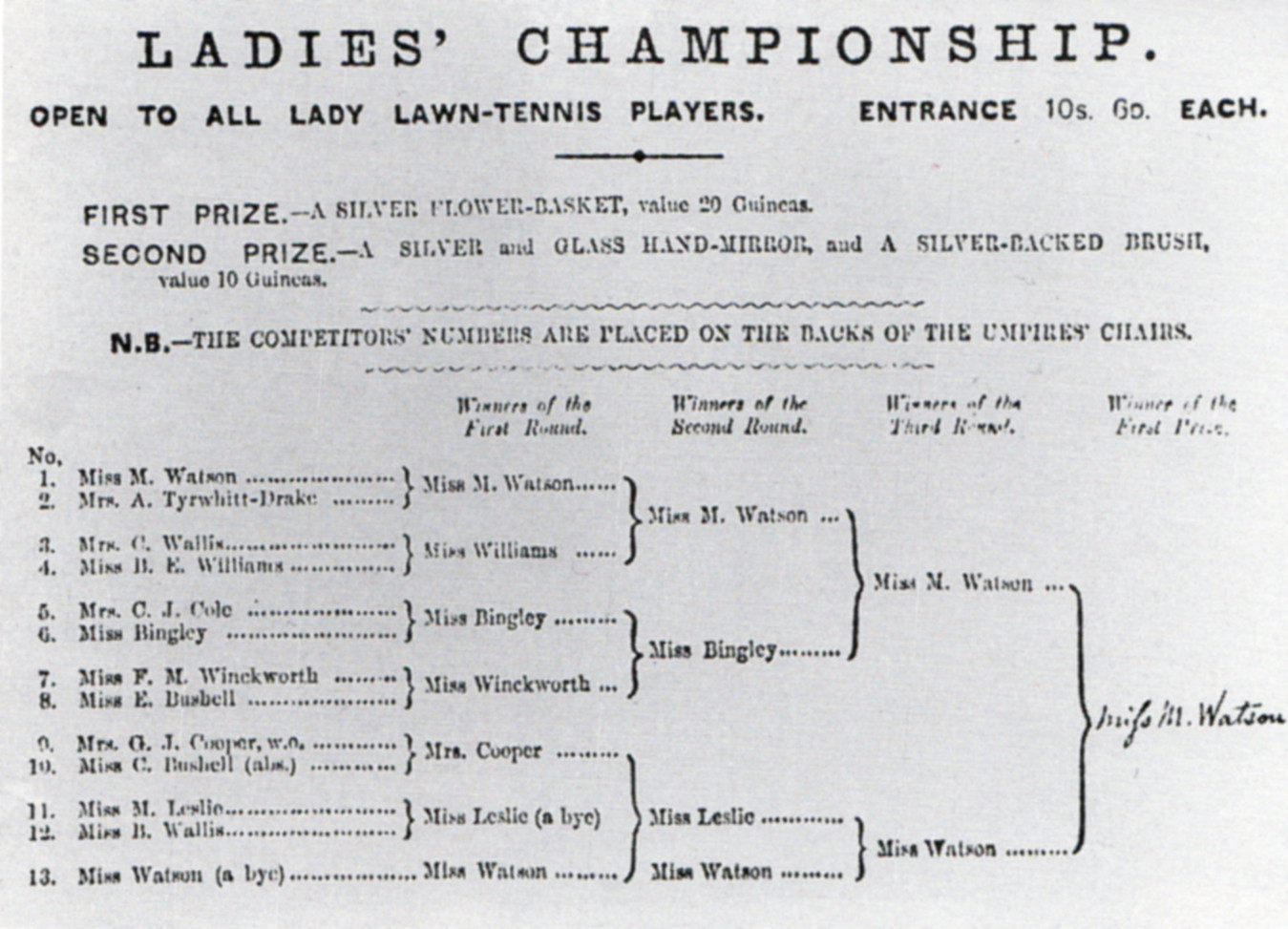
Ladies' programme, 1884

(United Kingdom) Maud Watson defeated (United Kingdom) Lillian Watson 6–8, 6–3, 6–3

=== Men's doubles ===
(United Kingdom) Ernest Renshaw / (United Kingdom) William Renshaw defeated (United Kingdom) Ernest Lewis / (United Kingdom) Teddy Williams 6–3, 6–1, 1–6, 6–4

Preceded by 1883 U.S. National Championships	Grand Slams	Succeeded by 1884 U.S. National Championships
