= 1885 Wimbledon Championships – Men's singles =

Men's singles
- 1885 Wimbledon Championships

Final
- Champion: (United Kingdom) William Renshaw
- Runner-up: (United Kingdom) Herbert Lawford
- Score: 7–5, 6–2, 4–6, 7–5

Details
- Draw: 23
- Seeds: –

Events
Singles	men	women
Doubles	men	women
- Wimbledon Championships

Herbert Lawford defeated Ernest Renshaw 5–7, 6–1, 0–6, 6–2, 6–4 in the All Comers' Final, but the reigning champion William Renshaw defeated Herbert Lawford 7–5, 6–2, 4–6, 7–5 in the challenge round to win the gentlemen's singles tennis title at the 1885 Wimbledon Championships.

== Draw ==
Key

- Q = Qualifier
- WC = Wild card
- LL = Lucky loser
- Alt = Alternate
- ITF = ITF entry
- PR = Protected ranking
- SR = Special ranking
- SE = Special exempt
- JE = Junior exempt
- JR = Junior Accelerator Programme entrant
- CO = College Accelerator Programme entrant
- NG = Next Gen Accelerator Program entrant
- w/o = Walkover
- r = Retired
- d = Defaulted

=== Challenge round ===
Challenge Round
(United Kingdom) Herbert Lawford	5	2	6	5
(United Kingdom) William Renshaw	7	6	4	7

=== All comers' finals ===
Semifinals
(United Kingdom) Ernest Renshaw	6	8	2	5	6
(United Kingdom) Ernest Browne	4	6	6	7	4
(United States) James Dwight	2	2	3
(United Kingdom) Herbert Lawford	6	6	6

Final
(United Kingdom) Ernest Renshaw	7	1	6	2	4
(United Kingdom) Herbert Lawford	5	6	0	6	6

=== Top half ===
First round
(United Kingdom) Wilfred Milne	8	2	6	7
(United Kingdom) Oswald Milne	6	6	3	5
(United Kingdom) Ernest Renshaw	6	2	4	8	6
(United Kingdom) Donald Stewart	1	6	6	6	4
(United Kingdom) MG MacNamara	6	6	6
(United Kingdom) JC Rogers	0	3	2
(United Kingdom) Ernest Browne	6	6	6
(United Kingdom) G Kerr	1	1	3

Second round
(United Kingdom) Herbert Chipp	6	6	6
(United Kingdom) W Milne	3	1	4
(United Kingdom) E Renshaw	6	6	6
(United Kingdom) CP Triscott	2	0	1
(United Kingdom) MG MacNamara	6	6	6
(United Kingdom) Ernest Meers	3	1	4
(United Kingdom) E Browne	6	2	6	7
(United Kingdom) Ernest Lewis	1	6	4	5

Quarterfinals
(United Kingdom) H Chipp	4	4	5
(United Kingdom) E Renshaw	6	6	7
(United Kingdom) MG MacNamara	1	5	2
(United Kingdom) E Browne	6	7	6

Semifinals
(United Kingdom) E Renshaw	6	8	2	5	6
(United Kingdom) E Browne	4	6	6	7	4

=== Bottom half ===
First round
(United States) James Dwight	6	6	6
(United Kingdom) E Cotton	4	2	3
(United Kingdom) George Montgomerie	7	6	2	2	6
(United Kingdom) William Taylor	5	4	6	6	4
(United Kingdom) Harry Grove	6	6	6
(United Kingdom) GN Stenhouse	4	0	0

Second round
(United States) J Dwight	6	6	6
(United Kingdom) Archibald Thomson	1	0	1
(United Kingdom) Arthur Stanley	4	6	6	6	6
(United Kingdom) G Montgomerie	6	3	8	0	0
(United Kingdom) Herbert Lawford	6	6	6
(United Kingdom) H Grove	3	2	1
(United Kingdom) Patrick Bowes-Lyon	6	6	3	8
(United Kingdom) Charles Ross	2	1	6	6

Quarterfinals
(United States) J Dwight	6	6	6
(United Kingdom) A Stanley	3	3	4
(United Kingdom) H Lawford	6	7	6
(United Kingdom) P Bowes-Lyon	2	5	3

Semifinals
(United States) J Dwight	2	2	3
(United Kingdom) H Lawford	6	6	6

Preceded by 1884 U.S. National Championships	Grand Slams men's singles	Succeeded by 1885 U.S. National Championships
