= Maud Shackle =

English tennis player

- Full name: Edith Maud Shackle
- Country (sports): United Kingdom
- Born: 4 August 1870; Hayes, England
- Died: 16 February 1962 (aged 91)
- Turned pro: 1886 (Amateur)
- Retired: 1895

Singles
- Career titles: 16

Grand Slam singles results
- Wimbledon: F^{(AC)} (1892, 1893)

Edith Maud Shackle (4 August 1870–16 February 1962) was an English tennis player active during the last decade and a half of the 19th century. She was a two time All-Comers finalist in singles at the Wimbledon Championships in 1892 and 1893. She was active from 1886 to 1895 and won 16 singles titles.

== Career ==
In 1889 Shackle won the singles title of the Kent Championships in Beckenham, defeating May Jacks in the final in straight sets. The next year, 1890, fortunes were reversed when Jacks beat Shackle in the final in three sets. In 1891 and 1892 it was again Shackle who won the title by defeating Jacks in the final, both times in three sets. Shackles's fourth and final title at Beckenham came in 1893 when she won in straight sets against Ruth Legh. Jacks and Shackle also met in the final of the 1891 women's singles events at the British Covered Court Championships. In 1890 Jacks had won the first edition of the women's singles event, played on wood courts at the Queen's Club in London, with the loss of only one game in the final. The following year, 1891, Shackle won the final against Jacks in straight sets. Shackle successfully defended her title in 1892 and 1893 against May Arbuthnot, each time in three sets.

Between 1886 and 1895 Shackle participated in five editions of the singles event at the Wimbledon Championships and achieved her best result in 1892 and 1893 when she reached the final of the all-comer's tournament. During both these years only seven women took part in the singles event and both times Shackle lost the all-comers' final in straight sets to Blanche Bingley, who on both occasions would lose the challenge round to Lottie Dod. She did not compete in the doubles or mixed doubles events at Wimbledon.

In 1894 Shackle was unable to defend her titles due to a family death.

Shackle was a baseline player and her game was based on accuracy and steadiness. She was the first known ambidextrous tennis player. In addition to lawn tennis she also competed in table tennis.
