= 1884 Wimbledon Championships – Men's singles =

Men's singles
- 1884 Wimbledon Championships

Final
- Champion: (United Kingdom) William Renshaw
- Runner-up: (United Kingdom) Herbert Lawford
- Score: 6–0, 6–4, 9–7

Details
- Draw: 28
- Seeds: –

Events
Singles	men	women
Doubles	men	women
- Wimbledon Championships

Herbert Lawford defeated Charles Walder Grinstead 7–5, 2–6, 6–2, 9–7 in the All Comers' Final, but the reigning champion William Renshaw defeated Herbert Lawford 6–0, 6–4, 9–7 in the challenge round to win the gentlemen's singles tennis title at the 1884 Wimbledon Championships. James Dwight, Arthur Rives, and Richard Sears were the first overseas players to compete at Wimbledon.

== Draw ==
Key

- Q = Qualifier
- WC = Wild card
- LL = Lucky loser
- Alt = Alternate
- ITF = ITF entry
- PR = Protected ranking
- SR = Special ranking
- SE = Special exempt
- JE = Junior exempt
- JR = Junior Accelerator Programme entrant
- CO = College Accelerator Programme entrant
- NG = Next Gen Accelerator Program entrant
- w/o = Walkover
- r = Retired
- d = Defaulted

=== Challenge round ===
Challenge Round
(United Kingdom) Herbert Lawford	0	4	7
(United Kingdom) William Renshaw	6	6	9

=== All comers' finals ===
Semifinals
(United Kingdom) Ernest Renshaw	6	4	2	3
(United Kingdom) Charles Grinstead	2	6	6	6
(United Kingdom) Herbert Chipp	5	4	4
(United Kingdom) Herbert Lawford	7	6	6

Final
(United Kingdom) Charles Grinstead	5	6	2	7
(United Kingdom) Herbert Lawford	7	2	6	9

=== Top half ===
First round
(United Kingdom) Wilfred Milne	6	6	6
(United Kingdom) JC Maxwell-Scott	1	4	3
(United Kingdom) WT Ryves	3	1	4
(United Kingdom) Oswald Milne	6	6	6
(United Kingdom) Ernest Renshaw	6	7	6
(United Kingdom) Teddy Williams	3	5	1
(United Kingdom) George Montgomerie	w/o
(United Kingdom) Brien Cokayne
(United Kingdom) Arthur Stanley	6	6	6
(United Kingdom) B Follett	0	3	1
(United Kingdom) Charles Grinstead
(United States) Richard Sears	w/o
(United Kingdom) AWM White	5	6	4	6	7
(United Kingdom) CJ Cramer-Roberts	7	0	6	2	5
(United Kingdom) Ernest Browne	6	6	7
(United Kingdom) Donald Stewart	3	1	5

Second round
(United Kingdom) W Milne	9	8	1	6
(United Kingdom) O Milne	7	6	6	3
(United Kingdom) E Renshaw	6	6	6
(United Kingdom) B Cokayne	2	1	4
(United Kingdom) A Stanley	8	4	3	3
(United Kingdom) C Grinstead	6	6	6	6
(United Kingdom) AWM White	0	1	0
(United Kingdom) E Browne	6	6	6

Quarterfinals
(United Kingdom) W Milne	3	3	5
(United Kingdom) E Renshaw	6	6	7
(United Kingdom) C Grinstead	5	4	7	6	6
(United Kingdom) E Browne	7	6	5	4	1

Semifinals
(United Kingdom) E Renshaw	6	4	2	3
(United Kingdom) C Grinstead	2	6	6	6

=== Bottom half ===
First round
(United Kingdom) FL Rawson	7	2	6	4	1
(United Kingdom) Patrick Bowes-Lyon	5	6	3	6	6
(United Kingdom) William Taylor	6	6	6
(United Kingdom) Ernest Wigram	1	3	1
(United Kingdom) Herbert Chipp	6	6	6
(United States) Arthur Rives	1	2	1
(United States) James Dwight	6	6	6
(United Kingdom) FJ Ridgway	2	1	1
(United Kingdom) Herbert Lawford	6	6	7
(United Kingdom) Herbert Wilberforce	1	3	5
(United Kingdom) John Redfern Deykin	w/o
(United Kingdom) RC Thompson

Second round
(United Kingdom) P Bowes-Lyon	6	6	5	4	7
(United Kingdom) W Taylor	3	3	7	6	9
(United Kingdom) H Chipp	6	2	6	3	7
(United States) J Dwight	1	6	3	6	5
(United Kingdom) H Lawford	6	6	6
(United Kingdom) RC Thompson	1	1	2

Quarterfinals
(United Kingdom) W Taylor	8	1	4
(United Kingdom) H Chipp	10	6	6
(United Kingdom) H Lawford
bye

Semifinals
(United Kingdom) H Chipp	5	4	4
(United Kingdom) H Lawford	7	6	6

Preceded by 1883 U.S. National Championships	Grand Slams men's singles	Succeeded by 1884 U.S. National Championships
