= Maud Watson =

English tennis player

Maud Watson MBE
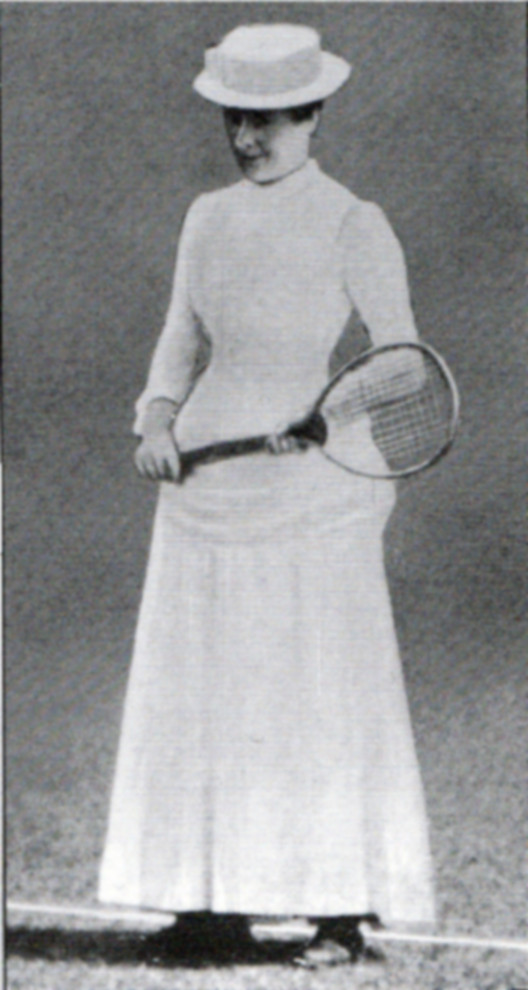
- Maud Watson in 1884-5
- Full name: Maud Edith Eleanor Watson
- Country (sports): United Kingdom
- Born: 9 October 1864 Harrow, Middlesex, England
- Died: 5 June 1946 (aged 81) Charmouth, Dorset, England
- Retired: 1889
- Plays: Right-handed

Grand Slam singles results
- Wimbledon: W (1884, 1885)

Maud Edith Eleanor Watson, MBE (9 October 1864 – 5 June 1946) was a British tennis player and the first female Wimbledon champion.

== Biography ==
Born in Harrow, Middlesex, the daughter of a local vicar Henry William and Emily Frances Watson. She learned to play tennis in the garden with her sister and did not find it difficult because she had already played squash racquets. At the age of sixteen Watson played her first match at the Edgbaston Cricket and Lawn Tennis Club. It was a successful debut, winning the singles competition by defeating her sister Lilian in the final and winning the doubles competition with her.

In 1884 Watson participated in the Irish Lawn Tennis Championships and defeated the reigning Irish champion May Langrishe 6–3, 6–2, 6–2. She was also victorious in the mixed doubles tournament winning the title with multiple Wimbledon champion William Renshaw. Undefeated in tournament play, in 1884 the nineteen-year-old Watson won the first-ever Ladies' Singles title at Wimbledon. Playing in white corsets and petticoats, from a field of thirteen competitors, she defeated Lilian 6–8, 6–3, 6–3 in the final to claim the title and a silver flower basket valued at 20 guineas.

1885 was a year of great success for Watson, who remained unbeaten in singles and lost only one set. She successfully defended her title at the 1885 Irish Championships against Louise Martin. For two sets, there was little to choose between them, but in the decider, Watson outlasted her opponent to win 6–2, 4–6, 6–3.

At the end of June 1885 she took part in the second major tournament of the year at the Northern Championships held in Manchester where she defeated Edith Davies in straight sets

In July 1885 she won the Wimbledon Championships. In a field of just 10 entries she easily won the quarter- and semi-finals and in the final defeated Blanche Bingley 6–1, 7–5. She became the first woman to win all three major titles in the same calendar year.

In 1886, the year the Challenge Round was introduced for women, Bingley turned the tables, defeating Watson 6–3, 6–3 in the final to take the title.

In 1887 and 1888 Watson, was handicapped by a sprained wrist, symptoms of such amplified with time. Her final competition came at the Edgbaston tournament in June 1889. She entered three events (doubles, mixed doubles and handicap singles) and won them all. While on holiday in Jersey she went swimming off the coast and nearly drowned. She was rescued with difficulty and suffered an illness afterwards which she took a number of years to recover completely from.

Maud Watson worked as a nurse during the First World War for which she was made a Member of the Order of the British Empire.

Watson, who did not marry, died on 5 June 1946, aged 81, at Hammonds Mead House in Charmouth.

== Grand Slam finals ==
=== Singles (2 titles, 1 runner-up) ===
Result	Year	Championship	Surface	Opponent	Score
Win	1884	Wimbledon	Grass	(United Kingdom of Great Britain and Ireland) Lillian Watson	6–8, 6–3, 6–3
Win	1885	Wimbledon	Grass	(United Kingdom of Great Britain and Ireland) Blanche Bingley	6–1, 7–5
Loss	1886	Wimbledon	Grass	(United Kingdom of Great Britain and Ireland) Blanche Bingley	3–6, 3–6

== Major finals ==
Result	Year	Championship	Surface	Opponent	Score
Win	1884	Irish Open	Grass	(Republic of Ireland) May Langrishe	6–3, 6–2, 6–2
Win	1885	Irish Open	Grass	(Republic of Ireland) Louisa Martin	6–2, 4–6, 6–3
Win	1885	Northern Champs	Grass	(England) Edith Davies	6–3, 6–3
Win	1886	Northern Champs	Grass	(England) Lottie Dod	7–5, 6–3
Loss	1887	Irish Open	Grass	(England) Lottie Dod	4–6, 3–6
Loss	1887	Northern Champs	Grass	(England) Lottie Dod	1–6, 2–6
