= 1884 Wimbledon Championships – Women's singles =

Women's singles
- 1884 Wimbledon Championships

Final
- Champion: (United Kingdom) Maud Watson
- Runner-up: (United Kingdom) Lilian Watson
- Score: 6–8, 6–3, 6–3

Details
- Draw: 13
- Seeds: –

Events
| Singles | men | women |
| Doubles | men | women |
| Wimbledon Championships | · 1885 → |

Maud Watson defeated her elder sister Lilian Watson 6–8, 6–3, 6–3 to win the inaugural Ladies' Singles tennis title at the 1884 Wimbledon Championships.

== Draw ==
=== Key ===
- Q = Qualifier
- WC = Wild card
- LL = Lucky loser
- Alt = Alternate
- SE = Special exempt
- PR = Protected ranking
- ITF = ITF entry
- JE = Junior exempt
- w/o = Walkover
- r = Retired
- d = Defaulted
- SR = Special ranking

=== Draw ===
First round
(United Kingdom) Maud Watson | 6 | 6
(United Kingdom) Mrs A Tyrwhitt Drake | 0 | 2
(United Kingdom) Mrs C Wallis | 2 | 1
(United Kingdom) BE Williams | 6 | 6
(United Kingdom) Edith Cole | 3 | 3
(United Kingdom) Blanche Bingley | 6 | 6
(United Kingdom) FM Winckworth | 6 | 6
(United Kingdom) E Bushell | 0 | 1
(United Kingdom) Mrs GJ Cooper
(United Kingdom) C Bushell | w/o
(United Kingdom) M Leslie | 6 | 6
(United Kingdom) B Wallis | 2 | 1

Quarterfinals
(United Kingdom) Maud Watson | 7 | 6
(United Kingdom) BE Williams | 5 | 0
(United Kingdom) Blanche Bingley | 6 | 6 | 6
(United Kingdom) FM Winckworth | 0 | 8 | 3
(United Kingdom) Mrs GJ Cooper | 5 | 7 | 3
(United Kingdom) Lilian Watson | 7 | 5 | 6
(United Kingdom) M Leslie
bye

Semifinals
(United Kingdom) Maud Watson | 3 | 6 | 6
(United Kingdom) Blanche Bingley | 6 | 4 | 2
(United Kingdom) Lilian Watson | 6 | 6
(United Kingdom) M Leslie | 4 | 1

Final
(United Kingdom) Maud Watson | 6 | 6 | 6
(United Kingdom) Lilian Watson | 8 | 3 | 3
