= Lilian Watson =

English tennis player

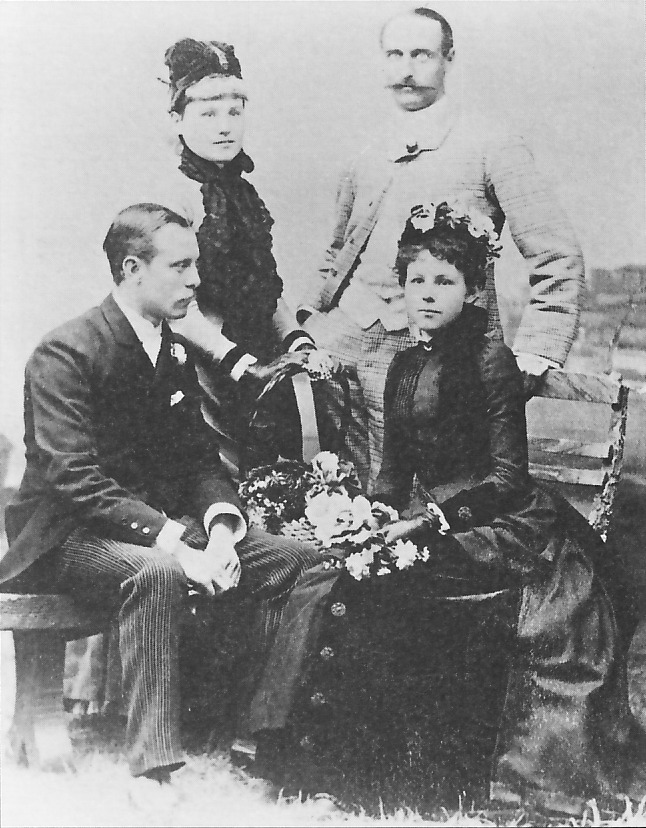
- Lilian Watson, standing on the left. Her sister Maud is sitting on the right.
- Full name: Lilian Mary Watson
- Country (sports): United Kingdom
- Born: 17 September 1857 Harrow, London, England
- Died: 27 May 1918 (aged 60) Berkswell, England

Grand Slam singles results
- Wimbledon: F (1884)

Lilian Mary Watson (17 September 1857 – 27 May 1918) was an English female tennis player.

== Biography ==
Lilian Watson was born on 17 September 1857 in Harrow, Middlesex, the daughter of a local vicar Henry William and Emily Frances Watson.

In 1881 she reached the final of the Edgbaston Open where she lost in three sets to her sister Maud Watson.

In 1883 she reached the final of the Teignmouth and Shaldon Open that was played on asphalt courts, but was defeated by Florence Mardall two sets to one.

In 1884, she and her younger sister Maud played in the first women's competition at the Wimbledon Championships. They met in the final which Maud won 6–8, 6–3, 6–3 to become Wimbledon's first female champion.

Lilian played at Wimbledon in the following two years. In 1885, she was defeated in the first round by Jane Meikle. In the same year, she won the doubles title at the Irish Championships alongside her sister Maud. In her final Wimbledon appearance in 1886 she reached the semifinals in which she was defeated by eventual champion Blanche Bingley.

She died on 27 May 1918, aged 60, at Berkswell.

== Grand Slam finals ==
=== Singles (1 runner-up) ===
Result	Year	Championship	Surface	Opponent	Score
Loss	1884	Wimbledon	Grass	(United Kingdom of Great Britain and Ireland) Maud Watson	8–6, 3–6, 3–6
