= Blanche Bingley =

English tennis player (1863–1946)

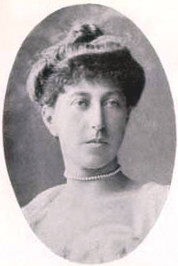
- Full name: Blanche Bingley Hillyard
- Country (sports): United Kingdom
- Born: 3 November 1863 Greenford, Middlesex, England
- Died: 6 August 1946 (aged 82) Pulborough, Sussex, England
- Plays: Right-handed
- Int. Tennis HoF: 2013 (member page)

Singles
- Career titles: 58

Grand Slam singles results
- Wimbledon: W (1886, 1889, 1894, 1897, 1899, 1900)

Grand Slam doubles results
- Wimbledon: 1R (1913)

Grand Slam mixed doubles results
- Wimbledon: 3R (1913)

Blanche Bingley Hillyard (née Bingley; 3 November 1863 – 6 August 1946) was an English tennis player. She won six singles Wimbledon championships (1886, 1889, 1894, 1897, 1898, 1900) and was runner up seven times, having also competed in the first Wimbledon championships for women in 1884.

She also won the Irish Championships three times (1888, 1894, 1897); the German International Championships twice (1897, 1900); and the South of England Championships at Eastbourne 11 times from 1885 to 1905.

== Early life ==
Bingley was born in Greenford, Middlesex, the daughter of a wealthy tailoring business proprietor. She was a member of the Ealing Lawn Tennis & Archery Club.

== Biography ==
=== Wimbledon ===
Her career at Wimbledon spanned almost 30 years, longer than any other woman's to date. In 1884, she competed in the first Wimbledon championships for women, and two years later, captured the first of her six singles titles. Also a seven-time losing finalist, Bingley's 13 finals remain a Wimbledon record as is the 14-year span between her first and last titles.

Bingley's Wimbledon record suggests that she was the second strongest female player of her day, only behind Lottie Dod, who defeated her in five finals.

After marriage to Commander George Whiteside Hillyard, she was usually listed in various records as Blanche Bingley Hillyard. At age 36, she again won the Wimbledon final and continued to compete until age 49, playing her last Wimbledon in 1913.

=== Other championships ===
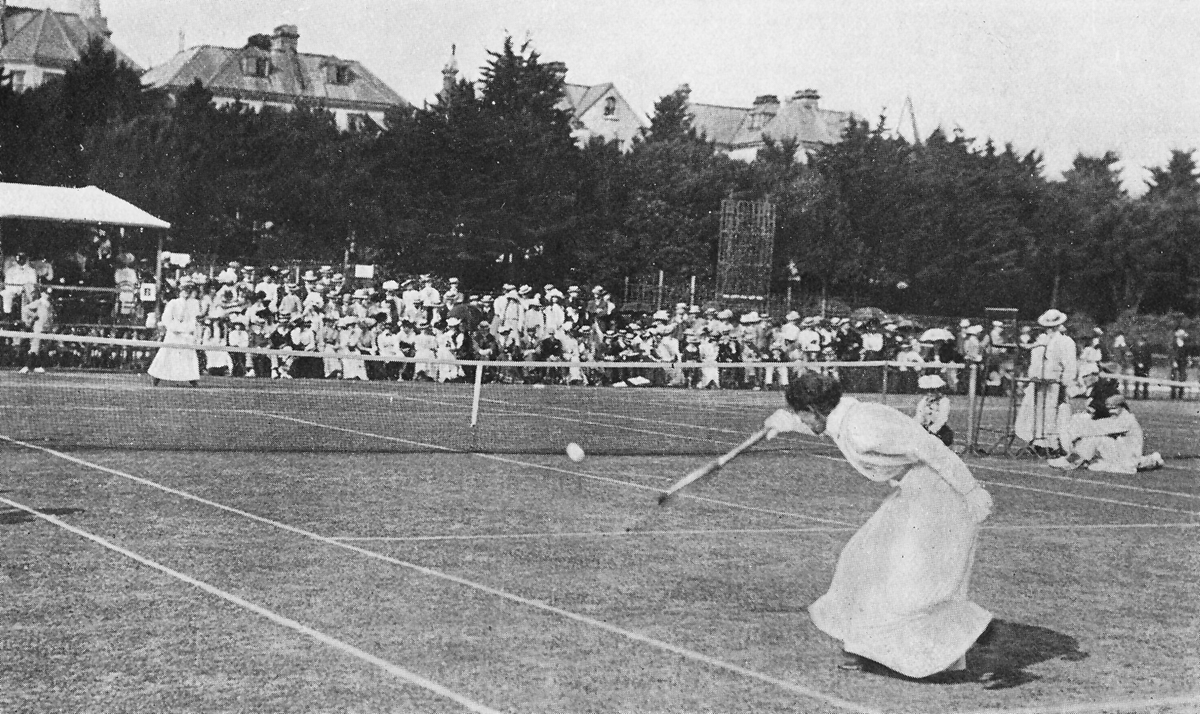
Blanche Bingley Hillyard vs Charlotte Cooper Sterry at Eastbourne

Bingley's first success came at the Middlesex Championships, held in Chiswick Park (west London) in 1884. She won the Irish Championships on three occasions (1888, 1894, 1897) and the German International Championships, played in Hamburg twice; in 1897, defeating Charlotte Cooper Sterry in the final in three sets, and in 1900 against Muriel Robb, also in three sets. Additionally, she won the South of England Championships at Eastbourne, then a major event, 11 times from 1885 to 1905. She also won the Sussex Championships at Brighton five times (1893–1896, 1900). She won the London Championships at Stamford Bridge three times (1886–1888), the Derbyshire Championships at Buxton six times (1888, 1893–1894, 1896, 1901, 1906), the Exmouth LTC Tournament two times (1887–1888) at Exmouth, the British Covered Court Championships (1901), the Bournemouth Open Tournament at Bournemouth (1901),

== Private life ==
She married Commander George Whiteside Hillyard in Greenford on 13 July 1887, one week after the Wimbledon final.

Her husband was one of the men's players on the international tennis circuit from 1886 to 1914. He also played first class cricket for Middlesex and Leicestershire. From 1907 to 1925, he was secretary of the All England Lawn Tennis Club and director of The Championships at Wimbledon from 1907 to 1925. He died in Bramfold, Pulborough on 24 March 1943.

== Death and legacy ==
Blanche Bingley Hillyard died at her home in Pulborough, West Sussex in 1946.

She was inducted into the International Tennis Hall of Fame in 2013.

== Grand Slam finals ==
=== Singles: 13 (6 titles, 7 runner-ups) ===
Result	Year	Championship	Surface	Opponent	Score
Loss	1885	Wimbledon	Grass	(United Kingdom of Great Britain and Ireland) Maud Watson	1–6, 5–7
Win	1886	Wimbledon	Grass	(United Kingdom of Great Britain and Ireland) Maud Watson	6–3, 6–3
Loss	1887	Wimbledon	Grass	(United Kingdom of Great Britain and Ireland) Lottie Dod	2–6, 0–6
Loss	1888	Wimbledon	Grass	(United Kingdom of Great Britain and Ireland) Lottie Dod	3–6, 3–6
Win	1889^{1}	Wimbledon (2)	Grass	(United Kingdom of Great Britain and Ireland) Helena Rice	4–6, 8–6, 6–4
Loss	1891^{3}	Wimbledon	Grass	(United Kingdom of Great Britain and Ireland) Lottie Dod	2–6, 1–6
Loss	1892	Wimbledon	Grass	(United Kingdom of Great Britain and Ireland) Lottie Dod	1–6, 1–6
Loss	1893	Wimbledon	Grass	(United Kingdom of Great Britain and Ireland) Lottie Dod	8–6, 1–6, 4–6
Win	1894^{2}	Wimbledon (3)	Grass	(United Kingdom of Great Britain and Ireland) Edith Austin	6–1, 6–1
Win	1897	Wimbledon (4)	Grass	(United Kingdom of Great Britain and Ireland) Charlotte Cooper	5–7, 7–5, 6–2
Win	1899	Wimbledon (5)	Grass	(United Kingdom of Great Britain and Ireland) Charlotte Cooper	6–2, 6–3
Win	1900	Wimbledon (6)	Grass	(United Kingdom of Great Britain and Ireland) Charlotte Cooper	4–6, 6–4, 6–4
Loss	1901	Wimbledon	Grass	(United Kingdom of Great Britain and Ireland) Charlotte Cooper	2–6, 2–6

^{1}This was the all-comers final as Lottie Dod did not defend her 1888 Wimbledon title, which resulted in the winner of the all-comers final winning the challenge round and thus Wimbledon in 1889 by walkover.
^{2}This was the all-comers final as Lottie Dod did not defend her 1893 Wimbledon title, which resulted in the winner of the all-comers final winning the challenge round and thus Wimbledon in 1894 by walkover. ^{3}This was the all-comers final as Helena Rice did not defend her 1890 Wimbledon title, which resulted in the winner of the all-comers final winning the challenge round and thus Wimbledon in 1891 by walkover.

== Grand Slam performance timeline ==
Key
W	F	SF	QF	#R	RR	Q#	DNQ	A	NH

(W) winner; (F) finalist; (SF) semifinalist; (QF) quarterfinalist; (#R) rounds 4, 3, 2, 1; (RR) round-robin stage; (Q#) qualification round; (DNQ) did not qualify; (A) absent; (NH) not held; (SR) strike rate (events won / competed); (W–L) win–loss record.

	1884	1885	1886	1887	1888	1889	1890	1891	1892	1893	1894	1895	1896	1897	1898	1899	1900	1901	1902	1903	1904	1905	1906	1907	1908	1909	1910	1911	1912	1913
Wimbledon	SF	F	W	F	F	W	A	F	F	F	W	A	A	W	A	W	W	F	2R	A	3R	SF	QF	SF	2R	2R	3R	A	SF	2R

== See also ==
- Performance timelines for all female tennis players since 1978 who reached at least one Grand Slam final
