= Lottie Dod =

English tennis player (1871–1960)

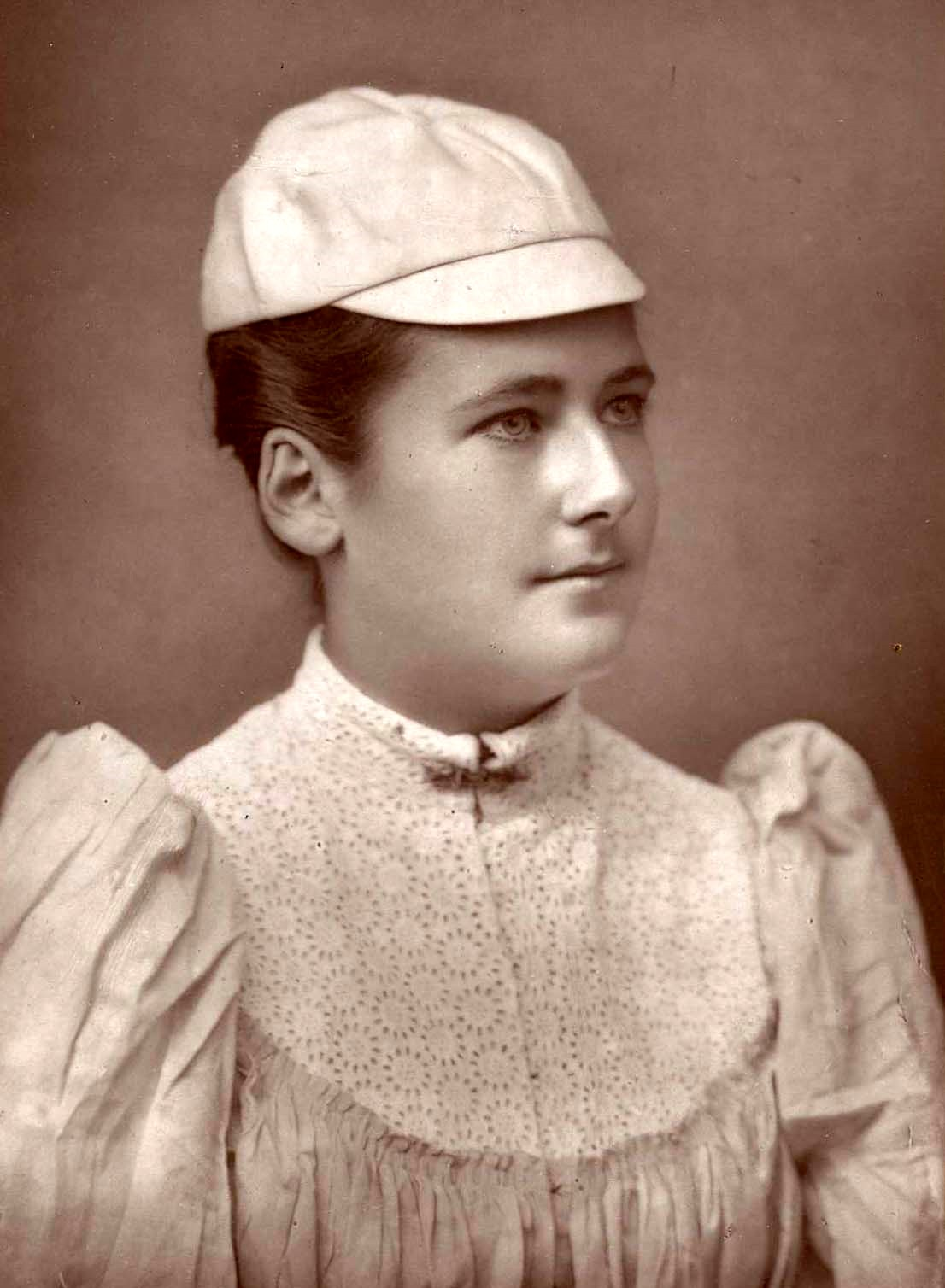
- Dod in 1891
- Full name: Charlotte Dod
- Country (sports): United Kingdom
- Born: 24 September 1871 Bebington, Cheshire, England
- Died: 27 June 1960 (aged 88) Sway, Hampshire, England
- Height: 5 ft 6.5 in (1.69 m)
- Plays: Right-handed
- Int. Tennis HoF: 1983 (member page)

Grand Slam singles results
- Wimbledon: W (1887, 1888, 1891, 1892, 1893)
Medal record
Women's Archery
Representing Great Britain
Olympic Games
Silver medal – second place	1908 London	Double National round

Charlotte Dod (24 September 1871 – 27 June 1960) was an English multi-sport athlete, best known as a tennis player. She won the Wimbledon Ladies' Singles Championship five times, the first one when she was only 15 in the summer of 1887. She remains the youngest ladies' singles champion.

In addition to tennis, Dod competed in many other sports, including golf, field hockey, and archery. She also won the British Ladies Amateur Golf Championship, played twice for the England women's national field hockey team (which she helped to found), and won a silver medal at the 1908 Summer Olympics in archery. The Guinness Book of Records has named her as the most versatile female athlete of all time, together with track and field athlete and fellow golf player Babe Zaharias.

== Early life ==
Dod was born on 24 September 1871 in Bebington, Cheshire, the youngest of four children to Joseph and Margaret Dod. Joseph, from Liverpool, had made a fortune in the cotton trade. The family was wealthy enough to provide for all members for life; Lottie and her brother Willy never had to work. Besides Willy, Lottie had a sister, Annie, and another brother, Tony, all of whom also excelled in sports. Annie was a good tennis player, golfer, ice skater and billiards player. Willy Dod won the Olympic gold medal in archery at the 1908 Games, and Tony was a regional level archer and a chess and tennis player. The Dod children received a private education by tutors and governesses. In her childhood Lottie played the piano, banjo and she was member of a local choir.

When Dod was nine years old, two tennis courts were built near the family's estate, Edgeworth. Lawn tennis, invented in 1873, was highly fashionable for the wealthy in England, and all of the Dod children started playing the game frequently. Tennis parties were occasionally organized and among the invited guests were future Wimbledon champions Joshua Pim and the brothers Herbert and Wilfred Baddeley. When she was eleven Dod joined the Rock Ferry Tennis Club in Birkenhead.

== Career ==
=== Tennis ===
Together with Annie, who was eight years her senior, Dod entered her first tennis tournament, the 1883 Northern Championships in Manchester, at age eleven. They had a bye in the first round and lost in the second round of the doubles tournament to Hannah Keith and Amber McCord, but won the consolation tournament. One journalist, Sydney Brown, noted that "Miss L. Dod should be heard of in the future". (Note: The article stated "Miss L. Dod should be heard of in the future, as though only an eleven year old, she showed really good form, and not only served well, but displayed tactics worthy of much older players. She played from the back of the court with both skill and judgement.") The following year, 1884, she participated in two tournaments, the Northern Championships, played that year in Liverpool, and Waterloo. With Annie she reached the doubles finals in both tournaments and with Tony she was defeated in the first round of the mixed doubles event at Waterloo. At the Northern Championships in 1885, she came to prominence when she nearly beat reigning Wimbledon champion Maud Watson in the final, losing 6–8, 5–7. Dod would win the doubles event (with Annie). Earlier she had won the first singles title of her career at the Waterloo tournament where she was also victorious in the doubles and mixed doubles events. These performances earned her the nickname "Little Wonder" in the press.

In 1886, Dod won the singles title at the West of England Championships in Bath where she defeated Watson in the final, ending the latter's run of 55 consecutive victories. That year, she played tournaments in Liverpool (Northern), Cheltenham and Derbyshire but won no further singles titles. In 1887, Dod became an established first-class player, illustrated by the fact she partnered the then seven-time Wimbledon doubles winner Ernest Renshaw at the mixed doubles event of the Irish Championships. She won the singles in Dublin defeating Watson in the final in straight sets. She again won the singles title at the Northern, defeating leading players Louisa Martin, May Langrishe and Watson without losing a set and conceding no more than two games per set.

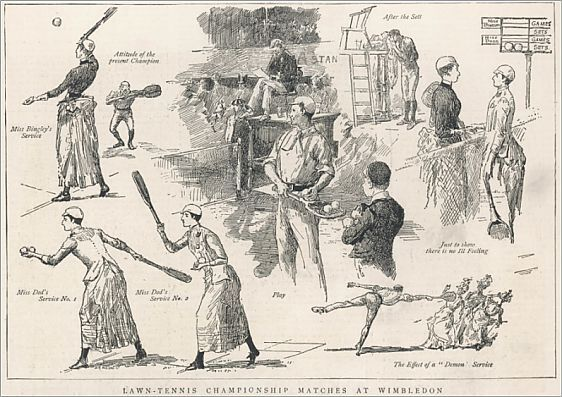
The ladies shake hands at the end of the Lawn-Tennis Championship Match at Wimbledon, 1887

Encouraged by these results, she decided to enter the 1887 Wimbledon Championships. Only six competitors, not having had included Martin and Watson, had entered. Dod had a bye in the first round and easily advanced through the semifinal and final of the All-Comer's tournament to earn the right to challenge the defending champion, Blanche Bingley. (Note: At the time, many tournaments were played in a format in which the final saw the defending champion facing a challenger, the player who had won all matches in the preliminary All-Comers tournament.) She defeated Bingley in straight sets 6–2, 6–0, the second set lasting just 10 minutes. At 15 years and 285 days, she is the youngest winner of the ladies' singles championships. During the match, Dod wore a metal-and-whalebone corset which punctured her skin and caused her to bleed as she played.

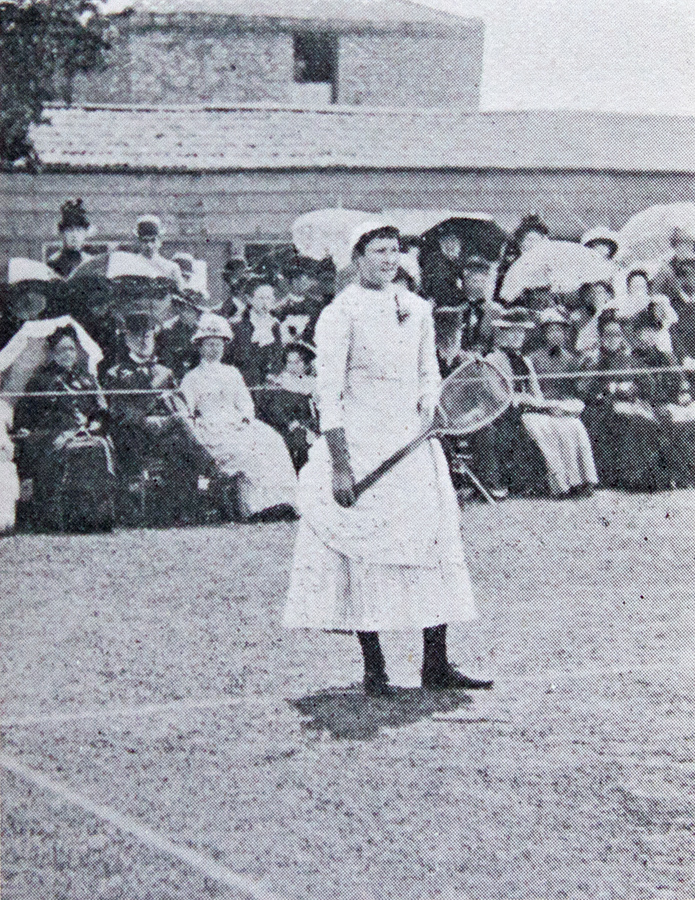
Lottie Dod

The two met again in the final of the 1888 West of England Championships. Although it was designated an "open" tournament, the officials made the remarkable decision to impose a handicap of 15 on Dod. (Note: Handicap tournaments were common at the time. In an attempt to even out the games, stronger players were given a penalty of one or more points. Handicap events were common in virtually all sports in the late 19th and early 20th century, but are nowadays only commonly found in golf above club level. They remain popular in tennis and archery at club level.) She still managed to win against her opponent, now known by her married name, Blanche Hillyard. The Wimbledon final of 1888 was a rematch of the previous year, and Dod, this time defending her title in the Challenge Round, again emerged victorious (6–3, 6–3). During that year she won several doubles and mixed doubles titles with her sister Annie, May Langrishe and Ernest Renshaw.

Lottie Dod's style of play, then regarded as unorthodox, now seems notably modern. She was perhaps the first player to advocate hitting the ball just before the top of the bounce and to adopt a modern, albeit single-handed, racquet grip. Her ground strokes were reported by contemporaries to be unusually firmly hit by the standards of the time, but – like many female players of the day – she served underhand and only rarely employed spin.

Dod only entered one open tournament in 1889 (the Northern Championships, which she won), and failed to attend Wimbledon, much to the disappointment of her fans. Together with Annie and some friends, she was on a sailing trip off the Scottish coast, and didn't want to return in time for Wimbledon. This was followed by a complete absence from the game in 1890.

After failing to do so in 1889, Dod was determined to win Wimbledon three times in a row, starting in 1891. Although it was her only competitive appearance of that season, she won her third Wimbledon title by defeating Hillyard (6–2, 6–1) in the final of the All-Comers tournament. The reigning champion Lena Rice did not defend her title. 1892 saw Dod's first singles defeat in an open tournament since 1886 when she lost to Louisa Martin of Ireland in the second round of the Irish Championships. It was the last of only five losses in her entire tennis career and her only defeat after the age of 15. She continued the year strongly, culminating in another easy straight-set Wimbledon victory over Hillyard. Dod's last tennis season as a competitive player was 1893, and she played in just two tournaments, The Northern in Manchester and Wimbledon, winning both. On both occasions, she defeated Blanche Hillyard in three sets despite a heavy fall in the Wimbledon final. Her record of five Wimbledon titles would not last for long, as Hillyard, after losing in the final to Dod five times, won her sixth title in 1900. Suzanne Lenglen broke Dod's record of three consecutive singles wins by winning from 1919 to 1923.

Apart from entering women's tournaments, Dod sometimes played and won matches against men (who usually played with a handicap), and on one occasion defeated star players Ernest Renshaw and George Hillyard (the husband of Blanche) when doubling with Herbert Baddeley.

=== Winter sports ===
Although tennis would remain Dod's favourite sport, she shifted her attention to other activities in the following years. In 1895, she joined her brother Tony on a trip to the winter sports resort of St. Moritz, which was very popular with English travellers. There, she passed the St. Moritz Ladies's Skating Test, the most prestigious figure skating event for women at the time. Dod also rode the toboggan on the famous Sankt Moritz Cresta Run, and began mountaineering with her brother, climbing two mountains over 4,000 m in February 1896.

After a long cycling trip in Italy, Lottie and Tony returned to England, only to come back to St Moritz in November, now accompanied by their mother and brother Willy. This time, Dod took the St. Moritz Men's Skating Test and passed, as the second woman ever. She also competed in curling. In the summer of 1897, she and Tony again ascended several mountains, this time in Norway.

=== Field hockey ===
The sport of women's field hockey was still rather young when Dod took up the game in 1897. She was one of the founding members of a women's hockey club in Spital. Playing as a central forward, she was soon named captain of the team. Club matches in which Dod played were won, while losses happened only in her absence.

By 1899, Dod had made it to captain of the Cheshire county team, and represented her club at meetings of the women's hockey association for the northern counties. She first played in the English national team on 21 March that year, winning 3–1 over Ireland. Both English goals in the 1900 England and Ireland rematch were scored by Dod, securing a 2–1 victory. Dod failed to attend the match against Wales, suffering from sciatica attacks which kept her from sporting for months.

Although she had recovered by 1901, Dod would not play again in national or county matches. All members of the Dod family stopped attending sports events for a while after their mother died on 1 August 1901, and Dod apparently lost her interest in field hockey during that period, although she did occasionally play for Spital Club until 1905.

=== Golf ===
Few golf clubs allowed women to play around the time Lottie Dod first played golf at age fifteen. Unlike tennis, Dod found golf a difficult sport to master. By the time she got seriously interested in the sport, the Ladies Golf Union (LGU) had been founded, and women's golf had become a real sport.

Dod helped establish a ladies' golf club at Moreton in 1894 and entered that year's National Championships (match play) at Littlestone (Kent). She was eliminated in the third round, but Dod's interest in the sport grew, and she became a regular competitor in the National Championships and other tournaments for the next few years. In 1898 and 1900 she reached the semi-finals of the National Championships, but was defeated narrowly both times. In 1900, she also played in an unofficial country match against Ireland, which the English won 37–18.

Dod did not compete in golf in 1901, and hardly entered major tournaments in the next two years, but she did play in the 1904 British Ladies Amateur, held at Troon. She qualified for the semi-finals for the third time in her life, and won it for the first time. Her opponent in the final was May Hezlet, the champion of 1899 and 1902. The match was very close, and the two were tied after 17 holes. Hezlet missed her putt on the final hole narrowly, after which Dod grabbed an unexpected victory, becoming the first, and to date only, woman to win British tennis and golf championships.

Following her victory, Dod sailed to Philadelphia, where she had been invited by Frances C. Griscom, a former American golf champion, to attend the U.S. Women's Amateur as a spectator. Upon arrival, Dod found out the tournament regulations had been changed to allow for non-Americans to compete, and she was requested to compete. Her loss in the first round was a disappointment, but Dod persuaded several Americans to come and play in the British championships the following year.

In the week before these 1905 championships, three international matches were planned, starting off with the first British-American international match. Dod was the only British player to lose a match, as the United Kingdom won 6–1. Dod then played for the English team in a 3–4 defeat against Scotland and a 4–3 win over Ireland, although she lost both her matches. Dod was then eliminated in the fourth round of the National Championships. It was to be her last appearance in golf.

=== Archery ===
In the autumn of 1905, Dod and her brothers sold "Edgeworth" and moved to a new home near Newbury, Berkshire. They had been practising archery from the times before, but all three became more serious now and joined the Welford Park Archers in Newbury. As one of their ancestors was said to have commanded the English longbowmen at the Battle of Agincourt, they found this an appropriate sport.

Lottie Dod won her first tournament by 1906, and finished fifth in the Grand National Archery Meeting of 1906, 1907 and 1908. Dod's performances in the 1908 season earned her a spot on the British Olympic team. The field in the women's archery event consisted only of British women, but without the best archer of the era, Alice Legh. Dod led the competition, held in rainy conditions, after the first day but was surpassed by Queenie Newall on the second day, eventually taking second place with 642 points to Newall's 688. Her brother Willy fared better and surprisingly secured the gold medal in the men's competition.

In 1910, Dod came close to winning the Grand National, which would have made archery the third sport in which she became a national champion. Both Lottie and her brother William led after day one, but moved down to second on the final competition day. After the Welford Archers were disbanded in late 1911, the Dods' interest in archery faded, meaning the end of Lottie Dod's long competitive sports career.

=== Later life ===
In 1913, Lottie and Willy moved to a new house in Bideford. When World War I broke out, Lottie worked for the British Red Cross from November 1916 at Chelsea VAD Hospital and in a military hospital in Speen, Berkshire.

Dod wanted to be transferred to the war zones in France but was hampered by sciatica and never served as a nurse outside England. She did receive a Service Medal by the Red Cross for serving more than 1,000 hours during the war.

She then lived in London and Devon, and she never failed to attend the Wimbledon Championships until she was in her late 80s. After her brother Willy died in 1954, she lived in several nursing homes on the English south coast, eventually settling at the Birchy Hill Nursing Home in Sway, Hampshire.

== Death and legacy ==
In 1960, Dod died, unmarried, at age 88, dying while listening to the Wimbledon radio broadcasts in bed in Sway, Hampshire.

Dod has been remembered since her death. Dod was elected to the International Tennis Hall of Fame in 1983. In May 2024, "The Lottie Dod" public house opened on the site of a former Wetherspoon's in Moreton.

== Grand slam finals ==
Result	Year	Championship	Surface	Opponent	Score
Win	1887	Wimbledon	Grass	(United Kingdom) Blanche Bingley Hillyard	6–2, 6–0
Win	1888	Wimbledon	Grass	(United Kingdom) Blanche Bingley Hillyard	6–3, 6–3
Win	1891 (Note: This was actually the all-comers final as Helena Rice did not defend her 1890 Wimbledon title, such resulting in the winner of the All-Comers' final actually having won the challenge round and, thus, Wimbledon in 1891 by walkover.)	Wimbledon	Grass	(United Kingdom) Blanche Bingley Hillyard	6–2, 6–1
Win	1892	Wimbledon	Grass	(United Kingdom) Blanche Bingley Hillyard	6–1, 6–1
Win	1893	Wimbledon	Grass	(United Kingdom) Blanche Bingley Hillyard	6–8, 6–1, 6–4

== Sources ==
- Cook, Theodore Andrea (1908). The Fourth Olympiad, Being the Official Report. London: British Olympic Association.
- De Wael, Herman (2001). "Archery 1908". Herman's Full Olympians.
- Pearson, Jeffrey (1988). Lottie Dod – Champion of Champions – Story of an Athlete. Wirral: Countyvise Limited. ISBN 0-907768-26-1.
