= 1884 men's tennis season =

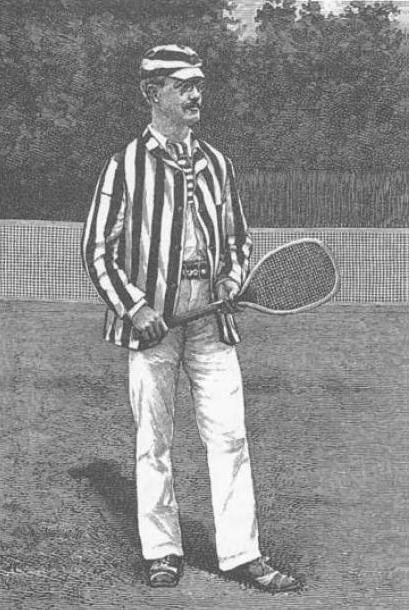
- Richard Sears pictured wins his 4th consecutive U.S. National Championships this year

Details
- Duration: 6 May – 21 December
- Tournaments: 71
- Categories: Important (4); National (4); Provincial/Regional/State (8); County (11); Local/other (44)

Achievements (singles)
- Most titles: (United Kingdom) Charles Walder Grinstead (5)
- Most finals: (United Kingdom) Charles Walder Grinstead (6)

The 1884 men's tennis season was the ninth annual tennis season consisting of 70 world wide tournaments. The season began in April in Nuwara Eliya, Ceylon and ended in December in Melbourne, Australia.

== Season summary ==
Herbert Lawford wins the Irish Lawn Tennis Championships at his 3rd attempt in Dublin defeating Ernest Renshaw in straight sets. William Renshaw a fourth consecutive Wimbledon Championship. Former Wimbledon champion Donald Stewart wins the Northern Championship in Liverpool against Herbert Wilberforce. In America Richard Sears collects a fourth successive US National Championship beating Howard Taylor in straight sets.

The title leader this season was Charles Walder Grinstead winning 5 tournaments from 5 finals.

== Season results ==
Notes 1: Challenge Round: the final round of a tournament, in which the winner of a single-elimination phase faces the previous year's champion, who plays only that one match. The challenge round was used in the early history of tennis (from 1877 through 1921), in some tournaments not all.

* Indicates challenger

Key

Important.
National
Provincial/State/Regional
County
Local

The 1884 season included:

=== January ===
No events

=== February ===
No events

=== March ===
'No events

=== April ===
Date	Tournament	Winner	Finalist	Semi-finalist	Quarter-finalist
April. (Note: The Ceylon Championships were staged at the Hill Club LTC, Nuwara Eliya, Ceylon from 1884 until 1971. In 1972 following independence Ceylon's name changed to Sri Lanka and this tournament was then called the Sri Lankan Championships until 1976.)	Ceylon Championships; Nuwara Eliya Lawn Tennis Club; Nuwara Eliya, Ceylon; Grass; Singles – Doubles	(United Kingdom) Charles Hoadley Ashe Ross ?	?	?	?

=== May ===
Date	Tournament	Winner	Finalist	Semi finalist	Quarter finalist
16 - 17 May.	Clyde Park Tournament; Boston; United States; Grass	(United States) William V.S. Thorne; 77–73 (games)	(United States) Percy Knapp	(United States) Palmer Ellis Presbrey (United States) Howard Augustus Taylor	
12 - 17 May.	Fitzwilliam Club Championships; Fitzwilliam Lawn Tennis Club; Dublin, Ireland; Grass	(Ireland) Ernest Browne ?	(Ireland) ?		
14 - 19 May	Irish Lawn Tennis Championships; Dublin, Ireland; Grass	(Scotland) Herbert Lawford; 6-1 6-4 6-2	(Ireland) Eyre Chatterton	(Ireland) Herbert Knox McKay	(Ireland) Willoughby Hamilton (United States) Richard D. Sears
14 - 19 May	Irish Lawn Tennis Championships; Dublin, Ireland; Grass	Challenger (United Kingdom of Great Britain and Ireland) Ernest Renshaw		(Ireland) Herbert Knox McKay	(Ireland) Willoughby Hamilton (United States) Richard D. Sears
14 - 19 May	Irish Lawn Tennis Championships; Dublin, Ireland; Grass	(England) William Renshaw** (England) Maud Watson; 6-0, 8-6, 6-3	(Scotland) Robert Galbraith Horn (Ireland) Connie Butler	(Ireland) Herbert Knox McKay	(Ireland) Willoughby Hamilton (United States) Richard D. Sears
19 - 24 May.	Fitzwilliam Purse; Fitzwilliam Lawn Tennis Club; Dublin, Ireland; Grass	(England) Ernest Wool Lewis; 6-1, 1-6, 6-2	(Ireland) Robert Shaw Templer	(Ireland) William Drummond Hamilton	(Ireland) Toler Roberts Garvey (United Kingdom of Great Britain and Ireland) J.Butler Robinson
21 - 24 May.	Whitehouse Open; Whitehouse Lawn Tennis Club; Edinburgh, Lothian, Scotland; Outdoor; Grass	(United Kingdom of Great Britain and Ireland) Richard Henry Fuller; 6-4 6-3 6-3	(Scotland) Archibald Thomson	(United Kingdom of Great Britain and Ireland) A. Dunn jr.	(United Kingdom of Great Britain and Ireland) Walter William Chamberlain (Scotland) Charles Robert Andrew Howden (Scotland) Patrick Smith

=== June ===
Date	Tournament	Winner	Finalist	Semi finalist	Quarter finalist
June.	Oxford University Champion Tournament; Norham Gardens, Oxford, Great Britain; Grass; Singles – Doubles	? ?	?		
2 - 6 June	West of England Championships; Bath; Great Britain; Grass	(United Kingdom of Great Britain and Ireland) Ernest de Sylly H. Browne; 6-4, 6-2, 6-4	(United Kingdom of Great Britain and Ireland) C.K. Wood	(United Kingdom of Great Britain and Ireland) John Redfern Deykin	(England) Wilfred Milne (Ireland) Ernest Browne (United Kingdom of Great Britain and Ireland) Donald Charles Stewart
9 - 15 June	Waterloo Tournament; Liverpool, Great Britain; Grass; Singles - Doubles	(United Kingdom of Great Britain and Ireland) Donald Stewart; 9-7 6-1 6-2	(United Kingdom of Great Britain and Ireland) William Bush-Salmon	(United Kingdom of Great Britain and Ireland) Richard Taswell Richardson	(United Kingdom of Great Britain and Ireland) Theodore Robson Eskrigge (United Kingdom of Great Britain and Ireland) Joseph Bruce Ismay
16 - 22 June	East Gloucestershire Championships; Cheltenham, Great Britain; Hard; Singles - Doubles	(United Kingdom) Donald Charles Stewart; 10-8 6-1 6-3	(United States) Richard Dudley Sears	(England) Wilfred Milne	(United Kingdom of Great Britain and Ireland) C.K. Wood (Ireland) Frederick William Knox
16 - 22 June	London Athletic Club Tournament; Cheltenham, Great Britain; Grass; Singles - Doubles	(United Kingdom of Great Britain and Ireland) Herbert Lawford; 6-3 6-1 3-6 6-2	(United Kingdom of Great Britain and Ireland) Frederick Bowlby	(United Kingdom) Teddy Williams (Scotland) William C. Taylor	(United Kingdom) Herbert Chipp (England) Edward Charles Pine-Coffin (England) Harry Grove (United Kingdom) Arthur John Stanley
19 - 21 June.	Fall Open Tournament Far and Near LTC; Far and Near Lawn Tennis Club; Hastings-on-Hudson, New York, United States; Grass; Singles - Doubles	(United States) Joseph Sill Clark Sr. 6-3 7-5 0-6 6-3	(United States) Richard Field Conover	(United States) Henry Warner Slocum	(United States) A.T. Greenough (United States) F.A. Hopkins
21 - 26 June	Clifton Lawn Tennis Tournament; Clifton, Bristol, Great Britain; Outdoor; Grass; Singles - Doubles	(United Kingdom) George Butterworth; 6-3, 4-6, 6-2	(United Kingdom) Charles Walder Grinstead	(United Kingdom) James Baldwin (United Kingdom) Charles Lacy Sweet	(United Kingdom) Montagu Hankey (United Kingdom) Lionel Wilberforce
23 - 26 June	Hayesland LTC Tournament; Hayesland LTC; Bath, Great Britain; Grass; Singles - Doubles	(United Kingdom of Great Britain and Ireland) James Baldwin; 6-0 6-1 8-6	(United Kingdom of Great Britain and Ireland) L.K. Smith	(United Kingdom) Ralph Bagnall-Wild	(United Kingdom) H. Clark (England) P.D. Tucker (United Kingdom) B. Winthrop
25 -27 June.	Edinburgh University LTC Open; Edinburgh University Lawn Tennis Club; Edinburgh, Scotland; Grass; Singles - Doubles	(England) Walter William Chamberlain; 6-1, 6-1, 10-8	(Scotland) Charles Robert Andrew Howden	(Scotland) Charles Robert Andrew Howden (Scotland) George Nelson Stenhouse	(England) Arthur Walton Fuller (Scotland) Charles Allen Casterton Smelt (Scotland) Archibald Thomson
25 -27 June.	Edinburgh University LTC Open; Edinburgh University Lawn Tennis Club; Edinburgh, Scotland; Grass; Singles - Doubles	Challenger (Scotland) John Galbraith Horn		(Scotland) Charles Robert Andrew Howden (Scotland) George Nelson Stenhouse	(England) Arthur Walton Fuller (Scotland) Charles Allen Casterton Smelt (Scotland) Archibald Thomson
26 - 28 June	Northumberland Cricket Club Open; Northumberland County Cricket Club; Newcastle-upon-Tyne; Great Britain; Grass	(United Kingdom) E. M. Sinclair; 2-6, 6-4, 4-6, 6-4, 6-2	(United Kingdom) Minden Fenwick	(United Kingdom of Great Britain and Ireland) A. Dunn Jr.	(United Kingdom of Great Britain and Ireland) Thomas Oswald Swarbreck (United Kingdom of Great Britain and Ireland) T.R. Redmayne
23 - 29 June.	Orange Spring Tournament; Orange Lawn tennis Club; Montrose, New Jersey, United States; Grass; Singles - Doubles	(United States) Richard Field Conover; 6-0 5-7 7-5 7-9 6-4	(United States) Wallace P. Knapp	(United States) William V.S. Thorne	(United States) Morgan Gibbes Post (United States) P. Willis
23 - 29 June	Leamington Open Tournament; Leamington Spa, Warwickshire, England; Outdoor; Grass; Singles - Doubles	(United Kingdom) Teddy Williams; 6-3 6-2 6-2	(United Kingdom of Great Britain and Ireland) Frank Noon	(England) John Redfern Deykin (United Kingdom of Great Britain and Ireland) C.E. Salmon	(Ireland) Alfred Henry Betham (England) Robert Rawnsley Bowles (England) Philip Grove
23 - 29 June	Warwickshire Championships; Leamington Spa, Warwickshire, England; Outdoor; Grass; Singles - Doubles	(United Kingdom of Great Britain and Ireland) Robert Rawnsley Bowles; 6-4, 6-1, 6-2	(United Kingdom of Great Britain and Ireland) C.A. Woods	(England) Philip Grove	(United States) Hamilton A. Emmons (United Kingdom of Great Britain and Ireland) A.H. Griffiths (United Kingdom of Great Britain and Ireland) John Charles Kay

=== July ===
Date	Tournament	Winner	Finalist	Semi finalist	Quarter finalist
July	Natal Championships; Pietermaritzburg, South Africa; Outdoor; Grass; Singles - Doubles	(South Africa) Mr Crawfurd; 6-4 6-4 8-6	(United Kingdom of Great Britain and Ireland) George Stanley		
9 – 12 July.	North Berkshire ALTC Tournament; Abingdon, North Berkshire, England; Outdoor; Grass; Singles - Doubles	(United Kingdom of Great Britain and Ireland) Mr. Awdry; 6-4, 2-6, 6-5	(United Kingdom of Great Britain and Ireland) W.A. Platt	(United Kingdom of Great Britain and Ireland) A.B. Fielden (United Kingdom of Great Britain and Ireland) A.H. Jacob	(United Kingdom of Great Britain and Ireland) F. Comins (United Kingdom of Great Britain and Ireland) J.H. Deazeley (United Kingdom of Great Britain and Ireland) M. Eales (United Kingdom of Great Britain and Ireland) T.E. Graham
5 - 15 July	Wimbledon Championships; London, Great Britain; Grass; Singles - Doubles	(United Kingdom of Great Britain and Ireland) William Renshaw; 6–0, 6–4, 9–7	(United Kingdom of Great Britain and Ireland) Charles Walder Grinstead	(United Kingdom of Great Britain and Ireland) Ernest Renshaw	(Ireland) Ernest Browne (England) Wilfred Milne (United Kingdom of Great Britain and Ireland) William Taylor (United Kingdom of Great Britain and Ireland) RC Thompson
5 - 15 July	Wimbledon Championships; London, Great Britain; Grass; Singles - Doubles	Challenger (Scotland) Herbert Fortescue Lawford		(United Kingdom of Great Britain and Ireland) Ernest Renshaw	(Ireland) Ernest Browne (England) Wilfred Milne (United Kingdom of Great Britain and Ireland) William Taylor (United Kingdom of Great Britain and Ireland) RC Thompson
19 July	Scottish Championships; Edinburgh Academical Club; Edinburgh, Scotland; Grass; Singles - Doubles	(United Kingdom of Great Britain and Ireland) Reginald Arthur Gamble; 6-3 10-8 2-6 6-3	(Scotland) Herbert Bowes-Lyon	(United Kingdom of Great Britain and Ireland) Joseph Bruce Ismay	(Scotland) Patrick Bowes-Lyon (Scotland) George Nelson Stenhouse (Scotland) Archibald Thomson
19 July	Scottish Championships; Edinburgh Academical Club; Edinburgh, Scotland; Grass; Singles - Doubles	Challenger (Scotland) John Galbraith Horn		(United Kingdom of Great Britain and Ireland) Joseph Bruce Ismay	(Scotland) Patrick Bowes-Lyon (Scotland) George Nelson Stenhouse (Scotland) Archibald Thomson
14 -20 July.	Duffield LTC Open Tournament; Duffield LTC; Duffield, Derbyshire, England; Grass; Singles - Doubles	(England) Horace Septimus Wansbrough; 6-5 6-5 6-2	(England) Henry Homfray	(England) William Gerald Barker (England) Daniel Lee	(United Kingdom) A. Fitzmaurice (India) Hugh Vibart MacNaghten (England) Leonard Dampier
21 - 27 July.	Edgbaston Open Tournament; Edgbaston, Warwickshire, England; Outdoor; Grass; Singles - Doubles	(United Kingdom of Great Britain and Ireland) Teddy Williams; 8-6, 6-2 6-3	(United Kingdom of Great Britain and Ireland) Walter William Chamberlain	(United Kingdom of Great Britain and Ireland) John George Chamberlain (United Kingdom of Great Britain and Ireland) Joseph Bruce Ismay	(United Kingdom of Great Britain and Ireland) R.P. Carter (England) John Redfern Deykin (England) Arthur Walton Fuller (England) Frank Noon
21-27 July.	Northumberland Championships; Newcastle upon Tyne, Northumberland, England; Outdoor; Grass; Singles - Doubles	(United Kingdom of Great Britain and Ireland) Joseph Bruce Ismay; 3-6, 6-1, 6-1, 6-4	(United Kingdom of Great Britain and Ireland) Howard Pease	(England) James Blackhouse Dale	(United Kingdom of Great Britain and Ireland) J.G. Burdon (United Kingdom of Great Britain and Ireland) Mark Fenwick
27 July. (Note: The Leicester Lawn Tennis Club Tournament was founded in 1878 it staged its first tournament in 1880 called the Leicester Lawn Tennis Tournament. In 1883 it became an open tournament the Leicester Open Tennis Tournament for both men and women until 1938. The club also shared the staging of the Leicestershire County Championships with other venues.)	Leicester Open Lawn Tennis Tournament; Leicester, Great Britain; Grass; Singles - Doubles	(United Kingdom of Great Britain and Ireland) Hugh V. McNaughten; 3-6 6-0 6-1 ret.	(United Kingdom of Great Britain and Ireland) W. J. Gray	(England) John Redfern Deykin (United Kingdom of Great Britain and Ireland) Joseph Bruce Ismay	(United Kingdom of Great Britain and Ireland) L.G. Campbell (England) Claude Erskine Farrer (United Kingdom of Great Britain and Ireland) H.C. Goodhart (England) Frank Noon
21 - 27 July. (Note: The Midland Counties Championships were staged from 1884 to 1970 on grass courts, it was an open even for men and women. The Edgbaston Lawn Tennis Club held 2 events including the Edgbaston Tennis Tournament (1881-1908, 1970) usually staged earlier both are distinct events.)	Midland Counties Championships; Edgabaston, Great Britain; Grass; Singles - Doubles	(United Kingdom of Great Britain and Ireland) Walter William Chamberlain; 6-3 2-6 10-8 6-1	(United Kingdom of Great Britain and Ireland) John Redfern Deykin	(United Kingdom of Great Britain and Ireland) Arthur Walton Fuller (England) John George Thursfield	(United Kingdom of Great Britain and Ireland) E.T. Hopkins (England) John Charles Kay (England) Frank Noon (England) Henry Blane Porter
21 - 27 July	Redhill Open Lawn Tennis Tournament; Redhill, Surrey, Great Britain; Singles - Doubles	(United Kingdom of Great Britain and Ireland) Claude Erskine Farrer; 6-2 6-4	(United Kingdom of Great Britain and Ireland) William J. Down.	(United Kingdom of Great Britain and Ireland) Charles Edward De Fonblanque (United Kingdom of Great Britain and Ireland) Arthur John Stanley	(United Kingdom of Great Britain and Ireland) W.R. Dagnall (United Kingdom of Great Britain and Ireland) Leopold Maxse (United Kingdom of Great Britain and Ireland) Harold S. Stone (United Kingdom of Great Britain and Ireland) C.G. Woolley
21 - 27 July.	South of Ireland Championships; Limerick, Ireland; Grass; Singles - Doubles	(United Kingdom of Great Britain and Ireland) Eyre Chatterton; 6-3 10-8 2-6 6-3	(Ireland) Thomas Harrison Griffiths	(England) Percy Wildman Lushington (Ireland) Francis Woodcock Perry	(Ireland) George Bloomfield Garvey (Ireland) Grattan Wildman Lushington (Ireland) Francis Metcalfe (Ireland) Robert Shaw Templer
21 - 27 July.	South of Ireland Championships; Limerick, Ireland; Grass; Singles - Doubles	Challenger (Ireland) Tom Campion		(England) Percy Wildman Lushington (Ireland) Francis Woodcock Perry	(Ireland) George Bloomfield Garvey (Ireland) Grattan Wildman Lushington (Ireland) Francis Metcalfe (Ireland) Robert Shaw Templer
28–31 Jul.	Langley Marish Tournament; Eaton Recreation Ground; Langley Marish, Berkshire, England; Grass	(England) Felix Henry Prince Palmer; 6-1. 6-0	(England) Thomas Arthur Nash	(England) Thomas Gustav Schwabe Garnett (United Kingdom) H.P. Ward	(United Kingdom) M.J. Michael (England) Wiliam Harry Nash (United Kingdom) R.J. Price (United Kingdom) Maurice John Swabey

=== August ===
Date	Tournament	Winner	Finalist	Semi finalist	Quarter finalist
August	Seabright Invitational Tournament; Sea Bright, New Jersey, United States; Grass; Singles - Doubles	(United States) Joseph Sill Clark; 3-2 Sets	(United States) Richard Field Conover		
1 - 2 August.	Worcestershire County Cricket Club Open; Boughton Cricket Ground; Worcester, Worcestershire, England. Outdoor; Grass; Singles	(United Kingdom of Great Britain and Ireland) Walter William Chamberlain; 6-2 6-4	(United Kingdom of Great Britain and Ireland) Frederick William Knox	(United Kingdom of Great Britain and Ireland) John Redfern Deykin	(United Kingdom of Great Britain and Ireland) Reginald Arthur Gamble (United Kingdom of Great Britain and Ireland) Jonas Henry William Gardner (United Kingdom of Great Britain and Ireland) Frank Noon
28 Jul-2 Aug.	King's County and Ormonde Tournament; Parsonstown, King's County, Ireland; Outdoor; Grass; Singles - Doubles	(Ireland) Ernest Browne w.o.	(Ireland) Alexander Francis Grant	(Ireland) Toler Roberts Garvey	(Ireland) Nicholas Trafalgar Biddulph
28 Jul-2 Aug.	King's County and Ormonde Tournament; Parsonstown, King's County, Ireland; Outdoor; Grass; Singles - Doubles	Challenger (Ireland) Eyre Chatterton		(Ireland) Toler Roberts Garvey	(Ireland) Nicholas Trafalgar Biddulph
29 Jul-2 Aug.	County Kildare Championship; Naas, County Kildare, Ireland; Outdoor; Grass; Singles - Doubles	(Ireland) Peter Aungier; 6-3, 3-6, 6-4, 2-6, 6-4	(Ireland) John Peter Stephen Gradwell	(Ireland) Captain Kenyon-Slaney	(Ireland) Peter Latouche (United Kingdom of Great Britain and Ireland) J. Murray (United Kingdom of Great Britain and Ireland) C.A. Williamson
29 Jul-2 Aug.	County Kildare Championship; Naas, County Kildare, Ireland; Outdoor; Grass; Singles - Doubles	Challenger (Ireland) Thomas Harrison		(Ireland) Captain Kenyon-Slaney	(Ireland) Peter Latouche (United Kingdom of Great Britain and Ireland) J. Murray (United Kingdom of Great Britain and Ireland) C.A. Williamson
28 Jul-3 Aug	Essex Championships; Brentwood, Great Britain; Grass; Singles - Doubles	(United Kingdom of Great Britain and Ireland) Charles W. Grinstead; 6-0 6-4	(United Kingdom of Great Britain and Ireland) E. N. Cubitt	(United Kingdom of Great Britain and Ireland) P. Colley (England) Edmund Arthur Hollingbury	(United Kingdom of Great Britain and Ireland) E. Bragy (England) Edward Henry Christy (United Kingdom of Great Britain and Ireland) Laurence Joseph Petre (United Kingdom of Great Britain and Ireland) C. Wells
28 Jul-3 Aug	Victoria Park Lawn Tennis Tournament; Exeter, Great Britain; Hard; Singles - Doubles	(United Kingdom of Great Britain and Ireland) Herbert W-Fox; 1-6 6-2 6-1	(United Kingdom of Great Britain and Ireland) John C. Gray		
28 Jul-3 Aug.	Maidenhead Lawn Tennis Tournament; Maidenhead, Berkshire, England; Outdoor; Grass; Singles - Doubles	(United Kingdom of Great Britain and Ireland) A. L. Davies; 6-1, 4-6, 12-10, 6-3	(United Kingdom of Great Britain and Ireland) Robert Rawnsley Bowles	(United Kingdom of Great Britain and Ireland) H.C. Woolley	(United Kingdom of Great Britain and Ireland) E. Brown (United Kingdom of Great Britain and Ireland) C.E. Salmon (United Kingdom of Great Britain and Ireland) W.G. Smith
28 Jul-3 Aug	Middlesex Championships; Chiswick, Great Britain; Grass; Singles - Doubles	(United Kingdom of Great Britain and Ireland) Charles Walder Grinstead rain stooped play	(United Kingdom of Great Britain and Ireland) Donald Stewart	(United Kingdom of Great Britain and Ireland) Herbert Chipp	(United Kingdom of Great Britain and Ireland) Marmaduke Strickland Constable (United Kingdom of Great Britain and Ireland) Ernest Wool Lewis
28 Jul-3 Aug.	Northern Championships; Liverpool Cricket Club; Liverpool, Lancashire, England; Outdoor; Grass; Singles - Doubles	(United Kingdom of Great Britain and Ireland) Donald Stewart; 5-7, 6-4, 6-4, 6-0	(Ireland) Ernest Browne; 1-6, 6-3, 1-6, 6-3, 8-6	(United States) James Dwight	(England) Jacob Gaitskell Brown (United States) Richard Dudley Sears (United Kingdom of Great Britain and Ireland) F. Rathbone
28 Jul-3 Aug.	Northern Championships; Liverpool Cricket Club; Liverpool, Lancashire, England; Outdoor; Grass; Singles - Doubles	Challenger (United Kingdom of Great Britain and Ireland) Herbert Wilberforce		(United States) James Dwight	(England) Jacob Gaitskell Brown (United States) Richard Dudley Sears (United Kingdom of Great Britain and Ireland) F. Rathbone
28 Jul-3 Aug.	Wentworth Open Tournament; Hotel Wentworth; New Castle, New Hampshire, United States; Grass; Singles - Doubles	(United States) Howard Augustus Taylor; 8-6 7-5 6-8 6-3	(United States) Wallace Percy Knapp	(United States) William V.S. Thorne (United States) E.K. Butler	
1-6 August	Abbot's Court Hoo Tournament; Hoo St Werburgh, Rochester, Kent, England; Outdoor; Grass; Singles	(United Kingdom) Ernest Wool Lewis; 6-4, 6–4, 6-4	(United Kingdom) Roy Allen		
3 -8 Aug.	Burbage Tennis Tournament; Burbage, Wiltshire, England; Outdoor; Grass; Singles - Doubles	(United Kingdom of Great Britain and Ireland) Captain Taylor; 6-3 6-2	(England) Charles Hobson Marriott	(England) Theodore Coventry (United Kingdom of Great Britain and Ireland) H. Shipton	
4 -10 Aug. (Note: The Saxmundham Lawn Tennis Club Tournament was established in 1883 and ran until 1893. In 1894 the event was renamed the Suffolk Championships which ran till 1968. The Framlingham Tennis Tournament was also staged in 1883 Hurts Hall Park. In 1900 that event moved to the first two weeks of August and remains so. Both are distinct events)	Saxmundham Lawn Tennis Club Tournament; Saxmundham, Great Britain; Grass; Singles - Doubles	(United Kingdom of Great Britain and Ireland) Francis William Monement; 6-4 1-6 6-1	(United Kingdom of Great Britain and Ireland) Charles. E. Weddon	(United States) Hamilton A. Emmons	(England) Charles Sidney Cullingham (England) Edward Morgan Hansell
4 -10 Aug.	Waterford Annual Lawn Tennis Tournament; Rocklands, Waterford, Ireland; Outdoor; Grass; Singles - Doubles	(Ireland) Frederick W. Knox; 6-4 7-5 6-4	(Ireland) John H. Browne; 6-0, 6-3	(Ireland) Hercules Robert Langrishe	(United Kingdom of Great Britain and Ireland) F.E. Bird (United Kingdom of Great Britain and Ireland) J. Butterworth (Ireland) William James Gallwey
4 -10 Aug.	Waterford Annual Lawn Tennis Tournament; Rocklands, Waterford, Ireland; Outdoor; Grass; Singles - Doubles	Challenger (United Kingdom of Great Britain and Ireland) George Butterworth		(Ireland) Hercules Robert Langrishe	(United Kingdom of Great Britain and Ireland) F.E. Bird (United Kingdom of Great Britain and Ireland) J. Butterworth (Ireland) William James Gallwey
10 – 13 August. (Note: The Hull Westbourne Avenue ran from 1884 to 1906.)	Hull Westbourne Avenue Open Tournament; Teignmouth Tennis Club; Kingston-Upon-Hull, England; Grass; Singles – Doubles	(United Kingdom) W.S. Wright w.o.	(United Kingdom) William Francis Wells-Cole	(United Kingdom) L. Harrison (United Kingdom) H.N. Wade	(United Kingdom) E.W. Brooke (England) Thomas Barton Holmes (United Kingdom) C.V. Wilkes
11 - 17 Aug.	Darlington Association Tournament; Darlington Cricket Ground; Darlington, County Durham, England; Outdoor; Grass; Singles - Doubles	(Scotland) Patrick Bowes-Lyon; 7-9 6-2 6-1 ret.	(Scotland) John Galbraith Horn; 4-6, 6-1, 6-3, 6-1	(United Kingdom) Minden Fenwick (England) Norman Leslie Hallward	(United Kingdom) A.L. Davidson (United Kingdom) Percival Clennell Fenwick (United Kingdom) Hugh A. Taylor (United Kingdom) E.M. Turner
11 - 17 Aug.	Darlington Association Tournament; Darlington Cricket Ground; Darlington, County Durham, England; Outdoor; Grass; Singles - Doubles	Challenger (United Kingdom) Herbert Wilberforce		(United Kingdom) Minden Fenwick (England) Norman Leslie Hallward	(United Kingdom) A.L. Davidson (United Kingdom) Percival Clennell Fenwick (United Kingdom) Hugh A. Taylor (United Kingdom) E.M. Turner
11 - 17 Aug	Derbyshire Championships; Buxton, Great Britain; Grass; Singles - Doubles	(United Kingdom of Great Britain and Ireland) Charles Walder Grinstead; 5-7 6-2 6-2 5-7 6-4	(Ireland) Ernest Browne	(England) John Redfern Deykin (United Kingdom) Walter William Chamberlain	(United Kingdom) A.A. Fuller (England) Philip Grove (England) Hugh Workman-MacNaghten (United Kingdom) William C. Taylor
11 - 17 Aug	East Grinstead Lawn Tennis Club Tournament; East Grinstead, Great Britain; Grass; Singles - Doubles	(United Kingdom of Great Britain and Ireland) Charles Lacy Sweet; 6-2 6-3 6-3	(United Kingdom of Great Britain and Ireland) L. G. Campbell	(England) Orlando Robert Coote	(England) William John Down (United Kingdom of Great Britain and Ireland) A. Massy (England) Leo Maxse
11 - 17 Aug. (Note: The North of England Championships was established in 1884 as the North Yorkshire Tournament and was staged until at least 1974 according to sources.)	North Yorkshire Tournament; Scarborough, Great Britain; Grass; Singles - Doubles	(Ireland) Ernest Browne; 6-1 ret.	(United Kingdom of Great Britain and Ireland) Marmaduke Strickland Constable	(England) Harold Stapylton Greenwell (United Kingdom of Great Britain and Ireland) William C. Taylor	(England) Ernest Edwin Meek (United Kingdom of Great Britain and Ireland) George E. Newby (England) Arthur Godfrey Pease
11 - 17 Aug.	Teignmouth and Shaldon Tournament; Teignmouth, England; Outdoor; Asphalt; Singles - Doubles	(United Kingdom of Great Britain and Ireland) Captain Wood; 6-1 6-1	(United Kingdom of Great Britain and Ireland) William P. Wethered	(United Kingdom of Great Britain and Ireland) J.C. Rogers (England) Erskine Gerald Watson	(United Kingdom of Great Britain and Ireland) P.W. Bush (England) Edward Charles Pine-Coffin (England) Arthur Percy (Percy) Jones (England) Henry Blane Porter
15-20 Aug.	Staffordshire County Cricket Club Lawn Tennis Tournament. Lichfield, Great Britain; Grass; Singles	(United Kingdom) F.A. Hedley; 6-4, 2-6, 6-5	(United Kingdom) W.J. Bagnall	(United Kingdom) William Edward Baddeley	(United Kingdom) J.W. Baddeley (United Kingdom) W.E. Elliott (United Kingdom) W.L. Ward
18 - 20 Aug	Windermere Open; Windermere, Great Britain; Grass; Singles - Doubles	(United Kingdom of Great Britain and Ireland) H.P. Mason; 6-4 6-2	(United Kingdom of Great Britain and Ireland) Richard Montague Ainslie	(United Kingdom of Great Britain and Ireland) E. Crawley (United Kingdom of Great Britain and Ireland) R. Hill	(United Kingdom of Great Britain and Ireland) Ernest Henry Ainslie (United Kingdom of Great Britain and Ireland) Anthony Alfred Bowlby (United Kingdom of Great Britain and Ireland) C. Dunn (United Kingdom of Great Britain and Ireland) W. Hunter
18 - 20 Aug	Bridlington Quay Tournament; Bridlington, Great Britain; Grass; Singles - Doubles	(United Kingdom of Great Britain and Ireland) Charles Walder Grinstead; 6-2 6-2 6-3	(United Kingdom of Great Britain and Ireland) H. Anderson	(United Kingdom of Great Britain and Ireland) H.P. Marriott	
20 August.	Berrylands Club Tournament; Berrylands LTC; Surbiton, Surrey, England; Outdoor; Grass; Singles	(United Kingdom of Great Britain and Ireland) G.A. Bolton; 6-2, 6-1	(United Kingdom of Great Britain and Ireland) Harry Stanley Scrivener	(United Kingdom of Great Britain and Ireland) Herbert Henley Playford	(United Kingdom of Great Britain and Ireland) E. Boydell (United Kingdom of Great Britain and Ireland) Percy Kemp Heard (United Kingdom of Great Britain and Ireland) H. Kerby
19 - 21 Aug.	Saxmundham Lawn Tennis Tournament; Saxmundham Lawn Tennis Club; Hurts Hill Park, Saxmundham, England; Grass; Saxmundham Lawn Tennis Tournament – Doubles	(United Kingdom) Francis William Monement; 6-4 1-6 6-1	(England) Maurice Welldon	(United States) Hamilton A. Emmons	(United Kingdom) Charles Sidney Cullingham (United Kingdom) Edward Morgan Hansell
18 - 23 Aug.	Whitby Open Lawn Tennis Tournament; West Cliff Tennis Grounds; Whitby, North Yorkshire, England; Outdoor; Grass; Singles - Doubles	(England) Arthur Godfrey Pease; 6-5 4-6 3-6 6-2 6-5	George E. Newby	(England) John Charles Kay (United Kingdom of Great Britain and Ireland) W.B. Tarpey	(United Kingdom of Great Britain and Ireland) C.L. Clay (United Kingdom of Great Britain and Ireland) H.H. Clay (Ireland) G.F. Richardson (United Kingdom of Great Britain and Ireland) C.A. Woodhouse
21–23 August.	North Wales Challenge Cup; Vale of Clwyd LTC; Denbigh, Vale of Clwyd, Wales; Outdoor; Grass; Singles	(Wales) G. Egerton w.o.	(Wales) R. Lloyd Williams	(Scotland) A. MacBean (Wales) J.P. Lewis	(Wales) Thomas Alured Wynne Edwards (United Kingdom of Great Britain and Ireland) Major Mesham (United Kingdom) P. Ormrod (Wales) H. Lloyd Williams
21–23 August.	North Wales Challenge Cup; Vale of Clwyd LTC; Denbigh, Vale of Clwyd, Wales; Outdoor; Grass; Singles	Challenger (England) Arthur Bennett Mesham		(Scotland) A. MacBean (Wales) J.P. Lewis	(Wales) Thomas Alured Wynne Edwards (United Kingdom of Great Britain and Ireland) Major Mesham (United Kingdom) P. Ormrod (Wales) H. Lloyd Williams
18 - 24 Aug.	Exmouth Lawn Tennis Club Tournament; Exmouth, Devon, England; Outdoor; Grass; Singles - Doubles	(United Kingdom of Great Britain and Ireland) Charles Walder Grinstead; 6-2 6-2 6-3	(United Kingdom of Great Britain and Ireland) Gerald Erskine Watson	(England) Walter William Chamberlain (England) Harry Grove	(England) Henry Blane Porter (United Kingdom of Great Britain and Ireland) H. Kerby (England) Charles Lacy Sweet (United Kingdom of Great Britain and Ireland) G.H. Taylor
18 - 24 Aug	South of Scotland Championships; Moffat, Great Britain; Grass; Singles - Doubles	(United Kingdom of Great Britain and Ireland) Percival Clennell Fenwick; 6-3 6-2 6-3	(Scotland) Archibald Thomson	(Scotland) Charles Robert Andrew Howden	(Scotland) William Ferguson (Scotland) Alfred Gordon Rae
22-24 August.	Holt Lawn Tennis Club Tournament; Holt LTC; Holt, Norfolk, England; Outdoor; Grass; Singles - Doubles	(United Kingdom) William Bolding Monement; 6-1, 6-0	(England) Edward Berners Upcher	(United Kingdom) Francis William Monement	(England) Charles Sidney
23–25 August.	South Wales and Monmouthshire Championships; Tenby LTC; Tenby, Carmarthenshire, Wales; Outdoor; Grass; Singles	(United Kingdom) Herbert Wilberforce; 6-4, 3–6, 6-2, 4-6, 6-1	(Wales) William Sidney Nelson Heard	(Wales) Gethin Meredith (England) William Gascoyne Dalziel	(Wales) George Bevan Bowen (Wales) Grismond Saunders Davies
25 - ? Aug	Mid Devon Lawn Tennis Tournament; Tiverton, Great Britain; Grass; Singles - Doubles	(United Kingdom of Great Britain and Ireland) Norman L. Hallward; 6-0 6-0 6-1	(United Kingdom of Great Britain and Ireland) A.N. Dumbleton	(United Kingdom of Great Britain and Ireland) M.D. Buckingham (United Kingdom of Great Britain and Ireland) H.L. Luxton	(United Kingdom of Great Britain and Ireland) R.H.S. Barnes (England) Arthur Belfield (United Kingdom of Great Britain and Ireland) Charles Henry Luxton (United Kingdom of Great Britain and Ireland) P. Whately
26 - 28 Aug	Galashiels Championship; Galashiels, Great Britain; Grass; Singles - Doubles	(Scotland) Alfred Aitken Thomson; 6–5, 6–1, 6–2	(England) S.C. Knott	(Scotland) Forrester John Thomson	(Scotland) Alex Buchanan (England) Thomas Byrne Sellar (Scotland) L. Sanderson
25 - 31 Aug	Burton-on-Trent Open; Burton-on-Trent, Great Britain; Grass; Singles - Doubles	(United Kingdom of Great Britain and Ireland) W. W. Chamberlain; 6-4 6-3 6-0	(United Kingdom of Great Britain and Ireland) E. W. Brook	(United Kingdom of Great Britain and Ireland) W.E. Baddeley (England) Lewin Venn Alexander	(England) Frank Noon (United Kingdom of Great Britain and Ireland) G.E. Lowe (United Kingdom of Great Britain and Ireland) W.G. Lowe (United Kingdom of Great Britain and Ireland) H.E. Sugden
25 - 31 Aug	U.S. National Championships; Newport, United States; Grass; Singles - Doubles	(United States) Richard Sears; 6-0 1-6 6-0 6-2	(United States) William VS Thorne	(United States) Clarence Clark (United States) Percy Knapp	(United States) Robert Livingston Beeckman (United States) Alexander Van Rensselaer (United States) George Richards (United States) AC Salt
25 - 31 Aug	U.S. National Championships; Newport, United States; Grass; Singles - Doubles	Challenger (United States) Howard Taylor		(United States) Clarence Clark (United States) Percy Knapp	(United States) Robert Livingston Beeckman (United States) Alexander Van Rensselaer (United States) George Richards (United States) AC Salt
25 - 31 Aug	U.S. National Championships; Newport, United States; Grass; Singles - Doubles	(United States) Richard Sears; James Dwight; 6-4, 6-1, 8-10, 6-4	(United States) Alexander Van Rensselaer (United States) Arthur Newbold	(United States) Clarence Clark (United States) Percy Knapp	(United States) Robert Livingston Beeckman (United States) Alexander Van Rensselaer (United States) George Richards (United States) AC Salt
27–29 Aug.	Devon and Cornwall Archery Society Lawn Tennis Tournament; Manadon, Plymouth, England; Grass; Singles - Doubles	(United Kingdom of Great Britain and Ireland) Edward Linwood Strong; 6-3 6-3	(United Kingdom of Great Britain and Ireland) Saint John Halford Coventry	(United Kingdom of Great Britain and Ireland) George William Webber	(United Kingdom of Great Britain and Ireland) F. Stoney (United Kingdom of Great Britain and Ireland) W. Ware

=== September ===
Date	Tournament	Winner	Finalist	Semi finalist	Quarter finalist
1 - 4 Sep.	County Carlow Lawn Tennis Tournament; Carlow, County Carlow, Ireland; Grass; Singles - Doubles	(Ireland) R. Grove Annesley; 6-5 6-5 6-2	(Ireland) J.E. Jameson	(England) Arthur S. E. Annesley (Ireland) R.L. Rike	(Ireland) A. Fitzmaurice (Ireland) J.H. Thomas (Ireland) C.O. Vigers
27 Aug - 5 Sep.	Gore Court Championships; Sittingbourne, Gore Court Archery and LTC; Gore Court, Sittingbourne, Great Britain; Outdoor; Grass; Singles	(United Kingdom) C.C.J. Perry; 6-3 7-6 6-4	(United Kingdom) C. Igglesden	(United Kingdom) J.W. Collard	(United Kingdom) H. Cooper (United Kingdom) A.W. Oliver (United Kingdom) F.J. Troughton
1 - 7 Sep	Canadian Championships; Toronto LTC; Toronto, Canada; Grass; Singles - Doubles	(Canada) Charles Smith Hyman; 8-6 6-8 4-6 6-4 6-2	(Canada) Alexander C. Galt	(Canada) Alexander Monro Grier (Ireland) FitzJames Hynes	(Canada) F. Lewis Bird (Canada) Henry R. Elmsley (Canada) Henry Gordon Mackenzie (Canada) V. Wolsely
1 - 7 Sep	Bournemouth Lawn Tennis Club Tournament; Dean Park; Bournemouth, Hampshire, England; Outdoor; Grass; Singles - Doubles	(United Kingdom of Great Britain and Ireland) Ernest Wool Lewis; 6-0 6-2 6-3	(United Kingdom of Great Britain and Ireland) Aston Cooper-Key	(United Kingdom of Great Britain and Ireland) Montague Hankey (United Kingdom of Great Britain and Ireland) Charles Gathorne Edmund Orr	(United Kingdom of Great Britain and Ireland) W. Heath (England) John Henry Lewis (United Kingdom of Great Britain and Ireland) R. Pinckney (England) H. Olliffe
1 - 7 Sep.	Orange Invitation; Mountain Station, Montrose; South Orange, New Jersey, USA; Outdoor; Grass; Singles - Doubles	(United States) Howard Augustus Taylor; 7-5 6-2 6-3	(United States) William V.S. Thorne	(United States) Jackson C. Wilmerding	(United States) James Dwight (United States) Morton Spring Paton
1 - 7 Sep	South of England Championships; Eastbourne, East Sussex, England; Outdoor; Grass; Singles - Doubles	(United Kingdom of Great Britain and Ireland) Teddy Williams; 1-6 6-2 6-2 6-2	(United Kingdom of Great Britain and Ireland) William C. Taylor	(United Kingdom of Great Britain and Ireland) Charles Walder Grinstead	(England) Orlando Robert Coote (United Kingdom of Great Britain and Ireland) P. Colley (England) Charles Lacy Sweet
2–4 Sep	West Teviotdale Open; Hawick Cricket Ground; Hawick, Teviotdale, Roxburghshire, Scotland; Grass; Singles - Doubles	(Scotland) Joseph C. Maxwell-Scott; 3-6 6-3 9-7 6-2	(United Kingdom) James Locke	(United Kingdom) L. Sanderson (United Kingdom) W.O. Stevenson	(United Kingdom) Edmund J. Constable Maxwell (Scotland) J. Moffat (United Kingdom) A. Sellar
2–4 Sep	West Teviotdale Open; Hawick Cricket Ground; Hawick, Teviotdale, Roxburghshire, Scotland; Grass; Singles - Doubles	(Scotland) Patrick Bowes-Lyon (Scotland) Herbert Bowes-Lyon; 6-1 6-2 6-2	(United Kingdom) A. Sellar (Scotland) Archibald Thomson	(United Kingdom) L. Sanderson (United Kingdom) W.O. Stevenson	(United Kingdom) Edmund J. Constable Maxwell (Scotland) J. Moffat (United Kingdom) A. Sellar
2–4 Sep	West Teviotdale Open; Hawick Cricket Ground; Hawick, Teviotdale, Roxburghshire, Scotland; Grass; Singles - Doubles	(Scotland) S.B. Murray (Scotland) Miss Murray; 6-1 6-3	(Scotland) C.E. Stewart (Scotland) Miss Stuart	(United Kingdom) L. Sanderson (United Kingdom) W.O. Stevenson	(United Kingdom) Edmund J. Constable Maxwell (Scotland) J. Moffat (United Kingdom) A. Sellar
22 - 27 Sep.	Sussex County Lawn Tennis Tournament; Hove Rink Tennis Courts; Brighton, East Sussex, England; Outdoor; Grass; Singles - Doubles	(England) Charles Lacy Sweet; 0-6 6-1 6-3 6-3	(United Kingdom of Great Britain and Ireland) Charles Hoadley Ashe Ross	(England) George Lawrence Orme (United Kingdom of Great Britain and Ireland) Edward Barrett-Smith	(United Kingdom of Great Britain and Ireland) L.G. Campbell (United Kingdom of Great Britain and Ireland) J.B. Forman (England) J. Garrett (United Kingdom of Great Britain and Ireland) William C. Taylor

=== October ===
Date	Tournament	Winner	Finalist	Semi finalist	Quarter finalist
30 Sep-6 Oct	Longwood Cricket Club Tournament; Longwood Cricket Club; Brookline, Massachusetts, United States; Grass; Singles - Doubles	(United States) James Dwight ?	(United States) Quincy Adams Shaw Jr	(United States) C.C. Wheelwright	(United States) Palmer Ellis Presbrey (United States) Howard Augustus Taylor
3 - 6 Oct	Lausanne Autumn Meeting; Montchoisi Lawn Tennis Club; Montchoisi, Lausanne, Switzerland; Asphalt; Singles - Doubles	(United Kingdom) G.S. Money; 10-12 4-6 6-3 6-3 6-2	(England) Alexander W. Miller White	(United Kingdom) Mr. Tayler (United Kingdom) H. Webb	(United Kingdom) C.J. Nowell (United Kingdom) Mr. Price (Switzerland) Mr. de Reuterskiold (Switzerland) F. Vizard
6 - 12 Oct	Intercollegiate Championships; Hartford, Connecticut, United States; Grass; Singles - Doubles	(United States) Wallace Percy Knapp; 10-12 4-6 6-3 6-3 6-2	(United States) Godfrey M. Brinley		

=== November ===
No Events

=== December ===
Date	Tournament	Winner	Finalist	Semi finalist	Quarter finalist
15 - 21 Dec.	Victorian Championships; Melbourne Cricket Ground LTC; Melbourne, Victoria, Australia; Hard; Singles - Doubles	(Australia) Harry Hanslow Brind; 25 games to 17	(Australia) Dudley Webb	(Australia) Ernest Raleigh (Australia) Walter John Carre Riddell	(Australia) Haworth William Bartram (Australia) Thomas Archibald A'Beckett (Australia) Frank Highett (Australia) W. Melville

== Sources ==
- Garcia, Gabriel (2018). "Tournament Roll of Honour - Worcesterships Championships - 1884-1970". thetennisbase.com. Madrid, Spain: Tennismem SAL.
- Gillmeister, Heiner (1998). Tennis:Cultural History. London: A&C Black. ISBN 9780718501952.
- "History - KZN Tennis". KZN Tennis. Kwazulu Natal Tennis Association. 2018.
- Mazak, Karoly (2017). The Concise History of Tennis. Independently published. ISBN 9781549746475.
- Nauright, John; Parrish, Charles (2012). Sports Around the World: History, Culture, and Practice. Santa Barbara, Calif.: ABC-CLIO. ISBN 9781598843002.
- Nieuwland, Alex (2009–2017). "Tournaments 1884". www.tennisarchives.com. Harlingen, Netherlands: Idzznew BV.
