= 1883 women's tennis season =

Irish sporting event

1883 Women's tennis season
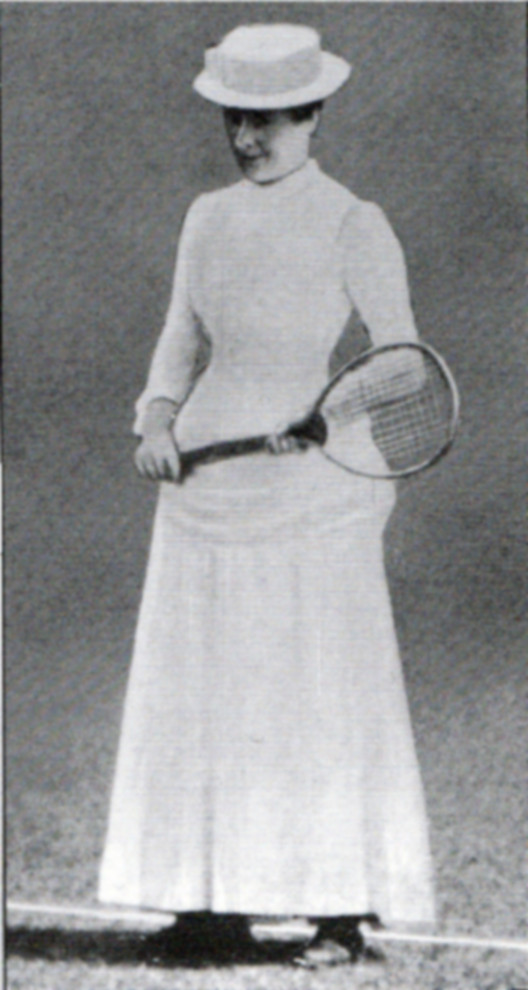
- Maud Watson is title leader this year (3 singles, 3 doubles, 2 mix doubles)

Details
- Duration: 22 May – 5 October
- Edition: 8th
- Tournaments: 25
- Categories: Important (2); National (0); Provincial/Regional/State (4); County (4); Regular (15)

Achievements (singles)
- Most titles: (England) Maud Watson (3)
- Most finals: (England) Maud Watson (3)

The 1883 Women's tennis season was a tennis circuit composed of 25 national, regional, county, and regular tournaments. The season began in May in Dublin, Ireland, and ended in October in Staten Island, United States.

== Season summary ==
Prior to the creation of the International Lawn Tennis Federation and the establishment of its world championship events in 1913 the Wimbledon Championships, the U.S. National Championships, the Irish Lawn Tennis Championships and the Northern Championships were considered by players and historians as the four most important tennis tournaments to win.

1883 sees a decrease in the number women's singles events being held as the tennis circuit continues to form. In May 1883 at the first major event of the year the Irish Championships in Dublin, Ireland. In the women's Ireland's May Langrishe wins the singles title defeating her sister Beatrice Langrishe, she also picks up the mixed doubles title with Ernest Browne. In terms of draw size the West of England Championships was the largest tournament of the year with a draw of 46 across three events.

In June 1883 at the second major tournament of the year the Northern Championships in Manchester featured a full schedule of events the singles title going to Edith Coleridge, she also picks up the doubles title with Rose Collier, whilst the mixed event is won by the pairing of Clara Fletcher and Ernest Browne (himself winning both mixed titles at both major tournaments).

At the 1883 Wimbledon Championships the world's first major tennis tournament, it still remained an all men's event, no women's events were staged. At the U.S. National Championships there was still no women's championship events held. In October 1883 the first official event for women is held at the Staten Island Cricket Club organised by the Brighton Ladies Club for Outdoor Sports, the event is known as the Camp Washington Ladies Tournament a Miss Goodwin defeats Adeline Robinson in the singles final, however she wins the doubles title with a Miss Grandy. In 1913 the International Lawn Tennis Federation was created, that consisted of national member associations. The ILTF through its associated members then became responsible for supervising women's tour events.

== Season results ==
Notes 1: Challenge Round: the final round of a tournament, in which the winner of a single-elimination phase faces the previous year's champion, who plays only that one match. The challenge round was used in the early history of tennis (from 1877 through 1921), in some tournaments not all.

* Indicates challenge round final

Key

Important.
National
Provincial/State/Regional
County
Local

Results included:

=== January to April ===
No events

=== May ===
Mix doubles (**)

Ended	Tournament	Winner	Finalist	Semifinalist	Quarterfinalist
27 May.	Irish Championships; Fitzwilliam LTC; Dublin, Ireland; Outdoor; Grass; Singles - Doubles	(Ireland) May Langrishe; 6-0, 6-1	(Ireland) Beatrice Langrishe	(Ireland) Connie Butler (Ireland) E. Esmonde	(Ireland) Miss Bayley (Ireland) Mrs Clarke (Ireland) Lena Rice (Ireland) Miss Shaw
27 May.	Irish Championships; Fitzwilliam LTC; Dublin, Ireland; Outdoor; Grass; Singles - Doubles	(Ireland) May Langrishe** (Ireland) Ernest Browne; 6-3, 6-2, 6-0	(Ireland) Lena Rice (Ireland) Peter Aungier	(Ireland) Connie Butler (Ireland) E. Esmonde	(Ireland) Miss Bayley (Ireland) Mrs Clarke (Ireland) Lena Rice (Ireland) Miss Shaw

=== June ===
Ended	Tournament	Winner	Finalist	Semi Finalist	Quarter Finalist
2 June.	West of England Championships; Lansdowne Cricket Club; Bath, England; Outdoor; Grass; Singles - Doubles	(England) Maud Watson; 6-1, 6-2	(Ireland) N. Pope	(England) Clara Hill	(United Kingdom) Georgina Kirkby (England) Florence Mardall (United Kingdom) N. Pope
2 June.	West of England Championships; Lansdowne Cricket Club; Bath, England; Outdoor; Grass; Singles - Doubles	(England) Lilian Watson* (England) Maud Watson; 6-3, 5-6, 6-3	(England) Edith Davies (United Kingdom) Grace Gibbs	(England) Clara Hill	(United Kingdom) Georgina Kirkby (England) Florence Mardall (United Kingdom) N. Pope
9 June.	East Gloucestershire Championships; Montpelier Gardens; Cheltenham, England; Outdoor; Grass; Singles	(England) Maud Watson; 6-3, 6-0	(England) F Davies	(England) Edith Davies	(England) Miss Cornford (England) Florence Mardall
9 June.	East Gloucestershire Championships; Montpelier Gardens; Cheltenham, England; Outdoor; Grass; Singles	(England) Lilian Watson * (England) Maud Watson; 6-1, 6-1	(England) Kate Cornford (England) F Davies	(England) Edith Davies	(England) Miss Cornford (England) Florence Mardall
21 June.	Leicester Open; Leicester, England; Outdoor; Grass; Singles - Doubles	(England) Agnes Watts; 2-6, 6-1, 6-1, 6-2	(England) Miss Noon		
22 June.	County Kilkenny Tournament; Archersfield, Ireland; Outdoor; Grass; Singles - Doubles	(Ireland) May Langrishe; 6-1, 6-2, 6-0	(Ireland) Mary Lysaght		
30 June.	Northern Championships; Manchester, England; Outdoor; Grass; Singles - Doubles	(England) Edith Coleridge; 6-3, 9-7	(England) Miss Eckersley	(England) Miss L Cheetham (England) Emily Fletcher	(England) N. Garnett (England) A. McLaren (Scotland) B. McLaren (England) K. Mitchell
30 June.	Northern Championships; Manchester, England; Outdoor; Grass; Singles - Doubles	(England) Edith Coleridge * (England) Rose Collier; 6-3, 9-7	(England) Miss L Cheetham (England) Miss Eckersley	(England) Miss L Cheetham (England) Emily Fletcher	(England) N. Garnett (England) A. McLaren (Scotland) B. McLaren (England) K. Mitchell

=== July ===
* (denotes doubles) ** (denotes mix doubles)x

Date	Tournament	Winner	Finalist	Semifinalist	Quarterfinalist
7 Jul.	Leamington Open Tournament; Leamington Spa, England; Grass; Singles - Doubles	No Ladies Singles			
7 Jul.	Leamington Open Tournament; Leamington Spa, England; Grass; Singles - Doubles	(England) Lilian Watson * (England) Maud Watson; 6-4, 6-4, 6-4	(England) Miss Noon (England) Agnes Watts		
21 Jul.	Staffordshire C.C.C. Tournament; Staffordshire Lawn Tennis Club; Lichfield, England; Grass; Singles - Doubles	(United Kingdom) Mrs Peter Smith; 2-6, 6-4, 6-5	(United Kingdom) Rose Collier		
25 Jul.	Norwich Open; Norwich, England; Grass; Singles - Doubles	(United Kingdom) G Rant; 6-1, 6-2	(United Kingdom) J.Hartoup		

=== August ===
Ended	Tournament	Winner	Finalist	Semifinalist	Quarterfinalist
1 Aug	Framlingham Open; Framlingham, England; Grass; Singles - Doubles	(England) Miss G Want; 6-2, 6-0	(England) Miss Davey		
4 Aug	Worcestershire CCC Open; Worcester, England; Grass; Singles - Doubles	(England) Florence Mardall; 6-2, 6-4	(United Kingdom) Miss Hill		
8 Aug	West Somersetshire Tournament; Taunton, England; Grass; Singles - Doubles	(England) Georgina Woodhouse; 6-5, 6-2	(England) Mary Spurway		
9 Aug	Victoria Park Lawn Tennis Tournament; Exeter, England; Grass; Singles - Doubles	(Ireland) Lilian Cole; 6-2 6-1	(United Kingdom) Miss Cobbold		
16 Aug.	South Wales Championships; Tenby, Wales; Grass; Singolare - Doppio	(Wales) C Jones; 6-2 3-6 6-4	(England) E Fletcher		
17 Aug	East Grinstead Lawn Tennis Tournament; East Grinstead, England; Grass; Singles - Doubles	(England) Leila Lodwick; 6-2 6-1	(England) Miss Cobbold		
18 Aug.	Exmouth Tournament; Exmouth, England; Grass; Singles - Doubles	(England) Maud Watson; 6-4 6-2	(England) Lilian Cole		
23 Aug.	Teignmouth and Shaldon Open; Teignmouth, England; Asphalt; Singles - Doubles	(England) Florence Mardall; 6-3, 2-6, 6-3	(England) Lilian Watson		
25 Aug.	South of Scotland Championships; Moffat, Scotland; Grass; Singles - Doubles	(Scotland) Jane Meikle; 6-3 2-6 6-3	(Scotland) A Forest		
25 Aug.	Midland Counties Championships; Edgbaston, England; Grass; Singles - Doubles	(England) Miss Hutton; 6-5 8-6	(England) L Sanders		
29 Aug	Mid Devon Lawn Tennis Tournament; Eggesford, England; Grass; Singles - Doubles	(United Kingdom) Leila Lodwick; 6-2 6-1	(United Kingdom) Miss Cobbold		

=== September ===
Ended	Tournament	Winner	Finalist	Semifinalist	Quarterfinalist
5 Sep.	Bournemouth Lawn Tennis Club Tournament; Bournemouth, England; Grass; Singles - Doubles	(United Kingdom) Mrs Hornby; 5-6 6-3 6-1	(United Kingdom) M Richards		
8 Sep	Devonshire Park Championships; Eastbourne, England; Grass; Singles - Doubles	(United Kingdom) M Leslie; 10-8 6-4	(United Kingdom) Miss Congreve		
12 Sep	Portishead Open Lawn Tennis Tournament; Portishead, England; Grass; Singles - Doubles	(United Kingdom) Miss Bryant; 6-2 6-3	(United Kingdom) J. Carter		
14 Sep	Saxmundham LTC Tournament; Saxmundham, England; Grass; Singles - Doubles	(United Kingdom) G. Rant; 6-0 6-2	(United Kingdom) L. Davy		

=== October ===
Ended	Tournament	Winner	Finalist	Semifinalist	Quarterfinalist
5 Oct.	Camp Washington Ladies Lawn Tennis Tournament; Staten Island, United States; Grass; Singles - Doubles	(United States) Miss Goodwin; 6-2 4-6 6-5	(United States) Adeline Robinson		

=== November to December ===
No events

== Tournament winners (singles) ==
This is a list of winners by the total number of singles titles won for 1883:

- (England) Maud Watson – Bath, Cheltenham, Exmouth, (3)
- (Ireland) May Langrishe – Archersfield, Irish Championships, (2)
- (England) Edith Coleridge – Northern Championships, Leicester (2)
- (England) Florence Mardall – Teignmouth, Worcester, (2)
- (England) Leila Lodwick – East Grinstead, Eggesford (2)
- (United Kingdom) G. Rant – Norwich, Saxmundham, (2)
- (United States) Miss Goodwin – Staten Island, (1)
- (United Kingdom) Mrs Peter Smith – Lichfield, (1)
- (England) Miss G Want – Framlingham, (1)
- (England) Georgina Woodhouse – Taunton, (1)
- (Ireland) Lilian Cole – Exeter, (1)
- (Wales) C Jones – Tenby, (1)
- (Scotland) Jane Meikle – Moffat, (1)
- (England) Miss Hutton – Edgbaston, (1)
- (United Kingdom) Mrs Hornby – Bournemouth, (1)
- (United Kingdom) M Leslie – Eastbourne, (1)
- (United Kingdom) Miss Bryant – Portishead, (1)

== Statistical summary ==
=== Singles ===
- Total Tournaments (25)
- Most Titles: (England) Maud Watson (3)
- Most Finals: (England) Maud Watson (3)
- Most Matches Played: (England) Maud Watson (11)
- Most Matches Won: (England) Maud Watson (11)
- Match Winning %: (England) Maud Watson (100%)
- Most Tournaments Played: (England) Maud Watson (3)

=== Doubles ===
- Total Tournaments (9)
- Most Titles: (England) Lilian Watson & (England) Maud Watson (3)
- Most Finals: (England) Lilian Watson & (England) Maud Watson (3)

=== Mix doubles ===
- Total Tournaments (16)
- Most Titles: (England) Florence Mardall & (England) Maud Watson (2)
- Most Finals: (England) Florence Mardall & (England) Maud Watson (2)
