= Cambridge FA =

Cambridge FA may refer to:

- Cambridgeshire County Football Association
- Cambridge University Football Association
