= 1884 in sports =

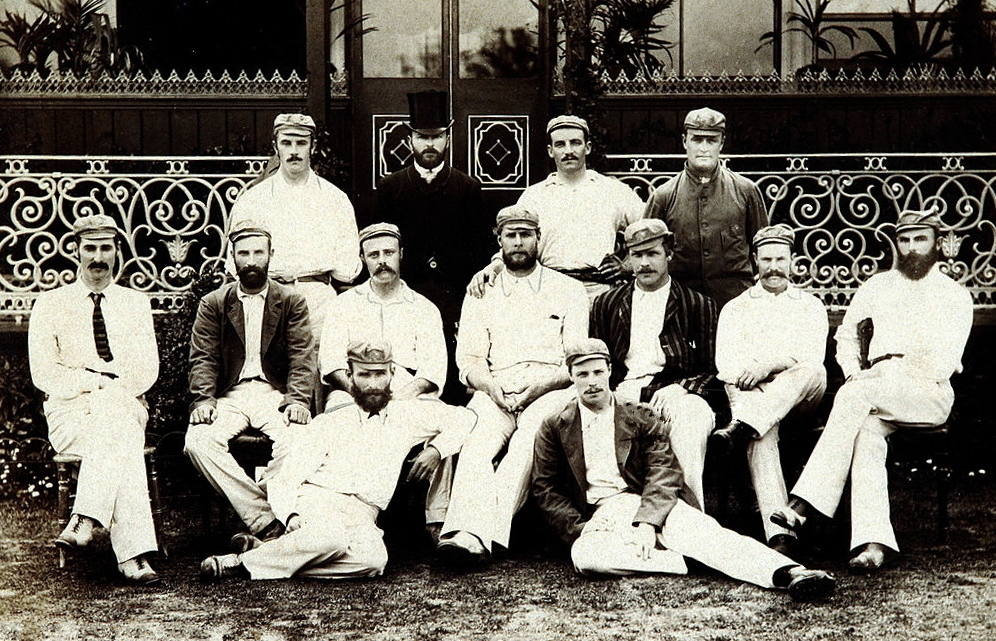
1884 Australia national cricket team

1884 in sports describes the year's events in world sport.

== Athletics ==
- USA Outdoor Track and Field Championships

== American football ==
College championship

- College football national championship – Yale Bulldogs

Events

- Amos Alonzo Stagg enters Yale University as a divinity student and, a natural athlete, joins the university's football team.
- 25 October — The Yale Bulldogs defeat Dartmouth, 113–0. This is the first college football game where one team scores over 100 points and also the first time one team scores over 100 points while the opposing team scores zero.
- 29 October — The next week, the Princeton Tigers outscore Lafayette, 140–0.

== Association football ==
England

- FA Cup final – Blackburn Rovers 2–1 Queen's Park (Glasgow) at The Oval. Blackburn Rovers is the first extant club to win the FA Cup.
- Everton moves as tenant to Anfield, a newly enclosed ground off Anfield Road, Liverpool.
- Derby County founded by Derbyshire CCC to provide a winter activity for players and supporters.
- Leicester City founded as Leicester Fosse.

Scotland

- Scottish Cup final – Queen's Park win by a walkover after Vale of Leven fail to appear

Australia

- The Anglo-Australian Football Association is created as a separate association for the colony of Victoria.
- The Anglo-Queensland Football Association, now Football Queensland, is founded.

== Australian Rules Football ==
- Victorian Football Association premiers - Geelong.
- SANFL premiers - Port Adelaide.

== Canadian Football ==
- The Canadian Rugby Football Union is founded as a regulatory body for Canadian Football.
- Montreal wins the first Rugby Football Dominion Championship by defeating Toronto 30-0.
- The Quebec Challenge Cup is won by Montreal after defeating Britannia 1-0.

== Baseball ==
National championship

- Inauguration of the National League v. American Association fixture, sometimes called the "Original World Series" – Providence Grays (NL) defeats New York Metropolitans (AA) 3 games to nil.

Events

- Ned Williamson hits 27 home runs for the Chicago White Stockings, establishing a record that will last for 35 years. He nearly doubles the record of 14 set the season before by Harry Stovey.
- Moses Fleetwood Walker becomes the first black American major league baseball player when he makes his American Association league debut for the Toledo Blue Stockings.

== Boxing ==
Events

- The first of the modern World titles is recognised with Jack (Nonpareil) Dempsey as the original World Middleweight Champion. The weight limit for middleweights at this time is 154 pounds. Dempsey will hold the title until 1891.
- American heavyweight champion John L. Sullivan faces a number of challengers but none of them last more than four rounds. Sullivan is very active on the exhibition circuit.

Lineal world champions

- World Middleweight Championship – Jack Nonpareil Dempsey

== Canadian football ==
Events

- The Canadian Rugby Football Union, forerunner of the Canadian Football League, is established.

== Cricket ==
Events

- An Australian team tours England but loses the three-match Test series 1–0 with two matches drawn.
- Derbyshire suffer the ignominy of a perfectly bad season losing all ten of their county games
- In stark contrast Nottinghamshire come closer to an absolutely perfect season than any county side since, winning nine games and being three wickets shy of victory in their tenth

England

- Champion County – Nottinghamshire
- Most runs – Lord Harris 1,417 @ 33.73 (HS 112*)
- Most wickets – Fred Spofforth 207 @ 12.82 (BB 8–62)

Australia

- Most runs – Billy Murdoch 567 @ 113.40 (HS 279*)
- Most wickets – Joey Palmer 29 @ 17.51 (BB 6–72)

== Gaelic games ==
Events

- 1 November — Gaelic Athletic Association is founded at Hayes' Hotel in Thurles, County Tipperary, to promote hurling and Gaelic football. The foundation date has significance as Samhain: according to legend the day the Fianna fell from power.

== Golf ==
Major tournaments

- British Open – Jack Simpson

== Horse racing ==
England

- Grand National – Voluptuary
- 1,000 Guineas Stakes – Busybody
- 2,000 Guineas Stakes – Scot Free
- The Derby – dead heat between Harvester and St. Gatien
- The Oaks – Busybody
- St. Leger Stakes – The Lambkin

Australia

- Melbourne Cup – Malua

Canada

- Queen's Plate – Williams

Ireland

- Irish Grand National – The Gift (second successive win)
- Irish Derby Stakes – Theologian

USA

- Kentucky Derby – Buchanan
- Preakness Stakes – Knight of Ellerslie
- Belmont Stakes – Panique

== Ice hockey ==
- February 11 – The Montreal Victorias defeat the Ottawa Hockey Club 1–0 to win the second Montreal Winter Carnival ice hockey tournament.
- November 28 – The Montreal Hockey Club is founded.

== Rowing ==
The Boat Race

- 7 April — Cambridge wins the 41st Oxford and Cambridge Boat Race

== Rugby football ==
Home Nations Championship

- The 2nd series is won by England

Other events

- The 1884 New Zealand rugby union tour of New South Wales is the inaugural overseas tour by the New Zealand team

== Tennis ==
Events

- Inaugural women's singles championship at Wimbledon

England

- Wimbledon Men's Singles Championship – William Renshaw (GB) defeats Herbert Lawford (GB) 6–0 6–4 9–7
- Wimbledon Women's Singles Championship – Maud Watson (GB) defeats Lillian Watson (GB) 6–8 6–3 6–3

USA

- American Men's Singles Championship – Richard D. Sears (USA) defeats Howard A. Taylor (USA) 6–0 1–6 6–0 6–2

World

- The 8th pre-open era Men's Tennis tour gets underway 54 tournaments are staged this year the tour runs from 6 May to 21 December 1884.

== Tobogganing ==
Events

- Cresta Run constructed at St. Moritz in Switzerland
