= Charles Pyne Luck =

English tennis player and police officer

Charles Luck
- Full name: Charles Pyne Luck
- Country (sports): GBR
- Born: 22 January 1896 Badulla, Ceylon
- Died: 15 July 1944 (aged 48) Nainital, United Provinces, British India
- Turned pro: 1923 (amateur tour)
- Retired: 1925

Singles
- Career record: 27–5
- Career titles: 4

Grand Slam singles results
- Wimbledon: 3R (1923)

Doubles

Grand Slam doubles results
- Wimbledon: 2R (1923)

Charles Pyne Luck (22 January 1896 – 15 July 1944) was an English tennis player then later police officer in the Indian Imperial Police Service who competed at the 1923 Wimbledon Championships. He was active from 1923 to 1925 and won 4 career singles titles.

== Tennis career ==
Charles Pyne Luck was the son of Charles Frederick Luck, he was born in British Ceylon, on, 22 January 1896, and baptised at St Mark's Church, Badulla. In 1923 during a tour of Great Britain and Europe whilst a serving police officer he took part in eight tournaments. In March he played on the French Riviera circuit, where he took part in the Monte Carlo Championships and South of France Championships unfortunately he exited in the early rounds of both tournaments. Returning to England in the spring he picked titles at the Leicester Open and Warwickshire Championships.

In July 1923 he took part in the Wimbledon Championships where he reached the third round of the men's singles before losing to Donald Greig. He also reached the second round of the men's doubles partnering Henry Alfred Carless. Following the championships at Wimbledon he won another two singles titles at the Exmouth Open, and Budeleigh Salterton Open, and was a finalist at the Teignmouth Open. In 1925 he played his last known tournament at the All India Championships in Allahabad where he reached the semi finals.

== Military and Police Service ==
Charles took up an appointment with the Indian Imperial Police Service, joining as an Assistant Superintendent on 22 November 1915. He was then appointed to the Indian Army Reserve of Officers between July 1918 and August 1919, remaining throughout in India. On returning to the Indian Imperial Police Service, he served in various positions within the United Provinces until his last appointment was as Superintendent of Police, for Dehradun in 1941.

Charles enlisted with The 1st Battalion 131st United Provinces Regiment of the British Indian Army a unit founded in June 1918. During which he held the rank of 2nd Lieutenant, and served as a Company Officer.

== Family ==
Charles Pyne Luck married Gladys Mary Clark at, Allahabad, United Provinces, India, on 15 July 1924.
