= Lilian Pine-Coffin =

Irish-born tennis player

- Full name: Lilian Mary Olivia Pine-Coffin
- Country (sports): (Ireland)
- Born: 4 August 1863 Leixlip Castle, Leixlip, Ireland
- Died: 16 Jun 1919 (Age 55) Kensington, London, England
- Turned pro: 1883 (amateur tour)
- Retired: 1894

Singles
- Career titles: 6

Lilian Mary Olivia Pine-Coffin née Lilian Cole (4 August 1863 – 16 Jun 1919) also known as Lilian Cole Pine-Coffin was an Irish born tennis player of the late 19th century. She was active from 1881 to 1894 and contested 11 career single finals, and won 6 titles.

== Career ==
She played her first tournament in August 1881 at the Exmouth LTC Tournament, where she won the title against Eveline Belfield. In 1882 she retained her Exmouth title against Charlotte Taylor. In 1883 she failed to defend her Exmouth title losing to Maud Watson. That year she also took part in the East Gloucestershire Championships at Cheltenham in the mixed doubles event with Percy Hattersley-Smith, but were defeated in the final by Florence Mardall and George Butterworth. In 1884 she was a finalist at the West of England Championships held in Bath, Somerset in late where she lost to Edith Davies.

In 1889 she won the Teignmouth and Shaldon Open where she defeated Miss Richardson, and was a finalist again at Exmouth, but lost to Katharine Hole. In 1890 she won the Exmouth LTC Tournament against Katherine Hole, later that season she made the all comers finals of the South of England Championships losing to Ireland's May Langrishe. In 1891 she was a finalist at the Teignmouth and Shaldon Tournament losing to Violet Pinckney Exmouth event losing to Edith Austin. She won the Exmouth tournament again in 1892 against Constance Bryan.

In September 1893, she had also notably taken part in the Sussex Championships tournament in Brighton, winning the mixed doubles title with Ernest Renshaw and finishing runner-up in the women's doubles event with Edith Cole. She won a fifth title at Exmouth the same year against Constance Bryan 6-4 6–2. These were not her only successes in women's doubles and mixed doubles events during the course of her lawn tennis career. In 1894 she played her final tournament and won a sixth Exmouth title against Helen Jackson.

== Style of play ==
According to American Lawn Tennis writing in 1895 she was notable for being the first lady to volley “systematically” and go on to state.

“she commenced tournament play when she was about 13.” Unfortunately she often confined her play to the west of England. Her 1885 marriage took her off the circuit until 1888, when she reappeared at Exmouth. After many years of striving she finally won Exmouth in 1890 after many years not claiming the first prize. Widely praised for her smashes and volleys, Lilian garnered praise for her fair-mindedness and quiet gentility on court. Though compared to men in the strength of her net play and power in her wrist, the perception one gets is she was a lady through and through to her contemporaries".

— Lawn Tennis, American Lawn Tennis (1895). American Lawn Tennis Publishing Company. New York. pp. 121-122.

== Family ==
She was born at Leixlip Castle, County Kildare, Ireland, to Edward Campbell Stuart Cole, Esq and Olivia Anne Cole (née Stevenson), a daughter. She was granddaughter of lady Elizabeth Stanley, daughter of Edward Smith-Stanley, 12th Earl of Derby and Elizabeth Hamilton (Daughter of the Duke of Hamilton and famous beauty Elizabeth Gunning). She married Charles Edward Pine-Coffin, Withycombe Raleigh, Devon, England on 18 Aug 1885.
