= Cambridgeshire County Football Association =

Area sporting organization with 19th century origins

Cambridgeshire Football Association logo The Cambridgeshire FA Logo

The Cambridgeshire County Football Association, or simply the Cambridgeshire FA is the governing body of football in the county of Cambridgeshire, England. The Cambridgeshire FA was founded in 1884 and is responsible for running a number of cups at different levels across Cambridgeshire.

The highest senior men's competition is the Cambridgeshire Football Association County League which sits at steps 7-14 (level 11-18) of the English football league system and is a feeder to the Eastern Counties Football League

The headquarters of the Cambridgeshire FA is situated within the Redgate Stand at Histon Football Club.

== County Cups ==
Year	Competition	Holders
2011-12	Cambridgeshire Invitation Cup	Ely City
