= Bridge Road (Impington) =

Football stadium in Cambridgeshire, England

Coordinates: 52°14′31.39″N 0°06′51.33″E

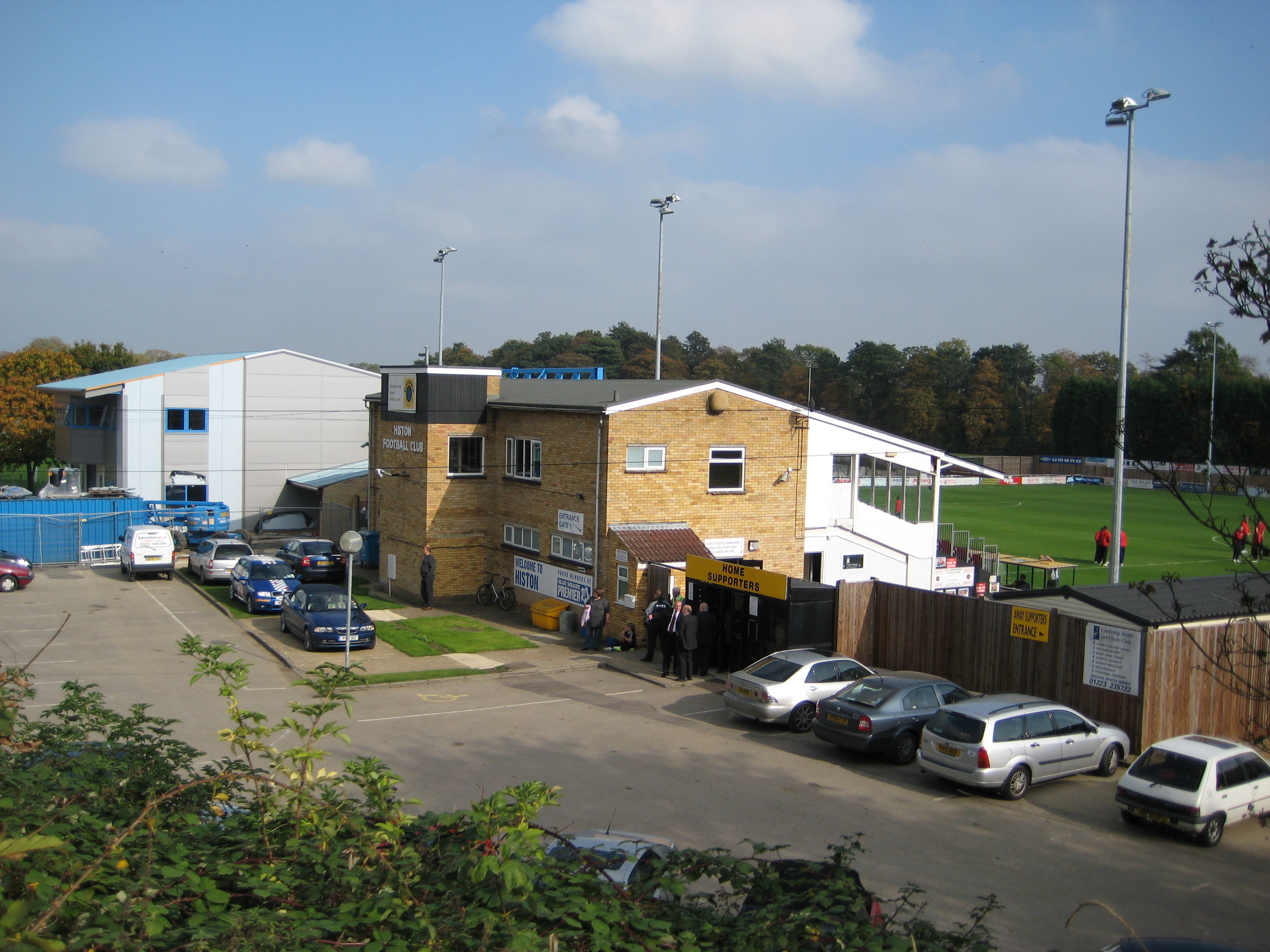
- Interactive map of Bridge Road
- Full name: Glassworld Stadium
- Location: Impington, England
- Owner: Histon Football Club
- Capacity: 4,300 (1,700 seated)

Construction
- Built: 1960
- Opened: 1962

Tenants
- Histon (1962–present); Cambridge City (2013–2015, 2018–2023)

Bridge Road, also known as the Glassworld Stadium for sponsorship purposes, is a football stadium in Impington, a small village connected to Histon in Cambridgeshire. The ground is owned by a trust called Histon Football Club Holdings, who guarantee the use of the facility for sports purposes. Histon F.C. rent the ground from the trust for free.

It is the home ground of Histon F.C. and has a capacity of 4,300 with approximately 1,700 covered seats. Recently the ground has gone under a transformation improving its facilities ensuring that it is of a high enough standard to allow the Stutes to be promoted to the Conference National – as recently as 2003 the club only had covering in the Main Stand for around 350 fans and a small 'temporary' covered standing area which held around 150 fans. The ground's main structures are two grandstands situated at the entrance to the ground, running down one side of the pitch. Opposite is a smaller covered stand, and covered terraces are found behind each goal. The away end is called 'Bridge Road' in reference to the road it runs adjacent to; it is behind the goal to the right of the main grandstand looking from it. The opposite terrace is called the Rec End by the Histon fans. It is mainly used by the home fans when games are segregated.

In 2007, the Cambridgeshire FA announced that they would be setting up a new headquarters at the ground, providing more new facilities including a 500-seater grandstand. The ground was graded as an A grade Non-League stadium on 7 January 2008 when delegates from the Football League passed it fit to play in Football League Two, should Histon become eligible through promotion.

Further ground improvements were started in early March 2008. Covered terracing for the whole of the 'Rec End' and a seated stand running the length of the pitch opposite the Main Stand were finished in April 2008. Now the stand has been completed, approximately 800 seats have been added to the total number, bringing the stadium's seating capacity to over 1700 seats.

The record crowd at Bridge Road is 4,103 for a FA Cup game against Leeds United on 30 November 2008.

The Chivers family used to own the land where the stadium is and they grew roses there, hence the rose in the Histon F.C. logo.

In October 2012, the main grandstand was renamed the Steve Fallon Stand, commemorating his achievement in getting the club up to the Conference National.

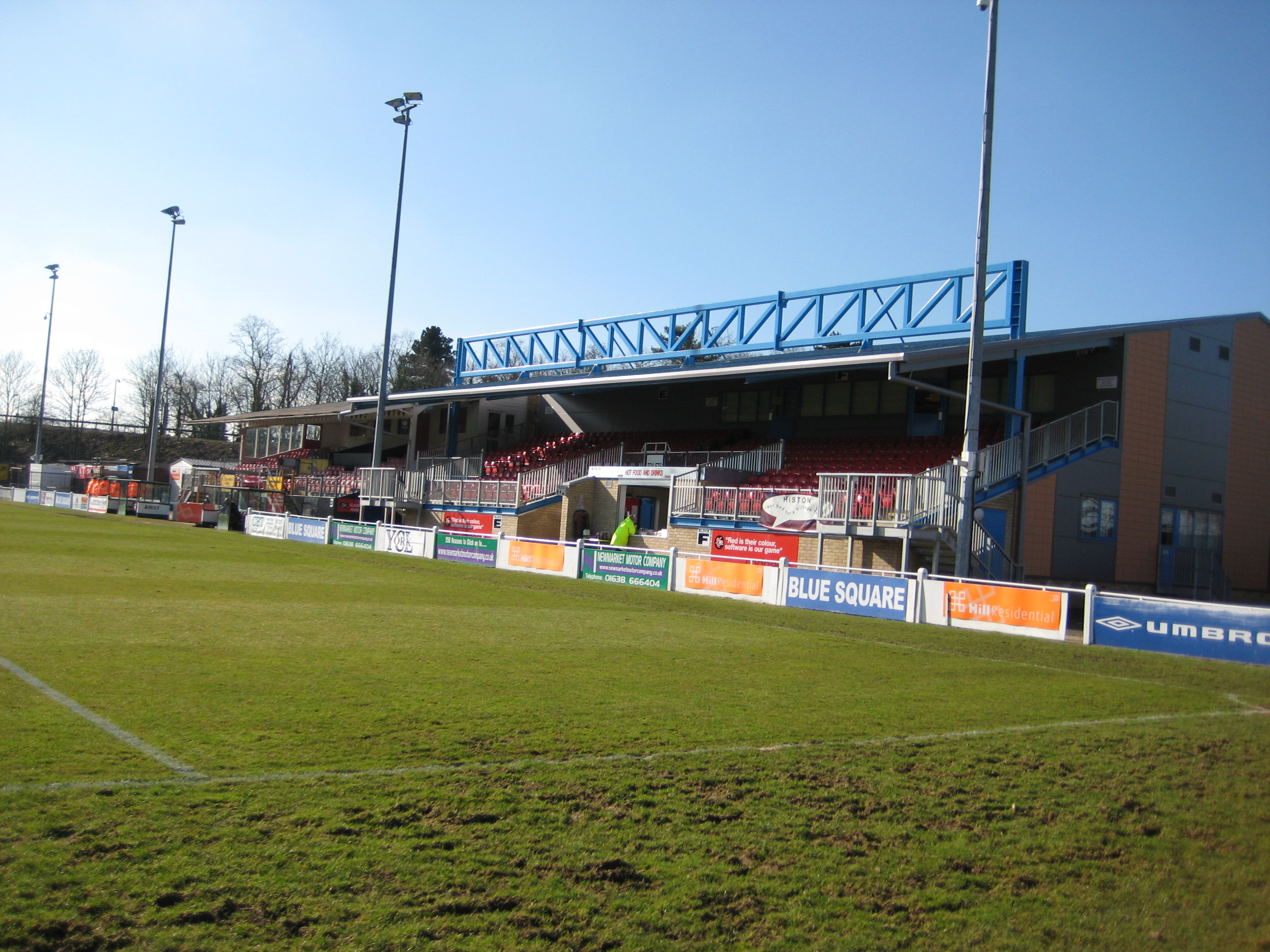
Cambs FA stand and the mainstand at Bridge Road pre-match.
