= Bridlington Lawn Tennis Tournament =

Defunct tennis tournament
- Founded: 1881; 144 years ago
- Abolished: 1930; 95 years ago
- Location: Bridlington, East Riding, Yorkshire, England
- Venue: Bridlington and Quay Cricket and Lawn Tennis Ground, Beaconsfield Tennis Courts

The Bridlington Lawn Tennis Tournament was an open outdoor grass court men's and women's tennis tournament founded in 1881 as the Bridlington Quay Lawn Tennis Tournament at Bridlington, East Riding, Yorkshire, England. This open annual event was held until at least 1930.

== History ==
The Bridlington Quay Lawn Tennis Tournament was an outdoor grass court men's tennis tournament founded in 1881 at Bridlington, East Riding, Yorkshire, England. This open tournament featured players afficlaited the Yorkshire Tennis Association, but also players from other British clubs. The tournament was originally organised by the Bridlington and Quay Cricket and Lawn Tennis Club till around the 1890s, at some point prior to 1919 it was the organised by the St John's Avenue Tennis Club, then later the Bessingby Road Lawn Tennis Club. This open annual event was later held at the Beaconsfield Tennis Courts and ran until at least 1930.

== Venue ==
The original venue for the tournament was the Bridlington and Quay Cricket and Lawn Tennis Ground. However records of original club, appear not to have survived. Records currently held by the modern day club, indicate in the club minutes a change in name from St John's Avenue Tennis Club to Bessingby Road Lawn Tennis Club shortly after the World War 1, on 12 April 1919. In 1950 the name was changed again to The Bridlington Lawn Tennis Club. The club is still operating today.
