= Arthur Veysey =

English footballer

Personal information
- Full name: Arthur John Veysey
- Date of birth: 6 February 1881
- Place of birth: Chorlton, England
- Date of death: 1930 (aged 48–49)
- Position: Winger

Senior career*
| Years | Team | Apps | (Gls) |
| 1899–1900 | Winchester College | | |
| 1900–1901 | Old Wykehamists | | |
| 1901–1902 | Glendale | | |
| 1902–1904 | Bristol Rovers | | |
| 1904–1905 | Wolverhampton Wanderers | 2 | (2) |
| Total | | 2 | (2) |
- * Club domestic league appearances and goals

Arthur John Veysey (6 February 1881–1930) was an English footballer who played in the Football League for Wolverhampton Wanderers.
