= Lausanne Autumn Meeting =

Defunct tennis tournament
- Tour: ILTF Circuit
- Founded: 1884; 142 years ago
- Abolished: 1946; 80 years ago
- Location: Lausanne, Vaud, Switzerland.
- Venue: Montchoisi Tennis Club
- Surface: Clay; Hard

The Lausanne Autumn Meeting was men's and women's clay court tournament founded in 1884. The tournament was played at Montchoisi Tennis Club (f.1883) Lausanne, Vaud, Switzerland until 1946.

== History ==
In 1883 the Montchoisi Tennis Club was founded as the English Lawn Tennis Club. In 1884 it staged its first autumn meeting, initially the tournament was played on hard asphalt courts. In 1898 the club moved to a new location and changed its name to Montchoisi Lawn Tennis Club, it also built six new tarmacadam tennis courts. In 1925 eight new clay courts were built. The Lausanne Autumn Meeting continued to be held until 1946 when it was discontinued.

== Finals ==
=== Men's Singles ===
(Incomplete roll)

Year	Winner	Finalist	Score
1884	(England) Rev. G.S. Money	(United Kingdom of Great Britain and Ireland) Alexander W. Miller White	6–5, 4–6, 3–6, 6–2, 6–5.
1905	(Australia) Les Poidevin	(Russian Empire) W. Gladky	6–4 6–1 6–2.
1910	(United States) R. Norris Williams	(Germany) Robert Kleinschroth	6–4 ret.
1912	(France) Max Decugis	(United Kingdom of Great Britain and Ireland) Hope M. Crisp	6–2 6–3 6–0.
1913	(New Zealand) Anthony Wilding	(Germany) Robert Kleinschroth	6–4 6–2 6–2.
1915/1919	Not held (due to World War I)		
1922	(Greece) Augustos Zerlendis	(Switzerland) Charles Henry Martin	6–3 6–4 6–3.
1925	(Switzerland) Boris Maneff	(Poland) Zbigniew Beldowski	7–5 6–3 6–1.
1941	(Switzerland) Hans Pfaff	(Switzerland) Jost Spitzer	8–6 6–1 6–3.

=== Women's Singles ===
(Incomplete roll)

Year	Winner	Finalist	Score
1925	(Switzerland) Lolette Payot	(Switzerland) Mlle de Crousaz	9–7, 6–1.
1928	(Switzerland) Elise Belzer	(Switzerland) Gabriela Szapary	6–2, 6–1.
1933	(Switzerland) Lolette Payot (2)	(Germany) Paula Heimann Stuck	6–2, 6–3.
1934	(Switzerland) Lolette Payot (3)	(Switzerland) Mauricette L'Huillier	6–3, 6–0.
1935	(Switzerland) Lolette Payot (4)	(Switzerland) Mlle C. Collet	6–2, 6–0.
1937	(Germany) Ilse Friedleben	(Austria) Etta Neumann	6–0, 6–4.
1938	(Switzerland) Mlle Devrient	(Switzerland) Mme Bridel	6–3, 6–1.
1941	(Luxembourg) Alice Weiwers	(France) Cosette Saint-Omer-Roy	2–6, 6–3, 6–3.
1946	(Italy) Elsa Riboli Gaviraghi	(Italy) Lucia Manfredi	6–4, 6–4.
