= Exmouth Open =

Defunct tennis tournament
- Event name: Robertson Viota Exmouth Open (1970-71); Exmouth Open (1972-75)
- Tour: ILTF Circuit (1913–1975)
- Founded: 1880; 146 years ago
- Abolished: 1975; 51 years ago
- Location: Exmouth, Devon, Great Britain
- Venue: Exmouth Archery, Croquet and Lawn Tennis Club (1880–1927); Exmouth Lawn Tennis Club (1927–1975)
- Surface: Grass outdoors

The Exmouth Open, originally called the Exmouth Lawn Tennis Club Tournament or simply Exmouth Tournament, was a men's and women's grass court tennis tournament founded in 1880. From 1890 the event was known as the Exmouth Open Tennis Tournament. It was hosted by the Exmouth Archery, Croquet and Lawn Tennis Club, Exmouth, Devon, Great Britain until 1927. It was then hosted by the newly founded Exmouth Lawn Tennis Club until it was abolished as a senior tour event in 1975.

== History ==
The Exmouth Archery, Croquet and Lawn Tennis Club was founded in 1879. In 1880 the club hosted the first Exmouth Lawn Tennis Club Tournament for men only. In 1881 the tournament became an open event for both men and women as well. The first winner of the open men's singles was England's Ernest Maconchy (later Brigadier General), and first winner of the women's open singles was Ireland's Lilian Cole. The event was one of the earliest English tournaments that featured a women's singles event.

In 1880s following the Wimbledon Championships it was part of what was known as the "Western tour" over the course of five weeks taking in the grass court events such as the Teignmouth and Shaldon Tournament at Teignmouth, the Torquay Lawn Tennis Tournament at Torquay, the Bournemouth Open Tournament at Bournemouth, and finishing off at the South of England Championships at Eastbourne.

In August 1888 a Battle of the Sexes charity tennis match was staged at the tournament, predating the modern famous match by 85 years, between Ernest Renshaw and Lottie Dod, Renshaw won but only just! From 1890 the event was known as the Exmouth Open Tennis Tournament. In 1968 following the start of the open era it was renamed to the Exmouth Open. The event was part of the Amateur Tour (1877–1912), the ILTF Amateur Tour (1913–1967) and the ITF Independent Tour (1968–1975). In 1970 the tournament was called the Robertson Viota Exmouth Open for sponsorship reasons. In 1971 it was known as the Bio-Strath Exmouth Open until 1972.

Former notable of winners the men's singles event include; Charles Lacy Sweet, Charles Walder Grinstead, Harry Grove, Ernest Wool Lewis, William Renshaw, Reggie Doherty, Ryuki Miki, Jaroslav Drobny. Former winners of the women's singles title included; Maud Watson, Blanche Bingley Hillyard, Phyllis Satterthwaite and Sue Barker. The final men's edition held in 1975 was won by Britain's Jonathan Smith, and the final winner of the women's singles was Czech player Jana Simonova.

== Finals ==
=== Men's singles ===
Incomplete roll

Year	Winners	Runners-up	Score
Exmouth LTC Tournament
1881	(England) Ernest Maconchy	(England) Thomas Hoare	6–3, 1–6, 6–4
1882	(England) Charles Lacy Sweet	(England) Pelham Von Donop	6–1, 6–4
1883	(United Kingdom) Charles Walder Grinstead	(United Kingdom) Teddy Williams	6–2, 6–5, 6–4
1884	(United Kingdom) Charles Walder Grinstead (2)	(United Kingdom) Erskine Gerald Watson	6–2, 6–2, 6–3
1886	(England) Harry Grove	(England) Henry E. Hunter Kent	6–2, 7–9, 6–4, 7–5
1887	(England) Harry Grove (2)	(United Kingdom) James Baldwin	6–1, 6–3, 7–5
1888	(United Kingdom) Ernest Wool Lewis	(United Kingdom) Herbert Chipp	6–1, 6–3, 6–3
1889	(United Kingdom) Ernest Wool Lewis (2)	(England) John Redfern Deykin	6–1, 6–2, 6–3
Exmouth Open Tennis Tournament
1890	(United Kingdom) Ernest Wool Lewis (3)	(Ireland) Manliffe Goodbody	6–2, 7–5, 2–6, 6–3
1891	(United Kingdom) Ernest Wool Lewis (4)	(United Kingdom) Horace Chapman	6–1, 6–4, 7–5
1892	(Ireland) Tom Chaytor	(Scotland) H. Walters	6–2, 7–5, 6–0
1893	(England) William Renshaw	(England) Harry Grove	6–2, 6–4, 6–3
1894	(United Kingdom) Harry S. Barlow	(Ireland) Tom Chaytor	6–2, 7–5, 4–6, 0–6, 12–10
1895	(United Kingdom) Reggie Doherty	(United Kingdom) Harry S. Barlow	7–5, 4–6, 6–4, 6–2
1897	(United Kingdom) John Mycroft Boucher	(United Kingdom) Arthur Riseley	6–1, 6–0, 6–4
1898	(United Kingdom) Roy Allen	(United Kingdom) Frank Riseley	6–4, 6–4, 5–7, 5–7, 6–4
1902	(United Kingdom) Sidney Charles Atkey	(United Kingdom) E. W. Church	6–3, 6–3
1903	(United Kingdom) B. Walker	(United Kingdom) M. A. H. Fell	6–0, 7–5
1907	(United Kingdom) Charles Gladstone Eames	(United Kingdom) R. F. J. Harrison	6–2, 6–0
1910	(United Kingdom) Roy Allen	(United Kingdom) Henry Reginald Fussell	6–2 6–2 ret.
1914/1919	Not held (due to World War I)		
1920	(United Kingdom) Henry Reginald Fussell	(Canada) Arthur John Veysey	5–7, 6–3, 6–4
1921	(United Kingdom) Herbert Amphlett Davis	(United Kingdom) Charles E. L. Lyle	4–6, 6–4, 6–1, 4–6, 6–2
1922	(United Kingdom) Charles Pyne Luck	(United Kingdom) Charles E. L. Lyle	6–2, 6–3, 1–6, 6–4
1923	(United Kingdom) Charles Pyne Luck (2)	(United Kingdom) Charles E. L. Lyle	6–2, 6–3, 1–6, 6–4
1931	(Japan) Ryuki Miki	(United Kingdom) John Pennycuick	9–7, 6–3
1935	(New Zealand) Cam Malfroy	(United Kingdom) Bob Tinkler	divided title
1936	(United Kingdom) Pat Hughes	(United Kingdom) William Michelmore	6–1, 6–3
1937	(United Kingdom) Henry Billington	(United Kingdom) Bob Tinkler	6–1, 6–4
1938	(United Kingdom) Henry Billington (2)	(United Kingdom) Bob Tinkler	4–6, 6–4, 6–3
1939	(United Kingdom) Harry Lee	(United Kingdom) Henry Billington	4–6, 6–4, 6–3
1940/1945	Not held (due to World War II)		
1946	(United Kingdom) Derrick Leyland	(United Kingdom) Jeffrey Michelmore	6–2, 6–4
1947	(United Kingdom) Derrick Leyland (2)	(United Kingdom) John K. Drinkall	9–7, 2–6, 6–3
1949	(United Kingdom) Paddy Roberts	(Dominion of Ceylon) Douglas Scharenguivel	6–3, 7–5
1950	(Dominion of Ceylon) Douglas Scharenguivel	(United Kingdom) Jeffrey Michelmore	6–3, 6–2
1951	(Dominion of Ceylon) Douglas Scharenguivel (2)	(United Kingdom) Jeffrey Michelmore	6–3, 3–6, 6–3
1952	(United Kingdom) Colin Hannam	(United Kingdom) D. S. Anderson	6–3, 6–3
1953	(United Kingdom) Bob Lee	(United Kingdom) Tony Starte	3–6, 6–2, 10–8
1954	(United Kingdom) John M. Ward	(United Kingdom) Geoffrey L. Ward	8–6, 6–2
1955	(United Kingdom) Darrell H. Shaw	(United Kingdom) D. S. Anderson	7–5, 6–2
1956	(United Kingdom) Bill Threlfall	(United Kingdom) Mike Sangster	8–6, 6–4
1957	(United Kingdom) Bill Threlfall (2)	(United Kingdom) A. N. Price	6–3, 6–3
1958	(United Kingdom) Mike Sangster	(United Kingdom) Peter Moys	6–3, 9–7
1959	(United Kingdom) Mike Sangster (2)	(United Kingdom) Freddy S. Field	6–1, 5–7, 6–1
1960	(United Kingdom) Mark Cox	(United Kingdom) Geoff Bluett	6–2, 6–0
1961	(United Kingdom) Alan Mills	(United Kingdom) Tony Pickard	8–6, 4–6, 6–1
1962	(Czechoslovakia) Jaroslav Drobny	(United Kingdom) Roger Becker	8–6, 6–4
1966	(New Zealand) Brian Fairlie	(New Zealand) Onny Parun	6–8, 7–9, 6–2
1967	(United Kingdom) John D. C. Crump	(South Africa) Rayno Seegers	7–5, 6–2
1968	(New Zealand) Brian Fairlie (2)	(New Zealand) Onny Parun	10–8, 7–9, 6–2
↓ Open Era ↓
Exmouth Open
1969	(United Kingdom) Paul W. Sussams	(United Kingdom) Lindsey P. Murphy	12–14, 6–2, 6–4
Robertson Viota Exmouth Open
1970	(Pakistan) Munawar Iqbal	(United Kingdom) Mark Joseph Farrell	6–3, 6–4
Bio-Strath Exmouth Open
1971	(India) Premjit Lall	(United Kingdom) Stephen Warboys	3–6, 12–10, 6–4
Exmouth Open
1973	(United Kingdom) Mark Joseph Farrell	(United Kingdom) Mike Collins	6–2, 6–4
1974	(Australia) Alvin R. Gardiner	(Australia) Graeme Thomson	6–4, 7–5
1975	(United Kingdom) Jonathan Smith	(United States) Peter Fisher	7–6, 1–6, 6–3

=== Men's doubles ===
Incomplete roll

Year	Champions	Runners-up	Score
Exmouth LTC Tournament
1881	(England) William John Down (England) T. P. Hogg	(United Kingdom) Spencer Cox (United Kingdom) G. M. Minchin	def.
1882	(England) Charles Lacy Sweet (England) Pelham Von Donop	?	
1888	(United Kingdom) Ernest Wool Lewis (United Kingdom) George Hillyard	(England) Ernest Renshaw (England) Charles Lacy Sweet	6–2, 6–4.

=== Women's singles ===
Incomplete roll

Year	Winners	Runners-up	Score
Exmouth LTC Tournament
1881	(Ireland) Lilian Cole	(England) Eveline Belfield	6–0, 6–0
1882	(Ireland) Lilian Cole (2)	(United Kingdom) Charlotte Taylor	6–4, 6–2
1883	(England) Maud Watson	(Ireland) Lilian Cole	6–4, 6–2
1884	(England) Maud Watson (2)	(United Kingdom) Agnes Watts	6–1, 7–5, 6–3
1886	(England) Maud Watson (3)	(United Kingdom) Blanche Bingley	7–5, 0–6, 6–3
1887	(United Kingdom) Blanche Bingley Hillyard	(England) Maud Watson	6–4, 6–4
1888	(United Kingdom) Blanche Bingley Hillyard (4)	(United Kingdom) Constance Bryan	6–3, 6–1
1889	(United Kingdom) Katharine Hole	(Ireland) Lilian Pine-Coffin	2–6, 7–5, 6–4
Exmouth Open Tennis Tournament
1890	(Ireland) Lilian Pine-Coffin (3)	(United Kingdom) Katharine Hole	6–1, 5–7, 6–4
1891	(Wales) Edith Austin	(Ireland) Lilian Pine-Coffin	6–3, 9–7
1892	(Ireland) Lilian Pine-Coffin (4)	(United Kingdom) Constance Bryan	8–6, 4–6, 6–2
1893	(Ireland) Lilian Pine-Coffin (5)	(United Kingdom) Constance Bryan	6–4, 6–2
1894	(Ireland) Lilian Pine-Coffin (6)	(United Kingdom) Helen Jackson	6–2, 6–3
1895	(United Kingdom) Helen Jackson	(Scotland) Jane Corder	6–0 3–6 6–3
1897	(United Kingdom) Violet Pinckney	(United Kingdom) Elsie Pinckney	w.o.
1898	(United Kingdom) Ellen Thynne	(United Kingdom) Edith Riseley	9–11, 6–3, 8–6
1899	(United Kingdom) Edith Riseley	(United Kingdom) Winifred Longhurst	6–3, 2–6, 6–3
1901	(United Kingdom) Mrs Thompson	(Netherlands) Amy Mooijaart	6–1, 6–1
1903	(United Kingdom) D. Compton-Lundie	(United Kingdom) Miss Brown	6–3, 6–4
1907	(United Kingdom) Aurea Farrington	(United Kingdom) Miss McDonald	6–0, 6–0
1909	(United Kingdom) Joan Retallack	(United Kingdom) Margaret Compton-Lundie	6–1, 5–5 ret.
1910	(United Kingdom) M. Fergus	(United Kingdom) Lois Putman Hawker	6–3, 2–6, 6–4
1911	(United Kingdom) Winifred Longhurst	(United Kingdom) Phyllis Carr	6–3, 6–3
1912	(United Kingdom) Joan Retallack (2)	(United Kingdom) M. Leacroft	5–1, ret.
1913	(United Kingdom) Phyllis Satterthwaite	(United Kingdom) Madeline Fisher O'Neill	6–4, 6–4
1913	(United Kingdom) Phyllis Satterthwaite (2)	(United Kingdom) E. White	6–0, 6–0
1915/1919	Not held (due to World War I)		
1920	(United Kingdom) Phyllis Satterthwaite (3)	(United Kingdom) M. Aplin	6–3, 6–0
1921	(United States) Elizabeth Ryan	(United Kingdom) Mrs Hall	6–1, 6–2
1967	(United Kingdom) Corinne Molesworth (2)	(Australia) Margaret Harris	2–6, 7–5, 9–7
1968	(United Kingdom) Corinne Molesworth (2)	(South Africa) Marianne Brummer	2–6, 7–5, 9–7
↓ Open Era ↓
Exmouth Open
1969	(United Kingdom) Jill Cooper	(United Kingdom) Rita Bentley	6–4, 3–6, 6–1
Robertson Viota Exmouth Open
1970	(United Kingdom) Rita Bentley	(United Kingdom) Nuala Dwyer	6–2, 6–3
Bio-Strath Exmouth Open
1971	(Australia) Susan Alexander	(Australia) Vicki Lancaster	6–2, 6–3
Exmouth Open
1973	(United Kingdom) Sue Barker	(United Kingdom) Annette Coe	6–3, 6–1
1974	(United Kingdom) Sue Barker (2)	(United Kingdom) Annette Coe	6–2, 6–2
1975	(Czechoslovakia) Jana Simonova	(United Kingdom) Jo Durie	7–5, 7–6

=== Mixed doubles ===
Incomplete roll

Year	Champions	Runners-up	Score
Exmouth LTC Tournament
1881	(United Kingdom) Georgiana Kindersley (United Kingdom) Henry Kindersley	(Ireland) Lilian Cole (Ireland) Thomas Arembery Tombe	2–6, 7–5, 7–5
1882	(United Kingdom) Charlotte Taylor (England) Charles Pine-Coffin	(United Kingdom) Miss Percy (England) Pelham von Donop	6–2, 6–3
1884	(England) Maud Watson (England) John Redfern Deykin	(United Kingdom) Alice Bagnall-Wild (United Kingdom) Harry Grove	6–2, 6–0
1886	(United Kingdom) Blanche Bingley (England) William Renshaw	(United Kingdom) Maud Watson (England) John Redfern Deykin	5–7, 7–5, 8–6
1887	(United Kingdom) Effie Noon (United Kingdom) James Baldwin	(United Kingdom) Blanche Bingley Hillyard (United Kingdom) George Hillyard	5–7, 7–5, 8–6
1888	(England) Lottie Dod (England) Ernest Renshaw	(United Kingdom) Blanche Bingley Hillyard (United Kingdom) George Hillyard	6–1, 4–6, 6–4
Exmouth Open Tennis Tournament
1891	(Wales) Edith Austin (England) Ernest Renshaw	(United Kingdom) Elsie Constance Pinckney (England) Francis Haskett-Smith	6–4, 8–10, 6–4
1894	(United Kingdom) Helen Jackson (United Kingdom) Harry Sibthorpe Barlow	(Ireland) Lilian Pine-Coffin (England) William Renshaw	6–1, 6–1

== Sources ==
- Club History. Exmouth, Devon, England: Phear Park Bowling Club.
- Dwight, James (1886).Lawn Tennis. Boston, Massachusetts, United States: Wright & Ditson.
- Fletcher, Kelly (23 September 2020). "Book Review: Tennis for the people". New Frame.
- Heathcote, John Moyer (1891). Tennis. London: Longmans, Green.
- Lake, Robert J. (3 October 2014). A Social History of Tennis in Britain. Oxford: Routledge. ISBN 978-1-134-44557-8.
- National Army Museum, Brigadier General Ernest Maconchy: Soldiers' Stories". ww1.nam.ac.uk.
- Nieuwland, Alex. "Tournament – Exmouth". www.tennisarchives.com. Netherlands: Tennis Archives.
- Routledge's sporting annual (1883). London: George Routledge & Sons.
- The Boy's Own Annual. London: Leisure Hour Office. 1880.
