= 1884 Kentucky Derby =

Horse race

10th Kentucky Derby
- Kentucky Derby
- Grade I stakes race
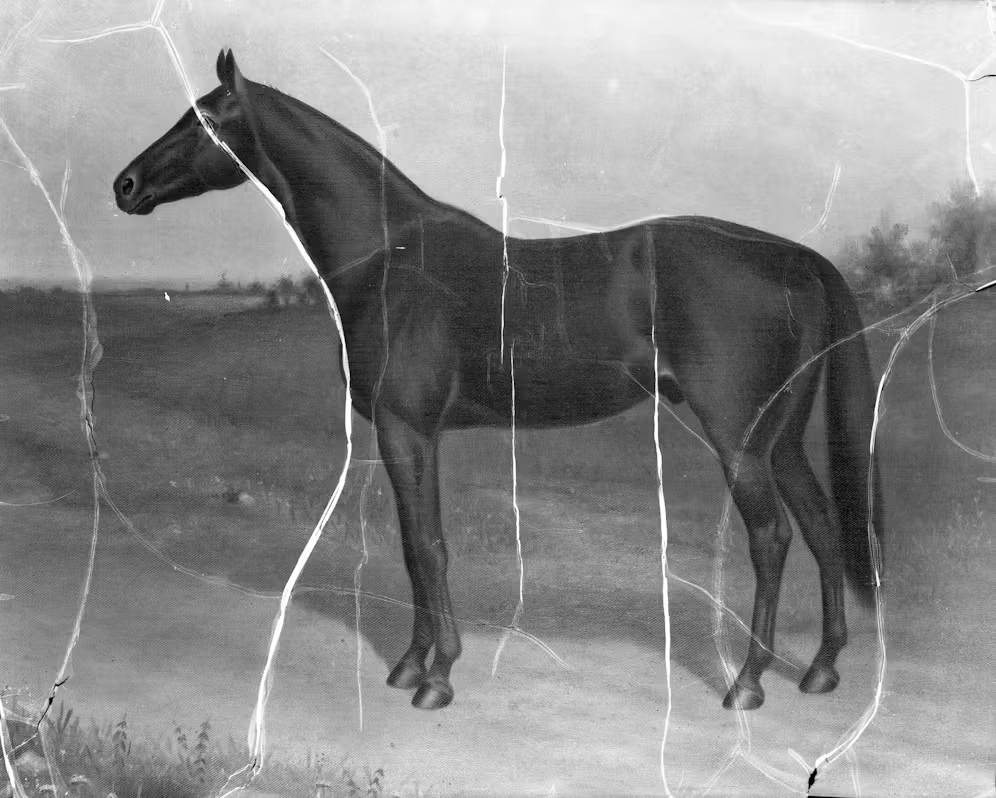
- Buchanan, winner of the 1884 Kentucky Derby
- Location: Churchill Downs
- Date: May 16, 1884
- Winning horse: Buchanan
- Jockey: Isaac Burns Murphy
- Trainer: William Bird
- Owner: William Cottrill
- Surface: Dirt

The 1884 Kentucky Derby was the 10th running of the Kentucky Derby. The race took place on May 16, 1884.

== Full results ==
Finished	Post	Horse	Jockey	Trainer	Owner	Time / behind
1st		Buchanan	Isaac Murphy	William Bird	Samuel S. Brown & William Cottrill	2:40.25
2nd		Loftin	Thomas Sayers		R. A. Johnson & Co.	
3rd		Audrain	C. Richard Fishburn		Thomas Jefferson Megibben	
4th		Bob Miles	Jim McLaughlin		James T. Williams	
5th		Bob Cook	E. Gorham		R. M. McClelland	
6th		Boreas	O'Brien		R. M. McClelland	
7th		Admiral	C. Taylor		Clay & Woodford partnership	
8th		Exploit	W. Conkling		Wooding & Puryear	
9th		Powhattan III	Dow Williams		R.A. Johnson & Co.	

== Payout ==
Post	Horse	Win	Place	Show
	Buchanan	$ 20.60		

- The winner received a purse of $3,990.
- Second place received $200.
