= Burbage Tennis Tournament =

Defunct tennis tournament
- Tour: LTA Circuit
- Founded: 1884; 141 years ago
- Abolished: 1884; 141 years ago
- Editions: 1
- Location: Burbage, Wiltshire, England
- Venue: Burbage Lawn Tennis Club
- Surface: Grass

The Burbage Tennis Tournament was a Victorian era outdoor grass court men's tennis tournament staged only one time in 1884 at the Burbage Lawn Tennis Club, Burbage, Wiltshire, England.

== History ==
The Burbage Tennis Tournament was an outdoor grass court men's tennis tournament staged only one time in 1884 at Burbage, Wiltshire, England The men's singles title was won by a Captain Taylor who defeated Charles Hobson Marriott.

== Finals ==
=== Men's singles ===
Year	Winner	Finalist	Score
1884	(United Kingdom) Captain William Taylor	(England) Charles Hobson Marriott	6–3, 6–2.
