= West Somerset ALTS Tournament =

Defunct tennis tournament
- Founded: 1879; 146 years ago
- Abolished: 1883; 142 years ago
- Editions: 5
- Location: Taunton, Somerset, England
- Venue: Batts Park
- Surface: Grass

The West Somerset ALTS Tournament also known as the West Somersetshire Tournament was a late Victorian period combined men's and women's grass court tennis tournament founded in 1879, and held for five editions only until 1883. The event was organised by the West Somerset Archery and Lawn Tennis Society, and was held at Batts Park, Taunton, Somerset, England.

== History ==
he West Somerset ALTS Tournament was a late 19th century grass court tennis tournament founded in 1879, and organised by the West Somerset Archery and Lawn Tennis Society. The society usually held the event at Batts Park, Taunton, Somerset, England. The first winner of the men's singles was Wale's Francis Escott Hancock.

== Results ==
=== Men's Singles ===
Incomplete Roll

Year	Winner	Runner-up	Score
1881	(Wales) Francis Escott Hancock	(England) R.P. Spurway	2 sets to 0.
1883	(Wales) Francis Escott Hancock	(United Kingdom) Harold Lewis Vaughan	6–3, 6–2.

=== Men's Doubles ===
Year	Winner	Runner-up	Score
1883	(Ireland) Arnold Felix Graves (United Kingdom) F. Scott	(United Kingdom) Kinoch (United Kingdom) A.L. Payne	w.o.

=== Mixed Doubles ===
Year	Winner	Runner-up	Score
1883	(United Kingdom) Harold Lewis Vaughan (United Kingdom) Mrs. Spurway	(United Kingdom) Otway Woodhouse (United Kingdom) Miss. Graves	6–2, 4–6, 6–5.
