= Clyde Park Tournament =

1884 tennis tournament in Massachusetts, US

Defunct tennis tournament
- Tour: USNLTA Circuit
- Founded: 1884; 141 years ago
- Abolished: 1884; 141 years ago
- Editions: 1
- Location: Clyde Park, Brookline, Massachusetts, United States
- Venue: Brookline Country Club
- Surface: Grass

The Clyde Park Tournament was a late 19th century men's tournament only once at the Clyde Park, Brookline Country Club, Brookline, Massachusetts, United States. The tournament was staged in May 1884.

== History ==
In 1882 the Brookline Country Club was mainly as a center for golf, but also other outdoor sports. In 1884 it staged men's grass court tennis tournament that featured three U.S. National Championships finalists and the 1884 US National Champion Howard Augustus Taylor. The format was played as a Round-robin tournament. The two player's who won the most rubbers played each other in the final. The tournament was won by William V.S. Thorne, the runner up at the 1884 U.S. National Championships.

== Finals ==
=== Men's singles ===
Year	Champions	Runners-up	Score
1884	(United States) William V.S. Thorne	(United States) Percy Knapp	6–0, 5–7, 7–5, 7–9, 6–4
