= Maidenhead Lawn Tennis Tournament =

Defunct tennis tournament
- Founded: 1883; 142 years ago
- Abolished: 1900; 125 years ago
- Location: Maidenhead, Royal Borough of Windsor and Maidenhead, Berkshire, England
- Venue: Maidenhead Lawn Tennis Club
- Surface: Grass

The Maidenhead Lawn Tennis Tournament was a combined men's and women' grass court tennis tournament founded in 1883. The tournament was played annually at Maidenhead, Royal Borough of Windsor and Maidenhead, Berkshire, England until 1890 before it was stopped. In 1893 it was revived and continued to be staged through till 1900.

== History ==
In 1883 the Maidenhead Lawn Tennis Club established the Maidenhead Lawn Tennis Tournament that event ran annually through till 1890 when it was discontinued. In 1893 the tournament was revived, and continued to be held through till 1900 when it was abolished.
