= Windermere Open =

Defunct tennis tournament
- Founded: 1881; 144 years ago
- Abolished: 1909; 116 years ago
- Location: Windermere, Westmorland, England
- Venue: Windermere and District Lawn Tennis Club
- Surface: Grass

The Windermere Open was a men's and women's grass court tennis tournament founded in 1884. the tournament was staged annually through till 1924 when it was discontinued.

== History ==
The Windermere and District Lawn Tennis Club was founded in 1882. In 1884 the club staged the first Windermere Open Lawn Tennis Tournament. The event was held annually - with the exception of World War I (1914-1919) until 1924 when it was abolished.
