= Championship of County Carlow =

Tennis tournament in Ireland

Defunct tennis tournament
- Founded: 1884; 141 years ago
- Abolished: 1950; 75 years ago
- Location: Carlow, County Carlow, Ireland.
- Venue: Carlow Sports Grounds
- Surface: Grass

The Championship of County Carlow was a grass court tennis tournament founded as the County Carlow Lawn Tennis Tournament. It was first staged in September 1884 . The tournament was organised the Carlow Lawn Tennis Club (f. 1878), and played on laid out courts at Lenham and Belmont, County Carlow, Ireland. The tournament was staged annually until 1950.

== History ==
The Carlow Lawn Tennis Club was established in 1878. The inaugural County Carlow Lawn Tennis Tournament first took place at Lenham and Belmont between 1 and 4 September 1884. The event was conceived by Horace Rochfort, a sports promoter from County Carlow. Due to the a large amount of entries submitted for the tournament, play was conducted in two locations, days one and two were at Lenham on the Lecky Tennis Grounds, and days three and four were played on courts laid out at the home of a Captain Thomas in Belmont. The second men's singles tournament was won by Englands Harry Thorpe. In 1908 tournament was renamed the Championship of County Carlow. In 1948 the championships was played as part of Carlow Lawn Tennis Club Open. The event continued through till 1950.

== Finals ==
=== Men's Singles ===
Incomplete roll:

Year	Winner	Finalist	Score
1884	(Ireland) R. Grove Annesley	(Ireland) J.E. Jameson	6-5, 6–5, 6–2.
1885	(United Kingdom of Great Britain and Ireland) Harry Thorpe	(Ireland) Frederick James Smith Leckey	6-3, 6–3, 8–6.

=== Women's Singles ===
Incomplete roll:

Year	Winner	Finalist	Score
1884	(England) Miss E. Watson	(Ireland) Miss Pack-Beresford,	def.

=== Mixed Doubles ===
Incomplete roll:

Year	Winner	Finalist	Score
1884	(Ireland) J.E. Jameson (Ireland) Valentia Wheler Annesley	(Ireland) Robert Saint Clair Leckey (Ireland) Miss Persse	6-1, 6–3, 6–2.
