= Duffield Open =

Defunct tennis tournament
- Tour: ILTF Circuit
- Founded: 1882; 143 years ago
- Abolished: 1960; 65 years ago
- Location: Duffield, Derbyshire, England
- Venue: Duffield Lawn Tennis Club
- Surface: Grass

The Duffield Open was men's and women's grass court tournament founded in 1882 as the Duffield LTC Open Tournament. The tournament was held at Duffield Lawn Tennis Club, Duffield, Derbyshire, England until 1960.

== History ==
In May 1882 the Duffield Lawn Tennis Club was founded. That year it established the Duffield LTC Open. In July 1934 the Duffield Open was played that featured the Derbyshire Championships that year. The tournament continued to be held annually until 1960 as part of the ILTF Circuit when it was discontinued. Duffield Lawn Tennis Club still holds an annual closed event call the Duffield Club Championships. Former notable players of the club who won the final edition this event in 1960, included Jimmy Tattersall who won the 1957 Wimbledon Championships – Boys' singles. The former player and later tennis coach Tony Pickard was also a member of the club.

== Venue ==
Duffield Lawn Tennis Club was founded in 1882. The club today is a registered LTA venue.
