= Worcestershire County Cricket Club Open =

Defunct tennis tournament
- Tour: LTA Circuit
- Founded: 1883; 142 years ago
- Abolished: 1885; 140 years ago
- Location: Boughton Cricket Ground, Worcester, Worcestershire, England.
- Venue: Worcestershire County Cricket Club
- Surface: Grass

The Worcestershire County Cricket Club Open or Worcestershire CCC Open was a late 19th century men's and women's grass court tennis tournament played at the Worcestershire County Cricket Club, Boughton Cricket Ground, Worcester, Worcestershire, England.. The tournament was staged in May 1884.

== History ==
In mid Victorian era Boughton was closely identified with the beginnings of Worcestershire county cricket. In 1865 the County Cricket Club was formed by Lord Lyttleton. In August 1884 a Worcester Cricket Club Open Lawn Tennis Tournament was first staged at the Worcestershire County Cricket Club, Boughton Cricket Ground, Worcester, Worcestershire, England.

== Finals ==
=== Men's Singles ===
Year	Winner	Runner-up	Score
1883	(England) John Redfern Deykin	(United Kingdom) Walter William Chamberlain	2–6, 6–3, 6–3.
1884	(United Kingdom) Walter William Chamberlain	(Ireland) Frederick William Knox	6–2, 6–4[.
1885	(England) John Charles Kay	(Ireland) Frederick William Knox	6–2, 6–3.

=== Men's doubles ===
(Incomplete roll)

Year	Winner	Runner-up	Score
1883	(United Kingdom) Walter William Chamberlain (United Kingdom) A. Fuller	(United Kingdom) A.L. Davies (United Kingdom) Hugh Vibart MacNaghten	4–6, 6–1, 6–4.
1884	(England) John Redfern Deykin (United Kingdom) Mr. Powell	(United Kingdom) Mr. Mitchell (United Kingdom) Harry T. Shapley	6–4, 3–6, 6–1.

=== Mixed doubles ===
(Incomplete roll)

Year	Winner	Runner-up	Score
1883	(United Kingdom) Henry Blane Porter (England) Miss Florence Mardall	(United Kingdom) Percy Hattersley Smith (United Kingdom) Miss Hill	6–2, 3–6, 6–4.
1885	(England) John Redfern Deykin (England) Miss Florence Mardall	(United Kingdom) Mr. Mitchell/ (United Kingdom) Miss Talbot	6–4, 6–2.
