= Mid Devon Lawn Tennis Tournament =

Defunct tennis tournament
- Founded: 1883
- Abolished: 1895
- Editions: 12
- Location: Eggesford, Mid Devon, England
- Venue: Mid-Devon Lawn Tennis Club
- Surface: Grass

The Mid Devon Lawn Tennis Tournament was a Victorian era combined men's and women's grass court tennis tournament first staged August 1883, organised by the Mid-Devon Lawn Tennis Club, and held at the club ground, Eggesford, Mid Devon, England. The tournament ended in 1895 and was not staged again due to a lack of participation.

== History ==
The Mid Devon Lawn Tennis Tournament was a combined men's and women's grass court tennis tournament on 28 August 1883. At the first meeting of this tournament Irelands William Norton Barry, won the men's singles, the men's doubles was won by Charles Lacy Sweet and Mr. H. Nash. The women's singles was won by Katharine Hole who defeated Mrs. Hoare wife of Thomas Hoare who competed at the 1879 Wimbledon Championships.

A short summary of the results of the inaugural meeting that concluded August 1883.

"Gentleman's Singles W.N. Barry: Gentleman's Pairs C.L. Sweet and H. Nash: Ladie's Singles: Mrs Hoare: Handicap Pairs A. Davis, Miss Davies.

— Lawn Tennis, Routledge's Sporting Annual (1883). p.117.

.

The Mid Devon Lawn Tennis Tournament ran until 1895, it was not staged again due to a lack of participation by players in the event.

Writing in 1891 the North Devon Journal was already reporting on its pending demise.

"The tournament of the Mid-Devon Lawn Tennis Club was brought to a close at Eggesford on Friday. There were very few visitors to the ground, and the play was not very interesting".

— Lawn Tennis, North Devon Journal (Thursday 06 August 1891). p.6.

.

== Sources ==
- Barry, William Norton. Thom's Irish Who's Who (1923). Wiki Source.
- Exeter and Plymouth Gazette Daily Telegrams. (Tuesday 28 August 1883). Exeter, Devon. England.
- Illustrated sports, with which is incorporated Goy's calendar of sports. London. 1884.
- Player Profile: T. Hoare". www.wimbledon.com. AELTC.
- Routledges Sporting Annual (1883) Lawn Tennis Tournaments of 1882. George Routledge and Son. London.
