= Teignmouth Open =

Defunct tennis tournament
- Event name: Teignmouth and Shaldon Open Tournament
- Founded: 1880; 146 years ago
- Abolished: 1939; 87 years ago
- Location: Teignmouth, Devon, England
- Venue: Teignmouth Lawn Tennis Club
- Surface: Grass & asphalt (hard)

The Teignmouth Open or Teignmouth and Shaldon Open Tournament was a combined men's and women's grass court or sometimes hard court tennis tournament. It was founded in 1880 and ran until 1939. It was staged by the Teignmouth Lawn Tennis Club at Teignmouth, Devon, England until 1939, when it was abolished.

== History ==
Officially known as the Teignmouth and Shaldon Open Tournament, it was a combined men's and women's grass court tennis tournament first staged in September 1880 at Lower Bitton, Teignmouth, Devon, England. During the 1880s it was a featured event of Pastimes' five week end of summer 'Western Tour', taking in Exmouth, Teignmouth, Torquay, Bournemouth and Eastbourne. It was staged by the Teignmouth Lawn Tennis Club at Teignmouth, Devon, England until 1939, when it was abolished.

Winners of the men's singles included Ernest Wool Lewis, Herbert Chipp, Manliffe Goodbody, William Renshaw, Wilberforce Eaves, Harry Grove, Harry Sibthorpe Barlow, Les Poidevin and Henry Billington. Women's singles title winners included Maud Watson, Violet Pinckney, Alice Pickering, Kathleen Lidderdale, and Madge Slaney.

== Venue ==
Teignmouth Lawn Tennis Club: (1880-1939) The modern-day Teignmouth Tennis Club forms part of a specialised Tennis Academy located at the Trinity School, Teignmouth.

== Surfaces ==
The tournament was played predominantly on grass courts except for the 1882 to 1884 editions, when it was played on hard asphalt courts.

== Finals ==
=== Men's singles ===
(incomplete roll) included:

Year	Winners	Runner-up	Score
1880	(England) Ernest Maconchy	(England) W.B. Young	?
1881	(England) Champion Russell	(England) Charles John Cole	?
1882	(England) Humphrey Berkeley	(England) Arthur John Stanley	?
1883	(England) Arthur Stanley	(England) Erskine Gerald Watson	6–5, 6–5, 0–6, 6–1
1884	(England) Charles S. Wood	(England) William Parkfield Wethered	6–1, 6–1
1885	(England) Wilfred Milne	(England) H.C. Kent	6–3, 6–5, 6–2
1886	(England) Ernest Wool Lewis	(England) Robert Charles Thompson	6–1, 6–0, 6–0
1887	(England) Ernest Wool Lewis (2)	(England) Wilfred Milne	6–3, 1–6, 6–2, 6–3
1888	(United Kingdom of Great Britain and Ireland) Herbert Chipp	(United Kingdom of Great Britain and Ireland) John Redfern Deykin	6–0, 6–1, 6–0
1889	(United Kingdom of Great Britain and Ireland) Ernest Wool Lewis (3)	(United Kingdom of Great Britain and Ireland) Harry Sibthorpe Barlow	6–4, 6–2, 7–5
1890	(United Kingdom of Great Britain and Ireland) Ernest Wool Lewis (4)	(United Kingdom of Great Britain and Ireland) Albert Francis Stoddart	6–1, 6–1
1891	(Ireland) Manliffe Goodbody	(United Kingdom of Great Britain and Ireland) Horace Chapman	6–0, 0–6, 6–4
1892	(United Kingdom of Great Britain and Ireland) Wilberforce Eaves	(Ireland) Charles Henry Chaytor	6–2, 6–2
1893	(United Kingdom of Great Britain and Ireland) Harry Grove	(United Kingdom of Great Britain and Ireland) H. Davies	6–2, 8–6
1894	(United Kingdom of Great Britain and Ireland) William Renshaw	(United Kingdom of Great Britain and Ireland) Horace Chapman	6–2, 6–2
1895	(United Kingdom of Great Britain and Ireland) Harry Sibthorpe Barlow	(Ireland) George Ball-Greene	3–6, 6–1, 6–4
1896	(United Kingdom of Great Britain and Ireland) Arthur Riseley	(United Kingdom of Great Britain and Ireland) Frank Riseley	w.o.
1903	(United Kingdom of Great Britain and Ireland) Harold Michelmore	(United Kingdom of Great Britain and Ireland) J.S. Talbot	6–4, 6–3
1905	(United Kingdom of Great Britain and Ireland) Harold Michelmore (2)	(United Kingdom of Great Britain and Ireland) George Alan Thomas	6–2, 6–2
1906	(United Kingdom of Great Britain and Ireland) Harold Michelmore (3)	(United Kingdom of Great Britain and Ireland) J.S. Talbot	6–2, 6–4
1907	(United Kingdom of Great Britain and Ireland) Harold Michelmore (4)	(United Kingdom of Great Britain and Ireland) A. Dawson Jones	6–0, 6–0
1908	(Australia) Les Poidevin	(United Kingdom of Great Britain and Ireland) Harold Michelmore	6–8, 7–5, 6–4
1909	(United Kingdom of Great Britain and Ireland) Harold Michelmore (5)	(United Kingdom of Great Britain and Ireland) J.S. Talbot	6–4, 6–2
1910	(United Kingdom of Great Britain and Ireland) Hugh Walter Davies	(United Kingdom of Great Britain and Ireland) Arthur Riseley	6–0, 3–6, 6–2
1915/1919	Not held (due to world war one)		
1923	(United Kingdom of Great Britain and Ireland) Henry Alfred Carless	(United Kingdom of Great Britain and Ireland) Charles Pyne Luck	7–5, 9–7
1931	(United Kingdom of Great Britain and Ireland) G.R. Ashton	(United Kingdom of Great Britain and Ireland) Freddie Della Porta	6–1, 7–9, 6–3
1932	(United Kingdom of Great Britain and Ireland) Peter Graves	(United Kingdom of Great Britain and Ireland) J. Desmond Morris	2–6, 4–2, ret.
1933	(United Kingdom of Great Britain and Ireland) Leslie Erastus Cater	(United Kingdom of Great Britain and Ireland) George Godsell	9–7, 6–4
1934	(United Kingdom of Great Britain and Ireland) Leslie Erastus Cater (2)	(India) Athar-Ali Fyzee	6–3, 6–4
1935	(United Kingdom of Great Britain and Ireland) Henry Billington	(United Kingdom of Great Britain and Ireland) Leslie Erastus Cater	2–6, 6–3, 6–0
1936	(United Kingdom of Great Britain and Ireland) Henry Billington (2)	(United Kingdom of Great Britain and Ireland) Herbert Amphlett Davis	6–2, 6–4
1937	(New Zealand) Alan Stedman	(United Kingdom of Great Britain and Ireland) Freddie Della Porta	6–1, 7–9, 6–3
1939	(United Kingdom of Great Britain and Ireland) Ernest G. Roper	(United Kingdom of Great Britain and Ireland) E.H. Coles	6–3, 6–0
	Abolished		
