= 1892 men's tennis season =

1892 Men's Tennis Season
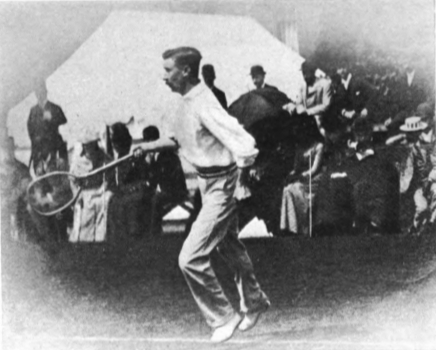
- Harry Barlow is finalist at the Northern Championships, and title leader for the second consecutive season winning 7 events from 9 finals.

Details
- Duration: 3 January – 29 December
- Edition: 17th
- Tournaments: 142

Achievements (singles)
- Most titles: (United Kingdom) Harry S. Barlow (7)
- Most finals: (United Kingdom) Harry S. Barlow (9)

The 1892 Men's Tennis Season was a worldwide tennis circuit composed of 142 major, national, regional, provincial, state, county, metropolitan, city and regular tournaments.

The season began on 3 January in Cape Town, South Africa and ended on 29 December in Dunedin, New Zealand.

== Season summary ==
The 1892 men's tennis season began on 3 January with the Western Province Championships held in Cape Town, South Africa that ended on 10 January, the singles event was won by Edward Fuller who defeated Edgbert Garcia.

At the end of May at the first major event of the season the Irish Lawn Tennis Championships in Dublin, Ireland concluded in an all English final Ernest Renshaw defeats holder Ernest Wool Lewis in four sets.

In mid June in Liverpool, England at the second major tournament of the year the Northern Championships the men's singles title goes to Irelands Joshua Pim who edges England's Harry S. Barlow three sets to one.

At the end of the first week of July at the third major event of the season, the Wimbledon Championships Irelands Joshua Pim reaches a second consecutive major final, but is denied the title losing in four sets to England's Wilfred Baddeley.

In August the fourth and final major tournament of the year the U.S. National Championships concludes on the 31st at Newport, RI, United States, the mens singles event is won by Oliver Campbell who collects a third consecutive and final title defeating Fred Hovey in four sets.

The 1892 season ends on 29 December at the New Zealand Lawn Tennis Association Championships in Dunedin, New Zealand that is won by Minden Fenwick who takes five sets to defeat Richard Harman.

== Season results ==
Notes: Hard includes outdoor asphalt, cement, concrete courts. The British LTA classifies clay as a hard court, the U.S Indoor Championships were played on a wood court overlayed with rubber matting.

Key

Major events National events Professional events Worldwide events	Surface & Setting Hard (14) Clay (34) Grass (88) Wood/Rubber - indoor (1) Wood - indoor (1) Unknown (3)

=== January ===
Ended	Tournament	Winner	Finalist	Semifinalist	Quarterfinalist
10 Jan.	Western Province Championships; Cape Town, South Africa; Grass	(Cape Colony) Edward Fuller def.	(Cape Colony) Edgbert Garcia		

=== February ===
Ended	Tournament	Winner	Finalist	Semifinalist	Quarterfinalist
20 Feb.	Southern California Midwinter Invitation; Riverside, United States; Cement	(United States) Theodore Coulter def.	(United States) Henry Germaine		
27 Feb.	Bengal Championships; Calcutta, India; Grass	(United Kingdom) Reginald Gamble def.	(Scotland) James H. Hechle		

=== March ===
Ended	Tournament	Winner	Finalist	Semifinalist	Quarterfinalist
12 Mar.	Punjab Championships; Lahore, India; Grass	(United Kingdom) R. D. Spencer walkover	(Scotland) Henry Fleming		
15 Mar.	Bombay Gymkhana Club Tournament; Bombay, India; Grass	(United Kingdom) C. S. Smith def.	(United Kingdom) Pelham von Donop		
19 Mar.	South Australian Championships; Adelaide, Australia; Asphalt	(Australia) John Baker; 14-12 games	(Australia) Leo Kaines		
21 Mar.	Magnolia Springs Open; Magnolia Springs, United States; Cement	(United States) Frank Beach; 6-2, 6-2, 6-4	(United States) John Nichols		
25 Mar.	Tropical Championships; St. Augustine, United States; Asphalt	(United Kingdom) Charles Grinstead; 6-4, 6-3, 6-2	(United States) Frank Beach		

=== April ===
Ended	Tournament	Winner	Finalist	Semifinalist	Quarterfinalist
1 Apr.	Gulf Coast Championships; Tampa, United States; Cement	(United States) Albert Empie Wright; 6-4, 6-3, 6-2	(United Kingdom) Charles Grinstead		
9 Apr.	British Covered Court Championships; West Kensington, Great Britain; Wood (i)	(United Kingdom) Ernest Meers; 6-3, 3-6, 6-1, 6-2	(United Kingdom) Ernest Wool Lewis		
19 Apr.	Geelong Easter Tournament; Geelong, Australia; Asphalt	(Australia) Gus Kearney; 6-5, 6-4, 6-2	(Australia) Alec Chomley		
21 Apr.	South African Championships; Port Elizabeth, South Africa; Clay	(British Cape Colony) Andrew Richardson def.	(British Cape Colony) R. R. Davis		
27 Apr.	Buckley Trophy; Melbourne II, Australia; Grass	(Australia) Ben Green; 6-4, 6-3, 6-2	(Australia) Ulysses Brown		

=== May ===
Ended	Tournament	Winner	Finalist	Semifinalist	Quarterfinalist
8 May.	Danish National Championships; Copenhagen, Denmark; Clay	(Denmark) Folmer Hansen def.	(Denmark) ?		
9 May.	Harvard University Championship; Cambridge, United States; Grass	(United States) Malcolm Chace; 3-2 sets	(United States) Clarence Budlong		
14 May.	New South Wales Championships; Sydney, Australia	(Australia) Dudley Webb walkover	(United Kingdom) Wilberforce Eaves		
20 May.	Dublin University Championships; Dublin II, Ireland; Asphalt	(Ireland) Tom Chaytor def.	(Ireland) Alexander Porter		
20 May.	French Universities Championships; Paris II, France; Clay	(France) Georges Bosselin; 6-2, 6-5	(France) Andre Vacherot		
21 May.	West of Scotland Championships; Pollokshields, Great Britain; Grass	(Scotland) Thomas Hendry def.	(Scotland) A. W. Scott		
21 May.	Pollokshields Open; Pollokshields II, Great Britain; Grass	(United Kingdom) James Conyers; 6-1, 4-6, 6-0	(Scotland) Richard Millar Watson		
30 May.	Irish Championships; Dublin, Ireland; Grass	(United Kingdom) Ernest Renshaw; 1-6, 6-4, 6-3, 6-3	(United Kingdom) Ernest Wool Lewis		
30 May.	Fitzwilliam Purse; Dublin III, Ireland; Grass	(United Kingdom) Ernest Meers (2); 6-1, 8-6, 7-5	(United Kingdom) Harry S. Barlow		
30 May.	Southern Championships; Washington D.C. United States; Clay	(United States) Edward L. Hall; 4-6, 6-2, 6-0, 2-6, 6-0	(United States) Albert Empie Wright		

=== June ===
Ended	Tournament	Winner	Finalist	Semifinalist	Quarterfinalist
4 Jun.	County Dublin Championships; Dublin III, Ireland; Grass	(Ireland) Joshua Pim; 6-1, 2-6, 1-6, 6-4, 9-7	(Ireland) Frank Stoker		
4 Jun.	New York TC Spring Open; Manhattan, United States; Clay	(United States) Carman Runyon; 6-4, 6-2, 2-6, 6-2	(United States) Stephen Millett		
6 Jun.	Whitehouse Open; Edinburgh II, Great Britain; Clay	(United Kingdom) James Conyers (2) walkover	(United Kingdom) E. Conyers		
9 Jun.	Welsh Championships; Penarth, Great Britain; Grass	(United Kingdom) Harry S. Barlow; 6-4, 6-3, 6-2	(United Kingdom) Kenneth Marley		
11 Jun.	North of Ireland Championships; Belfast, Ireland; Grass	(Ireland) Frank Stoker walkover	(Ireland) George Ball-Greene		
11 Jun.	Cheltenham Championships; Cheltenham, Great Britain; Grass	(Ireland) Manliffe Goodbody; 6-1, 8-6, 7-5	(United Kingdom) Sydney H. Smith		
13 Jun.	Scottish Championships; Edinburgh, Great Britain; Grass	(United Kingdom) Arthur Gore walkover	(Ireland) Ernest Browne		
16 Jun.	New England Championships; New Haven II, United States; Grass	(United States) Edward L. Hall (2) walkover	(United States) Charles T. Lee		
18 Jun.	Northern Championships; Liverpool, Great Britain; Grass	(Ireland) Joshua Pim (2); 4-6, 6-1, 6-4, 6-4	(United Kingdom) Harry S. Barlow		
25 Jun.	Amackassin Club Invitation; Yonkers, United States; Clay	(United States) Carman Runyon (2) walkover	(United States) Victor M. Elting		
25 Jun.	Hudson River Championships; Hastings-on-the-Hudson, United States; Grass	(United States) Carman Runyon (3) walkover	(United States) Valentine Gill Hall		
25 Jun.	Tioga Athletic Club Open; Philadelphia, United States; Grass	(United States) Rodmond Beach; 6-3, 4-6, 6-4, 6-4	(United States) Marmaduke Smith		
25 Jun.	Yorkshire Championships; Hull, Great Britain; Grazs	(Ireland) Joshua Pim (3); 6-1, 6-4, 3-1, retd.	(United Kingdom) David Davy		
25 Jun.	Worcester Athletic Club Open; Worcester, MA, United States; Clay	(United States) Francis L. V. Hoppin; 3-6, 9-7, 4-6, 6-4, 6-4	(United States) Henry G. Bixby		
25 Jun.	Kent Championships; Beckenham, Great Britain; Grass	(United Kingdom) Harry S. Barlow (2); 4-6, 2-6, 8-6, 6-2, 6-3	(United Kingdom) Ernest Meers		
26 Jun.	French Championships; Paris, France; Clay	(France) Jean Schopfer; 6-2, 1-6, 6-2	(United States) Francis Louis Fassitt		
27 Jun.	Saranac Lake Open; Saranac Lake, United States; Clay	(United States) William Frazer; 6-3, 6-3, 4-6, 6-3	(United States) Burdett O'Conner		
28 Jun.	Fakenham Open; Fakenham, Great Britain; Grass	(United Kingdom) William B. Monement walkover	(United Kingdom) Francis W. Monement		
30 Jun.	Neighborhood Club Invitation; West Newton, United States; Clay	(United States) Fred Hovey (1st); RR	(United States) Malcolm G. Chace (2nd)		
30 Jun.	Fitzwilliam Club Championships; Dublin V, Ireland; Grass	(Ireland) Tom Chaytor (2); 6-1, 3-6, 9-7, 6-4	(Ireland) Grainger Chaytor		
30 Jun.	Puteaux Championships; Puteaux, France; Clay	(United States) Francis Louis Fassitt; 6-4, 5-6, 6-5	(France) Jean Schopfer		

=== July ===
Ended	Tournament	Winner	Finalist	Semifinalist	Quarterfinalist
1 Jul.	Central Park Championship; Manhattan II, United States; Cement	(United States) Edwin P. Fischer; 6-1, 8-6, 7-5	(United States) J. Parmly Paret		
2 Jul.	Middle States Championships; Montrose, United States; Grass	(United States) Richard Stevens, 6-3, 6-3, 6-1	(United States) Charles Sands		
3 Jul.	Waterloo Open; Waterloo, Great Britain; Grass	(United Kingdom) Andrew Mcfie; 3-6, 6-3, 6-2, 6-4	(United Kingdom) Jacob G. Brown		
4 Jul.	Somersetshire Championships; Taunton, Great Britain; Grass	(United Kingdom) Arnold Blake; 6-4, 6-2	(United Kingdom) Ernest Hancock		
4 Jul.	Pacific Coast Championships; San Rafael, United States; Asphalt	(United States) William H. Taylor; 6-3, 6-3, 4-6, 6-8, 6-3	(United States) Charles Hubbard		
7 July.	Wimbledon Championships; Wimbledon, Great Britain; Grass	(United Kingdom) Wilfred Baddeley; 4-6, 6-3, 6-3, 6-2	(Ireland) Joshua Pim		
9 Jul.	Westchester Invitation; Harrison, United States; Grass	(United States) Richard Stevens (2); 6-3, 6-4, 9-7	(United States) Edward L. Hall		
9 Jul.	Partridge Challenge Cup; Aburndale, United States; Surface	(United States) Fred Hovey (2); 6-0, 6-0, 6-1	(United States) Malcolm G. Chace		
9 Jul.	Englewood Open; City, Country; Grass	(United States) M. F. Prosser; 7-5, 9-7, 6-4	(United States) Charles Kell		
13 Jul.	Llandudno Open; Craigside, Great Britain; Grass	(Ireland) Manliffe Goodbody (2); 6-1, 6-2, 6-2	(United Kingdom) James Crispe		
13 Jul.	Burton-on-Trent Open; Burton-on-Trent, Great Britain; Grass	(Ireland) Frank Stoker (2); 6-1, 2-6, 6-3, 2-6, 7-5	(Ireland) Tom Chaytor		
15 Jul.	Western Pennsylvania Championships; Pittsburgh, United States; Clay	(United States) Thomas Ewing def.	(United States) Charles Buch		
15 Jul.	Wentworth Open; New Castle, NH, United States; Grass	(United States) Fred Hovey (3); 6-3, 6-4, 6-2	(United States) Henry Bixby		
15 Jul.	Anglo Dutch Open; Rotterdam, Netherlanda; Clay	(Netherlands) C. des Gras; 4-6, 6-3, 6-4, 5-7, 6-4	(Netherlands) F. De Ranitz		
16 Jul.	Western States Championships; Chicago, United States; Clay	(United States) Samuel T. Chase; 6-4, 6-3, 6-2	(United States) ]John Ryerson		
16 Jul.	London Championships; West Kensington II, Great Britain; Grass	(United Kingdom) Ernest Wool Lewis; 6-4, 6-4, 3-6, 4-6, 6-1	(Ireland) Joshua Pim		
16 July.	Natal Championships; Durban, South Africa; Clay	(Colony of Natal) Herbert Millar; 5-7, 3-6, 6-1, 6-4, 6-2	(Colony of Natal) T. Hellet		
16 Jul.	Seabright Invitational; Rumson, United States; Grass	(United States) Richard Stevens; 6-2, 6-1, 6-1	(United States) S. M. Allen		
16 Jul.	Tuxedo Invitation; Tuxedo Park, United States; Surface	(United States) Edward L. Hall (3); 6-4, 6-4, 10-8	(United States) Bill Larned		
16 Jul.	Nottinghamshire Championships; Nottingham, Great Britain; Grass	(Ireland) Frank Stoker (3); 6-3, 6-2, 6-2	(Ireland) George Ball-Greene		
20 Jul.	Warwickshire Championships; Leamington Spa, Great Britain; Grass	(Ireland) Joshua Pim (4)	(United Kingdom) Harry S. Barlow 7-5, 8-10, 6-3, 6-4		
22 Jul.	Evesham Open; Evesham, Great Britain; Grass	(United Kingdom) E. B. Platt; 5-7, 6-4, 6-8, 6-4, 6-3	(United Kingdom) A. E. Baker		
23 July.	Leicester Open; Leicester, Great Britain; Grass	(Ireland) Harold Mahony; 6-1, 6-2, 6-1	(Ireland) Joshua Pim		
23 Jul.	Midland Counties Championships; Edgbaston, Great Britain; Grass	(United Kingdom) Henry Nadin walkover	(United Kingdom) R.A. Bennett		
23 Jul.	Longwood Bowl; Boston, United States; Grass	(United States) Fred Hovey (4); 6-3, 7-5, 1-6, 4-6, 6-2	(United States) Edward L. Hall		
23 Jul.	Edgbaston Open; Edgbaston II, Great Britain; Grass	(United Kingdom) Harry S. Barlow (3); 6-4, 6-1, 6-4	(Ireland) Tom Chaytor		
23 Jul.	Middlesex Championships; Chiswick Park, Great Britain; Grass	(United Kingdom) Ernest Wool Lewis (2); 6-3, 6-4, 6-2	(United Kingdom) Ernest Meers		
27 Jul.	Northwestern Championships; Minnetonka, United States; Concrete	(United States) Victor M. Elting; 6-1, 6-4, 6-3	(United States) Juddy Belden		
28 Jul.	Witham Open; Witham, Great Britain; Grass	(United Kingdom) Rupert H. Smith def.	(United Kingdom) William Gray		
29 Jul.	Canadian Championships; Toronto, Canada; Grass	(United States) Fred Hovey (5) walkover	(United States) Fred Mansfield		
29.Jul	Northans & Beds Championship; Northampton, Great Britain; Grass	(United Kingdom) Rochfort Clark; 6-4, 6-3, 7-5	(United Kingdom) H. H. Maudley		
30 Jul.	Surrey Championships; Surbiton, Great Britain; Grass	(United Kingdom) Harry S. Barlow (4); 6-2, 6-2, 6-1	(United Kingdom) Horace Chapman		
30 Jul.	South Yarra Electric Light Tournament; South Yarra, Australia; Wood (i)	(Australia) William G. Balfour def	(Australia) Dudley Webb		
30 Jul.	Northumberland Championships; Newcastle, Great Britain; Grass	(Ireland) Tom Chaytor (3); 6-0, 10-8, 6-2	(Ireland) Harold Mahony		
30 Jul.	Southampton Invitation; Southampton, United States; Grass	(United States) Edward L. Hall (4); 4-6, 6-1, 6-1, 2-6, 8-6	(United States) Valentine Gill Hall		

=== August ===
Ended	Tournament	Winner	Finalist	Semifinalist	Quarterfinalist
1 Aug.	Manitoba Championships; Winnipeg, Canada; Grass	(Canada) F. R. Goodwin; 6-1, 6-3	(United States) A. F. Randall		
2 Aug.	Spa Cup; Spa, Belgium; Clay	(United Kingdom) E. R. Hodson def.	(France) Laurent Riboulet		
4 Aug.	Darlington Open; Darlington, Great Britain; Grass	(Ireland) Grainger Chaytor (2); 7-5, 6-3, 7-5	(Ireland) George Ball-Greene		
5 Aug.	North of Wales Open; Abergele, Great Britain; Grass	(United Kingdom) Sydney H. Smith; 8-6, 6-2, 1-6, 2-6, 6-3	(United Kingdom) Arnold Wolff		
6 Aug.	New York State Championships; Saratoga, United States; Grass	(United States) Percy Knapp; 2-6, 4-6, 8-6, 6-4, 6-0	(United States) Fred Hovey		
6 Aug.	Inverkip Rovers Open; Wemyss Bay, Great Britain; Grass	(United Kingdom) Henry G. Nadin (2); 3-1 sets	(Scotland) Richard Millar Watson		
6 Aug.	King's County & Ormonde Tournament; Parsonstown, Ireland; Grass	(Ireland) Manliffe Goodbody (3) walkover	(Ireland) Herbert Craig		
6 Aug.	Isle of Man Championships; Castletown, Isle of Man; Grass	(Isle of Man) Horatio Callow def.	(Isle of Man) Thomas Moffatt		
6 Aug.	Sheffield & Hallamshire Tournament; Sheffield, Great Britain; Grass	(Australia) Arthur Carvosso; 8-6, 6-1, 6-1	(United Kingdom) Tancred Cummins		
6 Aug.	Exmouth Open; Exmouth, Great Britain; Grass	(Ireland) Tom Chaytor (4); 6-2, 7-5, 6-0	(United Kingdom) Harold Walters		
7 Aug.	Castle Wemyss Cup; Wemyss Bay II , Great Britain; Grass	(United Kingdom) Henry G. Nadin (3); 4-6, 6-3, 6-3, 6-4	(Scotland) Richard Millar Watson		
10 Aug.	Colchester Championship; Colchester, Great Britain; Surface	(United Kingdom) Henry Knox; 6-4, 6-3, 6-3	(United Kingdom) Cecil E. Owen		
11 Aug.	Scheveningen International; Scheveningen, Netherlands; Cement	(United Kingdom) C. W. Robinson; 4-6, 6-3, 7-5	(United States) M. Tesschemacher		
12 Aug.	Teignmouth & Shaldon Open; Teignmouth, Great Britain; Grass	(United Kingdom) Wilberforce Eaves; 6-2, 6-2	(Ireland) Charles Chaytor		
13 Aug.	Queensland Championships; Brisbane, Australia; Grass	(Australia) Peter MacGregor walkover	(Australia) Alfred Taylor		
13 Aug.	Derbyshire Championships; Buxton, Great Britain; Grass	(Ireland) Grainger Chaytor (3) walkover	(Ireland) Tom Chaytor		
13 Aug.	Nahant Invitation; Nahant, United States; Clay	(United States) Edward L. Hall (5); Round Robin	(United States) Malcolm G. Chace		
13 Aug.	North Wales Championships; Denbigh, Great Britain; Grass	(Ireland) Herbert Craig; 6-4, 10-8, 6-3	(United Kingdom) Arnold Wolff		
13 Aug.	North Riding Championships; Whitby, Great Britain; Grass	(United Kingdom) Frederick Bradbury; 6-2, 2-6, 6-2, 6-0	(United Kingdom) Henry G. Nadin		
13 Aug.	Cooperstown Open; Cooperstown, United States; Surface	(United States) Russell Perkins walkover	(United States) Marion Wrighr		
15 Aug.	Maritime Provinces Championships; Halifax, Canada; Clay	(Canada) C. Gaussen def.	(Canada) W. B. Ferrie		
16 Aug.	Exmouth Open; Exmouth, Great Britain; Grass	(Ireland) Tom Chaytor; 6-2, 7-5, 6-0	(United Kingdom) H. Walters		
17 Aug.	Maplewood Hotel Tournament; Bethlehem, United States; Clay	(United States) William Garrison; 6-1, 6-0, 6-2	(United States) James Ferry		
20 Aug.	Pacific Northwest Championships; Tacoma, United States; Clay	(Canada) J. F. Foulkes; 7-5, 4-6, 6-3, 6-1	(United States) Abraham Barker		
20 Aug.	Essex Championships; Chingford, Great Britain; Grass	(United Kingdom) Arthur Gore (2); 6-4, 6-3, 6-1	(United Kingdom) Charles G. Eames		
20 Aug.	Kebo Valley Open; Bar Harbor, United States; Clay	(United States) Bob Wrenn; 4-6, 6-3, 6-3, 6-4	(United States) Edward L. Hall		
20 Aug.	South Wales Championships; Tenby, Great Britain; Grass	(Wales) F. H. Morris; 5-6, 6-3, 6-1, 3-6, 6-4	(Ireland) Patrick Hagarty		
20 Aug.	Taylor Challenge Cup; Scarborough II, Great Britain; Grass	(United Kingdom) Harry S. Barlow (5); 6-0, 6-3, 3-6, 6-1	(United Kingdom) Ernest Crawley		
20 Aug.	Seaton Open; Seaton, Great Britain; Grass	(United Kingdom) H. Walters; 6-4, 12-10, 6-1	(United Kingdom) F.D. Colt		
24 Aug.	Hilversum International; Hilversum, Netherlands; Clay	(Netherlands) J. Blijdenstein; 6-3, 6-3	(Netherlands) P. Vinkhuijzen		
24 Aug.	Zeist International; Zeist, Netherlands; Clay	(United Kingdom) A. Baron MacKay; 6-3 (one set only)	(Netherlands) Jonkheer de Pesters		
24 Aug.	North of England Championships; Scarborough, Great Britain; Grass	(United Kingdom) Harry S. Barlow (6); 5-7, 6-1, 6-2, 6-1	(Ireland) Grainger Chaytor		
25 Aug.	Falmouth Open; Falmouth, Great Britain; Grass	(United Kingdom) G. Scott; 6-3, 6-2	(United Kingdom) C. R. Broad		
27 Aug.	North of Scotland Championships; Elgin, Great Britain; Clay	(Scotland) Richard Millar Watson; 9-7, 6-1, 6-0	(United Kingdom) James Conyers		
27 Aug.	West Sussex Challenge Cup; Chichester, Great Britain; Grass	(United Kingdom) George Orme; 6-4, 6-2	(United Kingdom) Harold Carlton		
27 Aug.	Kearsage Tournament; North Conway, United States; Clay	(United States) Fred Mansfield def.	(United States) Fred Hovey		
27 Aug.	Bournemouth Open; Bournemouth, Great Britain; Grass	(United Kingdom) Horace Chapman walkover	(Ireland) Joshua Pim		
27 Aug.	Ontario Championships; Hamilton, Canada; Grass	(United States) Arthur F. Fuller; 6-1, 6-2, 7-5	(Canada) Reginald Moreton		
27 Aug.	East of Scotland Championships; St. Andrews, Great Britain; Grass	(Scotland) Henry Fleming; 7-5, 7-6, 8-6	(Scotland) Richard Millar Watson		
27 Aug.	Gore Court Championships; Sittingbourne, Great Britain; Grass	(United Kingdom) Wilberforce Eaves (2) walkover	(United Kingdom) A. R. Stephenson		
28 Aug.	Dinard Cup; Dinard, France; Clay	(United Kingdom) Arthur Gore (3); 6-3, 6-2, 1-6, 5-7, 6-3	(United Kingdom) Archdale Palmer		
28 Aug.	British Columbia Championships; Victoria, Canada; Grass	(Canada) J. F. Foulkes (2); 6-3, 6-3, 6-3	(Canada) Charles Longe		
29 Aug.	Championships of Hamburg; Hamburg II, Germany; Clay	(German Empire) Walter Bonne; 6-3, 6-2	(France) H. Bourchier		
30 Aug.	Colwyn Bay Open; Colwyn Bay, Great Britain; Clay	(United Kingdom) Arthur Firth; 7-5, 6-2	(United Kingdom) R.E. Smith		
30 Aug.	Maplewood Hotel Tournament; Bethlehem, United States; Clay	(United States) William Garrison def.	(United States) Albie Micham		
30 Aug.	Southern California Championships; Santa Monica, United States; Asphalt	(United States) Robert P. Carter walkover	(United States) Theo Coulter		
31 Aug.	U.S. National Championships; Newport RI, United States; Grass	(United States) Oliver Campbell; 7-5, 3-6, 6-3, 7-5	(United States) Fred Hovey		

=== September ===
Ended	Tournament	Winner	Finalist	Semifinalist	Quarterfinalist
3 Sep.	Niagara International Championship; Niagara-on-the-Lake, Canada; Grass	(United States) Arthur Fuller (2) walkover	(United States) J.P. Bowman		
4 Sep.	Divonne International Tournament; Divonne-les-Bains, France; Clay	(United Kingdom) T. A. White def.	(France) Jean Schopfer		
5 Sep.	Hitchin Open; Hitchin, Great Britain; Grass	(United Kingdom) Stuart Baddeley; 5-6, 6-3, 6-0	(United Kingdom) Leonard Elgood		
5 Sep.	Sussex Championships; Brighton, Great Britain; Grass	(United Kingdom) Wilberforce Eaves (3) walkover	(Ireland) Grainger Chaytor		
14 Sep.	South of England Championships; Eastbourne, Great Britain; Grass	(United Kingdom) Harry S. Barlow (7); 7-5, 2-6, 3-6, 6-3, 6-3	(United Kingdom) Wilberforce Eaves		
18 Sep.	Boulogne Championship; Boulogne-sur-Mer, France; Clay	(United Kingdom) Wilberforce Eaves (4); 6-3, 6-2, 6-2	(United Kingdom) Roy Allen		
18 Sep.	Montserrat Open; Plymouth, Montserrat; Clay	(Scotland) D. Jonson; 6-4, 6-2	(British Leeward Islands) William Branch		
20 Sep.	Championship of Germany; Hamburg, Germany; Clay	(German Empire) Walter Bonne; 7-5, 6-3	(German Empire) R.A. Leers		

=== October ===
Ended	Tournament	Winner	Finalist	Semifinalist	Quarterfinalist
8 Oct.	Metropolitan Championship of Sydney; Strathfield, Australia; Asphalt	(Australia) Septimus Noble; 6-2, 3-6, 6-0	(Australia) Frederick Wilkinson		
10 Oct.	U.S. Intercollegiate Championships; New Haven, United States; Grass	(United States) Bill Larned; 3-6, 6-3, 6-4, 4-6, 7-5	(United States) Malcolm Chace		

=== November ===
Ended	Tournament	Winner	Finalist	Semifinalist	Quarterfinalist
26 Nov.	Victorian Championships; Melbourne, Australia; Asphalt	(Australia) Ben Green (2); 9-11, 6-3, 6-3, 6-2	(Australia) William Balfour		

=== December ===
Ended	Tournament	Winner	Finalist	Semifinalist	Quarterfinalist
16 Dec.	U.S. National Indoor Championships; Chicago, United States; Rubber (i)	(United States) Samuel T. Chase def.	(United States) Charles A. Chase		
29 Dec.	New Zealand Championships; Dunedin, New Zealand; Grass	(New Zealand) Minden Fenwick; 1-6, 7-5, 9-7, 3-6, 6-4	(New Zealand) Richard Harman		

== Tournament winners ==
Players are listed by total titles won, Major tournaments are in bold.

- (United Kingdom) Harry S. Barlow, Beckenham, Eastbourne, Edgbaston II, Penarth, Richmond, Scarborough, Scarborough II, (7)
- (United States) Edward L. Hall, Nahant, New Haven II, Southampton, Tuxedo Park, Washington D.C., (5)
- (United States) Fred Hovey, Boston, New Castle NH, Toronto, West Newton, West Newton II, (5)
- (Ireland) Joshua Pim, Dublin III, Hull, Leamington Spa , **Northern Championships**, (4)
- (Ireland) Tom Chaytor, Dublin II, Dublin V, Exmouth, Newcastle-upon-Tyne, (4)
- (United Kingdom) Wilberforce Eaves, Boulogne-Sur-Mer, Brighton, Sittingbourne, Teignmouth, (4)
- (Ireland) Manliffe Goodbody, Craigside, Cheltenham. Parsonstown, (3)
- (United States) Carman Runyon, Hastings-on-Hudson, Manhattan, Yonkers, (3)
- (United Kingdom) Arthur Gore, Chingford, Dinard, Edinburgh, (3)
- (Ireland) Grainger Chaytor, Buxton, Darlington, Dublin IV, (3)
- (United Kingdom) Henry Nadin, Edgbaston, Wemyss Bay, Wemyss Bay II, (3)
- (Ireland) Frank Stoker, Belfast, Burton-on-Trent, Nottingham, (3)
- (United States) Richard Stevens, Harrison, Montrose, Rumson, (3)
- (Australia) Ben Green, Melbourne, Melbourne II, (2)
- (United States) Samuel T. Chase, Chicago, Chicago II, (2)
- (United Kingdom) James Conyers, Edinburgh II, Pollokshields II, (2)
- (United States) Arthur Fuller, Hamilton, Niagra-on-the-Lake (2)
- (Canada) J. F. Foulkes, Tacoma, Victoria, (2)
- (United Kingdom) Ernest Meers, Dublin III, West Kensington, (2)
- (United Kingdom) Ernest Renshaw, **Irish Championships** (1)
- (United Kingdom) Wilfred Baddeley **Wimbledon Championships** (1)
- (United States) Oliver Campbell, **U.S National Championships** (1)

75 other players won 1 tournament each

== See also ==
- 1892 women's tennis season
