= 1888 men's tennis season =

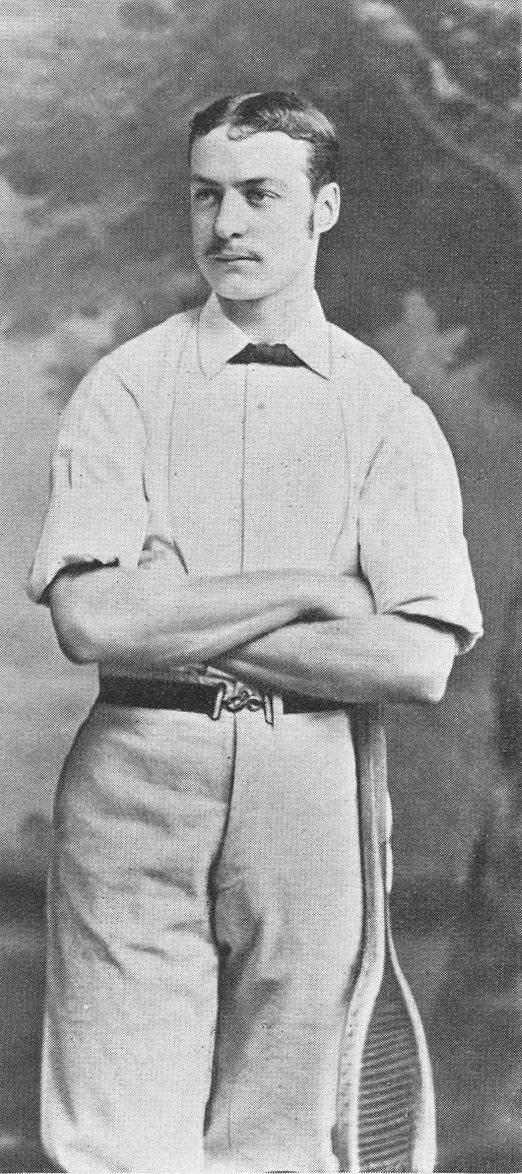
- Ernest Wool Lewis was title leader this year

Details
- Duration: 17 April – 29 December
- Tournaments: 129
- Categories: Important (4); National (5); Provincial/Regional/State (11); County (6); Local/other (2)

Achievements (singles)
- Most titles: (United Kingdom) Ernest Wool Lewis (8)
- Most finals: (United Kingdom) Ernest Wool Lewis (8)

The 1888 men's tennis season was a world wide tennis calendar composed of 129 major, national, professional, regional, provincial, state, county, city and regular tournaments.

The season began in January in Madras, India, and ended in December in Napier, New Zealand.

== Season summary ==
In 1888 the twelfth edition of the 1888 Wimbledon Championships was held, this saw the victory of Ernest Renshaw who defeated the Briton Ernest Wool Lewis in the final of the preliminary tournament by 7–9, 6–1, 8–6, 6–4 . Renshaw then defeated defending champion Herbert Lawford in the challenge round to claim the title for the first time. In the fourth edition of the men's doubles the brothers William Renshaw and Ernest Renshaw regained the title they had not been able to defend the previous year by beating the title holders Herbert Wilberforce and Patrick Bowes-Lyon in the challenge round per 2–6, 1–6, 6–3, 6–4, 6–3.

At the eighth edition of the Irish Championships the Briton Ernest Renshaw defeated James Willoughby Hamilton 6-4 5-7 6-4 3-6 6–2 in the final. In the U.S. National Championships, (today known as the US Open) held on the grass courts of the Newport Casino in Newport in the United States, the American Henry Slocum prevailed in the men's singles, defeating his compatriot Howard Augustus Taylor in 3 sets in the final of the preliminary tournament with the score of 6-4 6-1 6–0. Richard Sears after his seventh consecutive victory at the US National Championships no longer participated in the tournament so the victory was awarded to Taylor without playing the challenge round. In addition to the men's singles tournament at the Staten Island Cricket Club in New York, the doubles tournament was also held where Oliver Campbell and Valentine Gill Hall prevailed, beating Edward MacMullen and Clarence Hobart in the final.

In the New South Wales Championships in Sydney, the Australian Dudley Webb prevailed in the men's singles, beating his compatriot Charles W. Cropper in the final. In the British Covered Court Championships in London, one of the earliest tournaments in tennis history to be played on indoor courts, Ernest Lewis prevailed in the men's singles defeating Ernest George Meers.

== Season results ==
Included:

Notes 1: Challenge Round: the final round of a tournament, in which the winner of a single-elimination phase faces the previous year's champion, who plays only that one match. The challenge round was used in the early history of tennis (from 1877 through 1921), in some tournaments not all.

* Indicates challenger

Notes 2:'This is an incomplete roll of tournaments staged this year

Key

Major events
National events
Professional events
World wide events

=== January ===
No events

=== February ===
No events

=== March ===
Ended	Tournament	Winner	Finalist	Semi-finalist	Quarter-finalist
8 Mar	Tropical Championships; St. Augustine Lawn Tennis Club; St. Augustine, United States; Wood (i); Singles - Doubles	(United States) Henry Graff Trevor; 5 sets	(United States) C.E. Garrett		
8 Mar	Tropical Championships; St. Augustine Lawn Tennis Club; St. Augustine, United States; Wood (i); Singles - Doubles	Challenger (United States) Thomas Sterling Beckwith			
10 Mar	Bombay Gymkhana Club Tournament; Bombay Gymkhana Club; Bombay, India; Grass; Singles - Doubles	(United Kingdom) F. Ward; 2-6 6-5 6-3	(United Kingdom) T.C. Sangster	(United Kingdom) George McMahon (United Kingdom) Mr. Agnew Turner	

=== April ===
Ended	Tournament	Winner	Finalist	Semi-finalist	Quarter-finalist
17 Apr	British Covered Court Championships; London, Great Britain; Wood (i); Singles - Doubles	(United Kingdom) Ernest Wool Lewis; 6–3, 6–0, 6–1	(United Kingdom) Ernest Meers		

=== May ===
Ended	Tournament	Winner	Finalist	Semi-finalist	Quarter-finalist
1 May	New South Wales Championships; Sydney, Australia; Singles - Doubles	(Australia) Dudley Webb; 6–0, 6–4, 7–5	(Australia) Charles W. Cropper		
20 May.	Ceylon Championships; Nuwara Eliya Lawn Tennis Club; Nuwara Eliya, Ceylon; Clay; Singles – Doubles	(United Kingdom of Great Britain and Ireland) Charles Edward De Fonblanque; 6-4 6-5 4-6 4-6 6-4	(United Kingdom of Great Britain and Ireland) Edward George Farquharson	(United Kingdom of Great Britain and Ireland) L.E. Dalton (United Kingdom of Great Britain and Ireland) Thomas W. Gallwey	(United Kingdom of Great Britain and Ireland) James Parsons Dove (United Kingdom of Great Britain and Ireland) M. Findlay (United Kingdom of Great Britain and Ireland) Edgar Vanderspar
21 May	Irish Championships; Dublin, Ireland; Singles - Doubles	(United Kingdom) Ernest Renshaw; 6–4, 5–7, 6–4, 3–6, 6–2	(Ireland) Willoughby Hamilton		
26 May.	Fitzwilliam Club Championships; Fitzwilliam Lawn Tennis Club; Dublin, Ireland; Grass	(Ireland) Willoughby Hamilton; 6-4 6-3 6-1	(Ireland) Harold Mahony	(United Kingdom of Great Britain and Ireland) J.F. Hughes (United Kingdom of Great Britain and Ireland) J.T. Maxwell	(United Kingdom of Great Britain and Ireland) Ernest Henry Greene (United Kingdom of Great Britain and Ireland) (United Kingdom of Great Britain and Ireland) Charles Pierce Rowley James (Ireland) Edward Mahon (United Kingdom of Great Britain and Ireland) C. Roberts
26 May.	Fitzwilliam Club Championships; Fitzwilliam Lawn Tennis Club; Dublin, Ireland; Grass	Challenger (Ireland) Tom Campion		(United Kingdom of Great Britain and Ireland) J.F. Hughes (United Kingdom of Great Britain and Ireland) J.T. Maxwell	(United Kingdom of Great Britain and Ireland) Ernest Henry Greene (United Kingdom of Great Britain and Ireland) (United Kingdom of Great Britain and Ireland) Charles Pierce Rowley James (Ireland) Edward Mahon (United Kingdom of Great Britain and Ireland) C. Roberts
26 May	West of Scotland Championships; Pollockshields Athletic Club; Pollockshields; Scotland; Grass	(Scotland) J.B. Gray; 6–3, 8–6, 6–2	(Scotland) William Thomas Hendry	(Scotland) C. Gray (Scotland) Anderson Steel	(Scotland) Herbert Bowes-Lyon (Scotland) Richard Millar Watson (Scotland) Horatio R. Babington Peile (Wales) G.H. Aitken
26 May.	Western Counties Championship; Pollockshields Athletic Club; Pollockshields; Scotland; Grass; Singles - Doubles	(England) Arthur Nevile John Story; 6-2 2-6 6-3 8-6	(Scotland) Edward Barnard Fuller	(United Kingdom of Great Britain and Ireland) G. Scott-Jackson (Scotland) Richard Millar Watson	(United Kingdom of Great Britain and Ireland) John Adams (Scotland) James Cleland Burns (Scotland) R. Roxburgh (United Kingdom of Great Britain and Ireland) E.W. Wyatt

=== June ===
Ended	Tournament	Winner	Finalist	Semi-finalist	Quarter-finalist
4 Jun	Broughty Ferry Open; Broughty Ferry LTC; Broughty Ferry, Dundee, Angus, Scotland; Clay; Singles - Doubles	(Scotland) Alfred Aitken Thomson; 6-3 8-6 3-6 7-5	(England) Arthur Nevile John Story		
4 Jun	Middle States Championships; Hoboken, New Jersey, United States; Singles - Doubles	(United States) Edward Peale MacMullen; 6-0, 6–4, 0–6, 8-6	(United States) Robert Livingston Beeckman		
4 Jun	West of England Championships; Bath, Great Britain; Singles - Doubles	(United Kingdom) Harry S. Barlow; 6–4, 6–3, 8–10, 3–6, 8–6	(United Kingdom) James Baldwin		
9 Jun.	Whitehouse Open; Whitehouse Lawn Tennis Club; Edinburgh, Lothian, Scotland; Outdoor; Clay	(Scotland) Herbert Bowes-Lyon; 6-4, 6-3, 6-1	(Scotland) Edward Barnard Fuller	(Scotland) J.C. Huie (Scotland) Pat. Smith	(England) Stanley Riseley (United Kingdom of Great Britain and Ireland) J.C.S. Sandeman (Scotland) Kenneth Sanderson (Scotland) Richard Millar Watson
9 Jun.	Whitehouse Open; Whitehouse Lawn Tennis Club; Edinburgh, Lothian, Scotland; Outdoor; Clay	Challenge round (Scotland) Archibald Thomson		(Scotland) J.C. Huie (Scotland) Pat. Smith	(England) Stanley Riseley (United Kingdom of Great Britain and Ireland) J.C.S. Sandeman (Scotland) Kenneth Sanderson (Scotland) Richard Millar Watson
9 Jun.	Whitehouse Open; Whitehouse Lawn Tennis Club; Edinburgh, Lothian, Scotland; Outdoor; Clay	(Scotland) John Galbraith Horn (Scotland) Herbert Bowes-Lyon; 6-1, 0-6, 8-6, 6-4	(England) Arthur Nevile John Story (England) Arnold Wyersdale Blake	(Scotland) J.C. Huie (Scotland) Pat. Smith	(England) Stanley Riseley (United Kingdom of Great Britain and Ireland) J.C.S. Sandeman (Scotland) Kenneth Sanderson (Scotland) Richard Millar Watson
9 Jun.	Whitehouse Open; Whitehouse Lawn Tennis Club; Edinburgh, Lothian, Scotland; Outdoor; Clay	(Scotland) Richard Millar Watson (England) Ann Dod; 5-7, 6-3, 6-4	(Scotland) C.D. Murray (Scotland) Jane Ferguson	(Scotland) J.C. Huie (Scotland) Pat. Smith	(England) Stanley Riseley (United Kingdom of Great Britain and Ireland) J.C.S. Sandeman (Scotland) Kenneth Sanderson (Scotland) Richard Millar Watson
11 Jun	Welsh Championships; Penarth, Wales, Great Britain; Singles - Doubles	(Ireland) Willoughby Hamilton; 6–1, 6–1, 6–0	(Ireland) Ernest de Sylly Hamilton Browne		
11 Jun	Nottinghamshire Championships; Nottingham, Great Britain; Singles - Doubles	(United Kingdom) Frederick William Snook w.o.	(United Kingdom) Herbert Durrant Snook		
11 Jun	East Gloucestershire Championships; Cheltenham, Great Britain; Singles - Doubles	(United Kingdom) Harry S. Barlow; 7-5 6-3 4-6 2-6 ret.	(Ireland) Ernest de Sylly Hamilton Browne		
13 Jun	Southern Championships; Baltimore, Maryland, United States; Singles - Doubles	(United States) Alexander Hamilton Stump Post ?	(United States) Leigh Bonsal	(United States) Rodmond Vernon Beach (United States) William Austin Tomes	(United States) Charles L. McCauley (United States) Yates Pennington (United States) Oscar R. Woodward
13 Jun	Southern Championships; Baltimore, Maryland, United States; Singles - Doubles	(United States) Leigh Bonsal (United States) L.V. Lemoyne		(United States) Rodmond Vernon Beach (United States) William Austin Tomes	(United States) Charles L. McCauley (United States) Yates Pennington (United States) Oscar R. Woodward
17 Jun	Macclesfield Open Lawn Tennis Tournament; Macclesfield LTC; Macclesfield, Cheshire, England; Outdoor; Grass; Singles	(United Kingdom) Henry Guy Nadin w.o.	(United Kingdom) G.E. Lowe	(United Kingdom) John Barlow Thistlethwaite (United Kingdom) G.H. Willoughby	(United Kingdom) W. Burgess (United Kingdom) H.R. Greaves (United Kingdom) J.A. Rooke (United Kingdom) W. Twyford
18 Jun	London Championships; London, Great Britain; Singles - Doubles	(United Kingdom) Ernest Wool Lewis; 6-0 6-1 6-2	(United Kingdom) Harry S. Barlow		
18 Jun	Kent Championships; Beckenham, Great Britain; Singles - Doubles	(United Kingdom) Ernest Meers; 5–7, 3–6, 9–7, 6–3, 6–2	(United Kingdom) Frederick A. Bowlby		
18 Jun	Northern Championships; Manchester, Great Britain; Singles - Doubles	(Ireland) Willoughby Hamilton; 6-1 8-6 6-1	(United Kingdom of Great Britain and Ireland) Harry Grove		
21 Jun.	Northumberland Cricket Club Open; Heaton, Newcastle upon Tyne, England; Grass; Singles – Doubles	(United Kingdom of Great Britain and Ireland) Kenneth R. Marley; 6-1 6-2 6-2	(United Kingdom of Great Britain and Ireland) Harold Gurney Pease	(United Kingdom of Great Britain and Ireland) George Bloomfield Garvey (United Kingdom of Great Britain and Ireland) Harold King	(United Kingdom of Great Britain and Ireland) W. Armstrong (United Kingdom of Great Britain and Ireland) Arthur Wellesley Hallward (United Kingdom of Great Britain and Ireland) A. Jackson (United Kingdom of Great Britain and Ireland) Wilson Pease
22 Jun.	New England Championships; New Haven LTC; New Haven, Connecticut United States; Singles – Doubles	(United States) Henry Slocum; 8-6 5-7 6-4 4-6 6-2	(United States) Oliver Samuel Campbell	(United States) Francis Gibbons (Frank) Beach (United States) William Larned Thacher	(United States) C.H. Ludington jr6 (United States) John W. Nichols Jr (United States) C.W. Pierson (United States) Albert Empie Wright
22 Jun.	New England Championships; New Haven LTC; New Haven, Connecticut United States; Singles – Doubles	Challenger (United States) Edward Peale MacMullen		(United States) Francis Gibbons (Frank) Beach (United States) William Larned Thacher	(United States) C.H. Ludington jr6 (United States) John W. Nichols Jr (United States) C.W. Pierson (United States) Albert Empie Wright
25 Jun.	Waterloo Tournament; Waterloo Lawn Tennis Club; Liverpool, Great Britain; Grass; Singles – Doubles	(United Kingdom of Great Britain and Ireland) Jacob Gaitskell Brown w.o.	(United Kingdom of Great Britain and Ireland) Herbert Chipp	(United Kingdom of Great Britain and Ireland) William Parkfield Wethered (United Kingdom of Great Britain and Ireland) Ernest Joseph Soares	(United Kingdom of Great Britain and Ireland) P.G. Hall (United Kingdom of Great Britain and Ireland) Andrew Laurie Macfie (United Kingdom of Great Britain and Ireland) G. Smith (United Kingdom of Great Britain and Ireland) Beresford St. George Verschoyle
30 Jun	Edgbaston Open Tournament; Edgbaston Cricket and Lawn Tennis Club; Edgbaston, Warwickshire, England; Grass; Singles - Doubles	(United Kingdom) James Baldwin; 7-9 6-0 6-2 6-4	(United Kingdom) Charles Hoadley Ashe Ross	(United Kingdom) G.E. Lowe (United Kingdom) Frank Noon	(United Kingdom) George Ernest Dixon Brown (United Kingdom) Marmaduke Strickland Constable (United Kingdom) John Redfern Deykin (United Kingdom) Noel Maitland Farrer
30 Jun	Edgbaston Open Tournament; Edgbaston Cricket and Lawn Tennis Club; Edgbaston, Warwickshire, England; Grass; Singles - Doubles	(United Kingdom) John Redfern Deykin (England) Maud Watson; 0-6 7-5 6-2	(United Kingdom) George Brown (United Kingdom) Bertha Steedman	(United Kingdom) G.E. Lowe (United Kingdom) Frank Noon	(United Kingdom) George Ernest Dixon Brown (United Kingdom) Marmaduke Strickland Constable (United Kingdom) John Redfern Deykin (United Kingdom) Noel Maitland Farrer
30 Jun.	Midland Counties Championships; Edgbaston Cricket & Lawn Tennis Club; Edgbaston, England; Grass; Singles – Doubles	(United Kingdom of Great Britain and Ireland) Harry Scrivener; 6-2 6-0 9-7	(United Kingdom of Great Britain and Ireland) Henry Guy Nadin	(United Kingdom of Great Britain and Ireland) Francis Russell Burrow (United Kingdom of Great Britain and Ireland) G.E. Lowe	(United Kingdom of Great Britain and Ireland) George Reston Brewerton (United Kingdom of Great Britain and Ireland) W.R. Craig (United Kingdom of Great Britain and Ireland) Percival Du Sautoy Leather (United Kingdom of Great Britain and Ireland) Herbert Haden Monckton
30 Jun.	Midland Counties Championships; Edgbaston Cricket & Lawn Tennis Club; Edgbaston, England; Grass; Singles – Doubles	Challenger (United Kingdom of Great Britain and Ireland) John Redfern Deykin		(United Kingdom of Great Britain and Ireland) Francis Russell Burrow (United Kingdom of Great Britain and Ireland) G.E. Lowe	(United Kingdom of Great Britain and Ireland) George Reston Brewerton (United Kingdom of Great Britain and Ireland) W.R. Craig (United Kingdom of Great Britain and Ireland) Percival Du Sautoy Leather (United Kingdom of Great Britain and Ireland) Herbert Haden Monckton

=== July ===
Ended	Tournament	Winner	Finalist	Semi-finalist	Quarter-finalist
2 Jul	Natal Championships; Brea Lawn Tennis Ground; Durban, South Africa; Singles - Doubles	(South Africa) William J. Grant; 6-2 6-3 6-1	(South Africa) A. Butcher	(South Africa) Samuel Francis Beningfield (South Africa) Mr. Weise	(South Africa) W.E. Butcher (South Africa) Mr. Collinson (South Africa) Mr. Short
2 Jul	Natal Championships; Brea Lawn Tennis Ground; Durban, South Africa; Singles - Doubles	Challenger (South Africa) Reuben Widdows Beningfield		(South Africa) Samuel Francis Beningfield (South Africa) Mr. Weise	(South Africa) W.E. Butcher (South Africa) Mr. Collinson (South Africa) Mr. Short
2 Jul	Houndiscombe Tennis Tournament; Houndiscombe, Plymouth, Devon, Great Britain; Grass; Singles - Doubles	(England) Wilfred Milne; 6-1 6-0	(England) C.R. Broad		
2 Jul	Norton Lawn Tennis Open Tournament; Norton, Stockton-on-Tees, County Durham, Great Britain; Clay; Singles - Doubles	(England) H.C. King; 6-2 4-6 10-8 7-5	(England) Frederick T. Bradbury		
2 Jul.	County Dublin Championships; Lansdowne Lawn Tennis Club; Dublin, Ireland; Grass; Singles – Doubles	(Ireland) Joshua Pim; 6-3 6-4 9-7	(Ireland) William Drumond Hamilton	(United Kingdom of Great Britain and Ireland) Thomas Harrison Griffiths (United Kingdom of Great Britain and Ireland) Frank Stoker	(United Kingdom of Great Britain and Ireland) C.P. Brett (Ireland) Manliffe Goodbody (United Kingdom of Great Britain and Ireland) J. Godley (Ireland) William Henry Mahon
2 Jul.	Somersetshire Championships; Taunton, Somerset, England; Grass; Singles – Doubles	(United Kingdom of Great Britain and Ireland) James Baldwin; 1-6 7-5 6-3	(United Kingdom of Great Britain and Ireland) Ernest Legassicke Hancock *	(United Kingdom of Great Britain and Ireland) H.F. Wilkinson	
2 Jul	Northern Counties Challenge Cup; Norton, County Durham, Great Britain; Grass; Singles - Doubles	(United Kingdom of Great Britain and Ireland) E.W. Fletcher; 6-2 6-3 6-0	(United Kingdom of Great Britain and Ireland) Henry Bolckow *	(United Kingdom of Great Britain and Ireland) Arthur Burgess Crosby	(United Kingdom of Great Britain and Ireland) Frederick T. Bradbury (United Kingdom of Great Britain and Ireland) George E. Newby (United Kingdom of Great Britain and Ireland) Harold Gurney Pease
4 Jul.	Englewood Open; Field Club; Englewood, New Jersey, United States; Clay; Singles – Doubles	(United States) Oliver Campbell; 6–2 1–6 5–7 6–4 6–4	(United States) Albert Empie Wright	(United States) Grant Notman (United States) William Austin Tomes	(United States) Theodore M. Banks (United States) Clarence Hobart (United States) F.A. Kellogg (United States) Richard W. Stevens
7 July.	Staffordshire Lawn Tennis Tournament; Stafford Institute LTC; Stafford, Great Britain; Grass; Singles	(United Kingdom) Ernest Wool Lewis; 6-0 6-1 6-0	(Scotland) Francis Russell Burrow	(United Kingdom) G.E. Lowe (United Kingdom) Frederick Anthony Watts	(Ireland) Tom Campion (United Kingdom) John Redfern Deykin (United Kingdom) Alfred Edward Thompson (United Kingdom) Walter Mace Shipman
7 Jul	Cambridgeshire Lawn Tennis Tournament; Cambridge, Great Britain; Singles – Doubles	(United Kingdom) Charles Hoadley Ashe Ross; 0-6 8-6 7-5 6-4	(United Kingdom) Alfred E. Walker	(United Kingdom) Percy Bateman Brown (United Kingdom) Herbert Ramon Yglesias	(United Kingdom) F.H. Aves (United Kingdom) Horace Corthorn Elgood (United Kingdom) L.C.P. Wolferston (United Kingdom) F.R. Wilcox
7 Jul	Wimbledon Championships; London, Great Britain; Singles - Doubles	(United Kingdom) Ernest Renshaw; 6–3, 7–5, 6–0	(Scotland) Herbert Lawford		
7 Jul	Wimbledon Championships; London, Great Britain; Singles - Doubles	(United Kingdom) Ernest Renshaw (United Kingdom) William Renshaw, 2–6, 1–6, 6–3, 6–4, 6–3	(Scotland) Patrick Bowes-Lyon (United Kingdom) Herbert Wilberforce		
8 Jul.	Staten Island Invitation; Staten Island Cricket & Baseball Club; Livingston, Staten Island, New York City, United States; Grass; Singles - Doubles	(United States) Henry Slocum; 6-4 6-8 6-1 9-7	(United States) Edward Peale MacMullen	(United States) Samuel A. Campbell Jr. (United States) Valentine Gill Hall	(United States) James Brown (United States) P.E. Johnson (United States) Quincy Shaw (United States) Howard Augustus Taylor
8 Jul	Western Championships; Scarlett Ribbon Club; Chicago, United States; Singles - Doubles	(United States) Charles Amherst Chase; 6-3 6-3 6-1	(United States) Samuel Thompson Chase	(United States) J.W. Carver	(United States) T.L. McClung (United States) E.A. Valentine
8 Jul	Western Championships; Scarlett Ribbon Club; Chicago, United States; Singles - Doubles	Challenger (United States) E.W. McClellan		(United States) J.W. Carver	(United States) T.L. McClung (United States) E.A. Valentine
14 Jul	Champion Hill Tournament; East Dulwich, Great Britain; Grass; Singles - Doubles	(England) Wilberforce Eaves; 6-4 6-4	(England) G.A. Adair		
16 Jul.	Warwickshire Championships; Leamington Spa, Great Britain; Grass; Singles – Doubles	(United Kingdom of Great Britain and Ireland) Charles Hoadley Ashe Ross; 6-3 1-6 6-3 6-0	(United Kingdom of Great Britain and Ireland) John Redfern Deykin	(United Kingdom of Great Britain and Ireland) Francis Russell Burrow (United Kingdom of Great Britain and Ireland) G.S. Back	(Ireland) William Drumond Hamilton (United Kingdom of Great Britain and Ireland) G.B. Hodson (United Kingdom of Great Britain and Ireland) J.H. Mitchell (United Kingdom of Great Britain and Ireland) Hampden Wilkieson
23 Jul	Ilkley Closed Tournament; Ilkley, Great Britain; Grass; Singles - Doubles	(England) Arthur Godfrey Pease; 5-7 6-1 6-4 6-4	(England) E.W. Fletcher		
23 Jul	Yorkshire Association and County Open Tournament (later Yorkshire Championships); Ilkley, Great Britain; Grass; Singles - Doubles	(Ireland) William Drummond Hamilton; 6-3 6-2 6-2	(England) E.W. Fletcher	(United Kingdom) George Dixon Brown (England) Arthur Godfrey Pease	(United Kingdom) Percy Bateman Brown (United Kingdom) Harold Weston Carlton (England) Walter Mace Shipman (Scotland) Archibald Thomson
23 Jul	Middlesex Championships; Chiswick Park, Great Britain; Singles - Doubles	(United Kingdom) Ernest Wool Lewis; 6-2 6-2 6-2	(United Kingdom) Ernest George Meers		
23 Jul.	Rockaway Hunting Club Invitation; Rockaway Hunting Club; Lawrence, Nassau County, New York, United States; Grass; Singles - Doubles	(United States) Henry Slocum; 6-3, 6-2, 6-1	(United States) Howard Augustus Taylor	(United States) Grant Notman	(United States) Carroll J. Post Jr. (United States) Morton Spring Paton (United States) Charles Edward Sands
24 July.	Southampton Invitation; Meadow Club; Southampton, New York, US; Surface ? Singles – Doubles	(United States) Howard Augustus Taylor; 6-8 6-1 1-6 6-3 6-3	(United States) Henry Warner Slocum Jr.	(United States) Oliver Samuel Campbell (United States) Foxhall Parker Keene	(United States) F.M. Bacon (United States) J.F. Bacon (United States) D. Folsom (United States) William Austin Tomes
24 July.	Southampton Invitation; Meadow Club; Southampton, New York, US; Surface ? Singles – Doubles	Challenger (United States) Joseph Sill Clark		(United States) Oliver Samuel Campbell (United States) Foxhall Parker Keene	(United States) F.M. Bacon (United States) J.F. Bacon (United States) D. Folsom (United States) William Austin Tomes
27 Jul	Northumberland Championships; Constabulary Cricket Ground; Newcastle upon Tyne, Great Britain; Singles - Doubles	(Scotland) Patrick Bowes-Lyon; 6-0 6-0 6-0	(United Kingdom) Percival Charles Du Sautoy Leather		
30 Jul.	Ilkley Open Tournament; Ilkley LTC; Ilkley, Yorkshire, England; Grass	(Ireland) William Drumond Hamilton; 6-3 6-2 6-2	(United Kingdom of Great Britain and Ireland) James Baldwin	(United Kingdom of Great Britain and Ireland) George Ernest Dixon Brown (United Kingdom of Great Britain and Ireland) Arthur Godfrey Pease	(United Kingdom of Great Britain and Ireland) Percy Bateman Brown (United Kingdom of Great Britain and Ireland) Harold Weston Carlton (United Kingdom of Great Britain and Ireland) Walter Mace Shipman (Scotland) Archibald Thomson
30 Jul.	Ilkley Open Tournament; Ilkley LTC; Ilkley, Yorkshire, England; Grass	Challenger (United Kingdom of Great Britain and Ireland) E.W. Fletcher		(United Kingdom of Great Britain and Ireland) George Ernest Dixon Brown (United Kingdom of Great Britain and Ireland) Arthur Godfrey Pease	(United Kingdom of Great Britain and Ireland) Percy Bateman Brown (United Kingdom of Great Britain and Ireland) Harold Weston Carlton (United Kingdom of Great Britain and Ireland) Walter Mace Shipman (Scotland) Archibald Thomson

=== August ===
Ended	Tournament	Winner	Finalist	Semi-finalist	Quarter-finalist
1 Aug	Gore Court Championships; Sittingbourne, Great Britain; Clay; Singles - Doubles	(England) Wilberforce Vaughan Eaves; 5-6 6-3 6-5	(United Kingdom of Great Britain and Ireland) D. Fuller		
1 Aug.	Derbyshire Championships; Buxton LTC; Buxton, Great Britain; Grass; Singles – Doubles	(Ireland) Tom Campion; 7-5 6-4 7-5	(United Kingdom of Great Britain and Ireland) Percy Bateman Brown	(United Kingdom of Great Britain and Ireland) T.G. Hill (Scotland) Archibald Thomson	(United Kingdom of Great Britain and Ireland) Frederick T. Bradbury (United Kingdom of Great Britain and Ireland) Harold Weston Carlton (Ireland) William Drumond Hamilton (United Kingdom of Great Britain and Ireland) George Hillyard
2 Aug	U.S. National Championships; Newport, United States; Singles - Doubles	(United States) Henry Slocum; 6-4 6-1 6-0	(United States) Howard Augustus Taylor		
2 Aug	U.S. National Championships; Newport, United States; Singles - Doubles	(United States) Oliver Campbell (United States) Valentine Hall; 6-4 6-2 6-2	(United States) Clarence Hobart (United States) Edward MacMullen		
4 Aug.	Wentworth Open Tournament; Hotel Wentworth; New Castle, New Hampshire, United States; Grass; Singles - Doubles	(United States) Charles Amherst Chase; 6-4, 7-5, 4-6, 4-6, 6-3	(United States) Oliver Samuel Campbell	(United States) Frederick Sherwood Mansfield (United States) Edward Peale MacMullen	(United States) Francis L. V. Hoppin (United States) Quincy Shaw (United States) Hugh A. Tallant (United States) Albert Empie Wright
4 Aug.	North Wales Challenge Cup; Vale of Clwyd LTC; Denbigh, Vale of Clwyd, Wales; Outdoor; Grass; Singles	(England) George Whitely Hayes; 6-4, 6-3, 6-2	(England) W.H. Hayes	(United Kingdom of Great Britain and Ireland) J. Halford (United Kingdom of Great Britain and Ireland) P. Ormrod	(United Kingdom of Great Britain and Ireland) G.D. Heaton (Wales) R. Lloyd Williams
4 Aug.	North Wales Challenge Cup; Vale of Clwyd LTC; Denbigh, Vale of Clwyd, Wales; Outdoor; Grass; Singles	Challenger (England) Henry James Wilson Fosbery		(United Kingdom of Great Britain and Ireland) J. Halford (United Kingdom of Great Britain and Ireland) P. Ormrod	(United Kingdom of Great Britain and Ireland) G.D. Heaton (Wales) R. Lloyd Williams
4 Aug.	Westchester Lawn Tennis Club (Invitation) (Waterbury Challenge Cup); Westchester Country Club; Harrison, New York, USA; Grass; Singles - Doubles	(United States) Oliver Samuel Campbell; 6-8, 6-3, 6-4, 5-7, 6-3	(United States) Robert Livingston Beeckman	(United States) Howard Augustus Taylor (United States) Charles Edward Sands	
6 Aug.	Rochester Open; Paddock Lawn Tennis Club; Rochester, Kent, England; Grass; Singles	(United Kingdom of Great Britain and Ireland) Charles Gladstone Eames; 6-3 6-4	(United Kingdom of Great Britain and Ireland) Wilfred Baddeley	(United Kingdom of Great Britain and Ireland) Charles Percy Oliver Chipp (United Kingdom of Great Britain and Ireland) R.J. Cracknell	(United Kingdom of Great Britain and Ireland) Oscar William Benwell (Australia) Arthur Benjamin Carvosso (United Kingdom of Great Britain and Ireland) A.B. Green (United Kingdom of Great Britain and Ireland) David Elgar Payn
11 Aug.	West of Ireland Championships; County Sligo Lawn Tennis Club; Ardaghowen, Sligo, Ireland; Grass; Singles - Doubles	(Ireland) Willoughby Hamilton; 4-6, 6-2, 6-3, 5-7, 6-2	(Ireland) Blaney Hamilton	(Ireland) Effingham Carroll McDowell (United Kingdom of Great Britain and Ireland) Cecil John Cramer-Roberts	(Ireland) George Hewson (United Kingdom of Great Britain and Ireland) Chaloner Knox (United Kingdom of Great Britain and Ireland) George Stepney (United Kingdom of Great Britain and Ireland) Charles Edward Wylam
11 Aug.	West of Ireland Championships; County Sligo Lawn Tennis Club; Ardaghowen, Sligo, Ireland; Grass; Singles - Doubles	Challenger (Ireland) Arthur John de Courcy Wilson		(Ireland) Effingham Carroll McDowell (United Kingdom of Great Britain and Ireland) Cecil John Cramer-Roberts	(Ireland) George Hewson (United Kingdom of Great Britain and Ireland) Chaloner Knox (United Kingdom of Great Britain and Ireland) George Stepney (United Kingdom of Great Britain and Ireland) Charles Edward Wylam
11 Aug.	Exmouth Tournament; Exmouth Lawn Tennis Club; Exmouth, England; Singles – Doubles	(United Kingdom) Ernest Wool Lewis; 6-1 6-3 6-3	(United Kingdom of Great Britain and Ireland) Herbert Chipp	(United Kingdom) Harry Grove (United Kingdom of Great Britain and Ireland) George Hillyard	(United Kingdom of Great Britain and Ireland) Arnold Wyersdale Blake (United Kingdom of Great Britain and Ireland) John Redfern Deykin (United Kingdom of Great Britain and Ireland) Conway John Morgan (United Kingdom of Great Britain and Ireland) Frank Noon
11 Aug.	Waterford Annual Lawn Tennis Tournament; Rocklands, Waterford, Ireland; Grass; Singles - Doubles	(Ireland) William Drumond Hamilton; 4-6, 6-4, 6-1, 6-3	(United Kingdom of Great Britain and Ireland) E. Bourke	(Ireland) John M. Brown (Ireland) G. Butler	(Ireland) Henry Joseph Gallwey (Ireland) Raymond De La Poer (Ireland) W.J. Richardson (United Kingdom of Great Britain and Ireland) Captain H.T. Ravenhill
11 Aug.	Waterford Annual Lawn Tennis Tournament; Rocklands, Waterford, Ireland; Grass; Singles - Doubles	Challenger (Ireland) Manliffe Francis Goodbody		(Ireland) John M. Brown (Ireland) G. Butler	(Ireland) Henry Joseph Gallwey (Ireland) Raymond De La Poer (Ireland) W.J. Richardson (United Kingdom of Great Britain and Ireland) Captain H.T. Ravenhill
11 Aug	Northwestern Championships; Minneapolis, United States; Singles - Doubles	(United States) R.D. Applegate; 6-4, 6-5	(United States) H. Cramer		
11 Aug	Scottish Championships; St Andrews, Great Britain; Singles - Doubles	(Scotland) Patrick Bowes-Lyon; 1–6, 0–6, 10–8, 6–2, 3–1 ret.	(United Kingdom) Harry Grove		
18 Aug.	Tenby Open; Tenby LTC; Tenby, Pembrokeshire, Wales; Outdoor; Grass; Singles - Doubles	(Wales) William Sidney Nelson Heard; 6-2 6-2 6-1	(United Kingdom of Great Britain and Ireland) E.W. David	(United Kingdom of Great Britain and Ireland) W.R. Glazebrook (United Kingdom of Great Britain and Ireland) A.M.C. Smith	(Wales) Colonel Thomas Powell Lewes (United Kingdom of Great Britain and Ireland) A.G. Norris (United Kingdom of Great Britain and Ireland) E.M. Samson (United Kingdom of Great Britain and Ireland) A. Stabb
18 Aug.	Teignmouth and Shaldon Open; Teignmouth LTC; Teignmouth, Devon, England; Grass; Singles	(United Kingdom of Great Britain and Ireland) Herbert Chipp; 6-0 6-1 6-0	(United Kingdom of Great Britain and Ireland) John Redfern Deykin	(United Kingdom of Great Britain and Ireland) Edward Charles Pine-Coffin (United Kingdom of Great Britain and Ireland) Robert Charles Thompson	(United Kingdom of Great Britain and Ireland) Wilfred Milne (United Kingdom of Great Britain and Ireland) Conway John Morgan (United Kingdom of Great Britain and Ireland) Frank Noon (United Kingdom of Great Britain and Ireland) L. Peel Yates
21 Aug.	Whitby Open Lawn Tennis Tournament; West Cliff Tennis Grounds; Whitby, North Yorkshire, England; Outdoor; Grass; Singles - Doubles	(United Kingdom of Great Britain and Ireland) Herbert Wilberforce; 6-4, 6-4, 8-6	(Scotland) Herbert Bowes-Lyon	(United Kingdom of Great Britain and Ireland) Arthur Wellesley Hallward (England) William Edwin Pease	(United Kingdom of Great Britain and Ireland) E.W. Fletcher (United Kingdom of Great Britain and Ireland) George Richmond Mewburn (England) Arthur Godfrey Pease (United Kingdom of Great Britain and Ireland) Arthur John Stanley
21 Aug.	South of Scotland Championships; Moffat; Scotland; Grass	(Scotland) Alfred Aitken Thomson; 6-1 6-3 4-6 6-4	(Scotland) J. Scott	(United Kingdom of Great Britain and Ireland) Francis Pinhorn (Scotland) G. Scott	(United Kingdom of Great Britain and Ireland) Stuart Leslie Bathurst (United Kingdom of Great Britain and Ireland) Guy Hannaford (Scotland) Bargeny McCulloch
21 Aug	Torquay Lawn Tennis Tournmament; Torquay, Great Britain; Singles - Doubles	(United Kingdom) Ernest Wool Lewis; 3-6 0-6 6-1 6-4 6-0	(United Kingdom) Herbert Chipp	(United Kingdom) J. Cassavetti (United Kingdom) George Hillyard	
23 Aug.	Saxmundham Lawn Tennis Tournament; Saxmundham Lawn Tennis Club; Hurts Hall Park, Saxmundham, England; Grass; Saxmundham Lawn Tennis Tournament – Doubles	(United Kingdom of Great Britain and Ireland) George Kensit Barnabas Norman; 3–6, 6–4, 6–2	(United Kingdom of Great Britain and Ireland) A. Hewetson	(United Kingdom of Great Britain and Ireland) Arthur Bacon Longe (United Kingdom of Great Britain and Ireland) C.R. Rodwell	(United Kingdom) Charles Sidney Cullingham (United Kingdom) F.E. Hollond (United Kingdom) William Bolding Monement (United Kingdom) Edward Berners Upcher
23 Aug	Seabright Invitational Tournament; Seabright Lawn Tennis and Cricket Club; Rumson, New Jersey, United States; Singles - Doubles	(United States) H. Alexander; 6-2 6-4	(United States) W. Ward		
27 Aug	North of England Championships; Scarborough, Great Britain; Singles - Doubles	(United Kingdom of Great Britain and Ireland) Ernest de Sylly Hamilton Browne; 6-1 6-1 6-1	(United Kingdom) Henry Guy Nadin		

=== September ===
Ended	Tournament	Winner	Finalist	Semi-finalist	Quarter-finalist
3 Sep.	Sheffield and Hallamshire Tournament; Sheffield and Hallamshire LTC; Sheffield, Yorkshire, Great Britain; Grass; Singles – Doubles	(United Kingdom of Great Britain and Ireland) G.E. Lowe; 6-2 6-1 2-6 6-0	(United Kingdom of Great Britain and Ireland) Henry Guy Nadin	(United Kingdom of Great Britain and Ireland) Frederick T. Bradbury (United Kingdom of Great Britain and Ireland) Walter Shipman	(United Kingdom of Great Britain and Ireland) E.W. Brooke (United Kingdom of Great Britain and Ireland) David Davy (United Kingdom of Great Britain and Ireland) G.F. Padley (United Kingdom of Great Britain and Ireland) W.F. Rodgers
3 Sep.	South of England Championships; Eastbourne, Great Britain; Grass; Singles - Doubles	(United Kingdom) Andrew George Ziffo; 4–6, 6–2, 7–5, 6–3	(United Kingdom) Harry S. Barlow		
3 Sep.	Southern California Championships; Santa Monica, United States; Hard; Singles - Doubles	(United States) Robert Peyton Carter w.o.	(United States) William Henry Young		
10 Sep.	Boulogne International; Tennis Club Boulogne-sur-Mer; Boulogne-sur-Mer, France; Clay; Singles – Doubles	(United Kingdom of Great Britain and Ireland) Edgar Chippendale; 6-2 6-1 6-2	(United Kingdom of Great Britain and Ireland) Lewin Alexander	(United Kingdom of Great Britain and Ireland) W. Egerton (United Kingdom of Great Britain and Ireland) H.J. Gibson	
10 Sep.	Boulogne International; Tennis Club Boulogne-sur-Mer; Boulogne-sur-Mer, France; Clay; Singles – Doubles	Challenger (United Kingdom of Great Britain and Ireland) William C. Taylor		(United Kingdom of Great Britain and Ireland) W. Egerton (United Kingdom of Great Britain and Ireland) H.J. Gibson	
15 Sep	Queensland Championships; Toowong Sports Ground; Brisbane, Australia; Grass; Singles - Doubles	(Australia) Arthur F. Taylor; 12-4	(Australia) Harold De Winton	(Australia) Dudley Pontifex	(Australia) Ernest John Gilligan (Australia) Charles Pennell
24 Sep.	Rochester Lawn Tennis Tournament; Rochester Lawn Tennis Club; Rochester, New York, US; Grass; Singles – Doubles	(United States) Charles Amherst Chase; 6-2 6-0 6-2	(United States) Godfrey Malbone Brinley	(United States) Philip Sears (United States) Valentine Hall	(United States) Robert Livingston Beeckman (United States) Joseph Sill Clark Sr. (United States) Albert Hamlin (United States) Adam Empie Wright Jr.

=== October ===
Ended	Tournament	Winner	Finalist	Semi-finalist	Quarter-finalist
14.Oct	Intercollegiate Championships; New Haven, United States; Grass; Singles - Doubles	(United States) Philip Sears; 7-5 4-6 6-2 4-6 6-2	(United States) Valentine Gill Hall		
25 Oct	Victorian Championships; Melbourne, Cricket Club Grounds; Melbourne, Australia; Asphalt; Singles - Doubles	(Australia) Arthur Colquhoun; 6-3 6-4 6-3	(United Kingdom) John Hartley		
25 Oct	Southern Fall Championships; Highland Country Club; Washington D.C., United States; Singles - Doubles	(United States) Fred Mansfield; 6-1 6-4 6-2	(United States) Deane B. Miller	(United States) Francis L. V. Hoppin (United States) J.W. Smith	(United States) Rodmond Vernon Beach (United States) C.H. Ludington jr (United States) Arthur Landon Rives

=== November ===
No events

=== December ===
Week	Tournament	Winner	Finalist	Semi-finalist	Quarter-finalist
24 Dec	New Zealand Championships; Napier, New Zealand; Singles - Doubles	(New Zealand) Percival Clennell Fenwick; 4-6 4-6 6-1 6-4 9-7	(New Zealand) Minden Fenwick	(New Zealand) Edward Robert Boddington (New Zealand) Richard Dacre Harman	(New Zealand) Charles Edward Stuart Gillies (New Zealand) Charles Dugald Kennedy (New Zealand) Thomas Harold Rawson (New Zealand) Frederick Wilding
24 Dec	New Zealand Championships; Napier, New Zealand; Singles - Doubles	(New Zealand) Miss E. Gordon (New Zealand) Frederick Wilding; 6-1 6-3	(New Zealand) Miss Hilda Hitchings (New Zealand) C. D. Kennedy	(New Zealand) Edward Robert Boddington (New Zealand) Richard Dacre Harman	(New Zealand) Charles Edward Stuart Gillies (New Zealand) Charles Dugald Kennedy (New Zealand) Thomas Harold Rawson (New Zealand) Frederick Wilding

== Sources ==
- A. Wallis Myers, ed. (1903). Lawn Tennis at Home and Abroad (1st ed.). New York: Charles Scribner's Sons. OCLC 5358651.
- Baily's Monthly Magazine of Sports and Pastimes, and Racing Register, A.H. Baily & Company of Cornhill. London. England. July 1887.
- Collins. Bud, Total Tennis:The Ultimate Tennis Encyclopedia Sport Classic Books, Toronto, Canada, ISBN 0-9731443-4-3
- Gillmeister, Heiner (1998). Tennis:Cultural History. London: A&C Black. ISBN 9780718501952.
- Hall, Valentine Gill (1889). Lawn tennis in America. Biographical sketches of all the prominent players, knotty points, and all the latest rules and directions governing handicaps, umpires, and rules for playing. D. W. Granbery & Co. New York, NY, USA:
- Lake, Robert J. (2014). A Social History of Tennis in Britain: Volume 5 of Routledge Research in Sports History. Routledge:. ISBN 9781134445578.
- Mazak, Karoly (2017). The Concise History of Tennis. Independently published. ISBN 9781549746475.
- Nauright, John; Parrish, Charles (2012). Sports Around the World: History, Culture, and Practice. Santa Barbara, Calif.: ABC-CLIO. ISBN 9781598843002.
- Nieuwland, Alex (2009–2021). "Tournaments – Search for Tournament – Year – 1888". www.tennisarchives.com. Harlingen, Netherlands.
- Paret, Jahial Parmly; Allen, J. P.; Alexander, Frederick B.; Hardy, Samuel [from old catalogue (1918). Spalding's tennis annual . New York, NY, USA: New York, American sports publishing company.
- The Australian Dictionary of Biography (1966–2021). Including a supplementary volume of ‘missing persons’ have, so far, been published. Volumes 1–19. The National Centre of Biography. Australian National University. Canberra. Australia.
- The John Player Nottingham Tennis Tournament: Record of Winners Nottingham Lawn Tennis Tournament (1887–1970) (PDF). Nottingham Castle LTC. Notts Lawn Tennis Association. 7 June 1971. pp. 1–7.
