= Tom Chaytor =

Irish tennis player (1870–1951)

- Full name: Thomas Chaytor
- Country (sports): Ireland
- Born: 13 November 1870 Killiney, County Dublin, Ireland
- Died: 30 January 1951 (aged 81) Rathdown, County Dublin, Ireland
- Turned pro: 1890 (amateur tour)
- Retired: 1895

Singles
- Career record: 105/74 (70.4%)
- Career titles: 7

Grand Slam singles results
- Wimbledon: SF (1894)

Doubles

Grand Slam doubles results
- Wimbledon: QF (1894)

Thomas Chaytor (13 November 1870 – 30 January 1951) was an Irish tennis player. He was an Irish Lawn Tennis Championships finalist in 1894 losing to Joshua Pim. He was a semi finalist at the 1894 Wimbledon Championships in the men's singles event and a quarter finalist in the men's doubles event. He won seven career titles out of fifteen finals.

== Career ==
Tom Chaytor was born on 13 November 1870 in Killiney, County Dublin in Ireland. He was one of three of his brothers who also played tennis, including the 1890 Wimbledon quarter finalist Grainger Chaytor. He played his first tournament at the 1890 County Dublin Championships at the Lansdowne Lawn Tennis Club where he reached the semi-finals losing to Thomas Harrison Griffiths in 3 sets.

In May 1891 he won his first title the Dublin University Championships held at Trinity College, Dublin beating Arthur Henry Gore Ashe in 3 sets. In July 1892 he won the Northumberland Championships at Newcastle-upon-Tyne, England beating fellow Irish player Harold Mahony in 3 sets. At the end of July 1892 he reached the finals of the Midland Counties Championships held at Edgbaston Cricket and Lawn Tennis Club where he lost in 3 sets to, two time Wimbledon finalist Harry Barlow. In August 1892 he won the Exmouth Open tournament at Exmouth, England defeating Harold Walters in 3 sets.

In May 1893 he won the first of three titles at the Fitzwilliam Club Championships held at the Fitzwilliam Lawn Tennis Club, Dublin, Ireland defeating Alexander Porter in four sets. In July 1893 he won the Warwickshire Championships held at Lemington Spa beating Percy Bateman Brown in 4 sets.

In March 1894, Chaytor reached the final of the Irish Championships, where he faced defending champion and Wimbledon champion Joshua Pim Chaytor hit great passing shots and his backhand was winning him a lot of points. Pim won, by the score of 9–7 in the fifth set. In May 1894 he won his second Fitzwilliam Club Championships defeating George Greene in the challenge round.

At the 1894 Wimbledon Championships in July that year where Tom played only once, he beat Horace Chapman, Clement Cazalet and Ernest George Meers, before handing a walkover to Wilfred Baddeley in the semi-finals (he couldn't play because of badly blistered feet). In May 1895 he won the Fitzwilliam Club Championships for the third time beating Walter Herbert Boyd in 3 sets. He won seven career titles overall.
