= Gore Court =

Sports ground in Sittingbourne, Kent, England

The Grove, Gore Court
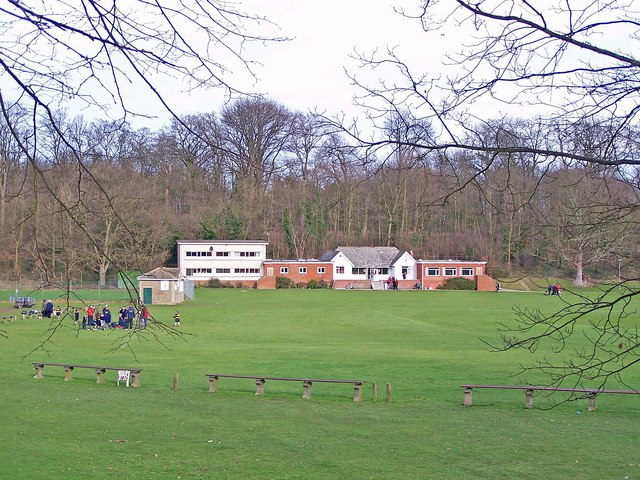
- Gore Court Cricket Club Located within Grove Park, Key Street, Sittingbourne
- Interactive map of The Grove, Gore Court

Ground information
- Location: Sittingbourne, Kent
- Country: England
- Coordinates: 51.346°N 0.706°E
- Home club: Gore Court Cricket Club
- Establishment: 1860

Team information
Gore Court Cricket Club	(1929–present)
Kent County Cricket Club Second XI	(1930–1997)
- As of 6 September 2010; Source: CricketArchive

The Grove, Gore Court is a sports ground in Sittingbourne in Kent. It is used for cricket and hockey by Gore Court. The ground is to the west of the centre of Sittingbourne, along the main A2 London road.

== History ==
The first recorded cricket match on the ground was in 1860, when the Gentlemen of Kent played the Gentlemen of Berkshire. The Kent County Cricket Club Second XI first used the ground in the 1930 Minor Counties Championship against Wiltshire. From 1930 to 1997, the ground held a combined total of 38 Second XI fixtures for the Kent Second XI in the Minor Counties Championship, Second XI Championship and Second XI Trophy.

In the 1973 Women's Cricket World Cup, the ground held a single match between Young England women and Jamaica women.

The ground is the home venue of Gore Court Cricket Club who play in the Kent Cricket League and have used the ground since 1929. The club's previous ground was on Bell Road in the centre of the town. Gore Court Hockey Club has shared the ground since 1930 and formally merged with the cricket club after the Second World War. The ground was used for Hockey County Championship matches between 1967 and the early 1980s. Jason Lee, who went on to coach the England and Great Britain men's teams and the England women's team, played for the club and represented Great Britain at the 1992 and 1996 Olympic Games.

The ground was also used for staging tennis tournaments. The Sittingbourne and Gore Court Archery & Lawn Tennis Club held annual tennis tournament called the Gore Court Championships there from 1877 to 1926.
