= Charles Walder Grinstead =

English tennis player

- Full name: Charles Walder Grinstead
- Country (sports): England
- Born: 1 December 1860; Teignmouth, England
- Died: 16 March 1930 (aged 69); Nikenbah, Australia

Singles
- Career record: 74–13
- Career titles: 13

Grand Slam singles results
- Wimbledon: F (1884)

Charles Walder Grinstead (1 December 1860 – 16 March 1930) was an English champion tennis player. He reached the quarter-finals at Wimbledon 1883. Grinstead reached the Wimbledon All Comers Final in 1884, where he beat Ernest Renshaw before losing to Herbert Lawford. Together with C. E. Weldon, Grinstead won the Oxford Men's Doubles in 1883. In 1884, the Oxford Men's Doubles event and its trophy were handed over to the All England Club to be known as the All England Men's Doubles as part of the Wimbledon Championships; consequently winners of the Oxford events are included as Wimbledon champions.

== Early life ==
Charles Walder Grinstead was born on 1 December 1860 in Teignmouth, Devon, England, the son of Charles Grinstead (a Church of England cleric) and his wife Sarah A. (née Stanley). He was educated at the University of Oxford, matriculating in 1879 as a member of Keble College and graduating in 1874 as a member of Charsley's Hall.

== Grand Slam finals ==
=== Singles (1 runner-up) ===
Result	Year	Championship	Surface	Opponent	Score
Loss	1884	Wimbledon Championships	Grass	(Scotland) Herbert Lawford	5–7, 6–2, 2–6, 7–9

== Career finals ==
=== Singles:19 (13 titles, 6 runners-up) ===
Category + (Titles)
Major (0)
National (0)
Regional (1)
County (3)
Regular (9)

Titles by Surface
Clay – Outdoor (0)
Grass – Outdoor (10)
Hard – Outdoor (2)
Wood – Indoor (0)

Outcome	No.	Date	Tournament	Location	Surface	Opponent	Score
Winner	1.	1882	Essex Championships	Brentwood	Grass	(United Kingdom) Nalton Womersley	6–4, 6–3, 6–3
Runner-up	1.	1883	South of England Championships	Eastbourne	Grass	(United Kingdom) Teddy Williams	6–1 8–6 4–6, 7–5
Winner	2.	1883	Leicester Open	Leicester	Grass	(United Kingdom) Ernest Wool Lewis	4–6, 6–3, 6–2, 6–1
Winner	3.	1883	Sussex County Lawn Tennis Club Spring Tournament	Brighton	Hard	(United Kingdom) Donald Charles Stewart	6–3, 5–7, 7–5, 1–6, 6–4
Winner	4.	1883	Victoria Park Lawn Tennis Tournament	Exeter	Grass	(United Kingdom) H.H. Green	6–3, 5–7, 7–5, 1–6, 6–4
Winner	5.	1883	Exmouth Open	Exmouth	Grass	(United Kingdom) Teddy Williams	6–2, 6–5, 6–4
Winner	6.	1883	Edgbaston Open	Edgbaston	Grass	(United Kingdom) Walter William Chamberlain	6–3, 6–3
Runner-up	2.	1883	Sussex County Lawn Tennis Autumn Tournament	Brighton	Grass	(United Kingdom) Herbert Wilberforce	8–6, 3–6, 10–8, 4–6, 1–6
Winner	7.	1883	Leamington Open	Leamington Spa	Grass	(United Kingdom) Herbert Wilberforce	6–4, 6–3, 6–2
Winner	8.	1883	Essex Championships (2)	Brentwood	Grass	(United Kingdom) P. Colley	6–3, 6–3
Runner-up	3.	1884	Wimbledon Championships	London	Grass	(Scotland) Herbert Lawford	1–6, 3–6, 4–6
Winner	9.	1884	Derbyshire Championships	Buxton	Grass	(Republic of Ireland) Ernest Browne	6–3, 6–3
Winner	10.	1884	Exmouth Open (2)	Exmouth	Grass	(United Kingdom) Erskine Gerald Watson	6–2, 6–2, 6–3
Winner	11.	1884	Middlesex Championships	Chiswick	Grass	(United Kingdom) Donald Charles Stewart	6–1, 4–6, 12–10, 6–3
Winner	12.	1884	Essex Championships (3)	Colchester	Grass	(United Kingdom) Edward Neville Cubitt	6–0, 6–4
Runner-up	4.	1892	Gulf Coast Championships	Tampa	Asphalt	(United States) Albert Empie Wright	6–4, 2–6, 2–6, 2–6
Winner	13.	1892	Tropical Championships	St. Augustine	Asphalt	(United States) Oliver Samuel Campbell	6–0, 6–4
Runner-up	5.	1894	Gulf Coast Championships	Tampa	Asphalt	(United States) Robert Wrenn	5–6, 3–6
Runner-up	6.	1894	Tropical Championships	St. Augustine	Asphalt	(United States) Oliver Campbell	w.o.

== Later life ==
Having completed his B.A. at Oxford, Grinstead was intended to become a Church of England cleric like his father. While Grinstead had enjoyed his academic studies and his sport at university, he did not wish to become a cleric. Instead in the spring of 1885, he immigrated to Ontario, Canada where he spent nine months, and then relocated to the United States of America.

Charles Walder Grinstead died in Nikenbah, Hervey Bay, Queensland, Australia on 16 March 1930. He was buried in Polson Cemetery, Hervey Bay, Queensland.
