= Magnolia Springs Open =

Defunct tennis tournament
- Tour: USNLTA Circuit
- Founded: 1891; 134 years ago
- Abolished: 1894; 131 years ago
- Location: Magnolia Springs, Orlando, Florida, United States
- Venue: Magnolia Springs Tennis Club
- Surface: Hard

The Magnolia Springs Open was a men's and women's hard cement court tennis tournament founded in 1891. The tournament was organised by the Magnolia Springs Tennis Club and was played in Magnolia Springs, Orlando, Florida, United States and was held annually until 1894 as part of the USNLTA Circuit when it was discontinued.

== History ==
The Magnolia Springs Open was first held in 1891 it was organized by the Magnolia Springs Tennis Club, and was played at the Magnolia Springs Resort Hotel, Magnolia Springs, Orlando Florida United States. The men's singles title was won by Albert Empie Wright. The tournament was an official sanctioned vent of the United States National Lawn Tennis Association. The final edition was held in 1894 with the winner of the men's singles being Gregory Seeley Bryan. In 1895 the club did not renew the tournament and it was discontinued.

== Finals ==
=== Men's singles ===
(incomplete roll)

| Year | Winners | Runners-up | Score |
|---|---|---|---|
| 1891 | (United States) Albert Empie Wright | (United States) J.B. Baumgarten | 6–2, 6–4, 7–5. |
| 1892 | (United States) Frank Beach | (United States) John W. Nichols Jr | 6–2, 6–2, 6–4. |
| 1893 | (United States) Clarence Hobart | (United States) Harry Eugene Avery | 6–3, 6–1, 6–3. |
| 1894 | (United States) Gregory Seeley Bryan | (United States) Edward Morton | 6–2, 6–3, 6–0. |

=== Mixed doubles ===
(incomplete roll)

| Year | Winners | Runners-up | Score |
|---|---|---|---|
| 1893 | (United States) Gregory Seeley Bryan (United States) Maud Reynolds | (United States) John A Morton (United States) Miss. White | def. |
| 1894 | (United States) Gregory Seeley Bryan (2) (United States) Maud Reynolds (2) | (United States) Edward Morton (United States) Miss. White | def. |
