= Albert Empie Wright =

American tennis player

Albert Wright
- Full name: Albert Empie Wright
- Country (sports): United States
- Born: September 18, 1867 Wilmington, North Carolina, United States
- Died: March 16, 1945 (aged 77) Southern Pines, North Carolina, United States
- Turned pro: 1886 (amateur tour)
- Retired: 1899

Singles
- Career record: 59–49
- Career titles: 3

Grand Slam singles results
- US Open: QF (1888)

Albert Empie Wright born (18 September 1867 – 16 March 1945) was an American tennis player then later lawyer. He was a quarter finalist at the 1888 U.S. National Championships. He was active from 1886 to 1899 where contested 13 career finals and won 3 singles titles.

== Career ==
Albert Empie Wright was born in Wilmington, North Carolina, United States on 18 September 1867. He played his first tournament in 1886 at the national Intercollegiate Championships where he lost in the first round to Valentine Gill Hall. In 1887 he played at the U.S. National Championships where he was beaten in the first round by Quincy Shaw. In 1888 he reached his first tournament final at the Bergen County Open where he lost to Oliver Samuel Campbell.

He won his first singles title in 1890 at Southern Championships, he then won the Magnolia Springs Open in (1891), and the Gulf Coast Championships in (1892). In addition he was a finalist at the Tropical Championships (1889, 1891), the New Jersey State Championships (1890), the Middle States Championships (1890), the Tuxedo Open (1891), Southern Championships (1891, 1892), and the Gulf Coast Championships in (1893). In 1899 Albert played his final singles event at the Niagara International Tournament in Canada where he reached the semi-finals.

His younger brother Marion Randolph Wright was also a notable tennis player.

== Career finals ==
=== Singles (13), titles (3), runners up (10) ===
(*) Denotes All-Comers final (w.o.) denotes walkover.

Category + (Titles)
Major (0)
National ()
International (0)
Provincial/Regional/State (2)
County (0)
Regular (1)

Titles by Surface
Clay – Outdoor (1)
Grass – Outdoor (0)
Hard – Outdoor (2)
Unknown – Outdoor (0)
Carpet – Indoor (0)
Wood – Indoor (0)

( * denotes All Comers Final)

No	Result	Date	Tournament	Location	Surface	Opponent	Score
1.	Loss	16‑Aug‑1887	Narragansette Pier Open	Narragansett	Clay	(United States) Walter V. R. Berry	3–6, 2–6, 2–6.
1.	Loss	7‑Jul‑1888	Bergen County Open	Englewood	Clay	(United States) Oliver Campbell	2–6, 5–7, 6–4, 4–6.
2.	Loss	9‑Mar‑1889	Tropical Championships *	St. Augustine	Hard	(United States) Oliver Campbell	2–6, 5–7, 6–4, 4–6.
3.	Loss	16‑Aug‑1887	Tropical Championships *	St. Augustine	Hard	(United States) Oliver Campbell	2–6, 5–7, 6–4, 4–6.
1.	Win	25-May-1890	Southern Championships	Baltimore	Clay	(United States) Fred Mansfield	?.
4.	Loss	12‑Jun‑1890	Middle States Championships	Rochester	Grass	(United States) Howard Taylor	2–6, 5–7, 6–4, 4–6.
5.	Loss	28‑Jun‑1890	New Jersey Championships	South Orange	Grass	(United States) Clarence Hobart	w.o.
2.	Win	8-Mar-1891	Magnolia Springs Open	Magnolia Springs	Hard	(United States) J.B. Baumgarten	6–2, 6–4, 7–5.
6.	Loss	15‑Mar‑1891	Tropical Championships	St. Augustine	Hard	(United States) Oliver Campbell	8–10, 1–6, 5–7.
7.	Loss	22‑May‑1891	Southern Championships	Washington	Clay	(United States) Edward L. Hall	1–6, 0–6, 5–7.
8.	Loss	13‑Jun‑1891	Tuxedo Park Open	Tuxedo Park	Grass	(United States) Edward L. Hall	4–6, 6–4, 4–6, 6–4, 0–6.
9.	Loss	30‑May‑1892	Southern Championships	Washington	Clay	(United States) Edward L. Hall	6–4, 2–6, 0–6, 6–2, 0–6.
10.	Win	1-Apr-1892	Gulf Coast Championships	Tampa	Hard	(England) Charles Grinstead	4–6, 6–4, 6–2, 6–2.
11.	Loss	16‑Jul‑1893	Gulf Coast Championships	Tampa	Hard	(United States) Bob Wrenn	2–6, 2–6, 2–6.
