= Gulf State Championships =

Defunct tennis tournament
- Tour: USNLTA Circuit (1892-1923); ILTF Circuit (1923-68)
- Founded: 1892; 133 years ago
- Abolished: 1968; 57 years ago
- Location: Baton Rouge; Tampa; New Orleans; Shreveport
- Venue: Tampa Bay LTC (1892-94); New Orleans LTC (1902-16)
- Surface: Grass; Hard

The Gulf State Championships was a men's and women's tennis tournament founded in 1892 as the Gulf Coast Championships. It was first played at the Tampa Bay Lawn Tennis Club, Tampa Bay Hotel, Tampa, Florida, United States in 1892. In 1968 the final edition was played at Baton Rouge, Louisiana, after which when it was downgraded from the main worldwide ILTF Circuit.

== History ==
In 1892 the first Gulf Coast Championships (also known as the Tampa Bay Championships) were held in at the Tampa Bay Lawn Tennis Club, Tampa Bay Hotel, Tampa, Florida, United States and was played on outdoor hard cement courts. The first winner of the men's singles title was Albert Empie Wright, he defeated a former top 4 ranked English tennis player, Charles Walder Grinstead in the final, who was touring America at this time. The first gulf tournament ran until 1894 when it was discontinued. In 1901 the tournament was revived under the new name the Gulf State Championships held at the New Orleans Lawn Tennis Club, New Orleans, Louisiana. The tournament continued to be held there until 1914. In 1968 the tournament was downgraded from the main worldwide ILTF Circuit and became a USLTA regional event.

== Finals ==
=== Men's singles ===
(incomplete roll)

| Year | Location | Champions | Runners-up | Score |
|---|---|---|---|---|
Gulf Coast Championships
| 1892 | Tampa | (United States) Albert Empie Wright | (England) Charles Walder Grinstead | 6–2, 8–6, 6–1. |
| 1893 | Tampa | (United States) Bob Wrenn | (United States) Albert Empie Wright | 6-2, 6–2, 6–2. |
| 1894 | Tampa | (United States) Gregory Seeley Bryan | (United States) Bob Wrenn | w.o. |
Gulf State Championships
| 1901 | New Orleans | (United States) R.G. Hunt | (United States) ? | ? |
| 1911 | New Orleans | (United States) Wallace F. Johnson | (United States) Nat Thornton | 6–3, 7–5, 6–2. |
| 1912 | New Orleans | (United States) Wallace F. Johnson (2) | (United States) Frank Richard Woodbury | 6–2, 6–0, 6-–2. |
| 1933 | Shreveport | (United States) Arthur Hodges Hendrix | (United States) Hudson Russell Hamm Jr. | 6–2, 6–0 6–2. |
| 1951 | New Orleans | (United States) Jack Tuero | (United States) Ham Richardson | 2–6, 6–1, 6–3, 6–1. |
| 1957 | Baton Rouge | (United States) Tommy Robinson | (United States) Ron Fisher | 4–6, 11–9, 7–5. |
| 1958 | Baton Rouge | (United States) Larry Caton | (United States) Don Caton | 7–5, 6–1, 1–6, 9–11, 6–4. |
| 1959 | Baton Rouge | (United States) Ron Fisher | (United States) James G. Schmidt Sr | 6–2, 6–8, 6–4. |
| 1960 | Baton Rouge | (United States) Andy Lloyd | (United States) Tom Falkenburg | 6–3, 6–3. |
| 1961 | Baton Rouge | (United States) Jerry Walters | (United States) Clint Nettleton | 5–7, 6–3, 6–2. |
| 1962 | Baton Rouge | (United States) Jerry Walters (2) | (United States) Clint Nettleton | 6–4, 4–6, 6–0. |
| 1963 | Baton Rouge | (United States) Tom Karp | (United States) Upton Giles III | 6–1, 6–3. |
| 1966 | Baton Rouge | (United States) Steve Faulk | (United States) Robert Ecuyer | 6–3, 6–4. |

=== Women's singles ===
(incomplete roll)

| Year | Location | Champions | Runners-up | Score |
|---|---|---|---|---|
Gulf Coast Championships
| 1893 | Tampa | (United States) Miss Valentine Hobart | (United States) Miss Constance Talmage | 6–4, 6–3, 6–3. |
| 1894 | Tampa | (United States) Miss Valentine Hobart | (United States) Miss Elizabeth Stroud | 6–4, 3–6, 6–2 |
Gulf State Championships
| 1903 | New Orleans | (United States) Mrs. R. C. Montgomery | (United States) May Logan | 6–4, 6–4 |
| 1906 | New Orleans | (United States) May Logan | (United States) ?. | ? |
| 1914 | New Orleans | (United States) Ethelyn Legendre | (United States) May Logan | 3–6, 6–2 6–2 |
| 1916 | New Orleans | (United States) Mrs Irving Murphy | (United States) Ethelyn Legendre | 6–1, 6–2 |
| 1933 | Shreveport | (United States) Charlotte MacQuiston | (United States) LaVerne Stages | 4–6, 6–1, 6–2 |
| 1934 | Shreveport | (United States) Charlotte MacQuiston (2) | (United States) ? | ? |
| 1957 | Baton Rouge | (United States) Carolyn Rogers | (United States) Sue Zigerbein | 6–0, 6–2 |
| 1958 | Baton Rouge | (United States) Carolyn Rogers (2) | (United States) Sylvia Bradley | 6–3, 6–2 |
| 1961 | Baton Rouge | (United States) Carolyn Rogers (3) | (United States) Kitty Moody | 6–4, 6–1 |
| 1963 | Baton Rouge | (United States) Patsy Lowdon | (United States) Putsy Trice | 4–6, 8–6, 6–3 |
