= Francis Louis Fassitt =

American tennis player

Francis L. Fassitt was an American tennis player, residing in France, who finished runner-up to Jean Schopfer in the singles event of the Amateur French Championships in 1892.

== Grand Slam finals ==
=== Singles: (1 runner-up) ===
Result	Year	Championship	Surface	Opponent	Score
Loss	1892	French Championships	Clay	(France) Jean Schopfer	2–6, 6–1, 2–6
