= Westchester County Championships =

Defunct tennis tournament
- Event name: Westchester Lawn Tennis Club (Invitation); Westchester Invitation; Westchester Bowl Invitation; Westchester County Championships
- Tour: USNLTA Circuit (1885–1923); ILTF World Circuit (1924–69) men (1924–72) women ILTF Independent Circuit (1970–74) men (1973–74) women
- Founded: 1885; 140 years ago
- Abolished: 1974; 51 years ago
- Location: Armonk; Briarcliff Manor; Hartsdale; Mount Vernon; Pelham Manor; Port Chester; Rye; White Plains
- Surface: Grass; Clay; Hard

The Westchester County Championships was a tennis tournament founded in 1885 as the Westchester Lawn Tennis Club (Invitation) and first played at the Westchester Lawn Tennis Club, Harrison, Westchester County, New York, United States on grass courts, later switching to clay courts, the finally hard courts. The tournament was played at various locations during its run until 1974.

== History ==
In 1884 the Westchester Lawn Tennis Club was founded. In September 1885 it staged the Westchester Invitation men's singles tennis tournament that event ran until 1895 when it was discontinued when the lawn tennis club was disbanded. In 1902 a new tournament was revived as a men's doubles event called the Westchester Invitation Round Robin.

In 1911 a singles tournament called the Westchester County Championships was revived and was played at the Country Club of Westchester. In 1912 the tournament moved to Mount Vernon, New York and was organized by the Westchester Lawn Tennis Association. During the 1950s when played in Rye, New York the men's event was known as the Westchester Bowl Invitation. The first winner of the men's singles was Robert Livingston Beeckman, and the final men's winner was Australian player Rod Brent.

== Finals ==
=== Men's Singles ===
(Incomplete roll)

Year	Champions	Runners-up	Score
1885	(United States) Robert Livingston Beeckman	(United States) Howard Augustus Taylor	6–4, 6–4, 6–4.
1886	(United States) Howard Augustus Taylor	(United States) Henry Slocum	6–3, 6–3.
1887	(United States) Henry Slocum	(United States) Valentine Gill Hall	7–5, 6–3.
1888	(United States) Oliver Samuel Campbell	(United States) Robert Livingston Beeckman	6–8, 6–3, 6–4, 5–7, 6–3.
1889	(United States) Howard Augustus Taylor	(United States) Oliver Samuel Campbell	6–4, 6–2, 7–5.
1890	(United States) Bob Huntington	(United States) Percy Knapp	7–9, 4–6, 6–3, 6–3, 6–2.
1891	(United States) Clarence Hobart	(United States) Bob Huntington	7–9, 4–6, 6–3, 6–3, 6–2.
1892	(United States) Richard Stevens	(United States) Edward L. Hall	7–9, 4–6, 6–3, 6–3, 6–2.
1912	(United States) Allen Toby	(United States) Edgar F Leo	6–3, 1–6, 6–4
1919	(United States) George King	?	
1920	(United States) Frank Hunter	(United States) Harold Throckmorton	1–6, 2–6, 6–2, 8–6, 8–6.
1922	(United States) George King	(United States) Herbert Bowman	6–3, 6–4, 6–2.
1931	(United States) Melvin H. Partridg	(United States) Edward G. Tarangioli	7–9, 6–0, 6–1, 6–2.
1932	(United States) Eugene McCauliff	(United States) Berkeley Bell	7–5, 6–3, 6–4.
1954	(United States) William Tully	(United States) Bob Greene	6–0, 6–1, 6–0.
1955	(United States) Herb Flam	(United States) Sidney Schwartz	6–3, 6–4.
1958	(United States) Vic Seixas	(Sweden) Ulf Schmidt	13–11, 6–2.
1967	(United States) Dick Stockton	(United States) Ken Abere	6–1, 6–2, 7–5.
↓ Open era ↓
1970	(United States) Dave Bonner	(United States) John F. Mangan	6–1, 6–4.
1974	(Australia) Rod Brent	(United States) Bailey Brown	7–6, 6–2.

=== Women's Singles ===
(Incomplete roll)

Year	Champions	Runners-up	Score
1914	(United States) Clare Cassell	(United States) Eleanor Coward	6–4, 6–3
1918	(United States) Helen Gilleaudeau	(United States) Madeline Lowerre	6–2, 6–2
1920	(United States) Molla Mallory	(United States) Eleanor Goss	6–3, 3–6, 6–0
1931	(United States) Margaret Muhl	(United States) Clara Greenspan	8–6, 3–6, 6–4
1932	(United States) Maud Levi	(United States) Norma Taubele	6–2, 6–4
1958	(United States) Bonnie Mencher	(United States) Joan Silbersher	6–4, 6–4
1959	(United States) Sally Wilson	(United States) Laura Krieger	6–4, 6–1
1964	(United States) Yale Stockwell	(United States) Adria Fisher Price	6–0, 6–0
1965	(United States) Diane Matzner	(United States) Marilyn Aschner	4–6, 6–3, 1–1, retd.
1968	(United States) Pat Stewart	(United States) Susan Tenney	6–2, 6–3
↓ Open era ↓
1970	(United States) Louise Gonnerman	(United States) Pat Stewart	0–6, 6–3, 6–4
1973	(United States) Marilyn Aschner	(United States) Louise Gonnerman	6–4, 2–6, 6–2
