= Fred Mansfield =

English footballer

Personal information
- Full name: Frederick Charles Adam Mansfield
- Date of birth: 9 March 1915
- Place of birth: Cambridge, England
- Date of death: 1 January 1992 (aged 76)
- Place of death: Cambridge, England
- Position: Right back

Senior career*
Years	Team	Apps	(Gls)
–1939	Cambridge Town		
1939–1947	Brentford	0	(0)
1947–1948	Norwich City	34	(0)
- Bury Town
- * Club domestic league appearances and goals

Frederick Charles Adam Mansfield (9 March 1915 – 1 January 1992) was an English professional footballer who played as a right back in the Football League for Norwich City.
