= Northumberland Championships =

Defunct tennis tournament
- Tour: Pre open era
- Founded: 1882
- Abolished: 1983
- Location: Newcastle-upon-Tyne, Northumberland, Great Britain
- Venue: Various (1882–1923); Brandling Lawn Tennis Club (1924–1973); Northumberland Club (1974–1983)

The Northumberland Championships or Northumberland Lawn Tennis Championships or Northumberland County Championships and later known as the ESAB Northumberland Open for sponsorship reasons was a men's and women's open grass court tennis tournament held first held at the South Northumberland Cricket Ground and various other venues until 1923. It was then staged at the Brandling Lawn Tennis Club (1924–1974), the Northumberland Club (1974–1983), Newcastle-upon-Tyne, Northumberland, Great Britain. The tournament ran from 1882 to 1983.

== History ==
Attempts were made establish a large annual tournament in the County of Northumberland located in North East England, which led to the creation of the first Northumberland County Championships held at the South Northumberland Cricket Ground, Gosforth, Newcastle upon Tyne, Northumberland, England in July 1882. However the tournament did not have a premenant home until 1924 when the Northumberland Lawn Tennis Ground Co Ltd was formed in order to secure permanent home for the Northumberland Open Tennis Tournament, and secondly, to provide a new permanent venue for Brandling Lawn Tennis Club, then the leading tennis club in the north east.

The Northumberland Championships ran for 101 years, and was reasonably successful in attracting attract top players to it. The championships were not staged during World War I or World War II. It continued to be staged after the start of the open era in 1968 it later became known as the Northumberland Open, longer than many other old tournaments with a great tradition. It remained a featured tournament in the annual tennis tours for a considerable time. In 1974 the host venue the Brandling Lawn Tennis Club merged with the Portland Lawn Tennis Club and the Osborne Lawn Tennis Club to create the Northumberland Club which continued to stage the championships tournament.

Notable winners of the men's singles included Joseph Bruce Ismay (1884), Patrick Bowes-Lyon (1886–1888), Harold Mahony (1891) and William Renshaw (1893), Pat Spence (1922) Cam Malfroy (1938), Ignacy Tłoczyński (1952) and John Lloyd (1977). Previous women's singles champions included Charlotte Cooper (1895), Dorothea Douglass Chambers (1908), Anita Lizana (1935–1937) and Gem Hoahing (1948), Angela Mortimer (1951) and Judy Tegart (1968). The Northumberland Championships ran until 1983 when it was abolished. The final men's singles champion was Britain's Buster Mottram and the final women's singles champion was Catherine Berry.

== Finals ==
=== Men's Singles ===
(incomplete roll)

Year	Champion	Runner up	Score
1882	(England) Mark Fenwick	(England) Henry Armstrong	2–0 (sets)
1883	(England) Mark Fenwick (2)	(England) Minden Fenwick	3–0 (sets)
1884	(England) Joseph Ismay	(England) Howard Pease	3–6, 6–1, 6–1, 6–4
1885	(United States) Hamilton Emmons	(England) Percival Fenwick	8–6, 4–6, 6–3, 7–9, 6–2
1886	(Scotland) Patrick Bowes-Lyon	(England) Percival Fenwick	6–3, 6–0, 6–2
1887	(Scotland) Patrick Bowes-Lyon (2)	(Scotland) Herbert Bowes-Lyon	6–2, 6–3, 6–4
1888	(Scotland) Patrick Bowes-Lyon (3)	(United Kingdom) Percival Leather	6–0, 6–0, 6–0
1889	(United Kingdom) Frank Noon	(United Kingdom) George Mewburn	8–6, 6–3, 4–6, 6–4
1890	(Ireland) Manliffe Goodbody	(United Kingdom) Frank Noon	6–3, 6–4, 6–3
1891	(Ireland) Harold Mahony	(Ireland) Tom Chaytor	6–2, 6–4, 6–3
1892	(Ireland) Tom Chaytor	(Ireland) Harold Mahony	6–0, 10–8, 6–2
1893	(United Kingdom) William Renshaw	(Ireland) Tom Chaytor	6–2, 6–2, 2–6, 6–1
1894	(Ireland) Harold Mahony (2)	(United Kingdom) Harry S. Barlow	6–3, 6–3, 8–6
1895	(United Kingdom) Harry S. Barlow	(United Kingdom) Herbert Baddeley	8–6, 6–3, 4–6, 4–6, 6–4
1896	(United Kingdom) Ernest Black	(United Kingdom) Sydney H. Smith	6–6, 6–3, 4–6, 6–3
1897	(United Kingdom) Sydney H. Smith	(United Kingdom) George Orme	6–3, 6–3, 6–1
1898	(United Kingdom) Sydney H. Smith (2)	(United Kingdom) George Hillyard	6–2, 6–2, 6–4
1899	(Ireland) Harold Mahony (3)	(United Kingdom) Wilberforce Eaves	8–6, 6–3
1900	(United Kingdom) George Hillyard	(United Kingdom) George Greville	5–7, 6–2, 7–5, 6–2
1901	(United Kingdom) Sydney H. Smith (3)	(United Kingdom) John Boucher	7–5, 7–5, 6–1
1902	(United Kingdom) Sydney H. Smith (4)	(Ireland) George Ball-Greene	6–2, 6–3, 6–3
1903	(United Kingdom) John Boucher	(United Kingdom) Cecil Crawley	6–4, 7–5, 6–3
1904	(United Kingdom) Laurie Doherty	(Ireland) George Ball-Greene	6–4, 6–1
1905	(Australia) Alfred Dunlop	(Australia) Norman Brookes	6–3, 6–3, 7–5
1906	(United Kingdom) George Hillyard (2)	(United Kingdom) Wilberforce Eaves	7–5, 1–6, 6–3
1907	(United Kingdom) Wilberforce Eaves	(United Kingdom) A.H. Green	6–2, 6–1, 6–2
1908	(United Kingdom) John Boucher (2)	(United Kingdom) George Hillyard	6–2, 6–2, 6–1
1909	(United Kingdom) Major Ritchie	(United Kingdom) Sydney Adams	3–6, 8–6, 6–2
1910	(United Kingdom) Major Ritchie (2)	(Australia) Stanley Doust	1–6, 6–2, 6–2, 6–4
1915–18	No tournament due to WWI		
1919	(Australia) Pat O'Hara Wood	(Australia) Stanley Doust	walkover
1920	(South Africa) Charles Winslow	(South Africa) Louis Raymond	3–6, 6–3, 6–3
1921	(United Kingdom) Ralph Watson	(United Kingdom) John Simpson	6–4, 6–4, 6–2
1922	(South Africa) Pat Spence	(United Kingdom) Cecil Tindell-Green	11-9, 3-6, 6-4, 4-6, 6-2
1923	(United Kingdom) Cecil Tindell-Green	(United Kingdom) Clive Branfoot	2–6, 1–6, 6–3, 6–0, 6–3
1924	(United Kingdom) Cecil Tindell-Green (2)	(United Kingdom) Maurice Summerson	6–1, 6–4
1926	(United Kingdom) Teddy Higgs	(United Kingdom) Arthur Lowe	6–1, 4–6, 6–4, 6–4
1928	(New Zealand) Buster Andrews	(United Kingdom) Arthur Low	6–0, 6–3, 6–1
1931	(Socialist Federal Republic of Yugoslavia) Franjo Šefer	(Socialist Federal Republic of Yugoslavia) Franjo Kukuljević	7–5, 9–7, 1–6, 4–6, 6–2
1933	(United Kingdom) D.O. Hobbis	(United Kingdom) A. Heron	6–2, 6–3, 6–4
1934	(United Kingdom) Frank Wilde	(United Kingdom) Dickie Ritchie	5–7, 6–0, 6–2
1935	(New Zealand) Alan Stedman	(New Zealand) Cam Malfroy	6–4, 7–5
1936	(New Zealand) Cam Malfroy	(United Kingdom) Dickie Ritchie	6–4, 6–1
1937	(United Kingdom) Raymond Tuckey	(United Kingdom) Jimmy Jones	6–1, 6–1
1938	(New Zealand) Cam Malfroy (2)	(United Kingdom) Don Butler	11–9, 6–1
1939	(United Kingdom) Don Butler	(New Zealand) Cam Malfroy	6–3, 6–4, 6–4
1940–45	No tournament due to WWII		
1949	(United Kingdom) Pat Hughes	(United Kingdom) Don Butler	2–6, 6–4, 7–5
1950	(Australia) Geoff Brown	(United Kingdom) Don Butler	6−0, 6−4
1951	(South Africa) Nigel Cockburn	(United Kingdom) Paddy Roberts	11−9, 6−2
1952	(Poland) Ignacy Tloczynski	(Australia) Don Tregonning	7–5, 7–5
1953	(United Kingdom) Billy Knight	(Rhodesia) Don Black	6–3, 6–3
1954	(New Zealand) John Barry	(United Kingdom) John Horn	6–3, 6–0
1955	(Australia) Mal Anderson	(Australia) Cedric Mason	4–6, 6–0, 6–4
1956	(United Kingdom) Tony Pickard	(United Kingdom) John Ward	6–3, 6–4
1958	(Australia) Mervyn Rose	(Australia) Warren Woodcock	4–6, 6–3, 6–3
1959	(United Kingdom) Tony Pickard (2)	(United Kingdom) Jimmy Tattersall	6–3, 6–2
1960	(United Kingdom) Trevor Adamson	(United Kingdom) Charlie Applewhaite	6–2, 6–1
1965	(United Kingdom) Stanley Matthews	(United Kingdom) Gerald Battrick	8–6, 6–4
1966	(India) Shiv Misra	(New Zealand) Brian Fairlie	6–3, 6–4
1969	(Pakistan) Haroon Rahim	(United States) Jeff Borowiak	3–6, 6–3, 6–2
1970	(United Kingdom) John de Mendoza	(United Kingdom) John Paish	6–0, 6–8, 6–2
1971	(South Africa) Bob Hewitt	(Australia) Ray Keldie	6–1, 6–4
1972	(Australia) Ray Keldie	(India) Premjit Lall	6–3, 3–6, 6–1
1973	(Australia) Bob Giltinan	(United Kingdom) John Feaver	6–3, 6–2
1974	(United Kingdom) John Paish	(United Kingdom) John Clifton	6–3, 3–6, 6–0
1975	(Rhodesia) Tony Fawcett	(United Kingdom) Bobby Wilson	6–4, 6–4
1977	(United Kingdom) John Lloyd	(United Kingdom) Roger Taylor	6–3, 6–4
1978	(United Kingdom) Willie Davies	(United Kingdom) Chris Wells	6–0, 6–1
1979	(United Kingdom) Buster Mottram	(South Africa) Bob Hewitt	6–2, 6–0
1980	(South Africa) Frew McMillan	(United Kingdom) Roger Taylor	7–6, 7–6
1981	(United Kingdom) Buster Mottram (2)	(South Africa) Frew McMillan	6–0, 7–6

=== Women's Singles ===
(incomplete roll)

Year	Champion	Runner up	Score
1882	(England) Alice Fenwick	(England) Miss Bowlby	6–4, 6–1
1883	(England) Jane Fenwick	(England) Alice Fenwick	6–4, 6–1
1884	(England) Alice Fenwick (2)	(Ireland) Connie Butler	6–3, 6–1
1885	(England) Alice Fenwick (3)	(England) Ann Dod	6–4, 6–4
1886	(Ireland) Connie Butler	(England) Alice Fenwick	3–6, 6–4, 6–3
1887	(Ireland) Connie Butler (2)	(England) Ann Dod	6–2, 6–2
1888	(Ireland) Connie Butler (3)	(United Kingdom) Ann Dod	6–3, 6–1
1889	(United Kingdom) Helen Jackson	(United Kingdom) Alice Pickering	6–2, 6–4
1890	(United Kingdom) Helen Jackson (2)	(United Kingdom) Jane Corder	6–4, 6–3
1891	(United Kingdom) Helen Jackson (3)	(United Kingdom) Beatrice Draffen	6–3, 6–1
1892	(United Kingdom) Jane Fenwick (2)	(United Kingdom) Beatrice Draffen	1–6, 6–4, 6–2
1893	(United Kingdom) Jane Fenwick (3)	(United Kingdom) Helen Jackson	6–3, 3–6, 7–5
1894	(United Kingdom) Helen Jackson (4)	(United Kingdom) Alice Pickering	6–3, 6–3
1895	(United Kingdom) Charlotte Cooper	(United Kingdom) Helen Jackson	6–1, 6–4
1896	(United Kingdom) Charlotte Cooper (2)	(United Kingdom) Alice Pickering	6–2, 6–4
1897	(United Kingdom) Charlotte Cooper (3)	(United Kingdom) Alice Pickering	4–6, 6–1, 6–4
1898	(United Kingdom) Alice Pickering	(United Kingdom) Ruth Dyas	6–4, 4–6, 7–5
1899	(United Kingdom) Alice Pickering (2)	(United Kingdom) Muriel Robb	6–3, 6–0
1900	(United Kingdom) Muriel Robb	(United Kingdom) Alice Pickering	6–1, 6–1
1901	(United Kingdom) Dorothea Douglass	(United Kingdom) Edith Boucher	6–2, 6–1
1902	(United Kingdom) Dorothea Douglass (2)	(United Kingdom) Alice Pickering	6–1, 6–2
1903	(United Kingdom) Dorothea Douglass (3)	(United Kingdom) Ethel Thomson	6–4, 11–9
1904	(United Kingdom) Dorothea Douglass (4)	(United Kingdom) Ethel Thomson	6–4, 6–2
1905	(United Kingdom) Connie Wilson	(United Kingdom) Dorothea Douglass	4–6, 6–1, 7–5
1906	(United Kingdom) Dorothea Douglass (5)	(United States) May Sutton	default
1907	(United Kingdom) Dorothea Chambers (6)	(United Kingdom) Charlotte Cooper Sterry	6–3, 6–0
1908	(United Kingdom) Dorothea Chambers (7)	(United Kingdom) Charlotte Cooper Sterry	6–1, 7–5
1909	(United Kingdom) Dora Boothby	(United Kingdom) Edith Hannam	6–1, 6–0
1910	(United Kingdom) Dora Boothby (2)	(United Kingdom) Helen Aitchison	6–1, 6–2
1911	(United Kingdom) Ethel Thomson Larcombe	(United Kingdom) Dora Boothby	6–1, 6–1
1912	(United Kingdom) Ethel Thomson Larcombe (2)	(United Kingdom) Mrs J.B. Perrett	6–1, 6–2
1913	(United States) Elizabeth Ryan	(United Kingdom) Ethel Thomson Larcombe	6–3, 6–2
1914	(United States) Elizabeth Ryan (2)	(United Kingdom) Edith Hannam	6–0, 6–1
1915–18	No tournament due to WWI		
1919	(United States) Elizabeth Ryan (3)	(United Kingdom) Ethel Thomson Larcombe	6–3, 6–4
1920	(United States) Elizabeth Ryan (4)	(United Kingdom) Doris Craddock	6–0, 6–1
1921	(United States) Elizabeth Ryan (5)	(United Kingdom) Lesley Bane	6–0, 6–0
1922	(United States) Elizabeth Ryan (6)	(United Kingdom) Ruth Watson	6–2, 6–1
1923	(United Kingdom) Ruth Watsom	(United Kingdom) M. Croft	6–3, 6–2
1924	(United Kingdom) Ruth Watson (2)	(United Kingdom) Marie Hazel	6–2, 6–1
1925	(United Kingdom) Ruth Watson (3)	(United Kingdom) Annie Cobb	1–6, 9–7, 6–2
1926	(United Kingdom) Ruth Watson (4)	(United Kingdom) Annie Cobb	6–1, 6–2
1927	(United Kingdom) Ruth Watson (5)	(United Kingdom) Claire Beckingham	6–3, 6–2
1928	(United Kingdom) Ruth Watson (6)	(United Kingdom) Dorothy Alexander	7–5, 6–3
1929	(United Kingdom) Ruth Watson (7)	(United Kingdom) Annie Cobb	6–1, 6–4
1930	(United Kingdom) Ruth Watson (8)	(United Kingdom) Mary Heeley	7–5, 6–4
1931	(United Kingdom) Mary Heeley	(United Kingdom) Ruth Watson	6–2, 6–1
1932	(United Kingdom) Dorothy Round	(United Kingdom) Ruth Watson	6–4, 6–4
1933	(United Kingdom) Dorothy Round (2)	(United Kingdom) Mary Heeley	6–3, 3–6, 6–1
1934	(Australia) Joan Hartigan	(United Kingdom) Susan Noel	3–6, 6–3, 6–3
1935	(Chile) Anita Lizana	(United Kingdom) Mary Hardwick	6–0, 6–1
1936	(Chile) Anita Lizana (2)	(United Kingdom) Mary Heeley	6–4, 6–2
1937	(Chile) Anita Lizana (3)	(United Kingdom) Freda James	11–9, 6–3
1938	(United Kingdom) Gem Hoahing	(United Kingdom) Mary Hardwick	2–6, 6–4, 7–5
1939	(United Kingdom) Gem Hoahing (2)	(United Kingdom) Valerie Scott	6–4, 1–6, 6–2
1940–45	No tournament due to WWII		
1946	(United Kingdom) Gem Hoahing (3)	(United Kingdom) Betty Passingham	6–1, 6–3
1947	(United Kingdom) Gem Hoahing (4)	(United Kingdom) Betty Clements	6–0, 6–2
1948	(United Kingdom) Gem Hoahing (5)	(United Kingdom) Georgie Woodgate	3–6, 6–3, 6–4
1949	(United Kingdom) Gem Hoahing (6)	(United Kingdom) Georgie Woodgate	6–4, 6–3
1950	(United Kingdom) Georgie Woodgate	(United Kingdom) Gem Hoahing	2–6, 6–4, 6–4
1951	(United Kingdom) Angela Mortimer	(United Kingdom) Pat Harrison	6–1, 6–3
1952	(United Kingdom) Angela Mortimer (2)	(United Kingdom) Billie Woodgate	6–3, 6–2
1953	(United Kingdom) Helen Fletcher	(United Kingdom) Pat Harrison	6–1, 6–3
1954	(United Kingdom) Helen Fletcher (2)	(United Kingdom) Shirley Bloomer	6–3, 6–4
1955	(United Kingdom) Shirley Bloomer	(Netherlands) Fenny ten Bosch	6–2, 6–0
1956	(United Kingdom) Ann Haydon	(United Kingdom) Elaine Watson	6–3, 6–2
1957	(United Kingdom) Ann Haydon (2)	(New Zealand) Ruia Morrison	6–1, 6–4
1958	(United Kingdom) Ann Haydon (3)	(Australia) Mary Bevis Hawton	6–4, 6–1
1959	(United Kingdom) Ann Haydon (4)	(New Zealand) Ruia Morrison	6–3, 6–3
1960	(United Kingdom) Ann Haydon (5)	(South Africa) Valerie Forbes	6–2, 6–3
1961	(United Kingdom) Angela Mortimer (3)	(South Africa) Sandra Reynolds	6–1, 6–1
1962	(United Kingdom) Elizabeth Starkie	(Australia) Madonna Schacht	6–3, 6–1
1963	(South Africa) Renee Schuurman	(United Kingdom) Elizabeth Starkie	5–7, 6–4, 6–4
1964	(United Kingdom) Ann Haydon Jones (6)	(United Kingdom) Elizabeth Starkie	6–2, 6–0
1965	(Australia) Margaret Smith	(Australia) Judy Tegart	6–4, 6–2
1966	(United Kingdom) Winnie Shaw	(Australia) Gail Sherriff	6–3, 4–6, 6–4
1967	(United Kingdom) Virginia Wade	(United Kingdom) Winnie Shaw	6–1, 6–2
1968	(Australia) Margaret Court (2)	(Australia) Judy Tegart	6–3, 6–2
1969	(Australia) Wendy Gilchrist	(United Kingdom) J. Wilshire	7–5, 6–2
1970	(United Kingdom) Corinne Molesworth	(United Kingdom) Marilyn Greenwood	6–3, 8–6
1971	(Australia) Barbara Hawcroft	(United Kingdom) Rita Bentley	6–1, 8–6
1972	(United Kingdom) Wendy Slaughter	(Australia) S. Hole	7–5, 6–2
1973	(United Kingdom) Sue Mappin	(United Kingdom) Wendy Slaughter	6–1, 6–1
1974	(United Kingdom) Mrs J. Paish	(United Kingdom) Wendy Slaughter	6–1, 6–1
1975	(United Kingdom) Cathy Drury	(United Kingdom) Lesley Charles	6–2, 6–2
1976	(United Kingdom) Corinne Molesworth (2)	(United Kingdom) Winnie Wooldridge	6–2, 6–2
1977	(United Kingdom) Winnie Wooldridge (2)	(United Kingdom) Corinne Molesworth	3–6, 6–4, 6–1
1978	(United Kingdom) Winnie Wooldridge (3)	(United Kingdom) Ann Haydon Jones	6–4, 6–4
1979	(United Kingdom) Cathy Drury (2)	(United Kingdom) Lesley Charles	6–2, 6–2
1980	(United Kingdom) Lesley Charles	(United Kingdom) Cathy Drury	6–2, 6–1
1981	(United Kingdom) Lesley Charles (2)	(United Kingdom) Anthea Cooper	6–1, 6–1
1982	(United Kingdom) R. Einy	(United Kingdom) J. Plackett	6–2, 6–2
1983	(United Kingdom) Catherine Berry	(United Kingdom) Lorrayne Gracie	6–4, 5–7, 6–4

== Event names ==
- Northumberland County Association Tournament (1882-1886)
- Northumberland County Championships (1887-1890)
- Northumberland County Lawn Tennis Championships (1891-1899)
- Northumberland Championships (1900–69)
- Northumberland Open (1970–71)
- Greenshield Northumberland Open (1971–74)
- ESAB Northumberland Open (1981–83)

== Sources ==
- Northumberland tennis—early shocks in the Northumberland lawn tennis championships. Newcastle Journal. The British Newspaper Archive. 1 August 1961.
- Northumberland Tennis and Squash Club. 94 Years of History. www.northumberlandclub.org. Northumberland Club. Retrieved 4 October 2022.
- Robertson, Max (1974). The encyclopedia of tennis. New York. Viking Press. ISBN 9780670294084.
- Whitaker's Almanack: Volume 20. London: J Whitaker & Sons. 1888.
