= Tropical Championships =

Defunct tennis tournament
- Tour: USNLTA Circuit (1887–1894)
- Founded: 1887; 138 years ago
- Abolished: 1894; 131 years ago
- Location: St. Augustine, Florida, United States
- Venue: Villa Zorayda (1887-88); Alcazar Hotel and Casino
- Surface: Asphalt (outdoors); Wood (indoors)

The Tropical Championships also called the Tropical Sectional Championships was a men's open tennis tournament founded in 1887 as the St. Augustine Lawn Tennis Club Tournament. It was staged annually by the St. Augustine Lawn Tennis Club, St. Augustine, Florida, United States until 1894.

== History ==
In March 1887 the St. Augustine Lawn Tennis Tournament was inaugurated at the St. Augustine Lawn Tennis Club, St. Augustine, Florida, United States, The first was held at the Villa Zorayda owned by a local business magnet Mr. Franklin W. Smith and was played on indoor wood courts. The first men's champion was Thomas Sterling Beckwith. In 1888 its name was changed to the Tropical Championships. In 1889 the tournament was moved to the Alcazar Hotel and Casino in St. Augustine where the tournament was then played on outdoor hard asphalt courts and remained there for its duration.

The championships were part of the USNLTA Circuit from 1887 until 1894. The tournament was mainly won by American players except for 1892 when the English tennis player Charles Walder Grinstead won the event. In 1894 the championships were discontinued the final singles champion was Oliver Campbell.

== Finals ==
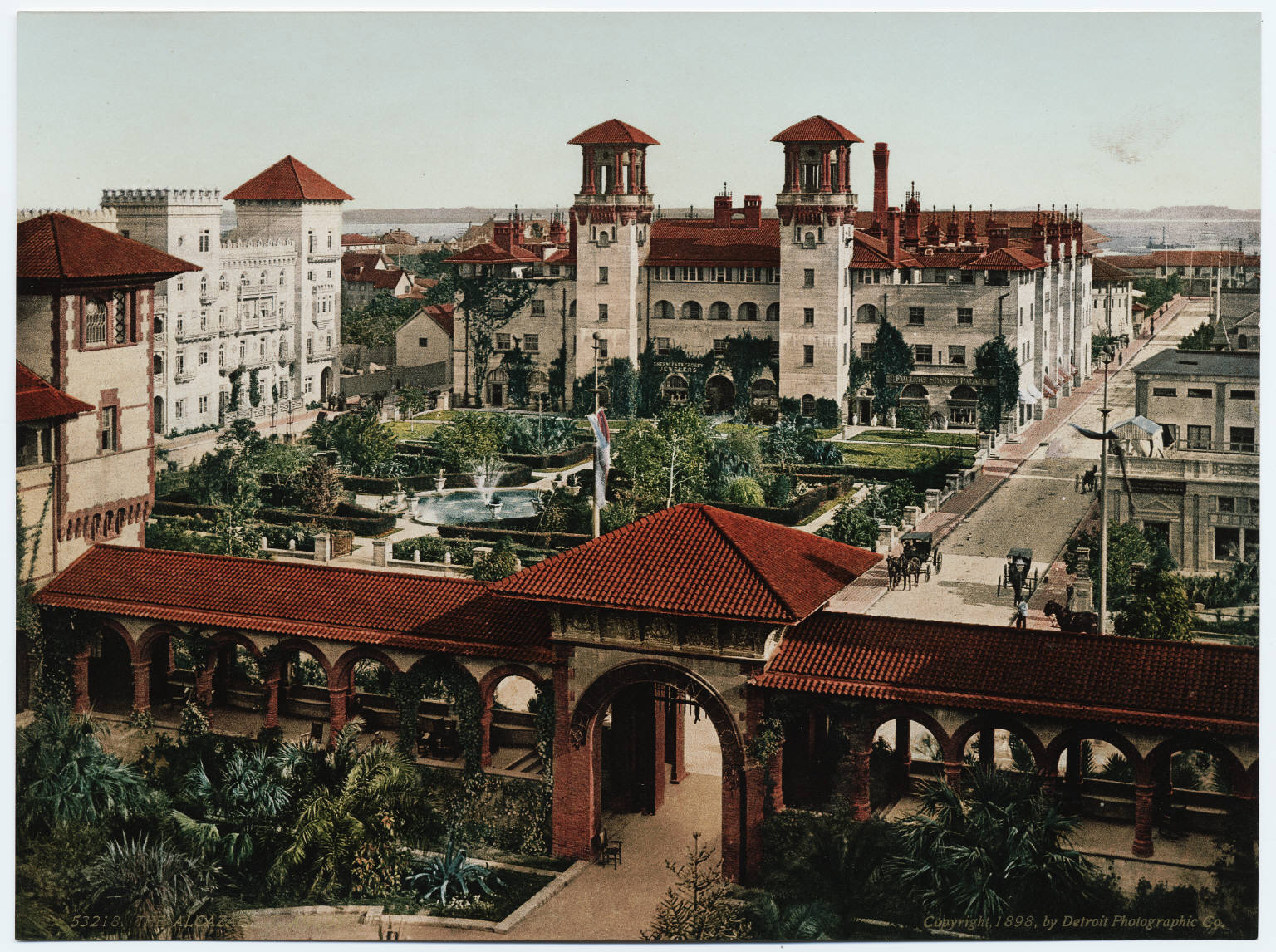
The historic Alcazar Hotel and Casino, St. Augustine, Florida (built 1887). The image taken c. 1897-1924 was the location of this event (1889-94).

=== Men's Singles ===
(Incomplete roll)

Year	Champions	Runners-up	Score
1887	(United States) T. Sterling Beckwith	(United States) Albert Empie Wright	2–1 sets.
1888	(United States) Henry Graff Trevor	(United States) T. Sterling Beckwith	3–2 sets.
1889	(United States) Oliver Samuel Campbell	(United States) Henry Graff Trevor	6–2, 6–3, 6–4.
1890	(United States) Oliver Samuel Campbell (2)	(United States) T. Sterling Beckwith	6-4 5-7 6-2 6-4
1891	(United States) Oliver Samuel Campbell (3)	(United States) Albert Empie Wright	10–8, 6–1, 7–5.
1892	(United Kingdom) Charles Walder Grinstead	(United States) Oliver Samuel Campbell	w.o.
1893	Not held		
1894	(United States) Oliver Samuel Campbell (4)	(United Kingdom) Charles Walder Grinstead	w.o.

=== Men's Doubles ===
(Incomplete roll)

Year	Champions	Runners-up	Score
1892	(United States) Albert Empie Wright (United States) J.W. Nichols	?	default.
