= Northwestern Championships =

North Western Championships

Defunct tennis tournament
- Tour: USNLTA Circuit (1888-1924), ILTF Circuit (1925-69)
- Founded: 1886; 139 years ago
- Abolished: 1969; 56 years ago
- Location: Various
- Venue: Various

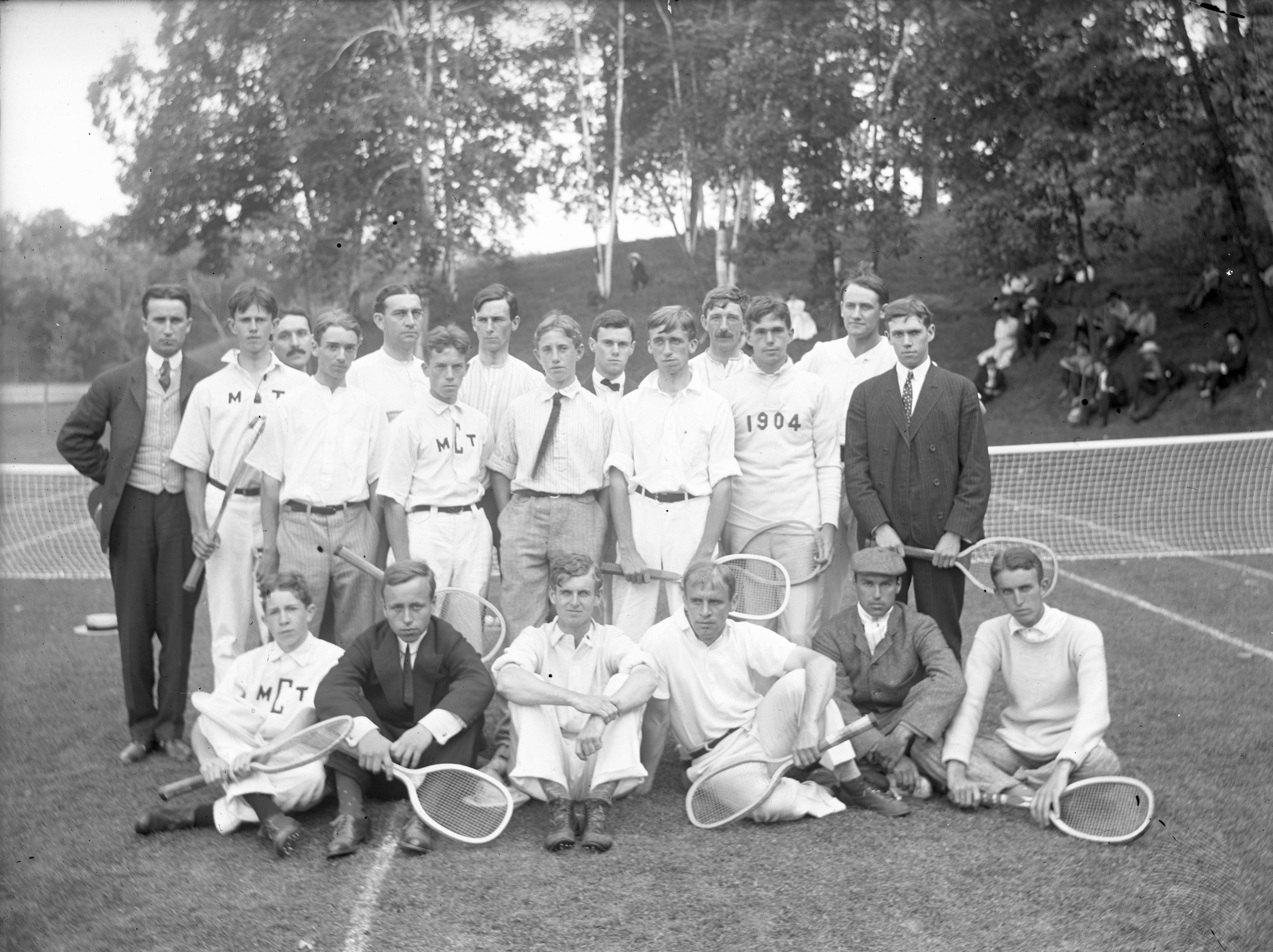
1904 tournament in Deephaven

The Northwestern Championships, also known as the North Western Lawn Tennis Association Championships, was an early men's and women's grass court tennis tournament founded in 1886. It was first played at the St. Paul Club, Saint Paul, Minnesota, in the United States. The tournament ran as part of ILTF Circuit until 1969.

== History ==
In 1884 the first St. Paul's Open lawn tennis tournament was held the St. Paul Club, Saint Paul, Minnesota that event evolved into a regional championship organized by the North Western Lawn Tennis Association in 1886 was staged at the St. Paul Club. The NWLTA included all tennis clubs in the states of Minnesota, Montana, North Dakota, and South Dakota. The tournament was also held in Deephaven, Minnesota. The championships ran annually as part of ILTF Circuit until 1969.
