= New England Championships =

Defunct tennis tournament
- Tour: USTA Circuit (1887–1912); ILTF Circuit (1913–1978)
- Founded: 1886; 139 years ago
- Abolished: 1978; 47 years ago
- Location: Various
- Surface: Grass

The New England Championships or New England Sectional Championships was a men's and women's open tennis tournament staged annually at various locations from 1886 until 1978.

== History ==
On 7 June 1886, the first Championships of New England were inaugurated at the New Haven Lawn Tennis Club in New Haven, Connecticut, United States, and the first men's champion was Henry Warner Slocum Jr..

In 1968 the final ladies championship was held that was won by the American player Shirley Fry-Irvin. The men's tournament continued to be played until 1978 which was won by the American player Ned Weld. The championships were played in New Haven from 1886 until 1903. In 1904 they moved to the Hartford Cricket Club Hartford, Connecticut almost exclusively for the rest of its annual run.

The championships were part of the USNLTA Circuit from 1886 until 1924. It became of part of the ILTF Circuit following the United States joining the International Lawn Tennis Federation in 1925 until 1978.

== Locations ==
The championships have been played in the following cities; Chestnut Hill, Hartford and New Haven and Newtown, Connecticut.
