= Englewood Invitation =

Defunct tennis tournament
- Tour: ILTF Circuit (1913–1968)
- Founded: 1887; 138 years ago
- Abolished: 1970; 55 years ago
- Location: Englewood, Bergen County, New Jersey, United States.
- Venue: Englewood Field Club
- Surface: Clay/Grass

The Englewoood Invitation (also known as the Englewood Open, the Englewood Field Club Invitational, and the Bergen County Open) was a men's and women's tennis tournament founded in 1887 played at the Englewood Field Club, Englewood, Bergen County, New Jersey, United States until 1970 when it was abolished.

== History ==
In 1887 the Englewood Field Club was founded. In August 1887, it staged the first Englewood Open as a clay court tennis tournament. In 1939 the tournament's name was changed to the Englewood Invitation and at which point the surface was switched to grass tennis courts. The tournament continued was annually until the event ended in 1970.

== Finals ==
=== Men's singles ===
(incomplete roll)

Englewood/Bergen County Open
Year	Winners	Runners-up	Score
↓ USNLTA Circuit ↓
1887	(United States) Oliver Samuel Campbell	(United States) Augustus Duryee	6–2, 7–5, 6–2
1888	(United States) Oliver Samuel Campbell (2)	(United States) Albert Empie Wright	6–2, 7–5, 4–6, 6–4
1889	(United States) Clarence Hobart	(United States) Carroll J. Post Jr.	7–5, 1–6, 6–1, 6–4
1890	(United States) Clarence Hobart (2)	(United States) Philip Shelton Sears	6–4, 5–7, 6–3, 6–1
1892	(United States) M.F. Prosser	(United States) Charles Kell	7–5, 9–7, 6–4
1907	(Canada) Frederick Anderson	(United States) Henry J. Mollenhauer	6–1, 3–6, 7–5, 6–3
1909	(United States) Karl Behr	(United States) Edward Larned	6–1, 6–4, 6–3
1909	(United States) Edward Larned	(Canada) Frederick Anderson	6–2, 6–3, 5–7, 6–4
1911	(United States) Karl Behr (2)	(United States) Bill Larned	11–9, 6–2, 6–4
↓ ILTF Circuit ↓
1927	(United States) Allen Behr	(United States) Percy Kynaston	9–7, 0–6, 6–4, 8–6
1928	(United States) Percy Kynaston	(Japan) Sadakazu Onda	6–3, 6–2, 7–5
1937	(Mexico) Ricardo Tapia	(Japan) Sadakazu Onda	6–4, 4–6, 6–3, 6–4
1938	(United States) Wayne Sabin	(United States) Martin Buxby	6–3, 6–4, 6–4
Englewood Invitation
1939	(United States) Wayne Sabin (2)	(Czechoslovakia) Ladislav Hecht	6–1, 6–4, 6–3
1940	(United States) Frank Bowden	(United States) Carlton Alexander Rood Jr	6–2, 2–6, 6–0
1950	(United States) George A. Ball	(United States) William (Bill) Lurie	6–3, 7–5, 6–2
1954	(United States) Calvin D. MacCracken	(United States) Larry Schaffer	6–4, 9–7, 4–6, 6–2
1955	(United States) Calvin D. MacCracken (2)	(United States) Reginald Weir	6–1, 6–1, 6–3
1956	(United States) Cliff Mayne	(Italy) Renato Gori	6–3, 6–2, 7–5
1957	(United States) Larry Schaffer	(United States) Robert M. (Bob) Barker	6–4, 6–4, 6–3
1958	(Italy) Renato Gori	(United States) Calvin D. MacCracken	8–6, 6–3, 6–2
1959	(Italy) Renato Gori (2)	(United States) Ronald Kerdasha	6–3, 6–2, 6–3
1960	(United States) Jim Hanlon	(United States) Ronald Kerdasha	6–4, 6–4, 6–3
↓ Open era ↓
1970	(United States) Steve Siegel	(United States) Warren Lucas	6–1, 6–3

=== Women's singles ===
(incomplete roll)

Englewood/Bergen County Open
Year	Winners	Runners-up	Score
1906	(United States) Marie Wagner	(United States) Miss Coffin	6–2, 5–7, 6–4
1907	(United States) Marie Wagner (2)	(United States) Eleanor Souther	6–3, 6–4
1912	(United States) Marie Wagner (3)	(United States) Helen McLean	7–5, 6–3
1918	(United States) Marion Zinderstein	(Norway) Anna Rogge	6–4, 6–2
1919	(United States) Marion Vanderhoef	(United States) Edith Sigourney	6–3, 6–3
1925	(United States) Molla Mallory	(United States) Helene Falk	6–1, 6–2
Englewood Invitation
1960	(United States) Martha MacCracken	(United States) Nancy Cross	6–1, 6–4
