= Gore Court Championships =

Defunct tennis tournament
- Founded: 1877; 148 years ago
- Abolished: 1926; 99 years ago
- Location: Sittingbourne, Kent, England
- Venue: Sittingbourne and Gore Court Archery & Lawn Tennis Club
- Surface: Grass

The Gore Court Championships was a men's and women's grass court tennis event established in 1877 that ran until at least 1926. The tournament was organised by the Sittingbourne and Gore Court Archery and Lawn Tennis Club and held at Gore Court a sports ground in Sittingbourne, Kent, England.

== History ==
The Sittingbourne and Gore Court Archery and Lawn Tennis club was founded in 1875. In 1877 it staged its first lawn tennis tournament. In 1882 a ladies's singles open event was staged won by a Miss Ray. In 1899 the men's singles title final featured the 1898 singles champion from the Natal Championships Charles Edward Finlason and Alfred Egerton Maynard Taylor, the match ended with them dividing the title The tournament was still being staged up to at least 1926, but then appears to have been abolished.

This short but popular tournament occasionally featured a women's singles event, but did regularly feature women's doubles and mixed doubles. Former winners of the gentleman's singles has included Ernest Wool Lewis, Wilberforce Eaves and Roy Allen.

== Venue ==
A description of the Sittingbourne and Gore Court Archery and Lawn Tennis that appeared in the Sittingbourne, Milton, and District Directory 1908 to 1909:

Gore Court Archery and Lawn Tennis Club. The headquarters and grounds of this old-established Club are situated at Gore Court Park, Sittingbourne. The ground is open for play each afternoon and evening during the summer months. An open lawn tennis tournament takes place in connection with the Club, generally the third week in August of each year..

— SITTINGBOURNE, Sittingbourne, Milton, and District Directory 1908/09, Reprinted 1980 by W.J. Parrett Ltd, Sittingbourne. ISBN 0-9507107-0-9

== Finals ==
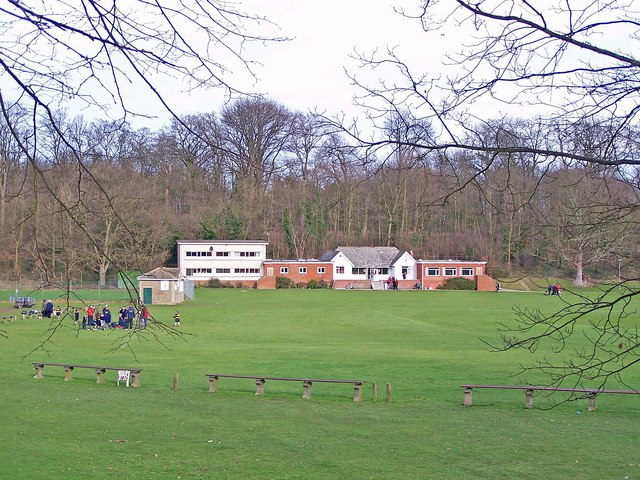
The Gore Court cricket grounds location of this tournament.

Incomplete Roll

=== Men's Singles ===
Included:

Year	Winner	Runner-up	Score
1881	(England) W.H. Patterson	(United Kingdom) J. Patterson	5-4 6-1
1882	(United Kingdom) J.R. Daniell	(United Kingdom) J. Langley	6-4, 6-4, 6-4
1883	(United Kingdom) H.S. Cooper	(United Kingdom) Rev. F. Greenfield	2 sets to 1
1884	(United Kingdom) C.C.J. Perry	(United Kingdom) C. Igglesden	6-,3 7-6, 6-4
1885	(England) Ernest Wool Lewis	(England) Ernest George Meers	6-1, 6-2
1886	(England) Ernest George Meers	(England) Charles Gladstone Eames	shared title
1887	(England) Ernest George Meers	(United Kingdom) Wilberforce Eaves	6-4,3-6, 6-3, 6-4
1888	(United Kingdom) Wilberforce Eaves	(United Kingdom) D. Fuller	5-6, 6-3, 6-5
1893	(United Kingdom) D. Fuller	(United Kingdom) L. Tuke	6-4, 8-6
1899	(South Africa) Charles Edward Finlason	(United Kingdom) Alfred Egerton Maynard Taylor	divided title
1901	(England) Roy Allen	(England) Archibald John McNair	w.o.
1903	(England) Roy Allen	(United Kingdom) Alfred Beamish	6-2, 6-0
