= Southern Championships =

Defunct tennis tournament
- Tour: ILTF Circuit (1913-1978)
- Founded: 1885; 141 years ago
- Abolished: 1978; 48 years ago
- Location: Various
- Surface: Clay/Grass

The Southern Championships also known as the Southern States Championships or Southern Sectional Championships was a men's and women's grass court then later clay tournament staged annually at various locations from 1885 until 1978. The tournament is still being held today as the USTA Southern Championships.

== History ==
In 1882 the Delaware Field Club in Willmington, Delaware, United States was founded, and officially incorporated in 1885. On 1 October 1885 the first Southern Championships were inaugurated at the venue, and the first men's champion was Charles Belmont Davis who later became an author.

A women's championship event was added to the schedule in 1901 and was held at the Bachelors Lawn Tennis Club, Washington D.C. which was won by Marion Jones In 1978 the final championships were played at Greenville, South Carolina that were then part of the official USTA southern circuit. The final men's champion was won by the Paraguayan player Francisco Gonzalez, the final ladies champion was Zenda Liess. The tournament was still being held in 1999 where it was known as the Southern Adult Clay Court Open.

== Locations ==
The championships have been played in the following cities; Atlanta, Georgia, Birmingham, Alabama, Jackson, Mississippi, Louisville, Kentucky, Memphis, Tennessee, New Orleans, Louisiana. Raleigh, North Carolina and Washington D.C., Wilmington, Delaware
