= County Dublin Championships =

Tennis tournament in Ireland

Tournament information
- Founded: 1887; 138 years ago}
- Location: Carrickmines; Republic of Ireland
- Venue: Lansdowne Lawn Tennis Club (1887-1894); Carrickmines Croquet and Lawn Tennis Club (1908-current)
- Surface: Grass, (outdoors)
- Website: County Dublin Championships

The County Dublin Championships also known as the County Dublin Open Tennis Championships is a combined men's and women's grass court tennis tournament founded in 1882 as the County Dublin Tournament in Lucan, Dublin for one edition only. In 1887 the tournament was revived at Lansdowne Lawn Tennis Club until 1894 only. In 1908 it was revived for the second time at the Carrickmines Croquet and Lawn Tennis Club, Carrickmines, Republic of Ireland where it is still played today.

== History ==
In 1882 a County Dublin Tournament was inaugurated at Lucan, Dublin which was a handicap event only then was discontinued. In 1887 a formal County Dublin Championships was established Lansdowne Lawn Tennis Club, Dublin, Ireland.Carrickmines Croquet & Lawn Tennis Club The championships were held for just eight editions until 1894 before being discontinued again. The tournament was not staged again from 1895 until 1907. In 1908 it was resumed at a new venue and location at the Carrickmines Croquet and Lawn Tennis Club, Carrickmines, County Dublin. The County Dublin Championships tournament is still held at the Carrickmines Croquet and Lawn Tennis Club every summer, usually during the week after Wimbledon.

== Venues ==
The Lansdowne Lawn Tennis Club was founded by Henry Dunlop in 1875 and was then known as the All Ireland Lawn Tennis Club, located in the rugby ground. In 1880 the club's name was changed to Lansdowne Lawn Tennis Club. It staged the tournament for eight years. In 1908 the championships were moved to the Carrickmines Croquet & Lawn Tennis Club where it is still played, the club's 18 tennis courts today consist of eight grass tennis courts, six synthetic grass courts, three indoor acrylic court and one clay court as well as two practice walls.
