= 1893 men's tennis season =

1893 Men's Tennis Season
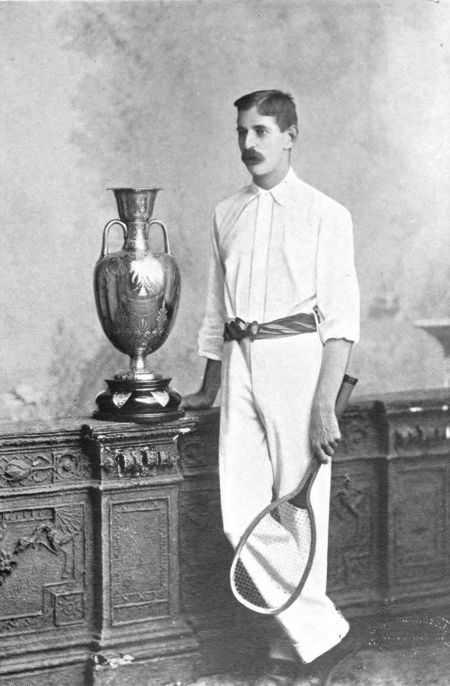
- Ireland's Joshua Pim wins three of the four major tournaments taking the Irish Championships, Northern Championships and Wimbledon Championships, and is title leader this season winning six out seven events.

Details
- Duration: 2 January – 29 December
- Edition: 18th
- Tournaments: 138

Achievements (singles)
- Most titles: (Ireland) Joshua Pim (6)
- Most finals: (United Kingdom) Roy Allen (10)

The 1893 Men's Tennis Season was a worldwide tennis circuit composed of 138 major, national, regional, provincial, state, county, metropolitan, city and regular tournaments.

The season began on 2 January in Cape Town, South Africa and ended on 29 December in Auckland, New Zealand.

== Season summary ==
The 1893 men's tennis season began on 2 January in Cape Town, South Africa with the Western Province Championships that was won by Edward Fuller.

At the end of April the British Covered Court Championships are played on indoor wood courts at Bayswater, London the event is won by Irelands Harold Mahony who defeated Englands Ernest Meers in straight sets.

Moving across the Irish Sea to the Dublin, Ireland to the Fitzwilliam Club, the seasons first major tournament kicks off on 22 May the mens singles final on 25 May is won by Irelands Joshua Pim who beats Englands Ernest Renshaw in four sets.

At the beginning of June the Welsh Championships held in Cardiff, Wales is won by Irelands George Ball-Greene who defeats Englands Arnold Blake in four sets in the mens singles final.

In mid-June the second major tournament of the season the Northern Championships is played at the Northern Lawn Tennis Club, Manchester, England. The mens singles final is an all Irish affair with Joshua Pim securing a second major title by beating Harold Mahony in four sets.

At the end of June the French Championships are held in Paris, France on clay courts the mens singles title is won by Laurent Riboulet who defeats compatriot Jean Schopfer in straight sets.

At the beginning of July the Pacific Coast Championships are staged in San Rafael, California and are played on cement courts, the mens singles title goes to Thomas Driscoll who beats Arthur Allen in the All Comers final, but holder William Taylor conceades a walkover to Driscoll.

In mid-July the third major tournament of the season the Wimbledon Championships played at the All England Club is won by Irelands Joshua Pim who collects a third consecutive major title by defeating Englands Wilfred Baddeley in four sets. This is Pim's fifth title of the season.

At the end of July the Canadian International Championships held in Toronto, Canada American Harry Avery defeats Canadian Henry Mackenzie in the All Comers, holder Fred Hovey is a no show in the challenge round Avery takes the title by a walkover.

Towards the very end of August the Championship of Germany is played in Hamburg, Germany Christian Winzer takes the singles title defeating Walter Bonne in four sets.

On 30 August at the final major tournament of the season in Newport, Rhode Island the U.S. National Championships is won by Bob Wrenn, this was Wrenn's fifth and final title of the year.

In October the Sydney Metropolitan Grass Court Championships are played in Sydney, Australia the singles event is won by Dudley Webb. On 29 December the 1893 season concludes at the New Zealand Championships played in Auckland, New Zealand with Minden Fenwick winning the singles event.

== Season results ==
Key

Tournaments
Major
National
Professional
Worldwide
Team

Surface
Clay – Outdoor (33)
Grass – Outdoor (91)
Hard – Outdoor (9)
Wood – Indoor (4)

Notes: Hard surfaces include asphalt, cement and concrete courts. The British LTA classified clay as a hard surface. RR denotes round robin tournament format.

=== January ===
Ended	Tournament	Winner	Finalist	Semifinalist	Quarterfinalist
8 Jan.	Western Province Championships; Cape Town, South Africa; Grass	(Cape Colony) Edward Fuller def. ?	(Cape Colony) Egbert Garcia		

=== February ===
Ended	Tournament	Winner	Finalist	Semifinalist	Quarterfinalist
25 Feb.	Southern California Midwinter Championships; Riverside, United States; Hard	(United States) Martin Chase def. ?	(United States) R. Gage		

=== March ===
Ended	Tournament	Winner	Finalist	Semifinalist	Quarterfinalist
3 Mar.	Marryatt Cup; Bombay, India; Grass	(United Kingdom) Wymond Symes def. ?	(United Kingdom) A.J. Brooks		
9 Mar.	Bengal Championships; Calcutta, India; Grass	(United Kingdom) Reginald Gamble; 6-3, 6-4, 4-6, 6-2	(United Kingdom) James Hechle		
11 Mar.	Southern India Championships; Madras, India; Clay	(United Kingdom) Charles H.J. Higginbotham; 6-2, 6-5	(United Kingdom) Arthur Hall		
18 Mar.	Bowral Championships; Bowral, Australia; Grass	(Australia) A. Freeman; 6-2, 6-4	(Australia) E. Nott		
19 Mar.	Ceylon Championships; Nuwara Eliya, Ceylon; Clay	(United Kingdom) Charles de Fonblanque; 3-6, 4-6, 6-4, 7-5, 6-2	(United Kingdom) Eustace Stephens		
25 Mar.	Otago LTA Tournament; Dunedin, New Zealand; Grass	(New Zealand) Andrew Borrows; 6-4, 12-10	(New Zealand) Ted Boddington		
25 Mar.	Punjab Championships; Lahore, India; Grass	(Scotland) Henry Fleming walkover	(United Kingdom) R. D. Spencer		
25 Mar.	Gulf Coast Championships; Tampa, United States; Hard	(United States) Bob Wrenn; 6-2, 6-2, 6-2	(United States) Albert Empie Wright		
30 Mar.	Magnolia Springs Open; Magnolia Springs, United States; Hard	(United States) Clarence Hobart; 6-3, 6-1, 6-3	(United States) Harry Avery		

=== April ===
Ended	Tournament	Winner	Finalist	Semifinalist	Quarterfinalist
3 Apr.	Tasmanian Championships; Launceston, Australia; Grass	(Australia) Arthur Miller; 6-5, 5-6, 6-4	(Australia) Audrey Caldecott		
4 Apr.	Geelong Easter Tournament; Geelong, Australia; Hard	(Australia) Gus Kearney; 6-1, 6-1, 6-1	(Australia) Herbert Webb		
15 Apr.	London Covered Court Championships; West Kensington, Grreat Britain; Wood (i)	(Ireland) Harold Mahony; 6-2, 0-6, 6-1	(United Kingdom) Horace Chapman		
20 Apr.	South Australian Championships; Adelaide, Australia; Hard	(Australia) David Harbison; 6-0, 6-2, 6-2	(Australia) John Baker		
22 Apr.	British Covered Court Championships; Bayswater, Great Britain; Wood (i)	(Ireland) Harold Mahony (2); 6-2, 6-2, 6-4	(United Kingdom) Ernest Meers		
24 Apr.	Buckley Trophy; Melbourne II, Australia; Grass	(Australia) Gus Kearney (2); 3-6, 0-6, 6-0, 6-1, 6-1	(Australia) Ben Green		
28 Apr.	Dublin University Championships; Dublin II, Ireland; Hard	(Ireland) T. Waller walkover	(Ireland) Tom Chaytor		

=== May ===
Ended	Tournament	Winner	Finalist	Semifinalist	Quarterfinalist
6 May.	Harvard University Championships; Cambridge MA, United States; Grass	(United States) Clarence Budlong; 10-8, 6-0, 6-4	(United States) Leo Ware		
6 May.	Yale University Championships; New Haven III, United States; Grass	(United States) F.A. Howard; 6-3, 7-5, 6-3	(United States) W. P. Sage		
6 May.	Fitzwilliam Club Championships; Dublin III, Country; Grass	(Ireland) Tom Chaytor def.	(Ireland) Grainger Chaytor		
13 May.	Danish National Championships; Copenhagen, Denmark; Clay	(Denmark) Folmer Hansen won	(Denmark) ?		
13 May.	Princeton University Championships; Princeton, United States; Grass	(United States) Samuel Garvey Thompson; 6-4, 5-7, 4-6, 6-4, 6-1	(United States) C. G. Colby		
21 May.	New South Wales Championships; Sydney, Australia; Grass	(Australia) Dudley Webb; 2-6, 5-7, 6-2, 6-3, 7-5	(Australia) Ben Greene		
21 May.	River Plate Championships; Buenos Aires, Argentina; Clay	(Argentina) Frank Still; 3-6, 6-4, 6-1	(Argentina) Thomas Knox		
24 May.	French Interscholastic Championships; Paris II, France; Clay	(France) André Vacherot; 4-6, 6-2, 9-7	(France) Georges Brosselin		
27 May.	Irish Championships; Dublin, Ireland; Grass	(Ireland) Joshua Pim; 6-1, 6-2, 4-6, 6-4	(United Kingdom) Ernest Renshaw		
27 May.	West of Scotland Championships; Pollokshields, Great Britain; Grass	(Scotland) Andrew Scott; 2-6, 4-6, 8-6, 9-7, 6-3	(Scotland) Thomas Hendry		
27 May.	Pollokshields Open; Pollokshields II, Great Britain; Grass	(Scotland) Henry Fleming (2); 6-4, 6-4, 9-7	(United Kingdom) Henry Caldecott		

=== June ===
Ended	Tournament	Winner	Finalist	Semifinalist	Quarterfinalist
3 Jun.	Hamburg Spring Tournament; Harvesthude, Germany; Clay	(German Empire) Walter Bonne; 6-1, 7-5	(Scotland) W. W. Gatliff		
3 Jun.	County Dublin Championships; Dublin IV, Ireland; Grass	(Ireland) Manliffe Goodbody; 6-3, 6-2, 7-5	(Ireland) Alexander Porter		
3 Jun.	Southern Championships; Baltimore, United States; Clay	(United States) Edward L. Hall; 6-4, 6-3, 6-2	(United States) Malcolm Chace		
4 June.	Whitehouse Open; Edinburgh, Great Britain; Clay	(Scotland) Henry Fleming (3) walkover	(United Kingdom) James Conyers		
6 Jun.	Racing Club de France Tournament; Paris III, France; Clay	(France) André Vacherot (2); 2-0 sets	(France) Maurice Cucheval-Clarigny		
8 Jun.	Welsh Championships; Penarth, Great Britain; Grass	(Ireland) George Ball-Greene; 7-5, 4-6, 9-7, 6-3	(United Kingdom) Arnold Blake		
9 Jun.	New England Championships; New Haven II, United States; Grass	(United States) Clarence Hobart (2); 6-3, 5-7, 3-6, 8-6, 6-4	(United States) Edward L. Hall		
10 Jun.	Stade Francais Cup; Paris IV, France; Clay	(France) André Lichtenberger; 6-5, retd.	(United Kingdom) Archdale Wickham		
10 Jun.	North of Ireland Championships; Belfast, Ireland; Grass	(Ireland) Manliffe Goodbody (2) walkover	(Ireland) Frank Stoker		
10 Jun.	Bradford Open; Bradford, Great Britain; Grass	(United Kingdom) Roy Allen; 6-1, 6-1, 6-1	(United Kingdom) Henry Starke-Jones		
10 Jun.	Middlesex Championships; Chiswick Park, Great Britain; Grass	(Ireland) Harold Mahony (3) walkover	(United Kingdom) Ernest Wool Lewis		
17 Jun.	Northern Championships; Manchester, Great Britain; Grass	(Ireland) Joshua Pim (2); 4-6, 6-3, 7-5, 6-2	(Ireland) Harold Mahony		
17 Jun.	Kent Open; Blackheath, Great Britain; Grass	(United Kingdom) Thomas Haydon; 1-6, 6-2, 3-6, 6-3, 7-5	(United Kingdom) Harold Nisbet		
18 Jun.	South African Championships; Port Elizabeth, South Africa; Clay	(South Africa) Walter Edmonds; 6-3, 6-3, 6-4	(South Africa) Andrew Richardson		
24 Jun.	Kent Championships; Beckenham, Great Britain; Grass	(United Kingdom) Harry S. Barlow; 2-6, 6-3, 6-1, 6-4	(United Kingdom) William Renshaw		
25 Jun.	French Championships; Paris, France; Clay	(France) Laurent Riboulet; 6-3, 6-3	(France) Jean Schopfer		
25 Jun.	Haarlem Tournament; Haarlem, Netherlands; Clay	(Netherlands) Louis Von Hemert; 2-6, 6-5, 6-1	(Netherlands) L. De Bree		
26 Jun.	Ilkley Open; Ilkley, Great Britain; Grass	(United Kingdom) David Davy; 6-3, 6-3, 10-12, 6-2	(United Kingdom) Charles Wade		
29 Jun.	Portland Park Open; Newcastle II, Great Britain; Grass	(United Kingdom) Charles G. Allen default	(United Kingdom) Roy Allen		
29 Jun.	Llandudno Open; Craigside II, Great Britain; Grass	(Ireland) Manliffe Goodbody (3); 1-6, 6-4, 6-3, 6-2	(Ireland) George Ball-Greene		
30 Jun.	Neighborhood Club Invitation; West Newton, United States; Clay	(United States) Fred Hovey; RR 6-2 matches	(United States) Bob Wrenn		

=== July ===
Ended	Tournament	Winner	Finalist	Semifinalist	Quarterfinalist
1 Jul.	Leicester Open; Leicester, Great Britain; Grass	(Ireland) Joshua Pim (3); 6-1, retd.	(United Kingdom) George Hillyard		
2 Jul.	Anglo Dutch Open; Rotterdam, Netherlands; Hard	(Netherlands) F. De Ranitz; 2-6, 6-5, 6-2	(Netherlands) Raymond Boeye		
2 Jul.	Rochester Open; Rochester, NY, United States; Grass	(United States) Fritz Ward; 6-4, 6-3, 6-3	(Canada) Robert Matthews		
2 Jul.	Waterloo Open; Waterloo, Great Britain; Grass	(United Kingdom) John Kay; 10-8, 3-6, 6-3, 4-6, 6-2	(United Kingdom) Andrew Mcfie		
2 Jul.	Middle States Championships; Mountain Station, United States; Grass	(United States) Richard Stevens; 6-3, 6-3, 6-2	(United States) Arthur Foote		
3 Jul.	Sheffield & Hallamshire Tournament; Sheffield, Great Britain; Grass	(Scotland) Henry Fleming (4); 6-4, 6-2, 3-6, 6-4	(United Kingdom) Roy Allen		
5 Jul.	Hyde Park Country Club Invitation; Kansas City, United States; Grass	(United States) Russell Whitman; 6-2, 6-3, 6-1	(United States) J. P. Meredith		
8 Jul.	Burton-on-Trent Open; Burton-on-Trent, Great Britain; Grass	(United Kingdom) Roy Allen (2) walkover	(United Kingdom) Charles G. Allen		
8 Jul.	London Championships; West Kensington II, Great Britain; Grass	(Ireland) Joshua Pim (4); 9-7, 1-6, 6-1, 6-8, 6-3	(Ireland) Harold Mahony		
8 Jul.	Pacific States Championships; San Rafael, United States; Hard	(United States) Thomas Driscoll walkover	(United States) William H. Taylor		
8 Jul.	Morton Challenge Cup; Morton, Great Britain; Grass	(Ireland) Manliffe Goodbody (4) def. ?	(United Kingdom) Charles Hatton		
9 Jul.	Tuxedo Cup; Tuxedo Park, United States; Grass	(United States) Clarence Hobart (3); 6-3, 6-3, 4-6, 6-3	(United States) Edward L. Hall		
14 Jul.	New York State Championships; Saratoga Springs, United States; Grass	(United States) Clarence Hobart (4); 3-6, 6-4, 8-6, 2-6, 6-4	(United States) Percy Knapp		
15 Jul.	Western States Championships; Evanston, United States; Grass	(United States) Samuel T. Chase; 6-3, 6-0, 6-4	(United States) Evarts Wrenn		
16 Jul.	Seabright Invitation; Rumson, United States; Grass	(United States) Bill Larned walkover	(United States) Richard Stevens		
16 Jul.	Nottinghamshire Open; Nottingham, Great Britain; Grass	(Scotland) Henry Fleming (5); 6-0, 6-4	(United Kingdom) David Davy		
16 Jul.	Western Pennsylvania Championships; Pittsburgh, United States; Clay	(United States) Thomas Ewing; 2-6, 6-3, 6-2, 6-4	(United States) Samuel Moorhead		
16 Jul.	Natal Championships; Pietermaritzburg, South Africa; Grass	(Colony of Natal) Herbert Millar def. ?	(Colony of Natal) Alfred Baker		
17 Jul.	Wimbledon Championships; Wimbledon, Great Britain; Grass	(Ireland) Joshua Pim (5); 3-6, 6-1, 6-3, 6-2	(United Kingdom) Wilfred Baddeley		
21 Jul.	Elmira Open; Elmira, United States; Clay	(United States) Fritz Ward (2); 6-2, 6-4, 6-3	(United States) Clinton Wyckoff		
22 Jul.	Manitoba Championships; Winnipeg, Canada; Grass	(Canada) Barney Toole walkover	(Canada) F. R. Goodwin		
22 Jul.	England v. Ireland International; London, England; Grass	(Ireland) Ireland; 4 -2 (matches)	England		
22 Jul.	Longwood Bowl; Boston, United States; Grass	(United States) Fred Hovey (2); 8-6, 7-5, 8-6	(United States) Richard Stevens		
25 Jul.	Essex Championships; Chingford, Great Britain; Grass	(United Kingdom) Herbert Yglesias default.	(United Kingdom) Arthur Gore		
26 Jul.	County Monaghan Championships; Clones, Ireland; Grass	(Ireland) William Parke; 3-6, 6-1, 7-5, 6-3	(Ireland) Lewis Hearn		
27 Jul.	Warwickshire Championships; Leamington Spa, Great Britain; Grass	(Ireland) Tom Chaytor (2); 6-2, 6-1, 6-8, 6-4	(United Kingdom) Percy Brown		
27 Jul.	Midland Counties Championships; Edgbaston, Great Britain; Grass	(United Kingdom) George Hillyard; 6-3, 6-1, 6-3	(United Kingdom) Henry Nadin		
28 Jul.	Canadian Championships; Toronto, Canada; Surface	(United States) Harry Avery walkover	(United States) Fred Hovey		
28 Jul.	Wentworth Open; New Castle, United States; Clay	(United States) Bob Wrenn; 7-5, 6-4, 6-2	(United States) Malcolm Chace		
30 Jul.	Hilversum International; Hilversum, Netherlands; Clay	(Netherlands) Raymond Boeye; 7-5, 6-2	(Netherlands) F. De Ranitz		
31 Jul.	Seaford & Blatchington Open; Seaford, Great Britain; Grass	(United Kingdom) E. J. Moffatt def. ?	(United Kingdom) C. H. Hands		

=== August ===
Ended	Tournament	Winner	Finalist	Semifinalist	Quarterfinalist
3 Aug.	Colchester Championship; Colchester, Great Britain; Grass	(United Kingdom) Roy Allen (3); 3-6, 6-2, 6-0, 6-3	(United Kingdom) Henry Knox		
3 Aug.	Rochester Open; Rochester, Great Britain; Grass	(United Kingdom) Wilberforce Eaves; 7-5, 4-6, 6-3	(United Kingdom) Roy Allen		
4 Aug.	Southampton Invitation; Southampton, United States; Grass	(United States) Bill Larned (2); 2-6, 6-3, 6-4, 6-0	(United States) Edward L. Hall		
5 Aug.	Northumberland Championships; Newcastle, Great Britain; Grass	(United Kingdom) William Renshaw; 6-2, 6-2, 2-6, 6-1	(Ireland) Tom Chaytor		
7 Aug.	Maine State Championships; Sorrento, United States; Grass	(United States) Bob Wrenn (3); 6-4, 6-2, 6-3	(United States) Malcolm Chace		
10 Aug.	Isle of Man Championships; Douglas, Isle of Man; Grass	(Isle of Man) F. L. Hobson def. ?	(Isle of Man) Horatio Callow		
10 Aug.	Nayack Open; Nayack, United States; Grass	(United States) William Orr Ludlow; 6-2, 6-3, 6-3	(United States) Henry Holt		
11 Aug.	Essex County Open; Manchester, Mass, United States; Clay	(United States) Malcolm Chace; RR (7-3 matches)	(United States) Bob Wrenn		
11 Aug.	Kebo Valley Open; Bar Harbor, United States; Clay	(United States) Valentine Gill Hall; 10-8, 6-4, 6-3	(United States) Gregory Bryan		
12 Aug.	Darlington Open; Darlington, Great Britain; Grass	(Ireland) Harold Mahony (4) walkover	(Ireland) Grainger Chaytor		
12 Aug.	Castle Wemyss Open; Wemyss Bay, Great Britain; Grass	(Ireland) Gerald Peacocke; 6-2, 6-4, 9-7	(United Kingdom) Arthur K. Cronin		
12 Aug.	East of England Championships; Felixstowe, Great Britain; Grass	(United Kingdom) Roy Allen (4); 6-1, 6-1	(United Kingdom) Herbert Kersey		
12 Aug.	Queensland Championships; Brisbane, Australia; Grass	(Australia) Ernest Hutton; 6-1, 6-4, 6-3	(Australia) John E. Gilligan		
12 Aug.	Stranraer Challenge Cup; Stranraer, Great Britain; Grass	(Ireland) Robert Pringle walkover	(United Kingdom) Leslie L. R. Hausburg		
12 Aug.	Inverkip Rovers Open; Wemyss Bay II, Great Britain; Grass	(Scotland) R. Harvey walkover	(United Kingdom) Henry G. Nadin		
12 Aug.	Exmouth Open; Exmouth, Great Britain; Grass	(United Kingdom) William Renshaw (2); 6-2, 6-4, 6-3	(United Kingdom) Harry Grove		
12 Aug.	North of Wales Open; Abergele, Great Britain; Grass	(United Kingdom) Sydney H. Smith; 10-8, 7-5, 8-10, 7-9, 6-0	(United Kingdom) Arnold Wolff		
15 Aug.	Maplewood Challenge Cup; Bethlehem, United States; Clay	(United States) William Milne def. ?	(United States) Charlie Denvers		
15 Aug.	Bar Harbor Open; Bar Harbor, United States; Clay	(United States) Bob Wrenn (4) def. ?	(United States) Gregory Bryan		
17 Aug.	Saxmundham Open; Saxmundham, Great Britain; Grass	(United Kingdom) G. Williams; 6-4, 6-1, 10-8	(United Kingdom) Roy Allen		
17 Aug.	Senter House Cup; Center Harbor, United States; Grass	(United States) J. Bertram Read def. ?	(United States) ? finalist		
18 Aug.	Narragansett Open; Narragansett, United States; Clay	(United States) Malcolm Chace (2); 6-4, 3-6, 6-8, 6-1, 6-0	(United States) Bill Larned		
18 Aug.	Inverkip Rovers Closed Championships; Wemyss Bay III, Great Britain; Grass	(Scotland) R. Harvey (2) def. ?	(Scotland) James Cleland Burns		
19 Aug.	Teignmouth Open; Teignmouth, Great Britain; Grass	(United Kingdom) Harry Grove; 6-2, 8-6	(Wales) Henry Davies		
19 Aug.	South of Scotland Championships; Moffat, Great Britain; Grass	(Scotland) Richard Millar Watson; 6-1, 6-1, 6-0	(United Kingdom) William Dunn		
19 Aug.	British Columbia Championships; Victoria, Canada; Grass	(Canada) Charles Longe; 6-0, 6-1, 6-3	(United States) Lancelot Pelly		
19 Aug.	South Wales Championships; Tenby, Great Britain; Grass	(Wales) F.H. Morris; 6-2, 4-6, 6-4, 6-2	(Wales) E.U. Davis		
19 Aug.	Derbyshire Championships; Buxton, Great Britain; Grass	(Ireland) Grainger Chaytor; 6-0, 6-2, 6-2	(United Kingdom) Ernest Crawley		
23 Aug.	The Hague Cup; Den Haag, Netherlands; Hard	(United Kingdom) Algernon Woulfe; 7-5, 6-1	(Netherlands) Landric De Bree		
24 Aug.	Maritime Provinces Championships; St. John, Canada; Grass	(Canada) W. R. Turnbull; 3-6, 6-1, 6-3, 6-1	(Canada) C. W. Clarke		
24 Aug.	Aldeburgh Open; Aldeburgh, Great Britain; Grass	(United Kingdom) Herbert Ransome; 7-5, 5-7, 6-1	(United Kingdom) Rupert Hamblin Smith		
25 Aug.	Southern California Championships; Santa Monica, United States; Hard	(United States) Robert Carter; 6-0, 6-2, 7-5	(United States) Martin Chase		
26 Aug.	Scottish Championships; St. Andrews, Great Britain; Grass	(United Kingdom) Arthur Gore; 6-3, 7-5, 4-6, 7-5	(Scotland) Richard Millar Watson		
26 Aug.	North of England Championships; Scarborough, Great Britain; Grass	(United Kingdom) William Renshaw (3); 6-2, 6-4, 6-4	(United Kingdom) Roy Allen		
26 Aug.	Pacific Northwest Championships; Tacoma, United States; Clay	(United States) J. C. Anderson; 2-6, 6-0, 7-5, 6-3	(Canada) J. F. Foulkes		
26 Aug.	Yorkshire County Championships; Ilkley, Great Britain; Grass	(Ireland) Joshua Pim (6); 3-6, 6-2, 6-3, 8-6	(Ireland) Harold Mahony		
26 August.	Taylor Challenge Cup; Scarborough II, Great Britain; Grass	(United Kingdom) William Renshaw (4); 6-3, 7-5, 6-3	(United Kingdom) Harry S. Barlow		
28 Aug.	Inter-State Amateur Tournament; Kansas City, United States; Clay	(United States) Russell Whitman def. ?	(United States) Ralph Condée		
28 Aug.	North Riding Championships; Whitby, Great Britain; Grass	(United Kingdom) Henry Caldecott; 6-3, 2-6, 6-2	(United Kingdom) Charles Wade		
29 Aug.	Championships of Hamburg; Hamburg II, Germany; Clay	(Germany) Ed Busch; 6-1, 2-6, 6-1, 6-0	(Germany) Walter Bonne		
29 Aug.	Championships of Germany; Hamburg, Germany; Clay	(Germany) Christian Winzer; 6-4, 6-0, 3-6, 6-3	(Germany) Walter Bonne		
30 Aug.	U.S. National Championships; Newport, R.I., United States; Grass	(United States) Bob Wrenn (5) walkover	(United States) Oliver Campbell		
30 Aug.	Gore Court Championships; Sittingbourne, Great Britain; Grass	(United Kingdom) D. Fuller; 6-4, 8-6	(United Kingdom) Leonard Tuke		

=== September ===
Ended	Tournament	Winner	Finalist	Semifinalist	Quarterfinalist
2 Sep.	Bournemouth Open; Bournemouth, Great Britain; Grass	(United Kingdom) Horace Champan; 7-5, 7-5, 7-5	(Ireland) Joshua Pim		
2 Sep.	West Sussex Challenge Cup; Chichester, Great Britain; Grass	(United Kingdom) Charles G. Allen (2) walkover	(United Kingdom) Roy Allen		
2 Sep.	North of Scotland Championships; Elgin, Great Britain; Clay	(Scotland) C.D. Murray; 6-3, 7-5	(United Kingdom) J. Rodger		
2 Sep.	Niagara International Championship; Niagara-on-the- Lake, Canada; Grass	(United States) Fritz Ward (3); 8-6, 2-6, 6-4, 6-0	(United States) Arthur Fuller		
3 Sep.	Missouri & Kansas Championships; Kansas City II, United States; Clay	(United States) Russell Whitman (2) def. ?	(United States) C.R. Rockwell		
3 Sep.	Divonne International; Divonne-les-Bains, France; Clay	(United Kingdom) T. A. White; 10-8, 6-2, 8-6	(United Kingdom) Archdale Wickham		
9 Sep.	Sussex Championships; Brighton, Great Britain; Grass	(United Kingdom) Wilfred Baddeley; 6-1, 1-6, 8-6, 6-2	(United Kingdom) Wilberforce Eaves		
10 Sep.	Dinard Cup; Dinard, France; Clay	(United Kingdom) Archdale Palmer; 3-6, 6-4, 0-6, 8-6, 6-3	(United Kingdom) Arthur Gore		
16 Sep.	South of England Championships; Eastbourne, Great Britain; Grass	(United Kingdom) Wilfred Baddeley (2); 7-5, 6-0, 6-1	(United Kingdom) Harry S. Barlow		
25 Sep.	Boulogne International Championship; Boulogne-sur-Mer, France; Clay	(United Kingdom) Wilberforce Eaves (2); 1-6, 6-1, 6-4, 9-7	(United Kingdom) Roy Allen		

=== October ===
Ended	Tournament	Winner	Finalist	Semifinalist	Quarterfinalist
6 Oct.	U.S. Intercollegiate Championships; New Haven, United States; Grass	(United States) Malcolm Chace (3); 6-3, 6-2, 6-3	(United States) Arthur Foote		
14 Oct.	Metropolitan Championship of Sydney; Sydney, Australia; Hard	(Australia) Dudley Webb; 7-5, 6-0	(Australia) Septimus Noble		
20 Oct.	Welsh Covered Court Championships; Craigside, Great Britain; Wood (i)	(United Kingdom) James Crispe; 6-2, 6-4, 6-2	(United Kingdom) Tancred Cummins		

=== November ===
Ended	Tournament	Winner	Finalist	Semifinalist	Quarterfinalist
24 Nov.	Victorian Championships; Melbourne, Australia; Grass	(Australia) Ben Green; 8-6, 6-4, 6-2	(Australia) Archibald Windeyer		

=== December ===
Ended	Tournament	Winner	Finalist	Semifinalist	Quarterfinalist
29 December.	New Zealand Championships; Auckland, New Zealand; Grass	(New Zealand) Minden Fenwick; 1-6, 6-3, 6-4, 6-3	(New Zealand) Patrick Marshall		

== Tournament winners ==
Players listed by most titles won major tournaments are in bold.

- (Ireland) Joshua Pim, Ilkley, **Irish Championships**, Leicester, **Northern Championships**, West Kensington II, **Wimbledon Championships**, (6)
- (United States) Bob Wrenn, Bar Harbor, New Castle, Sorrento, Tampa, **U.S. National Championships** (5)
- (Scotland) Henry Fleming, Edinburgh, Lahore, Nottingham, Pollokshields II, Sheffield, (5)
- (United States) Clarence Hobart, Magnolia Springs, New Haven II, Saratoga Springs, Tuxedo Park, (4)
- (United Kingdom) William Renshaw, Exmouth, Newcastle, Scarborough, Scarborough II, (4)
- (Ireland) Harold Mahony, Bayswater, Chiswick Park, Darlington, West Kensington, (4)
- (United Kingdom) Roy Allen, Bradford, Burton-on-Trent, Colchester, Felixstowe, (4)
- (Ireland) Manliffe Goodbody, Belfast, Craigside II, Dublin IV, Morton, (4)
- (United States) Malcolm Chace, Manchester, Mass, Narragansett, New Haven, (3)
- (United States) Fritz Ward, Elmira, Niagara-on-the-Lake, Rochester, NY, (3)
- (France) André Vacherot, Paris II, Paris III, (2)
- (Australia) Gus Kearney, Geelong, Melbourne II, (2)
- (United States) Bill Larned, Rumson, Southampton, (2)
- (Scotland) R. Harvey, Wemyss Bay II, Wemyss Bay III, (2)
- (United Kingdom) Charles Gladstone Allen, Chichester, Newcastle II, (2)
- (United States) Fred Hovey, Boston, West Newton, (2)
- (United States) Russell Whitman, Kansas City, Kansas City II, (2)
- (United Kingdom) Wilfred Baddeley, Brighton, Eastbourne, (2)
- (United Kingdom) Wilberforce Eaves, Boulogne-sur-Mer, Rochester, (2)

81 other players won a single title each. (1)

== See also ==
- 1893 women's tennis season

== Sources ==
- British Newspaper Archive
- California Digital Newspaper Collection
- Google News Archive
- Robertson, Max (1974). The Encyclopedia of Tennis. New York and London: Viking Press. ISBN 978-0-670-29408-4.
- Trove
- Whittelsey, Joseph T. (1894). Wright and Ditson Lawn Tennis Guide. Boston: Wright and Ditson Publishers.

== External sources ==
- 1894 Wright and Ditson Lawn Tennis Guide. 1893 Results.
- Tennis Archives/Tournaments/1893 /Search
