= 1891 women's tennis season =

Women's tennis tournament series

1891 Women's Tennis Season
Details
- Duration: 2 January – 31 December
- Edition: 16th
- Tournaments: 80
- Categories: Major (4); National (9); Great Britain & Ireland (32); United States (14); Australasia (9); Canada (3); India & Ceylon (2); Europe (4); South Africa (2); South East Asia (2)

Achievements (singles)
- Most titles: (United Kingdom) Maud Shackle (7)
- Most finals: (United Kingdom) Maud Shackle (7)

The 1891 Women's Tennis Season was a worldwide tennis circuit composed of 80 major, national, regional, provincial, state, county, metropolitan, city and regular tournaments.

The season began in January in Christchurch, New Zealand, and ended in December, in Napier, New Zealand.

== Season summary ==
The season began in late December 1890 in Christchurch, New Zealand with the New Zealand Championships that ended on 2 January 1891.

At the first major tournament of the season the Irish Championships held in late May in Dublin, Ireland the women's singles event was won by Louisa Martin who defeated compatriot Florence Stanuell, in three sets.

The second major tournament of the season that concluded on 20 June, was the Northern Championships held in Manchester, England the singles event is won by Irish player Florence Stanuell marking her second consecutive major final appearance won the event by English player Mary Steedman conceding a walkover in the challenge round.

Moving across the Atlantic to the United States where the third major tournament of year the 1891 U.S. National Championships held at the end of June in Philadelphia, the women's singles title went to Irelands Mabel Cahill who beat the American player Ellen Roosevelt in four sets.

At the final and fourth major event the 1891 Wimbledon Championships early July, the women's singles title was won by Lottie Dod against her regular adversary Blanche Hillyard in straight sets.

The season ended in late December 1891 with a second edition of the New Zealand Lawn Tennis Association Championships being staged in Napier, New Zealand.

== Season results ==
Key

Major events
National events
Professional events
Worldwide events

=== January ===
Ended	Tournament	Winner	Finalist	Semifinalist	Quarterfinalist
2 Jan.	New Zealand Championships; Christchurch, New Zealand; Grass	(New Zealand) Isabel Rees; 6-3, 4–6, 6-5	(New Zealand) E. Gordon		
20 Jan.	Hôtel Prince of Wales Ladies Cup; Cannes, France; Clay	(United Kingdom) Cordelia Grant def.	(France) Louise Roux		
25 Jan.	Southern India Championships; Madras, India; Clay	(United Kingdom) Mrs Fortune; 6-4, 4–6, 6-0	(United Kingdom) Mrs B. Foote		

=== February ===
Ended	Tournament	Winner	Finalist	Semifinalist	Quarterfinalist
14 Feb.	Linwood Closed Ladies Tournament; Christchurch II, New Zealand; Grass	(New Zealand) Mrs W. J. Blyth; 6-2, 6-2	(New Zealand) Miss Simpson		

=== March ===
Ended	Tournament	Winner	Finalist	Semifinalist	Quarterfinalist
7 Mar.	Berea Ladies Open; Durban, South Africa; Clay	(Colony of Natal) Mabel Grant; 6-0, 6-0	(Colony of Natal) Miss McNeil		
7 Mar.	Los Angeles TC Open; Los Angeles, United States; Cement	(United States) F. Halsted def.	(United States) Fannie Shoemaker		
14 Mar.	South Australian Championships; Adelaide, Australia; Cement	(Australia) Emily Hodge; 11-6 games	(Australia) Marion Hodge		
15 Mar.	Otago LTA Tournament; Dunedin, New Zealand; Grass	(New Zealand) Ruth Orbell; 8-5 games	(New Zealand) G. Rattray		
18 Mar.	Ceylon Championships; Nuwara Eliya, Ceylon; Clay	(United Kingdom) Annette de Fonblanque; 4-6, 13–11, 6-2	(British Ceylon) N. de Saram		
18 Mar.	Auckland Championships; Auckland, New Zealand; Grass	(New Zealand) Miss Mowbry; 7-5, 7-5	(New Zealand) Miss Spiers		
28 Mar.	Linwood Open; Christchurch III, New Zealand; Grass	(New Zealand) Miss Griffith; 6-4, 4–6, 6-5	(Netherlands) E. van Asch		
28 Mar.	South African Championships; Port Elizabeth, South Africa; Clay	(Colony of Natal) Mabel Grant (2); 6-0, 6-2	(Cape Colony) Miss Blackburn		

=== April ===
Ended	Tournament	Winner	Finalist	Semifinalist	Quarterfinalist
11 April.	British Covered Court Championships; West Kensington, Great Britain; Wood (i)	(United Kingdom) Maud Shackle; 7-5, 6-3	(United Kingdom) May Jacks		

=== May ===
Ended	Tournament	Winner	Finalist	Semifinalist	Quarterfinalist
2 May.	Singapore LLTC Spring Open; Singapore, Colony of Singapore; Grass	(Singapore in the Straits Settlements) Miss Wood; 6-0, 6-3	(Singapore in the Straits Settlements) M. Keasberry		
16 May.	New South Wales Championships; Sydney, Australia; Surface	(Australia) S. Dransfield; 3-6, 6–1, 6-3	(Australia) L. Blaxland		
28 May.	Lenox TC Ladies Invitation; Harlem, United States; Grass	(United States) Miss Beyea; 4-6, 6–1, 6-3	(United States) Miss Underhill		
30 May.	Irish Championships; Dublin, Ireland; Grass	(Ireland) Louisa Martin; 6-2, 5–7, 6-0	(Ireland) Florence Stanuell		

=== June ===
Ended	Tournament	Winner	Finalist	Semifinalist	Quarterfinalist
1 Jun.	5th Av. TC Ladies Spring Tournament; Manhattan, United States; Grass	(United States) Kittie Millette; 6-4, 6-3	(United States) Miss Corey		
6 Jun.	Whitehouse Open; Edinburgh II, Great Britain; Clay	(Scotland) Lottie Paterson; 7-5, 6-2	(United Kingdom) Jane Corder		
7 Jun.	West of England Championships; Bath, Great Britain; Grass	(United Kingdom) Nora Pope; 6-0, 7-5	(United Kingdom) Mary Agg		
11 Jun.	Harvard Annex Ladies Tournament; Cambridge, MA, United States; Grass	(United States) Miss Whittlesey; 6-4, 6-2	(United States) Miss Carrett		
12 Jun.	Welsh Championships; Cardiff, Great Britain; Grass	(United Kingdom) Nora Pope (2); 6-0, 7-5	(United Kingdom) Mary Agg		
12 Jun.	Orange Spring Open; Montrose, NJ, United States; Grass	(Ireland) Mabel Cahill; 7-5, 7-5	(United States) Emma Fellowes-Morgan		
12 Jun.	Scottish Championships; Edinburgh, Great Britain; Grass	(United Kingdom) Helen Jackson; 6-0, 6-1	(United Kingdom) Jane Corder		
13 Jun.	Cheltenham Open; Cheltenham II, Great Britain; Grass	(United Kingdom) Maud Shackle (2); 6-2, 6-1	(United Kingdom) G Leeds-Paine		
13 Jun.	Cheltenham Championships; Cheltenham, Great Britain; Grass	(United Kingdom) Nora Pope (3); 6-2, 6-2	(United Kingdom) Florence Mardall		
20 Jun.	Kent Championships; Beckenham, Great Britain; Grass	(United Kingdom) Maud Shackle (3); 6-4, 6-0	(United Kingdom) May Jacks		
20 June.	Northern Championships; Manchester, Great Britain; Grass	(Ireland) Florence Stanuell walkover	(United Kingdom) Mary Steedman		
24 Jun.	Championship of Nebraska; Hastings, United States; Grass	(United States) Louise Pound won	(United States) finalist ?		
27 Jun.	Headingley Open; Headingley II, Great Britain; Grass	(United Kingdom) Helen Jackson (2); 6-1, 7-5	(United Kingdom) Beatrice Wood		
27 June.	Kent County Championships; Blackheath, Great Britain; Grass	(United Kingdom) Mary Hutchinson; 6-2, 3–6, 10-8	(United Kingdom) Amy Wilson		
27 Jun.	U.S. National Championships; Philadelphia, United States; Surface	(Ireland) Mabel Cahill (2); 6-4, 6–1, 4–6, 6-3	(United States) Ellen Roosevelt		

=== July ===
Ended	Tournament	Winner	Finalist	Semifinalist	Quarterfinalist
3 Jul.	Bayview Open; Bayonne, United States; Clay	(United States) H. Ogden; 6-2, 4–6, 6-3	(United States) Miss Dally		
4 Jul.	Yorkshire Association & County Open; Headingley, Great Britain; Grass	(United Kingdom) Helen Jackson (3); 6-4, 4–6, 6-3	(United Kingdom) Beatrice Wood		
9 Jul.	Wimbledon Championships; Wimbledon, Great Britain; Grass	(United Kingdom) Lottie Dod; 6-2, 6-1	(United Kingdom) Blanche Hillyard		
11 Jul.	Capitol Hill Tournament; Washington DC, United States; Grass	(United States) Miss Ward; 6-8 7-5 postponed.	(United States) M. Hall		
18 Jul.	London Championships; West Kensington II, Great Britain; Grass	(United Kingdom) Maud Shackle (4); 6-2, 4–6, 6-3	(United Kingdom) May Jacks		
18 Jul.	Nottinghamshire LTA Tournament; Nottingham, Great Britain; Grass	(United Kingdom) M. Evans; 4-6, 6–2, 6-2	(United Kingdom) Nora Pope		
18 Jul.	New York State Championships; Saratoga Springs, United States; Grass	(United States) Annie Ritchie; 6-3, 6-0	(United States) Miss Ingram		
18 Jul.	Hull Westbourne Av. Open; Hull, Great Britain; Grass	(United Kingdom) C. Crosby default	(United Kingdom) G. Harrison		
18 Jul.	Ealing Championships; Ealing, Great Britain; Grass	(United Kingdom) Charlotte Cooper def.	(United Kingdom) Alice Brown		
21 Jul.	Natal Championships; Pietermaritzburg, Natal; Clay	(Colony of Natal) Mabel Grant (3); 6-1, 6-0	(Colony of Natal) L. Button		
24 Jul.	Queen's Cup; West Kensington III, Great Britain; Grass	(United Kingdom) Maud Shackle (5); 2-6, 6–2, 6-0	(United Kingdom) Ruth Legh		
25 Jul.	Middlesex Championships; Chiswick Park, Great Britain; Surface	(United Kingdom) Maud Shackle (6) walkover	(United Kingdom) Mary Steedman Vane		
25 Jul.	Edgbaston Open; Edgbaston,II Great Britain; Surface	(United Kingdom) Alice Pickering; 6-1, 6-3	(United Kingdom) Miss Wills		
25 Jul.	Warwickshire Championships; Leamington Spa, Great Britain; Grass	(United Kingdom) Nora Pope (4); 6-1, 6-4	(United Kingdom) E. Wheildon		

=== August ===
Ended	Tournament	Winner	Finalist	Semifinalist	Quarterfinalist
1 Aug.	Northumberland Championships; Newcastle, Great Britain; Grass	(United Kingdom) Helen Jackson (4); 6-2, 6-4	(United Kingdom) Florence Thompson		
5 Aug.	Scheveningen International; Scheveningen, Netherlands; Clay	(Netherlands) E. van Aken; 6-1, 6-3	(Netherlands) Miss Van Sittert		
6 Aug.	Colchester Championship; Colchester, Great Britain; Grass	(United Kingdom) Agnes Morton; 6-2, 6-1	(United Kingdom) Winifred Kersey		
8 Aug.	Isle of Man Championships; Douglas, Isle of Man; Grass	(Isle of Man) Nelly Darrah; 7-5, 9-7	(Isle of Man) Lilla Ferrier		
8 Aug.	Exmouth Open; Exmouth, Great Britain; Grass	(Wales) Edith Austin; 6-3, 9-7	(Ireland) Lilian Pine-Coffin		
8 Aug.	Sheffield & Hallamshire Tournament; Sheffield, Great Britain; Grass	(United Kingdom) Beatrice Wood; 6-3, 6-3	(United Kingdom) Agnes Watts		
8 Aug.	West of Scotland Championships; Inverkip, Great Britain; Grass	(Scotland) Miss Moir; 6-4, 6-1	(United Kingdom) Ruth Templeton		
11 Aug.	Transvaal Championships; Johannesburg, South Africa; Clay	(Colony of Natal) Mabel Grant (4); 6-1, 6-0	(South African Republic) Miss Marais		
13 Aug.	Derbyshire Championships; Buxton, Great Britain; Surface	(United Kingdom) May Marriott; 6-2, 6-2	(United Kingdom) Beatrice Wood		
15 Aug.	Teignmouth Open; Teignmouth, Great Britain; Surface	(United Kingdom) Violet Pinckney; 3-6,7-5, 6-4	(Ireland) Lilian Pine-Coffin		
15 Aug.	Championship of the Coast; Redondo Beach, United States; Asphalt	(United States) F. Gilliland; 6-3, 0–6, 6-3	(United States) Fannie Shoemaker		
15.Aug.	Eastern Counties Championships; Felixstowe, Great Britain; Grass	(United Kingdom) Winifred Kersey; 6-4, 6-2	(United Kingdom) Constance Tidbury		
17.Aug	South of Scotland Championships; Moffat, Great Britain; Grass	(United Kingdom) Jane Corder; 6-4, 6-1	(United Kingdom) Evelyn Blencowe		
20 Aug.	Saxmundham Open; Saxmundham, Great Britain; Grass	(United Kingdom) Winifred Kersey (2); 6-2, 4–6, 6-2	(United Kingdom) May Carter		
21 Aug.	Maritime Provinces Championships; St John, Canada; Clay	(Canada) Miss MacLaren; 6-2, 6-3	(Canada) Mrs McCleod		
22.Aug.	East of Scotland Championships; St Andrews, Great Britain; Grass	(United Kingdom) Jane Corder (2); 6-4, 4–6, 6-4	(Scotland) Miss Moir		
22 Aug.	Queensland Championships; Brisbane, Australia; Grass	(Australia) Miss Lee; 7-5, 6-2	(Australia) May Quinnell		
22 Aug.	North of England Championships; Scarborough, Great Britain; Grass	(United Kingdom) Helen Jackson (5); 6-3, 6-1	(United Kingdom) Nora Pope		
24 Aug.	British Columbia Championships; Victoria, Canada; Grass	(Canada) Florence Barkley; 3-6, 6–4, 6-4	(Canada) Anastasia Musgrave		
25 Aug.	Dieppe International Championship; Dieppe, France; Clay	(United Kingdom) Constance Bryant def.	(Germany) Miss Zoerb		
29 Aug.	Aldeburgh Open; Aldeburgh, Great Britain; Grass	(United Kingdom) May Lowther; 6-4, 0–6, 6-4	(United Kingdom) May Carter		
29 Aug.	Bournemouth Open; Bournemouth, Great Britain; Grass	(United Kingdom) Violet Pinckney (2) default	(United Kingdom) Elsie Pinckney		
30 Aug.	Netherlands National Championships; Scheveningen, Netherlands; Clay	(Netherlands) E. van Aken (2); 6-3, 6-1	(Netherlands) Mej. M. Bol		
30 Aug.	Manitoba & Northwestern Championships; Winnipeg, Canada; Grass	(Canada) Miss Burch; 6-2, 6-3	(Canada) K. Beckett		
30 Aug.	San Diego Ladies Tournament; San Diego, United States; Asphalt	(United States) Belle Stewart def.	(United States) Imogene Ludlow		

=== September ===
Ended	Tournament	Winner	Finalist	Semifinalist	Quarterfinalist
4 Sep.	Sussex Championships; Brighton, Great Britain; Grass	(United Kingdom) Maud Shackle (7); 6-4, 5–7, 6-2	(Ireland) May Langrishe		
12 Sep.	Pacific Coast Championships; San Rafael, United States; Asphalt	(United States) Bertha Crouch walkover	(United States) Maud Wilkinson		
12 Sep.	South of England Championships; Eastbourne, Great Britain; Grass	(United Kingdom) Blanche Hillyard; 2-6, 7–5, 6-0	(Ireland) May Langrishe		
18 Sep.	Philadelphia & District Championships; West Philadelphia, United States; Grass	(Ireland) Mabel Cahill (3) def.	(United States) finalist		
18 Sep.	Staten Island Ladies Club Open; Livingston, United States; Grass	(United States) Annie Burdette; 6-1, 6-1	(United States) Grace Roosevelt		
19 Sep.	Boulogne International Championship; Boulogne-sur-Mer, France; Clay	(United Kingdom) May Arbuthnot; 6-3, 7–9, 6-3	(United Kingdom) Constance Smith		
24 Sep.	Orange Fall Open; Montrose II, United States; Grass	(United States) Fannie Campbell; 6-4, 4–6, 6-3	(United States) Lilly Campbell		

=== October ===
No events

=== November ===
Ended	Tournament	Winner	Finalist	Semifinalist	Quarterfinalist
14 Nov.	Victorian Championships; Melbourne, Australia; Asphalt	(Australia) Ellen Mayne; 6-5, 6-4	(Australia) Phenie Shaw		
20 Nov.	Singapore LLTC Autumn Open; Singapore II, Straits Settlement; Grass	(Singapore in the Straits Settlements) Mrs Salzmann; 6-1, 6-4	(Singapore in the Straits Settlements) Mrs Chaytor		

=== December ===
Ended	Tournament	Winner	Finalist	Semifinalist	Quarterfinalist
31 Dec.	New Zealand Championships (2nd Ed); Napier, New Zealand; Grass	(New Zealand) Nina Douslin; 3-6, 6–2, 7-5	(New Zealand) Constance Abraham		

== Season statistics ==
- Total Tournaments (80)
- Most Major titles: 4 players each won (1)
- Most Major finals: (Ireland) Florence Stanuell (2)
- Most titles: (United Kingdom) Maud Shackle (7)
- Most finals: (United Kingdom) Maud Shackle (7)

== See also ==
- 1891 men's tennis season
