= Riboulet =

Riboulet is a French surname. Notable people with the surname include:

- Laurent Riboulet (1871–1960), French tennis player
- Louis Riboulet (1871–1944), French pedagogue, writer, and professor
- Mathieu Riboulet (born 1960), French writer and film director
