= Saint-Alban-d'Ay =

- Commune
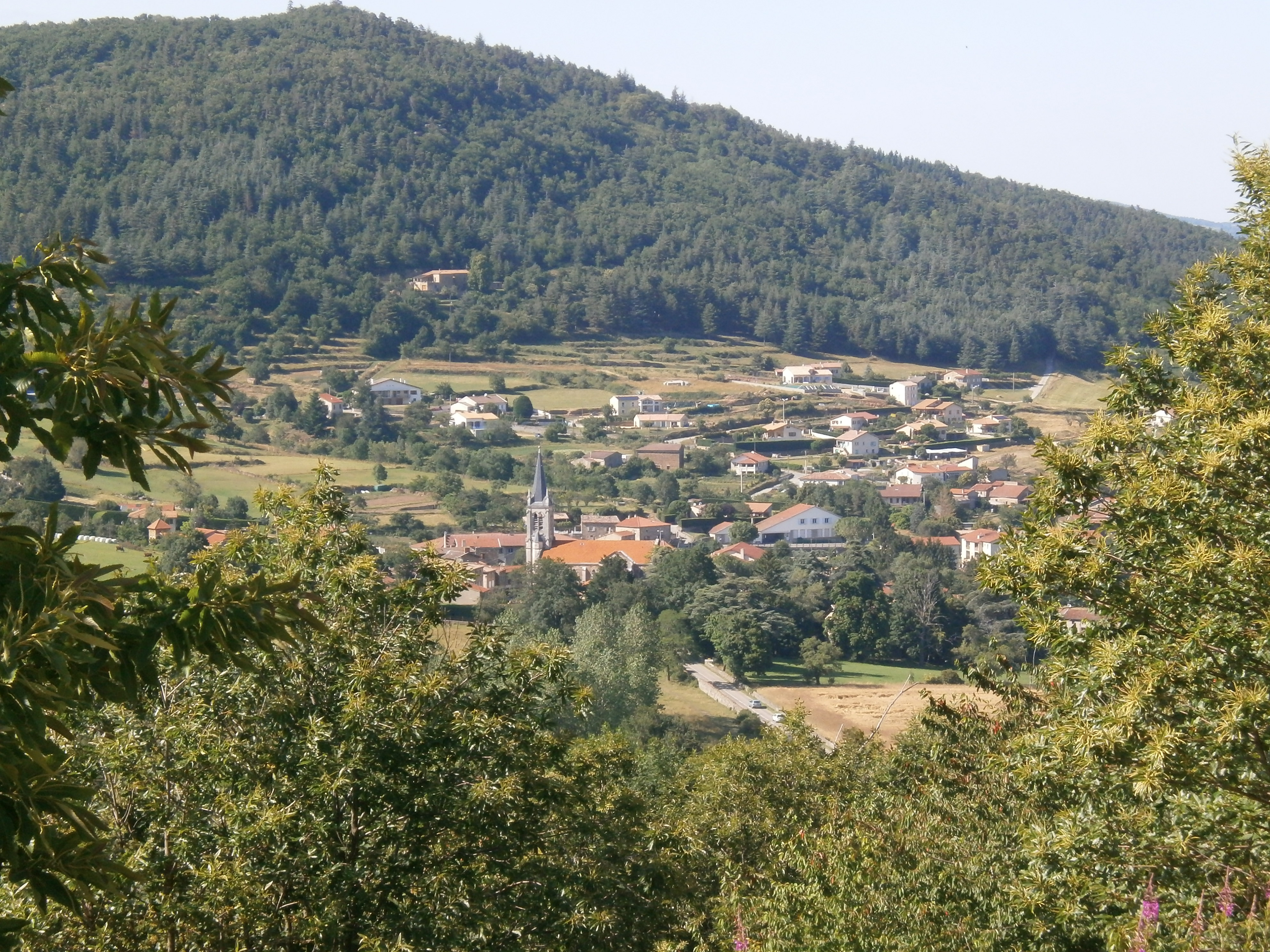
- A general view of Saint-Alban-d'Ay
- Location of Saint-Alban-d'Ay
- Location within France Location within Auvergne-Rhône-Alpes
- Coordinates: 45°11′19″N 4°38′20″E
- Country: France
- Region: Auvergne-Rhône-Alpes
- Department: Ardèche
- Arrondissement: Tournon-sur-Rhône
- Canton: Haut-Vivarais
- Intercommunality: Val d'Ay

Government
  - Mayor (2020–2026): André Ferrand
- Area^{1}: 23.73 km^{2} (9.16 sq mi)
- Highest elevation: 1,181 m (3,875 ft)
- Lowest elevation: 369 m (1,211 ft)
- Population (2023): 1,384
  - Density: 58.32/km^{2} (151.1/sq mi)
- Time zone: UTC+01:00 (CET)
  - Summer (DST): UTC+02:00 (CEST)
- INSEE/Postal code: 07205 /07790
- ^{1} French Land Register data, which excludes lakes, ponds, glaciers > 1 km^{2} (0.386 sq mi or 247 acres) and river estuaries.

Saint-Alban-d'Ay (French pronunciation: [sɛ̃.t‿albɑ̃ dɛ]; Occitan: Sant Alban d'Ai) is a commune in the Ardèche department in southern France.

== See also ==
- Communes of the Ardèche department
- Louis Riboulet
