= Charles Gladstone Allen =

British tennis player (1868–1924)

Charles Allen
- Full name: Charles Gladstone Allen
- Country (sports): United Kingdom
- Born: 28 December 1868; Saint Neots, Bedfordshire, England
- Died: 21 December 1924 (Age 56); Prestbury, Gloucestershire, England
- Turned pro: 1887 (amateur tour)
- Retired: 1914

Singles
- Career record: 414/273 (60.2%)
- Career titles: 8

Grand Slam singles results
- Wimbledon: 2R (1896), (1899)

Doubles

Grand Slam doubles results
- Wimbledon: F (1896) QF (1899)

Charles Gladstone Allen (1868–1924) was a British tennis player in the early years of Wimbledon. He was an all comers finalist at 1896 Wimbledon Championships in the men's doubles event partnering with his brother Roy Allen, where they lost to Reginald Doherty and Harold Nisbet. He was active from 1887 to 1914 and contested 17 career finals in singles and won 8 titles.

== Career ==
Charles played his first event at the 1887 Stevenage LTC Tournament where he reached the quarter-finals. In 1890 he won his first singles title in Saxmundham LTC Tournament (later known as the Suffolk Championships) against his twin brother Roy Allen.

He was a semi finalist at the Northern Championships in 1893, then considered the third most important tournament in the world at that time, and a quarter finalist at the Irish Championships in 1895. At the 1896 Wimbledon Championships he reached the all comers final of the men's doubles event partnered with his brother Roy Allen, but were defeated by Reginald Doherty and Harold Nisbet.

In 1898 won his last singles title at the Boulogne International Championship held at the Tennis Club Boulogne Sur Mer, Boulogne-sur-Mer, France on clay courts. In 1914 he played his final tournament at the Monte Carlo Championships held at La Condamine, Monaco (known today as the Monte Carlo Masters)

His career singles highlights include winning the Saxmundham Open two times (1890–1891), the Bradford Open two times (1893, 1897), the Eastern Counties Championships (1890), the Chichester Open (1893), the Craigside LTC Tournament at Edinburgh (1896) and the Boulogne International Tournament (1898).

Additionally he was also a finalist at the North of England Championships (1893), the Sheffield and Hallamshire Championships (1894), the Colchester Championship (1895), the Warwickshire Championships (1898), the Riviera Championships (1902), Mid-Kent Championships (1905), the Yorkshire Championships (1905), the Leicestershire Championships (1905), and the Swiss International Championships (1908)

== Personal ==
Charles was born in 1868 Saint Neots, Bedfordshire, England. He was one of the twin sons of Rev. Hunter Bird Allen, the Rector of Colmworth Parish, and Adelaide Mary Gladstone. His twin brother was the other notable tennis player Roy Allen It was Hunter Bird who taught the Charles and Roy how to play tennis which proved very successful for both of them. He died on 24 December 1924.

== Sources ==
- Council, Bedford (21 June 2019). "The Allen Family of Colmworth". bedsarchives.bedford.gov.uk.
- Kelly's (1885). directory of Bedfordshire, Hunts, and Northamptonshire. Kellys Directories Limited.
- Lawn Tennis and Croquet Club, All England. "Player Profile: Charles Allen". www.wimbledon.com. Lawn Tennis Association.
- Lawn Tennis and Croquet Club, All England. "Draws Archive: Gentleman's All Comers Doubles". www.wimbledon.com. Lawn Tennis Association.
- Myers, Arthur Wallis (1903). "The Northern Championship". Lawn Tennis at Home and Abroad. London: Scribner's sons.
- Nieuwland, Alex. "Player – Charles Gladstone Allen". www.tennisarchives.com. Netherlands: Tennis Archives. Retrieved 9 October 2022.
- The Age Newspaper. (1924). Melbourne, Victoria, Australia: Trove: National Library of Australia.
- Tennis Club Boulogne Sur Mer, "History:TCB". tennisclubboulognesurmer.net.
