= Framlingham Open (tennis) =

Defunct tennis tournament
- Founded: 1883; 142 years ago
- Abolished: 1983; 42 years ago
- Location: Framlingham, Suffolk, England.
- Venue: Framlingham College
- Surface: Grass

The Framlingham Open was a men's and women's grass court tennis tournament founded in 1883 and held at the Framlingham College, Framlingham, Suffolk, England until 1983. The event is still played today, but is no longer part of the senior worldwide tour.

== History ==
In August 1883 an annual Framlingham lawn tennis tournament established by the Framlingham Lawn Tennis Club, and played on the Hurts Hill Courts, Hurts Hill Park, Saxmundham Suffolk, England that ran until 1914. It was not staged throughout World War One. It resumed in 1919 and that event also carried the joint title of Suffolk Championships for that year, and in 1922.

The Framlingham event continued to be held at Hurts Hall Park, Saxmundham until 1936, when it was moved to the tennis courts of the Framlingham College Grounds at Framlingham (a distance of 17 miles) until the start of World War Two.

On 12 August 1883 an annual open Saxmundham Lawn Tennis Tournament was also established at Hurts Hall Park, Saxmundham, Suffolk, England that ran until 1892. In 1893 the Saxmundham Lawn Tennis Tournament was renamed the Suffolk Championships.

From 1915 the championships being organised and staged by the Saxmundham LTC were not held until 1920 due to the World War I. From 1923 until the out break of World War II in 1939 championships continued to be held in Saxmundham. After World War II the Framlingham LTC took over responsibility for organising the Suffolk Championships at Framlingham College until 1983. The Framlingham Tennis Tournament as distinct event was staged alongside the now Suffolk Championships until 1983. The event is still played today, but is no longer part of the senior worldwide tour.

== Finals ==
=== Men's singles ===
(Incomplete Roll)

Year	Champions	Runners-up	Score
Framlingham Open Lawn Tennis Tournament
1883	(England) William Bolding Monement	(England) Francis William Monement	divided title.
1883	(England) William Bolding Monement	(England) Charles Hoadley Ashe Ross	6–1, 9–7, 6–3.
1914/1918	Not held (due to world war one)		
1919	(United Kingdom) Herbert Roper Barrett	(United Kingdom) Bunny Austin	6–3, 0–6, 8–6.
1936	(United Kingdom) Harold Hare	(United Kingdom) L. Garfoe	6–3, 0–6, 8–6.
1939/1945	Not held (due to world war one)		
1953	(United Kingdom) John Horn	(United Kingdom) L. Garfoe	6–3, 0–6, 8–6.
1954	(New Zealand) John Barry	(Pakistan) Rafiq Ahmad	6–2, 6–2.
1955	(Republic of Ireland) Geoffrey Cass	(Australia) J.F. Robertson	6–4, 6–4.
1956	(South Africa) Roche Goosen	(South Africa) Les Bowring	6–3, 4–6, 8–6.
1957	(Australia) Peter B. Frankland	(United Kingdom) Tony Clayton	4–6, 6–0, 6–1.
1959	(United States) Hugh West Sweeney	(United Kingdom) Lawrence Franklin Strong	9–7, 6–1.
1960	(Canada) Laurie Strong	(United Kingdom) Bobby Thorn	6–3, 4–6, 6–3.
1965	(United Kingdom) Paul Hutchins	(United Kingdom) Alf Long	6–4, 6–2.
1966	(United Kingdom) Kevin Woolcott	(New Zealand) Onny Parun	11–9, 7–5.
↓ Open era ↓
1968	(New Zealand) Neil C. McAffer	(United Kingdom) Paul Sussams	6–4, 4–6, 11–9.
1969	(Rhodesia) Hank Irvine	(New Zealand) Richard N. Hawkes	1–6, 6–2, 6–4.
1970	(United Kingdom) Robin Drysdale	(United Kingdom) J.C. Tatum	6–1, 6–4.
1973	(United Kingdom) Mike Cole	(United Kingdom) J.C. Tatum	9–7, 2–6, 6–1.
1974	(United Kingdom) Eddie Fox	(United Kingdom) Alan Rayner	6–3, 6–4.
1975	(United Kingdom) Mike Cole	(United Kingdom) Eddie Fox	11–9, 8–10, 6–3.
1976	(Australia) Noel Phillips	(United Kingdom) Eddie Fox	6–4, 6–2.
1977	(United Kingdom) Eddie Fox	(Republic of Ireland) John Biscomb	6–2, 6–1.
1978	(United States) Mike Mullan	(United Kingdom) D. Rainey	6–1, 6–0.
1979	(United Kingdom) D. Rainey	(United Kingdom) J. Willson	7–6, 7–6.
1980	(United Kingdom) Paul Billingham	(United Kingdom) J. Willson	2–6, 6–3, 6–3.
1981	(United Kingdom) Paul Butcher	(Uganda) C. Musaka	7–6, 6–1.

=== Women's singles ===
(Incomplete Roll)

Year	Champions	Runners-up	Score
Framlingham Open Lawn Tennis Tournament
1914/1918	Not held (due to world war one)		
1921	(United Kingdom) Dorothy Holman	(United Kingdom) Erika E. Tanner	5–7, 6–3, 6–2
1922	(United Kingdom) Dorothy Holman	(United Kingdom) Kathleen Lidderdale	6–2, 6–0
1930	(United Kingdom) Joan Ridley	(United Kingdom) Joan Austin	6–3, 2–6, 6–2.
1939/1945	Not held (due to world war one)		
1954	(United Kingdom) Angela Mortimer	(United States) Beverly Baker Fleitz	6–4, 6–3.
1960	(United Kingdom) Ann Haydon	(United Kingdom) Pat Hird	6–1, 6–3.
↓ Open era ↓
1970	(United Kingdom) Shirley Brasher	(United Kingdom) J.C. Tatum	6–1, 6–4.
