= Riviera Championships =

Riviera Championships Menton International

Defunct tennis tournament
- Tour: ILTF World Circuit (1913–1972); ILTF Independent Circuit (1973–, 76, 1978)
- Founded: 1902
- Abolished: 1976
- Location: Menton, Provence-Alpes-Côte d'Azur, France
- Venue: Menton Lawn Tennis Club,
- Surface: outdoor (clay)

The Riviera Championships also known as the Championship of the Riviera or the French Riviera Championships or Menton International was an open men's and women's international tennis tournament played at the Menton Lawn Tennis Club, Menton, Provence-Alpes-Côte d'Azur, France on clay courts from 1902 until 1976 and again in 1978.

== History ==
The Riviera Championships also known as the Championship of the Riviera was an open men's and women's international tennis tournament played at the Menton Lawn Tennis Club, Menton, Provence-Alpes-Côte d'Azur, France on clay courts. The first edition was inaugurated on 22 March 1902, the tournament ran until 1975. In 1904 a mixed doubles event was scheduled.

The tournament was part of the French Riviera circuit tennis tour, which was series of international amateur tennis events held on the French Riviera, usually starting at the end of the preceding year around late December, through until the end of April. The tournament was known as the Riviera Championships until 1942. Following World War II the event was suspended until 1950 after which it took on the denomination as the Menton International Championships or simply Menton International.

== Finals ==
=== Men's singles ===
Incomplete Roll

Riviera Championships
Year	Champions	Runners-up	Score
1902	(Belgium) William le Maire de Warzée d'Hermalle	(United Kingdom) Charles Gladstone Allen	3–6, 6–2, 6–4, 7–5
1903	(United Kingdom) Roy Allen	?	?
1904	(United Kingdom) Major Ritchie	(United Kingdom) Roy Allen	6–4, 6–2, 6–1
1905	(United Kingdom) Major Ritchie (2)	(United Kingdom) Roy Allen	6–2, 4–6, 6–4, ret.
1906	(New Zealand) Anthony Wilding	(United Kingdom) Major Ritchie	6–1, 6–4, 6–0
1907	(United Kingdom) Major Ritchie (3)	(England) George Simond	6–2, 6–2, 6–4
1908	(United Kingdom) Major Ritchie (4)	(New Zealand) Anthony Wilding	1–6, 6–2, 7–5, 2–6, 8–6
1909	(United States) Fred Alexander	(United Kingdom) Major Ritchie	6–4, 6–2, 3–0, ret.
1910	(United States) Max Decugis	(United Kingdom) Major Ritchie	4-2, ret.
1911	(New Zealand) Anthony Wilding (2)	(France) Max Decugis	6–2, 6–3, 3–6, 5–7, 6–3
1912	(United Kingdom) Roy Allen	(United Kingdom) Arthur Wallis Myers	6–0, 3–6, 6–1, 6–8, 6–0
1913	(New Zealand) Anthony Wilding (3)	(Germany) Friedrich Wilhelm Rahe	6–2, 6–3, 6–1
1914	(New Zealand) Anthony Wilding (4)	(United Kingdom) Gordon Lowe	6–1, 6–4, 6–2
1915/1918	Not held (due to world war one)		
1919	(Romania) Nicolae Mishu	(France) Max Decugis	6–3, 6–2, 10–12, 2–6, 7-5
1920	(Romania) Nicolae Mishu (2)	(United Kingdom) Gordon Lowe	4-3, ret.
1921	(United Kingdom) Gordon Lowe	(France) Alain Gerbault	6–1, 6–3, 6–4
1922	(Australia) Rupert Wertheim	(United Kingdom) P. Marsden	6–2, 6–1, 6–4
1923	(United Kingdom) Gordon Lowe (2)	(United Kingdom) F. R. L. Crawford	6–2, 6–3, 7–5
1924	(United Kingdom) Gordon Lowe (3)	(Italy) Uberto De Morpurgo	6–3, 6–1, 3–6, 2–6, 6–2
1925	(United Kingdom) Gordon Lowe (4)	(Italy) Uberto De Morpurgo	6–2, 6–0, 4–6, 7–5
1926	(France) Henri Cochet	(Hungary) Béla von Kehrling	6–4, 3–6, 7–5, 3–6, 8–6
1927	(Italy) Uberto De Morpurgo	(Hungary) Béla von Kehrling	6–4, 6–4, 6–4
1928	(Hungary) Béla von Kehrling	(Denmark) Erik Worm	6–1, 8–6, 1–6, 6–3
1929	(Hungary) Béla von Kehrling (2)	(Austria) Franz-Wilhelm Matejka	6–4, 7–5, 6–1
1930	(United States) Bill Tilden	(France) Jacques Brugnon	10–8, 7–5, 3–6, 4–6, 6–1
1931	(Hungary) Béla von Kehrling (3)	(Brazil) E. Garcia	6–2, 6–3, 6–1
1932	(Czechoslovakia) Roderich Menzel	(France) André Merlin	6–3, 6–0, 4–6, 6–4
1933	(France) André Martin-Legeay	(Nazi Germany) Gottfried von Cramm	4–6, 7–5, 6–4, 6–4
1934	(Italy) Giorgio de Stefani	(France) André Martin-Legeay	8–6, 6–2, 6–2
1935	(Czechoslovakia) Josef Caska	(United States) Wilmer Hines	3–6, 6–4, 6–2, 6–2
1936	(France) Jean Lesueur	(United States) Norcross S. Tilney	6–2, 6–1, 5–7, 5–7, 6–1
1937	(Sweden) Kalle Schröder	(Poland) Kazimierz Tarlowski	8–6, 6–2, 6–4
1938	(Sweden) Kalle Schröder (2)	(Italy) Valentino Taroni	6–3, 6–2, 6–1
1939	(Socialist Federal Republic of Yugoslavia) Franjo Punčec	(Austria) Hans Redl	11–9, 6–2, 6–0
1940/1945	Not held (due to world war two)		
Menton International Championships
1954	(Uruguay) Eduardo Argon	(Monaco) Alexandre-Athenase Noghès	6–3, 6–4, 9–7
1955	(Poland) Władysław Skonecki	(France) Paul Rémy	6–1, 6–1, 6–3
1957	(Spain) Andrés Gimeno	(Italy) Sergio Jacobini	6–3, 6–1, 6–2
1958	(Belgium) Jacques Brichant	(France) Paul Rémy	6–1, 6–4, 6–2
1959	(United Kingdom) Billy Knight	(Hungary) István Gulyás	6-4, 6-2
1960	(Belgium) Jacques Brichant (2)	(France) Robert Haillet	5–7, 6–3, 6–4, 1–6, 6–1
1961	(Belgium) Jacques Brichant (3)	(Italy) Antonio Maggi	6–4, 6–2, 6–2
1962	(Spain) Juan Manuel Couder	(Colombia) William Álvarez	6–3, 2–6, 6–1
1963	(Hungary) István Gulyás	(France) Pierre Barthès	8–6, 6–2, 6–4
Menton International
1964	(France) Pierre Darmon	(Hungary) István Gulyás	6–2, 6–2, 6–4
1965	(Hungary) István Gulyás (2)	(Australia) Bob Carmichael	6–4, 6–1, 6–3
1966	(Hungary) István Gulyás (3)	(Belgium) Patrick Hombergen	6–2, 6–2, 6–2
1967	(Austria) Dieter Schultheiss	(West Germany) Bernd Kube	3-0 sets
1968	(Soviet Union) Alex Metreveli	(Czechoslovakia) Milan Holeček	7–5, 6–4, 6–4
↓ Open era ↓
1969	(Hungary) Géza Varga	(Italy) Giuseppe Merlo	6–0, 7–5
1975	(Sweden) Bengt Lundstedt	(France) Patrice Beust	6–4, 2–6, 6–3
French Riviera Invitation
1978	(Sweden) Bjorn Borg	(Argentina) Guillermo Vilas	6–4, 6–3

=== Men's doubles ===
Incomplete Roll

Riviera Championships
Year	Champions	Runners-up	Score
1908	(United Kingdom) Major Ritchie (United Kingdom) George Simond	(France) George de Bray (Germany) Monsieur Jermoloff	6–0, 6–1, 6–1

=== Women's singles ===
Riviera Championships
Year	Champions	Runners-up	Score
1902	(United Kingdom) V. Henshaw	(France) Miss Tomer	6-3, 6-1
1903	(United Kingdom) Mildred Brooksmith	?	?
1904	(United Kingdom) V. Henshaw (2)	(United Kingdom) Miss Rooke	5–7, 6–2, 6–1
1905	(United Kingdom) Amy Ransome	(United States) Vera Warden	7-5, 8-6
1906	(United States) Vera Warden	(United Kingdom) Amy Ransome	8-6, 6-3
1907	(United Kingdom) Rosamund Salusbury	(United Kingdom) Miss Hampshire	7-5, 6-0
1908	(United Kingdom) Maud Dillon	(United Kingdom) Evelyn Dillon	w.o.
1909	(United Kingdom) Rosamund Salusbury (2)	(England) Alice Greene	w.o.
1910	(United Kingdom) Rosamund Salusbury (3)	(United Kingdom) Evelyn M. Froude Bellew	6-3, 6-2
1911	(United Kingdom) Jessie Tripp	(United Kingdom) Rosamund Salusbury	6–2, 6–8, 7–5
1912	(Germany) Mieken Rieck	(United Kingdom) Margaret Tripp	1–6, 7–5, 6–3
1913	(Germany) Dagmar von Krohn	(United Kingdom) Madeline Fisher O'Neill	4–6, 6–2, 6–4
1914	(United Kingdom) Dorothea Douglass Chambers	(United States) Elizabeth Ryan	6-2, 6-1
1915/1918	Not held (due to world war one)		
1919	(France) Suzanne Lenglen	(France) A. Doublet	6-0, 6-1
1920	(United Kingdom) Geraldine Ramsey Beamish	(Sweden) Sigrid Frenckell Fick	6–1, 4–6, 6–2
1921	(United States) Elizabeth Ryan	(United Kingdom) Phyllis Satterthwaite	6-4, 6-3
1922	(United States) Elizabeth Ryan (2)	(United Kingdom) Phyllis Satterthwaite	6-3, 6-3
1923	(France) Suzanne Lenglen (2)	(United Kingdom) Kathleen McKane	6-2, 7-5
1924	(France) Suzanne Lenglen (3)	(United States) Elizabeth Ryan	7-5, 6-1
1925	(United States) Elizabeth Ryan (3)	(United Kingdom) Honor Woolrych	3–6, 6–0, 6–2
1926	(United States) Helen Wills	(Spain) Lili de Alvarez	6-4, 6-4
1927	(United States) Elizabeth Ryan (4)	(United Kingdom) Dorothy Shaw	6-4, 7-5
1928	(Spain) Lili de Alvarez	(Italy) Lucia Valerio	6-4, 7-5
1929	(United Kingdom) Phyllis Howkins Covell	(Germany) Cilly Aussem	6-4, 9-7
1930	(Germany) Cilly Aussem	(France) Simonne Mathieu	9-7, 6-2
1931	(United Kingdom) Phyllis Satterthwaite	(France) Simonne Mathieu	7-5, 6-4
1932	(France) Simonne Mathieu	(Italy) Lucia Valerio	6-2, 6-3
1933	(France) Simonne Mathieu (2)	(United Kingdom) Peggy Scriven	6-3, 6-2
1934	(France) Sylvie Jung Henrotin	(Italy) Lucia Valerio	3–6, 6–3, 6–0
1935	(France) Simonne Mathieu (3)	(France) Edith Belliard	6-2, 6-1
1936	(Poland) Jadwiga Jędrzejowska	(France) Edith Belliard	6-2, 6-1
1937	(Chile) Anita Lizana	(Poland) Jadwiga Jędrzejowska	6–8, 8–6, 1–1 retired
1938	(Poland) Jadwiga Jędrzejowska	(Socialist Federal Republic of Yugoslavia) Hella Kovac	4–6, 6–4, 6–2
1939	(France) Simone Iribarne Lafargue	(France) Simonne Mathieu	2–6, 6–4, 6–3
1940/1950	Not held (due to World War II) and women's event not held		
Menton International Championships
1951	(Austria) Hella Strecker	(Italy) Vittoria Tonolli	8–10, 9–7, 10-8
1952	(United Kingdom) Joan Curry	(Italy) Silvana Lazzarino	6-1, 6-0
1953	(West Germany) Inge Pohmann	(United Kingdom) Joan Curry	6-4, 6-1
1954	(United Kingdom) Joan Curry (2)	(United Kingdom) Shirley Bloomer	6-3, 6-4
1955	(United Kingdom) Shirley Bloomer	(United Kingdom) Pat Ward	6-3, 7-5
1956	(United Kingdom) Shirley Bloomer (2)	(West Germany) Ilse Buding	7-5, 6-4
1957	(Italy) Lucia Bassi	(United Kingdom) Susanah Prettejohn	11-9, 6-0
1958	(Hungary) Zsuzsa Körmöczy	(Italy) Lucia Bassi	6-4, 6-1
1959	(France) Flo de la Courtie	(Italy) Lucia Bassi	7-5, 6-1
1960	(Hungary) Zsuzsa Körmöczy	(France) Flo de la Courtie	6-2, 6-3
Menton International
1961	(United States) Mimi Arnold	(United Kingdom) Elizabeth Starkie	5–7, 6–4, 6–0
1962	(Italy) Francesca Gordigiani	(West Germany) Hilde Schildknecht	7–9, 9–7, 6–4
1963	(France) Jacqueline Rees-Lewis	(United Kingdom) Carole Rosser	6–3, 4–6, 7–5
1964	(France) Jacqueline Rees-Lewis (2)	(Belgium) Christiane Mercelis	4–6, 7–5, 6–3
1965	(Australia) Gail Sherriff	(United Kingdom) Virginia Wade	6–4, 4–6, 6–2
1966	(Australia) Jill Blackman	(France) Jacqueline Rees-Lewis	3–6, 6–3, 6–4
1967	(France) Jacqueline Rees-Lewis Vives (3)	(Italy) Roberta Beltrame	6-1, 6-3
1968	(Australia) Gail Sherriff (2)	(Czechoslovakia) Vlasta Vopičková	6-1, 6-0
↓ Open era ↓
1969	(France) Johanne Venturino	(Argentina) Ana Maria Cavadini	3–6, 6–2, 6–4
1970	(France) Gail Sherriff Chanfreau (3)	(United Kingdom) Corinne Molesworth	6-1, 6-2
1971	(West Germany) Helga Niessen Masthoff	(United Kingdom) Corinne Molesworth	7-5 2-6 7-5
1972	(Hungary) Judith Szorenyi	(Sweden) Margareta Strandberg	8-6, 6-3
1973	(France) Odile de Roubin	(France) Monique Salfati-Di Maso	7-5, 6-3
1975	(Netherlands) Elly Appel	(France) Brigitte Simon	4–6, 6–2, 6–0
1976	(Belgium) Monique van Haver	(Italy) Sabina Simmonds	6–4, 5–7, 6–2

=== Mix Doubles ===
Incomplete Roll

Riviera Championships
Year	Champions	Runners-up	Score
1904	(United Kingdom) Charles Gladstone Allen (France) Miss Bournd	(United Kingdom) Roy Allen (United Kingdom) Miss Powell	default
1906	(New Zealand) Anthony Wilding (United Kingdom) Amy Ransome	(United Kingdom) Charles Gladstone Allen (England) Agnes Morton	6–3, 6–1
1907	(United Kingdom) Major Ritchie (United Kingdom) Rosamund Salusbury	(France) George de Bray (France) Mlle Kraminski	6-0, 6-1

== Sources ==
- American Lawn Tennis. (1939). New York: American Lawn Tennis Publishing Company.
- Auckland Star. National Library of New Zealand. 4 May 1906.
- Paret, Jahial Parmly; Allen, J. P.; Alexander, Frederick B.; Hardy, Samuel (1906). Spalding's tennis annual . New York: American sports publishing company.
- The Press Newspaper. National Library of New Zealand. 25 April 1913.
- The Northern Times. Carnarvon, WA: National Library of Australia.
- The Press Newspaper. National Library of New Zealand. 25 April 1913.
- Town & Country. New York, United States: Hearst Corporation. 1932.
- Writers, Staff. "1877 to 2012 Finals Results". Steve G Tennis. stevegtennis.com.
