= Ernest Hutton =

Australian cricketer

Personal information
- Full name: Ernest Hamilton Hutton
- Born: 26 March 1867; Mount Rouse, Australia
- Died: 12 July 1929 (aged 62); Ascot, Queensland, Australia

Domestic team information
- Years: Team
- 1891–92: Victoria
- 1893–94: Queensland
- Source: Cricinfo, 26 July 2015

Ernest Hamilton Hutton (26 March 1867 – 12 July 1929) was an Australian cricketer. He played one first-class cricket match for Victoria in 1892 and one for Queensland in 1894.

== See also ==
- List of Victoria first-class cricketers
