= Louis Riboulet =

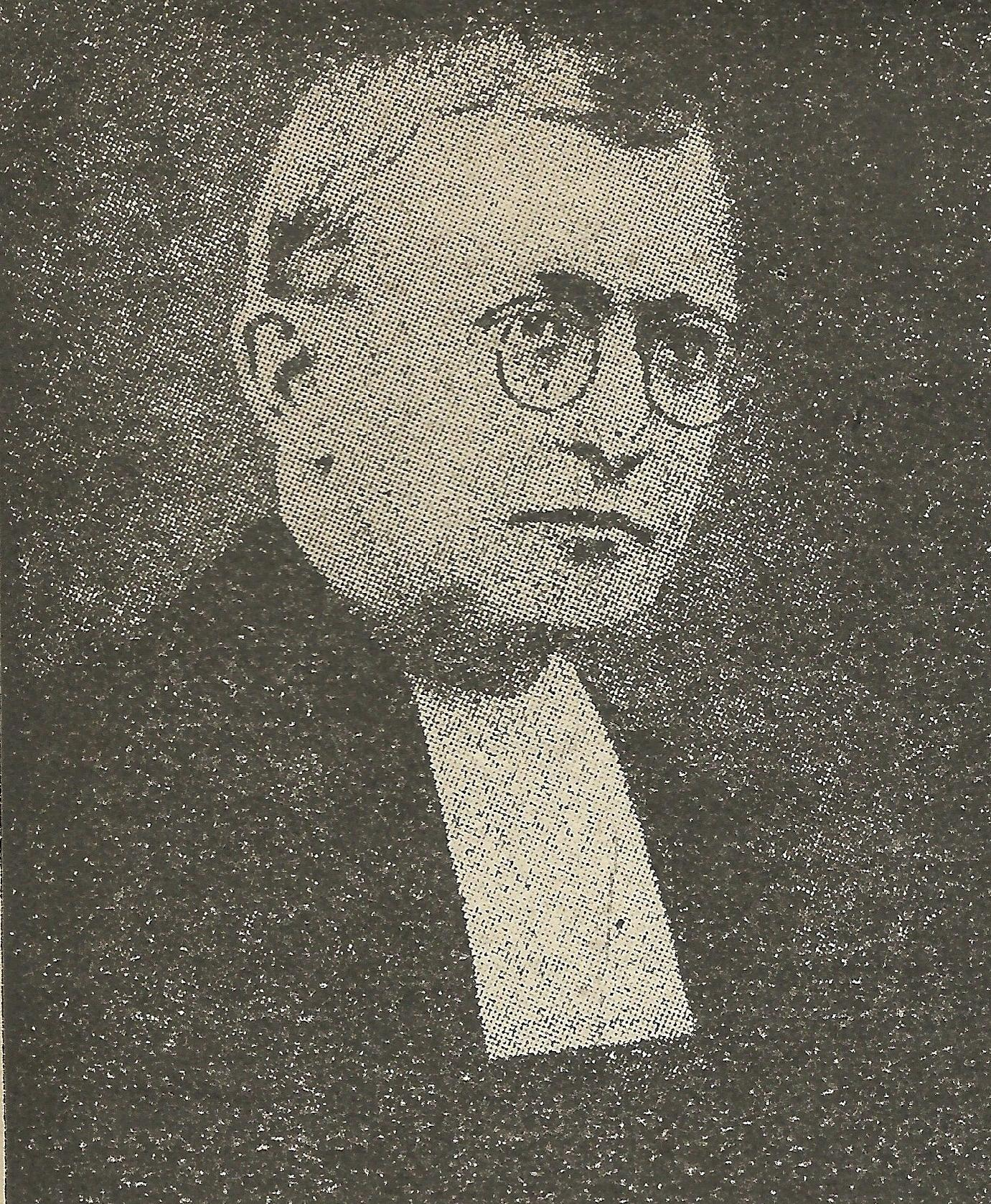
- Born: January 15, 1871; Saint-Alban-d'Ay; France
- Died: 1944 (aged about 73)
- Occupations: Pedagogue, writer, professor
- Writing career
- Notable works: Conseils sur le Travail intellectuel, Historie de la Pédagogie

Louis Riboulet (Saint-Alban-d'Ay, January 15, 1871 – 1944) was a French pedagogue, writer and professor of philosophy in Notre-Dame de Valbenoîte, author of several works about teaching methods.

== Biography ==
Riboulet made his first studies at Marist Brothers school in his homeland. In 1886, he entered the seminary of the same religious congregation in Saint-Genis-Laval and three years after, gets the title schoolteacher, by examining the state. Receiving an invitation, he went to North America, where he remains until 1914.

Earned him much, for your teacher training, research and educational observations made during this period in the city of Iberville, located in the Montérégie region of Quebec, Canada, and the United States. Applying intensely studies, he graduated from the Institute of Scientific Study, University of New York. Moving back to France in 1914 and, years later, returns to teaching at the College of Notre Dame of Valbenoîte in Saint-Étienne. In 1925 it was published Historie de la Pédagogie, prize-winning work by the French Academy in the following year. Followed by Psychologie appliquée à l'Éducation, Conseils sur le Travail intellectuel, La Discipline Préventive et ses Éléments Essentiels and Méthodologie Générale. As a posthumous work, it was published L'Eglise et l'Éducation de l'Ère Chrétienne au XIV Siècle. Riboulet still found time to act as a columnist in several and prestigious magazines about education, including Bulletin des Études, Revue Catéchistique and Revue Belge de Pédagogie.

Riboulet was contrary to traditional expedients of education prevailing at the time, which included physical punishment to students who did not have a good academic performance.

== Works ==
- Conseils sur le Travail Intellectuel: aux Étudiants et aux Jeunes Maîtres
- Historie de la Pédagogie
- L'Eglise et l'Éducation de l'Ère Chrétienne au XIV Siècle
- La Discipline Préventive et ses Éléments Essentiels
- Manuel de Psychologie Appliquée à l'Éducation
- Pédagogie Générale
- Méthodologie Générale
