= Montrose, New Jersey =

Populated place in Monmouth County, New Jersey, US

- Unincorporated community
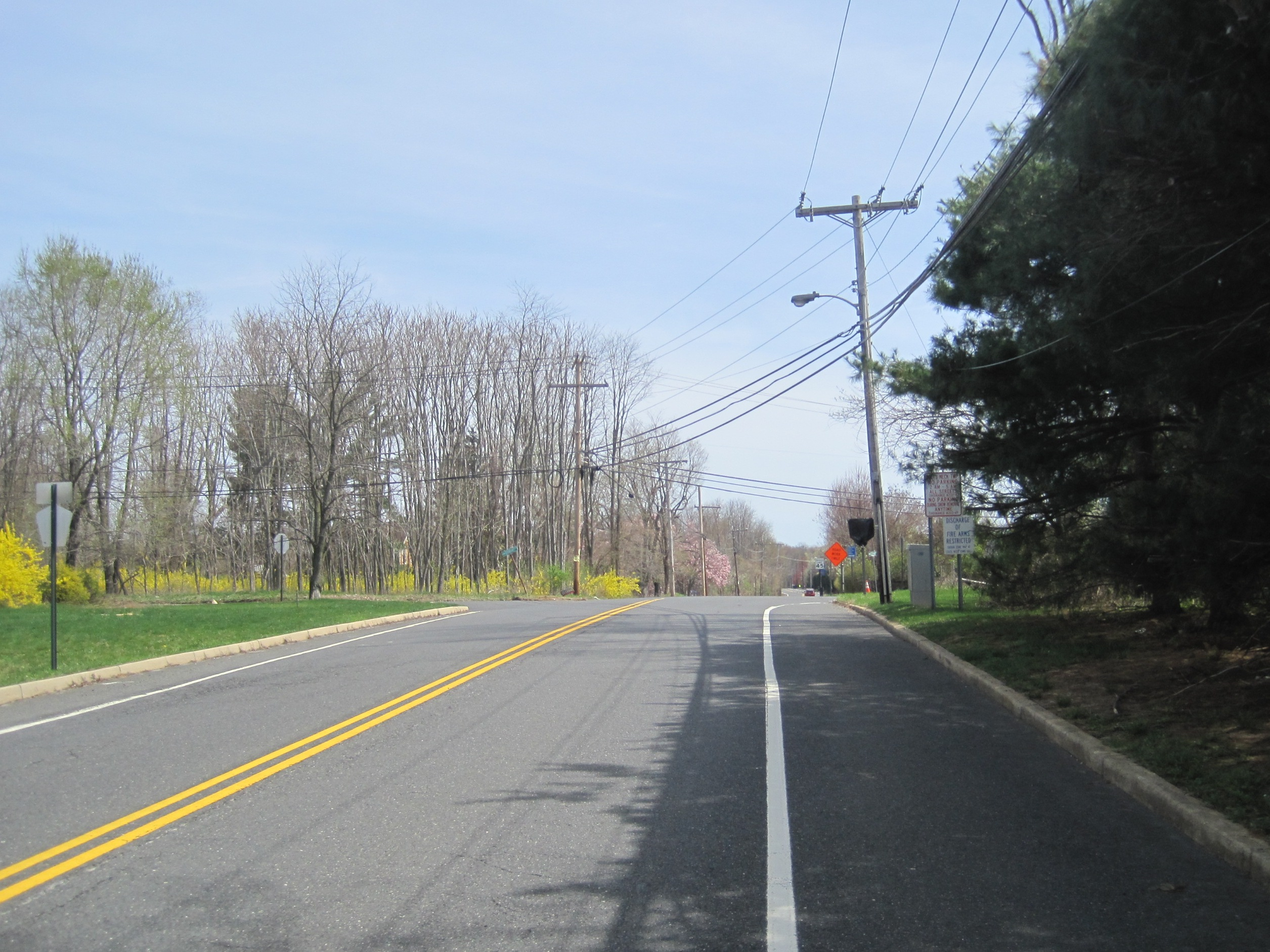
- Dutch Lane Road approaching Boundary Road

- Location in Monmouth County. Inset: Location of county within the state of New Jersey Montrose (New Jersey) Montrose (the United States)
- Coordinates: 40°18′06″N 74°13′17″W
- Country: United States
- State: New Jersey
- County: Monmouth
- Township: Colts Neck and Marlboro
- Elevation: 157 ft (48 m)
- Time zone: UTC−05:00 (Eastern (EST))
  - Summer (DST): UTC−04:00 (EDT)
- GNIS feature ID: 878453

Montrose is an unincorporated community located near the intersection of Dutch Lane Road (County Route 46) and Boundary Road along the border of Colts Neck and Marlboro townships in Monmouth County, in the U.S. state of New Jersey. The town was located in "Atlantic Township" at one time prior to the name being changed to "Colts Neck". Prior to being called Montrose, the area was called "Barrentown".

The community was electrified in 1928, the fire department was formed in 1926, and a rural mail route was established in 1905.

== Farming ==
The farms in the area were known for many items, mostly dairy cows, horses, potatoes, and peaches. In 1929, John Koster was noted to have a large greenhouse and sold flowers.

== Historic schoolhouse ==
The area is known for the historic one-room Montrose Schoolhouse, built before 1786, which is located in the Colts Neck portion of the community. It was used for many years as a meeting place, religious meeting house, and school house. It last held school classes in 1922, and the last known school bus driver was James Danser.

The schoolhouse was donated to the Colts Neck Historical Society by George Illmensee prior to 1968. It was moved to its present location in 1967 due to building a subdivision. Prior to moving it was located on Montrose Road and Cedar Drive. It was restored at a cost of $1006.57.

== Hunt club ==
For many years, Montrose was one of the starting locations for the Monmouth County Hunt. Sometimes numbering as many as 100 hunters, the community hunts would meet at the Montrose School house, prior to starting out. Fox and rabbits were the focus of the hunts.
