= Bradford Open =

Defunct tennis tournament
- Tour: NLTA Circuit
- Founded: 1893
- Abolished: 1899
- Location: Bradford; England
- Venue: Horton Park
- Surface: Grass / outdoor
- Draw: 18 (S); 8 (D)

The Bradford Open was a mens open grass court tennis tournament established in June 1893. It was organised by the Bradford LTC and played at Horton Park, Bradford, West Riding of Yorkshire, England until 1899 when it was discontinued.

== History ==
The Bradford Open was a mens and grass court tennis organised by Bradford Lawn Tennis Club and first played at Little Horton Green, before later moving to Horton Park, Bradford.

== Finals ==
=== Singles ===
(incomplete roll)

Year	Winners	Runners-up	Score
1893	(United Kingdom) Roy Allen	(United Kingdom) Henry Starke-Jones	6-1, 6-1, 6-1
1894	(United Kingdom) Roy Allen	(United Kingdom) Charles G. Allen	divided title.
1895	(United Kingdom) Charles G. Allen	(United Kingdom) Ernest Black	6-3, 12-10
1896	(United Kingdom) Roy Allen	(United Kingdom) Ernest Black	2-6, 6-1, 6-3
1897	(United Kingdom) Charles G. Allen	(United Kingdom) Douglas Roberts	6-3, 1-6, 6-4

=== Doubles ===
(incomplete roll)

Year	Winners	Runners-up	Score
1896	(United Kingdom) Charles G. Allen (United Kingdom) Roy Allen	(United Kingdom) Ernest Black (United Kingdom) Thompson Jowett	6-3, 6-1, 6-1

== Sources ==
- British Newspaper Archive
- Tennis Archives/Tournaments/Bradford
