= Marryatt Cup =

Defunct tennis tournament
- Founded: 1891; 135 years ago
- Abolished: 1938; 88 years ago
- Location: Bombay, India
- Venue: Bombay Gymkhana Club
- Surface: Clay

The Marryatt Cup was a mens clay court tennis tournament founded in 1891 as the Marryatt Lawn Tennis Challenge Cup. The event was played at the Bombay Gymkhana Club, Bombay, India, until 1938 when it was discontinued due to World War Two.
