= West Sussex Championships =

Defunct tennis tournament
- Tour: ILTF World Circuit (1913-76)
- Founded: 1891; 134 years ago
- Abolished: 1976; 49 years ago
- Location: Chichester; Bognor Regis; England
- Venue: Priory LTC; Bognor Regis LTC
- Surface: Grass

The West Sussex Championships was a combined grass court tennis tournament founded in 1891 as a men's event called the West Sussex Challenge Cup. It was first played at the Priory LTC in Chichester, West Sussex England until 1912 then was discontinued. In 1922 the event was restarted and moved location to Bognor Regis, West Sussex where it was rebranded as the West Sussex Championships it continued to be held there with breaks until 1976.
