= Neighborhood Club Invitation =

Defunct tennis tournament
- Tour: USNLTA Circuit
- Founded: 1892
- Abolished: 1900
- Editions: 9
- Location: West Newton, Massachusetts; United Stats
- Venue: Neighborhood Club
- Category: Invitational
- Surface: Clay / outdoor

The Neighborhood Club Invitation was a men's clay court tennis tournament founded in 1892. Also known as the West Newton Invitation, it was played at the Neighborhood Club, West Newton, Massachusetts, United States. The format for this event was a round robin tournament.

The event ran annually until 1900 when it was discontinued.

== Past editions ==
(incomplete)

=== 1892 ===
Included:

Standing
#	Player	Matches W/L
1st	(United States) Fred Hovey	5–1
2nd	(United States) Malcolm Chace	4–2
3rd	(United States) Bob Wrenn	3–3
4th	(United States) Hugh Tallant	2–4
5th	(United States) Rodmond Beach	1–5
"	(United States) Albert Empie Wright	1–5

=== 1893 ===
Included:

Notes:First placed players shared title & Prizes.

Standing
#	Player	Matches W/L
1st	(United States) Fred Hovey	6–2
"	(United States) Clarence Hobart	6–2
3rd	(United States) Bob Wrenn	5–3
4th	(United States) Malcolm Chace	2–6
5th	(United States) Bill Larned	1–7

=== 1894 ===
Included:

Standing
#	Player	Matches W/L
1st	(United States) Fred Hovey	5–1
2nd	(United States) Clarence Hobart	3–3
3rd	(United States) Malcolm Chace	2–3
4th	(United States) Arthur Foote	2–4
5th	(United States) Bob Wrenn	0–1 default

=== 1895 ===
Notes: This edition included a playoff to the determine winner.'

Standing
#	Player	Matches W/L
1st	(Ireland) Joshua Pim	4–1
"	(Ireland) Harold Mahony	4–1
3rd	(United States) Malcolm Chace	3–2
4th	(United States) Fred Hovey	2–3
5th	(United States) Clarence Hobart	1–4
"	(United States) Bill Larned	1–4

Playoff

Year	Winner	Runner-up	Score
1894	(Ireland) Joshua Pim	(Ireland) Harold Mahony	6–4, 5–7, 4–6, 6–4, 6–3

== Sources ==
- Google News Archive
- Wright & Ditson Lawn Tennis Guide (1893)
- Wright & Ditson Lawn Tennis Guide (1894)
- Wright & Ditson Lawn Tennis Guide (1895)
