= Roy Allen (tennis) =

British tennis player

- Full name: Edward Roy Allen
- Country (sports): United Kingdom
- Born: 28 December 1868 Saint Neots, Bedfordshire, England
- Died: 4 November 1931 (aged 63) Prestbury, Gloucestershire, England
- Turned pro: 1887 (amateur tour)
- Retired: 1914

Singles
- Career record: 668/200 (76.96%)
- Career titles: 97

Grand Slam singles results
- Wimbledon: 2R (1896, 1899)

Doubles

Grand Slam doubles results
- Wimbledon: F (1896)

Edward Roy Allen (28 December 1868 – 26 October 1930), and often referred to as E.R. Allen, was a British tennis player active in the late 19th century and early 20th century.

In major tournaments of the time he was an all-comers finalist in the men's doubles at the 1896 Wimbledon Championships partnering with his twin brother Charles Gladstone Allen where they lost to Reggie Doherty and Harold Nisbet. Roy played 28 consecutive seasons from 1887 to 1914, and won 97 singles titles.

== Career ==
Roy played his first tournament 1887 at the Stevenage tournament where he reached the semi-finals before losing to Arthur Gore. In 1891 he won his first title at the Boulogne International, Boulogne-sur-Mer, France against Charles Gladstone Allen. In February 1913 he won his final title at the San Remo International tournament in Italy. In 1914 he played his final tournament at the Monte Carlo Championships (today's Monte Carlo Masters) in France

Roy won numerous singles titles throughout his career, he won the Durham County Association Tournament at Sunderland seven times (1900–01, 1906–10), Nottinghamshire Championships five times (1896, 1899, 1900, 1904–04), the Sheffield and Hallamshire Championships five times, the East of England Championships at Felixstowe five times (1891, 1893, 1895, 1903–04), the Warwickshire Championships at Leamington Spa five times (1896, 1898–99, 1905, 1910).

He also won the Boulogne International Championship four times (1891, 1895, 1896–97), the East Grinstead Open four times (1906, 1908–1910). The following tournaments he won three times, the Hampshire County Lawn Tennis Championship (1907–1909), the Lowestoft Tournament (1907–08, 1910), the Shropshire Championships at Shrewsbury (1905, 1907–08), the Norwich Open (1907–08, 1910), the Burton-on-Trent Open (1893, 1896, 1905), the Leicestershire Championships (1900–01, 1905), the Suffolk Championships at Saxmundham (1895–96, 1903) and the Colchester Championship (1893–95).

The following tournaments he won at least two times including Italian Riviera Championships (1912–13), the Riviera Championships at Menton (1903, 1912), the Exmouth Open (1898, 1910), the Château-d'Œx tournament (1907–08), Nice (1902, 1906), Chichester Open (1896, 1905), the East Grinstead Open (1904, 1909), Gore Court Championships (1901, 1903), the Mid-Kent Championships (1900, 1904), the Yorkshire Championships (1894, 1905), Bradford Open (1893, 1896) and Bournemouth Open (1904–05).

In addition he won a single title at each of the following events, Newcastle Open (1894), West of England Championships (1895), Fitzwilliam Plate (1896), Kirkcaldy (1899), Essex Championships (1900), Frinton-on-Sea (1905), South Northumberland Tournament (1905), Cranbrook (1905), Warwick (1906), the French Switzerland Championships (1907), Worcestershire Championships (1908), Worthing (1908), Derbyshire Championships (1909) at Buxton, Southampton (1909), Skegness (1909), Great Yarmouth (1910) and the Dorset County Championships (1910).

He currently holds the all-time record for most titles won on grass courts at 82.

== Grand Slam finals ==
=== Doubles ===
==== All-Comers (1 runner up) ====
Result	Year	Championship	Surface	Partner	Opponents	Score
Loss	1896	Wimbledon	Grass	(United Kingdom of Great Britain and Ireland) Charles Gladstone Allen	(United Kingdom of Great Britain and Ireland) Reginald Doherty (United Kingdom of Great Britain and Ireland) Harold Nisbet	6–3, 5–7, 4–6, 1–6

== Personal ==
Roy was born in 1868 Saint Neots, Bedfordshire, England. He was one of the twin sons of Rev. Hunter Bird Allen, the Rector of Colmworth Parish, and Adelaide Mary Gladstone. His twin brother was the other notable tennis player Charles Gladstone Allen. It was Hunter Bird who taught Charles and Roy how to play tennis which proved very successful for both of them. He died on 4 November 1931.
