= Bertha Crouch Chase =

American athlete

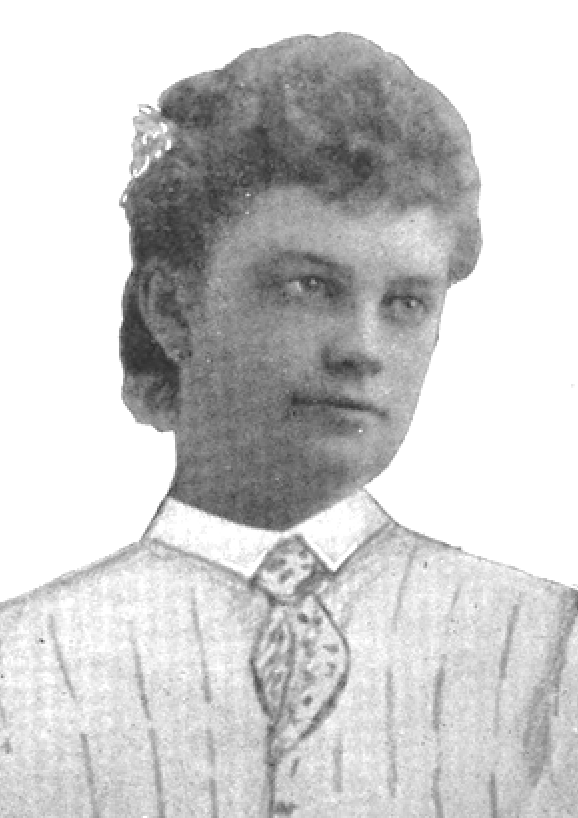
- Bertha Crouch, from an 1892 publication
- Born: Bertha Crouch; August 16, 1874; California, U.S.
- Died: July 8, 1957 (aged 82); Los Angeles, California, U.S.
- Other names: Bertha Wrightsman
- Occupation(s): Athlete, socialite

Bertha Crouch Chase Wrightsman (August 16, 1874 – July 8, 1957) was an American tennis player and golfer, active in California in the 1890s.

== Early life ==
Crouch was raised in Oakland, California, the daughter of farmer and rancher Elisha Crouch and Emily Rose Corbin Crouch.

== Sports career ==
Crouch played in golf tournaments in the 1890s, as a member of the Los Angeles Country Club and the Southern California Golf Association. She won the Ladies' Championship at a tournament in Santa Monica in 1899. She also competed in tennis tournaments in California. As a member of the Washington Tennis Club of East Oakland, she won a mixed doubles tournament in 1891, with partner Sam Lovett. She won the Pacific States women's singles championship in 1891, in San Rafael. She was also an avid cyclist and rower.

In 1922, Wrightsman returned to competition, as captain of the Virginia Country Club's team at a golf tournament in Long Beach.

== Personal life ==
Crouch was expected to marry wealthy Sam Van Camp, a member of the Van Camp canned beans family, in 1898; instead, she married citrus grower Martin Aquila Chase in 1899, in Van Nuys. Martin Chase died in 1913. Her second husband was John Earl Wrightsman; they married in 1920. John E. Wrightsman died in 1951, and she died in 1957, at the age of 82, in Los Angeles.
