= Laurent Riboulet =

French tennis player

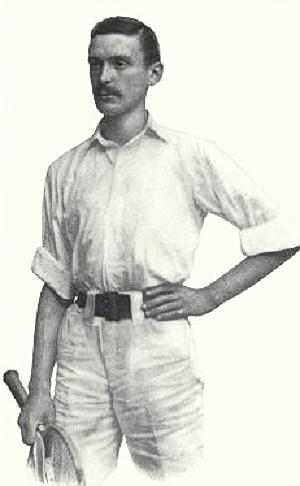
Laurent Riboulet

Laurent Riboulet (18 April 1871 – 4 September 1960) was a tennis player competing for France. He reached two singles finals at the Amateur French Championships, winning in 1893 over defending champion Jean Schopfer, and losing in 1895 to 1894 winner André Vacherot.
