= East of England Championships =

Defunct tennis tournament
- Event name: Felixstowe Open Lawn Tennis Tournament(1885-88); Eastern Counties Championships (1889-96); East of England Championships (1897–1967); East of England Open Championships (1968–72); East of England Tournament (1973); East of England Championships (1974–82)
- Founded: 1885; 140 years ago
- Abolished: 1983; 42 years ago
- Location: Felixstowe, Suffolk, England.
- Venue: Felixstowe LTC
- Surface: Grass

The East of England Championships also called the East of England Lawn Tennis Championships was a men's and women's grass court tennis tournament founded in 1885 as the Felixstowe Open Lawn Tennis Tournament. In 1889 the event had by this time become a regional level tournament that ran until 1983 when it lost its status as a senior international tour level event. However the championships are still being staged today as the East of England and an LTA British Tour (Premier Event).

== History ==
The Felixstowe Open Lawn Tennis Tournament hosted by the Felixstowe Cricket and Lawn Tennis Club became a regional level tour event called the East of England Championships in 1889. It was located Felixstowe, Suffolk, South East England. In 1890 the Felixstowe Open was revived as a stand alone event played alongside this one for two editions only until 1891.

The tournament was usually staged in mid-August, this later changed the middle or third week of July following the Wimbledon Championships. The East of England Championships ran for 98 years before it was discontinued in 1983 as a senior international tour level event. However the championships are still being staged today as the East of England an LTA British Tour (Premier Event).

This tournament became an interrelating regional event to the North of England Championships (f.1884), the South of England Championships (f.1881) and the West of England Championships (f.1881).

Notable winners of the men's singles championship title included Reggie Doherty (1906), Herbert Roper Barrett (1897-1899, 1901-1902, 1910), George Hillyard (1907-1908), Héctor Cattaruzza (1926), Jiro Yamagishi (1934-1935, 1937), George Worthington (1949), Jan Leschly (1957-1957), Mark Cox (1963, 1965-1967) and Saeed Meer (1977).

Former women's singles winners included Dorothea Douglass Chambers, (1902, 1906-1908, 1910), Geraldine Ramsey Beamish (1921-1922, 1926, 1933), Elsie Goldsack Pittman (1931-1932, 1938-1939), Jadwiga Jędrzejowska (1937, 1947), Shirley Bloomer (1954), Jill Blackman (1966), Patti Hogan (1967) and Greer Stevens (1973).

== Finals ==
=== Men's singles ===
Incomplete roll included:

| Year | Champion | Runner up | Score |
|---|---|---|---|
Felixstowe Open Lawn Tennis Tournament
| 1884 | (United Kingdom) Francis William Monement | (England) Maurice Welldon | 6-4, 1-6, 6-1 |
| 1885 | (United Kingdom) Francis William Monement (2) | (England) Herbert Davy Longe | 6-1, 6-0 |
| 1886 | (England) Alfred Penn Gaskell | (England) Charles Hoadley Ashe Ross | 5-6, 6-3, 6-3 |
| 1887 | (England) William Herbert Cohen | (England) Charles Sidney Cullingham | 6-3, 6-4 |
| 1888 | (England) Francis St. Barbe Haskett-Smith | (United Kingdom) Herbert William Kersey | 6-1, 9-7, 6-3 |
Eastern Counties Championships
| 1889 | (England) William Nevill Cobbold | (United Kingdom) Charles Gladstone Allen | 1-6, 6-5, 6-3 |
| 1890 | (United Kingdom) Charles Gladstone Allen | (United Kingdom) Francis Walter Eicke | 6-1, 1-6, 6-3 |
| 1891 | (United Kingdom) Roy Allen | (England) William Nevill Cobbold | 6-4, 6-2, 6-2 |
| 1892 | (United Kingdom) Roy Allen (2) | (United Kingdom) Charles Gladstone Allen | w.o. |
| 1893 | (United Kingdom) Roy Allen (3) | (United Kingdom) Herbert William Kersey | 6-4, 6-1, 10-8 |
East of England Championships
| 1894 | (United Kingdom) Ernest Wool Lewis | (England) Rupert L. Hamblin-Smith | 6-0, 6-2 |
| 1895 | (United Kingdom) Roy Allen (4) | (United Kingdom) Sydney Howard Smith | 6-4, 1-6, 7-5 |
| 1896 | (United Kingdom) Reginald Doherty | (United Kingdom) Roy Allen | 6-4, 8-6 |
| 1897 | (United Kingdom) Herbert Roper Barrett | (United Kingdom) Charles Gladstone Allen | 7-5, 7-5 |
| 1898 | (United Kingdom) Herbert Roper Barrett (2) | (United Kingdom) Roy Allen | 3-6, 6-3, 6-1 |
| 1899 | (United Kingdom) Herbert Roper Barrett (3) | (United Kingdom) Roy Allen | 3-6, 8-6, 6-3 |
| 1900 | (United Kingdom) Charles Percy Dixon | (United Kingdom) Roy Allen | 3-6, 6-3, 6-2 |
| 1901 | (United Kingdom) Herbert Roper Barrett (4) | (United Kingdom) Charles Percy Dixon | 7-5, 6-8, 6-1, 6-3 |
| 1902 | (United Kingdom) Herbert Roper Barrett (5) | (United Kingdom) Charles Smeathman Hatton | 6-3, 6-3, 6-4 |
| 1903 | (United Kingdom) Roy Allen (5) | (United Kingdom) George Greville | 6-3, 6-3, 6-4 |
| 1904 | (United Kingdom) Roy Allen (6) | (United Kingdom) Herbert Roper Barrett | 6-3, 6-1 |
| 1907 | (United Kingdom) George Hillyard | (United Kingdom) Alfred Beamish | 6-2, 6-2 |
| 1908 | (United Kingdom) George Hillyard (2) | (United Kingdom) Alfred Beamish | 6-1, 6-2 |
| 1909 | (United Kingdom) Alfred Ernest Beamish | (United Kingdom) Dunstan Rhodes | 6-1, 6-1, 6-2 |
| 1910 | (United Kingdom) Herbert Roper Barrett (6) | (United Kingdom) George Hillyard | 4-6, 6-2, 6-1, 6-3 |
| 1914/1918 | Not held (due to world war one) | | |
| 1919 | (United Kingdom) Charles Ernest Leonard Lyle | (United Kingdom) Basil Henty | 6-4, 6-2, 6-3 |
| 1920 | (United Kingdom) Hugh Walter Davies | (United Kingdom) Charles Ernest Leonard Lyle | 2-6, 6-3, 6-1 |
| 1921 | (United Kingdom) Thomas Bevan | (United Kingdom) Charles Ernest Leonard Lyle | 6-2, 6-4 |
| 1922 | (United Kingdom) Thomas Bevan (2) | (United Kingdom) Charles Ernest Leonard Lyle | 9-7, 4-6, 6-1 |
| 1923 | (United Kingdom) Sydney Jacob | (United Kingdom) Donald Greig | 6-4, 6-4, 6-3 |
| 1924 | (United Kingdom) Donald Greig | (United Kingdom) Charles Ernest Leonard Lyle | 6-4, 7-5, 6-2 |
| 1925 | (United Kingdom) Max Woosnam | (United Kingdom) Charles Kingsley | 3-6, 6-1, 6-2, 6-2 |
| 1926 | (Argentina) Héctor Américo Cattaruzza | (Argentina) Ronaldo Boyd | 6-4, 6-4, 8-6 |
| 1927 | (United Kingdom) Charles Herbert Kingsley | (United Kingdom) Max Woosnam | 6-2, 6-2, 6-3 |
| 1928 | (United Kingdom) Gordon Crole-Rees | (United Kingdom) Sydney Jacob | 3-6, 8-6, 6-2 |
| 1929 | (United Kingdom) Gordon Crole-Rees (2) | (United Kingdom) G.R. Ashton | 6-2, 6-2 |
| 1930 | (United Kingdom) Arthur W. Hill | (United Kingdom) Gordon Crole-Rees | 6-0, 6-4 |
| 1931 | (Austria) Franz Matejka | (Republic of Ireland) Charles Frederick Scroope | 6-2, 6-3 |
| 1932 | (United Kingdom) George Godsell | (Republic of Ireland) George S. Fletcher | 8-6, 6-3 |
| 1933 | (United Kingdom) Henry Scriven Burrows | (New Zealand) Alan Stedman | 6-4, 1-6, 6-4 |
| 1934 | (Japan) Jiro Yamagishi | (Switzerland) Charles Aeschlimann | 6-4, 6-0 |
| 1935 | (Japan) Jiro Yamagishi (2) | (Republic of Ireland) George Lyttleton Rogers | 6-3, 6-3 |
| 1936 | (United Kingdom) Richard (Dickie) Ritchie | (Japan) Eikichi Itoh | 6-4, 6-3 |
| 1937 | (Japan) Jiro Yamagishi (3) | (United Kingdom) Henry Billington | 6-1, 6-4 |
| 1938 | (United Kingdom) Lawrence Shaffi | (Italy) P. Martinelli | 2-6, 6-3, 6-2 |
| 1939 | (Romania) Constantin Tanacescu | (United Kingdom) Eric Filby | 4-6, 6-4, 6-3 |
| 1940/1946 | Not held (due to world war one) | | |
| 1947 | (New Zealand) Jeff Robson | (New Zealand) John Barry | 6-2, 6-4 |
| 1948 | (Hungary) Zoltan Katona | (Kenya) R.J.E. Mayers | 6-8, 6-0, 6-2 |
| 1949 | (United Kingdom) George Worthington | (India) Naresh Kumar | 6-2, 6-8, 6-4 |
| 1950 | (United Kingdom) Anthony (Tony) Starte | (United Kingdom) Bobby Nicholl | 2-6, 7-5, 6-1 |
| 1951 | (Denmark) Torben Ulrich | (United Kingdom) Derrick Leyland | 8-6, 6-2 |
| 1952 | (United Kingdom) Gerry Oakley | (Netherlands) Ivo Rinkel | 2-6, 6-4, 6-0 |
| 1953 | (United Kingdom) Geoff Ward | (United Kingdom) Nigel Lowe | 8-6, 6-3 |
| 1954 | (New Zealand) Jeff Robson (2) | (United Kingdom) Geoff Ward | 8-6, 9-7 |
| 1955 | (United Kingdom) Ivor Warwick | (Pakistan) Khwaja Saeed Hai | 14-16, 6-4, 6-4 |
| 1957 | (Denmark) Jan Leschly | (South Africa) Gordon Lawrence Talbot | 1-6, 6-2, 6-3 |
| 1958 | (Denmark) Jan Leschly (2) | (Denmark) Claus Storm Pallesen | 6-0, 6-0 |
| 1959 | (United States) John Kebble | (Pakistan) Tariq Afridi | 7-5, 6-1 |
| 1962 | (New Zealand) Robert G. Clarke | (United Kingdom) Mark Cox | 6-4, 6-3 |
| 1963 | (United Kingdom) Mark Cox | (United Kingdom) Geoff Bluett | 6-4, 6-3 |
| 1964 | (United Kingdom) Keith Wooldridge | (United Kingdom) Graham Stilwell | 6-2, 6-0 |
| 1965 | (United Kingdom) Mark Cox (2) | (United Kingdom) Gerald Battrick | 4-6, 7-5, 6-3 |
| 1966 | (United Kingdom) Mark Cox (3) | (New Zealand) Lew Gerrard | 5-7, 7-5, 6-4 |
| 1967 | (United Kingdom) Mark Cox (4) | (United Kingdom) Keith Wooldridge | 6-2, 6-4 |
| 1968 | (United Kingdom) Stanley Matthews | (United Kingdom) Keith Wooldridge | 10-12, 7-5, 7-5 |
Open era
East of England Open Championships
| 1969 | (Australia) Bob Giltinan | (South Africa) Byron Bertram | 8-6, 1-6, 8-6 |
| 1970 | (Australia) Bob Giltinan (2) | (Australia) Syd Ball | 7-5, 6-2 |
| 1971 | (Australia) Alvin Gardiner | (New Zealand) Jeff Simpson | 5-7, 7-5, 6-4 |
| 1972 | (United Kingdom) John Feaver | (South Africa) Tony Fawcett | 9-8, 6-4 |
| 1973 | (United States) Armistead Neely | (United States) Larry Parker | 5-7, 6-4, 8-6 |
East of England Championships
| 1974 | (South Africa) Willem Prinsloo | (United Kingdom) Dave Segal | 6-3, 6-0 |
| 1975 | (United Kingdom) Mike Collins | (Pakistan) Saeed Meer | 3-6, 6-3, 9-7 |
| 1976 | (United Kingdom) Mark Farrell | (Bermuda) Stephen Alger | 6-3, 6-4 |
| 1977 | (Pakistan) Saeed Meer | (Pakistan) Ali Kahn | 2-6, 6-4, 9-7 |
| 1978 | (United Kingdom) Willie Davies | (United States) Dean Mathias | 6-3, 6-4 |
| 1979 | (Netherlands) Rob Hak | (United Kingdom) Willie Davies | 9-8, 3-6, 6-3 |
| 1980 | (United Kingdom) John Paish | (United Kingdom) Willie Davies | 6-1, 6-4 |
| 1981 | (United Kingdom) Ian Currie | (United Kingdom) Martin Guntrip | w.o. |
| 1982 | (United Kingdom) Willie Davies (2) | (United Kingdom) John Paish | 3-6, 6-1, 6-2 |

=== Women's singles ===
(Incomplete roll)

| Year | Champion | Runner up | Score |
|---|---|---|---|
Felixstowe Open Lawn Tennis Tournament
| 1886 | (England) A. Ridley | (England) Helen Kersey | 6-1, 6-5 |
| 1887 | No women's event | | |
| 1888 | (England) Nellie Turner | (England) Freda Green | 4-6, 6-2, 10-8 |
Eastern Counties Championships
| 1889 | (England) Ivy Arbuthnot | (England) Helen Kersey | 6-3, 6-4 |
| 1890 | (England) Florence Noon Thompson | (England) Winifred Kersey | 6-3, 6-4 |
| 1891 | (England) Winifred Kersey | (England) C. Tidbury | 6-4, 6-2 |
| 1892 | No women's event | | |
| 1893 | (United Kingdom) Elsie Lane | (United Kingdom) Henrietta Horncastle | 6-3, 11-9 |
| 1894 | (United Kingdom) M. Burton | (United Kingdom) E. Burton | 6-3, retired. |
| 1895 | (United Kingdom) Elsie Lane (2) | (United Kingdom) A. Inge | 6-1, 6-3 |
| 1896 | (United Kingdom) Emma Ridding | (United Kingdom) Henrica Ridding | divided prizes |
East of England Championships
| 1897 | (United Kingdom) Mrs White | (United Kingdom) Henrietta Horncastle | 6-3, 6-3 |
| 1898 | (Wales) Edith Austin | (United Kingdom) Miss Tootell | 6-1, 6-2 |
| 1899 | (United Kingdom) Beryl Tulloch | (United Kingdom) Elsie Lane | 6-8, 6-2, 6-4 |
| 1900 | (United Kingdom) Beryl Tulloch (2) | (United Kingdom) Winifred Kersey | 4-6, 6-0, 6-2 |
| 1901 | (United Kingdom) Connie Wilson | (United Kingdom) Hilda Lane | 6-2, 6-4 |
| 1902 | (United Kingdom) Dorothea Douglass | (United Kingdom) Winifred Longhurst | 6-3, 4-6, 9-7 |
| 1903 | (United Kingdom) Alice Greene | (United Kingdom) Connie Wilson | 6-3, 3-6, 7-5 |
| 1904 | (United Kingdom) Connie Wilson (2) | (United Kingdom) Agnes Morton | 6-3, 6-3 |
| 1905 | (United Kingdom) Alice Greene (2) | (United Kingdom) Marion Colbatch-Clark | 8-6, 6-2 |
| 1906 | (United Kingdom) Dorothea Douglass (2) | (United Kingdom) Connie Wilson | 14-14, retired |
| 1907 | (United Kingdom) Dorothea Douglass Chambers (3) | (United Kingdom) Agnes Morton | 6-2, 6-2 |
| 1908 | (United Kingdom) Dorothea Douglass Chambers (4) | (United Kingdom) Agnes Morton | 6-1, 6-3 |
| 1909 | (United Kingdom) Agnes Morton | (United Kingdom) Mary Gray Curtis-Whyte | 6-0, 6-1 |
| 1910 | (United Kingdom) Dorothea Douglass Chambers (5) | (United Kingdom) M. Messom | 6-0, 6-2 |
| 1911 | (United Kingdom) Dorothy Holman | (United Kingdom) Winifred McNair | 6-3, 3-6, 6-2 |
| 1912 | (United Kingdom) Agnes Morton (2) | (United Kingdom) Dorothea Douglass Chambers | 5-7, 6-3, retired |
| 1913 | (United Kingdom) Winifred McNair | (United States) Elizabeth Ryan | 7-5, 7-5 |
| 1914-18 | Not held (due to World War I) | | |
| 1919 | (United Kingdom) Muriel Ledger Hextall | (United Kingdom) Mrs F.W. Hodges | 6-4, 4-6, 6-2 |
| 1920 | (United Kingdom) Mabel Davey Clayton | (United Kingdom) Phyllis Carr Satterthwaite | 6-4, 6-3 |
| 1921 | (United Kingdom) Geraldine Ramsey Beamish | (United Kingdom) Mabel Davey Clayton | 6-3, 7-5 |
| 1922 | (United Kingdom) Geraldine Ramsey Beamish (2) | (United Kingdom) Mabel Davey Clayton | 6-0, 6-2 |
| 1923 | (United Kingdom) Mabel Davey Clayton (2) | (United Kingdom) Geraldine Ramsey Beamish | 1-6, 6-2, 10-8 |
| 1924 | (United Kingdom) Ermyntrude Harvey | (United Kingdom) Claire Beckingham | 6-4, 6-1 |
| 1925 | (United Kingdom) Claire Beckingham | (United Kingdom) Geraldine Ramsey Beamish | 3-6, 6-3, 6-3 |
| 1926 | (United Kingdom) Geraldine Ramsey Beamish (3) | (United Kingdom) Elsie Goldsack | 6-4, 6-2 |
| 1927 | (United Kingdom) Joan Ridley | (United Kingdom) Geraldine Ramsey Beamish | 6-3, 4-6, 7-5 |
| 1928 | (United Kingdom) Joan Ridley (2) | (United Kingdom) Geraldine Ramsey Beamish | 6-4, 6-3 |
| 1929 | (United Kingdom) Joan Ridley (3) | (United Kingdom) Elsie Goldsack | 5-7, 6-3, 6-3 |
| 1930 | (United Kingdom) Nancy Lyle | (United Kingdom) Elsie Goldsack Pittman | 6-4, 6-3 |
| 1931 | (United Kingdom) Elsie Goldsack Pittman | (United Kingdom) Joan Ridley | 6-2, 6-2 |
| 1932 | (United Kingdom) Elsie Goldsack Pittman (2) | (United Kingdom) Ermyntrude Harvey | 6-0, 8-6 |
| 1933 | (United Kingdom) Geraldine Ramsey Beamish (4) | (United Kingdom) Lucy Bond Pretty | 6-1, 6-1 |
| 1934 | (United Kingdom) Freda Scott | (United Kingdom) Joan Ridley | 12-10, 8-8, retired |
| 1935 | (India) Leila Row | (United Kingdom) Freda Scott | 6-3, 6-2 |
| 1936 | (South Africa) Audrey de Smidt Allister | (United Kingdom) Nancy Palmer | 6-2, 6-2 |
| 1937 | (Poland) Jadwiga Jędrzejowska | (United Kingdom) Audrey Wright | 6-1, 6-4 |
| 1938 | (United Kingdom) Elsie Goldsack Pittman (3) | (United Kingdom) Rosemary Thomas | 7-5, 9-7 |
| 1939 | (United Kingdom) Elsie Goldsack Pittman (4) | (United Kingdom) Iris Hutchings | 2-6, 6-1, 6-3 |
| 1940-46 | Not held (due to World War I) | | |
| 1947 | (Poland) Jadwiga Jędrzejowska (2) | (Sweden) Bibi Gullbrandsson | 6-1, 6-2 |
| 1948 | (United Kingdom) Jean Nicoll-Bostock | (United Kingdom) Jean Quertier | 11-9, 6-2 |
| 1949 | (United Kingdom) Patricia Ward | (United Kingdom) Joey Physick David | 7-5, 6-2 |
| 1950 | (United Kingdom) Margaret Emerson | (United Kingdom) Anne Shilcock | 6-2, 6-2 |
| 1951 | (United Kingdom) Anne Shilcock | (United Kingdom) Joey Physick Lloyd | 1-6, 6-4, 6-4 |
| 1952 | (United Kingdom) Jean Quertier Rinkel | (United States) Baba Lewis | 6-1, 4-6, 6-2 |
| 1953 | (South Africa) Lucille van der Westhuizen | (United Kingdom) D. Midgley | 6-0, 6-3 |
| 1954 | (United Kingdom) Shirley Bloomer | (New Zealand) Heather Redwood Robson | 6-3, 6-1 |
| 1955 | (United Kingdom) Bea Walter | (United Kingdom) Anthea Gibb | 6-4, 6-2 |
| 1956 | (New Zealand) Elaine Becroft | (United Kingdom) Christine Truman | 6-4, 3-6, 6-4 |
| 1957 | (United Kingdom) Patricia Hird | (Denmark) Inge Overgaard | 6-2, 6-0 |
| 1958 | (United Kingdom) A. Hardwick | (Denmark) Pia Balling | 7-5, 6-2 |
| 1959 | (United Kingdom) Sheila Griffin Bramley | (United Kingdom) J. Stedman | 6-3 6-2 |
| 1960 | (United Kingdom) Sheila Griffin Bramley (2) | (United Kingdom) Elaine Watson Shenton | divided title |
| 1961 | (United Kingdom) J. Watts | (United Kingdom) Sheila Griffin Bramley | 7-5, 1-6, 6-3 |
| 1962 | (New Zealand) Judy Davidson | (New Zealand) Elizabeth Terry | 6-2, 6-3 |
| 1963 | (United Kingdom) Alison Stroud | (United Kingdom) Mrs S. Stevenson | 6-4, 4-6, 6-4 |
| 1964 | (United Kingdom) Elizabeth Starkie | (United Kingdom) Deidre Catt | 9-7, 4-6, 6-4 |
| 1965 | (United Kingdom) Rita Bentley | (United Kingdom) Elizabeth Starkie | 7-5, 3-6, 6-2 |
| 1966 | (Australia) Jill Blackman | (South Africa) Laura Rossouw | 6-3, 6-4 |
| 1967 | (United States) Patti Hogan | (United States) Lynn Abbes | 6-2, 6-3 |
| 1968 | (United Kingdom) Janice Townsend | (Australia) Jenny Staley Hoad | 11-9, 6-1 |
Open era
East of England Open Championships
| 1969 | (South Africa) Anita van Deventer | (South Africa) Brenda Kirk | 6-2, 6-4 |
| 1970 | (United Kingdom) Corinne Molesworth | (United Kingdom) Robin Blakelock Lloyd | 2-6, 6-4, 6-2 |
| 1971 | (United Kingdom) Jill Cooper | (United Kingdom) Corinne Molesworth | 6-3, 6-2 |
| 1972 | (Australia) Patricia Coleman | (Australia) Wendy Turnbull | 7-5, 8-6 |
| 1973 | (South Africa) Greer Stevens | (United Kingdom) Diane Riste | 6-2, 6-1 |
East of England Championships
| 1974 | (Australia) Gwen Stirton | (Australia) Lois Raymond | 6-3 7-5 |
| 1975 | (United Kingdom) Lindsay Blachford | (United Kingdom) Annette Coe | 2-6, 6-2, 6-2 |
| 1976 | (United Kingdom) J. Wilton | (United Kingdom) Julia Lloyd | 6-3, 7-5 |
| 1977 | (United Kingdom) Linda Geeves | (United Kingdom) Jill Cottrell | 6-2, 6-4 |
| 1978 | (United Kingdom) Deborah Stewart | (Israel) Hagit Zubary | 6-2, 9-7 |
| 1979 | (United States) Phyllis Blackwell | (United States) E. Sharp | 6-4, 6-3 |
| 1980 | (Australia) Elizabeth Little | (United Kingdom) Sonia Davies | 6-1, 6-1 |
| 1981 | (United Kingdom) Deborah Stewart (2) | (United Kingdom) Jane Plackett | 6-3, 6-3 |
| 1982 | (United Kingdom) Joy Tacon | (New Zealand) Belinda Cordwell | 4-6, 6-3, 6-2 |
| 1983 | (United Kingdom) Jane Langstaff | (Hong Kong) Paulette Moreno | 7-6, 6-0 |

== Tournament records ==
- Most Men's Singles Titles– (United Kingdom) Herbert Roper Barrett & (United Kingdom) Roy Allen (6)
- Most Men's Singles Finals– (United Kingdom) Roy Allen (10)
- Most Women's Singles Titles– (United Kingdom) Dorothea Douglass Chambers & (United Kingdom) Geraldine Ramsey Beamish & (United Kingdom) Elsie Goldsack Pittman (4)
- Most Women's Singles Finals– (United Kingdom) Geraldine Ramsey Beamish (8)

== Notes ==
In the late 1880s an East of England tournament was established in Filey, North Yorkshire, but was predominantly a local tennis meeting only.

== Event names ==
- Felixstowe Open Lawn Tennis Tournament (1885-87)
- Eastern Counties Championships (1889-96)
- East of England Championships (1897–1967)
- East of England Open Championships (1968–72)
- East of England Tournament (1973)
- East of England Championships (1974–82)

== Sources ==
- Daily Mail Year Book. (1966) London: Associated Newspapers Groups.
- Events. clubspark.lta.org.uk. Felixstowe Lawn Tennis Club.
- The Ipswich Journal. (14 August 1886) Ipswich, Suffolk, England.
- The Sketch: (1924) A Journal of Art and Actuality. Ingram brothers. 110: 127.
