= Suffolk Championships =

Defunct tennis tournament
- Event name: Saxmundham Lawn Tennis Club Tournament (1883-93); Suffolk Championships (1894–1968)
- Tour: Pre-Open era tour (1883-1968)
- Founded: 1883 f. 1893
- Abolished: 1968
- Editions: 85
- Location: Saxmundham
- Surface: Grass

The Suffolk Championships was an open international tennis tournament for both men and women held at Saxmundham, Suffolk, England founded in 1883 as the Saxmundham Lawn Tennis Tournament. In 1893 it was elevated to a county-level event and renamed as the Suffolk County Championships. The championships ran until 1968 when it ceased to be part of ILTC worldwide tennis circuit.

== History ==
On 12 August 1883 an annual open Saxmundham Lawn Tennis Tournament was established at Hurts Hall Park, Saxmundham, Suffolk, England that ran until 1893. that was a featured event on the Men's 1883 Tennis Tour. The winner of the first men's singles title was William Bolding Monement who defeated J.M. Wilkinson in straight sets.

Also in August 1883 an annual Framlingham Tennis Tournament was also established by the Framlingham LTC, and played on the Hurts Hill Courts, Hurts Hill Park, Saxmundham, Suffolk, England that ran until 1914. It was not staged throughout World War One. It resumed in 1919 and that event also carried the title of Suffolk Championships for that year, and in 1922. The Framlingham event continued to be held at Hurts Hall Park, Saxmundham until 1936, when it was moved to the tennis courts of the Framlingham College Grounds at Framlingham (a distance of 17 miles) until the start of World War Two.

In 1884 the Saxmundham Lawn Tennis Tournament women's singles event was won by Miss M. Marriott who beat Miss G. Rant in two straight sets. In 1893 the event was renamed the Suffolk Championships, the first official winners of the men's single title was Mr Rupert L. Hamblin-Smith, and the women's singles tile Miss Alice Simpson Pickering.

From 1915 the championships being organised and staged by the Saxmundham LTC were not held until 1920 due to World War One. From 1923 until the out break of World War Two in 1939 championships continued to be held in Saxmundham. After World War Two the Framlingham LTC took over responsibility for organising the Suffolk Championships at Framlingham College until 1983. The Framlingham Open Lawn Tennis Tournament a distinct event was staged alongside this event until 1981. The event is still played today under its original name, but is no longer a senior tour level event.

In the men's singles event Herbert Roper Barrett was the most successful player he won 17 titles, out of 18 finals between 1898 and 1921 which remains today an all time record for most finals at a single tennis tournament.

== Finals ==
=== Men's singles ===
Incomplete roll included:

Year	Champions	Runners-up	Score
Saxmundham LTC Tournament
1883	(United Kingdom) William Bolding Monement	(United Kingdom) M. Wilkinson	6-1, 6-1
1884	(United Kingdom) Francis William Monement	(England) Maurice Welldon	6-4, 1-6, 6-1
1885	(England) Charles Richard Longe	(England) Herbert Davy Longe	6-1, 6-0
1886	(England) William Herbert Cohen	(England) Oswald Milne	7-5, 7-5
1887	(England) Benjamin Arthur Cohen	(England) George K. Barnabas Norman	3-6, 6-4, 6-2
1888	(England) George K. Barnabas Norman	(United Kingdom) A. Hewetson	6-1, 6-4
1889	(England) Lionel James Easton	(England) John David Wallich	6-4, 5-6, 6-3
1890	(United Kingdom) Charles Gladstone Allen	(United Kingdom) Roy Allen	7-5, ret.
1891	(United Kingdom) Charles Gladstone Allen	(United Kingdom) Roy Allen	w.o.
1892	(United Kingdom) Mr. G. Williams	(United Kingdom) Charles Gladstone Allen	?
Suffolk County Championships
1893	(United Kingdom) Mr. G. Williams	(United Kingdom) Roy Allen	6-4, 6-1, 10-8
1894	(England) Rupert L. Hamblin-Smith	(England) Robert Baldock Scott	6-2, 6-2, 6-5
1895	(United Kingdom) Roy Allen	(United Kingdom) Sydney Howard Smith	5-7, 6-3, 6-3, ret.
1896	(United Kingdom) Roy Allen (2)	(England) Rupert L. Hamblin-Smith	6-0, 6-2
1897	(United Kingdom) Laurie Doherty	(United Kingdom) Jack Ridding	6-3, 8-6, 4-6, 6-1
1898	(United Kingdom) Herbert Roper Barrett	(United Kingdom) Charles Percy Dixon	6-2, 6-4, 6-3
1899	(United Kingdom) Herbert Roper Barrett (2)	(United Kingdom) Charles Percy Dixon	6-3, 6-2, 6-3
1900	(United Kingdom) Charles Percy Dixon	(United Kingdom) Roy Allen	7-5, 5-7, 7-5, 6-4
1901	(United Kingdom) Charles Percy Dixon (2)	(United Kingdom) Charles O. S. Hatton	6-1, 5-7, 6-0, 6-2
1902	(United Kingdom) Herbert Roper Barrett (3)	(United Kingdom) Charles Percy Dixon	6-2, 6-3, 4-6, 8-6
1903	(United Kingdom) Roy Allen (3)	(United Kingdom) Herbert Roper Barrett	6-4, 1-6, 6-1, 3-6, 6-2
1904	(United Kingdom) Herbert Roper Barrett (4)	(United Kingdom) Roy Allen	6-4, 6-4
1905	(United Kingdom) Herbert Roper Barrett (5)	(United Kingdom) Roy Allen	6-2, 6-3, 6-1
1906	(United Kingdom) Herbert Roper Barrett (6)	(United Kingdom) C.E. Hunter	6-4, 6-1, 6-2
1907	(United Kingdom) Herbert Roper Barrett (7)	(United Kingdom) Alfred Beamish	6-4, 6-2, 6-2
1908	(United Kingdom) Herbert Roper Barrett (8)	(United Kingdom) Frank Roe	6-1, 6-0
1909	(United Kingdom) Herbert Roper Barrett (9)	(United Kingdom) Charles S. Gordon-Smith	6-1, 6-1, 6-1
1910	(United Kingdom) Herbert Roper Barrett (10)	(United Kingdom) Oswald Charles Johnson	6-3, 6-4, 6-2
1914/1918	Not held (due to World War One)		
Suffolk Championships
1919	(United Kingdom) Herbert Roper Barrett (11)	(United Kingdom) Frank Herbert Jarvis	6-2, 6-2
1920	(United Kingdom) Herbert Roper Barrett (12)	(United Kingdom) Hugh Davies	6-0, 6-2
1921	(United Kingdom) Herbert Roper Barrett (13)	(United States) Axel Berg Gravem	6-2, 6-1
1922	(United Kingdom) Randolph Lycett	(United States) Axel Berg Gravem	6-2, 6-1
1923	(United Kingdom) Randolph Lycett (2)	(United Kingdom) Michael Drone	6-1, 6-0
1924	(United Kingdom) Randolph Lycett (3)	(United Kingdom) Donald McNeil Greig	7-5, 7-5
1925	(United Kingdom) Randolph Lycett (4)	(United Kingdom) Bunny Austin	6-3, 6-3
1926	(United Kingdom) Bunny Austin	(United Kingdom) Randolph Lycett	6-2, 9-9 ret.
1927	(United Kingdom) Randolph Lycett (5)	(United Kingdom) Colonel Penn	6-2, 6-1
1928	(United Kingdom) Randolph Lycett (6)	(United Kingdom) F.C. Dawnay	8-6, 6-2
1929	(United Kingdom) Norman Horace Latchford	(United Kingdom) P.H. Sidney	6-4, 6-2
1930	(United Kingdom) Norman Horace Latchford (2)	(United Kingdom) M. Barrington	6-3, 6-4
1931	(United Kingdom) Norman Horace Latchford (3)	(United Kingdom) Victor Alexander Cazalet	7-5, 3-6, 6-2
1932	(United Kingdom) Jimmy Redall	(Republic of Ireland) Brian Finnigan	2-6, 6-4, 6-4
1933	(United Kingdom) Jimmy Redall (2)	(United Kingdom) Charles Edgar Hare	6-4, 5-7, 6-2
1934	(United Kingdom) Jimmy Redall (2)	(United Kingdom) Cecil H. Elkington-Betts	6-4, 5-7, 6-2
1935	(United Kingdom) Charles Edgar Hare	(United Kingdom) Jimmy Redall	13-11, 6-1
1936	(United Kingdom) Murray Deloford	(New Zealand) E.A. Pearce	6-2, 6-1
1937	(Republic of China (1912–1949)) Choy Wai-Chuen	(United Kingdom) Harold A. Hare	6-1, 9-7
1938	(United Kingdom) Jack Piercy	(United Kingdom) John T. Bouverie Leader	6-3, 6-0
1939	(United Kingdom) Gordon Fitt	(United Kingdom) John T. Bouverie Leader	6-0, 6-4
1940/1946	Not held (due to world war one)		
1947	(United Kingdom) Gordon Fitt (2)	(United Kingdom) Raymond Victor Fontes	7-5, 4-6, 6-0
1948	(United Kingdom) C.M. Rudland	(United Kingdom) A.H. Boar	6-2, 6-2
1949	(Sweden) Percy Rosberg	(United Kingdom) Teddy Bostock	6-3, 7-5
1950	(United Kingdom) V. Schmidt	(Sweden) Bo Andersson	4-6, 6-4, 6-2
1951	(United Kingdom) Freddie Beer	(Sweden) L.E. Ahlberg	9-7, 12-10
1952	(United Kingdom) L. Garfoe	(United Kingdom) Robert (Bobby) Nicholl	2-6, 8-6, 6-3
Open era
1968	(United Kingdom) J.S. Wootton	(United States) Dick Knight	6-3, 9-11, 6-3

=== Women's singles ===
(Incomplete roll)

Year	Champions	Runners-up	Score
Saxmundham LTC Tournament
1883	(United Kingdom) Georgina Rant	(United Kingdom) Laura Davy	6-0, 6-2
1884	(United Kingdom) May Marriott	(United Kingdom) Georgina Rant	6-1, 6-1
1885	(United Kingdom) Georgina Rant (2)	(Wales) Edith Austin	4-6, 6-3, 6-3
1886	(United Kingdom) Georgina Rant(3)	(United Kingdom) A. Forster	6-4, 6-5
1887	(England) Kate Barkley	(Wales) Edith Austin	6-2, 6-4
1888	(England) Miss Norman	(Wales) Edith Austin	6-1, 6-2
1889	(United Kingdom) Winifred Kersey	(United Kingdom) Helen Kersey	6-1. 6-5
1890	(United Kingdom) Edith Coleridge Cole	(United Kingdom) Alice Parr	6-4, 6-2
1891	(United Kingdom) Winifred Kersey (2)	(England) Miss Carter	6-2, 4-6, 6-2
Suffolk County Championships
1893	(United Kingdom) Elsie Lane	(United Kingdom) Henrietta Horncastle	6-3, 6-1
1894	(United Kingdom) Alice Simpson Pickering	(United Kingdom) Alice Parr	6-4, 3-6, 6-4
1895	(United Kingdom) Elsie Lane	(United Kingdom) Alice Simpson Pickering	6-2, 7-5
1896	(United Kingdom) Henrietta Horncastle	(United Kingdom) Henrica Ridding	0-6, 7-5, 6-3
1897	(United Kingdom) Mrs Horace White	(United Kingdom) Constance Bloxsome	6-4, 6-4
1898	(United Kingdom) Henrietta Horncastle	(United Kingdom) Miss Bush	1-6, 8-6, 7-5
1899	(United Kingdom) Beryl Tulloch	(United Kingdom) Mrs A. Paine	6-2, retd.
1900	(United Kingdom) Winifred Longhurst	(United Kingdom) Beryl Tulloch	2-6, 6-3, 6-3
1901	(United Kingdom) Winifred Longhurst (2)	(United Kingdom) Ruth Dyas Durlacher	6-3, 3-6, 7-5
1902	(United Kingdom) Connie Wilson	(United Kingdom) Agnes Morton	7-5, 6-3
1903	(United Kingdom) Connie Wilson (2)	(United Kingdom) Edith Austin Greville	6-4, 6-2
1904	(United Kingdom) Connie Wilson (3)	(United Kingdom) Alice Greene	6-2, 7-5
1905	(United Kingdom) Miss Tootell	(United Kingdom) Mrs C.E. Hunter	6-0, 6-3
1906	(United Kingdom) Agnes Morton	(United Kingdom) Connie Wilson	walkover
1907	(United Kingdom) Agnes Morton (2)	(United Kingdom) E. Boyce	6-0, 6-2
1908	(United Kingdom) Agnes Morton (3)	(United Kingdom) E. Boyce	6-3, 6-2
1909	(United Kingdom) Agnes Morton (4)	(United Kingdom) Dorothy Holman	6-1, 6-1
1910	(United Kingdom) Agnes Morton (5)	(United Kingdom) Madeline Fisher O'Neill	6-1, 6-2
1911	(United Kingdom) Agnes Morton (6)	(United Kingdom) Daisy Clark Kercheval-Hole	6-1 6-4
1912	(United Kingdom) Agnes Morton (7)	(United States) Elizabeth Ryan	divided prizes
1913	(United Kingdom) Agnes Morton (8)	(United States) Elizabeth Ryan	8-6, 6-0
1914	(United Kingdom) Agnes Morton (9)	(United Kingdom) Geraldine Ramsey Beamish	6-1, 6-4
1915/1918	Not held (due to world war one)		
Suffolk Championships
1919	(United Kingdom) Phyllis Carr Satterthwaite	(United Kingdom) Dorothy Shepherd	6-4, 6-0
1920	(United Kingdom) Dorothy Kemmis-Betty	(United Kingdom) Mrs J.E. Vere Elliott	6-1, 7-5
1921	(United Kingdom) Dorothy Holman	(United Kingdom) E. Tanner	5-7, 6-3, 6-2
1922	(United Kingdom) Dorothy Holman (2)	(United Kingdom) Ermyntrude Harvey	6-1, 6-1
1923	(United Kingdom) Dorothy Holman (3)	(United Kingdom) Ermyntrude Harvey	1-6, 6-3, 6-2
1924	(United Kingdom) Ermyntrude Harvey	(United Kingdom) Joan Ridley	4-6, 6-2, 6-2
1925	(United Kingdom) Joan Austin Lycett	(United Kingdom) Elieen Bennett	7-5, 8-6
1926	(United Kingdom) Ermyntrude Harvey (2)	(United Kingdom) Betty Nuthall	6-4, 6-3
1927	(United Kingdom) Joan Austin Lycett	(United Kingdom) Dorothy Biddle	5-7, 6-4, 7-5
1928	(United Kingdom) Ermyntrude Harvey (3)	(United Kingdom) Joan Austin Lycett	6-1, 6-3
1929	(United Kingdom) C. Turner	(United Kingdom) Mrs P. Carthew	10-8, 7-5
1930	(United Kingdom) Freda Scott	(United Kingdom) Ermyntrude Harvey	6-8, 7-5, 6-2
1931	(United Kingdom) Freda Scott (2)	(United Kingdom) Ermyntrude Harvey	9-7, 6-3
1932	(United Kingdom) Freda Scott (3)	(United Kingdom) Dorothy Biddle de Winton	6-0, 6-1
1933	(United Kingdom) Dorothy Biddle de Winton	(United Kingdom) M. Cleland	6-4, 11-9
1934	(United Kingdom) Nancy Kidson	(United Kingdom) Freda Scott	6-2, 6-0
1935	(United Kingdom) Joan Ridley	(United Kingdom) Nancy Kidson Fontes	6-2, 6-1
1936	(United Kingdom) Nancy Kidson Fontes (2)	(United Kingdom) Nancy Palmer Edwards	10-8, 7-5
1937	(United Kingdom) Mrs H.J. Edwards	(United Kingdom) J. Rudland	6-2, 7-9, 6-1
1938	(United Kingdom) Freda Scott Underwood (3)	(United Kingdom) Betty Batt	8-6, 6-3
1940/1945	Not held (due to world war one)		
1947	(United Kingdom) D. Gaskell	(United Kingdom) D. Sutcliffe	6-8, 6-2, 6-4
1948	(United Kingdom) Jean Nicoll Bostock	(United Kingdom) Wendy Stork	6-1, 6-2
1949	(United Kingdom) Wendy Stork	(United Kingdom) D. Gaskell	6-4, 6-2
1950	(United Kingdom) Joan Ross-Dilley	(United Kingdom) Andrea Ross-Dilley	11-9, 9-11, 6-3
1951	(United Kingdom) Joan Ross-Dilley (2)	(United Kingdom) Andrea Ross-Dilley	8-10, 6-4, 9-7
1952	(United Kingdom) D E Gaskell	(United Kingdom) Mrs T E Burrows	5-7, 6-1, 11-9
1953	(United Kingdom) Elaine Watson	(United Kingdom) Gladys Southwell Lines	6-0, 6-4
1954	(United Kingdom) C. Vincent	(United Kingdom) D. Gaskell	7-5, 6-4
1955	(United Kingdom) Valerie Pitt	(United Kingdom) Christine Truman	6-1, 0-6, 6-2
1956	(United Kingdom) Jill Rook	(United Kingdom) Christine Truman	6-4, 7-5
1957	(United Kingdom) Jill Rook (2)	(United Kingdom) Jean Nicoll-Bostock	1-6, 6-4, 6-4
1958	(Australia) Norma Marsh	(United Kingdom) Jean Knight	6-2, 6-3
1959	(United Kingdom) Joan Stedman	(United Kingdom) Mrs A. Robinson	4-6, 6-4, 6-3
1960	(United Kingdom) Vivienne Cox	(United Kingdom) Honor Durose	6-2, 6-2
1961	(Australia) Margaret H. O'Donnell	(United Kingdom) Vivienne Cox	6-1, 6-4
1962	(New Zealand) Elizabeth Terry	(United Kingdom) B. Nicholson	6-1, 6-1
1963	(United Kingdom) Robin Blakelock-Lloyd	(United Kingdom) Nell Truman	6-2, 6-2
1964	(United Kingdom) Nell Truman	(United States) Janet French	6-2 6-2
1965	(United Kingdom) Stephanie Percival	(United States) Janet French	7-5, 6-4
1966	(United Kingdom) Joan Stedman	(United Kingdom) Penny Hardgrave	4-6, 6-4, 6-2
Open era
1969	(United Kingdom) Marjorie Love	(Republic of Ireland) Sue Minford	1-6, 6-4, 6-2
1970	(United Kingdom) Shirley Bloomer Brasher	(United Kingdom) Penny Hardgrave	10-8, 6-1
1973	(United Kingdom) Diane (Di)Riste	(United Kingdom) Mrs L. Fulcher	6-2, 6-2
1974	(United Kingdom) Marjorie Love (2)	(United Kingdom) Julia Lloyd	6-2, 6-2
1975	(United Kingdom) Julia Lloyd	(United Kingdom) R. Hassell	3-6 6-1, 6-2
1976	(United Kingdom) Julia Lloyd	(United Kingdom) Jacqueline Boothman	6-2, 6-2
1977	(Republic of Ireland) Jo Sheridan	(United Kingdom) Mrs L. Fulcher	3-6 6-1 6-1
1978	(United Kingdom) Elizabeth Locke	(United Kingdom) Mrs G. Chambers	6-1, 6-2
1979	(United Kingdom) J. Lilley	(United Kingdom) A. Loughrey	7-5, 6-3
1980	(New Zealand) Christa Pickwick	(United Kingdom) A. Loughrey	6-0, 6-2
1981	(United Kingdom) Z. Kent	(United Kingdom) J. Lilley	6-0, 7-6
1983	(United Kingdom) J. Stamper	(United Kingdom) A. Loughrey	6-7, 6-1, 10-8
