= Isle of Man Championships =

British tennis tournament

Defunct tennis tournament
- Tour: LTA Circuit (1890-1912), ILTF Circuit (1913-1973)
- Founded: 1890; 135 years ago
- Abolished: 1963; 62 years ago
- Location: Castletown; Douglas
- Surface: Grass

The Isle of Man Championships was a combined national level grass court tennis tournament first played in Castletown, Isle of Man in 1890. Also known as the Manx Lawn Tennis Championships, the tournament was held in various locations and ran annually until 1963.
