= Colchester Championship =

British tennis tournament

Defunct tennis tournament
- Tour: LTA Circuit (1889-1912), ILTF Circuit (1913-1923)
- Founded: 1889; 136 years ago
- Abolished: 1923; 102 years ago
- Location: Colchester, Essex, England
- Venue: Colchester Lawn Tennis Club
- Surface: Grass

The Colchester Championship was a men's and women's grass court tennis tournament founded in 1889. The tournament was organised by the Colchester Lawn Tennis Club, Colchester, Essex, England. It was played annually until 1923 when it was discontinued as part of the ILTF Circuit.

== History ==
The Colchester Championship was first held in August 1889 the men's singles was won by George Kensit Barnabas Norman. The tournament was organised by the Colchester Lawn Tennis Club, Colchester, Essex, England. It was played annually until 1923 when it was discontinued as part of the ILTF Circuit. The England international Roy Allen won most men's singles titles with three consecutive wins between 1893 and 1895. The final men's tournament was won by six time Wimbledon singles competitor and men's doubles quarter finalist in 1921 Lawrence Francis Davin.
