= Winifred Longhurst =

English tennis player (1873–1958)

- Full name: Winifred Mary Arden Longhurst
- Country (sports): GBR
- Born: 1873 Worcester, Worcestershire, England
- Died: 24 November 1958 (age 85) Budleigh Salterton Devon, England
- Turned pro: 1892 (amateur tour)
- Retired: 1921

Singles
- Career titles: 29

Grand Slam singles results
- Wimbledon: QF (1902, 1904, 1906, 1912)

Winifred Mary Arden Longhurst (1873 – 24 November 1958) was a British tennis player. She was a four time quarter finalist in singles in the Wimbledon Championships in 1902, 1904, 1906 and 1912. She was active from 1892 until 1921 and won 29 career singles titles.

== Career ==
Longhurst was born in 1878 in Worcester, Worcestershire, England. She began her amateur tennis career in 1892. In major tournaments she competed at Wimbledon seven times in the women's all-comers singles event where she was 4 time Wimbledon quarter finalist (1902, 1904, 1906, 1912).

Her major career singles titles include winning national and international level events including the Irish Championships three times from 1904 to 1906, the Welsh Championships two times from 1901 to 1902, the Austrian Championships in 1903 and the Scottish Championships in 1904.

Her other singles titles at regional level tournaments include winning the Midland Counties Championships in 1895 and 1902. At county level events she won the Suffolk County Championships which she won twice in 1901 and 1902. She won the Essex Championships in 1902. She won one time titles at the Sussex Championships in 1905.

She was also a finalist at the East of England Championships in 1902, the West Sussex Championships in 1903, the Kent Coast Championships in 1904 and 1905, the Cinque Ports Championships in 1905, the Worcestershire Championships in 1908, the Warwickshire Championships in 1909, the Shropshire Championships in 1911, the Carlisle Open and Derbyshire Championships in 1913. Winifred was actively playing tennis until as late as 1921 when she was a ladies doubles finalist at the Worcestershire Championships partnering with Gladys Foster.

== Style of play ==
The former tennis player turned The Daily Telegraph sports journalist Arthur Wallis Myers gives an account of her playing style in his book.

Miss Winifred Longhurst is a steadily improving player, with an equipment of powerful strokes and possessed of sound judgement. She is best in singles and is now the Champion of Wales, Essex, and the Midlands. Before that, Miss Longhurst held the Suffolk championship for two years.:

— V: Players of the Present, Lawn Tennis at Home and Abroad (1903). Charles Scribner's sons. New York. pp. 182-183.

== Career finals ==
=== Singles titles (29) ===
Category + (Titles)
National (7)
Regular (22)

Result	No.	Date	Tournament	Location	Surface	Opponent	Score
Win	1.	1892	Midland Counties Championships	Edgbaston	Grass	(United Kingdom) Edith Longhurst	divided prizes
Win	2.	1895	Midland Counties Championships (2)	Edgbaston	Grass	(United Kingdom) C. Jones	4-6, 6–4, 7-5
Win	3.	1896	Llandudno Open	Craigside	Grass	(United Kingdom) Emma Ridding	6-0, 6-2
Win	4.	1899	Torquay Lawn Tennis Tournmament	Torquay	Grass	(United Kingdom) K. Hughes	6-2, 6-1
Win	5.	1900	Torquay Lawn Tennis Tournmament (2)	Torquay	Grass	(England) Miss Smythe	6-2, 6-2
Win	6.	1900	Suffolk County Championships	Saxmundham	Grass	(United Kingdom) Beryl Tulloch	2-6, 6–3, 6-3
Win	7.	1901	Torquay Lawn Tennis Tournmament (3)	Torquay	Grass	(England) Miss Collett	6-1, 6-1
Win	8.	1901	Welsh Championships	Penarth	Grass	(United Kingdom) M. Golding	6–1, 4–6, 7–5
Win	9.	1901	Suffolk County Championships (2)	Saxmundham	Grass	(United Kingdom) Ruth Durlacher	6-3, 3–6, 7-5
Win	10.	1901	Welsh Championships (2)	Penarth	Grass	(United Kingdom) Constance Hill	8–6, 4–6, 6–4
Win	11.	1902	Cinque Ports Championships	Folkestone	Grass	(United Kingdom) Edith Greville	6-3, 6-1
Win	12.	1902	Midland Counties Championships (3)	Edgbaston	Grass	(United Kingdom) Muriel Robb	7-5, 7-5
Win	13.	1902	Boulogne International Championship	Boulogne-sur-Mer	Clay	(England) Edith Longhurst	w.o.
Win	14.	1902	Essex Championships	Colchester	Grass	(United Kingdom) Dorothea Douglass	1-6, 6–3, 6-4
Win	15.	1903	Austrian Championships	Prague	Clay	(Austria-Hungary) Frida Pietrzikowski	6-0, 6-0
Win	16.	1903	Shropshire Championships	Shrewsbury	Grass	(United Kingdom) Eva Steedman	w.o.
Win	17.	1903	Cinque Ports Championships (2)	Folkestone	Grass	(United Kingdom) E. Rapson	6-1, 6-4
Win	18.	1903	Berkshire Championships	Reading	Grass	(United Kingdom) Alice Greene	7-5, 6-3
Win	19.	1904	Scottish Championships	Moffat	Grass	(Scotland) Alice Ferguson	7-5, 7-5
Win	20.	1904	Highland Championships	Pitlochry	Grass	(Scotland) Alice Ferguson	6-3, 6-2
Win	21.	1904	Cinque Ports Championships (3)	Folkestone	Grass	(United Kingdom) "Miss Britain"	6-4, 3–6, 10-8
Win	22.	1904	Irish Championships	Dublin	Grass	(United Kingdom) Ellen Stawell-Brown	6–3, 6–3
Win	23.	1905	Sussex Championships	Brighton	Grass	(United Kingdom) Connie Wilson	divided prizes
Win	24.	1905	Irish Championships (2)	Dublin	Grass	(United Kingdom) Mrs. A.H.C. Barker	6–1, 6–0
Win	25.	1906	Ashby-de-la-Zouch Open Championships	Ashby-de-la-Zouch	Grass	(United Kingdom) Elsie Lane	6-3, 6-4
Win	26.	1906	Irish Championships (3)	Dublin	Grass	(United Kingdom) Mabel Parton	6–1, 6–1
Win	27.	1909	Leicestershire Championships	Ashby-de-la-Zouch	Grass	(United Kingdom) Kathleen Clements	6-2, 6-2
Win	28.	1911	Exmouth Open Tennis Tournament	Exmouth	Grass	(United Kingdom) Phyllis Carr	6–3, 6–3
Win	29.	1914	Ilkley Open Lawn Tennis Tournament	Ilkley	Grass	(United Kingdom) Phyllis Dransfield	6-4, 7-5

== Family ==
Winfred never married, her younger sister was Edith Longhurst who was also a tennis player.
