= John Pennycuick (judge) =

English barrister and judge

Sir John Pennycuick

Vice-Chancellor
- In office 1970–1974

Justice of the High Court
- In office 1960–1970

Personal details
- Born: John Pennycuick; 6 November 1899 Glasgow, Lanarkshire, Scotland
- Died: 14 January 1982 (aged 82) London, England
- Education: Winchester College; New College, Oxford
- Occupation: Judge
- Profession: Law

Sir John Pennycuick (6 November 1899 – 14 January 1982) was an English barrister and judge. He was a High Court judge from 1960 to 1974, and Vice-Chancellor of the Chancery Division from the recreation of the office in 1970 until 1974.

He was also an amateur tennis player who competed at the Wimbledon Championships between 1925 and 1931.

== Early life and legal career ==
Pennycuick was the only son of the British Army officer and engineer Colonel John Pennycuick, (1841–1911). His father was the tenth of the eleven children of Brigadier John Pennycuick (1789–1849), who was killed in the Battle of Chillianwala in the Second Anglo-Sikh War.

He was educated at Winchester College and New College, Oxford. He also attended the Royal Military Academy Sandhurst, and became a second lieutenant in the Coldstream Guards in 1919.

He was called to the bar at Inner Temple in 1925, where later he became a bencher in 1954. He became a Queen's Counsel in 1947.

== Legal career ==
He was appointed as a High Court judge in 1960, in the Chancery Division, and received the customary knighthood. Pennycuick became the first modern Vice-Chancellor in July 1970 when the office was revived to replace the title of "Senior Judge" for the head of the Chancery Division. He was appointed as a Privy Counsellor in the Queen's Birthday Honours List in June 1974, and retired as a full-time Chancery judge in September 1974, although he continued to occasionally sit as a judge. He was appointed Treasurer of the Inner Temple from 1978 to 1979.

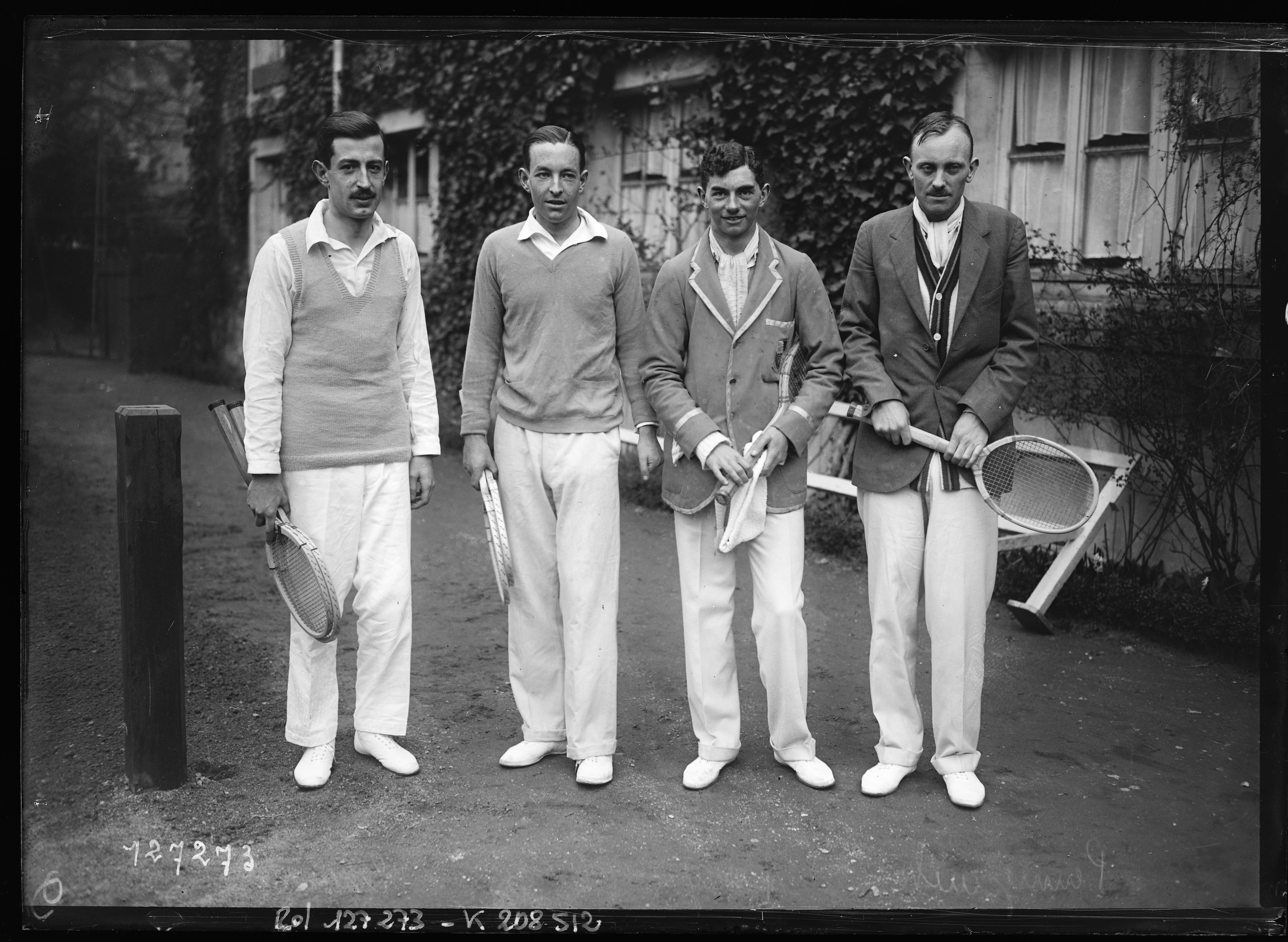
Tennis Club de Paris 1928. Pennycuick on right

== Tennis career ==
Once Sir John began started to work in the law courts, he took up tennis and became a notable amateur player who went onto win 12 career singles titles between 1925 and 1938. In major tournaments between 1925 and 1931, he competed at the Wimbledon Championships six times in the men's singles events. He advanced to the third round in 1925 where he lost to the Indian player Jagat Mohan Lal, and 1926 where he was beaten by Czech international Jan Koželuh.

His career singles highlights included winning the Cinque Ports Championships three times in 1926, 1927 and 1929, the Hampshire Championships in 1927, the South Herefordshire Championships in 1931 and 1934, the Birchington Open in 1933 and 1936, the Wiltshire Championships in 1934 and 1935, and the Kent Coast Championships in 1937 and 1938.

== Family ==
He married Lucy Johnstone in 1930, and they had one son and one daughter. His wife predeceased him in 1972.

== Sources ==
- Obituary in The Times, 15 January 1982, p. 10.

Legal offices
Preceded by New office	Vice-Chancellor; 1971–1974	Succeeded by Sir Anthony Plowman
