= Constance Luard =

English tennis player

- Full name: Constance Mary Luard
- Country (sports): United Kingdom
- Born: 2 September 1881 Oatlands, Surrey, England
- Died: 17 December 1955 (aged 74) Eastbourne, Devon, England
- Turned pro: 1889 (amateur)
- Retired: 1913

Singles
- Career titles: 24

Grand Slam singles results
- Wimbledon: F^{(AC)} (1905, 1907)

Grand Slam doubles results
- Wimbledon: 2R (1913)

Grand Slam mixed doubles results
- Wimbledon: 3R (1913)

Constance Mary Luard (née Wilson; 2 September 1881 – 17 December 1955) also known as Connie Wilson was an English tennis player. She was a two time All-Comers finalist at the Wimbledon Championships in 1905 and 1907. She was active from 1889 to 1913 and won 24 career singles titles.

== Tennis career ==
Connie Wilson as she was known played and won her first tournament at the Mid-Kent Championships in Maidstone, Kent against Alice Greene in 1901. Later that year she won the East of England Championships held in Felixstowe defeating Hilda Lane in the final. In 1902 she took part in two tournaments that season, she was a losing finalist at the Welsh Championships and at Saxmundham she won the Suffolk Championships against Agnes Morton.

During the 1903 lawn tennis season she won five singles titles including the Welsh Championships in Penarth against Winifred Longhurst. At the Kent Championships in Beckenham she defeated Dorothea Douglass in three sets to take the title. She finished the season by winning the South of England Championships title at Eastbourne defeating Dorothea Douglass in straight sets for the second time. She also took the Suffolk title for the second time against Edith Austin Greville. At the Bournemouth Open Tournament she won that event against Ellen Mary Stawell-Brown.

In 1904 Wilson won five singles events that year, in Penarth she retained her Welsh Championships title, beating Maude Garfit in the final. She then played at the Midland Counties Championships held at Edgbaston and won the title against Blanche Bingley Hillyard. At the Kent Coast Championships in Hythe she won the title against Winifred Longhurst. She picked up a third consecutive Suffolk Championships title beating Alice Greene the final. She collected a second consecutive Bournemouth Open against a 'Miss Britain' a (pseudonym).

1905 was a big year for Wilson where she won eight singles titles during this season. She played at the Derbyshire Championships in Buxton, where she defeated in the final, at the Northumberland Championships she beat. She won the Surrey Grass Court Championships at Surbiton against Winifred Longhurst. She travelled to France to play at the South of France Championships in Nice, where she won her only clay court title against the German player Clara von der Schulenburg. She won the Kent Championships for the second time against Alice Greene. She picked up a second Midland Counties title downing Dorothea Douglass in straight sets. On the French Riviera circuit that year she lost in the final of the Monte Carlo Championships.

At the 1905 Wimbledon Championships she advanced to the All Comers final where she pushed the great American player May Sutton and reigning U.S. National Champion in two tightly fought sets. She finished the season by taking the Kent Coast title for the second time against Winfred Longhurst in three close sets, and she divided the prizes and Sussex Championships title with Winifred Longhurst.

In 1906 she won her third Midland Counties Championships title against Alice Greene. In Hythe she collected her third Kent Coast title beating Mildred Coles in two sets. In 1907 she competed at Wimbledon Championships where she reach the All Comers final for the second time but was beaten by US international May Sutton in straight sets. She played her final singles tournament at the East East Surrey Championships held in Croydon, where she won that title in three sets against Gladys Eastlake-Smith.

== Other sports ==
As Constance Mary Wilson she played hockey for the England national team. She also competed at the All England Table Tennis Championships held at the Royal Aquarium, London in 1902.

== Family ==
Constance Mary Wilson was born on 2 September 1881, in Oatlands, Surrey, England. She was the daughter of John Walter Wilson, a wine merchant (b. 1837 in Wirksworth, Derbyshire) and Ellen Marie Wilson (née Baker; b. 1844 in Hanley, Staffordshire).

On 21 July 1907 at Hove, Sussex, she married John Frank Luard, son of Major-General Frederick Peter Luard and Lydia Maria Louisa Palmer. Her husband was a nephew of Richard Luard and cousin of Charles Luard.
