= Ashby-de-la-Zouch Open Championships =

Defunct tennis tournament
- Tour: ILTF Circuit
- Founded: 1900; 125 years ago
- Abolished: 1939; 86 years ago
- Location: Ashby-de-la-Zouch, Leicestershire, England
- Venue: Ashby Castle Lawn Tennis Club
- Surface: Grass

The Ashby-de-la-Zouch Open Championships, informally called the Ashby-de-la-Zouch Open, was a men's and women's grass court tennis tournament first established in 1900. The championship was first held on courts at the Bath Grounds in Ashby-de-la-Zouch, Leicestershire, England. The tournament ran until 1926 when it was suddenly discontinued. It was revived in 1930 and continued till 1939 when it was finally abolished.

== History ==
In 1900 Ashby-de-la-Zouch Open Championship was formally established. The tournament was originally organised by the Ashby-de-la-Zouch Lawn Tennis Association and Club and was played at the Bath Grounds in Ashby-de-la-Zouch, Leicestershire, England.

In 1926 the Ashby-de-la-Zouch Lawn Tennis Association Club changed its name to the Ashby Castle Lawn Tennis Club. It was formally incorporated on land it had purchased at Ashby Park, which was part of Ashby de la Zouch Castle (owned by the Hastings family). After which the tournament moved there. The new venue consisted of three grass courts and two red shale clay courts, and a wooden pavilion, with veranda plus a separate changing hut.

In 1900, 1901, 1904 and 1909 this tournament was also valid as the Leicestershire Championships with players being awarded both titles. e.g. Ashby-de-la-Zouch Open Champion and Leicestershire Champion. On 18 November 1926 it was announced by the Leicestershire Lawn Tennis Association (f.1900), today called Tennis Leicestershire, that the tournament was to be dropped from its official schedule of events, citing financial constraints. In 1930, the championships were revived and continued to be held until 1939, when it was fully discontinued due to World War II.

== Finals ==
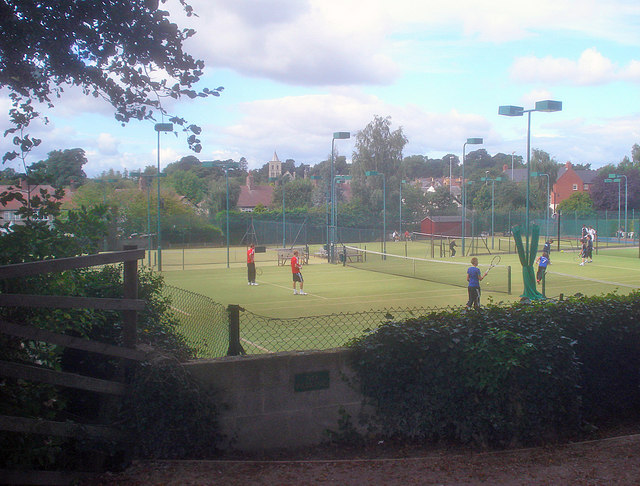
Ashby Castle Lawn Tennis Club (2009) was the venue of this event.

=== Men's singles ===
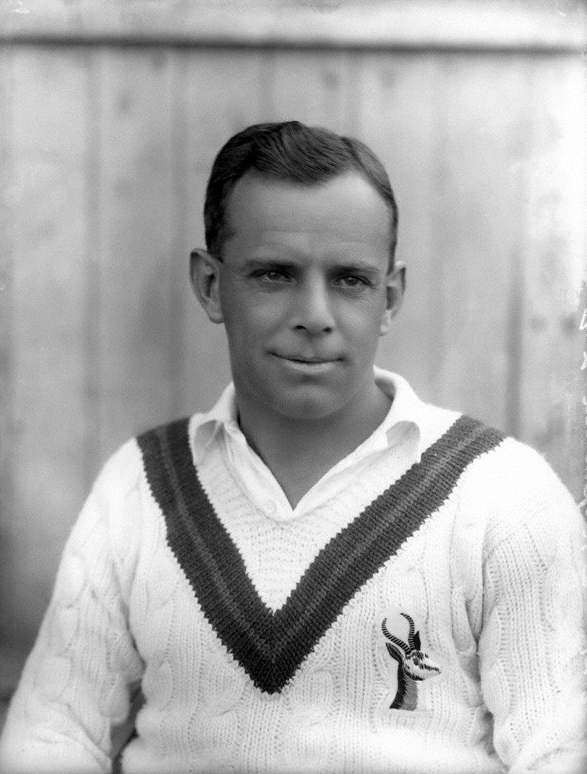
Louis Raymond from South Africa won the men's singles in 1920.

(incomplete roll)

Year	Champions	Runners-up	Score
1900	(United Kingdom of Great Britain and Ireland) Edward Roy Allen	(United Kingdom of Great Britain and Ireland) Frederick William Payn	6–2, 6–2.
1901	(United Kingdom of Great Britain and Ireland) Edward Roy Allen (2)	(United Kingdom of Great Britain and Ireland) C.M. Bartlett	6–0, 6–2.
1904	(United Kingdom of Great Britain and Ireland) A.P. Ford	(United Kingdom of Great Britain and Ireland) L. West	6–0, 6–2, 9–7.
1909	(United Kingdom of Great Britain and Ireland) Edward Roy Allen (3)	(United Kingdom of Great Britain and Ireland) Harry Alabaster Parker	6–4, 6–4, 6–4.
1920	(South Africa) Louis Raymond	(United Kingdom of Great Britain and Ireland) Cecil J. Tindell-Green	6–0, 6–4.
1921	(United Kingdom of Great Britain and Ireland) George S. Fletcher	(United Kingdom of Great Britain and Ireland) H.J. Weston	6–1, 6–3, 6-1.

=== Women's singles ===
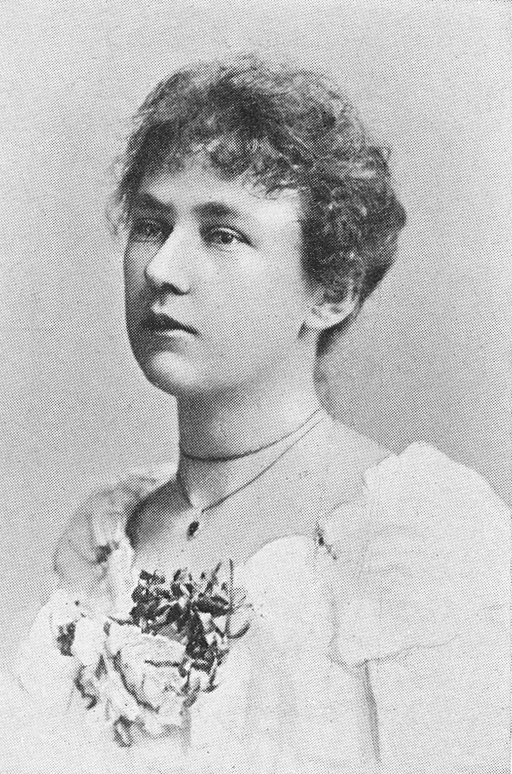
Maude Garfit won 2 singles titles.

(incomplete roll)

Year	Champions	Runners-up	Score
1900	(United Kingdom of Great Britain and Ireland) Helen Cressy Green	(United Kingdom of Great Britain and Ireland) Ida Cressy	walkover
1901	(United Kingdom of Great Britain and Ireland) Helen Cressy Green (2)	(United Kingdom of Great Britain and Ireland) Ida Cressy	walkover
1902	(United Kingdom of Great Britain and Ireland) Maude Garfit	(United Kingdom of Great Britain and Ireland) Miss Cressy	6–2, 6–3
1904	(United Kingdom of Great Britain and Ireland) Maude Garfit (2)	(United Kingdom of Great Britain and Ireland) Elizabeth Lunt Heatley	6–7, retd.
1906	(United Kingdom of Great Britain and Ireland) Winifred Longhurst	(United Kingdom of Great Britain and Ireland) Elsie Lane	6–3, 6–4
1908	(United Kingdom of Great Britain and Ireland) Elizabeth Lunt Heatley	(United Kingdom of Great Britain and Ireland) C. Jones	divided prizes
1909	(United Kingdom of Great Britain and Ireland) Winifred Longhurst (2)	(United Kingdom of Great Britain and Ireland) Kathleen Clements	6–2, 6–2
1915–18	Not held due to World war I		
1920	(United Kingdom of Great Britain and Ireland) Doris Kate Craddock	(United Kingdom of Great Britain and Ireland) Mrs J.B. Perrett	8–6, 8–6
1921	(United Kingdom of Great Britain and Ireland) Mabel Davy Clayton	(United Kingdom of Great Britain and Ireland) Mabel Squire Parton	10–8, 6–2
1922	(United Kingdom) Mabel Davy Clayton (2)	(United Kingdom) M.A. Wright	6–2, 6–3
1923	(United States) Elizabeth Ryan	(United Kingdom) Mary Hart McIlquham	6–1, 6–3
1924	(United Kingdom) Mary Hart McIlquham	(United Kingdom) Marie Hazel	5–7, 6–3, 6–2
1926	(United Kingdom) Mrs P. Whitley	(United Kingdom) Mrs Munro	8–6, 7–5
