= Camilla Rimington =

English tennis player

- Full name: Annie Camilla Beatrice Rimington
- Country (sports): Great Britain
- Born: 17 January 1883 Kensington, London, England
- Died: 2 February 1953 (age 70) London, England
- Turned pro: 1907 (amateur tour)
- Retired: 1927

Singles
- Career titles: 9

Grand Slam singles results
- Wimbledon: 2R (1922)

Doubles

Grand Slam doubles results
- Wimbledon: 2R (1922, 1923)

Grand Slam mixed doubles results
- Wimbledon: 3R (1922)

Annie Camilla Beatrice Rimington (17 January 1883 – 2 February 1953) was an English tennis player known later by her married name Camilla Neville-Smith towards the end of her tennis career. She played at Wimbledon two times in 1922 and 1923. She was active from 1907 to 1927 and contested 15 career singles finals, and won 9 titles.

== Career ==
Camilla was born in Kensington, London, England on 17 January 1883. In 1907 she played her first tournament at the Cumberland Tournament played at the Eden Tennis Club at Stanwixm, she took part in the a women's doubles event partnered with Agnes Morton where they beat Mrs Beatrice Draffen and Maude Garfit in the fourth round, but then lost in the quarter finals.

She would go on to win the Cumberland Tournament six times (1919, 1921-23, 1925, 1927). She also won the North Wales Championships at Criccieth three times (1921–1923). In addition she was also a finalist at Hornsey (1921), Stratford-on-Avon (1922), Brockenhurst Open (1923), Wallingford-on-Thames (1923) and Conishead Priory (1926)

== Family ==
Her younger sister was Alice Margaret Emma Rimington (1884-1955) who was also a tennis player. She married Neville Hardcastle Smith in the first quarter of 1924 in Penrith, Cumbria.
