= Shropshire Championships =

Defunct tennis tournament
- Tour: ILTF Circuit
- Founded: 1903; 122 years ago
- Abolished: 1959; 66 years ago
- Location: Newport; Shrewsbury
- Venue: Severnside Lawn Tennis Club
- Surface: Grass

The Shropshire Championships or Shropshire Open Championship or Shropshire County Championships was a men's and women's grass court tennis tournament first established in 1903 as the Championship of Shropshire. It was first held at the Severnside Lawn Tennis Club (f. 1897) Shrewsbury, Shropshire, England. The tournament was staged annually until 1959.

== History ==
In 1897 the Severnside Lawn Tennis Club was formed. In 1903 the club established the first Championship of Shropshire. In 1905 the Shropshire Lawn Tennis Association was formed, it became responsible for organising and promoting the county championships.

The tournament was staged annually until 1914 when it was suspended because of World War I it resumed thereafter. The event was held in Shrewsbury for 32 years until 1939. It was suspended again between 1940 and 1945 due to World War II. Following the second world war the tournament was moved Newport, Shropshirefor the next 12 years until 1960 when it was discontinued as part of the ILTF Circuit.

The Shropshire County Championships (Closed) is still being held today only open to residents and players from Shropshire.

== Finals ==
=== Men's singles ===
(incomplete roll)

Year	Winners	Runners-up	Score
1904	(New Zealand) Anthony Wilding	(United Kingdom) E.V. Jones	4-6, 9–7, 8–6, ret.
1905	(United Kingdom) Edward Roy Allen	(United Kingdom) E.V. Jones	6-4, 6–4, 6-2
1906	(New Zealand) Anthony Wilding (2)	(United Kingdom) Edward Roy Allen	5-7, 6–0, 6–1, 3–6, 6-4
1907	(United Kingdom) Edward Roy Allen (2)	(United Kingdom) Ernest George Parton	6-2, 6–3, 6-0
1908	(United Kingdom) Edward Roy Allen (3)	(United States) Wylie Grant	6-3, 6–3, 6-3
1909	(United Kingdom) Theodore Mavrogordato	(United Kingdom) Edward Roy Allen	5-7, 6–1, 8–10, 6–1, 6-3
1910	(United Kingdom) Theodore Mavrogordato (2)	(United Kingdom) Frank H. Pearce	6-0, 6–3, 6-0
1920	(United Kingdom) George Stoddart	(United Kingdom) Gerald (Gerry) Millard	6-1, 6–2, 3–6, 6-1
1921	(United Kingdom) William D. Radcliffe	(United Kingdom) Samuel Ernest Charlton	6-1, 6-4
1915/1919	Not held (due to World War I)		
1931	(Japan) Ryuki Miki	(New Zealand) Cam Malfroy	5-7, 7–5, 6-2
1940/1945	Not held (due to World War II)		
1949	(South Africa) David Samaai	(Czechoslovakia) Milan Matous	6-4, 6-4
1953	(United Kingdom) Mike Davies	(United Kingdom) B. Smith	6-2, 6-1
1954	(United Kingdom) L.M. Kilby	(United Kingdom) D.J.W. Richards	7-5, 6-1
1955	(United Kingdom) Louis Surville	(United Kingdom) John Stewart	7-5, 6-2
1959	(United Kingdom) Edward (Ted) Beards	(United Kingdom) Trevor A. Adamson	6-0, 6-2

=== Women's singles ===
(incomplete roll)

Year	Winners	Runners-up	Score
1903	(United Kingdom) Winifred Longhurst	(United Kingdom) Eva Steedman	walkover
1904	(United Kingdom) Maude Garfit	(United Kingdom) C. Jones	6-4, 8-6
1905	(United Kingdom) Maude Garfit (2)	(United Kingdom) Violet Pinckney	7-5, 6-3
1906	(United Kingdom) Violet Pinckney	(United Kingdom) Maude Garfit	1-6, 6–4, 6-3
1907	(United Kingdom) Maude Garfit 3)	(United Kingdom) Edith Boucher	5-7, 6–4, 6-1
1908	(United Kingdom) Maude Garfit (4)	(United Kingdom) Mabel Squire Parton	4-6, 6–2, 6-0
1909	(United Kingdom) Maude Garfit (5)	(United Kingdom) Mabel Squire Parton	6-3, 6-4
1910	(United Kingdom) Maude Garfit (6)	(United Kingdom) Mabel Squire Parton	7-5, 3–6, 6-4
1911	(United Kingdom) Mabel Squire Parton	(United Kingdom) Winifred Longhurst	6-4, 6-4
1912	(United Kingdom) Marie Hazel	(United Kingdom) Mrs Rosendale-Lloyd	6-2, 7-5
1913	(United Kingdom) Marie Hazel (2)	(United Kingdom) Mrs Rosendale-Lloyd	6-2, 6-3
1914	(United Kingdom) Mrs Rosendale-Lloyd	(United Kingdom) Mrs E. Wilkinson	6-3, 1–6, 6-3
1915/1919	Not held (due to World War I)		
1920	(United Kingdom) Mrs Spoor	(United Kingdom) Marie Hazel	2-6, 6–0, 8-6
1921	(United Kingdom) Marie Hazel (3)	(United Kingdom) Mrs Rosendale-Lloyd	6-1, 6-3
1924	(United Kingdom) Joan Fry	(United Kingdom) F. Holden	6-1, 6-3
