= Midland Counties Championships =

Defunct tennis tournament
- Event name: Midland Counties Championships
- Tour: Pre open era
- Founded: 1882
- Abolished: 1977
- Editions: 72
- Location: Edgbaston; Birmingham; Great Britain
- Venue: Edgbaston Cricket and Lawn Tennis Club

The Midland Counties Championships also known as the Midland International was a grass court tennis tournament held at Edgbaston Cricket and Lawn Tennis Club, Edgbaston, Great Britain from 1882 to 1977.

== History ==
The first unofficial championship was established in 1881 at the Edgbaston Cricket and Lawn Tennis Club, Edgbaston near Birmingham, England as part of the Edgbaston Open Tournament. In 1882 the Midland Counties Challenge Cup became a separate event and ran for seventy two editions until 1977. The event featured both men's and women's singles, doubles and mixed doubles competitions and was classified as an open tournament.

The men' event was succeeded by the Birmingham Open in 1978 a $125k event as part of ITF Grand Prix Circuit that year, it was staged only once, it was later revived in 1991 as an indoor tournament for that season only.

The women's was succeeded five years later by a new event called the Edgbaston Cup a Toyota International Series event on the Toyota Series Circuit.

== Finals ==
Notes: Challenge round: The final round of a tournament, in which the winner of a single-elimination phase faces the previous year's champion, who plays only that one match. The challenge round was used in the early history of tennis (from 1877 through 1921) in some tournaments not all.

=== Men's singles ===
Included: (Incomplete roll) Notes: * This edition was part of the Edgbaston Open Tournament.

| Year | Champion | Runner-up | Score |
|---|---|---|---|
Midland Counties Challenge Cup
| 1881 * | (United Kingdom of Great Britain and Ireland) Walter Chamberlain | (United Kingdom of Great Britain and Ireland) F.S. Goodwin | 6-3, 6-4, 6-4 |
Midland Counties Championship
| 1882 | (United Kingdom of Great Britain and Ireland) R. W. Smith | (United Kingdom of Great Britain and Ireland) George Reston Brewerton | 2 sets to 1 |
| 1884 | (United Kingdom of Great Britain and Ireland) Walter Chamberlain (2) | (United Kingdom of Great Britain and Ireland) John Redfern Deykin | 6-3, 2-6, 10-8, 6-1 |
| 1885 | (United Kingdom of Great Britain and Ireland) Conway J Morgan | (United Kingdom of Great Britain and Ireland) Walter Chamberlain | 6-4, 2-6, 2-6, 6-2, 9-7 |
| 1886 | (United Kingdom of Great Britain and Ireland) Frank Noon | (United Kingdom of Great Britain and Ireland) Conway J Morgan | 6-4, 6-2, 6-4 |
| 1887 | (United Kingdom of Great Britain and Ireland) John Redfern Deykin | (United Kingdom of Great Britain and Ireland) Frank Noon | 6-4, 6-4, 6-2 |
| 1888 | (United Kingdom of Great Britain and Ireland) Harry Scrivener | (United Kingdom of Great Britain and Ireland) John Redfern Deykin | 6-2, 6-0, 9-7 |
| 1889 | (United Kingdom of Great Britain and Ireland) John Redfern Deykin (2) | (United Kingdom of Great Britain and Ireland) Harold Weston Carlton | 2-6, 6-1, 3-6, 6-3, 6-4 |
| 1890 | (United Kingdom of Great Britain and Ireland) John Redfern Deykin (3) | (United Kingdom of Great Britain and Ireland) Henry Guy Nadin | 0-6, 6-2, 6-4, 6-3 |
| 1891 | (United Kingdom of Great Britain and Ireland) James Baldwin | (United Kingdom of Great Britain and Ireland) Harry S, Barlow | 6-3, 7-9, 3-6, 6-2, 6-1 |
| 1892 | (United Kingdom of Great Britain and Ireland) Harry S, Barlow | (United Kingdom of Great Britain and Ireland) Tom Chaytor | 6-4, 6-1 |
| 1893 | (United Kingdom of Great Britain and Ireland) George Hillyard | (United Kingdom of Great Britain and Ireland) Henry Guy Nadin | 6-3, 6-1, 6-3 |
| 1894 | (United Kingdom of Great Britain and Ireland) George Hillyard (2) | (United Kingdom of Great Britain and Ireland) R A Bennett | 6-4, 6-2, 6-1 |
| 1895 | (United Kingdom of Great Britain and Ireland) George Hillyard (3) | (United Kingdom of Great Britain and Ireland) Sydney Howard Smith | 6-4, 8-6, 4-6, 6-1 |
| 1896 | (United Kingdom of Great Britain and Ireland) Sydney Howard Smith | (United Kingdom of Great Britain and Ireland) Charles Henry Ridding | 6-3, 8-6 |
| 1897 | (United Kingdom of Great Britain and Ireland) Sydney Howard Smith (2) | (United Kingdom of Great Britain and Ireland) George Hillyard | 6-2, 6-3, 8-6 |
| 1898 | (United Kingdom of Great Britain and Ireland) Sydney Howard Smith (3) | (United Kingdom of Great Britain and Ireland) George Hillyard | 4-6, 9-7, 6-4, 1-6, 6-2 |
| 1899 | (United Kingdom of Great Britain and Ireland) Wilberforce Eaves | (United Kingdom of Great Britain and Ireland) Ernest D Black | 8-6, 6-2 |
| 1900 | (United Kingdom of Great Britain and Ireland) Sydney Howard Smith (4) | (United Kingdom of Great Britain and Ireland) George Hillyard | 6-2, 6-3, 7-5 |
| 1901 | (United Kingdom of Great Britain and Ireland) Sydney Howard Smith (5) | (United Kingdom of Great Britain and Ireland) Wilberforce Eaves | 6-3, 6-1 |
| 1902 | (United Kingdom of Great Britain and Ireland) Sydney Howard Smith (6) | (United Kingdom of Great Britain and Ireland) Frank Riseley | 6-4, 6-3, 6-4 |
| 1903 | (United Kingdom of Great Britain and Ireland) Sydney Howard Smith (7) | (United Kingdom of Great Britain and Ireland) Josiah Ritchie | 5-7, 7-5, 7-5, 6-2 |
| 1904 | (United Kingdom of Great Britain and Ireland) Sydney Howard Smith (8) | (United Kingdom of Great Britain and Ireland) Wilberforce Eaves | 6-4, 6-3, 6-2 |
| 1905 | (United Kingdom of Great Britain and Ireland) Sydney Howard Smith (9) | (Australia) Norman Brookes | 15-13, 6-4, 4-6, 6-4 |
| 1906 | (United Kingdom of Great Britain and Ireland) John Mycroft Boucher | (United Kingdom of Great Britain and Ireland) Wilberforce Eaves | 6-4, 3-6, 6-4, 6-3 |
| 1907 | (United Kingdom of Great Britain and Ireland) John Mycroft Boucher (2) | (Republic of Ireland) James Cecil Parke | 6-2, 8-10, 6-3, 9-7 |
| 1908 | (United Kingdom of Great Britain and Ireland) John Mycroft Boucher (3) | (Republic of Ireland) James Cecil Parke | 6-2, 6-3, 6-2 |
| 1909 | (Australia) Stanley Doust | (Republic of Ireland) James Cecil Parke | 6-2, 6-0 |
| 1910 | (Republic of Ireland) James Cecil Parke | (Australia) Stanley Doust | 9-7, 6-3, 6-2 |
| 1911 | (United Kingdom of Great Britain and Ireland) Arthur Lowe | (Republic of Ireland) James Cecil Parke | 2-6, 6-3, 6-2 |
| 1912 | (Australia) Stanley Doust (2) | (South Africa) Charles L Wilmslow | 6-4, 6-0, 6-1 |
| 1913 | (Australia) Stanley Doust (3) | (Denmark) Erik Larsen | 6-1, 6-3 |
| 1914 | (United Kingdom of Great Britain and Ireland) Alfred Beamish | (United Kingdom of Great Britain and Ireland) William L Clements | 6-1, 9-7, 2-6, 6-0 |
| 1915/1918 | men's event not held due to World War I | | |
| 1919 | (Australia) Stanley Doust | (Australia) Pat O'Hara Wood | 6-4, 6-4 |
| 1920 | (United States) Bill Tilden | (United Kingdom of Great Britain and Ireland) Chales L Wilmslow | 6-4, 6-2, 3-6, 6-4 |
| 1921 | (South Africa) Brian Norton | (United Kingdom of Great Britain and Ireland) Frank Lorymer Riseley | 8-6, 6-0, 6-0 |
| 1922 | (United Kingdom) Gordon Francis Lowe | (United Kingdom of Great Britain and Ireland) N M Greeg | 6-2 6-2 6-2 |
| 1923 | (British Raj) Hassan Ali Fyzee | (United Kingdom of Great Britain and Ireland) Donald Greig | 6-2 6-4 |
| 1924 | (United Kingdom) Jack M Hillyard | (United Kingdom) Gordon Crole-Rees | 6-4, 7-5, 6-4 |
| 1925 | (United Kingdom) John Brian Gilbert | (Switzerland) Hector Fisher | 4-6, 7-5, 6-3, 5-7, 6-3 |
| 1926 | (Switzerland) Hector Fisher | (United Kingdom) Jack M Hillyard | 6-1, 9-7, 5-7, 6-1 |
| 1927 | (United Kingdom) Bunny Austin | (United Kingdom) Keats Lester | 6-1, 6-3 |
| 1928 | (British Raj) Mohammed Sleem | (United Kingdom) Keats Lester | 4-6, 6-1, 6-0, 6-0 |
| 1929 | (United Kingdom) William Henry Powell | (United Kingdom) Jack Lysaght | 6-1, 6-2 |
| 1930 | (United Kingdom) Keats Lester | (Japan) Ryuki Miki | 6-3, 6-3 |
| 1931 | (Japan) Jiro Satoh | (United Kingdom) Herman David | 7-5, 6-4 |
| 1932 | (United Kingdom) John Olliff | (France) Antoine Gentien | 1-6, 6-4, 2-0, retired. |
| 1933 | (Japan) Ryuki Miki | (United Kingdom) Keats Lester | 6-4, 6-2 |
| 1934 | (United Kingdom) Keats Lester (2) | (France) Antoine Gentien | 4-6, 6-3, 6-3 |
| 1935 | (Australia) Vivian McGrath | (South Africa) Walter Musgrove | 8-6, 6-2 |
| 1936 | (New Zealand) Cam Malfroy | (New Zealand) Alan Stedman | WEA |
| 1937 | (Republic of China (1912–1949)) Kho Sin-Kie | (United Kingdom) Herman David | 6-4, 6-3 |
| 1938 | (Socialist Federal Republic of Yugoslavia) Franjo Punčec | (Republic of China (1912–1949)) Kho Sin-Kie | 6-3, 2-6, 7-5 |
| 1939 | (United Kingdom) Donald Butler | (United Kingdom) Herman David | 3-3, unfinished |
| 1940/1945 | men's event not held due to World War II | | |
| 1946 | (Republic of China (1912–1949)) Kho Sin-Kie | (Argentina) Enrique Morea | 6-2, 1-6, 6-3 |
| 1947 | (Romania) Constantin Tănăsescu | (Australia) Jack Crawford | 6-1, 8-6, 3-6, 1-6, 6-3 |
| 1948 | (Philippines) Felicisimo Ampon | (Philippines) Raymundo Deyro | 6-2, 6-3 |
| 1949 | (United Kingdom) Tony Mottram | (Chile) Ricardo Balbiers | 6-3, 9-7 |
| 1950 | (Egypt) Jaroslav Drobný | (Hong Kong) Koon-Hong Ip | 6-2, 6-2 |
| 1951 | (Australia) Don Candy | (India) Naresh Kumar | 6-4, 6-2 |
| 1952 | (South Africa) Owen Gordon Williams | (South Africa) Trevor Fancutt | 6-4, 6-2 |
| 1953 | (South Africa) Russell Seymour | (United Kingdom) Tony Mottram | 8-6, 7-5 |
| 1954 | (Egypt) Jaroslav Drobný (2) | (United Kingdom) Roger Becker | 6-0, 6-3 |
| 1955 | (Egypt) Jaroslav Drobný (3) | (United States) Arthur Larsen | 7-5, 4-6, 6-4 |
| 1956 | (South Africa) Trevor Fancutt | (United Kingdom) Mike Davies | 7-5, 6-3, 6-4 |
| 1957 | (United States) Budge Patty | (Chile) Luis Ayala | 7-5, 3-6, 6-1 |
| 1959 | (United Kingdom) K F Buswell | (United Kingdom) Robert M Powell | 7-5, 8-6 |
| 1960 | (United Kingdom) Bobby Wilson | (Brazil) Ivo Ribeiro | 6-0, 6-2 |
| 1962 | (United Kingdom) Roger Becker | (New Zealand) Ian Crookenden | 6-3, 3-6, 6-3 |
| 1963 | (Australia) Roy Emerson | (Mexico) Rafael Osuna | 4-6, 6-3, 7-5 |
| 1964 | (Australia) Fred Stolle | (United Kingdom) Billy Knight | 3-6, 6-3, 6-2 |
| 1965 | (United Kingdom) Billy Knight | (United Kingdom) Bobby Wilson | 7-5, 6-3 |
| 1966 | (United Kingdom) Roy W. Dixon | (United Kingdom) Keith Bland | 6-2, 6-3 |
| 1967 | (United Kingdom) Roy W. Dixon (2) | (United Kingdom) Keith Bland | 6-4, 4-6, 7-5 |
| 1968 | (United Kingdom) Roy W. Dixon (3) | (United Kingdom) Peter Breed | 3-6, 6-3, 6-2 |
↓ Open era ↓
Bio-Strath Edgbaston
| 1970 | (Rhodesia) Andrew Pattison | (Australia) Peter Doerner | 6-4, 6-4 |
Midland Counties Championship
| 1973 | (United Kingdom) Roy W. Dixon (4) | (United Kingdom) Martin Ladbrooke | 7-6, 6-2 |
| 1974 | (United Kingdom) Peter R. Breed | (United Kingdom) Alan G. Purnell | 7-6, 6-4 |
| 1975 | (Australia) Hugh Thomson | (Ecuador) Ricardo Ycaza | 7-6, 6-3 |
| 1976 | (United States) Peter Pierson | (India) Nimish Desai | 6-2, 6-4 |
| 1977 | (Japan) Sachio Kato | (United Kingdom) Mike Newberry | 6-0, 6-4 |

=== Women's singles ===
(Incomplete roll)

| Year | Champion | Runner-up | Score |
|---|---|---|---|
Midland Counties Championships
| 1881 | (England) Maud Watson | (England) Lilian Watson | ? |
| 1882 | (England) Constance Langley Smith | (England) Miss Heaton | 6-2, 6-1 |
| 1883 | (England) Miss Hutton | (England) L. Sanders | 6-5 ,8-6 |
| 1884 | (England) Edith Noon | (England) Miss Richardson | 6-3, 8-6, 6-3 |
| 1885 | (United Kingdom) Margaret Bracewell | (United Kingdom) Mary Steedman | 6-3, 6-2 |
| 1886 | (United Kingdom) Blanche Bingley | (England) Lilian Watson | 6-0, 6-2 |
| 1887 | (United Kingdom) Margaret Bracewell (2) | (England) Florence Mardall | 6-0, 4-6, 7-5 |
| 1888 | (United Kingdom) Margaret Bracewell (3) | (England) Florence Mardall | 7-5, 6-1 |
| 1889 | event not held | | |
| 1890 | (United Kingdom) L. Johnstone | (United Kingdom) Ethel Taylor Valentin | 6-2, 5-6, 6-4 |
| 1891 | (United Kingdom) Alice Simpson Pickering | (United Kingdom) Mrs Wills | 6-1, 6-3 |
| 1892 | (United Kingdom) Edith Longhurst | (United Kingdom) Winifred Longhurst | divided prizes |
| 1893 | (United Kingdom) D. Morgan | (United Kingdom) Blanche Bingley Hillyard | 12-10, retd. |
| 1894 | women's event handicap only | | |
| 1895 | (United Kingdom) Winifred Longhurst | (United Kingdom) C. Jones | 4-6, 6-4, 7-5 |
| 1896 | (United Kingdom) Bertha Steedman | (United Kingdom) Katherine Grey | 6-4, 6-2 |
| 1897 | (United Kingdom) Ruth Dyas | (United Kingdom) Alice Simpson Pickering | 8-6, 3-6, 6-3 |
| 1898 | (United Kingdom) Blanche Bingley Hillyard | (United Kingdom) Maude Garfit | 6-3, 6-1 |
| 1899 | (United Kingdom) Charlotte Cooper | (United Kingdom) Ruth Dyas Durlacher | 3-6, 6-4, 8-6 |
| 1900 | (United Kingdom) Muriel Robb | (United Kingdom) Constance Hill | 6-3, 2-6, 6-3 |
| 1901 | (United Kingdom) Ruth Dyas Durlacher (2) | (United Kingdom) Maude Garfit | 6-4, 6-4 |
| 1902 | (United Kingdom) Winifred Longhurst (2) | (United Kingdom) Muriel Robb | 7-5, 7-5 |
| 1903 | (United Kingdom) Ethel Thomson | (United Kingdom) Gertrude Provis Houselander | 6-4, 6-2 |
| 1904 | (United Kingdom) Connie Wilson | (United Kingdom) Blanche Bingley Hillyard | 6-3, 6-3 |
| 1905 | (United Kingdom) Connie Wilson (2) | (United Kingdom) Dorothea Douglass | 7-5, 6-4 |
| 1906 | (United Kingdom) Connie Wilson (3) | (United Kingdom) Alice Greene | 6-1, 3-6, 6-4 |
| 1907 | (United Kingdom) Charlotte Cooper Sterry | (United Kingdom) Alice Greene | 6-3 ,9-7 |
| 1908 | (United Kingdom) Charlotte Cooper Sterry (2) | (United Kingdom) Edith Boucher | 6-3, 6-0 |
| 1909 | (United Kingdom) Helen Aitchison | (United Kingdom) Agnes Tuckey | 6-2, 4-6, 6-3 |
| 1910 | (United Kingdom) Dora Boothby | (United Kingdom) Helen Aitchison | 7-5, 7-5 |
| 1911 | (United Kingdom) Edith Hannam | (United Kingdom) Dora Boothby | 6-4, 2-6, 7-5 |
| 1912 | (United Kingdom) Edith Hannam (2) | (United Kingdom) Ethel Thomson Larcombe | 2-6, 6-4, 7-5 |
| 1913 | (United Kingdom) Edith Hannam (3) | (United States) Elizabeth Ryan | 6-4, 6-0 |
| 1914 | (United Kingdom) Winifred McNair | (United Kingdom) Helen Aitchison | 4-6, 6-3, 9-7 |
| 1915/1918 | women's event not held due to World War I | | |
| 1919 | (United Kingdom) Ethel Thomson Larcombe | (United Kingdom) Winifred McNair | 4-6, 6-2, 7-5 |
| 1920 | (United Kingdom) Dorothy Shepherd | (United Kingdom) Lesley Cadle | 8-6, 7-5 |
| 1921 | (United Kingdom) Geraldine Beamish | (United Kingdom) Dorothy Shepherd | 8-6, 6-2 |
| 1922 | (United Kingdom) Geraldine Beamish (2) | (United Kingdom) M. Fergus | 6-1, 6-1 |
| 1923 | (United Kingdom) Jessie Russell Colegate | (United Kingdom) Dorothy Shepherd Barron | 10-8, 2-6, 6-4 |
| 1924 | (United States) Elizabeth Ryan | (United Kingdom) Phyllis Satterthwaite | 6-2, 6-4 |
| 1925 | (United Kingdom) Phyllis Satterthwaite | (United Kingdom) Gwen Sterry | 6-1, 6-0 |
| 1926 | (United Kingdom) Ermyntrude Harvey | (United Kingdom) Joan Fry | 2-6, 6-4, 6-3 |
| 1927 | (United Kingdom) Jessie Russell Colegate (2) | (United Kingdom) Mary McIlquham | 6-2, 6-1 |
| 1928 | (United Kingdom) Naomi Trentham | (United Kingdom) Gwen Sterry | 3-6, 9-7, 9-7 |
| 1929 | (United Kingdom) Dorothy Round | (United Kingdom) Joan Fry | 6-1, 6-4 |
| 1930 | (United Kingdom) Naomi Trentham (2) | (United Kingdom) Mary McIlquham | 6-1, 1-6, 7-5 |
| 1931 | (Switzerland) Lolette Payot | (United Kingdom) Mary Heeley | 6-4, 4-6, 6-4 |
| 1932 | (Germany) Marie-Louise Horn | (United Kingdom) Freda James | 6-2, 6-3 |
| 1933 | (United Kingdom) Olga Webb | (Germany) Marie-Louise Horn | 6-4, 6-4 |
| 1934 | (Hungary) Countess Gabriela Szapary | (United Kingdom) E. Woodhall | 6-3, 4-6, 6-1 |
| 1935 | (Poland) Jadwiga Jędrzejowska | (Chile) Anita Lizana | 3-6, 6-3, 6-2 |
| 1936 | (Poland) Jadwiga Jędrzejowska (2) | (Germany) Irmgard Rost | 6-3 6-3 |
| 1937 | (United Kingdom) Mary Heeley | (Chile) Anita Lizana | 0-6, 6-4, 6-3 |
| 1938 | (United Kingdom) Mary Hardwick | (France) Simonne Mathieu | 7-5, 6-1 |
| 1939 | (United Kingdom) Freda James Hammersley | (France) Simonne Mathieu | divided prizes |
| 1940/1945 | women's event not held due to World War II | | |
| 1946 | (United Kingdom) Joan Curry | (Poland) Jadwiga Jędrzejowska | 7-5 6-3 |
| 1947 | (United Kingdom) Joan Curry (2) | (United Kingdom) Elsie Hamilton Phillips | 6-3, 6-0 |
| 1948 | (United Kingdom) Barbara Knapp | (United Kingdom) Dorothy Round Little | 7-5, 6-0 |
| 1949 | (Argentina) Mary Terán de Weiss | (United Kingdom) Joy Gannon | 9-7, 6-3 |
| 1950 | (United States) Nancy Chaffee | (United Kingdom) Rita Jarvis Anderson | 6-0, 6-2 |
| 1951 | (United States) Doris Hart | (United States) Shirley Fry | 4-6, 6-2, 7-5 |
| 1952 | (United States) Doris Hart (2) | (United States) Shirley Fry | 7-5, 3-6, 9-7 |
| 1953 | (Bermuda) Heather Nicholls Brewer | (United Kingdom) Billie Woodgate | 6-4, 6-1 |
| 1954 | (Bermuda) Heather Nicholls Brewer (2) | (United Kingdom) Joan Curry | 6-3, 3-6, 6-4 |
| 1955 | (South Africa) Hazel Redick-Smith | (Australia) Beryl Penrose | 11-9, 2-6, 11-9 |
| 1956 | (United Kingdom) Angela Mortimer | (Australia) Jenny Staley Hoad | 6-2, 4-6, 6-0 |
| 1957 | (United Kingdom) Angela Mortimer (2) | (Brazil) Maria Helena Amorim | 6-1, 6-1 |
| 1958 | women's event cancelled | | |
| 1959 | (United Kingdom) Hazel Cheadle | (United Kingdom) Miss Bishop | 6-4, 8-6 |
| 1960 | (United Kingdom) Angela Mortimer (3) | (Australia) Margaret Hellyer | 6-0, 6-1 |
| 1961 | (United Kingdom) Barbara Knapp | (Rhodesia) Jennifer Gail Morris | 6-0, 6-3 |
| 1962 | (United Kingdom) Rita Bentley | (United Kingdom) Ann Haydon | divided title |
| 1963 | (South Africa) Renée Schuurman | (United Kingdom) Ann Haydon Jones | 8-6, 6-4 |
| 1964 | (Australia) Jan Lehane | (United Kingdom) Ann Haydon Jones | 7-5, 6-1 |
| 1965 | (Australia) Margaret Smith | (United Kingdom) Virginia Wade | 6-3, 4-6, 7-5 |
| 1968 | (United Kingdom) Sue Tutt | (United Kingdom) Hazel Cheadle | 6-4, 6-3 |
↓ Open era ↓
| 1969 | (United Kingdom) Janice MacFarlane | (United Kingdom) Kate Tillin | 6-2, 6-4 |
Bio-Strath Edgbaston
| 1970 | (Australia) Sandra Walsham | (Argentina) Beatriz Araujo | 1-6, 7-5, 6-1 |
Midland Counties Championships
| 1973 | (United Kingdom) Hazel Cheadle | (United Kingdom) Mrs P. Reynolds | 3-6, 6-2, 7-5 |
| 1974 | (United Kingdom) C. Aitken | (United Kingdom) Hazel Cheadle | 7-6, 6-3 |
| 1975 | (United Kingdom) Ann Haydon Jones | (Netherlands) Inge Korsten | 6-0, 6-1 |
| 1976 | (Netherlands) Inge Korsten | (United Kingdom) Janice Wainwright | 4-6, 6-1, 6-3 |
| 1977 | (United Kingdom) Ann Haydon Jones (2) | (United Kingdom) Corinne Molesworth | 6-4, 6-4 |
For the successor women's event see Edgbaston Cup

== Sources ==
- "Abolition of Challenge Rounds". paperspast.natlib.govt.nz. EVENING POST, VOLUME CIII, ISSUE 65, 20 MARCH 1922.
- Cole, Matt. (2012) "At The Heart of the Game: The History of Edgbaston Priory Club" (PDF). edgbastonpriory.com. Edgbaston Priory Club.
- Myers, A. Wallis (1903). "Edgabston". Lawn Tennis at Home and Abroad. New York, USA: Scribner's sons.
- Nieuwland, Alex (2017). "Tournament – Midland Counties Championships". www.tennisarchives.com. Friesland, Netherlands: Tennis Archives.
