= Christ Church, Crowton =

Coordinates: 53.2664°N 2.6312°W

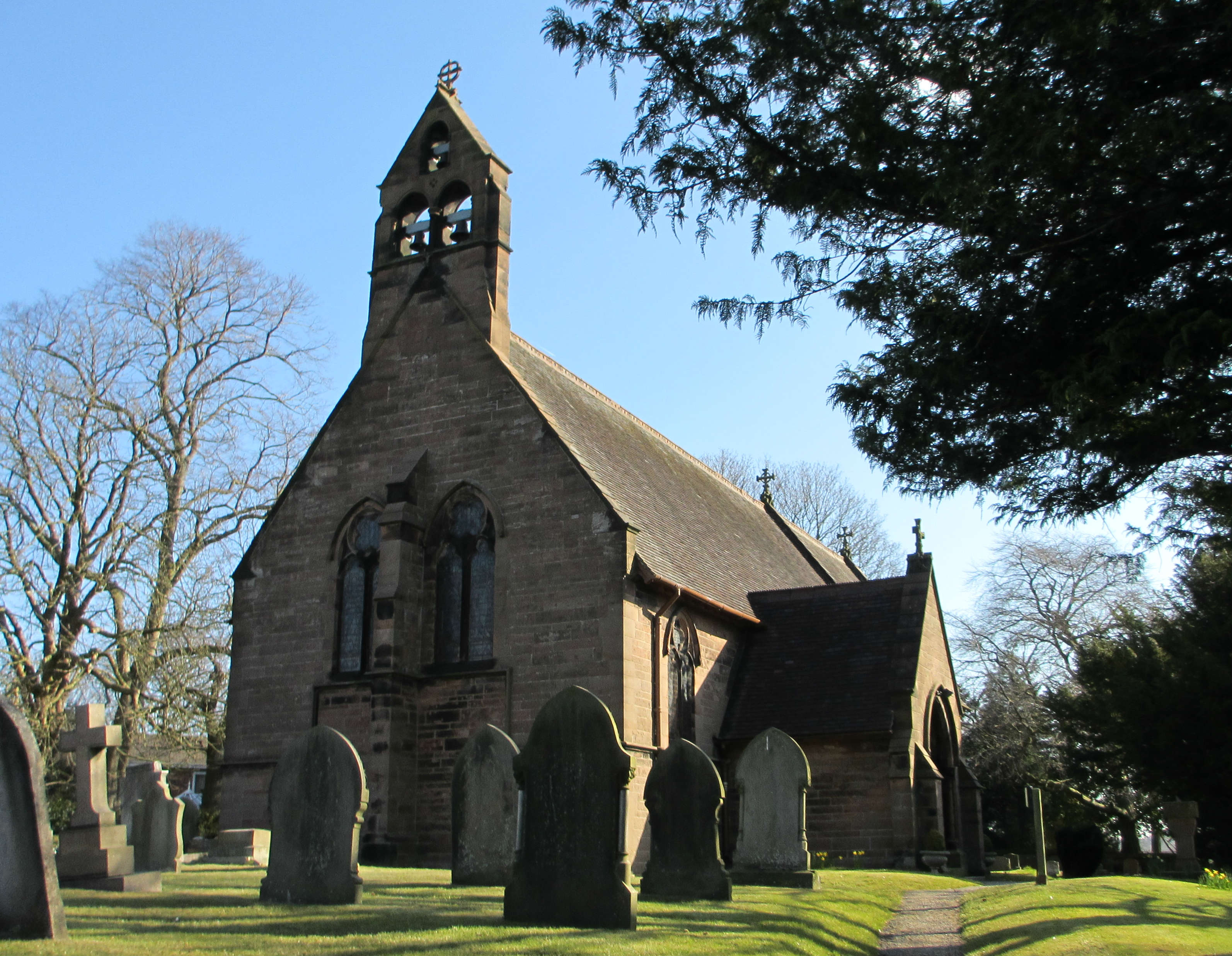
- Christ Church, Crowton, from the southwest

- Location in Cheshire
- OS grid reference: SJ 580 746
- Location: Station Road, Crowton, Cheshire
- Country: England
- Denomination: Anglican
- Website: Christ Church, Crowton

History
- Status: Parish church

Architecture
- Functional status: Active
- Heritage designation: Grade II
- Designated: 17 April 1986
- Architect: J. L. Pearson
- Architectural type: Church
- Style: Gothic Revival
- Completed: 1871

Specifications
- Materials: Sandstone, tiled roof

Administration
- Province: York
- Diocese: Chester
- Archdeaconry: Chester
- Deanery: Frodsham
- Parish: Christ Church, Crowton

Clergy
- Vicar: Revd Peter Rugen

Christ Church, Crowton, is in Station Road, Crowton, Cheshire, England. It is an active Anglican parish church in the deanery of Frodsham, the archdeaconry of Chester, and the diocese of Chester. Its benefice is combined with those of St John the Evangelist, Kingsley, and St John the Evangelist, Norley. The church is recorded in the National Heritage List for England as a designated Grade II listed building.

== History ==
Christ Church was built in 1871, the architect being J. L. Pearson.

== Architecture ==
The church is constructed in red sandstone, with a red tiled roof. Its architectural style is that of the 13th century. The plan consists of a four-bay nave and a two-bay chancel in one range, a transept and a vestry on the north side, a south porch, and a two-tier double bellcote at the west end. The buttresses include a massive stepped buttress on the south side at the division of the nave and the chancel. The windows in the nave have two lights, and those in the chancel have three lights. Inside the church, the nave is divided from the chancel by a low wall and a double chamfered arch. The organ was built in 1871 by Gray and Davidson.

== See also ==
- Listed buildings in Crowton
- List of new ecclesiastical buildings by J. L. Pearson
