= Welsh Championships =

Defunct tennis tournament
- Tour: Pre-open era (1877–1967)
- Founded: 1886
- Abolished: 1974
- Editions: 77
- Location: Cardiff, Newport, Penarth, Wales
- Venue: Penarth LTC (1886–89, 1893–95, 1901–09); Newport Athletic Club (1892, 1897–99, 1900, 1910–14, 1920–39, 1946–1974); Cardiff LTC (1891)
- Surface: Grass / Outdoor

The Welsh Championships (Welsh: Pencampwriaethau Cymru) its original name until 1970 was also known as the Championship of Wales (1951), the Welsh Open (Welsh: Cymraeg Agored) (1947–50) the Green Shield Welsh Championships and Green Shield Welsh Open (1970–74) for sponsorship reasons was an outdoor tennis event held from 1886 through 1974 it was played at various locations throughout its duration including Cardiff, Newport and Penarth in Wales. The dates that the tournament was held varied between June and July annually.

== History ==
The Welsh Championships tournament began in 1886. It was originally held at the Penarth Lawn Tennis club, in Penarth, Vale of Glamorgan through the later part of the nineteenth century and the first decade of the twentieth, the last event being held there in 1909. The championships was staged only once during this time in Cardiff, in 1891, before it became a permanent fixture at the Newport Athletic Club from 1946 onward which also the hosted the 1906 International Lawn Tennis Challenge final later known as the Davis Cup. The tournament featured both men's and women's singles competition as well as same sex and mixed doubles. The first non-British men's singles final took place in 1922 between Manuel Alonso and Eduardo Flaquer of Spain and this was followed by the first non-British ladies singles final in 1932 between Jadwiga Jędrzejowska of Poland and Marie-Louise Horn of Germany. Many former Grand Slam champions have played and won this tournament and it survived for a period of 88 years until 1974.

== Finals ==
=== Men's singles ===
Year	Champions	Runners-up	Score
1886	(Ireland) Ernest Browne	(United Kingdom) James Baldwin	6–0 ret.
1887	(Ireland) Ernest Browne (2)	(United Kingdom) James Baldwin	6–1, 6–2 ret.
1888	(Ireland) Willoughby Hamilton	(Ireland) Ernest Browne	6–1, 6–1, 6–0
1889	(Ireland) Willoughby Hamilton (2)	(United Kingdom) Ernest Lewis	3–6, 6–3, 6–4, 7–5
1890	(Ireland) Willoughby Hamilton (3	(United Kingdom) Charles Lacy Sweet	6–2, 6–3, 6–0
1891	(United Kingdom) Harry S. Barlow	(Ireland) Harold Mahony	5–7, 6–2, 7–5, 0–6, 6–1
1892	(United Kingdom) Harry S. Barlow (2)	(United Kingdom) Kenneth Ramsden Marley	6–4, 6–3, 6–2
1893	(Ireland) George Ball-Greene	(United Kingdom) Harry S. Barlow	2–6, 6–1, 7–5, 4–6, 6–4
1894	(Ireland) George Ball-Greene (2)	(United Kingdom) Edward Roy Allen	7–5, 6–1, 4–6, 6–2
1895	(United Kingdom) Wilberforce Eaves	(United Kingdom) Edward Roy Allen	2–6, 6–3, 6–3, 4–6, 6–3
1896	(United Kingdom) Sydney Howard Smith	(United Kingdom) Harry S. Barlow	6–1, 6–2, 2–6, 6–0
1897	(United Kingdom) Sydney Howard Smith (2)	(United Kingdom) John Mycroft Boucher	6–2, 6–4, 6–4
1898	(United Kingdom) Sydney Howard Smith (3)	(United Kingdom) Arnold Wyersdale Blake	6–0, 6–2, 6–3
1899	(United Kingdom) Sydney Howard Smith (4)	(United Kingdom) Wilberforce Eaves	6–4, 4–6, 6–2, 5–7, 6–4
1900	(United Kingdom) Sydney Howard Smith (5)	(United Kingdom) Edward Roy Allen	6–8, 9–7, 6–3, 7–5
1901	(United Kingdom) Sydney Howard Smith (6)	(United Kingdom) John Mycroft Boucher	6–4, 6–0, 7–5
1902	(United Kingdom) Sydney Howard Smith (7)	(United Kingdom) John Mycroft Boucher	6–4, 3–6, 7–5, 4–6, 6–2
1903	(United Kingdom) John Mycroft Boucher	(United Kingdom) Ernest Wills	6–3, 6–1, 6–1
1904	(United Kingdom) Sydney Howard Smith (8)	(New Zealand) Anthony Wilding	6–4, 6–1, 6–2
1905	(United Kingdom) Sydney Howard Smith (9)	(United Kingdom) John Mycroft Boucher	6–4, 5–7, 10–8, 6–4
1906	(United Kingdom) Sydney Howard Smith (10)	(United Kingdom) John Mycroft Boucher	2–6, 6–1, 6–2, 6–2
1907	(United Kingdom) John Mycroft Boucher (2)	(United Kingdom) Samuel Ernest Charlton	6–4, 6–2, 6–2
1908	(United Kingdom) John Mycroft Boucher (3)	(New Zealand) Anthony Wilding	4–6, 3–6, 6–2, 6–2, 6–4
1909	(United Kingdom) John Mycroft Boucher (4)	(United Kingdom) Walter Crawley	8–6, 6–1, 6–3
1910	(United Kingdom) Charles P. Dixon	(Australia) Stanley Doust	8–6, 6–4, 2–6, 6–2
1911	(United Kingdom) Charles P. Dixon (2)	(Australia) Alfred Dunlop	6–4, 6–2, 7–5
1912	(South Africa) Harold Kitson	(United Kingdom) Josiah Ritchie	6–4, 6–1, 0–6, 6–4
1913	(United Kingdom) Charles P. Dixon (3)	(United Kingdom) C. P. Hailey	6–1, 6–4, 6–2
1914	(United Kingdom) Charles P. Dixon (4)	(United Kingdom) Noel O. G. Turnbull	6–4, 6–3, 6–1
1915/1918	Not held (due to World War I)		
1919	No competition		
1920	(United Kingdom) Peter Freeman	(United Kingdom) Cecil L. Sweet-Escott	6–2, 4–6, 6–1, 6–3
1921	(United Kingdom) Josiah Ritchie	(United Kingdom) M. E. Nigel Jones	6–1, 1–6, 6–2, 2–6, 6–3
1922	(Spain) Manuel Alonso	(Spain) Eduardo Flaquer	6–3, 6–4, 7–5
1923	(United Kingdom) John Mycroft Boucher (5)	(United Kingdom) Cecil L. Sweet-Escott	6–3, 7–5, 8–6
1924	(United Kingdom) Gordon Crole Rees	(United Kingdom) John Mycroft Boucher	6–4, 6–4, 10–8
1925	(United Kingdom) Jack Hillyard	(United Kingdom) Elliott W. Crawshay	7–5, 6–2, 8–10, 6–1
1926	(Switzerland) Hector Fisher	(United Kingdom) Peter Freeman	6–1, 4–6, 6–3, 6–3
1927	(United Kingdom) David Williams	(United Kingdom) Jack Hillyard	8–6, 6–1, 3–6, 6–1
1928	(United Kingdom) Eric Peters	(United Kingdom) David Williams	6–4, 6–1, 3–6, 6–0
1929	(United Kingdom) Charles Kingsley	(United Kingdom) William Henry Powell	7–5, 6–4, 4–6, 8–6
1930	(United Kingdom) David Williams	(United Kingdom) Edward Avory	8–6, 3–6, 6–4, 10–8
1931	(Japan) Jiro Sato	(United Kingdom) David Williams	6–4, 6–2, 6–1
1932	(Poland) Ignacy Tłoczyński	(United Kingdom) William Henry Powell	6–3, 7–5, 7–5
1933	(South Africa) Norman Farquharson	(Austria) Herbert Kinzl	6–4, 6–0, 6–2
1934	(Poland) Daniel Prenn	(United Kingdom) Charles Hare	6–2, 6–2, 6–4
1935	(Austria) Hermann von Artens	(Italy) Uberto De Morpurgo	6–1, 6–3, 6–1
1936	(New Zealand) Cam Malfroy	(New Zealand) Alan Steadman	WEA
1937	(New Zealand) Alan Stedman	(United Kingdom) George Godsell	2–6, 6–4, 6–2
1938	(Republic of Ireland) George Lyttleton-Rogers	(Socialist Federal Republic of Yugoslavia) Josip Palada	6–2, 2–6, 6–1
1939	(Romania) Constantin Tănăsescu	(United Kingdom) Murray Deloford	10–12, 6–4, 7–5
1940/1945	Not held (due to World War I)		
1946	(Poland) Czesław Spychała	(Poland) Ignacy Tłoczyński	6–4 3–6 13-11 8–6
1947	(Poland) Czesław Spychała (2)	(New Zealand) Owen Bold	6–3 10–8 6–4
1948	(United Kingdom) Denis Slack	(Poland) Czesław Spychała	wea
1949	(Philippines) Felicisimo Ampon	(South Africa) Syd Levy	4–6 6–2 7–5 6–0
1950	(Hong Kong) Ip Koon Hung	(Poland) Ignacy Tłoczyński	wea
1951	(Australia) Peter Cawthorn	(India) Naresh Kumar	2–6 6–2 6–3
1952	(India) Naresh Kumar	(Australia) Donald Tregonning	6–2 6–3 1–6 6–3
1953	(South Africa) Russell Seymour	(India) Naresh Kumar	6–3 7–5
1954	Competition cancelled		
1955	(South Africa) Owen Williams	(South Africa) Trevor Fancutt	6–3 6–2
1956	(Austria) Alfred Huber	(United Kingdom) Mike Davies	6–3 1–6 9–11 6–4 6–4
1957	(Egypt) Jaroslav Drobný	(United Kingdom) Roger Becker	6–1 9–7
1958	(United Kingdom) Roger Becker	(United Kingdom) Alan Mills	6–4 6–4
1959	(United Kingdom) Bobby Wilson	(United Kingdom) Alan Mills	6–4 6–1
1960	(United Kingdom) Alan Mills	(South Africa) Robin Sanders	6–3 6–2
1961	(South Africa) Francis Rawstorne	(Australia) Warren Jacques	6–8 6–2 6–3
1962	(United Kingdom) Mike Sangster	(United Kingdom) Tony Pickard	6–3 6–4
1963	(Australia) Warren Jacques	(United Kingdom) Alan Mills	10–8 7–5
1964	(South Africa) Bob Hewitt	(Venezuela) Isaías Pimentel	6–4 6–4
1965	(Australia) Roy Emerson	(Australia) Fred Stolle	3–6 6–3 6–2
1966	(South Africa) Bob Hewitt (2)	(Australia) John Newcombe	6–3 8–6
1967	(Australia) John Newcombe	(Australia) Bill Bowrey	7–5 6–2
1968	(Australia) Bill Bowrey	(Australia) Owen Davidson	9–7 6–4
↓ Open era ↓
1969	(United Kingdom) Mark Cox	(United Kingdom) Graham Stilwell	6–4 6–4
1970	(Australia) Ken Rosewall	(Australia) John Newcombe	6–3 6–4
1971	(Australia) Ken Rosewall (2)	(United Kingdom) Roger Taylor	6–1 9–8
1972	(Rhodesia) Andrew Pattison	(United Kingdom) John de Mendoza	6–8 6–4 6–4
1973	(United Kingdom) Roger Taylor	(Australia) Bob Giltinan	9–8 8–6
1974	(United States) Armistead Neely	(United Kingdom) Mike Collins	6–2 6–4

=== Women's singles ===
Year	Champions	Runners-up	Score
1886	(United Kingdom) L. Browne	(United Kingdom) L.C. Stephens	4–6, 6–1, 6–3
1887	(United Kingdom) Maud Watson	(Ireland) Beatrice Langrishe	6–3, 6–3
1888	(United Kingdom) Blanche Bingley Hillyard	(United Kingdom) Miss Pope	6–2, 6–3
1889	(United Kingdom) N Pope	(United Kingdom) Mary Sweet-Escott	6–0, 6–2
1890	Competition cancelled		
1891	(United Kingdom) N Pope (2)	(United Kingdom) Mary Sweet-Escott	4–6, 6–4, 6–1
1892	(United Kingdom) Mary Sweet-Escott	(United Kingdom) Louisa Sweet-Escott	2–6, 6–3, 6–2
1893	(United Kingdom) Ethel Cochrane	(United Kingdom) Emily Stoddart	6–3, 6–4
1894	(England) Helen Jackson	(United Kingdom) Ethel Cochrane	8–6, 6–2
1895	(England) Jane Corder	(England) Helen Jackson	4–6, 7–5, 6–4
1896	Competition cancelled		
1897	(United Kingdom) Henrica Ridding	(United Kingdom) Miss J Cochrane	9–7, 7–5
1898	(United Kingdom) Alice Parr	(United Kingdom) Henrica Ridding	7–5, 7–5
1899	(United Kingdom) Muriel Robb	(United Kingdom) Henrica Ridding	4–6, 6–4, 6–4
1900	(United Kingdom) Constance Hill	(United Kingdom) Alice Parr	5-7, 6–4, 6–2
1901	(United Kingdom) Winifred Longhurst	(United Kingdom) M. Golding	6–1, 4–6, 7–5
1902	(United Kingdom) Winifred Longhurst (2)	(United Kingdom) Constance Hill	8–6, 4–6, 6–4
1903	(United Kingdom) Connie Wilson	(United Kingdom) Winifred Longhurst	6–3, 0–6, 7–5
1904	(United Kingdom) Connie Wilson (2)	(United Kingdom) Maude Garfit	6–3, 6–4
1905	(United States) May Sutton	(United Kingdom) Connie Wilson	6–0, 6–1
1906	(United States) May Sutton (2)	(United Kingdom) Maude Garfit	6–1, 6–0
1907	(United States) May Sutton (3)	(United Kingdom) Toupie Lowther	6–0, 7–5
1908	(United Kingdom) Maude Garfit	(United Kingdom) Mrs G Bruce	6–2, 6–3
1909	(United Kingdom) Maude Garfit (2)	(United Kingdom) Winifred Longhurst	default
1910	(United Kingdom) Helen Aitchison	(United Kingdom) Maude Garfit	8–6, 6–4
1911	(United Kingdom) Dora Boothby	(United Kingdom) Helen Aitchison	8–6, 6–3
1912	(United Kingdom) Edith Hannam	(United Kingdom) Mrs Fletcher	6–1, 6–1
1913	(United Kingdom) Edith Hannam (2)	(United Kingdom) Mrs Fletcher	6–2, 6–2
1914	(United Kingdom) Edith Hannam (3)	(United Kingdom) Mrs Fletcher	6–0, 6–1
1915/1918	Not held (due to World War I)		
1920	(United Kingdom) Edith Hannam (4)	(United Kingdom) Mrs Fletcher	6–0, 4–6, 6–1
1921	(United Kingdom) Helen Leisk	(United Kingdom) Edith Hannam	6–2, 6–2
1922	(United Kingdom) Edith Hannam (5)	(United Kingdom) Helen Leisk	6–3, 1–6, 6–4
1923	(United Kingdom) Kathleen Raikes	(United Kingdom) Edith Hannam	8–6, 0–6, 6–3
1924	(United States) Elizabeth Ryan	(United Kingdom) Edith Hannam	6–3, 6–3
1925	(United Kingdom) Phyllis Satterthwaite	(United Kingdom) Kathleen Bevir	8–10, 6–0, 6–1
1926	(United Kingdom) Gladys Seel	(United Kingdom) Mrs R Fletcher	6–0, 6–4
1927	(United Kingdom) Phyllis Satterthwaite (2)	(United Kingdom) Gladys Seel	6–4, 6–2
1928	(United Kingdom) Eleanor Rose	(United Kingdom) Effie Hemmant	6–3, 6–3
1929	(United Kingdom) Eleanor Rose (2)	(United Kingdom) Effie Hemmant	6–2, 2–6, 6–4
1930	(United Kingdom) Effie Hemmant	(United Kingdom) Eleanor Rose	7–5, 6–4
1931	(United Kingdom) Effie Hemmant (2)	(United Kingdom) Jeanette Morfey	6–3, 5–7, 6–3
1932	(Poland) Jadwiga Jędrzejowska	(Germany) Marie-Louise Horn	8–6, 6–2
1933	(United Kingdom) Mary Hardwick	(United Kingdom) Christabel Wheatcroft	6–0, 6–4
1934	(Denmark) Hilde Krahwinkel Sperling	(United Kingdom) Sheila Chuter	6–2, 6–0
1935	(Poland) Jadwiga Jędrzejowska	(United Kingdom) Susan Noel	6–3, 6–2
1936	(Poland) Jadwiga Jędrzejowska(2)	(Austria) Rosl Kraus	4–6, 6–2, 6–1
1937	(France) Simonne Mathieu	(Nazi Germany) Irmgard Rost	6–3, 6–4
1938	(France) Simonne Mathieu (2)	(United Kingdom) Gladys Seel	6–4, 6–4
1939	(France) Simonne Mathieu (3)	(United Kingdom) Betty Clements	6–0, 6–4
1940/1945	Not held (due to World War II)		
1946	(United Kingdom) Gem Hoahing	(United Kingdom) Joy Hibbert	6–1, 6–2
1947	(United Kingdom) Joan Curry	(United Kingdom) Wendy Stork	6–2, 6–2
1948	(United Kingdom) Joan Curry (2)	(United Kingdom) Georgie Woodgate	6–3, 7–5
1949	(United Kingdom) Georgie Woodgate	(Czechoslovakia) Helena Straubeová	4–6, 6–3, 6–2
1950	(United States) Barbara Scofield	(United Kingdom) Georgie Woodgate	9–7, 6–2
1951	(United Kingdom) Angela Mortimer	(United Kingdom) Lorna Cornell	6–3, 2–6, 6–2
1952	(Australia) Beryl Penrose	(South Africa) Doreen Wedderburn	6–2, 4–6, 6–4
1953	(Bermuda) Heather Brewer	(United Kingdom) Rosemary Walsh	6–3, 6–1
1954	(Japan) Sachiko Kamo	(United Kingdom) Jenny Middleton	divided title due to rain
1955	(Argentina) Mary Terán de Weiss	(United Kingdom) Ann Haydon	1–6, 6–1, 6–2
1956	(United Kingdom) Ann Haydon	(Australia) Daphne Seeney	6–2, 6–3
1957	(United Kingdom) Angela Mortimer (2)	(United Kingdom) Ann Haydon	6–2, 6–4
1958	(United Kingdom) Angela Mortimer (3)	(United Kingdom) Ann Haydon	6–2, 6–2
1959	(United Kingdom) Angela Mortimer (4)	(United Kingdom) Ann Haydon	5-7, 6–3, 6–4
1960	(United Kingdom) Angela Mortimer (5)	(South Africa) Bernice Carr Vukovich	11–9, 6–3
1961	(United Kingdom) Ann Haydon (2)	(United Kingdom) Jill Mills	4–6, 6–2, 6–2
1962	(United Kingdom) Ann Haydon (3)	(United Kingdom) Jill Mills	6–4, 6–3
1963	(United Kingdom) Carol Rosser	(United Kingdom) Lorna Cawthorn	6–3, 6–3
1964	(Brazil) Maria Bueno	(United Kingdom) Christine Truman	6–3, 6–2
1965	(South Africa) Annette Van Zyl	(United Kingdom) Ann Jones	6–2, 6–0
1966	(Brazil) Maria Bueno	(South Africa) Annette Van Zyl	6–2, 6–0
1967	(Australia) Judy Tegart	(United Kingdom) Ann Jones	6–4, 6–4
1968	(United States) Kristy Pigeon	(Australia) Fay Toyne Moore	6–2, 6–0
↓ Open era ↓
1969	(Australia) Margaret Court	(United Kingdom) Winnie Shaw	6–4, 6–4
1970	(Australia) Evonne Goolagong	(United States) Patti Hogan	6–0, 8–6
1971	(United Kingdom) Virginia Wade	(Australia) Judy Dalton	6–3, 6–4
1972	(Australia) Kerry Melville	(United Kingdom) Virginia Wade	7–5, 6–2
1973	(United States) Julie Heldman	(Australia) Dianne Fromholtz	1–6, 6–1, 11–9
1974	(United States) Julie Heldman (2)	(United Kingdom) Sue Mappin	6–3, 6–4

== See also ==
- Tennis Wales
