= Torquay Open =

Defunct tennis tournament
- Founded: 1879
- Abolished: 1974
- Location: Torquay, Devon, England
- Venue: Torquay Lawn Tennis Club
- Surface: Grass

The Torquay Open was grass court tennis event founded in 1879. In 1881 it was known as the Torquay Lawn Tennis Tournmament. that was held at the Winter Garden, Torquay, Devon, England. It continued under that name until after World War II when it was known as the Torquay Open In 1971 the tobacco company Rothmans International took over sponsorship of the event and it was branded as the Rothmans Torquay Tournament until 1974 when their sponsorship ended.

This tournament though no longer part of the international tour is still being staged today as the Torbay Open Tennis Tournament.

== History ==
A Torquay tennis tournament was founded as early as 1879. In 1881 the event was known as the Torquay Lawn Tennis Tournament and played at the Winter Garden, Torquay, Devon, England. In 1887 it became an open event for the women to play for the first time and was branded as the Torquay & Shaldon Open. The tournament was held annually, with the exception of world war's one and two. Following the second world war the tournament known by then as the Torquay Open Lawn Tennis Tournament at least up to 1960. In 1971 Rothmans International took over sponsorship of the event and it was renamed as the Rothmans Torquay Tournament until 1974, when Rothman's pulled out of sports sponsorship and this tournament ended as part international world wide tour. It is still being staged today as the Torbay Open Tennis Tournament.

== Finals ==
=== Men's singles ===
Incomplete roll included:

Year	Champions	Runners-up	Score
Torquay Lawn Tennis Tournmament
1880	(United Kingdom) Ernest W. S. K. Maconchy	(England) C. Hughes	6-0, 6-0
1881	(United Kingdom) Ernest W. S. K. Maconchy (2)	(Ireland) Thomas Arembery Tombe	6-1, 6-0
1887	(United Kingdom) Ernest Wool Lewis	(England) Wilfred Milne	7-5, 6-2, 7-5
1888	(United Kingdom) Ernest Wool Lewis (2)	(United Kingdom) Herbert Chipp	3-6, 0-6, 6-1, 6-4, 6-0
1889	(United Kingdom) Ernest Wool Lewis (3)	(United Kingdom) Edward James Avory	1-6, 6-5, 6-3
1890	(United Kingdom) Ernest Wool Lewis (4)	(United Kingdom) Edward James Avory	6-1, 6-2, 6-3
1905	(United Kingdom) Harold Michelmore (2)	(United Kingdom) George Alan Thomas	6-4, 6-2
1907	(United Kingdom) Harold Michelmore (2)	(United Kingdom) J.S. Talbot	6-3, 6-4
1908	(United Kingdom) Harold Michelmore (3)	(Australia) Les Poidevin	w.o.
1914/1918	Not held (due to world war one)		
1923	(United Kingdom) Philip Robert Broadway	(Australia) Sydney Ford	6-1, 6-1, 6-4
1930	(Japan) Jiro Satoh	(United Kingdom) A.C.D. Campbell	6-0, 6-2
1934	(United Kingdom) Don Butler	(United Kingdom) Jack Lysaght	10-12, 6-3, 6-4
1935	(United Kingdom) Don Butler (2)	(United Kingdom) John Temple Bouverie Leader	7-5, 6-2
1936	(United Kingdom) Charles Haree	(United Kingdom) Frank Wilde	6-3, 6-3
1937	(United Kingdom) Eric Filby	(Romania) Cristea Caralulis	6-1, 9-11, 6-1
1938	(United Kingdom) Eric Filby (2)	(Republic of China (1912–1949)) Kho Sin-Kie	6-4, 6-4
1939	(United Kingdom) Eric Filby (3)	(Poland) Ernest Wittman	6-2, 6-3
1940/1945	Not held (due to world war two)		
Torquay Open
1946	(United Kingdom) Henry Billington	(Poland) Ignacy Tloczynski	7-5, 6-0
1947	(New Zealand) John Barry	(New Zealand) Jeff Robson	2-6, 6-3, 6-2
1948	(United Kingdom) Tim Lewis	(United Kingdom) David Anderton	6-0, 6-2
1949	(United Kingdom) Tony Mottram	(United Kingdom) Paddy Roberts	9-7, 7-5
1950	(United Kingdom) Gerry Oakley	(United Kingdom) Paddy Roberts	6-4, 6-4
1951	(United Kingdom) Paddy Roberts	(Poland) Ignacy Tloczynski	6-3, 6-1
1952	(Egypt) Jaroslav Drobný	(Australia) Ian Ayre	6-3, 6-1
1953	(Australia) Ian Ayre	(United Kingdom) Colin Hannam	6-4, 6-2
1954	(Egypt) Jaroslav Drobný (2)	(Australia) Jack Arkinstall	6-0, 6-3
1959	(United Kingdom) Mike Sangster	(United Kingdom) Julian L. P. Coni	9-7, 6-4
Open era
Rothmans Torquay Tournmament
1971	(India) Premjit Lall	(United Kingdom) Ken Weatherley	6-4, 7-5
1974	(Australia) Graeme Thomson	(United Kingdom) Martin Cornish	6-4, 6-4

=== Women's singles ===
(Incomplete roll)

Notes: In 1924 and 1925 there were two versions of the tournament held in August on grass courts and October on clay courts.

Year	Champions	Runners-up	Score
Torquay Lawn Tennis Tournmament
1887	(United Kingdom) Blanche Bingley Hillyard	(England) Maud Watson	4-6, 6-2, 6-3
1888	(United Kingdom) Miss Mockler	(United Kingdom) Alice Foley	6-4, 6-4
1890	(England) Miss Wolfe	(England) Miss Fisher	7-5, 6-4
1899	(United Kingdom) Winifred Longhurst	(United Kingdom) K. Hughes	6-2, 6-1
1900	(United Kingdom) Winifred Longhurst (2)	(England) Miss Smythe	6-2, 6-2
1901	(United Kingdom) Winifred Longhurst (3)	(England) Miss Collett	6-1, 6-1
1902	(United Kingdom) Ethel Thomson	(United Kingdom) Edith Boucher	6-4, 6-1
1903	(United Kingdom) Edith Boucher	(United Kingdom) M. Stonham	6-1, 3-6, 7-5
1904	(United Kingdom) Edith Boucher (2)	(United Kingdom) Miss Collett	6-0, 6-4
1905	(United Kingdom) Meriel Lucas	(United Kingdom) Charlotte Everard	6-3, 6-1
1906	(United Kingdom) Meriel Lucas (2)	(United Kingdom) M. Stonham	6-2, 6-4
1907	(United Kingdom) Edith Boucher (2)	(United Kingdom) Meriel Lucas	3-6, 6-0, 6-3
1908	(United Kingdom) Meriel Lucas (3)	(United Kingdom) Nora Bawden	3-6, 6-4, 6-1
1909	(United Kingdom) Elsie Lane	(United Kingdom) Evelyn de Vere Scott	6-0, 6-1
1910	(United Kingdom) M. Fergus	(United Kingdom) Edith Longhurst	6-4, 6-3
1911	(United Kingdom) Beryl Tulloch	(United Kingdom) Nora Bawden	6-3, 6-3
1912	(United Kingdom) Nora Bawden	(United Kingdom) E. Miller	divided prizes
1913	(United Kingdom) Madeline Fisher O'Neill	(United Kingdom) Nora Bawden	6-2, 9-11, 7-5
1914/1918	Not held (due to world war one)		
1920	(United Kingdom) Phyllis Satterthwaite	(United Kingdom) Miss Davies	6-1, 6-1
1921	(United Kingdom) G.M. Head	(United Kingdom) Nora Bawden	6-3. 3-6, 6-4
1922	(United Kingdom) Edith Hannam (3)	(United Kingdom) Miss Robertson	6-0, 7-5
1923	(United Kingdom) Helen Bourne	(United Kingdom) P. Robertson	6-3, 6-4
1924 (Aug)	(United Kingdom) Mrs Hopper	(United Kingdom) A G Buckner	6-2, 6-2
1924 (Oct)	(United States) Elizabeth Ryan	(United Kingdom) Ermyntrude Harvey	6-4, 6-1
1925 (Aug)	(United Kingdom) Mrs R. Bruce May	(United Kingdom) Mrs Lawrence	6-2, 6-1
1925 (Oct)	(United Kingdom) Ariadne Rodocanachi	(United Kingdom) Phyllis French	7-5, 6-4
1926	(United Kingdom) Davina Gordon	(United Kingdom) Cristobel Hardie	6-3, 6-2
1927	(United Kingdom) Davina Gordon (2)	(United Kingdom) Katherine Lewis	divided prizes
1928	(United Kingdom) Davina Gordon (3)	(United Kingdom) Gethyn Harry	6-3, 6-1
1929	(United Kingdom) Elsa McAlpin Haylock	(United Kingdom) Andrée Lucas	6-3, 3-6, 6-3
1930	(United Kingdom) Elsa McAlpin Haylock (2)	(United Kingdom) Gethyn Harry	6-4, 6-3
1931	(United Kingdom) Mary McIlquham	(United Kingdom) Elsa McAlpin Haylock	4-6, 6-1, 6-2
1932	(United Kingdom) Peggy Scriven	(United Kingdom) Andrée Lucas	6-1, 6-1
1934	(United Kingdom) Billie Yorke	(United Kingdom) Jean Saunders	6-4, 6-3
1935	(United Kingdom) Jean Saunders	(United Kingdom) Andrée Lucas	6-2, 6-2
1936	(Weimar Republic) Irmgard Rost	(United Kingdom) Mary Whitmarsh	6-0, 6-0
1937	(Weimar Republic) Irmgard Rost (2)	(United Kingdom) Billie Yorke	8-6, 6-3
1938	(United Kingdom) Andrée Lucas	(United Kingdom) Rita Jarvis	7-5, 1-6, 6-2
1939	(United Kingdom) Andrée Lucas (2)	(United Kingdom) Jean Saunders	6-4, 5-7, 9-7
1940/1945	Not held (due to world war one)		
Torquay Open
1946	(United Kingdom) Joan Curry	(United Kingdom) Jean Quertier	8-6, 6-1
1947	(United Kingdom) Joan Curry (2)	(United Kingdom) P. Merrix	6-2, 6-2
1948	(United Kingdom) Joan Curry (3)	(United Kingdom) Peggy Dawson-Scott	6-2, 6-1
1949	(United Kingdom) Joan Curry (4)	(United Kingdom) Joy Gannon	6-3, 6-3
1950	(United Kingdom) Elsie Hamilton Phillips	(United Kingdom) Lorna Cornell	3-6, 6-3, 6-4
1951	(United Kingdom) Angela Mortimer	(United Kingdom) Jenny Middleton	6-2, 6-1
1952	(United Kingdom) Rita Jarvis Anderson	(United Kingdom) Hilary Stebbings	6-0, 7-5
1953	(United Kingdom) Angela Mortimer (2)	(United Kingdom) Pat Ward	9-7, 8-6
1954	(United Kingdom) Pat Ward	(South Africa) Betsy Abbas	6-0, 6-3
1956	(United Kingdom) Sonia Cox	(United Kingdom) V. Martin	6-4, 6-2
1958	(United Kingdom) Joan Curry (5)	(New Zealand) Sonia Cox	5-7, 6-0, 6-4
1959	(United Kingdom) Sheila Armstrong	(United Kingdom) Phyllis Edwards	11-9, 6-1
1960	(United Kingdom) Elaine Watson Shenton	(New Zealand) Sonia Cox Preston	6-4, 6-4
1961	(United Kingdom) Margaret R. O'Donnell	(United Kingdom) Carole Rosser	6-2, 11-9
1962	(United Kingdom) Elaine Watson Shenton (2)	(United Kingdom) Frances Walton	7-5, 8-10, 6-2
Open era
Rothmans Torquay Tournmament
1971	(Australia) Susan Alexander	(United Kingdom) Penny Hardgrave	6-2, 6-1
1974	(United Kingdom) Sue Barker	(United Kingdom) Annette Coe	6-1, 6-1
