= Scottish Championships (tennis) =

Defunct tennis tournament
- Tour: Pre-open era (1877–1967); Open era (1968–73)
- Founded: 1878
- Abolished: 1994
- Editions: 106
- Location: Bridge of Allan, Edinburgh, Glasgow, Moffat, Peebles, St Andrews, Wemyss Bay, Scotland
- Venue: Bridge of Allan LTC (1908–12, 1914); Edinburgh Craiglockhart LTC (1913,1919–29, 1900, 1946–57, 1959–60, 1963, 1965–1970); Grange Club, Edinburgh (1878–92, 1994); Glasgow (1958); Moffat Beachgrove Grounds (1895–1907); Peebles LTC (1930–39); St Andrews LTC (1893); Inverkip Rovers Club (1894)
- Surface: Grass / outdoor

The Scottish Championships its original name until 1994 also known as the Scottish Lawn Tennis Championships, and the Scottish Grass Court Championships, was an outdoor tennis event held from 1878 through 1994. It was played at various locations throughout its duration including Bridge of Allan, Edinburgh, Glasgow, Moffat, Peebles, and St Andrews in Scotland. The dates the tournament was held fluctuated between June and August annually.

== History ==
The Scottish Lawn Tennis Championships tournament began in 1878. It was originally held at the Grange Club in Edinburgh until 1892. It returned only one more time in 1994. In 1893 the event was played once only in St Andrews. It was then played at Moffat during the late 1890s and most of the 1900s. In 1908 it changed location again and the championships were staged at Bridge of Allan until 1914. The championships returned to Edinburgh for a second time at what would become its semi-permanent home, Craiglockhart, from 1913, 1919 to 1929, then again 1946 through to 1960, 1963, then 1965 to 1975. During all of the 1930s the championships were staged at the Peebles Hotel Hydro courts. The championships was staged only once during its time in Glasgow in 1958.

The tournament featured both men's and women's singles competition as well as same sex and mixed doubles. The tournament survived for a period of 116 years until 1994.

Between 1997 and 2002, a tournament called The Scottish Tennis Championships was part of the ATP Challenger Tour. It was played at the Craiglockhart Tennis Centre in Edinburgh on green clay courts. The 2015 ATP Challenger Tour indoor event in Glasgow was also called The Scottish Championships.

== Finals ==
Notes: Challenge round: The final round of a tournament, in which the winner of a single-elimination phase faces the previous year's champion, who plays only that one match. The challenge round was used in the early history of tennis (from 1877 through 1921) in some tournaments, not all. * indicates challenger.

=== Men's singles ===
Year	Champions	Runner-up	Score
1878	(Scotland) James Patten McDougall	?	?
1879	(Scotland) Leslie Balfour-Melville	?	6–1, 6–1, 6–0
1880	(Scotland) James Patten McDougall (2)	(Scotland) Leslie Balfour-Melville	?
1881	(Scotland) John Galbraith Horn	(United Kingdom) A. L. Davidson	6–1, 6–5
1882	(Scotland) John Galbraith Horn (2)	(United Kingdom) F. A. Fairlie	6–2, 4–6, 6–2, 6–3
1883	(Scotland) John Galbraith Horn (3)	(England) Arthur Walton Fuller	3–6, 6–3, 6–4, 7–5
1884	(England) Reginald Gamble	(Scotland) John Galbraith Horn	6–3, 10–8, 2–6, 6–3
1885	(United Kingdom) Patrick Bowes-Lyon	(Scotland) Archibald Thomson	6–3, 6–2, 6–4
1886	(United Kingdom) Patrick Bowes-Lyon (2)	(Scotland) Herbert Bowes-Lyon	6–1, 4–6, 6–1, 6–1
1887	(England) Harry Grove	(United Kingdom) Patrick Bowes-Lyon	6–3, 6–3, 1–6, 2–6, 6–2
1888	(United Kingdom) Patrick Bowes-Lyon (3)	(England) Harry Grove	1–6, 0–6, 10–8, 6–2, 3–1 ret.
1889	(Ireland) Ernest Browne	(United Kingdom) Patrick Bowes-Lyon	6–4, 6–4, 6–2
1890	(Ireland) Ernest Browne (2)	(England) George Richmond Mewburn	6–3, 3–6, 6–1, 6–4
1891	(Ireland) Ernest Browne (3)	(Australia) Arthur Benjamin Carvosso	6–3, 6–3, 6–1, 6–1
1892	(England) Arthur Gore	(Ireland) Ernest Browne	w.o.
1893	(England) Arthur Gore (2)	(Scotland) Richard Millar Watson	6–3, 7–5 4–6, 7–5
1894	(Scotland) Richard Millar Watson	(England) Arthur Gore	w.o.
1895	(England) Reginald Doherty	(Scotland) Richard Millar Watson *	6–1, 6–1, 6–1
1896	(England) Reginald Doherty (2)	(England) Roy Allen *	13–11, 6–4 retired.
1897	(England) Reginald Doherty (3)	(England) Laurence Doherty *	w.o.
1898	(England) Laurence Doherty	(England) Reginald Doherty *	w.o.
1899	(England) Ernest Douglas Black	(United Kingdom) Wilberforce Eaves	6–4, 4–6, 6–2, 5–7, 6–4
1900	(England) Charles Pritchett	(United Kingdom) Roy Allen	6–8, 9–7, 6–3, 7–5
1901	(England) Wilberforce Eaves	(United Kingdom) John Mycroft Boucher	6–4, 6–0, 7–5
1902	(United Kingdom) Frank Lorymer Riseley	(United Kingdom) John Mycroft Boucher	6–4, 3–6, 7–5, 4–6, 6–2
1903	(United Kingdom) Frederick William Payn	(United Kingdom) Ernest Wills	6–3, 6–1, 6–1
1904	(New Zealand) Anthony Wilding	(Scotland) Charles James Glenny	6–1, 6–1, 6–2
1905	(Scotland) Alexander Morrice Mackay	(United Kingdom) John Mycroft Boucher	6–4, 5–7, 10–8, 6–4
1906	(Scotland) Alexander Morrice Mackay (2)	(United Kingdom) John Mycroft Boucher	2–6, 6–1, 6–2, 6–2
1907	(Scotland) Alexander Morrice Mackay (3)	(United Kingdom) Samuel Ernest Charlton	6–4, 6–2, 6–2
1908	(Canada) Robert Powell	(New Zealand) Anthony Wilding	4–6, 3–6, 6–2, 6–2, 6–4
1909	(United Kingdom) Theodore Mavrogordato	(United Kingdom) Walter Crawley	8–6, 6–1, 6–3
1910	(Canada) Robert Powell (2)	(Belgium) Georges Watson	6–1, 6–2, 6–4
1911	(Australia) Alfred Dunlop	(United Kingdom) William L. Clements	6–4, 6–4
1912	(Ireland) James Cecil Parke	(Australia) Stanley Doust	w.o.
1913	(Australia) Horace Rice	(United Kingdom) James Charles Glenny	6–2, 8–6, 6–1
1914	(Republic of Ireland) John F. Stokes	(Republic of Ireland) Noel O. G. Turnbull	6–4, 6–0, 6–2
1915/1918	Not held (due to World War I)		
1919	(United Kingdom) Clive Branfoot	(United Kingdom) Leith W. Ross	0–6, 6–2, 7–5, 6–3
1920	(South Africa) Cecil R. Blackbeard	(United Kingdom) Charles P. Dixon	6–2, 14–12, 9–7
1921	(United Kingdom) G. M. Elliott	(United Kingdom) Alex Blair	3–6, 6–3, 6–3, 2–6, 6–4
1922	(South Africa) Pat Spence	(United Kingdom) Alex Blair	6–0, 2–6, 7–5, 1–6, 6–3
1923	(South Africa) Pat Spence (2)	(United Kingdom) Eric Rayner	6–2, 10–8, 6–3
1924	(United Kingdom) Charles Kingsley	(United Kingdom) G. M. Elliott	6–2, 6–1
1925	(United Kingdom) Alex Blair	(United Kingdom) E. C. McIntosh	8–6, 6–1, 9–7
1926	(Scotland) Ian Collins	(United Kingdom) John G. Locke	6–4, 6–2, 6–3
1927	(Scotland) Ian Collins (2)	(United Kingdom) D. L. Craig	6–4, 6–3, 6–3
1928	(Scotland) Ian Collins (3)	(Japan) Yoshiro Ota	6–4, 6–2, 6–3
1929	(United Kingdom) J. Colin Gregory	(Scotland) Ian Collins	6–2, 6–3, 9–7
1930	(Australia) Jack Crawford	(United Kingdom) J. Colin Gregory	divided title
1931	(South Africa) Vernon Kirby	(United Kingdom) Norman Farquharson	6–2, 13–11
1932	(United Kingdom) Edward Avory	(United Kingdom) Josiah Ritchie	6–2, 7–5, 6–8, 6–3
1933	(Scotland) Donald MacPhail	(United Kingdom) E. L. Percival	divided title
1934	(United States) Teddy Burwell	(United Kingdom) Jack Lysaght	6–8, 4–6, 6–3, 6–1, 6–2
1935	(Canada) Robert Murray	(Scotland) Ian Collins	8–6, 9–11, 6–4, 6–3
1936	(Scotland) Donald MacPhail (2)	(Scotland) Ian Collins	0–6, 6–1, 4–6, 6–1, 9–7
1937	(United Kingdom) Henry Billington	(United Kingdom) Laurie Shaffi	6–2, 2–6, 6–3
1938	(United Kingdom) Murray Deloford	(Scotland) Donald MacPhail	6–3, 3–6, 6–4, 6–4
1939	(Scotland) Donald MacPhail (3)	(Argentina) Alejo Russell	11–9, 6–4
1940/1945	Not held (due to World War II)		
1946	(Scotland) Donald MacPhail (4)	(United Kingdom) Fergus Davidson	6–2, 6–1, 6–1
1947	(Poland) Tadeusz Sławeck	(United Kingdom) Robin R. Welsh	3–6, 6–3, 8–6, 9–7
1948	(Hungary) Geza Eros	(United Kingdom) John Rutherglen	7–5, 3–6, 8–6, 6–3
1949	(South Africa) Nigel Cockburn	(United Kingdom) Gerald Oakley	4–6, 6–3, 6–4
1950	(Australia) Adrian Quist	(Poland) Tadeusz Sławecki	divided title
1951	(South Africa) Eric Sturgess	(United Kingdom) Arthur G. Roberts	11–9, 6–3, 8–6
1952	(Australia) Ian Ayre	(Philippines) Felicisimo Ampon	5–7, 9–7, 6–2, 9–7
1953	(United Kingdom) Billy Knight	(United Kingdom) Tony Pickard	6–4, 10–8, 6–0
1954	(United Kingdom) Bobby Wilson	(United States) Wayne Van Hoorhees	6–3, 6–1, 10–8
1955	(United Kingdom) Tony Pickard	(United Kingdom) Geoff Ward	6–3, 6–3, 6–2
1956	(Scotland) Colin Baxter	(United Kingdom) G. R. Chisholm	6–2, 6–1, 6–4
1957	(United Kingdom) Reginald Bennett	(United Kingdom) Alan Mills	14–12, 8–6
1958	(Scotland) Colin Baxter (2)	(United Kingdom) John R. Maguire	6–3, 6–4, 6–0
1959	(Scotland) Colin Baxter (3)	(United Kingdom) John R. Maguire	6–0, 6–3
1960	(United Kingdom) John R. Maguire	(Scotland) Colin Baxter	6–3, 6–1
1961	(United Kingdom) Malcolm Gracie	(Scotland) Colin Baxter	8–6, 6–1
1962	(Scotland) James T. Wood	(United Kingdom) Harry Matheson	6–4, 0–6, 9–7
1963	(United Kingdom) Harry Matheson	(Scotland) James T. Wood	6–2, 3–6, 8–6
1964	(Scotland) James T. Wood (2)	(United Kingdom) John Clifton	6–4, 6–4
1965	(United Kingdom) John Clifton	(United Kingdom) Harry Matheson	6–3, 3–6, 8–6
1966	(United Kingdom) John Clifton (2)	(Australia) Graham Primrose	4–6, 6–4, 6–1
1967	(Australia) Graham Primrose	(Australia) John Cottrill	7–5, 6–2
↓ Open era ↓
1968	(United Kingdom) John Clifton (3)	(Australia) Graham Primrose	6–2, 7–5
1969	(United Kingdom) John Clifton (4)	(United Kingdom) Paul Hutchins	6–2, 2–6, 6–4
1970	(Australia) Ray Ruffels	(United Kingdom) John Clifton	6–1, 11–9
1971	(United Kingdom) John Clifton (5)	(United Kingdom) Harry Matheson	6–4, 6–4
1972	(United Kingdom) John Clifton (6)	(United Kingdom) David Lloyd	divided title
1973	(India) Jay Royappa	(United Kingdom) John Clifton	6–4, 6–3
1974	(United Kingdom) John Clifton (7)	(South Africa) Keith Brebnor	6-0, 6-2
1975	(Rhodesia) Tony Fawcett	(Australia) Ernie Ewert	4–6, 6–4, 6–3
1976	(New Zealand) Chris Lewis	(United Kingdom) C. Martin Robinson	6–2, 6–1
1977	(United Kingdom) Ken Revie	(United Kingdom) Harry L. Roulston	6–3, 3–6, 6–1
1978	(Australia) Dale Collings	(United Kingdom) Michael Appleton	3–6, 6–2, 15–13
1979	(United Kingdom) Michael Appleton	(United Kingdom) Donald J. Watt	6–4, 6–4
1980	(United Kingdom) Jeremy Bates	(United Kingdom) Keith Gilbert	7–5, 7–6
1981	(United Kingdom) Michael Appleton (2)	(United Kingdom) Donald J. Watt	7–6, 6–1
1982	(United Kingdom) Donald J. Watt	(United Kingdom) Ken Revie	6–4, 6–1
1983	(United Kingdom) Buster Mottram	(United States) Mike Bauer	7–6, 6–7, 6–4
1984	(United States) Steve Denton	(United States) John McEnroe	?
1985	(United Kingdom) Jeremy Bates	(United Kingdom) Colin Dowdeswell	6–2, 6–4
1986	(United Kingdom) Robin Scott	(United Kingdom) Colin McGill	
1987	(Sweden) Anders Järryd	(Ecuador) Andrés Gómez	divided title
1988	(Sweden) Peter Lundgren	(Czechoslovakia) Jakob Hlasek	?
1989	(United States) John McEnroe	(United States) Jimmy Connors	7–6^{(7–2)}, 7–6^{(7–4)}
1990	(South Africa) Lan Bale	(South Africa) John Laffnie de Jager	?
1991	(United Kingdom) Colin McGill	(United States) John McEnroe	?
1992	(United Kingdom) Paul Hand	(United Kingdom) Phil Cooper	divided title
1993	(United Kingdom) B. Cowan	(Zambia) D. Sweeney	7–6, 7–5
1994	(United Kingdom) Ken Wood	(United Kingdom) Malcom Watt	7–6, 6–2

=== Women's singles ===
Year	Champions	Runner-up	Score
1886	(England) Mable Boulton	(Scotland) Julia MacKenzie	3–6, 6–0, 6–2, 4–6, 6–2
1887	(Ireland) Connie Butler	(England) Mable Boulton	6–2, 6–2, 3–6, 8–6
1888	(Ireland) Connie Butler (2)	(England) Annie Dod	6–3, 6–3
1889	(Ireland) Connie Butler (3)	(Scotland) D. Patterson	6–0 6–2
1890	(England) Helen Jackson	(Scotland) D. Patterson	6–1, 6–0
1891	(England) Helen Jackson (2)	(England) Jane Corder	4–6, 6–0, 6–1
1892	(England) Helen Jackson (3)	(Scotland) Lottie Paterson	7–5, 6–1
1893	(England) Jane Corder	(Scotland) Miss Moir	6–0, 6–4
1894	(Scotland) Lottie Paterson	(Scotland) Miss Burns	6–1, 6–0
1895	(Scotland) Lottie Paterson (2)	(United Kingdom) Ida Cressy	8–6, 6–3
1896	(Scotland) Lottie Paterson (3)	(England) Ida Cressy	6–3, 8–6
1897	(England) Minnie Hunter	(England) Lucy Kendal	6–4, 7–5
1898	(United Kingdom) Madeline O'Neill	(England) Minnie Hunter	6–3, 4–6, 6–4
1899	(United Kingdom) Charlotte Cooper	(England) Minnie Hunter	6–3, 8–6
1900	(England) Minnie Hunter (2)	(United Kingdom) Helen Pillans	6–3, 8–6
1901	(England) Muriel Robb	(England) Minnie Hunter	6–1 4–6 7–5
1902	(Scotland) Alice Maud Ferguson	(Scotland) Mary Curtis-Whyte	6–2, 6–2
1903	(United Kingdom) M. Crawford	(Scotland) Miss Stoltz	8–6, 6–2
1904	(England) Winifred Longhurst	(Scotland) Alice Maud Ferguson	6–3, 6–2
1905	(Scotland) Mary Curtis-Whyte	(Scotland) Alice Maud Ferguson	6–4, 6–3
1906	(Scotland) Alice Maud Ferguson (2)	(Scotland) Mary Curtis-Whyte	6–3, 8–6
1907	(Scotland) Alice Maud Ferguson (3)	(Scotland) Mary Curtis-Whyte	6–2, 3–6, 6–2
1908	(United Kingdom) Maude Garfit	(Scotland) Alice Maud Ferguson	6–3, 6–4
1909	(United Kingdom) Maude Garfit (2)	(Scotland) M. Fergus	6–2, 4–6, 6–1
1910	(United Kingdom) Ethel Thomson Larcombe	(Scotland) Mary Welsh	6–0, 6–1
1911	(United Kingdom) Ethel Thomson Larcombe (2)	(Scotland) Mary Welsh	6–1, 6–4
1912	(United Kingdom) Ethel Thomson Larcombe (3)	(Scotland) Mary Welsh	w.o
1913	(Scotland) Mary Welsh	(Scotland) M. Fergus	6–2, retired
1914	(Scotland) Mary Welsh (2)	(Scotland) M. Fergus	6–2, 1–6, 7–5
1915/1919	Not held (due to World War I)		
1920	(United Kingdom) M. Thom	(Scotland) Mary Welsh	6–4, 6–3
1921	(Scotland) Mary Welsh (3)	(Scotland) M. Fergus	4–6, 6–2, 6–2
1922	(Scotland) Mary Welsh (4)	(United Kingdom) Mrs Hall	6–0, 6–2
1923	(Scotland) Mary Welsh (5)	(United Kingdom) Mrs Wilson	6–0, 6–1
1924	(United Kingdom) M Thom (2)	(Scotland) Mary Welsh	7–5, 3–6, 6–2
1925	(United Kingdom) M. Thom (3)	(United Kingdom) M. Jenkins	6–4, 6–1
1926	(United Kingdom) M. Thom (4)	(United Kingdom) M. Ferguson	6–3, 4–6, 6–4
1927	(United Kingdom) Ruth Watson	(United Kingdom) Naomi Trentham	6–1, 6–1
1928	(United Kingdom) Joan Ridley	(United Kingdom) Gwen Sterry	6–2, 6–3
1929	(United Kingdom) Joan Ridley (2)	(United Kingdom) Helen Barr	6–0, 6–4
1930	(Scotland) Winifred Mason	(Australia) Esna Robertson	3–6, 6–3, 6–3
1931	(United Kingdom) Gwen Sterry	(Australia) Esna Robertson	7–5, 6–4
1932	(Australia) Esna Robertson	(United Kingdom) Olga Webb	1–6, 6–1, 6–3
1933	(Scotland) Winifred Mason (2)	(United Kingdom) Kathleen Robertson	6–2, 6–2
1934	(Australia) Joan Hartigan	(United Kingdom) Susan Noel	5–7, 14–12, 7–5
1935	(Chile) Anita Lizana	(United Kingdom) Joan Ingram	6–3, 4–6, 7–5
1936	(Chile) Anita Lizana (2)	(United Kingdom) Mary Hardwick	6–2, 6–0
1937	(Chile) Anita Lizana (3)	(Australia) Esna Robertson	6–1, 6–1
1938	(United Kingdom) Mary Hardwick	(United States) Dorothy Bundy	6–2, 7–5
1939	(Australia) Nancy MacPherson-Grant	(Australia) Esna Robertson	6–3, 6–2
1940/1945	Not held (due to World War II)		
1946	(Chile) Anita Ellis (4)	(Republic of Ireland) Betty Lombard	6–4, 6–0
1947	(United Kingdom) Leslie Hunter Fulton	(United Kingdom) Mollie Welsh	6–0, 6–4
1948	(United Kingdom) Joy Gannon	(Poland) Mrs H Czolowska	6–2, 6–1
1949	(United Kingdom) Gem Hoahing	(United Kingdom) Joy Hibbert	4–6, 6–3, 6–2
1950	(United Kingdom) Wendy Stork	(United Kingdom) Helen Proudfoot	6–2, 6–3
1951	(United Kingdom) Helen Proudfoot	(United Kingdom) Heather Macfarlane	6–3, 3–6, 6–4
1952	(South Africa) Beryl Bartlett	(South Africa) Glenda Love	3–6, 6–2, 6–2
1953	(United Kingdom) Shirley Bloomer	(United Kingdom) Patricia Harrison	4–6, 6–2, 6–0
1954	(United Kingdom) Jean Petchell	(United Kingdom) Jean Knight	6–1, 6–2
1955	(United Kingdom) Elaine Watson	(United Kingdom) Rosemary Walsh	3–6, 6–2, 6–0
1956	(United Kingdom) Christine Truman	(United Kingdom) Valerie Lewis	7–5, 6–4
1957	(United Kingdom) Rita Bentley	(United Kingdom) Jill Rook	5–7, 6–2, 6–0
1958	(United Kingdom) E.A. Walker	(United Kingdom) Mollie Welsh Mackay	9–7, 7–5
1959	(United Kingdom) N.T. Seacy	(United Kingdom) A.V. Paterson	6–0, 8–6
1960	(Scotland) Joyce Barclay	(United Kingdom) Anne McAlpine	9–7, 1–6, 6–1
1961	(United Kingdom) Robin Blakelock	(Scotland) Frances MacLennan	divided the title
1962	(Scotland) Joyce Barclay (2)	(United Kingdom) NT Buchanan	6–3, 6–3
1963	(Scotland) Joyce Barclay (3)	(United Kingdom) D.McCallum	6–2, 6–2
1964	(Scotland) Joyce Williams (4)	(Scotland) Winnie Shaw	4–6, 6–4, 6–3
1965	(Scotland) Winnie Shaw	(Scotland) Joyce Williams	6–2, 6–0
1966	(Scotland) Winnie Shaw (2)	(Scotland) Joyce Williams	6–4, 2–6, 7–5
1967	(Australia) Judy Tegart	(United Kingdom) Ann Jones	6–4, 6–4
↓ Open era ↓
1968	(Scotland) Joyce Williams (5)	(Australia) Karen Krantzcke	8–6, 6–4
1969	(United Kingdom) Marjorie Love	(United Kingdom) Sheila Moodie	6–2, 6–2
1970	(Scotland) Winnie Shaw (3)	(Scotland) Joyce Williams	6–3, 6–8, 12–10
1971	(Scotland) Joyce Williams (6)	(Scotland) Winnie Shaw	6–4, 6–2
1972	(United Kingdom) Corinne Molesworth	(Scotland) Joyce Williams	divided the title
1973	(United Kingdom) Jill Cooper	(Scotland) Joyce Williams	6–4, 1–6, 6–3
1974	(United Kingdom) Marjorie Love	(Australia) Patricia Coleman	3–6, 6–1, 6–0
1975	(Scotland) Joyce Barclay Hume (7)	(United Kingdom) Lindsay Blachford	6–2, 6–4
1976	(Romania) Mariana Simionescu	(Czechoslovakia) J. Sedlackova	6–2, 6–3
1977	(Czechoslovakia) Martina Navratilova	(United States) Kristien Shaw	2–6, 9–8, 7–5
1978	(United States) Carrie Meyer	(Australia) D. Colligs	6–3, 8–9, 6–3
1979	(United States) Lea Antonoplis	(United Kingdom) Joyce Barclay Hume	7–6, 6–4
1980	(United States) Lea Antonoplis (2)	(United States) Carolina Maso	6–2, 6–2
1981	(Scotland) Judy Erskine	(United Kingdom) J. Denholm	6–7, 6–1, 6–3
1982	(United Kingdom) Cathy Drury	(United Kingdom) Denise Parnell	6–2, 6–2
1983	(United Kingdom) Cathy Drury (2)	(Australia) L. Fitzgerald	6–0, 6–0
1984	(United States) Lea Antonoplis (3)	(United States) Ann Henricksson	?
1985	(United States) Lea Antonoplis (4)	(Australia) Elizabeth Minter	6–3, 6–0
1986	(United Kingdom) Jackie Holden	(United Kingdom) Cath Berry	?
1987	(United States) Lisa Bonder	(Argentina) Gabriela Sabatini	divided the title
1988	(United States) Gigi Fernández	(Australia) Wendy Turnbull	6–2, 6–2
1989	(United States) Mary Joe Fernández	(United Kingdom) Anne Simpkin	6–1, 6–3
1990	(West Germany) Barbara Rittner	(Netherlands) Brenda Schultz	?
1991	(United Kingdom) Michelle Mair	(United Kingdom) Suzie Mair	?
1992	(United Kingdom) Caroline Billingham	(United Kingdom) K. Ross	divided the title
1993	(United States) Samantha Smith	(United Kingdom) Anne Simpkin	6–1, 6–3
1994	(United Kingdom) Heather Lockhart	(United Kingdom) Alison Reid	6–0, 4–6, 6–4

== See also ==
- Tennis in Scotland

== Sources ==
- Ayre's Lawn Tennis Almanack and Tournament Guide, A. Wallis Myers
- Dunlop Lawn Tennis Almanack and Tournament Guide, G.P. Hughes, 1939 to 1958, published by Dunlop Sports Co. Ltd, UK
- Lowe's Lawn Tennis Annuals and Compendia, Lowe, Sir F. Gordon, Eyre & Spottiswoode
- Myers. Arthur Wallis. (1903), Lawn Tennis at Home Abroad, Charles Scribner and Sons. New York. USA.
