= North Wales Championships =

Tennis tournament (1881–1939)

Defunct tennis tournament
- Event name: North Wales Counties Challenge Cup (1883); North Wales Challenge Cup (1884-86); North Wales Championships (1891-1939)
- Founded: 1881
- Abolished: 1939
- Location: Criccieth; Denbigh; Trefriw
- Surface: Grass / outdoor

The North Wales Championships were originally founded as the Vale of Clwyd CLTC Open Tournament in 1881. In 1883 that tournament became known as the North Wales Counties Challenge Cup until 1884 when it was renamed as the North Wales Challenge Cup until 1886. This first edition of the event lapsed, but was then revived by the Criccieth LTC at Criccieth in 1891 under its new name until 1939 when it was discontinued.

== History ==
In September 1881 the Vale of Clwyd CLTC (f.1881), at Ruthin, Vale of Clwyd, North Wales organised the Vale of Clwyd CLTC Open Tournament. In 1883 at what was then, the third edition of the event, the club inaugurated the North Wales Counties Challenge Cup for men at Denbigh.

In 1884 the tournament was renamed as the North Wales Challenge Cup. It continued to be staged until 1886. In 1891 the Criccieth Lawn Tennis Club (formally established in 1892) at Criccieth revived the North Wales Challenge Cup as the North Wales Championships, that ran until 1939.

== Finals ==
Incomplete Roll

=== Men's Singles ===
Year	Winner	Runner-up	Score
Vale of Clwyd CLTC Open Tournament
1881	(England) Percy John Frederick Lush	(United Kingdom) M. Lush	5–2, 5–4
1882	(England) Arthur Bennett Mesham	(Wales) H. Lloyd Williams	3–6, 6–2, 6–4
North Wales Counties Challenge Cup
1883	(England) Arthur Bennett Mesham (2)	(United Kingdom) Major Mesham	6-0, 6-3
North Wales Challenge Cup
1884	(Wales) G. Egerton	(England) Arthur Bennett Mesham	w.o.
1885	(Wales) G. Egerton (2)	(United Kingdom) Captain H.T. Ravenhill	6–4, 6–4
1886	(Wales) G. Egerton (3)	(Wales) J. E. Morris	3–6, 6–3, 6–5
1887	(England) Henry James Wilson Fosbery	(England) D.F. Pennant	6–4, 6–3, 6–3
1888	(England) George Whitely Hayes	(England) Henry James Wilson Fosbery	6–4, 6–3, 6–2
1891	(Ireland) Manliffe Goodbody	?	?
North Wales Championships
1892	(Ireland) Manliffe Goodbody (2)	?	?
1894	(England) Edward Carey	(Wales) Dylan Rhys Griffiths	7–5, 6–4, 6–4
1895	(England) Edward Carey (2)	(England) Arthur Carey	6–2, 3–6, 6–2, 6–4

=== Men's Doubles ===
Year	Winner	Runner-up	Score
Vale of Clwyd CLTC Open Tournament
1882	(England) Hugh Francis Birley (Wales) H. Lloyd Williams	(United Kingdom) Major Mesham (United Kingdom) W.P. Rigby	6-2, 6–1
North Wales Counties Challenge Cup
1883	(United Kingdom) J.P. Lewis (England) Arthur Bennett Mesham	(Wales) Mr. Morgan (Wales) Mr. Morgan	6–2, 6–4
North Wales Challenge Cup
1884	(England) Mr. Kersey (Wales) G. Egerton	(Wales) H. Lloyd Williams (Wales) R. Lloyd Williams	4–6, 6–2, 6–2
1885	(United Kingdom) Captain H.T. Ravenhill (United Kingdom) Mr. Hutton	(United Kingdom) A. Evill (United Kingdom) Mr. Kettlewell	6–5, 6–5
North Wales Championships

Incomplete Roll

=== Women's Singles ===
Year	Winner	Runner-up	Score
Vale of Clwyd CLTC Open Tournament
1881	(Wales) Miss L Williams	(England) Miss Proctor	5–3, 5–3
North Wales Championships
1892	(United Kingdom) Helen Jackson	(United Kingdom) Miss Moore	?
1895	(United Kingdom) Miss Turner	(United Kingdom) E. Moorhouse	w.o.
1896	(United Kingdom) Mary Pick	(United Kingdom) Mrs Coxon	6-3, 6-3
1897	(United Kingdom) Miss Makinson	(United Kingdom) Mary Pick	6-3, 6-3
1899	(United Kingdom) E. Makinson	(United Kingdom) N. Forster	6-3, 6-1
1900	(England) Ellen Evered	(United Kingdom) C. Maw	6-2, 6-1
1901	(England) Maude Garfit	(England) Ellen Evered	6-4, 6-2
1902	(England) Maude Garfit (2)	(England) Ellen Evered	6-2, 6-4
1903	(England) Maude Garfit (3)	(England) Mabel Hurlbatt Dudgeon	6-1, 3-6, 6-3
1904	(England) Maude Garfit (4)	(Wales) Miss Russell Davies	9-7, 6-3
1906	(United Kingdom) Mabel Hurlbatt Dudgeon	(United Kingdom) Hilda Hitchings	6-4, 6-4
1907	(United Kingdom) Mabel Hurlbatt Dudgeon (2)	(United Kingdom) Agnes Daniell Tuckey	6-2, 4-6, 6-1
1908	(United Kingdom) Mrs Walton	(United Kingdom) Mabel Hurlbatt Dudgeon	6-1, 2-6, 7-5
1909	(Wales) C.M. Jones	(United Kingdom) Mrs Macaulay	10-8, 8-6
1910	(United Kingdom) Mabel Hurlbatt Dudgeon (3)	(Wales) C. M. Jones	6-2, 6-2
1913	(Wales) A.M. Davies	(United Kingdom) C. Hollins	6-4, 6-3
1914/1918	Not held (due to World War I)		
1919	(United Kingdom) M. Platt	(United Kingdom) Miss Staffurth	6-3, 7-5
1920	(Argentina) Dorothy Boadle	(United Kingdom) Mrs E.H. Harris	6-0, 6-4
1921	(United Kingdom) Camilla Rimington	(United Kingdom) Edith Willock	6-1, 9-7
1922	(United Kingdom) Camilla Rimington (2)	(United Kingdom) Edith Willock	6-3, 6-3
1923	(United Kingdom) Camilla Rimington (3)	?	?
1924	(United Kingdom) Joan Reid-Thomas	(United Kingdom) Mrs Benham	6-1, 6-1
1925	(United Kingdom) Joan Reid-Thomas (2)	(United Kingdom) Evelyn Goldsworth	6-2, 8-6
1926	(United Kingdom) Joan Reid-Thomas Strawson (3)	(United Kingdom) Miss Lindsay	4-6, 6-1, 6-3
1927	(United Kingdom) K.M. Marriott	(United Kingdom) Thelma Cazalet	6-8, 7-5, 6-2
1928	(United Kingdom) Thelma Cazalet	(United Kingdom) Lesley Cadle	9-7, 6-3
1929	(United Kingdom) K.M. Marriott	(United Kingdom) Thelma Cazalet	6-3, 7-5
1930	(United Kingdom) C.F. Sutherland	(United Kingdom) P. Padmore	6-2, 6-3
1931	(United Kingdom) Dora Beazley	(United Kingdom) Eileen Connell Antrobus	4-6, 6-4, 7-5
1932	(United Kingdom) E.M. Gunson	(United Kingdom) Eileen Connell Antrobus	6-2, 1-6, 6-2
1933	(United Kingdom) Thelma Cazalet (2)	(United Kingdom) P. Hollins	w.o.
1934	(United Kingdom) Mildred Nonweiler Freeman	(United Kingdom) I. Robinson	6-4, 7-5
1935	(United Kingdom) Mildred Nonweiler Freeman (2)	(Wales) Patricia Owen	1-6, 6-2, 6-1
1936	(United Kingdom) Dora Beazley (2)	(United Kingdom) Manon Hargreaves	6-3, 7-5
1938	(United Kingdom) Dora Beazley (3)	(United Kingdom) Mrs E. Allen	6-1, 6-2
1939	(United Kingdom) Denise Huntbach	(United Kingdom) M. Watson	6-4, 6-3

=== Mix Doubles ===
Year	Winner	Runner-up	Score
Vale of Clwyd CLTC Open Tournament
1882	(United Kingdom) J.P. Lewis (Wales) Miss. Royds	(United Kingdom) Major Mesham (Wales) Mrs. Lloyd Williams	6–0, 6–3
North Wales Counties Challenge Cup
1883	(England) Arthur Bennett Mesham (England) Miss. Mainwaring	(Wales) Thomas Alured Wynne Edwards (Wales) Miss. Royds	6–3, 6–5
North Wales Challenge Cup
1884	(United Kingdom) Mr. A. MacBean (England) Miss. Mainwaring (2)	(England) Arthur Bennett Mesham (Wales) Mrs. Lloyd Williams	6-4, 6-4
1885	(United Kingdom) Captain H.T. Ravenhill (United Kingdom) Mrs. Ravenhill	(United Kingdom) P. Ormrod (Wales) Miss. Tuke	6-2, 6-1
North Wales Championships
