= John Boucher (tennis) =

English tennis player

- Full name: John Mycroft Boucher
- Country (sports): United Kingdom
- Born: 16 May 1870 Clifton, Bristol, Gloucestershire, England
- Died: 7 May 1948 (aged 77) Bristol, Gloucestershire, England
- Turned pro: 1896 (amateur)
- Retired: 1923
- Plays: Right-handed (one-handed backhand)

Singles
- Career titles: 26

Grand Slam singles results
- Wimbledon: 1R (1898)

John Mycroft Boucher born (16 May 1870 – 7 May 1948) was an English tennis player. In 1898 he was a semi-finalist at Irish Championships and competed at Wimbledon Championships, then considered two of the most important major tennis events. He was active from 1896 until 1923 and won 26 career singles titles.

== Career ==
John played his first tournament in 1896 at the Bristol and Clifton Open Lawn Tennis Championships featuring the West of England Championships in Bristol where he reached the quarter finals, but was beaten by the three time U.S. National Championships finalist William Larned.

His career singles highlights included winning the Welsh Championships five times (1903, 1906–1908, 1923), the Warwickshire Championships eight times (1897, 1900–1904, 1906–1907), the Trefriw Open six times (1897–1902), the Midland Counties Championships three times (1906–1908) and the Northumberland Championships two times (1907–1908.

In 1897 he won the Exmouth Open. In 1898 he reached the semi-finals of the Irish Lawn Tennis Championships in Dublin, but was beaten by Harold Mahony. In 1899 he took part in the Scottish Championships, but was defeated in the quarter finals by the American player Clarence Hobart. 1900 he won the Gloucestershire Championships. In 1923 played his final tournament at the Welsh Championships held at Newport, Wales which he won.

After John retired he later became a company director at his father's firm Ferris & Co. John Myscroft Boucher died on 7 May 1948 in Bristol, England.

== Philanthropy ==
In April 1932 he donated funds for the building of three hard tennis courts (shale), pavilions, practice grounds etc. to the Bristol Central Conservative Association; the club is known as the Bristol Central Tennis Club.

== Family ==
John was the son of John and Julia Boucher, his father was a pharmaceutical chemist and director of Ferris & Co. His younger sister was Edith Margaret Boucher (born 28 November 1878) was also a tennis player.
