= Crowton =

Village in Cheshire, England

Coordinates: 53.266°N 2.633°W

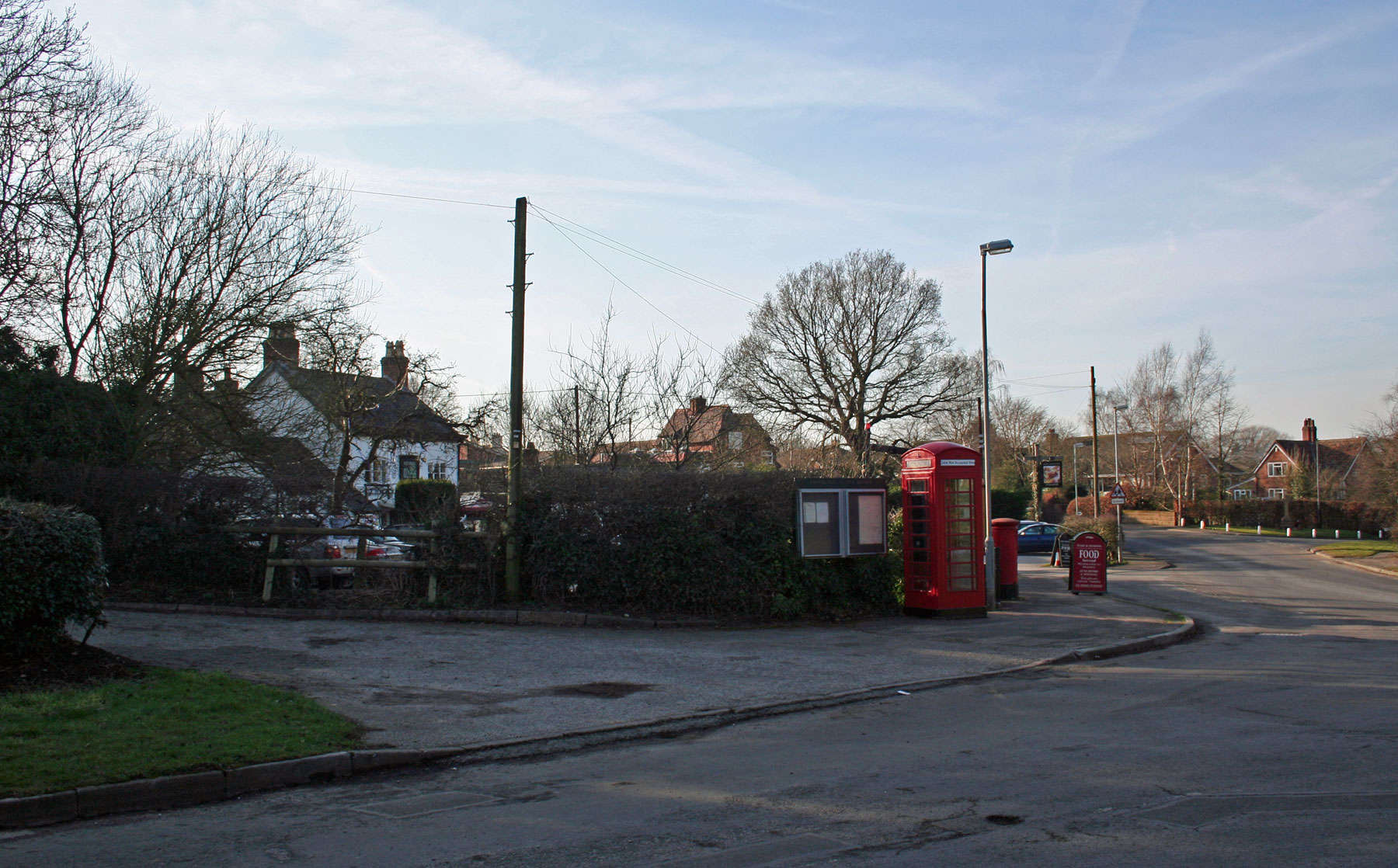
- Crowton village centre

- Location within Cheshire
- OS grid reference: SJ579745
- Civil parish: Crowton
- Unitary authority: Cheshire West and Chester
- Ceremonial county: Cheshire
- Region: North West
- Country: England
- Sovereign state: United Kingdom
- Post town: NORTHWICH
- Postcode district: CW8
- Dialling code: 01928
- Police: Cheshire
- Fire: Cheshire
- Ambulance: North West
- UK Parliament: Chester South and Eddisbury

Crowton is a civil parish and village within the unitary authority of Cheshire West and Chester and the ceremonial county of Cheshire, England. It is located approximately 6 miles west of Northwich. The civil parish includes the small settlement of Ruloe. The population of the civil parish as taken at the 2011 census was 465.

== See also ==
- Listed buildings in Crowton
- Christ Church, Crowton
