= Leicestershire County Lawn Tennis Championships =

Defunct tennis tournament
- Founded: 1900; 125 years ago
- Abolished: 1914; 111 years ago
- Location: Leicester, Leicestershire, England
- Venue: Ashby-de-la-Zouch Castle Lawn Tennis Club, (1900–04, 1909); Leicestershire Lawn Tennis Club, (1905–08, 1910–14)
- Surface: Grass

The Leicestershire County Lawn Tennis Championships or simply called the Leicestershire Championships was a combined men's and women's grass court tennis tournament founded in 1900 that ran until 1914 as an open international tennis event. In 1926 the event was reclassified as a closed tournament open only to Leicestershire residents and club players only.

== History ==
In 1878 the first Leicester Lawn Tennis Tournament was staged at Aylestone Park, Leicester and played on three courts. In 1881 that event became an open tournament that included women and was then known as the Leicester Open Lawn Tennis Tournament. By 1891 the tournament was being staged under the name of the Leicester Open Tennis Tournament In 1900 Leicestershire LTC launched a new county level tournament called the Leicestershire County Lawn Tennis Championships, that was played at Ashby-de-la-Zouch until 1904. However the Leicester LTC also continued to host an Leicester Open Tournament (1900–04, 1909) during the period the county championship event was staged at Ashby-de-la-Zouch.

In 1905 the Leicestershire County Lawn Tennis Championships returned to Leicester where the continued to be played until 1908. In 1909 for one year only it was held again at Ashby-de-la-Zouch. In 1910 through until 1913 it held in Leicester. Between 1915 and 1918 the open international championships were not held because of World War I, and were not resumed. In 1926 Leicestershire Lawn Tennis Club established a closed tournament called the Leicestershire Closed County Championships that is still operating today. From 1939 until 1945 that tournament was not held as a result of World War II.

== Venues ==
=== Ashby-de-la-Zouch ===
The Leicestershire Championships were for certain periods staged at the Ashby-de-la-Zouch Castle Lawn Tennis Club. This particular club also staged an early and successful tennis event called the Ashby-de-la-Zouch Open Tournament (f.1900), In 1910 the open tournament was renamed as the Ashby-de-la-Zouch Championship. By 1939 the event was known as the Ashby-de-la-Zouch Open Championships.

=== Leicester ===
In the Summer of 1878 as The Leicester Lawn Tennis and Quoit Club one of the 12 oldest tennis clubs in the world was founded. Generally known as Leicester Lawn Tennis Club until 1912. In 1929 the club was incorporated as The Leicestershire Lawn Tennis Club. The first known grounds were on land rented from Leicester Corporation for £30 per year, 6068 square yards on the south side of Park Road (now Victoria Park Road) near the London Road in 1885. It then consisted of six grass courts, and a cinder court. In 1900 this ground had to be vacated due to road development and the current ground was leased from JW Goddard, the main entrance then was from Toller Road in Leicester.

== Event names ==
- Leicestershire County Lawn Tennis Championships (Open) (1900–1914)
- Leicestershire Closed County Lawn Tennis Championships (1926–1967)
- Leicestershire Tennis Championships (Closed) (1967–1979)
- Leicestershire County Championships (Closed) (1980–current)

== Other tournaments ==
- Leicester Lawn Tennis Tournament (1878–1879)
- Leicester Open Lawn Tennis Tournament (1880–1890)
- Leicester Open (1891–1939)

== Notes ==
Closed tournament: Entries to “closed” tournaments are restricted, normally by a requirement of residency within a specified geographic area.
