= Cinque Ports Championships =

Defunct tennis tournament
- Tour: ILTF Circuit
- Founded: 1902; 124 years ago
- Abolished: 1954; 72 years ago
- Location: Folkestone, Kent, England
- Venue: Folkestone Lawn Tennis Club
- Surface: Grass

The Cinque Ports Championships was a men's and women's grass court tennis tournament founded in 1902. The event was staged annually at Folkestone Lawn Tennis Club, Folkestone, Kent, England until 1954.

== History ==
In 1895 the original Folkestone Lawn Tennis Club was formed. In 1902 the club established the Cinque Ports Championships. The Cinque Ports is an historical grouping of towns located in Kent and Sussex. The tournament was played annually through till 1954 when it was discontinued.

== Venue ==
The original club had 14 grass tennis courts and situated on land between Bouverie Road and Shorncliffe Road. In 1914 and 1920 it also hosted Davis Cup matches.
