= Maude Garfit =

English tennis player

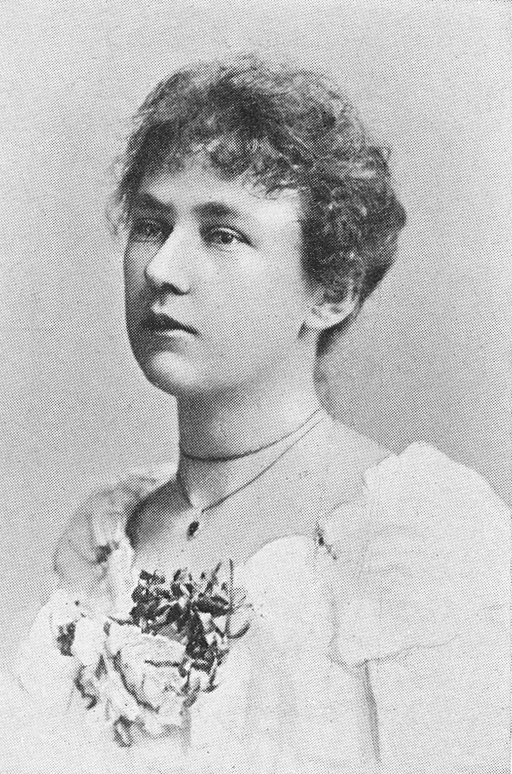
- Garfit, ca. 1903
- Full name: Helen Maude Garfit
- Country (sports): United Kingdom
- Born: 15 February 1874; Ruloe, Cheshire, England
- Died: 23 August 1948 (Age 74); Bonchester Bridge, Roxburghshire, Scotland

Singles
- Career titles: 26

Grand Slam singles results
- Wimbledon: SF (1909)

Helen Maude "Maudie" Garfit (15 February 1874 – 23 August 1948) was an English tennis player active in the late 19th century and early 20th century. She was a semi finalist at the 1909 Wimbledon Championships, and winner of the prestigious Irish Championships three times (1907–1909), and a two time finalist at the Northern Championships (1909–1910). She was active between 1898 and 1910 and won 26 career singles titles.

== Career ==
Garfitt first learned to play tennis at the age of 14 on the court at her home. She joined the Rock Ferry Lawn Tennis Club, Rock Ferry, Cheshire whilst at school around 1891 at the age of 17 to improve her tennis. In 1898 at the age of 24 she played her first tournament at the Midland Counties Championships at Edgbaston where she reached the final before losing to four time Wimbledon champion Blanche Bingley Hillyard.

In 1899, Garfit played at the Wimbledon Championships for the first time, but lost her first match against Muriel Robb in three sets. In 1901 she reached the final of the Midland Counties Championships for the second time, but lost to Ruth Durlacher in straight sets.

In the spring of 1903, she reached the final of the prestigious Irish Championships at Dublin, but lost to Louisa Martin. Four years later in 1907, she won the Irish Championships by beating Hilda Lane 6–2, 6–2 in the final. She successfully defended that title twice in 1908 and 1909. In August 1903 she won the Championship of North Wales held in Trefriw, and again in 1904. The same year she won her first Shropshire Championships at Shrewsbury, and then went on to win that event five more times in (1905, 1907-10).

In 1904 she reached the finals of the Welsh Championships before losing to Connie Wilson, she reached the final again in 1906 before losing to the American player May Sutton. In August 1907 she won the Derbyshire Championships held at Buxton defeating Constance Meyer. The following year she failed to defend that title losing to Charlotte Cooper Sterry, however she won the title again in 1909 and 1910.

In 1908 she won the singles title at the Welsh Championships in Newport and successfully defended it in 1909. she also won the Scottish Championships singles title twice 1908 to 1909.

In 1909, Garfit played at Wimbledon again and this time advanced to the semifinals in singles before losing to eventual champion Dora Boothby. At the (unofficial) mixed doubles competition, she won the title partnering Xenophon Kasdaglis. In June 1909 she reached the final of the Northern Championships held in Manchester, before losing to Edith Johnson. In 1910, Maude played her last season of lawn tennis. In June she reached the final of the singles event at the Northern Championships for the second time that was held in Liverpool, but lost a three-set match again to Edith Johnson.

In addition Maude also won singles titles at the ladies challenge cup at the Conishead Priory tournament six times from (1901–1906), and the Cumberland Ladies Challenge Cup at Carlisle three times from (1906–1908).

== Personal ==
Helen Maude Garfit was born on 15 February 1874 at Ruloe, Cheshire, England. She was the third and last child of Charles Taylor Garfit (b. 1844), and Ada-Maria Garfit (née Corringham; b. 1843). She died 23 August 1948 at Bonchester Bridge, Roxburghshire, Scotland at the age of 74.
