= Kent Coast Championships =

Defunct tennis tournament
- Tour: ILTF Circuit
- Founded: 1903; 122 years ago
- Abolished: 1956; 69 years ago
- Location: Hythe, Kent, England
- Venue: Hotel Imperial Courts
- Surface: Grass

The Kent Coast Championships or Kent Coast Open Tennis Championships or Kent Coast Open Lawn Tennis Championship was a men's and women's grass court tennis tournament first established in 1903. It was first held at the Hotel Imperial tennis courts, Hythe, Kent, England. The tournament was staged annually as part of the ILTF Circuit until 1956.

== History ==
In 1903, the Kent Coast Championships were established at the Imperial Hotel, Hythe, Kent, England. The winners of the first edition in the men's singles was Henry Norman Marrett, and in the women's singles Mildred Coles. The championships ran annually with the exception of two temporary stoppages due to both the first and second world wars. The final winner of the men's singles was Gerry Oakley, and the women's singles title was shared between Shirley Bloomer and Barbara Knapp.
