= Platform tennis =

Paddle sport

Platform tennis is derived from tennis, developed in 1928 at Fox Meadow Tennis Club in Scarsdale, New York, by James Cogswell and Fessenden Blanchard.

== Development ==
Cogswell and Blanchard had been seeking to develop a sport that could be played outdoors during the winter. The original platform they constructed was 48 feet (15 m) long and 20 feet (6.1 m) wide, dimensions that were dictated by the Cogswell property's steep slope and constrained by the presence of a large rock. The court was too small for volleyball and the overhanging foliage precluded badminton, two alternatives that Cogswell and Blanchard had considered, leaving a form of deck tennis as the only option that they deemed viable. Cogswell found paddle tennis equipment in a sporting goods store and started using it on their court after lowering the net that they had used to play deck tennis. As the balls they used tended to go out of play, fencing was added, rising from an initial height of 8 feet (2.4 m) up to 12 feet (3.7 m) as of 1932. The dimensions of 39 feet (12 m) by 18 feet (5.5 m) were expanded to the 44 feet (13 m) by 20 feet (6.1 m) size of a badminton court. As this left a narrow strip out of play between the court and the fencing, the fences were put into play and players were allowed to hit the ball after it hit off of the fence. The court dimensions expanded to their final size in 1932, making it equivalent to one-quarter the size of a standard tennis court. In 1935, Scarsdale's Fox Meadow Club hosted the first national championship.

== Rules ==
=== Court ===
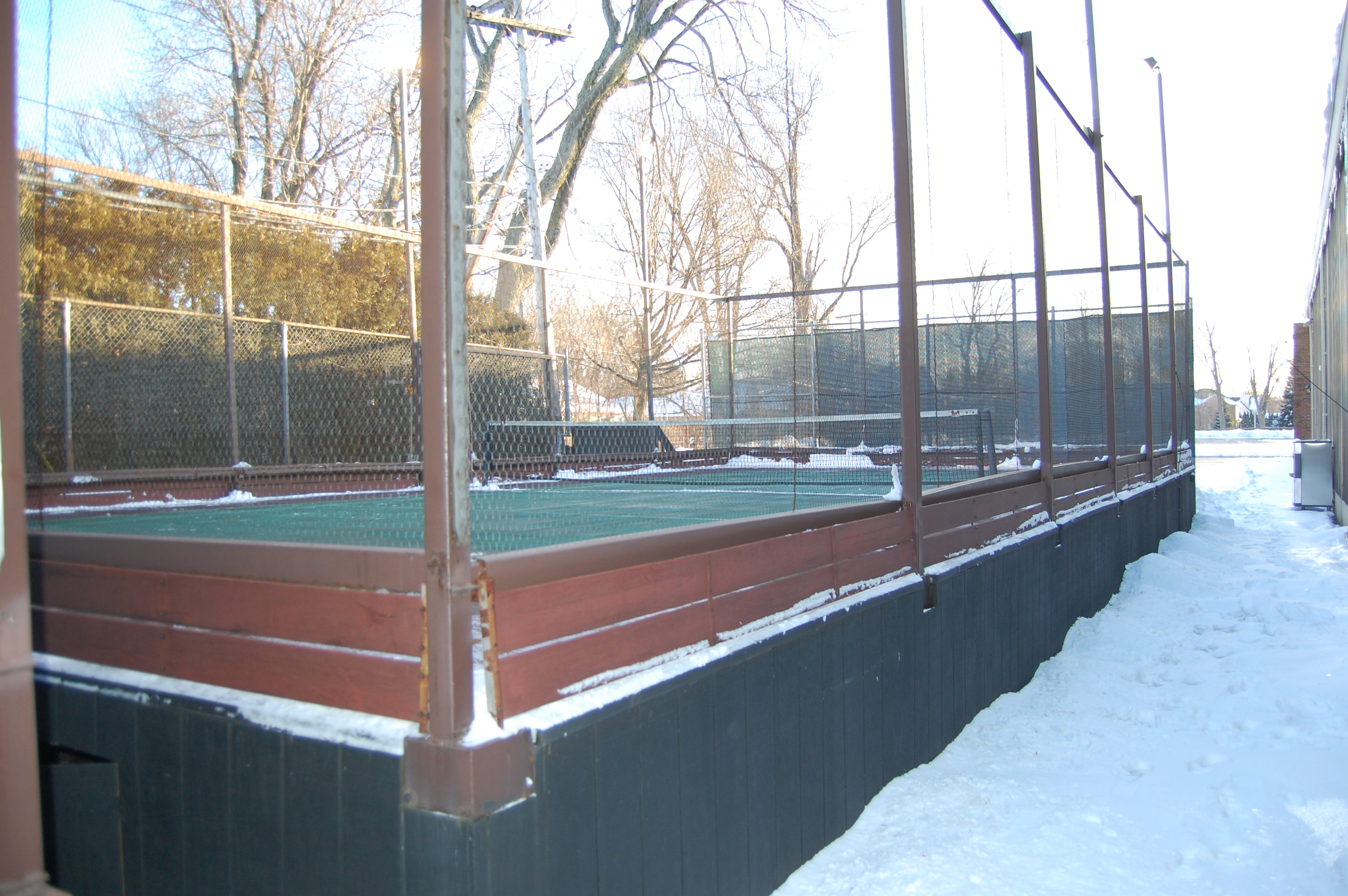
A platform tennis court

The court is one-quarter the size of a traditional tennis court and is surrounded by a chicken wire fence 12 feet (3.7 m) high. The taut fencing allows balls to be played off the wall and remain in play. Originally developed on land unsuitable for traditional tennis courts, such as along hills, the space under the platform allows for the installation of heating equipment that, together with lighting, can allow for year-long play around the clock, even in cold weather. Courts in warm-weather locations are more likely to be constructed on level ground, as the need for clearing snow and ice is obviated. The deck is 60 feet (18 m) long by 30 feet (9.1 m) in width. The court measures 44 feet (13 m) in length by 20 feet (6.1 m) in width and is divided by a net that is kept taut at a height of 34 inches (860 mm) at its center and 37 inches (940 mm) at either end.

=== Ball and paddle ===
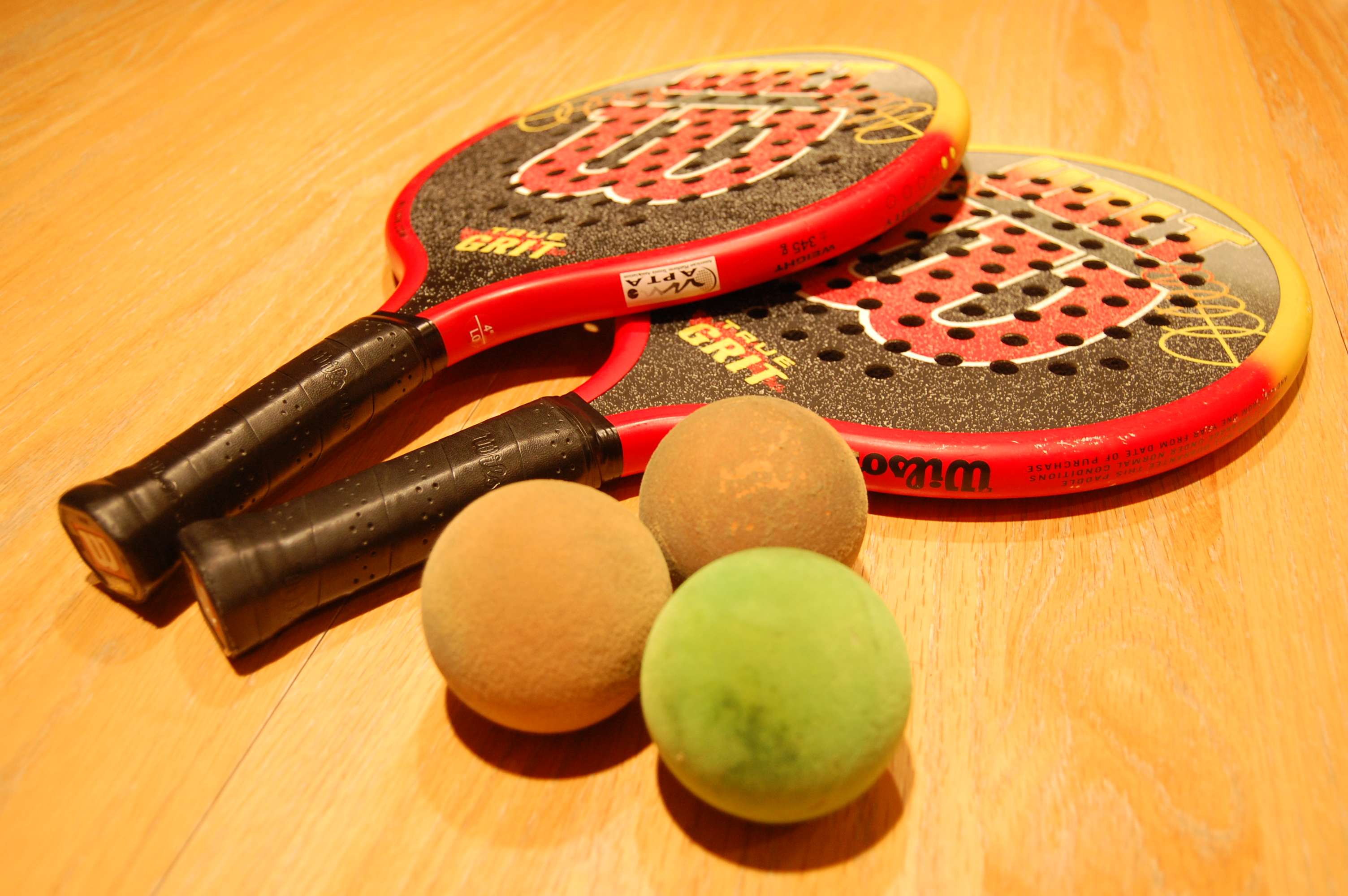
Paddles and balls used in platform tennis

A spongy ball measuring 2.5 inches (64 mm) in diameter is used. The ball can be served overhand. The ball is struck with a paddle that extends 18 inches (460 mm) and which may have up to 87 holes measuring no more than 3/8 inch (9.5 mm) in diameter to improve its aerodynamics.

=== Service ===
A serve is the first shot to begin a point. The serve is initiated by tossing the ball into the air and hitting it into the diagonally opposite service box. The ball may make contact with the net: if it lands in the service box, it is a valid serve. There are no "lets" in platform tennis.

The rules governing the serve are different for singles and doubles play. In a game of singles, similar rules of tennis apply, i.e. the server may make two attempts at a valid serve. Only after a second failed attempt (a "fault") is the point lost. In a game of doubles, the server is given a single chance for a valid serve. For this reason, serves are often much less aggressive in a doubles game.

=== Scoring ===
Platform tennis uses the same scoring rules of tennis for game, set and match. See: Tennis scoring system

== Similar sports ==
- Paddle tennis (or POP Tennis) is a game adapted from tennis that is played on a court smaller than a traditional tennis court with a lower net and no doubles lanes. Like platform tennis, paddle tennis is played with a solid paddle. Paddle tennis uses a depressurized tennis ball and an underhand serve. The same court is used for both singles and doubles, with doubles being the dominant form of play.
- Padel is typically played in doubles on an enclosed court about half the size of a tennis court. It is popular in Europe and Hispanic America. It was invented in 1969 in Acapulco, Mexico by Enrique Corcuera.
- Pickelball is played on a similarly sized court with paddles and plastic ball with holes. It has gained enormous popularity in the United States since 2020.
