= George Kerr (tennis) =

Scottish tennis player and physician

- Country (sports): SCO
- Born: 22 April 1860 Edinburgh Scotland
- Died: Unknown Scotland
- Turned pro: 1883 (amateur tour)
- Retired: 1894

Singles
- Career record: 29–37

Grand Slam singles results
- Wimbledon: 1R (1885)

Dr George Kerr born (22 April 1860 - ) was a Scottish tennis player and physician. He competed at the 1885 Wimbledon Championships. He was a three time quarter finalist in the men's singles at the Scottish National Championships in 1886, 1888 and 1893. He was a founding member of the Dyvours Lawn Tennis Club and later Scottish Lawn Tennis Association. He was active from 1883 to 1894 contested 2 career finals.

== Career ==
George Kerr was born in Scotland on 22 April 1860 and educated at Edinburgh University. He was a member of the Edinburgh Dyvours Lawn Tennis Club and later Scottish Lawn Tennis Association. He played his first singles tournament at the South of Scotland Championships at Moffat in 1883. In major tournaments he took part in the men's singles at the 1885 Wimbledon Championships where he was defeated in the first round by Ireland's Ernest Browne. He also played at the Northern Championships in 1887.

He was active from 1883 to 1894 and was a three time quarter finalist in the men's singles at the Scottish National Championships in 1886, 1888 and 1893. He contested only two career finals at the Fifeshire Championships in 1885 where he lost John Galbraith Horn, and the Galashiels Open in 1887 where he lost to England's Arthur Story in five sets. He was also a semi finalist at the East of Scotland Championships and West of Scotland Championships both in 1887. Kerr played his final known singles tournament in 1894 at the Whitehouse Open in Edinburgh.
