= Tennis in Scotland =

Tennis in Scotland was introduced from France in the Middle Ages. During the 20th century it was a minor sport, but has obtained some prominence due to the successes of Andy Murray and other Scots. While tennis courts are not uncommon, the country's oceanic climate has made it historically quite hard for Scottish players to develop. The only tennis inductee into the Scottish Sports Hall of Fame is Winnie Shaw. However, since 2008, Tennis Scotland's membership has increased from 32,715 to 47,657 - a rise of more than 45 per cent.

Unlike badminton, squash and table tennis, Scotland competes as part of Great Britain in tennis; however, its contribution to the pool of British players traditionally has been very poor in the modern era with almost all notable players being English. However, this has taken an abrupt turn in recent years with emergence of Andy Murray, and doubles players Colin Fleming and Jamie Murray. Andy Murray is by some distance the best player currently representing Britain as the UK number 1 and is also the world number 1. On 7 July 2013 he became the first British player to win the men's singles at Wimbledon since Fred Perry in 1936, 77 years before. Brother Jamie and won the Wimbledon mixed doubles title along with Serbian Jelena Janković in 2007, the first time any British player had won a major title at Wimbledon in 20 years. Colin Fleming along with his English partner Ross Hutchins is currently ranked 9th in the ATP Doubles Team Rankings. There are no official ATP/WTA tournaments in Scotland however, with all major events in the UK being held in England.

== Governing body ==
The governing body is Tennis Scotland founded as the Scottish Lawn Tennis Association in 1895, which is based in Airthrey Castle, Stirling.

== History ==
=== Medieval history ===
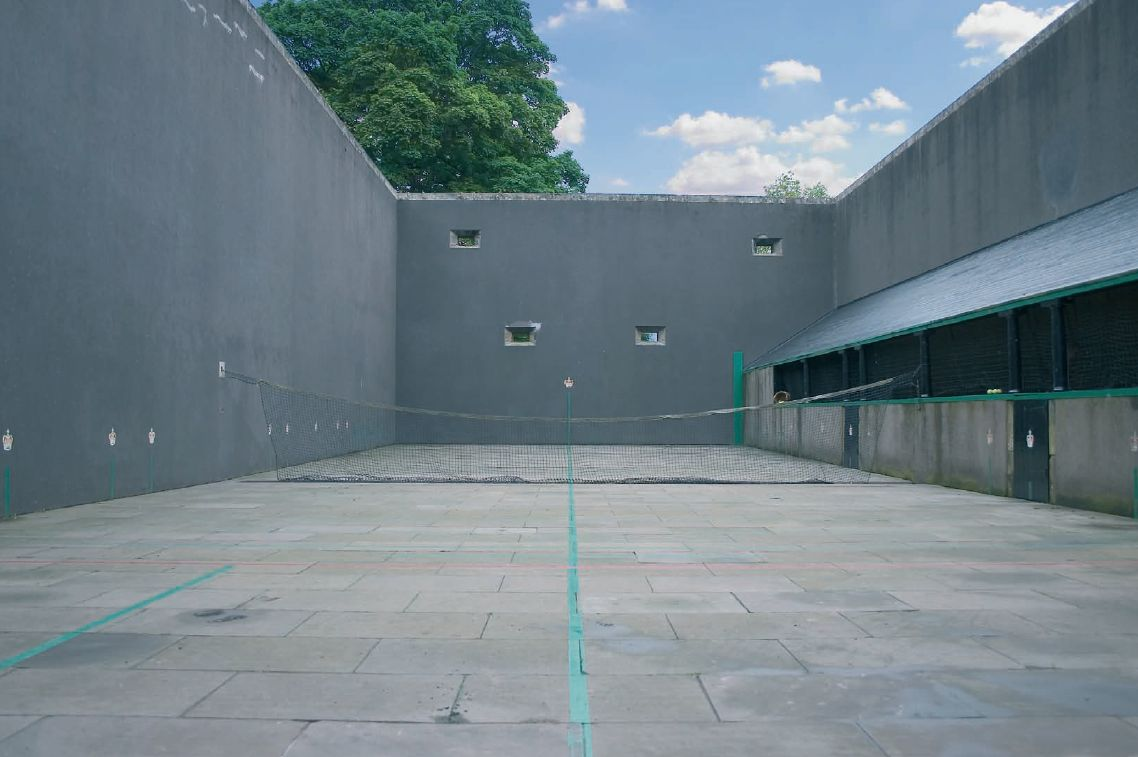
The Falkland Palace Royal Tennis Club in 2005

Tennis in its earlier forms was introduced into Scotland from France in the Middle Ages. It was traditionally known as "caitch" or "cache" in Scotland, and is an ancestor of the better known form of tennis. James IV of Scotland played tennis with the Spanish ambassador Pedro de Ayala at Stirling Castle on 10 April 1498. The Falkland Palace Royal Tennis Club is claimed to be the oldest tennis court in the world.

=== 19th century ===
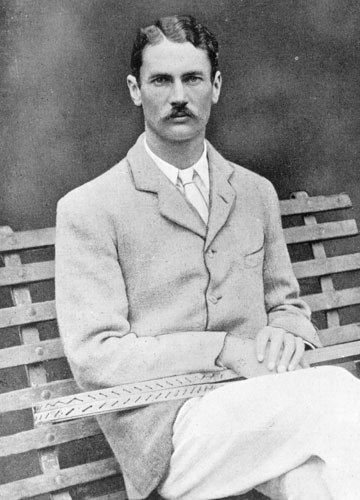
Scottish-born tennis player Harold Mahony

In the nineteenth century, tennis was a fairly exclusive sport, with high level participation being mainly by the upper classes.

Scotland produced two Wimbledon men's champions in this period, Herbert Lawford and Harold Mahony. However, to complicate matters, Lawford was born in England but died in Scotland, and Mahony was Scottish born, but died in County Kerry, where his family were from.

Herbert Lawford (15 May 1851 – 20 April 1925) was once co-World No. 1 tennis player and won the Men's Singles championship at Wimbledon in 1887, and was runner-up five times.

Harold Mahony is best known for winning the Wimbledon Championships in 1896. He was born at 21 Charlotte Square, Edinburgh to Richard John Mahony, an Irish barrister and prominent landowner. The family had a home in Scotland but spent most of their time at Dromore Castle, in County Kerry, Ireland. Harold trained on a specially built tennis court at Dromore. Mahony was also a successful Olympian. At the 1900 Summer Olympics in Paris (France) he won a silver medal in the men's singles event and a bronze medal in the doubles tournament (for Great Britain and Ireland). Mahoney won the Kent Championships in 1899, defeating Wilberforce Eaves in the final, and in 1904, defeating Brame Hillyard in the final.

The Scottish sporting all-rounder Leslie Balfour-Melville also played tennis, but this is not as significant as his golf, cricket and rugby credentials.

Patrick Bowes-Lyon, a relative of the Queen Mother was Scottish tennis champion in 1885, 1886 and 1888, he won the doubles at Wimbledon alongside Herbert Wilberforce.

=== 20th century ===
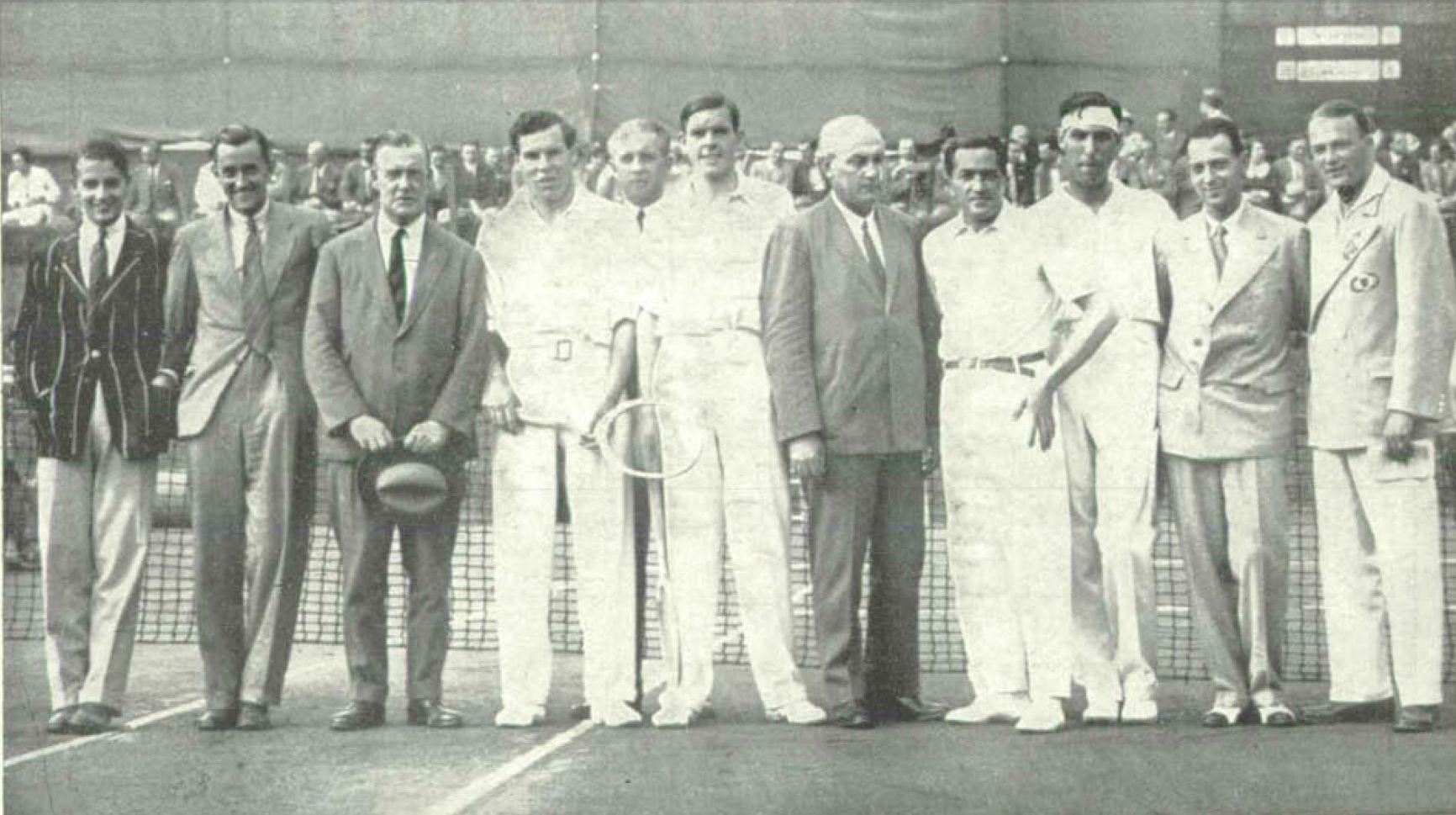
Scottish tennis player Ian Collins (sixth from left) in 1929

In the 20th century, particularly the latter half, tennis became less socially stratified. However, even in the 1970s, the quality of Scottish tennis was seen as low, even featuring in a Monty Python sketch as being "well known as the worst tennis-playing nation on Earth". In this sketch, extraterrestrials turn people into Scotsmen in order to win Wimbledon:

"So these blancmanges, blancmange-shaped creatures come from the planet Skyron in the Galaxy of Andromeda. They order 48,000,000 kilts from a Scottish menswear shop ... turn the population of England into Scotsmen (well known as the worst tennis-playing nation on Earth) thus leaving England empty during Wimbledon fortnight! Empty during Wimbledon fortnight ... what's more the papers are full of reports of blancmanges appearing on tennis courts up and down the country - practising. This can only mean one thing! They mean to win Wimbledon!"

Ian Collins (1903 – 1975) In 1927 he made his Wimbledon debut, the first of 12 Wimbledon Championships that he entered. He missed the Championship in 1933 after injuring himself riding, but appeared in the event every other time until 1939. His Davis Cup partnership with Colin Gregory proved successful as they were undefeated in their six matches together, in 1929 and 1930. They also combined in major tournaments and made the finals of both the Australian Championship and Wimbledon in 1929. Collins and Gregory lost to Jack Crawford and Harry Hopman in the Australian final 6–1, 6–8, 4–6, 6–1, 6–3, but beat them in the 1930 Davis Cup. They narrowly lost the Wimbledon final in another five setter, to Wilmer Allison and John Van Ryn, 6–4, 5–7, 6–3, 10–12, 6–4. Collins was also a mixed doubles finalist in the 1929 Wimbledon Championship and again in 1931. As a singles player, Collins had his best showing in 1930 when he reached the fourth round, before being eliminated by Bunny Austin. The following year he had the best win of his career when he defeated number one seed Henri Cochet in the second round of the 1931 Wimbledon Championship, 6–2, 8–6, 0–6, 6–3.

Winnie Shaw (1947–1992) was the French Open finalist in both Mixed Doubles and Women's Doubles; Australian Open semi-finalist in Singles; Wimbledon semi-finalist in Women's Doubles, and quarter-finalist in Singles.

George Kelly took up tennis after his retirement from association football. Kelly started playing Tennis with Johnny King and the pair almost made the 1970 Wimbledon Championships. Robin Welsh (1869 –1934) is another example of a Scottish tennis player better known for another sport, in this case curling.

With partner John Paish, John Clifton was a doubles runner-up at Newport, Wales in 1971. Clifton also made the second round of the singles at the 1971 Wimbledon Championships and the third round of the men's doubles at the 1973 Wimbledon Championships (with Stanley Matthews).

=== 21st century ===
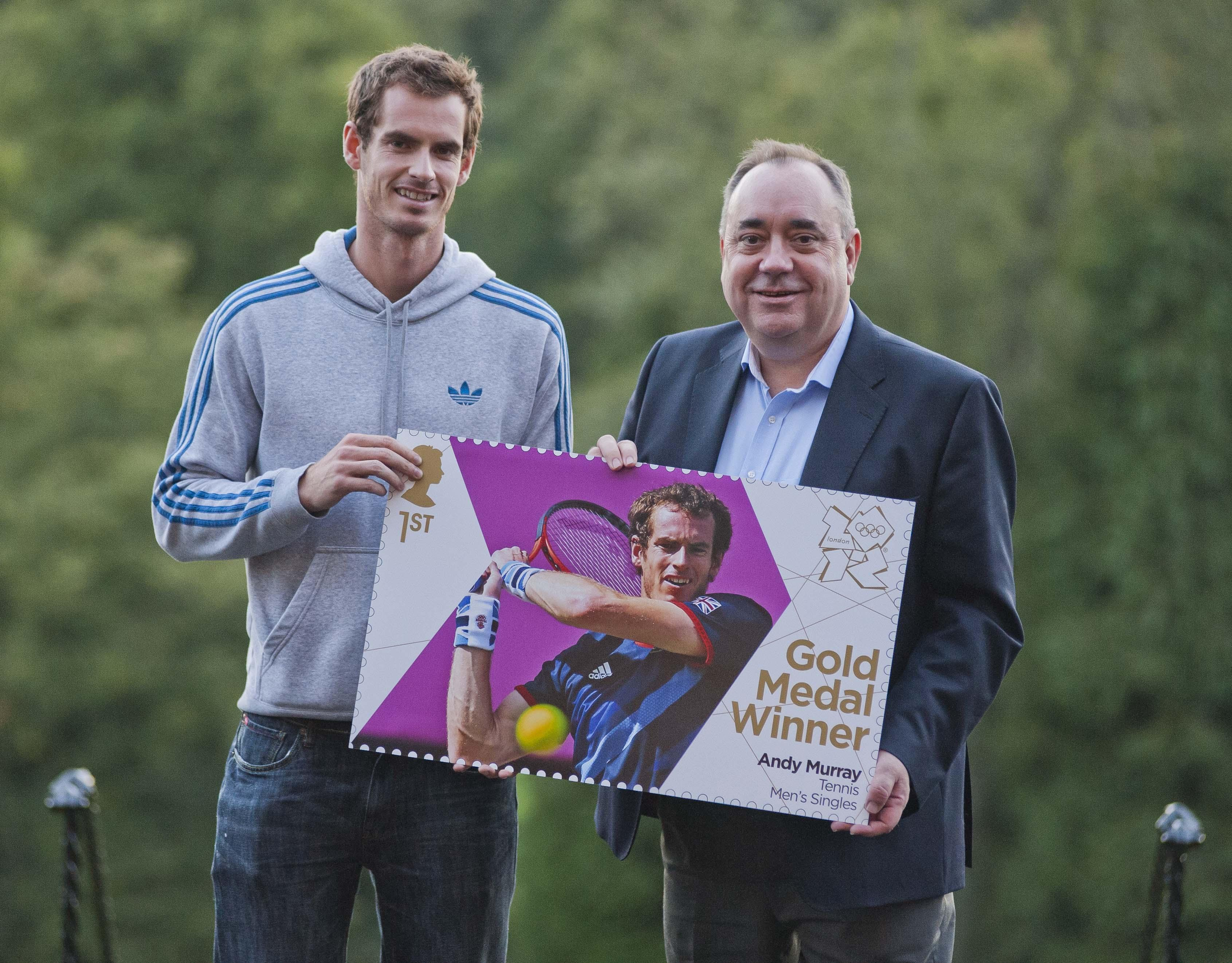
First Minister Alex Salmond (right) presents Andy Murray (left) with his commemorative stamp in 2012

By the 21st century, Scottish tennis was greatly advanced, thanks partly to the efforts of Judy Murray in training up her sons Andy and Jamie Murray to international standard. However, it is notable that neither of the Murray brothers came up through the Scottish tennis system, nor indeed the British tennis system, and trained abroad in Spain and the USA.

Ukrainian-born Elena Baltacha, moved to Scotland as a small child, and is a four-time winner of the Aegon Award, she was also a long-term British number 1, a position she held intermittently from 2002 to 2012. However, due to her absence from competition, due to knee surgery, as of 17 June 2013 she holds a current world ranking of number 185 and domestic ranking of British number 4. Her career high ranking of world number 49 was achieved on 13 September 2010.

In September 2016 the 2016 Davis Cup World Group semifinal was held at the Commonwealth Arena in Glasgow, the Great Britain Davis Cup team losing 2–3 to Argentina.

=== Era of success (2010s) ===
==== Singles success ====
As of 2022, Andy has won three Grand Slam singles titles (Wimbledon in 2013 and 2016 and US Open in 2012) and is the only player to win two Olympic Gold medals (2012 and 2016).

After he beat Novak Djokovic to win his first ATP World Tour Finals title in 2012, Andy displaced Djokovic to become number one in the ATP world rankings.

==== Doubles success ====
His brother Jamie has won seven Grand Slam titles (two men's doubles and five mixed doubles). His honours list includes the 2016 Australian and 2016 US Open doubles titles and the 2007 and 2017 Wimbledon and 2017, 2018 and 2019 US Open mixed doubles titles.

==== Davis Cup success ====
Great Britain won the Davis Cup in 2015, the nations first success in 79 years since the 1936 tournament. During the competition, Andy won 11 of his 12 rubbers, which included three doubles wins with Jamie).

==== Wheelchair tennis ====
Gordon Reid has been hugely successful as a wheelchair tennis player. In 2016, Reid win the Australian Open, Wimbledon, and Paralympic Games singles titles. In addition, he has won 19 Grand Slams in men's wheelchair doubles and three other Paralympic medals.

== Clubs ==
There are currently 251 tennis clubs in Scotland.

List of tennis clubs in Scotland by region:

- Aberdeenshire (6)
- Angus (3)
- Argyll (2)
- Ayrshire (11)
- Dumfriesshire (2)
- Dunbartonshire (3)
- East Lothian (1)*
- Fife (7)
- Inverness-shire (1)
- Lanarkshire (7)
- Midlothian (15)
- Moray (2)
- Peeblesshire (1)
- Perthshire (5)
- Renfrewshire (4)
- Ross-shire (1)
- Stirlingshire (3)
- West Lothian (2)

== Current Tournaments ==
The Tennis Scotland (TS Open Tour 2022) leaderboard was introduced in 2018, allowing players to accumulate ranking points and climb the tables whilst competing at events on the circuit throughout the year. In addition to the frontrunners being crowned leaderboard champions, individuals occupying the top 12 spots on the men's and women's rankings also earn the chance to compete at the TS Open Tour Masters event in December.

- Ayrshire Open
- British Tour Glasgow
- British Your Giffnock Open
- East Lothian Open
- Moir Construction Tayside Open
- North East Championships Indoors
- Scottish Clay Court Championships
- Scottish Indoor Championships
- Scottish National Championships
- St Andrew's University Open
- Stirling University Open
- South of Scotland Championships
- Tennis Championships of the Highlands
- The North East of Scotland Championships
- VMH Solicitors East of Scotland
- Waverley ROGY Open
- West Highland Championships
- West of Scotland Open Championships
- Whitecraigs Easter Tournament

== Former tennis tournaments ==
Notes: This is a list of former tennis tournaments held in Scotland Source:Tennis Archives

- Aberdeen Cup-Exhibition-(2005-2006)
- Ayrshire Championships-(1947-1966)
- Banffshire Championships, Banff-(1921-1958)
- Border Championships (also known as the Scottish Border Championships)-Galashiels-(1898-1964)
- Broughty Ferry Open (1883-1929).
- Carnoustie Open-(1913-1960)
- Castle Wemyss Open (1890-1905)
- Castle Wemyss Cup (1890-1905)
- Central District Open (1949-1954)
- Clyde Coast (1964)
- Craighelen (1963,1970)
- Dewar Cup Edinburgh-(1968-1972)
- Dewar Cup Perth-(1968-1969)
- Dirleton Castle LTC Tournament-Dirleton-(1880-1885)
- East Lothian Championships (1928-1964)
- East of Scotland Championships-St Andrews, Edinburgh-(1887-1989)
- Edinburgh Cup-(1971-1974)
- Edinburgh Hydropathic Tournament-(1905)
- Edinburgh International Exhibition Tournament-(1886)
- Edinburgh University LTC Open-(1886-1896)
- Four Courts Championship-(1947-1951)
- Galashiels Championship/Galashiels Open-(1884-1920)
- Glasgow Exhibition-(1954)
- Grantown-on-Spey-(1947-1964)
- Inverkip Rovers LTC Tournament (1882-1886)
- Inverkip Rovers Open-(1885-1889).
- Inverkip Rovers Closed Championships (1882-1888)
- Inverness-(1951)
- Lanarkshire Championships (1886-1999)
- Liberton-(1904-1906)
- Melrose-(1887)
- Montrose-(1947-1956)
- Newton Stewart-(1957)
- North Angus Championships-(1957-1964)
- North Berwick-(1905)
- North of Forth Championships-(1919-1960)
- North of Scotland Championships-(1889-1989)
- North East of Scotland Championships-(1953-1957)
- Pitlochry Open-(1905-1938)
- Pollokshields Open-(1886-1897)
- Renfrewshire Championships-Paisley-(1947-1954)
- Scottish Championships-(1877-1994)
- Scottish Central Championships (1912-1954)
- Rothesay Lawn Tennis Tournament-(1885-1887)
- Scottish Central District Open Championships (1949-1968)
- Scottish Covered Courts Championships-(1962-1970)
- Scottish Covered Courts Tennis Championships (1971-84)
- Scottish Grass Courts-(1947-1960)
- Scottish Hard Court Championships-(1923-1994)
- Scottish Highland Championships-(1896-1981)
- Scottish Lowlands Championships-(1920-1949)
- Scottish Midlands Championships-(1947-1963)
- Scottish Northern Championships-Elgin-(1892-1962)
- South of Scotland Championships-Moffat-(1882-1967)
- Stanraer-(1893)
- Stonehaven-(1948-1964)
- Warriston Park LTC Tournament (1886-1908).
- West of Scotland Championships-(1882-1982)
- West Teviotdale (Hawick) Open-(1883-1887)
- Wemyss Bay Tennis Tournament (1882-1905)
- Whitehouse Open-Edinburgh-(1884-1899).
- WTA Doubles Championships-Edinburgh-(1995-1997)
