= Edinburgh International Exhibition Tournament =

Defunct tennis tournament
- Founded: 1886; 139 years ago
- Abolished: 1886; 139 years ago
- Location: Edinburgh, Midlothian, Scotland
- Venue: Edinburgh International Exhibition
- Surface: Wood/Clay

The Edinburgh International Exhibition Tournament was an open men's and women's tennis staged only one time in 1886. The tournament was part of the sports event programmes played at the International Exhibition of Industry, Science and Art, in Edinburgh, Midlothian, Scotland.

== History ==
The International Exhibition of Industry, Science and Art held in Edinburgh, Scotland in 1886 was the first universal international exhibition to be staged in Scotland. The exhibition ran from 6 May until 28 October 1886. As part of part of the sports event programmes played at the International Exhibition, there was allotted to editions of tennis tournaments to be played, the first 26 to 29 July, and the second 14 to 17 September. The tournament was played on indoor wood courts and outdoor clay courts. The event was only held one time, as part of the international exhibition that attracted 2,750,000 visitors throughout its staging.

== See also ==
- Tennis in Scotland
- Tennis Scotland

== Finals ==
=== Men's Singles (July) ===
Year	Winner	Runner-up	Surface	Score
1886	(Scotland) Archibald Thomson	(England) John Frances	Clay	6-2, 6–2, 2–0, ret.

=== Men's Singles (Sept) ===
Notes:Two events played in September.

Year	Winner	Runner-up	Surface	Score
1886 (1st)	(Scotland) Herbert Bowes-Lyon	(Scotland) Richard Millar Watson	Wood (i)	6-4, 3–6, 6–3.
1886 (2nd)	(Scotland) Alfred Aitken Thomson	(England) Walter William Chamberlain	Grass	3-6, 6-4, 6-1, 4-6, 6-3.
