= Scottish Lowlands Championships =

Defunct tennis tournament
- Tour: ILTF World Circuit
- Founded: 1920; 106 years ago
- Abolished: 1949; 77 years ago
- Location: Peebles; Peeblesshire; Scotland
- Venue: Peebles Hydro
- Surface: Clay - outdoors

The Scottish Lowlands Championships was a combined men's and women's Scottish Lawn Tennis Association affiliated clay court tennis tournament founded in 1920. The tournament was staged at the Peebles Hydropathic Hotel, Peebles, Peeblesshire, Scotland, Great Britain until 1949 when it was discontinued.

== See also ==
- Tennis in Scotland
