= Gerald Peacocke =

Gerald Peacocke may refer to:

- Gerry Peacocke, Australian politician
- Gerald Peacocke (priest), Irish priest and tennis player
