= Scottish Central District Open Championships =

Defunct tennis tournament
- Tour: ILTF World Circuit
- Founded: 1912; 113 years ago
- Abolished: 1968; 57 years ago
- Location: Bridge of Allan; Stirling
- Venue: Various
- Surface: Clay - outdoors

The Scottish Central District Open Championships was a combined Scottish LTA affiliated clay court tennis tournament founded in 1912 as the Scottish Central Championships. The event was a closed tournament up till 1939 and was first played at Bridge of Allan, Scotland. Following World War II it then became an open international event and was moved permanently to Stirling, Scotland until 1968 when it was discontinued.

== See also ==
- Tennis in Scotland
