= Types of tennis match =

Traditionally, tennis is played between two people in a singles match, or two pairs in a doubles match. Tennis can also be played on different courts, including grass courts, clay courts, hard courts, and artificial grass courts.

== Standard types of match ==
Singles involves two players competing against each other, usually two men or two women, although games between a man and a woman may be played on an informal basis or as exhibitions. The game starts with one player serving the ball from the right side of the court behind the baseline. The other player must stand behind or close to the baseline on the left side of the court. The server then hits the ball over the net into the diagonally opposite service box. The receiver must let the ball bounce before hitting it back over the net. If the receiver hits the ball before one bounce or after two bounces then is called "fault". The game continues until one of the players fails to hit the ball over the net or hits it outside the boundaries off the court.

Doubles is played by two teams of two players each, most often all-male or all-female. It utilizes a wider court than singles matches: it includes the area in the alley (tramlines, in British terminology), whereas singles does not. The two players on the receiving side change positions after each point played (one at the net and the other near the baseline, preparing to return serve). Most of the singles rules are applicable for doubles tennis, but there are few exceptions. First and foremost, the court side is wider. The boundaries are extended from side to side to the doubles sidelines. This includes the alleys between the singles and doubles sidelines on the court. The doubles tennis court boundaries are only in play after the ball is served. Players serve for one total game and then the serve rotates to the other team. Returners must stay on the same side of the court, known as the deuce side or ads side for the duration of the set as the server continuously switches sides after each point.

Mixed doubles is played the same as doubles, but with one man and one woman per team. This form of tennis is rare in the professional game because the men's and women's tours are organized separately (by the ATP and WTA, respectively). However, all four Grand Slam tournaments hold a mixed doubles competition, alongside the men's and women's doubles, featuring many of the same players. There is also an annual mixed tournament for national teams, the Hopman Cup, which includes mixed doubles matches. Additionally, there have been mixed doubles events at the Summer Olympics on various occasions (In 1900, from 1912 until 1920 and again since 2012).

While players are gradually less competitive in singles by their late 30s and early 40s, they can still continue competitively in doubles and mixed doubles (as instanced by Martina Navratilova and John McEnroe, who won doubles titles in their 40s).

== Other types of match ==
=== Australian doubles / American doubles ===
An informal and unsanctioned form of tennis, this is played with similar rules to Canadian doubles, only in this version, players rotate court position after each game. As such, each player plays doubles and singles over the course of a match, with the singles player always serving. Scoring styles vary, but one popular method is to assign a value of two points to each game, with the server taking both points by holding serve, and the doubles team each taking one if they break. This format is usually known as "American doubles" in the United Kingdom and Australia. In South Africa it is called "American singles", or cut-throat tennis. It is also found in the Caribbean.

=== Blind and low vision tennis ===
Blind and low vision tennis (also known as blind tennis in Japan, its country of origin, and as sound tennis in some parts of the world) is competed in four types of classification where the B1 (blind) group requires players to wear a blindfold and utilises special balls, which make a sound upon contact with the court. It usually uses a smaller court and a lower net than standard tennis; up to three bounces may be allowed before returning the ball. While sound tennis is not part of ITF, ATP, and WTA tournaments, an international tournament is held annually, and world rankings are published for male and female players with different degrees of disability.

=== Canadian doubles ===
When three players are available, modified rules can accommodate the mismatch so that the single player does not have to be significantly better than the doubles team. The only major rule variation between Canadian doubles and traditional doubles tennis is that the team of two players can only hit the ball within the singles lines, whilst the single player can hit into the full doubles court.

=== Mini-tennis ===
There is an evolution in tennis training that employs the use of low-compression balls and in some cases modified court sizes. Organisations around the world have begun to use lower compression balls and modified court sizes as a way to reach out to younger tennis players interested in tennis. The use of low-compression balls and modified court sizes is meant to ease the process into becoming a competitive or amateur tennis player. The low-compression balls are coloured differently to indicate the level of compression. Young players and beginners are likely to find the game easier to learn because the balls do not bounce as high or travel as fast as "normal" balls. The modified smaller courts make covering the court, or reaching the opponent's shot, easier as well.

=== Wheelchair tennis ===
Played in both singles and doubles forms by people in wheelchairs. The main difference is that the ball may bounce twice before it is hit, the second bounce may even be outside the court. All four Grand Slam tournaments include wheelchair tennis.

== See also ==
- Tennis court
- Tennis games
- Deck tennis
- Beach tennis
- Soft tennis
