= Highland Championships =

Defunct tennis tournament
- Tour: ILTF Circuit
- Founded: 1896
- Abolished: 1981 (44 years ago)
- Location: Pitlochry, Perthshire, Scotland
- Venue: Atholl Palace Hotel
- Surface: Grass

The Highland Championships (informally called the Scottish Highland Championships) was a men's and women's grass court tennis tournament first established in 1896 as part of the Atholl Hydropathic Open Lawn Tennis Tournament. Also known as the Bell's Highland Championships for sponsorship reasons (1974–1981).

The championships were first held at the Athole Hydropathic tennis courts, Pitlochry, Perthshire, Scotland. The tournament was staged annually as part of the ILTF Circuit until 1981.

== History ==
In 1878, the Atholl Hydropathic was opened. In August 1896, the hotel established its first lawn tennis event, the Atholl Hydropathic Open Lawn Tennis Tournament of which the Highland Lawn Tennis Championship Trophy was played for as part of the gentleman's singles programme. It was part of the Scottish Lawn Tennis Association (SLTA) circuit from inception. In 1913, the venue's name was changed to the Athol Palace Hotel. The championships were temporarily suspended during both the first and second world wars. It continued to be held annually as part of the official international ILTF Circuit from 1913. At the 1930 championships 149 players entered the tournament for play.

In 1974, the Scottish whisky company Arthur Bell & Sons Ltd. decided to sponsor the event under the brand name the Bell's Highland Championships. That year, 14-year-old Judith Erskine (future mother of grand slam champion Andy Murray) won all three titles of the Bell's Junior Championship of the Highlands. It ran until 1981, when it ceased to part of the international worldwide tennis circuit. The tournament continues to be staged at the same venue today, now known as the Highland Tennis Championships, or Tennis Championships of the Highlands. The tournament is currently administered by Tennis Scotland.

== Venue ==
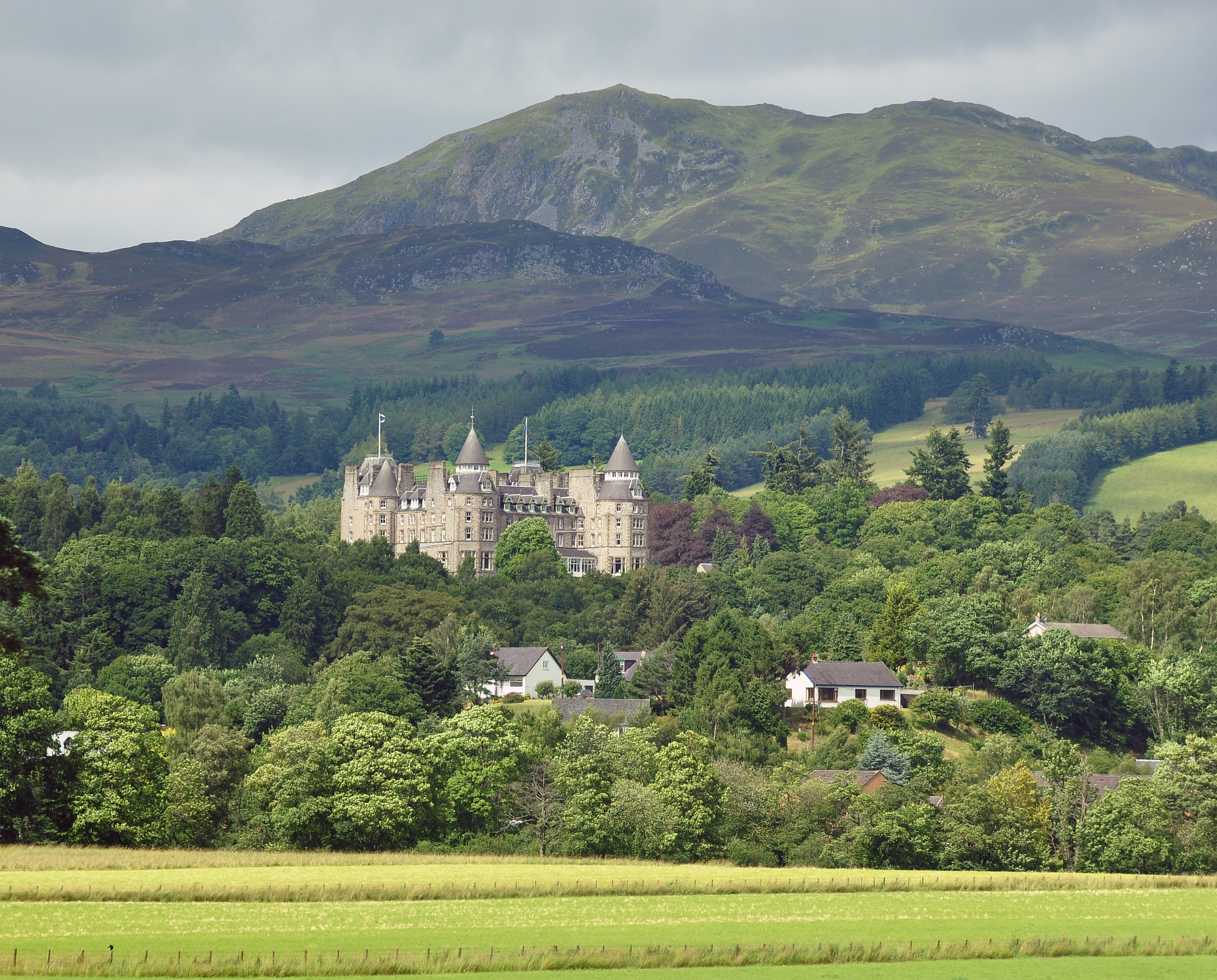
Atholl Palace, Pitlochry venue for this tennis event.

In 1874, the Perthshire architect, Andrew Heiton was commissioned to design a Scottish baronial-style hydropathic establishment, with accommodation. In 1878, the building was officially opened and named the Athole Hydropathic. In 1913, its name was changed to The Atholl Palace Hotel.

== Finals ==
=== Men's singles ===
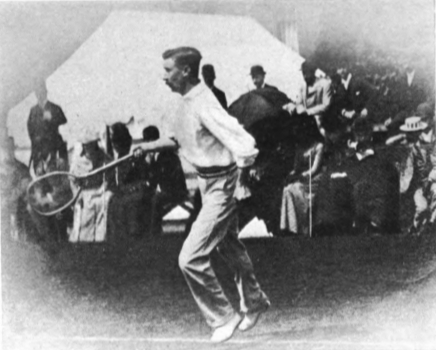
Harry S. Barlow first men's singles champion c. 1900.

(incomplete roll)

Year	Champions	Runners-up	Score
↓ SLTA Circuit ↓
Highland Lawn Tennis Championship Trophy
1897	(Ireland) Harry Sibthorpe Barlow	(United Kingdom) Clement Cazalet	w.o.
1899	(Ireland) Sydney Lawrence Fry	(United Kingdom) Rupert Hamblin-Smith	6–1, 6–3, 6–4
1900	(Scotland) Alfred Aitken Thomson	(Scotland) Richard Millar Watson	w.o.
Highland Lawn Tennis Championships
1901	(Ireland) Sydney Lawrence Fry (2)	(Ireland) James Cecil Parke	6–1, 6–4, 1–6, 6–2
1903	(United Kingdom) E.G. Whittle	(United Kingdom) C.H. Moss	6–1, 6–3, 4–6, 6–2
1905	(Scotland) W.E. McKechnie	(United Kingdom) T.B. Pollard	6–4, 2–6, 6–4, 6–2
↓ ILTF Circuit ↓
Highland Championships
1938	(United Kingdom) Colin Gregory	(Republic of Ireland) Alfred Eustace Fannin	6–4, 3–6, 8–6
1940/1945	Not held (due to World War II)		
1947	(Scotland) David M. Duncan	(Scotland) S.H. Allan	6–2, 7–5
1948	(Scotland) John Stewart Ross	(Scotland) G.W. O'Connor	7–5, 7–5
1949	(United Kingdom) John C. George Savile	(Australia) Arthur J. Gould	8–10, 6–2, 6–0
1950	(Poland) Tadeusz Slawek	(United Kingdom) John C. George Savile	6–1, 6–1
1951	(Poland) Tadeusz Slawek (2)	(Scotland) R.H. Thomson	6–3, 6–1
1952	(Poland) Tadeusz Slawek (3)	(United Kingdom) A.G. Potter	6–0, 7–5
1953	(United Kingdom) A.L. Graeme	(United Kingdom) N.J. Gibson	6–4, 4–6, 6–2
1954	(Republic of Ireland) John R. Maguire	(United Kingdom) D.B. Dempsey	6–3, 6–1
1955	(Australia) Brian Douglas Ford	(United Kingdom) J.J. Carmichael	6–1, 6–2
1956	(United Kingdom) Alan Ronald Mills	(United Kingdom) D.B. Dempsey	6–0, 6–3
1957	(Scotland) D.B. Dempsey	(United Kingdom) A. Bloomfield	6–3, 6–2
1959	(United States) Aaron S. Black	(Scotland) D.C. Burrows	13–11, 6–1
1960	(Scotland) D.B. Dempsey (2)	(United States) Aaron S. Black	2–6, 11–9, 6–0
1961	(Scotland) D.B. Dempsey (3)	(United Kingdom) Ken Riley	6–3, 4–6, 6–1
1962	(United Kingdom) Mark Cox	(Australia) John Blizard	6–3, 6–0
1964	(Scotland) J.C. Reynolds	(Scotland) T.C. MacNair	6–2, 6–2
↓ Open era ↓
1972	(United Kingdom) John Graham Clifton	(United Kingdom) David Alan Lloyd	6–2, 6–2
Bell's Highland Championships
1975	(United Kingdom) David Alan Lloyd	(United States) Hugh Thomson	6–3, 6–0
1976	(Scotland) Graeme Notman	(Scotland) Ken Revie	6–3, 6–2
1977	(United Kingdom) Jasper Cooper	(United Kingdom) Robbie Rockwell	4–6, 6–2, 6–4
1978	(United Kingdom) K. Reynolds	(Australia) Peter Littlewood	6–3, 6–3
1979	(United Kingdom) K. Reynolds (2)	(Scotland) J. McKechnie	6–4, 6–3
1980	(United Kingdom) Mark Powell	(Scotland) Keith Kordula	6–3, 6–2
1981	(Scotland) P. Priest	(Scotland) N. Carmichaell	6–3, 6–3

=== Women's singles ===
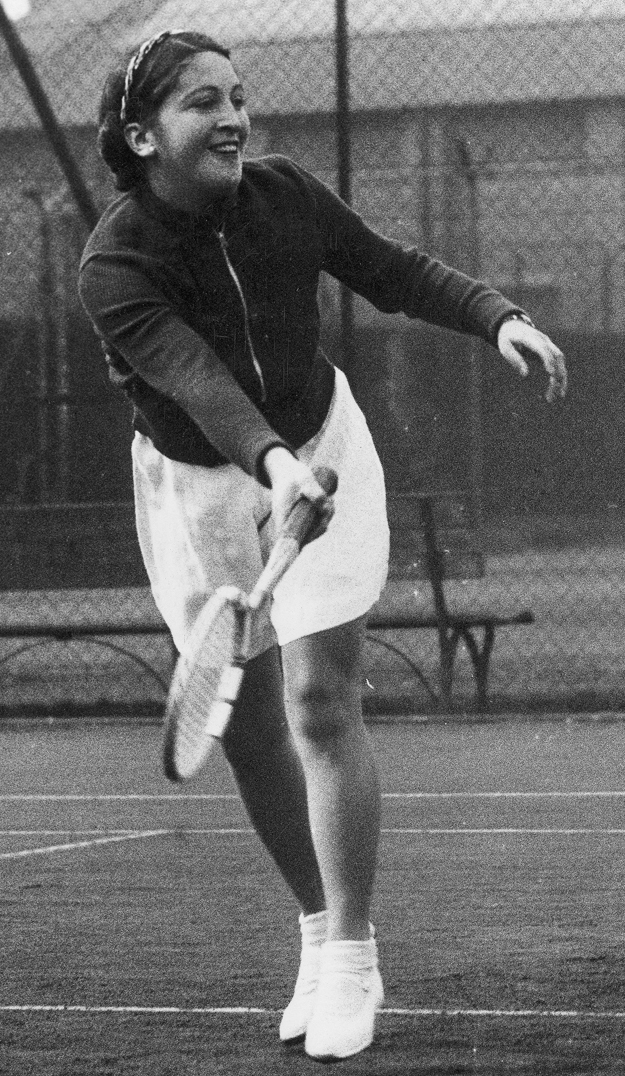
Anita Lizana of Chile won 1 singles titles.

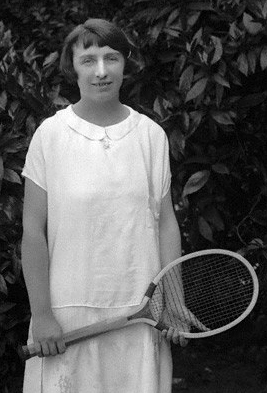
Esna Boyd of Australian won 2 singles titles.

(incomplete roll)

Year	Champions	Runners-up	Score
↓ SLTA Circuit ↓
Highland Lawn Tennis Championship Trophy
1897	(Scotland) Lottie Paterson	(Scotland) Jane Corder	6–3, 6–3
1899	(Ireland) Florence Stanuell	(Scotland) Lottie Paterson	6–2, 3–6, 6–2
1900	(Ireland) Ruth Dyas Durlacher	(Scotland) Lottie Paterson	6–4, 6–3
Highland Lawn Tennis Championships
1903	(Scotland) Alice Maud Ferguson	(England) Minnie Hunter	6–3, 8–6
↓ ILTF Circuit ↓
Highland Championships
1922	(Scotland) Mary Gray Welsh	(England) Mary Thom	6–1, 9–7
1928	(Scotland) Winifred Mason	(India) Olga Webb	1–6, 6–1, 6–3
1929	(Scotland) Winifred Mason (2)	(United Kingdom) Geraldine Beamish	6–0, 6–4
1933	(Australia) Esna Boyd Robertson	(Australia) Joan Hartigan	6–2, 6–2
1934	(Australia) Esna Boyd Robertson (2)	(United Kingdom) Kathleen Robertson	6-2, 6-0
1935	(United Kingdom) Madge Slaney	(Australia) Esna Boyd Robertson	6–2, 6–1
1936	(Chile) Anita Lizana	(United Kingdom) Madge Slaney	6–4, 6–3
1940/1945	Not held (due to World War II)		
1948	(Poland) Helena Czolowska	(Republic of Ireland) Betty Lombard	6–2, 7–5
1950	(United Kingdom) Mrs C.M. Mitchell	(United Kingdom) Chloe Rhodes	6–4, 2–6, 8–6
1952	(United Kingdom) Joyce Reid	(United Kingdom) E. Vlandy	6–0, 7–5
1953	(South Africa) Beryl Bartlett	(Poland) Helena Czolowska	6–3, 4–6, 6–4
1961	(United Kingdom) Ann McAlpine	(United Kingdom) Sally Holdsworth	6–1, 6–4
1962	(Scotland) Joyce Barclay	(United Kingdom) Alison Stroud	7–5, 6–3
1967	(Scotland) Winnie Shaw	(Australia) Margaret H. O'Donnell	6–4, 7–5
↓ Open era ↓
Bell's Highland Championships
1975	(Scotland) Joyce Barclay Hume (2)	(Scotland) Winnie Shaw Wooldridge	6–8, 6–0, 6–3
1976	(Scotland) Joyce Barclay Hume (3)	(United Kingdom) Jill Cottrell	6–3, 7–5
1977	(United Kingdom) Jill Cottrell	(United Kingdom) Marjorie Love	1–6, 6–1, 6–2
1978	(United Kingdom) Jill Cottrell (2)	(United Kingdom) E. Armstrong	6–1, 6–4
1979	(United Kingdom) G. Armstrong	(United Kingdom) Eleanor Lightbody	7–5, 6–8, 6–3
1980	(United Kingdom) D. Boothman	(United Kingdom) L. Ristic	10–8, 6–2
1981	(United Kingdom) L. Reid	(United Kingdom) D. Boothman	6–4, 6–1

== Event names ==
- Highland Lawn Tennis Championship Trophy (1896–1900)
- Highland Lawn Tennis Championships (1901–1913)
- Highland Championships (1914–1973)
- Bell's Highland Championships (1974–1981)
