= Padel in India =

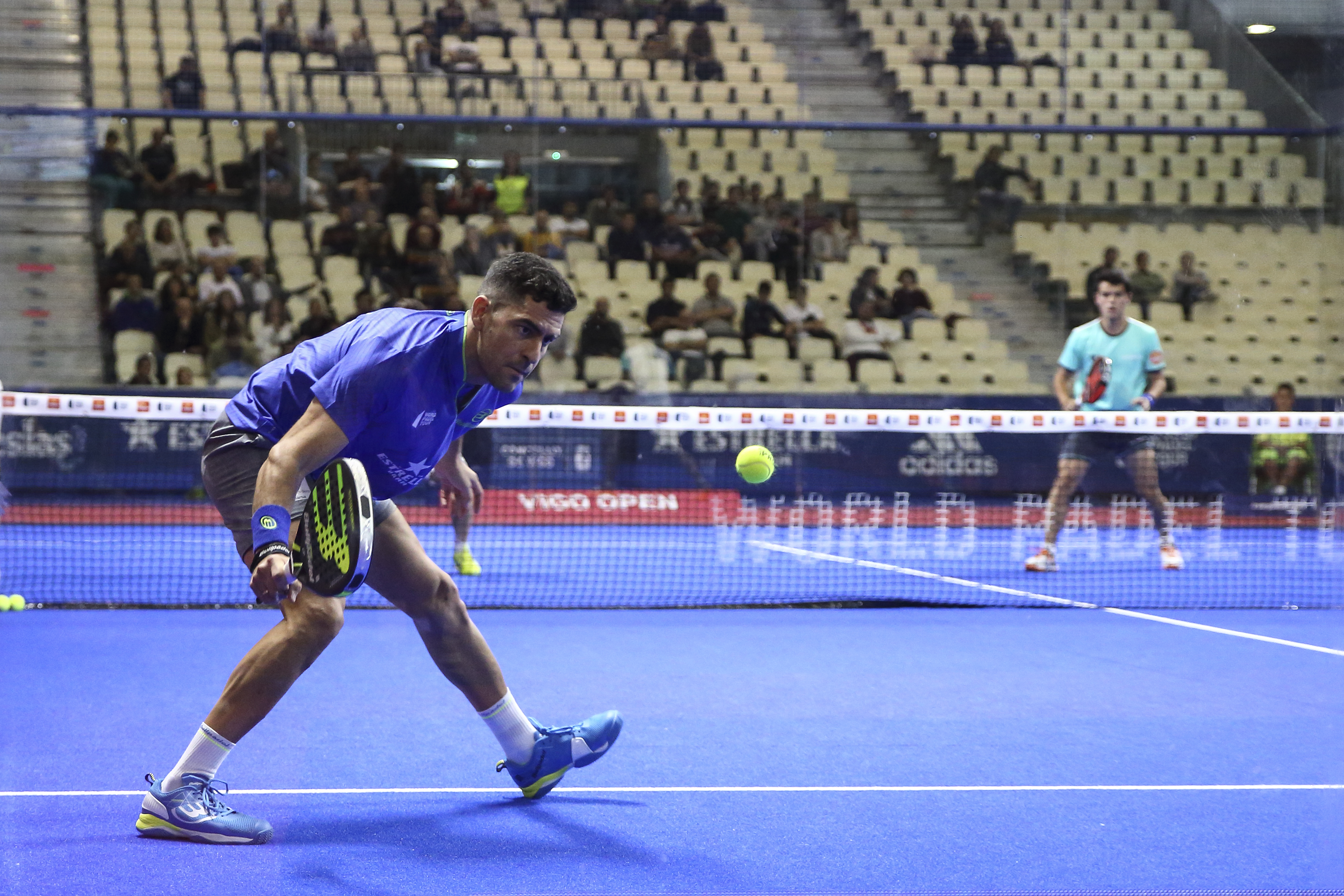
- Country: India
- Governing body: Indian Padel Federation
- National team: India

Padel is a rapidly growing sport in India, with increasing popularity and infrastructure development across the country.

From the first court in Bangalore in 2017, India had 100 padel courts in 2024 and several padel clubs have sprung up across major metropolitan cities such as Mumbai, Delhi, Hyderabad, and Kolkata. The popularity is causing waiting lists for booking courts.

The sport is administered by the Indian Padel Federation (IPF). Established in 2016, the IPF has organised 9 annual national ranking events as of 2025. The federation has received official endorsement from the Indian Olympic Association .

Since padel is an expensive sport and India is a price-sensitive territory, stakeholders are working to bring down the costs of the sport.

The sport is also being played in Chandigarh.
