= Galashiels Open =

Scottish tennis tournament

Galashiels Open Galashiels Championship

Defunct tennis tournament
- Tour: SLTA Circuit (1895-1912); ILTF Circuit (1913-1920)
- Founded: 1884; 142 years ago
- Abolished: 1920; 106 years ago
- Location: Galashiels Scotland
- Venue: Mossilee Cricket Ground
- Surface: Grass

The Galashiels Open was a men's and women's grass court tennis tournament founded in 1884 early editions of the singles events were called the Galashiels Championship. It was organised by Gala Lawn Tennis Club, and played at the Mossilee Cricket Ground, Galashiels Scotland through till 1920 when it was discontinued as a stand-alone event.

== History ==
The first Gala Lawn Tennis Club was founded in 1884. That year it held the first Galashiels Open tournament, that featured three events men's singles and doubles and a mixed doubles event. In 1886 the event featured Wimbledon player George Kerr. The tournament organised by the Gala Club was usually played at the Galashiels Cricket Club Mossilee Cricket Ground. In 1895 the tournament was held in conjunction with the first Border Lawn Tennis Championships (1895–1965) until the early 1900s. That tournament moved to be played on cinder courts (clay) at Langhaugh Gardens, Galashiels circa. 1905. The tournament continued till around 1920.

== Finals ==
=== Men's singles ===
(Incomplete roll)

Year	Champions	Runners-up	Score
1884	(Scotland) Alfred Aitken Thomson	(England) S.C. Knott	6–5, 6–1, 6–2.
1886	(England) Arthur John Neville Story	(Scotland) George Kerr	7–9, 6–4, 6–2, 7–9, 6–0.
1887	(Scotland) Richard Millar Watson	(England) James Hill Conyers	6–3, 6–1, 6–1.

=== Men's doubles ===
(Incomplete roll)

Year	Champions	Runners-up	Score
1884	(Scotland) E.M. Inglis (Scotland) S.C. Knott	(Scotland) Alex Buchanan (Scotland) Forrester John Thomson	3–6, 6–3, 6–3, 7–9, 6–4.
1887	(England) Arthur John Neville Story (Scotland) Richard Millar Watson	(Scotland) Kenneth Sanderson (England) James Hill Conyers	6–4, 6–3, 6–4.

=== Mixed doubles ===
(Incomplete roll)

Year	Champions	Runners-up	Score
1884	(Scotland) Alfred Aitken Thomson (Scotland) Miss. Ness	(England) W. Smith (England) Miss Ash	6–3, 3–6, 6–4.

== See also ==
- Galashiels
- Tennis in Scotland
