= Gerald Peacocke (priest) =

Irish religious leader (1869–1950)

The Venerable Gerald William Peacocke
- Archdeacon of Kildare
- Church: Church of Ireland
- Diocese: Kildare

Personal details
- Born: 25 June 1869 Monkstown, Dublin, Ireland
- Died: 5 September 1950 (aged 81) Monkstown, Dublin, Ireland
- Denomination: Anglican

The Rev. Gerald William Peacocke (25 June 1869 – 5 September 1950) was an Irish religious leader and sportsman who served as Archdeacon of Kildare (1923–1944). He was the son of Joseph Peacocke who had been Archbishop of Dublin.

== Career ==
Gerald William Peacocke was born on 25 June 1869, in Dublin, County Dublin, Ireland. He attended Trinity College, Dublin where he was eventually awarded a Master of Arts in theology studies. He took holy orders, he was appointed curate of Holywood, County Down. In 1900 he was appointed Rector of Dundela Church in east Belfast. In 1913 then appointed Rector of Geashill St Mary, in the Diocese of Meath and Kildare. In 1923 he was appointed Archdeacon of Kildare a position he held for twenty years.

He died on 5 September 1950, in Ireland, at the age of 81.

== Sportsman ==
Peacocke was also a notable amateur lawn tennis player who competed at tournaments throughout Great Britain and Ireland. He was an All-Comers finalist at the Scottish Championships held at Castle Wemyss one time in 1894 where he lost to Richard Millar Watson. He mainly took part in the Wemyss Bay Tennis Tournament between 1891 and 1899. His career singles highlights include winning the gentleman's singles event as part of the Castle Wemyss Open four times (1893–1894, 1898–1899), where he was awarded the Castle Wemyss Cup.

== Family ==
His father was The Most Reverend Joseph Ferguson Peacocke, and his mother, Caroline Sophia Irvine. He married Kathleen Amelia Crozier on 15 September 1896, in Ireland. They had 5 children.
