= Joseph Peacocke (archbishop of Dublin) =

Irish bishop (1835–1916)

The Right Reverend Joseph Peacocke
- Archbishop of Dublin; Bishop of Glendalough; Primate of Ireland
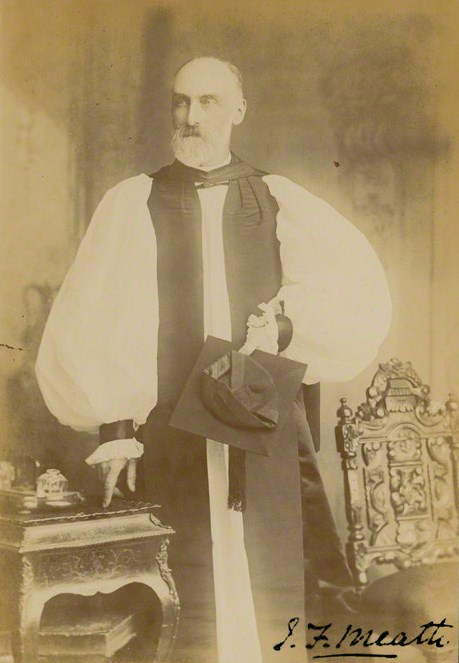
- Signed photograph of J.F. Peacocke as Bishop of Meath
- Church: Church of Ireland
- Diocese: Dublin
- Elected: 19 May 1897
- In office: 1897–1916
- Predecessor: William Plunket
- Successor: John Bernard
- Previous post: Bishop of Meath (1894-1897)

Orders
- Ordination: 1859
- Consecration: 11 June 1894 by William Plunket

Personal details
- Born: 5 November 1835 Abbeyleix, Queen's County, Ireland
- Died: 26 May 1916 (aged 80) Blackrock, Dublin, Ireland
- Denomination: Anglican
- Spouse: Caroline Sophia Irvine
- Children: 5

Joseph Ferguson Peacocke (5 November 1835 – 26 May 1916) was a Church of Ireland cleric. He was the Bishop of Meath from 1894 to 1897 and then Archbishop of Dublin from 1897 until 1915. He was also briefly the professor of pastoral theology at Trinity College, Dublin.

== Early life ==
Born at Abbeyleix, Queen's County (now County Laois), Peacocke was the son of George Peacocke, who was a physician at Longford, and of his wife Catherine Ferguson. Educated at Trinity College, Dublin, he graduated BA in 1857 with a first-class divinity testimonium. He was senior moderator in history and English literature in 1856 and won that year's Dublin University prize for political economy.

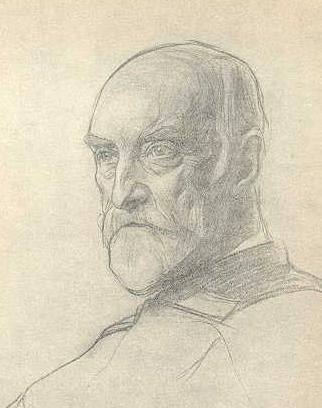
Peacocke, drawn in 1908 by Philip de László

== Career ==
Peacocke was ordained a deacon in 1858 and a priest of the Church of Ireland in 1859. He was curate at St Mary's, Kilkenny, from 1858 until 1861, then for two years took up the position of secretary to the Hibernian Church Missionary Society. He was on the evangelical wing of the church and believed especially in foreign missions and in the Church Missionary Society. From 1863 until 1873, he was curate of Monkstown Church, County Dublin. in 1873 he was appointed rector of St. George's Church, Dublin, a significant parish. In 1878 he returned to Monkstown as rector and remained until he was elected a bishop. He became a canon of St Patrick's Cathedral, Dublin, he was awarded the degree of Doctor of Divinity in 1883, and for a few months in 1894 he held the professorship of pastoral theology in Trinity College.

In 1894, Peacocke was elected bishop of Meath, where he was consecrated on 11 June 1894. On 19 May 1897, he was translated to become archbishop of Dublin (with which the dioceses of Glendalough and Kildare were united) and became the first archbishop of Dublin in two centuries to have served as a parish priest in the diocese. He presided successfully over his dioceses, serving also as a visiting preacher at Cambridge, until 1915, when he resigned on the grounds of ill health.

Peacock died at Hastings, Blackrock, in May 1916, and his memorial tablet in Kildare Cathedral says that he was a Pastor fidelis, humilis, et sanctus corde ("a faithful, humble and holy pastor"). According to the Oxford Dictionary of National Biography, his reputation was for "tolerance, holiness, and varied pastoral experience" and also as "a man of fine presence".

== Family ==
In 1865, Peacocke married Caroline Sophia Irvine. They had one daughter and four sons. Their eldest son, Joseph Irvine Peacocke, was elected bishop of Derry and Raphoe a few weeks before his father's death, while the other sons included George John Peacocke and the Rev. Gerald William Peacocke.

== Likeness ==
A portrait in oils of Peacocke by Philip de László (working sketch illustrated) was presented to him by the diocese and is now to be seen in the bishop's palace at Dublin. A sketch for this is reproduced in de László's book Painting a Portrait (1937).

Anglican Communion titles
Preceded by The Lord Plunket	Archbishop of Dublin; 1897–1915	Succeeded by John Bernard
