= Tennikoit =

Sport

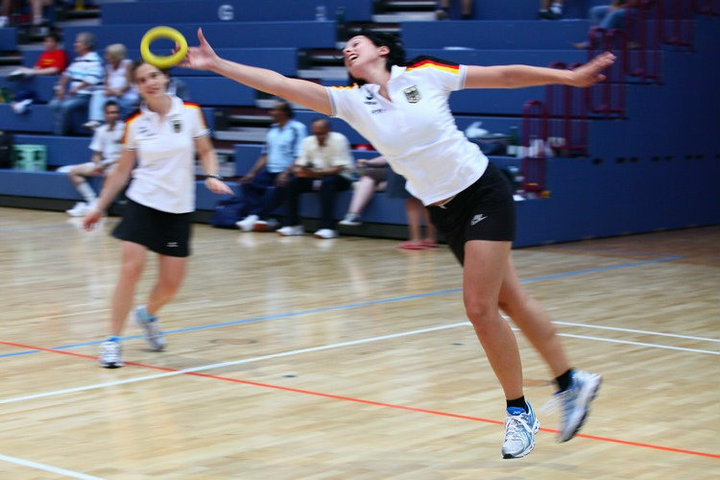
- Tennikoit, a.k.a. "Ring tennis" at the 2010 World Championships (women's doubles)
- Nicknames: Ring tennis, tenniquoits
- First played: unclear; more immediate ancestor likely the game of deck tennis; some sources claim a German origin

Characteristics
- Contact: No
- Team members: Singles; Doubles; Mixed Doubles
- Mixed-sex: Separate men's and women's competitions; Mixed teams: 1 male 1 female
- Type: Indoor or outdoor
- Equipment: Rubber ring

Presence
- Olympic: No
- Paralympic: No
- World Games: No

Tennikoit (also known as ring tennis or tenniquoits) is a court sport where players hurl a circular rubber ring over a central net. Similar to tennis or badminton, the objective is to catch the opponent's throw and return it before it touches the ground, scoring points when the ring lands within the opponent's boundaries.

Originating as a variation of deck tennis played on early 20th-century cruise ships, modern tennikoit is played on both indoor and outdoor courts. The sport features singles, doubles, and mixed doubles disciplines. While played globally, it maintains its strongest following in Germany, South Africa, Brazil, Venezuela, India, Pakistan, and Bangladesh.

A standard match is typically played in a best-of-three sets format, with each set played to 21 points. The game begins with a diagonal serve from behind the baseline. During rallies, players must catch the ring with only one hand and return it over the 1.8-meter-high net in a single, continuous motion. Points are awarded when the opponent fails to catch the ring, throws it out of bounds, touches it with their body, or commits a technical fault such as holding the ring for too long or wobbling it during a throw.

== History ==
Maritime Origins

The exact origins of modern tennikoit trace back to the early 20th century, evolving from the recreational game of "deck tennis." Played predominantly by mariners and passengers on British and American ocean liners, it was created to keep travelers physically active. Originally, players used a simple ring made of spliced rope. As the game grew in popularity, the heavy rope ring was replaced by a more aerodynamic and durable rubber ring.

Transition to Land and Early Adoption

By the 1920s and 1930s, the game was brought ashore. It was quickly adopted by school and university physical education programs in the United States, the United Kingdom, and Australia. The sports simultaneously gained a strong, independent foothold in Germany and South Africa, leading to the establishment of early national championships.

Institutionalization in India

Introduced to South India by British sailors, the game thrived because it was inexpensive, required minimal space, and could be played on almost any surface. To organize the rapidly growing sport, the Tennikoit Federation of India (TKFI) was established in Hyderabad in 1965. On August 19, 1981, the Government of India officially recognized tennikoit as a national sport.

Global Standardization

To unify the globally scattered sport, the World Tenniquoits Federation was founded in April 2004 in South Africa. Spearheaded by Germany, India, and South Africa, the WTF standardized the global rulebook, culminating in the first-ever World Tenniquoits Championship hosted in Chennai, India, in 2006.

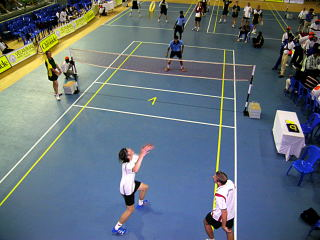
Men's doubles at a 2006 Tennikoit (ring-tennis) match

== Rules and Regulations ==
Based on the official international rules adopted by the Tennikoit Federation of India, the game is strictly regulated to ensure fast-paced, continuous play.

Match Format and Scoring

Sets: A standard match is played in a best-of-three sets format.

Points: A set is won by the first player or team to reach 21 points, provided they maintain a minimum lead of two points. If the score ties at 20–20, the first to secure the 22nd point wins the set.

Time Limits: To prevent stalling, if a set exceeds a stipulated 15-minute time limit, a "nine-rally rule" is introduced. Once enacted, the server must win the point within nine exchanges over the net; failing to do so awards the point to the opponent.

Service and Gameplay

Serving: The match begins with an underhand serve from behind the baseline, thrown diagonally into the opponent's court. Each player is awarded five consecutive serves, regardless of who wins the point. If the score reaches 20–20, serves alternate after every single point.

One-Handed Play: Players must catch and return the ring using only one hand. The ring cannot be passed from one hand to the other after being caught.

Fluid Motion: The ring must be returned immediately in a continuous, fluid motion. Catching the ring and pausing before throwing (a delayed shot) is heavily penalized.

Faults

Points are actively scored when the opponent fails to catch the ring, or passively scored if the opponent commits a technical fault. Common faults include: Throwing the ring out of bounds or into the dead court.

"Wobbling" or shaking the ring during its flight over the net.

Executing a "downward shot" (throwing the ring in a steep, aggressive downward trajectory instead of an upward or horizontal tendency).

Touching the ring with any part of the body other than the catching hand.

Using both hands simultaneously to catch or throw the ring.

== Equipment ==
While the court setup visually resembles badminton, tennikoit requires highly specific, standardized equipment governed by the World Tenniquoits Federation (WTF). The Koit (Ring)

The defining piece of equipment is the koit—a firm, circular ring designed for aerodynamic flight and one-handed catching.

Material: Solid or sponge rubber with a smooth, plain surface to ensure stable rotation; it contains no internal air.

Dimensions: The inner diameter must be 11 to 12 cm, and the outer diameter 16 to 18 cm. The ring has a uniform thickness of roughly 3 cm.

Weight: Official tournament rings must weigh exactly between 190 and 220 grams.

Court Dimensions

Overall Size: The court measures 12.2 by 5.5 meters for all formats (singles, doubles, and mixed doubles) and is bisected by a center net.

Dead Court: A "dead zone" extends 0.9 meters on either side of the center net. If the ring lands in this 1.8-meter-wide central area, it is considered a fault.

[Key Insight: The 1.8-meter total "dead zone" straddling the net dictates the entire strategy of the game—it eliminates the ability to do short "drop shots" right over the net, forcing players to hurl the heavy 220-gram ring deep into the opponent's territory.]

== Strategies and Tactics ==
Despite the simple premise of catching and throwing, competitive tennikoit is a highly tactical sport that relies heavily on stamina, court positioning, and aerodynamic control of the ring.

Spin Manipulation: Spinning the ring (koit) upon release is the most fundamental skill in the sport. Players use a sharp wrist-snap to impart flat, horizontal rotation. A tightly spinning ring cuts through the air faster, resists aerodynamic "wobbling", and is significantly harder for an opponent to gripcleanly.

Exploiting the Dead Zone: Because the dead zone prevents short drop shots, players frequently use deep baseline throws to push the opponent to the back of the court, following up with sharp, angled throws aimed at the extreme front corners.

Pacing and Stamina: Rallies can be physically grueling due to the strict "continuous motion" rule. Defensive players often throw high, deep lobs without spin to buy time to recover. Offensive playerscounter with flat, fast-spinning cross-court drives to exhaust the opponent's lateral movement.

Targeting the Weak Side: Forcing an opponent to catch on their non-dominant side (a backhand catch) or throwing the ring directly at their chest forces an awkward, compressed catch, increasing the likelihood of a technical fault.

== Stance and Court Positioning ==
The Ready Position: Feet are positioned slightly wider than shoulder-width apart with the knees bent and the body's weight balanced on the balls of the feet, allowing for explosive lateral movement.

Arm Readiness: Unlike racket sports, tennikoit players must keep their hands elevated and in front of their torso to instantly react with either a forehand or backhand one-handed catch.

Catching Posture: Players often lunge deeply or shift their weight to their back foot upon impact to act as a shock absorber. This backward momentum is immediately converted into the forward rotation needed to throw the ring back.

Center Recovery: After executing a throw, the player must immediately recover to a central stancebslightly behind the dead zone line to maximize reaction time.

== Scientific Principles ==
The unique flight and catching mechanics of tennikoit are governed by specific principles of aerodynamics, gyroscopic physics, and biomechanics.

Gyroscopic Stability: A tennikoit ring is a solid torus. If thrown without spin, aerodynamic forces will cause it to tumble unpredictably. The rapid, horizontal spin generates angular momentum, creating gyroscopic stability that resists aerodynamic pitching moments and keeps the ring flat.

Biomechanics of the Catch: Catching a 220-gram solid rubber ring at high speeds utilizes the Impulse-Momentum Theorem (J = Δp = FΔt). By lunging backward or bringing their arm back the moment the ring makes contact, players maximize the time (Δt) it takes to decelerate the ring. This drastic increase in deceleration time exponentially reduces the peak impact force (F) exerted on the fingers, preventing blunt trauma and fractures.

Aerodynamic Profile of a Torus: The heavy, rounded edge of the rubber koit deliberately triggers slight turbulence in the boundary layer of the air flowing over it. This turbulent boundary layer stays attached to the curvature of the ring longer than a smooth laminar flow would, reducing the aerodynamic wake.

The Magnus Effect: Advanced players can manipulate the Magnus effect by tilting the axis of the ring's spin, creating an asymmetric pressure differential that causes the ring to curve sharply downward or laterally mid-flight.

== Common Injuries ==
Due to the fast-paced, high-impact nature of catching and hurling a weighted rubber ring, tennikoit carries a specific profile of acute and overuse injuries.

Hand and Finger Trauma: Jammed fingers, interphalangeal joint sprains, and friction burns or blisters on the palms and fingers.

Elbow and Wrist Strain: Repetitive throwing and decelerating motion frequently leads to lateral epicondylitis (tennis elbow) and wrist tendonitis.

Shoulder Overuse: Continuous overhead and diagonal hurling places repetitive strain on the shoulder joint, risking rotator cuff tendinopathy.

Lower Body Injuries: Deep lunges and sudden stops often lead to inversion ankle sprains, patellar tendonitis (jumper's knee), and calf strains.

== In popular culture ==
While modern competitive tennikoit remains a niche sport globally, its direct predecessor—deck tennis— and its regional variations have appeared in media and literature.

Literature: In Roald Dahl's 1984 book Boy: Tales of Childhood, the author details playing deck tennis during his early transcontinental voyages.

Film: The 1936 romantic comedy Piccadilly Jim features a prominent scene of deck tennis on an ocean liner.

Regional School Culture: In India (particularly Tamil Nadu, Andhra Pradesh, Telangana, and Karnataka), "ring tennis" is often recognized as an element of local school culture and a nostalgic childhood symbol.

Literature: In F. Scott Fitzgerald's short story The Rough Crossing, a deck-tennis tournament aboard a transatlantic ocean liner serves as a social backdrop for the characters.

Archival Newsreels: The sport frequently appeared in 1930s theater newsreels. For example, the theatrical short Sport Afloat features passengers playing "ring tennis" on the deck of the SS Honolulu.

Travelogues: Archival travel films, such as the 1938 British feature Outward Bound through the Suez Canal and on to Shanghai, documented passengers organizing deck-tennis matches to pass the time on long voyages.

== Governing Bodies & World Championships ==
The World Tenniquoits Federation (WTF) is the highest international authority for the sport, responsible for maintaining the official international rulebook, regulating equipment standards, andorganizing the World Tenniquoits Championship.

Several countries maintain dedicated national boards:

India: The Tennikoit Federation of India (TKFI) serves as the apex national body. It manages a massive domestic competitive circuit and fields the Indian national team.

Germany: Governed under the umbrella of the German Gymnastic Federation.

South Africa: Governed by the South African Tenniquoits Board.

• World Championships Timeline

The pinnacle of international competition brings together the top national teams. Germany, South Africa, and India—the founding nations—historically dominate the podium.

1st World Championship (2006): Hosted in Chennai, India. The inaugural globally unifiedtournament.

2nd World Championship (2010): Koblenz, Germany.

3rd World Championship (2014): Victoria, South Africa.

4th World Championship (2018): Minsk, Belarus.

5th World Championship (2023): Pretoria, South Africa.

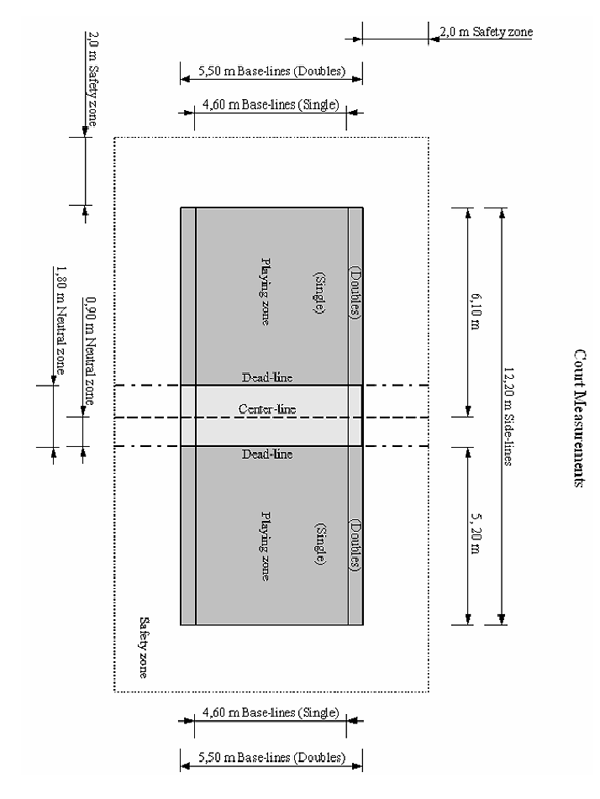
International Ring Tennis court

== Comparison with Badminton ==
Because they share a similar court layout and a "no-bounce" aerial objective, tennikoit is most frequently compared to badminton. However, the physical mechanics and court dimensions differ significantly.

Feature Tennikoit Badminton

Court Length TENNIKOIT 12.2 meters BADMINTON 13.4 meters

Net Height TENNIKOIT 1.8 meters BADMINTON 1.55 meters at the posts

Equipment TENNIKOIT 190–220g rubber ring, bare hands BADMINTON 5g shuttlecock, racket Feature Tennikoit Badminton

Primary Mechanic TENNIKOIT One-handed catching and throwing BADMINTON Striking with a racket

Service Rule TENNIKOIT Underhand toss BADMINTON Underhand strike

Scoring System TENNIKOIT 21 points (blocks of 5 serves) BADMINTON 21 points (rally scoring)

The most fundamental strategic difference is the net height and the "dead zone." A badminton net is lower (1.55m), allowing for steep smash shots and delicate drop shots right over the tape. Tennikoit’s much taller net (1.8m) combined with a 1.8-meter-wide "dead zone" removes the possibility of short dropshots.
