= Wemyss Bay Tennis Tournament =

Wemyss Bay Tournament

Defunct tennis tournament
- Event name: Inverkip Rovers LTC Tournament (1882-1886); Inverkip Rovers Closed Championships (1882-1888); Inverkip Rovers Open (1885-1889); Castle Wemyss Open (1890-1905)
- Tour: Scottish LTA Circuit
- Founded: 1882; 143 years ago
- Abolished: 1905; 120 years ago
- Editions: 23
- Location: Wemyss Bay, Renfrewshire, Scotland
- Venue: Castle Wemyss
- Surface: Grass

The Wemyss Bay Tennis Tournament was a men's and women's tennis that featured a series of four tennis events all usually played in August each year at the same venue The tournament/s were all organised by the Inverkip Rovers Lawn Tennis Club, that was staged them annually on the tennis courts at Castle Wemyss, Wemyss Bay, Wemyss Bay, Renfrewshire, Scotland.

The events played during the month were Inverkip Rovers LTC Tournament (1882-1886), the Inverkip Rovers Open (1885-1889) the Castle Wemyss Open. (1890-1905) and the Inverkip Rovers Closed Championships (1882-1888).

== History ==
Castle Wemyss was a large mansion in Wemyss Bay, Scotland. It stood on the southern shore of the Firth of Clyde at Wemyss Point, where the firth turns southwards. In August 1882 the Inverkip Rovers Lawn Tennis club began to organise a series of tennis events staged the event annually on the Castle Wemyss Courts at Castle Wemyss, Wemyss Bay, Renfrewshire, Scotland as part of the Wemyss Bay Tennis Tournament.

These tournament were all played during the month of August. That year it established the Inverkip Rovers LTC Tournament. The same year the club also organised a closed championship event called the Inverkip Rovers Closed Championships that was only open to club members only.

In 1885 it create a new open tournament the Inverkip Rovers Open that was staged the event annually on the Castle Wemyss Courts until 1889. In 1890 the club established another new tournament for men Castle Wemyss Open - Castle Wemyss Cup. That event was also open featuring mixed doubles for women. In 1905 the Wemyss Bay Tennis Tournament was discontinued after 23 years.

== Finals ==
=== Inverkip Rovers Closed Championships ===
(Open to club members only).

Year	Winner	Runner-up	Score
1882	(Scotland) Horatio Renaud Babington Peile	?	?.
1883	(Scotland) George Arbuthnot Burns	(Scotland) Horatio R. Babington Peile	5-6 3-6 6-3 6-5 6-5.
1884	(Scotland) Horatio R. Babington Peile (2)	(Scotland) D.M. Hannay	3 sets to 2.
1885	(England) Charles H. J. Higginbotham	(Scotland) D.M. Hannay	2 sets to 1.
1886	(England) Charles H. J. Higginbotham (2)	(Wales) G.H. Aitken	7-5 6-4 0-6 6-4.
1887	(Scotland) Archibald Thomson	(England) Henry Guy Nadin	w.o.
1888	(Scotland) Horatio R. Babington Peile (3)	(England) J.C. Burns	4-6 6-3 6-3.

=== Inverkip Rovers LTC Tournament ===
Men's singles.

Year	Winner	Runner-up	Score
1882	(Scotland) Horatio Renaud Babington Peile	(Scotland) George Nelson Stenhouse	6-1, 6-2 .
1883	(Scotland) George Arbuthnot Burns	(England) James Locke	3-6 6-3 9-7 6-2.
1884	(Scotland) Horatio Renaud Babington Peile (2)	(Scotland) Richard Millar Watson	6-0, 6-3, 6-8. 6-8, 6-3.
1886	(Scotland) Richard Millar Watson	(Scotland) Forrester John Thomson	7-5 6-1 6-3

=== Inverkip Rovers Open ===
Men's singles.

Year	Winner	Runner-up	Score
1885	(England) Charles H. J. Higginbotham	?	?.
1886	(England) Charles H. J. Higginbotham (2)	(United Kingdom) Edward Mortimer Shand	7–5, 6–4, 0–6, 6-4 .
1887	(Scotland) Archibald Thomson	(England) Henry Guy Nadin	w.o..
1888	(Scotland) Richard Millar Watson	(England) Henry Guy Nadin	0-6, 6-4, 6-3, 6-1
1889	(United States) Louis J. Grant	(Scotland) Richard Millar Watson	w.o.

Men's Doubles

(Incomplete roll)

Year	Winner	Runner-up	Score
1886	(England) Charles H. J. Higginbotham (Scotland) D.M. Hannay	(Scotland) Walter R. Baines Latham (Scotland) T.F. Donald	5-6, 3-6, 6-3, 6-5, 6-4.

Mixed Doubles

(Incomplete roll)

Year	Winner	Runner-up	Score
1886	(United Kingdom) G.H. Aitken (Scotland) Miss Macquisten	(Scotland) D.M. Hannay (Scotland) Mrs Macquisten	3-6, 6-3, 6-3.

=== Castle Wemyss Open ===
Castle Wemyss Cup.

Year	Winner	Runner-up	Score
1890	(United Kingdom) G. Scott-Jackson	?	?.
1891	(Scotland) Richard Millar Watson	(United Kingdom) Edward Mortimer Shand	7–5, 6–4, 0–6, 6-4 .
1892	(England) Henry Guy Nadin	(United States) Howard Augustus Taylor	?.
1893	(Ireland) Gerald Peacocke	(England) Arthur Knox Cronin	6–2, 6–4, 9-7.
1894	(Ireland) Gerald Peacocke (2)	(England) Henry Guy Nadin	4–6, 10–8, 6–0, 6-3 .
1895	(England) Kenneth Ramsden Marley	(Ireland) Gerald Peacocke (3)	6–4, 7–5, 7-5 .
1898	(Ireland) Gerald Peacocke (4)	(England) George Lawrence Orme	w.o.
1899	(Ireland) Gerald Peacocke (5)	(Ireland) James Anthony Traill	6–4, 0–6, 6–2.
1905	(England) Reginald Doherty	(Ireland) James Anthony Traill	6–2, 6–3, 5–7, 6-3.
