= West Teviotdale Open =

Defunct tennis tournament
- Tour: Roxburghshire LTA Circuit
- Founded: 1883; 143 years ago
- Abolished: 1889; 137 years ago
- Location: Hawick, Teviotdale, Roxburghshire, Scotland.
- Venue: Hawick Cricket Ground
- Surface: Grass

The West Teviotdale Open or West Teviotdale (Hawick) Open was a late Victorian era men's and women's grass court tennis tournament played at the Hawick Cricket Ground, Hawick, Teviotdale, Roxburghshire, Scotland The tournament was first staged in August 1883. It was held annually as an all comers open event until 1889.

== History ==
The West Tevioutdale Open was a grass court tennis tournament established in 1883 at Hawick, Teviotdale, Roxburghshire, Scotland. The tournament was staged annually through till 1887 when it was discontinued. The tournament featured both Scottish and English National Champions.

== Finals ==
=== Men's Singles ===
| Year | Winner | Runner-up | Score |
|---|---|---|---|
| 1883 | (Scotland) Alfred Aitken Thomson | (Scotland) George Nelson Stenhouse | 6–1, 6–2 . |
| 1884 | (Scotland) Joseph Constable Maxwell-Scott | (England) James Locke | 3–6 6–3 9–7 6–2. |
| 1885 | (Scotland) George Nelson Stenhouse | (Scotland) Richard Millar Watson | 6–0, 6–3, 6–8. 6–8, 6–3. |
| 1886 | (Scotland) Richard Millar Watson | (Scotland) Forrester John Thomson | 7–5 6–1 6–3. |

=== Men's doubles ===
(Incomplete roll)

| Year | Winner | Runner-up | Score |
|---|---|---|---|
| 1883 | (Scotland) Alfred Aitken Thomson (Scotland) Forrester John Thomson | (Scotland) Joseph Constable Maxwell-Scott (Scotland) Charles Constable Maxwell-Stuart | 6–3, 6–5, 6–2. |
| 1884 | (Scotland) Patrick Bowes-Lyon (Scotland) Herbert Bowes-Lyon | (United Kingdom) A. Sellar (United Kingdom) W. Thomson | 6–1, 6–2, 6–2. |
| 1885 | (Scotland) George Nelson Stenhouse (Scotland) Richard Millar Watson | (Scotland) Alfred Aitken Thomson (Scotland) Forrester John Thomson | 8–6 6–4 6–3. |

=== Mixed doubles ===
(Incomplete roll)

| Year | Winner | Runner-up | Score |
|---|---|---|---|
| 1883 | (United Kingdom) James Locke (Scotland) Miss Stuart | (Scotland) C.E. Stewart (United Kingdom) Miss Cliff | 6–2, 3–6, 6–4. |
| 1884 | (Scotland) S.B. Murray (Scotland) Miss Murray | (United Kingdom) Mr. Carter (United Kingdom) Miss Stewart | 6–1, 6–3. |
| 1885 | (Scotland) Alfred Aitken Thomson (England) Miss Annie Dod | (United Kingdom) Mr. S.C. Knott (United Kingdom) Miss Knott | 6–3, 4–6, 3–2 ret. |

== See also ==
- Tennis in Scotland
