= Mossilee =

Cricket ground in Galashiels, Scotland

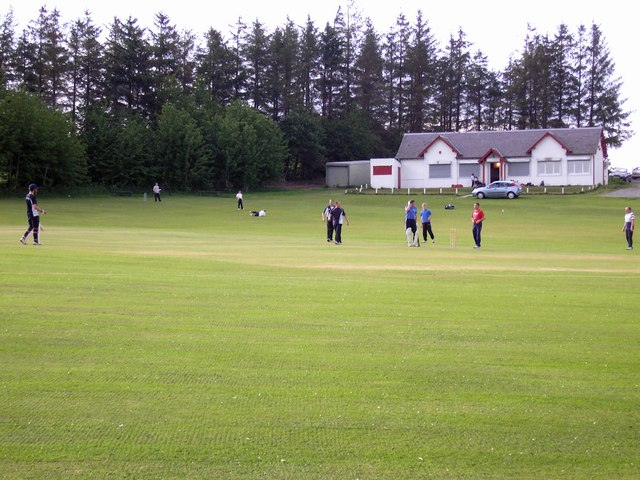
- Interactive map of Mossilee

Ground information
- Location: Galashiels, Scotland
- Country: Scotland
- Coordinates: 55.6191°N 2.8261°W
- Establishment: c. 1899

Team information
Scotland	(1911)
- As of 19 October 2011; Source: Ground profile

Mossilee is a cricket ground in Galashiels, Scotland. Established prior to 1899, the first recorded match held on the ground was a first-class match between Scotland and the touring Indians in 1911. The three-day match between the sides ended in a draw. The only other recorded match held on the ground came in 1927 when the South of Scotland played the touring New Zealanders. The ground is still in use to this day. The club have won the borders T20 league three years running.
