= Paddle tennis =

Paddle sport

POP Tennis
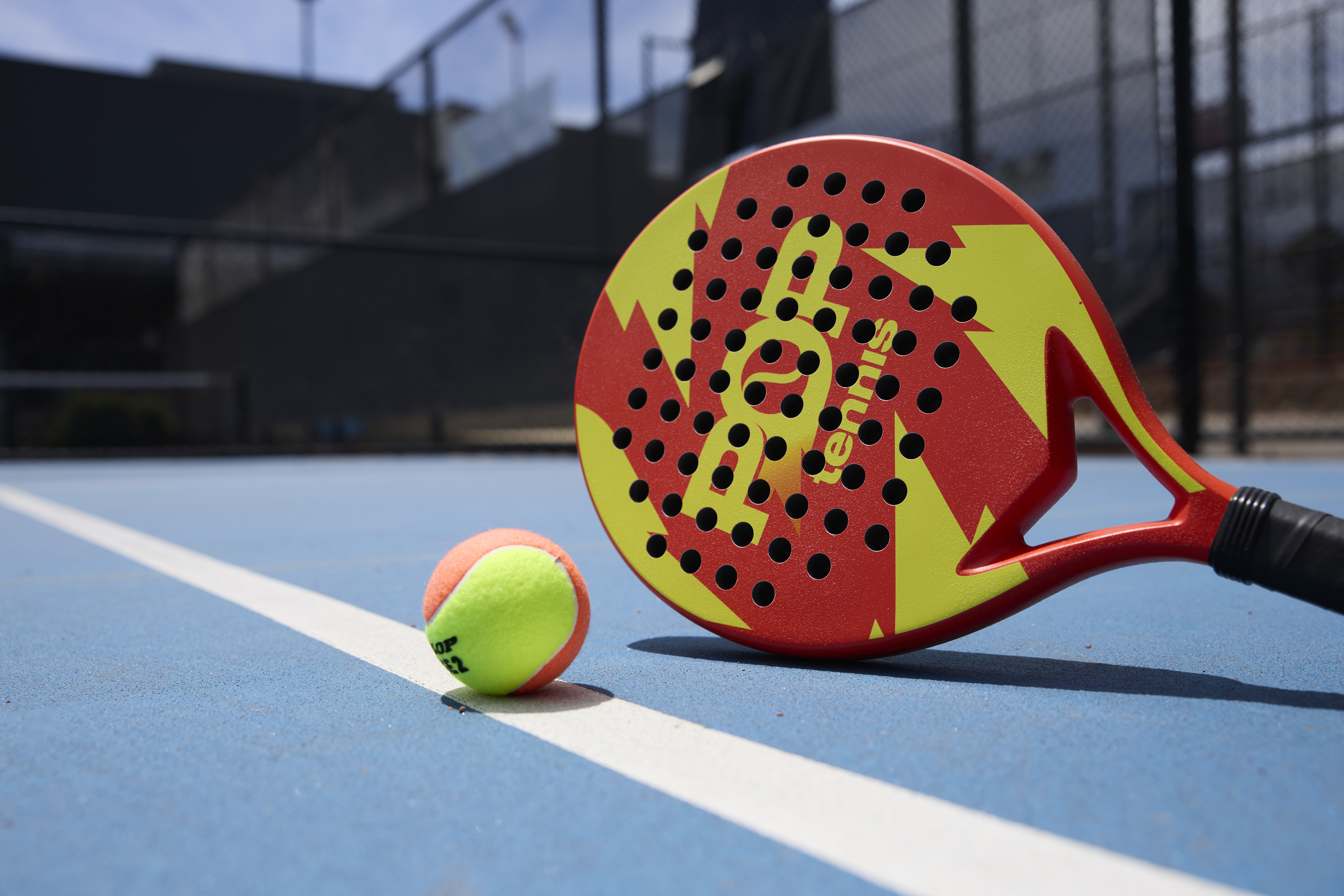
- First played: 1898 in Albion, Michigan, United States

Characteristics
- Contact: No
- Team members: Singles or doubles
- Mixed-sex: Yes, separate singles, doubles, & mixed doubles
- Type: paddle sport
- Equipment: Reduced-pressure tennis ball, paddle, net
- Venue: Outdoor or indoor

Presence
- Olympic: No
- Paralympic: No
- World Games: No

Paddle tennis (branded as POP Tennis since 2015) is a racquet sport adapted from tennis and played for over a century. Compared to tennis, the court is smaller, has no doubles lanes, and the net is lower. POP tennis is played with a solid perforated paddle, as opposed to a strung racquet, and a lower compression tennis ball. The same court is used for both singles and doubles, with doubles being the dominant and more popular form of play. The smaller court size adds a strong emphasis and advantage to net play and allows for a fast, reaction-based game.

== History ==
In 1898, paddle tennis was invented by Episcopal minister Frank Peer Beal in Albion, Michigan. Afterwards, the sport spread in lower Manhattan where Beal wanted to create recreational activities for neighborhood children. In 1915, Beal got the Manhattan parks and recreation department to lay courts in Washington Square Park in Greenwich Village. The first tournament was held in 1922. The United States Paddle Tennis Association (USPTA) was formed the following year. (The United States Paddle Tennis Association is not to be confused with the United States Professional Tennis Association founded in 1970.) By 1941, paddle tennis was being played in almost 500 American cities.

Although Beal is known as the game's inventor, Murray Geller, a player in the 1940s and 1950s, was instrumental in creating the modern game. Elected chairman of the USPTA rules committee, he wanted to make a game that was more appealing to adults. To do so, he instituted features including an enlarged court and an underhanded serve.

Scott Freedman won the World's Men's Singles Paddle Tennis Championships 19 times, the World Men's Doubles Championships 16 times, and the World Mixed Doubles 14 times. He wrote a book titled Paddle Tennis and Tennis: Anyone Can Play.

In 2015 and 2016, the USPTA rebranded the sport as "POP Tennis" and changed its name to the International POP Tennis Association (IPTA) to enhance its marketability and distinguish it from similar paddle-based sports, such as Padel and Platform Tennis, which are also frequently referred to as 'Paddle' or 'Paddle Tennis'. The name was chosen in reference to the "pop" sound made when the paddle hits the ball.

== Rules ==
Paddle tennis courts are constructed of the same materials as tennis court, but can also be placed on hard beach sand. The court measures 50 feet (15.24m) baseline-to-baseline and 20 feet (6.09 m) across, with the service line 3 feet (0.91 m) in from the baseline. This creates a service box of 10 × 22 feet (3.04 × 6.70 m). The net is placed at a height of 31 inches (0.78 m).

POP Tennis follows a simplified set of rules that distinguish it from traditional tennis. Players are permitted only one underarm serve per point, with serves alternating between the deuce and ad courts from behind the baseline. The serve must land in the diagonally opposite service box. Scoring mirrors traditional tennis, with sets played using tiebreak formats and advantage scoring within each game (e.g., 15, 30, 40, Advantage, Game).

== Summary ==
- Players: Four, played in a doubles format.
- Serves: Serves must be underhand. A second serve is allowed only in the event of a net ball that lands in bounds, as in tennis.
- Score: Scoring method is the same as in tennis. Matches are best of five sets.
- Ball: Tennis ball with reduced pressure.
- Paddle: Solid with no strings. May be perforated.
- Court: There are two styles of courts. East and West coast styles.
- Walls: Walls or fences play the same role as in tennis, once the ball comes in contact with either the point is over.

== Similar sports ==
Padel is a similar sport typically played in doubles on an enclosed court about half the size of a tennis court. It is popular in Spain, South Africa and Hispanic America.

== See also ==
- Beach tennis, played on sand without allowing the ball to hit the ground
- Pickleball
- Padel
- Lacrosse
