= Richard Millar Watson =

Scottish tennis player

Richard Thomson
- Full name: Richard Millar Thomson
- Country (sports): Scotland
- Born: 19 March 1860 Edinburgh, Scotland
- Died: 23 February 1925 (aged 64) Edinburgh, Scotland
- Turned pro: 1882 (amateur)
- Retired: 1907

Singles
- Career record: 134–63 (68%)
- Career titles: 12

Richard Millar Thomson (19 March 1860 – 23 February 1925) was a Scottish tennis player. In major tournaments of the 19th century he was a quarter finalist in singles at the 1890 Irish Championships. He also won the Scottish National Championships in 1894.

== Career ==
Thomson was born In Edinburgh, Scotland in 1860. He played his first tournament at the South of Scotland Championships in Moffat in 1882 where he reached the quarter finals. He won his first title at the West Teviotdale Open in Hawick in 1886.

In 1893 at the sixth attempt he reached the challenge round final of the Scottish Championships, but was beaten by defending champion the Englishman Arthur Gore. In 1894 avenged his defeat of the previous years loss when won the Scottish Championships against reigning two time title holder Arthur Gore.

His main career singles title successes came at the South of Scotland Championships which he won two times (1891, 1893), he also won the Inverkip Rovers Open (1888), the Castle Wemyss Cup as the men's event as part of the Castle Wemyss Open (1891), the North of Scotland Championships (1892), and the Whitehouse Open (1894).

In addition he was a losing finalist at the East of Scotland Championships three times (1888 1891–1892), Galashiels Championship (1887), and the West of Scotland Championships (1894). Thomson played his final singles event at the Northumberland Championships in 1907.

== Career singles (34) ==
=== Titles (12) ===
- 1886 - Inverkip Rovers LTC Tournament
- 1886 - West Teviotdale Open
- 1888 - Inverkip Rovers Open
- 1890 - East of Scotland Championships
- 1891 - Castle Wemyss Cup
- 1891 - Inverkip Rovers LTC Tournament
- 1891 - South of Scotland Championships
- 1892 - North of Scotland Championships
- 1892 - South of Scotland Championships
- 1893 - South of Scotland Championships
- 1894 - Scottish Championships
- 1894 - Whitehouse Open

=== Runner-Up (22) ===
- 1885 - West Teviotdale Open
- 1887 - Galashiels Championship
- 1887 - South of Scotland Championships
- 1887 - Whitehouse Open
- 1888 - East of Scotland Championships
- 1889 - Inverkip Rovers Open
- 1889 - South of Scotland Championships
- 1890 - Scottish Championships
- 1890 - South of Scotland Championships
- 1891 - East of Scotland Championships
- 1892- East of Scotland Championships
- 1892 - Pollokshields Open
- 1892 - Inverkip Rovers LTC Tournament
- 1892 - Castle Wemyss Cup
- 1892 - East of Scotland Championships
- 1892 - Scottish Championships
- 1893 - Scottish Championships
- 1894 - West of Scotland Championships
- 1894 - Pollokshields Open
- 1894 - South of Scotland Championships
- 1895 - Whitehouse Open
- 1895 - Scottish Championships
