= Deck tennis =

Sport played on a large boat

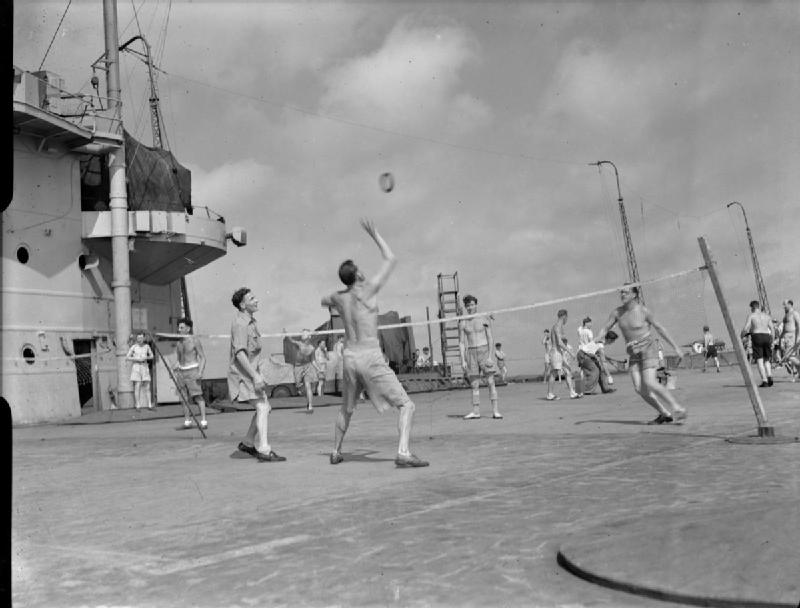
Men playing deck tennis aboard HMS Indomitable during World War II

Deck tennis is a sport that is played by mariners on the decks of both cargo and passenger vessels. The sport is a hybrid between tennis and quoits, and is played with either the rubber disk or ring, or a similarly-sized rope ring. The sport has been standardized and formalized in several countries under names such as "tennikoit" or "ring tennis".

American sources from the 1930s and 1940s attribute the origin, or at least formal establishment of the game, to Cleve F. Schaffer. In 1981, Mariano Herrera and Alejandro Nougues from Argentina won the first and only Deck Tennis World Championship celebrated on the beach in Punta del Este, Uruguay.

== Rules ==
Most games of deck tennis, unlike the official tennikoit form, are informal and without set rules or a governing body, so rules tend to vary. Usually it is played on a court roughly 40 to 50 feet (11 to 14 m) long and 15 to 20 feet (5 to 7 m) wide and may be played as either as singles or doubles. The midcourt net is usually the height, or higher than that of a tennis net. The goal of the game is to serve (throw) the ring into the opponent's court, and the opponent tries to catch it before it falls and immediately throw it back from the same position where it was caught, with a point being scored when the server managed to land a quoit on the opponent's side of the court.

The scoring system is commonly the same as regular tennis: Love, 15, 30, 40, Deuce, Advantage, Game. This is in contrast with tennikoit, where sets are played to 21 individual points, similar to badminton.

== In popular culture ==
In the 1936 film Piccadilly Jim, Robert Montgomery as "Piccadilly Jim" is depicted playing the game with his romantic rival in the film Ralph Forbes as "Lord Frederick Priory" on the deck of an ocean liner.

In Roald Dahl's autobiography, Boy: Tales of Childhood (1984), he describes a game of deck tennis that he played.
