= East of Scotland Championships =

Defunct tennis tournament
- Event name: TSB East of Scotland Tennis Championships
- Tour: ILTF
- Founded: 1887; 139 years ago
- Abolished: 1978; 48 years ago
- Location: St Andrews; Edinburgh
- Surface: Clay; Grass

The East of Scotland Championships, later known as the TSB East of Scotland Tennis Championships for sponsorship reasons, was a combined men's and women's grass court then later clay court combined men's and women's tennis tournament first established in 1887, and held at St Andrews, Fife, Scotland until 1903. In 1904 they moved to Edinburgh, Scotland until 1989 when they were discontinued.

== History ==
In 1885 a Fifeshire Tennis Tournament was established at St. Andrews University and played on the College Grounds. This tournament became known as the East of Scotland Championships in 1887 and played at the St. Andrews Lawn Tennis Club, St Andrews, Fife, Scotland. The championships were initially played on grass courts till around 1903. In 1904 the championships were moved to Liberton Lawn Tennis Club, Liberton, Edinburgh which had clay courts, this would remain the championships venue until 1973 when the tennis club closed. In 1974 it was moved to Craiglockhart for the duration of its run in 1989 when it was discontinued.

The championships were sponsored by TSB Bank from 1983 to 1989, and were known as the TSB East of Scotland Tennis Championships.

== Event name ==
- East of Scotland Championships (1887–1969)
- East of Scotland Open Tennis Championships (1970–1982)
- TSB East of Scotland Tennis Championships (1983–1989)

== See also ==
- Tennis in Scotland
