= Padel =

Racquet sport

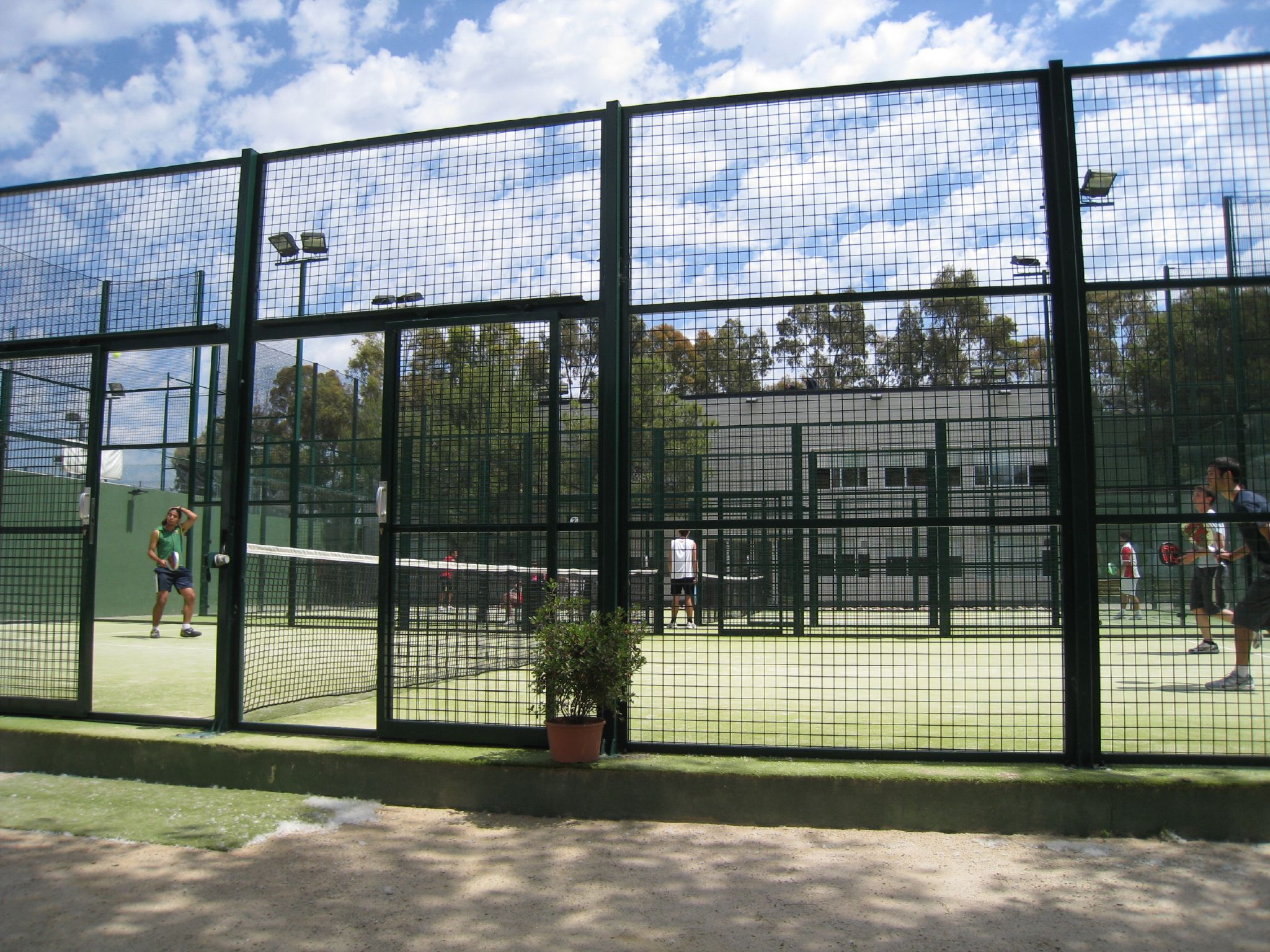
- Padel players on outdoor padel courts
- Highest governing body: International Padel Federation (FIP)
- Nicknames: Paddle (US, Canada)
- First played: 1968, Acapulco, Mexico

Characteristics
- Contact: No
- Team members: Usually doubles
- Mixed-sex: Separate competitions (mixed sometimes in leagues)
- Type: Racquet sport
- Equipment: Padel racquet, padel ball
- Venue: Outdoor or indoor padel court

Presence
- Country or region: Worldwide
- Olympic: No
- Paralympic: No

Padel (Spanish: pádel) is a racquet sport that combines elements of tennis and squash. It is usually played in doubles (2 vs 2) on a small enclosed court with glass and mesh walls that are part of the game. It has the same scoring system as tennis, but adapted rules, e.g. regarding the use of the walls and fences or the nature of the rackets (which are solid (without strings) and perforated). Balls can be played off the court walls, similar to squash. A serve must be played as an under-arm serve which is hit at or below the waist level. Padel originated in Mexico in 1969. It became popular in Spain and Latin American countries such as Argentina, Uruguay, Brazil, Colombia, and Paraguay.

As of 2025, there were more than 35 million active players in more than 150 countries, according to the International Padel Federation (FIP). In 2023, the global padel market was valued at approximately €2 billion. Since 1992, the Padel World Championship has been held every two years, and each final has featured Argentina alongside either Spain or Brazil in both the male and female tournaments.

== History ==
The sport was invented in 1969 in Acapulco, Mexico, by Enrique Corcuera, after he modified his squash court to incorporate elements of platform tennis. Initially, he called it "Padel Corcuera". In the beginning, courts used concrete walls and surfaces, which obscured visibility for spectators. To improve the viewing experience and gameplay, these were eventually replaced by glass walls and artificial turf.

Corcuera had many friends who came to visit him, trying out the new sport he had invented, amongst them Frank Sinatra and Henry Kissinger. One of his friends was Alfonso of Hohenlohe-Langenburg, who learned about padel visiting Corcuera in Acapulco. Returning to Spain, he built the first two courts in Marbella at the Marbella Club Hotel in 1974. Given the exclusivity of the resort, the sport initially turned into a jet-set pastime. From here, the sport was imported into Argentina by Julio Menditeguy and it took off quickly to become one of the country's most exercised sports.

Some professional padel players have previously competed in tennis, including former WTA Tour players Roberta Vinci and Lara Arruabarrena. In most countries other than Spain and Argentina, padel remained a niche sport for decades but its popularity soared during the COVID-19 pandemic as it could be played outdoors and did not involve physical contact. Also, the international padel federation and Qatar reached an agreement that led to investments by Qatar Sports Investments into the sport and which created a unified global professional tour called Premier Padel.

Padel was included in the 2023 European Games in Kraków, Poland, and nearby. The International Padel Federation (FIP) plans to have 75 national federations for padel to become an Olympic sport for the 2032 Summer Olympics in Brisbane, Australia. Three padel courts can typically fit within the area of a standard tennis court; consequently, many clubs are converting facilities to accommodate a higher density of players. In the United States, padel courts cost between $60,000 and $80,000 to build. In 2023, Deloitte projected the number of padel courts potentially would reach 84,000 by 2026.

== Rules ==
- Players: Doubles is the most common format. The International Padel Federation rules do not explicitly state that padel is a doubles game, but 'pairs' of players are mentioned throughout.
- Serves: Serves are hit underarm after a bounce; the ball is hit at or below waist level with at least one foot on the ground. The ball must bounce within or on the lines of the diagonal service box. Serves which hit the walls after bouncing on the opposite ground are still in play. However, a service is considered a "fault" if the ball touches the wire fence before the second bounce. If the ball hits the net or net post and then lands in (as described above), it is a let and is replayed. The server gets two tries; i.e., if the first serve is a fault, the server gets a second serve. A second fault ("double fault") results in a loss of the point.
- Return of serve: The returner must allow the ball to bounce on the ground before it is hit. Otherwise, the return follows the same rules as a rally ball.
- Rally ball: Hit the ball from your side to your opponents' side of the court. You can hit the ball on the fly (volley), or after it bounces once on the ground, or after it bounces on the ground and then off one or more walls or fences on your side of the court. You lose the point for any of the following "faults": your shot bounces first on the ground or touches the fence on your side of the court; or your shot hits the fence or walls on your opponents' side of the court before bouncing on the ground on your opponents' side of the court (i.e., the ball would have flown "out" if not for the wall or fence). The ball may touch the net or net post. You may hit the ball into the walls on your side (but not the fences) as long as the ricochet ball then lands in your opponents' court without fault, as described above; the ricochet shot is only allowed after the ball has bounced on the ground (not as a volley).
- Point over: The ball is no longer in play when there is a fault, or a player fails to hit the ball before the second bounce on the ground. A point is awarded to the opponent(s) of the player(s) who failed to keep the ball in play. (As described above, the server is allowed one service fault.) See below for scoring.
- Balls: Padel balls are similar to tennis balls but are slightly smaller and have less pressure. Official regulations mandate that the balls must be uniform in color, strictly limited to yellow or white.
- Rackets: Padel rackets are made of a composite material without strings. The striking surface is usually perforated by cylindrical holes measuring between 9 and 13 millimetres in diameter. The racket is similar to the one used in platform tennis but has its own specifications. The handle must feature a non-elastic safety cord with a maximum length of 35 centimetres (14 in), which is mandatory to wear around the wrist during play.
- Court: The court has a floor made of concrete, plastic, or artificial grass. It is similar to a tennis court, only smaller, measuring 10 by 20 metres, with a 0.88-metre-high (35 in) net in the middle. The court is surrounded by 3- to 4-metre high walls made of glass or brick as well as fences.

=== Scoring ===
Padel uses the tennis scoring system with an optional exception of a "golden point" similar to "no-advantage" scoring used in some tennis doubles and exhibition matches. The golden point is used to determine a winner when the score reaches deuce once or more often during any game. The team which wins this point wins the game. The receiving team chooses whether the golden point service will come from the right or left of the court. Golden point was introduced in the 2020 World Padel Tour for the main tournaments (Master Final, Master, Open, and Challenger). Since the 2026 season, it is also used in the Premier Padel tour which succeeded the World Padel Tour. Some tournaments did not implement this rule or later reverted to standard advantage scoring.

=== Court ===
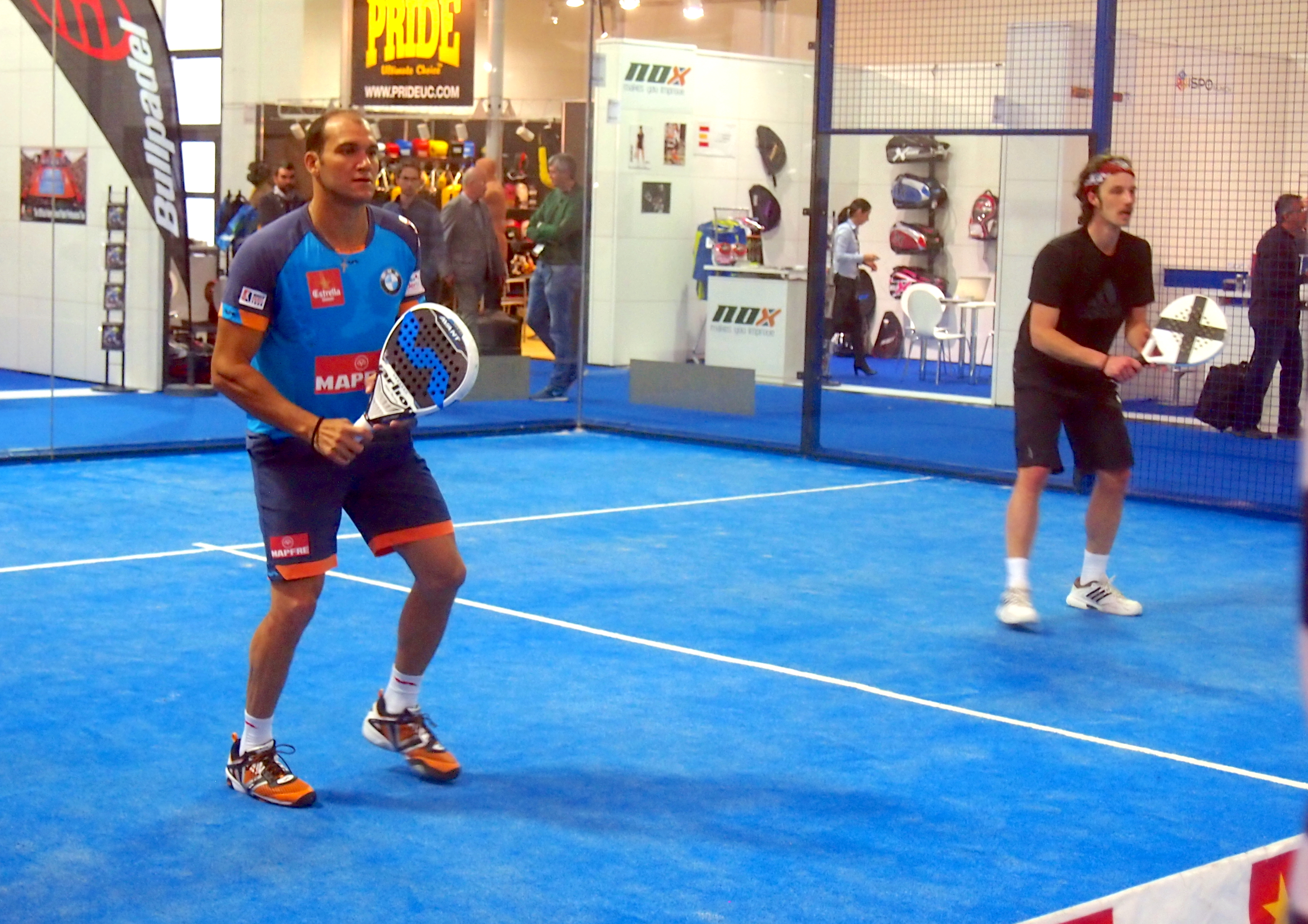
Padel competition at ISPO 2014 in Munich, Germany

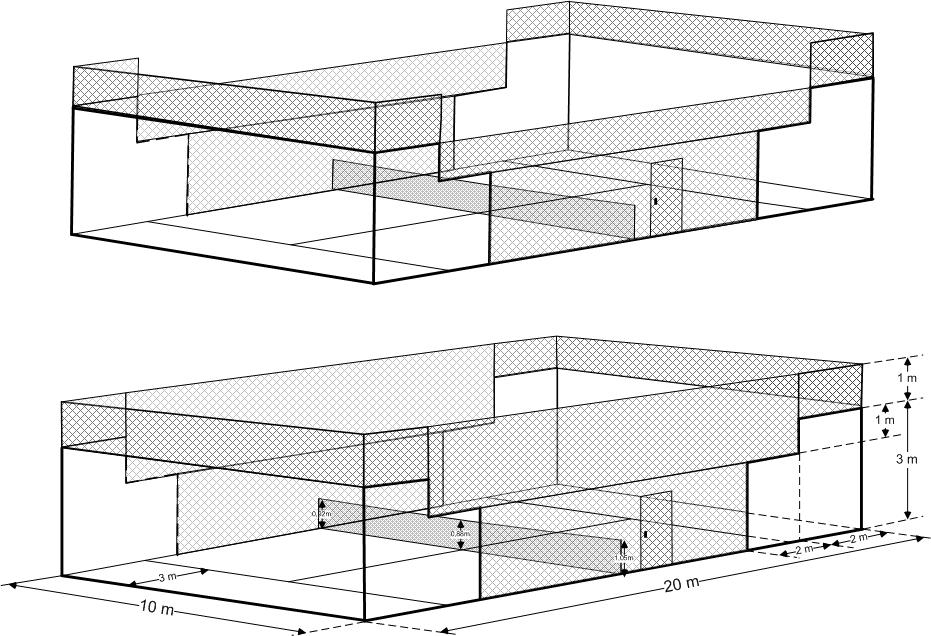
Padel court dimensions

The playing field is a rectangle 10 metres (32 ft 10 in) wide (back wall) and 20 metres (65 ft 7 in) long (side wall) (with a 0.5% tolerance), enclosed by walls. The net divides the court into two equal halves, measuring 88 centimetres (35 in) in height at the centre and 92 centimetres (36 in) at the ends (with a 0.5 centimetres (0.20 in) tolerance). No mention is made in the International Padel Federation rules of a singles version of the game, and no alternative court size is given. However, a 6-by-20-metre (20 ft × 66 ft) court is sometimes provided for singles.

The superstructure is made from connecting 3 m-high, 2 m-wide panels, with an additional 1 m mesh height over the glass back walls (10 m walls). This additional 1-metre height extends 2 metres along the side walls from each corner. Consequently, the back walls and service corners reach a total height of 4 metres, while the remaining side walls stand at 3 metres.

Glass panels are usually used for the back walls and the adjacent corner side sections, while metal mesh panels constitute the remainder of the sides. The service lines are positioned 3 metres (9.8 ft) from the back wall, while a central service line bisects the area into two equal service boxes. All lines have a 5 cm (2 in) width and are clearly visible. The minimum clear height is 6 metres (20 ft) above the playing surface, which must remain free of any obstacles such as lighting equipment or ceiling structures.

== Adoption ==
=== Europe ===
The Padel Pro Tour (PPT) was the professional padel circuit created in 2005 as a result of the agreement between a group of organisers of padel matches and the Association of Professional Players of Padel (AJPP) and the Spanish Feminine Association of Pádel (AFEP). In 2013 the World Padel Tour (WPT) was founded with the approval of the AJPP, whereas the PPT was shut down. The WPT was based in Spain but included tournaments in other European countries as well as Argentina, Brazil, and the United Arab Emirates.

In 2022, Premier Padel was founded in a partnership between the International Padel Federation and Qatar Sports Investments. In August 2023, Qatar Sports Investments acquired the World Padel Tour. This agreement unified the two rival tours into a single global circuit under the Premier Padel brand, effective from the 2024 season. Despite padel's origins in Spanish-speaking countries, the number of padel players and clubs in the northern part of Europe is growing. Due to climatic conditions, Northern European nations such as Finland, Denmark, the Netherlands, and Norway primarily utilize indoor facilities. Conversely, outdoor or semi-covered courts are more common in Central and Southern European countries like Belgium, Italy, and France.

In Spain, Sweden, and Portugal there are more people playing padel than tennis. According to the Playtomic Global Padel Report 2025, around 3,200 clubs were formed in 2024.

==== Spain ====
Padel is the second most popular participation sport in Spain behind association football. As of 2025, there were more than 6 million players in Spain and around 17,000 courts. In October 2023, the Daily Mail and General Trust (DMGT) invested in the Hexagon Cup, a Madrid-based padel competition involving six franchise teams owned by celebrities.

==== Sweden ====
The Swedish Padel Association (Svenska Padelförbundet) was included as a member of the Swedish Sports Confederation in 2021. The number of courts in Sweden grew from 560 in 2019 to more than 4,000 in 2022, exceeding demand at some point. From August 2022 to August 2023, over 120 Swedish padel courts went bankrupt due to market saturation, according to SVT.

==== France ====
France has emerged as a key growth market for padel in Europe, where the sport is officially managed by the French Tennis Federation (FFT). As of 2025, the country is estimated to have 800,000 players and 4,000 courts in 2025. The player base is predominantly male, typically aged between 30 and 50, with many having a background in tennis.

==== United Kingdom ====
The sport's popularity along the Costa del Sol in southern Spain and the Algarve in southern Portugal has exposed it to a large number of British visitors, leading to an increased popularity of the sport in the UK and a launch of the UK Padel Federation in 2011. Padel is competing with tennis and squash, whose popularity is declining.

As of 2023, according to the Lawn Tennis Association, the sport's governing body in the UK, there were 90,000 padel players in the country, compared with 915,000 tennis players. By 2025, the Lawn Tennis Association said that there were 1,000 padel courts open across 325 venues in the UK, up from only 68 in 2019.

As of 2025 the UK had a total of 1,553 padel courts across 559 venues, with over 860,000 people playing padel at least once.

==== Ukraine ====
Padel has grown rapidly in Ukraine despite the ongoing war, expanding from around 14 courts in 2022 to an estimated 150–200 by early 2026, with the Ukrainian Padel Federation projecting more than 300 courts by the end of 2026. Several high-profile clubs have opened in Kyiv, including Svito Padel Club, co-founded by tennis players Elina Svitolina and Sergiy Stakhovsky, and Lisnyky Padel Club, backed by ATB co-owner Gennadiy Butkevych. According to the World Padel Network's 2026 search report, Ukrainian search interest in padel rose approximately 280% year-on-year.

=== North America ===
The US Padel Association was founded in Chattanooga, Tennessee in 1993, and opened two courts in the Chattanooga area. The American Padel Association was formed in 1995 and built its first courts at a private club in Houston for exhibition games. As of 2022, there were 180 padel courts in the U.S., and according to an interactive Google Map, built by the U.S.-focused website Padel Nation, there are now over 1,000 courts at more than 220 padel clubs around the U.S. as of January 2026. The A1 Padel tour is based in the US. The US Padel Association forecasts there may be 30,000 courts in the U.S. by 2030.

=== Asia ===
In Aug 2013, the Swiss Club in Singapore opened the first padel court in Singapore, making it the first in Asia. Since 2022, Indonesia—particularly Bali—has experienced rapid growth in padel infrastructure, driven by high participation from locals, expatriates, and tourists. Jungle Padel is one of Bali's earliest leading clubs, with branches in Canggu and Ubud. However, the pace of this expansion has led some to question its long-term sustainability, suggesting a future need to prioritize facility quality over quantity.

In 2025, Dezhou City, Shandong Province, China hosted an international padel championship. This event marked the beginning of China's hosting of padel competitions, and Dezhou has since become a major padel tournament city in China.

Padel was selected as an official event for the 2026 Nagoya Asian Games.

==== South Asia ====
In Islamabad, the sport has expanded with the establishment of private facilities, as well as public initiatives including the auction of five padel court sites by the Capital Development Authority (CDA) for commercial development.

==== Middle East ====
In the Gulf countries, the number of courts soared from 20 in 2016 to more than 2,700 in 2025, mostly in Saudi-Arabia, the United Arab Emirates, Kuwait, Qatar, and Oman.

=== Oceania ===
Uptake of padel in Oceania has been limited. In January, 2016, the first padel courts in Oceania were opened in Sydney.

==== Australia ====
As of April 2026 there are 23 registered padel clubs in Australia with are approximately 100 courts in total. This includes: four clubs each of the cities of Sydney, Melbourne, and Perth; one in each of Adelaide, Brisbane, Canberra, the Gold Coast, Albury, and Coffs Harbour. The governing body is Padel Australia.

Padel has also been supported by Tennis Australia which aims to grow its popularity. At the 2022 Australian Open Tennis Grand Slam tournament a pop-up padel court was erected for public access and exhibition games, while in 2023 the first "Australian Padel Open" was held alongside the Australian Open tennis near to the tennis centre court at Rod Laver Arena.

==== New Zealand ====
The first padel court in New Zealand was opened in October, 2023, with a single court in Auckland at a suburban sporting and tennis club. A court at a second club in Auckland was under construction, with plans for courts in other cities. A national governing body, Padel New Zealand, was established, with plans to run national and international competitions. New Zealand's first indoor padel center, Padel House, has opened in Wellington, offering three doubles and one singles court.

Padel courts in Claremont, Cape Town

=== South Africa ===
The first padel courts in South Africa opened in late 2020 in the Western Cape province. As of 2025, the sport's infrastructure had grown to around 864 courts at 264 venues nationwide.

== Environmental concerns ==
Concerns have arisen in areas where birds have been killed by collision with glass-walled padel courts. Potential solutions include using non-reflective glass (already mandatory in parts of Germany), adding non-reflective film to the glass or hanging nets in front of them.

== Padel vocabulary ==
Most padel vocabulary originates from Spanish, reflecting the sport's established popularity in Spain. However, with rapid growth in regions such as the Middle East and Africa, the vocabulary continues to expand:

- Bajada: When a ball takes a high bounce off the wall and is brought down with an overhand hit
- Bandeja (literal translation: 'tray'): An overhand shot hit with spin rather than power towards the back of the court
- Cadete: A behind-the-back shot
- Chiquita: Similar to a drop shot, trying to force the other team to play the ball below the net line
- Contrapared: A defensive shot where players return the ball via the back wall as a last resort.
- Víbora (literal translation: 'viper'): Similar to the bandeja but hit with more power and spin, typically diagonally down with slice to avoid a high bounce off the walls
- Salida (literal translation: 'exit'): A player running off the court to save a ball that has bounced off the wall and out of the 20 by 10 court. This is usually only seen in professional matches as amateur courts don't provide the necessary space for a salida.

== See also ==
- Paddle tennis
- Padel World Championship
- Pickleball
- Real tennis

== Sources ==
- "Regulations of the Padel Game" (PDF). International Padel Federation (FIP). 28 May 2021. Archived (PDF) from the original on 25 August 2021.
