= Tennis Scotland =

Official governing body of tennis in Scotland

- Sport: Tennis
- Abbreviation: TS
- Founded: 1895
- Location: Airthrey Castle, Hermitage Road, Stirling, FK9 4LA, Scotland
- President: Rhona Alston
- Chairman: Graham Watson
- CEO: Blane Dodds
- Secretary: Barbara Southern

Official website
- www.lta.org.uk/about-us/in-your-area/tennis-scotland/
- (Scotland)

Tennis Scotland is the official governing body of tennis in Scotland. It was founded as the Scottish Lawn Tennis Association (SLTA) in 1895. Tennis Scotland provides support to member clubs and organisations and promotes tennis participation and development. Tennis Scotland is also the governing body for padel in Scotland.

== History ==
The Scottish Lawn Tennis Association (SLTA) was founded in 1895, eight years after the Welsh Lawn Tennis Association (f,1887), and seven years after the Lawn Tennis Association (f.1888). In 1977 Scottish Lawn Tennis Association dropped the word 'Lawn' and became the Scottish Tennis Association (STA). The governing body is currently branded as Tennis Scotland.

== Governance & Structure ==
Tennis Scotland is governed by a board of directors who review, monitor and support the strategic direction of the Organisation via the Chief Executive.

The Board and Chief Executive are responsible for strategy and delivery for Tennis Scotland. Tennis Scotland has an Executive Team which is charged with the day-to-day operation of the business led by Chief Executive Blane Dodds who is also a Trustee on the board of directors.

== Board Of Directors & Honorary President ==
Current as of 2025:

1. Chair Graham Watson
2. Chief Executive Blane Dodds
3. President Rhona Alston
4. Vice President Aidah Isa
5. Non-Executive Director Derek Quirk
6. Non Executive Director Claire Somerset
7. Non Executive Director David Childs
8. Non-Executive Director Anja Vreg
9. Non-Executive Director Michele Mair
10. Non-Executive Director Graeme Gault
11. Non-Executive Director Sean Lineen
12. Company Secretary Barbara Southern
13. Honorary President Dennis D Carmichael OBE

== See also ==
- Tennis in Scotland
- Tennis Wales
- Lawn Tennis Association
