= 1894 in tennis =

This page covers all the important events in the sport of tennis in 1894. It provides the results of notable tournaments throughout the year on both the men's and women's ILTF tennis circuits.

== Australian Open ==
No event.

== French Open ==
Not a Grand Slam event.

== Wimbledon ==
Category	Champion(s)	Finalist(s)	Score
Men's singles	(United Kingdom) Joshua Pim	(United Kingdom) Wilfred Baddeley	10–8, 6–2, 8–6
Women's singles	(United Kingdom) Blanche Hillyard	(United Kingdom) Edith Austin	6–1, 6–1
Men's doubles	(United Kingdom) Herbert Baddeley (United Kingdom) Wilfred Baddeley	(United Kingdom) Harry Barlow (United Kingdom) C. H. Martin	5–7, 7–5, 4–6, 6–3, 8–6

== US Open ==
Category	Champion(s)	Finalist(s)	Score
Men's singles	(United States) Robert Wrenn	(United Kingdom) Manliffe Goodbody	6–8, 6–1, 6–4, 6–4
Women's singles	(United States) Helen Hellwig	(United States) Aline Terry	7–5, 3–6, 6–0, 3–6, 6–3
Men's doubles	(United States) Clarence Hobart (United States) Fred Hovey	(United States) Carr Neel (United States) Sam Neel	6–3, 8–6, 6–1
Women's doubles	(United States) Helen Hellwig (United States) Juliette Atkinson	(United States) Annabella Wistar (United States) Amy Williams	6–4, 8–6, 6–2
Mixed doubles	(United States) Juliette Atkinson (United States) Edwin P. Fischer	(United States) Mrs. McFadden (United States) Gustav Remak	6–3, 6–2, 6–1
