= 1895 in tennis =

This page covers all the important events in the sport of tennis in 1895. It provides the results of notable tournaments throughout the year on both the men's and women's ILTF tennis circuits.

== Australian Open ==
No event.

== French Open ==
Not a Grand Slam event.

== Wimbledon ==
Category	Champion(s)	Finalist(s)	Score
Men's singles	(United Kingdom) Wilfred Baddeley	(United Kingdom) Wilberforce Eaves	4–6, 2–6, 8–6, 6–2, 6–3
Women's singles	(United Kingdom) Charlotte Cooper	(United Kingdom) Helen Jackson	7–5, 8–6
Men's doubles	(United Kingdom) Herbert Baddeley (United Kingdom) Wilfred Baddeley	(United Kingdom) Wilberforce Eaves (United Kingdom) Ernest Lewis	8–6, 5–7, 6–4, 6–3

== US Open ==
Category	Champion(s)	Finalist(s)	Score
Men's singles	(United States) Fred Hovey	(United States) Robert Wrenn	6–3, 6–2, 6–4
Women's singles	(United States) Juliette Atkinson	(United States) Helen Hellwig	6–4, 6–2, 6–1
Men's doubles	(United States) Malcolm Chace (United States) Robert Wrenn	(United States) Clarence Hobart (United States) Fred Hovey	7–5, 6–1, 8–6
Women's doubles	(United States) Helen Hellwig (United States) Juliette Atkinson	(United States) Elisabeth Moore (United States) Amy Williams	6–2, 6–2, 12–10
Mixed doubles	(United States) Juliette Atkinson (United States) Edwin P. Fischer	(United States) Amy Williams (United States) Mantle Fielding	4–6, 8–6, 6–2
