= 1898 in tennis =

This page covers all the important events in the sport of tennis in 1898. It provides the results of notable tournaments throughout the year on both the men's and women's ILTF tennis circuits.

== Australian Open ==
No event.

== French Open ==
Not a Grand Slam event.

== Wimbledon ==
Category	Champion(s)	Finalist(s)	Score
Men's singles	(United Kingdom) Reginald Doherty	(United Kingdom) Laurence Doherty	6–3, 6–3, 2–6, 5–7, 6–1
Women's singles	(United Kingdom) Charlotte Cooper	(United Kingdom) Louisa Martin	6–4, 6–4
Men's doubles	(United Kingdom) Laurence Doherty (United Kingdom) Reginald Doherty	(United States) Clarence Hobart (United Kingdom) Harold Nisbet	6–4, 6–4, 6–2

== US Open ==
Category	Champion(s)	Finalist(s)	Score
Men's singles	(United States) Malcolm Whitman	(United States) Dwight F. Davis	3–6, 6–2, 6–2, 6–1
Women's singles	(United States) Juliette Atkinson	(United States) Marion Jones	6–3, 5–7, 6–4, 2–6, 7–5
Men's doubles	(United States) Leo Ware (United States) George Sheldon	(United States) Holcombe Ward (United States) Dwight Davis	1–6, 7–5, 6–4, 4–6, 7–5
Women's doubles	(United States) Juliette Atkinson (United States) Kathleen Atkinson	(United States) Marie Wimer (United States) Carrie Neely	6–1, 2–6, 4–6, 6–1, 6–2
Mixed doubles	(United States) Carrie Neely (United States) Edwin P. Fischer	(United States) Helen Chapman (United States) J.A. Hill	6–2, 6–4, 8–6
