= 1897 in tennis =

This page covers all the important events in the sport of tennis in 1897. It provides the results of notable tournaments throughout the year on both the men's and women's ILTF tennis circuits.

== Australian Open ==
No event.

== French Open ==
Not a Grand Slam event.

== Wimbledon ==
Category	Champion(s)	Finalist(s)	Score
Men's singles	(United Kingdom) Reginald Doherty	(United Kingdom) Harold Mahony	6–4, 6–4, 6–3
Women's singles	(United Kingdom) Blanche Hillyard	(United Kingdom) Charlotte Cooper	5–7, 7–5, 6–2
Men's doubles	(United Kingdom) Laurence Doherty (United Kingdom) Reginald Doherty	(United Kingdom) Herbert Baddeley (United Kingdom) Wilfred Baddeley	6–4, 4–6, 8–6, 6–4

== US Open ==
Category	Champion(s)	Finalist(s)	Score
Men's singles	(United States) Robert Wrenn	(United Kingdom) Wilberforce Eaves	4–6, 8–6, 6–3, 2–6, 6–2
Women's singles	(United States) Juliette Atkinson	(United States) Elisabeth Moore	6–3, 6–3, 4–6, 3–6, 6–3
Men's doubles	(United States) Leo Ware (United States) George Sheldon	(United Kingdom) Harold Mahony (United Kingdom) Harold Nisbet	11–13, 6–2, 9–7, 1–6, 6–1
Women's doubles	(United States) Juliette Atkinson (United States) Kathleen Atkinson	(United States) Mrs. Edwards (United Kingdom) Elizabeth Rastall	6–2, 6–1, 6–1
Mixed doubles	(United States) Laura Henson (United States) D.L. Magruder	(United States) Maud Banks (United States) B.L.C. Griffith	6–4, 6–3, 7–5
