= Mantle Fielding =

American architect, biographical compiler, and art historian

Mantle Fielding, Jr. (September 30, 1865 – March 27, 1941) was an American architect, art historian, and tennis player.

== Career ==
Fielding was born in Manhattan to Mantle Fielding (1837–1890) and Anne Margaret Stone (maiden; 1838–1906). He graduated from Germantown Academy in 1883 and went on to study architecture at the Boston School of Technology (MIT), reportedly for one year, likely between the fall of 1883 through the spring of 1884. In 1886, he began his career as an independent architect in Philadelphia. Fielding undertook over 200 works of architecture, mostly in the Philadelphia area for many different patrons.

He also was a historian, biographer, and compiler of early American art, artists, and engravers – notably, his 1926 publication, Dictionary of American Painters, Sculptors, and Engravers. (see § Published work (chronological), below)

== Tennis; Grand Slam Finals – Mixed Doubles ==
Fielding competed in the 1895 and 1896 U.S National Tennis Championships and reached the finals of the mixed doubles events with his future wife Amy Williams. (see § Family, below)

Result	Year	Championship	Surface	Partner	Opponents	Score
Loss	1895	U.S. Championships	Grass	(United States) Amy Williams	(United States) Juliette Atkinson (United States) Edwin P. Fischer	6–4, 6–8, 2–6
Loss	1896	U.S. Championships	Grass	(United States) Amy Williams	(United States) Juliette Atkinson (United States) Edwin P. Fischer	2–6, 3–6, 3–6

== Architectural work ==
Fielding's works include:

1. 1891 – Fielding's own residence – "The Barn" – at 28 West Walnut Lane, Philadelphia, was a renovation by Fielding that was once the Wyck barn, built in 1796 by J. Frederick Thomas.
2. 1892 – The Terry Building, 207 South Jefferson Street (at Campbell, southeast corner), Roanoke, Virginia. A seven-story Italianesque stone and pressed-brick office building with a mansard roof, became the tallest building in Roanoke. Peyton Leftwich Terry (1835–1898) was the building's namesake. The building was razed in 1926 and, in its place, in 1927, the Colonial National Bank building was erected.
3. 1898 – The Boys' and Girls' Club, originally called the Boys Parlor Association, 23 West Penn Street, Germantown
4. 1898 – Robert Early Strawbridge, Jr., Residence, "Meadow Lodge," Bryn Mawr, on the Main Line, which, as described by The New York Times, is a Tudor Country House on 47 acres with gardens, tennis courts, orchard, 17th century English style, half-timbered architecture, carved wood paneling, archways, lead mullioned windows, fire places. The entrance is patterned after Windsor Castle's Great Hall. Thirty-two rooms.
5. 1899 – The Charles Currie House (Charles Aitken Currie, MD; 1856–1937) at 50 West Walnut Lane in the Tulpehocken Station Historic District, in Philadelphia. The district has been on the National Register of Historic Places since November 26, 1985, and is bounded by on the North by McCallum Street, on the East by West Walnut Lane, on the South by Penn Central railroad tracks, and the West by West Tulpehocken Street, in the Germantown neighborhood, bordering on the Colonial Germantown Historic District, a National Historic Landmark district. This house – named Comawaben (1899) – is a Georgian Revival mansion built in local in Wissahickon schist, that closely aligns with the original Georgian style, except for the large size of the building.
6. 1902 – James E. Wheeler House (James Everett Wheeler; 1870–1954), lawyer, 82 Edge Hill Road, New Haven, Connecticut, in the Prospect Hill Historic District (1902). His wife, Edith Pemberton Williams (1874–1953) was a 1st cousin of Fielding's wife, Amy Reeve Williams. The house is a 2 1/2-story structure with stucco façade.
7. 1905 – The Tuleyries, White Post, Virginia – Graham Furber Blandy (1868–1926), a nephew of Mrs. Andrew Carnegie, around 1905, acquired The Tuleyries, near White Post, Virginia, and adjacent lands totaling over 900 acres. Blandy hired Mantle Fielding to restore and improve the mansion. Upon Blandy's death, his widow, Georgette Haven Borland (maiden; 1886–1939) inherited part of the Tuleyries estate. The remainder of the estate was bequeathed to the University of Virginia for an experimental farm. (see Blandy Experimental Farm and the Virginia State Arboretum) Graham Blandy (class of 1885), his brother, Isaac Cruse Blandy (1866–1937) (class of 1883), and Fielding (class of 1884) had been students together at the Germantown Academy.
8. 1906 – The Page Memorial Chapel, Riverside Cemetery, Oswego, New York. The Chapel was commissioned by descendants of Alanson Sumner Page (1825–1905) and Elsie A. Benson (maiden; 1835–1996). A stone structure, Fielding designed it in a Gothic Revival style. Frederick Wilson (1858–1932), a lead designer of Tiffany Studios of New York City, designed the interior windows. The chapel stands at the entrance of the cemetery. The cemetery, in 1993, was designated on the list of National Register of Historic Places.
9. 1915 – Abington YMCA, Abington Township
Fielding works

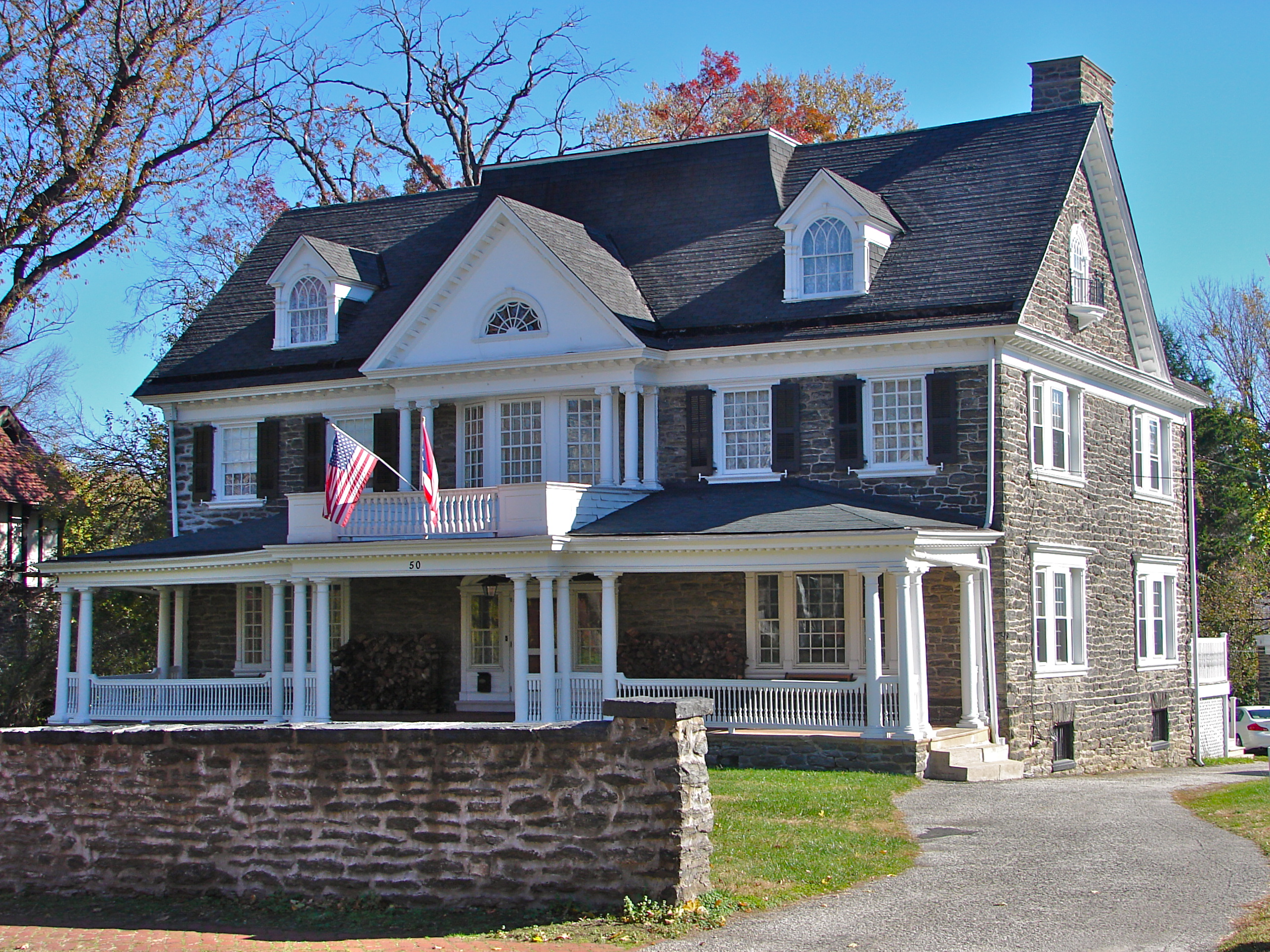
50 West Walnut Lane, "Comawaben," Germantown (1899)

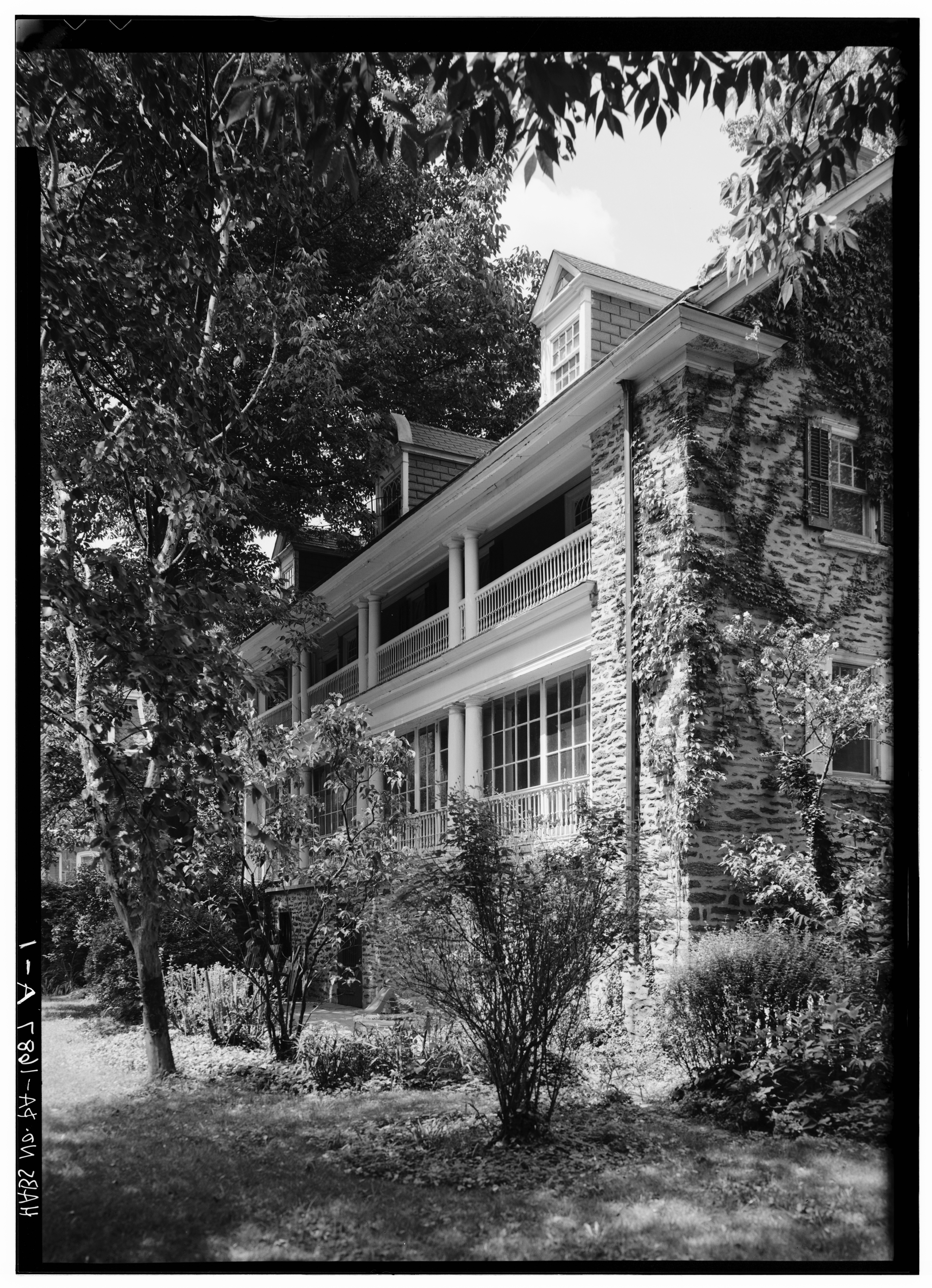
Fielding's residence, 28 West Walnut Lane, "The Barn," Germantown

== Published work (chronological) ==
- Fielding, Mantle (1917). American Engravers Upon Copper and Steel: Biographical Sketches and Check Lists of Engravings: A Supplement to David McNeeley Stauffer's American Engravers. Philadelphia. p. gbpv=1. LCCN 17028857. OCLC 407133366 – via Google Books. (alternate link
- —— (1964) [1917]. American Engravers Upon Copper and Steel: Biographical Sketches and Check Lists of Engravings (Reprint). Burt Franklin bibliography and reference series, 54. New York: Burt Franklin – via HathiTrust.
- Stauffer, David McNeeley (1907). American Engravers Upon Copper and Steel. The Grolier Club of the City of New York. LCCN 07021731. OCLC 217218223.
  - Part I: Biographical Sketches Illustrated – via Google Books
  - Part II: Check-List of the Works of Earlier Engravers – via Google Books
- Biddle, Edward; Fielding, Mantle (1921). The Life and Works of Thomas Sully (1783–1872). Lancaster, Pennsylvania: Wickersham Press. LCCN 22001359. OCLC 4556039 – via HathiTrust.
- Fielding, Mantle (1922). "American Naval Portraits: Engraved by David Edwin, after Gilbert Stuart, and Others". The Print Connoisseur. Vol. 2. pp. 123–138.
- —— (1923). Gilbert Stuart's Portraits of George Washington. Philadelphia. LCCN 24003342. OCLC 2717564 – via Internet Archive.
- —— (1925). Catalogue of an Exhibition of Portraits by John Neagle (Final ed.). Philadelphia: Pennsylvania Academy of the Fine Arts. OCLC 564446786, 1336302336, 883977801, 11903955, 11903955 – via HathiTrust.
  Re: Exhibition at the Pennsylvania Academy of the Fine Arts: April 12, 1925 – May 13, 1925.
- —— (1926). Dictionary of American Painters, Sculptors and Engravers. Philadelphia. LCCN 26012775. OCLC 962740941 – via HathiTrust.
  - —— (1960). Dictionary of American Painters, Sculptors and Engravers (Reprint). Paul A. Stroock (publisher) – via HathiTrust.
- Morgan, John Hill; Fielding, Mantle (1931). The Life Portraits of Washington and Their Replicas. Lancaster, Pennsylvania: Lancaster Press. LCCN 32006554. OCLC 935594532.
- Fielding, Mantle (1934). "Collection of John Frederick Lewis". Exhibition of American Portraits – April 15, 1934 – May 6, 1934. Philadelphia: Pennsylvania Academy of the Fine Arts. OCLC 2382461 – via HathiTrust.
Pennsylvania Magazine of History and Biography
- Fielding, Mantle (October 1904). "Engraved Works of David Edwin (Not Mentioned in Mr. Hildeburn's List)". Pennsylvania Magazine of History and Biography. 28 (4): 420–427. JSTOR 20085253. OCLC 62555153, 5543725601 – via HathiTrust.
  supplements list of Edwin's engravings compiled in:
  Hildeburn, Charles Riché (1894). "A Contribution to a Catalogue of the Engraved Works of David Edwin". Pennsylvania Magazine of History and Biography. 18 (1): 97–118. ProQuest 137608012; OCLC 40528144, 3620758.
- —— (July 1905). "David Edwin, Engraver". Pennsylvania Magazine of History and Biography. 29 (3): 320–325. JSTOR 20085296. OCLC 852406618 – via HathiTrust.
- —— (July 1906). "Rare Edwin Prints". Pennsylvania Magazine of History and Biography. 30 (3): 353–354. JSTOR 20085344. OCLC 5543722274 – via Google Books.
- —— (January 1907). "Joseph Andrews". Pennsylvania Magazine of History and Biography. 31 (1): 103–113. JSTOR 20085373. OCLC 852405323, 80075336, 5543718461 – via Google Books.
- —— (July 1914). "Paintings by Gilbert Stuart Not Mentioned in Mason's Life of Stuart". Pennsylvania Magazine of History and Biography. 38 (3): 311–334. JSTOR 20086177. OCLC 3257587 – via HathiTrust.
  Referenced work:
  Mason, George Champlin Sr. (1907). The Life and Works of Gilbert Stuart. Charles Scribner's Sons. LCCN 10022179. OCLC 258838 – via HathiTrust.
- —— (January 1920). "Addenda and Corrections to Paintings by Gilbert Stuart Not Mentioned in Mason's Life of Stuart". Pennsylvania Magazine of History and Biography. 44 (1): 88–91. JSTOR 20086406. OCLC 852377251 – via Google Books.
- —— (July 1920). "Robert Street, Artist". Pennsylvania Magazine of History and Biography. 45 (3): 255–257. JSTOR 20086450. OCLC 1157920850, 5543729168 – via Google Books.
- —— (July 1924). "Edward Savage's Portraits of Washington". Pennsylvania Magazine of History and Biography. 48 (3): 193–200. JSTOR 20086539. OCLC 5543723739 – via Penn State.

== Affiliations ==
- Walpole Society, member
- T-Square Club, member, joined in 1886
- Art Club of Philadelphia, member
- Pennsylvania Academy of the Fine Arts
- Historical Society of Pennsylvania, member

== Family ==
Fielding – on November 16, 1898, in Philadelphia – married Amy Reeve Williams (1872–1969). They had two children, Richard Mantle Fielding (1904–1974) and Frances (1906–1966), whose husband, Joseph Allison Scott, Jr. (1900–1959), was (i) a grandson of U.S. Senator from Pennsylvania, John Scott (1824–1896) and (ii) nephew of American cricketer Walter Scott (1868–1907). Mantle Fielding and his wife lived in Germantown, Philadelphia, for many years.

Fielding, at age 75, died at his home in Chestnut Hill. His widow, Amy Fielding – on January 7, 1942, in Bala Cynwyd – re-married, to John Duncan Spaeth (1868–1954), an academician.

== Bibliography ==
=== References ===
General

- "The Alumni". A History of the Germantown Academy. Philadelphia: S.H. Burbank & Co. 1910. pp. 273–321. LCCN 29005868. OCLC 36575172 – via Internet Archive.
- Chauncey, Charles (August 1909). "House of James E. Wheeler – Edgehill Road, New Haven, Connecticut". American Homes and Gardens. Vol. 6, no. 8. pp. 330–332. ISSN 1049-1104. LCCN 06022575. OCLC 1479984 – via Internet Archive.
- Bogrette, Christine Durham (1993). The Abington YMCA: A Case Study of an American Institutional Building Type (Master thesis). University of Pennsylvania. pp. 97–99. OCLC 244970061 – via Internet Archive.
- Wilson, Alice B. (April 1964). "The Tuleyries" (PDF). Boxwood Bulletin. Vol. 3, no. 4. pp. 59–60. ISSN 0006-8535. OCLC 2445419.
- Priestman, Mabel Tuke (March 1908). "The Barn That Found Itself". Country Life. Vol. 13, no. 5. pp. 522–523 – via Google Books.
- Foust, Doreen L. (1985). Wyncote, Pennsylvania: the History, Development, Architecture and Preservation of a Victorian Philadelphia Suburb (Master thesis). pp. 94–95, 136–137. OCLC 244926355 – via Internet Archive.
- King, Moses (1902). Philadelphia and Notable Philadelphians. OCLC 842406970 – via Google Books.
  - Wistar Morris Residence, "Green Hill Farm" Overbrook (p. 75).
  - Edward Varian Douglas Residence, 124 West Chestnut Hill Avenue, Chestnut Hill (p. 84).
  - Walter Pearce Douglas Residence, 251 West Walnut Lane, Germantown (p. 87).
  - Robert Early Strawbridge, Jr., Residence "Meadow Lodge," Bryn Mawr (p. 90)
- "Marriage of John D. Spaeth and Amy Fielding, January 7, 1941, by Rev Francis C[ope] Hartshorne at Bala Cynwyd". FamilySearch. physical source: Pennsylvania, County Marriages, 1885–1950. Chester County, Marriage License Docket No. 29 – August 18, 1941, to February 11, 1944; page 88; index no. 41028) (digital image 304 of 566; film no. 4455270
- "Mantle Fielding, 75, Painting Authority – Philadelphia Architect, Expert on Early American Engravings". Obituaries. The New York Times. Vol. 90, no. 30379. March 28, 1941. p. 23.
- "Other Show Houses and Forthcoming Home Tours in the Area". The New York Times. Vol. 130, no. 44927 (Late City ed.). April 23, 1981. p. C6.
- "Architects Notes: M. Fielding, Architect ..." Philadelphia Real Estate Record and Builders' Guide. Vol. 5, no. 37. September 17, 1890. p. 562 – via Internet Archive.
- "A Leonine Man". Princeton Alumni Weekly. Vol. 55, no. 1. September 24, 1954. pp. 7–8. ISSN 0149-9270. OCLC 656588156 – via Google Books.
- White, William Chapman (September 24, 1954). "J. Duncan Spaeth – An Appreciation". Princeton Alumni Weekly. Vol. 55, no. 1. p. 8.
- "Memorials – John Duncan Spaeth". Princeton Alumni Weekly. Vol. 55, no. 4. October 15, 1954. pp. 27–28.
- Historical Program: Roanoke Diamond Jubilee: Celebration June 14–23, 1957 (PDF). p. 69. OCLC 2173812 – via Virginia Room.
- Tatman, Sandra Lee; Moss, Roger William Jr (1985). "Fielding, Mantle, Jr. (1865–1941) – Architect, and Art Historian". Biographical Dictionary of Philadelphia Architects, 1700–1930. Boston: G. K. Hall & Co. p. 266. ISBN 978-0-8161-0437-6. OCLC 84022550 – via Philadelphia Architects and Buildings.
- Beisert, Oscar Dean (September 29, 2021). "Nomination of Historic Building, Structure, or Object: 5920 Greene Street" (PDF). City of Philadelphia.

Tennis

- Orcutt, William Dana, ed. (July 18, 1895). "The Women's Championships". Official Lawn Tennis Bulletin. Vol. 2, no. 9 – via Google Books.
- ——, ed. (March 11, 1897). "Minutes of the United States National Lawn Tennis Association". Official Lawn Tennis Bulletin. Vol. 4, no. 3 – via Google Books.
- ——, ed. (July 8, 1897). "The Women's Championships". Official Lawn Tennis Bulletin. Vol. 4, no. 7 – via Google Books.
- ——, ed. (July 22, 1897). "Pennsylvania State Championship". Official Lawn Tennis Bulletin. Vol. 4, no. 9 – via Google Books.
- Slocum, Henry Warner Jr. (1890). Lawn Tennis in Our Own Country. A.G. Spalding & Bros. – via Google Books.
  - U.S. National Lawn Tennis Association Championships. Newport.
    - August 21–24, 1883. p. 164
    - August 25–28, 1884. p. 164
    - August 18–21, 1885. p. 166
    - August 23–28, 1886. p. 141
    - August 23–28, 1886. p. 166
    - August 22–30, 1887. p. 146
    - August 20–25, 1888. p. 149
    - August 21–28, 1889. p. 151
- "U.S. National / US Open Champions – Mixed Doubles" (PDF). United States Tennis Association. Archived from the original (PDF) on August 12, 2011.
- Whittelsey, Joseph T, ed. (1895). Wright & Ditson Officially Adopted Lawn Tennis Guide. Boston: Wright & Ditson – via HathiTrust.
  - U.S. Women's Championships. Philadelphia Cricket Club, Wissahickon Heights.
    - June 12–16, 1894.
      - "Doubles." p. 50 ("Williams")
      - "Doubles." p. 78 ("Williams")
    - "1895 Club Champions." p. 84 ("Fielding")
    - "Tennis Players' Directory." p. 183 ("Fielding")
