= John Duncan Spaeth =

American philologist

- Born: September 27, 1868; Philadelphia, Pennsylvania, US
- Died: July 26, 1954 (aged 85); Wayne, Pennsylvania, US
- Education: University of Pennsylvania; Leipzig University
- Known for: Leading American authority on William Shakespeare
- Scientific career
- Fields: Philology
- Institutions: Princeton University; University of Kansas

John Duncan Ernst Spaeth (September 27, 1868 − July 26, 1954) was an American philologist. A professor of English at Princeton University and later President of the University of Kansas, Spaeth was considered one of the foremost authorities on William Shakespeare in the United States.

== Biography ==
John Duncan Spaeth was born in Philadelphia on September 27, 1868. His father, Rev. Dr. Adolph Spaeth, was a native of Esslingen am Neckar, which is now in Germany. His mother, Marie Dorothea Duncan, was a native of Edinburgh, Scotland. The two had met while Adolph was the tutor to the Duke of Argyll. After completing high school in Philadelphia, Spaeth attended the University of Pennsylvania, where he was active sportsman, graduating with a degree in philology in 1887. He received his doctorate in philology from Leipzig University in 1892, and subsequently continued his studies in France and Italy. Since 1895 he was on the faculty of Central High School in New Jersey, where he taught English and helped form the Athletic Commission. In 1905 Spaeth was appointed Professor of English at Princeton University by university president Woodrow Wilson. The adult educational project initiated by Spaeth at Princeton would since be expanded to all parts of the United States. At Princeton, Spaeth was active as an amateur rowing coach, and is thus referred to as the "father of rowing" at Princeton University. Spaeth retired from Princeton in 1936, subsequently becoming the first president of the University of Kansas City. After retiring from the University of Kansas City, Spaeth became a lecturer at Haverford College and taught Shakespearean literature at the adult educational program in Merion, which was attended by many prominent Philadelphia educators.

Spaeth was the author of several papers on English literature, and was a member of the American Academy of Political and Social Science, the Modern Language Association, Phi Beta Kappa and various other societies

Spaeth's first wife, Marie Tinette Hauhgton, died in 1937. He married Mrs. Amy Fielding, widow of the architect Mantle Fielding, in 1942. Spaeth died at his home in Wayne, Pennsylvania on July 26, 1954, and was survived by four children.

== Bibliography ==
=== References ===
- Philadelphia Inquirer (The) (July 28, 1954). "John D. Spaeth Dies; Ex-Educator Was 85". Vol. 251, no. 28. p. 19 – via Newspapers.com.
- Princeton Alumni Weekly. Retrieved August 23, 2022 – via Google Books. ISSN 0149-9270; OCLC 656588156 (all editions).
1. "A Leonine Man". Vol. 55(1). September 24, 1954. pp. 7–8.
2. White, William Chapman (September 24, 1954). "J. Duncan Spaeth – An Appreciation". Vol. 55(1). p. 8.
3. "Memorials – John Duncan Spaeth". Vol. 55(4). October 15, 1954. pp. 27–28.
