= 1895 U.S. National Championships – Women's singles =

Women's singles
- 1895 U.S. National Championships

Final
- Champion: (United States) Juliette Atkinson
- Runner-up: (United States) Helen Hellwig
- Score: 6–4, 6–2, 6–1

Details
- Draw: 13 + CR
- Seeds: –

Events
Singles	men	women
Doubles	men	women
- U.S. National Championships

Juliette Atkinson won the singles tennis title by defeating reigning champion Helen Hellwig 6–4, 6–2, 6–1 in the Challenge Round of the 1895 U.S. Women's National Singles Championship. Atkinson had won the right to challenge Hellwig by defeating Elisabeth Moore 6–3, 7–5, 3–6, 6–0 in the final of the All Comers' competition. The event was played on outdoor grass courts and held at the Philadelphia Cricket Club in Wissahickon Heights, Chestnut Hill, Philadelphia from June 25 through June 29, 1895.

== Draw ==
=== Challenge round ===
Challenge Round
(United States) Helen Hellwig	4	2	1
(United States) Juliette Atkinson	6	6	6

=== All Comers' finals ===
Quarterfinals
(United States) Juliette Atkinson	6	6
(United States) Amy Williams	0	4
(United States) Kathleen Atkinson	6	6
(United States) Mary Warren	3	2
(United States) Bertha Toulmin	6	6
(United States) Elizabeth Taylor	1	2
(United States) Elisabeth Moore	6	6
(United States) Grace Booth	0	2

Semifinals
(United States) Juliette Atkinson	6	6
(United States) Kathleen Atkinson	1	4
(United States) Bertha Toulmin	4	4
(United States) Elisabeth Moore	6	6

Finals
(United States) Juliette Atkinson	6	7	3	6
(United States) Elisabeth Moore	3	5	6	0

Preceded by 1895 Wimbledon Championships – Women's singles	Grand Slam women's singles	Succeeded by 1896 Wimbledon Championships – Women's singles
