= 1898 U.S. National Championships – Women's singles =

Women's singles
- 1898 U.S. National Championships

Final
- Champion: (United States) Juliette Atkinson
- Runner-up: (United States) Marion Jones
- Score: 6–3, 5–7, 6–4, 2–6, 7–5

Details
- Draw: 11
- Seeds: –

Events
Singles	men	women
Doubles	men	women
- U.S. National Championships

Juliette Atkinson won the singles tennis title of the 1898 U.S. Women's National Singles Championship by defeating challenger Marion Jones 6–3, 5–7, 6–4, 2–6, 7–5 in the Challenge Round, surviving five matchpoints in the final set. It was Atkinon's third singles title, after 1895 and 1897, which gave her permanent ownership of the Wissahickon Inn Challenge Cup. Jones had won the right to challenge Atkinson by defeating Helen Crump 6–4, 7–5, 6–4 in the final of the All Comers' competition. The event was played on outdoor grass courts and held at the Philadelphia Cricket Club in Wissahickon Heights, Chestnut Hill, Philadelphia from June 14 through June 18, 1898.

== Draw ==
=== Challenge round ===
Challenge Round
(United States) Juliette Atkinson	6	5	6	2	7
(United States) Marion Jones	3	7	4	6	5

=== All Comers' finals ===
Quarterfinals
(United States) Helen Crump	6	6
(United States) Maud Banks	1	3
(United States) Elizabeth Rastall	1	0
(United States) Marie Wimer	6	6
(United States) Carrie Neely	6	6
(United States) Helen Chapman	3	2
(United States) Kathleen Atkinson	4	3
(United States) Marion Jones	6	6

Semifinals
(United States) Helen Crump	6	2	10
(United States) Marie Wimer	3	6	8
(United States) Carrie Neely	0	0
(United States) Marion Jones	6	6

Finals
(United States) Helen Crump	4	5	4
(United States) Marion Jones	6	7	6

Preceded by 1898 Wimbledon Championships – Women's singles	Grand Slam women's singles	Succeeded by 1899 Wimbledon Championships – Women's singles
