= 1899 Wimbledon Championships – Men's doubles =

Men's doubles
- 1899 Wimbledon Championships

Final
- Champions: (United Kingdom) Laurence Doherty (United Kingdom) Reginald Doherty
- Runners-up: (United States) Clarence Hobart (United Kingdom) Harold Nisbet
- Score: 7–5, 6–0, 6–2

Details
- Draw: 15
- Seeds: –

Events
Singles	men	women
Doubles	men	women
← 1898 ·	Wimbledon Championships	· 1900 →

Clarence Hobart and Harold Nisbet defeated Herbert Roper Barrett and Arthur Gore 6–4, 6–1, 8–6 in the All Comers' Final, but the reigning champions Laurence Doherty and Reginald Doherty defeated Hobart and Nisbet 7–5, 6–0, 6–2 in the challenge round to win the gentlemen's doubles tennis title at the 1899 Wimbledon Championships.

== Draw ==
=== Key ===
- Q = Qualifier
- WC = Wild card
- LL = Lucky loser
- Alt = Alternate
- SE = Special exempt
- PR = Protected ranking
- ITF = ITF entry
- JE = Junior exempt
- w/o = Walkover
- r = Retired
- d = Defaulted
- SR = Special ranking

=== Challenge round ===
Challenge round
(United States) Clarence Hobart (United Kingdom) Harold Nisbet	5	0	2
(United Kingdom) Laurence Doherty (United Kingdom) Reginald Doherty	7	6	6

=== All Comers' ===
First round
(United Kingdom) Charles Allen (United Kingdom) Roy Allen	6	6	6
(United Kingdom) Archibald McNair (United Kingdom) Roderick McNair	2	3	1
(United States) Clarence Hobart (United Kingdom) Harold Nisbet	6	6	6
(United Kingdom) Maurice Day (United Kingdom) Alexander Mackay	3	3	3
(United Kingdom) George Hillyard (United Kingdom) Sydney Smith	7	6	6
(United Kingdom) P Pearson (United Kingdom) MRL White	5	1	2
(United Kingdom) George Caridia (United Kingdom) George Simond	7	9	8
(United Kingdom) Wilberforce Eaves (United Kingdom) Harold Mahony	5	7	6
(United Kingdom) Herbert Roper Barrett (United Kingdom) Arthur Gore	6	6	6
(United Kingdom) A Raleigh (United Kingdom) HS Cross	0	1	2
(United Kingdom) Clement Cazalet (United Kingdom) George Greville	8	6	1	6
(United Kingdom) Ambrose Dudley (United Kingdom) B Wood-Hill	6	1	6	4
(United Kingdom) Charles Dixon (United Kingdom) Major Ritchie	6	6	4	7
(United Kingdom) K Arthur (United Kingdom) Gillibrand Evered	0	2	6	5

Quarterfinals
(United Kingdom) Charles Allen (United Kingdom) Roy Allen	4	6	4
(United States) Clarence Hobart (United Kingdom) Harold Nisbet	6	8	6
(United Kingdom) George Hillyard (United Kingdom) Sydney Smith	4	3	10	6
(United Kingdom) George Caridia (United Kingdom) George Simond	6	6	8	8
(United Kingdom) Herbert Roper Barrett (United Kingdom) Arthur Gore	6	0	7	6
(United Kingdom) Clement Cazalet (United Kingdom) George Greville	3	6	5	4
(United Kingdom) Charles Dixon (United Kingdom) Major Ritchie	2	6	6	6
(United Kingdom) Allan Pearson (United Kingdom) Frederick Plaskitt	6	3	4	2

Semifinals
(United States) Clarence Hobart (United Kingdom) Harold Nisbet	3	4	6	6	6
(United Kingdom) George Caridia (United Kingdom) George Simond	6	6	1	4	3
(United Kingdom) Herbert Roper Barrett (United Kingdom) Arthur Gore	3	6	6	6
(United Kingdom) Charles Dixon (United Kingdom) Major Ritchie	6	4	4	1

Final
(United States) Clarence Hobart (United Kingdom) Harold Nisbet	6	6	8
(United Kingdom) Herbert Roper Barrett (United Kingdom) Arthur Gore	4	1	6
