= 1897 U.S. National Championships – Women's singles =

Women's singles
- 1897 U.S. National Championships

Final
- Champion: (United States) Juliette Atkinson
- Runner-up: (United States) Elisabeth Moore
- Score: 6–3, 6–3, 4–6, 3–6, 6–3

Details
- Draw: 11 + CR
- Seeds: –

Events
Singles	men	women
Doubles	men	women
- U.S. National Championships

Juliette Atkinson won the singles tennis title by defeating reigning champion Elisabeth Moore 6–3, 6–3, 4–6, 3–6, 6–3 in the Challenge Round of the 1897 U.S. Women's National Singles Championship, reversing the result of the previous Championships. Atkinson had won the right to challenge Moore by defeating Edith Kenderdine 6–2, 6–4, 6–0 in the final of the All Comers' competition. The event was played on outdoor grass courts and held at the Philadelphia Cricket Club in Wissahickon Heights, Chestnut Hill, Philadelphia from June 15 through June 19, 1897.

== Draw ==
=== Challenge round ===
Challenge Round
(United States) Elisabeth Moore	3	3	6	6	3
(United States) Juliette Atkinson	6	6	4	3	6

=== All Comers' finals ===
Quarterfinals
(United States) Juliette Atkinson	6	4	6
(United States) Maud Banks	1	6	1
(United States) Kathleen Atkinson	6	6
(United States) Hattie Beaumont	4	0
(United States) Edith Kenderdine	6	4	8
(United States) Ellen Ketcham	2	6	6
(United States) Carrie Neely	6	6
(United States) Mrs. Edwards	2	1

Semifinals
(United States) Juliette Atkinson	6	6
(United States) Kathleen Atkinson	1	3
(United States) Edith Kenderdine	7	2	6
(United States) Carrie Neely	5	6	1

Finals
(United States) Juliette Atkinson	6	6	6
(United States) Edith Kenderdine	2	4	0

Preceded by 1897 Wimbledon Championships – Women's singles	Grand Slam women's singles	Succeeded by 1898 Wimbledon Championships – Women's singles
