= 1897 U.S. National Championships (tennis) =

- Date: August 16–23 (M); June 15–19 (W)
- Edition: 17th
- Category: Grand Slam
- Surface: Grass
- Location: Newport, R.I., United States (M); Philadelphia, PA, United States (W)

Champions

Men's singles
- (United States) Robert Wrenn

Women's singles
- (United States) Juliette Atkinson

Men's doubles
- (United States) Leo Ware / (United States) George Sheldon

Women's doubles
- (United States) Juliette Atkinson / (United States) Kathleen Atkinson

Mixed doubles
- (United States) Laura Henson / (United States) D.L. Magruder
- U.S. National Championships

The 1897 U.S. National Championships (now known as the US Open) was a tennis tournament that took place in June and August of 1897. The women's tournament was held from June 15 to June 19 on the outdoor grass courts at the Philadelphia Cricket Club in Philadelphia, Pennsylvania. The men's tournament was held from August 16 to August 23 on the outdoor grass courts at the Newport Casino in Newport, Rhode Island. It was the 17th U.S. National Championships and the second Grand Slam tournament of the year.

== Finals ==
=== Men's singles ===
(United States) Robert Wrenn defeated (United Kingdom) Wilberforce Eaves 4–6, 8–6, 6–3, 2–6, 6–2

=== Women's singles ===
(United States) Juliette Atkinson defeated (United States) Elisabeth Moore 6–3, 6–3, 4–6, 3–6, 6–3

=== Men's doubles ===
(United States) Leo Ware / (United States) George Sheldon defeated (United Kingdom) Harold Mahony / (United Kingdom) Harold Nisbet 11–13, 6–2, 9–7, 1–6, 6–1

=== Women's doubles ===
(United States) Juliette Atkinson / (United States) Kathleen Atkinson defeated (United States) Mrs. Edwards / (United Kingdom) Elizabeth Rastall 6–2, 6–1, 6–1

=== Mixed doubles ===
(United States) Laura Henson / (United States) D.L. Magruder defeated (United States) Maud Banks / (United States) B.L.C. Griffith 6–4, 6–3, 7–5

Preceded by 1897 Wimbledon Championships	Grand Slams	Succeeded by 1898 Wimbledon Championships
