= The Tuleyries =

Historic house in Virginia, United States

- U.S. National Register of Historic Places
- Virginia Landmarks Register
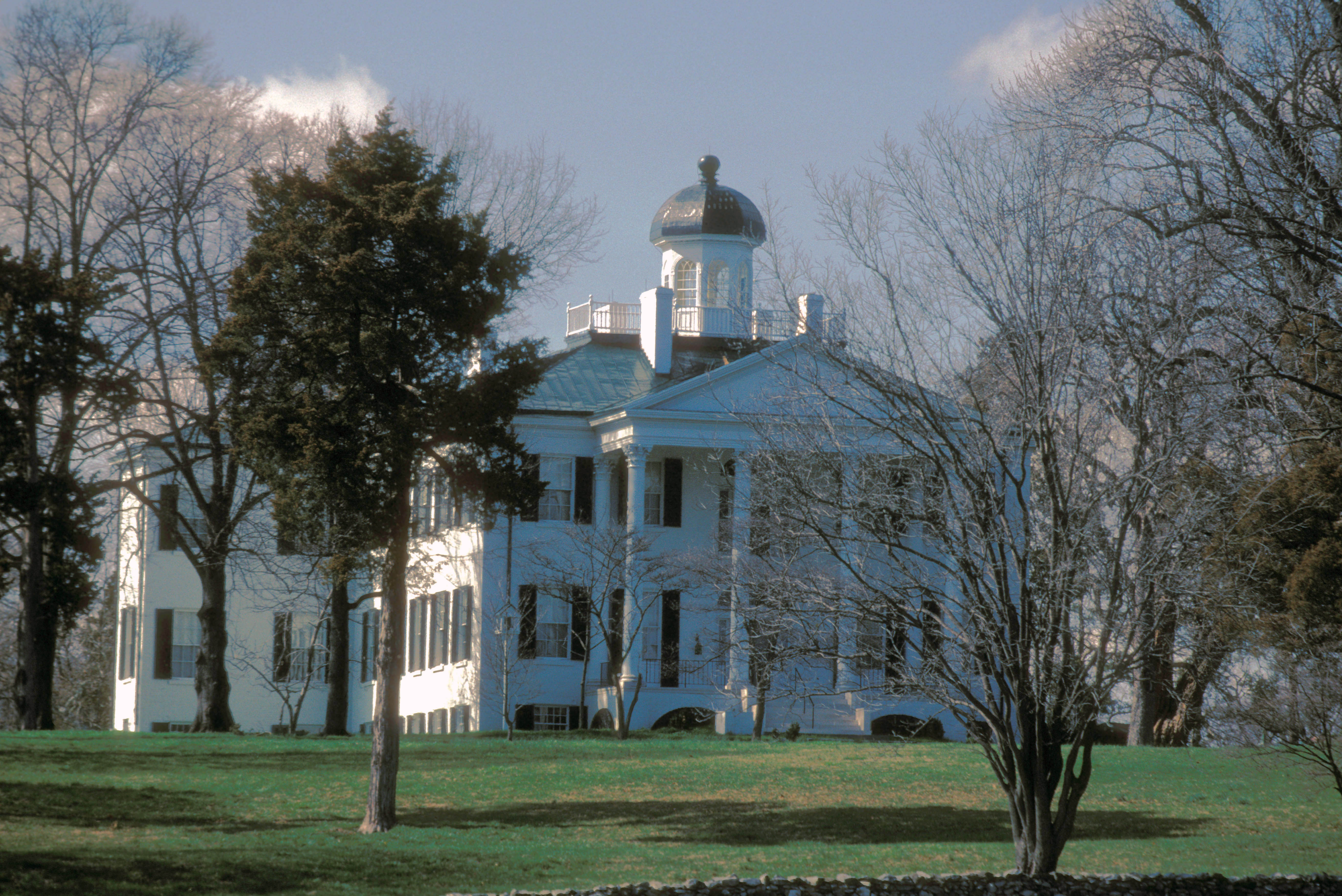
- The Tuleyries, March 1971

- Location within Northern Virginia Location within Virginia Location within the United States
- Location: 1.5 mi. E of White Post off VA 628, White Post, Virginia
- Coordinates: 39°4′16″N 78°4′26″W
- Area: 20 acres (8.1 ha)
- Built: 1833
- Architectural style: Federal, Late Federal
- NRHP reference No.: 72001388
- VLR No.: 021-0082

Significant dates
- Added to NRHP: August 7, 1972
- Designated VLR: July 6, 1971

The Tuleyries is an ante-bellum estate near White Post, Virginia.

== History ==
The complex was built around 1833 by Colonel Joseph Tuley, Jr. (1796–1860), a large slaveholder, who made the name a pun on his name and the Tuileries Palace. The house is a late Federal style mansion with a domed entrance hall. The house was sold by the Tuley family to Colonel Upton Lawrence Boyce (1830–1907) in 1866.

In 1903 the property was acquired by Graham Furber Blandy (1868–1926), who hired Philadelphia architect Mantle Fielding (1865–1941) to restore and improve the mansion. Two-thirds The Tuleyries – as part of The Estate of Graham Furber Blandy, Deceased – was bequeathed to the University of Virginia.

That land is now known as the Blandy Experimental Farm and The Virginia State Arboretum. The remaining property and house remained in the Blandy family. As well as twenty acres of lawn and garden the property includes a further three hundred and eighty six acres of forest and farm.

It was listed on the National Register of Historic Places in 1972.

In March 2020, the manor house and 406 acres were listed for sale for $5 million. In October 2023, the house and most of its historic furnishings were sold at auction for $4.1 million in the bankruptcy of The Tuleyries Land Holdings LLC by the Welch Family.

== Bibliography ==
=== References ===
- Baker, "Nellie" Browne (née Ellen Fauntleroy Browne; 1882–1975) (entry) (1930) [1929]. Christian, Frances Archer (née Frances Williamson Archer; 1864–1968); Massie, Susanne Williams (née Susanne Coleman Williams; 1861–1952) (eds.). Entry → "The Tuleyries" in Homes and Gardens in Old Virginia. Richmond: J.W. Fergusson & Sons. p. 170 – via Internet Archive (Marygrove College). LCCN 30-13228; OCLC 9800024 (all editions).
  "The Tuleyries". Homes and Gardens in Old Virginia (revision of the 1929 1st ed.). Richmond: Garden Club of Virginia. 1953. pp. 517–519 – via HathiTrust (UC Davis). LCCN 53-11461; OCLC 1658741 (all editions).
- Boxwood Bulletin (The); Wilson, Alice B. (April 1964). "The Tuleyries" (PDF). American Boxwood Society.. 3 (4). Boyce, Virginia: 59–60. ISSN 0006-8535; OCLC 2445419.
The author was the wife of Orme Wilson, Jr., U.S. Ambassador to Haiti under Franklin D. Roosevelt. She was also a sister-in-law of Graham Furber Blandy
- "NRIS – National Register Information System". National Register of Historic Places. National Park Service.
- "Tuleyries" ("The") – Nomination (PDF). National Register of Historic Places. August 7, 1972.
- "Virginia Landmarks Register". Virginia Department of Historic Resources. (NRIS Nomination (PDF) (stored online by the Virginia Landmarks Register).).
