= Alexander Mackay, Lord Mackay =

Scottish law lord (1875–1955)

Alexander Morrice Mackay, Lord Mackay LLD (1875–1955) was a twentieth century Scottish lawyer and Senator of the College of Justice.

== Life ==
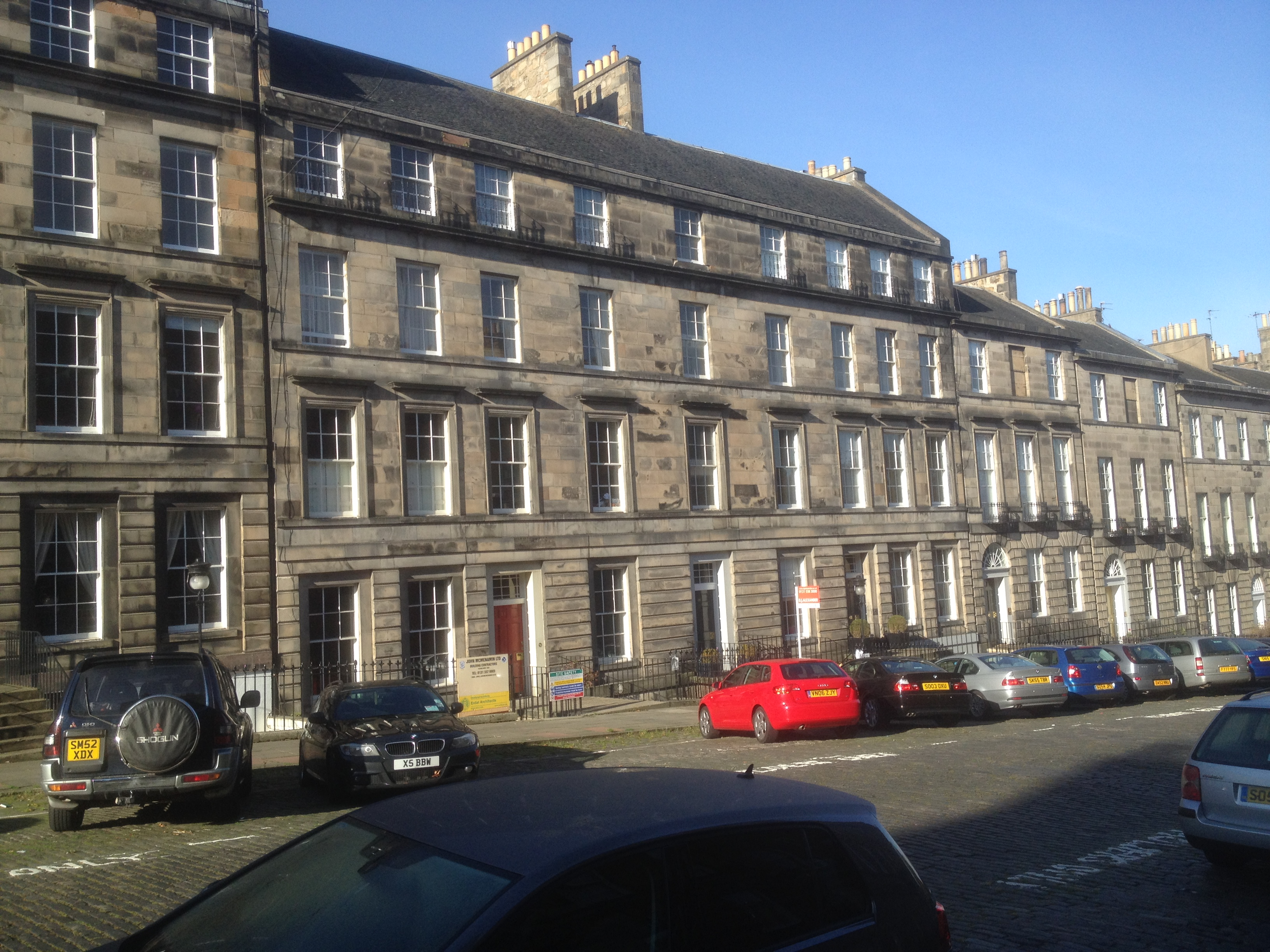
26 India Street, Edinburgh (left)

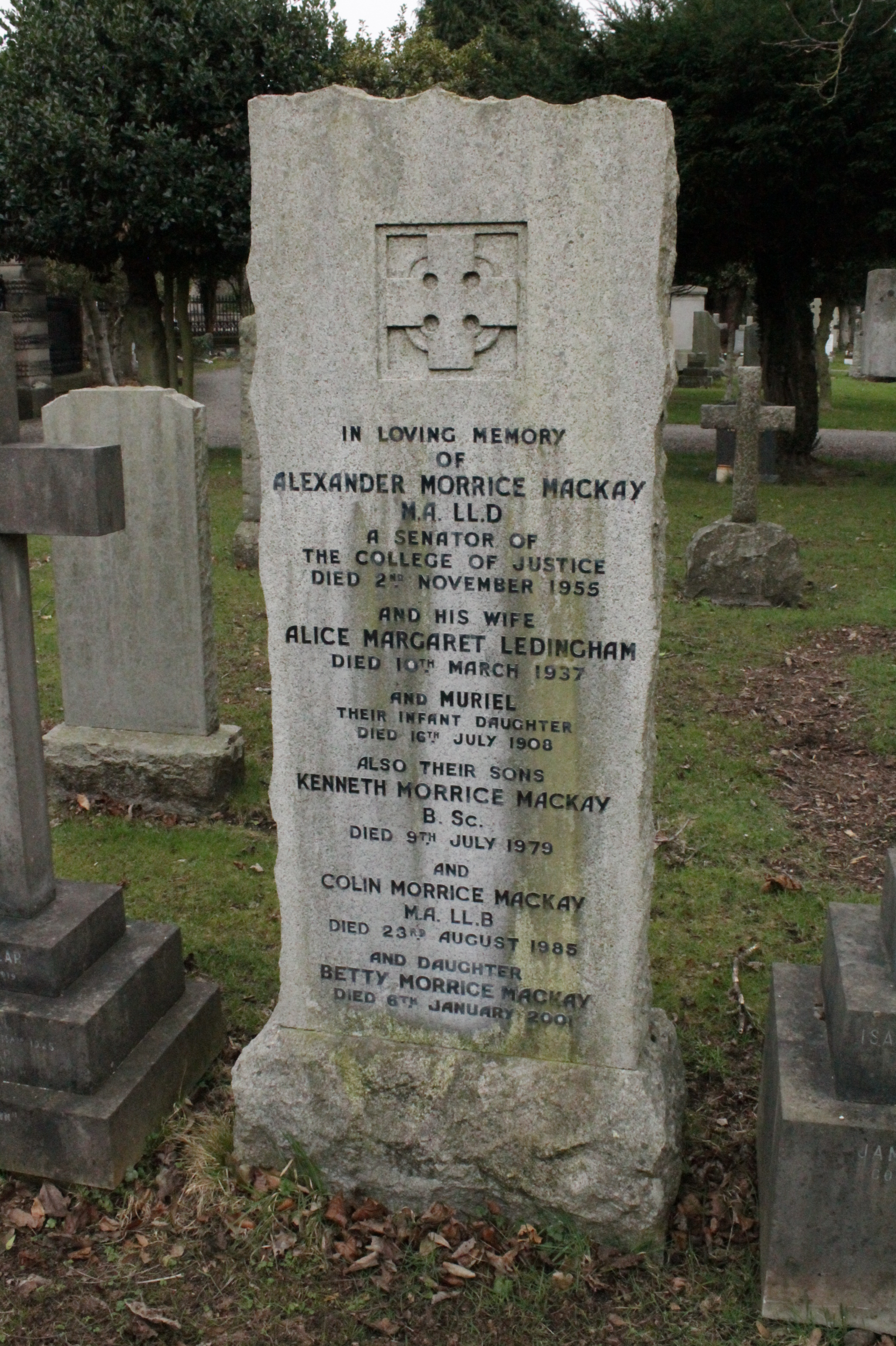
The grave of Alexander Morrice Mackay, Dean Cemetery

He was born on 6 September 1875 at 8 Albert Street in Aberdeen. He was the son of R. Whyte Mackay of Anderson & Thomson, who ran warehousing at 23/25 Broad Street.

He studied law at Trinity College, Cambridge. In 1910 he is listed as an advocate living at 26 India Street in Edinburgh's Second New Town.

In March 1926 he stood unsuccessfully as the Unionist candidate in the 1926 by-election for Bothwell. In May 1928 he took his seat as a Senator of the College of Justice, replacing John Wilson, Lord Ashmore. In 1931 he sat on the Royal Commission on Licensing, looking at alcohol and public house reforms.

He died in Edinburgh on 2 November 1955 aged 80. He is buried in Dean Cemetery in the west of the city. The grave lies in the first northern extension, in the north-east section.

== Family ==
He was married to Alice Margaret Ledingham (1883-1937).

Their children included Betty Morrice Mackay (1914-2001), Kenneth Morrice Mackay (d.1979), and Colin Morrice Mackay (d.1985).

== Trivia ==
Apparently also a competent tennis player he played in the 1899 Wimbledon tennis championships.
