= 1894 U.S. National Championships – Women's singles =

Women's singles
- 1894 U.S. National Championships

Final
- Champion: (United States) Helen Hellwig
- Runner-up: (United States) Aline Terry
- Score: 7–5, 3–6, 6–0, 3–6, 6–3

Details
- Draw: 11 + CR
- Seeds: –

Events
Singles	men	women
Doubles	men	women
- U.S. National Championships

Helen Hellwig won the singles tennis title by defeating reigning champion Aline Terry 7–5, 3–6, 6–0, 3–6, 6–3 in the Challenge Round of the 1894 U.S. Women's National Singles Championship. Hellwig had won the right to challenge Terry by defeating Bertha Toulmin 6–2, 6–5, 6–4 in the final of the All Comers' competition. The event was played on outdoor grass courts and held at the Philadelphia Cricket Club in Chestnut Hill, Philadelphia from June 12 through June 16, 1894.

== Draw ==
=== Challenge round ===
Challenge Round
(United States) Aline Terry	5	6	0	6	3
(United States) Helen Hellwig	7	3	6	3	6

=== All Comers' finals ===
Quarterfinals
(United States) Helen Hellwig	6	6
(United States) Amy Williams	2	2
(United States) Ethel Bankson	6	6
(United States) Hattie Beaumont	1	0
(United States) Bertha Toulmin	6	6
(United States) Elizabeth Beecroft	1	0
(United States) Elizabeth Slevin	1	1
(United States) Juliette Atkinson	6	6

Semifinals
(United States) Helen Hellwig	6	6
(United States) Ethel Bankson	2	1
(United States) Bertha Toulmin	4	7	6
(United States) Juliette Atkinson	6	5	4

Finals
(United States) Helen Hellwig	6	6	6
(United States) Bertha Toulmin	2	5	4

Preceded by 1894 Wimbledon Championships – Women's singles	Grand Slam women's singles	Succeeded by 1895 Wimbledon Championships – Women's singles
