= 1897 Wimbledon Championships =

- Date: 21 June – 1 July
- Edition: 21st
- Category: Grand Slam
- Surface: Grass
- Location: Worple Road; SW19, Wimbledon, London, United Kingdom
- Venue: All England Lawn Tennis Club

Champions

Men's singles
- (United Kingdom) Reginald Doherty

Women's singles
- (United Kingdom) Blanche Hillyard

Men's doubles
- (United Kingdom) Laurence Doherty / (United Kingdom) Reginald Doherty
- Wimbledon Championships

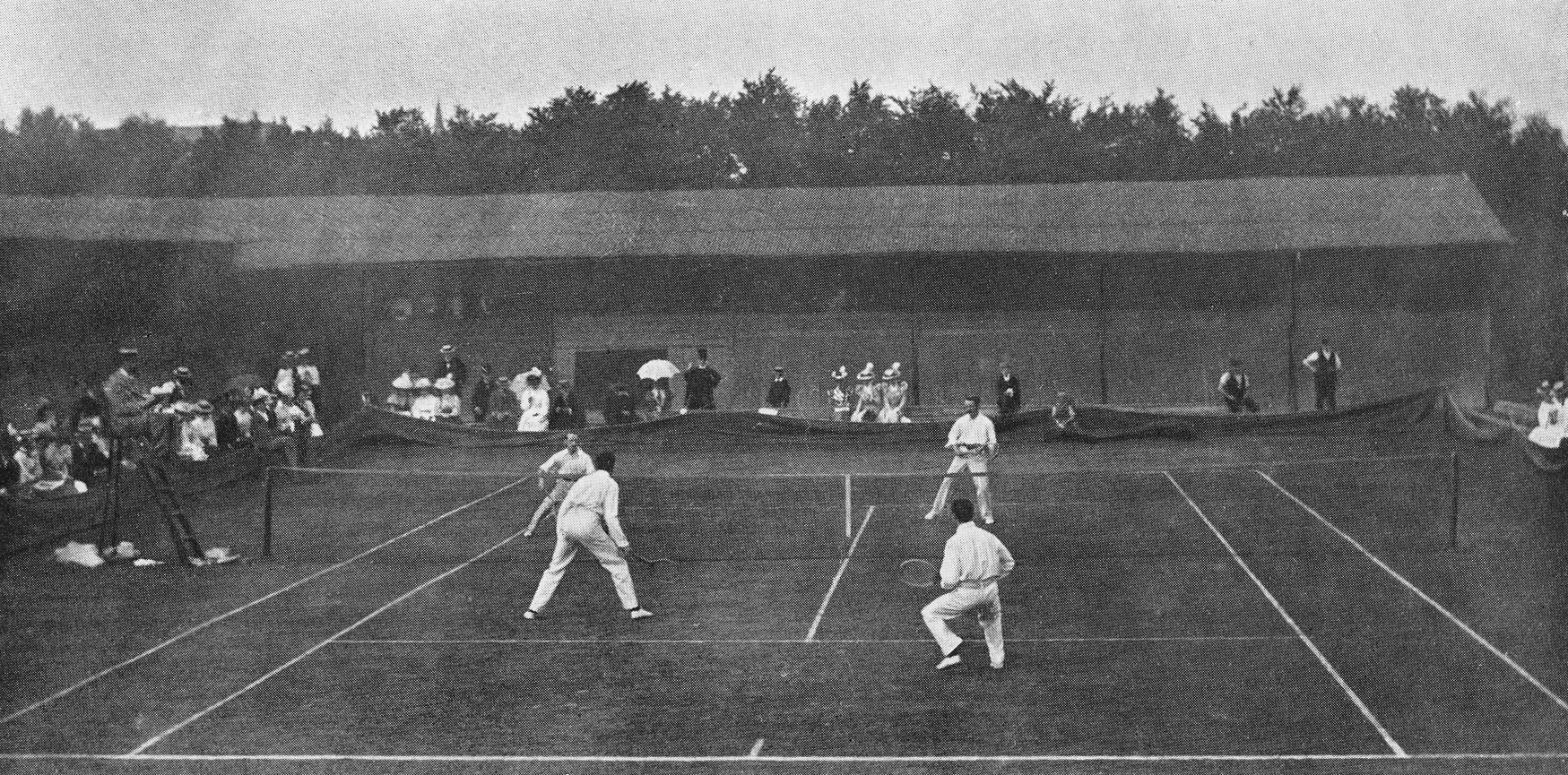
Gentlemen's doubles final at the 1897 Wimbledon Championships. Players shown are, at the near side, Reginald Doherty (left) and Laurence Doherty (right) and at the far side Herbert Baddeley (left) and Wilfred Baddeley (right).

The 1897 Wimbledon Championships was a tennis tournament that took place on the outdoor grass courts at the All England Lawn Tennis Club in Wimbledon, London, United Kingdom. The tournament ran from 21 June until 1 July. It was the 21st staging of the Wimbledon Championships, and the first Grand Slam tennis event of 1897. No matches were played on the first Tuesday to mark Queen Victoria's diamond jubilee. Reginald Doherty defeated Harold Mahony in the Challenge Round, and successfully defended his title for the next three years.

== Champions ==
=== Men's singles ===
(United Kingdom) Reginald Doherty defeated (United Kingdom) Harold Mahony, 6–4, 6–4, 6–3

=== Women's singles ===
(United Kingdom) Blanche Hillyard defeated (United Kingdom) Charlotte Cooper, 5–7, 7–5, 6–2

=== Men's doubles ===
(United Kingdom) Laurence Doherty / (United Kingdom) Reginald Doherty defeated (United Kingdom) Herbert Baddeley / (United Kingdom) Wilfred Baddeley, 6–4, 4–6, 8–6, 6–4

Preceded by 1896 U.S. National Championships	Grand Slams	Succeeded by 1897 U.S. National Championships
