= 1899 Wimbledon Championships =

- Date: 19–27 June
- Edition: 23rd
- Category: Grand Slam
- Surface: Grass
- Location: Worple Road; SW19, Wimbledon, London, United Kingdom
- Venue: All England Lawn Tennis and Croquet Club

Champions

Men's singles
- (United Kingdom) Reginald Doherty

Women's singles
- (United Kingdom) Blanche Hillyard

Men's doubles
- (United Kingdom) Laurence Doherty / (United Kingdom) Reginald Doherty
- Wimbledon Championships

The 1899 Wimbledon Championships took place on the outdoor grass courts at the All England Lawn Tennis and Croquet Club in Wimbledon, London, United Kingdom. The tournament ran from 19 June until 27 June. It was the 23rd staging of the Wimbledon Championships, and the first Grand Slam tennis event of 1899.

== Champions ==
=== Men's singles ===
(United Kingdom) Reginald Doherty defeated (United Kingdom) Arthur Gore, 1–6, 4–6, 6–3, 6–3, 6–3

=== Women's singles ===
(United Kingdom) Blanche Hillyard defeated (United Kingdom) Charlotte Cooper, 6–2, 6–3

=== Men's doubles ===
(United Kingdom) Laurence Doherty / (United Kingdom) Reginald Doherty defeated (United States) Clarence Hobart / (United Kingdom) Harold Nisbet, 7–5, 6–0, 6–2

Preceded by 1898 U.S. National Championships	Grand Slams	Succeeded by 1899 U.S. National Championships
