= Beryl Tulloch =

English tennis player (1876–1957)

- Full name: Minnie Beryl Tulloch
- Country (sports): GBR
- Born: 19 July 1876 Kensington, Middlesex, England
- Died: 1957 (age 81) Ampthill, Bedfordshire, England
- Turned pro: 1893 (amateur tour)
- Retired: 1920
- Plays: Left handed

Singles
- Career titles: 17

Grand Slam singles results
- Wimbledon: SF (1899, 1906)

Grand Slam mixed doubles results
- Wimbledon: QF (1914)

Minnie Beryl Tulloch (19 July 1876 – 1957) was an English tennis player. She was a two time singles semi finalist at the Wimbledon Championships in 1899 and 1906, and mixed doubles quarter finalist in 1914. She was active from 1893 to 1920 and won 17 career singles titles.

== Career ==
Minnie Beryl Tulloch was born on 19 July 1876 in Kensington, Middlesex, England. Her parents were Conrad Tulloch and Kate Rose.

Beryl played her first tournament at the Northern Championships in 1893 where she lost in the first round. She competed at the Wimbledon Championships sixteen times between 1898 and 1914. In the women's singles events her best results were as a semi finalist in 1899, a quarter finalist in 1900, a semi finalist in 1906 and a quarter finalist in 1908. In the mixed doubles events she was a quarter finalist in 1914 partnered with George Townshend Candy Watt.

Her other career singles highlights include winning the East of England Championships two times (1899–1900), the Essex Championships two times (1899–1900), the Suffolk Championships (1899), the West Sussex Championships (1900), Warwickshire Championships (1905), the West Hertfordshire Championships five times (1906, 1908–1911), the Middlesex Championships (1909), the Torquay Open (1911), the Boulogne International Championship (1912), the Bexhill-on-Sea Open (1913) and the Windlesham Open (1914).

In addition she was also a finalist at the Suffolk Championships (1900), Boulogne International Championship (1903), the North London Championships (1906), the Warwickshire Championships (1906), the Hampshire Championships (1909), Norwood Park (1910-1911), the Dieppe International Championship (1910) and the London Championships (1914). In 1920 she played her final singles tournament at the Carlisle Open where she reached the finals.

Beryl was a spinster she never married, her sister was Olive Bain (née; Tullock) who was also a tennis player. Beryl died in Ampthill, Bedfordshire, England in 1957.
