= 1899 Wimbledon Championships – Women's singles =

Women's singles
- 1899 Wimbledon Championships

Final
- Champion: (United Kingdom) Blanche Hillyard
- Runner-up: (United Kingdom) Charlotte Cooper
- Score: 6–2, 6–3

Details
- Draw: 17
- Seeds: –

Events
Singles	men	women
Doubles	men	women
← 1898 ·	Wimbledon Championships	· 1900 →

Blanche Hillyard defeated Ruth Durlacher 7–5, 6–8, 6–1 in the All Comers' Final, and then defeated the reigning champion Charlotte Cooper 6–2, 6–3 in the challenge round to win the ladies' singles tennis title at the 1899 Wimbledon Championships.

== Draw ==
=== Key ===
- Q = Qualifier
- WC = Wild card
- LL = Lucky loser
- Alt = Alternate
- SE = Special exempt
- PR = Protected ranking
- ITF = ITF entry
- JE = Junior exempt
- w/o = Walkover
- r = Retired
- d = Defaulted
- SR = Special ranking

=== Challenge round ===
Challenge round
(United Kingdom) Blanche Hillyard	6	6
(United Kingdom) Charlotte Cooper	2	3

=== All comers' finals ===
Semifinals
(United Kingdom) Ruth Durlacher	6	6
(United Kingdom) B Steedman	4	2
(United Kingdom) Blanche Hillyard	6	3	6
(United Kingdom) Beryl Tulloch	3	6	2

Final
(United Kingdom) Ruth Durlacher	5	8	1
(United Kingdom) Blanche Hillyard	7	6	6

=== Top half ===
First round
(United Kingdom) Ruth Winch	6	6
(United Kingdom) C Parsons-Smith	0	0

Second round
(United Kingdom) Muriel Robb	6	2	6
(United Kingdom) Maude Garfit	3	6	4
(United Kingdom) Ruth Durlacher	6	6
(United Kingdom) Mrs Tanner	0	0
(United Kingdom) Mrs HA Kirby	6	3	6
(United Kingdom) Alice Pickering	4	6	3
(United Kingdom) Bertha Steedman	6	7	8
(United Kingdom) R Winch	2	9	6

Quarterfinals
(United Kingdom) M Robb	1	7	3
(United Kingdom) R Durlacher	6	5	6
(United Kingdom) Mrs HA Kirby	6	2	2
(United Kingdom) B Steedman	4	6	6

Semifinals
(United Kingdom) R Durlacher	6	6
(United Kingdom) B Steedman	4	2

==== Bottom half ====
First round

Second round
(United Kingdom) Blanche Hillyard	6	6
(United Kingdom) H Smythe	3	0
(United Kingdom) Edith Austin	6	6
(United Kingdom) U Templeman	4	0
(United Kingdom) Beryl Tulloch	7	6
(United Kingdom) Miss Ireland	5	2
(United Kingdom) E.J. Bromfield	7	5	6
(United Kingdom) Ellen Thynne	5	7	2

Quarterfinals
(United Kingdom) B Hillyard	8	6
(United Kingdom) E Austin	6	4
(United Kingdom) B Tulloch	3	6	6
(United Kingdom) EJ Bromfield	6	2	1

Semifinals
(United Kingdom) B Hillyard	6	3	6
(United Kingdom) B Tulloch	3	6	2

Preceded by 1898 U.S. National Championships – Women's singles	Grand Slam women's singles	Succeeded by 1899 U.S. National Championships – Women's singles
