= 1895 U.S. National Championships (tennis) =

- Date: August 18–25 (M); June 25–29 (W)
- Edition: 15th
- Category: Grand Slam
- Surface: Grass
- Location: Newport, R.I., United States (M); Philadelphia, PA, United States (W)

Champions

Men's singles
- (United States) Fred Hovey

Women's singles
- (United States) Juliette Atkinson

Men's doubles
- (United States) Malcolm Chace / (United States) Robert Wrenn

Women's doubles
- (United States) Helen Hellwig / (United States) Juliette Atkinson

Mixed doubles
- (United States) Juliette Atkinson / (United States) Edwin P. Fischer
- U.S. National Championships

The 1895 U.S. National Championships (now known as the US Open) was a tennis tournament that took place in June and August of 1895. The women's tournament was held from June 25 to June 29 on the outdoor grass courts at the Philadelphia Cricket Club in Philadelphia, Pennsylvania. The men's tournament was held from August 18 to August 25 on the outdoor grass courts at the Newport Casino in Newport, Rhode Island. It was the 15th U.S. National Championships and the second Grand Slam tournament of the year.

== Finals ==
=== Men's singles ===
(United States) Fred Hovey defeated (United States) Robert Wrenn 6–3, 6–2, 6–4

=== Women's singles ===
(United States) Juliette Atkinson defeated (United States) Helen Hellwig 6–4, 6–2, 6–1

=== Men's doubles ===
(United States) Malcolm Chace / (United States) Robert Wrenn defeated (United States) Clarence Hobart / (United States) Fred Hovey 7–5, 6–1, 8–6

=== Women's doubles ===
(United States) Helen Hellwig / (United States) Juliette Atkinson defeated (United States) Elisabeth Moore / (United States) Amy Williams 6–2, 6–2, 12–10

=== Mixed doubles ===
(United States) Juliette Atkinson / (United States) Edwin P. Fischer defeated (United States) Amy Williams / (United States) Mantle Fielding 4–6, 8–6, 6–2

Preceded by 1895 Wimbledon Championships	Grand Slams	Succeeded by 1896 Wimbledon Championships
