= 1898 Wimbledon Championships – Men's doubles =

Men's doubles
- 1898 Wimbledon Championships

Final
- Champions: (United Kingdom) Laurence Doherty (United Kingdom) Reginald Doherty
- Runners-up: (United States) Clarence Hobart (United Kingdom) Harold Nisbet
- Score: 6–4, 6–4, 6–2

Details
- Draw: 14
- Seeds: –

Events
| Singles | men | women |
| Doubles | men | women |
| ← 1897 · | Wimbledon Championships | · 1899 → |

Clarence Hobart and Harold Nisbet defeated George Hillyard and Sydney Smith 2–6, 6–2, 6–2, 6–3 in the All Comers' Final, but the reigning champions Laurence Doherty and Reginald Doherty defeated Hobart and Nisbet 6–4, 6–4, 6–2 in the challenge round to win the gentlemen's doubles tennis title at the 1898 Wimbledon Championships.

== Draw ==
=== Key ===
- Q = Qualifier
- WC = Wild card
- LL = Lucky loser
- Alt = Alternate
- SE = Special exempt
- PR = Protected ranking
- ITF = ITF entry
- JE = Junior exempt
- w/o = Walkover
- r = Retired
- d = Defaulted
- SR = Special ranking

=== Challenge round ===
| Challenge round |
| (United States) Clarence Hobart (United Kingdom) Harold Nisbet | 4 | 4 | 2 |
| (United Kingdom) Laurence Doherty (United Kingdom) Reginald Doherty | 6 | 6 | 6 |

=== All Comers' ===
First round
(United Kingdom) Wilfred Milne (United Kingdom) William Taylor
(United Kingdom) David Hawes (United Kingdom) GL Orme | w/o
(United Kingdom) George Caridia (United Kingdom) George Simond | 3 | 6 | 10 | 1 | 6
(United Kingdom) Allan Pearson (United Kingdom) Frederick Plaskitt | 6 | 2 | 8 | 6 | 3
(United Kingdom) John Hickson (United Kingdom) Arthur Kirby | 6 | 6 | 2 | 6
(United States) Wylie Grant (United States) Parmly Paret | 2 | 4 | 6 | 3
(United Kingdom) George Greville (United Kingdom) Harold Mahony | 6 | 12 | 9
(United Kingdom) Herbert Roper Barrett (United Kingdom) Gillibrand Evered | 3 | 10 | 7
(United Kingdom) George Hillyard (United Kingdom) Sydney Smith | 6 | 6 | 6
(United Kingdom) JH Heche (United Kingdom) RF Leslie | 2 | 2 | 2
(United Kingdom) Arthur Gore (United Kingdom) George Mewburn | 7 | 6 | 7
(United Kingdom) P Pearson (United Kingdom) MRL White | 5 | 4 | 5

Quarterfinals
(United States) Clarence Hobart (United Kingdom) Harold Nisbet | 6 | 6 | 7
(United Kingdom) Wilfred Milne (United Kingdom) William Taylor | 2 | 3 | 5
(United Kingdom) George Caridia (United Kingdom) George Simond | 6 | 6 | 7
(United Kingdom) John Hickson (United Kingdom) Arthur Kirby | 2 | 3 | 5
(United Kingdom) George Greville (United Kingdom) Harold Mahony | 6 | 8 | 4 | 6 | 8
(United Kingdom) George Hillyard (United Kingdom) Sydney Smith | 3 | 10 | 6 | 2 | 6
(United Kingdom) Arthur Gore (United Kingdom) George Mewburn | 6 | 6 | 6
(United Kingdom) A Raleigh (United Kingdom) Arthur Norris | 1 | 1 | 2

Semifinals
(United States) Clarence Hobart (United Kingdom) Harold Nisbet | 6 | 10 | 6
(United Kingdom) George Caridia (United Kingdom) George Simond | 0 | 8 | 4
(United Kingdom) George Hillyard (United Kingdom) Sydney Smith | 6 | 5 | 6 | 7
(United Kingdom) Arthur Gore (United Kingdom) George Mewburn | 4 | 7 | 3 | 5

Final
(United States) Clarence Hobart (United Kingdom) Harold Nisbet | 2 | 6 | 6 | 6
(United Kingdom) George Hillyard (United Kingdom) Sydney Smith | 6 | 2 | 2 | 3
