= 1894 U.S. National Championships – Men's singles =

Men's singles
- 1894 U.S. National Championships

Final
- Champion: (United States) Robert Wrenn
- Runner-up: (United Kingdom) Manliffe Goodbody
- Score: 6–8, 6–1, 6–4, 6–4

Events
| Singles | men | women |
| Doubles | men | women |
| ← 1893 · | U.S. National Championships | · 1895 → |

Defending champion Robert Wrenn defeated Manliffe Goodbody in the challenge round, 6–8, 6–1, 6–4, 6–4 to win the men's singles tennis title at the 1894 U.S. National Championships. Goodbody became the first player from outside the United States to reach the challenge round.

== Draw ==
=== Challenge round ===
| Challenge round |
| (United States) R Wrenn | 6 | 6 | 6 | 6 |
| (United Kingdom) MF Goodbody | 8 | 1 | 4 | 4 |

=== Finals ===
Semifinals
(United States) JB Read | 6 | 0 | 0 | 1
(United Kingdom) MF Goodbody | 3 | 6 | 6 | 6
(United States) W Larned | 6 | 6 | 8
(United States) M Chace | 4 | 2 | 6

Final
(United Kingdom) MF Goodbody | 4 | 6 | 3 | 7 | 6
(United States) W Larned | 6 | 1 | 6 | 5 | 2

=== Earlier rounds ===
==== Section 1 ====
First round
(United States) S Thomson | 6 | 0 | 6 | 6
(United States) HW Warner | 2 | 6 | 1 | 2
W Parker | w/ | o
(United States) K McEnroe
(United States) S Howland | 6 | 6 | 6
WW Reece | 3 | 0 | 3
(United States) C Cragin | w/ | o
(United States) WG Herrick
(United States) C Bradley | w/ | o
(United States) CR Budlong
(United States) JB Read | 7 | 6 | 6
A Thomas | 5 | 2 | 1
(United States) G Crocker | 6 | 6 | 6
Mantle | 3 | 4 | 3

Second round
(United States) JC Davidson | 10 | 7 | 0 | 3 | 1
(United States) S Thomson | 8 | 5 | 6 | 6 | 6
W Parker | 6 | 6 | 6
(United States) S Howland | 4 | 3 | 4
(United States) C Cragin | 6 | 6 | 6
(United States) C Bradley | 1 | 2 | 2
(United States) JB Read | 7 | 6 | 1 | 3 | 7
(United States) G Crocker | 5 | 3 | 6 | 6 | 5

Third round
(United States) S Thomson | 8 | 4 | 4 | 6 | 6
W Parker | 6 | 6 | 6 | 4 | 3
(United States) C Cragin | 6 | 4 | 6 | 2
(United States) JB Read | 3 | 6 | 8 | 6

Quarterfinals
(United States) S Thomson | 3 | 1 | 2
(United States) JB Read | 6 | 6 | 6

==== Section 2 ====
First round
(United States) AE Foote | 6 | 6 | 6
(United States) QA Shaw | 2 | 2 | 4
(United States) J Howland | 4 | 6 | 7 | 6 | 6
(United States) GC Hinckley | 6 | 8 | 5 | 1 | 2
(United States) C Hobart | 6 | 6 | 6
(United States) S Reed | 1 | 2 | 1
(United States) EP Fischer | 6 | 7 | 6
(United States) J Terry | 1 | 5 | 2
(United States) AWS Post | 6 | 6 | 6
(United States) E Stille | 1 | 4 | 2
(United States) F Hovey | 6 | 6 | 6
(United States) R Sands | 2 | 0 | 1
(United States) G Brown | w/ | o
EA Wilkie
(United Kingdom) MF Goodbody | 6 | 6 | 6
(United Kingdom) R Rowan | 3 | 2 | 1

Second round
(United States) AE Foote | 6 | 6 | 6
(United States) J Howland | 4 | 1 | 2
(United States) C Hobart | 7 | 6 | 6
(United States) EP Fischer | 5 | 4 | 4
(United States) AWS Post | 1 | 2 | 2
(United States) F Hovey | 6 | 6 | 6
(United States) G Brown | 1 | 2 | 3
(United Kingdom) MF Goodbody | 6 | 6 | 6

Third round
(United States) AE Foote | 6 | 1 | 3 | 3
(United States) C Hobart | 2 | 6 | 6 | 6
(United States) F Hovey | 6 | 4 | 1 | 6 | 2
(United Kingdom) MF Goodbody | 2 | 6 | 6 | 4 | 6

Quarterfinals
(United States) C Hobart | 2 | 2 | 6 | 6 | 6
(United Kingdom) MF Goodbody | 6 | 6 | 2 | 3 | 8

==== Section 3 ====
First round
(United States) R Stevens | w/ | o
(United States) CM Nast
(United States) G Herrick | 6 | 6 | 6
HH Dickey | 2 | 2 | 1
GW Lee | 6 | 6 | 6
(United States) LE Ware | 3 | 3 | 1
(United States) VG Hall | 6 | 1 | 6 | 3 | 6
(United States) EL Hall | 4 | 6 | 2 | 6 | 3
RB Cutting | 6 | 6 | 6
FW Taylor | 4 | 4 | 3
(United States) C Neel | 6 | 6 | 6
(United States) A Codman | 0 | 1 | 0
(United States) W Larned | 6 | 6 | 6
OM Bostwick | 3 | 3 | 4
NNH Lord | 6 | 6 | 4 | 6
(United States) WC Grant | 1 | 2 | 6 | 3

Second round
(United States) R Stevens | 6 | 6 | 6
(United States) G Herrick | 1 | 4 | 3
GW Lee | 4 | 7 | 1 | 3
(United States) VG Hall | 6 | 5 | 6 | 6
RB Cutting | 3 | 1 | 1
(United States) C Neel | 6 | 6 | 6
(United States) W Larned | 6 | 6 | 6
NNH Lord | 2 | 0 | 1

Third round
(United States) R Stevens | 6 | 6 | 6
(United States) VG Hall | 2 | 2 | 3
(United States) C Neel | 3 | 6 | 3 | 6 | 4
(United States) W Larned | 6 | 2 | 6 | 3 | 6

Quarterfinals
(United States) R Stevens | 2 | 6 | 3 | 6
(United States) W Larned | 6 | 4 | 6 | 8

==== Section 4 ====
First round
B Watson | 1 | 6 | 6 | 6
H Kendall | 6 | 0 | 4 | 3
(United States) D Miller | 6 | 6 | 6
F Donahue | 1 | 4 | 2
(United States) CE Sands | 6 | 6 | 6
(United States) R Hickox | 2 | 1 | 0
SL Smith | 6 | 6 | 6
(United States) LJ Grant | 1 | 0 | 1
(United States) W McKittrick | w/ | o
(United States) A Thomson
(United States) AL Williston | 6 | 6 | 6 | 6
(United States) E Wrenn | 4 | 2 | 8 | 4
(United States) M Chace | 6 | 6 | 6
F. Morgan | 3 | 2 | 2

Second round
B Watson | 3 | 1 | 6
(United States) D Miller | 6 | 6 | 8
(United States) CE Sands | 4 | 6 | 6 | 6
SL Smith | 6 | 3 | 2 | 1
(United States) W McKittrick | 6 | 3 | 4 | 4
(United States) AL Williston | 3 | 6 | 6 | 6
(United States) M Chace | 5 | 6 | 6 | 6
(United States) H Avery | 7 | 3 | 2 | 4

Third round
(United States) D Miller | 1 | 3 | 1
(United States) CE Sands | 6 | 6 | 6
(United States) AL Williston | 0 | 1 | 2
(United States) M Chace | 6 | 6 | 6

Quarterfinals
(United States) CE Sands | 5 | 2 | 5
(United States) M Chace | 7 | 6 | 7

== Sources ==
- Albiero, Alessandro; Carta, Andrea (2010). The Grand Slam Record Book Vol. 1. Monte Porzio Catone: Effepi Libri. p. 577. ISBN 978-88-6002-017-8.

| Preceded by 1894 Wimbledon Championships – Men's Singles | Grand Slam men's singles | Succeeded by 1895 Wimbledon Championships – Men's singles |
