= 1894 U.S. National Championships (tennis) =

- Date: August 20–27 (M); June 12–16 (W)
- Edition: 14th
- Category: Grand Slam
- Surface: Grass
- Location: Newport, R.I., United States (M); Philadelphia, PA, United States (W)

Champions

Men's singles
- (United States) Robert Wrenn

Women's singles
- (United States) Helen Hellwig

Men's doubles
- (United States) Clarence Hobart / (United States) Fred Hovey

Women's doubles
- (United States) Helen Hellwig / (United States) Juliette Atkinson

Mixed doubles
- (United States) Juliette Atkinson / (United States) Edwin P. Fischer
- U.S. National Championships

The 1894 U.S. National Championships (now known as the US Open) was a tennis tournament that took place in June and August of 1894. The women's singles and doubles tournament as well as the mixed doubles event was held from June 12 to June 16 on the outdoor grass courts at the Philadelphia Cricket Club in Philadelphia, Pennsylvania. The men's tournament was held from August 20 to August 27 on the outdoor grass courts at the Newport Casino in Newport, Rhode Island. It was the 14th U.S. National Championships and the second Grand Slam tournament of the year.

== Finals ==
=== Men's singles ===
(United States) Robert Wrenn defeated (United Kingdom) Manliffe Goodbody 6–8, 6–1, 6–4, 6–4

=== Women's singles ===
(United States) Helen Hellwig defeated (United States) Aline Terry 7–5, 3–6, 6–0, 3–6, 6–3

=== Men's doubles ===
(United States) Clarence Hobart / (United States) Fred Hovey defeated (United States) Carr Neel / (United States) Sam Neel 6–3, 8–6, 6–1

=== Women's doubles ===
(United States) Helen Hellwig / (United States) Juliette Atkinson defeated (United States) Annabella Wistar / (United States) Amy Williams 6–4, 8–6, 6–2

=== Mixed doubles ===
(United States) Juliette Atkinson / (United States) Edwin P. Fischer defeated (United States) Mrs. McFadden / (United States) Gustav Remak 6–3, 6–2, 6–1

Preceded by 1894 Wimbledon Championships	Grand Slams	Succeeded by 1895 Wimbledon Championships
