= J. Bertram Read =

American tennis player

JB Read
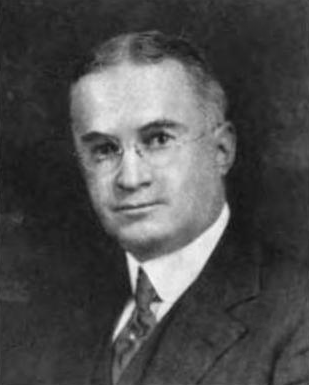
- Full name: John Bertram Read
- Born: December 10, 1870 Cambridge, Massachusetts, US
- Died: April 22, 1929 (aged 58) Cambridge, Massachusetts, US
- Turned pro: 1892 (amateur tour)
- Retired: 1906

Singles

Grand Slam singles results
- US Open: SF (1894)

John Bertram Read (December 10, 1870 – April 22, 1929) was an American tennis player and businessman.

== Early life and education ==
J. Bertram Read was born in Cambridge, Massachusetts on December 10, 1870.

Read studied at Cambridge Latin School and Harvard College, graduating from the latter in 1895. While studying at Harvard, he won the 1893 Senter House Cup.

== Tennis career ==
In March 1894, he was elected secretary of the Harvard Lawn Tennis Association.

Read reached the semifinals of the U.S. National Championships in 1894.

== Business career ==
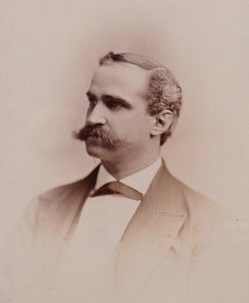
Read's father John in the 1880s

In 1914, Read took over the family business of William Read & Sons, a Massachusetts-based gun and sporting goods store originally founded as Lane & Read in 1826. Read sold the business in 1920 and was later connected with the company Blyth & Co.

== Personal life ==
Read was the son of John Read, a Cambridge native who served as a member of the Massachusetts House of Representatives and the Massachusetts Senate during the 1880s and 1890s. He had two brothers, William Read II and Harold W. Read.

Read and his wife had two sons (John Jr. and Richard W.) and one daughter (Eleanor Goodwin). He died in Cambridge on April 22, 1929, at the age of 58 following months of illness.
