= 1898 Wimbledon Championships =

- Date: 20 – 28 June
- Edition: 22nd
- Category: Grand Slam
- Surface: Grass
- Location: Worple Road; SW19, Wimbledon, London, United Kingdom
- Venue: All England Lawn Tennis Club

Champions

Men's singles
- (United Kingdom) Reginald Doherty

Women's singles
- (United Kingdom) Charlotte Cooper

Men's doubles
- (United Kingdom) Laurence Doherty / (United Kingdom) Reginald Doherty
- Wimbledon Championships

The 1898 Wimbledon Championships was a tennis tournament that took place on the outdoor grass courts at the All England Lawn Tennis Club in Wimbledon, London, United Kingdom. The tournament ran from 20 June until 28 June. It was the 22nd staging of the Wimbledon Championships, and the first Grand Slam tennis event of 1898.

== Champions ==
=== Men's singles ===
(United Kingdom) Reginald Doherty defeated (United Kingdom) Laurence Doherty, 6–3, 6–3, 2–6, 5–7, 6–1

=== Women's singles ===
(United Kingdom) Charlotte Cooper defeated (United Kingdom) Louisa Martin, 6–4, 6–4

=== Men's doubles ===
(United Kingdom) Laurence Doherty / (United Kingdom) Reginald Doherty defeated (United States) Clarence Hobart / (United Kingdom) Harold Nisbet, 6–4, 6–4, 6–2

Preceded by 1897 U.S. National Championships	Grand Slams	Succeeded by 1898 U.S. National Championships
