= Tuxedo Invitation =

Defunct tennis tournament
- Tour: USNLTA Circuit
- Founded: 1891; 134 years ago
- Abolished: 1914; 111 years ago
- Location: Tuxedo Park, New York, United States
- Venue: Tuxedo Club
- Surface: Grass

The Tuxedo Invitation was men's USNLTA affiliated grass court Invitational tennis tournament founded in 1891. Also known as the Tuxedo Cup, the event was played at the Tuxedo Club, Tuxedo Park, New York, United States up till the start of World War One.

== Finals ==
=== Singles ===
(incomplete roll)

Year	Winners	Runners-up	Score
1891	(United States) Edward L. Hall	(United States) Albert Empie Wright	6-4, 4-6, 6-4, 4-6, 6-0
1892	(United States) Edward L. Hall (2)	(United States) Bill Larned	6-4, 6-4, 10-8
1893	(United States) Clarence Hobart	(United States) Edward L. Hall	6-3, 6-3, 4-6, 6-3
1894	(United States) Malcolm G. Chace	(United States) Clarence Hobart	8-6, 0-6, 6-1, 4-6, 6-3
1895	(United States) Malcolm G. Chace (2)	(United States) Bill Larned	6-2, 9-7, 6-0
1896	(United States) Edwin P. Fischer	(United States) Malcolm G. Chace	4-6, 6-2, 6-4, 6-4
1897	(United States) Edwin P. Fischer (2)	(United States) Malcolm G. Chace	4-6, 6-2, 6-4, 6-4
1898-1900	Not held		
1901	(United States) John C. Davidson	(United States) Edwin P. Fischer	walkover
