= Blandy Experimental Farm Historic District =

Historic district in Virginia, United States

- U.S. National Register of Historic Places
- U.S. Historic district
- Virginia Landmarks Register
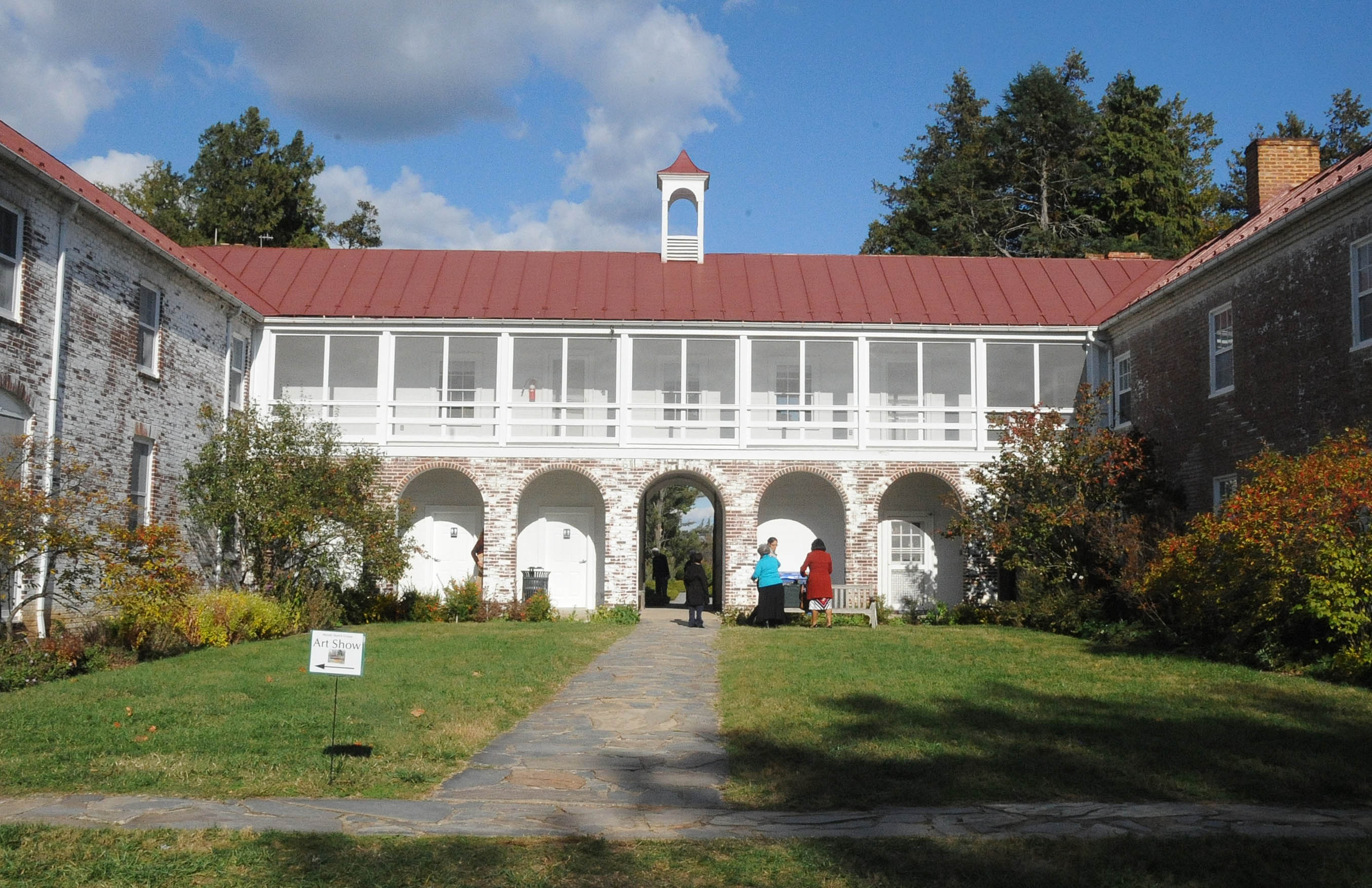
- Slave quarters

- Location within Northern Virginia Location within Virginia Location within the United States
- Location: US 50/17 S side, 4 mi. W of the Shenandoah R., Boyce, Virginia
- Coordinates: 39°3′36″N 78°3′53″W
- Area: 712 acres (288 ha)
- Built: c. 1825
- Architectural style: Colonial Revival, Bungalow/craftsman, Federal
- NRHP reference No.: 92001580
- VLR No.: 021-0550

Significant dates
- Added to NRHP: November 12, 1992
- Designated VLR: September 15, 1992

Blandy Experimental Farm Historic District is a national historic district located adjacent to The Tuleyries at Boyce, Clarke County, Virginia. It encompasses 15 contributing buildings, 1 contributing site, and 1 contributing structure. They include a large, two-story, brick slave's quarters built about 1825; a stone and brick stables that was later converted into a dwelling; a turn-of-the-20th-century farmhouse and its associated agricultural and domestic related outbuildings; a late-19th century vernacular hall-parlor-plan house; two historic dwelling sites; as well as orchards and fields of improved pasture.

Graham F. Blandy bequeathed 700 acres of his approximately 900-acre estate to the University of Virginia, which accepted it after his death in 1926. The University began its program of agricultural biology at Blandy in 1927, and converted part of the landscape into an arboretum. Dr. Orland E. White planted began planting the Arboretum in 1929, and upon his retirement in 1955 it was named the Orland E. White Research Arboretum. In 1986, the Virginia general assembly designated the property the State Arboretum of Virginia.

The slaves' quarters, referred to as the Quarters, was converted into laboratories and student and faculty housing. In 1941, the Quarters building was greatly enlarged with the addition of three Colonial Revival wings. This addition created a U-shaped building with the original Quarters section as the east wing. A research greenhouse was built at the same time.

It was listed on the National Register of Historic Places in 1992.

== Gallery ==
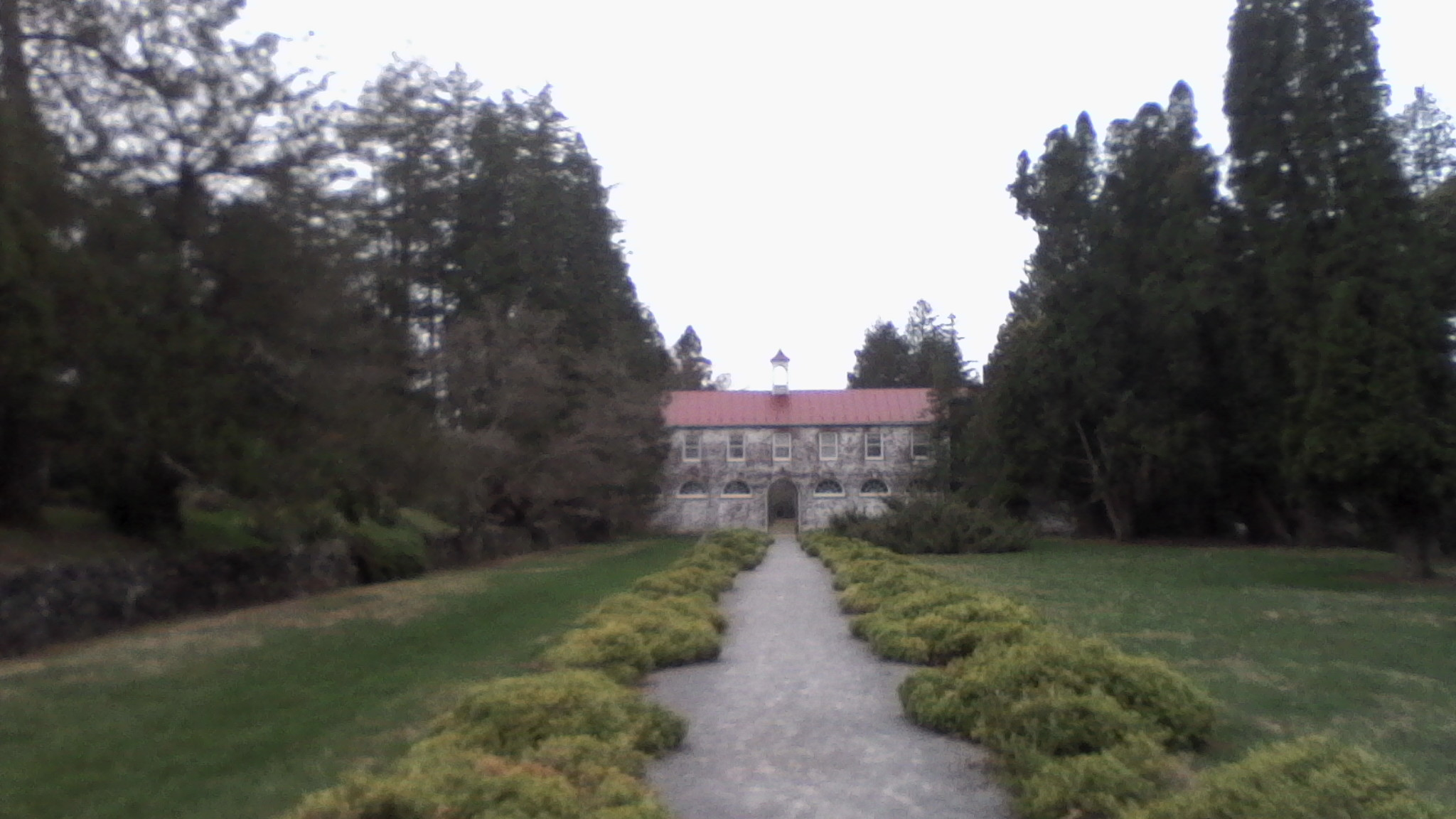
Historic Quarters

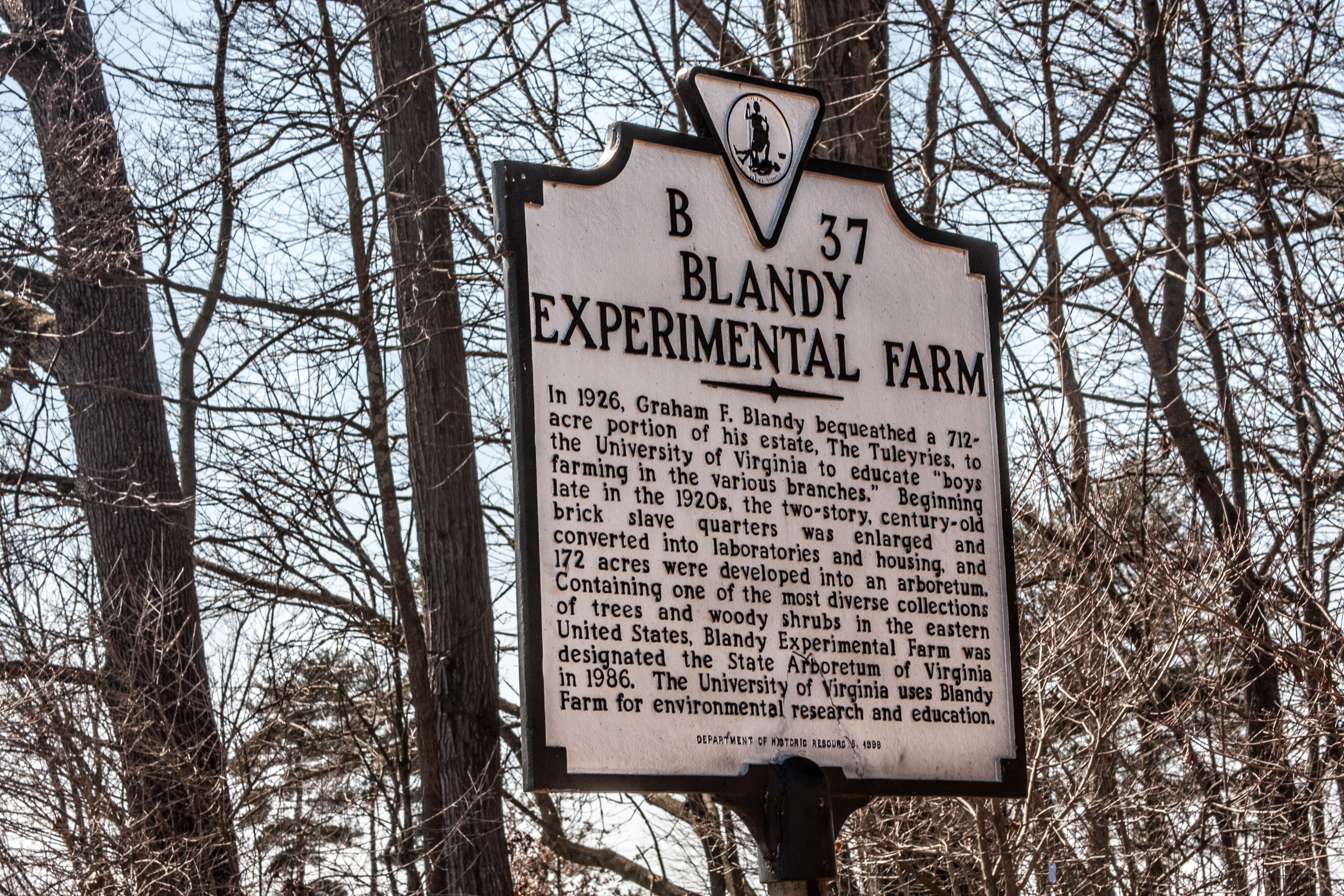
Historical Marker

== See also ==
- Orland E. White Research Arboretum
