= 1898 Wimbledon Championships – Women's singles =

Women's singles
- 1898 Wimbledon Championships

Final
- Champion: (United Kingdom) Charlotte Cooper
- Runner-up: (United Kingdom) Louisa Martin
- Score: 6–4, 6–4

Details
- Draw: 18
- Seeds: –

Events
Singles	men	women
Doubles	men	women
← 1897 ·	Wimbledon Championships	· 1899 →

Charlotte Cooper defeated Louisa Martin 6–4, 6–4 in the all comers' final to win the ladies' singles tennis title at the 1898 Wimbledon Championships. The reigning champion Blanche Hillyard did not defend her title.

== Draw ==
=== Key ===
- Q = Qualifier
- WC = Wild card
- LL = Lucky loser
- Alt = Alternate
- SE = Special exempt
- PR = Protected ranking
- ITF = ITF entry
- JE = Junior exempt
- w/o = Walkover
- r = Retired
- d = Defaulted
- SR = Special ranking

=== All comers' finals ===
Semifinals
(United Kingdom) Ruth Legh	w/o
(United Kingdom) Louisa Martin
(United Kingdom) Edith Austin	4	1
(United Kingdom) Charlotte Cooper	6	6

Final
(United Kingdom) Louisa Martin	4	4
(United Kingdom) Charlotte Cooper	6	6

=== Top half ===
First round
(United Kingdom) ER Morgan	8	4	8
(United Kingdom) Edith Bromfield	6	6	6

Second round
(United Kingdom) C Morgan	6	6
(United Kingdom) Beryl Tulloch	4	2
(United Kingdom) Ruth Legh	6	6
(United Kingdom) Henrietta Horncastle	2	2
(United Kingdom) Louisa Martin
(United Kingdom) Miss Ireland	w/o
(New Zealand) Hilda Hitchins	1	1
(United Kingdom) ER Morgan	6	6

Quarterfinals
(United Kingdom) C Morgan	0	1
(United Kingdom) R Legh	6	6
(United Kingdom) L Martin	6	6
(United Kingdom) ER Morgan	2	0

Semifinals
(United Kingdom) R Legh	w/o
(United Kingdom) L Martin

=== Bottom half ===
First round
(United Kingdom) Edith Austin	7	6
(United Kingdom) Mrs HA Kirby	5	2

Second round
(United Kingdom) E Austin	6	6
(United Kingdom) Ellen Thynne	1	0
(United Kingdom) Alice Pickering	6	6	4
(United Kingdom) Ruth Dyas	8	2	6
(United Kingdom) HI Harper	1	2
(United Kingdom) Bertha Steedman	6	6
(United Kingdom) H Smythe	2	4
(United Kingdom) Charlotte Cooper	6	6

Quarterfinals
(United Kingdom) E Austin	4	6	6
(United Kingdom) R Dyas	6	3	4
(United Kingdom) B Steedman	6	3	4
(United Kingdom) C Cooper	4	6	6

Semifinals
(United Kingdom) E Austin	4	1
(United Kingdom) C Cooper	6	6

Preceded by 1897 U.S. National Championships – Women's singles	Grand Slam women's singles	Succeeded by 1898 U.S. National Championships – Women's singles
