= 1897 Wimbledon Championships – Men's doubles =

Men's doubles
- 1897 Wimbledon Championships

Final
- Champions: (United Kingdom) Laurence Doherty (United Kingdom) Reginald Doherty
- Runners-up: (United Kingdom) Herbert Baddeley (United Kingdom) Wilfred Baddeley
- Score: 6–4, 4–6, 8–6, 6–4

Details
- Draw: 14
- Seeds: –

Events
| Singles | men | women |
| Doubles | men | women |
| ← 1896 · | Wimbledon Championships | · 1898 → |

Laurence Doherty and Reginald Doherty defeated Clement Cazalet and Sydney Smith 6–2 7–5 2–6 6–2 in the All Comers' Final, and then defeated the reigning champions Herbert Baddeley and Wilfred Baddeley 6–4, 4–6, 8–6, 6–4 in the challenge round to win the gentlemen's doubles tennis title at the 1897 Wimbledon Championships.

== Draw ==
=== Key ===
- Q = Qualifier
- WC = Wild card
- LL = Lucky loser
- Alt = Alternate
- SE = Special exempt
- PR = Protected ranking
- ITF = ITF entry
- JE = Junior exempt
- w/o = Walkover
- r = Retired
- d = Defaulted
- SR = Special ranking

=== Challenge round ===
| Challenge Round |
| (United Kingdom) Laurence Doherty (United Kingdom) Reginald Doherty | 6 | 4 | 8 | 6 |
| (United Kingdom) Herbert Baddeley (United Kingdom) Wilfred Baddeley | 4 | 6 | 6 | 4 |

=== All Comers' ===
First round
(United Kingdom) Laurence Doherty (United Kingdom) Reginald Doherty | 6 | 6 | 6
(United Kingdom) Arthur Cronin (United Kingdom) W Wallace | 0 | 1 | 2
(United Kingdom) George Greville (United Kingdom) Harold Nisbet | 6 | 6 | 6
(United Kingdom) Wilfred Milne (United Kingdom) GL Orme | 3 | 4 | 3
(United Kingdom) George Hillyard (United Kingdom) Harold Mahony | 6 | 6 | 6
(United Kingdom) Archibald McNair (United Kingdom) Roderick McNair | 3 | 1 | 1
(United Kingdom) Gillibrand Evered (United Kingdom) R Sheldon
(United Kingdom) Arthur Gore (United Kingdom) AN Other | w/o
(United Kingdom) Charles Simond (United Kingdom) George Simond | 6 | 6 | 6
(United Kingdom) G Tree (United Kingdom) Alfred Crawley | 2 | 0 | 1
(United Kingdom) Arthur Riseley (United Kingdom) Frank Riseley | 6 | 6 | 3 | 6
(United Kingdom) Frederick Plaskitt (United Kingdom) Alfred Taylor | 1 | 1 | 6 | 2

Quarterfinals
(United Kingdom) Wilberforce Eaves (United Kingdom) CH Martin | 0 | 5 | 4
(United Kingdom) Laurence Doherty (United Kingdom) Reginald Doherty | 6 | 7 | 6
(United Kingdom) George Greville (United Kingdom) Harold Nisbet | 6 | 2 | 5 | 2
(United Kingdom) George Hillyard (United Kingdom) Harold Mahony | 4 | 6 | 7 | 6
(United Kingdom) Gillibrand Evered (United Kingdom) R Sheldon
(United Kingdom) Charles Simond (United Kingdom) George Simond | w/o
(United Kingdom) Arthur Riseley (United Kingdom) Frank Riseley | 4 | 6 | 2 | 6 | 4
(United Kingdom) Clement Cazalet (United Kingdom) Sydney Smith | 6 | 4 | 6 | 3 | 6

Semifinals
(United Kingdom) Laurence Doherty (United Kingdom) Reginald Doherty | 6 | 6 | 4 | 6
(United Kingdom) George Hillyard (United Kingdom) Harold Mahony | 3 | 4 | 6 | 4
(United Kingdom) Gillibrand Evered (United Kingdom) R Sheldon | 1 | 1 | 2
(United Kingdom) Clement Cazalet (United Kingdom) Sydney Smith | 6 | 6 | 6

Final
(United Kingdom) Laurence Doherty (United Kingdom) Reginald Doherty | 6 | 7 | 2 | 6
(United Kingdom) Clement Cazalet (United Kingdom) Sydney Smith | 2 | 5 | 6 | 2
