= 1897 Wimbledon Championships – Women's singles =

Women's singles
- 1897 Wimbledon Championships

Final
- Champion: (United Kingdom) Blanche Hillyard
- Runner-up: (United Kingdom) Charlotte Cooper
- Score: 5–7, 7–5, 6–2

Details
- Draw: 7
- Seeds: –

Events
| Singles | men | women |
| Doubles | men | women |
| ← 1896 · | Wimbledon Championships | · 1898 → |

Blanche Hillyard defeated Alice Pickering 6–2, 7–5 in the All Comers' Final, and then defeated the reigning champion Charlotte Cooper 5–7, 7–5, 6–2 in the challenge round to win the ladies' singles tennis title at the 1897 Wimbledon Championships.

== Draw ==
=== Key ===
- Q = Qualifier
- WC = Wild card
- LL = Lucky loser
- Alt = Alternate
- SE = Special exempt
- PR = Protected ranking
- ITF = ITF entry
- JE = Junior exempt
- w/o = Walkover
- r = Retired
- d = Defaulted
- SR = Special ranking

=== Challenge round ===
| Challenge Round |
| (United Kingdom) Blanche Hillyard | 5 | 7 | 6 |
| (United Kingdom) Charlotte Cooper | 7 | 5 | 2 |

=== All Comers' ===
Quarterfinals
(United Kingdom) Blanche Hillyard | 6 | 6
(United Kingdom) Edith Austin | 0 | 1
(United Kingdom) Henrietta Horncastle | 12 | 6
(United Kingdom) Ellen Thynne | 10 | 4
(United Kingdom) Ruth Dyas | 6 | 6
(United Kingdom) Edith Bromfield | 0 | 3

Semifinals
(United Kingdom) Blanche Hillyard
(United Kingdom) Henrietta Horncastle | w/o
(United Kingdom) Ruth Dyas | 4 | 6 | 1
(United Kingdom) Alice Pickering | 6 | 4 | 6

Final
(United Kingdom) Blanche Hillyard | 6 | 7
(United Kingdom) Alice Pickering | 2 | 5

| Preceded by 1896 U.S. National Championships – Women's singles | Grand Slam women's singles | Succeeded by 1897 U.S. National Championships – Women's singles |
