= Orland E. White Research Arboretum =

Arboretum in Boyce, Virginia

Coordinates: 39.063°N 78.0639°W

State Arboretum of Virginia
- Orland E. White Research Arboretum
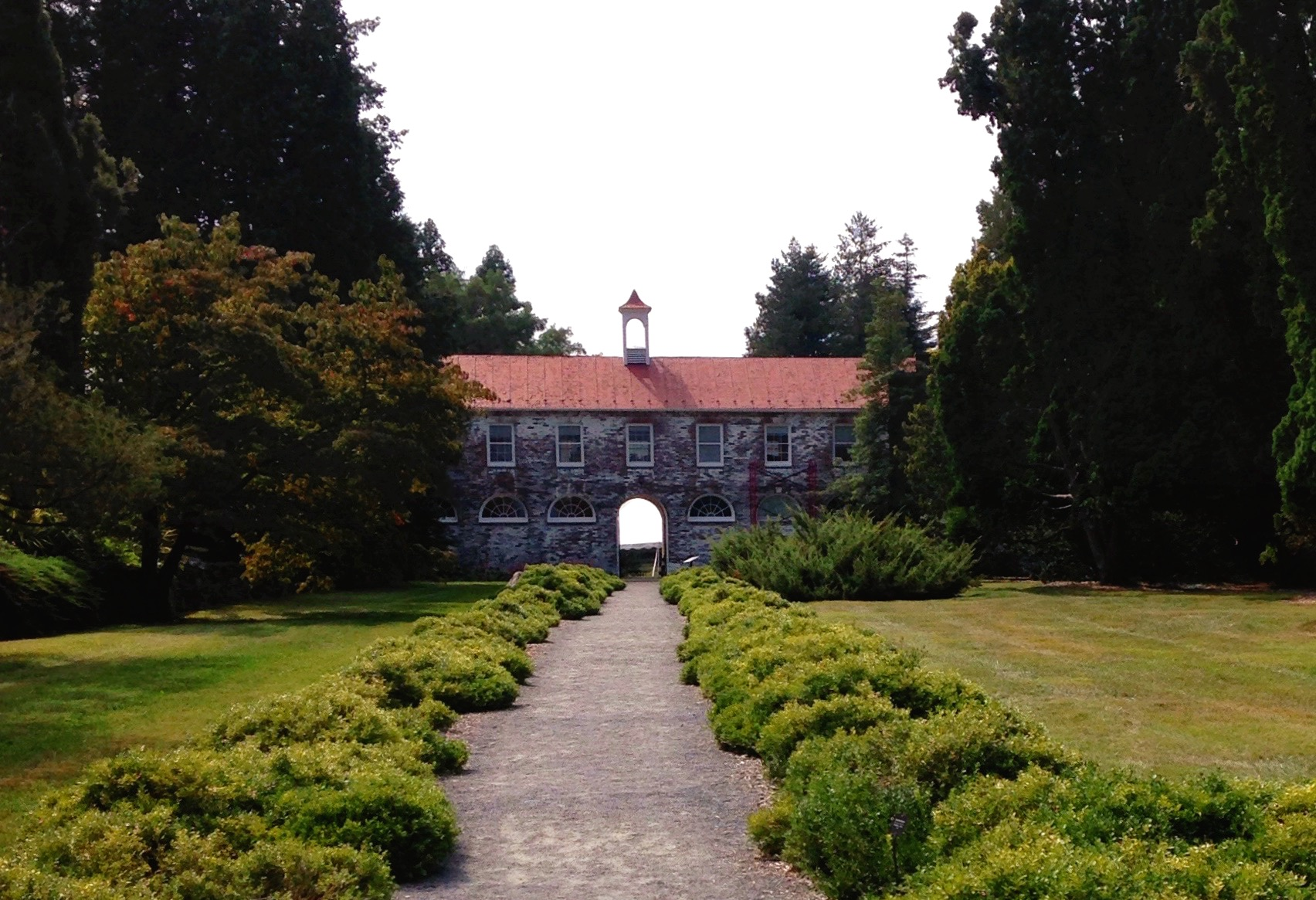
- Interactive map of State Arboretum of Virginia
- Type: Arboretum
- Location: 400 Blandy Farm Lane, Boyce, Virginia
- Area: 172 acres (70 ha)
- Operator: University of Virginia
- Species: 1,000
- Website: Official website

The Orland E. White Arboretum, officially the State Arboretum of Virginia, is an arboretum (172 acres) operated by the University of Virginia as part of the Blandy Experimental Farm (700 acres). It is located at 400 Blandy Farm Lane, Boyce, Virginia, and open to visitors daily from dawn to dusk without fee.

Graham F. Blandy bequeathed 700 acres of his 900-acre estate known as Blandy Farm to Virginia to use horticultural research. The farm's first director, Orland Emile White, established the arboretum a year after Blandy's death and upon White's retirement in 1955 it was named in his honor. Early research focused on cytological reconstruction of plant phylogenies and the consequences of irradiation-induced mutations. It became the official State Arboretum in 1986.

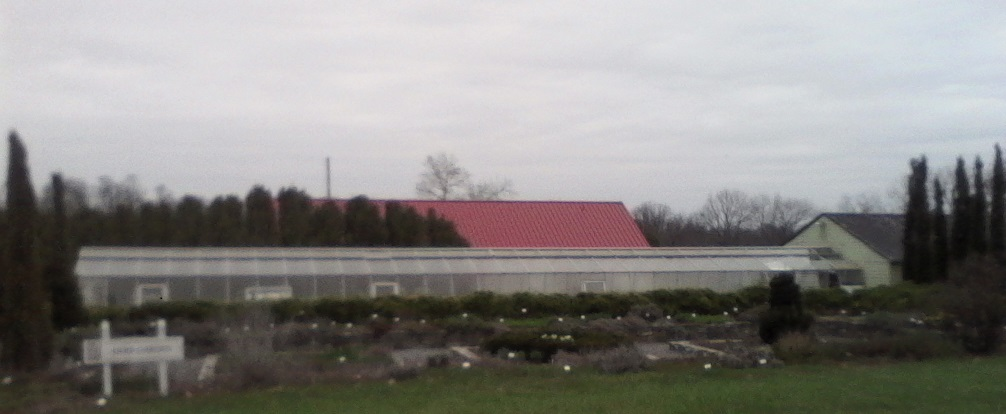
Greenhouse and herb garden early spring

Today the arboretum is maintained primarily for environmental research and education for university, K-12 and general audiences. It contains more than 8,000 trees and woody shrubs, representing over 1,000 species and cultivated varieties of plants in 50 plant families. Of particular interest are its collection of boxwood cultivars (said to be the largest in North America) and its pine collection, representing over half of the world's species. Other arboretum features include a Ginkgo biloba grove (more than 300 trees), the Virginia Native Plant Trail (established 1997), extensive meadows, and plantings of azalea, beech, buckeye, catalpa, Cedar of Lebanon, crabapple, holly, lilac, linden, magnolia, maple, stuartia, and viburnum.

== See also ==
- List of botanical gardens in the United States
