= Philip Pearson (tennis) =

British tennis player

- Full name: Philip Graeme Pearson
- Country (sports): United Kingdom
- Born: 1878 London, United Kingdom
- Died: 9 June 1903 (aged 25) Fatehgarh, Bengal, India
- Turned pro: 1896 (amateur tour)
- Retired: 1903 (due to death)

Singles

Grand Slam singles results
- Wimbledon: QF (1899)

Philip Pearson (1878–1903) was a British tennis player with a short career at the turn of the 20th century. At Wimbledon in 1898, Pearson lost to Harold Mahony in round three. In 1899 Pearson beat Frederick Plaskitt and Major Ritchie before losing in the quarterfinals to Arthur Gore. In 1901 he lost his opening match to Herbert Roper Barrett. In 1899 Pearson won the Bournemouth tournament and he also won the Surrey Championships in 1901 and the Bengal Championships in 1902. Pearson died in India in 1903 aged just 25.
