= William Chapman White =

William Chapman White (February 20, 1903 – November 28, 1955) was an American foreign correspondent in the 1930s who became a columnist for the New York Times and the New York Herald Tribune. He is known especially for his 1954 book, Adirondack Country. His connection with the Adirondack Mountains was through his marriage to Ruth Morris, daughter of the theatrical agent, William Morris, founder of the William Morris Agency who owned a "cure camp" on Lake Colby in Saranac Lake, New York. The Adirondack Research Room of the Saranac Lake Free Library is named for him.

== Bibliography ==
His books include:

- These Russians (Scribner, 1931)
- Mouseknees (1939)
- Adirondack Country (ISBN 978-0-8156019-3-7) (1954)
- Just About Everything in the Adirondacks (ISBN 978-0-8156802-8-4) (1960)
