= Princeton Alumni Weekly =

Alumni magazine of Princeton University

- Cover of the first issue (April 7, 1900)
- Editor: Peter Barzilai
- Categories: Alumni magazine
- Frequency: 11 times a year
- Circulation: 95,000
- Publisher: The Trustees of Princeton University
- First issue: April 7, 1900
- Country: United States
- Based in: Princeton, New Jersey
- Language: English
- Website: http://paw.princeton.edu/
- ISSN: 0149-9270

The Princeton Alumni Weekly (PAW) is a magazine published for the alumni of Princeton University. It was founded in 1900 and, until 1977, it was the only weekly college alumni magazine in the United States. Upon changing to biweekly publication in 1977, the number of issues per year decreased from twenty-eight to twenty-one, and then later decreased to seventeen. It remains the most frequently published alumni magazine in the world, currently publishing 11 times per year.
