= Helena R. Hellwig Pouch =

American tennis player

Helena Hellwig Pouch
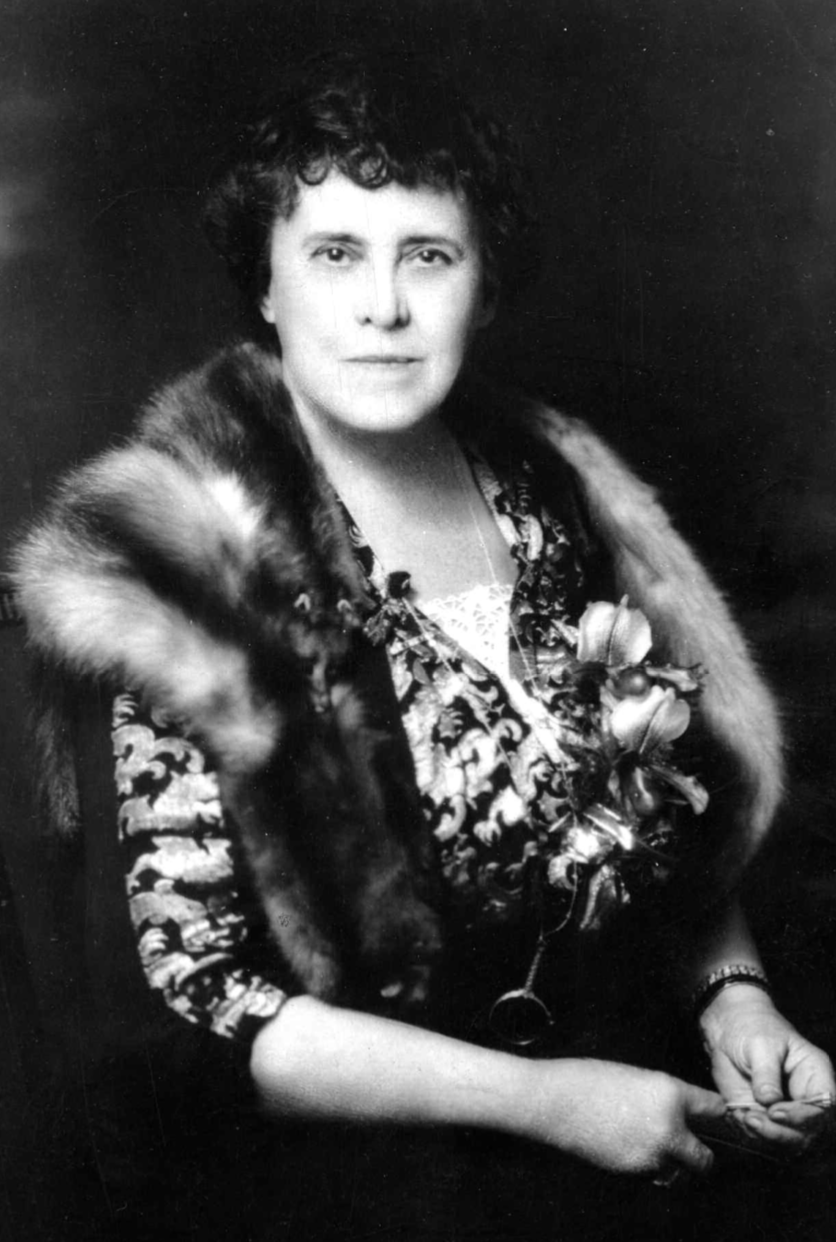
- Helena Hellwig Pouch in 1942
- Country (sports): United States
- Born: March 4, 1874; Brooklyn, NY, United States
- Died: November 26, 1960 (aged 86); Manhattan, New York

Singles

Grand Slam singles results
- US Open: W (1894)

Doubles

Grand Slam doubles results
- US Open: W (1894, 1895)

18th DAR President General, National Society Daughters of the American Revolution
- In office 1941–1944
- Preceded by: Sarah Corbin Robert
- Succeeded by: May Erwin Talmadge

Personal details
- Spouse: William H. Pouch
- Children: 1

Helena Rebecca Hellwig Pouch (March 4, 1874 – November 26, 1960) was an American tennis player and served as the 18th President General of the Daughters of the American Revolution.

== Personal life ==
Helena was born in New York City, the daughter of Morris and Helen Hellwig. She married William "Billy" H. Pouch on 8 November 1897 in Kings, New York. Pouch was the son of Alfred J Pouch and chairman of the Concrete Steel Company. Helena died in New York City at the age of 86.

Together, Helena and William had one daughter, Helen Pouch, who died in January 1919 at the age of 18.

== Tennis career ==
Hellwig won the 1894 U.S. National Championships singles title defeating reigning champion Aline Terry in five sets. Together with compatriot Juliette Atkinson she won the 1894 and 1895 doubles title. She lost her singles title to Juliette Atkinson who beat her in straight sets in the 1895 challenge round.

=== Grand Slam finals ===
==== Singles (1 title) ====
Result	Year	Championship	Surface	Opponent	Score
Win	1894	U.S. Championships	Grass	(United States) Aline Terry	7–5, 3–6, 6–0, 3–6, 6–3

==== Doubles (2 runner-ups) ====
Result	Year	Championship	Surface	Partner	Opponents	Score
Win	1894	U.S. Championships	Grass	(United States) Juliette Atkinson	(United States) Annabella Wistar (United States) Amy Williams	4–6, 6–8, 2–6
Win	1895	U.S. Championships	Grass	(United States) Juliette Atkinson	(United States) Elisabeth Moore (United States) Amy Williams	2–6, 2–6, 10–12

== Daughters of the American Revolution ==
Pouch was elected the 18th DAR President General in 1941, having previously joined the Richmond County Chapter in Staten Island, NY in 1916. She served as Chapter Regent (1926–1929), New York State Chairman of Better Films, National Vice Chairman of the Northern Division (1929–1931), Vice President General (1931–1934), and Organizing Secretary General (1935–1938). Additionally, she was elected Senior National President of the National Society of the Children of the American Revolution in 1937.

=== President General Administration ===
Elected DAR President General in 1941, Pouch's administration coincided with World War II, and all of her projects addressed the war effort. She encouraged members to comply with and support wartime rationing and to volunteer with the American Red Cross. Younger members were asked to consider enlisting in the Women's Army Auxiliary Corps or Women Accepted for Volunteer Emergency Service, and Pouch supported these branches by visiting their training camps.

The DAR's Headquarters in Washington, D.C., Memorial Continental Hall and DAR Constitution Hall, were offered as workspace to the American Red Cross, the WAAC, the WAVES, Pan American Sanitary Bureau, and other organizations. In order to show their "earnestness to assist [their] Government in united war effort," all three Continental Congresses during the Pouch Administration were relocated. Pouch stated that "when it became apparent that our presence in what is now the war capital of the world would further complicate the terrific congestion already existing there, it was decided that our cooperation in this crisis was necessary." In 1942 the 51st Continental Congress, nicknamed the "Victory Congress," was held at the Stevens Hotel in Chicago, Illinois, in 1943 the 52nd Continental Congress was relocated to Cincinnati, Ohio, and in 1944 the 53rd Continental Congress was held in New York City. The 1945 Continental Congress, held during the Talmadge administration, was canceled due to ongoing rationing and restrictions.

=== Helen Pouch Memorial Fund ===
Pouch was the first National Chair of Junior Membership Committee, which promotes the recruitment of DAR members under the age of 36. Through this chairmanship, Pouch became a favorite of Junior Members who referred to her as "Aunt Helen." In memory of Pouch's only child, Helen, who died in 1919 at the age of 18, Juniors in Chicago proposed the creation of the Helen Pouch Memorial Fund (HPMF). This fund primarily supports the DAR's mission of education through financial donations to approved DAR Schools. In its first year, efforts funded three $100 scholarships and in 2018 the Fund provided more than $200,000 to DAR Schools. Funds are raised through direct donations to the Friends of DAR Schools Fund, including the Sustaining Supporter program, DAR merchandise sales at the Junior Shoppes, and Classroom Grant Awards Program. The symbol of the HPMF is the Kangaroo.

== Other associations ==
- Girl Scout Council of Greater New York
- Staten Island Historical Society
- United States Tennis Association
