= Edwin P. Fischer =

American tennis player

Edwin Fischer
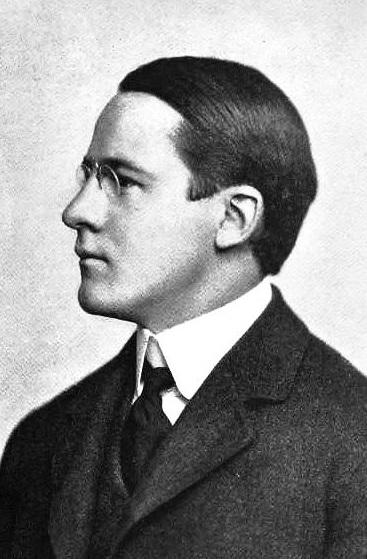
- Fischer in 1900
- Full name: Edwin Philip Fischer
- Country (sports): United States
- Born: October 3, 1872 New York City, U.S.
- Died: November 8, 1947 (aged 75) New York City, U.S.
- Turned pro: 1891 (amateur tour)
- Retired: 1911
- Plays: Right-handed (one-handed backhand)

Singles
- Career titles: 20
- Highest ranking: No. 5 (1896 U.S. ranking)

Grand Slam singles results
- US Open: SF (1896)

Grand Slam mixed doubles results
- US Open: W (1894, 1895, 1896, 1898)

Edwin Philip Fischer (October 3, 1872 – November 8, 1947) was an American male tennis player who was active in the late 19th century and notable for his association with the Wall Street bombing of 1920.

== Biography ==
Edwin Fischer won the mixed doubles title at the U.S. National Championships four times. In 1894, 1895 and 1896, he won the title with Juliette Atkinson, and in 1898, he won his fourth title partnering Carrie Neely. The mixed doubles championship was played at the Philadelphia Cricket Club.

His best result in the men's singles competition came in 1896 when he reached the semifinals in which he was beaten by Bill Larned. In 1897, he again was defeated by Larned, this time in the quarterfinals.

In July 1896, he won the Tuxedo Invitation tournament in Tuxedo Park, New York , defeating 1894 and 1895 champion Malcolm Chace. Fischer was a three-times finalist at the Canadian Championships in 1896, 1897 and 1906. He was a runner-up at the 1906 indoor national tennis championship in New York. His highest ranking in U.S. singles was no. 5 in 1896, and he was ranked in the top 10 during four years.

Fischer was a member of the Merriewold Tennis Club during the 1910s. He came out of retirement to compete in its tournament in 1913 and 1914.

== Wall Street bombing ==
At noon on September 16, 1920, a bomb exploded on Wall Street in the Financial District of New York City. The blast killed 38 and seriously injured 143.

Investigators of the Wall Street bombing became suspicious of Edwin Fischer, then a lawyer, as he apparently predicted the attack with astonishing accuracy. Fischer had been warning his friends of an impending bomb attack on Wall Street, sending them postcards urging them to leave the area before September 16.

He was taken into custody in Hamilton, Ontario. On return to New York, he was wearing two business suits for warmth and a tennis outfit underneath, which he claimed he wore "to be ready for a tennis match at all times". The police questioned him at Bellevue. He said he had received the messages "through the air from God." Realizing Fischer was suffering from a mental disorder and finding that he made a regular habit of issuing such warnings, the police released him and had him committed to the Amityville Asylum where he was diagnosed as 'insane but harmless'.

He had been a patient at the Goshen sanitarium for a few weeks in 1906, and the doctor that treated him at the time, Dr. F. W. Seward, Jr., remarked in 1920, "I do not regard him as possessed of psychic power, but believe the fact that he gave warning of the explosion which occurred was merely a coincidence."

== Grand Slam finals ==
=== Mixed doubles (4 titles) ===
Result	Year	Championship	Surface	Partner	Opponents	Score
Win	1894	U.S. Championships	Grass	(United States) Juliette Atkinson	(United States) Mrs. McFadden (United States) Gustav Remak, Jr.	6–3, 6–2, 6–1
Win	1895	U.S. Championships	Grass	(United States) Juliette Atkinson	(United States) Amy Williams (United States) Mantle Fielding	4–6, 8–6, 6–2
Win	1896	U.S. Championships	Grass	(United States) Juliette Atkinson	(United States) Amy Williams (United States) Mantle Fielding	6–2, 6–3, 6–3
Win	1898	U.S. Championships	Grass	(United States) Carrie Neely	(United States) Helen Chapman (United States) J.A. Hill	6–2, 6–4, 8–6
