= Amy Williams (tennis) =

American tennis player

- Full name: Amy Reeve Williams
- Country (sports): United States
- Born: 29 March 1872; Philadelphia, PA, United States
- Died: 1969

Doubles

Grand Slam doubles results
- US Open: F (1894, 1895)

Grand Slam mixed doubles results
- US Open: F (1895, 1896)

Amy Reeve Williams Fielding (1872-1969) was a female tennis player from the United States who played in the last decade of the 19th century and the first decade of the 20th century.

She was married to Mantle Fielding; they had two children, Richard M. and Frances. After Fielding's death in 1941, she married John Duncan Spaeth in 1942.

== Grand Slam finals ==
=== Doubles (2 runner-ups) ===
Result	Year	Championship	Surface	Partner	Opponents	Score
Loss	1894	U.S. Championships	Grass	(United States) Annabella Wistar	(United States) Helen Hellwig (United States) Juliette Atkinson	4–6, 6–8, 2–6
Loss	1895	U.S. Championships	Grass	(United States) Elisabeth Moore	(United States) Helen Hellwig (United States) Juliette Atkinson	2–6, 2–6, 10–12

=== Mixed doubles (2 runner-ups) ===
Result	Year	Championship	Surface	Partner	Opponents	Score
Loss	1895	U.S. Championships	Grass	(United States) Mantle Fielding	(United States) Juliette Atkinson (United States) Edwin P. Fischer	6–4, 6–8, 2–6
Loss	1896	U.S. Championships	Grass	(United States) Mantle Fielding	(United States) Juliette Atkinson (United States) Edwin P. Fischer	2–6, 3–6, 3–6
