= Kathleen Atkinson =

American tennis player

- Country (sports): United States
- Born: November 5, 1875; Maplewood, New Jersey, U.S.
- Died: April 30, 1957 (aged 81)

Singles

Grand Slam singles results
- US Open: SF (1895, 1897)

Doubles

Grand Slam doubles results
- US Open: W (1897, 1898)

Kathleen Gill Atkinson (November 5, 1875 – April 30, 1957) was an American tennis player.

With her older sister, Juliette, both residents of Maplewood, she won the US Women's National Championship in women's doubles 1897 and 1898. They were the first sisters to win a title together and the first to play each other in a semi final until the Williams sisters played in the final.

== Grand Slam finals ==
=== Doubles (2 titles) ===
Result	Year	Championship	Surface	Partner	Opponents	Score
Win	1897	U.S. National Championships	Grass	(United States) Juliette Atkinson	(United States) Mrs. F. Edwards (United States) Elizabeth Rastall	6–2, 6–1, 6–1
Win	1898	U.S. National Championships	Grass	(United States) Juliette Atkinson	(United States) Marie Wimer (United States) Carrie Neely	6–1, 2–6, 4–6, 6–1
