= Juliette Atkinson =

American tennis player (1873–1944)

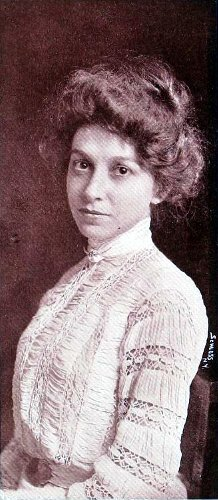
- Atkinson in 1900
- Full name: Juliette Paxton Atkinson
- Country (sports): (United States)
- Born: April 15, 1873 Rahway, New Jersey, United States
- Died: January 12, 1944 (aged 70) Lawrenceville, Illinois, United States
- Height: 5 ft 0 in (1.52 m)
- Plays: Right-handed
- Int. Tennis HoF: 1974 (member page)

Grand Slam singles results
- US Open: W (1895, 1897, 1898)

Grand Slam doubles results
- US Open: W (1894, 1895, 1896, 1897, 1898, 1901, 1902)

Grand Slam mixed doubles results
- US Open: W (1894, 1895, 1896)

Juliette Paxton Atkinson Buxton (née Atkinson; April 15, 1873 – January 12, 1944) was an American tennis player. She was born in Rahway, New Jersey, United States.

== Biography ==
Atkinson was the daughter of a Brooklyn, New York physician. She won three U.S. Women's singles, seven U.S. Women's doubles and three U.S. Mixed doubles titles.

Both natives of Maplewood, New Jersey, she and her sister Kathleen Atkinson partnered to win two women's doubles titles. Also the sisters twice faced each other in the semifinals of the singles competition. She won three mixed doubles titles with Edwin P. Fischer.

In 1896 and 1898, she won the Niagara International Tennis Tournament. She won the Canadian Championships three times in a row, 1896, 1897 and 1898.

In both 1899 and 1901, Atkinson won the doubles title and reached the singles final at the tournament now known as the Cincinnati Masters. She won the 1899 doubles title with Myrtle McAteer (falling to McAteer that year in the singles final) and the 1901 doubles title with Marion Jones Farquhar (falling in the singles final to Winona Closterman).

In 1918, she married George B. Buxton and had no children.

She was posthumously inducted into the International Tennis Hall of Fame in 1974.

== Grand Slam finals ==
=== Singles (3 titles, 1 runner-up) ===
Result	Year	Championship	Surface	Opponent	Score
Win	1895	U.S. Championships	Grass	(United States) Helen Hellwig	6–4, 6–2, 6–1
Loss	1896	U.S. Championships	Grass	(United States) Elisabeth Moore	4–6, 6–4, 2–6, 2–6
Win	1897	U.S. Championships	Grass	(United States) Elisabeth Moore	6–3, 6–3, 4–6, 3–6, 6–3
Win	1898	U.S. Championships	Grass	(United States) Marion Jones	6–3, 5–7, 6–4, 2–6, 7–5

=== Doubles (7 titles) ===
Result	Year	Championship	Surface	Partner	Opponents	Score
Win	1894	U.S. Championships	Grass	(United States) Helen Hellwig	(United States) Annabella C. Wistar (United States) Amy Williams	6–4, 8–6, 6–2
Win	1895	U.S. Championships	Grass	(United States) Helen Hellwig	(United States) Elisabeth Moore (United States) Amy Williams	6–2, 6–2, 12–10
Win	1896	U.S. Championships	Grass	(United States) Elisabeth Moore	(United States) Annabella C. Wistar (United States) Amy Williams	6–4, 7–5
Win	1897	U.S. Championships	Grass	(United States) Kathleen Atkinson	Mrs. F. Edwards (United States) Elizabeth Rastall	6–2, 6–1, 6–1
Win	1898	U.S. Championships	Grass	(United States) Kathleen Atkinson	(United States) Marie Wimer (United States) Carrie Neely	6–1, 2–6, 4–6, 6–1, 6–2
Win	1901	U.S. Championships	Grass	(United States) Myrtle McAteer	(United States) Marion Jones (United States) Elisabeth Moore	default
Win	1902	U.S. Championships	Grass	(United States) Marion Jones	(United States) Maud Banks (United States) Nona Closterman	6–2, 7–5

=== Mixed doubles (3 titles) ===
Result	Year	Championship	Surface	Partner	Opponents	Score
Win	1894	U.S. Championships	Grass	(United States) Edwin P. Fischer	(United States) Mrs. McFadden (United States) Gustav Remak Jr.	6–3, 6–2, 6–1
Win	1895	U.S. Championships	Grass	(United States) Edwin P. Fischer	(United States) Amy Williams (United States) Mantle Fielding	4–6, 8–6, 6–2
Win	1896	U.S. Championships	Grass	(United States) Edwin P. Fischer	(United States) Amy Williams (United States) Mantle Fielding	6–2, 6–3, 6–3
