= 1893 in tennis =

This page covers all the important events in tennis in 1893. It provides the results of notable tournaments throughout the year on both the men's and women's ILTF circuits.

== Australian Open ==
No event.

== French Open ==
Not a Grand Slam event.

== Wimbledon ==
Category	Champion(s)	Finalist(s)	Score
Men's singles	(United Kingdom) Joshua Pim	(United Kingdom) Wilfred Baddeley	3–6, 6–1, 6–3, 6–2
Women's singles	(United Kingdom) Lottie Dod	(United Kingdom) Blanche Hillyard	6–8, 6–1, 6–4
Men's doubles	(United Kingdom) Joshua Pim (United Kingdom) Frank Stoker	(United Kingdom) Harry Barlow (United Kingdom) Ernest Lewis	4–6, 6–3, 6–1, 2–6, 6–0

== US Open ==
Category	Champion(s)	Finalist(s)	Score
Men's singles	(United States) Robert Wrenn	(United States) Oliver Campbell	w/o
Women's singles	(United States) Aline Terry	(United States) Augusta Schultz	6–1, 6–3
Men's doubles	(United States) Clarence Hobart (United States) Fred Hovey	(United States) Oliver Campbell (United States) Bob Huntington	6–4, 6–4, 4–6, 6–2
Women's doubles	(United States) Aline Terry (United States) Harriet Butler	(United States) Augusta Schultz (United States) Ms Stone	6–4, 6–3
Mixed doubles	(United States) Ellen Roosevelt (United States) Clarence Hobart	(United States) Ethel Bankson (United States) Robert Willson Jr.	6–1, 4–6, 10–8, 6–1
