= 1893 in sports =

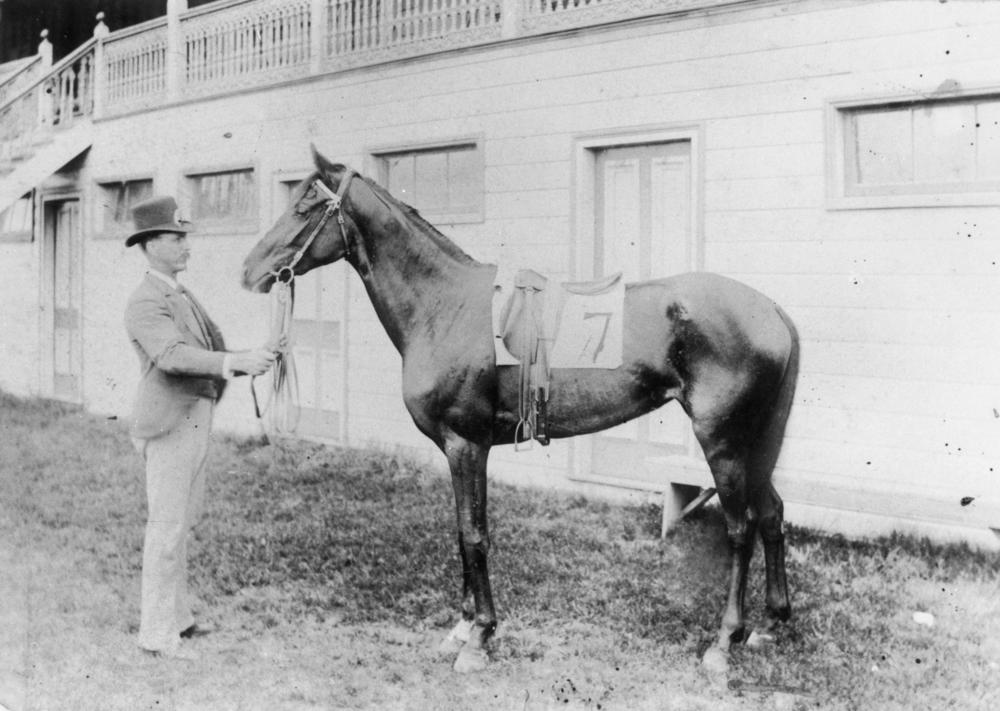
John Verrall with a racehorse at Eagle Farm, Brisbane

1893 in sports describes the year's events in world sport.

== Athletics ==
- USA Outdoor Track and Field Championships

== American football ==
College championship

- College football national championship – Princeton Tigers

Events

- 22 February – Alabama Crimson Tide and Auburn Tigers meet at Lakeview Baseball Park in Birmingham, Alabama for the first Iron Bowl.
- 2 December – Midshipman Joseph M. Reeves becomes the first documented player to wear a football helmet during the Army–Navy Game.

== Association football ==
Argentina

- 21 February – formation of the Argentine Football Association (Asociación del Fútbol Argentino or AFA)

Bohemia

- AC Sparta Prague, officially founded on 16 November.(later Czechoslovakia, present day Czech Republic)

England

- The Football League – Sunderland 48 points, Preston North End 37, Everton 36, Aston Villa 35, Bolton Wanderers 32, Burnley 30
- FA Cup final – Wolverhampton Wanderers 1–0 Everton at Fallowfield Stadium in Manchester
- Ahead of the 1893–94 season, the Football League decides to expand the Second Division from 12 to 16 clubs but, with the unexpected demise of Accrington, they are left with 15.
- Notts County and Accrington have been relegated from the First Division and replaced by Darwen and Sheffield United, both promoted from the Second Division. Bootle is expelled from the league and, to make the Second Division up to 16 clubs, the league elects Liverpool, Middlesbrough Ironopolis (league membership 1893–94), Newcastle United, Rotherham Town (1893–96) and Woolwich Arsenal, the latter being the first club from the south of England to join the Football League. Unexpectedly, Accrington then withdraws from the Football League and the 1893–94 Second Division has to proceed with an uneven 15 clubs.
- Although the Football League is experiencing membership difficulties at this time, it has nevertheless succeeded in electing three of its most illustrious members: Liverpool, Newcastle United and Arsenal.

Portugal

- 28 September – foundation of F.C. Porto as Football Club do Porto

Scotland

- Scottish Football League – Celtic
- Scottish Cup final – Queen's Park 2–1 Celtic at Ibrox Park (replay after first match abandoned)
- Formation of the SFL Second Division ahead of the 1893–94 season. Abercorn and Clyde are relegated to the Second Division and replaced in the First Division by Dundee and St. Bernard's. The new members of the Second Division are Cowlairs (re–elected to the SFL), Hibernian, Greenock Morton, Motherwell, Northern FC, Partick Thistle, Port Glasgow Athletic and Thistle FC.

== Australian Rules Football ==
- Victorian Football Association premiers - Essendon
- SANFL premiers - South Adelaide
- WAFL premiers - Fremantle

== Baseball ==
National championship

- Beginning in 1893, the National League's championship pennant is awarded to the first–place club in the standings at the end of the season. The Boston Beaneaters takes the 1893 title and there is no post–season play–off series.

Events

- The pitcher's rubber replaces the box and the effective distance from home plate increases from 55 feet to 60 feet, 6 inches.

== Basketball ==
Events

- 8 April – first college basketball game takes place in Beaver Falls, Pennsylvania where Geneva College defeats New Brighton YMCA

== Boxing ==
Events

- World Lightweight Champion Jack McAuliffe retires undefeated and is one of the few boxers to be unbeaten in an entire career. The title becomes vacant.

Lineal world champions

- World Heavyweight Championship – James J. Corbett
- World Middleweight Championship – Bob Fitzsimmons
- World Welterweight Championship – "Mysterious" Billy Smith
- World Lightweight Championship – Jack McAuliffe → title vacant after McAuliffe retires undefeated
- World Featherweight Championship – George Dixon

== Canadian Football ==
- Ontario Rugby Football Union - Queen's University
- Quebec Rugby Football Union - Montreal
- Manitoba Rugby Football Union - St John's
- Northwest Championship - Winnipeg

== Cricket ==
Events

- The inaugural Sheffield Shield competition in Australia is won by Victoria.
- The 1892–93 season in India marks the beginning of recognised first-class cricket there.
- An Australian team tours England and plays a Test series of three matches. Two are drawn and England win the other to reclaim The Ashes.

England

- County Championship – Yorkshire
- Most runs – Andrew Stoddart 2072 @ 42.28 (HS 195*)
- Most wickets – J T Hearne 212 @ 16.47 (BB 8–55)
- Wisden Five All–Round Cricketers – George Giffen, Alec Hearne, Stanley Jackson, Harry Trott, Ted Wainwright

Australia

- Sheffield Shield – Victoria
- Most runs – George Giffen 468 @ 58.50 (HS 181)
- Most wickets – George Giffen 33 @ 23.00 (BB 9–147)

India

- Bombay Presidency – Parsees

West Indies

- Inter-Colonial Tournament – Barbados

== Golf ==
Major tournaments

- British Open – William Auchterlonie

Other tournaments

- British Amateur – P.C. Anderson

== Horse racing ==
England

- Grand National – Cloister
- 1,000 Guineas Stakes – Siffleuse
- 2,000 Guineas Stakes – Isinglass
- The Derby – Isinglass
- The Oaks – Mrs Butterwick
- St. Leger Stakes – Isinglass

Australia

- Melbourne Cup – Tarcoola

Canada

- Queen's Plate – Martello

Ireland

- Irish Grand National – Thurles
- Irish Derby Stakes – Bowline

USA

- Kentucky Derby – Lookout
- Preakness Stakes – not run
- Belmont Stakes – Commanche

== Ice hockey ==
Events

- March – the Ottawa Hockey Club defeats the Toronto Granites by default to win the Ontario Hockey Association title.
- 17 March – At the conclusion of the 1893 AHAC season, Montreal Hockey Club wins the championship with a record of finishes in first place and is awarded the inaugural Stanley Cup. The club, which is in dispute with the Montreal AAA, refuses to accept it.

== Rowing ==
The Boat Race

- 22 March – Oxford wins the 50th Oxford and Cambridge Boat Race

== Rugby football ==
Home Nations Championship

- In the 11th series, six matches are played between England, Ireland, Scotland and Wales. Wales wins all three of its matches to take the Championship for the first time.

== Speed skating ==
Events

- First World Championships in speed skating (open to men only) directly under the auspices of the ISU held in Amsterdam

Speed Skating World Championships

- Men's All-round Champion – Jaap Eden (Netherlands)

== Tennis ==
England

- Wimbledon Men's Singles Championship – Joshua Pim (Ireland) defeats Wilfred Baddeley (GB) 3–6 6–1 6–3 6–2
- Wimbledon Women's Singles Championship – Lottie Dod (GB) defeats Blanche Bingley Hillyard (GB) 6–8 6–1 6–4

France

- French Men's Singles Championship – Laurent Riboulet (France) defeats Jean Schopfer (France) 6–3 6–3

USA

- American Men's Singles Championship – Robert Wrenn (USA) defeats Fred Hovey (USA) 6–4 3–6 6–4 6–4
- American Women's Singles Championship – Aline Terry (USA) defeats Augusta Schultz (USA) 6–1 6–3

== Yacht racing ==
America's Cup

- The New York Yacht Club retains the America's Cup as Vigilant defeats British challenger Valkyrie II, of the Royal Yacht Squadron, 3 races to 0
