= John Gazzam Butler =

United States Army general and inventor

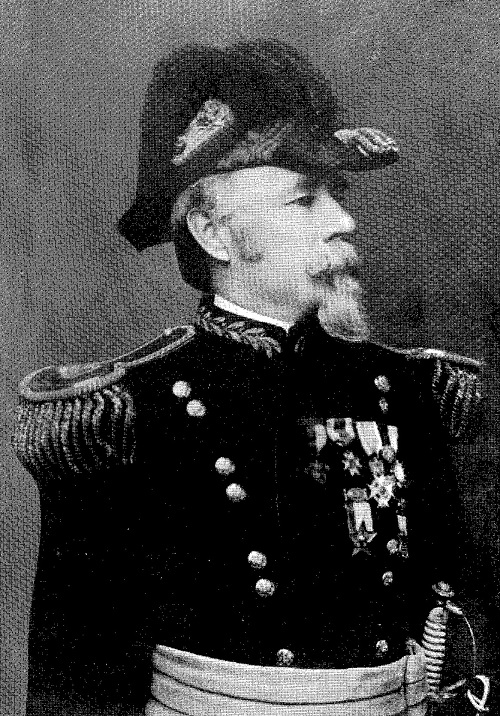
Brig. Gen. John G. Butler

Brig. Gen. John Gazzam Butler (January 23, 1842 – August 17, 1914) was an American army officer and inventor. He spent most of his career in the Ordnance Corps where he helped design and produce better ammunition for rifled guns.

== Early life ==
Butler was born in Pittsburgh, Pennsylvania, on January 23, 1842, to John Bartlett Butler (1793–1870) and Catherine (Gazzam) Butler (1799–1882). His father had been a newspaper editor, then president of the Pennsylvania Canal Commission. During the Mexican-American War, he served as a major under General Zachary Taylor. After the war, he served as a paymaster at the Allegheny Arsenal. Butler spent much of his childhood at the arsenal.

On his mother's side, Pittsburgh doctor and politician Edward D. Gazzam (1803–1878) was his uncle, and politician and businessman Joseph M. Gazzam (1842–1927) his cousin.

After attending public schools in Pittsburgh, Butler entered Western University of Pennsylvania but in 1859 left for West Point, graduating in 1863. He served with the 4th U.S. Artillery, Battery M, and saw action at the Battle of Chickamauga.

== Ordnance career ==
Butler was transferred to the Ordnance Corps on January 29, 1864, and was assigned to the Frankford Arsenal. In May 1864 Butler was detached for several months to help arm volunteers in New Jersey and then was sent to South Carolina to arm Sherman's army and accompanied it on the final few weeks of its march to the sea. He then served as assistant inspector and constructor of ordnance, based in New York City (December 1864 to June 1867). He continued to serve at various arsenals and depots, making captain (1874), major (1890), lieutenant colonel (1901), colonel (1903), and brigadier-general upon his retirement in 1904. He had served as president of the Ordnance Board (1899–1900) and as a member of the Board for Testing Rifled Cannon (1900–1903).

Butler developed improved projectiles for use with rifled artillery in the early 1870s. In 1875 he published a book on "Projectiles and Rifled Cannon". In 1876 he was sent to Europe to study methods of ordnance production there. The army continued to purchase shot and shells produced under Butler's patents until at least 1882. He also had other patents, such as one concerning improvements in manufacturing gun barrels (1876).

== Family ==
Butler married Eliza Miller "Lillie" Warnick (1843–1906) on January 25, 1866. They had six children, five of whom survived infancy. Their son Lawrence Parker Butler (1868–1926) died in Walter Reed Hospital as a lieutenant colonel in the army infantry. Rodman Butler (1872–1950) served in the cavalry and later in the Quartermaster Corps, retiring as a lieutenant colonel in 1927. Their daughter Harriet, a national tennis champion, married Jay Johnson Morrow, another West Point graduate who was in the United States Army Corps of Engineers and served as Governor of the Panama Canal Zone from 1921 to 1924.

Butler died suddenly while staying with his daughter Harriet in Portland, Oregon. He is buried in Arlington National Cemetery.
