= Edward D. Gazzam =

American politician

Member of the Pennsylvania State Senate from the 22nd district
- In office 1857

Personal details
- Born: May 7, 1803 Pittsburgh, Pennsylvania, U.S.
- Died: February 19, 1878 (aged 74) Philadelphia, Pennsylvania, U.S.
- Party: Republican, Free Soil
- Spouse: Elizabeth Antoinette Beelen (m. 1835; died 1871)
- Children: 3, including Joseph
- Education: Western University of Pennsylvania, University of Pennsylvania
- Occupation: Medical doctor, politician, lawyer

Edward Despard Gazzam (May 7, 1803 – February 19, 1878) was an American medical doctor, lawyer, politician, and abolitionist. He was a founder of the Free Soil Party and served in the Pennsylvania State Senate.

== Early life ==
Born in Pittsburgh, Gazzam was the son of William and Martha (Hunt) Gazzam; his English journalist father fled Burwell for America in 1800 to avoid arrest for his radicalism after the arrest of his friend Edward Despard. Gazzam attended the Western University of Pennsylvania, graduating in 1824, and then read law with Richard Biddle. He was admitted to the bar in 1826 and practiced for a time with his mentor, but ill health made him change his profession. He next studied medicine, graduating from the University of Pennsylvania medical school in Philadelphia in 1831. He established a practice in Pittsburgh.

== Political career ==
In 1839 Gazzam was nominated for state senate by the "Locofoco" Democrats, losing narrowly to Thomas Williams, the Anti-Masonic Party candidate. In 1841 he ran again on the Democratic ticket for state senate, losing by one vote to Whig George Darsie. In March 1844 he was nominated in a special election for United States Representative for Pennsylvania's 21st congressional district, losing to Whig Cornelius Darragh. In August 1848 he attended the organizing and nominating convention of the Free Soil Party in Buffalo, New York and also ran for governor of Pennsylvania on the Free Soil ticket. In 1855 he ran for the state senate from Allegheny County on the Free Soil line. By 1856 he had become involved with the fledgling Republican Party, addressing the organizing convention in Pittsburgh in February and serving as a delegate to the national convention in Philadelphia. Gazzam was elected to the state senate in 1856 on the Republican ticket.

== Family ==
Edward Gazzam's older sister Catherine (1799–1882) married John Bartlett Butler (1793–1870); their son John Gazzam Butler (1842–1914) had a long career developing new munitions and manufacturing techniques in the Ordance Corps.

Gazzam married Elizabeth Antoinette Beelen (1818–1871) in 1835. Beelen was the granddaughter of Baron Frederick Eugene de Beelen-Bertholf, the first Austrian minister to the United States; her father Constantin Anthony Beelen had become a wealthy Pittsburgh merchant and manufacturer. Edward and Elizabeth Gazzam had three children, Audley William, Emma Louise, and Joseph Murphy Gazzam. Audley Gazzam (1836–1884) was a bankruptcy lawyer who wrote several books on the subject and served as major of the Pennsylvania 103rd Volunteer Infantry in the Civil War. Joseph M. Gazzam (1842–1927), a doctor and businessman, also served in the Pennsylvania state senate, from 1877 to 1880.

Gazzam died on February 19, 1878, in Philadelphia and is buried in Allegheny Cemetery in Pittsburgh.
