= W. R. Granger =

Canadian sports administrator and businessman (1873–1925)

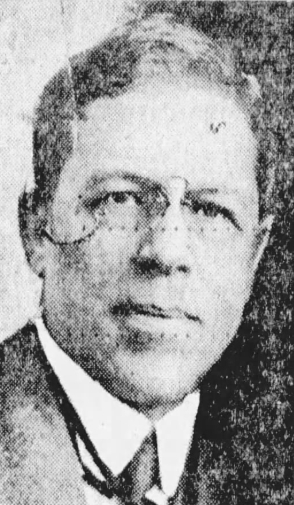
- Granger c. 1920
- Born: William Rowen Granger; December 13, 1873; Bethlehem, Pennsylvania, US
- Died: April 24, 1925 (aged 51); Westmount, Quebec, Canada
- Occupation: Businessman
- Known for: Montreal AAA; Quebec Amateur Hockey Association; Canadian Amateur Hockey Association; Canadian Wheelmen's Association
- Father: A. O. Granger

William Rowen Granger (December 13, 1873 – April 24, 1925) was an American-born Canadian sports administrator and businessman, who was president of multiple sports associations in Quebec, and led the Canadian Amateur Hockey Association (CAHA). He served as president of the Montreal AAA from 1918 to 1920, oversaw the revival of the association's ice hockey, baseball and soccer teams after World War I, and previously served as president of the Montreal Lawn Bowling Club and the Montreal Bicycle Club. He helped establish the Province of Quebec Lawn Bowling Association and became its president in 1919. He also served as president of the Inter-Club Road Race Association of Montreal, helped organize the Cyclists' Rights Committee in Montreal, and was a director of the Canadian Wheelmen's Association.

Granger was instrumental in founding the Quebec Amateur Hockey Association (QAHA) in 1919, and was its second president. He committed to amateurism in sport, to eliminate veiled professionalism, and standard registration cards with the Amateur Athletic Union of Canada. Granger and the QAHA were defendants in a court case that challenged the denial of an amateur registration card to a player who participated in semi-professional baseball prior to reaching the age of majority. The case necessitated QAHA constitutional changes, and that registration forms be printed in both English and French. He served as president of the CAHA for the 1921–22 season, established a national registry of players and a residency rule to restrict players from touring the country from team to team; began the practice of charging registration fees to provide income to branches of the CAHA, and collected a portion of gate receipts to assist weaker teams by revenue sharing.

In business, Granger worked in importing and manufacturing, as the son of American industrialist A. O. Granger. Granger was superintendent and secretary for the Auer Incandescent Light Manufacturing Company which his father co-founded, and was later president of Glassford Brothers Limited. He was a member of the Montreal Board of Trade, the Canadian Manufacturers' Association, and the Canadian Association of British Manufacturers. He also served as president of the Montreal Winter Sports Association which aimed to attract tourists, and resurrect the Montreal Winter Carnivals to benefit local businesses. The Gazette wrote that Granger was "one of Montreal's most popular businessmen", that he was respected for his opinions, and that his funeral was reported to be one of the largest ever known in Montreal.

== Early life and family ==
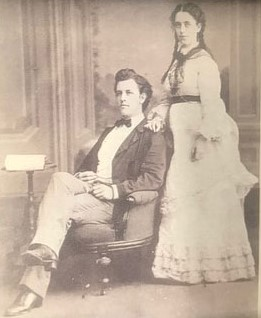
Granger's parents

William Rowen Granger was born in Bethlehem, Pennsylvania on December 13, 1873. His parents Arthur Otis Granger and Caroline Dickson Gregory originated from Philadelphia. A. O. Granger had Scottish heritage, and served as the private secretary to General William Tecumseh Sherman during the American Civil War, then became an industrialist in the United States and Canada.

Granger became a naturalized Canadian citizen after he moved to Montreal in autumn 1892. He had four brothers and a sister, including his brother Sherman, who also lived in Montreal. Granger was married to Ida V. W. Glassford, the daughter of Hugh Glassford, on September 18, 1900, at the American Presbyterian Church in Montreal. (Note: The American Presbyterian Church congregation in Montreal was organized by Scottish Americans and Scottish Canadians. In 1934, it merged with the Erskine Church founded by leaders of the Secession Church in Scotland, resulting in the Erskine and American United Church. The church building was listed on the Canadian Register of Historic Places in 1998, and purchased by the Montreal Museum of Fine Arts in 2010.) After a honeymoon in the Southern United States, they resided in Westmount, and had two daughters.

== Montreal AAA ==
Granger became involved with the Montreal AAA (Amateur Athletic Association) c. 1895, playing tennis and bicycling. He was also involved in arranging the annual Caledonian Games in Montreal, to celebrate Scottish heritage.

=== Bicycling ===
Granger was chairman of the Montreal Bicycle Club racing board from 1896 to 1899, (Note: Elected to one-year terms as chairman of the Montreal Bicycle Club racing board in 1896, 1897, and 1898.) which promoted local cyclists in competitions and sought improved track facilities. He was elected to the bicycle club executive and Montreal AAA board of directors in 1897, later became first vice-president, then elected president in 1899, and named to the Montreal AAA grounds committee. During this time, he was an umpire and starter for the club's road races, and led club efforts to establish a junior men's racing team.

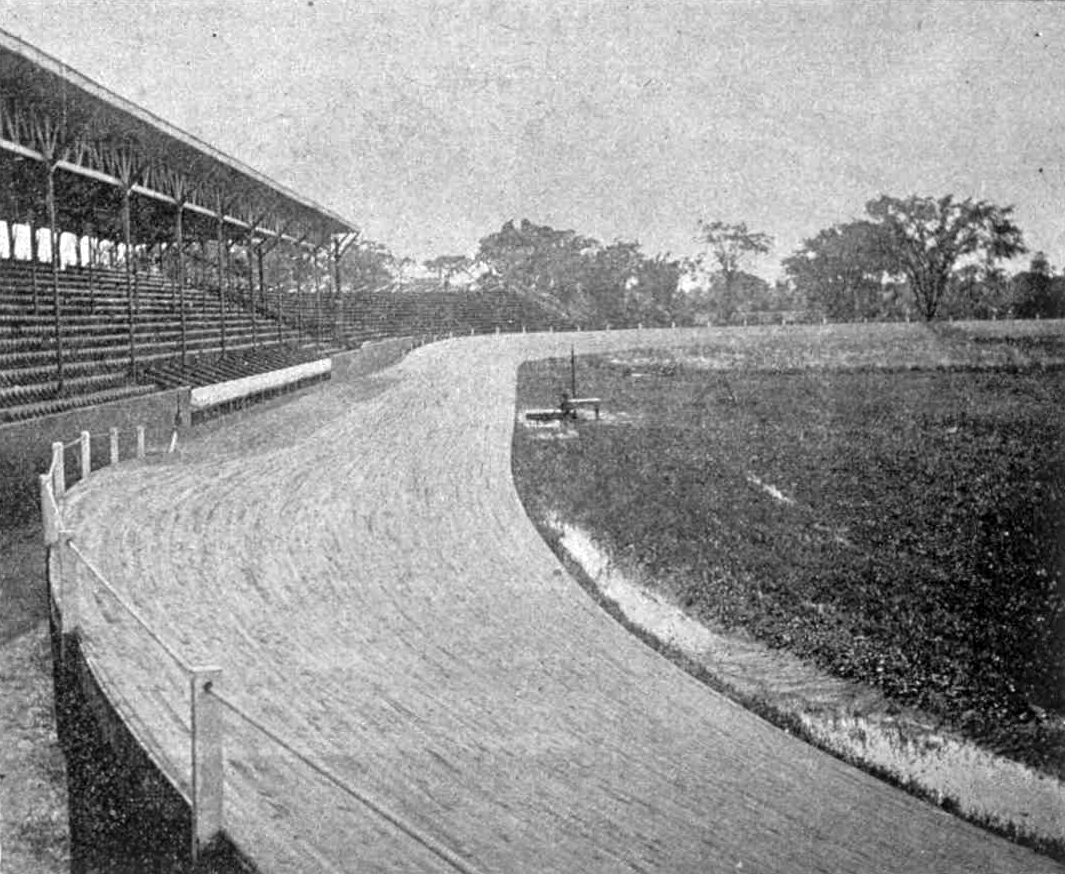
Queen's Park bicycle track c. 1899

Elected president of the Inter-Club Road Race Association of Montreal in August 1897, Granger presided over the road race board for Districts 10 and 11 of the Canadian Wheelmen's Association (CWA). He sought to maintain the ideals of amateur competitions, and cautioned that cyclists could be suspended from amateur status by racing against professionals or in events not sanctioned by the CWA. He assisted organizing the Cyclists' Rights Association in 1898, to educate the public on their objectives and liaise with Montreal City Council. Later in 1898, the city's bicycle clubs agreed to support the Queen's Park bicycle track to be constructed by the season's races. Bicycle club memberships subsequently grew with construction of the track and a clubhouse at Queen's Park.

Granger represented the Montreal Bicycle Club at the 1899 CWA general meeting, and was named to the CWA racing board to oversee the provincial meet at Terrebonne, Quebec. Montreal subsequently hosted the 1899 World's Meet at Queen's Park. He was reappointed to the racing board in 1900, after the CWA declared the International Cycling Association meet in Montreal to be a success, calling it the "greatest race meet ever held in America".

=== Lawn bowling ===
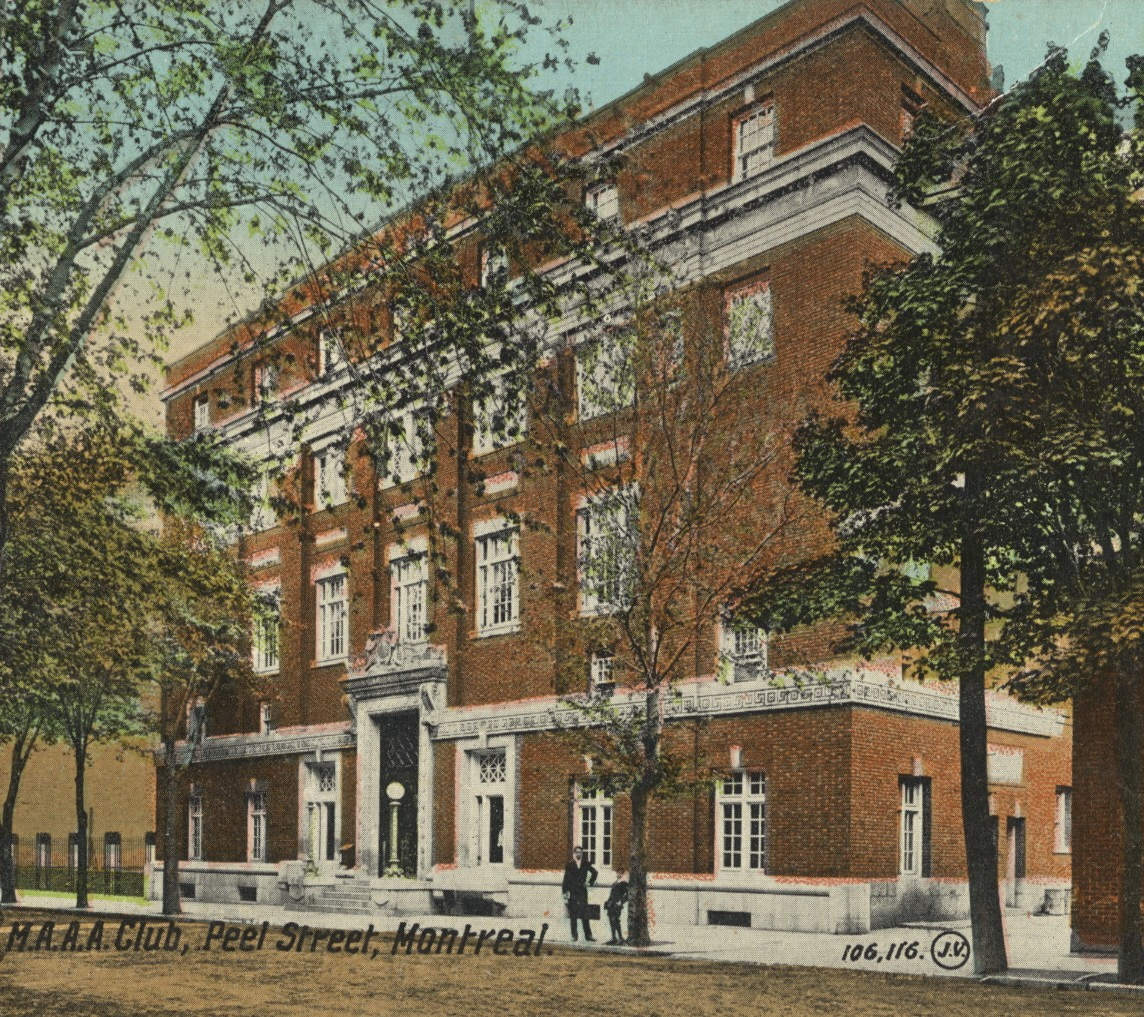
Montreal AAA clubhouse c. 1913

Granger was elected to the Montreal AAA Lawn Bowling Club committee in November 1909, and was the skip of his own rink throughout the 1910s and 1920s. He hired a full-time groundskeeper for the club's bowling green when he became vice-president of the club in 1911, and was elected secretary-treasurer of the Montreal Lawn Bowlers' League established in the same year. He served as president of the club from October 1911 to November 1913, and partnered with D. J. H. Murdoch to donate the Murdoch and Granger Cup awarded for the club's season champions in doubles competition. After his presidency, Granger remained involved on the executive and oversaw the greens committee.

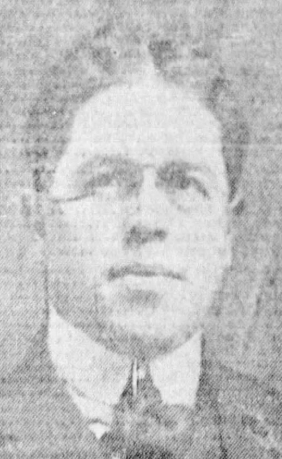
Granger c. 1917

Granger and the club hosted the meeting in April 1914, when the Montreal and District Lawn Bowling League was renamed to the Province of Quebec Lawn Bowling Association (PQLBA), drafted a new constitution, became the eastern section of the Dominion Lawn Bowling Association, and standardized its rules of play to be similar to those used in Ontario. Granger served as the secretary-treasurer of the PQLBA from 1914 to 1918, helped establish an annual singles competition as of the 1915 season, and proposed for an annual tournament with the Eastern Ontario Lawn Bowling Association to alternate between Montreal and Ottawa. He was elected vice-president of the PQLBA in December 1918, then became its president in October 1919. Under his leadership, the PQLBA began hosting an open-competition tournament in 1920, with divisions for singles and doubles welcomed from all lawn bowling clubs in Canada. He was subsequently made a permanent representative on the PQLBA committee, and helped organize competitions.

=== Executive member ===
Granger was elected a director of the Montreal AAA in 1914, then elected to the Montreal AAA executive in May 1915 as chairman of the clubhouse committee. Later in the same year, he was delegated to represent the association's interests at the meetings for the Quebec branch of the Amateur Athletic Union of Canada (AAU of C). The Montreal AAA loaned its facilities to the Canadian Army for training during World War I, and Granger co-ordinated fundraising efforts for the Canadian Red Cross.

The Montreal AAA elected Granger as vice-president and named him to the finance and property committees for 1916 and 1917. He served two years as president from 1918 to 1920, and hosted The Prince of Wales at the clubhouse on a royal visit in November 1919. By the end of World War I, Granger had overseen the revival of the association's ice hockey, baseball and soccer teams; and hoped to restart the lacrosse team, establish a trapshooting club, and erect a memorial for members who died serving in the war. In 1920, Granger helped arrange the Canadian Olympic team trials hosted by the Montreal AAA, and the establishment of a monthly magazine, The Winged Wheel. He was made a life member of the Montreal AAA after his two years as president, and remained on the nominations committee for MAAA executive elections.

== Ice hockey administrator ==
=== 1918–19 season ===
Granger oversaw the assembly of a hockey team by the Montreal AAA for the 1918–19 season, the resumption of playing in the Montreal City Amateur Hockey League after a three-year hiatus, and was committed to affiliating with the AAU of C. The Montreal City Amateur Hockey League declined offers to amalgamate with another league or become professional, drew up a schedule to play at the Victoria Skating Rink, and passed a resolution that all of its teams must be amateurs and affiliate with the AAU of C.

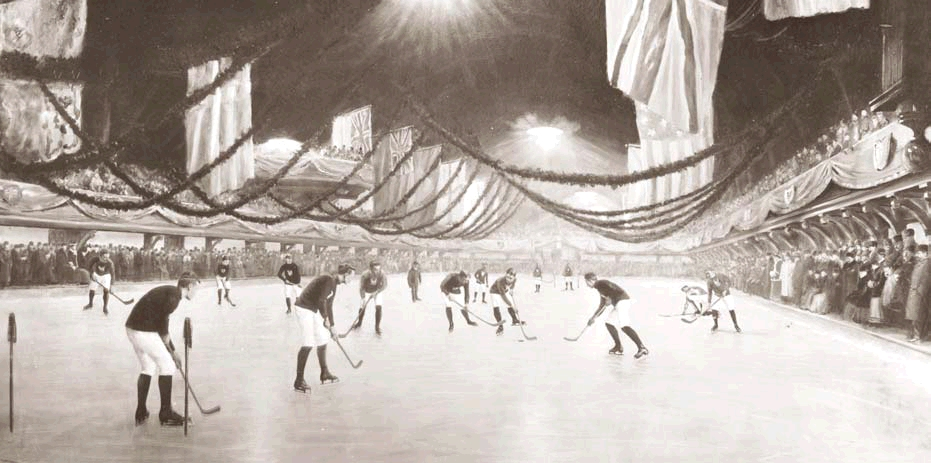
Ice hockey at Victoria Rink

The Quebec Amateur Hockey Association (QAHA) was founded in Montreal on January 19, 1919, with Hartland MacDougall elected as president and Granger as the vice-president. The new group was formed to govern amateur hockey in Montreal and the Province Quebec, and affiliated with the Canadian Amateur Hockey Association (CAHA). Registration cards became required to certify a player's amateur status as governed by the AAU of C, and prevented the mingling of amateurs and professionals in hockey. The Interscholastic Hockey League joined the Montreal City Amateur Hockey League under the jurisdiction of the QAHA and became eligible for the Allan Cup playoffs as the senior ice hockey champions of Canada, and the Junior Amateur Hockey Association also joined the QAHA and became eligible for the Memorial Cup playoffs as the junior ice hockey champions of Canada.

The Gazette credited Granger for being instrumental in founding the QAHA, fighting to maintain amateurism and for allowing hockey to thrive in Quebec. The establishment of the QAHA protected its leagues from the loss of players to the Eastern Canada Hockey Association, from which the Montreal City Amateur Hockey League had resigned during World War I in a dispute that the association operated under veiled professionalism. Granger warned that anyone playing against professionals would jeopardize their amateur status, and that the Eastern Canada Amateur Hockey Association had never affiliated with the QAHA or the CAHA.

=== 1919–20 season ===
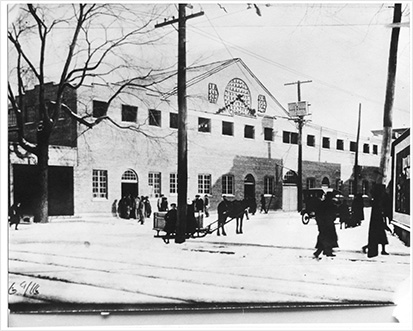
Mount Royal Arena

Granger was elected vice-president of the CAHA for the 1919–20 season. The CAHA adopted uniform ice hockey rules of play for the Allan Cup competition, excluded teams sponsored by commercial organizations from the national playoffs for senior hockey, and sought an alliance with the United States Amateur Hockey Association (USAHA) to allow international amateur games. The CAHA assumed control of the Memorial Cup playoffs and implemented the age limit in junior hockey as used by Ontario Hockey Association.

The Montreal City Amateur Hockey League admitted three new clubs and scheduled its games and practices at the newly constructed Mount Royal Arena. With the growth of amateur hockey, Granger recommended accommodating new teams by establishing an intermediate division at a level between senior and junior hockey.

Granger was elected president of the QAHA on December 8, 1919, and continued his campaign to clean up amateur hockey and expand the influence of the CAHA when he welcomed the Ottawa Amateur Federation into an affiliation with the QAHA. The affiliation settled the differences between multiple leagues in Ottawa now unified under the same jurisdiction. The QAHA implemented standard rules to rid its leagues of unsporting physical play, and grew with the additions of the Montreal City Amateur Intermediate League and the Bankers League of Montreal. With the intent to stabilize rosters for the playoffs, Granger enforced a deadline of January 31 where teams could mutually agree to allow players to transfer from one team to another.

=== 1920–21 season ===
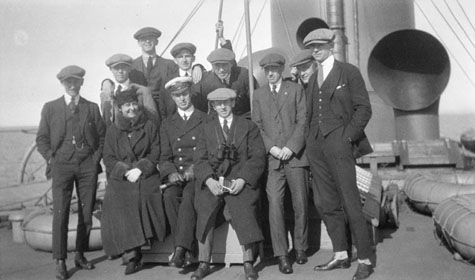
Winnipeg Falcons en route to the 1920 Olympics

The CAHA elected a new executive committee, and Thunder Bay Amateur Hockey Association president H. J. Sterling took charge for the 1920–21 season. In May 1920, Granger helped arrange a welcome home reception in Montreal for the Winnipeg Falcons who won the gold medal representing Canada in ice hockey at the 1920 Summer Olympics. In August 1920, he meet with representatives from the Ottawa City Hockey League, the Upper Ottawa Valley League, and Brockville, who proposed to separate from the QAHA. The resulting Ottawa and District Amateur Hockey Association was granted CAHA branch status in December 1920.

Granger was re-elected president of the QAHA in December 1920, and named chairman of the registration committee. Despite the loss of the Ottawa teams, the QAHA grew by accepting three new leagues based in Montreal, the Montreal Independent Intermediate Hockey League, the Pulp and Paper Company League, and the Montreal Industrial League; and expected applications from the Quebec City Intermediate League and the Quebec City Junior League, in addition to the existing Quebec City Senior League.

==== Dufresne v. Quebec Amateur Hockey Association ====
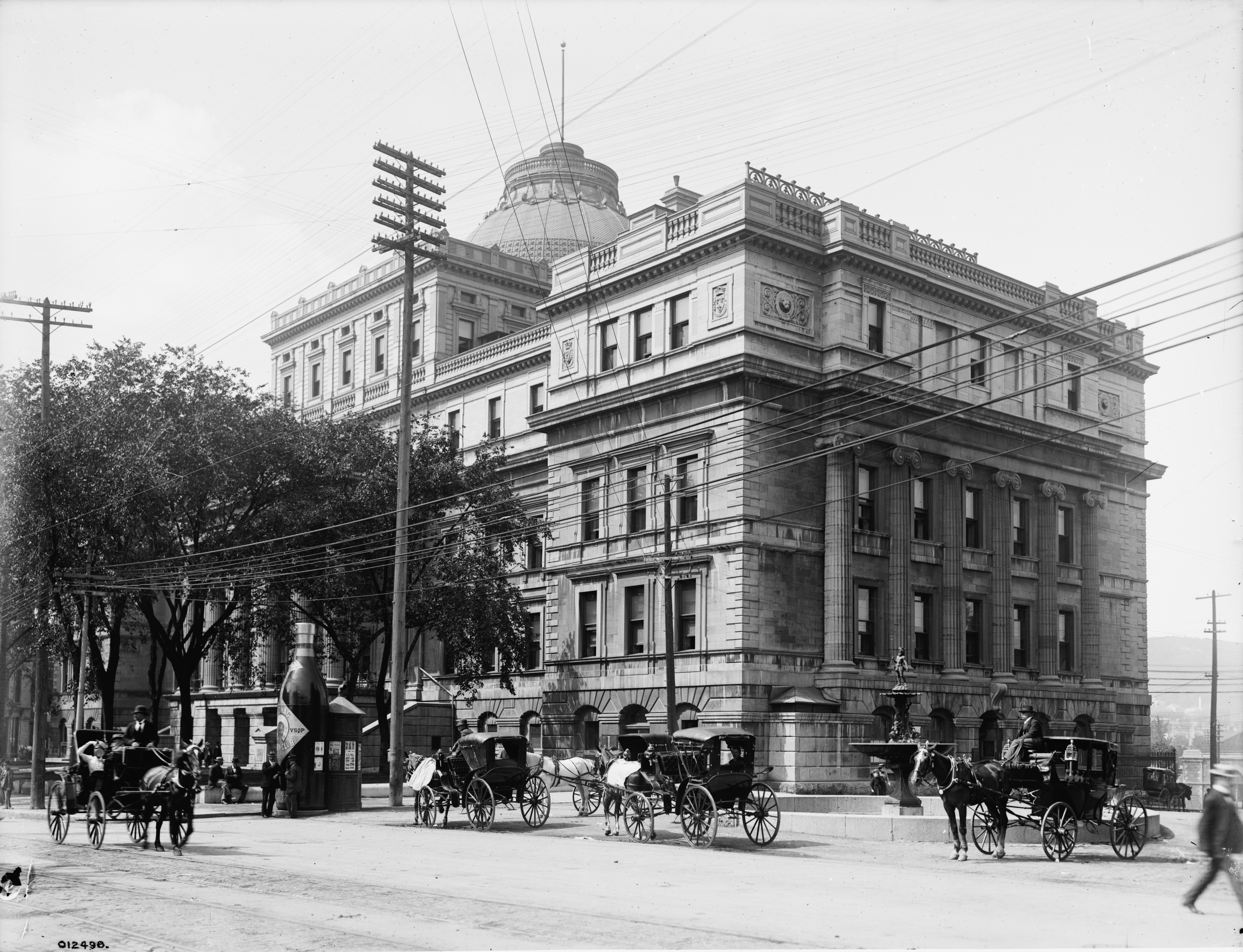
Old Montreal Courthouse

In March 1921, the QAHA registration committee listened to an appeal by George Dufresne for an amateur card which he had been refused. Dufresne admitted that he had played semi-professional baseball, had not applied for reinstatement as an amateur after a previous suspension, and argued that he should be reinstated as an amateur since he had not reached the age of majority when the incident occurred. Granger and the committee declined the appeal and stated that the decision was final as per the constitution of the CAHA.

Dufresne filed legal action seeking a writ of mandamus to be issued an amateur card. Respondents to the case included the highest officials in amateur sport in Quebec, and The Gazette speculated that the outcome may affect the status of amateur sport across Canada. Justice Louis Coderre presided over the case, and felt it was unreasonable that a boy who wanted to play a game would forfeit amateur status forever in any sport, not just ice hockey.

Counsel for Dufresne felt that the QAHA had discriminated by predetermining the outcome against Dufresne, and that Granger had a conflict of interest by being chairman of the registration committee and presenting evidence against Dufresne. Counsel accused that the committee of knowingly approved amateur cards to professional players, and argued that bank clerks in Montreal who were good hockey players earned C$75 per week, compared to other clerks who earned $30 per week and did not play hockey. Granger testified that the committee had never knowingly allowed any professional to play, and opined that a minor who was able to play with or against professionals was also mature enough to be aware of the consequences.

Dufresne testified that he was young and inexperienced at the time, did not know that he was playing with professionals, and that the compensation given to him had not covered his travel expenses to the games. He admitted that the committee's decision had been correct to refuse him an amateur card and withdrew the court case. He agreed to abide by amateur regulations henceforth and requested a new hearing. Granger and the QAHA registration committee agreed to give Dufresne a fresh start and issued him an amateur card.

=== 1921–22 season ===
The Allan Cup was the championship trophy for amateur senior ice hockey overseen by the CAHA.

The CAHA unanimously elected Granger its president on March 19, 1921. He sought to rid Canadian amateur hockey of veiled professionalism, and was appointed by the AAU of C to an independent commission to investigate the amateur status of all players across the country. He remained president of the QAHA, and called a special meeting in April 1921 to discuss incorporation into the CAHA and revisions to the QAHA constitution necessitated by the Dufresne court action. Granger welcomed recommendations from members of the association and sought to have the constitution and registration forms printed in both English and French. Commercial leagues in Montreal gave Granger a vote of confidence and agreed that professionals in another sport should be excluded from amateur hockey.

Granger toured Canada to speak with hockey executives during the summer in 1921, which led to suggestions to improve amateur hockey at the local and national levels. He recommended that branches of the CAHA update their by-laws to give executives the necessary to powers to enforce regulations, investigate amateur status, to charge service fees for registration and transfers, and have access to financial statements from teams and rinks to collect a portion of gate receipts and assist weaker teams by revenue sharing. He felt that teams should be controlled by a public athletic organization instead of an individual, and that a CAHA branch should associate itself with men who would uphold the principles of amateurism. He wanted all registration forms to include the complete AAU of C definition of an amateur, to restrict players to only being on teams where they resided, and to establish a national registry of players.

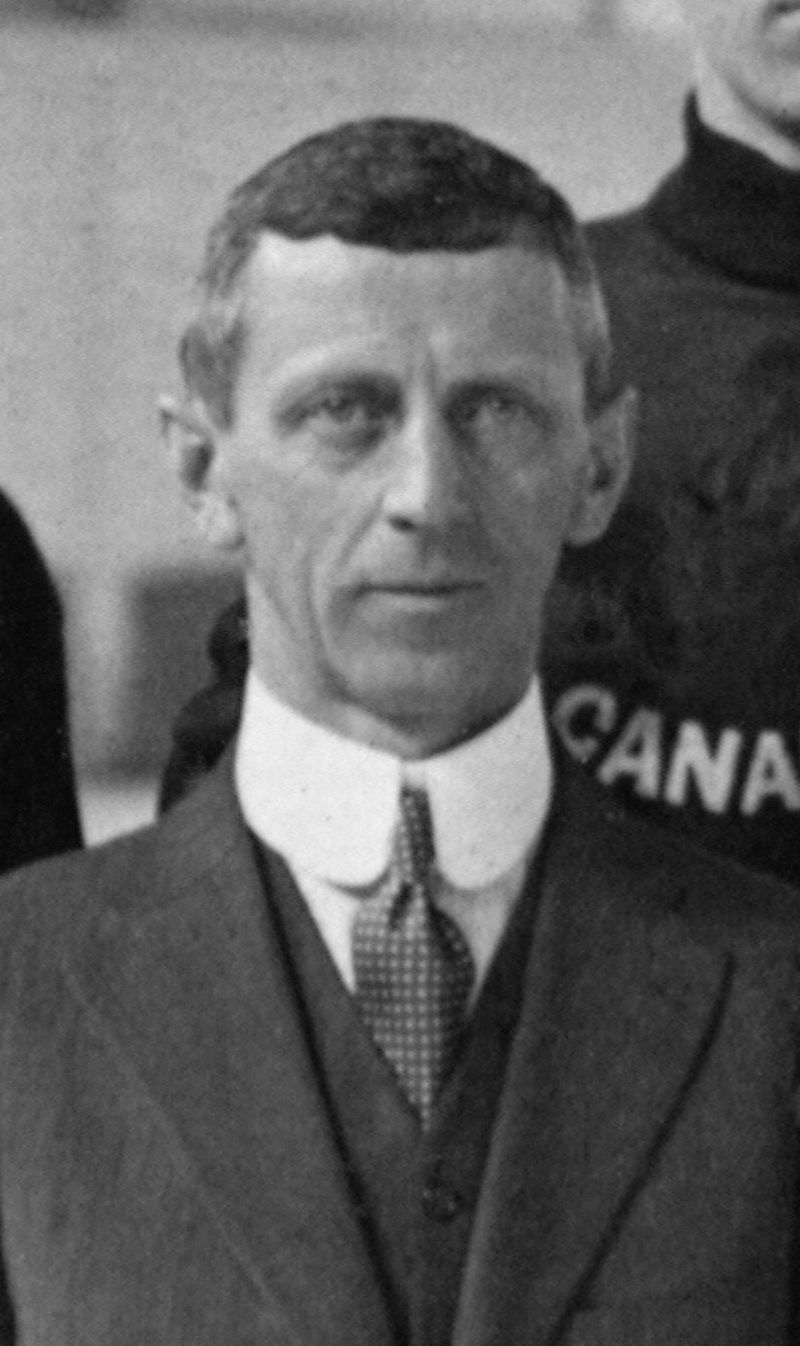
W. A. Hewitt

In October 1921, Granger called a meeting of CAHA branch presidents at the King Edward Hotel in Toronto, to discuss his recommendations and the findings of the independent commission. He paid travel expenses for CAHA branch presidents, to ensure their attendance in preparation for the upcoming hockey season, and to deal with professionalism in the amateur game. The CAHA meeting empowered the president to conduct votes by mail or telegraph as necessary, permitted access to teams' financial statements, and established a national registration committee with W. A. Hewitt as the registrar. The new committee included the president, registrar, and two members each from Eastern and Western Canada; and aimed to investigate all registrations to exclude professionals and reduce the number of players touring Canada from one team to another. As of the 1922–23 season, the CAHA enforced a deadline of August 1 to establish residency where a player wanted to join a local team. Granger also wanted to eliminate Canadian players touring to American-based teams for a season, and stated that the registration committee would deny transfer requests for a USAHA registration.

At the QAHA general meeting in December 1921, Granger recommended revisions to the constitution to improve finances and ensure amateur player registrations, and retired as president because he held the same position with the CAHA. He was subsequently an honorary vice-president of the Montreal City Hockey League. The QAHA approved his recommendations to automatically suspend any player who filed legal action, to compel players to accept rulings of the registration committee unless an appeal was heard by the CAHA, and to charge registration fees to senior players and annual dues to leagues to help fund the QAHA.

Granger oversaw the 1922 Allan Cup final series between the Toronto Granites and the Regina Victorias hosted in Toronto. Despite that it had been a recurring practice for each team to choose one of the two on-ice officials for the series, Granger scheduled two referees from Montreal when the Granites protested the referee chosen from Western Canada. Discussion ensued at the CAHA annual meeting being hosted in Toronto at the same time as the series, and a vote of the branch presidents confirmed that the practice of one referee each from Eastern and Western Canada should be used. The CAHA also decided that Eastern and Western Canada should take turns hosting the final series for the Allan Cup and the Memorial Cup, the location of the annual meeting, and who named the president for the season. The CAHA also approved that the reigning Allan Cup champions could challenge for the Hamilton B. Wills Trophy as an international series with the amateur champions of the USAHA.

=== 1922 to 1924 ===
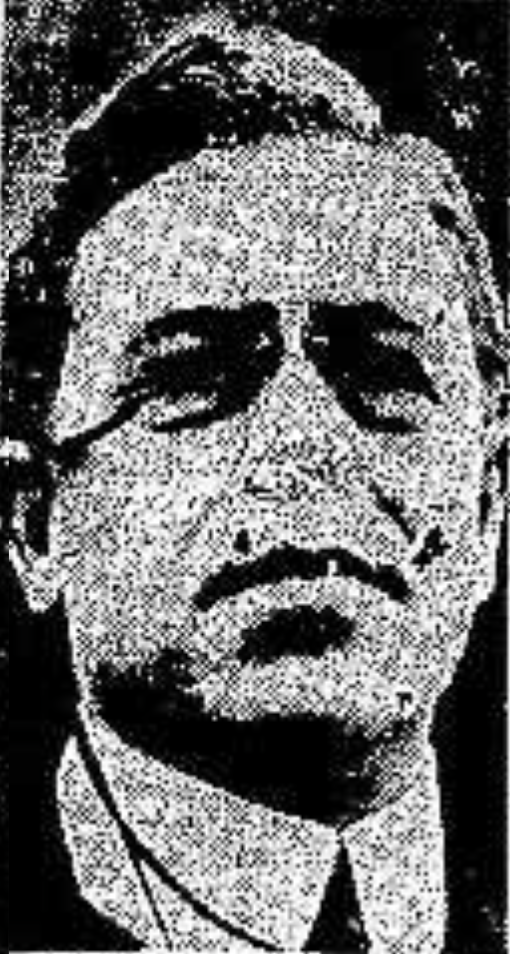
Granger c. 1922

In March 1922, Granger presided over the first CAHA annual meeting in which all members were represented in person, and dealt with overhauling the constitution. At the same meeting, Toby Sexsmith from the Manitoba Amateur Hockey Association was elected president to succeed Granger. Remaining on the executive for two years as the honorary president, Granger was named to the affiliation and alliances committee of the AAU of C. The CAHA recognized Granger's contributions to national hockey when it established the practice of awarding gold medals to its past presidents in March 1924.

In April 1924, the QAHA proposed to change its structure to be more similar to the Ontario Hockey Association, where clubs affiliated directly with the association instead of as a members of a league. The QAHA felt that the calibre of play was reduced when leagues competed against each other for players, and that clubs would better develop talent by eliminating the struggle to find players. Granger sat on the committee to draft revisions to the constitution which protected existing clubs from the competition for players by giving clubs the right to decide whether there was enough talent for new clubs to be established in any given area. His suggested changes to the QAHA constitution were adopted in November that year.

== Business career ==
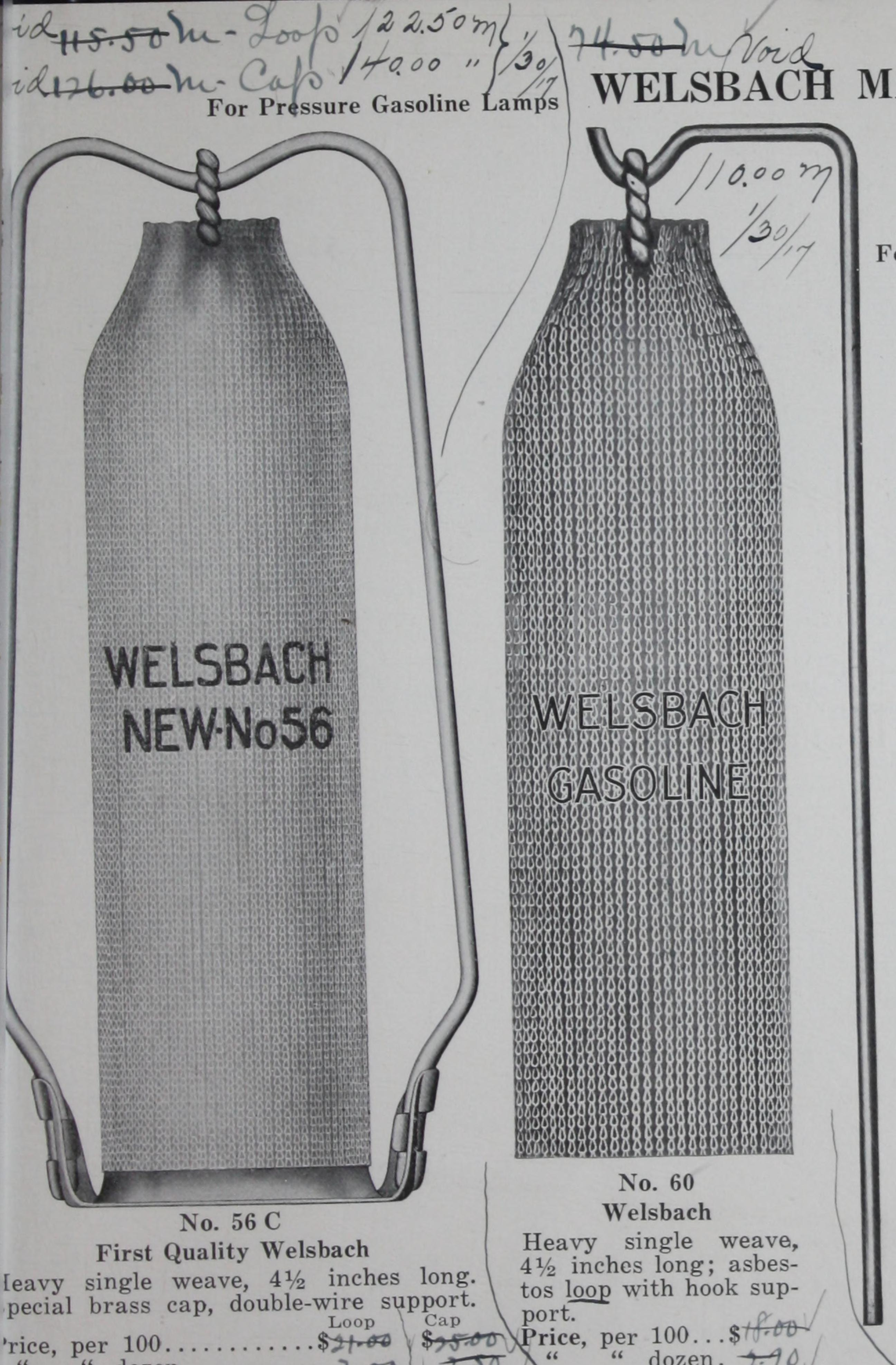
Advertisement for gas mantles from Carl Auer von Welsbach, c. 1910

Granger's father co-founded the Auer Incandescent Light Manufacturing Company of Montreal in October 1892. The company produced an incandescent fixture advertised as a cost and fuel efficient means of lighting. As of 1897, the company employed 40 people, had $500,000 in capital stock, with a manufacturing facility and offices on Notre-Dame Street West. Granger was superintendent and secretary of the company, which also oversaw Eastern Canada and sub-companies in Saint John, New Brunswick, and Halifax, Nova Scotia. Granger's position was general manager and secretary as of the general meeting in 1900, when his father was elected president. Granger remained secretary until c. 1906. His brother Sherman was also part of the company, and their father remained president until his death in 1914.

Granger joined Glassford Brothers Limited c. 1905, an importing and manufacturing company founded and presided over by his father-in-law, Hugh Glassford. Granger became president of Glassford Brothers Limited after the death of his father-in-law in March 1924, for the remainder of his life.

As a member of the Canadian Manufacturers' Association in 1920, Granger voiced opposition to the existing luxury tax and recommended that the Government of Quebec replace it with a sales tax. He also wanted to see legislation which marked the country of origin of imported goods, and determined which goods qualified for preferential tariffs as a British import. He was elected to the executive of the Montreal branch of the Canadian Manufacturers' Association in 1921, and appointed to its municipal affairs committee to liaise with city councils in the Greater Montreal area.

Granger was elected to the Montreal branch council of the Canadian Association of British Manufacturers in 1923 and 1924. The association promoted unity within the British Empire, and sought reduced maritime transport costs to compete with American factories. Granger felt it best to advocate for protectionism, instead of seeking lower tariffs on imported British goods. Granger was a member of the Montreal Board of Trade, and sat on the Montreal branch of the Canadian Manufacturers' Association which favoured daylight saving time across Quebec.

== Community involvement ==
Granger was a member of the Brome Lake Boating Club in Knowlton, Quebec, and was a course clerk for its annual regatta in 1906. He was president of the Brome Lake Boating Club in 1912. He was a member of the Knox Crescent Presbyterian Church, the Canadian Club of Montreal, and the Rotary Club of Montreal. He was chairman of the Rotary Club athletic committee in 1919.

Officers of several sporting organizations formed the Montreal Winter Sports Association in March 1922, and Granger was named to its committee which aimed to attract tourists to Montreal and benefit local businesses. The association sought a resurrection of the Montreal Winter Carnivals by the co-ordination of sports programs and advertising. Granger suggested hosting international hockey matches as part of the event. He was named chairman of the ice hockey committee for the association, promoting professional and amateur ice hockey during the carnival. When a beauty pageant became part of the Winter Carnival in 1923, Granger was one the judges to choose Montreal's contestant to compete for the Miss Canada title. He was elected president of the association in June 1924, overseeing a campaign during the summer to promote winter sports to American tourists.

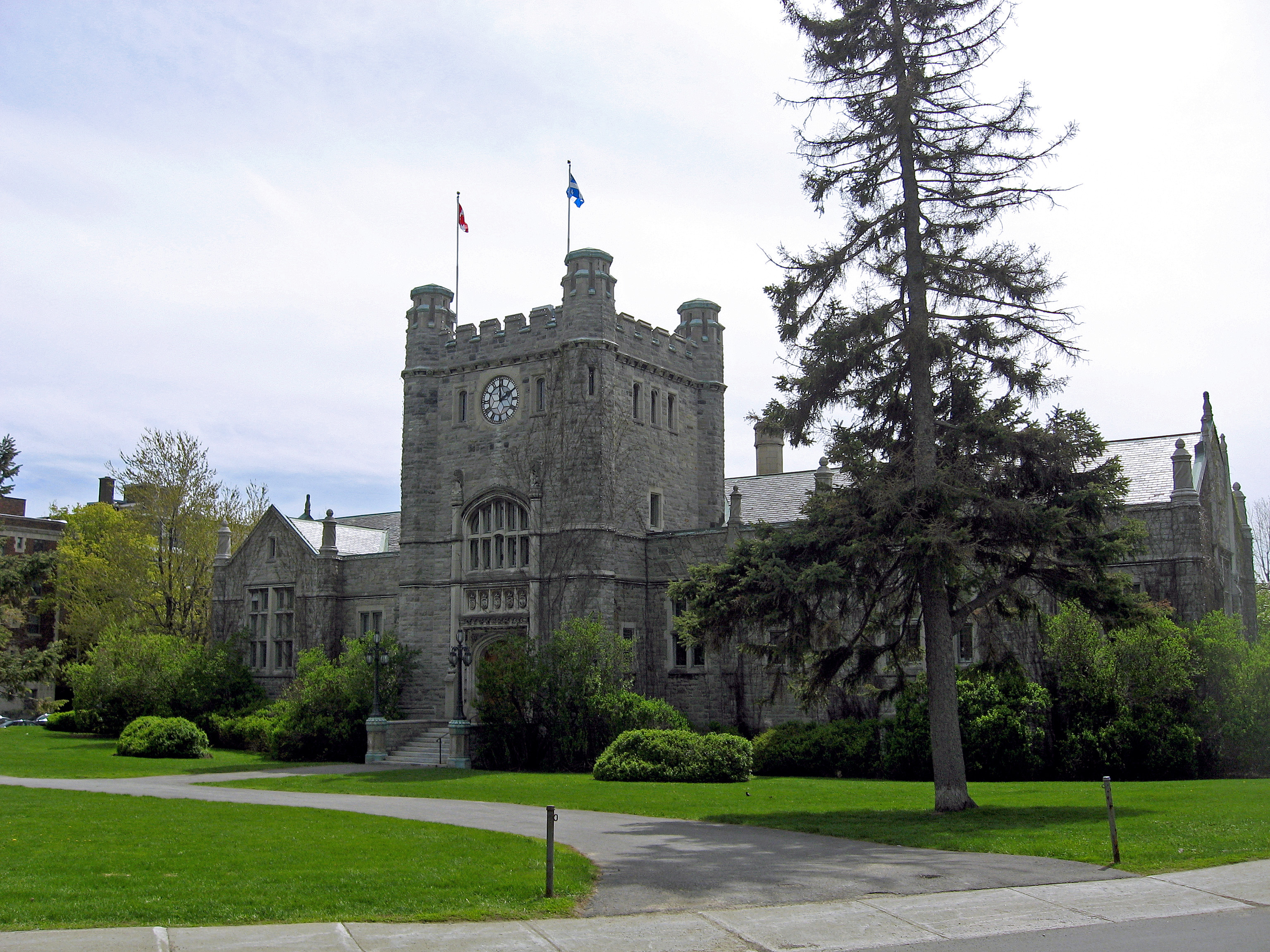
Westmount City Hall

Granger was elected president of the Westmount Municipal Association in February 1924, represented the community's concerns at Westmount City Hall meetings, and was opposed to the annexation of Westmount by Montreal. The association also sought to avoid service cuts to streetcars in Montreal, and to build an armory for the 1st Westmount Battalion of The Royal Montreal Regiment. He resigned as president in autumn 1924 due to illness.

== Death and legacy ==
Confined to home for most of the winter, Granger died from heart failure on April 24, 1925, at his residence in Westmount. The Gazette described Granger as "having the gift of making friends in all walks of life in business as in sport", respected for his opinions as a frequent speaker at sport association meetings, and was "one of Montreal's most popular businessmen". The Montreal AAA halted all activities at its clubhouse during a memorial service at Granger's residence, which was reported by The Gazette to be one of the largest funerals ever known in Montreal. His remains were cremated at Mount Royal Cemetery.

The Montreal AAA Lawn Bowling Club posthumously honoured Granger in September 1925, with the establishment of the W. R. Granger Memorial Trophy for doubles competition.
