= 1893 U.S. National Championships (tennis) =

- Date: June 20 – 23 (WS, WD, MX); July 25 – 29 (MD); August 22 – 28 (MS)
- Edition: 13th
- Category: Grand Slam
- Surface: Grass / outdoor
- Location: Philadelphia, PA (WS, WD, MX); Chicago, IL (MD); Newport, R.I. (MS)

Champions

Men's singles
- (United States) Robert Wrenn

Women's singles
- (United States) Aline Terry

Men's doubles
- (United States) Clarence Hobart / (United States) Fred Hovey

Women's doubles
- (United States) Aline Terry / (United States) Harriet Butler

Mixed doubles
- (United States) Ellen Roosevelt / (United States) Clarence Hobart
- U.S. National Championships

The 1893 U.S. National Championships (now known as the US Open) was a tennis tournament that took place from June to August of 1893. The women's singles and doubles events, as well as the mixed doubles, were held from June 20 to June 23 on the outdoor grass courts at the Philadelphia Cricket Club in Philadelphia, Pennsylvania. The men's tournament began with the doubles event rather than the singles. The men's doubles event was played at the St. George Cricket Club in Chicago from July 25 through July 29. The men's singles competition was held from August 22 to August 28 on the outdoor grass courts at the Newport Casino in Newport, Rhode Island. It was the 13th U.S. National Championships and the second Grand Slam tournament of the year.

== Finals ==
=== Men's singles ===
(United States) Robert Wrenn defeated (United States) Oliver Campbell w/o

=== Women's singles ===
(United States) Aline Terry defeated (United States) Augusta Schultz 6–1, 6–3

=== Men's doubles ===
(United States) Clarence Hobart / (United States) Fred Hovey defeated (United States) Oliver Campbell / (United States) Bob Huntington 6–4, 6–4, 4–6, 6–2

=== Women's doubles ===
(United States) Aline Terry / (United States) Harriet Butler defeated (United States) Augusta Schultz / (United States) Ms Stone 6–4, 6–3

=== Mixed doubles ===
(United States) Ellen Roosevelt / (United States) Clarence Hobart defeated (United States) Ethel Bankson / (United States) Robert Willson Jr. 6–1, 4–6, 10–8, 6–1

Preceded by 1893 Wimbledon Championships	Grand Slams	Succeeded by 1894 Wimbledon Championships
