= Calder Cup =

American Hockey League championship trophy

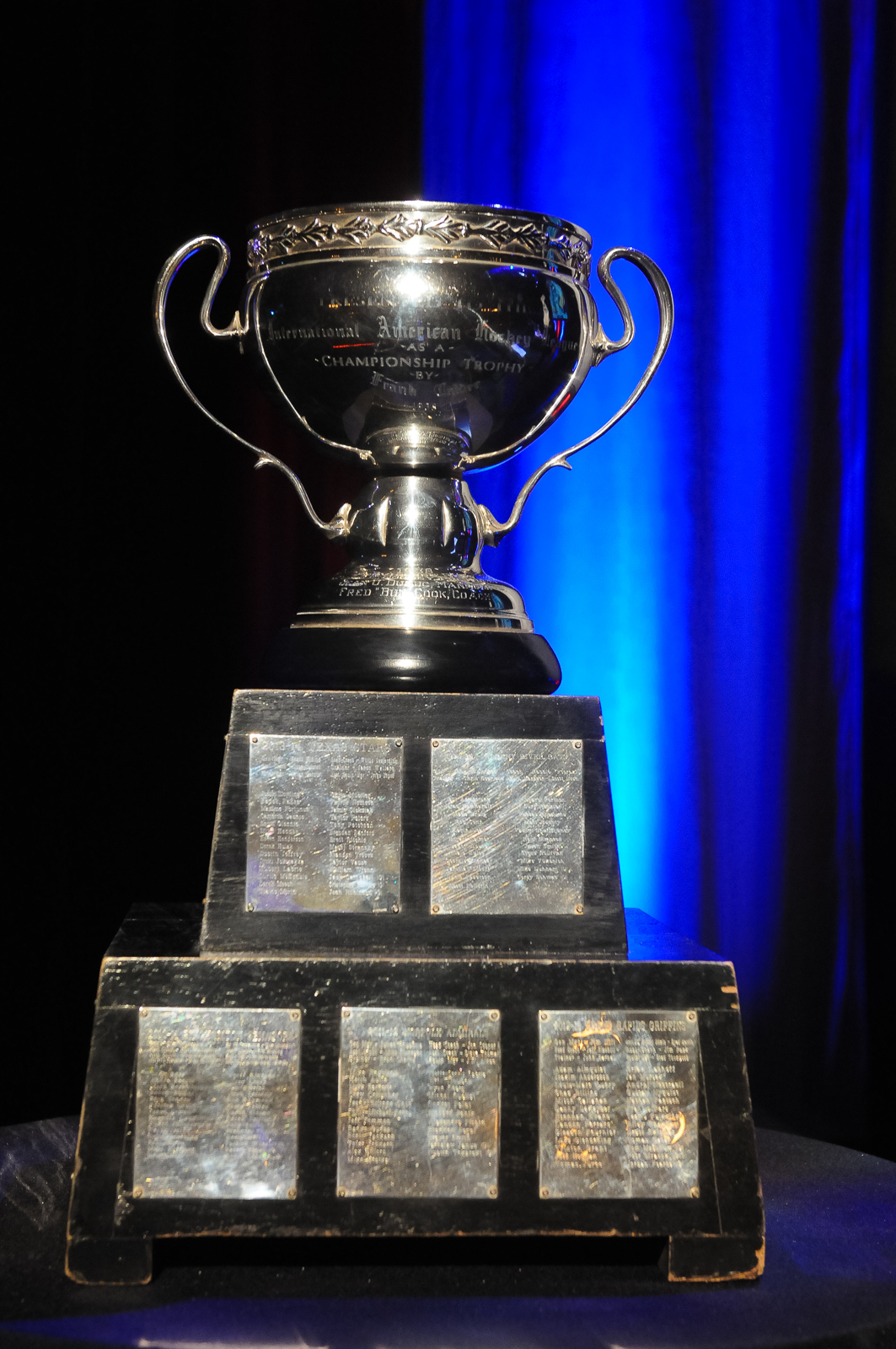
- Sport: Ice hockey
- Competition: Calder Cup playoffs
- Awarded for: Winner of the American Hockey League playoffs

History
- First award: 1937
- First winner: Syracuse Stars
- Most wins: Hershey Bears (13)
- Most recent: Toronto Marlies (2)

The Calder Cup is the trophy awarded annually to the playoff champions of the American Hockey League (AHL). It was first presented in 1937 to the Syracuse Stars. (Note: The Canadian-American Hockey League and International Hockey League played interlocking schedules in 1936–37 and 1937–38 under the name "International-American Hockey League" (IAHL) and simultaneously established the Calder Cup as the playoff championship trophy for the combined circuit. After two seasons under this makeshift arrangement, the two leagues formally merged as the IAHL in June, 1938, and two years later changed its name to its current one, the American Hockey League, effective with the 1940–41 season retaining the Calder Cup as its playoff trophy.)

The cup is made of sterling silver mounted on a base of Brazilian mahogany. In its current shape, the trophy has a two-tiered square base with commemorative plaques for each of the AHL's 20 most recent champions: 12 on the bottom tier and 8 on the top tier. Each time a new championship plaque is added, the oldest plaque is retired and joins a display at the Hockey Hall of Fame in Toronto.

The Hershey Bears have won the Cup more times than any other team, with thirteen victories in franchise history. The Cleveland Barons come in second with nine; the Springfield Indians/Kings are third with seven. Eight teams have won back-to-back championships; the Springfield Indians of 1960–62 are the only team to have won three straight Calder Cup championships.

On three occasions an AHL club has won the Calder Cup coincidentally with its NHL affiliate winning the Stanley Cup: in 1976 and 1977 when the Montreal Canadiens and their AHL affiliate, the Nova Scotia Voyageurs both won, and in 1995, when the New Jersey Devils and Albany River Rats both won. This also occurred within the ECHL, with its ECHL affiliate winning the Kelly Cup: in 2009 when the South Carolina Stingrays and their AHL affiliate, the Hershey Bears, both won.

The Calder Cup was not awarded in 2020 and 2021 as the AHL did not hold a playoff due to effects of the COVID-19 pandemic.

== History ==
The trophy is named after Frank Calder, who was the first president of the National Hockey League. The Calder Memorial Trophy, which is awarded annually to the Rookie of the Year in the National Hockey League, was also named after Calder.

As a result of the COVID-19 pandemic, the 2019–20 AHL season was cancelled and the Calder Cup was not awarded in 2020. Previously, it had been the oldest continuously awarded professional ice hockey playoff trophy, having been presented annually from 1936–37 to 2018–19. (Note: The Stanley Cup was first awarded in 1893 to the Montreal Hockey Club, the champions of the Amateur Hockey Association of Canada. The NHL acquired exclusive control of the Stanley Cup as its playoff championship trophy in 1927, and has awarded it annually since then, except for 2005 when there was no season or tournament because of the 2004–05 NHL lockout. The Calder Cup had been presented annually without interruption by the AHL since it was first awarded in 1937, henceforth it was the oldest continuously awarded trophy in North American professional hockey.)

== See also ==
- List of Calder Cup champions
