= 1893 U.S. National Championships – Women's singles =

Women's singles
- 1893 U.S. National Championships

Final
- Champion: (United States) Aline Terry
- Runner-up: (United States) Augusta Schultz
- Score: 6–1, 6–3

Details
- Draw: 17 + CR
- Seeds: –

Events
Singles	men	women
Doubles	men	women
- U.S. National Championships

Aline Terry won the singles tennis title by defeating Augusta Schultz 6–1, 6–3 in the final of the All Comers' tournament of the 1893 U.S. Women's National Singles Championship. Reigning champion Mabel Cahill did not participate and could therefore not defend her title in the challenge round. (Note: Reports differ as to the reason for Cahill's absence. According to the New York Times she was not pleased with the way she was treated during the previous edition of the tournament while a report in The Roanoke Times mentioned she could not play due to illness.) The tournament was played on outdoor grass courts and held at the Philadelphia Cricket Club in Wissahickon Heights, Chestnut Hill, Philadelphia from June 20 through June 23, 1893.

== Draw ==
=== All Comers' finals ===
Quarterfinals
(United States) Augusta Schultz	6	6
(United States) Annabella Wistar	3	1
(United States) Miss Bent	6	4	7
(United States) Miss Underhill	4	6	9
(United States) Aline Terry	6	6
(United States) Hattie Beaumont	2	0
(United States) Elizabeth Moore	7	1	6
(United States) Helen Hellwig	5	6	4

Semifinals
(United States) Augusta Schultz	6	3	6
(United States) Miss Underhill	2	6	0
(United States) Aline Terry	6	4	6
(United States) Elizabeth Moore	3	6	4

Finals
(United States) Augusta Schultz	1	3
(United States) Aline Terry	6	6

== Notes ==
Preceded by 1893 Wimbledon Championships – Women's singles	Grand Slam women's singles	Succeeded by 1894 Wimbledon Championships – Women's singles
