= Samuel T. Chase =

American tennis player

Samuel Chase
- Full name: Samuel Thompson Chase
- Country (sports): United States
- Born: September 14, 1868; Chicago, Illinois
- Died: May 9, 1937 (aged 68); Chicago, Illinois
- Turned pro: 1887 (amateur tour)
- Retired: 1903

Singles

Grand Slam singles results
- US Open: SF (1893)

Samuel Thompson Chase (September 14, 1868 – May 9, 1937) was an American tennis player active in the late 19th century.

== Tennis career ==
Chase reached the semifinals of the U.S. National Championships in 1893 and the quarterfinals in 1892.
