= Jay Johnson Morrow =

United States Army general

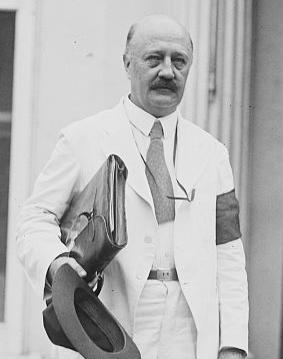
- Gov. J.J. Morrow of Canal Zone

3rd Governor of the Panama Canal Zone
- In office 1921–1924
- Preceded by: Chester Harding
- Succeeded by: Meriwether Lewis Walker

Engineer Commissioner of the District of Columbia
- In office May 2, 1907 – December 21, 1908
- Preceded by: John Biddle
- Succeeded by: Spencer Cosby

Personal details
- Born: February 20, 1870 Fairview, West Virginia, U.S.
- Died: April 16, 1937 (aged 67) Coco Solo, Panama Canal Zone
- Spouse: Harriet McMullen Butler
- Profession: military engineer, politician

Military service
- Branch/service: United States Army
- Years of service: 1891–1922
- Rank: Brigadier general
- Commands: Chief Engineer of the United States First Army and as Deputy Chief Engineer of the American Expeditionary Force
- Battles/wars: World War I

Jay Johnson Morrow (February 20, 1870 – April 16, 1937) was an American military engineer who was Chief Engineer of the United States First Army and Deputy Chief Engineer of the American Expeditionary Force during World War I and Governor of the Panama Canal Zone from 1921 to 1924.

== Early life and family ==
He was born on February 20, 1870, in Fairview, West Virginia. He was of Scots-Irish descent. He was the brother of U.S. Senator and Diplomat Dwight Morrow and uncle of Anne Morrow Lindbergh.

== Military career ==
He graduated fifth in a class of 65 from the United States Military Academy at West Point in 1891. He was then commissioned in the U.S. Army Corps of Engineers.

He was an instructor in military engineering at the United States Military Academy from 1895 to 1896.

He served as military governor of the Philippine Province of Zamboanga from 1901 to 1902.

He served as Engineering Commissioner in the District of Columbia from 1907 to 1909.

During World War I, he served as Chief Engineer of First Army and as Deputy Chief Engineer of the American Expeditionary Force.

He was Governor of the Panama Canal Zone from 1921 to 1924.

== Personal life ==
Morrow married Harriet McMullen Butler on October 15, 1895. She was the daughter of Brigadier General John Gazzam Butler and Eliza Jane Miller Warnick. She was also the granddaughter of Charles Ward Warnick and Mary Ann Miller.

Morrow and his wife, who died in 1935, were residents of Englewood, New Jersey.

== Death and legacy ==
He died on April 16, 1937. His ashes were scattered over the Chagres River, which feeds into the Panama Canal.

== External links/Sources ==
- Panama Canal Authority biography
