= Chester Harding (governor) =

American army officer, engineer and politician (1866–1936)

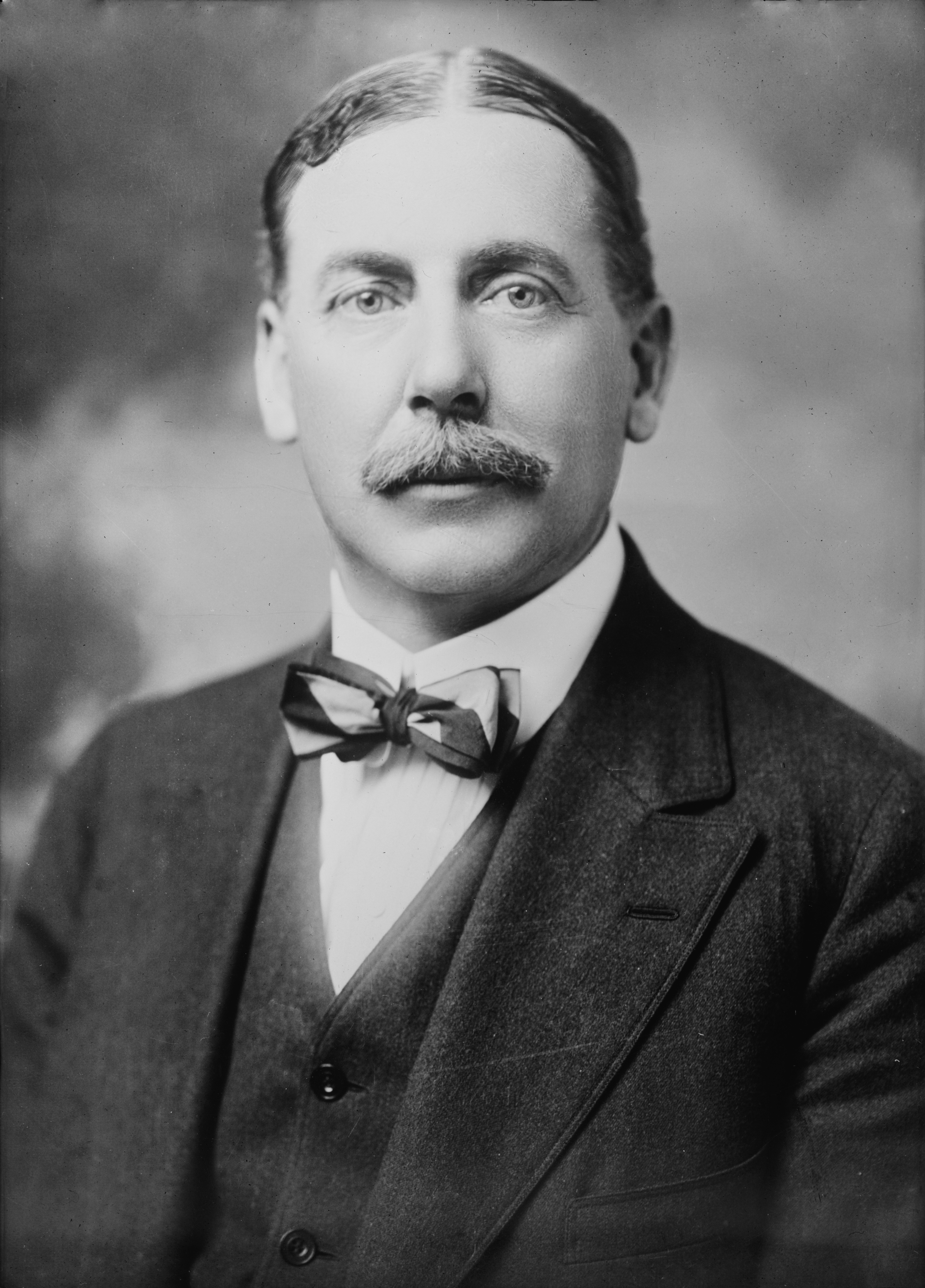
- Harding in 1917

2nd Governor of Panama Canal Zone
- In office 1917–1921
- Preceded by: George Washington Goethals
- Succeeded by: Jay Johnson Morrow

Engineer Commissioner of the District of Columbia
- In office February 2, 1913 – October 31, 1914
- Preceded by: William Voorhees Judson
- Succeeded by: Charles Willauer Kutz

Personal details
- Born: December 31, 1866 Enterprise, Mississippi, U.S.
- Died: November 11, 1936 (aged 69) Whitinsville, Massachusetts, U.S.
- Resting place: Arlington National Cemetery
- Relations: William P. G. Harding (brother); Chester Harding (grandfather)
- Profession: Military, engineer, politician

Military service
- Branch/service: United States Army
- Years of service: 1889–1920
- Rank: Brigadier General
- Battles/wars: Spanish–American War; World War I

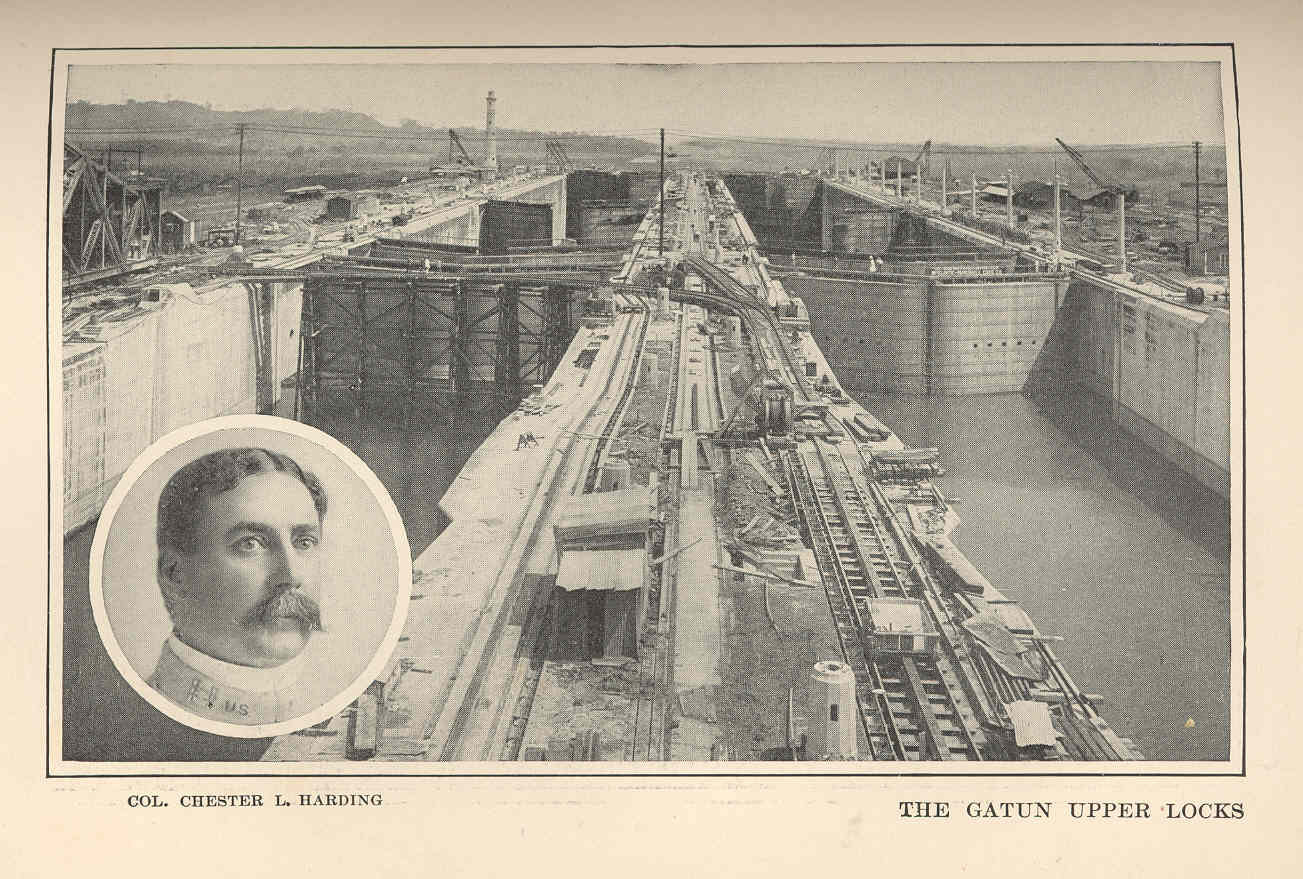
Harding and the Gatun Upper Locks in a book from 1913

Chester Harding (December 31, 1866 – November 11, 1936) was an American civil engineer who managed the construction of Gatun locks (1907-1913) and later was Governor of the Panama Canal Zone from 1917 to 1921.

== Biography ==
Harding was born on December 31, 1866, in Enterprise, Mississippi. His father was a civil engineer, and his older brother William P. G. Harding later became the second chair of the Federal Reserve.

His early education had been supplemented by training from his father at home; Chester Harding completed the requirements for a bachelor's degree in Engineering from the University of Alabama in 1884 while only seventeen years old. He later graduated fourth in his class of 49 from the United States Military Academy at West Point in 1889. Harding was commissioned in the U.S. Army Corps of Engineers.

Harding taught civil and military engineering at West Point from August 1896 to February 1899. During the Spanish–American War, he was temporarily reassigned to the defense of Narragansett Bay in Rhode Island. Harding was promoted to major in June 1906. He taught civil engineering at the Army Engineer School from October 1906 to July 1907.

Harding was appointed Division Engineer of the Gatun Locks Division in 1907. He was promoted to lieutenant colonel in February 1913. Harding served a term from 1913 to 1914 as one of the commissioners in charge of the District of Columbia.

Harding was appointed the Panama Canal maintenance engineer in January 1915. He then served as governor of the Panama Canal Zone from January 1917 to March 1921. Harding was promoted to colonel in May 1917. He retired from active duty in the Army on March 31, 1920, and was advanced to brigadier general on the retired list the following day. Harding completed the last year of his gubernatorial term as a civilian.

During his later years, Harding lived in Vineyard Haven, Massachusetts. He took up portrait painting, which had been the profession of his grandfather Chester Harding, and received training at Boston and Paris from 1923 to 1927. Harding painted portraits of the first four Canal Zone governors: George Washington Goethals, Jay Johnson Morrow, Meriwether Lewis Walker and a self-portrait.

Harding died on November 11, 1936, in Whitinsville, Massachusetts. He was interred at Arlington National Cemetery three days later.

Preceded by George Washington Goethals	Governor of Panama Canal Zone; 1917–1921	Succeeded by Jay Johnson Morrow
