= 1893 Stanley Cup championship =

1893 ice hockey championship series

The Stanley Cup, then named the Dominion Hockey Challenge Cup, was first awarded in 1893 to the Montreal Hockey Club of the Amateur Hockey Association of Canada (AHAC) at the end of the 1893 AHAC season for having placed first in the standings with a 7–1–0 record. The season ended on March 17, but Montreal was officially presented with the trophy on May 15.

== AHAC standings ==
=== Final standing ===
Team	Games Played	Wins	Losses	Ties	Goals For	Goals Against
Montreal Hockey Club	8	7	1	0	36	18
Ottawa Hockey Club	8	6	2	0	49	22
Montreal Crystals	8	3	5	0	25	34
Quebec Hockey Club	8	2	5	1	23	46
Montreal Victorias	8	1	6	1	20	35

== Refusal of the Stanley Cup ==
The Montreal Hockey Club was affiliated with the Montreal Amateur Athletic Association. In April 1893, the Stanley Cup was ready for presentation for its first winners. The cup's trustees, P. D. Ross and John Sweetland, made preparations to present the Cup to the Montreal Amateur Athletic Association (MAAA) on May 15, 1893, at the association's general meeting. However, behind the scenes, the members of the Montreal Hockey Club (MHC), told the MAAA board of directors not to accept the trophy as they wished to receive the trophy themselves and to wait until Club representatives "had an opportunity of learning the conditions upon which the said trophy was to be held." MAAA president James A. Taylor refused both demands and the MAAA board of directors met and agreed to accept the trophy at the annual meeting. The Cup was presented to MAAA president Taylor, instead of MHC president James Stewart.

The Cup remained in the possession of the MAAA. At the same annual meeting that the MAAA had accepted the Cup, Goalie Tom Paton was named president of the MAAA. Paton raised the matter of the refusal in November to the MAAA, and a MAAA sub-committee met with the MHC. According to the committee, the Club felt slighted that it had been communicated with directly by the Cup trustees and would not accept the trophy unless all differences between the MHC and the MAAA were resolved.

At that time, the MHC made a request for a loan of $175 to cover season start-up expenses. The MAAA refused the loan, apparently the first time that the MAAA had refused the MHC any request. The MAAA decided to ask the Stanley Cup trustees for advice, and before they did, the MHC wrote to the trustees, stating that the club had not received the trophy and "would like to know when to apply for same." Cup trustee Ross replied that they were willing to receive any advice "to aid in the proper execution of Lord Stanley's wish to present this Cup to the champions of the Dominion."

The Cup transfer was settled in February 1894 when Ross travelled to Montreal to attend the AHAC meetings and attend a hockey game with his brother Jim Ross, who was a MAAA board member. Ross met with MHC president Stewart as well. After the meetings, letters from Sweetland and Ross were sent to both the MAAA and to the MHC. Sweetland and Ross asked that the MAAA "are hereby requested and authorized to deliver the Stanley hockey challenge cup, which they have kindly had in their care, to the order of Mr. J. A. Stewart, president of the Montreal Hockey Club."

The club received the trophy between March 5 and March 15, 1894. But the matter did not end there. On March 22, MHC defeated Ottawa to retain the trophy. The club, per the Cup conditions, arranged to have its name engraved on the Cup. The engraving was simply "Montreal 1894", omitting the MAAA of the 1893 engraving. When the MHC secretary asked the MAAA if the club's annual report was needed for the MAAA annual report, the MAAA board said it was not, as it was understood that the Club did not want to be connected in any way with the Association. The MAAA board attempted to effect a compromise whereby the club would become a "department" of the Association but this was defeated. The Club instead decided to become an "affiliate" of the MAAA on its own terms. The MAAA refused the application to affiliate the club, as all members of the club were already MAAA members.

== Stanley Cup engraving ==
1893 Montreal Hockey Club

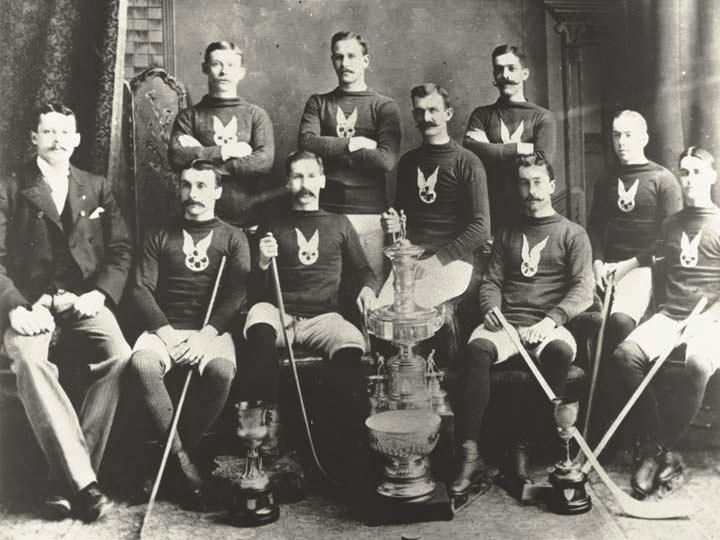
1893 Stanley Cup Champions Montreal HC

=== Players ===
Forwards

- Billy Barlow
- Archie Hodgson
- Alex Irving
- Alex Kingan
- George Low
- Haviland Routh

Defencemen

- Allan Cameron (cover point)
- James Stewart (point – playing President of HC)

Goaltenders

Tom Paton

=== Coaching and administrative staff ===
- Harry Shaw (Manager/Secretary-Treasurer)
- James A. Taylor (President of the AAA)

=== Stanley Cup engraving ===
Montreal A.A.A.

- 1893

== Stanley Cup Centennial ==
The 100th anniversary of the Stanley Cup was celebrated during the 1992–93 NHL season. Each player wore a patch on their jersey throughout the season, depicted an unnamed player wearing a jersey with the NHL shield and hoisting the Stanley Cup. The 1993 Stanley Cup Final logo included the words "Stanley Cup Centennial".
