= 1893 Grand National =

English steeplechase horse race

- Grand National
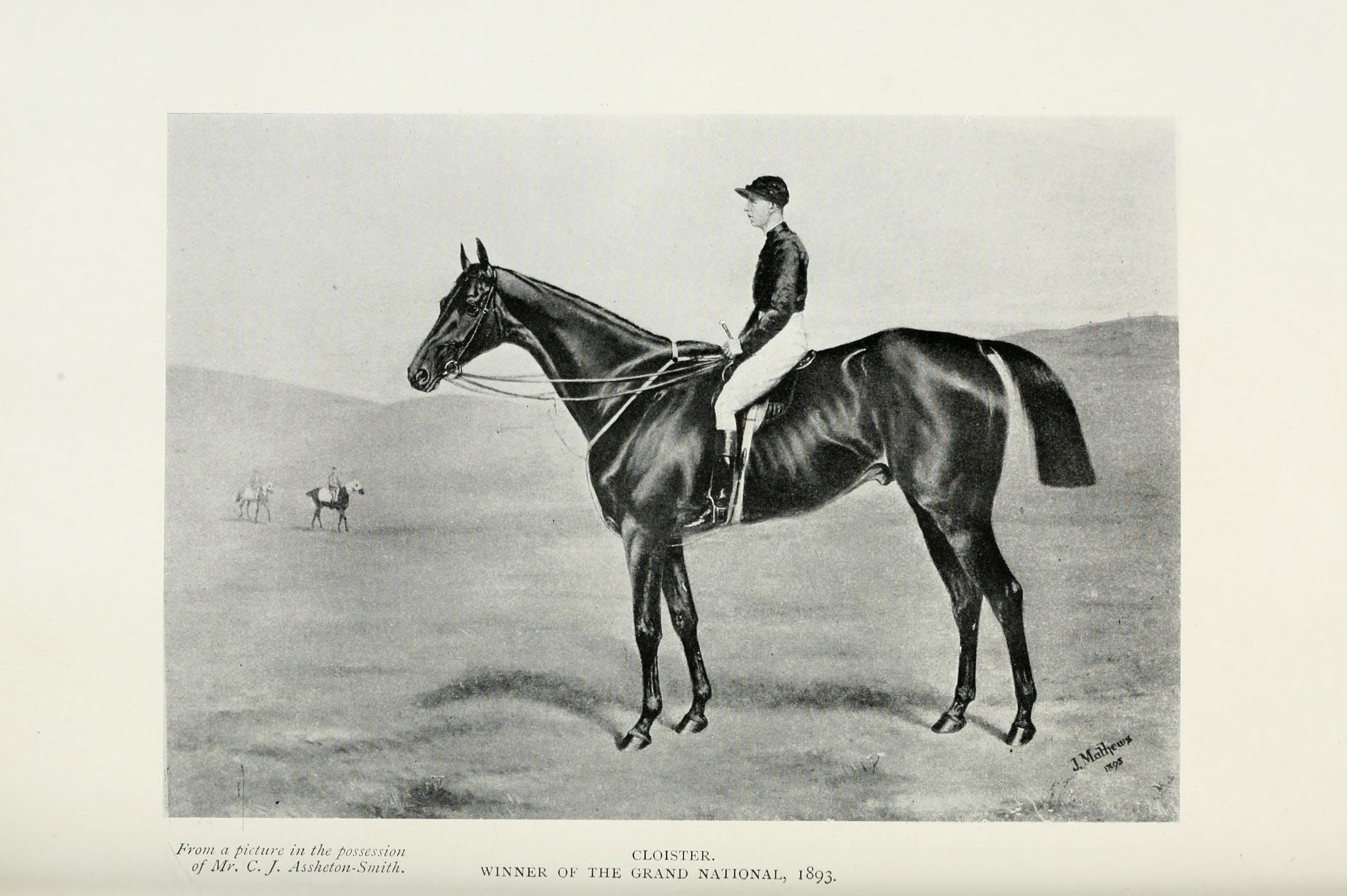
- Cloister (from Heroes and heroines of the Grand National)
- Location: Aintree
- Date: 24 March 1893
- Winning horse: Cloister
- Starting price: 9/2 F
- Jockey: Bill Dollery
- Trainer: Arthur Yates
- Owner: (Wales) Charles Duff
- Conditions: Firm

The 1893 Grand National was the 55th renewal of the Grand National horse race that took place at Aintree near Liverpool, England, on 24 March 1893.

Owner Charles Duff went on to field two more winners in 1912 and 1913, when he had become Sir Charles Assheton-Smith.

== Finishing Order ==
Position	Name	Jockey	Age	Handicap (st-lb)	SP	Distance
01	Cloister	Bill Dollery	9	12-7	9/2	40 lengths
02	Aesop	Arthur Barker	?	10-4	100/12	
03	Why Not	Arthur Nightingall	?	11-12	5/1	
04	Tit For Tat	George Williamson	?	10-0	25/1	
05	The Midshipmite	Billy Sensier	?	12-3	100/15	
06	Father O'Flynn	Mr GB Milne	?	11-11	100/9	
07	Roman Oak	Mr WP Cullen	?	11-9	40/1	
08	Faust	Capt John Yardley	?	10-6	33/1	Last to complete

== Non-finishers ==
Fence	Name	Jockey	Age	Handicap (st-lb)	SP	Fate
28	Field Marshal	Capt E Crawley	?	11-4	28/1	Pulled Up
03	The Primate	Mr Percy Bewicke	?	11-3	100/7	Fell
07	Lady Helen	Robert Nightingall	?	11-1	50/1	Fell
20	Chouleur	Terry Kavanagh	?	10-13	100/1	Pulled Up
15	Joan of Arc	George Morris	?	10-4	50/1	Fell
18	Golden Gate	George Mawson	?	10-2	33/1	Pulled Up
02	Golden Link	N Behan	?	10-0	100/1	Refused
