= Joseph M. Gazzam =

American politician

Joseph Murphy Gazzam
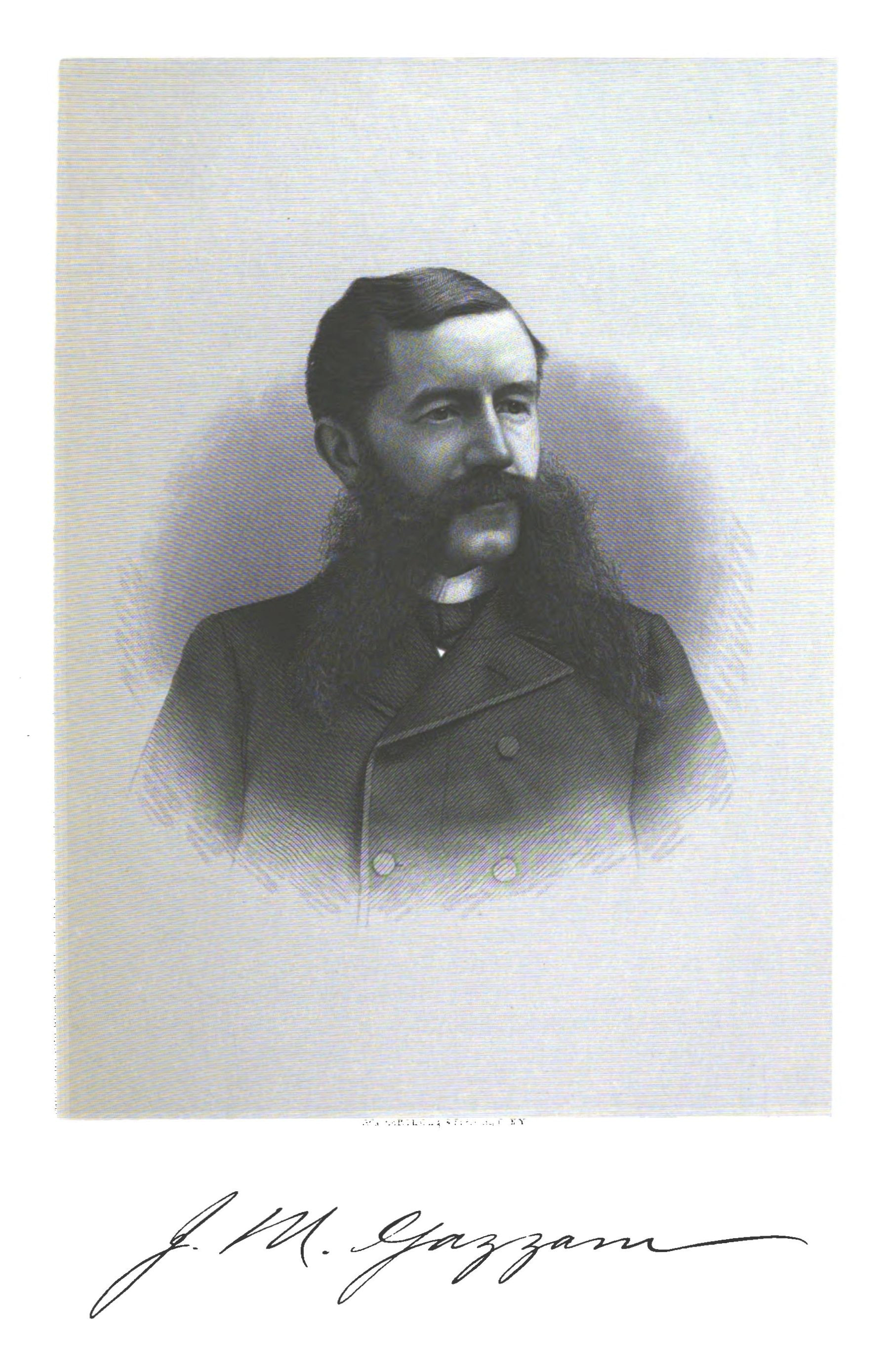
- Joseph M. Gazzam, 1902
- Born: December 2, 1842; Pittsburgh, Pennsylvania, U.S.
- Died: September 25, 1927 (aged 84); Philadelphia, Pennsylvania, U.S.
- Occupations: American lawyer, politician, and businessman

Joseph Murphy Gazzam (December 2, 1842 – September 25, 1927) was an American lawyer, politician, and businessman.

== Early life ==
Joseph M. Gazzam was born in Pittsburgh on December 2, 1842, the son of Dr. Edward D. Gazzam (1803-1878), an abolitionist and politician, and Elizabeth Antoinette de Beelen (1818-1871); he was the last of three children. Joseph was a sickly child and was educated at home until he was fourteen. He then attended Western University of Pennsylvania, leaving after three and a half years for reasons of health.

== Career ==
After studying law in Pittsburgh with lawyer David Reed, he was admitted to the Allegheny County bar in January 1864. He served as a solicitor for many Pittsburgh businesses, including banks and insurance companies. In 1870 he became the youngest Pennsylvanian ever to be admitted to practice before the Supreme Court. In 1876 he was elected to the Pittsburgh City Council from the First Ward. From 1877 to 1880 he served as a Republican in the State Senate.

Gazzam was also active in Pittsburgh social life, being president of the Pittsburgh Gymnastic Association and the Hygeia Base Ball Club, as well as being an officer or director in a number of other organizations.

On October 30, 1878, Gazzam married Mary Anna Reading (1852-1907), daughter of banker John Grandin Reading (1812-1891). In 1879 Gazzam's law partner Alexander G. Cochran moved to St. Louis, and Gazzam moved to Philadelphia and became more involved with business. His new law partner, state and US senator William A. Wallace had interests in Pennsylvania coal fields. Gazzam, Wallace, and his father-in-law were all incorporators of what was to become the Beech Creek Railroad in 1882, a venture of William H. Vanderbilt to bring coal from Pennsylvania's Clearfield Coalfield into the New York Central system. The company town at the terminus of the line was named "Gazzam" by the Clearfield Bituminous Coal Company. Gazzam served as president of a long list of corporations, including the Wilkes-Barre and Eastern Railroad, the New York and Fort Lee Railroad (another Vanderbilt road), the Rees Welsh Law & Digest Publishing Company of Philadelphia, the Rennyson Tredyffrin Lithia Water Company of Philadelphia, and others.

Gazzam was also involved in the reorganization of the Philadelphia & Chester County Railroad in 1885; he was a trustee, and a director after it was relaunched as the Philadelphia Midland Railroad. This became the Philadelphia and Delaware County Railroad (1890–1913) in 1890 and was absorbed by the Pennsylvania Railroad. Gazzam was a business partner to A. O. Granger, in mining and railroads.

In 1889 Gazzam spent time in Asheville, North Carolina and built the original Kenilworth Inn hotel there. A major stockholder was George Washington Vanderbilt II, who was beginning construction on the Biltmore Estate nearby. Gazzam later purchased the hotel outright and developed the land around the hotel. When the hotel burned down in 1909, Gazzam jumped from a third floor window to escape and was severely injured.

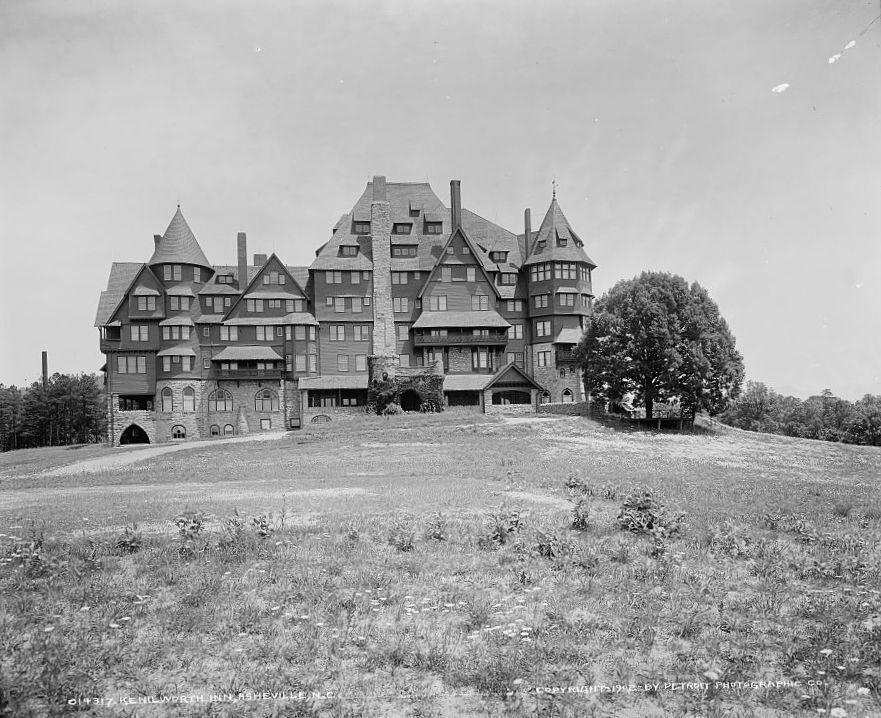
Kenilworth Inn, Asheville, NC, in 1902

Gazzam was appointed to the commission in charge of Pennsylvania's participation for several World's fairs, including the South Carolina Inter-State and West Indian Exposition of 1902 and the 1904 Louisiana Purchase Exposition in St. Louis.

== Family ==
Gazzam and his first wife Anna Reading had two children, Sada Sarah Reading Murphy Grandin (1879–80) who died in infancy and Antoinette Elizabeth (1883-1940). Anna Reading Gazzam was later successfully sued for alienation of affections by Elizabeth Reading, the wife of a distant cousin of Anna's named Charlton Reading; the relationship was thought to have begun around 1890. John Grandin Reading died January 27, 1891, and Anna reportedly inherited two million dollars from him. The Gazzams were divorced on June 8, 1892. The divorce was acrimonious; Anna sued Joseph over the disposition of part of her father's estate, and upon her death in 1907, her will contained a provision warning her daughter Antoinette's guardians to keep her away from her father.

Anna Reading Gazzam was the author of a novel, A Sketch in the Ideal (1891) and several books of poetry, Night Etchings (1892) and Gleams and Echoes (1903).

Antoinette Gazzam became an object of public attention after she inherited a substantial fortune from her mother (reports varied from $1,250,000 to $3,000,000.) She resided alone in her mother's mansion in Cornwall-on-Hudson, New York, near Storm King Mountain. She was, like her mother, sued for alienation of attentions, in her case by the wife of a man named Marshall Clark, also known as "Niblo the Palmist". In March 1910 it was announced she was searching for a husband, and she received letters from all over the nation applying. Later that year she married an engineer named Charles Galvin and was reconciled with her father, whom she had not seen since she was eight years old.

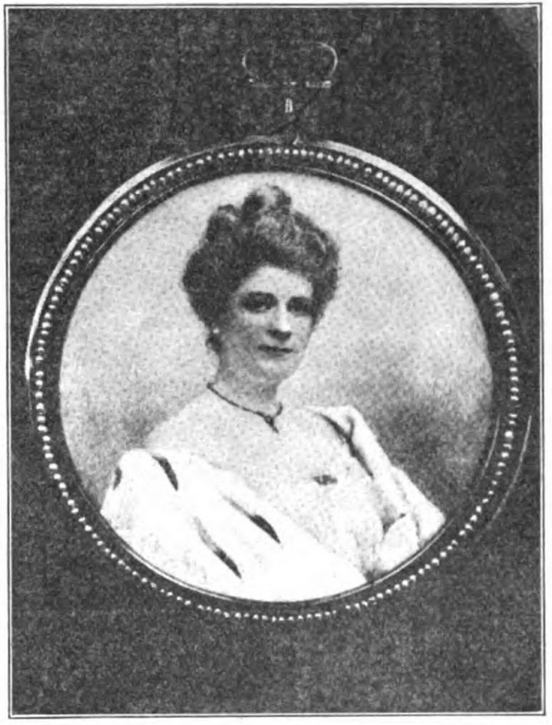
Nellie Andrews Gazzam

Joseph Gazzam was married to Nellie Mae Reed Andrews (1868-1957) on September 7, 1893. She was later active in the temperance movement, and a leader in suffrage war relief work. Joseph Gazzam and Nellie Mae Gazzam's children were Joseph M. Gazzam (1895-1960) and Olivia May de Beelen Gazzam (1896-1999).

Joseph M. Gazzam died at his home in Philadelphia on September 25, 1927.
