= Montreal Winter Carnivals =

The Montreal Winter Carnivals were week-long social and recreational festivals held during the 1880s in the city of Montreal, Quebec, Canada. Organized largely by the city's sporting clubs, the Winter Carnivals were centered on winter sports and other activities such as tobogganing and snowshoeing. More than this however, the carnivals helped to establish Montreal as a winter destination during the late nineteenth century.

== Purpose ==
The Montreal Winter Carnivals were held in 1883, 1884, 1885, 1887, and 1889. Originally conceived of by Robert D. McGibbon, a lawyer and member of the Montreal Snow Shoe Club, these carnivals were meant to showcase Canadian sports and outdoor activities unique to Montreal. The goals behind such an endeavor was specifically said to be recreational, touristic, and economic, as well as having an additional influence on the establishment of Canadian national identity. On average, roughly 50,00 spectators would arrive for the week in late January or early February, a large percentage of whom were from the United States and Europe, all wishing to view and take part in the activities.

== Planning and advertisement ==
Carnivals would last generally six days, and followed a detailed plan that changed little from year to year. Planning for such an event would begin in September of the previous year, and required heavy investment from local clubs. Once this was established they commenced building the monuments and locations that would be central to the event, including the ice rinks, tobogganing slides, and the impressive ice castles were the highlights of each year. Advertisements also helped to create awareness about the event, and some were targeted directly at American tourists unfamiliar with Canadian sports. These would primarily glorified winter sports and activities, establishing them as emblematic of a Canadian culture that emphasized outdoor life and rugged beauty.

== Program ==
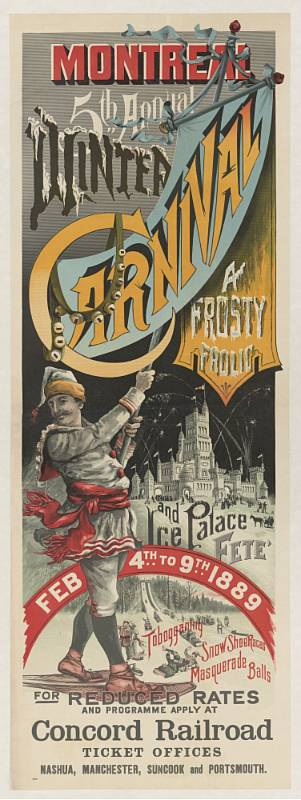
1889 Poster

Winter sports were the most prominent aspect of the carnival, most notably curling, skating, hockey, snowshoeing, tobogganing and even lacrosse in one year (despite being a summer sport.) Tobogganing in particular was heavily emphasized during the Carnival because it was a sport that was not only uniquely Canadian, but also could be the majority of social classes. Women were encouraged to freely participate in tobogganing provided a man was steering (or commanding) the toboggan, and velvet seats in fact could be added in order to increase comfort and make the activity more "feminine". While all social classes could technically find a hill and toboggan, clubs such as the Montreal Toboggan Club maintained a significant separation between themselves and the lower classes. Large slides were constructed, and privatized by the sports clubs that owned them, ensuring that only those wealthy enough could take part. However, during the carnival week, visitors could be guided by club members and were allowed to use the facilities.

The highlight of the carnivals were the ice palaces, constructed each year in Dominion Square. These massive castles were made of over 10,000 blocks of ice and generally around 150 ft in length and were the centerpieces for the festivities. At the climax of Carnival week the ice palace would be site of a great battle, a siege, between "armies" of hundreds of snow-shod soldiers. As the crowds gathered in Dominion Square, the attacking army would approach and arrange in attacking formations outside the castle. The defending soldiers would line the walls and prepare for the oncoming siege. As the battle began, fireworks would be launched both from both armies, and from the walls of the castle. The spectacular light show was described as a "fairy land," with the fireworks and burning colored lights turning the sky into a "rainbow hue" that lasted half an hour. As the battle came to a close, the attacking army would overtake the palace and claim victory. The battle over, both sides would converge and begin a torch-lit snow shoe walk up Mount Royal. From there, more fireworks were set off before the train worked its way back down the mountain. This battle and subsequent walk would be the climax of the Winter Carnival, and the ice palace that served as setting was certainly seen as a landmark of the Carnivals by locals and tourists alike.

== Discontinuation ==
As time went on, the Montreal Winter Carnivals became much more difficult to sustain. The sports clubs and carnival planners were unable to gather the necessary funding to hold carnivals on a regular basis. In addition, sporting celebrations of this type were beginning to become fairly widespread, lessening the novelty of the Montreal Winter Carnival. In 1885, in part due to an outbreak of smallpox in the summer before, the carnival failed to draw the crowds and revenue that it had in the two previous years. The next carnival in 1887 and the final in 1889, were unable to establish themselves within the cultural practices of Montrealers of the time. Furthermore, as some historians suggest, the Montreal Winter Carnivals lacked the spirit of local culture that had made carnivals popular within the city, but had rather they had become far too commercial.
