= Harriet Butler =

American tennis player (1873–1935)

Harriet McMillan Butler (June 7, 1873 – May 11, 1935) was an American tennis player of the end of the 19th century. Notably, she won the US Women's National Championship in 1893 in women's doubles with Aline Terry.

Butler was born at Fort Leavenworth, Kansas, to Brig. Gen. John G. Butler and Eliza Warnick.

She married General Jay Johnson Morrow in 1895 in Georgia. His brother, U.S. Senator Dwight Morrow, was the father of Anne Morrow Lindbergh, wife of aviator Charles Lindbergh. The Lindberghs had been staying at her home in Englewood, New Jersey, at the time of her death aged 61 in Interlaken, New Jersey, where she suffered a heart attack while visiting her niece.

== Grand Slam finals ==
=== Doubles (1 title) ===
Result	Year	Championship	Surface	Partner	Opponents	Score
Win	1893	U.S. National Championships	Grass	(United States) Aline Terry	(United States) Augusta Schultz (United States) M. Stone	6–4, 6–3
