= Baron Frederick Eugene de Beelen-Bertholf =

First Austrian minister to the United States

Frederick Eugene Francois, Baron de Beelen-Bertholf (1729 – 5 April 1805) was the first minister of the Habsburg Monarchy to the United States.

Born in the Austrian Netherlands, Beelen-Berfholf began his diplomatic career in 1748 as secretary to Prince Wenzel Anton von Kaunitz, Chancellor of Austria. Employed by the Empress Maria Theresa, he remained Kaunitz’s secretary when the Prince served as Ambassador to France, after which point Beelen-Berfholf acquired a series other diplomatic offices. Upon his father’s passing, he inherited the title of Baron. In 1780, after the Maria Theresa's death, he found favor with the newly ascended Emperor Joseph II, who sought to expand Austrian trade abroad. Joseph sent Beelen-Berfholf to the United States as Counsellor of Commerce.

He arrived in Philadelphia with his wife, Joanne-Marie Therese, and two children, Frederick Eugene Jr. and Constantine Antoine, in 1783. Beelen-Berfholf began sending reports back home detailing everything from the American socio-economic landscape to the latest fashion trends, alongside lists of merchants and records of their trading. Because of these efforts, Beelen-Berfholf was able to foster business relationships between American merchants and companies back in Europe. The family fortunes rose again when, growing rich from his endeavours, he purchased large amounts of land in Pennsylvania, Ohio, and Kentucky. Settling in Chester County, Pennsylvania., he began curating a botanical garden where he grew, imported, exported and experimented on various plants. His work in botany landed him an election to the American Philosophical Society in 1785. His luck ran out when his massive land holdings became a financial burden. He sold much of his estate in 1795, and relocated to West Manchester Township. In 1804, Beelen-Bertholf fell ill with yellow fever and died on April 7, 1805.
