= 1893 U.S. National Championships – Men's singles =

Men's singles
- 1893 U.S. National Championships

Final
- Champion: (United States) Robert Wrenn
- Runner-up: (United States) Oliver Campbell
- Score: w/o

Events
Singles	men	women
Doubles	men	women
← 1892 ·	U.S. National Championships	· 1894 →

Robert Wrenn defeated Fred Hovey in the all comers final, 6–4, 3–6, 6–4, 6–4 to win the men's singles tennis title at the 1893 U.S. National Championships. Three-time reigning champion Oliver Campbell did not defend his title.

== Draw ==
=== Challenge round ===
Challenge round
(United States) O Campbell
(United States) R Wrenn	w/o

=== Finals ===
Quarterfinals
(United States) R Wrenn	6	6	2	6
(United States) R Stevens	1	2	6	2
(United States) ST Chase	6	6	6
(United States) DW Candler	3	4	2
(United States) W Larned	3	4	6	7	2
(United States) C Hobart	6	6	3	5	6
(United States) F Hovey	6	5	8	6
(United States) VG Hall	2	7	6	2

Semifinals
(United States) R Wrenn	8	6	6
(United States) ST Chase	6	1	2
(United States) C Hobart	5	0	3
(United States) F Hovey	7	6	6

Final
(United States) R Wrenn	6	3	6	6
(United States) F Hovey	4	6	4	4

=== Earlier rounds ===
==== Section 1 ====
First round

Second round
(United States) S McCormick
(United States) GI Willis	w/o
FM Pile	0	0	0
MR Wright	6	6	6
(United States) R Wrenn	6	6	6
HH Dickey	1	0	0
GT Warren
(United States) S Reed	w/o

Third round
(United States) GI Willis	6	4	3	1
MR Wright	4	6	6	6
(United States) R Wrenn	6	6	6
(United States) S Reed	1	0	1

Fourth round
MR Wright	2	9	6	6	4
(United States) R Wrenn	6	11	4	3	6

==== Section 2 ====
First round

Second round
SVR Thayer	2	3	4
RC Thomas	6	6	6
(United States) C Tete	6	6	6
HC Clews	3	4	2
(United States) R Stevens	6	3	6	7
(United States) H McCormick	1	6	4	5
HM Billings
JS Morris	w/o

Third round
RC Thomas	6	4	4	3
(United States) C Tete	0	6	6	6
(United States) R Stevens	6	6	6
JS Morris	1	3	0

Fourth round
(United States) C Tete	2	0	1
(United States) R Stevens	6	6	6

==== Section 3 ====
First round

Second round
(United States) ST Chase	w/o
(United States) GC Hinckley
MA Agelasto
(United States) HD Cleveland	w/o
(United States) D Miller	6	6	6
SG Thompson	0	4	2
J Bertram
HH Pigott	w/o

Third round
(United States) ST Chase	6	6	6
(United States) HD Cleveland	2	0	2
(United States) D Miller	6	6	7
HH Pigott	1	2	5

Fourth round
(United States) ST Chase	6	6	6
(United States) D Miller	3	4	3

==== Section 4 ====
First round
WHA Willing	w/o
(United States) R Honey
(United States) E Colby	6	6	6
AW Cobb	1	4	1
OM Bostwick	6	6	6
EA Wilkie	1	0	0
JB Read	6	6	6
P Frazer	1	4	3
H Colby	w/o
CH Farnum
(United States) AWS Post	6	6	12
(United States) P Wright	3	3	10
(United States) J Talmage	6	6	6
H Bruen	2	1	0
(United States) DW Candler	6	3	6	6
ES Rushmore	3	6	2	1

Second round
WHA Willing	2	2	5
(United States) E Colby	6	6	7
OM Bostwick	5	1	2
JB Read	7	6	6
H Colby	6	6	8
(United States) AWS Post	4	8	6	r
(United States) J Talmage	6	4	0	3
(United States) DW Candler	4	6	6	6

Third round
(United States) E Colby	12	6	4	7
JB Read	10	2	6	5
H Colby	6	4	2	6	4
(United States) DW Candler	4	6	6	2	6

Fourth round
(United States) E Colby	1	4	4
(United States) DW Candler	6	6	6

==== Section 5 ====
First round
FK Ward	6	6	6
(United States) A Codman	0	1	0
(United States) G Herrick	6	4	7	6
AB Emmons	2	6	5	4
M Bruce	1	4	6	6	6
GC Hetz	6	6	3	4	3
F Donahue	w/o
EA Thompson
(United States) W Ames	w/o
(United States) CP Dodge
(United States) C Bunting	4	5	6	6	6
KS Green	6	7	1	1	3
(United States) W Larned	6	6	6
(United States) JC Davidson	3	4	4

Second round
FK Ward	2	6	6	6
(United States) G Herrick	6	1	3	3
M Bruce	w/o
F Donahue
(United States) W Ames	6	6	6
(United States) C Bunting	3	4	1
(United States) W Larned	2	6	6	6
(United States) M Chace	6	2	3	4

Third round
FK Ward	6	6	7
M Bruce	0	4	5
(United States) W Ames	10	1	4
(United States) W Larned	12	6	6

Fourth round
FK Ward	2	3	3
(United States) W Larned	6	6	6

==== Section 6 ====
First round

Second round
NNH Lord	0	0	2
(United States) C Hobart	6	6	6
W Parker	6	6	6
JA Fowler	1	2	4
GS Bryan	5	2	0
(United States) CR Budlong	7	6	6
AP Simmonds	11	7	6
SL Smith	9	5	4

Third round
(United States) C Hobart	6	8	6
W Parker	4	6	1
(United States) CR Budlong	6	6	6
AP Simmonds	2	0	2

Fourth round
(United States) C Hobart	6	6	6
(United States) CR Budlong	3	1	2

==== Section 7 ====
First round

Second round
(United States) QA Shaw	0	5	5
(United States) F Hovey	6	7	7
(United States) AE Foote	6	6	6
HS Russell	0	1	1
(United States) CE Sands	6	6	4	6
(United States) J Clark	4	2	6	3
(United States) J Howland	4	1	4
(United States) EL Hall	6	6	6

Third round
(United States) F Hovey	4	6	6	6
(United States) AE Foote	6	3	2	2
(United States) CE Sands	8	6	0	6	3
(United States) EL Hall	10	3	6	4	6

Fourth round
(United States) F Hovey	6	6	6
(United States) EL Hall	3	2	1

==== Section 8 ====
First round

Second round
(United States) VG Hall	6	6	6
HB Bartow	0	2	2
(United States) P Knapp
E Hewitt	w/o
F Whitall	6	7	8
GT Rice	4	5	2
GT Rice	3	2	1
WW Reece	6	6	6

Third round
(United States) VG Hall	6	7	6
E Hewitt	2	5	2
F Whitall	5	5	6	6	6
WW Reece	7	7	4	0	4

Fourth round
(United States) VG Hall	6	6	6
F Whitall	2	3	2

Preceded by 1893 Wimbledon Championships – Men's Singles	Grand Slam men's singles	Succeeded by 1894 Wimbledon Championships – Men's singles
