= Augusta Schultz =

American tennis player (1871–1925)

- Full name: Augusta Louise Schultz
- Country (sports): United States
- Born: July 28, 1871 Murray Hill, New Jersey
- Died: September 30, 1925 (aged 54) Asheville, North Carolina

Singles

Grand Slam singles results
- US Open: F (1893)

Doubles

Grand Slam doubles results
- US Open: F (1893)

Grand Slam mixed doubles results
- US Open: W (1905)

Augusta Louise Schultz Hobart (July 28, 1871 – September 30, 1925) was an American female tennis player who was active in the late 19th and early 20th centuries.

== Biography ==
Schultz was born in New Jersey and grew up in New York City, the daughter of German emigrants Carl Herman Schultz of Posen and his wife Louise Eissfeldt of Hamburg.

== Career ==
Schultz reached the All-Comers final of the 1893 women's singles U.S. National Championships at the Philadelphia Cricket Club, Chestnut Hill in which she lost to compatriot Aline Terry in two sets. This match decided the title as the reigning champion from Ireland Mabel Cahill did not defend her title in the Challenge Round. Later that same day she also lost the final of the women's doubles with her partner M Stone against Terry and Harriet Butler.

Schultz married tennis player Clarence Hobart in 1895. The couple won the U.S. National Championships mixed doubles title in 1905.

== Death ==
Schultz Hobart died of intestinal cancer at Mission Hospital in Asheville, North Carolina, age 54.

== Grand Slam finals ==
=== Singles (1 runner-up) ===
Result	Year	Championship	Surface	Opponent	Score
Loss	1893	U.S. Championships	Grass	(United States) Aline Terry	1–6, 3–6

=== Doubles (1 runner-up) ===
Result	Year	Championship	Surface	Partner	Opponents	Score
Loss	1893	U.S. Championships	Grass	(United States) M. Stone	(United States) Aline Terry (United States) Harriet Butler	4–6, 3–6

=== Mixed doubles (1 title) ===
Result	Year	Championship	Surface	Partner	Opponents	Score
Loss	1905	U.S. Championships	Grass	(United States) Clarence Hobart	(United States) Elisabeth Moore (Australia) Edward Dewhurst	6–2, 6–4
