= Aline Terry =

American tennis player

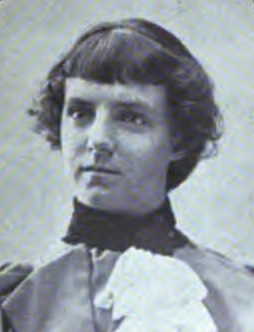
- Full name: Aline M. Terry
- Country (sports): United States
- Born: Princeton, New Jersey

Singles

Grand Slam singles results
- US Open: W (1893)

Doubles

Grand Slam doubles results
- US Open: W (1893)

Aline Terry was an American tennis player active at the end of the 19th century. She was born in Princeton, New Jersey.

Terry won both the singles and the doubles title in the 1893 U.S. National Championships (now called the US Open) In the singles she defeated Augusta Schultz in two sets of 6–1 and 6–3, and she played the doubles with Harriet Butler defeating Augusta Schultz and M. Stone in two sets of 6–4 and 6–3. In 1894, as the defending singles champion, she automatically qualified for the final round in singles under the challenge rule; however, she lost against Helen Hellwig 5–7, 6–3, 0–6, 6–3 and 3–6.

According to Bud Collins there is little more known about Aline Terry other than that she did not compete in the championship again after 1894. According to the multiple-time champion Juliette Atkinson, Terry was as "soft as a cat on a banana and ran after the balls like a tiger."

== Grand Slam finals ==
=== Singles (1 title) ===
Result	Year	Championship	Surface	Opponent	Score
Win	1893	U.S. Championships	Grass	(United States) Augusta Schultz	6–1, 6–3

=== Doubles (1 title) ===
Result	Year	Championship	Surface	Partner	Opponents	Score
Win	1893	U.S. Championships	Grass	(United States) Harriet Butler	(United States) Augusta Schultz (United States) M. Stone	6–4, 6–3
