= 1896 in tennis =

This page covers all the important events in the sport of tennis in 1896. It provides the results of notable tournaments throughout the year on both the men's and women's ILTF tennis circuits.

== Australian Open ==
No event.

== French Open ==
Not a Grand Slam event.

== Wimbledon ==
Category	Champion(s)	Finalist(s)	Score
Men's singles	(United Kingdom) Harold Mahony	(United Kingdom) Wilfred Baddeley	6–2, 6–8, 5–7, 8–6, 6–3
Women's singles	(United Kingdom) Charlotte Cooper	(United Kingdom) Alice Simpson Pickering	6–2, 6–3
Men's doubles	(United Kingdom) Herbert Baddeley (United Kingdom) Wilfred Baddeley	(United Kingdom) Reginald Doherty (United Kingdom) Harold Nisbet	1–6, 3–6, 6–4, 6–2, 6–1

== US Open ==
Category	Champion(s)	Finalist(s)	Score
Men's singles	(United States) Robert Wrenn	(United States) Fred Hovey	7–5, 3–6, 6–0, 1–6, 6–1
Women's singles	(United States) Elisabeth Moore	(United States) Juliette Atkinson	6–4, 4–6, 6–2, 6–2
Men's doubles	(United States) Carr Neel (United States) Sam Neel	(United States) Robert Wrenn (United States) Malcolm Chace	6–3, 1–6, 6–1, 3–6, 6–1
Women's doubles	(United States) Elisabeth Moore (United States) Juliette Atkinson	(United States) Annabella Wistar (United States) Amy Williams	6–3, 9–7
Mixed doubles	(United States) Juliette Atkinson (United States) Edwin P. Fischer	(United States) Amy Williams (United States) Mantle Fielding	6–2, 6–3, 6–3
