= List of male doubles tennis players =

Male Doubles Tennis Players

This is a list of top international male doubles tennis players, both past and present.

It includes players who have won a Grand Slam or Olympic doubles title; or have been officially ranked world no. 1 in doubles.

Players who have won more than one Grand Slam doubles title or have been ranked world no. 1 in doubles are in bold. Players who are still active on the tour are in italics.

== List ==
Name	Birth	Death	Nationality	HoF	Criteria for inclusion
David Adams	1970	–	South Africa		2 Grand Slam mixed doubles titles, both partnering Mariaan de Swardt → 1999 Australian Open champion • 2000 French Open champion • ranked world no. 9 in 1994
**Pieter Aldrich**	1965	–	South Africa		2 Grand Slam doubles titles, both partnering Danie Visser → 1990 Australian Open champion • 1990 US Open champion • ranked doubles world no. 1 for 19 weeks in 1990/1991
Fred Alexander	1880	1969	United States	1961	6 Grand Slam doubles titles → 1907, 1908, 1909, 1910 and 1917 US National Championships winner, partnering Harold Hackett for the first four and then Harold Throckmorton • 1908 Australasian Championships winner, partnering Alfred Dunlop
**John Alexander**	1951	–	Australia		2 Grand Slam doubles titles → 1975 Australian Open champion, partnering Phil Dent • 1982 Australian Open champion, partnering John Fitzgerald • ranked world no. 10 in 1976
Wilmer Allison	1904	1977	United States	1963	1 Grand Slam singles title → **1935 United States champion**, 1934 finalist • 1930 Wimbledon singles finalist • ranked amateur world no. 4 in 1932 and 1935
Victor Amaya	1954	–	United States		1 Grand Slam doubles title → 1980 French Open doubles champion, partnering Hank Pfister • ranked world no. 16 in 1983
Vijay Amritraj	1953	–	India	2024 (Note: Inducted into the 'contributor' category.)	1973 and 1981 Wimbledon quarterfinalist • 1973 and 1974 US Open quarterfinalist
**James Anderson**	1894	1973	Australia	2013	2 Grand Slam doubles titles → 1922 Wimbledon champion, partnering Randolph Lycett • 1925 Australasian champion, partnering **Norman Brookes**
**Mal Anderson**	1935	2026	Australia	2000	2 Grand Slam doubles titles and 1 Grand Slam mixed doubles title → 1957 French champion, partnering **Ashley Cooper** • 1973 Australian Open doubles champion, partnering **John Newcombe** • 1957 Australian Open mixed doubles champion, partnering Fay Muller
Paul Annacone	1963	–	United States		1 Grand Slam doubles title → 1985 Australian Open champion, partnering Christo van Rensburg • ranked world no. 3 in 1987
**Marcelo Arévalo**	1990	–	El Salvador		2 Grand Slam doubles titles and 1 Grand Slam mixed doubles title → 2022 French Open champion, partnering Jean-Julien Rojer • 2024 French Open champion, partnering Mate Pavić • 2026 Wimbledon mixed doubles champion, partnering Jeļena Ostapenko • ranked doubles world no. 1 for 40 weeks in 2024/2025
Jimmy Arias	1964	–	United States		1 Grand Slam mixed doubles title → 1981 French Open champion with Andrea Jaeger • ranked world no. 61 in 1987
**Arthur Ashe**	1943	1993	United States	1985	2 Grand Slam doubles titles → 1971 US Open champion with Marty Riessen • 1977[Jan] Australian Open champion, partnering Tony Roche • ranked world no. 14 in 1976
Simon Aspelin	1974	–	Sweden		1 Grand Slam doubles title → 2007 US Open champion, partnering Julian Knowle • ranked world no. 7 in 2008
John Austin	1957	–	United States		1 Grand Slam mixed doubles title → 1980 Wimbledon champion, partnering Tracy Austin • ranked world no. 52 in 1981
Luis Ayala	1932	2024	Chile		1 Grand Slam mixed doubles title → 1956 French Championships with Thelma Coyne Long.
Herbert Baddeley	1872	1931	(United Kingdom) Great Britain		4 Grand Slam doubles titles → 1891, 1894, 1895 and 1896 Wimbledon champion, partnering his twin **Wilfred Baddeley**
**Wilfred Baddeley**	1872	1929	(United Kingdom) Great Britain	2013	4 Grand Slam doubles → 1891, 1894, 1895 and 1896 Wimbledon champion, partnering his twin Herbert Baddeley
Jean-Claude Barclay	1942		France		3 mixed doubles titles, all partnering Françoise Dürr → 1968/1971/1973 French Open mixed doubles champion
Herbert Roper Barrett	1873	1943	(United Kingdom) Great Britain		3 Grand Slam doubles titles → 1909, 1912 and 1923 Wimbledon champion • 1908 Olympic gold medalist, partnering Arthur Gore
Pierre Barthès	1941	–	France		1 Grand Slam doubles title → 1970 French Open champion, partnering Nikola Pilić
Jeremy Bates	1962	–	(United Kingdom) Great Britain		2 Grand Slam mixed doubles titles, both partnering Jo Durie → 1987 Wimbledon champion • 1991 Australian Open champion • ranked world no. 25 in 1991
Boris Becker	1967	–	(West Germany) Germany	2003	1992 Olympic gold medalist, partnering Michael Stich • ranked world no. 6 in 1986
Julien Benneteau	1981	–	France		1 Grand Slam doubles title → 2014 French Open champion, partnering Édouard Roger-Vasselin • ranked world no. 5 in 2014
Lennart Bergelin	1925	2008	Sweden		1 Grand Slam doubles title → 1948 French champion, partnering Jaroslav Drobný
Marcel Bernard	1914	1994	France		2 Grand Slam doubles titles → 1936, 1946 French champion • 2 Grand Slam mixed doubles title → 1935, 1936 French champion
**Mahesh Bhupathi**	1974	–	India		4 Grand Slam doubles titles and 8 Grand Slam mixed doubles titles → 1999 and 2001 French Open champion, both partnering Leander Paes • 1999 Wimbledon champion, partnering Leander Paes • 2002 US Open champion, partnering Max Mirnyi • 1997 and 2012 French Open champion, partnering Rika Hiraki and Sania Mirza • 1999 and 2005 US Open champion, partnering Ai Sugiyama and Daniela Hantuchová • 2002 and 2005 Wimbledon champion, partnering Likhovtseva and Mary Pierce • 2006 and 2009 Australian Open, partnering **Martina Hingis** and Sania Mirza • ranked doubles world no. 1 for 4 weeks in 1999
**Jonas Björkman**	1972	–	Sweden		9 Grand Slam doubles titles → 1998, 1999 and 2001 Australian Open champion, partnering Jacco Eltingh, Patrick Rafter, Todd Woodbridge respectively • 2005 and 2006 French Open champion, both partnering Max Mirnyi • 2002, 2003 and 2004 Wimbledon champion, all partnering Todd Woodbridge • 2003 US champion, partnering Todd Woodbridge • ranked doubles world no. 1 for 74 weeks in 2001/2002/2004/2005
**Byron Black**	1969	–	Zimbabwe		1 Grand Slam doubles title → 1994 French Open champion, partnering Jonathan Stark • ranked doubles world no. 1 for 8 weeks in 1994
Wayne Black	1973	–	Zimbabwe		2 Grand Slam doubles titles, all partnering Kevin Ullyett and 2 Grand Slam mixed doubles titles, all partnering Cara Black → 2001 US Open champion • 2005 Australian Open champion • 2002 French Open mixed doubles champion • 2004 Wimbledon mixed doubles champion • ranked world no. 4 in 2005
John Boland	1870	1958	United Kingdom		1896 Olympic gold medalist, partnering Friedrich Traun
Simone Bolelli	1985	–	Italy		1 Grand Slam doubles title → 2015 Australian Open champion, partnering Fabio Fognini • ranked world no. 6 in 2025
**Rohan Bopanna**	1980	–	India		1 Grand Slam doubles title and 1 Grand Slam mixed doubles title → 2024 Australian Open champion, partnering Matthew Ebden • 2017 French Open mixed doubles champion, partnering Gabriela Dabrowski • ranked doubles world no. 1 for 8 weeks in 2024
**Jean Borotra**	1898	1994	France	1976	9 Grand Slam doubles titles → 1925, 1928, 1929, 1934 and 1936 French champion, partnering **René Lacoste**, Jacques Brugnon, Lacoste, Brugnon and Marcel Bernard respectively • 1925, 1932 and 1933 Wimbledon champion, Lacoste, Brugnon and Brugnon respectively • 1928 Australian champion, partnering Brugnon — 5 Grand Slam mixed doubles titles → 1925 Wimbledon champion, partnering **Suzanne Lenglen** • 1926 United States champion, partnering Elizabeth Ryan • 1927 and 1934 French champion, partnering Marguerite Brocquedis and Colette Rosambert respectively • 1928 Australian champion, partnering **Daphne Akhurst**
Christian Boussus	1908	2003	France		1 Grand Slam mixed doubles title → 1935 Australian champion, partnering Louie Bickerton
**John Bromwich**	1918	1999	Australia	1984	13 Grand Slam doubles titles → 1938, 1939, 1946, 1947, 1948, 1949 and 1950 Australian champion, all partnering **Adrian Quist** • 1939, 1949 and 1959 US National champion, partnering **Quist**, Bill Sidwell and **Frank Sedgman** respectively • 1948 and 1950 Wimbledon champion, partnering **Sedgman** and **Quist** respectively — 4 Grand Slam mixed doubles titles → 1938 Australian champion, partnering Margaret Wilson • 1947 and 1948 Wimbledon champion, partnering both partnering **Louise Brough** • 1948 US National champion, partnering **Brough**
**Norman Brookes**	1877	1968	Australia	1977	4 Grand Slam doubles titles → 1907 and 1914 Wimbledon champion, both partnering **Anthony Wilding** • 1919 United States champion, partnering **Gerald Patterson** • 1924 Australian champion, partnering **James Anderson**
Tom Brown	1922	2011	United States		1946 United States finalist • 1947 Wimbledon finalist, 1946 semifinalist, 1948 quarterfinalist
Jacques Brugnon	1895	1978	France	1976	Further information: Bryan brothers 10 Grand Slam doubles titles → 1926, 1928, 1932 and 1933 Wimbledon champion, partnering **Henri Cochet** for the first two and **Jean Borotra** for the latter two • 1927, 1928, 1930, 1932 and 1934 French champion, partnering **Cochet** for the first three and **Borotra** for the last two • 1928 Australian champion, partnering **Borotra** — 2 Grand Slam mixed doubles titles → 1925 and 1926 French champion, both partnering **Suzanne Lenglen**
**Bob Bryan**	1978	–	United States	2025	16 Grand Slam doubles titles, all partnering his twin Mike Bryan and 7 Grand Slam mixed doubles titles → 2003/2013 French Open champion • 2005/2008/2010/2012/2014 US Open champion • 2006/2007/2009/2010/2011/2013 Australian Open champion • 2006/2011/2013 Wimbledon champion • 2003, 2004, 2006 and 2010 US Open champion, partnering Katarina Srebotnik, Vera Zvonareva, Martina Navratilova and Liezel Huber • 2008 and 2009 French Open champion, partnering Victoria Azarenka and Liezel Huber • 2008 Wimbledon champion, partnering Samantha Stosur • ranked world no. 1 for 439 weeks in 2003/2004/2005/2006/2007/2008/2009/2010/2011/2012/2013/2014/2015 • 2012 Olympic gold medalist, partnering Mike.
**Mike Bryan**	1978	–	United States	2025	Further information: Bryan brothers 18 Grand Slam doubles titles, partnering his twin Bob Bryan and Jack Sock and 4 Grand Slam mixed doubles titles → 2003/2013 French Open champion • 2005/2008/2010/2012/2014/2018 US Open champion • 2006/2007/2009/2010/2011/2013 Australian Open champion • 2006/2011/2013/2018 Wimbledon champion• 2002 US Open champion, partnering Lisa Raymond • 2003 and 2015 French Open champion, partnering Lisa Raymond and Bethanie Mattek-Sands • 2012 Wimbledon champion partnering Lisa Raymond • ranked world no. 1 for 506 weeks in 2003/2004/2005/2006/2007/2008/2009/2010/2011/2012/2013/2014/2015/2018/2019 • 2012 Olympic gold medalist, partnering Bob.
**Don Budge**	1915	2000	United States	1964	6 Grand Slam singles titles → **1937 and 1938 Wimbledon champion**, 1935 and 1936 semifinalist • **1937 and 1938 United States champion**, 1936 finalist, 1935 quarterfinalist • **1938 French champion** • **1938 Australian champion** • **rated amateur world no. 1 for 4 years**, 1937 through 1940
**Juan Sebastián Cabal**	1986	–	Colombia		2 Grand Slam doubles titles, both partnering Robert Farah and 1 Grand Slam mixed doubles title → 2019 Wimbledon champion • 2019 US Open champion • 2017 Australian Open mixed doubles champion, partnering Abigail Spears • ranked doubles world no. 1 for 29 weeks in 2019/2020
**Oliver Campbell**	1871	1953	United States	1955	3 Grand Slam doubles titles → 1888, 1891 and 1892 United States champion, partnering Valentine G. Hall, Bob Huntington and Huntington again respectively
Shelby Cannon	1966		United States		1 Grand Slam mixed doubles title → 1989 US Open champion, partnering Robin White • ranked world no. 27 in 1993
Tomás Carbonell	1968	–	Spain		1 Grand Slam mixed doubles title → 2001 French Open mixed doubles champion, partnering Virginia Ruano Pascual • ranked world no. 22 in 1995
**Sergio Casal**	1962	–	Spain		2 Grand Slam doubles titles, both partnering Emilio Sánchez and 1 Grand Slam mixed doubles title → 1990 French Open champion • 1988 US Open champion • 1986 US Open mixed doubles champion, partnering Raffaella Reggi • ranked doubles world no. 3 in 1991
**Ross Case**	1951	–	Australia		2 Grand Slam doubles titles, both partnering Ross Case → 1974 Australian Open champion • 1977 Wimbledon champion • ranked world no. 15 in 1976
Julian Cash	1996	–	(United Kingdom) Great Britain		1 Grand Slam doubles title → 2025 Wimbledon champion, partnering Lloyd Glasspool • ranked world no. 2 in 2025
František Čermák	1976	–	Czech Republic		1 Grand Slam mixed doubles title → 2013 French Open mixed doubles champion, partnering Lucie Hradecká • ranked world no. 14 in 2010
Malcolm Chace	1875	1955	United States	1961	1 Grand Slam doubles title → 1894 United States champion, partnering **Robert Wrenn**
Clarence Clark	1859	1937	United States	1983	1 Grand Slam doubles title → 1881 US Champion, partnering Fred Taylor
Joseph S. Clark	1861	1956	United States	1955	1 Grand Slam doubles title ? 1885 US Champion, partnering Dick Sears
Arnaud Clément	1977	–	France		1 Grand Slam doubles title → 2007 Australian Open champion, partnering Michaël Llodra • ranked world no. 8 in 2008
**Henri Cochet**	1901	1987	France	1976	5 Grand Slam doubles titles, all partnering Jacques Brugnon → 1927, 1930 and 1932 French champion • 1926 and 1928 Wimbledon champion – 5 Grand Slam mixed doubles titles → 1922, 1923, 1928 and 1929 French Champions, partnering **Suzanne Lenglen** for the first two and Eileen Bennett Whittingstall for the latter two • 1927 United States champion, partnering Bennett Whittingstall
**Grant Connell**	1965	–	Canada		ranked doubles world no. 1 for 17 weeks in 1993/1994
**Jimmy Connors**	1952	–	United States	1998	2 Grand Slam doubles titles both partnering Ilie Năstase → 1973 Wimbledon champion • 1975 US Open champion • ranked world no. 7 in 1976
Elwood Cooke	1913	2004	United States		1 Grand Slam doubles title → 1939 Wimbledon champion, partnering **Bobby Riggs** — 1 Grand Slam mixed doubles title → 1939 United States champion, partnering **Sarah Palfrey Cooke**
**Ashley Cooper**	1936	2020	Australia	1991	4 Grand Slam doubles titles → 1957 and 1958 French champion, partnering Mal Anderson and **Neale Fraser** respectively • 1957 United States champion, partnering **Fraser** • 1958 Australian champion, partnering **Fraser**
**Gottfried von Cramm**	1909	1976	/ Germany	1977	2 Grand Slam singles titles → 1934/1936 **French champion**, 1935 finalist • 1935/1936/1937 Wimbledon finalist • 1937 US finalist
**Jack Crawford**	1908	1991	Australia	1979	6 Grand slam doubles titles → 1929, 1930, 1932 and 1935 Australian champion, the first two partnering Harry Hopman, the third with Edgar Moon, and the fourth with Vivian McGrath • 1935 French champion, partnering **Adrian Quist** • 1935 Wimbledon champion, partnering **Quist**
**Dick Crealy**	1944	–	Australia		2 Grand Slam doubles titles → 1968 Australian champion, partnering Allan Stone • 1974 French Open, partnering Onny Parun – 1 Grand Slam mixed doubles title → 1968 Australian champion, partnering **Billie Jean King**
Pablo Cuevas	1986	–	Uruguay		1 Grand Slam doubles title → 2008 French Open champion, partnering Luis Horna • ranked world no. 14 in 2009
Kevin Curren	1958	–	South Africa/United States		1 Grand Slam doubles title and 3 Grand Slam mixed doubles titles, all partnering Anne Smith → 1982 US Open champion, partnering Steve Denton • 1981/1982 US Open champion • 1982 Wimbledon champion • ranked world no. 3 in 1983
Martin Damm	1972	–	Czechoslovakia / Czech Republic		1 Grand Slam doubles title → 2006 US Open champion, partnering Leander Paes • ranked world no. 5 in 2007
**Owen Davidson**	1943	2023	Australia	2010	2 Grand Slam doubles titles and 11 mixed doubles titles → 1972 Australian Open champion, partnering Ken Rosewall • 1973 US Open champion, partnering John Newcombe • 1965/1967 Australian Open mixed doubles champion, partnering Robyn Ebbern and Lesley Turner Bowrey • 1966/1967/1971/1973 US Open mixed doubles champion, partnering Donna Floyd and Billie Jean King • 1967 French Open mixed doubles champion, partnering Billie Jean King • 1967/1971/1973/1974 Wimbledon champion mixed doubles champion, partnering Billie Jean King
Sven Davidson	1928	2008	Sweden	2007	1 Grand Slam doubles title → 1958 Wimbledon champion, partnering Ulf Schmidt
Dwight Davis	1879	1945	United States	1956	3 Grand Slam doubles titles → 1899, 1900 and 1901 United States champion, partnering Holcombe Ward
Scott Davis	1962	–	United States		1 Grand Slam doubles title → 1991 Australian Open, partnering David Pate • ranked world no. 2 in 1991
Max Decugis	1882	1978	France		1 Grand Slam doubles titles → 1911 Wimbledon doubles champion • 1906 Olympic gold medalist singles, doubles and mixed doubles • 1920 Olympic gold medalist mixed doubles
Phil Dent	1950	–	Australia		1 Grand Slam doubles title and 1 Grand Slam mixed doubles title → 1975 Australian Open champion, partnering John Alexander • 1976 US Open champion, partnering Billie Jean King • ranked world no. 9 in 1977
Steve Denton	1956	–	United States		1 Grand Slam doubles title → 1982 US Open champion, partnering Kevin Curren • ranked world no. 2 in 1983
Bernard Destremau	1917	2002	France		1 Grand Slam doubles title → 1938 French champion, partnering Yvon Petra
**Lukáš Dlouhý**	1983	–	Czech Republic		2 Grand Slam doubles titles, both partnering Leander Paes → 2009 US Open champion • 2025 Australian Open champion • ranked world no. 5 in 2009
Charles P. Dixon	1873	1939	(United Kingdom) Great Britain		3 Grand Slam doubles titles → 1912 Australian champion, 1912 and 1913 Wimbledon champion • 1912 Olympic gold medalist mixed doubles
**Ivan Dodig**	1985	–	Croatia		3 Grand Slam doubles titles and 4 Grand Slam mixed doubles titles → 2015 French Open, partnering Marcelo Melo • 2021 Australian Open champion, partnering Filip Polášek • 2023 French Open champion, partnering Austin Krajicek • 2018 French Open mixed doubles champion, partnering Latisha Chan • 2019 French Open mixed doubles champion, partnering Latisha Chan • 2019 Wimbledon mixed doubles champion, partnering Latisha Chan • 2022 Australian Open mixed doubles champion, partnering Kristina Mladenovic • ranked world no. 2 in 2023
John Doeg	1908	1978	United States	1962	2 doubles Grand Slam titles → 1929, 1930 United States champion, partnering George Lott
**Laurence Doherty**	1875	1919	(United Kingdom) Great Britain	1980	10 Grand Slam doubles titles and 1 Olympic doubles gold medal → 1897, 1898, 1899, 1900, 1901, 1903, 1904 and 1905 Wimbledon champion, all partnering **Reginald Doherty** • 1902 and 1903 United States champion, both partnering **Doherty** • 1900 Olympic gold medalist, partnering **Doherty**
**Reginald Doherty**	1872	1910	(United Kingdom) Great Britain	1980	10 Grand Slam doubles titles and 2 Olympic doubles gold medals → 1897, 1898, 1899, 1900, 1901, 1903, 1904 and 1905 Wimbledon champion, all partnering brother **Laurence Doherty** • 1902 and 1903 United States champion, both partnering Laurence • 1900 Olympic gold medalist, partnering Laurence • 1908 Olympic gold medalist, partnering George Hillyard
Scott Draper	1974	–	Australia		1 Grand Slam mixed doubles title → 2005 Australian Open champion, partnering Samantha Stosur • ranked world no. 132 in 1996
**Jaroslav Drobný**	1921	2001	// Czechoslovakia/Egypt	1983	1 Grand Slam doubles title → 1948 French champion, partnering Lennart Bergelin — 1 Grand Slam mixed doubles title → 1948 French champion, partnering Patricia Canning Todd
Cliff Drysdale	1941	–	South Africa	2013	1 Grand Slam doubles title → 1972 US Open champion, partnering Roger Taylor • ranked world no. 19 in 1976
**James Dwight**	1852	1917	United States	1955	5 Grand Slam doubles title → 1882–1884, 1886, 1887 **US Champion**
**Matthew Ebden**	1987	–	Australia		2 Grand Slam doubles titles and 1 Grand Slam mixed doubles title → 2022 Wimbledon champion, partnering Max Purcell • 2024 Australian Open champion, partnering Rohan Bopanna • 2013 Australian Open mixed doubles champion, partnering Jarmila Wolfe • ranked doubles world no. 1 for 9 weeks in 2024 • 2024 Olympic gold medalist, partnering John Peers
**Stefan Edberg**	1966	–	Sweden	2004	3 Grand Slam doubles titles → 1987/1996 Australian Open champion, partnering Anders Järryd and Petr Korda respectively • 1987 US Open champion, partnering Anders Järryd • ranked doubles world no. 1 for 15 weeks in 1986/1987
**Mark Edmondson**	1954	–	Australia		5 Grand Slam doubles titles → 1980/1981/1983/1984 Australian Open champion, partnering Kim Warwick for the first two, Paul McNamee, and Sherwood Stewart • 1985 French Open champion, partnering Kim Warwick • ranked world no. 3 in 1984
**Jacco Eltingh**	1970	–	Netherlands		6 Grand Slam doubles titles → 1994 and 1998 Australian Open champion, partnering Paul Haarhuis and Jonas Björkman • 1994 US Open champion, partnering Paul Haarhuis • 1995 and 1998 French Open champion, both partnering Paul Haarhuis • 1998 Wimbledon champion, partnering Paul Haarhuis • ranked doubles world no. 1 for 62 weeks in 1995/1998/1999
**Roy Emerson**	1936	–	Australia	1982	16 Grand Slam doubles titles → 1959, 1961 and 1971 Wimbledon champion, partnering **Neale Fraser** for the first two and Rod Laver for the third • 1959, 1960, 1965 and 1966 United States champion, partnering Fraser for the first two and Fred Stolle for the latter two • 1960, 1961, 1962, 1963, 1964 and 1965 French champion, partnering Fraser for the first two, then Laver, then Manolo Santana, then Ken Fletcher, and then with Stolle for the final one • 1962, 1966 and 1969 Australian (Open) champion, partnering Fraser, Stolle, and Laver respectively
Jonathan Erlich	1977	–	Israel		1 Grand Slam doubles title → 2008 Australian Open champion, partnering Andy Ram • ranked world no. 5 in 2008
Robert Falkenburg	1926	2022	United States	1974	2 Grand Slam doubles titles → 1944 United States doubles champion, partnering Don McNeill • 1947 Wimbledon doubles champion, partnering Jack Kramer
**Robert Farah**	1987	–	Colombia		2 Grand Slam doubles titles, both partnering Juan Sebastián Cabal → 2019 Wimbledon champion • 2019 US Open champion • ranked doubles world no. 1 for 68 weeks in 2019/2020/2021
Roger Federer	1981	–	Switzerland		2008 Olympic gold medalist, partnering Stan Wawrinka • ranked doubles world no. 24 in 2003
Ellis Ferreira	1970	–	South Africa		1 Grand Slam mixed doubles title and 1 Grand Slam mixed doubles title → 2000 Australian Open champion, partnering Rick Leach • 2011 US Open mixed doubles champion, partnering Corina Morariu • ranked world no. 2 in 2000
Wojciech Fibak	1952	–	Poland		1 Grand Slam doubles title → 1978 Australian Open champion, partnering Kim Warwick • ranked world no. 2 in 1979
**John Fitzgerald**	1960	–	Australia		7 Grand Slam doubles titles and 2 Grand Slam mixed doubles titles, both partnering Elizabeth Smylie → 1982 Australian Open champion, partnering John Alexander • 1984 and 1991 US Open champion, partnering Tomáš Šmíd and Anders Järryd • 1986 and 1991 French Open champion, partnering Tomáš Šmíd and Anders Järryd • 1989 and 1991 Wimbledon champion, both partnering Anders Järryd • 1983 US Open mixed doubles champion • 1991 Wimbledon mixed doubles champion • ranked doubles world no. 1 for 40 weeks in 1991/1992
**Ken Flach**	1963	–	United States		4 Grand Slam doubles titles → 1987/1988 Wimbledon champion, both partnering Robert Seguso and 2 Grand Slam mixed doubles titles, both partnering Kathy Jordan • 1985 and 1993 US Open champion, partnering Robert Seguso and Rick Leach • 1986 French Open mixed doubles champion • 1986 Wimbledon mixed doubles champion • ranked world no. 1 for 5 weeks in 1985/1986 • 1988 Olympic gold medalist, partnering Robert Seguso
**Peter Fleming**	1955	–	United States		7 Grand Slam doubles titles, all partnering John McEnroe → 1979/1981/1983/1984 Wimbledon champion • 1979/1981/1983 US Open champion • ranked world no. 1 for 17 weeks in 1982/1984
Fabio Fognini	1987	–	Italy		1 Grand Slam doubles title → 2015 Australian Open champion, partnering Simone Bolelli • ranked world no. 7 in 2015
Gordon Forbes	1934	2020	South Africa		1 Grand Slam mixed doubles title → 1955 United States champion, partnering Darlene Hard
Javier Frana	1966	–	Argentina		1 Grand Slam mixed doubles title → 1996 French Open champion, partnering Patricia Tarabini • ranked world no. 14 in 1992
**Neale Fraser**	1933	2024	Australia	1984	11 Grand Slam doubles titles → 1957, 1958 and 1962 Australian champion, partnering Lew Hoad, Ashley Cooper and **Roy Emerson** respectively • 1957, 1959 and 1960 United States champion, partnering Cooper and then **Emerson** twice • 1958, 1960 and 1962 French champion, partnering Cooper and then **Emerson** twice • 1959 and 1961 Wimbledon champion, both partnering **Emerson** – 5 mixed doubles Grand Slam titles → 1956 Australian champion, partnering Beryl Penrose Collier • 1958, 1959 and 1960 United States champion, all partnering Margaret Osborne duPont • 1962 Wimbledon champion, partnering Osborne duPont
Leoš Friedl	1977	–	Czech Republic		1 Grand Slam mixed doubles title → 2001 Wimbledon mixed doubles champion, partnering Daniela Hantuchová • ranked world no. 14 in 2005
Otto Froitzheim	1884	1962	Germany		1914 Wimbledon finalist • 1908 Olympic silver medalist
**Patrick Galbraith**	1967	–	United States		2 Grand Slam mixed doubles titles → 1994 US Open mixed doubles champion, partnering Elna Reinach • 1996 US Open mixed doubles champion, partnering Lisa Raymond • ranked doubles world no. 1 for 4 weeks in 1993/1994
Chuck Garland	1898	1971	United States	1969	1 Grand Slam doubles title → 1920 Wimbledon champion, partnering Richard Norris Williams
Richard Gasquet	1986	–	France		1 Grand Slam mixed doubles title → 2004 French Open mixed doubles champion, partnering Tatiana Golovin • ranked world no. 45 in 2008
Maurice Germot	1882	1958	France		1912 Olympic gold medalist, partnering André Gobert
Vitas Gerulaitis	1954	1994	United States		1 Grand Slam doubles title → 1975 Wimbledon champion, partnering Gene Mayer • ranked world no. 43 in 1985
Justin Gimelstob	1977	–	United States		2 Grand Slam mixed doubles titles, both partnering Venus Williams → 1998 Australian Open champion • 1998 French Open champion • ranked world no. 18 in 2000
Andrés Gimeno	1938	2019	Spain	2009	1 Grand Slam singles titles → 1972 **French champion** • ranked world no. 10 amateur in 1969
Juan Gisbert Sr.	1942	–	/ Spain		1968 Australian Championships finalist – 1975 Masters Grand Prix champion, partnering Manuel Orantes
**Lloyd Glasspool**	1993	–	(United Kingdom) Great Britain		1 Grand Slam doubles titles → 2025 Wimbledon champion, partnering Julian Cash • ranked doubles world no. 1 for 24 weeks in 2025/2026
André Gobert	1890	1951	France		1 Grand Slam doubles titles → 1911 Wimbledon doubles champion • 1912 Olympic gold medalist singles, doubles
**Andrés Gómez**	1960	–	Ecuador		2 Grand Slam doubles titles → 1986 US Open champion, partnering Slobodan Živojinović • 1988 French Open champion, partnering Emilio Sánchez • ranked doubles world no. 1 for 13 weeks in 1986/1987
**Pancho Gonzales**	1928	1995	United States	1968	2 Grand Slam singles titles → **1948 and 1949 United States champion** • 1968 French Open semifinalist • 1968 US Open quarterfinalist • **rated world no. 1 for 8 years**, 1952, 1954, 1955, 1956, 1957, 1958, 1959 and (as co-no.1) 1960
Fernando González	1980	–	Chile		1 Olympic doubles gold medal → 2004 gold medalist, partnering Nicolás Massú
Arthur Gore	1868	1928	(United Kingdom) Great Britain	2006	1 Grand Slam doubles titles → 1909 • 1908 Olympic singles gold medallist • 1908 Olympic doubles gold medallist
Spencer Gore	1850	1906	(United Kingdom) Great Britain		1 Grand Slam singles title → **1877 Wimbledon champion**, 1878 finalist
**Brian Gottfried**	1952	–	United States		3 Grand Slam doubles titles, all partnering Raúl Ramírez → 1975/1977 French Open champion • 1976 Wimbledon champion • ranked doubles world no. 2 in 1976
**Jim Grabb**	1964	–	United States		2 Grand Slam doubles titles → 1989 French Open doubles champion, partnering Patrick McEnroe • 1992 US Open doubles champion, partnering Richey Reneberg • ranked doubles world no. 1 for 4 weeks in 1989/1992/1993
Clark Graebner	1943	–	United States		1 doubles Grand Slam title → 1966 French champion, partnering Dennis Ralston
**Marcel Granollers**	1986	–	Spain		3 Grand Slam doubles titles → 2025/2026 French Open champion, partnering Horacio Zeballos • 2025 US Open champion, partnering Horacio Zeballos • ranked doubles world no. 1 for 22 weeks in 2024
**Clarence Griffin**	1888	1973	United States	1970	3 Grand Slam doubles titles → 1915/1916/1920 US Champion, all partnering Bill Johnston
Tom Gullikson	1951	–	United States		1 Grand Slam mixed doubles title → 1984 US Open champion, partnering Manuela Maleeva • ranked doubles world no. 4 in 1983
**Heinz Günthardt**	1959	–	Switzerland		2 Grand Slam doubles titles, both partnering Balázs Taróczy and 2 Grand Slam mixed doubles titles, both partnering Martina Navratilova → 1981 French Open champion • 1985 Wimbledon champion • 1985 French Open mixed doubles champion • 1985 US Open mixed doubles champion • ranked world no. 3 in 1985
**Paul Haarhuis**	1966	–	Netherlands		6 Grand Slam doubles titles → 1994 Australian Open champion, partnering Jacco Eltingh • 1994 US Open champion, partnering Jacco Eltingh • 1995, 1998 and 2002 French Open champion, partnering Jacco Eltingh and Yevgeny Kafelnikov • 1998 Wimbledon champion, partnering Jacco Eltingh • ranked doubles world no. 1 for 70 weeks in 1994/1995/1999
Harold Hackett	1878	1937	United States	1961	1906 United States quarterfinalist – 4 Grand Slam doubles titles → 1907, 1908, 1909 and 1910 United States champion, partnering Fred Alexander
Valentine Hall	1867	1934	United States		1891 US Championships singles semifinalist • 2 Grand Slam doubles titles → 1888, 1890 US champion, partnering Oliver Campbell and Clarence Hobart
Willoughby Hamilton	1864	1943	Ireland		1 Grand Slam singles title → **1890 Wimbledon champion**, 1889 semifinalist • **rated co-world no. 1 for 2 years**, 1889 and 1890
**Christian Harrison**	1994	–	United States		2 Grand Slam doubles title, both partnering Neal Skupski → 2026 Australian Open champion • 2026 US Open champion • ranked world no. 3 in 2026
Ryan Harrison	1992	–	United States		1 Grand Slam doubles title → 2017 French Open champion, partnering Michael Venus • ranked doubles world no. 16 in 2017
**John Hartley**	1849	1935	(United Kingdom) Great Britain		2 Grand Slam singles title → **1879 and 1880 Wimbledon champion**, 1881 runner-up • **rated world no. 1 for 2 years**, 1879 and 1880
John Hawkes	1899	1990	Australia		3 Grand Slam doubles titles → 1922, 1926, 1927 Australasian champion, partnering Gerald Patterson • 5 Grand Slam doubles titles → 1922, 1926, 1927 Australasian champion, partnering Esna Boyd, 1923, 1928 US champion, partnering Helen Wills
**Harri Heliövaara**	1989	–	Finland		3 Grand Slam doubles titles and 1 Grand Slam mixed doubles title → 2024/2026 Wimbledon champion, both partnering Henry Patten • 2025 Australian Open champion, partnering Henry Patten • 2023 US Open mixed doubles champion, partnering Anna Danilina • ranked doubles world no. 1 for 24 weeks in 2026
Henner Henkel	1915	1943	/ Germany		2 Grand Slam doubles titles → 1937 French champions, 1937 US champion, partnering Gottfried von Cramm
John Hennessey	1900	1981	United States		1 Grand Slam doubles title → 1928 US champion, partnering George Lott
**Pierre-Hugues Herbert**	1991	–	France		5 Grand Slam doubles titles all partnering Nicolas Mahut → 2015 US Open champion, 2016 Wimbledon champion, 2018/2021 French Open champion, 2019 Australian Open champion • ranked doubles world no. 2 in 2016
**Bob Hewitt**	1940	–	Australia/ South Africa		9 Grand Slam doubles titles and 6 Grand Slam mixed doubles titles → 1962/1964/1967/1972/1978 Wimbledon champion, partnering Fred Stolle and Frew McMillan • 1963/1964 Australian champion, partnering Fred Stolle • 1972 French Open champion, partnering Frew McMillan • 1977 US Open champion, partnering Frew McMillan • 1961 Australian champion, partnering Jan Lehane • 1970 and 1979 French Open champion, partnering Billie Jean King and Wendy Turnbull • 1977 and 1979 Wimbledon champion, both partnering Greer Stevens • 1979 US Open champion, partnering Greer Stevens • ranked doubles world no. 1 for 6 weeks in 1976
Lleyton Hewitt	1981	–	Australia	2021	1 Grand Slam doubles title → 2000 US Open champion, partnering Max Mirnyi • ranked doubles world no. 18 in 2000
Rinky Hijikata	2001	–	Australia		1 Grand Slam doubles title → 2023 Australian Open champion, partnering Jason Kubler • ranked world no. 23 in 2023
George Hillyard	1864	1943	(United Kingdom) Great Britain		1908 Olympic gold medalist, partnering Reginald Doherty
Jakob Hlasek	1964	–	Switzerland		1 Grand Slam doubles title → 1992 French Open champion, partnering Marc Rosset • ranked world no. 4 in 1989
**Lew Hoad**	1934	1994	Australia	1980	8 Grand Slam doubles titles → 1953, 1956 and 1957 Wimbledon champion, partnering **Ken Rosewall**, Rex Hartwig, and **Rosewall** respectively • 1953 and 1956 Australian champion, partnering **Rosewell** for the first two and then **Neale Fraser** • 1953 French champion, partnering **Rosewell** • 1956 United States champion, partnering **Rosewell** – 1 Grand Slam mixed doubles title → 1954 French champion, partnering **Maureen Connolly**
Clarence Hobart	1870	1930	United States		1891, 1905 US Championships singles finalist • 1898 Wimbledon singles semifinalist • 3 Grand Slam doubles titles → 1890, 1893, 1894 US champion, partnering Valentine Hall and Fred Hovey • 3 Grand Slam mixed doubles titles → 1892, 1893, 1905 US champion
Ronald Holmberg	1938	–	United States		1959 US Championships singles semifinalist • 1961 French Championships singles quarterfinalist • ranked world no. 7 in 1960
Harry Hopman	1906	1985	Australia	1978	2 Grand slam doubles titles → 1929, 1930 Australian champion, partnering Jack Crawford – 5 Grand Slam mixed doubles title → 1930, 1936, 1937 and 1938 Australian champion, partnering Nell Hall Hopman – United States champion, partnering **Alice Marble**.
Luis Horna	1980	–	Peru		Ranked world no. 16 in 2008 – 1 Grand Slam doubles title → 2008 French Open champion, partnering Pablo Cuevas
Fred Hovey	1868	1945	United States	1974	**1895 United States champion**, 1896 finalist (results likely incomplete as drawsheets for other years unavailable)
Pat Hughes	1902	1997	(United Kingdom) Great Britain		3 Grand Slam doubles titles → 1933 French champion and 1934 Australian champion, partnering Fred Perry and 1936 Wimbledon champion, partnering Raymond Tuckey.
Frank Hunter	1894	1981	United States	1961	3 Grand Slam doubles titles → 1924/1927 Wimbledon champion, partnering Vincent Richards and Bill Tilden • 1927 US champion, partnering Tilden • 1924 Olympic gold medalist, partnering Richards
**Bob Huntington**	1869	1949	United States		2 Grand Slam doubles titles → 1891/1892 US Champion, both partnering Oliver Campbell
Stephen Huss	1975	–	Australia		1 Grand Slam doubles title → 2005 Wimbledon champion, partnering Wesley Moodie • ranked world no. 21 in 2006
**Anders Järryd**	1961	–	Sweden		8 Grand Slam doubles titles → 1983/1987/1991 French Open champion, partnering Hans Simonsson, Robert Seguso and John Fitzgerald • 1987 and 1991 US Open champion, partnering Stefan Edberg and John Fitzgerald • 1989 and 1991 Wimbledon champion, both partnering John Fitzgerald • 1987 Australian Open champion, partnering **Edberg** • ranked doubles world no. 1 for 107 weeks in 1985/1986/1987/1988/1989/1990/1992
Luke Jensen	1966	–	United States		1 Grand Slam doubles title → 1993 French Open, partnering Murphy Jensen • ranked world no. 6 in 1993
Murphy Jensen	1968	–	United States		1 Grand Slam doubles title → 1993 French Open, partnering Luke Jensen • ranked world no. 17 in 1993
**Donald Johnson**	1968	–	United States		1 Grand Slam doubles title and 1 Grand Slam mixed doubles title → 2001 Wimbledon champion, partnering Jared Palmer • 2000 Wimbledon mixed doubles champion, partnering Kimberly Po • ranked doubles world no. 1 for 20 weeks in 2002
**Bill Johnston**	1894	1946	United States	1958	3 Grand Slam doubles titles → 1915, 1916 and 1920 United States champion, partnering Clarence Griffin – 1 Grand Slam mixed doubles title → 1921 United States champion, partnering **Mary Browne**
**Kelly Jones**	1964	–	United States		Ranked doubles world no. 1 for 1 week in 1992
**Yevgeny Kafelnikov**	1974	–	Russia	2019	4 Grand Slam doubles titles → 1996, 1997 and 2002 French Open champion, partnering Daniel Vacek for the first two and Paul Haarhuis for the third • 1997 US Open champion, partnering Daniel Vacek • ranked world no. 4 in 1998
Howard Kinsey	1899	1966	United States		2 Grand Slam doubles titles → 1924 French champion, 1926 US champion • 1926 Wimbledon mixed doubles finalist
Harold Kitson	1874	1951	South Africa		1912 Olympic gold medalist, partnering Charles Winslow
Billy Knight	1935	2026	(United Kingdom) Great Britain		1 Grand Slam mixed doubles title → 1959 French champion, partnering Yola Ramírez
Julian Knowle	1974	–	Austria		1 Grand Slam doubles title → 2007 US Open champion, partnering Simon Aspelin • ranked world no. 6 in 2008
**Mark Knowles**	1971	–	(The Bahamas) Bahamas		3 Grand Slam doubles titles, all partnering Daniel Nestor and 1 Grand Slam mixed doubles title → 2002 Australian Open champion • 2004 US Open champion • 2007 French Open champion • 2009 Wimbledon champion, partnering Anna-Lena Grönefeld • ranked world no. 1 for 65 weeks in 2002/2003/2004/2005
Thomaz Koch	1945	–	Brazil		1 Grand Slam mixed doubles title → 1975 French Open champion, partnering Fiorella Bonicelli • ranked world no. 60 in 1983
Thanasi Kokkinakis	1996	–	Australia		1 Grand Slam doubles title → 2022 Australian Open champion, partnering Nick Kyrgios • ranked world no. 15 in 2022
**Henri Kontinen**	1990	–	Finland		1 Grand Slam doubles title and 1 Grand Slam mixed doubles title → 2017 Australian Open champion, partnering John Peers • 2016 Wimbledon mixed doubles champion, partnering Heather Watson • ranked doubles world no. 1 for 26 weeks in 2017 • 2024 Olympic gold medalist, partnering Matthew Ebden
**Wesley Koolhof**	1989	–	Netherlands		1 Grand Slam doubles title and 1 Grand Slam mixed doubles title → 2023 Wimbledon champion, partnering Neal Skupski • 2022 French Open mixed doubles champion, partnering Ena Shibahara • ranked doubles world no. 1 for 34 weeks in 2022/2023
Petr Korda	1968	–	Czechoslovakia / Czech Republic		1 Grand Slam doubles title → 1996 Australian Open champion, partnering Stefan Edberg • ranked world no. 10 in 1990
**Austin Krajicek**	1990	–	United States		1 Grand Slam doubles title → 2023 French Open champion, partnering Ivan Dodig • ranked doubles world no. 1 for 26 weeks in 2023/2024
**Jack Kramer**	1921	2009	United States	1968	6 Grand Slam doubles titles → 1940, 1941, 1943, 1947 United States champion, all partnering **Ted Schroeder** • 1946 and 1947 Wimbledon champion, both partnering **Schroeder** — 1 Grand Slam mixed doubles title → 1941 United States champion, partnering **Sarah Palfrey Cooke**
**Kevin Krawietz**	1992	–	Germany		2 Grand Slam doubles titles → 2019/2020 French Open champion, both partnering Andreas Mies • ranked world no. 5 in 2025
Oscar Kreuzer	1887	1968	Germany		1913 Wimbledon semifinalist • 1912 Olympic singles bronze medalist
Jason Kubler	1993	–	Australia		1 Grand Slam doubles title → 2023 Australian Open champion, partnering Rinky Hijikata • ranked world no. 27 in 2023
**Łukasz Kubot**	1982	–	Poland		2 Grand Slam doubles titles → 2014 Australian Open champion, partnering Robert Lindstedt • 2017 Wimbledon champion, partnering Marcelo Melo • ranked doubles world no. 1 for 19 weeks in 2018
Nick Kyrgios	1995	–	Australia		1 Grand Slam doubles title → 2022 Australian Open champion, partnering Thanasi Kokkinakis • ranked world no. 11 in 2022
**René Lacoste**	1904	1996	France	1976	7 Grand Slam singles titles → **1925, 1927 and 1929 French champion**, 1926 and 1928 finalist • **1925 and 1928 Wimbledon champion**, 1924 finalist, 1927 semifinalist • **1926 and 1927 United States champion** • **rated world no. 1 for 2 years** — 3 Grand Slam doubles titles → 1925 and 1929 French champion, both partnering **Jean Borotra** • 1925 Wimbledon champion, partnering **Borotra**
Sébastien Lareau	1973	–	Canada		1 Grand Slam doubles title and 1 Olympic doubles gold medal → 1999 US Open doubles champion, partnering Alex O’Brien • 2000 Olympic doubles gold medalist, partnering Daniel Nestor • 1999 Tennis Masters Cup champion, partnering Alex O’Brien • ranked world no. 4 in 1999
**William Larned**	1872	1926	United States	1956	7 Grand Slam singles titles → **1901, 1902, 1907, 1908, 1909, 1910 and 1911 United States champion**, 1900 and 1903 finalist • **rated world no. 1 for 5 years** → 1901 and 1902 (co-rated), 1908, 1909 and 1910
**Rod Laver**	1938	–	Australia	1981	6 Grand Slam doubles titles → 1959, 1960 and 1961 Australian champion, partnering Bob Mark; 1969 Australian Open champion, partnering **Roy Emerson** • 1961 French champion, partnering **Emerson** • 1971 Wimbledon champion, partnering **Emerson** – 3 mixed doubles Grand Slam titles → 1959 and 1960 Wimbledon champion, partnering **Darlene Hard** • 1961 French champion, partnering **Hard**
Herbert Lawford	1851	1925	(United Kingdom) Great Britain	2006	1 Grand Slam singles title → **1887 Wimbledon champion**, 1880, 1884, 1885, 1886 and 1888 finalist, 1878, 1881 and 1882 and All-Comers semifinalist
**Rick Leach**	1964	–	United States		5 Grand Slam doubles titles and 4 Grand Slam mixed doubles titles → 1988/1989/2000 Australian Open champion, partnering Jim Pugh and Ellis Ferreira • 1990 Wimbledon champion, partnering Jim Pugh • 1993 US Open champion, partnering Ken Flach • 1995/1997 Australian Open mixed doubles champion, partnering Natasha Zvereva and Manon Bollegraf • 1990 Wimbledon champion, partnering Zina Garrison • 1997 US Open champion, partnering Manon Bollegraf • ranked doubles world no. 1 for 9 weeks in 1990
Henri Leconte	1963	–	France		1 Grand Slam doubles title → 1984 French Open champion, partnering Yannick Noah • ranked world no. 6 in 1985
Edgar Leonard	1881	1948	United States		1904 Olympic gold medalist, partnering Beals Wright
Ernest Lewis	1867	1930	(United Kingdom) Great Britain		1886, 1888, 1892, 1894 Wimbledon finalist
Robert Lindstedt	1977	–	Sweden		1 Grand Slam doubles title → 2014 Australian Open doubles champion, partnering Łukasz Kubot • ranked world no. 3 in 2013
Scott Lipsky	1981	–	United States		1 Grand Slam mixed doubles title → 2011 French Open mixed doubles champion, partnering Casey Dellacqua • ranked world no. 21 in 2013
**Michaël Llodra**	1980	–	France		3 Grand Slam doubles titles → 2003 and 2004 Australian Open champion, both partnering Fabrice Santoro • 2007 Wimbledon champion, partnering Arnaud Clément • ranked world no. 3 in 2011
John Lloyd	1954	–	(United Kingdom) Great Britain		3 mixed doubles Grand Slam titles, all partnering Wendy Turnbull → 1983 and 1984 Wimbledon champion • 1982 French Open champion • ranked world no. 34 in 1986
Marc López	1982	–	Spain		1 Grand Slam doubles title → 2016 French Open champion, partnering Feliciano López • ranked doubles world no. 3 in 2013 • 2016 Olympic gold medalist, partnering Rafael Nadal
George Lott	1906	1991	United States	1964	8 doubles Grand Slam titles → 1928, 1929, 1930, 1933 and 1934 United States champion, partnering John Hennessey, John Doeg, Doeg again, Lester Stoefen and Stoefen again, respectively • 1931 and 1934 Wimbledon champion, partnering John Van Ryn and Stoefen respectively • 1931 French champion, partnering Van Ryn – 4 mixed doubles Grand Slam titles → 1929, 1931 and 1934 United States champion, partnering Betty Nuthall, Nuthall again, and **Helen Jacobs**, respectively • 1931 Wimbledon champion, partnering Anna McCune Harper
Jorge Lozano	1963		Mexico		2 Grand Slam mixed doubles titles → 1988 French Open champion, partnering Lori McNeil • 1990 French Open champion, partnering Arantxa Sánchez Vicario • ranked world no. 4 in 1988
Matt Lucena	1969	–	United States		1 Grand Slam mixed doubles title → 1995 US Open champion, partnering Meredith McGrath • ranked world no. 62 in 1996
**Bob Lutz**	1949	–	United States		5 doubles Grand Slam titles, all partnering Stan Smith → 1968/1974/1978/1980 US Open champion • 1970 Australian Open champion • ranked world no. 6 in 1977
Randolph Lycett	1886	1935	(United Kingdom) Great Britain		5 Grand Slam doubles titles → 1905, 1911 Australian champion, 1921, 1922, 1923 Wimbledon champion • 3 Grand Slam mixed doubles titles → 1919, 1921, 1923 Wimbledon champion
George Lyttleton Rogers	1906	1963	(United Kingdom) Great Britain		1930, 1932 French Championships quarterfinalist
Tomáš Macháč	2000	–	Czech Republic		2024 mixed Olympic gold medalist, partnering Kateřina Siniaková • ranked doubles world no. 46 in 2024
Barry MacKay	1935	2012	United States		1959 Wimbledon semifinalist, 1958 and 1960 quarterfinalist • 1959 Australian semifinalist • 1959 United States quarterfinalist
Harold Mahony	1867	1905	(United Kingdom) Great Britain		1 Grand Slam singles title → **1896 Wimbledon champion** • 1900 Olympics singles and doubles silver medalist
**Nicolas Mahut**	1982	–	France		5 Grand Slam doubles titles all partnering Pierre-Hugues Herbert → 2015 US Open champion, 2016 Wimbledon champion, 2018/2021 French Open champion, 2019 Australian Open champion • ranked doubles world no. 1 for 39 weeks in 2016/2017
Gene Mako	1916	2013	United States	1973	4 Grand Slam doubles titles → 1936 and 1938 United States champion, both partnering **Don Budge** • 1937 and 1938 Wimbledon champion, partnering **Budge** – 1 Grand Slam mixed doubles title → 1936 US mixed doubles champion, partnering **Alice Marble**
Xavier Malisse	1980	–	Belgium		1 Grand Slam doubles title → 2004 French Open champion, partnering Olivier Rochus
Oliver Marach	1980	–	Austria		1 Grand Slam doubles title → 2018 Australian Open champion, partnering Mate Pavić • ranked world no. 2 in 2018
Jonathan Marray	1981	–	(United Kingdom) Great Britain		1 Grand Slam doubles title → 2012 Wimbledon champion, partnering Frederik Nielsen • ranked world no. 15 in 2013
Billy Martin	1956	–	United States		1 Grand Slam mixed doubles title → 1980 US Open champion, partnering Anne Smith • ranked world no. 52 in 1978
Nicolás Massú	1979	–	Chile		1 Olympic doubles gold medal → 2004 gold medalist, partnering Fernando González
**Geoff Masters**	1950	–	Australia		2 Grand Slam doubles titles, both partnering Ross Case and 1 Grand Slam mixed doubles title → 1974 Australian Open champion• 1977 Wimbledon champion • 1974 US Open champion, partnering Pam Teeguarden • ranked world no. 13 in 1976
Rafael Matos	1996	–	Brazil		1 Grand Slam mixed doubles title → 2023 Australian Open champion, partnering Luisa Stefani • ranked world no. 26 in 2023
Theodore Mavrogordato	1883	1941	(United Kingdom) Great Britain		1909, 1914, 1920 Wimbledon singles semifinalist • 1914 Wimbledon doubles finalist
**Gene Mayer**	1956	–	United States		2 Grand Slam doubles titles → 1978 French Open champion, partnering Hank Pfister • 1979 French Open champion, partnering Sandy Mayer • ranked world no. 5 in 1979
**Sandy Mayer**	1952	–	United States		2 Grand Slam doubles titles → 1975 Wimbledon champion, partnering Vitas Gerulaitis • 1979 French Open champion, partnering Gene Mayer • ranked world no. 3 in 1985
**John McEnroe**	1959	–	United States	1999	9 Grand Slam doubles titles and 1 mixed Grand Slam doubles title → 1979/1981/1983/1984/1992 Wimbledon doubles champion, partnering Peter Fleming and Michael Stich • 1979, 1981, 1983 and 1989 US Open doubles champion, partnering Peter Fleming and Mark Woodforde • 1977 French Open mixed doubles champion, partnering Mary Carillo • ranked doubles world no. 1 for 269 weeks in 1979/1980/1981/1982/1983/1984/1989
Patrick McEnroe	1966	–	United States		1 Grand Slam doubles title → 1989 French Open champion, partnering Jim Grabb • ranked doubles world no. 3 in 1993
Vivian McGrath	1916	1978	Australia		1 Grand Slam title → **1927 Australian champion** • 1 Grand Slam doubles title → 1935 Australian champion, partnering John Bromwich • 1933, 1934, 1935 French Championship doubles finalist
Ken McGregor	1929	2007	Australia	1999	1 Grand Slam title → **1952 Australian champion**, 1950 and 1951 finalist • 1951 Wimbledon finalist, 1952 quarterfinalist – 7 Grand Slam doubles titles, all partnering **Frank Sedgman** → 1951 and 1952 French champion • 1951 and 1952 Wimbledon champion • 1951 and 1952 Australian champion • 1951 United States champion – 1 Grand Slam mixed doubles champion → 1950 United States champion, partnering **Margaret Osborne duPont**
Chuck McKinley	1941	1986	United States	1986	1 Grand Slam doubles title → **1963 Wimbledon champion**, 1961 finalist, 1964 semifinalist • 1962, 1963 and 1964 United States semifinalist, 1960 quarterfinalist – 3 Grand Slam doubles titles → 1961, 1963 and 1964 United States champion, all partnering Dennis Ralston
**Maurice McLoughlin**	1890	1957	United States	1957	3 Grand Slam doubles titles → 1912, 1913 and 1914 United States champion, all partnering Tom Bundy
**Frew McMillan**	1942	–	South Africa	1992	5 Grand Slam doubles titles, all partnering Bob Hewitt and 5 Grand Slam mixed doubles titles → 1972 French Open champion • 1967/1972/1978 Wimbledon champion • 1977 US Open champion • 1966 French Open champion, partnering Annette Van Zyl • 1978/1981 Wimbledon champion, both partnering Betty Stöve • 1977/1978 US Open champion, partnering Betty Stöve • ranked doubles world no. 1 for 85 weeks in 1977/1978/1979
**Peter McNamara**	1955	2019	Australia		3 Grand Slam doubles titles → 1980, 1982 Wimbledon champion, partnering Paul McNamee • 1979 Australian Open champion, partnering McNamee
**Paul McNamee**	1954	–	Australia		4 Grand Slam doubles titles and 1 Grand Slam mixed doubles title → 1980/1982 Wimbledon champion, both partnering Peter McNamara • 1979/1983 Australian Open champion, partnering Peter McNamara and Mark Edmondson• 1985 Wimbledon mixed doubles champion, partnering Martina Navratilova • ranked doubles world no. 1 for 3 weeks in 1981
Fred McNair	1950	–	United States		1 Grand Slam doubles title → 1976 French Open champion, partnering Sherwood Stewart • ranked world no. 3 in 1976
Don McNeill	1918	1996	United States	1965	2 Grand Slam singles titles → **1939 French champion, 1940 United States champion** • 2 Grand Slam doubles titles → 1939 French champion, 1944 United States champion
Ernest George Meers	1848	1928	(United Kingdom) Great Britain		1889 US Championships singles semifinalist • 1895 Wimbledon singles semifinalist • 1888 Wimbledon doubles all-comers finalist, partnering A.G. Ziffo
Karl Meiler	1949	2014	West Germany		Ranked world no. 20 in 1973
**Nikola Mektić**	1988	–	Croatia		1 Grand Slam doubles title and 1 Grand Slam mixed doubles title → 2021 Wimbledon champion, partnering Mate Pavić • 2020 Australian Open mixed doubles champion, partnering Barbora Krejčíková • ranked doubles world no. 1 for 3 weeks in 2021 • 2020 Olympic gold medalist, partnering Pavić
**Marcelo Melo**	1983	–	Brazil		2 Grand Slam doubles titles → 2015 French Open champion, partnering Ivan Dodig • 2017 Wimbledon champion, partnering Łukasz Kubot • ranked doubles world no. 1 for 56 weeks in 2015/2016/2017/2018
**Jürgen Melzer**	1981	–	Austria		2 Grand Slam doubles titles, both partnering Philipp Petzschner and 1 Grand Slam mixed doubles title → 2010 Wimbledon champion • 2011 US Open champion • 2011 Wimbledon mixed doubles champion, partnering Iveta Benešová • ranked world no. 6 in 2010
Jakub Menšík	2005	–	Czech Republic		1 Grand Slam mixed doubles title → 2025 US Open mixed doubles champion, partnering Karolína Muchová • ranked doubles world no. 271 in 2025
Roderich Menzel	1907	1987	Czechoslovakia		1938 French Championships singles finalist • 1935 US Championships mixed doubles finalist, partnering Kay Stammers
**Andreas Mies**	1990	–	Germany		2 Grand Slam doubles titles → 2019/2020 French Open champion, both partnering Kevin Krawietz • ranked world no. 8 in 2019
**Max Mirnyi**	1977	–	Belarus		6 Grand Slam doubles titles and 4 Grand Slam mixed doubles titles → 2000/2002 US Open champion (the first with Lleyton Hewitt, the second with Mahesh Bhupathi) • 2005/2006/2011/2012 French Open champion (two with Jonas Björkman, two with Daniel Nestor) • 1998 Wimbledon mixed doubles champion, partnering Serena Williams • 1998 US Open mixed doubles champion, partnering Serena Williams • 2007 US Open mixed doubles champion, partnering Victoria Azarenka • 2013 US Open mixed doubles champion, partnering Andrea Sestini Hlaváčková • ranked doubles world no. 1 for 57 weeks • 2012 mixed Olympic gold medalist, partnering Victoria Azarenka
Dragutin Mitić	1917	1986	(Socialist Federal Republic of Yugoslavia) Yugoslavia		1 Grand Slam mixed doubles titles → 1938 French champion, partnering Simonne Mathieu
Iván Molina	1946	–	Colombia		1 Grand Slam mixed doubles title → 1974 US Open champion, partnering Martina Navratilova • ranked world no. 83 in 1979
Wesley Moodie	1979	–	South Africa		1 Grand Slam doubles title → 2005 Wimbledon champion with Stephe Huss • ranked world no. 8 in 2009
Edgar Moon	1904	1976	Australia		1 Grand Slam doubles titles → 1932 Australian champion with Jack Crawford — 2 Grand Slam mixed doubles title → 1929, 1934 Australian champion
Enrique Morea	1920	2006	Argentina		1 Grand Slam mixed doubles title → 1950 French champion
Gardnar Mulloy	1913	2016	United States	1972	4 Grand Slam doubles titles → 1942/1945/1946/1948 US champion, partnering Bill Talbert
**Jamie Murray**	1983	–	(United Kingdom) Great Britain		2 Grand Slam doubles titles, both partnering Bruno Soares and 5 Grand Slam mixed doubles titles → 2016 Australian Open champion • 2016 US Open champion • 2007 Wimbledon mixed doubles champion, partnering Jelena Janković • 2017 Wimbledon mixed doubles champion, partnering Martina Hingis • 2017 US Open mixed doubles champion, partnering Martina Hingis • 2018 US Open mixed doubles champion, partnering Bethanie Mattek-Sands • 2019 US Open mixed doubles champion, partnering Bethanie Mattek-Sands • ranked doubles world no. 1 for 9 weeks in 2016
Rafael Nadal	1986	–	Spain		ranked doubles world no. 26 in 2005 • 2016 Olympic gold medalist, partnering Marc López
**Ilie Năstase**	1946	–	Romania	1991	3 Grand Slam doubles titles and 2 Grand Slam mixed doubles titles, both partnering Rosie Casals → 1970 French Open doubles champion, partnering Ion Țiriac • 1973 Wimbledon doubles champion, partnering Jimmy Connors • 1975 US Open doubles champion, partnering Jimmy Connors • 1970 Wimbledon mixed doubles champion • 1972 Wimbledon mixed doubles champion • ranked world no. 9 in 1976
Carr Neel	1873	1949	United States		1 Grand Slam doubles titles → 1896 US champion, partnering Sam Neel
**Daniel Nestor**	1972	–	Canada		8 Grand Slam doubles titles and 4 Grand Slam mixed doubles titles → 2002 Australian Open champion, partnering Mark Knowles • 2004 US Open champion, partnering Mark Knowles • 2007/2010/2011/2012 French Open champion, partnering Mark Knowles, Nenad Zimonjić and Max Mirnyi • 2008/2009 Wimbledon champion, both partnering Nenad Zimonjic • 2007/2011/2014 Australian Open mixed doubles champion, partnering Elena Likhovtseva, Katarina Srebotnik and Kristina Mladenovic • 2013 Wimbledon mixed doubles champion, partnering Kristina Mladenovic • ranked world no. 1 for 108 weeks in 2002/2004/2005/2009/2010/2012 • 2000 Olympic gold medal, partnering Sébastien Lareau
**John Newcombe**	1944	–	Australia	1986	17 Grand Slam doubles titles and 2 Grand Slam mixed doubles titles, both partnering Margaret Court → 1965/1967/1971/1973/1976 Australian Open champion, partnering Tony Roche and Mal Anderson • 1965/1966/1968/1969/1970/1974 Wimbledon champion, partnering Tony Roche and Ken Fletcher • 1967/1969/1973 French Open champion, partnering Tony Roche and Tom Okker • 1967/1969/1973 French Open champion, partnering Tony Roche, Roger Taylor and Owen Davidson • 1967/1971/1973 US Open champion • 1964 US Open mixed doubles champion • 1965 Australian Open mixed doubles champion • ranked doubles world no. 1 in 1965
Frederik Nielsen	1983	–	Denmark		1 Grand Slam doubles title → 2012 Wimbledon champion, partnering Jonathan Marray • ranked world no. 15 in 2013
Kurt Nielsen	1930	2011	Denmark		1 Grand Slam mixed doubles title → 1957 US champion, partnering Althea Gibson
Tom Nijssen	1964		Netherlands		2 Grand Slam mixed doubles titles, all partnering Manon Bollegraf → 1989 French Open champion • 1991 US Open champion • ranked world no. 10 in 1992
Nathaniel Niles	1886	1932	United States		1 Grand Slam mixed doubles title → 1908 United States champion mixed doubles, partnering Edith Rotch
**Yannick Noah**	1960	–	France	2005	1 Grand Slam doubles title → 1984 French Open champion, partnering Henri Leconte • ranked doubles world no. 1 for 19 weeks in 1986/1987
Brian Norton	1899	1956	South Africa		1 Grand Slam doubles title → 1923 US champion
Piet Norval	1970	–	South Africa		1 Grand Slam mixed doubles title → 1999 French Open champion, partnering Katarina Srebotnik • ranked world no. 16 in 1995
Joakim Nyström	1963	–	Sweden		1 Grand Slam doubles titles → 1986 Wimbledon champion, partnering Mats Wilander • ranked world no. 4 in 1986
**Alex O'Brien**	1970	–	United States		1 Grand Slam doubles title → 1999 US Open champion, partnering Sébastien Lareau • ranked doubles world no. 1 for 5 weeks in 2000
**Tom Okker**	1944	–	Netherlands		2 Grand Slam doubles titles → 1973 French Open champion, partnering John Newcombe • 1976 US Open champion, partnering Marty Riessen • ranked doubles world no. 1 for 11 weeks in 1979
Andrei Olhovskiy	1966	–	Soviet Union / Russia		2 Grand Slam mixed doubles titles → 1993 French Open champion, partnering Eugenia Maniokova • 1994 Australian Open champion, partnering Larisa Neiland • ranked world no. 6 in 1995
**Alex Olmedo**	1936	2020	United States	1987	1 Grand Slam doubles title → 1958 US champion, partnering Ham Richardson
Menno Oosting	1964	1999	Netherlands		1 Grand Slam mixed doubles title → 1994 French Open champion, partnering Kristie Boogert • ranked world no. 20 in 1995
Manuel Orantes	1949	–	/ Spain	2012	1 Grand Slam singles title → 1975 **US Open champion**, 1976/1977 quarterfinalist • 1974 French Open finalist, 1972 semifinalist, 1976/1978 quarterfinalist • 1972 Wimbledon semifinalist • 1968 Australian Open quarterfinalist • 1976 **Masters champion**
Rafael Osuna	1938	1969	Mexico	1979	3 Grand Slam doubles titles → 1960/1963 Wimbledon champion • 1962 US Open champion, ranked world no. 1 in 1963
**Leander Paes**	1973	–	India	2024	8 Grand Slam doubles titles and 10 Grand Slam mixed doubles titles, partnering Martina Navratilova, Cara Black and Martina Hingis → 1999/2001/2009 French Open champion, partnering Mahesh Bhupathi and Lukáš Dlouhý respectively • 1999 Wimbledon champion, partnering Mahesh Bhupathi • 2006/2009/2013 US Open champion, partnering Martin Damm, Lukáš Dlouhý and Radek Štěpánek • 2012 Australian Open champion, partnering Radek Štěpánek → 1999/2003/2010/2015 Wimbledon champion • 2003/2010/2015 Australian Open champion • 2008/2015 US champion → 2016 French Champion • ranked world no. 1 for 39 weeks in 1999/2000
Josip Palada	1912	1994	(Socialist Federal Republic of Yugoslavia) Yugoslavia		1938 French Championships singles semifinalist
Antonio Palafox	1936	–	Mexico		2 Grand Slam doubles titles → 1962 US National champion • 1963 Wimbledon champion
**Jared Palmer**	1971	–	United States		2 Grand Slam doubles titles and 2 Grand Slam mixed doubles titles → 1995 Australian Open champion, partnering Richey Reneberg • 2001 Wimbledon champion, partnering Donald Johnson • 2000 Australian Open mixed doubles champion, partnering Rennae Stubbs • 2000 US Open mixed doubles champion, partnering Arantxa Sánchez Vicario • ranked world no. 1 in doubles for 17 weeks in 2000/2002
Jahial Parmly Paret	1870	1952	United States		1899 US Championships singles finalist
James Cecil Parke	1881	1946	(United Kingdom) Great Britain		1 Grand Slam doubles title → 1912 Australian champion
**Frank Parker**	1916	1997	United States	1966	3 Grand Slam doubles titles → 1943 US champion, 1949 French champion, 1949 Wimbledon champion
Travis Parrott	1980	–	United States		1 Grand Slam mixed doubles title → 2009 US Open mixed doubles champion, partnering Carly Gullickson • ranked world no. 25 in 2009
Onny Parun	1947	–	New Zealand		1 Grand Slam doubles title → 1974 French Open champion, partnering Dick Crealy • ranked world no. 89 in 1976
**David Pate**	1962	–	United States		1 Grand Slam doubles title → 1991 Australian Open, partnering Scott Davis • ranked doubles world no. 1 for 25 weeks in 1991
**Henry Patten**	1996	–	(United Kingdom) Great Britain		3 Grand Slam doubles titles, both partnering Harri Heliövaara → 2024/2026 Wimbledon champion • 2025 Australian Open champion • ranked doubles world no. 1 for 24 weeks in 2026
**Gerald Patterson**	1895	1967	Australia	1989	Rated co-**world no. 1** in 1919 with "Little Bill" Johnston
**Budge Patty**	1924	2021	United States	1977	1 Grand Slam doubles titles → 1957 Wimbledon champion — 1 Grand Slam mixed doubles title → 1946 French champion
**Mate Pavić**	1993	–	Croatia		4 Grand Slam doubles titles and 3 Grand Slam mixed doubles titles → 2018 Australian Open champion, partnering Oliver Marach • 2020 US Open champion, partnering Bruno Soares • 2021 Wimbledon champion, partnering Nikola Mektić • 2024 French Open champion, partnering Marcelo Arévalo • 2016 US Open mixed doubles champion, partnering Laura Siegemund • 2018 Australian Open mixed doubles champion, partnering Gabriela Dabrowski • 2023 Wimbledon mixed doubles champion, partnering Lyudmyla Kichenok • ranked doubles world no. 1 for 97 weeks in 2018/2021/2022/2024/2025 • 2020 Olympic gold medalist, partnering Mektić
John Peers	1988	–	Australia		1 Grand Slam doubles title and 3 Grand Slam mixed doubles titles → 2017 Australian Open champion, partnering Henri Kontinen • 2022 US Open mixed doubles champion, partnering Storm Hunter • 2025 Australian Open mixed doubles champion, partnering Olivia Gadecki • 2026 Australian Open mixed doubles champion, partnering Olivia Gadecki • ranked doubles world no. 2 in 2017
**Fred Perry**	1909	1995	(United Kingdom) Great Britain	1975	8 Grand Slam singles titles, including a Career Slam → 1933/1934/1936 **US champion** • 1934/1935/1936 **Wimbledon champion** • 1934 **Australian champion**, 1935 finalist • 1935 **French champion**, 1936 finalist • rated **world no. 1** for 5 years
**Yvon Petra**	1916	1984	France	2016	2 Grand Slam doubles titles → 1938, 1946 French champion, partnering Bernard Destremau and Marcel Bernard
**Philipp Petzschner**	1984	–	Germany		2 Grand Slam doubles titles → 2010 Wimbledon champion • 2011 US Open champion, both partnering Jürgen Melzer
Alexander Peya	1980	–	Austria		1 Grand Slam mixed doubles title → 2018 Wimbledon mixed doubles champion, partnering Melanie Oudin • ranked world no. 3 in 2013
**Hank Pfister**	1953	–	United States		2 Grand Slam doubles title → 1978 French Open champion, partnering Gene Mayer • 1980 French Open champion, partnering Victor Amaya • ranked world no. 12 in 1982
**Nicola Pietrangeli**	1933	2025	Italy	1986	2 Grand Slam singles titles → 1959 and 1960 French Open champion, 1961 and 1964 finalist, 1960 Wimbledon semifinalist • ranked world no. 3 in 1959
Nikola Pilić	1939	2025	(Socialist Federal Republic of Yugoslavia) Yugoslavia		1973 French Open singles finalist • 1970 US Open doubles champion
**Joshua Pim**	1869	1942	(Republic of Ireland) Ireland		2 Grand Slam singles titles → 1893, 1894 **Wimbledon champion**
Filip Polášek	1985	–	Slovakia		1 Grand Slam doubles title → 2021 Australian Open champion, partnering Ivan Dodig • ranked world no. 7 in 2020
Vasek Pospisil	1990	-	Canada		1 Grand Slam doubles title → 2014 Wimbledon doubles champion, partnering Jack Sock • ranked world no. 4 in 2015
**Jim Pugh**	1964	–	United States		3 Grand Slam doubles titles, all partnering Rick Leach and 5 Grand Slam mixed doubles titles → 1988/1989 Australian Open champion • 1990 Wimbledon champion • 1988/1989/1990 Australian Open mixed doubles champion, partnering Jana Novotná and Natasha Zvereva • 1989 Wimbledon mixed doubles champion, partnering Jana Novotná • 1988 US Open mixed doubles champion, partnering Jana Novotná • ranked doubles world no. 1 for 26 weeks in 1989/1990
Franjo Punčec	1913	1985	(Socialist Federal Republic of Yugoslavia) Yugoslavia		1938, 1939 French Championships singles quarterfinalist, 1946 Wimbledon singles quarterfinalist,
**Max Purcell**	1998	–	Australia		2 Grand Slam doubles titles → 2022 Wimbledon champion, partnering Matthew Ebden • 2024 US Open champion, partnering Jordan Thompson • ranked world no. 8 in 2024
Tim Pütz	1987	–	Germany		1 Grand Slam mixed doubles title → 2023 French Open champion, partnering Miyu Kato • ranked world no. 6 in 2025
**Adrian Quist**	1913	1991	Australia	1984	14 Grand Slam doubles titles → 1936/1937/1938/1939/1940/1946/1947/1948/1949/1950 Australian champion, the first two partnering Don Turnbull, the last eight with John Bromwich • 1935 French champion with Jack Crawford • 1935/1950 Wimbledon champion with Crawford and Bromwich • 1939 US Champion with Bromwich
Patrick Rafter	1972	–	Australia	2006	1 Grand Slam singles title → 1999 Australian Open champion, partnering Jonas Björkman • ranked world no. 6 in 1999
Dennis Ralston	1942	2020	United States	1987	1966 Wimbledon finalist
Andy Ram	1980	–	Israel		1 Grand Slam doubles title and 2 Grand Slam mixed doubles titles → 2008 Australian Open champion, partnering Jonathan Erlich • 2006 Wimbledon champion, partnering Vera Zvonareva • 2007 French Open champion, partnering Nathalie Dechy • ranked world no. 5 in 2008
**Rajeev Ram**	1984	–	United States		4 Grand Slam doubles titles, all partnering Joe Salisbury and 2 Grand Slam mixed doubles titles, all partnering Barbora Krejčíková → 2021/2022/2023 US Open champion • 2020 Australian Open champion • 2019/2021 Australian Open mixed doubles champion • ranked doubles world no. 1 for 9 weeks in 2022/2023
**Raúl Ramírez**	1953	–	Mexico		3 Grand Slam doubles titles all partnering Brian Gottfried → 1975/1977 French Open champion • 1976 Wimbledon champion • ranked doubles world no. 1 for 62 weeks in 1976/1977
Louis Raymond	1895	1962	South Africa		1924 Wimbledon singles semifinalist • 1927 French Championships quarterfinalist • **1920 Olympic singles gold medalist**
**Richey Reneberg**	1965	–	United States		2 Grand Slam doubles titles → 1992 US Open champion, partnering Jim Grabb • 1995 Australian Open champion, partnering Jared Palmer • ranked doubles world no. 1 for 13 weeks in 1993
**Ernest Renshaw**	1861	1899	(United Kingdom) Great Britain	1983	7 Grand Slam doubles titles → 1980/1881/1884/1885/1886/1888/1889 Wimbledon champion, all partnering twin brother William Renshaw
**William Renshaw**	1861	1904	(United Kingdom) Great Britain	1983	7 Grand Slam doubles titles → 1980/1881/1884/1885/1886/1888/1889 Wimbledon champion, partnering twin brother /Ernest Renshaw
**Vinnie Richards**	1903	1959	United States	1961	7 Grand Slam doubles titles → 1918/1921/1922/1925/1926 US champion • 1924 Wimbledon champion • 1926 French champion • 1924 Olympic gold medalist, partnering Frank Hunter
**Bobby Riggs**	1918	1995	United States	1967	3 Grand Slam singles titles → 1939 **Wimbledon champion**, 1939, 1941 **US champion** • ranked **world no. 1** for 3 years
**Marty Riessen**	1941	–	United States		2 Grand Slam doubles titles and 7 mixed doubles titles → 1971 French Open champion, partnering Arthur Ashe • 1976 US Open champion, partnering Tom Okker • 1969 Australian Open mixed doubles champion, partnering Margaret Court • 1969 French Open mixed doubles champion, partnering Margaret Court • 1969/1970/1972/1980 US Open mixed doubles champion, partnering Margaret Court and Wendy Turnbull • 1975 Wimbledon mixed doubles champion, partnering Margaret Court • ranked world no. 3 in 1979
Frank Riseley	1877	1959	(United Kingdom) Great Britain		1903(Ch), 1904(Ch), and 1906(Ch) Wimbledon finalist
Major Ritchie	1870	1955	(United Kingdom) Great Britain		1902, 1903, 1904, and 1909(Ch) Wimbledon finalist
**Tony Roche**	1945	–	Australia	1986	13 Grand Slam doubles titles and 2 Grand Slam mixed doubles titles → 1965/1967/1971/1976/1977[Jan] Australian Open champion, parntering John Newcombe and Arthur Ashe • 1967/1969 French Open champion, parntering John Newcombe • 1965/1968/1969/1970/1974 Wimbledon champion, parntering John Newcombe • 1967 US Open champion, parntering John Newcombe • 1966 Australian Open mixed doubles champion, partnering Judy Tegart-Dalton • 1976 Wimbledon mixed doubles champion, partnering Françoise Dürr • ranked doubles world no. 1 in 1965
Olivier Rochus	1981	–	Belgium		1 Grand Slam doubles title → 2004 French Open champion, partnering Xavier Malisse • ranked world no. 24 in 2005
**Jean-Julien Rojer**	1981	–	Netherlands		3 Grand Slam doubles titles → 2015 Wimbledon Championships, partnering Horia Tecău • 2017 US Open, partnering Horia Tecău • 2022 French Open champion, partnering Marcelo Arévalo • ranked doubles world no. 3 in 2015
Édouard Roger-Vasselin	1983	–	France		1 Grand Slam doubles title and 1 Grand Slam mixed doubles title → 2014 French Open champion, partnering Julien Benneteau • 2024 French Open mixed doubles champion, partnering Laura Siegemund • ranked world no. 6 in 2014
**Mervyn Rose**	1930	2017	Australia	2001	2 Grand Slam singles titles → 1954 **Australian champion** • 1958 **French champion** – 4 Grand Slam doubles title → 1952 and 1953 United States champion, partnering Vic Seixas and Rex Hartwig respectively • 1954 Australian Champion, partnering Hartwig • 1954 Wimbledon champion, partnering Hartwig – ranked world no. 3 in 1958
**Ken Rosewall**	1934	–	Australia	1980	9 Grand Slam doubles titles and 1 Grand Slam mixed doubles title → 1953/1956/1972 Australian Open champion, partnering Lew Hoad and Owen Davidson • 1953/1968 French Open champion, partnering Lew Hoad and Fred Stolle • 1953/1956 Wimbledon champion, both partnering Lew Hoad • 1956/1969 US Open champion, partnering Lew Hoad and Fred Stolle • 1956 US Open mixed doubles champion, partnering Margaret Osborne duPont • ranked world no.1 in 1961, 1962 and 1963
Marc Rosset	1970	–	Switzerland		1 Grand Slam doubles title → 1992 French Open champion, partnering Jakob Hlasek • ranked world no. 8 in 1992
Andrey Rublev	1997	–	Russia		2020 mixed Olympic gold medalist, partnering Anastasia Pavlyuchenkova • ranked doubles world no. 44 in 2023
Ray Ruffels	1946	–	Australia		1 Grand Slam doubles title → 1977[Dec] Australian Open champion, partnering Allan Stone • ranked world no. 16 in 1978
John Van Ryn	1905	1999	United States	1963	6 Grand Slam doubles titles → 1929, 1930, 1931 Wimbledon champion • 1931, 1935 US champion • 1931 French champion
**Joe Salisbury**	1992	–	(United Kingdom) Great Britain		4 Grand Slam doubles titles, all partnering Rajeev Ram and 2 Grand Slam mixed doubles titles, all partnering Desirae Krawczyk → 2021/2022/2023 US Open champion • 2020 Australian Open champion • 2021 French Open mixed doubles champion • 2021 US Open mixed doubles champion • ranked doubles world no. 1 for 26 weeks in 2022
**Emilio Sánchez**	1965	–	Spain		3 Grand Slam doubles titles and 2 Grand Slam mixed doubles titles → 1988/1990 French Open champion with Andrés Gómez and Sergio Casal • 1988 US Open champions with Sergio Casal • 1987 French Open mixed doubles champion, partnering Pam Shriver • 1987 US Open mixed doubles champion, partnering Martina Navratilova • ranked doubles world no. 1 for 6 weeks in 1989
**Manuel Santana**	1938	2021	Spain	1984	1 Grand Slam doubles title → 1963 French champion
**Fabrice Santoro**	1972	–	France		2 Grand Slam doubles titles and 1 Grand Slam mixed doubles title → 2003/2004 Australian Open champion, both partnering Michaël Llodra • 2005 French Open champion, partnering Daniela Hantuchová • ranked world no. 6 in 1999
Jiro Sato	1908	1934	Japan		1931/1933 French championship semifinalist • 1932 Australian championship semifinalist • 1932/1933 Wimbledon semifinalist, 1931 quarterfinalist
**Dick Savitt**	1927	2023	United States	1976	2 Grand Slam singles titles → 1951 **Wimbledon champion** • 1951 **Australian champion** • 1950/1951 US semifinalist, 1956 quarterfinalist – ranked world no. 2
Ulf Schmidt	1934		Sweden		1 Grand Slam doubles title → 1958 Wimbledon champion, partnering Sven Davidson
**Ted Schroeder**	1921	2006	United States	1966	2 Grand Slam singles titles → 1942 **US champion**, 1949 finalist • 1949 **Wimbledon champion** — 3 Grand Slam doubles titles → 1940/1941/1947 US champion, all partnering **Jack Kramer**
**Richard Sears**	1861	1943	United States	1955	6 Grand Slam doubles titles → 1882–1887 US champion
**Frank Sedgman**	1927	–	Australia	1979	9 Grand Slam doubles titles and a calendar year Grand Slam (1951) → 1948/1951/1952 Wimbledon champion • 1950/1951 US champion • 1951/1952 Australian champion • 1951/1952 French champion — 8 Grand Slam mixed doubles titles → 1949/1950 Australian champion • 1951/1952 French champion • 1951/1952 Wimbledon champion • 1951/1952 US champion • considered **world no. 1** amateur for 1952
Abe Segal	1930	2016	South Africa		1964 Wimbledon quarterfinalist
**Pancho Segura**	1921	2017	United States	1984	1942/1943/1944/1945/1946/1947 US semifinalist • considered **world no. 1** professional for 1950 and 1952
**Robert Seguso**	1963	–	United States		4 Grand Slam doubles titles → 1987 French Open champion, partnering Anders Järryd • 1987/1988 Wimbledon champion, both partnering Ken Flach • 1985 US Open champion, partnering Ken Flach • ranked doubles world no. 1 for 62 weeks in 1985/1986/1987/1988 • 1988 Olympic gold medalist, partnering Ken Flach
**Vic Seixas**	1923	2024	United States	1971	5 Grand Slam doubles titles → 1955 Australian champion, partnering Tony Trabert • 1954, 1955 French champion with Tony Trabert • 1952, 1954 US champion, partnering Mervyn Rose and Trabert respectively.
Bill Sidwell	1920	2021	Australia		1 Grand Slam doubles titles → 1949 US champion, partnering **John Bromwich** – ranked world no. 10 in 1949
Hans Simonsson	1962	–	Sweden		1 Grand Slam doubles titles → 1983 French Open champion, partnering Anders Järryd • ranked world no. 10 in 1984
Orlando Sirola	1928	1995	Italy		1 Grand Slam doubles titles → 1959 French champion, partnering **Nicola Pietrangeli**
Dick Skeen	1906	1994	United States		Ranked no. 2 in professional tennis in 1941
**Neal Skupski**	1989	–	(United Kingdom) Great Britain		3 Grand Slam doubles titles and 2 Grand Slam mixed doubles titles → 2023 Wimbledon champion, partnering Wesley Koolhof • 2026 Australian Open champion, partnering Christian Harrison • 2026 US Open champion, partnering Christian Harrison • 2021 Wimbledon mixed doubles champion, partnering Desirae Krawczyk • 2022 Wimbledon mixed doubles champion, partnering Desirae Krawczyk • ranked doubles world no. 1 for 50 weeks in 2022/2023/2026
**Henry Slocum**	1862	1949	United States	1955	2 Grand Slam singles titles → 1888/1889 **US champion**, 1887/1890 finalist — 1 Grand Slam doubles title → 1889 US champion
Pavel Složil	1955	–	Czechoslovakia		1 Grand Slam mixed doubles title → 1978 French Open champion, partnering Renáta Tomanová • ranked world no. 4 in 1985
**Tomáš Šmíd**	1956	–	Czechoslovakia		2 Grand Slam doubles titles, both partnering John Fitzgerald → 1984 US Open champion • 1986 French Open champion • ranked doubles world no. 1 for 34 weeks in 1984/1985
**Stan Smith**	1946	–	United States	1987	5 Grand Slam singles titles, all partnering Bob Lutz → 1970 Australian Open doubles champion • 1968/1974/1978/1980 US Open doubles champion • ranked doubles world no. 1 for 8 weeks in 1981
Sydney Howard Smith	1872	1947	(United Kingdom) Great Britain		1899, 1900(Ch), 1905 Wimbledon finalist • 2 Grand Slam doubles titles → 1902, 1906 Wimbledon champion
**Bruno Soares**	1982	-	Brazil		3 Grand Slam doubles titles and 3 Grand Slam mixed doubles titles → 2016 Australian Open doubles champion, partnering Jamie Murray • 2016 US Open doubles champion, partnering Jamie Murray • 2020 US Open doubles champion, partnering Mate Pavić • 2012 US Open mixed doubles champion, partnering Ekaterina Makarova • 2014 US Open mixed doubles champion, partnering Sania Mirza • 2016 Australian Open mixed doubles champion, partnering Elena Vesnina • ranked world no. 2 in 2016
**Jack Sock**	1992	-	United States		3 Grand Slam doubles titles and 1 Grand Slam mixed doubles title → 2014 Wimbledon doubles champion, partnering Vasek Pospisil • 2018 Wimbledon doubles champion, partnering Mike Bryan • 2018 US Open doubles champion, partnering Mike Bryan • 2011 US Open mixed doubles champion, partnering Melanie Oudin • ranked world no. 2 in 2018 • 2016 mixed Olympic gold medalist, partnering Bethanie Mattek-Sands
Harold Solomon	1952	–	United States		Ranked world no. 5 in 1980
Pat Spence	1872	1947	South Africa		1927 French Championships singles semifinalist, 1926 Wimbledon singles quarterfinalist • 2 Grand Slam mixed doubles titles → 1928 Wimbledon champion, partnering Elizabeth Ryan, 1931 French champion, partnering Betty Nuthall
**Jonathan Stark**	1971	–	United States		1 Grand Slam doubles title and 1 Grand Slam mixed doubles title → 1994 French Open champion, partnering Byron Black • 1995 Wimbledon mixed doubles champion, partnering Martina Navratilova • ranked doubles world no. 1 for 6 weeks in 1994
**Radek Štěpánek**	1978	–	Czech Republic		2 Grand Slam doubles titless → 2012 Australian Open champion both partnering Leander Paes • 2012 Australian Open champion, partnering Leander Paes • ranked world no. 4 in 2012
**Sherwood Stewart**	1946	–	United States		3 Grand Slam doubles titles and 2 Grand Slam mixed doubles titles, all partnering Zina Garrison → 1976 French Open champion, partnering Fred McNair • 1982 French Open champion, partnering Ferdi Taygan • 1984 Australian Open champion, partnering Mark Edmondson • 1987 Australian Open mixed doubles champion • 1988 Wimbledon mixed doubles champion • ranked world no. 4 in 1980
Michael Stich	1968	–	Germany	2018	1 Grand Slam doubles titles → 1992 Wimbledon champion, partnering John McEnroe • 1992 Olympic gold medalist, partnering Boris Becker • ranked world no. 9 in 1991
Dick Stockton	1951	–	United States		2 Grand Slam mixed doubles titles → 1975 US Open mixed doubles champion, partnering Rosie Casals • 1984 French Open mixed doubles champion, partnering Anne Smith • ranked world no. 13 in 1977
Lester Stoefen	1911	1970	United States		1934 US Championships semifinalist, 1934 and 1935 doubles winner
**Fred Stolle**	1938	2025	Australia	1985	10 Grand Slam doubles titles and 7 mixed doubles titles → 1962/1964 Wimbledon champion, partnering Bob Hewitt • 1963/1964/1966 Australian Open champion, partnering Bob Hewitt and Roy Emerson • 1965/1968 French Open champion, partnering Roy Emerson and Ken Rosewall • 1965/1966/1969 US Open champion, partnering Roy Emerson and Ken Rosewall • 1961/1964/1969 Wimbledon mixed doubles champion, partnering Lesley Turner Bowrey and Ann Haydon-Jones • 1962/1969 Australian mixed doubles champion, partnering Lesley Turner Bowrey and Ann Haydon-Jones • 1962/1965 US mixed doubles champion, partnering Margaret Court • ranked world no. 1 in 1964
Sandon Stolle	1970	–	Australia		1 Grand Slam doubles title → 1998 US Open champion, partnering Cyril Suk • ranked world no. 2 in 2001
**Allan Stone**	1945	–	Australia		2 Grand Slam doubles titles → 1968/1977[Dec] Australian Open champion, partnering Dick Crealy and Ray Ruffels • ranked world no. 12 in 1976
Eric Sturgess	1920	2004	South Africa		1 Grand Slam doubles title → 1947 French Championships champion, partnering Eustace Fannin
Cyril Suk	1967	–	Czechoslovakia / Czech Republic		1 Grand Slam doubles title and 4 Grand Slam mixed doubles titles → 1998 US Open champion, partnering Sandon Stolle • 1991 French Open champion, partnering sister Helena Suková • 1992/1996/1997 Wimbledon champion, the first partnering Larisa Neiland, the other two with Helena Suková • ranked world no. 7 in 1994
Tom Tachell	1870s	1900s	Australia		1 Grand Slam doubles title → 1905 Wimbledon champion, partnering Randolph Lycett
Bill Talbert	1918	1999	United States	1967	5 Grand Slam doubles titles → 1942, 1945, 1946, 1948 US champion, partnering Gardnar Mulloy • 1950 French champion, partnering Tony Trabert.
**Balázs Taróczy**	1954	–	Hungary		2 Grand Slam doubles titles, both partnering Heinz Günthardt → 1981 French Open champion • 1985 Wimbledon champion • ranked world no. 3 in 1985
Ferdi Taygan	1956	–	United States		1 Grand Slam doubles title → 1982 French Open champion, partnering Sherwood Stewart • ranked world no. 4 in 1982
Fred Taylor	1856	1915	United States		1 Grand Slam doubles title → 1881 US Champion, partnering Clarence Clark
Howard Taylor	1865	1920	United States		1 Grand Slam doubles title → 1889 US champion, partnering Henry Slocum
**Roger Taylor**	1941	–	United Kingdom		2 Grand Slam doubles titles → 1971/1972 US Open champion, partnering John Newcombe and Cliff Drysdale • ranked world no. 38 in 1978
**Horia Tecău**	1985	–	Romania		2 Grand Slam doubles titles, all partnering Jean-Julien Rojer and 1 Grand Slam mixed doubles title → 2015 Wimbledon champion • 2017 US Open champion • 2012 Australian Open mixed doubles champion, partnering Bethanie Mattek-Sands • ranked world no. 3 in 2015
Eliot Teltscher	1959	–	United States		1 Grand Slam mixed doubles title → 1983 French Open champion, partnering Barbara Jordan • ranked doubles world no. 38 in 1985
Jordan Thompson	1994	–	Australia		1 Grand Slam doubles title → 2024 US Open champion, partnering Max Purcell • ranked world no. 3 in 2024
**Bill Tilden**	1893	1953	United States	1959	10 Grand Slam singles titles → 1920/1921/1922/1923/1924/1925/1929 **US champion** • 1920/1921/1930 **Wimbledon champion** • 7 times **world no. 1**
Ion Țiriac	1939	–	Romania	2013	1 Grand Slam doubles title → 1970 French Open champion, partnering Ilie Năstase • ranked world no. 8 in 1979
**Tony Trabert**	1930	2021	United States	1970	5 Grand Slam doubles titles → 1950/1954/1955 French champion, the first partnering Bill Talbert, the other two with Vic Seixas • 1954 US champion, partnering Seixas • 1955 Australian champion, partnering Seixas
Friedrich Traun	1876	1908	Germany		1896 Olympic gold medalist, partnering John Boland
Noel Turnbull	1890	1970	(United Kingdom) Great Britain		1920 Olympic gold medalist, partnering Max Woosnam
**Kevin Ullyett**	1972	–	Zimbabwe		2 Grand Slam doubles titles, all partnering Wayne Black and 1 Grand Slam mixed doubles title → 2001 US Open champion • 2005 Australian Open • 2002 Australian Open mixed doubles champion, partnering Daniela Hantuchová • ranked world no. 4 in 2005
Christo van Rensburg	1962	–	South Africa		1 Grand Slam doubles title → 1985 Australian Open champion, partnering Paul Annacone • ranked world no. 5 in 1987
**Daniel Vacek**	1971	–	Czechoslovakia / Czech Republic		3 Grand Slam doubles titles, all partnering Yevgeny Kafelnikov → 1996/1997 French Open champion • 1997 US Open champion • ranked world no. 3 in 1997
Andrea Vavassori	1995	–	Italy		4 Grand Slam mixed doubles titles all partnering Sara Errani → 2024/2025 US Open mixed doubles champion • 2025/2026 French Open mixed doubles champion • ranked world no. 6 in 2024
Michael Venus	1987	–	New Zealand		1 Grand Slam doubles title → 2017 French Open champion, partnering Ryan Harrison • ranked doubles world no. 6 in 2022
Sem Verbeek	1994	–	Netherlands		1 Grand Slam mixed doubles title → 2025 Wimbledon champion, partnering Kateřina Siniaková • ranked world no. 29 in 2025
**Ellsworth Vines**	1911	1994	United States	1962	2 Grand Slam doubles titles → 1932 US champion • 1933 Australian Champion, both with Keith Gledhill • 1 Grand Slam mixed doubles titles → 1933 US champion, partnering Elizabeth Ryan
**Danie Visser**	1961	–	South Africa		3 Grand Slam doubles titles → 1990/1993 Australian Open champion, the partnering Pieter Aldrich and Laurie Warder • 1990 US Open champion, partnering Pieter Aldrich • ranked doubles world no. 1 for 27 weeks in 1990/1991
Holcombe Ward	1878	1961	United States	1956	6 Grand Slam doubles title → 1899–1901, 1904–1906 US champion, partnering Dwight F. Davis (1898, 1899, 1901) and Beals Wright (1904, 1905, 1906)
Laurie Warder	1962	–	Australia		1 Grand Slam doubles title → 1993 Australian Open champion with Danie Visser • ranked world no. 12 in 1991
Leo Ware	1876	1914	United States		2 Grand Slam doubles title → 1897, 1898 US Champion, partnering George Sheldon
**Kim Warwick**	1952	–	Australia		4 Grand Slam doubles titles and 2 Grand Slam mixed doubles titles → 1978/1980/1981 Australian Open champion, the first with Wojtek Fibak, the last two with Mark Edmondson • 1985 French Open champion with Mark Edmondson • 1972 French Open mixed doubles champion, partnering Evonne Goolagong Cawley • 1976 French Open mixed doubles champion, partnering Ilana Kloss • ranked world no. 10 in 1985
Stan Wawrinka	1985	–	Switzerland		2008 Olympic gold medalist, partnering Roger Federer • ranked doubles world no. 88 in 2015
Mats Wilander	1964	–	Sweden	2002	1 Grand Slam doubles title → 1986 Wimbledon champion with Joakim Nyström • ranked world no. 3 in 1985
**Anthony Wilding**	1883	1915	New Zealand	1978	6 Grand Slam singles titles → 1906/1909 **Australian champion**, 1910/1911/1912/1913 **Wimbledon champion**
**R. Norris Williams**	1891	1968	United States	1957	3 Grand Slam doubles titles → 1920 Wimbledon champion, partnering Chuck Garland • 1925/1926 US champion, both partnering Vincent Richards • 1 Olympic mixed doubles gold medal → 1924 gold medalist with Hazel Hotchkiss Wightman
Charles Winslow	1888	1963	South Africa		1912 Olympic gold medalist, partnering Harold Kitson
**Todd Woodbridge**	1971	–	Australia	2010	Further information: The Woodies 16 Grand Slam doubles titles and 6 Grand Slam mixed doubles titles → 1995/1996/2003 US Open champion with Mark Woodforde, Jonas Björkman • 1992/1997/2001 Australian Open champion with Mark Woodforde, Jonas Björkman • 1993/1994/1995/1996/1997/2000/2002/2003/2004 Wimbledon champion with Mark Woodforde, Jonas Björkman • 2000 French Open champion with Mark Woodforde • 1990/1993/2001 US Open champion with Elizabeth Smylie, Helena Suková, Rennae Stubbs • 1993 Australian Open champion with Arantxa Sánchez Vicario • 1994 Wimbledon champion with Helena Suková • 1995 French Open champion with Larisa Savchenko • ranked doubles world no. 1 for 205 weeks in 1992/1993/1995/1996/1997/1998/2000/2001 • 1996 Olympic gold medal, partnering Mark Woodforde
**Mark Woodforde**	1965	–	Australia	2010	Further information: The Woodies 12 Grand Slam doubles titles and 5 Grand Slam mixed doubles titles → 1989/1995/1996 US Open champion, partnering John McEnroe, Todd Woodbridge • 1992/1997 Australian Open champion, both partnering Todd Woodbridge • 1993/1994/1995/1996/1997/2000 Wimbledon champion, all partnering Todd Woodbridge • 2000 French Open champion, partnering all Todd Woodbridge • 1992/1996 Australian Open champion, both partnering Nicole Provis • 1992 French Open champion, partnering Arantxa Sánchez Vicario • 1992 US Open champion, partnering Nicole Provis • 1993 Wimbledon champion, partnering Martina Navratilova • ranked doubles world no. 1 for 83 weeks in 1992/1993/1995/1996/1997/2000/2001 • 1996 Olympic gold medal, partnering Todd Woodbridge
Max Woosnam	1892	1965	(United Kingdom) Great Britain		1 Grand Slam doubles title → 1921 Wimbledon champion, partnering Randolph Lycett • 1920 Olympic gold medalist, partnering Noel Turnbull
**Robert Wrenn**	1873	1925	United States	1955	1 Grand Slam doubles title → 1895, partnering Malcolm Chance
**Beals Wright**	1879	1925	United States	1956	3 Grand Slam doubles titles → 1904, 1905 and 1906 US champion, partnering Holcombe Ward • 1904 Olympic gold doubles medalist, partnering Edgar Leonard
**Horacio Zeballos**	1985	–	Argentina		3 Grand Slam doubles titles → 2025/2026 French Open champion, partnering Marcel Granollers • 2025 US Open champion, partnering Marcel Granollers • ranked doubles world no. 1 for 25 weeks in 2024/2026
Jan Zieliński	1996	–	Poland		2 Grand Slam mixed doubles titles all partnering Hsieh Su-wei → 2024 Australian Open mixed doubles champion • 2024 Wimbledon mixed doubles champion • ranked world no. 7 in 2023
**Nenad Zimonjić**	1976	–	Serbia		3 Grand Slam doubles titles, all partnering Daniel Nestor and 5 Grand Slam mixed doubles titles → 2008/2009 Wimbledon champion • 2010 French Open champion • 2004/2008 Australian Open champion the first with Elena Bovina and Sun Tiantian • 2006/2010 French Open champion (both with Katarina Srebotnik) • 2014 Wimbledon mixed doubles champion, partnering Samantha Stosur • ranked world no. 1 for 43 weeks in 2008/2009/2010
**Slobodan Živojinović**	1963	–	(Socialist Federal Republic of Yugoslavia) Yugoslavia		1 Grand Slam doubles title → 1986 US Open champion, partnering Andrés Gómez • ranked doubles world no. 1 for 7 weeks in 1986

== See also ==
- List of male singles tennis players
- List of female tennis players
- Lists of tennis players
- Lists of sportspeople
