= 1895 U.S. National Championships – Men's singles =

Men's singles
- 1895 U.S. National Championships

Final
- Champion: (United States) Fred Hovey
- Runner-up: (United States) Robert Wrenn
- Score: 6–3, 6–2, 6–4

Events
Singles	men	women
Doubles	men	women
← 1894 ·	U.S. National Championships	· 1896 →

Fred Hovey defeated the two-time defending champion Robert Wrenn in the challenge round, 6–3, 6–2, 6–4 to win the men's singles tennis title at the 1895 U.S. National Championships.

Sixtееn-year-old Dwight F. Davis, who was to introduce the Davis Cup in 1900, took part in competition for the first time; he lost in the first round in four sets.

== Draw ==
=== Challenge round ===
Challenge round
(United States) R Wrenn	3	2	4
(United States) F Hovey	6	6	6

=== Finals ===
Quarterfinals
(United States) GC Hinckley	1	2	5
(United States) F Hovey	6	6	7
(United States) C Neel	6	6	6
(United States) M Chace	4	1	4
(United States) S Howland	6	2	6	6
(United States) CR Budlong	3	6	4	3
(United States) W Larned	6	6	3	6
(United States) AE Foote	3	4	6	1

Semifinals
(United States) F Hovey	6	6	6
(United States) C Neel	4	4	4
(United States) S Howland	5	6	1
(United States) W Larned	7	8	6

Final
(United States) F Hovey	6	9	6
(United States) W Larned	1	7	4

=== Earlier rounds ===
==== Section 1 ====
First round

Second round
(United States) C Bradley	2	3	0
(United States) GC Hinckley	6	6	6
JW Wear	8	6	6
(United States) CH Hatch	6	3	4
(United States) R Stevens
SL Smith	w/	o
(United States) A Taylor	4	2	6	3
M Baker	6	6	3	6

Third round
(United States) GC Hinckley	6	6	6
JW Wear	4	1	1
SL Smith	6	6	4	7
M Baker	3	0	6	5

Fourth round
(United States) GC Hinckley	6	5	1	6	6
SL Smith	3	7	6	2	3

==== Section 2 ====
First round

Second round
(United States) S Griffin	6	4	6	7
(United States) BS de Garmendia	3	6	2	5
(United States) F Hovey	6	6	3	6
WL Jennings	2	2	6	4
HB Bartow	9	6	7
(United States) R Sands	7	4	5
EA Crowninshield	6	5	6	7
(United States) J Hobart	2	7	2	5

Third round
(United States) S Griffin	2	0	1
(United States) F Hovey	6	6	6
HB Bartow	2	5	6	4
EA Crowninshield	6	7	3	6

Fourth round
(United States) F Hovey	2
EA Crowninshield	1	r

==== Section 3 ====
First round
B Needham	w/	o
(United States) D Miller

Second round
CF Waltz	6	6	3	6
(United States) E Stille	3	3	6	0
(United States) C Tete	2	2	0
(United States) JDE Jones	6	6	6
(United States) C Neel	3	7	6	6
(United States) H Avery	6	5	1	1
HC Clews	2	6	6	6
B Needham	6	3	3	1

Third round
CF Waltz	2	5	2
(United States) JDE Jones	6	7	6
(United States) C Neel	6	6	6
HC Clews	1	2	2

Fourth round
(United States) JDE Jones	6	6	4
(United States) C Neel	8	8	6

==== Section 4 ====
First round
(United States) J Talmage	6	6	4	6
FM Scudder	3	3	6	4
(United States) EP Fischer	w/	o
WE Brice
(United States) JC Davidson	9	4	6	6
(United States) D Davis	7	6	3	1
F Wise	7	6	7
(United States) G Herrick	5	4	5
GW Lee	6	6	6
AS Lewis	2	3	2
(United States) JA Hovey	4	6	2	6	7
FW Taylor	6	4	6	4	5
(United States) M Chace	6	6	6
(United States) CE Sands	2	3	4
VO Matthews	6	6	7
A Jones	3	4	5

Second round
(United States) J Talmage	4	4	4
(United States) EP Fischer	6	6	6
(United States) JC Davidson	6	6	3	4	6
F Wise	4	2	6	6	2
GW Lee	6	6	6
(United States) JA Hovey	4	1	1
(United States) M Chace	6	6	6
VO Matthews	0	2	1

Third round
(United States) EP Fischer	6	6	6
(United States) JC Davidson	2	0	2
GW Lee	4	5	7
(United States) M Chace	6	7	9

Fourth round
(United States) EP Fischer	3	4	4
(United States) M Chace	6	6	6

==== Section 5 ====
First round
(United States) A Codman	6	6	6
(United States) C Hale	2	1	3
(United States) AP Hawes	2	7	6	7	6
FM Pile	6	5	3	9	2
(United States) S Ward	6	6	6
(United States) WH Barnes	2	2	3
(United States) J Terry	4	7	4	6	6
JRB Willing	6	5	6	4	3
(United States) E Wrenn	6	6	6
NNH Lord	2	3	0
(United States) S Millett	6	5	6	7
(United States) R Davis	3	7	2	5
(United States) J Parmly Paret	6	6	7
G Beaman	1	4	5
(United States) S Howland	6	6	6
CW Brooks	3	1	2

Second round
(United States) A Codman	6	6	6
(United States) AP Hawes	0	3	4
(United States) S Ward	2	7	5	6
(United States) J Terry	6	5	7	3
(United States) E Wrenn	5	1	3
(United States) S Millett	7	6	6
(United States) J Parmly Paret	2	4	5
(United States) S Howland	6	6	7

Third round
(United States) A Codman	6	7	3	4	0
(United States) J Terry	4	5	6	6	6
(United States) S Millett	3	4	6	1
(United States) S Howland	6	6	1	6

Fourth round
(United States) J Terry	7	2	3
(United States) S Howland	9	6	6

==== Section 6 ====
First round
(United States) RH Palmer	6	6	3	1	6
W Herrick	4	3	6	6	3

Second round
(United States) RH Palmer	w/	o
F Butler
(United States) SA Cushman	0	3	3
(United States) J Ryerson	6	6	6
(United States) CC Stillman	5	2	2
(United States) S Reed	7	6	6
(United States) CR Budlong	w/	o
(United States) J Neely

Third round
(United States) RH Palmer	6	2	4	3
(United States) J Ryerson	3	6	6	6
(United States) S Reed	2	2	2
(United States) CR Budlong	6	6	6

Fourth round
(United States) J Ryerson	6	2	2	1
(United States) CR Budlong	4	6	6	6

==== Section 7 ====
First round

Second round
HF Robinson
(United States) A Thomson	w/	o
(United States) AWS Post	3	6	6	1	3
(United States) W Larned	6	4	2	6	6
(United States) SP Henshaw	4	6	2	6	6
(United States) HD Cleveland	6	2	6	2	3
(United States) WH Brown	w/	o
(United States) K McEnroe

Third round
(United States) A Thomson	2	3
(United States) W Larned	6	6
(United States) SP Henshaw	6	6	6
(United States) WH Brown	3	0	3

Fourth round
(United States) W Larned	6	6	6
(United States) SP Henshaw	0	0	1

==== Section 8 ====
First round

Second round
(United States) WG Herrick	2	1	2
(United States) LE Ware	6	6	6
(United States) W Boag	3	2	4
(United States) AL Williston	6	6	6
(United States) AE Foote	6	6	6	6
(United States) GL Wrenn	2	8	2	0
(United States) CA Gould	6	6	6
(United States) H Masson	2	3	3

Third round
(United States) LE Ware	6	6	6
(United States) AL Williston	2	2	2
(United States) AE Foote	6	6	6
(United States) CA Gould	2	1	2

Fourth round
(United States) LE Ware	6	4	0	10	6
(United States) AE Foote	4	6	6	6	8

Preceded by 1894 Wimbledon Championships – Men's Singles	Grand Slam men's singles	Succeeded by 1895 Wimbledon Championships – Men's singles
