= 1896 U.S. National Championships – Men's singles =

Men's singles
- 1896 U.S. National Championships

Final
- Champion: (United States) Robert Wrenn
- Runner-up: (United States) Fred Hovey
- Score: 7–5, 3–6, 6–0, 1–6, 6–1

Events
| Singles | men | women |
| Doubles | men | women |
| ← 1895 · | U.S. National Championships | · 1897 → |

Robert Wrenn defeated the defending champion Fred Hovey in a rematch of the previous year's final, 7–5, 3–6, 6–0, 1–6, 6–1 to win the men's singles tennis title at the 1896 U.S. National Championships.

Future champions Malcolm Whitman, William Clothier and Holcombe Ward made their debuts at the tournament this year.

== Draw ==
=== Challenge round ===
| Challenge round |
| (United States) F Hovey | 5 | 6 | 0 | 6 | 1 |
| (United States) R Wrenn | 7 | 3 | 6 | 1 | 6 |

=== Finals ===
Semifinals
(United States) C Neel | 6 | 12 | 6 | 4 | 1
(United States) R Wrenn | 2 | 14 | 4 | 6 | 6
(United States) W Larned | 6 | 6 | 6
(United States) EP Fischer | 1 | 2 | 1

Final
(United States) R Wrenn | 4 | 3 | 6 | 6 | 6
(United States) W Larned | 6 | 6 | 4 | 4 | 3

=== Earlier rounds ===
==== Section 1 ====
First round
(United States) CR Budlong | 7 | 6 | 6
(United States) AWS Post | 5 | 4 | 2
(United States) R Stevens | 6 | 6 | 6
(United States) WC Grant | 2 | 3 | 3
(United States) GH Miles | 8 | 6 | 6
(United States) RH Palmer | 6 | 1 | 1

Second round
(United States) C Neel | 6 | 6 | 6
(United States) JR Carpenter | 1 | 2 | 2
(United States) E Lynman | 6 | 5 | 3 | 7 | 3
(United States) C Cragin | 3 | 7 | 6 | 5 | 6
EB Stevens | 2 | 1 | 1
(United States) CR Budlong | 6 | 6 | 6
(United States) R Stevens | 6 | 6 | 6
(United States) GH Miles | 4 | 1 | 4

Third round
(United States) C Neel | 6 | 6 | 6
(United States) C Cragin | 4 | 2 | 4
(United States) CR Budlong | 4 | 6 | 4 | 4
(United States) R Stevens | 6 | 0 | 6 | 6

Quarterfinals
(United States) C Neel | 6 | 6 | 7 | 9
(United States) R Stevens | 4 | 0 | 9 | 7

==== Section 2 ====
First round
CM Pope | 9 | 7 | 6
(United States) HD Cleveland | 7 | 5 | 2
(United States) J Parmly Paret | w/ | o
C Cordier
(United States) AP Hawes | 6 | 4 | 6 | 6
(United States) J McL Walton | 1 | 6 | 3 | 2
(United States) GL Wrenn | 6 | 6 | 6
(United States) LH Turner | 1 | 1 | 2
(United States) CA Gould | 2 | 6 | 7 | 6
(United States) H Avery | 6 | 2 | 5 | 3
(United States) E Wrenn | 6 | 6 | 6
(United States) W Clothier | 1 | 2 | 0
(United States) R Wrenn | 7 | 3 | 6 | 6 | 6
N.Perry E. Halliwell | 9 | 6 | 1 | 1 | 3
(United States) D Davis | 6 | 6 | 6
(United States) JC Davidson | 4 | 3 | 2

Second round
CM Pope | 3 | 2 | 3
(United States) J Parmly Paret | 6 | 6 | 6
(United States) AP Hawes | 4 | 9 | 4 | 1
(United States) GL Wrenn | 6 | 7 | 6 | 6
(United States) CA Gould | 0 | 1 | 0
(United States) E Wrenn | 6 | 6 | 6
(United States) R Wrenn | 6 | 6 | 9 | 6
(United States) D Davis | 1 | 8 | 7 | 2

Third round
(United States) J Parmly Paret | 1 | 0 | 3
(United States) GL Wrenn | 6 | 6 | 6
(United States) E Wrenn | 4 | 4 | 10
(United States) R Wrenn | 6 | 6 | 12

Quarterfinals
(United States) GL Wrenn | 6 | 7 | 5 | 7
(United States) R Wrenn | 2 | 9 | 7 | 9

==== Section 3 ====
First round
(United States) E Stille | 9 | 6 | 4 | 6
(United States) S Ward | 7 | 2 | 6 | 2
(United States) W Larned | 6 | 6 | 6
(United States) D Miller | 4 | 3 | 3
GW Lee | 3 | 6 | 6 | 6 | 6
WA Bethel | 6 | 4 | 4 | 8 | 3
JK Willing | w/ | o
(United States) A Thomson
(United States) MD Whitman | 6 | 6 | 6
(United States) J Talmage | 1 | 4 | 3
(United States) C Cleveland | 6 | 8 | 6
A Von Leslie | 4 | 6 | 0
(United States) H Ward | 6 | 6 | 6
(United States) LJ Grant | 1 | 3 | 2
(United States) R Davis | 6 | 6 | 6
WW Reece | 3 | 1 | 3

Second round
(United States) E Stille | 3 | 4 | 6
(United States) W Larned | 6 | 6 | 8
GW Lee | 6 | 8 | 6
JK Willing | 3 | 6 | 2
(United States) MD Whitman | 6 | 6 | 6
(United States) C Cleveland | 0 | 2 | 0
(United States) H Ward | 2 | 8 | 4 | 6 | 6
(United States) R Davis | 6 | 6 | 6 | 4 | 2

Third round
(United States) W Larned | 6 | 6 | 6
GW Lee | 4 | 2 | 4
(United States) MD Whitman | 6 | 6 | 6
(United States) H Ward | 3 | 2 | 0

Quarterfinals
(United States) W Larned | 6 | 6 | 6
(United States) MD Whitman | 4 | 1 | 2

==== Section 4 ====
First round
(United States) G Sheldon | 7 | 6 | 8
(United States) K Horton | 5 | 3 | 6
(United States) J Neely | 4 | 6 | 6 | 9
RT Parke | 6 | 1 | 2 | 7
(United States) LE Ware | 6 | 8 | 6
(United States) R Fincke | 1 | 6 | 2

Second round
(United States) G Sheldon | 4 | 6 | 6 | 6
(United States) J Neely | 6 | 2 | 4 | 2
(United States) LE Ware | 6 | 6 | 6
YM Edwards | 2 | 0 | 3
(United States) WD Brownell
(United States) RH Carleton | w/ | o
(United States) W Jordan | 1 | 3 | 2
(United States) EP Fischer | 6 | 6 | 6

Third round
(United States) G Sheldon | 6 | 6 | 6 | 3 | 3
(United States) LE Ware | 1 | 8 | 4 | 6 | 6
(United States) RH Carleton | 3 | 6 | 1
(United States) EP Fischer | 6 | 8 | 6

Quarterfinals
(United States) G Sheldon | 4 | 5 | 6 | 6
(United States) EP Fischer | 6 | 7 | 2 | 8

| Preceded by 1895 Wimbledon Championships – Men's Singles | Grand Slam men's singles | Succeeded by 1896 Wimbledon Championships – Men's singles |
