= Arthur E. Foote =

American tennis player

- Full name: Arthur Ellsworth Foote
- Country (sports): United States
- Born: January 3, 1874; New Haven, Connecticut
- Died: August 27, 1946; Englewood, New Jersey
- Turned pro: 1891 (amateur tour)
- Retired: 1899
- College: Yale

Singles

Grand Slam singles results
- Wimbledon: 2R (1896)
- US Open: QF (1895)

Arthur Ellsworth Foote (January 3, 1874 – August 27, 1946) was an American tennis player active in the late 19th century.

He was born in New Haven, Connecticut, the son of Sherman Frisbie Foote and his wife, Mary Hutton Rice. He attended Hillhouse High School in New Haven, and Phillips-Andover, and was graduated from Yale College with a B.A. in 1896. As an undergraduate, he won university tennis tournaments in singles and doubles in 1893, 1894, and 1895. In 1893 he was ranked 8th among U.S. tennis players and in 9th place in 1894. Foote reached the quarterfinals of the U.S. National Championships in 1895.

After graduation he established his own advertising firm. He served as a major in the U.S. Army in World War I, stationed in Washington, D.C., and was placed in charge of all Army post exchanges. After the war he served in the War Department, the American Red Cross, and the Department of Commerce, retiring in 1931.

On May 5, 1900, in New Haven, he married Edith Burr Palmer. They had three children, Ray Palmer Foote, Margaret Ellsworth Foote, and Alfred Sherman Foote.

He died of a coronary occlusion at his home in Englewood, New Jersey, and was buried at Grove Street Cemetery in New Haven.
