= 1896 U.S. National Championships (tennis) =

- Date: August 17–26 (M); June 17–20 (W)
- Edition: 16th
- Category: Grand Slam
- Surface: Grass
- Location: Newport, R.I., United States (M); Philadelphia, PA, United States (W)

Champions

Men's singles
- (United States) Robert Wrenn

Women's singles
- (United States) Elisabeth Moore

Men's doubles
- (United States) Carr Neel / (United States) Sam Neel

Women's doubles
- (United States) Elisabeth Moore / (United States) Juliette Atkinson

Mixed doubles
- (United States) Juliette Atkinson / (United States) Edwin P. Fischer
- U.S. National Championships

The 1896 U.S. National Championships (now known as the US Open) was a tennis tournament that took place in June and August of 1896. The women's tournament was held from June 17 to June 20 on the outdoor grass courts at the Philadelphia Cricket Club in Philadelphia, Pennsylvania. The men's tournament was held from August 17 to August 26 on the outdoor grass courts at the Newport Casino in Newport, Rhode Island. It was the 16th U.S. National Championships and the second Grand Slam tournament of the year.

== Finals ==
=== Men's singles ===
(United States) Robert Wrenn defeated (United States) Fred Hovey 7–5, 3–6, 6–0, 1–6, 6–1

=== Women's singles ===
(United States) Elisabeth Moore defeated (United States) Juliette Atkinson 6–4, 4–6, 6–2, 6–2

=== Men's doubles ===
(United States) Carr Neel / (United States) Sam Neel defeated (United States) Robert Wrenn / (United States) Malcolm Chace 6–3, 1–6, 6–1, 3–6, 6–1

=== Women's doubles ===
(United States) Elisabeth Moore / (United States) Juliette Atkinson defeated (United States) Annabella Wistar / (United States) Amy Williams 6–3, 9–7

=== Mixed doubles ===
(United States) Juliette Atkinson / (United States) Edwin P. Fischer defeated (United States) Amy Williams / (United States) Mantle Fielding 6–2, 6–3, 6–3

Preceded by 1896 Wimbledon Championships	Grand Slams	Succeeded by 1897 Wimbledon Championships
