= R. Stanley Howland =

American tennis player

Stanley Howland
- Full name: R. Stanley Howland
- Country (sports): United States
- Born: c.1875
- Died: 1942

Singles

Grand Slam singles results
- US Open: SF (1895)

R. Stanley Howland (c.1875 – 1942) was an American tennis player active in the late 19th century and early 20th century.

== Tennis career ==
Howland reached the semifinals of the U.S. National Championships in 1895.

Howland died in 1942 at the age of 67.
