= 1896 U.S. National Championships – Women's singles =

Women's singles
- 1896 U.S. National Championships

Final
- Champion: (United States) Elisabeth Moore
- Runner-up: (United States) Juliette Atkinson
- Score: 6–4, 4–6, 6–2, 6–2

Details
- Draw: 13 + CR
- Seeds: –

Events
Singles	men	women
Doubles	men	women
- U.S. National Championships

Elisabeth Moore won the singles tennis title by defeating reigning champion Juliette Atkinson 6–4, 4–6, 6–2, 6–2 in the Challenge Round of the 1896 U.S. Women's National Singles Championship. Moore had won the right to challenge Atkinson by defeating Annabella Wistar 6–3, 7–5, 6–0 in the final of the All Comers' competition. The event was played on outdoor grass courts and held at the Philadelphia Cricket Club in Wissahickon Heights, Chestnut Hill, Philadelphia from June 17 through June 20, 1896.

== Draw ==
=== Challenge round ===
Challenge Round
(United States) Juliette Atkinson	4	6	2	2
(United States) Elisabeth Moore	6	4	6	6

=== All Comers' finals ===
Quarterfinals
(United States) Elisabeth Moore	6	6
(United States) Amy Williams	4	5
(United States) Gertrude Kimball	6	6
(United States) Kathleen Atkinson	5	1
(United States) Annabella Wistar	6	6
(United States) Grace Booth	2	1
(United States) Edith Rotch	6	6
(United States) Helen Booth	3	2

Semifinals
(United States) Elisabeth Moore	6	6
(United States) Gertrude Kimball	3	1
(United States) Annabella Wistar	6	6
(United States) Edith Rotch	4	2

Finals
(United States) Elisabeth Moore	6	7	6
(United States) Annabella Wistar	3	5	0

Preceded by 1896 Wimbledon Championships – Women's singles	Grand Slam women's singles	Succeeded by 1897 Wimbledon Championships – Women's singles
