= Carr Neel =

American tennis player

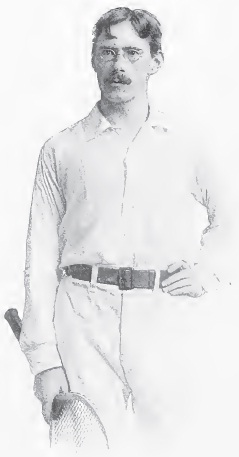
- Full name: Carr Baker Neel
- Country (sports): United States
- Born: October 30, 1873; St. Louis, Missouri, U.S.
- Died: March 2, 1949 (aged 75); Santa Clara, California, U.S.
- Plays: Right-handed (one-handed backhand)

Singles

Grand Slam singles results
- US Open: SF (1895, 1896)

Doubles

Grand Slam doubles results
- US Open: W (1896)

Carr Baker Neel (1873-1949) was an American male tennis player who was active in the late 19th century.

== Tennis career ==
In 1896 Carr Neel won the men's doubles title at the U.S. National Championships. Together with his brother Sam Neel they were victorious over defending champions Robert Wrenn and Malcolm Chace.

In 1896 he won the Western Tennis Championship beating George Wrenn in the final. In 1899 he again won the tournament by defeating John Allen in the final and winning against Kreigh Collins in the challenge round. They were the first Californians to win a title at the U.S. Championships.

Neel was a double winner of the Niagara International Tennis Tournament. He won the title in 1895 and successfully defended it in the 1896 Challenge Round against Fritz K. Ward in straight sets.

== Grand Slam finals ==
=== Doubles (1 titles, 1 runner-up) ===
Result	Year	Championship	Surface	Partner	Opponents	Score
Loss	1894	U.S. Championships	Grass	(United States) Sam Neel	(United States) Clarence Hobart (United States) Fred Hovey	3–6, 6–8, 1–6
Win	1896	U.S. Championships	Grass	(United States) Sam Neel	(United States) Malcolm Chance (United States) Robert Wrenn	6–3, 1–6, 6–1, 3–6, 6–1
