= Sam Neel =

American tennis player (1875–1947)

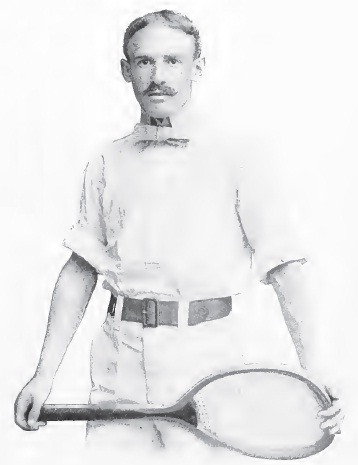
- Full name: Samuel Ritchie Neel
- Country (sports): United States
- Born: December 26, 1875 Montana, U.S.
- Died: May 9, 1947 (aged 71) Los Angeles, California, U.S.
- Plays: Right-handed (one-handed backhand)

Doubles

Grand Slam doubles results
- US Open: W (1896)

Samuel Ritchie Neel (1875-1947) was an American male tennis player who was active in the late 19th century.

In 1896, Neel won the men's doubles title at the U.S. National Championships with his brother Carr Neel, defeating defending champions Robert Wrenn and Malcolm Chace. The pair also reached the final in 1894. In singles, Neel reached the semifinals of the Western States Championships in 1899.

== Grand Slam finals ==
=== Doubles (1 titles, 1 runner-up) ===
Result	Year	Championship	Surface	Partner	Opponents	Score
Loss	1894	U.S. Championships	Grass	(United States) Carr Neel	(United States) Clarence Hobart (United States) Fred Hovey	3–6, 6–8, 1–6
Win	1896	U.S. Championships	Grass	(United States) Carr Neel	(United States) Malcolm Chance (United States) Robert Wrenn	6–3, 1–6, 6–1, 3–6, 6–1
