= Robert Wrenn =

American tennis player (1873–1925)

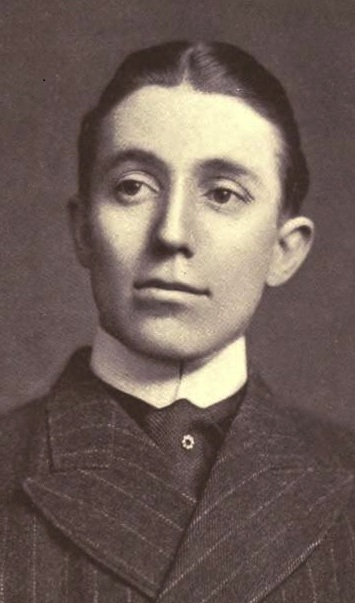
- Wrenn in 1900
- Full name: Robert Duffield Wrenn
- Country (sports): United States
- Born: September 20, 1873 Highland Park, Illinois, U.S.
- Died: November 12, 1925 (aged 52) Manhattan, New York City, U.S.
- Retired: 1903
- Plays: Left-handed (one-handed backhand)
- Int. Tennis HoF: 1955 (member page)

Singles
- Career record: 111–40 (70.5%)
- Career titles: 11
- Highest ranking: No. 1 (1897, ITHF)

Grand Slam singles results
- US Open: W (1893, 1894, 1896, 1897)

Doubles

Grand Slam doubles results
- US Open: W (1895)

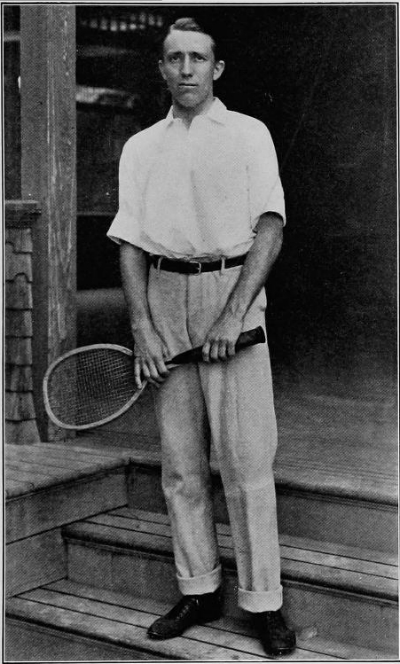
Robert "Bob" Wrenn

Robert Duffield Wrenn (September 20, 1873 – November 12, 1925) was an American left-handed tennis player, four-time U.S. singles championship winner, and one of the first inductees in the International Tennis Hall of Fame.

== Early life and education ==
Wrenn was born in Highland Park, Illinois. Wrenn attended Harvard University, where he was a prominent quarterback on the football team. Wrenn was considered "one of Harvard's greatest all-around athletes," a star player at football, ice hockey, and baseball.

Wrenn played a small role in the formation of college ice hockey in the United States. In the fall of 1892, Wrenn and fellow tennis champion (and doubles partner) Malcolm Greene Chace played in an international tennis tournament in Niagara Falls, New York, where they met some Canadian athletes who invited them to return the next winter to learn about their sport of ice hockey, which differed from the game of ice polo which was then played in American colleges. Wrenn and Chace gathered some friends from other northeast colleges including Cornell University and returned to Canada over Christmas break 1894-95 for a series of hockey matches. Each of the students returned to their respective campuses to promote the sport of ice hockey. Wrenn later played for the St. Nicholas Hockey Club.

Wrenn won his tennis titles in 1893, 1894, 1896 and 1897 (losing out to Fred Hovey in 1895).

== Career ==
In 1898, he served in Cuba with Theodore Roosevelt's Rough Riders in the Spanish–American War. He contracted yellow fever while in Cuba.

Wrenn played for the U.S. Davis Cup team in 1903 together with his brother George. In the final against the British Isles at the Longwood Cricket Club, they were defeated 1–4 and Wrenn lost both his singles matches against Reginald and Laurence Doherty as well as the doubles against the Doherty brothers.

Wrenn was vice-president of the United States Tennis Association from 1902 until 1911 and president from 1912 until 1915. He was inducted into the Hall of Fame in 1955.

He was arrested in 1914 when the car he was driving ran over and killed Herbert George Loveday, the choir director of St Mary's Church in Tuxedo Park, New York. Wrenn was exonerated when, according to a May 21, 1914 article in The New York Times, "the Grand Jury, finding from testimony that the mechanism of the car had become disarranged, and the steering gear powerless, declined to find an indictment, and the complaint was dismissed."

Wrenn was an aviator in World War I.

== Death ==
Wrenn died of Bright's disease in his apartment in the Hotel Madison in Manhattan, at age 52.

== Grand Slam finals ==
=== Singles (4 titles, 1 runner-up) ===
Result	Year	Championship	Surface	Opponent	Score
Win	1893	U.S. Championships	Grass	(United States) Fred Hovey	6–4, 3–6, 6–4, 6–4
Win	1894	U.S. Championships	Grass	(United Kingdom) Manliffe Goodbody	6–8, 6–1, 6–4, 6–4
Loss	1895	U.S. Championships	Grass	(United States) Fred Hovey	3–6, 2–6, 4–6
Win	1896	U.S. Championships	Grass	(United States) Fred Hovey	7–5, 3–6, 6–0, 1–6, 6–1
Win	1897	U.S. Championships	Grass	(United Kingdom) Wilberforce Eaves	4–6, 8–6, 6–3, 2–6, 6–2

=== Doubles (1 title, 1 runner-up) ===
Result	Year	Championship	Surface	Partner	Opponents	Score
Win	1895	U.S. Championships	Grass	(United States) Malcolm Chace	(United States) Clarence Hobart (United States) Fred Hovey	7–5, 6–1, 8–6
Loss	1896	U.S. Championships	Grass	(United States) Malcolm Chace	(United States) Carr Neel (United States) Sam Neel	3–6, 6–1, 1–6, 6–3, 1–6
