= Frederick Hovey =

American tennis player

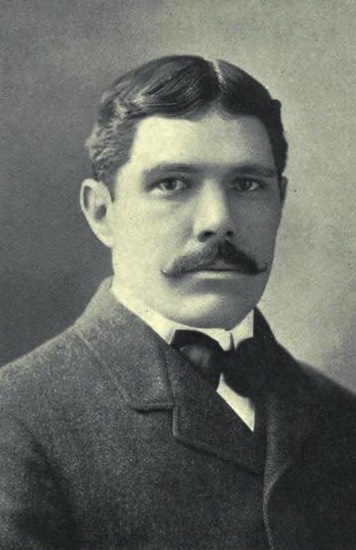
- Full name: Frederick Howard Hovey
- Country (sports): United States
- Born: October 7, 1868; Newton Centre, MA, U.S.
- Died: October 18, 1945 (aged 77); Miami Beach, FL, U.S.
- Plays: Right-handed (one-handed backhand)
- Int. Tennis HoF: 1974 (member page)

Singles
- Career record: 121–42 (74.23%)
- Career titles: 20
- Highest ranking: 1

Grand Slam singles results
- US Open: W (1895)

Doubles

Grand Slam doubles results
- US Open: W (1893, 1894)

Frederick Howard Hovey (October 7, 1868 – October 18, 1945) was a former World No 1 American tennis player.

== Biography ==
Hovey was born on October 7, 1868, in Newton Centre, Massachusetts. His brother was George Rice Hovey, and his father was Alvah Hovey.

Hovey won the NCAA men's singles championship in 1890 while attending Harvard University.

In 1893 Hovey won the men's doubles title at the U.S. National Championships with his partner Clarence Hobart with a victory over Oliver Campbell and Robert Huntington. In 1895 he won the men's title at the U.S. National Championships after defeating Robert Wrenn in three straight sets in the Challenge Round. That same year Hovey was ranked No. 1 in the United States.

He died on October 18, 1945, in Miami Beach, Florida. In 1974, Hovey was inducted into the International Tennis Hall of Fame posthumously.

== Grand Slam finals ==
=== Singles (1 title, 2 runners-up) ===
Result	Year	Championship	Surface	Opponent	Score
Loss	1892	U.S. Championships	Grass	(United States) Oliver Campbell	5–7, 6–3, 3–6, 5–7
Win	1895	U.S. Championships	Grass	(United States) Robert Wrenn	6–3, 6–2, 6–4
Loss	1896	U.S. Championships	Grass	(United States) Robert Wrenn	5–7, 6–3, 0–6, 6–1, 1–6

=== Doubles (2 titles, 1 runner-up) ===
Result	Year	Championship	Surface	Partner	Opponents	Score
Win	1893	U.S. Championships	Grass	(United States) Clarence Hobart	(United States) Oliver Campbell (United States) Robert Huntington	6–3, 6–4, 4–6, 6–2
Win	1894	U.S. Championships	Grass	(United States) Clarence Hobart	(United States) Carr Neel (United States) Sam Neel	6–3, 8–6, 6–1
Loss	1895	U.S. Championships	Grass	(United States) Clarence Hobart	(United States) Malcolm Chace (United States) Robert Wrenn	5–7, 1–6, 6–8
