= List of Grand Slam men's doubles champions =

Men's doubles championships at tennis's Grand Slam tournaments were first contested at the 1881 U.S. National Championships. Ken McGregor and Frank Sedgman are the only doubles players and team to achieve a calendar year Grand Slam, doing so in 1951, (the Bryans won four consecutive majors, but over the course of two calendar years), and their seven consecutive major titles remain the longest title streak in men's doubles major history.

A total of six players have a completed the career Golden Slam by winning all four majors and an Olympic gold medal during their respective careers: Bob Bryan, Mike Bryan (the Bryan brothers), Daniel Nestor, Mate Pavić, Todd Woodbridge and Mark Woodforde ("The Woodies"). All of them except Mate Pavić also achieved the Career Super Slam, by achieving a Career Golden Slam and winning a Year-End Championship in their careers.

Ken McGregor and Frank Sedgman — The only men's doubles team to win the Grand Slam.

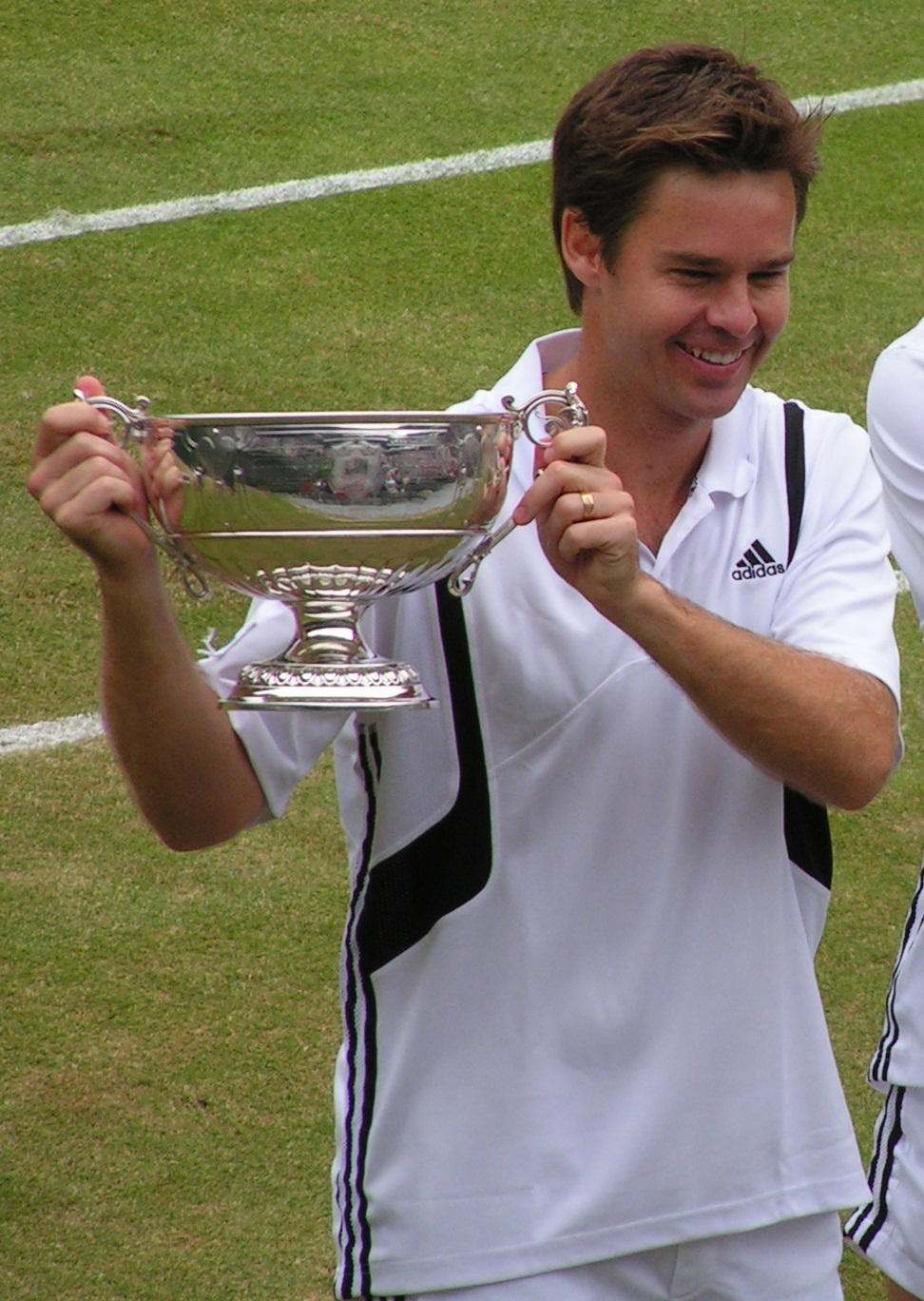
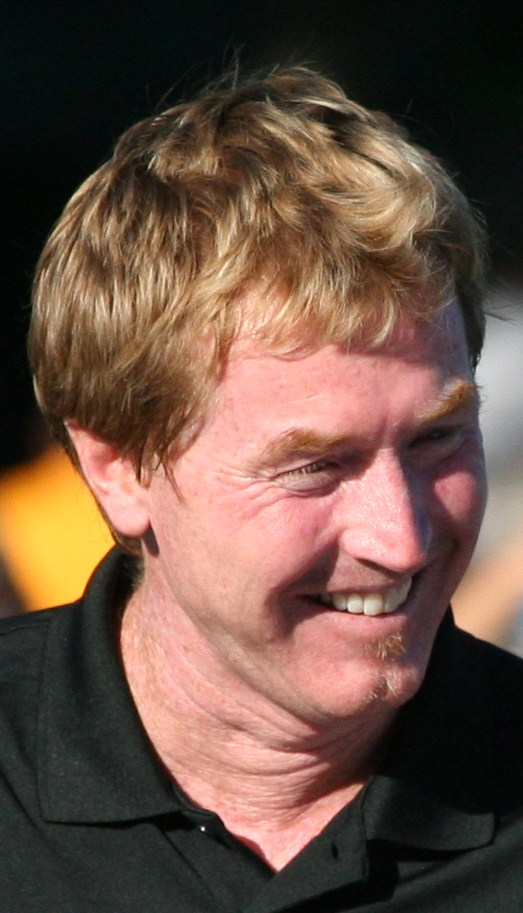
Todd Woodbridge and Mark Woodforde – The first team to complete the Career Super Slam.

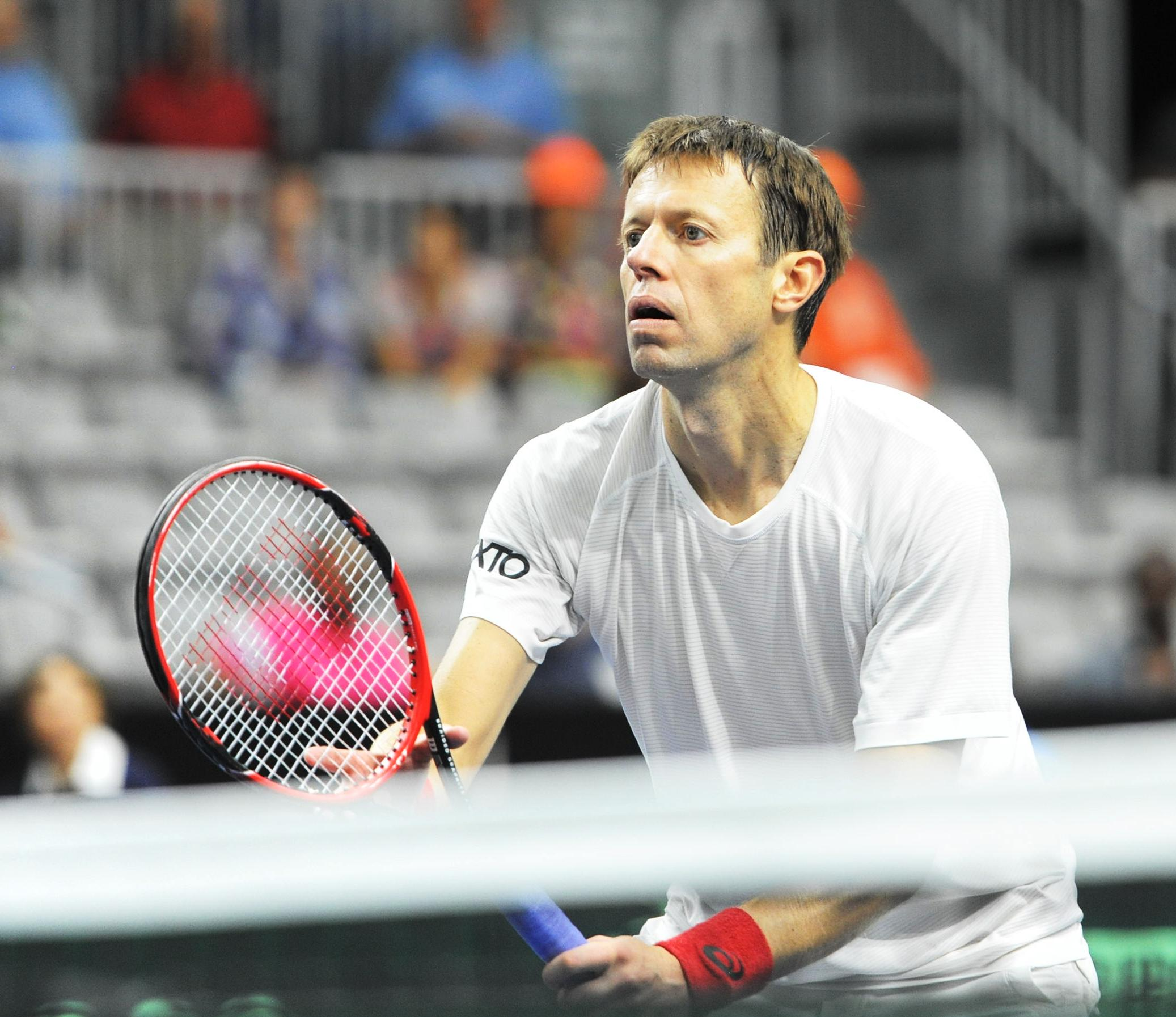
Daniel Nestor — One of five players to complete the Career Super Slam.

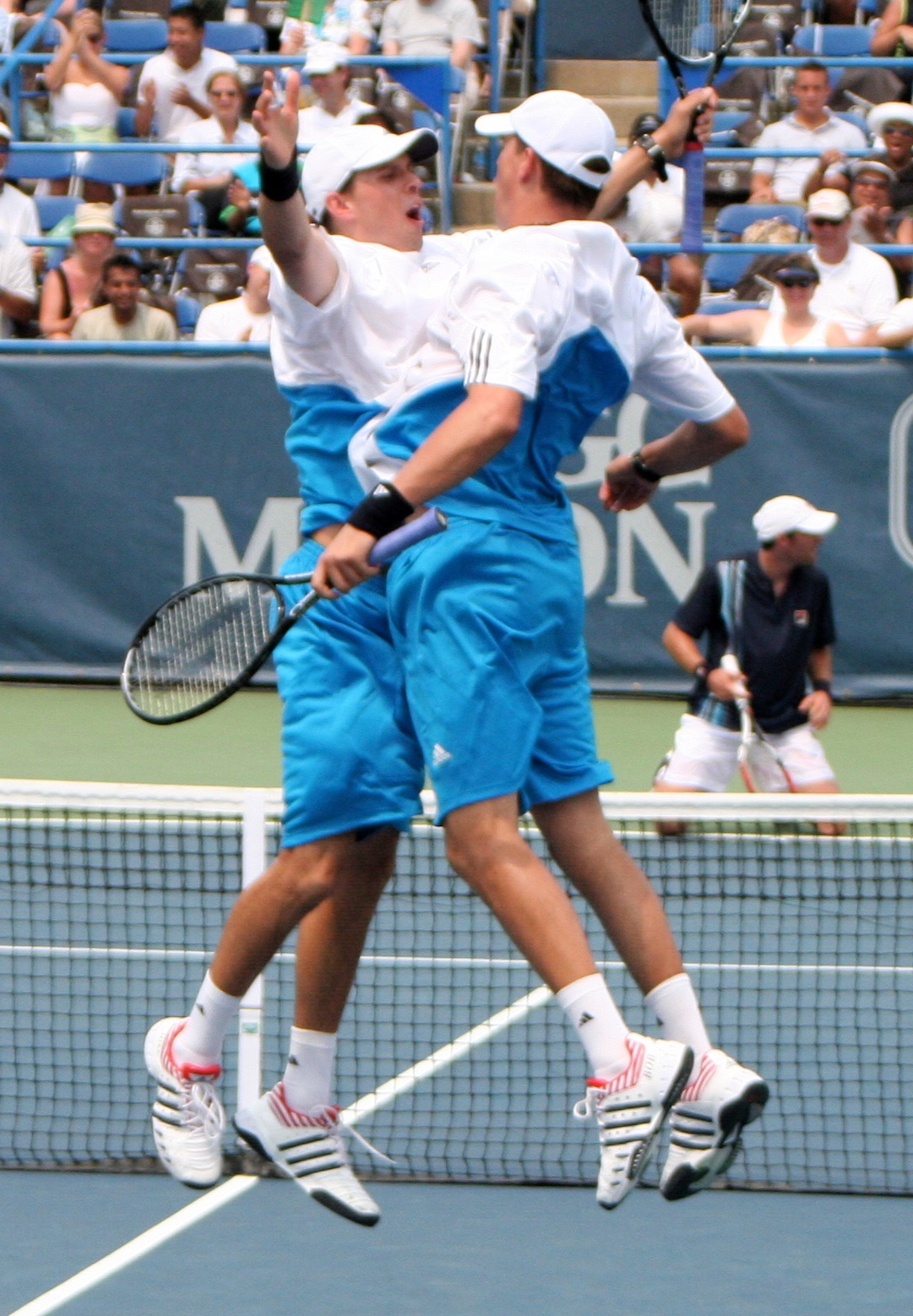
Mike Bryan and Bob Bryan — Only the second team to win all four majors in a row, and the most successful men's doubles team of all-time (16 major titles together).

== Champions by year ==
* French club members or citizens only, thus not yet a Grand Slam
tournament (until 1925 when the tournament opened itself to international
competitors after merging with the World Hard Court Championships).
† Australian Open held in December.
†† Renamed from Australasian Championships to Australian Championships.
††† French Open was held in September 2020 due to the coronavirus pandemic.

Tournament surface
AU	Hard (1988–Present); Grass (1905–1987)
FR	Clay
WB	Grass
US	Hard (1978–Present); Clay (1975–1977); Grass (1881–1974)
Flag Icon Key
List of National Flags

Year	Australian Open	French Open*	Wimbledon	US Open
1881	started in 1905	started in 1925	started in 1884	(United States) Clarence Clark (1/1) (United States) Fred Taylor (1/1)
1882	tournament not created	tournament not created	tournament not created	(United States) Richard Sears (1/6) (United States) James Dwight (1/5)
1883	tournament not created	tournament not created	tournament not created	(United States) Richard Sears (2/6) (United States) James Dwight (2/5)
1884	tournament not created	tournament not created	(United Kingdom) Ernest Renshaw (1/5) (United Kingdom) William Renshaw (1/5)	(United States) Richard Sears (3/6) (United States) James Dwight (3/5)
1885	tournament not created	tournament not created	(United Kingdom) Ernest Renshaw (2/5) (United Kingdom) William Renshaw (2/5)	(United States) Richard Sears (4/6) (United States) Joseph S. Clark (1/1)
1886	tournament not created	tournament not created	(United Kingdom) Ernest Renshaw (3/5) (United Kingdom) William Renshaw (3/5)	(United States) Richard Sears (5/6) (United States) James Dwight (4/5)
1887	tournament not created	tournament not created	(United Kingdom) Herbert Wilberforce (1/1) (United Kingdom) Patrick Bowes-Lyon (1/1)	(United States) Richard Sears (6/6) (United States) James Dwight (5/5)
1888	tournament not created	tournament not created	(United Kingdom) Ernest Renshaw (4/5) (United Kingdom) William Renshaw (4/5)	(United States) Oliver Campbell (1/3) (United States) Valentine Hall (1/2)
1889	tournament not created	tournament not created	(United Kingdom) Ernest Renshaw (5/5) (United Kingdom) William Renshaw (5/5)	(United States) Henry Slocum Jr. (1/1) (United States) Howard Taylor (1/1)
1890	tournament not created	tournament not created	(United Kingdom) Joshua Pim (1/2) (United Kingdom) Frank Stoker (1/2)	(United States) Valentine Hall (2/2) (United States) Clarence Hobart (1/3)
1891	tournament not created	tournament not created	(United Kingdom) Herbert Baddeley (1/4) (United Kingdom) Wilfred Baddeley (1/4)	(United States) Oliver Campbell (2/3) (United States) Robert Huntington (1/2)
1892	tournament not created	tournament not created	(United Kingdom) Ernest Lewis (1/1) (United Kingdom) Harry S. Barlow (1/1)	(United States) Oliver Campbell (3/3) (United States) Robert Huntington (2/2)
1893	tournament not created	tournament not created	(United Kingdom) Joshua Pim (2/2) (United Kingdom) Frank Stoker (2/2)	(United States) Clarence Hobart (2/3) (United States) Fred Hovey (1/2)
1894	tournament not created	tournament not created	(United Kingdom) Herbert Baddeley (2/4) (United Kingdom) Wilfred Baddeley (2/4)	(United States) Clarence Hobart (3/3) (United States) Fred Hovey (2/2)
1895	tournament not created	tournament not created	(United Kingdom) Herbert Baddeley (3/4) (United Kingdom) Wilfred Baddeley (3/4)	(United States) Malcolm Chace (1/1) (United States) Robert Wrenn (1/1)
1896	tournament not created	tournament not created	(United Kingdom) Herbert Baddeley (4/4) (United Kingdom) Wilfred Baddeley (4/4)	(United States) Carr Neel (1/1) (United States) Samuel Neel (1/1)
1897	tournament not created	tournament not created	(United Kingdom) Laurence Doherty (1/10) (United Kingdom) Reginald Doherty (1/10)	(United States) Leo Ware (1/2) (United States) George Sheldon Jr. (1/2)
1898	tournament not created	tournament not created	(United Kingdom) Laurence Doherty (2/10) (United Kingdom) Reginald Doherty (2/10)	(United States) Leo Ware (2/2) (United States) George Sheldon Jr. (2/2)
1899	tournament not created	tournament not created	(United Kingdom) Laurence Doherty (3/10) (United Kingdom) Reginald Doherty (3/10)	(United States) Holcombe Ward (1/6) (United States) Dwight Davis (1/3)
1900	tournament not created	tournament not created	(United Kingdom) Laurence Doherty (4/10) (United Kingdom) Reginald Doherty (4/10)	(United States) Holcombe Ward (2/6) (United States) Dwight Davis (2/3)
1901	tournament not created	tournament not created	(United Kingdom) Laurence Doherty (5/10) (United Kingdom) Reginald Doherty (5/10)	(United States) Holcombe Ward (3/6) (United States) Dwight Davis (3/3)
1902	tournament not created	tournament not created	(United Kingdom) Sydney Smith (1/2) (United Kingdom) Frank Riseley (1/2)	(United Kingdom) Laurence Doherty (6/10) (United Kingdom) Reginald Doherty (6/10)
1903	tournament not created	tournament not created	(United Kingdom) Laurence Doherty (7/10) (United Kingdom) Reginald Doherty (7/10)	(United Kingdom) Laurence Doherty (8/10) (United Kingdom) Reginald Doherty (8/10)
1904	tournament not created	tournament not created	(United Kingdom) Laurence Doherty (9/10) (United Kingdom) Reginald Doherty (9/10)	(United States) Holcombe Ward (4/6) (United States) Beals Wright (1/3)
1905	(United Kingdom) Randolph Lycett (1/5) (Australia) Tom Tachell (1/1)	tournament not created	(United Kingdom) Laurence Doherty (10/10) (United Kingdom) Reginald Doherty (10/10)	(United States) Holcombe Ward (5/6) (United States) Beals Wright (2/3)
1906	(Australia) Rodney Heath (1/2) (New Zealand) Anthony Wilding (1/5)	tournament not created	(United Kingdom) Sydney Smith (2/2) (United Kingdom) Frank Riseley (2/2)	(United States) Holcombe Ward (6/6) (United States) Beals Wright (3/3)
1907	(Australia) Bill Gregg (1/1) (New Zealand) Harry Parker (1/1)	tournament not created	(Australia) Norman Brookes (1/4) (New Zealand) Anthony Wilding (2/5)	(United States) Fred Alexander (1/6) (United States) Harold Hackett (1/4)
1908	(United States) Fred Alexander (2/6) (Australia) Alfred Dunlop (1/1)	tournament not created	(United Kingdom) M. J. G. Ritchie (1/2) (New Zealand) Anthony Wilding (3/5)	(United States) Fred Alexander (3/6) (United States) Harold Hackett (2/4)
1909	(Australia) J. P. Keane (1/1) (Australia) Ernie Parker (1/2)	tournament not created	(United Kingdom) Herbert Roper Barrett (1/3) (United Kingdom) Arthur Gore (1/1)	(United States) Fred Alexander (4/6) (United States) Harold Hackett (3/4)
1910	(Australia) Ashley Campbell (1/2) (Australia) Horace Rice (1/2)	tournament not created	(United Kingdom) M. J. G. Ritchie (2/2) (New Zealand) Anthony Wilding (4/5)	(United States) Fred Alexander (5/6) (United States) Harold Hackett (4/4)
1911	(Australia) Rodney Heath (2/2) (United Kingdom) Randolph Lycett (2/5)	tournament not created	(France) Max Decugis (1/1) (France) André Gobert (1/1)	(United States) Raymond Little (1/1) (United States) Gustave Touchard (1/1)
1912	(United Kingdom) James Cecil Parke (1/1) (United Kingdom) Charles Dixon (1/3)	tournament not created	(United Kingdom) Herbert Roper Barrett (2/3) (United Kingdom) Charles Dixon (2/3)	(United States) Maurice McLoughlin (1/3) (United States) Thomas Bundy (1/3)
1913	(Australia) Alf Hedeman (1/1) (Australia) Ernie Parker (2/2)	tournament not created	(United Kingdom) Herbert Roper Barrett (3/3) (United Kingdom) Charles Dixon (3/3)	(United States) Maurice McLoughlin (2/3) (United States) Thomas Bundy (2/3)
1914	(Australia) Ashley Campbell (2/2) (Australia) Gerald Patterson (1/6)	tournament not created	(Australia) Norman Brookes (2/4) (New Zealand) Anthony Wilding (5/5)	(United States) Maurice McLoughlin (3/3) (United States) Thomas Bundy (3/3)
1915	(Australia) Horace Rice (2/2) (Australia) Clarence Todd (1/1)	tournament not created	World War I	(United States) William Johnston (1/3) (United States) Clarence Griffin (1/3)
1916	World War I	tournament not created	World War I	(United States) William Johnston (2/3) (United States) Clarence Griffin (2/3)
1917	World War I	tournament not created	World War I	(United States) Fred Alexander (6/6) (United States) Harold Throckmorton (1/1)
1918	World War I	tournament not created	World War I	(United States) Bill Tilden (1/6) (United States) Vincent Richards (1/7)
1919	(Australia) Pat O'Hara Wood (1/5) (Australia) Ron Thomas (1/3)	tournament not created	(Australia) Ron Thomas (2/3) (Australia) Pat O'Hara Wood (2/5)	(Australia) Norman Brookes (3/4) (Australia) Gerald Patterson (2/6)
1920	(Australia) Pat O'Hara Wood (3/5) (Australia) Ron Thomas (3/3)	tournament not created	(United States) Richard Williams (1/3) (United States) Chuck Garland (1/1)	(United States) William Johnston (3/3) (United States) Clarence Griffin (3/3)
1921	(Australia) S.H. Eaton (1/1) (Australia) Rhys Gemmell (1/1)	tournament not created	(United Kingdom) Randolph Lycett (3/5) (United Kingdom) Max Woosnam (1/1)	(United States) Bill Tilden (2/6) (United States) Vincent Richards (2/7)
1922	(Australia) John Hawkes (1/3) (Australia) Gerald Patterson (3/6)	tournament not created	(Australia) James Anderson (1/2) (United Kingdom) Randolph Lycett (4/5)	(United States) Bill Tilden (3/6) (United States) Vincent Richards (3/7)
1923	(Australia) Pat O'Hara Wood (4/5) (Australia) Bert St. John (1/1)	tournament not created	(United Kingdom) Leslie Godfree (1/1) (United Kingdom) Randolph Lycett (5/5)	(United States) Bill Tilden (4/6) (South Africa) Brian Norton (1/1)
1924	(Australia) James Anderson (2/2) (Australia) Norman Brookes (4/4)	tournament not created	(United States) Frank Hunter (1/3) (United States) Vincent Richards (4/7)	(United States) Howard Kinsey (1/2) (United States) Robert Kinsey (1/1)
1925	(Australia) Pat O'Hara Wood (5/5) (Australia) Gerald Patterson (4/6)	(France) Jean Borotra (1/9) (France) René Lacoste (1/3)	(France) Jean Borotra (2/9) (France) René Lacoste (2/3)	(United States) Richard Williams (2/3) (United States) Vincent Richards (5/7)
1926	(Australia) John Hawkes (2/3) (Australia) Gerald Patterson (5/6)	(United States) Vincent Richards (6/7) (United States) Howard Kinsey (2/2)	(France) Jacques Brugnon (1/10) (France) Henri Cochet (1/5)	(United States) Richard Williams (3/3) (United States) Vincent Richards (7/7)
1927	(Australia) John Hawkes (3/3) (Australia) Gerald Patterson (6/6)^{††}	(France) Henri Cochet (2/5) (France) Jacques Brugnon (2/10)	(United States) Frank Hunter (2/3) (United States) Bill Tilden (5/6)	(United States) Bill Tilden (6/6) (United States) Frank Hunter (3/3)
1928	(France) Jean Borotra (3/9) (France) Jacques Brugnon (3/10)	(France) Jean Borotra (4/9) (France) Jacques Brugnon (4/10)	(France) Jacques Brugnon (5/10) (France) Henri Cochet (3/5)	(United States) George Lott (1/8) (United States) John Hennessey (1/1)
1929	(Australia) Jack Crawford (1/6) (Australia) Harry Hopman (1/2)	(France) René Lacoste (3/3) (France) Jean Borotra (5/9)	(United States) Wilmer Allison (1/4) (United States) John Van Ryn (1/6)	(United States) George Lott (2/8) (United States) John Doeg (1/2)
1930	(Australia) Jack Crawford (2/6) (Australia) Harry Hopman (2/2)	(France) Henri Cochet (4/5) (France) Jacques Brugnon (6/10)	(United States) Wilmer Allison (2/4) (United States) John Van Ryn (2/6)	(United States) George Lott (3/8) (United States) John Doeg (2/2)
1931	(Australia) Charles Donohoe (1/1) (Australia) Ray Dunlop (1/1)	(United States) George Lott (4/8) (United States) John Van Ryn (3/6)	(United States) George Lott (5/8) (United States) John Van Ryn (4/6)	(United States) Wilmer Allison (3/4) (United States) John Van Ryn (5/6)
1932	(Australia) Jack Crawford (3/6) (Australia) Edgar Moon (1/1)	(France) Henri Cochet (5/5) (France) Jacques Brugnon (7/10)	(France) Jean Borotra (6/9) (France) Jacques Brugnon (8/10)	(United States) Ellsworth Vines (1/2) (United States) Keith Gledhill (1/2)
1933	(United States) Keith Gledhill (2/2) (United States) Ellsworth Vines (2/2)	(United Kingdom) Pat Hughes (1/3) (United Kingdom) Fred Perry (1/2)	(France) Jean Borotra (7/9) (France) Jacques Brugnon (9/10)	(United States) George Lott (6/8) (United States) Lester Stoefen (1/3)
1934	(United Kingdom) Fred Perry (2/2) (United Kingdom) Pat Hughes (2/3)	(France) Jean Borotra (8/9) (France) Jacques Brugnon (10/10)	(United States) George Lott (7/8) (United States) Lester Stoefen (2/3)	(United States) George Lott (8/8) (United States) Lester Stoefen (3/3)
1935	(Australia) Jack Crawford (4/6) (Australia) Vivian McGrath (1/1)	(Australia) Jack Crawford (5/6) (Australia) Adrian Quist (1/14)	(Australia) Jack Crawford (6/6) (Australia) Adrian Quist (2/14)	(United States) Wilmer Allison (4/4) (United States) John Van Ryn (6/6)
1936	(Australia) Adrian Quist (3/14) (Australia) Don Turnbull (1/2)	(France) Jean Borotra (9/9) (France) Marcel Bernard (1/2)	(United Kingdom) Pat Hughes (3/3) (United Kingdom) Raymond Tuckey (1/1)	(United States) Don Budge (1/4) (United States) Gene Mako (1/4)
1937	(Australia) Adrian Quist (4/14) (Australia) Don Turnbull (2/2)	(Germany) Gottfried von Cramm (1/2) (Germany) Henner Henkel (1/2)	(United States) Don Budge (2/4) (United States) Gene Mako (2/4)	(Germany) Gottfried von Cramm (2/2) (Germany) Henner Henkel (2/2)
1938	(Australia) John Bromwich (1/13) (Australia) Adrian Quist (5/14)	(France) Bernard Destremau (1/1) (France) Yvon Petra (1/2)	(United States) Don Budge (3/4) (United States) Gene Mako (3/4)	(United States) Don Budge (4/4) (United States) Gene Mako (4/4)
1939	(Australia) John Bromwich (2/13) (Australia) Adrian Quist (6/14)	(United States) Don McNeill (1/2) (United States) Charles Harris (1/1)	(United States) Elwood Cooke (1/1) (United States) Bobby Riggs (1/1)	(Australia) Adrian Quist (7/14) (Australia) John Bromwich (3/13)
1940	(Australia) John Bromwich (4/13) (Australia) Adrian Quist (8/14)	tournament cancelled	World War II	(United States) Jack Kramer (1/6) (United States) Fred Schroeder (1/3)
1941	World War II	Tournoi de France held under German occupation	World War II	(United States) Jack Kramer (2/6) (United States) Fred Schroeder (2/3)
1942	World War II	Tournoi de France held under German occupation	World War II	(United States) Gardnar Mulloy (1/5) (United States) William Talbert (1/5)
1943	World War II	Tournoi de France held under German occupation	World War II	(United States) Jack Kramer (3/6) (United States) Frank Parker (1/3)
1944	World War II	Tournoi de France held under German occupation	World War II	(United States) Don McNeill (2/2) (United States) Bob Falkenburg (1/2)
1945	World War II	Tournoi de France held under German occupation	World War II	(United States) Gardnar Mulloy (2/5) (United States) William Talbert (2/5)
1946	(Australia) John Bromwich (5/13) (Australia) Adrian Quist (9/14)	(France) Marcel Bernard (2/2) (France) Yvon Petra (2/2)	(United States) Tom Brown (1/1) (United States) Jack Kramer (4/6)	(United States) Gardnar Mulloy (3/5) (United States) William Talbert (3/5)
1947	(Australia) John Bromwich (6/13) (Australia) Adrian Quist (10/14)	(South Africa) Eustace Fannin (1/1) (South Africa) Eric Sturgess (1/1)	(United States) Bob Falkenburg (2/2) (United States) Jack Kramer (5/6)	(United States) Jack Kramer (6/6) (United States) Fred Schroeder (3/3)
1948	(Australia) John Bromwich (7/13) (Australia) Adrian Quist (11/14)	(Sweden) Lennart Bergelin (1/1) (Czech Republic) Jaroslav Drobný (1/1)	(Australia) John Bromwich (8/13) (Australia) Frank Sedgman (1/9)	(United States) Gardnar Mulloy (4/5) (United States) William Talbert (4/5)
1949	(Australia) John Bromwich (9/13) (Australia) Adrian Quist (12/14)	(United States) Pancho Gonzales (1/2) (United States) Frank Parker (2/3)	(United States) Pancho Gonzales (2/2) (United States) Frank Parker (3/3)	(Australia) John Bromwich (10/13) (Australia) Bill Sidwell (1/1)
1950	(Australia) John Bromwich (11/13) (Australia) Adrian Quist (13/14)	(United States) William Talbert (5/5) (United States) Tony Trabert (1/5)	(Australia) John Bromwich (12/13) (Australia) Adrian Quist (14/14)	(Australia) John Bromwich (13/13) (Australia) Frank Sedgman (2/9)
1951	(Australia) Ken McGregor (1/7) (Australia) Frank Sedgman (3/9)	(Australia) Ken McGregor (2/7) (Australia) Frank Sedgman (4/9)	(Australia) Ken McGregor (3/7) (Australia) Frank Sedgman (5/9)	(Australia) Ken McGregor (4/7) (Australia) Frank Sedgman (6/9)
1952	(Australia) Ken McGregor (5/7) (Australia) Frank Sedgman (7/9)	(Australia) Ken McGregor (6/7) (Australia) Frank Sedgman (8/9)	(Australia) Ken McGregor (7/7) (Australia) Frank Sedgman (9/9)	(Australia) Mervyn Rose (1/4) (United States) Vic Seixas (1/5)
1953	(Australia) Lew Hoad (1/8) (Australia) Ken Rosewall (1/9)	(Australia) Lew Hoad (2/8) (Australia) Ken Rosewall (2/9)	(Australia) Lew Hoad (3/8) (Australia) Ken Rosewall (3/9)	(Australia) Rex Hartwig (1/4) (Australia) Mervyn Rose (2/4)
1954	(Australia) Rex Hartwig (2/4) (Australia) Mervyn Rose (3/4)	(United States) Vic Seixas (2/5) (United States) Tony Trabert (2/5)	(Australia) Rex Hartwig (3/4) (Australia) Mervyn Rose (4/4)	(United States) Vic Seixas (3/5) (United States) Tony Trabert (3/5)
1955	(United States) Vic Seixas (4/5) (United States) Tony Trabert (4/5)	(United States) Vic Seixas (5/5) (United States) Tony Trabert (5/5)	(Australia) Rex Hartwig (4/4) (Australia) Lew Hoad (4/8)	(Japan) Kosei Kamo (1/1) (Japan) Atsushi Miyagi (1/1)
1956	(Australia) Lew Hoad (5/8) (Australia) Ken Rosewall (4/9)	(Australia) Don Candy (1/1) (United States) Robert Perry (1/1)	(Australia) Lew Hoad (6/8) (Australia) Ken Rosewall (5/9)	(Australia) Lew Hoad (7/8) (Australia) Ken Rosewall (6/9)
1957	(Australia) Neale Fraser (1/11) (Australia) Lew Hoad (8/8)	(Australia) Malcolm Anderson (1/2) (Australia) Ashley Cooper (1/4)	(United States) Budge Patty (1/1) (United States) Gardnar Mulloy (5/5)	(Australia) Neale Fraser (2/11) (Australia) Ashley Cooper (2/4)
1958	(Australia) Ashley Cooper (3/4) (Australia) Neale Fraser (3/11)	(Australia) Ashley Cooper (4/4) (Australia) Neale Fraser (4/11)	(Sweden) Sven Davidson (1/1) (Sweden) Ulf Schmidt (1/1)	(United States) Alex Olmedo (1/1) (United States) Hamilton Richardson (1/1)
1959	(Australia) Rod Laver (1/6) (Australia) Robert Mark (1/3)	(Italy) Orlando Sirola (1/1) (Italy) Nicola Pietrangeli (1/1)	(Australia) Roy Emerson (1/16) (Australia) Neale Fraser (5/11)	(Australia) Neale Fraser (6/11) (Australia) Roy Emerson (2/16)
1960	(Australia) Rod Laver (2/6) (Australia) Robert Mark (2/3)	(Australia) Roy Emerson (3/16) (Australia) Neale Fraser (7/11)	(Mexico) Rafael Osuna (1/3) (United States) Dennis Ralston (1/5)	(Australia) Neale Fraser (8/11) (Australia) Roy Emerson (4/16)
1961	(Australia) Rod Laver (3/6) (Australia) Robert Mark (3/3)	(Australia) Roy Emerson (5/16) (Australia) Rod Laver (4/6)	(Australia) Roy Emerson (6/16) (Australia) Neale Fraser (9/11)	(United States) Chuck McKinley (1/3) (United States) Dennis Ralston (2/5)
1962	(Australia) Roy Emerson (7/16) (Australia) Neale Fraser (10/11)	(Australia) Roy Emerson (8/16) (Australia) Neale Fraser (11/11)	(Australia) Bob Hewitt (1/9) (Australia) Fred Stolle (1/10)	(Mexico) Rafael Osuna (2/3) (Mexico) Antonio Palafox (1/2)
1963	(Australia) Bob Hewitt (2/9) (Australia) Fred Stolle (2/10)	(Australia) Roy Emerson (9/16) (Spain) Manuel Santana (1/1)	(Mexico) Rafael Osuna (3/3) (Mexico) Antonio Palafox (2/2)	(United States) Chuck McKinley (2/3) (United States) Dennis Ralston (3/5)
1964	(Australia) Bob Hewitt (3/9) (Australia) Fred Stolle (3/10)	(Australia) Roy Emerson (10/16) (Australia) Ken Fletcher (1/2)	(Australia) Bob Hewitt (4/9) (Australia) Fred Stolle (4/10)	(United States) Chuck McKinley (3/3) (United States) Dennis Ralston (4/5)
1965	(Australia) John Newcombe (1/17) (Australia) Tony Roche (1/13)	(Australia) Roy Emerson (11/16) (Australia) Fred Stolle (5/10)	(Australia) John Newcombe (2/17) (Australia) Tony Roche (2/13)	(Australia) Roy Emerson (12/16) (Australia) Fred Stolle (6/10)
1966	(Australia) Roy Emerson (13/16) (Australia) Fred Stolle (7/10)	(United States) Clark Graebner (1/1) (United States) Dennis Ralston (5/5)	(Australia) Ken Fletcher (2/2) (Australia) John Newcombe (3/17)	(Australia) Roy Emerson (14/16) (Australia) Fred Stolle (8/10)
1967	(Australia) John Newcombe (4/17) (Australia) Tony Roche (3/13)	(Australia) John Newcombe (5/17) (Australia) Tony Roche (4/13)	(South Africa) Bob Hewitt (5/9) (South Africa) Frew McMillan (1/5)	(Australia) John Newcombe (6/17) (Australia) Tony Roche (5/13)
1968	(Australia) Dick Crealy (1/2) (Australia) Allan Stone (1/2)	↓ Open Era ↓		
1968	↓ Open Era ↓	(Australia) Ken Rosewall (7/9) (Australia) Fred Stolle (9/10)	(Australia) John Newcombe (7/17) (Australia) Tony Roche (6/13)	(United States) Robert Lutz (1/5) (United States) Stan Smith (1/5)
1969	(Australia) Roy Emerson (15/16) (Australia) Rod Laver (5/6)	(Australia) John Newcombe (8/17) (Australia) Tony Roche (7/13)	(Australia) John Newcombe (9/17) (Australia) Tony Roche (8/13)	(Australia) Ken Rosewall (8/9) (Australia) Fred Stolle (10/10)
1970	(United States) Robert Lutz (2/5) (United States) Stan Smith (2/5)	(Romania) Ilie Năstase (1/3) (Romania) Ion Țiriac (1/1)	(Australia) John Newcombe (10/17) (Australia) Tony Roche (9/13)	(France) Pierre Barthès (1/1) (Socialist Federal Republic of Yugoslavia) Nikola Pilić (1/1)
1971	(Australia) John Newcombe (11/17) (Australia) Tony Roche (10/13)	(United States) Arthur Ashe (1/2) (United States) Marty Riessen (1/2)	(Australia) Roy Emerson (16/16) (Australia) Rod Laver (6/6)	(Australia) John Newcombe (12/17) (United Kingdom) Roger Taylor (1/2)
1972	(Australia) Owen Davidson (1/2) (Australia) Ken Rosewall (9/9)	(South Africa) Bob Hewitt (6/9) (South Africa) Frew McMillan (2/5)	(South Africa) Bob Hewitt (7/9) (South Africa) Frew McMillan (3/5)	(South Africa) Cliff Drysdale (1/1) (United Kingdom) Roger Taylor (2/2)
1973	(Australia) Malcolm Anderson (2/2) (Australia) John Newcombe (13/17)	(Australia) John Newcombe (14/17) (Netherlands) Tom Okker (1/2)	(United States) Jimmy Connors (1/2) (Romania) Ilie Năstase (2/3)	(Australia) Owen Davidson (2/2) (Australia) John Newcombe (15/17)
1974	(Australia) Ross Case (1/2) (Australia) Geoff Masters (1/2)	(Australia) Dick Crealy (2/2) (New Zealand) Onny Parun (1/1)	(Australia) John Newcombe (16/17) (Australia) Tony Roche (11/13)	(United States) Robert Lutz (3/5) (United States) Stan Smith (3/5)
1975	(Australia) John Alexander (1/2) (Australia) Phil Dent (1/1)	(United States) Brian Gottfried (1/3) (Mexico) Raúl Ramírez (1/3)	(United States) Vitas Gerulaitis (1/1) (United States) Sandy Mayer (1/2)	(United States) Jimmy Connors (2/2) (Romania) Ilie Năstase (3/3)
1976	(Australia) John Newcombe (17/17) (Australia) Tony Roche (12/13)	(United States) Fred McNair (1/1) (United States) Sherwood Stewart (1/3)	(United States) Brian Gottfried (2/3) (Mexico) Raúl Ramírez (2/3)	(United States) Marty Riessen (2/2) (Netherlands) Tom Okker (2/2)
1977	(United States) Arthur Ashe (2/2) (Australia) Tony Roche (13/13) ^{(Jan)}	(United States) Brian Gottfried (3/3) (Mexico) Raúl Ramírez (3/3)	(Australia) Ross Case (2/2) (Australia) Geoff Masters (2/2)	(South Africa) Bob Hewitt (8/9) (South Africa) Frew McMillan (4/5)
1977	(Australia) Ray Ruffels (1/1) (Australia) Allan Stone (2/2) ^{(Dec) †}	(United States) Brian Gottfried (3/3) (Mexico) Raúl Ramírez (3/3)	(Australia) Ross Case (2/2) (Australia) Geoff Masters (2/2)	(South Africa) Bob Hewitt (8/9) (South Africa) Frew McMillan (4/5)
1978	(Poland) Wojciech Fibak (1/1) (Australia) Kim Warwick (1/4) ^{†}	(United States) Gene Mayer (1/2) (United States) Hank Pfister (1/2)	(South Africa) Bob Hewitt (9/9) (South Africa) Frew McMillan (5/5)	(United States) Robert Lutz (4/5) (United States) Stan Smith (4/5)
1979	(Australia) Peter McNamara (1/3) (Australia) Paul McNamee (1/4) ^{†}	(United States) Gene Mayer (2/2) (United States) Sandy Mayer (2/2)	(United States) Peter Fleming (1/7) (United States) John McEnroe (1/9)	(United States) Peter Fleming (2/7) (United States) John McEnroe (2/9)
1980	(Australia) Mark Edmondson (1/5) (Australia) Kim Warwick (2/4) ^{†}	(United States) Victor Amaya (1/1) (United States) Hank Pfister (2/2)	(Australia) Peter McNamara (2/3) (Australia) Paul McNamee (2/4)	(United States) Robert Lutz (5/5) (United States) Stan Smith (5/5)
1981	(Australia) Mark Edmondson (2/5) (Australia) Kim Warwick (3/4) ^{†}	(Switzerland) Heinz Günthardt (1/2) (Hungary) Balázs Taróczy (1/2)	(United States) Peter Fleming (3/7) (United States) John McEnroe (3/9)	(United States) Peter Fleming (4/7) (United States) John McEnroe (4/9)
1982	(Australia) John Alexander (2/2) (Australia) John Fitzgerald (1/7) ^{†}	(United States) Sherwood Stewart (2/3) (United States) Ferdi Taygan (1/1)	(Australia) Peter McNamara (3/3) (Australia) Paul McNamee (3/4)	(South Africa) Kevin Curren (1/1) (United States) Steve Denton (1/1)
1983	(Australia) Mark Edmondson (3/5) (Australia) Paul McNamee (4/4) ^{†}	(Sweden) Anders Järryd (1/8) (Sweden) Hans Simonsson (1/1)	(United States) Peter Fleming (5/7) (United States) John McEnroe (5/9)	(United States) Peter Fleming (6/7) (United States) John McEnroe (6/9)
1984	(Australia) Mark Edmondson (4/5) (United States) Sherwood Stewart (3/3) ^{†}	(France) Henri Leconte (1/1) (France) Yannick Noah (1/1)	(United States) Peter Fleming (7/7) (United States) John McEnroe (7/9)	(Australia) John Fitzgerald (2/7) (Czech Republic) Tomáš Šmíd (1/2)
1985	(United States) Paul Annacone (1/1) (South Africa) Christo van Rensburg (1/1) ^{†}	(Australia) Mark Edmondson (5/5) (Australia) Kim Warwick (4/4)	(Switzerland) Heinz Günthardt (2/2) (Hungary) Balázs Taróczy (2/2)	(United States) Ken Flach (1/4) (United States) Robert Seguso (1/4)
1986	no competition	(Australia) John Fitzgerald (3/7) (Czech Republic) Tomáš Šmíd (2/2)	(Sweden) Joakim Nyström (1/1) (Sweden) Mats Wilander (1/1)	(Ecuador) Andrés Gómez (1/2) (Socialist Federal Republic of Yugoslavia) Slobodan Živojinović (1/1)
1987	(Sweden) Stefan Edberg (1/3) (Sweden) Anders Järryd (2/8)	(Sweden) Anders Järryd (3/8) (United States) Robert Seguso (2/4)	(United States) Ken Flach (2/4) (United States) Robert Seguso (3/4)	(Sweden) Stefan Edberg (2/3) (Sweden) Anders Järryd (4/8)
1988	(United States) Rick Leach (1/5) (United States) Jim Pugh (1/3)	(Ecuador) Andrés Gómez (2/2) (Spain) Emilio Sánchez (1/3)	(United States) Ken Flach (3/4) (United States) Robert Seguso (4/4)	(Spain) Sergio Casal (1/2) (Spain) Emilio Sánchez (2/3)
1989	(United States) Rick Leach (2/5) (United States) Jim Pugh (2/3)	(United States) Jim Grabb (1/2) (United States) Patrick McEnroe (1/1)	(Australia) John Fitzgerald (4/7) (Sweden) Anders Järryd (5/8)	(United States) John McEnroe (8/9) (Australia) Mark Woodforde (1/12)
1990	(South Africa) Pieter Aldrich (1/2) (South Africa) Danie Visser (1/3)	(Spain) Sergio Casal (2/2) (Spain) Emilio Sánchez (3/3)	(United States) Rick Leach (3/5) (United States) Jim Pugh (3/3)	(South Africa) Pieter Aldrich (2/2) (South Africa) Danie Visser (2/3)
1991	(United States) Scott Davis (1/1) (United States) David Pate (1/1)	(Australia) John Fitzgerald (5/7) (Sweden) Anders Järryd (6/8)	(Australia) John Fitzgerald (6/7) (Sweden) Anders Järryd (7/8)	(Australia) John Fitzgerald (7/7) (Sweden) Anders Järryd (8/8)
1992	(Australia) Todd Woodbridge (1/16) (Australia) Mark Woodforde (2/12)	(Switzerland) Jakob Hlasek (1/1) (Switzerland) Marc Rosset (1/1)	(United States) John McEnroe (9/9) (Germany) Michael Stich (1/1)	(United States) Jim Grabb (2/2) (United States) Richey Reneberg (1/2)
1993	(South Africa) Danie Visser (3/3) (Australia) Laurie Warder (1/1)	(United States) Luke Jensen (1/1) (United States) Murphy Jensen (1/1)	(Australia) Todd Woodbridge (2/16) (Australia) Mark Woodforde (3/12)	(United States) Ken Flach (4/4) (United States) Rick Leach (4/5)
1994	(Netherlands) Jacco Eltingh (1/6) (Netherlands) Paul Haarhuis (1/6)	(Zimbabwe) Byron Black (1/1) (United States) Jonathan Stark (1/1)	(Australia) Todd Woodbridge (3/16) (Australia) Mark Woodforde (4/12)	(Netherlands) Jacco Eltingh (2/6) (Netherlands) Paul Haarhuis (2/6)
1995	(United States) Jared Palmer (1/2) (United States) Richey Reneberg (2/2)	(Netherlands) Jacco Eltingh (3/6) (Netherlands) Paul Haarhuis (3/6)	(Australia) Todd Woodbridge (4/16) (Australia) Mark Woodforde (5/12)	(Australia) Todd Woodbridge (5/16) (Australia) Mark Woodforde (6/12)
1996	(Sweden) Stefan Edberg (3/3) (Czech Republic) Petr Korda (1/1)	(Russia) Yevgeny Kafelnikov (1/4) (Czech Republic) Daniel Vacek (1/3)	(Australia) Todd Woodbridge (6/16) (Australia) Mark Woodforde (7/12)	(Australia) Todd Woodbridge (7/16) (Australia) Mark Woodforde (8/12)
1997	(Australia) Todd Woodbridge (8/16) (Australia) Mark Woodforde (9/12)	(Russia) Yevgeny Kafelnikov (2/4) (Czech Republic) Daniel Vacek (2/3)	(Australia) Todd Woodbridge (9/16) (Australia) Mark Woodforde (10/12)	(Russia) Yevgeny Kafelnikov (3/4) (Czech Republic) Daniel Vacek (3/3)
1998	(Sweden) Jonas Björkman (1/9) (Netherlands) Jacco Eltingh (4/6)	(Netherlands) Jacco Eltingh (5/6) (Netherlands) Paul Haarhuis (4/6)	(Netherlands) Jacco Eltingh (6/6) (Netherlands) Paul Haarhuis (5/6)	(Australia) Sandon Stolle (1/1) (Czech Republic) Cyril Suk (1/1)
1999	(Sweden) Jonas Björkman (2/9) (Australia) Patrick Rafter (1/1)	(India) Mahesh Bhupathi (1/4) (India) Leander Paes (1/8)	(India) Mahesh Bhupathi (2/4) (India) Leander Paes (2/8)	(Canada) Sébastien Lareau (1/1) (United States) Alex O'Brien (1/1)
2000	(South Africa) Ellis Ferreira (1/1) (United States) Rick Leach (5/5)	(Australia) Todd Woodbridge (10/16) (Australia) Mark Woodforde (11/12)	(Australia) Todd Woodbridge (11/16) (Australia) Mark Woodforde (12/12)	(Australia) Lleyton Hewitt (1/1) (Belarus) Max Mirnyi (1/6)
2001	(Sweden) Jonas Björkman (3/9) (Australia) Todd Woodbridge (12/16)	(India) Mahesh Bhupathi (3/4) (India) Leander Paes (3/8)	(United States) Donald Johnson (1/1) (United States) Jared Palmer (2/2)	(Zimbabwe) Wayne Black (1/2) (Zimbabwe) Kevin Ullyett (1/2)
2002	(The Bahamas) Mark Knowles (1/3) (Canada) Daniel Nestor (1/8)	(Netherlands) Paul Haarhuis (6/6) (Russia) Yevgeny Kafelnikov (4/4)	(Sweden) Jonas Björkman (4/9) (Australia) Todd Woodbridge (13/16)	(India) Mahesh Bhupathi (4/4) (Belarus) Max Mirnyi (2/6)
2003	(France) Michaël Llodra (1/3) (France) Fabrice Santoro (1/2)	(United States) Bob Bryan (1/16) (United States) Mike Bryan (1/18)	(Sweden) Jonas Björkman (5/9) (Australia) Todd Woodbridge (14/16)	(Sweden) Jonas Björkman (6/9) (Australia) Todd Woodbridge (15/16)
2004	(France) Michaël Llodra (2/3) (France) Fabrice Santoro (2/2)	(Belgium) Xavier Malisse (1/1) (Belgium) Olivier Rochus (1/1)	(Sweden) Jonas Björkman (7/9) (Australia) Todd Woodbridge (16/16)	(The Bahamas) Mark Knowles (2/3) (Canada) Daniel Nestor (2/8)
2005	(Zimbabwe) Wayne Black (2/2) (Zimbabwe) Kevin Ullyett (2/2)	(Sweden) Jonas Björkman (8/9) (Belarus) Max Mirnyi (3/6)	(Australia) Stephen Huss (1/1) (South Africa) Wesley Moodie (1/1)	(United States) Bob Bryan (2/16) (United States) Mike Bryan (2/18)
2006	(United States) Bob Bryan (3/16) (United States) Mike Bryan (3/18)	(Sweden) Jonas Björkman (9/9) (Belarus) Max Mirnyi (4/6)	(United States) Bob Bryan (4/16) (United States) Mike Bryan (4/18)	(Czech Republic) Martin Damm (1/1) (India) Leander Paes (4/8)
2007	(United States) Bob Bryan (5/16) (United States) Mike Bryan (5/18)	(The Bahamas) Mark Knowles (3/3) (Canada) Daniel Nestor (3/8)	(France) Arnaud Clément (1/1) (France) Michaël Llodra (3/3)	(Sweden) Simon Aspelin (1/1) (Austria) Julian Knowle (1/1)
2008	(Israel) Jonathan Erlich (1/1) (Israel) Andy Ram (1/1)	(Uruguay) Pablo Cuevas (1/1) (Peru) Luis Horna (1/1)	(Canada) Daniel Nestor (4/8) (Serbia) Nenad Zimonjić (1/3)	(United States) Bob Bryan (6/16) (United States) Mike Bryan (6/18)
2009	(United States) Bob Bryan (7/16) (United States) Mike Bryan (7/18)	(Czech Republic) Lukáš Dlouhý (1/2) (India) Leander Paes (5/8)	(Canada) Daniel Nestor (5/8) (Serbia) Nenad Zimonjić (2/3)	(Czech Republic) Lukáš Dlouhý (2/2) (India) Leander Paes (6/8)
2010	(United States) Bob Bryan (8/16) (United States) Mike Bryan (8/18)	(Canada) Daniel Nestor (6/8) (Serbia) Nenad Zimonjić (3/3)	(Austria) Jürgen Melzer (1/2) (Germany) Philipp Petzschner (1/2)	(United States) Bob Bryan (9/16) (United States) Mike Bryan (9/18)
2011	(United States) Bob Bryan (10/16) (United States) Mike Bryan (10/18)	(Belarus) Max Mirnyi (5/6) (Canada) Daniel Nestor (7/8)	(United States) Bob Bryan (11/16) (United States) Mike Bryan (11/18)	(Austria) Jürgen Melzer (2/2) (Germany) Philipp Petzschner (2/2)
2012	(India) Leander Paes (7/8) (Czech Republic) Radek Štěpánek (1/2)	(Belarus) Max Mirnyi (6/6) (Canada) Daniel Nestor (8/8)	(United Kingdom) Jonathan Marray (1/1) (Denmark) Frederik Nielsen (1/1)	(United States) Bob Bryan (12/16) (United States) Mike Bryan (12/18)
2013	(United States) Bob Bryan (13/16) (United States) Mike Bryan (13/18)	(United States) Bob Bryan (14/16) (United States) Mike Bryan (14/18)	(United States) Bob Bryan (15/16) (United States) Mike Bryan (15/18)	(India) Leander Paes (8/8) (Czech Republic) Radek Štěpánek (2/2)
2014	(Poland) Łukasz Kubot (1/2) (Sweden) Robert Lindstedt (1/1)	(France) Julien Benneteau (1/1) (France) Édouard Roger-Vasselin (1/1)	(Canada) Vasek Pospisil (1/1) (United States) Jack Sock (1/3)	(United States) Bob Bryan (16/16) (United States) Mike Bryan (16/18)
2015	(Italy) Simone Bolelli (1/1) (Italy) Fabio Fognini (1/1)	(Croatia) Ivan Dodig (1/3) (Brazil) Marcelo Melo (1/2)	(Netherlands) Jean-Julien Rojer (1/3) (Romania) Horia Tecău (1/2)	(France) Pierre-Hugues Herbert (1/5) (France) Nicolas Mahut (1/5)
2016	(United Kingdom) Jamie Murray (1/2) (Brazil) Bruno Soares (1/3)	(Spain) Feliciano López (1/1) (Spain) Marc López (1/1)	(France) Pierre-Hugues Herbert (2/5) (France) Nicolas Mahut (2/5)	(United Kingdom) Jamie Murray (2/2) (Brazil) Bruno Soares (2/3)
2017	(Finland) Henri Kontinen (1/1) (Australia) John Peers (1/1)	(United States) Ryan Harrison (1/1) (New Zealand) Michael Venus (1/1)	(Poland) Łukasz Kubot (2/2) (Brazil) Marcelo Melo (2/2)	(Netherlands) Jean-Julien Rojer (2/3) (Romania) Horia Tecău (2/2)
2018	(Austria) Oliver Marach (1/1) (Croatia) Mate Pavić (1/4)	(France) Pierre-Hugues Herbert (3/5) (France) Nicolas Mahut (3/5)	(United States) Mike Bryan (17/18) (United States) Jack Sock (2/3)	(United States) Mike Bryan (18/18) (United States) Jack Sock (3/3)
2019	(France) Pierre-Hugues Herbert (4/5) (France) Nicolas Mahut (4/5)	(Germany) Kevin Krawietz (1/2) (Germany) Andreas Mies (1/2)	(Colombia) Juan Sebastián Cabal (1/2) (Colombia) Robert Farah (1/2)	(Colombia) Juan Sebastián Cabal (2/2) (Colombia) Robert Farah (2/2)
2020	(United States) Rajeev Ram (1/4) (United Kingdom) Joe Salisbury (1/4)	(Germany) Kevin Krawietz (2/2) (Germany) Andreas Mies (2/2) ^{†††}	cancelled due to COVID-19 pandemic^{†††}	(Croatia) Mate Pavić (2/4) (Brazil) Bruno Soares (3/3)
2021	(Croatia) Ivan Dodig (2/3) (Slovakia) Filip Polášek (1/1)	(France) Pierre-Hugues Herbert (5/5) (France) Nicolas Mahut (5/5)	(Croatia) Nikola Mektić (1/1) (Croatia) Mate Pavić (3/4)	(United States) Rajeev Ram (2/4) (United Kingdom) Joe Salisbury (2/4)
2022	(Australia) Thanasi Kokkinakis (1/1) (Australia) Nick Kyrgios (1/1)	(El Salvador) Marcelo Arévalo (1/2) (Netherlands) Jean-Julien Rojer (3/3)	(Australia) Matthew Ebden (1/2) (Australia) Max Purcell (1/2)	(United States) Rajeev Ram (3/4) (United Kingdom) Joe Salisbury (3/4)
2023	(Australia) Rinky Hijikata (1/1) (Australia) Jason Kubler (1/1)	(Croatia) Ivan Dodig (3/3) (United States) Austin Krajicek (1/1)	(Netherlands) Wesley Koolhof (1/1) (United Kingdom) Neal Skupski (1/3)	(United States) Rajeev Ram (4/4) (United Kingdom) Joe Salisbury (4/4)
2024	(India) Rohan Bopanna (1/1) (Australia) Matthew Ebden (2/2)	(El Salvador) Marcelo Arévalo (2/2) (Croatia) Mate Pavić (4/4)	(Finland) Harri Heliövaara (1/3) (United Kingdom) Henry Patten (1/3)	(Australia) Max Purcell (2/2) (Australia) Jordan Thompson (1/1)
2025	(Finland) Harri Heliövaara (2/3) (United Kingdom) Henry Patten (2/3)	(Spain) Marcel Granollers (1/3) (Argentina) Horacio Zeballos (1/3)	(United Kingdom) Julian Cash (1/1) (United Kingdom) Lloyd Glasspool (1/1)	(Spain) Marcel Granollers (2/3) (Argentina) Horacio Zeballos (2/3)
2026	(United States) Christian Harrison (1/2) (United Kingdom) Neal Skupski (2/3)	(Spain) Marcel Granollers (3/3) (Argentina) Horacio Zeballos (3/3)	(Finland) Harri Heliövaara (3/3) (United Kingdom) Henry Patten (3/3)	(United States) Christian Harrison (2/2) (United Kingdom) Neal Skupski (3/3)
Year	Australian Open	French Open	Wimbledon	US Open

== Champions list ==
=== Most Grand Slam doubles titles ===
AO Australian Open	WIM Wimbledon
FO French Open	USO US Open

==== Individual ====
Active players and tournament records indicated in bold.

Titles	Player	AO	FO	WIM	USO	Years
18	(United States) Mike Bryan	6	2	4	**6**	2003–2018
17	(Australia) John Newcombe	5	3	6	3	1965–1976
16	(Australia) Roy Emerson	3	**6**	3	4	1959–1971
16	(Australia) Todd Woodbridge	3	1	**9**	3	1992–2004
16	(United States) Bob Bryan	6	2	3	5	2003–2014
14	(Australia) Adrian Quist	**10**	1	2	1	1935–1950
13	(Australia) John Bromwich	8	0	2	3	1938–1950
13	(Australia) Tony Roche	5	2	5	1	1965–1977
12	(Australia) Mark Woodforde	2	1	6	3	1989–2000
11	(Australia) Neale Fraser	3	3	2	3	1957–1962
Top 10

==== Team ====
Active teams and tournament records indicated in bold.

Titles	Player	AO	FO	WIM	USO	Years
16	(United States) Bob Bryan (United States) Mike Bryan	6	2	3	**5**	2003–2014
12	(Australia) John Newcombe (Australia) Tony Roche	4	2	5	1	1965–1976
11	(Australia) Todd Woodbridge (Australia) Mark Woodforde	2	1	6	2	1992–2000
10	(United Kingdom) Laurence Doherty (United Kingdom) Reginald Doherty	0	0	**8**	2	1897–1905
10	(Australia) John Bromwich (Australia) Adrian Quist	**8**	0	1	1	1936–1950
7	(Australia) Ken McGregor (Australia) Frank Sedgman	2	2	2	1	1951–1952
7	(Australia) Roy Emerson (Australia) Neale Fraser	1	2	2	2	1959–1962
7	(United States) Peter Fleming (United States) John McEnroe	0	0	4	3	1979–1984
6	(Australia) Lew Hoad (Australia) Ken Rosewall	2	1	2	1	1953–1956
5	(United States) Richard Sears (United States) James Dwight	0	0	0	**5**	1882–1887
5	(United Kingdom) Ernest Renshaw (United Kingdom) William Renshaw	0	0	5	0	1884–1889
5	(France) Jacques Brugnon (France) Henri Cochet	0	**3**	2	0	1926–1932
5	(France) Jean Borotra (France) Jacques Brugnon	1	2	2	0	1928–1934
5	(Australia) John Newcombe (Australia) Tony Roche	2	1	1	1	1965–1967
5	(South Africa) Bob Hewitt (South Africa) Frew McMillan	0	1	3	1	1967–1978
5	(United States) Robert Lutz (United States) Stan Smith	1	0	0	4	1968–1980
5	(Netherlands) Jacco Eltingh (Netherlands) Paul Haarhuis	1	2	1	1	1994–1998
5	(Sweden) Jonas Björkman (Australia) Todd Woodbridge	1	0	3	1	2001–2004
5	(France) Pierre-Hugues Herbert (France) Nicolas Mahut	1	2	1	1	2015–2021
Top 10

== Grand Slam achievements ==
Grasscourt major	Claycourt major	Hardcourt major

=== Grand Slam ===
Players who held all four Grand Slam titles simultaneously (in a calendar year).

Player	Australian Open	French Open	Wimbledon	US Open
(Australia) Ken McGregor	1951	1951	1951	1951
(Australia) Frank Sedgman	1951	1951	1951	1951

=== Non-calendar year Grand Slam ===
Players who held all four Grand Slam titles simultaneously (not in a calendar year).

Player	US Open	Australian Open	French Open	Wimbledon
(United States) Bob Bryan	2012	2013	2013	2013
(United States) Mike Bryan	2012	2013	2013	2013

=== Career Grand Slam ===
Players who won all four Grand Slam titles over the course of their careers.

- The event at which the Career Grand Slam was completed indicated in **bold**.

==== Individual ====
- Tournament at which the Career Grand Slam was completed indicated in **bold**.

Period	Player	Australian Open	French Open	Wimbledon	US Open
Amateur Era	(Australia) Adrian Quist	1936	1935	1935	**1939**
Amateur Era	(Australia) Frank Sedgman	1951	**1951**	1948	1950
Amateur Era	(Australia) Ken McGregor	1951	1951	1951	**1951**
Amateur Era	(Australia) Frank Sedgman (2)	1952	**1952**	1951	1951
Amateur Era	(Australia) Lew Hoad	1953	1953	1953	**1956**
Amateur Era	(Australia) Ken Rosewall	1953	1953	1953	**1956**
Amateur Era	(Australia) Neale Fraser	1957	1958	**1959**	1957
Amateur Era	(Australia) Neale Fraser (2)	1958	1960	**1961**	1960
Amateur Era	(Australia) Roy Emerson	**1962**	1960	1959	1959
Amateur Era	(Australia) Fred Stolle	1963	1965	1962	**1965**
Amateur Era	(Australia) Roy Emerson (2)	**1966**	1961	1961	1960
Amateur Era	(Australia) John Newcombe	1965	1967	1965	**1967**
Amateur Era	(Australia) Tony Roche	1965	1967	1965	**1967**
Open Era	(Australia) Fred Stolle (2)	1964	**1968**	1964	1966
Open Era	(Australia) Ken Rosewall (2)	1956	1968	1956	**1969**
Open Era	(Australia) Roy Emerson (3)	1969	1962	**1971**	1965
Open Era	(Australia) John Newcombe (2)	1967	1969	1966	**1971**
Open Era	(Australia) John Newcombe (3)	1971	1973	1968	**1973**
Open Era	(Australia) / (South Africa) Bob Hewitt	1963	1972	1962	**1977**
Open Era	(Australia) John Fitzgerald	1982	1986	**1989**	1984
Open Era	(Sweden) Anders Järryd	1987	1983	**1989**	1987
Open Era	(Netherlands) Jacco Eltingh	1994	1995	**1998**	1994
Open Era	(Netherlands) Paul Haarhuis	1994	1995	**1998**	1994
Open Era	(Australia) Todd Woodbridge	1992	**2000**	1993	1995
Open Era	(Australia) Mark Woodforde	1992	**2000**	1993	1989
Open Era	(Sweden) Jonas Björkman	1998	**2005**	2002	2003
Open Era	(United States) Bob Bryan	2006	2003	**2006**	2005
Open Era	(United States) Mike Bryan	2006	2003	**2006**	2005
Open Era	(Canada) Daniel Nestor	2002	2007	**2008**	2004
Open Era	(India) Leander Paes	**2012**	1999	1999	2006
Open Era	(United States) Bob Bryan (2)	2007	**2013**	2011	2008
Open Era	(United States) Mike Bryan (2)	2007	**2013**	2011	2008
Open Era	(France) Pierre-Hugues Herbert	**2019**	2018	2016	2015
Open Era	(France) Nicolas Mahut	**2019**	2018	2016	2015
Open Era	(Croatia) Mate Pavić	2018	**2024**	2021	2020

==== Team ====
- Event of completing the Career Grand Slam indicated in **bold**.

Period	Player	Australian Open	French Open	Wimbledon	US Open
Amateur Era	(Australia) Frank Sedgman (Australia) Ken McGregor	1951	1951	1951	**1951**
Amateur Era	(Australia) Ken Rosewall (Australia) Lew Hoad	1953	1953	1953	**1956**
Amateur Era	(Australia) Neale Fraser (Australia) Roy Emerson	**1962**	1960	1959	1959
Amateur Era	(Australia) John Newcombe (Australia) Tony Roche	1965	1967	1965	**1967**
Open Era	(Netherlands) Jacco Eltingh (Netherlands) Paul Haarhuis	1994	1995	**1998**	1994
Open Era	(Australia) Mark Woodforde (Australia) Todd Woodbridge	1992	**2000**	1993	1995
Open Era	(United States) Bob Bryan (United States) Mike Bryan	2006	2003	**2006**	2005
Open Era	(United States) Bob Bryan (2) (United States) Mike Bryan (2)	2007	**2013**	2011	2008
Open Era	(France) Pierre-Hugues Herbert (France) Nicolas Mahut	**2019**	2018	2016	2015

=== Career Golden Slam ===
Players who won all four Grand Slam titles and the Olympic gold medal over the course of their careers.

- The event at which the Career Golden Slam was completed indicated in **bold**.

==== Individual ====
Player	Australian Open	French Open	Wimbledon	US Open	Olympics
(Australia) Mark Woodforde	1992	**2000**	1993	1989	1996
(Australia) Todd Woodbridge	1992	**2000**	1993	1995	1996
(Canada) Daniel Nestor	2002	2007	**2008**	2004	2000
(United States) Bob Bryan	2006	2003	2006	2005	**2012**
(United States) Mike Bryan	2006	2003	2006	2005	**2012**
(Croatia) Mate Pavić	2018	**2024**	2021	2020	2021

==== Team ====
- The event at which the Career Golden Slam was completed indicated in **bold**.

Player	Australian Open	French Open	Wimbledon	US Open	Olympics
(Australia) Mark Woodforde (Australia) Todd Woodbridge	1992	**2000**	1993	1995	1996
(United States) Bob Bryan (United States) Mike Bryan	2006	2003	2006	2005	**2012**

=== Career Super Slam ===
Players who won all four Grand Slam titles, the Olympic gold medal and the Tour Finals over the course of their careers.

- The event at which the Career Super Slam was completed indicated in **bold.**

==== Individual ====
Player	Australian Open	French Open	Wimbledon	US Open	Olympics	Year-end
(Australia) Mark Woodforde	1992	**2000**	1993	1989	1996	1992
(Australia) Todd Woodbridge	1992	**2000**	1993	1995	1996	1992
(Canada) Daniel Nestor	2002	2007	**2008**	2004	2000	2007
(United States) Bob Bryan	2006	2003	2006	2005	**2012**	2003
(United States) Mike Bryan	2006	2003	2006	2005	**2012**	2003

==== Team ====
- The event at which the Career Super Slam was completed indicated in **bold.**

Player	Australian Open	French Open	Wimbledon	US Open	Olympics	Year-end
(Australia) Mark Woodforde (Australia) Todd Woodbridge	1992	**2000**	1993	1995	1996	1992
(United States) Bob Bryan (United States) Mike Bryan	2006	2003	2006	2005	**2012**	2003

=== Career Surface Slam ===
Players who won Grand Slam titles on clay, grass and hard courts iover the course of their careers.

- The event at which the Career Surface Slam was completed indicated in **bold**

==== Individual ====
Player	Clay court slam	Hard court slam	Grass court slam
(Australia) John Fitzgerald	**1986 French Open**	1984 US Open	1982 Australian Open
(United States) Robert Seguso	1987 French Open	1985 US Open	**1987 Wimbledon Championships**
(Sweden) Anders Järryd	1983 French Open	**1987 US Open**	1987 Australian Open
(Sweden) Anders Järryd (2)	1987 French Open	**1991 US Open**	1989 Wimbledon Championships
(Australia) John Fitzgerald (2)	1991 French Open	**1991 US Open**	1989 Wimbledon Championships
(Netherlands) Jacco Eltingh	1995 French Open	1994 Australian Open	**1998 Wimbledon Championships**
(Netherlands) Paul Haarhuis	1995 French Open	1994 Australian Open	**1998 Wimbledon Championships**
(Australia) Mark Woodforde	**2000 French Open**	1989 US Open	1993 Wimbledon Championships
(Australia) Todd Woodbridge	**2000 French Open**	1992 Australian Open	1993 Wimbledon Championships
(India) Mahesh Bhupathi	1999 French Open	**2002 US Open**	1999 Wimbledon Championships
(Sweden) Jonas Björkman	**2005 French Open**	1998 Australian Open	2002 Wimbledon Championships
(United States) Bob Bryan	2003 French Open	2005 US Open	**2006 Wimbledon Championships**
(United States) Mike Bryan	2003 French Open	2005 US Open	**2006 Wimbledon Championships**
(India) Leander Paes	1999 French Open	**2006 US Open**	1999 Wimbledon Championships
(Canada) Daniel Nestor	2007 French Open	2002 Australian Open	**2008 Wimbledon Championships**
(Canada) Daniel Nestor (2)	**2010 French Open**	2004 US Open	2009 Wimbledon Championships
(United States) Bob Bryan (2)	**2013 French Open**	2006 Australian Open	2011 Wimbledon Championships
(United States) Mike Bryan (2)	**2013 French Open**	2006 Australian Open	2011 Wimbledon Championships
(France) Pierre-Hugues Herbert	**2018 French Open**	2015 US Open	2016 Wimbledon Championships
(France) Nicolas Mahut	**2018 French Open**	2015 US Open	2016 Wimbledon Championships
(Netherlands) Jean-Julien Rojer	**2022 French Open**	2017 US Open	2015 Wimbledon Championships
(Croatia) Mate Pavić	**2024 French Open**	2018 Australian Open	2021 Wimbledon Championships

==== Team ====
Player	Clay court slam	Hard court slam	Grass court slam
(Australia) John Fitzgerald (Sweden) Anders Järryd	1991 French Open	**1991 US Open**	1989 Wimbledon Championships
(Netherlands) Jacco Eltingh (Netherlands) Paul Haarhuis	1995 French Open	1994 Australian Open	**1998 Wimbledon Championships**
(Australia) Todd Woodbridge (Australia) Mark Woodforde	**2000 French Open**	1992 Australian Open	1993 Wimbledon Championships
(United States) Bob Bryan (United States) Mike Bryan	2003 French Open	2005 US Open	**2006 Wimbledon Championships**
(United States) Bob Bryan (United States) Mike Bryan (2)	**2013 French Open**	2006 Australian Open	2011 Wimbledon Championships
(France) Pierre-Hugues Herbert (France) Nicolas Mahut	**2018 French Open**	2015 US Open	2016 Wimbledon Championships

== Multiples titles in a season ==
♠ Player won all four major tournaments in the same year.

=== Three titles ===
★ Surface Slam (major titles on 3 different surfaces in the same season). (Note: The US Open switched to hard in 1978, and the Australian Open was played on grass until 1987.)

Australian—French—Wimbledon
1928	(France) Jacques Brugnon
1935	(Australia) Jack Crawford
1951^{♠}	(Australia) Ken McGregor (Australia) Frank Sedgman
1952	(Australia) Ken McGregor (Australia) Frank Sedgman
1953	(Australia) Ken Rosewall (Australia) Lew Hoad
Open Era
1998^{★}	(Netherlands) Jacco Eltingh
2013^{★}	(United States) Bob Bryan (United States) Mike Bryan

Australian—French—U.S.
1951^{♠}	(Australia) Ken McGregor (Australia) Frank Sedgman
1967	(Australia) Tony Roche (Australia) John Newcombe
Open Era
1973	(Australia) John Newcombe
1987	(Sweden) Anders Järryd

Australian—Wimbledon—U.S.
1950	(Australia) John Bromwich
1951^{♠}	(Australia) Ken McGregor (Australia) Frank Sedgman
1956	(Australia) Ken Rosewall (Australia) Lew Hoad

French—Wimbledon—U.S.
1931	(United States) John Van Ryn
1951^{♠}	(Australia) Ken McGregor (Australia) Frank Sedgman
Open Era
1991^{★}	(Sweden) Anders Järryd (Australia) John Fitzgerald

=== Two titles ===
● Three-Quarter Slam (3 major titles in the same year).
‡ Channel Slam (French and Wimbledon title double).

Australian—French
1928	(France) Jacques Brugnon^{●} (France) Jean Borotra
1935^{●}	(Australia) Jack Crawford
1951^{♠}	(Australia) Ken McGregor (Australia) Frank Sedgman
1952	(Australia) Ken McGregor (Australia) Frank Sedgman
1953^{●}	(Australia) Ken Rosewall (Australia) Lew Hoad
1955	(United States) Vic Seixas (United States) Tony Trabert
1958	(Australia) Ashley Cooper (Australia) Neale Fraser
1961	(Australia) Rod Laver
1962	(Australia) Roy Emerson (Australia) Neale Fraser
1967^{●}	(Australia) Tony Roche (Australia) John Newcombe
Open Era
1973^{●}	(Australia) John Newcombe
1987^{●}	(Sweden) Anders Järryd
1998^{●}	(Netherlands) Jacco Eltingh
2013^{●}	(United States) Bob Bryan (United States) Mike Bryan

Australian—Wimbledon
1912	(United Kingdom) Charles Dixon
1919	(Australia) Pat O'Hara Wood (Australia) Ron Thomas
1928^{●}	(France) Jacques Brugnon
1935^{●}	(Australia) Jack Crawford
1948	(Australia) John Bromwich
1950	(Australia) Adrian Quist (Australia) John Bromwich^{●}
1951^{♠}	(Australia) Ken McGregor (Australia) Frank Sedgman
1952	(Australia) Ken McGregor (Australia) Frank Sedgman
1953^{●}	(Australia) Ken Rosewall (Australia) Lew Hoad
1954	(Australia) Rex Hartwig (Australia) Mervyn Rose
1956^{●}	(Australia) Ken Rosewall (Australia) Lew Hoad
1964	(Australia) Bob Hewitt (Australia) Fred Stolle
1965	(Australia) John Newcombe (Australia) Tony Roche
Open Era
1997	(Australia) Todd Woodbridge (Australia) Mark Woodforde
1998^{●}	(Netherlands) Jacco Eltingh
2006	(United States) Bob Bryan (United States) Mike Bryan
2011	(United States) Bob Bryan (United States) Mike Bryan
2013^{●}	(United States) Bob Bryan (United States) Mike Bryan

Australian—U.S.
1939	(Australia) John Bromwich (Australia) Adrian Quist
1949	(Australia) John Bromwich
1950^{●}	(Australia) John Bromwich
1951^{♠}	(Australia) Ken McGregor (Australia) Frank Sedgman
1956^{●}	(Australia) Ken Rosewall (Australia) Lew Hoad
1957	(Australia) Neale Fraser
1966	(Australia) Roy Emerson (Australia) Fred Stolle
1967^{●}	(Australia) Tony Roche (Australia) John Newcombe
Open Era
1971	(Australia) John Newcombe
1973^{●}	(Australia) John Newcombe
1987	(Sweden) Anders Järryd^{●} (Sweden) Stefan Edberg
1990	(South Africa) Pieter Aldrich (South Africa) Danie Visser
1994	(Netherlands) Jacco Eltingh (Netherlands) Paul Haarhuis
2010	(United States) Bob Bryan (United States) Mike Bryan
2016	(United Kingdom) Jamie Murray (Brazil) Bruno Soares
2026	(United States) Christian Harrison (United Kingdom) Neal Skupski

French—Wimbledon ‡
1925	(France) Jean Borotra (France) René Lacoste
1928^{●}	(France) Jacques Brugnon
1931	(United States) John Van Ryn^{●} (United States) George Lott
1932	(France) Jacques Brugnon
1935	(Australia) Jack Crawford^{●} (Australia) Adrian Quist
1949	(United States) Pancho Gonzales (United States) Frank Parker
1951^{♠}	(Australia) Ken McGregor (Australia) Frank Sedgman
1952	(Australia) Ken McGregor (Australia) Frank Sedgman
1953^{●}	(Australia) Ken Rosewall (Australia) Lew Hoad
1961	(Australia) Roy Emerson
Open Era
1969	(Australia) John Newcombe (Australia) Tony Roche
1972	(South Africa) Bob Hewitt (South Africa) Frew McMillan
1991^{●}	(Sweden) Anders Järryd (Australia) John Fitzgerald
1998	(Netherlands) Jacco Eltingh^{●} (Netherlands) Paul Haarhuis
1999	(India) Mahesh Bhupathi (India) Leander Paes
2000	(Australia) Todd Woodbridge (Australia) Mark Woodforde
2013^{●}	(United States) Bob Bryan (United States) Mike Bryan

French—U.S.
1926	(United States) Vincent Richards
1931	(United States) John Van Ryn
1937	(Germany) Gottfried von Cramm (Germany) Henner Henkel
1951^{♠}	(Australia) Ken McGregor (Australia) Frank Sedgman
1954	(United States) Vic Seixas (United States) Tony Trabert
1957	(Australia) Ashley Cooper
1960	(Australia) Roy Emerson (Australia) Neale Fraser
1965	(Australia) Roy Emerson (Australia) Fred Stolle
1967^{●}	(Australia) Tony Roche (Australia) John Newcombe
Open Era
1973^{●}	(Australia) John Newcombe
1987^{●}	(Sweden) Anders Järryd
1988	(Spain) Emilio Sánchez
1991^{●}	(Sweden) Anders Järryd (Australia) John Fitzgerald
1997	(Russia) Yevgeny Kafelnikov (Czech Republic) Daniel Vacek
2009	(Czech Republic) Lukáš Dlouhý (India) Leander Paes
2025	(Spain) Marcel Granollers (Argentina) Horacio Zeballos

Wimbledon—U.S.
1903	(United Kingdom) Laurence Doherty (United Kingdom) Reginald Doherty
1927	(United States) Frank Hunter (United States) Bill Tilden
1931^{●}	(United States) John Van Ryn
1934	(United States) George Lott (United States) Lester Stoefen
1938	(United States) Don Budge (United States) Gene Mako
1947	(United States) Jack Kramer
1950^{●}	(Australia) John Bromwich
1951^{♠}	(Australia) Ken McGregor (Australia) Frank Sedgman
1956^{●}	(Australia) Ken Rosewall (Australia) Lew Hoad
1959	(Australia) Roy Emerson (Australia) Neale Fraser
Open Era
1979	(United States) Peter Fleming (United States) John McEnroe
1981	(United States) Peter Fleming (United States) John McEnroe
1983	(United States) Peter Fleming (United States) John McEnroe
1991^{●}	(Sweden) Anders Järryd (Australia) John Fitzgerald
1995	(Australia) Todd Woodbridge (Australia) Mark Woodforde
1996	(Australia) Todd Woodbridge (Australia) Mark Woodforde
2003	(Sweden) Jonas Björkman (Australia) Todd Woodbridge
2018	(United States) Mike Bryan (United States) Jack Sock
2019	(Colombia) Juan Sebastián Cabal (Colombia) Robert Farah

== Tournament stats ==
=== Most titles per tournament ===
Tournament	Titles	Player(s)
Australian Open	10	(Australia) Adrian Quist
French Open	6	(Australia) Roy Emerson
Wimbledon	9	(Australia) Todd Woodbridge
US Open	6	(United States) Richard Sears
US Open	6	(United States) Holcombe Ward
US Open	6	(United States) Mike Bryan

== Most consecutive titles ==
AO Australian Open	WIM Wimbledon
FO French Open	USO US Open

=== Overall record ===
==== Per player ====
Titles	Player	First event	Last event
8	(Australia) Frank Sedgman	1950 USO	1952 WIM
7	(Australia) Ken McGregor	1951 AO	1952 WIM
4	(United States) Bob Bryan	2012 USO	2013 WIM
4	(United States) Mike Bryan	2012 USO	2013 WIM

==== Per team ====
Titles	Player	First event	Last event
7	(Australia) Ken McGregor (Australia) Frank Sedgman	1951 AO	1952 WIM
4	(United States) Bob Bryan (United States) Mike Bryan	2012 USO	2013 WIM

=== At one tournament ===
==== Per player ====
Titles	Player	Tourn.	Years
10	(Australia) Adrian Quist	AO	1936–50 (Note: Ongoing streak, interrupted by World War II.)
8	(Australia) John Bromwich	AO	1938–50
6	(United States) Richard Sears	USO	1882–87
6	(Australia) Roy Emerson	FO	1960–65
5	(United Kingdom) Laurence Doherty	WIM	1897–01
5	(United Kingdom) Reginald Doherty	WIM	1897–01
5	(Australia) Todd Woodbridge	WIM	1993–97
5	(Australia) Mark Woodforde	WIM	1993–97

==== Per team ====
Titles	Team	Tourn.	Years
8	(Australia) Adrian Quist (Australia) John Bromwich	AO	1938–50
5	(United Kingdom) Laurence Doherty (United Kingdom) Reginald Doherty	WIM	1897–01
5	(Australia) Todd Woodbridge (Australia) Mark Woodforde	WIM	1993–97

== Grand slam titles by decade ==
as of 2026 US Open.

1880s

6	Sears

5	Dwight, E. Renshaw, W. Renshaw

1	Bowes-Lyon, O. Campbell, C. Clark, J. Clark, Hall, Slocum, F. Taylor, H. Taylor, Wilberforce

1890s

4	H. Baddeley, W. Baddeley

3	L. Doherty, R. Doherty, Hobart

2	O. Campbell, Hovey, Huntington, Pim, Sheldon, Stoker, Ware

1	Barlow, Chace, D. Davis, Hall, Lewis, C. Neel, S. Neel, Ward, Wrenn

1900s

7	L. Doherty, R. Doherty

5	Ward

4	F. Alexander

3	Hackett, Wilding, Wright

2	D. Davis, Riseley, S.H. Smith

1	Barrett, Brookes, A. Dunlop, Gore, Gregg, Heath, Keane, Lycett, E. Parker, H. Parker, Ritchie, Tachell

1910s

3	Bundy, Dixon, McLoughlin

2	F. Alexander, Barrett, Brookes, A. Campbell, Griffin, Johnston, O'Hara Wood, Patterson, Rice, Thomas, Wilding

1	Decugis, Gobert, Hackett, Heath, Hedeman, Little, Lycett, Parke, E. Parker, Richards, Ritchie, Throckmorton, Tilden, Todd, Touchard

1920s

6	Richards

5	Borotra, Brugnon, Tilden

4	Patterson

3	Cochet, Hawkes, Hunter, Lacoste, Lycett, O'Hara Wood, Williams

2	J. Anderson, H. Kinsey, Lott

1	Allison, Brookes, Crawford, Doeg, Eaton, Garland, Gemmell, Godfree, Griffin, Hennessey, Hopman, Johnston, R. Kinsey, Norton, St. John, Thomas, Van Ryn, Woosnam

1930s

7	Quist

6	Lott

5	Brugnon, Crawford, Van Ryn

4	Borotra, Budge, Mako

3	Allison, Bromwich, Hughes, Stoefen

2	Cochet, Gledhill, Henkel, F. Perry, Turnbull, Vines, von Cramm

1	Bernard, Cooke, Destremau, Doeg, Donohoe, R. Dunlop, Harris, Hopman, McGrath, McNeill, Moon, Petra, Riggs, Tuckey

1940s

7	Bromwich

6	Kramer

5	Quist

4	Mulloy, Talbert

3	F. Parker, Schroeder

2	Falkenburg, Gonzales

1	Bergelin, Bernard, Brown, Drobný, Fannin, McNeill, Petra, Sedgman, Sidwell, Sturgess

1950s

8	Hoad, Sedgman

7	McGregor

6	Fraser, Rosewall

5	Seixas, Trabert

4	Cooper, Hartwig, Rose

3	Bromwich

2	Emerson, Quist

1	M. Anderson, Candy, S. Davidson, Kamo, Laver, Mark, Miyagi, Mulloy, Olmedo, Patty, B. Perry, Pietrangeli, Richardson, Schmidt, Sirola, Talbert

1960s

13	Emerson

10	F. Stolle

9	Newcombe

8	Roche

5	Fraser, B. Hewitt, Ralston

4	Laver

3	McKinley, Osuna

2	Fletcher, Mark, Palafox, Rosewall

1	Crealy, Graebner, Lutz, McMillan, Santana, S. Smith, Stone

1970s

8	Newcombe

5	Roche

4	B. Hewitt, McMillan

3	Gottfried, Lutz, Năstase, Ramírez, S. Smith

2	Ashe, Case, Connors, O. Davidson, Fleming, Masters, G. Mayer, S. Mayer, J. McEnroe, Okker, Riessen, R. Taylor

1	J. Alexander, M. Anderson, Barthès, Crealy, Dent, Drysdale, Emerson, Fibak, Gerulaitis, Laver, McNair, McNamara, McNamee, Parun, Pfister, Pilić, Rosewall, Ruffels, Stewart, Stone, Țiriac, Warwick

1980s

6	J. McEnroe

5	Edmondson, Fleming, Järryd

4	Fitzgerald, Seguso

3	Flach, McNamee, Warwick

2	Edberg, Gómez, Günthardt, Leach, McNamara, Pugh, Sánchez, Šmíd, Stewart, Taróczy

1	J. Alexander, Amaya, Annacone, Casal, Curren, Denton, Grabb, Leconte, Lutz, P. McEnroe, Noah, Nyström, Pfister, Simonsson, S. Smith, Taygan, van Rensburg, Wilander, Woodforde, Živojinović

1990s

9	Woodbridge, Woodforde

6	Eltingh

5	Haarhuis

3	Fitzgerald, Järryd, Kafelnikov, Vacek, Visser

2	Aldrich, Bhupathi, Björkman, Leach, Paes, Reneberg

1	B. Black, Casal, S. Davis, Edberg, Flach, Grabb, Hlasek, L. Jensen, M. Jensen, Korda, Lareau, J. McEnroe, O'Brien, Palmer, Pate, Pugh, Rafter, Rosset, Sánchez, Stark, Stich, S. Stolle, Suk, Warder

2000s

7	Björkman, B. Bryan, M. Bryan, Woodbridge

5	Nestor

4	Mirnyi, Paes

3	Knowles, Llodra

2	Bhupathi, W. Black, Dlouhý, Santoro, Ullyett, Woodforde, Zimonjić

1	Aspelin, Clément, Cuevas, Damm, Erlich, Ferreira, Haarhuis, L. Hewitt, Horna, Huss, Johnson, Kafelnikov, Knowle, Leach, Malisse, Moodie, Palmer, A. Ram, Rochus

2010s

11	M. Bryan

9	B. Bryan

4	Herbert, Mahut

3	Nestor, Sock

2	Cabal, Farah, Kubot, Melo, Melzer, Mirnyi, J. Murray, Paes, Petzschner, Rojer, Soares, Štěpánek, Tecău

1	Benneteau, Bolelli, Dodig, Fognini, R. Harrison, Kontinen, Krawietz, Lindstedt, F. López, M. López, Marach, Marray, Mies, Nielsen, Pavić, Peers, Pospisil, Roger-Vasselin, Venus, Zimonjić

2020s

4	R. Ram, Salisbury

3	Granollers, Heliövaara, Patten, Pavić, Skupski, Zeballos

2	Arévalo, Dodig, Ebden, C. Harrison, Purcell

1	Bopanna, Cash, Glasspool, Herbert, Hijikata, Kokkinakis, Koolhof, Krajicek, Krawietz, Kubler, Kyrgios, Mahut, Mektić, Mies, Polášek, Rojer, Soares, Thompson

== Grand Slam titles by country ==
Note: Titles, won by a team of players from same country, count as one title, not two.

=== All-time ===
as of 2026 US Open.

171	United States (108 players)

164	Australia (75 players)

55	Great Britain (33 players)

28	France (19 players)

23	Sweden (11 players)

15	South Africa (12 players)

13	Czechoslovakia / Czech Republic (8 players), Netherlands (5 players)

10	Canada (3 players), India (3 players)

8	New Zealand (4 players), Spain (6 players)

7	Croatia (3 players), Germany (6 players)

6	Belarus (1 player), Mexico (3 players)

5	Brazil (2 players), Romania (3 players), Yugoslavia / Serbia (3 players)

4	Austria (3 players), Finland (2 players), Russia (1 player)

3	Argentina (1 player), Bahamas (1 player), Poland (2 players), Switzerland (3 players), Zimbabwe (3 players)

2	Colombia (2 players), Ecuador (1 player), El Salvador (1 player), Hungary (1 player), Italy (4 players)

1	Belgium (2 players), Denmark, Israel (2 players), Japan (2 players), Peru, Slovakia, Uruguay

=== Open Era ===
as of 2026 US Open.

75	United States (40 players)

66	Australia (35 players)

21	Sweden (8 players)

16	Great Britain (8 players)

13	Netherlands (5 players)

12	Czechoslovakia / Czech Republic (7 players), South Africa (9 players)

11	France (10 players)

10	Canada (3 players), India (3 players)

7	Croatia (3 players), Spain (5 players)

6	Belarus (1 player)

5	Brazil (2 players), Germany (4 players), Romania (3 players), Yugoslavia / Serbia (3 players)

4	Austria (3 players), Finland (2 players), Russia (1 player)

3	Argentina (1 player), Bahamas (1 player), Mexico (1 player), Poland (2 players), Switzerland (3 players), Zimbabwe (3 players)

2	Colombia (2 players), Ecuador (1 player), El Salvador (1 player), Hungary (1 player), New Zealand (2 players)

1	Belgium (2 players), Denmark, Israel (2 players), Italy (2 players), Peru, Slovakia, Uruguay

== See also ==
- Lists of tennis records and statistics
- List of Grand Slam and related tennis records
- List of Grand Slam men's singles champions
- List of Grand Slam women's singles champions
- List of Grand Slam women's doubles champions
- List of Grand Slam mixed doubles champions
- List of ATP Big Titles doubles champions
