= 1901 Wimbledon Championships – Men's doubles =

Men's doubles
- 1901 Wimbledon Championships

Final
- Champions: (United Kingdom) Laurence Doherty (United Kingdom) Reginald Doherty
- Runners-up: (United States) Dwight Davis (United States) Holcombe Ward
- Score: 4–6, 6–2, 6–3, 9–7

Details
- Draw: 19
- Seeds: –

Events
Singles	men	women
Doubles	men	women
← 1900 ·	Wimbledon Championships	· 1902 →

Dwight Davis and Holcombe Ward defeated Herbert Roper Barrett and George Simond 7–5, 6–4, 6–4 in the All Comers' Final, but the reigning champions Laurence Doherty and Reginald Doherty defeated Davis and Ward 4–6, 6–2, 6–3, 9–7 in the challenge round to win the gentlemen's doubles tennis title at the 1901 Wimbledon Championships.

== Draw ==
=== Key ===
- Q = Qualifier
- WC = Wild card
- LL = Lucky loser
- Alt = Alternate
- SE = Special exempt
- PR = Protected ranking
- ITF = ITF entry
- JE = Junior exempt
- w/o = Walkover
- r = Retired
- d = Defaulted
- SR = Special ranking

=== Challenge round ===
Challenge Round
(United States) Dwight Davis (United States) Holcombe Ward	6	2	3	7
(United Kingdom) Laurence Doherty (United Kingdom) Reginald Doherty	4	6	6	9

=== All comers' finals ===
Semifinals
(United Kingdom) Clement Cazalet (United Kingdom) Sydney Smith	2	3	6	1
(United Kingdom) Herbert Roper Barrett (United Kingdom) George Simond	6	6	2	6
(United Kingdom) HW Davies (United Kingdom) Reginald Gamble	3	3	3
(United States) Dwight Davis (United States) Holcombe Ward	6	6	6

Final
(United Kingdom) Herbert Roper Barrett (United Kingdom) George Simond	5	4	4
(United States) Dwight Davis (United States) Holcombe Ward	7	6	6

=== Top half ===
First round
(United Kingdom) Herbert Roper Barrett (United Kingdom) George Simond	6	6	6
(United Kingdom) Walter Crawley (United Kingdom) Philip Pearson	1	1	0
(United Kingdom) Walter Bailey (United Kingdom) JF Martin	6	6	6
F Japi (United Kingdom) Allan Pearson	1	3	4

Second round
(United Kingdom) George Greville (United Kingdom) CH Martin	7	6	6
(United Kingdom) Capt. Barton (United Kingdom) Dr. Barton	5	1	0
(United Kingdom) Clement Cazalet (United Kingdom) Sydney Smith	8	6	9	6
(United Kingdom) Charles Dixon (United Kingdom) Major Ritchie	6	4	11	2
(United Kingdom) Harold Mahony (United Kingdom) Arthur Norris	6	6	6
(United Kingdom) Arthur Stanley (United Kingdom) H Wilson	3	3	4
(United Kingdom) HR Barrett (United Kingdom) G Simond	6	6	6
(United Kingdom) W Bailey (United Kingdom) JF Martin	2	2	3

Quarterfinals
(United Kingdom) G Greville (United Kingdom) CH Martin	4	6	1	2
(United Kingdom) C Cazalet (United Kingdom) S Smith	6	4	6	6
(United Kingdom) H Mahony (United Kingdom) A Norris	2	2	2
(United Kingdom) HR Barrett (United Kingdom) G Simond	6	6	6

Semifinals
(United Kingdom) C Cazalet (United Kingdom) S Smith	2	3	6	1
(United Kingdom) HR Barrett (United Kingdom) G Simond	6	6	2	6

The nationality of F Japi is unknown.

=== Bottom half ===
First round
(United Kingdom) HW Davies (United Kingdom) Reginald Gamble	6	6	6
(United Kingdom) Sydney Adams (United Kingdom) Robert Hough	4	4	2

Second round
(United Kingdom) HW Davies (United Kingdom) R Gamble	6	6	6
(United Kingdom) Gillibrand Evered (United Kingdom) B Wood Hill	4	1	4
(United Kingdom) Arthur Gore (United Kingdom) HM Sweetman	6	4	6	7
(United Kingdom) Neville Durlacher (United Kingdom) Roderick McNair	2	6	4	5
(United Kingdom) David Hawes (United Kingdom) Capt. Young	6	6	6
(United Kingdom) A Raleigh (United Kingdom) AW Andrews	4	3	1
(United States) Dwight Davis (United States) Holcombe Ward	3	6	11	9
(United Kingdom) Wilberforce Eaves (United Kingdom) George Hillyard	6	3	9	7

Quarterfinals
(United Kingdom) HW Davies (United Kingdom) R Gamble	4	6	1	6	6
(United Kingdom) A Gore (United Kingdom) HM Sweetman	6	3	6	3	4
(United Kingdom) D Hawes (United Kingdom) Capt. Young	4	4	3
(United States) D Davis (United States) H Ward	6	6	6

Semifinals
(United Kingdom) HW Davies (United Kingdom) R Gamble	3	3	3
(United States) D Davis (United States) H Ward	6	6	6
