= Ralph Gamble =

Ralph Gamble may refer to:

- Ralph A. Gamble (1885–1959), Republican member of the United States House of Representatives from New York
- Ralph Dominic Gamble (1897–1918), British Army officer
