= Reginald Gamble =

English tennis player

Sir Reginald Gamble
- Full name: Reginald Arthur Gamble
- Born: 1862; Auckland, New Zealand
- Died: 7 July 1930 (aged 67–68); Kensington, London, England
- Turned pro: 1881 (amateur)
- Retired: 1913

Singles
- Career record: 51–26
- Career titles: 8

Grand Slam singles results
- Wimbledon: QF (1892)

Doubles

Grand Slam doubles results
- Wimbledon: SF (1901)

Sir Reginald Arthur Gamble (1862 – 7 July 1930) was an English civil servant and tennis player. He was a quarter-finalist in singles at the 1892 Wimbledon Championships, and semi finalist in doubles in 1901. He was active from 1881 to 1913 and won 8 singles titles.

== Early life and family ==
Born in Auckland, New Zealand, in 1862, Gamble was the son of Major General Dominic Jacotin Gamble and Mary Eleanor McNair. His father was posted to New Zealand during the New Zealand Wars.

== Tennis career ==
Gamble played his first tournament in 1881 at the South of England Championships. He won his first title at the 1884 Scottish Championships. He won his final title at the 1903 Punjab Championships. He played his final tournament at the 1913 Wimbledon Championships.

== Civil service career ==
Gamble attended Balliol College at the University of Oxford from 1881 to 1884. He joined the Indian Civil Service in 1881, and had a long career, retiring in 1918. He worked for a further four years in China before returning to England.

On 21 February 1917, Gamble was appointed a Knight Bachelor. He died in 1930.
