= 1898 U.S. National Championships (tennis) =

- Date: August 15–22 (M); June 14–18 (W)
- Edition: 18th
- Category: Grand Slam
- Surface: Grass
- Location: Newport, R.I., United States (M); Philadelphia, PA, United States (W)

Champions

Men's singles
- (United States) Malcolm Whitman

Women's singles
- (United States) Juliette Atkinson

Men's doubles
- (United States) Leo Ware / (United States) George Sheldon

Women's doubles
- (United States) Juliette Atkinson / (United States) Kathleen Atkinson

Mixed doubles
- (United States) Carrie Neely / (United States) Edwin P. Fischer
- U.S. National Championships

The 1898 U.S. National Championships (now known as the US Open) was a tennis tournament that took place in June and August of 1898. The women's tournament was held from June 14 to June 18 on the outdoor grass courts at the Philadelphia Cricket Club in Philadelphia, Pennsylvania. The men's tournament was held from August 15 to August 22 on the outdoor grass courts at the Newport Casino in Newport, Rhode Island. It was the 18th U.S. National Championships and the second Grand Slam tournament of the year.

== Finals ==
=== Men's singles ===
(United States) Malcolm Whitman defeated (United States) Dwight F. Davis 3–6, 6–2, 6–2, 6–1

=== Women's singles ===
(United States) Juliette Atkinson defeated (United States) Marion Jones 6–3, 5–7, 6–4, 2–6, 7–5

=== Men's doubles ===
(United States) Leo Ware / (United States) George Sheldon defeated (United States) Holcombe Ward / (United States) Dwight Davis 1–6, 7–5, 6–4, 4–6, 7–5

=== Women's doubles ===
(United States) Juliette Atkinson / (United States) Kathleen Atkinson defeated (United States) Marie Wimer / (United States) Carrie Neely 6–1, 2–6, 4–6, 6–1, 6–2

=== Mixed doubles ===
(United States) Carrie Neely / (United States) Edwin P. Fischer defeated (United States) Helen Chapman / (United States) J.A. Hill 6–2, 6–4, 8–6

Preceded by 1898 Wimbledon Championships	Grand Slams	Succeeded by 1899 Wimbledon Championships
