= 1901 Wimbledon Championships =

- Date: 24 June – 3 July
- Edition: 25th
- Category: Grand Slam
- Surface: Grass
- Location: Worple Road; SW19, Wimbledon, London, United Kingdom
- Venue: All England Lawn Tennis and Croquet Club

Champions

Men's singles
- (United Kingdom of Great Britain and Ireland) Arthur Gore

Women's singles
- (United Kingdom of Great Britain and Ireland) Charlotte Sterry

Men's doubles
- (United Kingdom of Great Britain and Ireland) Laurence Doherty / (United Kingdom of Great Britain and Ireland) Reginald Doherty
- Wimbledon Championships

The 1901 Wimbledon Championships took place on the outdoor grass courts at the All England Lawn Tennis and Croquet Club in Wimbledon, London, United Kingdom. The tournament ran from 24 June until 3 July. It was the 25th staging of the Wimbledon Championships, and the first Grand Slam tennis event of 1901. There was a record entry of thirty competitors in the women's singles.

This was the first Wimbledon tournament during the reign of King Edward VII.

== Champions ==
=== Men's singles ===
(United Kingdom of Great Britain and Ireland) Arthur Gore defeated (United Kingdom of Great Britain and Ireland) Reginald Doherty 4–6, 7–5, 6–4, 6–4

=== Women's singles ===
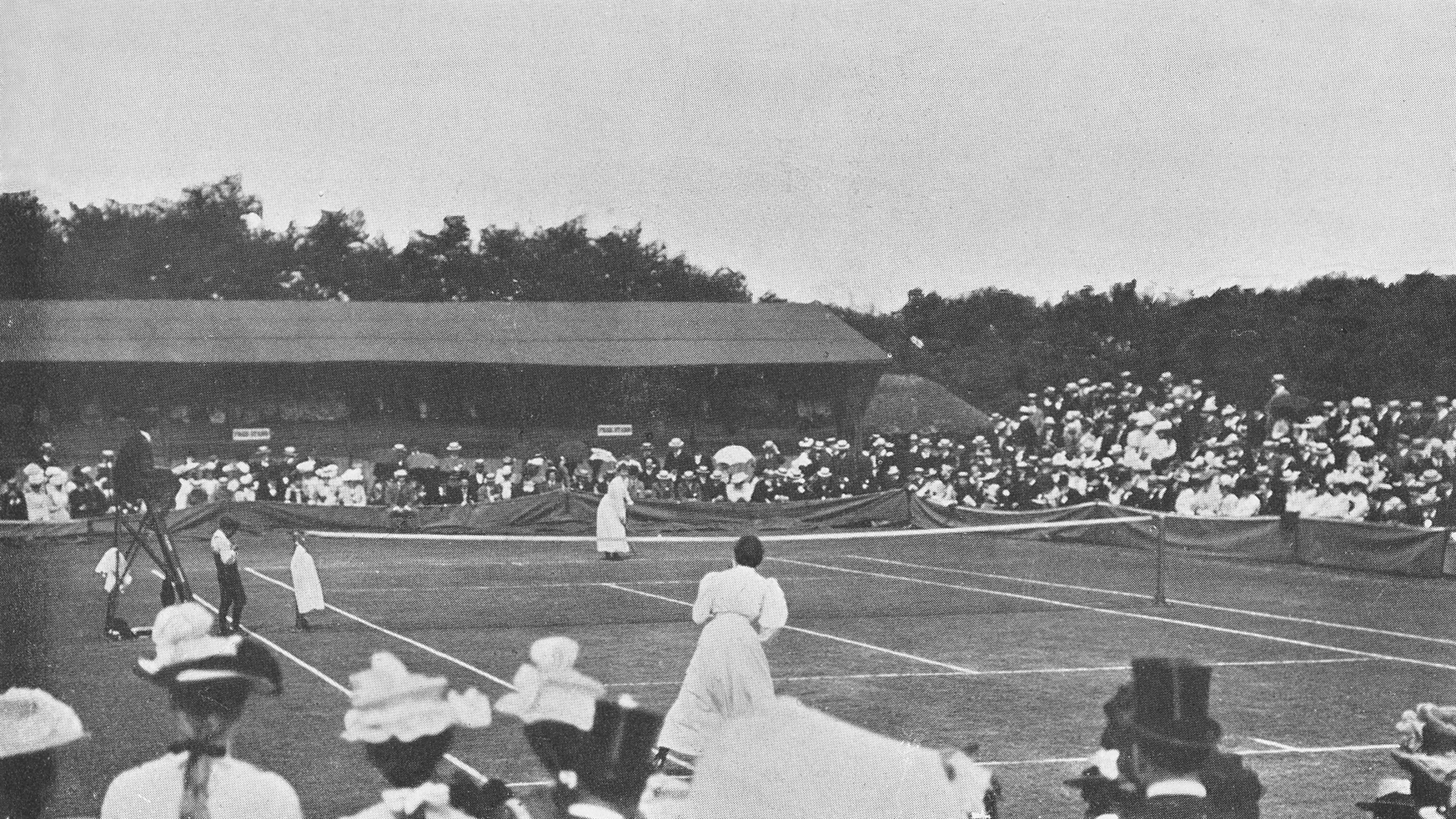
Women's singles final between Blanche Bingley Hillyard and Charlotte Cooper Sterry.

(United Kingdom of Great Britain and Ireland) Charlotte Sterry defeated (United Kingdom of Great Britain and Ireland) Blanche Hillyard 6–2, 6–2

=== Men's doubles ===
(United Kingdom of Great Britain and Ireland) Laurence Doherty / (United Kingdom of Great Britain and Ireland) Reginald Doherty defeated (United States) Dwight Davis / (United States) Holcombe Ward 4–6, 6–2, 6–3, 9–7

Preceded by 1900 U.S. National Championships	Grand Slams	Succeeded by 1901 U.S. National Championships
