= Dominic Jacotin Gamble =

British Army officer

Major-General Dominic Jacotin Gamble CB
- Born: 15 August 1823; Ireland
- Died: 21 November 1887 (aged 64); Kensington, London, England
- Military career
- Allegiance: United Kingdom
- Branch: British Army
- Rank: Major-General
- Awards: CB
- Other work: Director-Gen. of Military Education

Dominic Jacotin Gamble CB (15 August 1823 – 21 November 1887) was a British Army officer from 1844 until his death in 1887. He played a significant role in the New Zealand wars under Lieutenant General Duncan Cameron and the 4th Foot Regiment.

== Family background ==
Gamble was born in Ireland on 15 August 1823. Nothing is known of his family or early years.

He was the father of Brigadier-General Richard Narrien Gamble C.B. (1860–) and Sir Reginald Arthur Gamble, Kt (1862–).

== Early career ==
Gamble was first commissioned (brevet) as an ensign in the 4th Foot Regiment in 1844 and then as a lieutenant was posted at ‘Maker Barracks’ Vaulters Home Maker, St Germans in Cornwall where he passed his exam in native languages (on 26 January 1847) and worked to become captain and to serve in Turkey between 1854 and 1855, and was with the 4th Regiment in the Crimean Campaign in 1855, after which he was decorated (receiving a medal with clasp, and the Turkish medal in 1856) and promoted to the rank of major.

== Family ==
Possibly while attending the British Army's recently established staff college at Farnborough he met Mary Eleanor, daughter of Benjamin Macnair and Mary Rennie Miller of Greenfields. They married on 23 June 1859 at Falkirk, Stirlingshire in Scotland and the couple subsequently had three children, two boys Richard (in 1860) and Reginald (1862) and later a daughter (1864 in Auckland New Zealand).

== New Zealand Wars ==
From 1861 as Lieutenant-Colonel he took up the post of Deputy Quartermaster-General (DQMG) in New Zealand on the staff of Lieutenant General Duncan Cameron responsible, in conjunction with the commissariat department, for arranging supplies for the British forces. Over the following six years he also acted as an unofficial chief of staff for Cameron and, later, for Major General Trevor Chute, performing a wide range of tasks and acting as the central point for the receipt of reports for the general officer commanding and for the dispatch of his orders to subordinates (where he was repeatedly being mentioned in dispatches).

Gamble was praised by Cameron for the part he played in preparations for an invasion of Waikato — setting up camps for some 10,000 British troops in South Auckland and organising the construction of the Great South Road between 1862 and 1863 — and in recognition of his services during the campaign was granted CB in 1864. Then for the War Office as brevet lieutenant-colonel in 1865 before receiving the rank of brevet colonel. He further served in the campaigns at Tauranga, Gate Pa, Wanganui and South Taranaki all for which on the 6 February 1866 he was made colonel and awarded another medal.

He returned to England and was then governor of the viceroy of Egypt's son in England between 1868 and 1869, before becoming major-general in 1870 and knight of the Egyptian Order of the Medjidie (3rd Class). He was made assistant-quartermaster-general at Aldershot from 1869 to 1874, and made Lieutenant-Colonel of brigade depot from 1876.

== British West Indies ==
After he was promoted to major-general (1877) he arrived at Barbados on 1 October 1878 and took command of British forces in the West Indies and even held the post as Deputy Governor of Barbados and the Windward Islands during 1880.

Returning to England, he was appointed director-general of military education in 1887, but, aged 64, Gamble died at South Kensington, London, on 21 November 1887.
