= Leo Ware =

American tennis player

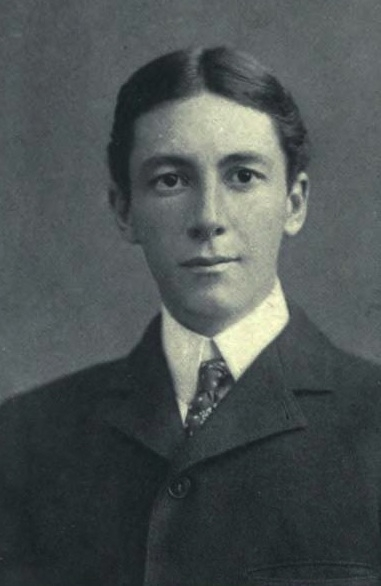
- Full name: Leonard Everett Ware
- Country (sports): United States
- Born: September 27, 1876; Roxbury, MA, U.S.
- Died: December 28, 1914 (aged 38); Elizabeth, NJ, U.S.
- Turned pro: 1893 (amateur tour)
- Retired: 1902
- Plays: Right-handed (one-handed backhand)
- College: Harvard University

Singles
- Highest ranking: No.2 (U.S. ranking)

Grand Slam singles results
- US Open: SF (1897, 1898, 1899, 1901)

Doubles

Grand Slam doubles results
- US Open: W (1897, 1898)

Leonard Everett Ware (September 27, 1876 – December 28, 1914) was an American male tennis player of Canadian origin. He won two titles in the men's doubles competition at the U.S. National Championships played at the Newport Casino, and reached the semifinals of the singles four times.

Ware won the interscholastic championship held in Newport, representing Roxbury Latin School. He graduated from Harvard University in 1899 and represented Harvard in the intercollegiate tennis tournament, winning in the men's doubles in 1896, 1897 and 1898 and in the singles in 1898.

He won the Canadian Championships in 1897, beating Edwin P. Fischer in the final, and again in 1898, defeating Malcolm Whitman in the final. In March 1898 he won the inaugural edition of the U.S. National Indoor Tennis Championships, held in Newton Centre, after defeating Holcombe Ward in the final in three straight sets.

In 1896 he was ranked for the first time in the U.S. top 10 and in 1898 achieved his highest U.S. ranking of No.2 behind Malcolm Whitman.

After his tennis career he became a banker and held several positions in the banking industry in Boston and New York where he worked at the firm Mann, Bill & Ware. Om April 19, 1904 he married Margaret Newcomb and the couple had three children. He died of pneumonia after a brief illness on December 28, 1914.

== Grand Slam finals ==
=== Doubles: 4 (2 titles, 2 runners-up) ===
Result	Year	Championship	Surface	Partner	Opponents	Score
Win	1897	U.S. Championships	Grass	(United States) George Sheldon	(United Kingdom of Great Britain and Ireland) Harold Mahony (United Kingdom of Great Britain and Ireland) Harold Nisbet	11–13, 6–2, 9–7, 1–6, 6–1
Win	1898	U.S. Championships	Grass	(United States) George Sheldon	(United States) Holcombe Ward (United States) Dwight Davis	1–6, 7–5, 6–4, 4–6, 7–5
Loss	1899	U.S. Championships	Grass	(United States) George Sheldon	(United States) Holcombe Ward (United States) Dwight F. Davis	4–6, 4–6, 3–6
Loss	1901	U.S. Championships	Grass	(United States) Beals Wright	(United States) Holcombe Ward (United States) Dwight F. Davis	3–6, 7–9, 1–6
