= George Sheldon (tennis) =

American tennis player

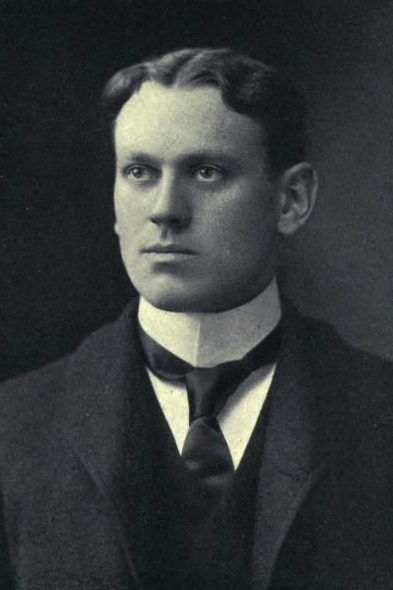
- Full name: George Preston Sheldon, Jr.
- Country (sports): United States
- Born: November 19, 1876; Brooklyn, New York, United States
- Died: Unknown
- College: Yale University

Singles

Grand Slam singles results
- US Open: QF (1896)

Doubles

Grand Slam doubles results
- US Open: W (1897, 1898)

George Preston Sheldon, Jr., born November 19, 1876, was an American tennis player who as active at the end of the 19th century. He won two men's doubles titles at the U.S. National Championships tennis at the Newport Casino together with Leo Ware.

In 1897 he reached the semifinals of the Western Championships and Canadian Championships. He played intercollegiate tennis and ice hockey for Yale.

== Grand Slam finals ==
=== Doubles (2 titles, 1 runner-up) ===
| Result | Year | Championship | Surface | Partner | Opponents | Score |
|---|---|---|---|---|---|---|
| Win | 1897 | U.S. Championships | Grass | (United States) Leo Ware | (United Kingdom of Great Britain and Ireland) Harold Mahony (United Kingdom of Great Britain and Ireland) Harold Nisbet | 11–13, 6–2, 9–7, 1–6, 6–1 |
| Win | 1898 | U.S. Championships | Grass | (United States) Leo Ware | (United States) Holcombe Ward (United States) Dwight Davis | 1–6, 7–5, 6–4, 4–6, 7–5 |
| Loss | 1899 | U.S. Championships | Grass | (United States) Leo Ware | (United States) Holcombe Ward (United States) Dwight F. Davis | 4–6, 4–6, 3–6 |

== Sources ==
- Birthdate sourced from Brian Pendleton And His Descendants, 1599–1910, compiled by Everett Hall Pendleton, 1911.
