= Holcombe Ward =

American tennis player

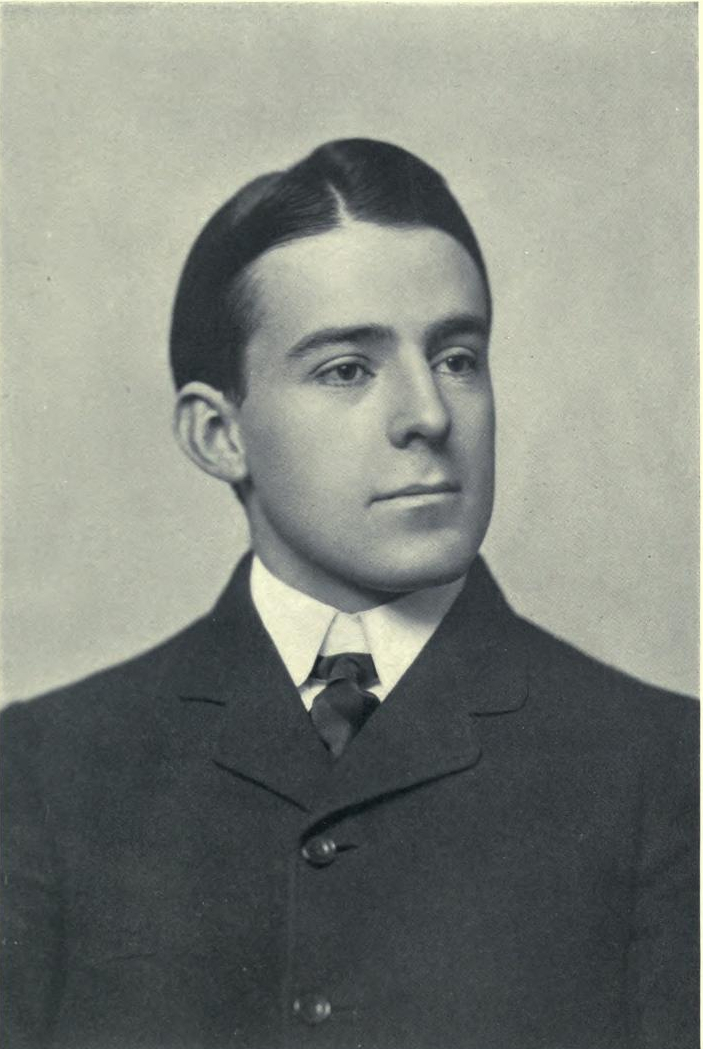
- Country (sports): United States
- Born: November 23, 1878; New York, NY, United States
- Died: January 23, 1967 (aged 88); Red Bank, NJ, United States
- Turned pro: 1895 (amateur tour)
- Retired: 1905 (brief comeback in 1917)
- Plays: Right-handed (one-handed backhand)
- Int. Tennis HoF: 1956 (member page)

Singles
- Highest ranking: No. 1 (1904, ITHF)

Grand Slam singles results
- Wimbledon: 1R (1905)
- US Open: W (1904)

Doubles

Grand Slam doubles results
- Wimbledon: F (1901)
- US Open: W (1899, 1900, 1901, 1904, 1905, 1906)

Holcombe Ward (November 23, 1878 – January 23, 1967) was an American tennis player who was active during the last years of the 19th century and the first decade of the 20th. He won the U.S. National Championships singles title in 1904 and additionally won six doubles titles at the Grand Slam event.

== Biography ==
Ward is best remembered for winning the men's singles title at the U.S. National Championships in 1904 after defeating William Clothier in straight sets in the all-comer's final. He graduated from Harvard University.

In 1905 Ward won the London Grass Court Championships, now known as Queen's Club Championships, after a walkover in the final against compatriot Beals Wright.

Ward was a member of the USA Davis Cup Team in 1900, 1902, 1905 and 1906. In 1900 and 1902 he played the doubles match in the challenge round which the US team won against the British Isles. In total, Ward played 14 Davis Cup matches in seven ties and compiled a 7–7 win–loss record.

After his active career, Ward became President of the USLTA (U.S. Lawn Tennis Association) from 1937 to 1947.

== Grand Slam finals ==
=== Singles: 2 (1 title, 1 runner-up) ===
| Result | Year | Championship | Surface | Opponent | Score |
|---|---|---|---|---|---|
| Win | 1904 | U.S. National Championships | Grass | (United States) William Clothier | 10–8, 6–4, 9–7 |
| Loss | 1905 | U.S. National Championships | Grass | (United States) Beals Wright | 2–6, 1–6, 9–11 |

=== Doubles: 9 (6 titles, 3 runners-up) ===
| Result | Year | Championship | Surface | Partner | Opponents | Score |
|---|---|---|---|---|---|---|
| Loss | 1898 | U.S. National Championships | Grass | (United States) Dwight F. Davis | (United States) George Sheldon (United States) Leo Ware | 6–1, 5–7, 4–6, 6–4, 5–7 |
| Win | 1899 | U.S. National Championships | Grass | (United States) Dwight F. Davis | (United States) George Sheldon (United States) Leo Ware | 6–4, 6–4, 6–3 |
| Win | 1900 | U.S. National Championships | Grass | (United States) Dwight F. Davis | (United States) Fred Alexander (United States) Raymond Little | 6–4, 9–7, 12–10 |
| Loss | 1901 | Wimbledon | Grass | (United States) Dwight F. Davis | (United Kingdom of Great Britain and Ireland) Laurence Doherty (United Kingdom of Great Britain and Ireland) Reginald Doherty | 6–4, 2–6, 3–6, 7–9 |
| Win | 1901 | U.S. National Championships | Grass | (United States) Dwight F. Davis | (United States) Leo Ware (United States) Beals Wright | 6–3, 9–7, 6–1 |
| Loss | 1902 | U.S. National Championships | Grass | (United States) Dwight F. Davis | (United Kingdom of Great Britain and Ireland) Laurence Doherty (United Kingdom of Great Britain and Ireland) Reginald Doherty | 9–11, 10–12, 4–6 |
| Win | 1904 | U.S. National Championships | Grass | (United States) Beals Wright | (United States) Kreigh Collins (United States) Raymond Little | 1–6, 6–2, 3–6, 6–4, 6–1 |
| Win | 1905 | U.S. National Championships | Grass | (United States) Beals Wright | (United States) Fred Alexander (United States) Harold Hackett | 6–4, 6–4, 6–1 |
| Win | 1906 | U.S. National Championships | Grass | (United States) Beals Wright | (United States) Fred Alexander (United States) Harold Hackett | 6–3, 3–6, 6–3, 6–3 |
