= 1893 Wimbledon Championships – Men's doubles =

Men's doubles
- 1893 Wimbledon Championships

Final
- Champions: (United Kingdom) Joshua Pim (United Kingdom) Frank Stoker
- Runners-up: (United Kingdom) Harry Barlow (United Kingdom) Ernest Lewis
- Score: 4–6, 6–3, 6–1, 2–6, 6–0

Details
- Draw: 10
- Seeds: –

Events
Singles	men	women
Doubles	men	women
← 1892 ·	Wimbledon Championships	· 1894 →

Joshua Pim and Frank Stoker defeated Herbert Baddeley and Wilfred Baddeley 6–2, 4–6, 6–3, 5–7, 6–2 in the All Comers' Final, and then defeated the reigning champions Harry Barlow and Ernest Lewis 4–6, 6–3, 6–1, 2–6, 6–0 in the challenge round to win the gentlemen's doubles tennis title at the 1893 Wimbledon Championships.

== Draw ==
=== Key ===
- Q = Qualifier
- WC = Wild card
- LL = Lucky loser
- Alt = Alternate
- SE = Special exempt
- PR = Protected ranking
- ITF = ITF entry
- JE = Junior exempt
- w/o = Walkover
- r = Retired
- d = Defaulted
- SR = Special ranking

=== Challenge round ===
Challenge Round
(United Kingdom) Joshua Pim (United Kingdom) Frank Stoker	4	6	6	2	6
(United Kingdom) Harry Barlow (United Kingdom) Ernest Lewis	6	3	1	6	0

=== All Comers' ===
First round
(United Kingdom) Joshua Pim (United Kingdom) Frank Stoker	6	10	6	9
(United Kingdom) Harold Mahony (United Kingdom) William Renshaw	4	12	0	7
(United Kingdom) Manliffe Goodbody (United Kingdom) Harry Scrivener	7	4	6	7
(United Kingdom) John Hickson (United Kingdom) E Swift	5	6	3	5

Quarterfinals
(United Kingdom) Arthur Gore (United Kingdom) Archdale Palmer	8	6	2	6
(United Kingdom) Harry Grove (United Kingdom) George Hillyard	6	2	6	4
(United Kingdom) CH Martin (United Kingdom) JF Martin	7	6	3	3
(United Kingdom) Joshua Pim (United Kingdom) Frank Stoker	9	4	6	6
(United Kingdom) Manliffe Goodbody (United Kingdom) Harry Scrivener	6	6	6
(United Kingdom) William Taylor (United Kingdom) A Walker	3	4	3
(United Kingdom) Herbert Baddeley (United Kingdom) Wilfred Baddeley	6	6	6
(United Kingdom) Wilberforce Eaves (United Kingdom) Ernest Meers	4	2	1

Semifinals
(United Kingdom) Arthur Gore (United Kingdom) Archdale Palmer	2	7	1	4
(United Kingdom) Joshua Pim (United Kingdom) Frank Stoker	6	5	6	6
(United Kingdom) Manliffe Goodbody (United Kingdom) Harry Scrivener	1	4	3
(United Kingdom) Herbert Baddeley (United Kingdom) Wilfred Baddeley	6	6	6

Final
(United Kingdom) Joshua Pim (United Kingdom) Frank Stoker	6	4	6	5	6
(United Kingdom) Herbert Baddeley (United Kingdom) Wilfred Baddeley	2	6	3	7	2
