= 1894 Wimbledon Championships – Men's doubles =

Men's doubles
- 1894 Wimbledon Championships

Final
- Champions: (United Kingdom) Herbert Baddeley (United Kingdom) Wilfred Baddeley
- Runners-up: (United Kingdom) Harry Barlow (United Kingdom) C. H. Martin
- Score: 5–7, 7–5, 4–6, 6–3, 8–6

Details
- Draw: 11
- Seeds: –

Events
Singles	men	women
Doubles	men	women
← 1893 ·	Wimbledon Championships	· 1895 →

Herbert Baddeley and Wilfred Baddeley defeated Harry Barlow and C. H. Martin 5–7, 7–5, 4–6, 6–3, 8–6 in the all comers' final to win the gentlemen's doubles tennis title at the 1894 Wimbledon Championships. The reigning champions Joshua Pim and Frank Stoker did not defend their title.

== Draw ==
=== Key ===
- Q = Qualifier
- WC = Wild card
- LL = Lucky loser
- Alt = Alternate
- SE = Special exempt
- PR = Protected ranking
- ITF = ITF entry
- JE = Junior exempt
- w/o = Walkover
- r = Retired
- d = Defaulted
- SR = Special ranking

=== All Comers' ===
First round
(United Kingdom) Herbert Baddeley (United Kingdom) Wilfred Baddeley
(United Kingdom) Ernest Renshaw (United Kingdom) William Taylor	w/o
(United Kingdom) George Mewburn (United Kingdom) E Swift	7	6	6
(United Kingdom) Charles Simond (United Kingdom) George Simond	5	3	0
(United Kingdom) George Ball-Greene (United Kingdom) Tom Chaytor	3	3	7	6	7
(United Kingdom) Harold Mahony (United Kingdom) Ernest Meers	6	6	5	2	5

Quarterfinals
(United Kingdom) Clement Cazalet (United Kingdom) George Hillyard	6	6	7
(United Kingdom) Arthur Gore (United Kingdom) Archdale Palmer	2	4	5
(United Kingdom) Herbert Baddeley (United Kingdom) Wilfred Baddeley	6	6	7
(United Kingdom) George Mewburn (United Kingdom) E Swift	4	2	5
(United Kingdom) George Ball-Greene (United Kingdom) Tom Chaytor	5	6	5	8
(United Kingdom) Harry Barlow (United Kingdom) C. H. Martin	7	4	7	10
(United Kingdom) COS Hatton (United Kingdom) Leslie Hausburg	6	12	6
(United Kingdom) R Hamblin-Smith (United Kingdom) RB Scott	2	10	3

Semifinals
(United Kingdom) Clement Cazalet (United Kingdom) George Hillyard	4	2	4
(United Kingdom) Herbert Baddeley (United Kingdom) Wilfred Baddeley	6	6	6
(United Kingdom) Harry Barlow (United Kingdom) C. H. Martin	6	5	12	3	6
(United Kingdom) COS Hatton (United Kingdom) Leslie Hausburg	0	7	10	6	4

Final
(United Kingdom) Herbert Baddeley (United Kingdom) Wilfred Baddeley	5	7	4	6	8
(United Kingdom) Harry Barlow (United Kingdom) CH Martin	7	5	6	3	6
