= 1893 Wimbledon Championships – Men's singles =

Men's singles
- 1893 Wimbledon Championships

Final
- Champion: (United Kingdom) Joshua Pim
- Runner-up: (United Kingdom) Wilfred Baddeley
- Score: 3–6, 6–1, 6–3, 6–2

Details
- Draw: 27
- Seeds: –

Events
Singles	men	women
Doubles	men	women
← 1892 ·	Wimbledon Championships	· 1894 →

Joshua Pim defeated Harold Mahony 9–7, 6–3, 6–0 in the All Comers' Final, and then defeated the reigning champion Wilfred Baddeley 3–6, 6–1, 6–3, 6–2 in the challenge round to win the gentlemen's singles tennis title at the 1893 Wimbledon Championships.

== Draw ==
=== Key ===
- Q = Qualifier
- WC = Wild card
- LL = Lucky loser
- Alt = Alternate
- SE = Special exempt
- PR = Protected ranking
- ITF = ITF entry
- JE = Junior exempt
- w/o = Walkover
- r = Retired
- d = Defaulted
- SR = Special ranking

=== Challenge round ===
Challenge Round
(United Kingdom) Joshua Pim	3	6	6	6
(United Kingdom) Wilfred Baddeley	6	1	3	2

=== All comers' finals ===
Semifinals
(United Kingdom) Harry Barlow	7	2	3
(United Kingdom) Joshua Pim	9	6	6
(United Kingdom) Harold Mahony	3	6	6	6
(United Kingdom) Archdale Palmer	6	3	3	1

Final
(United Kingdom) Joshua Pim	9	6	6
(United Kingdom) Harold Mahony	7	3	0

=== Top half ===
First round
(United Kingdom) Harry Barlow	6	3	5	6	6
(United Kingdom) Ernest Meers	2	6	7	4	3
(United Kingdom) Arthur Gore	6	6	6
(United Kingdom) SH Hughes	4	2	2
(United Kingdom) Horace Chapman	3	1	0
(United Kingdom) Manliffe Goodbody	6	6	6
(United Kingdom) George Hillyard	6	7	6
(United Kingdom) James Crispe	2	5	2
(United Kingdom) Alfred Crawley	4	6	3	2
(United Kingdom) Joshua Pim	6	2	6	6
(United Kingdom) Sydney Smith	1	6	6	6
(United Kingdom) HJW Fosbery	6	1	2	4

Second round
(United Kingdom) Arthur Hallward	6	6	6
(United Kingdom) H Bacon	4	4	4
(United Kingdom) H Barlow	6	3	2	6	6
(United Kingdom) A Gore	4	6	6	2	2
(United Kingdom) M Goodbody	4	6	6	8	6
(United Kingdom) G Hillyard	6	3	8	6	2
(United Kingdom) J Pim	6	7	7
(United Kingdom) S Smith	2	5	5

Quarterfinals
(United Kingdom) A Hallward	9	2	8	8	1
(United Kingdom) H Barlow	7	6	10	6	6
(United Kingdom) M Goodbody	6	3	6	1
(United Kingdom) J Pim	8	6	3	6

Semifinals
(United Kingdom) H Barlow	7	2	3
(United Kingdom) J Pim	9	6	6

=== Bottom half ===
First round
(United Kingdom) William Cranston	6	3	1	4
(United Kingdom) Harold Mahony	4	6	6	6
(United Kingdom) Ernest Renshaw
(United Kingdom) William Renshaw	w/o
(United Kingdom) Frank Stoker	8	7	4	6
(United Kingdom) Herbert Baddeley	6	5	6	2
(United Kingdom) Wilberforce Eaves	6	6	6
(United Kingdom) W Escombe	1	2	2
(United Kingdom) Harry Grove	4	2	6
(United Kingdom) Neville Durlacher	6	6	8

Second round
(United Kingdom) H Mahony	1	7	6	4	6
(United Kingdom) E Renshaw	6	5	1	6	3
(United Kingdom) F Stoker	5	1	6	9
(United Kingdom) W Eaves	7	6	1	11
(United Kingdom) N Durlacher	6	6	6
(United Kingdom) D Fuller	1	3	3
(United Kingdom) Archdale Palmer	6	6	10	6
(United Kingdom) Thomas Haydon	1	3	12	3

Quarterfinals
(United Kingdom) H Mahony	10	11	6
(United Kingdom) W Eaves	8	9	0
(United Kingdom) N Durlacher	3	4	5
(United Kingdom) A Palmer	6	6	7

Semifinals
(United Kingdom) H Mahony	3	6	6	6
(United Kingdom) A Palmer	6	3	3	1

Preceded by 1892 U.S. National Championships – Men's singles	Grand Slam men's singles	Succeeded by 1894 U.S. National Championships – Men's singles
