= 1894 Wimbledon Championships – Men's singles =

Men's singles
- 1894 Wimbledon Championships

Final
- Champion: (United Kingdom) Joshua Pim
- Runner-up: (United Kingdom) Wilfred Baddeley
- Score: 10–8, 6–2, 8–6

Details
- Draw: 23
- Seeds: –

Events
Singles	men	women
Doubles	men	women
← 1893 ·	Wimbledon Championships	· 1895 →

Wilfred Baddeley defeated Ernest Lewis 6–0, 6–1, 6–0 in the All Comers' Final, but the reigning champion Joshua Pim defeated Baddeley 10–8, 6–2, 8–6 in the challenge round to win the gentlemen's singles tennis title at the 1894 Wimbledon Championships.

== Draw ==
=== Key ===
- Q = Qualifier
- WC = Wild card
- LL = Lucky loser
- Alt = Alternate
- SE = Special exempt
- PR = Protected ranking
- ITF = ITF entry
- JE = Junior exempt
- w/o = Walkover
- r = Retired
- d = Defaulted
- SR = Special ranking

=== Challenge round ===
Challenge Round
(United Kingdom) Wilfred Baddeley	8	2	6
(United Kingdom) Joshua Pim	10	6	8

=== All comers' finals ===
Semifinals
(United Kingdom) Wilfred Baddeley
(United Kingdom) Tom Chaytor	w/o
(United Kingdom) Ernest Lewis	2	7	6	1	7
(United Kingdom) Herbert Baddeley	6	5	3	6	5

Final
(United Kingdom) Wilfred Baddeley	6	6	6
(United Kingdom) Ernest Lewis	0	1	0

=== Top half ===
First round
(United Kingdom) Tom Chaytor	8	6	6
(United Kingdom) Horace Chapman	6	1	0
(United Kingdom) Reginald Doherty	3	4	6	3
(United Kingdom) Clement Cazalet	6	6	2	6
(United Kingdom) Ernest Meers	6	6	6
(United Kingdom) Arthur Hallward	3	2	3
(United Kingdom) George Ball-Greene
(United Kingdom) Wilberforce Eaves	w/o

Second round
(United States) JF Talmage
(United Kingdom) James Crispe	w/o
(United Kingdom) Wilfred Baddeley	6	6	6
(United Kingdom) D Fuller	3	2	0
(United Kingdom) T Chaytor	6	2	6	6
(United Kingdom) C Cazalet	4	6	1	4
(United Kingdom) E Meers	6	6	6
(United Kingdom) G Ball-Greene	3	0	2

Quarterfinals
(United States) JF Talmage	2	1	3
(United Kingdom) W Baddeley	6	6	6
(United Kingdom) T Chaytor	1	6	6	8	6
(United Kingdom) E Meers	6	1	8	6	4

Semifinals
(United Kingdom) W Baddeley
(United Kingdom) T Chaytor	w/o

=== Bottom half ===
First round
(United Kingdom) Harold Mahony	6	4	7	6
(United Kingdom) William Cranston	3	6	5	1
(United Kingdom) Ernest Lewis	6	4	6	6
(United Kingdom) Arthur Gore	2	6	2	4
(United Kingdom) George Simond	6	6	6
(United Kingdom) Harold Nisbet	4	3	3

Second round
(United Kingdom) H Mahony	1	1	3
(United Kingdom) E Lewis	6	6	6
(United Kingdom) G Simond
(United Kingdom) Manliffe Goodbody	w/o
(United Kingdom) RB Scott	11	4	2	4
(United Kingdom) Harry Barlow	9	6	6	6
(United Kingdom) Archdale Palmer	3	1	3
(United Kingdom) Herbert Baddeley	6	6	6

Quarterfinals
(United Kingdom) E Lewis	6	6	6
(United Kingdom) G Simond	2	3	2
(United Kingdom) H Barlow	6	3	6	1	1
(United Kingdom) H Baddeley	0	6	4	6	6

Semifinals
(United Kingdom) E Lewis	2	7	6	1	7
(United Kingdom) H Baddeley	6	5	3	6	5

Preceded by 1893 U.S. National Championships – Men's singles	Grand Slam men's singles	Succeeded by 1895 U.S. National Championships – Men's singles
