= 1890 Wimbledon Championships – Men's doubles =

Men's doubles
- 1890 Wimbledon Championships

Final
- Champions: (United Kingdom) Joshua Pim (United Kingdom) Frank Stoker
- Runners-up: (United Kingdom) George Hillyard (United Kingdom) Ernest Lewis
- Score: 6–0, 7–5, 6–4

Details
- Draw: 7
- Seeds: –

Events
Singles	men	women
Doubles	men	women
← 1889 ·	Wimbledon Championships	· 1891 →

Joshua Pim and Frank Stoker defeated George Hillyard and Ernest Lewis 6–0, 7–5, 6–4 in the all comers' final to win the gentlemen's doubles tennis title at the 1890 Wimbledon Championships. The reigning champions Ernest Renshaw and William Renshaw did not defend their title.

== Draw ==
=== Key ===
- Q = Qualifier
- WC = Wild card
- LL = Lucky loser
- Alt = Alternate
- SE = Special exempt
- PR = Protected ranking
- ITF = ITF entry
- JE = Junior exempt
- w/o = Walkover
- r = Retired
- d = Defaulted
- SR = Special ranking

=== All Comers' ===
Quarterfinals
(United Kingdom) George Hillyard (United Kingdom) Ernest Lewis	6	6	6
(United Kingdom) Harry Barlow (United Kingdom) Harold Mahony	1	0	4
(United Kingdom) GED Brown (United Kingdom) P Brown
(United Kingdom) James Baldwin (United Kingdom) W Bush-Salmon	w/o
(United Kingdom) Herbert Baddeley (United Kingdom) Wilfred Baddeley	6	4	6	6
(United Kingdom) Arthur Stanley (United Kingdom) Herbert Wilberforce	4	6	1	2

Semifinals
(United Kingdom) George Hillyard (United Kingdom) Ernest Lewis	6	6	8
(United Kingdom) GED Brown (United Kingdom) P Brown	2	4	6
(United Kingdom) Herbert Baddeley (United Kingdom) Wilfred Baddeley	1	5	7	1
(United Kingdom) Joshua Pim (United Kingdom) Frank Stoker	6	7	5	6

Final
(United Kingdom) George Hillyard (United Kingdom) Ernest Lewis	0	5	4
(United Kingdom) Joshua Pim (United Kingdom) Frank Stoker	6	7	6
