= 1895 Wimbledon Championships – Men's singles =

Men's singles
- 1895 Wimbledon Championships

Final
- Champion: (United Kingdom) Wilfred Baddeley
- Runner-up: (United Kingdom) Wilberforce Eaves
- Score: 4–6, 2–6, 8–6, 6–2, 6–3

Details
- Draw: 18
- Seeds: –

Events
Singles	men	women
Doubles	men	women
← 1894 ·	Wimbledon Championships	· 1896 →

Wilfred Baddeley defeated Wilberforce Eaves 4–6, 2–6, 8–6, 6–2, 6–3 in the all comers' final to win the gentlemen's singles tennis title at the 1895 Wimbledon Championships. The reigning champion Joshua Pim did not defend his title.

== Draw ==
=== Key ===
- Q = Qualifier
- WC = Wild card
- LL = Lucky loser
- Alt = Alternate
- SE = Special exempt
- PR = Protected ranking
- ITF = ITF entry
- JE = Junior exempt
- w/o = Walkover
- r = Retired
- d = Defaulted
- SR = Special ranking

=== All comers' finals ===
Semifinals
(United Kingdom) Wilfred Baddeley
(United Kingdom) Herbert Baddeley	w/o
(United Kingdom) Ernest Meers	3	9	11	4	1
(United Kingdom) Wilberforce Eaves	6	7	9	6	6

Final
(United Kingdom) Wilfred Baddeley	4	2	8	6	6
(United Kingdom) Wilberforce Eaves	6	6	6	2	3

=== Top half ===
First round
(United Kingdom) Harold Nisbet	6	6	3
(United Kingdom) Ernest Lewis	2	3	0^{r}

Second round
(United Kingdom) Wilfred Baddeley
(United Kingdom) Arthur Gore	w/o
(United Kingdom) Harry Barlow	5	6	6	6
(United Kingdom) Clement Cazalet	7	4	4	2
(United Kingdom) Herbert Baddeley	6	6	6
(United Kingdom) Horace Chapman	4	3	0
(United Kingdom) Reginald Doherty	4	6	6	6
(United Kingdom) H Nisbet	6	4	4	4

Quarterfinals
(United Kingdom) W Baddeley	6	6	8
(United Kingdom) H Barlow	1	4	6
(United Kingdom) H Baddeley	6	6	6
(United Kingdom) R Doherty	4	2	4

Semifinals
(United Kingdom) W Baddeley
(United Kingdom) H Baddeley	w/o

=== Bottom half ===
First round
(United Kingdom) Ernest Meers
(United Kingdom) Manliffe Goodbody	w/o

Second round
(United Kingdom) E Meers	7	6	6
(United Kingdom) Arthur Hallward	5	3	1
(United Kingdom) John Flavelle
(United Kingdom) Arthur Meers	w/o
(United Kingdom) Edward Avory	w/o
(United Kingdom) George Simond
(United Kingdom) William Taylor	w/o
(United Kingdom) Wilberforce Eaves

Quarterfinals
(United Kingdom) E Meers	6	6	6
(United Kingdom) J Flavelle	1	2	1
(United Kingdom) G Simond	4	2	5
(United Kingdom) W Eaves	6	6	7

Semifinals
(United Kingdom) E Meers	3	9	11	4	1
(United Kingdom) W Eaves	6	7	9	6	6

Preceded by 1894 U.S. National Championships – Men's singles	Grand Slam men's singles	Succeeded by 1896 U.S. National Championships – Men's singles
