= 1895 Wimbledon Championships – Men's doubles =

Men's doubles
- 1895 Wimbledon Championships

Final
- Champions: (United Kingdom) Herbert Baddeley (United Kingdom) Wilfred Baddeley
- Runners-up: (United Kingdom) Wilberforce Eaves (United Kingdom) Ernest Lewis
- Score: 8–6, 5–7, 6–4, 6–3

Details
- Draw: 6
- Seeds: –

Events
Singles	men	women
Doubles	men	women
← 1894 ·	Wimbledon Championships	· 1896 →

Wilberforce Eaves and Ernest Lewis defeated Walter Bailey and Charles Simond 6–4, 6–4, 6–3 in the All Comers' Final, but the reigning champions Herbert Baddeley and Wilfred Baddeley defeated Eaves and Lewis 8–6, 5–7, 6–4, 6–3 in the challenge round to win the gentlemen's doubles tennis title at the 1895 Wimbledon Championships.

== Draw ==
=== Key ===
- Q = Qualifier
- WC = Wild card
- LL = Lucky loser
- Alt = Alternate
- SE = Special exempt
- PR = Protected ranking
- ITF = ITF entry
- JE = Junior exempt
- w/o = Walkover
- r = Retired
- d = Defaulted
- SR = Special ranking

=== Challenge round ===
Challenge Round
(United Kingdom) Wilberforce Eaves (United Kingdom) Ernest Lewis	6	7	4	3
(United Kingdom) Herbert Baddeley (United Kingdom) Wilfred Baddeley	8	5	6	6

=== All Comers' ===
Quarterfinals						Semifinals						Final
						(United Kingdom) Harry Barlow (United Kingdom) CH Martin	7	6	0	4	4
(United Kingdom) Wilberforce Eaves (United Kingdom) Ernest Lewis	6	6	7			(United Kingdom) Wilberforce Eaves (United Kingdom) Ernest Lewis	5	4	6	6	6
(United Kingdom) SM Jones (United Kingdom) Arthur Kirby	4	3	5									(United Kingdom) Wilberforce Eaves (United Kingdom) Ernest Lewis	6	6	6
(United Kingdom) Walter Bailey (United Kingdom) Charles Simond	6	6	2	2	6							(United Kingdom) Walter Bailey (United Kingdom) Charles Simond	4	4	3
(United Kingdom) Laurence Doherty (United Kingdom) Reginald Doherty	3	3	6	6	3	(United Kingdom) Walter Bailey (United Kingdom) Charles Simond
						(United Kingdom) Clement Cazalet (United Kingdom) George Mewburn	w/o
