= 1889 Wimbledon Championships – Men's doubles =

Men's doubles
- 1889 Wimbledon Championships

Final
- Champions: (United Kingdom) Ernest Renshaw (United Kingdom) William Renshaw
- Runners-up: (United Kingdom) George Hillyard (United Kingdom) Ernest Lewis
- Score: 6–4, 6–4, 3–6, 0–6, 6–1

Details
- Draw: 9
- Seeds: –

Events
Singles	men	women
Doubles	men	women
← 1888 ·	Wimbledon Championships	· 1890 →

George Hillyard and Ernest Lewis defeated Arthur Gore and George Mewburn 6–2, 6–1, 6–3 in the All Comers' Final, but the reigning champions Ernest Renshaw and William Renshaw defeated Hillyard and Lewis 6–4, 6–4, 3–6, 0–6, 6–1 in the challenge round to win the gentlemen's doubles tennis title at the 1889 Wimbledon Championships.

== Draw ==
=== Key ===
- Q = Qualifier
- WC = Wild card
- LL = Lucky loser
- Alt = Alternate
- SE = Special exempt
- PR = Protected ranking
- ITF = ITF entry
- JE = Junior exempt
- w/o = Walkover
- r = Retired
- d = Defaulted
- SR = Special ranking

=== Challenge round ===
Challenge Round
(United Kingdom) George Hillyard (United Kingdom) Ernest Lewis	4	4	6	6	1
(United Kingdom) Ernest Renshaw (United Kingdom) William Renshaw	6	6	3	0	6

=== All Comers' ===
First round
(United Kingdom) CJ Cramer-Roberts (United Kingdom) HC Smith
(United Kingdom) FL Rawson (United Kingdom) HS Stone	w/o

Quarterfinals
(United Kingdom) RK Micklethwait (United Kingdom) W Watkins
(United Kingdom) Harry Carlton (United Kingdom) Harry Scrivener	w/o
(United Kingdom) Arthur Gore (United Kingdom) George Mewburn	6	6	6
(United Kingdom) CJ Cramer-Roberts (United Kingdom) HC Smith	2	2	3
(United Kingdom) George Hillyard (United Kingdom) Ernest Lewis	6	4	6	6
(United Kingdom) GED Brown (United Kingdom) P Brown	3	6	4	0
(United Kingdom) Herbert Baddeley (United Kingdom) Wilfred Baddeley	6	6	6
(United Kingdom) Arthur Stanley (United Kingdom) A Walker	4	3	2

Semifinals
(United Kingdom) RK Micklethwait (United Kingdom) W Watkins	w/o
(United Kingdom) Arthur Gore (United Kingdom) George Mewburn
(United Kingdom) George Hillyard (United Kingdom) Ernest Lewis	9	6	3	4	6
(United Kingdom) Herbert Baddeley (United Kingdom) Wilfred Baddeley	7	3	6	6	1

Final
(United Kingdom) Arthur Gore (United Kingdom) George Mewburn	2	1	3
(United Kingdom) George Hillyard (United Kingdom) Ernest Lewis	6	6	6
