= 1891 Wimbledon Championships – Men's doubles =

Men's doubles
- 1891 Wimbledon Championships

Final
- Champions: (United Kingdom) Herbert Baddeley (United Kingdom) Wilfred Baddeley
- Runners-up: (United Kingdom) Joshua Pim (United Kingdom) Frank Stoker
- Score: 6–1, 6–3, 1–6, 6–2

Details
- Draw: 4
- Seeds: –

Events
Singles	men	women
Doubles	men	women
← 1890 ·	Wimbledon Championships	· 1892 →

Herbert Baddeley and Wilfred Baddeley defeated Harry Barlow and Ernest Renshaw 4–6, 6–4, 7–5, 0–6, 6–2 in the All Comers' Final, and then defeated the reigning champions Joshua Pim and Frank Stoker 6–1, 6–3, 1–6, 6–2 in the challenge round to win the gentlemen's doubles tennis title at the 1891 Wimbledon Championships.

== Draw ==
=== Key ===
- Q = Qualifier
- WC = Wild card
- LL = Lucky loser
- Alt = Alternate
- SE = Special exempt
- PR = Protected ranking
- ITF = ITF entry
- JE = Junior exempt
- w/o = Walkover
- r = Retired
- d = Defaulted
- SR = Special ranking

=== Challenge round ===
Challenge Round
(United Kingdom) Herbert Baddeley (United Kingdom) Wilfred Baddeley	6	6	1	6
(United Kingdom) Joshua Pim (United Kingdom) Frank Stoker	1	3	6	2

=== All Comers' ===
Semifinals
(United Kingdom) Herbert Baddeley (United Kingdom) Wilfred Baddeley	13	4	8	7
(United Kingdom) Harold Mahony (United Kingdom) George Mewburn	11	6	6	5
(United Kingdom) Harry Barlow (United Kingdom) Ernest Renshaw	7	6	7	6
(United Kingdom) Wilfred Milne (United Kingdom) Arthur Stanley	5	1	9	0

Final
(United Kingdom) Herbert Baddeley (United Kingdom) Wilfred Baddeley	4	6	7	0	6
(United Kingdom) Harry Barlow (United Kingdom) Ernest Renshaw	6	4	5	6	2
