= 1892 Wimbledon Championships – Men's doubles =

Men's doubles
- 1892 Wimbledon Championships

Final
- Champions: (United Kingdom) Harry Barlow (United Kingdom) Ernest Lewis
- Runners-up: (United Kingdom) Herbert Baddeley (United Kingdom) Wilfred Baddeley
- Score: 4–6, 6–2, 8–6, 6–4

Details
- Draw: 5
- Seeds: –

Events
Singles	men	women
Doubles	men	women
← 1891 ·	Wimbledon Championships	· 1893 →

Harry Barlow and Ernest Lewis defeated Harold Mahony and Joshua Pim 8–10, 6–3, 5–7, 11–9, 6–1 in the All Comers' Final, and then defeated the reigning champions Herbert Baddeley and Wilfred Baddeley 4–6, 6–2, 8–6, 6–4 in the challenge round to win the gentlemen's doubles tennis title at the 1892 Wimbledon Championships.

== Draw ==
=== Key ===
- Q = Qualifier
- WC = Wild card
- LL = Lucky loser
- Alt = Alternate
- SE = Special exempt
- PR = Protected ranking
- ITF = ITF entry
- JE = Junior exempt
- w/o = Walkover
- r = Retired
- d = Defaulted
- SR = Special ranking

=== Challenge round ===
Challenge round
(United Kingdom) Harry Barlow (United Kingdom) Ernest Lewis	4	6	8	6
(United Kingdom) Herbert Baddeley (United Kingdom) Wilfred Baddeley	6	2	6	4

=== All Comers' ===
Quarterfinals				Semifinals				Final
				(United States) Oliver Campbell (United Kingdom) George Hillyard	2	4	2
(United Kingdom) Harry Barlow (United Kingdom) Ernest Lewis	6	6	6	(United Kingdom) Harry Barlow (United Kingdom) Ernest Lewis	6	6	6
(United Kingdom) Wilfred Milne (United Kingdom) TR Spyers	3	1	1					(United Kingdom) Harry Barlow (United Kingdom) Ernest Lewis	8	6	5	11	6
								(United Kingdom) Harold Mahony (United Kingdom) Joshua Pim	10	3	7	9	1
				(United Kingdom) Harold Mahony (United Kingdom) Joshua Pim
				(United Kingdom) Arthur Gore (United Kingdom) Archdale Palmer	w/o
