= 1896 Wimbledon Championships – Men's doubles =

Men's doubles
- 1896 Wimbledon Championships

Final
- Champions: (United Kingdom) Herbert Baddeley (United Kingdom) Wilfred Baddeley
- Runners-up: (United Kingdom) Reginald Doherty (United Kingdom) Harold Nisbet
- Score: 1–6, 3–6, 6–4, 6–2, 6–1

Details
- Draw: 14
- Seeds: –

Events
Singles	men	women
Doubles	men	women
- Wimbledon Championships

Reginald Doherty and Harold Nisbet defeated Charles Allen and Roy Allen 3–6, 7–5, 6–4, 6–1 in the All Comers' Final, but the reigning champions Herbert Baddeley and Wilfred Baddeley defeated Doherty and Nisbet 1–6, 3–6, 6–4, 6–2, 6–1 in the challenge round to win the gentlemen's doubles tennis title at the 1896 Wimbledon Championships.

== Draw ==
Key

- Q = Qualifier
- WC = Wild card
- LL = Lucky loser
- Alt = Alternate
- ITF = ITF entry
- PR = Protected ranking
- SR = Special ranking
- SE = Special exempt
- JE = Junior exempt
- JR = Junior Accelerator Programme entrant
- CO = College Accelerator Programme entrant
- NG = Next Gen Accelerator Program entrant
- w/o = Walkover
- r = Retired
- d = Defaulted

=== Challenge round ===
Challenge Round
(United Kingdom) Reginald Doherty (United Kingdom) Harold Nisbet	6	7	4	3
(United Kingdom) Herbert Baddeley (United Kingdom) Wilfred Baddeley	8	5	6	6

=== All Comers' ===
First round
(United Kingdom) Wilberforce Eaves (United Kingdom) Ernest Lewis	6	6	6
(United Kingdom) Patrick Bowes-Lyon (United Kingdom) Herbert Wilberforce	4	0	3
(United Kingdom) Clement Cazalet (United Kingdom) George Greville	6	6	6
(United Kingdom) Charles Dixon (United Kingdom) Frederick Plaskitt	0	0	0
(United Kingdom) Reginald Doherty (United Kingdom) Harold Nisbet	6	6	6
(United Kingdom) Walter Bailey (United Kingdom) Charles Simond	4	2	3
(United Kingdom) Arthur Riseley (United Kingdom) Frank Riseley	4	4	6	6	6
(United States) William Larned (United Kingdom) Harold Mahony	6	6	4	4	4
(United Kingdom) Charles Allen (United Kingdom) Roy Allen
(United Kingdom) CH Martin (United Kingdom) George Simond	w/o
(United Kingdom) Laurence Doherty (United Kingdom) RB Scott	6	6	6
(United Kingdom) H Marley (United Kingdom) George Mewburn	4	4	0

Quarterfinals
(United Kingdom) W Castle (United Kingdom) Arthur Gore	2	1	3
(United Kingdom) Wilberforce Eaves (United Kingdom) Ernest Lewis	6	6	6
(United Kingdom) Clement Cazalet (United Kingdom) George Greville	1	3	1
(United Kingdom) Reginald Doherty (United Kingdom) Harold Nisbet	6	6	6
(United Kingdom) Arthur Riseley (United Kingdom) Frank Riseley	2	2	7
(United Kingdom) Charles Allen (United Kingdom) Roy Allen	6	6	9
(United Kingdom) Laurence Doherty (United Kingdom) RB Scott	6	6	2	6
(United States) Arthur Foote (United Kingdom) Arthur Hallward	4	1	6	1

Semifinals
(United Kingdom) Wilberforce Eaves (United Kingdom) Ernest Lewis	6	8	6
(United Kingdom) Reginald Doherty (United Kingdom) Harold Nisbet	3	6	4
(United Kingdom) Charles Allen (United Kingdom) Roy Allen	3	6	6	6
(United Kingdom) Laurence Doherty (United Kingdom) RB Scott	6	1	1	2

Final
(United Kingdom) Reginald Doherty (United Kingdom) Harold Nisbet	3	7	6	6
(United Kingdom) Charles Allen (United Kingdom) Roy Allen	6	5	4	1
