= 1892 Wimbledon Championships =

- Date: 27 June – 7 July
- Edition: 16th
- Category: Grand Slam
- Surface: Grass
- Location: Worple Road; SW19, Wimbledon, London, United Kingdom
- Venue: All England Lawn Tennis Club

Champions

Men's singles
- (United Kingdom) Wilfred Baddeley

Women's singles
- (United Kingdom) Lottie Dod

Men's doubles
- (United Kingdom) Harry Barlow / (United Kingdom) Ernest Lewis
- Wimbledon Championships

The 1892 Wimbledon Championships took place on the outdoor grass courts at the All England Lawn Tennis Club in Wimbledon, London, United Kingdom. The tournament ran from 27 June until 7 July. It was the 16th staging of the Wimbledon Championships, and the first Grand Slam tennis event of 1892. From this year, all events (singles and doubles) were played concurrently.

== Champions ==
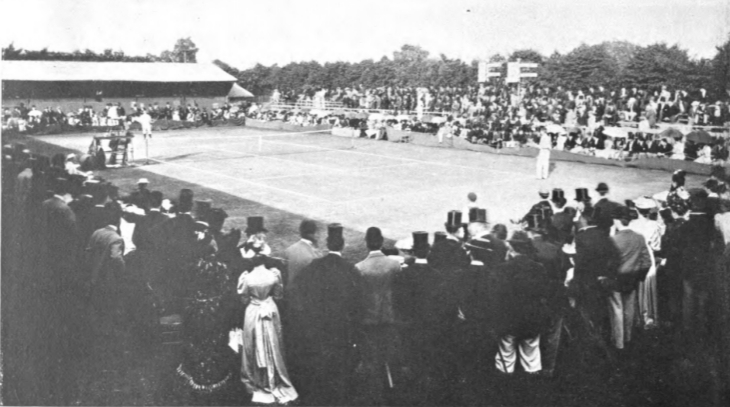
Wimbledon 1892, All-Comers final, Pim vs Lewis

=== Men's singles ===
(United Kingdom) Wilfred Baddeley defeated (United Kingdom) Joshua Pim, 4–6, 6–3, 6–3, 6–2

=== Women's singles ===
(United Kingdom) Lottie Dod defeated (United Kingdom) Blanche Hillyard, 6–1, 6–1

=== Men's doubles ===
(United Kingdom) Harry Barlow / (United Kingdom) Ernest Lewis defeated (United Kingdom) Herbert Baddeley / (United Kingdom) Wilfred Baddeley, 4–6, 6–2, 8–6, 6–4

Preceded by 1891 U.S. National Championships	Grand Slams	Succeeded by 1892 U.S. National Championships
