= 1895 Wimbledon Championships =

19th staging of the Wimbledon Championships

- Date: 8 – 15 July
- Edition: 19th
- Category: Grand Slam
- Surface: Grass
- Location: Worple Road; SW19, Wimbledon, London, United Kingdom
- Venue: All England Lawn Tennis Club

Champions

Men's singles
- (United Kingdom) Wilfred Baddeley

Women's singles
- (United Kingdom) Charlotte Cooper

Men's doubles
- (United Kingdom) Herbert Baddeley / (United Kingdom) Wilfred Baddeley
- Wimbledon Championships

The 1895 Wimbledon Championships took place on the outdoor grass courts at the All England Lawn Tennis Club in Wimbledon, London, United Kingdom. The tournament ran from 8 July until 15 July. It was the 19th staging of the Wimbledon Championships, and the first Grand Slam tennis event of 1895. There were 18 competitors for the men's singles title, 9 for the ladies' singles and 7 pairs entered the gentleman's doubles. The meeting recorded its only loss, of 33 pounds. The tournament saw the Wimbledon Championship's first royal visitors when the Crown Princess of Austria, Princess Stéphanie of Belgium and Prince Edmund Batthyany-Strattmann watched the Gentleman's Doubles Challenge Rounds on 15 July.

The entry fee was £1 and 1 shilling (equivalent to £114 in 2025) for the gentleman's singles with the same amount levied per gentleman's doubles pair. The entry fee for the ladies singles was 10 shillings (s) and 6 pence (d). Ground admission for the whole meeting was 7s 6d. Daily entry for the first three days cost a shilling; it was 2s and 6d thereafter. A reserved covered seat on Centre Court for the duration of the championship cost 7s 6d or a shilling per day.

== Finals ==
=== Men's singles ===
(United Kingdom) Wilfred Baddeley defeated (United Kingdom) Wilberforce Eaves 4–6, 2–6, 8–6, 6–2, 6–3

=== Women's singles ===
(United Kingdom) Charlotte Cooper defeated (United Kingdom) Helen Jackson 7–5, 8–6

=== Men's doubles ===
(United Kingdom) Herbert Baddeley / (United Kingdom) Wilfred Baddeley defeated (United Kingdom) Wilberforce Eaves / (United Kingdom) Ernest Lewis 8–6, 5–7, 6–4, 6–3

== Bibliography ==
- Little, Alan (2006). Wimbledon Compendium, 2006. All England Lawn Tennis and Croquet Club. ISBN 978-1-89903-925-8.

Preceded by 1894 U.S. National Championships	Grand Slams	Succeeded by 1895 U.S. National Championships
