= 1896 Wimbledon Championships – Men's singles =

Men's singles
- 1896 Wimbledon Championships

Final
- Champion: (United Kingdom) Harold Mahony
- Runner-up: (United Kingdom) Wilfred Baddeley
- Score: 6–2, 6–8, 5–7, 8–6, 6–3

Details
- Draw: 31
- Seeds: –

Events
Singles	men	women
Doubles	men	women
← 1895 ·	Wimbledon Championships	· 1897 →

Harold Mahony defeated Wilberforce Eaves 6–2, 6–2, 11–9 in the All Comers Final, and then defeated the reigning champion Wilfred Baddeley 6–2, 6–8, 5–7, 8–6, 6–3 in the challenge round to win the gentlemen's singles tennis title at the 1896 Wimbledon Championships.

== Draw ==
=== Key ===
- Q = Qualifier
- WC = Wild card
- LL = Lucky loser
- Alt = Alternate
- SE = Special exempt
- PR = Protected ranking
- ITF = ITF entry
- JE = Junior exempt
- w/o = Walkover
- r = Retired
- d = Defaulted
- SR = Special ranking

=== Challenge round ===
Challenge Round
(United Kingdom) Harold Mahony	6	6	5	8	6
(United Kingdom) Wilfred Baddeley	2	8	7	6	3

=== All comers' finals ===
Semifinals
(United Kingdom) Harold Mahony	6	2	8	4	6
(United Kingdom) Harold Nisbet	4	6	6	6	3
(United Kingdom) Wilberforce Eaves	6	6	6
(United Kingdom) Herbert Baddeley	4	3	4

Final
(United Kingdom) Harold Mahony	6	6	11
(United Kingdom) Wilberforce Eaves	2	2	9

=== Top half ===
First round
(United Kingdom) W Castle	6	6	3	6
(United Kingdom) Frederick Payn	2	1	6	2
(United Kingdom) Reginald Doherty	3	7	1	6	2
(United Kingdom) Harold Mahony	6	5	6	3	6
(United Kingdom) Frank Riseley	6	6	7
(United Kingdom) John Flavelle	2	1	5
(United Kingdom) Arthur Riseley	6	6	6	6
(United Kingdom) Frederick Plaskitt	2	8	1	1
(United Kingdom) Harold Nisbet	6	6	6
(United Kingdom) Walter Bailey	1	3	2
(United Kingdom) Charles Dixon	3	3	2
(United Kingdom) Horace Chapman	6	6	6
(United Kingdom) George Simond	6	3	2	7	6
(United Kingdom) George Greville	4	6	6	5	3
(United Kingdom) Charles Allen	3	6	6	1	6
(United Kingdom) RB Scott	6	0	4	6	4

Second round
(United Kingdom) W Castle	1	9	4
(United Kingdom) H Mahony	6	11	6
(United Kingdom) F Riseley	8
(United Kingdom) A Riseley	8^{r}
(United Kingdom) H Nisbet	3	3	6	6	6
(United Kingdom) H Chapman	6	6	1	3	4
(United Kingdom) G Simond	6	6	6
(United Kingdom) C Allen	1	2	1

Quarterfinals
(United Kingdom) H Mahony	7	5	7	6
(United Kingdom) F Riseley	5	7	5	3
(United Kingdom) H Nisbet	2	6	6	1	6
(United Kingdom) G Simond	6	4	4	6	3

Semifinals
(United Kingdom) H Mahony	6	2	8	4	6
(United Kingdom) H Nisbet	4	6	6	6	3

=== Bottom half ===
First round
(United Kingdom) Clement Cazalet	6	4	6	7
(United Kingdom) Laurence Doherty	4	6	4	5
(United Kingdom) David Hawes	4	3	3
(United States) Arthur Foote	6	6	6
(United Kingdom) Wilberforce Eaves	5	6	6	6
(United Kingdom) Arthur Gore	7	4	2	1
(United Kingdom) Roy Allen	6	6	7
(United Kingdom) Arthur Kirby	1	3	5
(United Kingdom) Herbert Baddeley	6	6	4	6
(United Kingdom) H Marley	2	2	6	2
(United Kingdom) Alfred Crawley
(United Kingdom) Manliffe Goodbody	w/o
(United States) William Larned	6	7	6
(United Kingdom) Arthur Hallward	1	5	4

Second round
(United Kingdom) C Cazalet	6	9	6
(United States) A Foote	4	7	3
(United Kingdom) W Eaves	6	6	6
(United Kingdom) R Allen	0	2	1
(United Kingdom) H Baddeley	6	6	6
(United Kingdom) A Crawley	2	2	2
(United States) W Larned	6	6	6
(United Kingdom) Robert Hough	4	2	3

Quarterfinals
(United Kingdom) C Cazalet	5	3	0
(United Kingdom) W Eaves	7	6	6
(United Kingdom) H Baddeley	3	3	6	6	6
(United States) W Larned	6	6	4	4	3

Semifinals
(United Kingdom) W Eaves	6	6	6
(United Kingdom) H Baddeley	4	3	4

Preceded by 1895 U.S. National Championships – Men's singles	Grand Slam men's singles	Succeeded by 1897 U.S. National Championships – Men's singles
