= North of Ireland Championships =

Defunct tennis tournament
- Founded: 1879
- Abolished: 1894
- Editions: 15
- Location: Belfast, County Antrim, Ireland
- Venue: Cliftonville Cricket Club
- Surface: Grass

The North of Ireland Championships was an early Victorian period men's and women's grass court tennis tournament founded in 1879. The championship was played at the Cliftonville Cricket Club, Belfast, County Antrim, Ireland. The tournament ran annually for fifteen editions until 1894. It was the precursor tournament to the later Ulster Grass Court Championships.

== History ==
The regional tennis tournament the North of Ireland Championships tournament was established early as 1881, at the Cliftonville Cricket Club on Cliftonville Road in Belfast. Some time later the club was renamed as the Cliftonville Cricket and Lawn Tennis Club. The North of Ireland Championships tournament ran until 1894 when it was abandoned. cancelled after 1894.

Following World War One in 1919 new regional lawn tennis was established representative for Northern Ireland called the Ulster Grass Court Championships staged at the Belfast Boat Club, South Belfast. This grass court tournament ran until at least 1980. In 1928 a second regional tournament was established known as the Ulster Hard Court Championships that was played on clay courts that was staged through to the 1950s.

The former tournaments were both amateur events, but in the mid-1960s a professional event was staged in Belfast called the Ulster Professional Championships.

Notable male players who this championship includes Manliffe Goodbody who won it three times (1889, 1890, 1893). The North of Ireland and Ulster grass court tournaments have survived into the 21st century where today as two separate events is known as the North of Ireland Open, and the Ulster Senior Open.

== Finals ==
=== Men's singles ===
(incomplete roll)

| Year | Champion | Runner up | Score |
|---|---|---|---|
| 1879 | (England) Captain Short | (England) M. Short | 6–5, 4–6, 6–3 |
| 1881 | (Ireland) Edward Johnson Charley | (England) J.R. Bristow | 2–1 sets |
| 1882 | (England) George Frank Wemyss Anson | (Ireland) Edward Johnson Charley | 2–0 sets |
| 1885 | (England) Charle Milligan Johns | (England) Alfred Dawson Johns | 6–3, 6–3 |
| 1888 | (Ireland) Tegan Dickson | (Ireland) Robert Cully Barton | 6–0, 6–0 |
| 1889 | (Ireland) Manliffe Francis Goodbody | (Ireland) Tegan Dickson | 6–3, 6–2, 6–2 |
| 1890 | (Ireland) Manliffe Francis Goodbody (2) | (Ireland) Arthur Henry Gore Ashe | 5–7, 6–4, 6–0, 6–2 |
| 1891 | (Ireland) George Courtney Ball-Greene | (Ireland) Manliffe Francis Goodbody | w.o. |
| 1892 | (Ireland) Francis Owen Stoker | (Ireland) George Courtney Ball-Greene | w.o. |
| 1893 | (Ireland) Manliffe Francis Goodbody (3) | (Ireland) Francis Owen Stoker | w.o. |
| 1894 | (Ireland) Alexander Horsbrugh Porter | (United Kingdom) David Elgar Payn | 6–2, 6–1, 6–1 |

=== Women's singles ===
(incomplete roll)

| Year | Champion | Runner up | Score |
|---|---|---|---|
| 1890 | (Ireland) Miss. M.A. Kinahan | (Ireland) Miss Newett | 6–2, 6–0 |
| 1891 | (Ireland) Miss. Hearn | (Ireland) Miss. M.A. Kinahan | 6–2, 6–2 |
| 1892 | (Ireland) Miss. R. Shaw | (Ireland) Miss. Hearn | 4–6, 6–4, 6–1 |
| 1893 | (Ireland) Miss. R. Shaw (2) | (Scotland) Miss. Jane Corder | 3–6, 6–0, 9–7 |
| 1894 | (Ireland) Miss. R. Shaw (3) | (Ireland) Miss. F. Carr | 6–1, 6–1 |

== Sources ==
- Baily's Magazine of Sports and Pastimes (1889). Volume LI. January - June. Vinton & Co Ltd, London.
- Routledges Sporting Annual (1882) George Routledge and Son. London.
- The Belfast Telegraph (3 July 1965), Belfast, County Antrim, Northern Ireland.
