= Middlesex Championships =

Defunct tennis tournament
- Tour: Pre open era
- Founded: 1884
- Abolished: 1949
- Location: Chiswick Park, Chiswick, Middlesex, Great Britain
- Venue: Chiswick Park Lawn Tennis Club
- Surface: Grass

The Middlesex Championships. or Middlesex Lawn Tennis Championships and also known as the Middlesex Open Tennis Championships was a men's and women's grass court tennis founded at the Chiswick Park Lawn Tennis Club,Chiswick Park, Chiswick, Middlesex, Great Britain in 1884 and known as the Chiswick Park Club Open Lawn Tennis Tournament during the early editions of the event. The tournament was staged annually until 1949.

== History ==
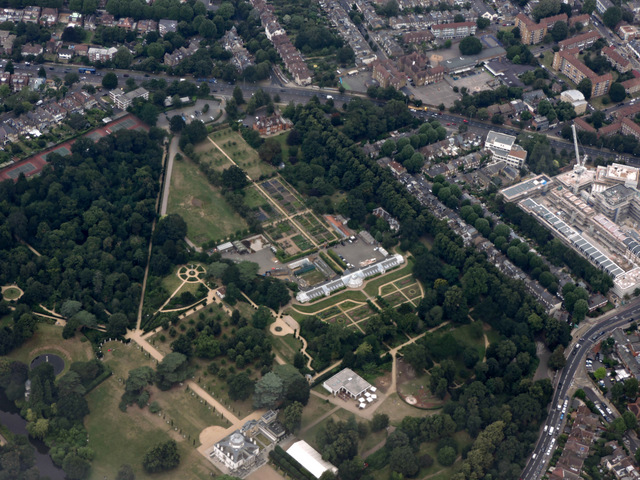
Chiswick Park, House and gardens from the air (2016) the location of this tournament.

In 1883 William Cavendish, 7th Duke of Devonshire decided to lease some of his land, with a low annual ground rent for the residents Chiswick who wanted to establish a sports club. This new sports ground staged bowls, cricket, football, and lawn tennis. In 1884 Chiswick Park Cricket and Lawn Tennis Club was formed and established a Middlesex County Championship tennis tournament. The championships were usually held annually at the end of July through to the third week August. In 1887 "Challenge Cups" were presented to the winners of the men's and women's singles events. In 1893 the scheduling of the tournament was altered to start at the end of May through to early June.

The Chiswick Park Lawn Tennis Club continued to stage the annual Championship of Middlesex, making the venue second only to Wimbledon in importance. In 1925 the land lease arrangement came to end due it expiring, however by this point the former tennis and cricket clubs had by this point formed into a business entity the Chiswick Cricket and Lawn Tennis Company. The tournament was not held during World War One and was postponed again in 1939 following the outbreak of World War Two. In 1946 the tournaments grounds were issued with a compulsory purchase by Brentford and Chiswick Urban District Council. After this tournament staged only three more times for the men's events, the women's events ended in 1946. The Middlesex Championships ran for 59 years, and was quite successful in attracting attract top players to four championships until 1949 when it was abolished.

Notable winners of the men's singles included Charles Walder Grinstead (1884), Ernest Wool Lewis (1886–1890, 1892), Athar-Ali Fyzee, (1921), Henry Mayes (1926) Daniel Prenn (1935), Czeslaw Spychala (1946) and Ghaus Mohammad (1947). Previous women's singles champions included Maud Shackle (1891–1893), Edith Austin Greville (1894, 1905), Molla Bjurstedt Mallory (1926) and Jadwiga Jędrzejowska (1938).

== Finals ==
=== Men's singles ===
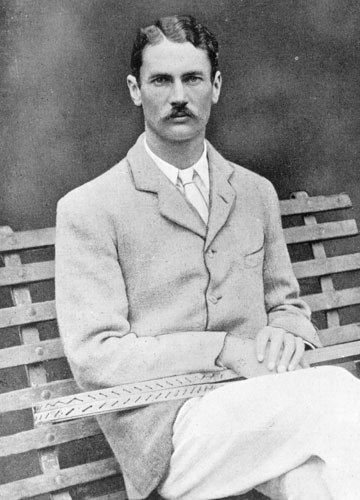
Harold Mahony won 6 singles titles.

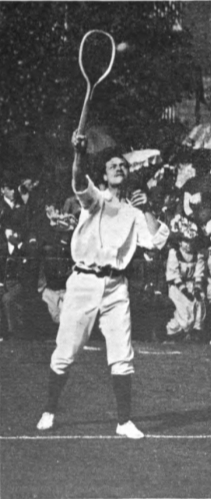
Ernest Wool Lewis won 4 consecutive singles titles.

(incomplete roll)

Year	Champion	Runner up	Score
1884	(England) Charles Walder Grinstead	(England) Donald Charles Stewart	6-1, 4–6, 12–10, 6–3.
1885	(England) Herbert Chipp	(England) Donald Charles Stewart	7-5, 7–5, 6–3.
1886	(England) Harry Grove	(England) Edward Lake Williams	6-3, 6–2, 6–3.
1887	(England) Ernest Wool Lewis	(England) Ernest George Meers	7-5, 3–6, 6–2, 6–3.
1888	(United Kingdom) Ernest Wool Lewis (2)	(United Kingdom) Ernest George Meers	6-2, 6–2, 6–2.
1889	(United Kingdom) Ernest Wool Lewis (3)	(United Kingdom) Harry S. Barlow	6-3, 6–3, 8–6.
1890	(United Kingdom) Ernest Wool Lewis (4)	(Ireland) Harold Mahony	6-1, 6–4, 6–2.
1891	(United Kingdom) Ernest George Meers	(United Kingdom) Ernest Wool Lewis	w.o.
1892	(United Kingdom) Ernest Wool Lewis (5)	(United Kingdom) Ernest George Meers	6-3, 6–4, 6–2.
1893	(Ireland) Harold Mahony	(United Kingdom) Ernest Wool Lewis	w.o.
1894	(United Kingdom) Harry S. Barlow	(Ireland) Harold Mahony	3-6, 6–3, 7–5, 6–1.
1895	(United Kingdom) Harry S. Barlow (2)	(United Kingdom) George Greville	6-4, 7–5, 4–6, 6–2.
1896	(Ireland) Harold Mahony	(United Kingdom) Harry S. Barlow	w.o.
1897	(United Kingdom) George Greville	(Ireland) Harold Mahony	6-4, 10–8, 5–7, 1–6, 6–1.
1898	(Ireland) Harold Mahony (2)	(United Kingdom) George Greville	4-6, 6–4, 7–5, 6–2.
1899	(Ireland) Harold Mahony (3)	(United Kingdom) George Greville	5-7, 2–6, 6–1, 6–1, 6–4.
1900	(Ireland) Harold Mahony (4)	(United Kingdom) Arthur Gore	6-2, 6–4, 6–2.
1901	(United Kingdom) George Greville (2)	(Ireland) Harold Mahony	7-5, 6–1, 4–6, 6–3.
1902	(United Kingdom) George Greville (3)	(United Kingdom) Roderick McNair	6-2, 6–0, 6–2.
1903	(Ireland) Harold Mahony (5)	(United Kingdom) Brame Hillyard	3-6, 6–2, 6–3, 3–6, 6–3.
1904	(Ireland) Harold Mahony (6)	(United Kingdom) Frederick William Payn	3-6, 6–1, 6–2, 6–4.
1905	(United Kingdom) George Miéville Simond	(United Kingdom) Henry Pollard	9-7, 3–6, 10–8.
1906	(United Kingdom) Major Ritchie	(United Kingdom) George Miéville Simond	6-1, 6–2, 6–4.
1907	(United Kingdom) Major Ritchie (2)	(United Kingdom) Granville Gilbert Sharp	6-3, 4–6, 6–0, 6–1.
1908	(United Kingdom) Major Ritchie (3)	(United Kingdom) Sydney Harman Adams	6-4, 6–1, 6–1.
1909	(United Kingdom) Charles P. Dixon	(United Kingdom) Percival Davson	6-4, 7–5, 6–3.
1910	(United Kingdom) Major Ritchie (4)	(United Kingdom) George Alan Thomas	7-5, 6–0, 6–0.
1915/1918	Not held (due to World War I)		
1919	(South Africa) Louis Bosman Raymond	(South Africa) Brian Norton	6-2, 6–1, 6–2.
1920	(United Kingdom) Randolph Lycett	(United Kingdom) Major Ritchie	6-1, 9–7, 6–8, 6–3.
1921	(India) Athar-Ali Fyzee	(United States) Frank Hunter	4-6, 6–1, 6–3, 6–4.
1922	(United Kingdom) Randolph Lycett (2)	(United Kingdom) Brian Gilbert	6-2, 6–2, 6–2.
1923	(South Africa) Brian Norton	(United Kingdom) Donald Greig	8-6, 6–2.
1924	(South Africa) Pat Spence	(South Africa) Louis Raymond	6-2, 6–3.
1925	(United Kingdom) Noel Turnbull	(United Kingdom) Teddy Higgs	6-1, 3–6, 4–6, 6–1, 6–4.
1926	(Canada) Henry Mayes	(United Kingdom) Pat Hughes	8-6, 10–8, 6–1.
1927	(United Kingdom) Jack Hillyard	(Republic of Ireland) Frank Crosbie	6-3, 6–3.
1928	(United Kingdom) Randolph Lycett (2)	(South Africa) Pat Spence	2-6, 7–5, 7–5, 6–4.
1929	(United Kingdom) William Powell	(Japan) Ryuki Miki	6-1, 4–6, 2–6, 6–3, 6–1.
1930	(United Kingdom) Fred Perry	(India) Atri Madan Mohan	7-5, 6–0.
1931	(United Kingdom) Ted Avory	(United Kingdom) William Powell	6-4, 6–3.
1932	(United Kingdom) Kenneth Dower	(United Kingdom) David H. Williams	6-3, 6–8, 6–2.
1933	(Japan) Iwao Aoki	(South Africa) Pat Spence	3-6, 7–5, 6–2.
1934	(United Kingdom) Frank Wilde	(United Kingdom) Colin Ritchie	6-4, 6–3.
1935	(Germany) Daniel Prenn	(Republic of Ireland) George Lyttleton-Rogers	6-4, 6–3.
1936	(United States) David Jones	(United Kingdom) Jimmy Jones	6-4, 6–2.
1937	(United Kingdom) Jimmy Jones	(United Kingdom) Murray Deloford	6-1, 6–1.
1938	(Republic of China (1912–1949)) Choy Wai-Chuen	(United Kingdom) Eric Filby	6-2, 6–4.
1939	(Republic of China (1912–1949)) Choy Wai-Chuen (2)	(United Kingdom) Eric Filby	6-4, 6–4.
1940/1945	Not held (due to World War II)		
1946	(Poland) Czeslaw Spychala	(Republic of China (1912–1949)) Choy Wai-Chuen	6-8, 6–2, 6–4.
1947	(India) Ghaus Mohammed Khan	(United Kingdom) Howard Walton	6-2, 6–2.
1948	(United Kingdom) Tim Lewis	(United Kingdom) Bernard Crouch	6-1, 6–3.
1949	(United Kingdom) Headley Baxter	(United Kingdom) Cliff Hovell	6-1, 7–5.

=== Women's singles ===
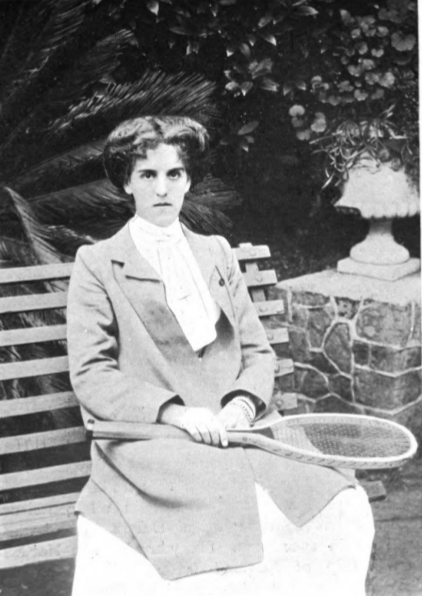
Dorothea Douglass-Chambers won 9 singles titles.

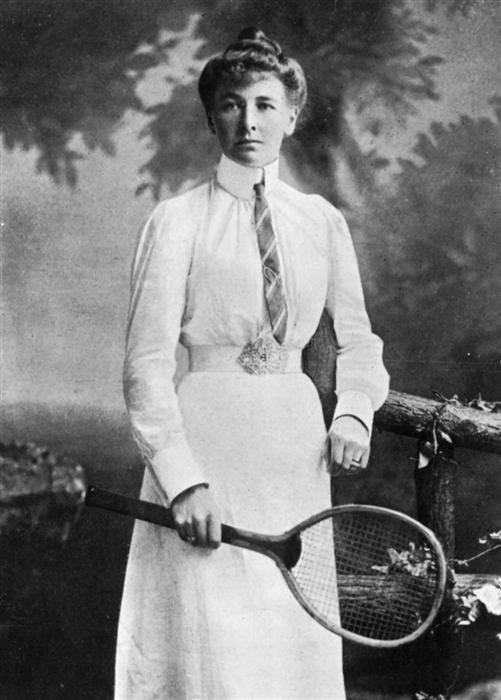
Charlotte Cooper won 4 consecutive singles titles.

(incomplete roll)

Year	Champion	Runner up	Score
1884	(England) Blanche Bingley	(England) Miss Wing	6-3, 6-3
1885	(England) Edith Gurney	(England) Blanche Bingley	1-6, 7–5, 6–0, retd.
1886	(England) Miss Douglas	(England) May Jacks	6-4, 6-0
1887	(England) Dorothy Patterson	(England) Edith Gurney	6-0, 4–6, 7-5
1888	(United Kingdom) Blanche Hillyard (2)	(United Kingdom) D. Patterson	6-2, 6-4
1889	(United Kingdom) Mary Steedman	(United Kingdom) Bertha Steedman	6-4, 7-5
1890	(United Kingdom) Mary Steedman (2)	(United Kingdom) May Jacks	6-2, 6-2
1891	(United Kingdom) Maud Shackle	(United Kingdom) Edith Austin	6-0, 6-1
1892	(United Kingdom) Maud Shackle (2)	(United Kingdom) Edith Austin	6-4, 6-0
1893	(United Kingdom) Maud Shackle (3)	(United Kingdom) Edith Austin	6-3, 6-4
1894	(United Kingdom) Edith Austin	(United Kingdom) A. Brown	6-3, 6-3
1895	(United Kingdom) Charlotte Cooper	(United Kingdom) Edith Austin	6-3, 7-5
1896	(United Kingdom) Charlotte Cooper (2)	(United Kingdom) Edith Austin	6-4, 6-2
1897	(United Kingdom) Charlotte Cooper (3)	(United Kingdom) Edith Austin	1-6, 6–4, 6-4
1898	(United Kingdom) Charlotte Cooper (4)	(United Kingdom) Edith Austin	6-3, 3–6, 7-5
1899	(United Kingdom) Edith Austin (2)	(United Kingdom) Charlotte Cooper	7-5, 6-4
1900	(United Kingdom) Charlotte Cooper (5)	(United Kingdom) Edith Austin Greville	6-3, 9-7
1901	(United Kingdom) Charlotte Cooper Sterry (6)	(United Kingdom) Toupie Lowther	6-3, 6-2
1902	(United Kingdom) Charlotte Cooper Sterry (7)	(United Kingdom) Edith Bromfield	6-1, 6-0
1903	(United Kingdom) Dorothea Douglass	(United Kingdom) Edith Bromfield	6-4, 9-7
1904	(United Kingdom) Dorothea Douglass (2)	(United Kingdom) Charlotte Cooper Sterry	4-6, 6–1, 6-3
1905	(United Kingdom) Edith Austin Greville (3)	(United Kingdom) Mabel Squire	6-4, 7-5
1906	(United Kingdom) Dorothea Douglass (3)	(United Kingdom) Charlotte Cooper Sterry	6-1, 6-0
1907	(United Kingdom) Dorothea Chambers (4)	(United Kingdom) Maud Brown	6-3, 6-1
1908	(United Kingdom) Dorothea Chambers (5)	(United Kingdom) Alice Greene	7-5, 6-4
1909	(United Kingdom) Beryl Tulloch	(United Kingdom) Agnes Daniell Tuckey	6-3, 4–6, 7-5
1910	(United Kingdom) Dorothea Chambers (6)	(United Kingdom) M. Messom	6-2, 6-2
1911	(United Kingdom) Dorothea Chambers (7)	(United Kingdom) Mabel Parton	6-3, 6-2
1912	(United Kingdom) Dorothy Holman	(United Kingdom) Mabel Squire Parton	6-2, 4–6, 7-5
1913	(United Kingdom) Dorothea Chambers (8)	(United Kingdom) Dora Boothby	6-2, 6-3
1914	(United Kingdom) Dorothea Chambers (9)	(United Kingdom) Aurea Edgington	walkover
1915/1918	Not held (due to World War I)		
1919	(United States) Elizabeth Ryan	(United Kingdom) Geraldine Beamish	6-2, 4–6, 6-4
1920	(United States) Elizabeth Ryan (2)	(United Kingdom) Dorothea Chambers	7-5, 6-2
1921	(United States) Elizabeth Ryan (3)	(United Kingdom) Geraldine Beamish	6-3, 6-4
1922	(India) Irene Bowder Peacock	(United Kingdom) Geraldine Beamish	6-1, 1–6, 6-2
1923	(United Kingdom) Kathleen McKane	(United States) Molla Bjurstedt Mallory	6-3, 6-2
1924	(United Kingdom) Kathleen McKane (2)	(United States) Elizabeth Ryan	6-4, 6-4
1925	(United States) Elizabeth Ryan (4)	(United Kingdom) Geraldine Beamish	6-4, 6-0
1926	(United States) Molla Bjurstedt Mallory	(United Kingdom) Gwen Sterry	6-3, 1–6, 6-1
1927	(United States) Elizabeth Ryan (5)	(United Kingdom) Joan Fry	6-0, 4–6, 6-2
1928	(United Kingdom) Ermyntrude Harvey	(United Kingdom) Madge Valantine List	6-1, 6-3
1929	(United Kingdom) Peggy Saunders Michell	(United Kingdom) Margaret McKane Stocks	6-3, 6-1
1930	(United Kingdom) Betty Nuthall	(India) Jenny Sandison	9-7, 6-3
1931	(United Kingdom) Elsie Goldsack Pittman	(United Kingdom) Peggy Saunders Michell	9-7, 6-2
1932	(United Kingdom) Nancy Lyle	(India) Irene Bowder Peacock	6-4, 6-4
1933	(United Kingdom) Violet Chamberlain Owen	(United Kingdom) Elsie Goldsack Pittman	6-4, 6-2
1934	(United Kingdom) Elsie Goldsack Pittman (2)	(United Kingdom) Joan Ridley	6-4, 6-4
1935	(United Kingdom) Susan Noel	(United Kingdom) Elsie Goldsack Pittman	6-1, 8-6
1936	(United Kingdom) Mary Hardwick	(United Kingdom) Nancy Lyle	4-6, 7–5, 7-5
1937	(Chile) Anita Lizana	(United States) Alice Marble	9-7, 9-7
1938	(Poland) Jadwiga Jędrzejowska	(United States) Dorothy Bundy	7-5, 6-2
1939	(United Kingdom) Jean Saunders	(United Kingdom) A. Cardinall	6-4, 6-3
1940/1945	Not held (due to World War I)		
1946	Women's event (discontinued)		

== Tournament records ==
=== Men ===
- Most singles titles: (Ireland) Harold Mahony (6)
- Most singles finals: (Ireland) Harold Mahony (10)
- Most consecutive singles titles: (United Kingdom) Ernest Wool Lewis (4)

=== Women ===
- Most singles titles: (United Kingdom) Dorothea Chambers (9)
- Most singles finals: (United Kingdom) Edith Austin Greville (11)
- Most consecutive singles titles: (United Kingdom) Charlotte Cooper (4)

== Sources ==
- Baily's Magazine of Sports & Pastimes. London: Vinton and Co Limited. 1896.
- Clegg, Gill. "Entertainment :Chiswick Park Lawn Tennis Club". brentfordandchiswicklhs.org.uk. Brentford and Chiswick Local History Society. Retrieved 4 October 2022.
- Heathcote, J. M. Heathacote: C. G. (1890). Tennis; Lawn Tennis. London: Spottiswoode, Ballantyne & co. ltd.
- Tennis Championships. Kalgoorlie Miner. Trove: National Library of Australia. 31 May 1922. Retrieved 4 October 2022.
