= 1893 Wimbledon Championships =

- Date: 10 – 20 July
- Edition: 17th
- Category: Grand Slam
- Surface: Grass
- Location: Worple Road; SW19, Wimbledon, London, United Kingdom
- Venue: All England Lawn Tennis Club

Champions

Men's singles
- (United Kingdom) Joshua Pim

Women's singles
- (United Kingdom) Lottie Dod

Men's doubles
- (United Kingdom) Joshua Pim / (United Kingdom) Frank Stoker
- Wimbledon Championships

The 1893 Wimbledon Championships took place on the outdoor grass courts at the All England Lawn Tennis Club in Wimbledon, London, United Kingdom. The tournament ran from 10 July until 20 July. It was the 17th staging of the Wimbledon Championships, and the first Grand Slam tennis event of 1893.

== Champions ==
=== Men's singles ===
(United Kingdom) Joshua Pim defeated (United Kingdom) Wilfred Baddeley, 3–6, 6–1, 6–3, 6–2

=== Women's singles ===
(United Kingdom) Lottie Dod defeated (United Kingdom) Blanche Hillyard, 6–8, 6–1, 6–4

=== Men's doubles ===
(United Kingdom) Joshua Pim / (United Kingdom) Frank Stoker defeated (United Kingdom) Harry Barlow / (United Kingdom) Ernest Lewis, 4–6, 6–3, 6–1, 2–6, 6–0

Preceded by 1892 U.S. National Championships	Grand Slams	Succeeded by 1893 U.S. National Championships
