= Surrey Closed County Championship =

Defunct tennis tournament
- Founded: 1890
- Abolished: 1890
- Editions: 1
- Location: Old Deer Park, Richmond-upon-Thames, Surrey, England
- Venue: Athletic Association Ground
- Surface: Grass

The Surrey Closed County Championship was a Victorian era men's grass court tennis tournament staged June 1890, The tournament was staged at the Athletic Association Ground, Old Deer Park, Richmond-upon-Thames, Surrey, England. This event was held one time and was closed tournament for tennis players from Surrey only.

== History ==
The Surrey Closed County Championship was a men's grass court tennis held in June 1890 at the same time as the Surrey Championships, that was an open event for all comers. The tournament was played on outdoor grass courts and was open to players only from Surrey. The men's singles event was won by Harry Sibthorpe Barlow who defeated Wilfred Baddeley.

== Notes ==
Closed tournaments: Entries to “closed” tournaments are restricted, normally by a requirement of residency within a specified geographic area.

== Sources ==
- Adult Tournament Options: Tournament Formats" (PDF). www.usta.com. USTA Mid Atlantic. Retrieved 2 December 2022.
- 1877 to 2012 Finals Results: 1890. (2022). stevegtennis.com. Steve G Tennis.
- Sporting Life. (Friday 13 June 1890). Lawn Tennis: Surrey County Championships Meeting. London. England.
