= 1896 Wimbledon Championships =

- Date: 13 – 21 July
- Edition: 20th
- Category: Grand Slam
- Surface: Grass
- Location: Worple Road; SW19, Wimbledon, London, United Kingdom
- Venue: All England Lawn Tennis Club

Champions

Men's singles
- (United Kingdom) Harold Mahony

Women's singles
- (United Kingdom) Charlotte Cooper

Men's doubles
- (United Kingdom) Herbert Baddeley / (United Kingdom) Wilfred Baddeley
- Wimbledon Championships

The 1896 Wimbledon Championships took place on the outdoor grass courts at the All England Lawn Tennis Club in Wimbledon, London, United Kingdom. The tournament ran from 13 July until 21 July. It was the 20th staging of the Wimbledon Championships, and the first Grand Slam tennis event of 1896. The number of entries for the men's singles competition was 31, the highest since 1881. Harold Mahony and Charlotte Cooper won the singles titles. The All England Plate was introduced for players who had lost in the first or second round of the singles.

== Champions ==
=== Men's singles ===
(United Kingdom) Harold Mahony defeated (United Kingdom) Wilfred Baddeley, 6–2, 6–8, 5–7, 8–6, 6–3

=== Women's singles ===
(United Kingdom) Charlotte Cooper defeated (United Kingdom) Alice Simpson Pickering, 6–2, 6–3

=== Men's doubles ===
(United Kingdom) Herbert Baddeley / (United Kingdom) Wilfred Baddeley defeated (United Kingdom) Reginald Doherty / (United Kingdom) Harold Nisbet, 1–6, 3–6, 6–4, 6–2, 6–1

Preceded by 1895 U.S. National Championships	Grand Slams	Succeeded by 1896 U.S. National Championships
