= 1895 Wimbledon Championships – Women's singles =

Women's singles
- 1895 Wimbledon Championships

Final
- Champion: (United Kingdom) Charlotte Cooper
- Runner-up: (United Kingdom) Helen Jackson
- Score: 7–5, 8–6

Details
- Draw: 9
- Seeds: –

Events
Singles	men	women
Doubles	men	women
← 1894 ·	Wimbledon Championships	· 1896 →

Charlotte Cooper defeated Helen Jackson 7–5, 8–6 in the all comers' final to win the ladies' singles tennis title at the 1895 Wimbledon Championships. The reigning champion Blanche Hillyard did not defend her title.

== Draw ==
Key

- Q = Qualifier
- WC = Wild card
- LL = Lucky loser
- Alt = Alternate
- ITF = ITF entry
- PR = Protected ranking
- SR = Special ranking
- SE = Special exempt
- JE = Junior exempt
- JR = Junior Accelerator Programme entrant
- CO = College Accelerator Programme entrant
- NG = Next Gen Accelerator Program entrant
- w/o = Walkover
- r = Retired
- d = Defaulted

=== All Comers' ===
First round
(United Kingdom) Helen Jackson	7	6
(United Kingdom) Jane Corder	5	3

Quarterfinals
(United Kingdom) Alice Pickering	3	6	6
(United Kingdom) Maud Shackle	6	3	3
(United Kingdom) Miss Bernard	0	2
(United Kingdom) Helen Jackson	6	6
(United Kingdom) Charlotte Cooper	6	9	6
(United Kingdom) Lottie Paterson	3	11	2
(United Kingdom) Beatrice Draffen	6	6
(United Kingdom) Henrietta Horncastle	2	0

Semifinals
(United Kingdom) Alice Pickering	4	6	6
(United Kingdom) Helen Jackson	6	3	8
(United Kingdom) Charlotte Cooper	6	6	6
(United Kingdom) Beatrice Draffen	2	8	1

Final
(United Kingdom) Helen Jackson	5	6
(United Kingdom) Charlotte Cooper	7	8

Preceded by 1894 U.S. National Championships – Women's singles	Grand Slam women's singles	Succeeded by 1895 U.S. National Championships – Women's singles
