= Archdale Palmer =

British tennis player (1865–1950)

- Archdale Palmer, photograph from Le lawn-tennis moderne (1909) by P.-A. Vaile
- Full name: Archdale Palmer
- Country (sports): United Kingdom
- Born: 1865 Epping, Essex, United Kingdom
- Died: 9 February 1950 (aged 84) Epping, Essex, United Kingdom
- Turned pro: 1889 (amateur tour)
- Retired: 1907

Grand Slam singles results
- Wimbledon: SF (1893)

Grand Slam doubles results
- Wimbledon: SF (1892, 1893)

Archdale Palmer (1865–1950) was a British tennis player in the early years of the Wimbledon tournament, lawn tennis administrator, and businessman.

== Life ==
He was the only son of Archdale Villiers Palmer (1832–1908) of Nazeing Park, formerly of the Bengal Civil Service, and his wife Helen Tayler; the barrister William Palmer was a great-uncle. In the previous generation were George Palmer, his great-grandfather, the judge Ralph Palmer and John Horsley Palmer, sons of the merchant William Palmer of Nazeing. He was educated at Winchester College. He served in the Second Boer War with the Post Office Rifles, having joined the unit as the 24th Middlesex Rifle Volunteers in 1889, with rank second lieutenant.

Palmer lost his opening match at Wimbledon 1892 to Harry Barlow. He reached the Wimbledon semifinals in 1893, losing to Harold Mahony. In 1894 he lost his opening match at Wimbledon to Herbert Baddeley. In 1893 Palmer won the Dinard men's singles title beating Arthur Gore in the Challenge Round in five sets. Palmer became Secretary of the All England Lawn Tennis Club in 1899, when Reginald Doherty was the leading player, but finances were in the doldrums. He was appointed managing director of Slazenger in 1905. His position at Slazenger was considered a conflict of interest by the A.E.L.T. C. (Slazenger manufactured the balls used at Wimbledon). Palmer resigned as Secretary in 1906. Lowerson wrote of "the acumen and rather sharp practices of [Slazenger's] manager, Archdale Palmer, who dragged the firm into a scandal amid allegations of attempted bribery at Wimbledon in 1905." Palmer continued to work at Slazenger. Palmer also played real tennis, and was defeated in 1911 in the championship at the Queen's Club by the eventual winner Neville Stephen Lytton.

In World War I Palmer was Captain in the Essex Regiment. He was invalided out, giving up his temporary commission on grounds of ill health on 3 March 1915. In 1918 he was master of the Mercers' Company, an office held by his great-grandfather George Palmer in 1821. He retired from Slazenger around 1925, and, appointed in 1924, he served as a magistrate for Waltham Abbey and Chingford for 22 years. He died on 9 February 1950 at the family home, Rookswood, Upper Nazeing, at age 84.
