= 1896 Wimbledon Championships – Women's singles =

Women's singles
- 1896 Wimbledon Championships

Final
- Champion: (United Kingdom) Charlotte Cooper
- Runner-up: (United Kingdom) Alice Pickering
- Score: 6–2, 6–3

Details
- Draw: 6
- Seeds: –

Events
Singles	men	women
Doubles	men	women
← 1895 ·	Wimbledon Championships	· 1897 →

Alice Pickering defeated Edith Austin 4–6, 6–3, 6–3 in the All Comers' Final, but the reigning champion Charlotte Cooper defeated Simpson Pickering 6–2, 6–3 in the challenge round to win the ladies' singles tennis title at the 1896 Wimbledon Championships.

== Draw ==
=== Key ===
- Q = Qualifier
- WC = Wild card
- LL = Lucky loser
- Alt = Alternate
- SE = Special exempt
- PR = Protected ranking
- ITF = ITF entry
- JE = Junior exempt
- w/o = Walkover
- r = Retired
- d = Defaulted
- SR = Special ranking

=== Challenge round ===
Challenge Round
(United Kingdom) Alice Pickering	2	3
(United Kingdom) Charlotte Cooper	6	6

=== All Comers' ===
Quarterfinals			Semifinals			Final
			(United Kingdom) Henrietta Horncastle	w/o
(United Kingdom) Edith Austin	6	6	(United Kingdom) Edith Austin
(United Kingdom) Lottie Paterson	4	1				(United Kingdom) Edith Austin	6	3	3
(United Kingdom) Alice Pickering	6	6				(United Kingdom) Alice Pickering	4	6	6
(United Kingdom) Miss Hungerford	1	0	(United Kingdom) Alice Pickering	6	7
			(United Kingdom) Beatrice Draffen	3	5

Preceded by 1895 U.S. National Championships – Women's singles	Grand Slam women's singles	Succeeded by 1896 U.S. National Championships – Women's singles
