= 1894 Wimbledon Championships =

- Date: 9 – 18 July
- Edition: 18th
- Category: Grand Slam
- Surface: Grass
- Location: Worple Road; SW19, Wimbledon, London, United Kingdom
- Venue: All England Lawn Tennis Club

Champions

Men's singles
- (United Kingdom) Joshua Pim

Women's singles
- (United Kingdom) Blanche Hillyard

Men's doubles
- (United Kingdom) Herbert Baddeley / (United Kingdom) Wilfred Baddeley
- Wimbledon Championships

The 1894 Wimbledon Championships took place on the outdoor grass courts at the All England Lawn Tennis Club in Wimbledon, London, United Kingdom. The tournament ran from 9 July until 18 July. It was the 18th staging of the Wimbledon Championships, and the first Grand Slam tennis event of 1894.

== Champions ==
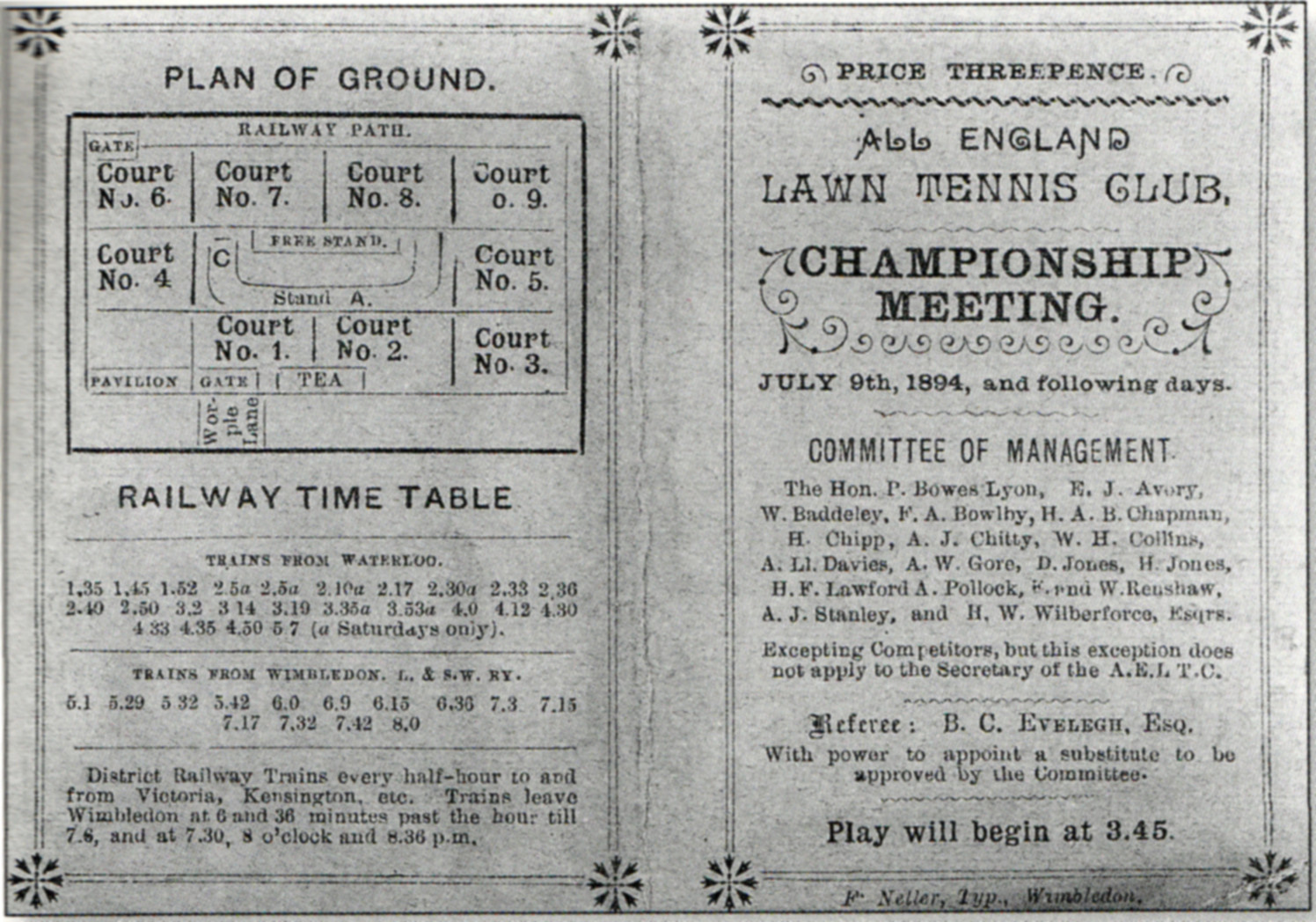
1894 Wimbledon program

=== Men's singles ===
(United Kingdom) Joshua Pim defeated (United Kingdom) Wilfred Baddeley, 10–8, 6–2, 8–6

=== Women's singles ===
(United Kingdom) Blanche Hillyard defeated (United Kingdom) Edith Austin, 6–1, 6–1

=== Men's doubles ===
(United Kingdom) Herbert Baddeley / (United Kingdom) Wilfred Baddeley defeated (United Kingdom) Harry Barlow / (United Kingdom) C. H. Martin, 5–7, 7–5, 4–6, 6–3, 8–6

Preceded by 1893 U.S. National Championships	Grand Slams	Succeeded by 1894 U.S. National Championships
