= Ralph Palmer (judge) =

British judge

Ralph Palmer (11 April 1783 – 25 January 1838) was a British judge who served as the 4th Chief Justice of Madras, in British India, from 1825 to 1835.

== Personal life ==
His parents were William Palmer and Mary Horsley. He married Margaret Eliza Fearon in 1829.
