= Harold Nisbet =

British lawn tennis player

- Full name: Harold Adair Nisbet
- Country (sports): United Kingdom
- Born: 22 June 1873 Kilburn, England
- Died: 12 March 1937 (aged 63) London, England

Singles
- Career record: 77–34 (69.3%)
- Career titles: 5

Grand Slam singles results
- Wimbledon: SF (1896, 1900)
- US Open: F (1897)

Grand Slam doubles results
- Wimbledon: F (1896, 1898, 1899, 1900)
- US Open: F (1897)

Harold Adair Nisbet (22 June 1873 – 12 March 1937) was a British lawn tennis player who was active at the end of the 19th century and beginning of the 20th century.

During his career he reached four doubles finals at the Wimbledon Championships (1896, 1898, 1899, 1900) as well as the doubles final at the U.S. National Championships in 1897. In singles, Nisbet reached the all-comers final of the U.S. National Championships in 1897 (losing to Wilberforce Eaves) and the semifinals of Wimbledon in 1896 (losing in five sets to Harold Mahony) and 1900 (losing to Sydney Smith in straight sets).

== Grand Slam finals ==
=== Singles (1 final) ===
==== All-Comers ====
| Result | Year | Championship | Surface | Opponent | Score |
|---|---|---|---|---|---|
| Loss | 1897 | U.S. Championships | Grass | (United Kingdom) Wilberforce Eaves | 5–7, 3–6, 2–6 |

=== Doubles (5 runner-ups) ===
| Result | Year | Championship | Surface | Partner | Opponents | Score |
|---|---|---|---|---|---|---|
| Loss | 1896 | Wimbledon | Grass | (United Kingdom of Great Britain and Ireland) Reginald Doherty | (United Kingdom of Great Britain and Ireland) Wilfred Baddeley (United Kingdom of Great Britain and Ireland) Herbert Baddeley | 6–1, 6–3, 4–6, 2–6, 1–6 |
| Loss | 1897 | U.S. Championships | Grass | (United Kingdom of Great Britain and Ireland) Harold Mahony | (United States) Leo Ware (United States) George Sheldon | 13–11, 2–6, 7–9, 6–1, 1–6 |
| Loss | 1898 | Wimbledon | Grass | (United States) Clarence Hobart | (United Kingdom) Reginald Doherty (United Kingdom) Laurence Doherty | 4–6, 4–6, 2–6 |
| Loss | 1899 | Wimbledon | Grass | (United States) Clarence Hobart | (United Kingdom) Reginald Doherty (United Kingdom) Laurence Doherty | 5–7, 0–6, 2–6 |
| Loss | 1900 | Wimbledon | Grass | (United Kingdom) Herbert Roper Barrett | (United Kingdom) Reginald Doherty (United Kingdom) Laurence Doherty | 7–9, 5–7, 6–4, 6–3, 3–6 |
