= George Hillyard =

British tennis player

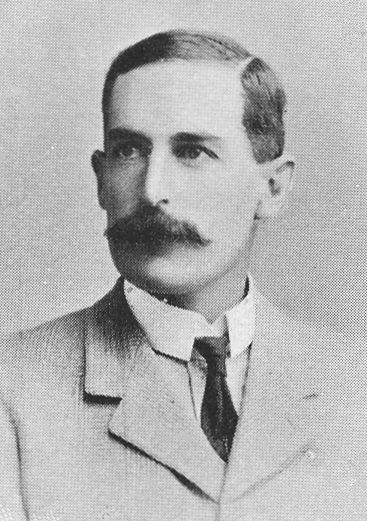
- Full name: George Whiteside Hillyard
- Country (sports): Great Britain
- Born: 6 February 1864 Hanwell, UK
- Died: 24 March 1943 (aged 79) Pulborough, UK
- Height: 6 ft 2 in (1.88 m)

Singles
- Career record: 335–111 (75.1%)
- Career titles: 20

Grand Slam singles results
- Wimbledon: QF (1889, 1897, 1901)

Other tournaments
- Olympic Games: 2R (1908)

Grand Slam doubles results
- Wimbledon: F (1889, 1890)

Other doubles tournaments
- Olympic Games: W (1908)
Medal record
Representing Great Britain
Tennis, Summer Olympics
Gold medal – first place	1908 London	Outdoor doubles

George Whiteside Hillyard (6 February 1864 – 24 March 1943) was a male tennis player from the United Kingdom. Under his supervision as secretary of the All England Club from 1907 to 1925, the Wimbledon Championships moved to its current site at Church Road. Hillyard also excelled at cricket and golf.

== Biography ==
=== Early years ===
George Whiteside Hillyard was born in Hanwell, Middlesex on 6 February 1864, the only child of George Wright Hillyard (1817–1896) and his second wife Mary Mansfield (1827–?). His father had been a police officer at Welwyn, Hertfordshire by 1840 and later worked in the Nottingham County Jail before becoming superintendent at the Central London District School in West London in 1861. After his first wife Lucy had died in early 1862, he married Mary Mansfield in December the same year.

In 1877, at 13 years old, Hillyard was sent to the Britannia Royal Naval College as a cadet. In 1879, he was promoted to midshipman and was assigned to HMS Bacchante which toured the colonies of the British Empire around the world from 1880 to 1882. Among his fellow midshipmen were Prince Albert and Prince George (later King George V).

Hillyard resigned from the Navy with the rank of sub-lieutenant on 2 October 1885. His last posting was aboard HMS Minotaur.

=== Marriage and tennis career ===
Hillyard had been already introduced to tennis at the age of ten by his uncle, who had set up a Sphairistike court in 1875. However, he didn't like what he called "pat-ball" at first, and preferred cricket. After his Navy service, however, the rules of the game had undergone significant changes and Hillyard became attracted to it. From 1887, he began to play tournaments.

Hillyard married Blanche Bingley (1863–1946) in Greenford on 13 July 1887, one week after the Wimbledon final. Blanche was the daughter of a wealthy tailoring business proprietor from London, and a successful tennis player. She had won the Wimbledon Championships in the previous year, and would win another five singles titles at Wimbledon alone until 1900. Blanche brought a considerable fortune into the marriage. Only five days after the wedding, the newly married couple competed at the Middlesex Championships at Chiswick Park, and won the mixed doubles title.

In 1889, Hillyard played the Wimbledon singles for the first time. He lost his quarter-final match against Harry Barlow in straight sets. He reached the doubles final twice at Wimbledon with Ernest Lewis in 1889 and 1890, but lost to the Renshaw brothers and Joshua Pim and Frank Stoker, respectively. Alongside Harry Scrivener, he won the doubles title at the British Covered Court Championships in 1890 and 1891. The following years, his focus shifted again to cricket, playing for Leicestershire, until 1896 when he won the singles, doubles, singles handicap and mixed doubles (with his wife) at Monte Carlo. In 1897, he won the first staging of the International German Championships at Hamburg, beating George Ball-Greene in five sets in the final. He repeated his success at Hamburg in 1900. At Wimbledon singles, early losses enabled him to win the All England Plate in 1898, and reach the final in 1899. At the 1901 Wimbledon singles, he beat Laurence Doherty in the third round before losing in the quarter-finals to Arthur Gore.

In 1905, at 41 years of age, Hillyard lost the final at the Championship of Europe in Bad Homburg against Anthony Wilding. He entered the Wimbledon Championships 1906, conceding a walkover to Arthur Gore. Being assigned secretary of the All England Club in 1907, he never entered the Championships again. However, he did continue to play minor tournaments such as at Eastbourne, Yorkshire and Leicester until 1914. After the Great War, at 55 years of age, he competed at his home tournament at Leicester and even won the mixed doubles alongside Gladys Lamplough.

In 1908, he competed at the London Olympic Games and won the gold medal in doubles alongside Reginald Doherty. However, although being great fan of the Olympics in general, he was less enthusiastic about the idea of tennis being a part of it. In his book Forty Years of First Class Lawn Tennis, published in 1924, he wrote: "As for lawn tennis in conjunction with the Olympic Games, the whole thing is a inconguous farce. You could as well have Olympic cricket or Olympic golf. It is difficult to believe that players or public can treat the matter seriously or care two straws about it. Why it is wanted, or tolerated, when we already have the Davis Cup, is beyond my comprehension."

=== Cricket ===
Lord Hawke's cricket team to North America in 1891/92. Hillyard is in the back row, 2nd from left.

During his time at the Navy, Hillyard played a lot of different sports, but concentrated on cricket, and even was captain of the cricket team for two years. Afterwards, he made his first appearance for Middlesex against the Marylebone Cricket Club in 1886. Although initially quite successful, he soon thereafter realized he had great difficulties to compete on a first-class level. Consequently, from 1887 to 1890 he virtually retired, blaming his time at the Navy which allegedly had prevented him from practising more. However, in 1891, he took cricket up again and played some first-class matches for the MCC as well as the Gentlemen Players. Later that year, he participated in a trip of English cricketers to North America led by Lord Hawke in winter 1891/92. There, Hillyard played both first-class matches at Philadelphia. In 1894, Lord Hawke arranged another trip to North America, and Hillyard was again member of the party. At Philadelphia, he played in front of an audience of 10,000.

Upon his return, Hillyard occasionally played cricket for another two years, making a total of 49 first-class matches in his career. After 1896, he fully committed himself to tennis.

=== Thorpe Satchville ===
Hillyard and his wife lived at Leicestershire from at least 1893. In 1896, they moved into a large house with extensive grounds at Thorpe Satchville, a small village near Leicester. The mansion provided nine bedrooms as well as two tennis courts and a nine-hole golf course. The Hillyards frequently hosted popular house parties with tennis champions such as Norman Brookes, Harold Mahony, Anthony Wilding, May Sutton, Violet Pinckney and Dora Boothby as guests. Until 1914, almost every strong foreign player who played at Wimbledon stayed at the home of the Hillyards.

=== Secretary of the AEC, En-tout-cas ===
Hillyard, a long-time member of the All England Club along with his wife, was its secretary from 1907 to early 1925. One of his major concerns was the upkeep of the courts, and he insisted on high standards of court maintenance. In 1910, the club purchased a motor roller for the courts in order to replace the horse roller.

With the success of the Wimbledon tournament, the necessity to move the ground from his initial location at Worple Road to a larger site became obvious. This had been discussed as early as Hillyard became secretary in 1907, but searching for a better suitable site took time, and the outbreak of World War I further postponed the issue. From 1914 to 1918, Hillyard rejoined the Navy, leaving it with the rank of commander. After the war, the decision to build a new ground was confirmed in 1919. The new site was opened at the 1922 Wimbledon Championships. After the 1919 Wimbledon Championships, the decision to build a new ground was confirmed. As the secretary, Hillyard was probably heavily involved in the search for, and selection of the new site at Church Road, and worked together with architect Stanley Peach. The new site was opened at the 1922 Wimbledon Championships.

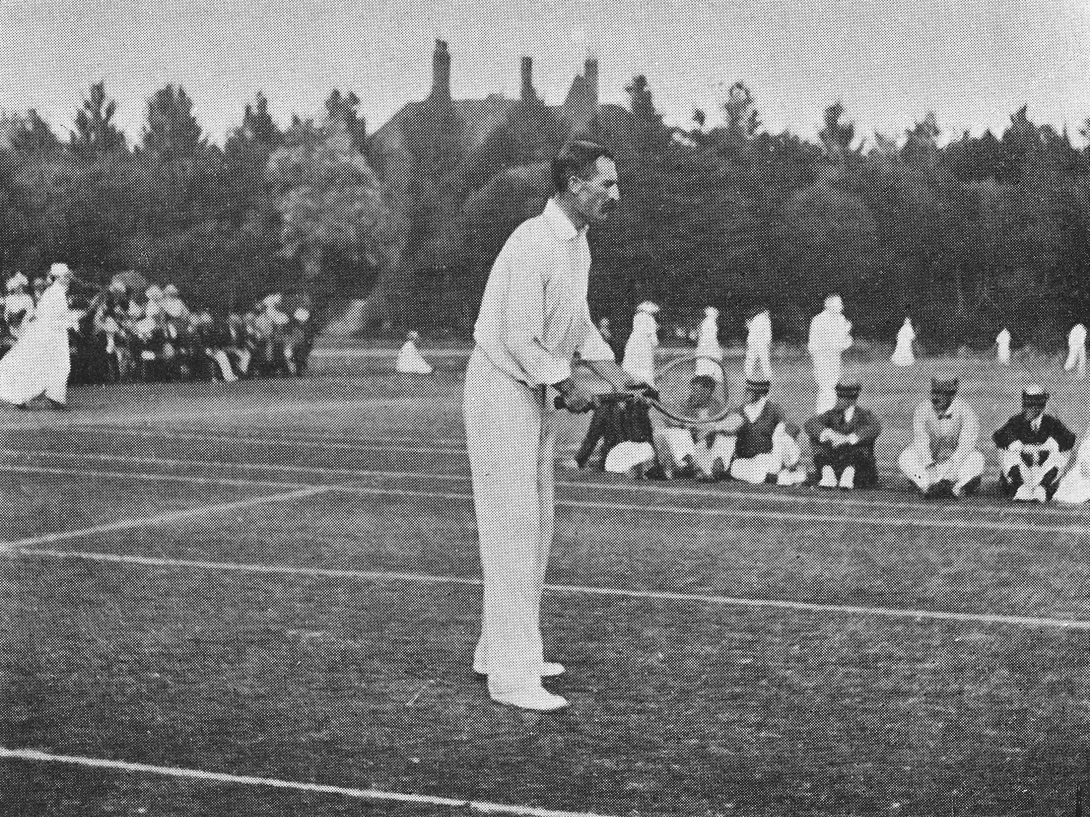
George Hillyard at Eastbourne

Beside his secretary post, Hillyard also was an umpire at Wimbledon. From 1919 to 1932, he umpired every ladies final.

Being passionate about building perfect grass courts, Hillyard kept thinking about how to construct an equally good all-weather court. In 1909, he met Claude Brown, a manager of a nearly bankrupt brickyard at Syston near Leicester. Hillyard had been on a tennis tour in South Africa the winter before where he had played on courts made of crushed up ant heaps. He told this story to Brown, and both developed the idea of using crushed bricks for court surface. The first court was laid out at Hillyard's home at Thorpe Satchville, and was called En-tout-cas (literally "in all cases") upon the idea of a guest, a French lady. Brown renamed his company after it. By 1914, business boomed across England. An agent was hired for the United States market, and the company turned into a multimillion-pound business. When the Championships moved to its new site at Church Road in 1922, nine en-tout-cas courts were laid beside the grass courts. For many years, the British Junior Championships were played on clay surfaces from En-Tout-Cas.

Hillyard's relationship to the En-tout-cas company throughout the years is somewhat diffuse. Clearly, he was in the perfect position to promote the court surface, and he was certainly involved in the decision to construct en-tout-cas courts at the new Wimbledon grounds, giving them a marketing coup. In 1929, when being involved in the construction of a golf course – a job which was given to En-tout-cas on Hillyard's recommendation; he eventually disclosed that he was a director of En-tout-cas, thus obviously receiving income from the company.

=== Final years ===
In 1925, at an age of 61, Hillyard resigned from his position as secretary of the All England Club. In the same year, he sold his house at Thorpe Satchville, and the Hillyards moved to Bramfold, Pulborough, Sussex. Their new house was of similar size, and Hillyard again constructed two tennis courts, but began to focus on playing golf. Upon his initiative, a new golf course was completed at the West Sussex Golf Club, and opened on 8 August 1930.

Hillyard died at his home on 25 March 1943, aged 79. His wife Blanche was to survive him for three years. The couple had two children, Jack (1891–1983) and Marjorie (1895–?). Jack was also a tennis player, competing at Wimbledon in the 1920s and reaching the final of the All England Plate in 1924. Marjorie was mentally handicapped and stayed with her parents until the death of her mother. She spent the rest of her life at a care home in West Sussex.

== Grand Slam finals ==
=== Doubles (2 runner-ups) ===
Result	Year	Championship	Surface	Partner	Opponents	Score
Loss	1889	Wimbledon	Grass	(United Kingdom) Ernest Lewis	(United Kingdom) Ernest Renshaw (United Kingdom) William Renshaw	4–6, 4–6, 6–3, 6–0, 1–6
Loss	1890	Wimbledon	Grass	(United Kingdom) Ernest Lewis	(United Kingdom) Joshua Pim (United Kingdom) Frank Stoker	0–6, 5–7, 4–6
