= Manliffe Goodbody =

British footballer and tennis player

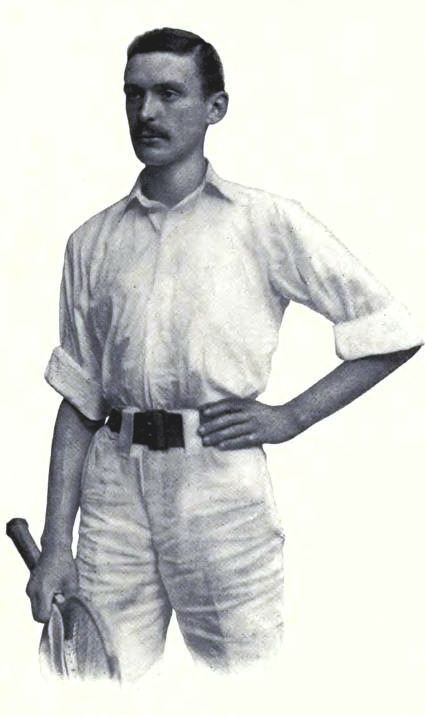
- Goodbody in 1901
- Full name: Manliffe Francis Goodbody
- Country (sports): United Kingdom
- Born: 20 November 1868; Dublin, United Kingdom of Great Britain and Ireland
- Died: 24 March 1916 (aged 47); SS Sussex, English Channel
- Plays: Right-handed (one-handed backhand)

Singles
- Career titles: 15

Grand Slam singles results
- Wimbledon: QF (1889, 1893)
- US Open: F (1894^{Ch})

Doubles

Grand Slam doubles results
- Wimbledon: SF (1893)

Manliffe Francis Goodbody (20 November 1868 – 24 March 1916) was an Irish tennis and football player.

== Career ==
Goodbody was born on 20 November 1868, at Dublin, the son of Marcus Goodbody and Hannah Woodcock Perry. He represented Ireland at football in 1889 and 1891. In 1894 he finished runner-up to defending champion Robert Wrenn at the U.S. National Championships in Newport, having earlier beaten Fred Hovey and William Larned. Goodbody reached the quarter-finals of Wimbledon in 1889 and 1893.

Goodbody was defeated in the final of the 1895 London Championships at Queens Club in London by Harry S. Barlow. He also won the North of Ireland Championships held at the Cliftonville Cricket and Lawn Tennis Club in Belfast three times in 1889, 1890 and 1893.

In 1896 Goodbody won the singles title at the Kent Championships in Beckenham after defeating Harry S. Barlow in the final. The next year he lost the challenge round to George Greville in five sets. In April 1897 he won the French Covered Court Championships in Paris after a straight-sets victory in the final against Frank Riseley.

Goodbody died during the First World War as a passenger aboard SS Sussex that was torpedoed by a German submarine in the English Channel on 24 March 1916. He married in 1904 and was survived by his wife, a son, and a daughter.

== Grand Slam finals ==
=== Singles: 1 (1 runner-up) ===
Result	Year	Championship	Surface	Opponent	Score
Loss	1894	U.S. Championships	Grass	(United States) Robert Wrenn	8–6, 1–6, 4–6, 4–8
