= Ernest George Meers =

English tennis player, organist and gum merchant

Ernest Meers
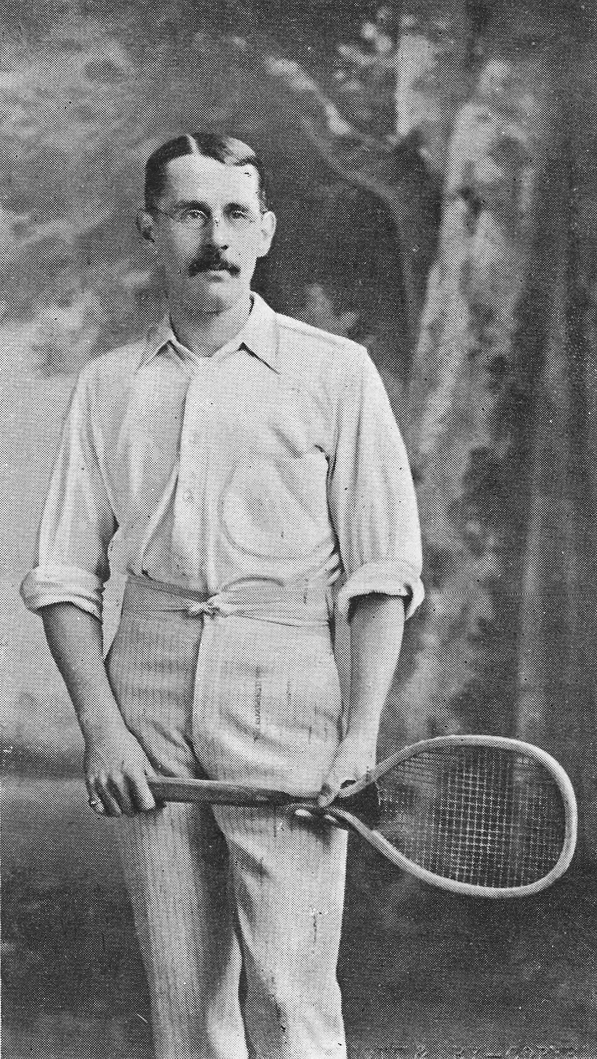
- Meers (before 1903)
- Full name: Ernest George Meers
- Country (sports): United Kingdom
- Born: 1849 Kingsnorth, Kent, England
- Died: 20 August 1928 (aged 79) York, Yorkshire, England
- Turned pro: 1885 (amateur tour)
- Retired: 1895
- Plays: Right-handed (one-handed backhand)

Singles
- Career record: 95-57, (62.5%)
- Career titles: 8

Grand Slam singles results
- Wimbledon: SF (1895)
- US Open: SF (1889)

Grand Slam doubles results
- Wimbledon: F (1888)

Ernest George Meers (1849 – 20 August 1928) was an English tennis player, organist and gum merchant.

== Biography ==
Meers was born in Kingsnorth, near Ashford, Kent. He earned a Bachelor of Music from Queen's College, Oxford and was later chairman and managing director of Watts Ltd, gummakers. He married Eliza Rose, daughter of Captain Henry Douglas-Hart of the Madras Army, who was assassinated while serving in India in 1858. They had three sons and two daughters who survived him.

== Tennis career ==
His played first tournament at the North of England Championships played in Scarborough in 1884 going out in the round of 16. He reached his first tournament final at the Gore Court Championships in Sittingbourne in 1885 losing to Ernest Wool Lewis. Meers played at the Wimbledon Championships between 1890 and 1895, reaching the quarterfinals of the all-comers competition in 1894 and the semifinals in 1895. He reached the semifinals of the U.S. National Championships in 1889 and won the British Covered Court Championships in 1892.

His other singles successes included winning the British Covered Court Championships indoors on hard wood courts in 1891. He won the Kent Championships on grass three times (1888, 1890–91). In addition he also won three titles at the Essex Championships (1887–88, 1890) and the Chingford Open (1888), the Middlesex Championships one time in 1891.

He played his last tournament at the British Covered Court Championships in 1896 going out in the quarter-finals.
