= Joshua Pim =

Irish doctor and tennis player (1869–1942)

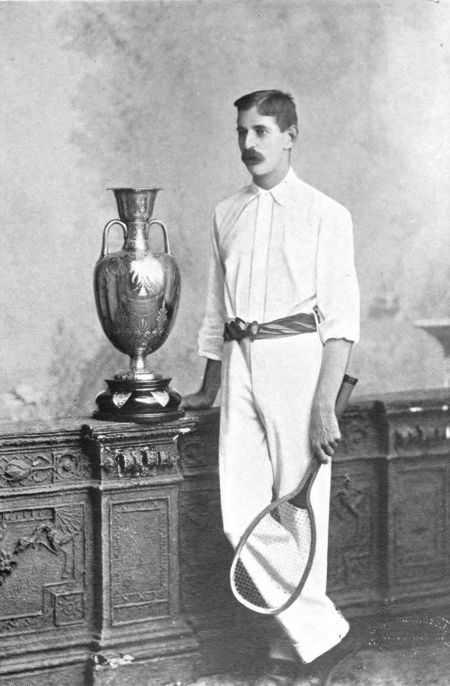
- Full name: Joshua Pim
- Country (sports): United Kingdom of Great Britain and Ireland
- Born: 20 May 1869 Bray, Wicklow, United Kingdom of Great Britain and Ireland
- Died: 15 April 1942 (aged 72) Killiney, Dublin, Ireland
- Turned pro: 1887 (amateur tour)
- Retired: 1902
- Plays: Right-handed (one-handed backhand)

Singles
- Career record: 137–29 (82.53%)
- Career titles: 37

Grand Slam singles results
- Wimbledon: W (1893, 1894)
- US Open: 4R (1902)

Grand Slam doubles results
- Wimbledon: W (1890, 1893)

Dr Joshua Pim FRCSI (20 May 1869 – 15 April 1942) was a medical doctor and Irish amateur tennis player. He won the Wimbledon men's singles title two years in a row, in 1893 and 1894, and was ranked British number one in both those years. He won the Wimbledon men's doubles in 1890 and 1893.

== Family life ==
Joshua Pim was born on 20 May 1869 at 1&2, Millward Terrace, Meath Road, Bray, County Wicklow. His parents were Joshua, a barrister who served in the Royal Tyrone Fusiliers, and Susannah Maria, née Middleton. His father died when the younger Joshua was barely two years old, leaving a widow and five young children.

As a child Pim lived for a while in Crosthwaite Park, Kingstown. In adulthood he moved with his wife Robin (née Lane) to Killiney. They had one son and three daughters. He died at Secrora, his home in Killiney, on 15 April 1942 aged 72, and was survived by his wife and four children. He was a keen swimmer and golfer, and a member of Killiney Golf Club.

== Medical career ==
Pim studied medicine at the Royal College of Surgeons in Ireland and the Royal College of Physicians in London. He graduated at Dublin in 1891 and shortly afterwards obtained appointment as a house surgeon in the city's Jervis Street Hospital. In 1899 he was elected Medical Officer for the Rathdown Workhouse Infirmary (subsequently redesignated as St Columcille's Hospital) at Loughlinstown, and he combined this appointment with general practice for 42 years.

== Tennis career ==
=== Progress and early success ===
Pim played tennis from the age of eleven and in 1888 became a member of Dublin's Lansdowne Club, then known as the All Ireland Lawn Tennis Club. He was coached there by Thomas Burke (father of Albert Burke). Almost immediately after joining the club he won the first prize and challenge cup at its annual tournament, and in May the same year he played his way to the semi-final of the Irish Championship where he met Herbert Lawford, the reigning Wimbledon singles champion. It took five sets for Lawford to prevail over his nineteen-year-old opponent whose good style and easy, cool play attracted considerable notice.

In 1889 Pim won the men's singles competition in the Yorkshire County Championship, a title he would win five times consecutivley. The same year he won the Landsdowne Championships. His first significant tennis triumph came in the following year when he and fellow Lansdowne member Frank Stoker (a relation of the writer Bram Stoker) won the Irish men's doubles championship. Pim then took the men's singles title at the prestigious English Northern Championships and immediately afterwards he and Stoker added the Wimbledon doubles title to their Irish success. In the Wimbledon singles he reached the semi-finals where he was defeated by Willoughby Hamilton from Kildare, who went on to win the championship. At Dublin he had lost the final round of the "all-comers" singles in five sets to Ernest Lewis who, partnered by George Hillyard, was defeated by Pim and Stoker in both the Irish and English doubles finals.

In 1891 Pim and Stoker retained their Irish doubles title but, "badly handicapped" (his right hand crushed and middle finger broken in a motor accident on the eve of the match), Pim lost the Dublin singles final to the defending champion Lewis. Although his finger remained "much swollen and painful" he again won the English Northern Championship, beating Wilfred Baddeley, but at Wimbledon he was defeated by Baddeley in the singles final and, in the doubles final, he and Stoker lost their title to Baddeley and his brother Herbert.

Recovering from typhoid, he was "totally unfit for hard match play" at the 1892 Irish Championship: he was defeated in the semi-finals of the singles competition and he and Stoker lost their doubles title. A month later he prevailed over Harry Barlow to win the English Northern Championship for the third time, but in the Wimbledon singles final he was beaten convincingly by Baddeley and, paired with Harold Mahony, lost the "all comers" phase of the doubles competition to Lewis and Barlow (who defeated the Baddeley brothers in the Challenge final).

=== Dominance of the game ===
In 1893 he captured the Irish singles title for the first time, beating Ernest Renshaw in four sets and, with Stoker, took the Irish doubles title for the third time. For the fourth and fifth consecutive years, respectively, he was the singles victor in the English Northern and Yorkshire County Championships, and he won the men's singles competition (the London Championship) at Queen's Club. Proceeding to Wimbledon, he took the English singles title from Baddeley, in four sets, and, with Stoker, the doubles title from Lewis and Barlow.

He thus became the first player to hold simultaneously the singles and doubles titles of both of what were then the world's premier tennis tournaments. The Bradford Weekly Telegraph reported that the level of play during the Wimbledon match with Baddeley was "in the opinion of those capable of judging ... the best ever seen", while the Newcastle Daily Chronicle also celebrated the circumstance that Pim "has never been known to lose his temper when playing".

In 1894 Pim again won the Irish singles and, with Stoker, the Irish doubles titles. The pair elected not to defend their English doubles title, but in the English singles final Pim again prevailed over Baddeley, this time in straight sets, in a contest of which it was reported that "a finer display was probably never seen on a lawn tennis court". The Dublin Evening Telegraph proclaimed: "The champion of England, Ireland and the world is an Irishman, namely Dr J. Pim."

In 1895 Pim won the singles and (with Stoker) doubles competitions at the Irish championships for the third consecutive year, but afterwards, rather than compete at Wimbledon, he travelled to the United States with Harold Mahony to play against four Americans in an international tournament at Boston. The Roanoke Times welcomed him as "unquestionably the greatest player in the world today". He won his matches against William Larned, Fred Hovey and Malcolm Chace but was overcome by Clarence Hobart. Despite this last upset, Professor William Lyon Phelps later recalled "Pim was so superior to anything we had in America in the nineties that when he came here he was a revelation".

In 1896 Mahony won the singles title at Wimbledon. Pim was meanwhile concentrating on his medical studies and, on passing the final part of his examinations, was admitted a Fellow of the Royal College of Surgeons in Ireland in November that year. He did, however, play for Ireland in the 1896 international tennis match against England, having previously been a member of the Irish team in 1892–94.

In 1902 he was summoned from retirement to be the token Irishman in the British Davis Cup squad to face America. According to the Dictionary of Irish Biography, he was known for the purposes of this trip as "Mr X". The mystery surrounding his identity was not in fact maintained for long, and he was derided for having put on excessive amounts of weight, despite the fact he shed two stone in six weeks. Professor Phelps later observed that "those who saw him play saw only Pim's ghost". He lost his matches against Malcolm Whitman and William Larned, but stayed in America to compete in the men's singles at the 1902 US National Championships, where he reached the fourth round, falling victim to Leo Ware. He did not play competitive tennis thereafter.

=== Game in retrospect ===
Interviewed in 1898, Wilberforce Eaves (who had faced all the leading players of the decade) named Pim as the best opponent against whom he had played, considering that "His game, when at its best, has probably never been equalled." In 1903 Harold Mahony observed "The general opinion of experts would seem to rank Joshua Pim as the finest player the world has ever seen", while Henry Stanley Scrivener (twice a Wimbledon quarter-finalist) concurred that "on his day Pim was the finest player we ever had".

Ernest Meers judged that Pim "seemed to possess more actual genius or natural ability for lawn tennis than anyone I ever met", while Arthur Wallis Myers spoke of his "effortless brilliancy and marvellous versatility". Mahony prefaced a detailed commentary on Pim's style and strengths with the observation that "His game was of the very severe type yet executed with such ease and nonchalance as to give the impression that he was taking no interest whatever in the proceedings".

Half a century later Mahony's tribute to the perfect precision with which Pim could place the ball was recalled when the annual calendar of an American distiller, advertising the aptness of its whiskey to "hit the spot", featured a cartoon image of Pim who could "almost at will hit a tennis ball to land on a shilling in the opposite court".

== Grand Slam finals ==
=== Singles (2 titles, 2 runners-up) ===
Result	Year	Championship	Surface	Opponent	Score
Loss	1891	Wimbledon	Grass	(United Kingdom) Wilfred Baddeley	4–6, 6–1, 5–7, 0–6
Loss	1892	Wimbledon	Grass	(United Kingdom) Wilfred Baddeley	6–4, 3–6, 3–6, 2–6
Win	1893	Wimbledon	Grass	(United Kingdom) Wilfred Baddeley	3–6, 6–1, 6–3, 6–2
Win	1894	Wimbledon	Grass	(United Kingdom) Wilfred Baddeley	10–8, 6–2, 8–6

=== Doubles (2 titles) ===
Result	Year	Championship	Surface	Partner	Opponents	Score
Win	1890	Wimbledon	Grass	(United Kingdom) Frank Stoker	(United Kingdom) George Hillyard (United Kingdom) Ernest Lewis	6–0, 7–5, 6–4
Win	1893	Wimbledon	Grass	(United Kingdom) Frank Stoker	(United Kingdom) Harry Barlow (United Kingdom) Ernest Lewis	4–6, 6–3, 6–1, 2–6, 6–0
