= Ernest Lewis (tennis) =

British lawn tennis player

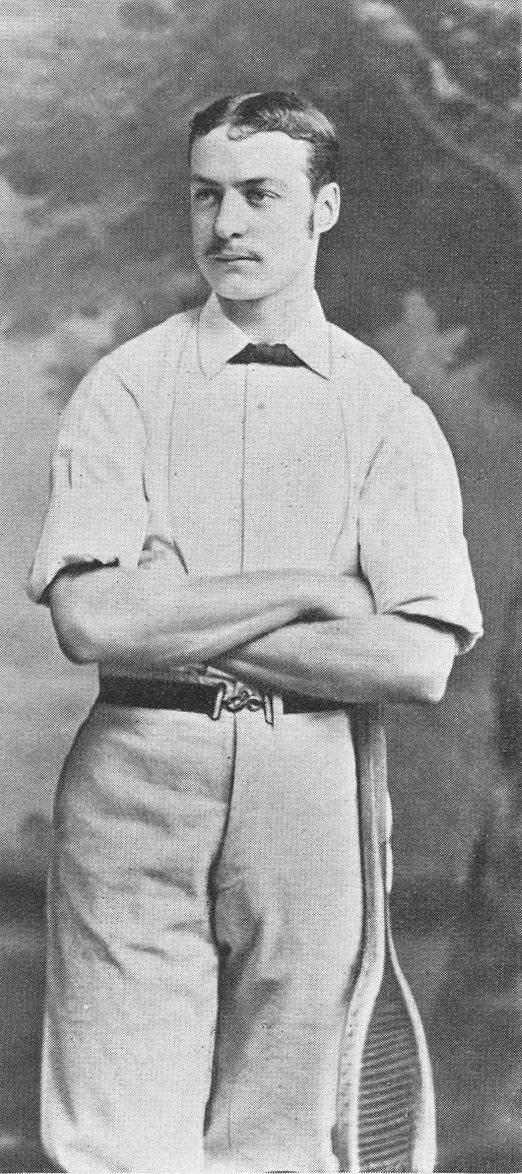
- Full name: Ernest Wool Lewis
- Country (sports): United Kingdom
- Born: 5 April 1867; Hammersmith, Middlesex, England
- Died: 19 April 1930 (aged 63); Plymouth, Devon, England
- Turned pro: 1881 (amateur tour)
- Retired: 1897

Singles
- Career titles: 47

Grand Slam singles results
- Wimbledon: F (1886, 1888, 1892, 1894)

Doubles

Grand Slam doubles results
- Wimbledon: W (1892)

Ernest Wool Lewis (5 April 1867 – 19 April 1930) was a British lawn tennis player who was active at the end of the 19th century. He twice won the Irish Championships in 1890 and 1891, and was a four time losing finalist in singles at the Wimbledon Championships in 1886, 1888, 1892 and 1894. He won the men's doubles championship title in 1892 partnered with Harry S. Barlow.

== Career ==
Ernest Lewis reached the final of the first Wimbledon Championships gentlemen's doubles competition held in 1884. Partnering E.L. Williams they lost the final to the famous tennis brothers Ernest Renshaw and William Renshaw in four sets. With partner George Hillyard he reached and lost the 1889 and 1890 gentlemen's doubles finals.

In 1892 he won his first and only Wimbledon title when together with Harry S. Barlow they defeated another famous team of tennis brothers, Herbert Baddeley and Wilfred Baddeley, in four sets.

In total Lewis would reach seven doubles finals at the Wimbledon Championships during his career (1884,1889, 1890, 1892, 1893, 1894, 1895).

In the gentlemen's singles competition at Wimbledon his best result was reaching the final of the all-comers tournament on four occasions (1886, 1888, 1892 and 1894). In 1886 Lawford beat Ernest Renshaw from 2 sets to 0 down in the quarter-finals before losing the all comers final to Herbert Lawford in five sets. In 1888 he lost the all comers final to Ernest Renshaw in four sets. In 1892 Lewis led 2 sets to 0 against Joshua Pim in the all comers final but lost in five sets. In 1894 he won against Herbert Baddeley in the semifinal in a close five set match but was solidly defeated in the final by Wilfred Baddeley, 0–6, 1–6, 0–6.

Lewis won the singles title at the Irish Championships in 1890 after a close–fought battle in the challenge round against Willoughby Hamilton, 3–6, 3–6, 9–7, 6–4, 7–5. He defended his Irish title in 1891 in a straight sets victory over Irishman Joshua Pim. In 1892 he was victorious at the London Championships at the Queens Club, defeating Joshua Pim in the final.

He won the singles title at the British Covered Court Championships seven times; in 1887, 1888, 1889, 1890, 1891, 1895 and 1896. The first five titles were won when the tournament was played at its original location in Hyde Park, the last two titles were won at the Queen's Club in London. He also won the Middlesex Championships at Chiswick Park four times consecutively from 1887 to 1890, and fifth title again in 1892. His other career singles highlights include winning the Gore Court Championships at Sittingbourne in 1885, the South Saxons Tournament at St Leonards-on-Sea in 1889.

== Grand Slam finals ==
=== Singles (4 runners-up) ===
Result	Year	Championship	Surface	Opponent	Score
Loss	1886	Wimbledon	Grass	(United Kingdom) Herbert Lawford	2–6, 3–6, 6–2, 6–4, 4–6
Loss	1888	Wimbledon	Grass	(United Kingdom) Ernest Renshaw	9–7, 1–6, 6–8, 4–6
Loss	1892	Wimbledon	Grass	(United Kingdom of Great Britain and Ireland) Joshua Pim	6–2, 7–5, 7–9, 3–6, 2–6
Loss	1894	Wimbledon	Grass	(United Kingdom) Wilfred Baddeley	0–6, 1–6, 0–6

=== Doubles (1 title, 6 runners-up) ===
Result	Year	Championship	Surface	Partner	Opponents	Score
Loss	1884	Wimbledon	Grass	(United Kingdom of Great Britain and Ireland) E.L. Williams	(United Kingdom of Great Britain and Ireland) Ernest Renshaw (United Kingdom of Great Britain and Ireland) William Renshaw	3–6, 1–6, 6–1, 4–6
Loss	1889	Wimbledon	Grass	(United Kingdom) George Hillyard	(United Kingdom) Ernest Renshaw (United Kingdom) William Renshaw	4–6, 4 6, 6–3, 6–0, 1–6
Loss	1890	Wimbledon	Grass	(United Kingdom) George Hillyard	(Ireland) Joshua Pim (Ireland) Frank Stoker	0–6, 5–7, 4–6
Win	1892	Wimbledon	Grass	(United Kingdom) Harry Barlow	(United Kingdom) Herbert Baddeley (United Kingdom) Wilfred Baddeley	4–6, 6–2, 8–6, 6–4
Loss	1893	Wimbledon	Grass	(United Kingdom) Harry Barlow	(Ireland) Joshua Pim (Ireland) Frank Stoker	6–4, 3–6, 1–6, 6–2, 0–6
Loss	1894	Wimbledon	Grass	(United Kingdom) Harry Barlow	(United Kingdom) Herbert Baddeley (United Kingdom) Wilfred Baddeley	7–5, 5–7, 6–4, 3–6, 6–8
Loss	1895	Wimbledon	Grass	(United Kingdom) Wilberforce Eaves	(United Kingdom) Herbert Baddeley (United Kingdom) Wilfred Baddeley	6–8, 7–5, 4–6, 3–6
