= Wilfred Baddeley =

British Tennis player (1872-1929)

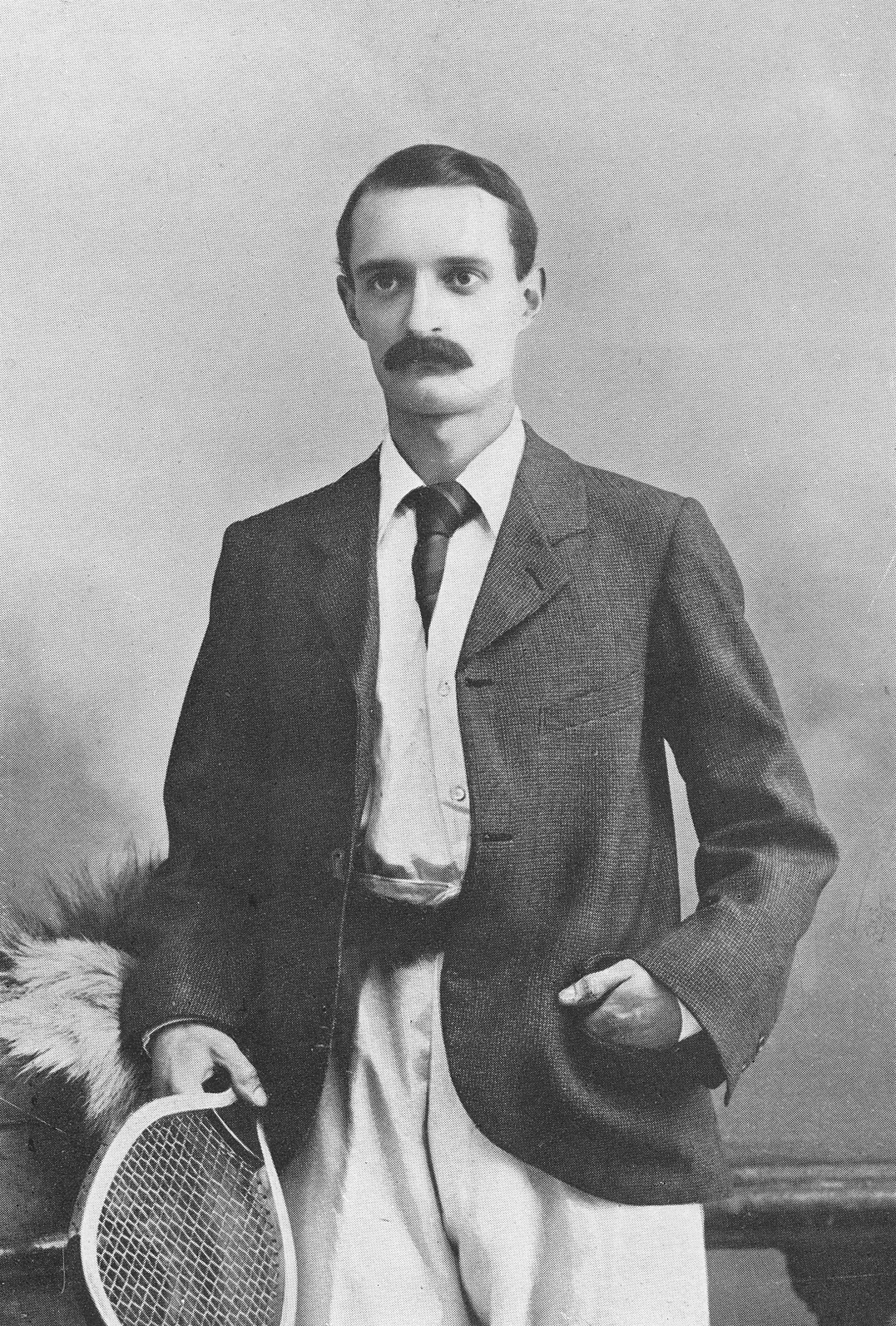
- Country (sports): United Kingdom of Great Britain and Ireland
- Born: 11 January 1872 Bromley, England
- Died: 24 January 1929 (aged 57) Menton, France
- Turned pro: 1887 (amateur tour)
- Retired: 1903
- Plays: Right-handed (one-handed backhand)
- Int. Tennis HoF: 2013 (member page)

Singles
- Career record: 93–23 (80.1%)
- Career titles: 29
- Highest ranking: No. 1 (1891, ITHF)

Grand Slam singles results
- Wimbledon: W (1891, 1892, 1895)

Doubles

Grand Slam doubles results
- Wimbledon: W (1891, 1894, 1895, 1896)

Wilfred Baddeley (11 January 1872 – 24 January 1929) was a British male tennis player and the elder of the Baddeley twins.

== Career ==
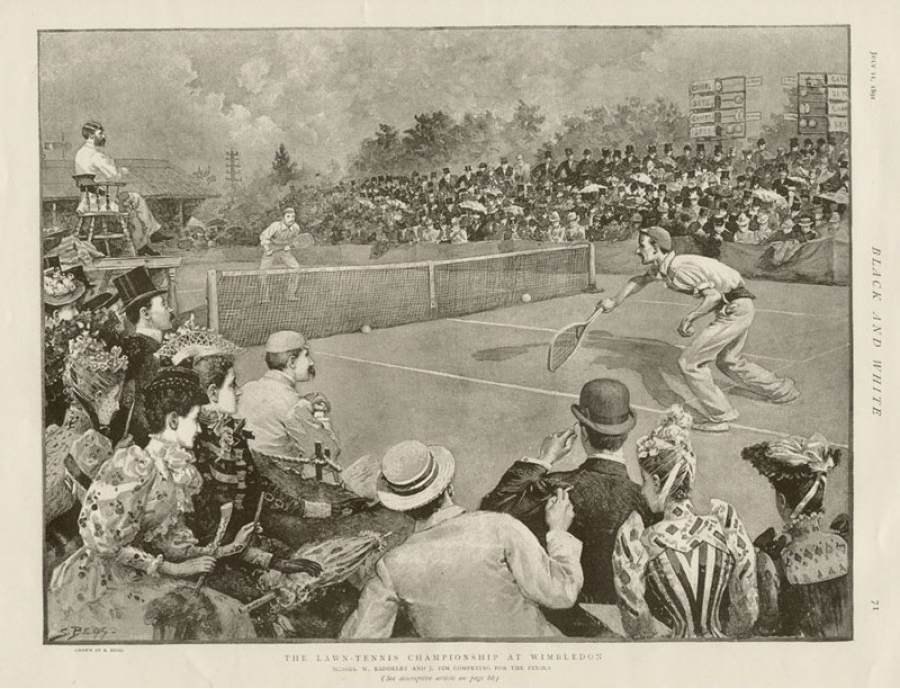
The Lawn Tennis Championship at Wimbledon 1891, Messrs Baddeley and Pim competing for the Finals

Wilfred, the better-known competitor, made his debut at Wimbledon in 1889 and he went on to win singles title three times in 1891, 1892 and 1895. His 6–4, 1–6, 7–5, 6–0 win over Joshua Pim in 1891 at the age of 19 years and five months made him, until Boris Becker in 1985, the youngest men's singles champion at Wimbledon. He was also runner-up in 1893, 1894 and 1896. With Herbert, he won four doubles championships at Wimbledon in 1891, 1894 – 1896. The twins retired from competitive lawn tennis after the 1897 Wimbledon Championships to pursue their law careers but made a reappearance in the doubles event at Wimbledon in 1904 and 1905. In total he participated in eight Wimbledon singles tournaments and eleven doubles tournaments between 1889 and 1905.

Baddeley was inducted into the International Tennis Hall of Fame in 2013.

== Professional life ==
In February 1895 the brothers qualified in London as solicitors. They joined their uncle and father Thomas and E. P. Baddeley in Leadenhall Street at the family firm, founded by their great-grandfather in 1790. The brothers remained partners in the firm until 1919, when they retired leaving their cousin, Cyril Baddeley, to carry on in the family name.

== Grand Slam finals ==
=== Singles: 6 (3 titles, 3 runners-up) ===
Result	Year	Championship	Surface	Opponent	Score
Win	1891	Wimbledon	Grass	(United Kingdom of Great Britain and Ireland) Joshua Pim	6–4, 1–6, 7–5, 6–0
Win	1892	Wimbledon	Grass	(United Kingdom of Great Britain and Ireland) Joshua Pim	4–6, 6–3, 6–3, 6–2
Loss	1893	Wimbledon	Grass	(United Kingdom of Great Britain and Ireland) Joshua Pim	6–3, 1–6, 3–6, 2–6
Loss	1894	Wimbledon	Grass	(United Kingdom of Great Britain and Ireland) Joshua Pim	8–10, 2–6, 6–8
Win	1895	Wimbledon	Grass	(United Kingdom) W. V. Eaves	4–6, 2–6, 8–6, 6–2, 6–3
Loss	1896	Wimbledon	Grass	(United Kingdom) Harold Mahony	2–6, 8–6, 7–5, 6–8, 3–6

=== Doubles: 6 (4 titles, 2 runner-ups) ===
Result	Year	Championship	Surface	Partner	Opponents	Score
Win	1891	Wimbledon	Grass	(United Kingdom) Herbert Baddeley	(United Kingdom) Joshua Pim (United Kingdom) Frank Stoker	6–1, 6–3, 1–6, 6–2
Loss	1892	Wimbledon	Gras	(United Kingdom) Herbert Baddeley	(United Kingdom) Ernest Lewis (United Kingdom) Harold Barlow	6–4, 2–6, 6–8, 4–6
Win	1894	Wimbledon	Grass	(United Kingdom) Herbert Baddeley	(United Kingdom) Harold Barlow (United Kingdom) Ernest Lewis	5–7, 7–5, 4–6, 6–3, 8–6
Win	1895	Wimbledon	Grass	(United Kingdom) Herbert Baddeley	(United Kingdom) Ernest Lewis (United Kingdom) Herbert Wilberforce	8–6, 5–7, 6–4, 6–3
Win	1896	Wimbledon	Grass	(United Kingdom) Herbert Baddeley	(United Kingdom) Reginald Doherty (United Kingdom) Harold Nisbet	1–6, 3–6, 6–4, 6–2, 6–1
Loss	1897	Wimbledon	Grass	(United Kingdom) Herbert Baddeley	(United Kingdom) Reginald Doherty (United Kingdom) Laurence Doherty	4–6, 6–4, 6–8, 4–6
