= Frank Stoker =

Irish Tennis and Ireland international rugby union player

Frank Stoker FRCSI
- Born: Francis Owen Stoker; 29 May 1867; Dublin, Ireland
- Died: 8 January 1939 (aged 71); St Vincent's University Hospital, St Stephen's Green Dublin, Ireland
- Education: Royal College of Surgeons of Ireland
- Occupations: Surgeon dentist; tennis player; rugby player
- Spouse: Margaret Stoker (m. 1899)
- Children: 5 including, Norma Stoker
- Relatives: Henry Hugh Gordon Stoker (nephew)
- Medical career
- Profession: Physician; surgeon; dentist
- Country (sports): Ireland

Grand Slam singles results
- Wimbledon: 2R (1893)

Grand Slam doubles results
- Wimbledon: W (1890, 1893)

Rugby union career
- Position: Forward
Amateur team(s)
Years	Team	Apps	(Points)
- Wanderers F.C.
International career
Years	Team	Apps	(Points)
1886–1891	Ireland	5	(0)

Tennis career

Francis Owen Stoker FRCSI (29 May 1867 – 8 January 1939), known as Frank Stoker, was an Irish surgeon dentist, tennis and rugby player. Together with Joshua Pim, Stoker won the Wimbledon Championships Men's Doubles in 1890 and 1893, and is the only rugby international to have been a Wimbledon champion.

== Early life ==
Francis Owen Stoker was born on 29 May 1867 in Dublin to Edward Alexander Stoker FRCSI (1810–1889), a surgeon and anatomist, and Henrietta Stoker (née Wisdom).

Stoker's paternal grandfather, William J. Stoker FRCSI (1773–1843) was a prominent epidemiologist at Cork Street Fever Hospital.

Stoker was distantly related to Sir Thornley Stoker, a medical writer, anatomist and surgeon, and the writer, barrister, and theatre manager Bram Stoker.

== Career ==
=== Medical career ===
Stoker was licensed to practice medicine and surgery by the Irish Royal College in August 1892 but, wishing to specialise in dentistry, obtained a place at the recently established Dental School of Guy's Hospital in 1893.

After obtaining his dental degree in 1894, Stoker returned to Dublin and practised at 23 Westland Row.

=== Rugby career ===
Frank Stoker was a member of the Second XV of Dublin's Wanderers F.C. from 1883 onward. He played for Irish Schools at their annual meeting with English Schools in 1885, and for Dublin United Hospitals in the following year when a student at Jervis Street Hospital. He was in Wanderers' First XV by the beginning of 1886, was second in the club’s drop-kick contest shortly afterwards (kicking an average of 44 yards with both feet), and was elected its captain for the following season.

He played in the Irish international team that met Scotland in 1886 and again (in what was described as "the best match ever played in Scotland") in 1888. He was named as a reserve for his country's match against England in 1887, played for Ireland against both Wales and the New Zealand touring side in 1888, and appeared once more against Scotland in 1889. His brother Ernest Stoker, also of Wanderers F.C., represented Ireland alongside him in the 1888 games against Scotland and Wales; both men played as forwards.

While studying in London in 1893–94 Frank played for Guy's Hospital and Blackheath F.C., scoring a try in the latter's match with Hartlepool Rovers. He was President of Wanderers F.C. in 1899–1900.

=== Tennis career ===
Frank and Ernest Stoker, playing as a pair, figured in Irish tennis tournaments of the mid-1880s and in 1886 were successful in a doubles semi-final at the Greystones Tournament in Bray, County Wicklow. The last set of that match was "entirely won by the place-volleying and smashing of Frank Stoker who scarcely allowed a ball to pass him at the net", but the pair were outplayed in the final.

Frank subsequently found a new doubles partner in Joshua Pim, a fellow member of Dublin's Lansdowne Club, and the pair began to compete in the annual Irish Championships at Fitzwilliam Square. They were Irish national doubles champions on five occasions between 1890 and 1895 and, bringing their talent to England, took the Northern Championships title in 1890, 1892, 1893 and 1894 and the All England title at Wimbledon in 1890 and 1893.

By June 1891 the tennis pairing of Pim and Stoker "had been pronounced the finest combination the world had ever seen". This accolade was promptly followed by the pair's temporary loss of their Northern and Wimbledon titles, but they had returned to dominance by 1893.

In 1894, shortly before their victory in the Northern Championships, Stoker was admitted a Licentiate in Dental Surgery by the Royal College of Surgeons in Ireland. Aged 27, he was anxious to commence practice as a dentist without further delay and he elected not to defend his Wimbledon title. After he retained his Irish title in 1895 his tennis career largely came to an end, although in 1896 (as in 1893 and 1894) he represented Ireland against England in both the singles and doubles matches of the international fixture.

Stoker's tennis reputation has been somewhat overshadowed by Pim's additional successes in the singles format of the game, but his own strengths in that format were regularly demonstrated. He was a winner of the County Dublin Championships and the Fitzwilliam Purse, was runner-up in many singles tournaments (including when defeated by Pim in the 1891 Northern contest), and during the whole of 1892 was the only player to win a match against the reigning Wimbledon champion, Wilfred Baddeley. His form in 1894 was such that, among Irish players, only Pim and Tom Chaytor were regarded as his equals, it being observed that "His tremendous service, his hard driving and accurate placing both fore and backhand would alone make him a dangerous opponent for the most skilful players, but with these good points he combines volleying of a high order, and quickness which is quite remarkable in a man of his size". He was 6'1½" in height and over 13 stone in weight.

=== Amateur golf career ===
Stoker played golf for the Portmarnock and Royal Dublin clubs and competed, unsuccessfully, in the Irish Amateur Open Championship in 1907.

== Personal life ==
In 1899, Stoker married Margaret 'Rita' Stoker (née Maunsell; 1867–1943). Stoker belonged to the Church of Ireland whilst Rita Stoker belonged to the Roman Catholic Church. Together they had five children, of which 4 survived to adulthood. Stoker's daughter Norma Stoker was a sportswoman who won internationally in tennis, badminton, hockey, golf and croquet.

On 8 January 1939, Stoker died at St Vincent's University Hospital, St Stephen's Green, Dublin aged 71.

== Grand Slam finals ==
=== Doubles (2 titles) ===
Result	Year	Championship	Surface	Partner	Opponents	Score
Win	1890	Wimbledon	Grass	(United Kingdom) Joshua Pim	(United Kingdom) George Hillyard (United Kingdom) Ernest Lewis	6–0, 7–5, 6–4
Win	1893	Wimbledon	Grass	(United Kingdom) Joshua Pim	(United Kingdom) Harry Barlow (United Kingdom) Ernest Lewis	4–6, 6–3, 6–1, 2–6, 6–0

== See also ==
- James Cecil Parke
