= Herbert Baddeley =

British male tennis player (1872–1931)

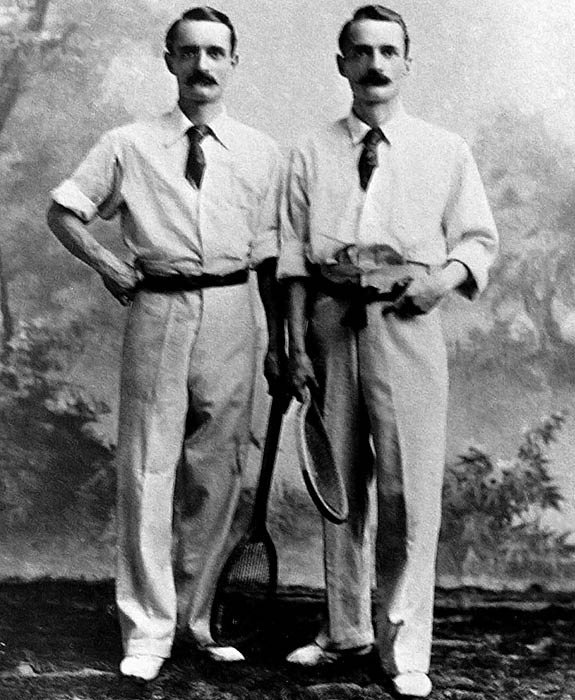
- Herbert Baddeley (left) with twin brother Wilfred Baddeley (right)
- Country (sports): United Kingdom of Great Britain and Ireland
- Born: 11 January 1872 Bromley, England
- Died: 20 July 1931 (aged 59) Cannes, France
- Turned pro: 1887 (amateur tour)
- Retired: 1897

Grand Slam singles results
- Wimbledon: SF (1894, 1895, 1896)

Grand Slam doubles results
- Wimbledon: W (1891, 1894, 1895, 1896)

Herbert Baddeley (11 January 1872 – 20 July 1931) was a British male tennis player and the younger of the Baddeley twins.

Herbert reached the singles semi finals at Wimbledon three times. In 1894 he beat Harry S. Barlow before losing to Ernest Lewis. In 1895 he beat Reginald Doherty before handing a walkover to his brother. In 1896 he beat William Larned before losing to Wilberforce Eaves. In 1891 and 1894–1896 he and his twin brother Wilfred won the Wimbledon doubles championship four times. When Wilfred was beaten in the 1896 singles Challenge Round by Harold Mahony, they both retired from lawn tennis to concentrate on their law career.

In February 1895 the brothers qualified in London as solicitors. They joined their uncle and father Thomas and E. P. Baddeley in Leadenhall Street at the family firm, founded by their great-grandfather in 1790. The brothers remained partners in the firm until 1919, when they retired leaving their cousin, Cyril Baddeley, to carry on in the family name. His daughter Violet Baddeley twice reached the final of the All England Open Badminton Championships in 1922 and 1927.

== Grand Slam finals ==
=== Doubles (4 titles, 2 runner-ups) ===
| Result | Year | Championship | Surface | Partner | Opponents | Score |
|---|---|---|---|---|---|---|
| Win | 1891 | Wimbledon | Grass | (United Kingdom) Wilfred Baddeley | (United Kingdom) Joshua Pim (United Kingdom) Frank Stoker | 6–1, 6–3, 1–6, 6–2 |
| Loss | 1892 | Wimbledon | Grass | (United Kingdom) Wilfred Baddeley | (United Kingdom) Ernest Lewis (United Kingdom) Harry S. Barlow | 6–4, 2–6, 6–8, 4–6 |
| Win | 1894 | Wimbledon | Grass | (United Kingdom) Wilfred Baddeley | (United Kingdom) Harry S. Barlow (United Kingdom) Charles Martin | 5–7, 7–5, 4–6, 6–3, 8–6 |
| Win | 1895 | Wimbledon | Grass | (United Kingdom) Wilfred Baddeley | (United Kingdom) Ernest Lewis (United Kingdom) Herbert Wilberforce | 8–6, 5–7, 6–4, 6–3 |
| Win | 1896 | Wimbledon | Grass | (United Kingdom) Wilfred Baddeley | (United Kingdom) Reginald Doherty (United Kingdom) Harold Nisbet | 1–6, 3–6, 6–4, 6–2, 6–1 |
| Loss | 1897 | Wimbledon | Grass | (United Kingdom) Wilfred Baddeley | (United Kingdom) Reginald Doherty (United Kingdom) Laurence Doherty | 4–6, 6–4, 6–8, 4–6 |
