= Wilberforce Eaves =

English tennis player

Wilberforce Eaves MBE
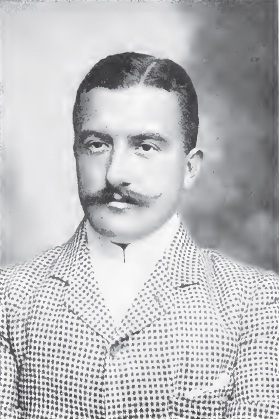
- Full name: Wilberforce Vaughan Eaves
- Country (sports): Great Britain
- Born: 10 December 1867 Melbourne, VIC, Australia
- Died: 10 February 1920 (aged 52) London, England
- Plays: Right-handed (one-handed backhand)

Singles
- Career record: 341–96 (78.3%)
- Career titles: 39

Grand Slam singles results
- Wimbledon: F (1895^{AC}, 1896^{AC}, 1897^{AC})
- US Open: F (1897^{Ch})
Medal record
Representing United Kingdom
Olympic Games
Bronze medal – third place	1908 London	Singles

Wilberforce Vaughan Eaves MBE (10 December 1867 – 10 February 1920) was an Australian-born tennis player from the United Kingdom. At the 1908 London Olympics he won a bronze medal in the Men's Singles tournament.

== Biography ==
Eaves was born in Melbourne, Australia, son of William and Eunice Eaves of St Kilda, Victoria.

He reached the Men's Singles All-Comers' final at the Wimbledon Championships in 1895 and lost against Wilfred Baddeley despite having had a match point in the third set. In 1897, he became the first non-American to reach the final in the U.S. National Singles Championships. He lost the final in five sets to American Robert Wrenn. He was particularly successful on clay courts at the Dinard International tournament in Brittany, France organized by the Dinard Lawn Tennis Club where he won that title ten times between (1894-1896) and (1902-1909).

Eaves won the Welsh Championships in 1895 and the Irish Championships in 1897, defeating Wilfred Baddeley in a five-set final. He became the Scottish singles champion in 1901 and won the British Covered Court Championships, played on wooden courts at Queen's Club in London three consecutive times from 1897 until 1899. He won against seven-time tournament champion Ernest Lewis and Wimbledon champions Laurence Doherty and Harold Mahony in the respective finals.

Qualified as a doctor of medicine, he served as a civil surgeon in the Boer War, and took a temporary commission in the Royal Army Medical Corps in the first week of World War I, on 10 August 1914, being promoted to Captain after a year's service. He was later awarded a MBE for his services and died in London, where he is buried in Greenwich Cemetery.

== Grand Slam finals ==
=== Singles (1 runner-up) ===
Result	Year	Championship	Surface	Opponent	Score
Loss	1897	U.S. Championships	Grass	(United States) Robert Wrenn	6–4, 6–8, 3–6, 6–2, 2–6

== See also ==
- World number one male tennis player rankings
