= Harry S. Barlow =

British amateur lawn tennis player (1860–1917)

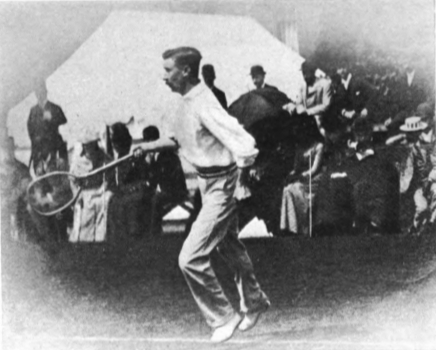
- Full name: Harold Sibthorpe Barlow
- Country (sports): United Kingdom
- Born: 5 April 1860; Hammersmith, London
- Died: 16 July 1917 (aged 57); Kennington, London
- Turned pro: 1883 (amateur tour)
- Retired: 1900

Singles
- Career record: 387/101 (73.9%)
- Career titles: 32

Grand Slam singles results
- Wimbledon: F (1889^{AC}, 1890^{AC})

Doubles

Grand Slam doubles results
- Wimbledon: W (1892)

Harry Sibthorpe Barlow (5 April 1860 – 16 July 1917) was a British amateur lawn tennis player, active at the end of the 19th century.

== Career ==
In 1892, he won his first and only Wimbledon title when together with Ernest Lewis they defeated another famous team of tennis brothers, Herbert Baddeley and Wilfred Baddeley, in four sets.

In total Barlow would reach three doubles finals at the Wimbledon Championships during his career (1892, 1893, 1894).

At the 1889 Wimbledon Championships, Barlow beat Willoughby Hamilton in five sets in the semifinals. William Renshaw defeated Barlow 3–6, 5–7, 8–6, 10–8, 8–6 in the All Comers Final, and then defeated his brother and reigning champion Ernest Renshaw 6–4, 6–1, 3–6, 6–0 in the Challenge Round to win the 1889 Wimbledon Championships. Renshaw survived a total of six match points in the All Comers Final against Barlow at 2–5 and 6–7 in the fourth set. He reached the All Comers Final again the following year, losing to Willoughby Hamilton in the 1890 Wimbledon Championships, who then defeated reigning champion Renshaw in the Challenge Round.

His career singles title highlights include winning the Queen's Club Championships, three times, Kent Championships three times, West of England Championships three times, the North of England Championships two times (1891–1893), the South of England Championships two times, Surrey Championships two times, and the Welsh Championships, twice, the London Championships (1890–1891) and the Surrey Closed County Championship (1890) one time.

== Grand Slam finals ==
=== Doubles (1 title, 2 runners-up) ===
| Result | Year | Championship | Surface | Partner | Opponents | Score |
|---|---|---|---|---|---|---|
| Win | 1892 | Wimbledon | Gras | (United Kingdom) Ernest Lewis | (United Kingdom) Herbert Baddeley (United Kingdom) Wilfred Baddeley | 4–6, 6–2, 8–6, 6–4 |
| Loss | 1893 | Wimbledon | Grass | (United Kingdom) Ernest Lewis | (United Kingdom of Great Britain and Ireland) Joshua Pim (United Kingdom of Great Britain and Ireland) Frank Stoker | 6–4, 3–6, 1–6, 6–2, 0–6 |
| Loss | 1894 | Wimbledon | Grass | (United Kingdom) C. H. Martin | (United Kingdom) Herbert Baddeley (United Kingdom) Wilfred Baddeley | 7–5, 5–7, 6–4, 3–6, 6–8 |
