= 1894 women's tennis season =

Women's tennis tournament series

1894 Women's Tennis Season
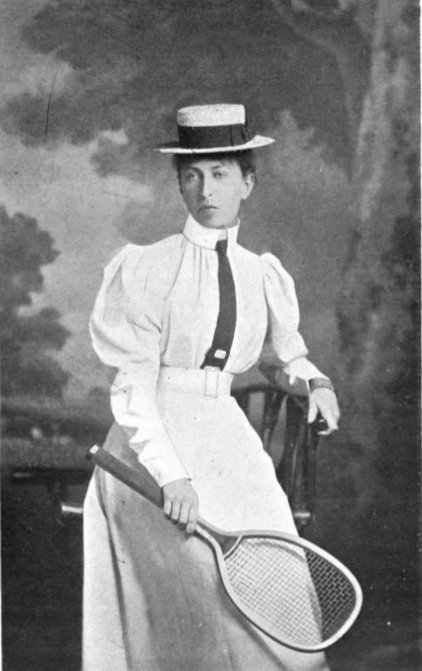
- Blanche Hillyard is season leader she wins 6 events including 3 major tournaments, the Irish, Northern and Wimbledon Championships

Details
- Duration: 2 January – 28 December
- Edition: 19th
- Tournaments: 83
- Categories: Africa (2); Asia (1); Australasia (11); Europe (51); North America (18); South America (0)

Achievements (singles)
- Most titles: (United Kingdom) Blanche Hillyard (6)
- Most finals: (United Kingdom) Blanche Hillyard (7)

The 1894 Women's Tennis Season was a worldwide tennis circuit composed of 83 major, national, regional, provincial, state, county, metropolitan, city and regular tournaments.

The season began on 2 January 1894 in Cape Town, South Africa and ended on 28 December in Christchurch, New Zealand.

It was the 19th season since women's tennis began.

== Season summary ==
The 1894 women's tennis season began on 2 January in Cape Town, South Africa with the Western Province Championships played on clay courts the event is won by Mrs F.S. Green.

At the end of May the first major tournament of the season the Irish Lawn Tennis Championships are held at the Fitzwilliam Club, Dublin, Ireland with Englands Blanche Hillyard emerges victorius in the women's singles event.

In mid June the second major event of the season the Northern Championships are played at the Liverpool Cricket Club grounds, the holder Lottie Dod chooses not to defend her Northern title this leaving Blanche Hillyard to win a second major title by defeating Beatrice Draffen in the all comers final in three sets.

Moving across the Atlantic Ocean to Philadelphia in the United States the third major tournament of the season U.S. National Championships conclude on 16 June, the women's singles title is won by Helen Hellwig needing five sets to overcome Aline Terry.

In the middle of July at the fourth and final major tournament of the season the Wimbledon Championships are brought to a conclusion, Englands Lottie Dod does not to defend her title, leaving Blanche Hillyard to defeat Welsh player Edith Austin in straight sets in the all comers final, Hillyard completes a clean sweep of the three home major events.

The 1894 season is brought to a close on 28 December with the New Zealand Championships that are played in Christchurch, the women's singles event is won by K Hilda Hitchings.

== Season results ==
Notes:Hard includes asphalt, cement and concrete tennis courts, some European tournaments use the term to define clay courts they are shown as clay.

Key

Tournaments
Major
National
Professional
Worldwide
Team

Surface
Canvas – Indoor (0)
Clay – Outdoor (20)
Clay – Indoor (0)
Grass – Outdoor (54)
Hard – Outdoor (6)
Wood – Indoor (3)

=== January ===
Ended	Tournament	Winner	Finalist	Semifinalist	Quarterfinalist
6 Jan.	Western Province Championships; Cape Town, South Africa; Clay	(Cape Colony) Mrs F.S. Green def.	(Cape Colony) Miss L A. Butler		

=== February ===
Ended	Tournament	Winner	Finalist	Semifinalist	Quarterfinalist
24 Feb.	Lyttleton Ladies Tournament; Lyttleton, Australia; Grass	(Australia) Mrs Chambers def.	(Australia) G. Hildyard		

=== March ===
Ended	Tournament	Winner	Finalist	Semifinalist	Quarterfinalist
4 Mar.	Ceylon Championships; Nuwara Eliya, Ceylon; Clay	(Dominion of Ceylon) Mrs A. F. Brown; 6-3, 6-2	(Dominion of Ceylon) Annette de Fonblanque		
7 Mar.	Auckland Championships; Auckland, New Zealand; Grass	(New Zealand) Jane Mowbry; 6-4, 6-4	(New Zealand) Mary Spiers		
19 Mar.	Singapore LLTC Spring Open; Singapore, Straits Settlements; Grass	(Straits Settlements) Mrs Lovell; 1-6, 6-4, 6-4	(Straits Settlements) Mrs Wadell		
22 Mar.	South African Championships; Port Elizabeth, South Africa; Clay	(South Africa) Mabel Grant; 6-1, 6-0	(South Africa) Beatrice Grant		
24 Mar.	Otago LTA Tournament; Dunedin, New Zealand; Grass	(New Zealand) Ms Mackerras; 9-0 games	(New Zealand) N. Callender		
26 Mar.	Goulburn Open; Goulburn, Australia; Grass	(Australia) S. Dransfield; 6-1, 6-3	(Australia) M. Freeman		
26 Mar.	Geelong Easter Tournament; Geelong, Australia; Hard	(Australia) Ms Robertson; 6-2, 6-1	(Australia) Ms Spence		
27 Mar.	Tasmanian Championships; Hobart, Australia; Grass	(Australia) Nina Rock; 6-0, 6-3	(Australia) Gertrude Swan		

=== April ===
Ended	Tournament	Winner	Finalist	Semifinalist	Quarterfinalist
7 Apr.	British Covered Court Championships; West Kensington, Great Britain; Wood (i)	(Wales) Edith Austin; 2-6 6-4 7-5	(United Kingdom) May Arbuthnot		
9 Apr.	Ladie's South Australian Championships; Adelaide, Australia; Hard	(Australia) Maisie Parr; 6-0, 6-2	(Australia) W. Brown		
14 Apr.	Montreux International; Montreux, Switzerland; Clay	(United Kingdom) Mildred Brooksmith def. ?	(Ireland) Ruth Dyas		
17 Apr.	Roman Open Tournament; Rome, Italy; Clay	(United Kingdom) Mabel Barff def.	(Italy) Maria della Somaglia		
21 Apr.	Welsh Covered Court Championships; Llandudno, Great Britain; Wood (i)	(United Kingdom) Alice Pickering; 6-3, 6-3	(United Kingdom) Margaret Dickens		

=== May ===
Ended	Tournament	Winner	Finalist	Semifinalist	Quarterfinalist
19 May.	New South Wales Championships; Sydney, Australia; Grass	(Australia) S. Dransfield (2) default.	(Australia) Ellen Mayne		
19 May.	Tynedale Open; Hexham, Great Britain; Grass	(United Kingdom) Helen Jackson; 6-3, 6-2	(Scotland) Lottie Paterson		
26 May.	Irish Championships; Fitzwilliam LTC; Dublin, Ireland; Grass	(United Kingdom) Blanche Hillyard; 6-3, 6-2	(United Kingdom) Miss Shaw		

=== June ===
Ended	Tournament	Winner	Finalist	Semifinalist	Quarterfinalist
1 Jun.	Prater Public Park Tournament; Vienna, Austria; Clay	(Austria-Hungary) Countess Metternich def	(Austria-Hungary) Princess Auersperg		
3 Jun.	Lansdowne Championships; Dublin II, Ireland; Grass	(United Kingdom) Miss Shaw; 6-2, 6-4	(United Kingdom) Florence Snook		
8 Jun.	North of Ireland Championships; Belfast, Ireland; Grass	(Ireland) R. Shaw; 6-1, 6-1	(United Kingdom) Florence Carr		
9 Jun.	Middlesex Championships; Chiswick Park, Great Britain; Grass	(Wales) Edith Austin (2); 6-3, 6-3	(United Kingdom) Alice Brown		
13 Jun.	Leicester Open; Leicester, Great Britain; Grass	(United Kingdom) Blanche Hillyard (2); 6-3, 6-1	(United Kingdom) Helen Jackson		
16 Jun.	Northern Championships; Liverpool, Great Britain; Grass	(United Kingdom) Blanche Hillyard (3); 7-5, 4-6, 6-3	(United Kingdom) Beatrice Draffen		
16 Jun.	Kent County Championships; Blackheath, Great Britain; Grass	(United Kingdom) Amy Wilson default	(United Kingdom) Georgina Wilson		
16 Jun.	U.S. National Championships; Philadelphia, United States; Grass	(United States) Helen Hellwig; 7-5, 3-6, 6-0, 3-6, 6-3	(United States) Aline Terry		
23 Jun.	Hudson River Championships; Yonkers, United States; Clay	(United States) Augusta Bradley; 3-6, 8-10, 6-4, 7-5, 6-1	(United States) Mabel L. Ferris		
23 Jun.	Kent Championships; Beckenham, Great Britain; Grass	(Wales) Edith Austin (3); 6-4, 6-2	(United Kingdom) Amy Wilson		
24 Jun.	Gainsborough Championships; Gainsborough, Great Britain; Grass	(United Kingdom) Agatha Templeman; 6-0, 10-8	(United Kingdom) Elizabeth White		
25 Jun.	Westside TC Open; New York City, United States; Clay	(United States) Juliette Atkinson; 6-0, 6-1, 6-3	(United States) Agnes Collard		
30 Jun.	London Championships; West Kensignton II, Great Britain; Grass	(Wales) Edith Austin (4); 8-6 11-9	(United Kingdom) Charlotte Cooper		

=== July ===
Ended	Tournament	Winner	Finalist	Semifinalist	Quarterfinalist
2 Jul.	Middle States Championships; Montrose, United States; Grass	(United States) Juliette Atkinson (2); 6-8, 6-4, 7-5, 8-10, 6-3	(United States) Helen Hellwig		
5 Jul.	Welsh Championships; Penarth, Great Britain; Grass	(United Kingdom) Helen Jackson (2); 8-6, 6-2	(United Kingdom) Ethel Cochrane		
7 Jul.	Gipsy Championships; Stamford Hill, Great Britain; Grass	(United Kingdom) Amy Wilson (2); 6-1, 3-6, 7-5	(United Kingdom) C. Reade		
7 Jul.	Canadian Championships; Ottowa,Canada; Grass	(Canada) Maude D. Osborne; 3-6, 6-2, 6-1	(Canada) Mrs Whitehead		
14 Jul.	Natal Championships; Pietermaritzburg, South Africa; Clay	(Colony of Natal) Norah Hickman; 6-4, 6-1	(Colony of Natal) Miss Forder		
14 Jul.	Sheffield & Hallamshire Tournament; Sheffield, Great Britain; Grass	(United Kingdom) Jane Corder	(United Kingdom) Florence Thompson		
15 Jul.	Hungarian National Championships (Note: The Hunarian National Championships was an open gender event); Balatonfüred, Hungary; Clay	(Austria-Hungary) Paulina Von Pálffy (f); 6-4, 11-9	(Hungary) Károly Demény (m)		
18 Jul.	Wimbledon Championships; Wimbledon, Great Britain; Grass	(United Kingdom) Blanche Hillyard (4); 6-1, 6-1	(Wales) Edith Austin		
25 Jul.	Warwickshire Championships; Leamington Spa, Great Britain; Grass	(United Kingdom) Lucy Kendal; 6-4, 6-4	(United Kingdom) Agatha Templeman		
28 Jul	Nottinghamshire Open; Nottingham, Great Britain; Grass	(United Kingdom) Kate Nunneley; 6-1, 6-0	(United Kingdom) Helen Jackson		
28 Jul	Nottingham Ladies Challenge Cup; Nottingham II, Great Britain; Grass	(United Kingdom) Kate Nunneley (2); 6-3, 6-4	(United Kingdom) Blanche Hillyard		
28 Jul.	Scottish Championships; Wemyss Bay, Great Britain; Grass	(Scotland) Lottie Paterson walkover	(United Kingdom) Jane Corder		
28 Jul.	West of Scotland Championships (Note: The Wemyss Bay Meeting played at the Inverkip Rovers LTC included two events, the Scottish Championships and West of Scotland Championships); Wemyss Bay, Great Britain; Grass	(Scotland) Lottie Paterson (2); 6-2, 6-0	(Scotland) Heather Graham		
29 Jul.	Netherlands National Championships; Scheveningen, Netherlands; Clay	(Netherlands) Mej P. Scherius; 2-1 sets	(Netherlands) I. Matthes		

=== August ===
Ended	Tournament	Winner	Finalist	Semifinalist	Quarterfinalist
4 Aug.	Queensland Championships; Brisbane, Australia; Grass	(Australia) Amy Pugh; 6-2, 6-3	(Australia) Mabel Taylor		
4 Aug.	Northumberland Championships; Newcasle, Great Britain; Grass	(United Kingdom) Helen Jackson (3); 6-3, 9-7	(United Kingdom) Blanche Hillyard		
4 Aug.	Trefriw Open; Trefriw, Great Britain; Grass	(United Kingdom) Miss Smith; 6-1, 6-4	(Ireland) Ruth Dyas		
10 Aug.	Exmouth Open; Exmouth, Great Britain; Grass	(Ireland) Lilian Pine-Coffin; 6-2, 6-4	(United Kingdom) Helen Jackson		
10 Aug.	North of Scotland Championships; Elgin, Great Britain; Clay	(Scotland) Miss Forsyth; 6-0, 6-2	(Scotland) Miss Daun		
10 Aug.	Scheveningen International; Scheveningen II, Netherlands; Hard	(United Kingdom) A. Smithers; 6-4, 2-6, 8-6	(Netherlands) C. van Lennep		
11 Aug.	British Columbia Championships; Victoria, Canada; Grass	(United States) Bessie Anderson; 4-6, 6-3, 6-3	(United States) Jessie Kershaw		
14 Aug.	North of Wales Open; Abergele, Great Britain; Grass	(United Kingdom) Mary Pick; 6-3, 6-1	(United Kingdom) Margaret Dickins		
16 Aug.	Stroud Open; Stroud, Great Britain; Grass	(United Kingdom) Emma Ridding; 2 - 0 sets	(United Kingdom) Mrs Story		
16 Aug.	Inter-White Mountain Tournament; Maplewood, United States; Grass	(United States) Mary Colahan; 3-6, 6-5, 6-4, 6-0	(United States) Lillian Cone		
18 Aug.	South of Scotland Championships; Moffat, Great Britain; Grass	(Scotland) Lottie Paterson (3) walkover	(United Kingdom) Jane Corder		
18 Aug.	Derbyshire Championships; Buxton, Great Britain; Grass	(United Kingdom) Blanche Hillyard (5); 6-4, 5-7, 7-5	(United Kingdom) Charlotte Cooper		
18 Aug.	East of England Championships; Felixstowe, Great Britain; Grasd	(United Kingdom) M. Burton; 6-3, retd.	(United Kingdom) E. Burton		
20 Aug.	Hilversum Open; Hilversum, Netherlands; Hard	(Netherlands) C. van Lennep; 6-2, 8-6, 6-4	(Netherlands) A. Blom-van Lennep		
23 Aug.	Falmouth Open; Falmouth, Great Britain; Grass	(United Kingdom) Agatha Templeman (2); 6-4, 6-4	(United Kingdom) Miss Boyd		
23 Aug.	North Wales Championships; Criccieth, Great Britain; Grass	(United Kingdom) Miss Turner def. ?	(United Kingdom) Edith Moorehouse		
25 Aug.	Yorkshire County Championships; Scarborough II, Great Britain; Grass	(United Kingdom) Beatrice Draffen; 6-3,, 6-1	(United Kingdom) Katherine Grey		
26 Aug.	Southern California Championships; Santa Monica, United States; Hard	(United States) Marion Jones; 8-6, 8-6	(United States) Fannie Shoemaker		

=== September ===
Ended	Tournament	Winner	Finalist	Semifinalist	Quarterfinalist
2 Sep.	Niagara International Championship; Niagara-on-the-Lake, Canada; Grass	(Canada) Maude Delano-Osborne (2); 4-6, 6-3, 6-4	(Canada) Mrs Whitehead		
7 Sep.	Nyack Open; Nyack, United States; Clay	(United States) Harriet Banks; 3-6, 6-0, 6-3, 9-7	(United States) Augusta Bradley		
7 Sep.	New York State Championships; Saratoga Springs, United States; Clay	(United States) Lena Ide; Default	(Ireland) Mabel Cahill		
7 Sep.	Singapore LLTC Autumn Open; Singapore II, Straits Settlements; Grass	(Straits Settlements) Mrs Lovell (2); 6-5, 6-4	(Straits Settlements) M. Keasberry		
9 Sep.	Haarlem International; Haarlem, Netherlands; Clay	(Netherlands) M. Viruly; 2-1 sets	(Netherlands) C. van Lennep		
10 Sep.	Sussex Championships; Brighton, England; Grass	(United Kingdom) Blanche Hillyard (6); 6-3, 6-0	(United Kingdom) Maud Shackle		
10 Sep.	Hamilton Ontario Open; Hamilton, Canada; Grass	(Canada) Mrs Whitehead; Won	(Canada) Maude Osborne		
10 Sep.	Pacific Coast Championships; San Rafael, United States; Hard	(United States) Bee Hooper; 5-7, 6-3, 6-3, 6-3	(United States) Ethel Bates		
14 Sep.	Staten Island Ladies Club Open; Livingston, United States; Grass	(United States) Juliette Atkinson (3); 6-0, 6-3	(United States) Harriet Banks		
15 Sep.	South of England Championships; Eastbourne, England; Grass	(United Kingdom) Helen Jackson (4); 6-4, 6-2	(United Kingdom) Charlotte Cooper		
15 Sep.	Pacific Northwest Championships; Tacoma, United States; Clay	(United States) Miss Kershaw; 6-2, 4-6, 7-5	(United States) Bessie Anderson		
17 Sep.	Dinard Ladies Cup; Dinard, France; Clay	(United Kingdom) Ivy Arbuthnot; 6-2, 6-8, 6-4	(United Kingdom) Alice Arbuthnot		
22 Sep.	Hohokus Valley TC Open; Ridgewood, United States; Clay	(United States) May Moore; 8-6, 6-0, 8-6	(United States) Bessie Moore		
23 Sep.	Boulogne International Championship; Boulogne-sur-Mer, France; Clay	(Scotland) Lottie Paterson (4); 6-0, 6-1	(United Kingdom) Miss Marsh		
30 Sep.	Bohemian Championships; Prague, Bohemia; Clay	(Bohemia) A. von Stoninka Holodow; 5-7, 6-3, retd.	(Bohemia) Hedwig Rosenbaum		

=== October ===
Ended	Tournament	Winner	Finalist	Semifinalist	Quarterfinalist
6 Oct.	Welsh Covered Court Championships; Llandudno II, Wales; Wood (i)	(United Kingdom) Margaret Dickins; 1-6, 6-4, 6-4	(United Kingdom) Ellen Cressy		

=== November ===
No events

=== December ===
Ended	Tournament	Winner	Finalist	Semifinalist	Quarterfinalist
1 Dec.	Victorian Championships; Melbourne, Australia; Grass	(Victoria (state)) Constance Raleigh; 6-5, 6-1	(Victoria (state)) Maisie Parr		
10 Dec.	Stanford University Championships; Stanford, United States; Hard	(United States) Anna Martin; Won	?		
24 Dec.	Transvaal Championships; Johannesburg, South Africa; Clay	(South African Republic) Mrs Airth; 6-1, 10-8	(South African Republic) Miss Vincent		
28 Dec.	New Zealand Championships; Christchurch, New Zealand; Grass	(New Zealand) Hilda Hitchings; 6-3, 6-4	(New Zealand) A. Meeson		

== Tournament winners ==
Players are listed by most titles won, major tournaments are in bold.

- (United Kingdom) Blanche Hillyard, Brighton, Buxton, **Irish Championships**, Leicester, **Northern Championships**, **Wimbledon Championships**, (6)
- (Wales) Edith Austin, Beckenham, Chiswick Park, West Kensington, West Kensington II, (4)
- (United Kingdom) , Helen Jackson, Eastbourne, Hexham, Newcastle, Penarth, (4)
- (Scotland) Lottie Paterson, Boulogne-sur-Mer, Moffat, Wemyss Bay, Wemyss Bay II, (4)
- (United States) Juliette Atkinson, Livingston, Montrose, New York City, (3)
- (Canada) , Maude Delano-Osborne, Niagara-on-the-Lake, Ottowa, (2)
- (United Kingdom) Agatha Templeman, Falmouth, Gainsborough, (2)
- (Australia) S. Dransfield, Goulburn, Sydney, (2)
- (United Kingdom) Kate Nunneley, Nottingham, Nottingham II, (2)
- (Straits Settlements) Mrs Lovell, Singapore, Singapore II, (2)
- (United Kingdom) Alice Pickering, Llandudno, Saxmundham, (2)
- (United Kingdom) Amy Wilson, Blackheath, Stamford Hill, (2)
- (United States) Helen Hellwig, **U.S. National Championships**, (1)

46 other players won a single title each (1).

== Season statistics ==
Category	Player	Result/Count
Most Singles Titles	(United Kingdom) Blanche Hillyard	**6**
Most Singles Finals	(United Kingdom) Blanche Hillyard	**7**
Most Singles Matches Played	(United Kingdom) Helen Jackson	**34**
Most Singles Matches Won	(United Kingdom) Helen Jackson	**30**
Best Win-Loss Record	(United Kingdom) Blanche Hillyard	**26–1 (96.3%)**

== See also ==
- 1894 men's tennis season

== Sources ==
- Wright and Ditson's Lawn Tennis Guide for 1895.
