= 1895 women's tennis season =

Women's tennis tournament series

1895 Women's Tennis Season
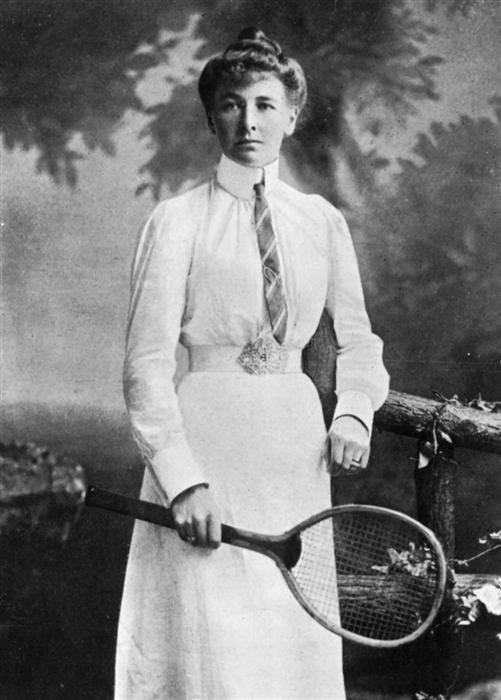
- Charlotte Cooper wins two major events this season the Wimbledon Championships and Irish Championships, but is not title leader Canada's Maude Delano-Osborne wins five events.

Details
- Duration: 12 January – 28 December 1895
- Edition: 20th
- Tournaments: 96

Achievements (singles)
- Most titles: (Canada) Maude Delano-Osborne (5)
- Most finals: (United Kingdom) Helen Jackson (9)

The 1895 Women's Tennis Season was a worldwide tennis circuit composed of 96 major, national, regional, provincial, state, county, metropolitan, city and regular tournaments. The season began on 12 January in Cape Town, South Africa and ended on 28 December in Auckland, New Zealand.

== Season summary ==
The 1895 season began on 12 January in Cape Town, South Africa with the Western Province Championships; the singles event was won by F.S. Green who defeated L. Myburgh in the final.

The first major event of the season was the Irish Championships which concluded on 1 June at the Fitzwilliam Club in Dublin, Ireland, the singles event was won by England's Charlotte Cooper who defeated Scotland's Lottie Paterson in two sets.

On 15 June at the second major event of the season the Northern Championships held at the Northern Lawn Tennis Club in Manchester, England, the singles event was won by Ireland's Louisa Martin who defeated England's Blanche Hillyard by walkover.

In North America the third major tournament of the season the U.S. National Championships was played at the Philadelphia Cricket Club, Philadelphia, United States, concluding on 29 June and was won by Juliette Atkinson who defeated Helena Hellwig in three sets.

At the fourth and final major tournament of the year the Wimbledon Championships played at the All England Club, Wimbledon, England, the singles event final on 15 July was won by England's Charlotte Cooper who defeated Helen Jackson in two sets.

The 1895 women's tennis season concluded on 28 December in Wellington, New Zealand with the New Zealand Championships, the singles title was won by Kate Nunneley who defeated Constance Lean in two sets.

== Season results ==
Notes:Hard includes asphalt, cement and concrete tennis courts, some European tournaments use the term to define clay courts they are shown as clay.

Key

Tournaments
Major
National
Professional
Worldwide
Team

Surface
Canvas – Indoor (0)
Clay – Outdoor (33)
Clay – Indoor (0)
Grass – Outdoor (50)
Hard – Outdoor (8)
Wood – Indoor (4)

=== January ===
Ended	Tournament	Winner	Finalist	Semifinalist	Quarterfinalist
12 Jan.	Western Province Championships; Cape Town, South Africa; Clay	(Cape Colony) F.S. Green; 6-4, 6-5	(Cape Colony) L. Myburgh		

=== February ===
Ended	Tournament	Winner	Finalist	Semifinalist	Quarterfinalist
11 Feb.	Croatia Ladies Lawn Tennis Tournament; Opatija, Croatia; Clay	(Kingdom of Croatia-Slavonia) Princess Stephanie; 1st prize	?		
16 Feb.	Auckland Championships; Auckland, New Zealand; Grass	(New Zealand) A. Nicholson; 4-6, 6-1, 6-4	(New Zealand) Miss Mowbry		

=== March ===
Ended	Tournament	Winner	Finalist	Semifinalist	Quarterfinalist
6 Mar.	Singapore LLTC Spring Open; Singapore; Grass	(Straits Settlements) Mrs. Waddell; 6-3, 6-5	(Straits Settlements) Mrs. Lovell		
14 Mar.	Nice International; Nice, France; Clay	(United Kingdom) Henrietta Barnard won	(United Kingdom) Miss Sharrock		
16 Mar.	Otago LTA Tournament; Dunedin, New Zealand; Grass	(New Zealand) L. Mackerras; 9-5 games	(New Zealand) F. Campbell		
22 Mar.	South African Championships; Port Elizabeth, South Africa; Clay	(Cape Colony) L. Biddulph; 6-1, 6-4	(Cape Colony) Miss Fry		

=== April ===
Ended	Tournament	Winner	Finalist	Semifinalist	Quarterfinalist
6 Apr.	British Covered Court Championships; West Kensington, Great Britain; Wood (i)	(United Kingdom) Charlotte Cooper; 6-4, 3-6, 6-1	(Wales) Edith Austin		
8 Apr.	South Australian Championships; Adelaide, Australia; Grass	(Australia) Lilian Payne; 6-2, 6-4	(Australia) Maisie Parr		
13 Apr.	Lac Léman Spring International; Montreux, Switzerland; Clay	(United Kingdom) Miss White won	(United Kingdom) Miss Attfield		
22 Apr.	Auckland Easter Open; Auckland, New Zealand; Grass	(New Zealand) A. Philcox; 9-5 games	(New Zealand) Miss Spiers		
27 Apr.	Welsh Covered Court Spring Championships; Llandudno, Great Britain; Wood (i)	(United Kingdom) Alice Pickering; 6-1, 6-0	(Ireland) Ruth Dyas		

=== May ===
Ended	Tournament	Winner	Finalist	Semifinalist	Quarterfinalist
6 May.	Ealing Championships; Ealing, Great Britain; Grass	(United Kingdom) Alice Brown won	?		
8 May.	International Championship of Prague; Prague, Bohemia; Clay	(Bohemia) Milada Cifkova won	?		
11 May.	Urana Shire Championship; Urana, Australia; Grass	(Australia) M. Devlin; 30-24 games	(Australia) Miss Danger		
11 May.	New South Wales Championships; Sydney, Australia; Grass	(Australia) Mabel Shaw; 6-3, 2-6, 6-3	(Australia) S. Dransfield		

=== June ===
Ended	Tournament	Winner	Finalist	Semifinalist	Quarterfinalist
1 Jun.	Irish Championships; Dublin, Ireland; Grass	(United Kingdom) Charlotte Cooper (Note: Cooper wins the "Triple Crown" (Singles, Doubles, and Mixed) at the Irish Championships event in Dublin) (2); 6-4, 6-4	(Scotland) Lottie Paterson		
3 Jun.	Rotterdam Cup; Rotterdam, Netherlands; Hard	(Netherlands) Elizabeth Viruly; 6-1, 3-6, 6-3	(Netherlands) Adrie de Jongh		
4 Jun.	Tynedale Open; Hexham, Great Britain; Grass	(United Kingdom) Lucy Kendal default	(United Kingdom) Beatrice Jackson		
8 Jun.	Middlesex Championships; Chiswick Park, Great Britain; Grass	(United Kingdom) Charlotte Cooper (3); 6-3, 7-5	(Wales) Edith Austin		
8 Jun.	Whitehouse Open; Edinburgh, Great Britain; Grass	(Scotland) Louisa Stoltz default	(Scotland) Mrs Kirkwood		
15 Jun.	Northern Championships; Manchester, Great Britain; Grass	(Ireland) Louisa Martin walkover	(United Kingdom) Blanche Hillyard		
15 Jun.	Kent County Championships; Blackheath, Great Britain; Grass	(United Kingdom) Georgina Wilson; 6-4, 6-2	(United Kingdom) Mrs Waring		
15 Jun.	Austrian Lawn Tennis Tournament (Note: The 1895 Austrian Lawn Tennis Tournament in Prague was the second edition of what would become the Austrian International Championships. At this time, Prague was a primary tennis center of the Austro-Hungarian Empire.); Prague, Bohemia; Clay	(Bohemia) Kara von Nostitz; 6-4, 6-4	(Bohemia) Hedwig Rosenbaum		
17 Jun.	Brisbane All Comers Ladies Tournament; Ipswich, Australia; Grass	(Australia) Lucy Real won	(Australia) M. Real		
20 Jun.	Burton-on-Trent Open; Burton-on-Trent, Great Britain; Grass	(United Kingdom) Hilda Lane; 6-4, 6-4	(United Kingdom) Ida Cressy		
22 Jun.	Central Park Championship; Manhattan, United States; Grass	(United States) Juliette Atkinson; 6-4, 6-2, 6-3	(United States) Mary Millett		
22 Jun.	West of England Championships; Bath, Great Britain; Grass	(United Kingdom) Helen Jackson; 6-1, 6-1	(Ireland) Madeline O'Neill		
22 Jun.	Kent All Comers Championships (Note: The Beckenham Open Tennis Tournament included the Kent All-Comers Championship as part of the programme of events staged.); Beckenham, Great Britain; Grass	(Wales) Edith Austin; 6-3, 6-1	(United Kingdom) Amy Wilson		
29 Jun.	London Championships; West Kensington, Great Britain; Grass	(United Kingdom) Maud Shackle; 6-2, 7-5	(Wales) Edith Austin		
29 Jun.	Bristol & Clifton Open; Bristol, Great Britain; Grass	(United Kingdom) Helen Jackson (2); 6-3, 6-1	(United Kingdom) Alice Pickering		
29 Jun.	U.S. National Championships; Philadelphia, United States; Grass	(United States) Juliette Atkinson (2); 6-4, 6-3, 6-2	(United States) Helena Hellwig		

=== July ===
Ended	Tournament	Winner	Finalist	Semifinalist	Quarterfinalist
4 Jul.	Welsh Championships; Penarth, Great Britain; Grass	(United Kingdom) Jane Corder; 4-6, 7-5, 6-4	(United Kingdom) Helen Jackson		
6 Jul.	Mid-Kent Championships; Maidstone, Great Britain; Grass	(United Kingdom) Nora Green; 7-5, 5-3, retd.	(United Kingdom) Mrs Blackett		
6 Jul.	Gipsy Championships; Stamford Hill, Great Britain; Grass	(United Kingdom) Dorothea Childs; 6-4, 6-4	(United Kingdom) Ruth Pennington-Legh		
6 Jul.	Nottinghamshire Open; Nottingham, Great Britain; Grass	(United Kingdom) Miss Snook; 6-3, 2-6, 6-0	(United Kingdom) Elsie Vaudrey		
8 Jul.	Leiden Championships; Leiden, Netherlands; Clay	(Netherlands) Nellie Matthes won	(Netherlands) Louise Matthes		
9 Jul.	Bad Kissingen International Tournament; Bad Kissingen, Germany; Grass	(Germany) Frl von Helldorf; 7-5, 6-4	(Germany) Baroness Waldsheel		
13 Jul.	Sheffield & Hallamshire Tournament; Sheffield, Great Britain; Grass	(Ireland) Ruth Dyas; 7-5, 6-3	(United Kingdom) Gertrude Provis		
13 Jul.	Canadian Championships; Niagara-on-the-Lake, Canada; Grass	(Canada) Mrs Sydney Smith; 3-6, 6-1, 6-3	(Canada) Maude Delano-Osborne		
15 Jul.	Wimbledon Championships; Wimbledon, Great Britain; Grass	(United Kingdom) Charlotte Cooper (4); 7-5, 8-6	(United Kingdom) Helen Jackson		
20 Jul.	Gainsborough Championships; Gainsborough, Great Britain; Grass	(United Kingdom) Amy Wilson; 6-2, 6-4	(United Kingdom) Agatha Templeman		
24 Jul.	Warwickshire Championships; Leamington Spa, Great Britain; Grass	(Ireland) Ruth Dyas (2) walkover	(United Kingdom) Lucy Kendal		
27 Jul.	Washington State Tournament; Seattle, United States; Clay	(United States) Bessie Anderson; 6-3, 6-3	(United States) Miss Riley		
27 Jul.	Midland Counties Championships; Edgbaston, Great Britain; Grass	(United Kingdom) Winifred Longhurst; 4-6, 6-4, 7-5	(United Kingdom) Caroline Jones		

=== August ===
Ended	Tournament	Winner	Finalist	Semifinalist	Quarterfinalist
1 Aug.	Essex Championships; Colchester, Great Britain; Grass	(United Kingdom) Agatha Templeman; 6-4, 6-2	(United Kingdom) Agnes Morton		
3 Aug.	Queensland Championships; Brisbane, Australia; Grass	(Australia) Amy Pratten; 6-4, 5-7, 7-5	(Australia) Amy Pugh		
3 Aug.	Northumberland Championships; Newcastle, Great Britain; Grass	(United Kingdom) Charlotte Cooper (5); 7-5, 6-1	(United Kingdom) Helen Jackson		
8 Aug.	Stroud Open; Stroud, Great Britain; Grass	(United Kingdom) Henrica Ridding; 8-6, 4-6, 7-5	(United Kingdom) Emma Ridding		
9 Aug.	British Columbia Championships; Victoria, Canada; Grass	(Canada) Muriel Goward; 4-6, 6-4, 6-0	(Canada) Miss Anderson		
10 Aug.	Trefriw Open; Trefriw, Great Britain; Grass	(Ireland) Ruth Dyas (3); 4-6, 6-3, 7-5	(United Kingdom) Miss Murray		
10 Aug.	West of Scotland Championships; Wemyss Bay, Great Britain; Grass	(Scotland) Lottie Paterson; 6-2, 6-1	(Scotland) K. Jamieson		
10 Aug.	Netherlands National Championships; Scheveningen, Netherlands; Clay	(Netherlands) B. van Aken won	(Netherlands) C. van Rees		
10 Aug.	Exmouth Open; Exmouth, Great Britain; Grass	(United Kingdom) Helen Jackson (3); 6-0, 3-6, 6-3	(United Kingdom) Jane Corder		
14 Aug.	Scheveningen International; Scheveningen, Netherlands; Clay	(Netherlands) Christine van Lennep won	(United Kingdom) Mrs Smythe		
17 Aug.	Pacific Northwest Championships; Tacoma, United States; Hard	(United States) Jessica Kershaw; 6-0, 6-0	(United States) Mrs Eaton		
17 Aug.	East of England Championships; Felixstowe, Great Britain; Grass	(United Kingdom) Elsie Lane; 6-1, 6-3	(United Kingdom) Ada Inge		
17 Aug.	Derbyshire Championships; Buxton, Great Britain; Grass	(United Kingdom) Helen Jackson (4); 6-3, 3-6, 6-3	(United Kingdom) Blanche Hillyard		
20 Aug.	Homburg Ladies Cup; Bad Homburg, Germany; Clay	(United Kingdom) Toupie Lowther; 6-2, 6-1	(Germany) Sigrid Pollen		
21 Aug.	St. Moritz Klum Hotel Tournament; St. Moritz, Switzerland; Clay	(Austria-Hungary) Irma Palffy won	(Austria-Hungary) Paulina Palffy		
22 Aug.	Suffolk Championships; Saxmundham, Great Britain; Grass	(United Kingdom) Elsie Lane (2); 6-2, 7-5	(United Kingdom) Alice Pickering		
22 Aug.	North Wales Championships; Criccieth, Great Britain; Grass	(Wales) Miss Turner default	(United Kingdom) Ethel Moorhouse		
24 Aug.	Scottish Championships; Moffat, Great Britain; Grass	(Scotland) Lottie Paterson (2); 8-6, 6-3	(United Kingdom) Ida Cressy		
24 Aug.	Yorkshire Championships; Scarborough, Great Britain; Grass	(United Kingdom) Lucy Kendal (2); 6-2, 6-1	(United Kingdom) Mrs Morton		
25 Aug.	Hilversum International; Hilversum, Netherlands; Hard	(Netherlands) C. van Lennep (2) won	(Netherlands) Mev. Blom-van Lennep		
25 Aug.	Étretat Championship; Étretat, France; Clay	(France) Rita Garet; 6-2, 6-3	(France) Mme A. Wallet		
26 Aug.	Singapore LLTC Summer Open; Singapore; Clay	(Straits Settlements) Mrs Waddell (2); 4-6, 6-0, 6-4	(Straits Settlements) Mrs Salzmann		
27 Aug.	Longwood Tennis Cup; Boston, United States; Grass	(United States) Mary Larned won	(United States) Miss Hovey		
30 Aug.	Niagara International Championship; Niagara-on-the-Lake, Canada; Grass	(Canada) Maude Delano-Osborne; 2-6, 6-0, 6-2	(United States) Emily Smith		
31 Aug.	Marion Street TC Open; Seattle, United States; Clay	(United States) Miss Riley; 6-2, 6-2	(United States) Miss Gazzam		

=== September ===
Ended	Tournament	Winner	Finalist	Semifinalist	Quarterfinalist
1 Sep.	Southern California Championships; Santa Monica, United States; Hard	(United States) Marion Jones won	(United States) Mrs Hendrick		
1 Sep.	Hudson River Association Championships; Poughkeepsie, United States; Grass	(United States) Augusta Bradley won	(United States) F. Baker		
6 Sep.	Buffalo Open; Buffalo, United States; Grass	(Canada) Maude Delano-Osborne (2); 6-1, 6-2	(Canada) Mrs Sydney Smith		
7 Sep.	Sussex Championships; Brighton, Great Britain; Grass	(United Kingdom) Blanche Hillyard; 6-2, 6-2	(United Kingdom) Helen Jackson		
7 Sep.	Penang Golf Club Ladies Tournament; Georgetown, Malaya; Grass	(Straits Settlements) P.K. Shaw; 6-2, 6-5	(Straits Settlements) W. Hargreaves		
9 Sep.	Pacific Coast Championships; San Rafael, United States; Hard	(United States) Marion Jones (2); 7-5, 3-6, 6-3	(United States) Bea Hopper		
9 Sep.	Ontario Championships; Hamilton, Canada; Grass	(Canada) Maude Delano-Osborne (4); 6-3, 12-10	(United States) Emily Smith		
10 Sep.	Dinard Ladies Cup; Dinard, France; Clay	(United Kingdom) Ivy Arbuthnot; 3-6, 6-2, 7-5	(United Kingdom) Alice Arbuthnot		
13 Sep.	City of Toronto Championships; Toronto II, Canada; Clay	(Canada) Maude Delano-Osborne (3); 6-1, 4-6, 6-3	(Canada) Mrs Sydney Smith		
14 Sep.	Sleepy Hollow Open; Sleepy Hollow, United States; Grass	(United States) Helena Hellwig; 6-1, 6-2	(United States) Augusta Bradley		
14 Sep.	South of England Championships; Eastbourne, Great Britain; Grass	(United Kingdom) Blanche Hillyard (2); 6-4, 6-1	(United Kingdom) Helen Jackson		
15 Sep.	North Dakota State Tournament; Grand Forks, United States; Grass	(United States) L. Baptie; 4-6, 6-3, 6-4, 6-1	(United States) Miss Jacobi		
22 Sep.	Boulogne International Championship; Boulogne-sur-Mer, France; Clay	(Scotland) Lottie Paterson (3); 6-1, 6-0	(United Kingdom) Florence Gould		
22 Sep.	Ladies Western Championships; Chicago, United States; Grass	(United States) Marion Capwell; 6-2, 6-2, 3-6, 4-6, 7-5	(United States) Carrie Neely		
27 Sep.	Staten Island Ladies Club Open; Livingston, United States; Grass	(United States) Helena Hellwig (2); 6-1, 12-10, 3-6, 5-7, 6-2	(United States) Elisabeth Moore		
30 Sep.	Championships of Prague; Prague, Bohemia; Clay	(Bohemia) H. Fitz-Gerald; 6-3, 6-4, 2-6, 6-4	(Bohemia) Zdeňka Adned		

=== October ===
Ended	Tournament	Winner	Finalist	Semifinalist	Quarterfinalist
3 Oct.	Bad Kreuznach Autumn International; Bad Kreuznach, Germany; Clay	(United Kingdom) Miss Spensley; 1st & 2nd prizes	(United Kingdom) Miss Spensley		
5 Oct.	Welsh Covered Court Championships; Llandudno II, Great Britain; Wood (i)	(United Kingdom) Alice Pickering (2); 6-0, 6-4	(United Kingdom) Ida Cressy		
6 Oct.	Bohemian Crown Lands Championship; Prague, Bohemia; Clay	(Bohemia) Milada Cifka (2) won	(Bohemia) Albina Spens-Boden		
18 Oct.	Vassar College Championships; Poughkeepsie, United States; Grass	(United States) H. S. Banks; 6-2, 6-3, 6-4	(United States) Agnes Booth		

=== November ===
Ended	Tournament	Winner	Finalist	Semifinalist	Quarterfinalist
6 Nov.	Western Australian Championships; Perth, Australia; Grass	(Australia) Miss Bell; 6-3, 7-5	(Australia) Miss Macklin		
23 Nov.	Victorian Championships; Melbourne, Australia; Grass	(Australia) Phoebe Howitt; 6-2, 6-5	(Australia) Mabel Shaw		
27 Nov.	French Covered Court Championships; Paris, France; Wood (i)	(France) Adine Masson; 6-3, 6-2	(United Kingdom) Mrs Underwood		

=== December ===
Ended	Tournament	Winner	Finalist	Semifinalist	Quarterfinalist
10 Dec.	Stanford University Championships; Stanford, United States; Asphalt	(United States) Anna Martin; 3-6, 8-6, 6-1, 6-3	(United States) Miss McCray		
28 Dec.	New Zealand Championships; Wellington, New Zealand; Grass	(New Zealand) Kate Nunneley; 6-1, 6-1	(New Zealand) Constance Lean		
28 Dec.	Auckland Christmas Tournament; Auckland, New Zealand; Grass	(New Zealand) E.M. Paterson; 9-4 games	(New Zealand) Amy Philcox		

== Tournament winners ==
Players are listed by most titles won, major tournaments are in bold.

- (Canada) Maude Delano-Osborne, Buffalo, Hamilton, Niagara-on-the-Lake, Toronto, Toronto II, (5)
- (United Kingdom) Charlotte Cooper, Chiswick Park, Newcastle, **Wimbledon Championships**, West Kensington, (4)
- (United Kingdom) Helen Jackson, Bath, Bristol, Buxton, Exmouth, (4)
- (Ireland) Ruth Dyas, Leamington Spa, Sheffield, Trefriw, (3)
- (Scotland) Lottie Paterson, Boulogne-sur-Mer, Moffat, Wemyss Bay (3)
- (United Kingdom) Alice Pickering, Llandudno, Llandudno II, (2)
- (United Kingdom) Lucy Kendal, Hexham, Scarborough, (2)
- (United States) Juliette Atkinson, Manhattan, **U.S. National Championships**, (2)
- (Netherlands) Christine van Lennep, Hilversum, Scheveningen (2)
- (United Kingdom) Elsie Lane, Felixstowe, Saxmundham, (2)
- (United States) Marion Jones, Santa Monica, San Rafael, (2)
- (United Kingdom) Blanche Hillyard, Brighton, Eastbourne, (2)
- (United States) Helena Hellwig, Livingston, Sleepy Hollow, (2)
- (Straits Settlements) Mrs Waddell, Singapore, Singapore II, (2)
- (Bohemia) Milada Cifkova, Prague, Prague IV, (2)
- (Ireland) Louisa Martin, **Irish Championships**, (1)

43 other players won a single title each (1).

== Season statistics ==
- denotes min 18 matches, ** min 30 matches played.

Category	Player	Result/Count
Most Singles Titles	(Canada) Maude Delano-Osborne	5
Most Singles Finals	(United Kingdom) Helen Jackson	9
Most Singles Matches Played	(United Kingdom) Helen Jackson	32
Most Singles Matches Won	(United Kingdom) Helen Jackson	26
Best Win-Loss Record *	(United Kingdom) Charlotte Cooper	17–1, 94.4%
Best Win-Loss Record **	(United Kingdom) Helen Jackson	32–6, 84.2%

== Sources ==
- British Newspaper Archive
- Google News Archive
- National Library of South Africa (NLSA) Digital Collections
- Papers Past
- Trove - National Library of Australia (NLA)
