= 1896 women's tennis season =

1896 Women's Tennis Season
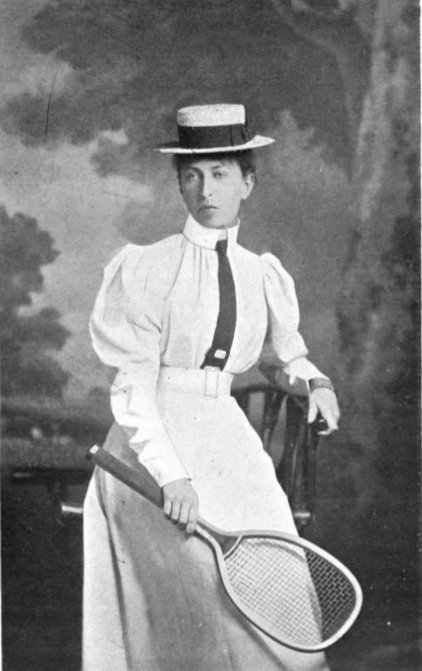
- Blanche Hillyard is title leader this season, and finalist at the Northern Championships.

Details
- Duration: 13 January – 30 December 1896
- Edition: 21st
- Tournaments: 88

Achievements (singles)
- Most titles: (United Kingdom) Blanche Hillyard (5)
- Most finals: (United Kingdom) Charlotte Cooper (6)

The 1896 Women's Tennis Season was a worldwide tennis circuit composed of 88 major, national, regional, provincial, state, county, metropolitan, city and regular tournaments. The season began on 13 January in Nice, France and ended on 30 December in Nelson, New Zealand.

== Season summary ==
The 1896 season began on 13 January in Nice, France with the Nice LTC Championships; the singles event was won by British player Mrs A. Booth who defeated her daughter Katherine Booth in the final.

The first major event of the season was the Irish Championships the concluded on 30 May at the Fitzwilliam Club in Dublin, Ireland, the singles event was won by Ireland's Louisa Martin who defeated England's Charlotte Cooper in three sets.

On 20 June at the second major event of the season the Northern Championships held at the Northern Lawn Tennis Club in Manchester, England, the singles event was won by Ireland's Louisa Martin her second major of the season, when she Englands Blanche Hillyard in straight sets.

In North America the third major tournament of the season the U.S. National Championships was played at the Philadelphia Cricket Club, Philadelphia, United States, concluding on 21 June and was won by Elisabeth Moore who defeated Juliette Atkinson in four sets.

At the fourth and final major tournament of the year the Wimbledon Championships played at the All England Club, Wimbledon, England, the singles event final on 15 July was won by England's Charlotte Cooper who defeated Alice Pickering in two sets, claiming her second Wimbledon title.

The 1896 women's tennis season concluded on 30 December in Nelson, New Zealand with the New Zealand Championships, the singles title was won by Kate Nunneley who defeated a Miss Kennedy in two sets..

== Season results ==
Notes:Hard includes asphalt, cement and concrete tennis courts, some European tournaments use the term to define clay courts they are shown as clay.

Key

Tournaments
Major
National
Professional
Worldwide
Team

Surface
Canvas – Indoor (0)
Clay – Outdoor (25)
Clay – Indoor (0)
Grass – Outdoor (55)
Hard – Outdoor (5)
Wood – Indoor (3)

=== January ===
Ended	Tournament	Winner	Finalist	Semifinalist	Quarterfinalist
13 Jan.	Nice LTC Championships; Nice, France; Clay	(United Kingdom) Mrs Alfred Booth; 7-5, 4-6, 6-1	(United Kingdom) Katherine Booth		
18 Jan.	Western Province Championships; Cape Town, South Africa; Clay	(Cape Colony) Frances Sarah Green; 6-4, 6-1	(Cape Colony) Lettie Myburgh		

=== February ===
Ended	Tournament	Winner	Finalist	Semifinalist	Quarterfinalist
22 Feb.	Otago LTA Tournament; Dunedin, New Zealand; Grass	(New Zealand) Freda Campbell; 9-7 (one set only)	(New Zealand) Lily Mackerras		

=== March ===
Ended	Tournament	Winner	Finalist	Semifinalist	Quarterfinalist
7 Mar.	Auckland LTA Championships; Auckland, New Zealand; Grass	(New Zealand) Annie Nicholson; 6-3, 6-3	(New Zealand) Ruth Spiers		
7 Mar.	Singapore LLTC Spring Open; Singapore; Grass	(Straits Settlements) Mrs. Waddell; 6-1, 6-3	(Straits Settlements) Mrs Murray		
14 Mar.	South Australian Championships; Adelaide, Australia; Grass	(Australia) Lilian Payne; 6-3, 6-3	(Australia) Maisie Parr		
22 Mar.	South of France Championships; Nice, France; Clay	(United Kingdom) Katherine Booth won	(France) Adine Masson		
29 Mar.	Monte-Carlo (Second Meeting); Monte Carlo II, Monaco; Clay	(United Kingdom) Blanche Hillyard won	(United Kingdom) Alice Taunton-Collins		
29 Mar.	Monte-Carlo International; Monte Carlo, Monaco; Clay	(United Kingdom) Katherine Booth (2) won	(France) Mlle Guillon		

=== April ===
Ended	Tournament	Winner	Finalist	Semifinalist	Quarterfinalist
8 Apr.	Whakatane Tournament; Whakatane, New Zealand; Grass	(New Zealand) Jane McGarvey; 4-6, 7-5, 3-6, 6-3, 6-2	(New Zealand) Mary Butler		
14 Apr.	Tasmanian Championships; Hobart, Australia; Grass	(Australia) Nina Rock; 0-6, 6-4, 6-2	(Australia) Elizabeth Howe		
18 Apr.	British Covered Court Championships; West Kensington, Great Britain; Wood (i)	(Wales) Edith Austin; 6-2, 3-6, 6-3	(United Kingdom) Charlotte Cooper		

=== May ===
Ended	Tournament	Winner	Finalist	Semifinalist	Quarterfinalist
9 May.	New South Wales Championships; Sydney, Australia; Grass	(Australia) Kate Nunneley; 6-2, 6-0	(Australia) Mabel Shaw		
17 May.	Championships of the Hawaiian Islands; Honolulu, Republic of Hawaii; Clay	(United States) May Hart; 6-2, 6-0, 6-0	(United States) Grace King		
26 May.	Tynedale Open; Hexham, Great Britain; Grass	(United Kingdom) Beatrice Draffen; 6-4, 8-6	(United Kingdom) Lucy Kendal		
26 May.	Ealing Championships; West Ealing, Great Britain; Grass	(United Kingdom) Alice Brown; 7-5, 6-4	(United Kingdom) Henrietta Horncastle		
30 May.	German Championships; Hamburg, Germany; Clay	(Germany) Maren Thomsen; 6-3, 6-2, 7-5	(Germany) E. Lantzius		
30 May.	Irish Championships; Dublin, Ireland; Grass	(Ireland) Louisa Martin; 6-0, 3-6, 6-2	(United Kingdom) Charlotte Cooper		

=== June ===
Ended	Tournament	Winner	Finalist	Semifinalist	Quarterfinalist
6 Jun.	Middlesex Championships; Chiswick Park, Great Britain; Grass	(United Kingdom) Charlotte Cooper; 6-4, 6-2	(Wales) Edith Austin		
6 Jun.	Baden Baden International; Baden-Baden, Germany; Clay	(United Kingdom) Elsie Lane; 6-1, 6-0	(Germany) Frl Zographo		
6 Jun.	Championships of New Jersey; Ridgewood, United States; Grass	(United States) Elisabeth Moore; 6-4, 6-8, 6-1	(United States) Lulu Mowry		
7 Jun.	Austrian Lawn Tennis Tournament; Prague, Bohemia; Clay	(Bohemia) Renate Birgin; 6-3, 7-5	(Bohemia) Karolina von Nostitz		
8 Jun.	Leiden Championships; Leiden, Netherlands; Clay	(Netherlands) Nellie Matthes; 3-6, 6-4, 6-4	(Netherlands) Anny Brants		
13 Jun.	Middle States Championships; Montrose, United States; Grass	(United States) Elisabeth Moore (2); 2-6, 6-3, 2-1, retd.	(United States) Juliette Atkinson		
13 Jun.	Kent County Championships; Blackheath, Great Britain; Grass	(United Kingdom) Georgina Wilson; 6-3, 6-3	(United Kingdom) K. M. Fraser		
20 Jun.	Northern Championships; Liverpool, Great Britain; Grass	(Ireland) Louisa Martin (2); 6-2, 7-5	(United Kingdom) Blanche Hillyard		
20 Jun.	Kent Championships; Beckenham, Great Britain; Grass	(Wales) Edith Austin (2); 6-4, 2-6, 6-4	(United Kingdom) Ruth Pennington-Legh		
21 Jun.	U.S. National Championships; Philadelphia, United States; Grass	(United States) Elisabeth Moore (3); 6-4, 4-6, 6-2, 6-2	(United States) Juliette Atkinson		
27 Jun.	London Championships; West Kensington II, Great Britain; Grass	(United Kingdom) Charlotte Cooper (2); 6-3, 6-2	(United Kingdom) Agatha Templeman		
27 Jun.	Burton-on-Trent Open; Burton-on-Trent, Great Britain; Grass	(United Kingdom) Elsie Lane (2); 4-6, 6-0, 6-3	(United Kingdom) Ida Cressy		
29 Jun.	Championships of Berlin; Berlin, Germany; Clay	(Germany) Clara von der Schulenburg; 6-3, 6-1, 6-2	(Germany) Tila Steinmann		

=== July ===
Ended	Tournament	Winner	Finalist	Semifinalist	Quarterfinalist
4 Jul.	West of England Championships; Bristol, Great Britain; Grass	(United Kingdom) Charlotte Cooper (3); 4-6, 7-5, 6-3	(Ireland) Ruth Dyas		
4 Jul.	Gipsy Championships; Stamford Hill, Great Britain; Grass	(United Kingdom) Agatha Templeman; 6-2, 6-3	(United Kingdom) Amy Wilson		
4 Jul.	Nottinghamshire Open; Nottingham, Great Britain; Grass	(United Kingdom) Frances Snook; 6-1, 6-1	(United Kingdom) Miss Hungerford		
8 Jul.	Warwickshire Championships; Leamington Spa, Great Britain; Grass	(United Kingdom) Alice Pickering; 4-6, 7-5, 7-5	(Ireland) Ruth Dyas		
11 Jul.	Sheffield and Hallamshire Championships; Sheffield, Great Britain; Grass	(United Kingdom) Gertrude Provis; 6-4, 6-4	(United Kingdom) Beatrice Draffen		
13 Jul.	Anglo Dutch Open; Rotterdam, Netherlands; Hard	(Netherlands) E. Viruly; 6-3, 6-5	(Netherlands) J. Viruly		
18 Jul.	Canadian Championships; Niagara-on-the-Lake, Canada; Grass	(United States) Juliette Atkinson; 6-1, 6-2	(Canada) Mrs Sydney Smith		
21 Jul.	Wimbledon Championships; Wimbledon, Great Britain; Grass	(United Kingdom) Charlotte Cooper (4); 6-2, 6-3	(United Kingdom) Alice Pickering		
25 Jul.	Washington State Tournament; Seattle, United States; Clay	(United States) Miss Kershaw; 6-4, 6-5	(United States) Miss Folsom		
25 Jul.	Natal Championships; Durban, South Africa; Grass	(Colony of Natal) Norah Hickman; 6-4, 6-2	(Colony of Natal) Una Turnbull		
25 Jul.	Midland Counties Championships; Edgbaston, Great Britain; Grass	(United Kingdom) Bertha Steedman; 6-4, 6-2	(United Kingdom) Katherine Grey		
31 Jul.	Llandudno Open; Craigside, Great Britain; Grass	(United Kingdom) Winifred Longhurst; 6-0, 6-2	(United Kingdom) Emma Ridding		

=== August ===
Ended	Tournament	Winner	Finalist	Semifinalist	Quarterfinalist
1 Aug.	Northumberland County Championships; Newcastle, Great Britain; Grass	(United Kingdom) Blanche Hillyard (2); 7-5, 6-0	(United Kingdom) Bertha Steedman		
5 Aug.	West of Scotland Championships; Wemyss Bay, Great Britain; Grass	(Scotland) Lottie Paterson; 6-1, 6-1	(Scotland) K. Jackson		
7 Aug.	British Columbia Championships; Victoria, Canada; Grass	(Canada) Muriel Goward; 6-0, 5-7, 6-2	(Canada) Bessie Burton		
8 Aug.	Stroud Open; Stroud, Great Britain; Grass	(United Kingdom) Emma Ridding; 1-6, 6-1, 6-4	(United Kingdom) Miss Rose		
9 Aug.	Scottish Championships; Moffat, Great Britain; Grass	(Scotland) Lottie Paterson (2); 6-3, 8-6	(United Kingdom) Ida Cressy		
11 Aug.	Netherlands National Championships; The Hague, Netherlands; Clay	(Netherlands) Anthonie van Aken won	(Netherlands) E. Viruly		
12 Aug.	Pacific Northwest Championships; Tacoma, United States; Clay	(United States) Jessica Kershaw; 4-6, 6-3, 6-4	(United States) Miss Riggs		
14 Aug.	East of England Championships; Colchester, Great Britain; Grass	(United Kingdom) Emma Ridding (2) divided title & prizes	(United Kingdom) Henrica Ridding		
15 Aug.	Derbyshire Championships; Buxton, Great Britain; Grass	(United Kingdom) Blanche Hillyard (3); 6-4, 3-6, 7-5	(United Kingdom) Bertha Steedman		
15 Aug.	Trefriw Open; Conway, Great Britain; Grass	(Ireland) Ruth Dyas; 6-1, 6-0	(United Kingdom) Constance Hill		
18 Aug.	Championships of Switzerland; St. Moritz, Switzerland; Clay	(France) Mlle. de Salignac-Fénelon; 7-5, 6-8, 6-2	(Hungary) Paulina Palffy		
20 Aug.	Scheveningen International; Scheveningen, Netherlands; Clay	(Netherlands) Anthonie van Aken (2); 6-0, 6-2	(Netherlands) Christine van Lennep		
20 Aug.	Suffolk Championships; Saxmundham, Great Britain; Grass	(United Kingdom) Henrietta Horncastle; 0-6, 7-5, 6-3	(United Kingdom) Henrica Ridding		
21 Aug.	North Wales Championships; Criccieth, Great Britain; Grass	(Wales) Mary Pick; 6-3, 6-3	(United Kingdom) Miss Coxson		
22 Aug.	Yorkshire Open; Scarborough, Great Britain; Grass	(United Kingdom) Lucy Kendal; 6-0, 8-6	(United Kingdom) Beatrice Draffen		
24 Aug.	First English Club Championships; Vienna, Austria; Clay	(Austria-Hungary) Frl. Berger; 6-3, 3-6, 15-13	(Austria-Hungary) Frl. Fanger		
27 Aug.	Homburg Ladies Cup; Bad Homburg, Germany; Clay	(United Kingdom) Elsie Lane (3); 6-0, 6-2	(United Kingdom) Toupie Lowther		
28 Aug.	Hudson River Association Championships; Poughkeepsie, United States; Grass	(United States) Mabel Ferris; 6-0, 6-2, 6-2	(United States) Augusta Chapman		
29 Aug.	Queensland Championships; Brisbane, Australia; Grass	(Australia) Ethel Mant; 6-2, 6-1	(Australia) Amy Pratten		
29 Aug.	Southern California Championships; Santa Monica, United States; Hard	(United States) Marion Jones; 6-1, 6-0	(United States) Miss Hendrick		
30 Aug.	Étretat International Championships; Étretat, France; Clay	(United Kingdom) Mrs Taunton-Collins; 6-1, 6-0	(France) Mlle Kahn		
30 Aug.	Niagara International Championship; Niagara-on-the-Lake, Canada; Grass	(United States) Juliette Atkinson (2); 6-2, 7-5	(United States) Kathleen Atkinson		
31 Aug.	Marion T.C. Ladies Open; Seattle, United States; Clay	(United States) Miss Riley; 4-6, 6-4, 4-3 retired	(United States) Mrs. Howell		

=== September ===
Ended	Tournament	Winner	Finalist	Semifinalist	Quarterfinalist
1 Sep.	Boulogne International Championship; Boulogne-sur-Mer, France; Clay	(Scotland) Lottie Paterson (3); 6-0, 6-0	(United Kingdom) Florence Gould		
1 Sep.	Singapore LLTC Autumn Open; Singapore; Grass	(Straits Settlements) Mrs. G.S. Murray; 6-4, 6-1	(Straits Settlements) Mrs. Salzmann		
4 Sep.	Bournemouth Open; Bournemouth, Great Britain; Grass	(United Kingdom) Violet Pinckney; 6-3, 6-1	(United Kingdom) Amy Ransome		
6 Sep.	City of Toronto Championships; Toronto, Canada; Grass	(United States) Juliette Atkinson (3); 6-3, 6-3	(Canada) M. Davis		
7 Sep.	Ladies Western States Championships; Chicago, United States; Grass	(United States) Jennie Craven; 8-6, 6-3, 6-0	(United States) Carrie Neely		
9 Sep.	Pacific Coast Championships; Del Monte, United States; Hard	(United States) Bee Hooper default	?		
13 Sep.	Dinard Ladies Cup; Dinard, France; Clay	(United Kingdom) Ivy Arbuthnot default	(United Kingdom) May Arbuthnot		
13 Sep.	South of England Championships; Eastbourne, Great Britain; Grass	(United Kingdom) Blanche Hillyard (4); 6-3, 4-6, 6-1	(Wales) Edith Austin		
13 Sep.	Sleepy Hollow Open; Tarrytown, United States; Clay	(United States) Mabel Ferris (2); 4-6, 6-3, 6-3	(United States) Carrie Ferris		
15 Sep.	Hilversum International; Hilversum, Netherlands; Hard	(Netherlands) Fanny Blijdenstein; 6-5, 6-1	(Netherlands) Christine van Lennep		
19 Sep.	Saint-Servant Ladies Cup; Saint-Servan-sur-Mer, France; Clay	(United Kingdom) Ivy Arbuthnot (2); 6-3, 9-7	(United Kingdom) Patricia Richardson		
21 Sep.	Sussex Championships; Brighton, Great Britain; Grass	(United Kingdom) Blanche Hillyard (5); 3-6, 6-4, 6-1	(United Kingdom) Charlotte Cooper		
26 Sep.	Welsh Covered Court Championships; Llandudno, Great Britain; Wood (i)	(United Kingdom) Alice Pickering (2); 6-1, 7-5	(United Kingdom) Henrica Ridding		
26 Sep.	Staten Island Ladies Club Open; Livingston, United States; Grass	(United States) Bessie Moore (4); 6-2, 5-7, 6-1	(United States) Helen Hellwig		
29 Sep.	Bohemian Crown Lands Championships; Prague II, Bohemia; Clay	(Bohemia) Milada Cifkova; 6-2, 3-6, 6-3, 6-3	(Bohemia) Gabby Rössler		
29 Sep.	City of Prague Championships; Prague III, Bohemia; Clay	(Bohemia) Hedwig Rosenbaum; 6-1, 6-4, 3-6, 4-6, 6-2	(Bohemia) Milada Cifkova		

=== October ===
Ended	Tournament	Winner	Finalist	Semifinalist	Quarterfinalist
10 Oct.	Hunter River District LTA Tournament; Stockton, Australia; Grass	(Australia) Miss Bowden; 6-2, 6-1	(Australia) Miss Grierson		

=== November ===
Ended	Tournament	Winner	Finalist	Semifinalist	Quarterfinalist
14 Nov.	Victorian Championships; Melbourne, Australia; Grass	(Australia) Phoebe Howitt; 6-2, 6-2	(Australia) Constance Raleigh		
21 Nov.	Western Australian Championships; Perth, Australia; Asphalt	(Australia) Miss Stewart; 6-0, 6-4	(Australia) Mabel Lee-Steer		
29 Nov.	French Covered Court Championships; Paris, France; Wood (i)	(France) Adine Masson; 7-5, 6-4	(United Kingdom) Phoebe Riseley Hausburg		

=== December ===
Ended	Tournament	Winner	Finalist	Semifinalist	Quarterfinalist
29 Dec.	Southern California Midwinter Invitation; Riverside, United States; Hard	(United States) Marion Jones (2); 3-0 sets	(United States) Grace Gilliland		
30 Dec.	New Zealand Championships; Nelson, New Zealand; Grass	(New Zealand) Kate Nunneley (2); 6-1, 6-0	(New Zealand) Miss Kennedy		

== Tournament winners ==
Players are listed by most titles won, major tournaments are in bold.

- (United Kingdom) Blanche Hillyard, Brighton, Buxton, Eastbourne, Monte Carlo II, Newcastle, (5)
- (United Kingdom) Charlotte Cooper, Bristol, Chiswick Park, West Kensington II, **Wimbledon Championships**, (4)
- (United States) Elisabeth Moore, Livingston, Montrose, Ridgewood, **U.S. National Championships**, (4)
- (United Kingdom) Elsie Lane, Baden-Baden, Burton-on-Trent, Homburg, (3)
- (United States) Juliette Atkinson, Niagara-on-the-Lake, Niagara-on-the-Lake II, Toronto, (3)
- (Scotland) Lottie Paterson, Boulogne-sur-Mer, Moffat, Wemyss Bay, (3)
- (United Kingdom) Katherine Booth, Monte Carlo, Nice II, (2)
- (Wales) Edith Austin, Beckenham, West Kensington, (2)
- (Ireland) Louisa Martin, **Irish Championships**, **Northern Championships**, (2)
- (Australia) Kate Nunneley, Nelson, Sydney, (2)
- (United Kingdom) Alice Pickering, Leamington Spa, Llandudno, (2)
- (United States) Mabel Ferris, Poughkeepsie, Tarrytown, (2)
- (United Kingdom) Emma Ridding, Felixstowe, Stroud, (2)
- (Netherlands) Anthonie van Aken, Scheveningen, The Hague, (2)
- (United States) Marion Jones, Riverside, Santa Monica, (2)
- (United Kingdom) Ivy Arbuthnot, Dinard, Saint-Servan-sur-Mer, (2)

48 other players won a single title each (1).

== Sources ==
- British Newspaper Archive
- Google News Archive
- Papers Past
- Trove - National Library of Australia (NLA)
