= 1892 women's tennis season =

Women's tennis tournament series

1892 Women's Tennis Season
Details
- Duration: 15 February - 29 December
- Edition: 17th
- Tournaments: 70

Achievements (singles)
- Most titles: (United Kingdom) Maud Shackle (6)
- Most finals: (United Kingdom) Maud Shackle (7)

The 1892 Women's Tennis Season was a worldwide circuit of 70 major, national, regional, provincial, state, county, metropolitan, city, town and regular tennis tournaments.

The season began on 15 February in Riverside, California in the United States and ended on 29 December in Dunedin in New Zealand.

== Season summary ==
The 1892 women's tennis season began on 15 February with the Southern California Midwinter Invitation held in Riverside, California in the United States the singles title was won by Grace Gilliland who defeated a Miss Wilkes in the final in straight sets the event was played on cement courts.

At the end of May at the first major tournament of the season the Irish Championships played at the Fitzwilliam LTC, Dublin, in Ireland, Irish player Louisa Martin wins the singles title against England's Gertrude Crofton in straight sets.

In mid June at the second major tournament of the year the Northern Championships held in Liverpool, England, England's Lottie Dod defeats Irish champion Louisa Martin in the all-comers final, then in the challenge round the holder Florence Stanuell concedes a walkover to Dod who wins the championship.

At the end of June at the third major event of the season, the 1892 U.S. National Championships held in Philadelphia, in United States the defending champion from Ireland Mabel Cahill wins a second consecutive title against the American player Elisabeth Moore.

During the first week of July, the fourth and final major tournament of the season is held the 1892 Wimbledon Championships Lottie Dod wins a fourth Wimbledon title, and second major title of the year against Blanche Hillyard in straight sets.

The season ends on 29 December in Dunedin, New Zealand with the staging of the New Zealand Championships the singles event is won by Isabel Rees who defeats Ruth Orbell in the final..

== Season results ==
Key

Major events
National events
Professional events
Worldwide events

=== January ===
No events

=== February ===
Ended	Tournament	Winner	Finalist	Semifinalist	Quarterfinalist
20 Feb.	Southern California Midwinter Invitation; Riverside, United States; Cement	(United States) Grace Gilliland; 6-2, 6-1	(United States) Miss Wilkes		

=== March ===
Ended	Tournament	Winner	Finalist	Semifinalist	Quarterfinalist
1 Mar.	Auckland Championships; Auckland, New Zealand; Grass	(New Zealand) F. Spiers; 6-3, 3-6, 6-1	(New Zealand) Miss Gorrie		
5 Mar.	Otago Championships; Dunedin II, New Zealand; Grass	(New Zealand) L. Mackkeras; 8-5 games	(Colony of Natal) Mabel Grant		
19 Mar.	South Australian Championships; Adelaide, Australia; Grass	(Australia) Maisie Parks; 11-9 games	(Australia) E. Goldsmith		

=== April ===
Ended	Tournament	Winner	Finalist	Semifinalist	Quarterfinalist
2 Apr.	British Covered Court Championships; West Kensington, Great Britain; Wood (i)	(United Kingdom) Maud Shackle; 6-3, 3-6, 6-2	(United Kingdom) May Arbuthnot		
21 Apr.	South African Championships; Port Elizabeth, South Africa; Clay	(Colony of Natal) Mabel Grant def.	(Cape Colony) Mrs McLagan		

=== May ===
Ended	Tournament	Winner	Finalist	Semifinalist	Quarterfinalist
14 May.	New South Wales Championships; Sydney, Australia; Grass	(Australia) Mabel Shaw; 7-5, 3-6, 6-4	(Australia) S. Dransfield		
25 May.	Hawaiian Islands Championships; Honolulu, Hawaii; Clay	(Hawaiian Kingdom) F. Mollie Atkinson; 6-2, 6-1	(Hawaiian Kingdom) May Atkinson		
28 May.	Irish Championships; Dublin; Ireland; Grass	(Ireland) Louisa Martin; 6-1, 6-0	(United Kingdom) Gertrude Crofton		

=== June ===
Ended	Tournament	Winner	Finalist	Semifinalist	Quarterfinalist
10 Jun.	Welsh Championships; Penarth, Great Britain; Grass	(Wales) Mary Sweet-Escott; 2-6, 6-3, 6-2	(Wales) Louisa Sweet-Escott		
11 Jun.	Cheltenham Championships; Cheltenham, Great Britain; Grasd	(United Kingdom) Mary Agg; 6-0, 6-4	(United Kingdom) Florence Mardall		
15 Jun.	Scottish Championships; Edinburgh, Great Britain; Grass	(United Kingdom) Helen Jackson; 7-5, 6-1	(Scotland) Lottie Paterson		
16 Jun.	New Jersey State Championships; Montrose II, United States; Grass	(Ireland) Mabel Cahill won. ?			
16 Jun.	Ealing Championships; Ealing, Great Britain; Grass	(United Kingdom) Charlotte Cooper; 6-4, 4-6, 7-5	(Wales) Edith Austin		
18 Jun.	Northern Championships; Liverpool, Great Britain; Grass	(United Kingdom) Lottie Dod walkover	(Ireland) Florence Stanuell		
25 Jun.	Kent All-Comers' Championships; Beckenham, Great Britain; Grass	(United Kingdom) Maud Shackle (2); 6-3, 6-1	(United Kingdom) May Jacks		
25 Jun.	Yorkshire LTA Championships; Hull, Great Britain; Grass	(United Kingdom) Helen Jackson (2); 6-0, retd.	(United Kingdom) Beatrice Draffen		
25 Jun.	U.S. National Championships; Philadelphia, United States; Grass	(Ireland) Mabel Cahill (2); 5-7, 6-3, 6-4, 4-6, 6-2	(United States) Elisabeth Moore		

=== July ===
Ended	Tournament	Winner	Finalist	Semifinalist	Quarterfinalist
2 Jul.	Middle States Championships; Montrose, United States; Grass	(Ireland) Mabel Cahill (3); 6-1, 6-1	(United States) Augusta Schultz		
7 Jul.	Wimbledon Championships; Wimbledon, Great Britain; Grass	(United Kingdom) Lottie Dod (2); 6-1, 6-1	(United Kingdom) Blanche Hillyard		
9 Jul.	Championship of the Coast; Redondo Beach, United States; Asphalt	(United States) Grace Gilliland (2); 6-4, 3-6, 6-4	(United States) Fannie Shoemaker		
13 Jul.	Burton-on-Trent Open; Burton-on-Trent, Great Britain; Grass	(United Kingdom) Miss King; 6-1, 6-1	(United Kingdom) Miss Hodson		
15 Jul.	Queen's Ladies Cup; West Kensington III, Great Britain; Grass	(United Kingdom) Maud Shackle (4); 6-4, 6-3	(United Kingdom) Beatrice Draffen		
15 Jul.	Natal Championships; Durban, South Africa; Clay	(Colony of Natal) Mabel Grant (2); 6-1, 6-2	(Colony of Natal) Norah Hickman		
16 Jul.	London Championships; West Kensington II, Great Britain; Grass	(United Kingdom) Maud Shackle (3); 6-2, 6-3	(Wales) Edith Austin		
16 Jul.	Nottinghamshire Open; Nottingham, Great Britain; Grass	(United Kingdom) Miss Goodman; 6-2, 7-5	(United Kingdom) Miss Evans		
20 Jul.	Warwickshire Championships (Note: The 11th Royal Leamington Spa Tournament featured the Warwickshire Championships.); Leamington, Great Britain; Grass	(United Kingdom) Henrietta Horncastle; 6-2, 6-2	(United Kingdom) Miss Goodman		
23 Jul.	Edgbaston Open; Edgbaston II, Great Britain; Gŕass	(United Kingdom) Winifred Longhurst divided title	(United Kingdom) Edith Longhurst		
23 Jul.	South Yarra Electric Light Tournament; South Yarra, Australia; Canvas (i)	(Australia) Mrs B. Gray; 6-3, 6-2	(Australia) Miss A. Malony		
23 Jul.	Middlesex Championships; Chiswick Park, Great Britain; Grass	(United Kingdom) Maud Shackle (5); 6-4, 6-0	(Wales) Edith Austin		
28 July.	Canadian Championships; Toronto, Canada; Grass	(Canada) Maude Delano-Osborne; 9-7, 7-9, 6-2, 8-6	(Canada) Mrs Sidney Smith		
29 Jul.	Northampton Open (Note: Northampton Open: The mens event was titled as the Championship of Northants and Beds.); Northampton, Great Britain; Grass	(United Kingdom) Kate Nunneley; 6-2, 6-8, 6-2	(United Kingdom) Miss Friend		
30 Jul.	Northumberland Championships; Newcastle, Great Britain; Grass	(United Kingdom) Jane Corder; 2-6, 9-7, 6-4	(United Kingdom) Helen Jackson		
30 Jul.	Surrey Championships; Surbiton, Great Britain; Grass	(United Kingdom) May Arbuthnot; 6-3, 6-1	(United Kingdom) Ivy Arbuthnot		
30 Jul.	Bedford Open; Bedford, Great Britain; Grass	(Scotland) Evelyn Blencowe; 6-3, 6-2	(United Kingdom) Henrietta Horncastle		

=== August ===
Ended	Tournament	Winner	Finalist	Semifinalist	Quarterfinalist
4 Aug.	Darlington Open; Darlington, Great Britain; Grass	(United Kingdom) Mary Puttnam default	(United Kingdom) Jane Corder		
5 Aug.	North of Wales Open (Note: The Pensarn Abergele Tournament featured the North of Wales Open event.); Abergele, Great Britain; Grass	(United Kingdom) Letitia Brown def.	(United Kingdom) Margaret Tulley		
6 Aug.	Exmouth Open; Exmouth, Great Britain; Grass	(Ireland) Lilian Pine-Coffin; 8-6, 4-6, 6-2	(United Kingdom) Constance Bryan		
6 Aug.	Tacoma Open; Tacoma, United States; Clay	(United States) Bessie Anderson def.	(United States) Mrs F. Snow		
6 Aug.	Isle of Man Championship (Note: The Isle of Man Open Tennis Tournament featured the Championship of the Isle Man.); Castletown, IOM; Grass	(Isle of Man) Nelly Darrah; 6-3, 6-0	(Isle of Man) Miss Moore-Lane		
8 Aug.	Sheffield & Hallamshire Tournament; Sheffield, Great Britain; Grass	(United Kingdom) Miss Crosby; 6-2, 6-2	(United Kingdom) Winnifred Kersey		
9 Aug.	Maritime Provinces Championships; Halifax, Canada; Clay	(Canada) Miss MacLaren def. ?	(Canada) Miss Reader		
11 Aug.	Scheveningen International; Scheveningen, Netherlands; Cement	(Netherlands) E. van Aken; 6-3, 6-3	(United Kingdom) Mrs Ottley		
12 Aug.	North Wales Championships; Criccieth, Great Britain; Grass	(United Kingdom) Helen Jackson (3); 6-4, 6-1	(Wales) Miss Moore		
13 Aug.	Queensland Championships; Brisbane, Australia; Grass	(Australia) Miss MacGregor walkover	(Australia) Miss Lee		
13 Aug.	Derbyshire Championships; Buxton, Great Britain; Grass	(United Kingdom) Helen Jackson (4); 6-2, 6-1	(United Kingdom) Miss Vicars		
22 Aug.	North of England Championships; Scarborough, Great Britain; Grass	(United Kingdom) Beatrice Draffen; 6-4, 7-5	(United Kingdom) Kate Nunneley		
23 Aug.	Singapore LLTC Summer Open; Singapore, Straits Settlements; Grass	(Singapore) Mrs Salzmann; 6-0, 1-6, 6-5	(Singapore) Mrs Bentley		
23 Aug.	Catskill Mountains Championship; Shandaken, United States; Clay	(United States) Beatrice Stratton; 7-5, 6-4, 6-3	(United States) Alice Stratton		
23 Aug.	Ontario Championships; Hamilton, Canada; Grass	(Canada) Mrs Sidney Smith def. ?	(Canada) Miss Faulkner		
23 Aug.	Hilversum International Invitation; Hilversum, Netherlands; Cement	(Netherlands) J. Viruly; 6-5, 1-6, 6-5	(Netherlands) M. Viruly		
25 Aug.	Falmouth Open; Falmouth, Great Britain; Great Britain	(United Kingdom) Mary Foster def. ?	(United Kingdom) Irene Foster		
27 Aug.	East of Scotland Championships; St. Andrews, Great Britain; Grass	(United Kingdom) Jane Corder (2); 6-1, 3-6, 6-2	(Scotland) Miss Moir		
27 Aug.	Bournemouth Open; Bournemouth, Great Britain; Grass	(United Kingdom) Violet Pinckney default	(United Kingdom) Charlotte Cooper		
27 Aug.	Tournoi LTC de Dieppe; Dieppe, France; Clay	(United Kingdom) Miss Parker; 6-3, 6-4	(United Kingdom) Miss Wombwell		
27 Aug.	Gore Court Championships; Sittingbourne, Great Britain; Grass	(United Kingdom) Alice Malden; 6-2, 7-5	(United Kingdom) Henrietta Horncastle		
30 Aug.	Southern California Championships; Santa Monica, United States; Asphalt	(United States) Grace Gilliland (3); 5-6, 6-2, 6-2	(United States) May Carter		
31 Aug.	British Columbia Championships; Victoria, Canada; Grass	(Canada) Anastasia Musgrave; 6-3, 5-7, 7-5	(Canada) Frances Arrowsmith		

=== September ===
Ended	Tournament	Winner	Finalist	Semifinalist	Quarterfinalist
2 Sep.	North of Scotland Championships (Note: The Elgin Tournament featured the North of Scotland Championship event.); Elgin, Great Britain; Clay	(Scotland) Edith Morgan; 2-6, 6-4, 8-6	(Scotland) Lottie Paterson		
2 Sep.	Niagara International Championship; Niagra-on-the-Lake, Canada; Grass	(Canada) Maud Delano Osborne (2) def.	(Canada) Miss MacLaren		
5 Sep.	Sussex Championships; Brighton, Great Britain; Grass	(United Kingdom) Maud Shackle (6); 6-0, 8-6	(United Kingdom) Bertha Steedman		
10 Sep.	Pacific Coast Championships; Oakland, United States; Asphalt	(United States) Susan D. Morgan; 6-1, 6-2	(United States) Elizabeth Chew		
11 Sep.	East End Park Open; Pittsburgh, United States; Asphalt	(United States) Miss Voight; 6-3, 2-6, 6-4	(United States) Miss Gill		
14 Sep.	South of England Championships; Eastbourne, Great Britain; Grass	(United Kingdom) Blanche Hillyard; 6-1, 6-4	(United Kingdom) Bertha Steedman		
18 Sep.	Boulogne International Championship; Boulogne-sur-Mer, France; Clay	(United Kingdom) Hilda Froome; 6-0, 6-3, 6-2	(United Kingdom) Miss Bigwood		
18 Sep.	Pittsburgh TC Open; Pittsburgh II, United States; Grass	(United States) Laura Potter; 6-4, 3-6, 7-5	(United States) Miss Chambers		

=== October ===
Ended	Tournament	Winner	Finalist	Semifinalist	Quarterfinalist
2 Oct.	Staten Island Open; Livingston, United States; Grass	(United States) Ellen Roosevelt; 6-4, 5-7, 7-5, 6-3	(United States) Annie Burdette		
11 Oct.	Strathfield Open; Sydney II, Australia; Asphalt	(Australia) C. Dransfield; 6-2, 6-3	(Australia) A. C. Lloyd		

=== November ===
Ended	Tournament	Winner	Finalist	Semifinalist	Quarterfinalist
26 Nov.	Victorian Championships; Melbourne, Australia; Asphalt	(Australia) Edith Raleigh; 1-6, 6-3, 6-2	(Australia) Ellen Mayne		

=== December ===
Ended	Tournament	Winner	Finalist	Semifinalist	Quarterfinalist
17 Dec.	Transvaal Championships; Johannesburg, South Africa; Clay	(Transvaal Colony) Margaret Tudhope; 6-3, 6-3	(Transvaal Colony) Miss Murray		
29 Dec.	New Zealand Championships; Dunedin, New Zealand; Grass	(New Zealand) Isabel Rees; 6-4, 6-5	(New Zealand) Ruth Orbell		

== Tournament winners ==
Players are listed by total titles won, major tournaments are in bold.

- (United Kingdom) Maud Shackle, Beckenham, Brighton, Chiswick Park, West Kensington, West Kensington II, West Kensington III, (6)
- (United Kingdom) Helen Jackson, Buxton, Criccieth, Edinburgh, Hull, (4)
- (Ireland) Mabel Cahill, Montrose, Montrose II, **U.S. National Championships** (3)
- (United States) Grace Gilliland, Redondo Beach, Riverside, Santa Monica, (3)
- (United Kingdom) Jane Corder, Newcastle-upon-Tyne, St.Andrews, (2)
- (United Kingdom) Lottie Dod, **Northern Championships**, **Wimbledon Championships**, (2)
- (Canada) Maude Delano-Osborne, Niagra-on-the-Lake, Toronto, (2)
- (Australia) Nina Rock. Hobart, Launceston, (2)
- (Colony of Natal) Mabel Grant, Durban, Port Elizabeth, (2)
- (Ireland) Louisa Martin, **Irish Championships** (1)

46 other players won 1 title each.

== Season statistics ==
Category	Player	Result/Count
Most Singles Titles	(United Kingdom) Maud Shackle	6
Most Singles Finals	(United Kingdom) Maud Shackle	7
Most Singles Matches Played	(United Kingdom) Maud Shackle	29
Most Singles Matches Won	(United Kingdom) Maud Shackle	24
Best Win-Loss Record	(United Kingdom) Lottie Dod	11–1 (91.7%)
Second Best Win-Loss Record	(United Kingdom) Maud Shackle	24–5 (82.8%)

== See also ==
- 1892 men's tennis season
