= Rothesay Hard Court Open =

Defunct tennis tournament
- Founded: 1885
- Abolished: 1887
- Editions: 3
- Location: Rothesay, Isle of Bute, Argyll and Bute, Scotland
- Venue: Craigmore Lawn Tennis Club Grounds
- Surface: Asphalt

The Rothesay Hard Court Open was a late Victorian era hard asphalt court tennis tournament first staged in 1885 as the Rothesay Lawn Tennis Tournament. at the Craigmore Grounds, Rothesay, Isle of Bute, Argyll and Bute, Scotland which ran until 1887.

== History ==
The Rothesay Tournament was a hard court (asphalt) tennis tournament first staged in 1885 at the Craigmore Lawm Tennis Club Grounds, Rothesay, Isle of Bute, Argyll and Bute, Scotland which ran until 1887.

== Finals ==
Included:

=== Men's Singles ===
- 1885— (Scotland) Lyle McLachlan def. (Scotland) B.H. Harris, 6–4, 6–3, 3–6, 6-3
- 1886— (United Kingdom) Anderson Steel def. (United Kingdom) Charles H. J. Higginbotham, 7–5, 6–2, 9-7
- 1887— (Ireland) James E. Lefroy Stein def. (United Kingdom) J. Adam, 7–5, 6–1

=== Men's Doubles ===
- 1885— (United Kingdom) Anderson Steel & (Scotland) Dudley Stuart def. (Scotland) M. Douglas & (Scotland) Mr. Alexander, 6–2, 6–1, 6–3
- 1886— (United Kingdom) Anderson Steel & (Scotland) Dudley Stuart def. (United Kingdom) J.A. Jackson & (Scotland) Mr. Shand, 4–6, 6–3, 6–3, 6–3

=== Women's Singles ===
- 1885— (Scotland) Lottie Paterson def. (England) Jane Corder, 6-4, 3-6, 6–2

=== Mixed Doubles ===
- 1885— (United Kingdom) Anderson Steel & (Scotland) Miss Campbell def. (England) Mr. Berry & (England) Mrs Berry, 6–0, 6-4
- 1886— (United Kingdom) Anderson Steel & (Scotland) Lottie Paterson def. (United Kingdom) A.S. Myrtle & (England) Miss Brown, 6–0, 6–0
