= Patrick Durlacher =

English cricketer

Personal information
- Full name: Patrick Neville Durlacher
- Born: 17 March 1903; Paddington, London, England
- Died: 26 February 1971 (aged 67); Ireland
- Batting: Right-handed

Domestic team information
- Years: Team
- 1921–1923: Middlesex
- 1920: Buckinghamshire

Career statistics
Competition	First-class
Matches	5
Runs scored	43
Batting average	10.75
100s/50s	–/–
Top score	27
Balls bowled	–
Wickets	–
Bowling average	–
5 wickets in innings	–
10 wickets in match	–
Best bowling	–
Catches/stumpings	3/–
- Source: Cricinfo, 25 May 2011

Patrick Neville Durlacher (17 March 1903 – 26 February 1971) was an English cricketer. Durlacher was a right-handed batsman. He was born in Paddington, London, the son of Neville Durlacher and his Irish-born wife Ruth Dyas. He was educated at Wellington College, where he represented the school cricket team. It was for the college that he was part of the Wellington Rackets pair who won the Public Schools Championship in 1921.

He played for Buckinghamshire in the Minor Counties Championship in 1920, which turned out to be a successful season for him, which paved the way for him to make his first-class debut for Middlesex the following season.

His first-class debut came against Somerset in 1921, although he was an infrequent fixture in the Middlesex side, playing just 4 further matches up till 1923. In his 5 first-class appearances, he scored 43 runs at a batting average of 10.75, with a high score of 27.

He later studied at Cambridge University, despite not representing the University in cricket, Durlacher nevertheless won a Cambridge Blue in cross country running.

In 1935, Durlacher was listed in the London Gazette as living in Stoke Green, Buckinghamshire and making a claim to his late father's estate. His sister, Nora Durlacher, was a tennis player who appeared in the 1919 Irish Lawn Tennis Championships doubles. Durlacher died suddenly while fishing in Ireland on 26 February 1971.
