= Welsh Covered Court Championships =

Defunct tennis tournament
- Tour: Pre-open era (1877-1967)
- Founded: 1893
- Abolished: 1955
- Editions: 51
- Location: Llandudno, Wales
- Venue: Craigside Hydro Badmington and Tennis Club
- Surface: Wood (indoor)

The Welsh Covered Court Championships its original name also called Welsh Covered Court Lawn Tennis Championships was a tennis event held from 1893 through 1955 in Wales, United Kingdom.

== History ==
The Welsh Covered Court Championships was played at the Craigside Hydro Badmington and Tennis Club on indoor courts, the club also had outdoor courts, Llandudno, Wales.

== Finals ==
Notes: Challenge round: The final round of a tournament, in which the winner of a single-elimination phase faces the previous year's champion, who plays only that one match. The challenge round was used in the early history of tennis (from 1877 through 1921) in some tournaments not all. (c) indicates challenger

=== Men's singles ===
Year	Champions	Runners-up	Score
1893	(United Kingdom) James Herbert Crispe	(United Kingdom) Tancred D. Cummins	6–2, 6–4, 6–2
1894	(Wales) William S. N. Heard	(United Kingdom) James Herbert Crispe (c)	6–1, 3–6, 2–6, 6–4, 6–1
1895	(England) Reginald Doherty	(Wales) William S. N. Heard (c)	walkover
1896	(England) Laurence Doherty	(England) George Simond (c)	6-0 6-0
1897	(England) Reginald Doherty (2)	(England) Laurence Doherty (c) (2)	walkover
1898	(Ireland) Harold Mahony	(England) Laurence Doherty (c) (3)	5–7, 6–4, 7–5, 6–4
1899	(United Kingdom) George Caridia	(Ireland) Harold Mahony (c)	walkover
1900	(United Kingdom) George Caridia(2)	(United Kingdom) Reginald Doherty (c)	4–6, 6–4, 6–4, 6–8, 6–3
1901	(United Kingdom) George Caridia(3)	(England) Robert Baldwin Hough (c)	walkover
1902	(United Kingdom) George Caridia (4)	(England) Robert Baldwin Hough (c)	6–2, 6–3, 6–1
1903	(England) Robert Baldwin Hough	(United Kingdom) George Caridia	6–0, 3–6, 6–4, 6–3
1904	(United Kingdom) George Caridia (5)	(United Kingdom) Evelyn J. Mellor	6–2, 6–3, 6–1
1905	(England) Theodore Mavrogordato	(England) Robert Baldwin Hough	(title shared)
1906	(United Kingdom) George Caridia(6)	(United States) Wylie Cameron Grant	6–1, 2–6, 6–1, 6–4
1907	(United Kingdom) George Caridia (7)	(United Kingdom) A. L. Bentley	6–3, 7–5, 6–0
1908	(United Kingdom) George Caridia (8)	(Scotland) Robin Welsh	6–2, 6–0, 6–1
1909	(United Kingdom) George Caridia (9)	(England) Theodore Mavrogordato	6–1, 6–3, 4–6, 3–6, 6–3
1910	(England) Theodore Mavrogordato (2)	(United Kingdom) George Caridia	6-4, 4-6, 6-3, 6-0
1911	(England) Theodore Mavrogordato (3)	(United Kingdom) George Caridia	6–1, 7–5, 6–1
1912	(England) Theodore Mavrogordato (4)	(Australia) Stanley Doust	6–2, 5–7, 7–5, 7–5
1913	(England) Theodore Mavrogordato (5)	(United Kingdom) Gordon Lowe	7–5, 8–10, 8–6, 6–3
1915/1918	Not held (due to World War I)		
1919	(United States) Arthur M. Lovibond	(United Kingdom) H. S. Milford	6–1, 6–2, 6–1
1920	(United States) Arthur M. Lovibond (2)	(United Kingdom) George Caridia	3–6, 6–2, 6–4, 7–5
1921	(India) Mohammed Sleem	(United Kingdom) Walter Crawley	6–1, 7-9, 7–5 retired
1922	(United Kingdom) George Alan Thomas	(France) L. West	6–4, 6–1, 6–1
1923	(United Kingdom) George Alan Thomas (2)	(Republic of Ireland) William G. Ireland	6–1, 6–2, 6–4
1924	(United Kingdom) H. V. Mander	(United Kingdom) Douglas R. Watson	4–6, 6–1, 6–3
1925	(United Kingdom) George Alan Thomas (3)	(Republic of Ireland) William G. Ireland	6–1, 6–2, 6–4
1926	(United Kingdom) George Alan Thomas (4)	(United Kingdom) Douglas R. Watson	6–2, 6–2, 8–6
1927	(United Kingdom) George Alan Thomas (5)	(United Kingdom) Douglas R. Watson	4–6, 6–1, 7–5, 5–7, 8–6
1928	(India) Hassan-Ali Fyzee	(Republic of Ireland) William G. Ireland	8–6, 5–7, 6–2
1929	(United States) V. Allman-Smith	(India) Hassan-Ali Fyzee	6–3, 3–6, 6–2
1930	(Netherlands) Hendrik Timmer	(Republic of Ireland) D. O. Hobbis	6–4, 6–0, 7–5
1931	(India) Hassan-Ali Fyzee (2)	(United Kingdom) William D. Radcliffe	6–4, 6–3
1933	(United Kingdom) Clarence Medlycott Jones	(United Kingdom) S. N. Grossman	6–2, 6–3
1934	(Republic of Ireland) George Lyttleton-Rogers	(United Kingdom) Nigel Sharpe	7–5, 10-8
1935	(United Kingdom) Frank Wilde	(United Kingdom) Claude Lister	7–5, 6–1, 6–3
1937	(United Kingdom) Frank Wilde (2)	(United Kingdom) Henry Billington	6–3, 6–2
1938	(United Kingdom) Henry Billington	(United Kingdom) J. R. Briggs	6–3, 6–3, 6–2
1939/1949	Not held (due to World War II)		
1950	(Poland) Ignacy Tłoczyński	(United Kingdom) Henry Billington	2–6, 6–0, 6–2, 6–4
1951	(United Kingdom) A. Dawes	(United Kingdom) W. D. Hughes	6–8, 6–1 6–3, 7–5
1952	(United Kingdom) Billy Knight	(United Kingdom) Ivor Warwick	6–1, 6–2, 6–1
1953	(United Kingdom) John Barrett	(Southern Rhodesia) Donald Black	6–1, 6–3, 8–10, 1–6, 9–7
1954	(United Kingdom) Tony Pickard	(United Kingdom) Ivor Warwick	6–3, 6–0, 3–6, 6–3
1955	(United Kingdom) Ivor Warwick	(United Kingdom) Alan Mills	6–3, 8–6, 6–3

=== Women's singles ===
- Notes: The women's tournaments of 1894 and 1895 were played twice yearly in * April and ** October. The April editions were called the Welsh Covered Court Spring Championships.

Year	Champions	Runners-up	Score
1894	(United Kingdom) Alice Pickering	(United Kingdom) Margaret Broadhurst Dickins (c)	6–3, 6–3 *
1894	(United Kingdom) Margaret Broadhurst Dickins	(United Kingdom) Ellen Cressy (c)	1–6, 6–4, 6–4 **
1895	(United Kingdom) Alice Pickering (2)	(Ireland) Ruth Dyas (c)	7–5, 6–3 *
1895	(United Kingdom) Alice Pickering (3)	(United Kingdom) Ida Cressy (c)	6–0, 6–4 **
1896	(United Kingdom) Alice Pickering (4)	(United Kingdom) Henrica Ridding (c)	6–1, 7–5
1897	(Ireland) Ruth Dyas	(United Kingdom) Alice Pickering (c)	4–6, 6–3, 6–4
1898	(Ireland) Ruth Dyas (2)	(England) Muriel Robb (c)	1–6, 7–5, 11-9
1899	(England) Muriel Robb (c)	(Ireland) Ruth Dyas Durlacher	6–2, 6–3
1900	(England) Muriel Robb (2)	(United Kingdom) Elizabeth Lunt Heatley (c)	6–0, 6–1
1901	(England) Muriel Robb (3)	(United Kingdom) Elizabeth Lunt Heatley (c)	6–1, 6–2
1902	(United Kingdom) L. Clarke	(United Kingdom) Elizabeth Lunt Heatley (c)	7–5, 7–5
1903	(United Kingdom) Maude Garfit	(Scotland) Mary Gray Curtis-Whyte	6–2, 6–0
1904	(United Kingdom) Violet Pinckney	(United Kingdom) Mabel Squire	6–3, 6–4
1905	(United Kingdom) Mabel Squire	(United Kingdom) Elizabeth Lunt Heatley	10-8, 7–5
1906	(Scotland) Mary Curtis-Whyte	(United Kingdom) Miss Butler Lloyd	6–2, 8–6
1907	(United Kingdom) Gladys Eastlake-Smith	(Scotland) Mary Gray Curtis-Whyte	6–1, 6–2
1908	(United Kingdom) E. Bosworth	(Scotland) Mary Gray Curtis-Whyte	6–1, 7–5
1909	(United Kingdom) Mabel Squire Parton (2)	(Scotland) Mary Gray Welsh	6–2, 4–6, 6–2
1910	(United Kingdom) Mabel Squire Parton (3)	(United Kingdom) Mrs Williams-Vaughan	6–0, 6–3
1911	(United Kingdom) Mabel Squire Parton (4)	(United Kingdom) Ethel Thomson Larcombe	9–7, 7–5
1912	(United Kingdom) Mabel Squire Parton (5)	(United Kingdom) Mrs Perrett	6–3, 5–7, 6–4
1913	(Scotland) Mary Gray Welsh	(United Kingdom) Beatrice Lee	6–0, 6–0
1915/1918	Not held (due to World War I)		
1919	(United Kingdom) Phyllis Satterthwaite	(United Kingdom) Ms. Pridmore	6–0, 6–2
1920	(United Kingdom) Phyllis Satterthwaite (2)	(United Kingdom) Mrs A. Hall	6–1, 6–0
1921	(United Kingdom) Phyllis Satterthwaite (3)	(United Kingdom) Dorothy Kemmis-Betty	6–3, 3–6, 6–3
1922	(Scotland) Mary Gray Welsh	(United Kingdom) Mrs Forster	6–0, 6–1
1923	(United Kingdom) Phyllis Howkins Covell	(United Kingdom) Irene Maltby	6–3, 6–3
1924	(United Kingdom) Marie Hazel	(Scotland) Mary Gray Welsh	2–6, 12–10, 6–1
1925	(United Kingdom) Irene Maltby	(United Kingdom) Marie Hazel	10–8, 6–2
1926	(United Kingdom) Dorothy Kemmis-Betty Hill	(United Kingdom) Irene Maltby	6–4, 1–6, 8–6
1927	(United Kingdom) Dorothy Kemmis-Betty Hill (2)	(United Kingdom) Irene Maltby	6–4, 6–1
1928	(United Kingdom) Naomi Trentham	(United Kingdom) Peggy Ingram Bouverie	6–2, 8–6
1929	(United Kingdom) Joan Ridley	(United Kingdom) Dorothy Kemmis-Betty Hill	8–6, 6–4
1930	(United Kingdom) Freda James	(United Kingdom) Ida Howitt	6–1, 6–0
1931	(United Kingdom) Marjory 'Mie' Johnstone	(United Kingdom) N. Case	6–1, 6–3
1932	(United Kingdom) Marjory 'Mie' Johnstone (2)	(United Kingdom) N. Case	1–6, 7–5, 6–3
1933	(United Kingdom) Jeanette Morfey	(United Kingdom) Dora Beazley	6–3, 10–8
1934	(South Africa) Dulcie Kitson	(United Kingdom) Barbara Drew	7–5, 6–2
1935	(United Kingdom) Dora Beazley	(Wales) Jackie McAlpine Brutton	6–3, 7–5
1936	(United Kingdom) Denise Huntbach	(United Kingdom) Valerie Scott	6–4, 7–9, 6–4
1937	(United Kingdom) Denise Huntbach (2)	(United Kingdom) Dora Beazley	5–7, 6–1, 6–3
1938	(United Kingdom) Freda James Hammersley	(United Kingdom) Dora Beazley	6–3, 6–2
1939/1949	Not held (due to World War II and after)		
1950	(United Kingdom) Georgie Woodgate	(United Kingdom) Susan Partridge	6–2, 6–3
1951	(United Kingdom) Molly Stone	(United Kingdom) Rita Bentley	6–4, 7–5
1952	(United Kingdom) Joan MacLeod	(United Kingdom) Molly Stone	6–3, 6–3
1953	(United Kingdom) Helen Fletcher	(United Kingdom) Shirley Bloomer	2–6, 6–3, 6–0
1954	(United Kingdom) Shirley Bloomer	(United Kingdom) Pat Harrison	6–2, 7–5
1955	(United Kingdom) Elaine Watson	(United Kingdom) Marian Craig-Smith	7–5, 7–5

== See also ==
- Tennis Wales

== Sources ==
- Ayre's Lawn Tennis Almanack And Tournament Guide, A. Wallis Myers. UK.
- Dunlop Lawn Tennis Almanack and Tournament Guide, G.P. Hughes, 1939 to 1958, Published by Dunlop Sports Co. Ltd, UK.
- Lawn Tennis and Badminton Magazines, 1896–1901, Amateur Sports Publishing Co. Ltd, London, UK.
- Lawn Tennis and Croquet Magazines, 1901–1920, Amateur Sports Publishing Co. Ltd, London, UK.
- Lowe's Lawn Tennis Annuals and Compendia, Lowe, Sir F. Gordon, Eyre & Spottiswoode, London, UK.
