= Trefriw Open =

Defunct tennis tournament
- Founded: 1889
- Abolished: 1903
- Location: Trefriw, Caernarfonshire; Wales
- Venue: Conway Valley Grounds
- Surface: Grass / outdoor

The Trefriw Open was a combined grass court tennis tournament founded in 1889. The tournament was organised by the Trefriw Improvement Company, and was played at the Conway Valley Grounds in Trefriw, Caernarfonshire, North Wales until 1903.

The winners of the men's open singles event were awarded the Nicholson Challenge Cup.

== Finals ==
=== Men's Singles ===
Included:

Year	Winner	Runner-Up	Score
1889	(United Kingdom) Henry Fosbery	(United Kingdom) Walter Shipman	6–0, 6–1, 6–0
1890	(United Kingdom) Henry Fosbery (2)	(United Kingdom) K.B. Fuller	won.
1894	(United Kingdom) Tancred Cummins	(Wales) William Heard	6–1, 2–6, 3–6, 6–4, 6–4
1895	(United Kingdom) Tancred Cummins (2)	(United Kingdom) Charles Latham	6-3, 6–3, 1–6, 6–3
1896	(United Kingdom) Arnold Wolff	(United Kingdom) Norman Hallward	6-3, 7–5, 3–6, 8–6
1897	(United Kingdom) John Boucher	(Wales) E. H. Powell	6-2, 6–1
1898	(United Kingdom) John Boucher (2)	A. H. Green	5–7, 7–5, 6–2, 6–4
1899	(United Kingdom) John Boucher (3)	(United Kingdom) Frederick Canning	6-0, 6–0, 6–2
1900	(United Kingdom) John Boucher (4)	(United Kingdom) A. H. Green	6-4, 3–6, 6–2, 1–6, 6–4
1901	(United Kingdom) John Boucher (5)	(United Kingdom) Henry Evered	6-4, 6–1, 6–2
1902	(United Kingdom) John Boucher (6)	(United Kingdom) A.H Green	6-4, 6–0, 6–2
1903	(United Kingdom) A.H. Green	(United Kingdom) Frederick Canning	6-0, 6–1, 6–3

=== Women's Singles ===
Year	Winner	Runner-Up	Score
1893	(United Kingdom) Miss Stoneax	(United Kingdom) Mrs Ashwell	6-4, retd.
1895	(Ireland) Ruth Dyas	(Scotland) Miss Murray	4-6 6-3 7–5
1896	(Ireland) Ruth Dyas (2)	(United Kingdom) Constance Hill	6-1 6–0
1897	(Ireland) Ruth Dyas (3)	(United Kingdom) Constance Hill	2-6 6-2 6–2
1898	(Ireland) Ruth Dyas (4)	(United Kingdom) Constance Hill	6-0 6–0
1899	(United Kingdom) E. Makinson	(Ireland) Ruth Durlacher	walkover
