= Helen Jackson (tennis) =

English tennis player

- Country (sports): United Kingdom
- Born: 17 December 1867 Hexham, Northumberland, England England
- Died: 28 May 1940 (aged 72) Lichfield, Staffordshire, England

Grand Slam singles results
- Wimbledon: F (1895^{AC})

Helen Jackson (17 December 1867 - 28 May 1940) was an English tennis player. In the major tournaments of the late 19th century, she was an all-comers singles finalist at both the Northern Championships and Wimbledon Championships in 1895. She was active from 1888 to 1898.

== Career ==
In 1889 she won the Darlington Open In 1891 Jackson competed in the singles event at the Wimbledon Championships for the first time. In the first round she defeated Maud Shackle, but lost in the quarterfinals to Bertha Steedman in two sets. The following year, 1892, she lost in the first round (which was the quarterfinal) to Shackle. Her last entry came in 1895 when she reached the final of the All-comers' event after victories against J.M. Corder, Bernard and Alice Pickering. She lost the final in two close sets to Charlotte Cooper after having led both sets 5–0.

In 1894 she defeated Cooper in the final of the South of England Championships held at the Devonshire Park Lawn Tennis Club, in Eastbourne. That same year she also became the singles champion at the Welsh Championships in Penarth after a straight-sets win in the final against Ethel Cochrane. She lost her title in 1895 after a defeat in a three-sets final to Jane Corder.

1895 was one of Jackson's most successful seasons she won 4 titles that year, and was joint title leader with Charlotte Cooper and Maude Delano-Osborne.

Her other career highlights included winning three consecutive singles titles at the Scottish Championships between 1890 and 1892. the Northumberland Championships four times 1889 to 1891, and 1894. She won the Yorkshire Championships three times consecutively from 1891 to 1893. In addition she also achieved two Derbyshire Championships title wins, in 1892 and 1895.

Jackson won singles titles at the North of England Championships in 1891, the South of England Championships in 1894, and West of England Championships in 1895.

In 1898 she was a finalist at the Championships of Berlin on clay where she lost to Clara von der Schulenburg.

== Personal life ==
On 10 April 1902 she married George James Murray Atkins at the Hexham Abbey in Northumberland.

== Grand Slam finals ==
=== Singles (1 runner-up) ===
| Result | Year | Championship | Surface | Opponent | Score |
|---|---|---|---|---|---|
| Loss | 1895 (Note: The 1895 edition of the All-comer's final is listed because the winner of this final was awarded the singles title in the absence of a challenge round. From 1886 until 1921, the tournament started with a knockout phase, the All Comers' Singles, whose winner then faced the defending champion in a challenge round final. The All Comers' final winner was automatically awarded the title 11 times because the previous year's champion did not defend her title.) | Wimbledon | Grass | (United Kingdom of Great Britain and Ireland) Charlotte Cooper | 5–7, 6–8 |
