= Henrietta Horncastle =

English tennis player (1859 - 1940)

- Country (sports): United Kingdom
- Born: 1859 England
- Died: March 1940 (age 81) Ipswich, England
- Turned pro: 1892 (amateur circuit)
- Retired: 1905

Singles
- Career titles: 7

Grand Slam singles results
- Wimbledon: SF (1896, 1897)

Henrietta Horncastle (1859 – March 1940) (née Henrietta Govey) was an English tennis player during the late 19th century and early 20th century. She was a two time singles semi finalist at the Wimbledon Championships in 1896 and 1897. She was active from 1892 to 1905 and won 7 career singles titles.

== Career ==
She played her first tournament in 1892 at the Bedford Open where she was beaten in the final by Evelyn Blencowe, the same year she won the Warwickshire Championships against a Miss Goodman who had previously won the Nottinghamshire Open.

In 1893 at the Suffolk Championships she reached the final but lost to Elsie Lane, the same year she also reached the finals of the Eastern Counties Championships and again lost to Elsie Lane. She also took part in the Wimbledon Championships for the first time where she reached the quarter finals before losing to Charlotte Cooper.

In 1895 she reached the quarter finals again at the Wimbledon Championships, but lost to Beatrice Draffen. In 1896 she won the Suffolk Championships against Henrica Ridding, the same year she made it the semi finals of the Wimbledon Championships but conceded the match to Edith Austin by a walkover.

In 1897 she reached the semi finals at Wimbledon for the second consecutive year before losing Blanche Hillyard, the same year she won the Essex Championships defeating Ursula Templeman in the final.

In 1898 she won a second Suffolk Championships title against a Miss Bush. The same year she travelled to France to take part in the Championnat international de Boulogne in Boulogne-sur-Mer, and played on clay where she won the title against Florence Gould, she would go on to win that event a further two times in 1900 and 1901 against French player Adine Masson. She retired from tennis in 1905.

== Family ==
She married Walter Radcliffe Horncastle on 19 March 1878 in London, he died 14 January 1908. She died in Ipswich, England in March 1940 age 81.
