= Lake Geneva Championships =

Lake Geneva Championships Championnats du lac Léman

Defunct tennis tournament
- Tour: Swiss Alpine Circuit; ILTF Circuit (1913-38)
- Founded: 1894; 132 years ago
- Abolished: 1938; 88 years ago
- Location: Montreux, Switzerland
- Venue: Montreux Lawn Tennis Club
- Surface: Clay (outdoors)

The Lake Geneva Championships or Championnats du lac Léman was a men's and women's open international clay court tennis tournament founded in 1894 as the Montreux International as part of the Swiss Alpine Circuit. It first staged at the Montreux Lawn Tennis Club, Territet, Montreux, Switzerland. The championships were discontinued in 1938.

== History ==
The transition of elite tennis in the Vaud region during the late 19th century reflects the rapid formalization of the sport in Switzerland. Between 1894 and 1899, the premier event at Montreux underwent a significant identity shift as it grew from a local club meeting into a major international fixture.

The Early Years (1894–1896): Originally contested as the Montreux International, the tournament was the centerpiece of the Montreux Lawn Tennis Club. During this period, it served as a key stop for British and Continental players traveling the "Alpine Circuit."

The Transition (1897–1898): As the event's prestige grew, it began to be referred to increasingly by its geographic region. In 1897, the tournament started incorporating the "Léman" (Lake Geneva) designation in official reporting to distinguish it as the preeminent championship of the lake's Riviera.

Establishment of the Title (1899): By 1899, the event was formally consolidated as the Championnats du lac Léman (Lake Geneva Championships). This rebranding signaled its status as a permanent international championship, moving away from a simple "club international" to a titled regional major.

The Lake Geneva Championships were staged at Grand Hotel Territet Montreux, Switzerland. The championships were usually held in the spring in April or May each year. The tournament continued to be staged through till 1938 when they were discontinued just before the start of World War II.

The tournament sometimes carried the title of the Montreux Grand Hotel Spring Championships or Montreux Spring Meeting or just Montreux Championships in later years. The event was played exclusively at the Montreux Lawn Tennis Club founded in 1890, in the grounds of the Hôtel des Alpes-Grand Hôtel, Territet.

== Past finals ==
=== Men's Singles ===
Year	Champions	Runners-up	Score
1899	(United Kingdom) T.A. Airey	?	?
1903	(Switzerland) Georges Patry	?	?
1906	(United Kingdom) Algernon Kingscote	(United Kingdom) Walter Crawley	6-4, 10-8, 2-6, 6-8, 9-7
1913	(Germany) Otto Froitzheim	(Germany) Friedrich Rahe	6-4, 6-3, 6-4
1916	(Republic of Ireland) Charles Martin	(Russia) Victor de Coubasch	?
1918	(Republic of Ireland) Charles Martin (2)	(Norway) Charles August Sundt	?
1919	(Republic of Ireland) Charles Martin (3)	(Switzerland) Maurice Turrettini	?
1922	(France) Jean Borotra	(Italy) Umberto de Morpurgo	6-2,6-2, 6-4
1923	(Italy) Umberto de Morpurgo	(Denmark) Henning Larsen	6-3, 6-1, 6-8, 8-6
1924	(Italy) Umberto de Morpurgo (2)	(France) Roger Danet	6-2, 6-3, 6-4
1925	(Hungary) Bela Von Kehrling	(Austria) Ludwig von Salm	6-1, 6-2, 6-2
1926	(Germany) Hans Moldenhauer	(Switzerland) Hector Fisher	4-6, 6-1, 6-3, 6-4
1927	(Germany) Hans Moldenhauer (2)	(Switzerland) Hector Fisher	6-1, 6-4, 1-6, 6-2
1928	(Denmark) Erik Worm	(France) René de Buzelet	6-1, 6-1, 1-6, 6-1
1929	(Denmark) Erik Worm (2)	(United States) George O'Connell	7-5, 6-0, 6-3
1930	(Australia) Jack Crawford	(France) Emmanuel du Plaix	6-4, 3-6, 7-5, 6-3
1931	(Switzerland) Hector Fisher	(Switzerland) Charles Aeschlimann	6-0, 7-5, 6-3
1932	(Switzerland) Hector Fisher (2)	(Denmark) Erik Worm	4-6, 7-5, 6-2, 6-0
1933	(Switzerland) Hector Fisher (3)	(Germany) Werner Menzel	6-3, 6-2, 4-6, 2-6, 6-3
1934	(France) Emmanuel du Plaix	(Austria) Hermann Artens	6-3, 4-6, 6-2, retd.
1935	(Switzerland) Max Ellmer	(France) Jacques Jamain	7-5, 6-3, 6-1

=== Women's Singles ===
Year	Champions	Runners-up	Score
1899	(United Kingdom) Miss White	(United Kingdom) M. Bullock	6-2 8-6
1911	(Germany) Dagmar von Krohn	(France) Marie Danet	6-3 6-1
1912	(Australia) Miss Chenery	(United Kingdom) Mrs Swaine	6-0 6-0
1913	(Switzerland) M. Martin	(France) Claire Bardot	6-2 6-2
1914	(United Kingdom) Margaret Tripp	(Australia) Miss Chenery	6-4 6-2
1917	(Switzerland) Mme Donald	(Switzerland) Mlle Tecklenburg	6-1 6-0
1924	(France) Germaine Golding	(France) Marie Danet	6-0 6-1
1926	(Germany) Ilse Friedleben	(France) Germaine Golding	6-4 6-1
1927	(Germany) Cilly Aussem	(France) Marie Conquet	6-2 6-3
1928	(Germany) Cilly Aussem (2)	(Germany) Ilse Friedleben	?
1929	(Germany) Ilse Friedleben (2)	(Italy) Lucia Valerio	5-7 6-2 12-10
1930	(Germany) Cilly Aussem (3)	(United States) Elizabeth Ryan	default
1931	(Switzerland) Lolette Payot	(Germany) Ilse Friedleben	6-4 4-6 6-4
1932	(Switzerland) Lolette Payot (2)	(France) Doris Metaxa	6-3 6-8 6-3
1933	(Switzerland) Lolette Payot (3)	(France) Hélène Haran	8-6 7-5
1934	(Switzerland) Lolette Payot (4)	(France) Simonne Mathieu	6-3 6-2
1935	(Switzerland) Lolette Payot (5)	(Germany) Ilse Friedleben	6-3 6-2

== Event names ==
- Montreux International Tournament (1894)
- Lac Léman Spring International (1895)
- Montreux Easter Meeting (1897)
- Montreux Open Spring International (1898)
- Lake Geneva Championships (1899-1938)
