= Western Province Championships =

Defunct tennis tournament
- Tour: ILTF Circuit
- Founded: 1892; 133 years ago
- Abolished: 1981; 44 years ago
- Location: Cape Town, Western Cape Province, South Africa
- Venue: Glenhaven Tennis Club
- Surface: Grass/Hard

The Western Province Championships, and officially known as Western Province Tennis Association Championships, was a men's and women's international tennis tournament established in 1892. It was originally played on outdoor grass courts, then switched to hard courts later. It was staged at the Glenhaven Tennis Club, Cape Town, Western Cape Province, South Africa, until 1981.

== History ==
The Western Province Championships were established in 1892 and were orgnaised by the Western Province Tennis Association . The championships formed part of the Sugar Circuit (f. 1962) of tournaments held during the 1960s to 1980s. In 1980, the tournament was discontinued after the withdrawal of sponsorship by the South African Sugar Association.

== Venues ==
The championships were staged at the Glenhaven Tennis Club, Cape Town, Western Cape Province, South Africa.
