= Kent County Championships =

Defunct tennis tournament
- Tour: LTA Circuit (1887-1912); ILTF World Circuit (1913-67)
- Founded: 1887; 138 years ago
- Abolished: 1930; 95 years ago
- Location: Blackheath, Kent, England
- Venue: Blackheath LTC
- Surface: Grass

The Kent County Championships was a combined men's and women's LTA/ILTF affiliated grass court tennis tournament founded in 1887. It was first organised by the Kent Lawn Tennis Club (f.1885), and was played at the Rectory Fields, Blackheath, Kent, England. Kent Lawn Tennis Club later changed its name to the Black Heath Lawn Tennis Club. The tournament ran annually with breaks until 1930 when it was discontinued.
