= Tynedale Open =

Defunct tennis tournament
- Founded: 1881; 144 years ago
- Abolished: 1931; 94 years ago
- Location: Hexham, Northumberland, England
- Venue: Priors Flat Grounds
- Surface: Grass

The Tynedale Open was a grass court tennis tournament founded in 1881 as the Hexham Tournament and first staged at Priors Flat Grounds, Hexham, Northumberland, England.

== History ==
The Hexham Tournament was a late 19th century tennis event first staged around August 1881 at Priors Flat Cricket Grounds, Hexham, Northumberland, England. The first winner of the men's singles was England's Jasper Gibson. The first tournament was staged until 1885. In 1888 the Tynedale Lawn Tennis Club, and Tynedale Cricket Club were founded and staged events on the land leased by the Tyndale Athletic Association. In 1890 a second Hexham tournament was revived as the Tynedale Open Tournament (allowing women's competitions) that was organised by the Tynedale Lawn Tennis Club. This event ran until 1931 before it was discontinued.

== Location and Venue ==
Hexham is a market town and civil parish in Northumberland, England, on the south bank of the River Tyne, formed by the confluence of the North Tyne and the South Tyne at Warden nearby, and close to Hadrian's Wall. Hexham was the administrative centre for the Tynedale district.

Tennis first appeared in Hexham in the early 1880s when a cement court was built in the Hexham Abbey grounds. Tynedale Lawn Tennis Club was founded in 1888 and moved to its present-day location on Priors Flat in 1889, after a leasehold was acquired to lay turf (measuring "an area of 58 yards by 40 yards") for the construction of new tennis courts. In the 1940s, three hard (shale) tennis courts were added; these were replaced by tarmacadam courts in the late 1960s. In 1977 a new Tynedale Sports Club was created, merging the hockey, cricket and tennis sections as one sports club. In 2021 The Tynedale Lawn Tennis Club changed its name to the Hexham Lawn Tennis Club.

== Finals ==
=== Men's Singles ===
(incomplete roll)

Year	Winner	Runner-up	Score
Hexham Tournament
1881	(England) Jasper Gibson	(United Kingdom) M. Liddell	6-0, 6–0, 6–2.
1882	(England) Jasper Gibson	(United Kingdom) John Arthur Jackson	6-0, 6–0, 6–2.
Tyndale Open Tournament
1908	(England) Stanley Gate	(United Kingdom) Frank Widdas	1-6, 6–1, 6–4, 4–6, 6–2.

=== Women's Singles ===
(incomplete roll)

Year	Winner	Runner-up	Score
Tyndale Open Tournament
1890	(England) Jane Corder	(England) Helen Jackson	8-6, 6-0
1893	(England) Charlotte Copper	(Scotland) Lottie Paterson	6-4, 3-6, 6-1
1894	(England) Helen Jackson	(Scotland) Lottie Paterson	6-3, 6-2
1895	(England) Lucy Kendal	(United Kingdom) B. Jackson	w.o.
1896	(United Kingdom) Beatrice Wood Draffen	(England) Lucy Kendal	6-4, 8-6
1897	(England) Lucy Kendal	(United Kingdom) Miss Lister	6-0, 6-3
1898	(United Kingdom) Muriel Robb	(United Kingdom) Mrs Lewis	2-6, 6–4, 6-2
1907	(United Kingdom) Helen Aitchison	(United Kingdom) Mrs J.E. Day	divided title
1908	(United Kingdom) Mrs J.E. Day	(United Kingdom) P. Lee	6-2, 6-1
1909	(United Kingdom) Mabel Hurlbatt Dudgeon	(United Kingdom) Annie Mack	7-5. 6-4
1911	(United Kingdom) Mabel Hurlbatt Dudgeon	(United Kingdom) Mrs Wilkinson	def
1912	(United Kingdom) M. Fergus	(United Kingdom) Miss Walton-Brown	6-0, 6-1
1914	(United Kingdom) M.E. Morton	(United Kingdom) Mrs Neilson	6-4, 6-2
1915/1919	Not held (due to world war one)		
1920	(United Kingdom) Ruth Watson	(United Kingdom) Mrs Spoor	8-6, 6-4
1921	(United Kingdom) M. Hart	(United Kingdom) Mrs Helps	3-6, 6–1, 9-7
1923	(United Kingdom) Lesley Cadle	(United Kingdom) Dorothy Alexander	6-2, 2–6, 6-2
1924	(United Kingdom) Lesley Cadle	(United Kingdom) C.D. Shafto	6-1, 7-5
1925	(United Kingdom) Ruth Watson	(United Kingdom) Kathleen Aitchison	10-8. 8-6
1926	(United Kingdom) Ruth Watson	(United Kingdom) Lesley Cadle	w.o.
1927	(United Kingdom) Ruth Watson	(United Kingdom) Kathleen Aitchison	6-4, 6-3
1928	(United Kingdom) Ruth Watson	(United Kingdom) V. March	7-5, 6-1
1929	(United Kingdom) E. Carrick	(United Kingdom) V. March	6-2, 6-1
1931	(United Kingdom) Ruth Watson	(United Kingdom) Dorothy Alexander	6-4, 3–6, 6-0
