= Jane Corder =

English tennis player

- Full name: Jane Maria Corder
- Country (sports): GBR
- Born: 1874 Newcastle upon Tyne, Northumberland England
- Died: 29 September 1965 (aged 90–91) Edinburgh, Scotland
- Turned pro: 1885 (amateur)
- Retired: 1895

Singles
- Career titles: 11

Grand Slam singles results
- Wimbledon: 1R (1895)

Jane Maria Corder (1874 - 29 September 1965) was an English born British tennis player. In major tournaments of the late 19th century she was a semi finalist in singles at the 1891 Northern Championships, and finalist in the All England Mixed Doubles Championships event at the same meeting. She also competed at the Wimbledon Championships in 1895. She won two of the big home nations titles including the Scottish Championships in 1893, and Welsh Championships in 1895. She was active from 1885 to 1895 and contested 21 singles finals, and won 11 titles.

== Career Finals (21) ==
=== Titles (11) ===
Year	Tournament	Location	Surface	Opponent	Score
1890	Tynedale Open	Hexham	Grass	(United Kingdom) Helen Jackson	8-6, 6-0
1891	South of Scotland Championships	Moffat	Grass	(United Kingdom) Evelyn Blencowe	6-4, 6-1
1891	East of Scotland Championships	St. Andrews	Grass	(Scotland) Miss Moir	6-4, 4-6, 6-4
1892	Northumberland Championships	Newcastle	Grass	(United Kingdom) Helen Jackson	2-6, 9-7, 6-4
1892	East of Scotland Championships (2)	St. Andrews	Grass	(Scotland) Miss Moir	6-1, 3-6, 6-2
1893	Lansdowne Championships	Dublin II	Grass	(Ireland) Miss Scott	6-4, 6-0
1893	Scottish Championships	St. Andrews	Grass	(Scotland) Lilla Moir	6-0, 6-4
1893	Northumberland Championships (2)	Newcastle	Grass	(United Kingdom) Charlotte Cooper	6-2, 7-5
1893	Boulogne International Championship	Boulogne-sur-Mer	Clay	(United Kingdom) Mrs White	6-0, 6-2, 6-2
1894	Sheffield & Hallamshire Tournament	Sheffield	Grass	(United Kingdom) Florence Thompson	6-1, 6-3
1895	Welsh Championships	Penarth	Grass	(United Kingdom) Helen Jackson	4-6, 7-5, 6-4
