= Lottie Paterson =

- Full name: Charlotte H. Paterson
- Country (sports): SCO
- Born: c. 1860 Scotland
- Died: Unknown
- Turned pro: 1883 (amateur tour)
- Retired: 1908

Singles
- Career titles: 15

Grand Slam singles results
- Wimbledon: QF (1895, 1896)

Charlotte 'Lottie' H. Paterson born (1860 – ?) also known as L.H. Paterson was a Scottish tennis player. She was a two time quarter finalist at the 1895 and 1896 Wimbledon Championships. She won the Scottish National Championships three times consecutively (1894–1896), and was a finalist at the Irish Championships in 1895. She was active from 1883 to 1908 and won 15 career singles titles.

== Career ==
Lottie was born circa 1860 in Scotland. She competed mainly in Scotland and played her first tournament in 1883 at the South of Scotland Championships in Moffat which she won against a Miss. A. Forest.

In major tournaments of the late 19th century she played three times at Wimbledon at the 1895 Wimbledon Championships where she reached the quarter finals stage, but was beaten by England's Charlotte Cooper, at the 1896 championships she reached the quarter finals again, but was beaten by Edith Austin. In addition she was a finalist at the Irish Championships in 1895 losing to Cooper again.

Her main national title successes came at winning the Scottish National Championships three times consecutively (1894–1896). Her other career singles highlights include winning the Whitehouse Open in Edinburgh three times consecutively (1889–1891), the South of Scotland Championships at Moffat three times consecutively (1892–1894), the Boulogne International Championship played on clay at Boulogne-sur-Mer three times consecutively (1894–1896) and the West of Scotland Championships at Castle Wemyss three times consecutively (1894–1896),

In addition she was also a finalist at the South of Scotland Championships (1884, 1887–88), the North of Scotland Championships (1892), the Tynedale Open Tournament (1894), the Worthing Open (1906) in Worthing where she divided the title with Gertrude Provis Houselander. She played her final singles tournament in 1908 at the South of England Championships where she reached the quarter finals before losing to Alice Greene.

== Career Singles (23) ==
=== Titles (15) ===
- 1884 - Bridge of Allan Open
- 1885 - Rothesay Hard Court Open
- 1889 - Whitehouse Open
- 1890 - Whitehouse Open
- 1891 - Whitehouse Open
- 1894 - Scottish Championships
- 1894 - Boulogne International Championship
- 1894 - West of Scotland Championships
- 1894 - South of Scotland Championships
- 1895 - Scottish Championships
- 1895 - Boulogne International Championship
- 1895 - West of Scotland Championships
- 1896 - Scottish Championships
- 1896 - Boulogne International Championship
- 1896 - West of Scotland Championships

=== Runner-Up (8) ===
- 1884 - South of Scotland Championships
- 1888 - South of Scotland Championships
- 1890 - Scottish Championships
- 1892 - North of Scotland Championships
- 1892 - Scottish Championships
- 1893 - Tynedale Open
- 1894 - Tynedale Open
- 1895 - Irish Championships
