= Pacific Northwest Open Championships =

Tournament information
- Tour: USTA Circuit
- Founded: 1891; 134 years ago
- Editions: 131
- Location: Tacoma, Washington, United States
- Venue: Tacoma LTC
- Surface: Hard
- Prize money: $40,000 (combined)

The Pacific Northwest Open Championships is a USTA affiliated hard court tennis tournament founded in 1891 as the Pacific Northwest Championships a clay court event. Also simply known as the Pacific Northwest Open, it has been continually played at the Tacoma Lawn Tennis Club, Tacoma, Washington in the United States.
