= Hudson River Championships =

Defunct tennis tournament
- Tour: ILTF Circuit (1913–1968)
- Founded: 1887; 138 years ago
- Abolished: 1910; 115 years ago
- Location: Englewood; Hastings-on-Hudson; Newburg; Poughkeepsie; Yonkers
- Venue: Various

The Hudson River Championships also known as the Hudson River Association Championships was a combined men's and women's tennis tournament founded in 1888 by the Hudson River Lawn Tennis Association. It was first played at the Far and Near Lawn Tennis Club, Hastings-on-Hudson, New York, United States. It was then played various venues of the association members through till 1910 when it was discontinued.

== History ==
The championships were organised by the Hudson River Lawn Tennis Association that was founded in 1887. that was composed of the Amakassin, Englewood, Park Hill, Poughkeepsie, Powelton, Sleepy Hollow, and West Point, Country Clubs. The association and the clubs it represented were members of the United States National Lawn Tennis Association.

Previous winners of the men's and women's singles titles included; Carman Randolph Runyon, Charles Sands, Valentine Gill Hall and Ellen Roosevelt. The tournament was played at various locations including; Englewood, New Jersey, Hastings-on-Hudson, New York, Newburgh, New York, Poughkeepsie, New York, and Yonkers, New York, United States.
