= Singapore LLTC Spring Open =

The Singapore LLTC Spring Open was a clay court tennis tournament founded in 1886. It was organised by and played at the Ladies' Lawn Tennis Club, Dhoby Green, Singapore until at least 1928. The club closed in 1932.

The Ladies Lawn Tennis Club was founded in July 1884. It held its first championship tournament in December 1884, that event became known as the Singapore LLTC Winter Tournament.The club closed in the early 1930s due to financial debts.
