= North of Scotland Championships =

Defunct tennis tournament
- Founded: 1889; 137 years ago
- Abolished: 1989; 37 years ago
- Location: Broughty Ferry, Elgin, Moray, Scotland
- Venue: Broughty Ferry Lawn Tennis Club; Elgin Lawn Tennis Club; Kirkcaldy Tennis Club; Magdalen Yard Lawn Tennis Club
- Surface: Clay

The North of Scotland Championships, later known as the Gleaner Oils North of Scotland Championships for sponsorship reasons, was a combined men's and women's clay court tennis tournament first established by the Broughty Ferry Lawn Tennis Club, Broughty Ferry, Dundee in 1889 as Championship of the North Scotland. From 1905 it was then held at Elgin Lawn Tennis Club, Elgin, Moray, Scotland until 1989.

== History ==
The Championship of the North Scotland were established in 1889 at the Broughty Ferry Lawn Tennis Club (f.1885), Broughty Ferry, Dundee Scotland. The tournament ran under that name until 1891. In 1892 it was branded as the North of Scotland Championships and was at this time staged at the Magdalen Yard Lawn Tennis Club.

The Championships were not held during World War I. In 1919 the tournament was abandoned again, then reinstated at Elgin in 1920 as the North of Scotland Championships until 1969 .

In 1970 the tournament was renamed as the North of Scotland Open Championships. In 1973 the oil company Esso took over sponsorship of the event and was called the Esso North of Scotland Championships until 1979. The event returned to its original name as no sponsors were found until 1988, when the company Gleaner Oils took over sponsorship until 1989.

== Event name ==
- Championship of the North Scotland (1889–1891)
- North of Scotland Championships (1892–1969)
- North of Scotland Open Championships (1970–1972)
- Esso North of Scotland Championships (1973–1979)
- North of Scotland Championships (1980–1987)
- Gleaner Oils North of Scotland Championships (1988–1989)
