= Kathleen Nunneley =

New Zealand tennis player and librarian

Kate Nunneley
- Full name: Kathleen Mary Nunneley
- Country (sports): New Zealand
- Born: 16 September 1872 Little Bowden, Leicestershire, England
- Died: 28 September 1956 (aged 84) Wellington, New Zealand

Kathleen Mary 'Kate' Nunneley (16 September 1872 – 28 September 1956) was a New Zealand tennis player and librarian. She was the best woman tennis player in New Zealand in the late 1800s and early 1900s, and possibly still the best New Zealand woman player ever.

== Early life and career ==
Kathleen Nunneley was born in Little Bowden, Leicestershire, England on 16 September 1872, the daughter of John Nunneley, a wholesale grocer, and Kate Young. After her father committed suicide in 1893, she emigrated to New Zealand with her mother and siblings on 7 December 1894 and settled in central Wellington. Shortly after, she joined the Thorndon Lawn Tennis Club

She won the national singles title 13 times in a row from 1895 to 1907, winning in total 32 national titles. She defeated Blanche Hillyard the Wimbledon champion, and won two mixed doubles titles with Anthony Wilding; unfortunately there were fewer opportunities at Wimbledon for women players.

In May 1896 Nunneley won the singles title at the New South Wales Championships in Sydney, defeating Mabel Shaw in the final. The following year she lost her title in the challenge round to Phoebe Howlitt.

Nunneley worked as a librarian for 30 years, retiring from her position as assistant in charge of the reference department at the Wellington Public Library in 1935.

She had her tennis gold medals made into a trophy for interprovincial women's tennis, the Nunneley Casket. She was inducted into the New Zealand Sports Hall of Fame in 1995.

== Sources ==
- Profiles of Fame: The stories of New Zealand's Greatest Sporting Achievers by Ron Palenski (2002, New Zealand Sports Hall of Fame, Dunedin) ISBN 0-473-08536-4
