= Boulogne International Championship =

Boulogne International Championnat international de Boulogne

Defunct tennis tournament
- Tour: ILTF Circuit (1913-69)
- Founded: 1887; 138 years ago
- Abolished: 1938; 87 years ago
- Location: Boulogne-sur-Mer; France
- Venue: Tennis Club Boulogne-sur-Mer

The Boulogne International Championship or Championnat international de Boulogne or simply called the Boulogne International was a combined men's and women's open clay court tennis tournament established in 1887 and was first played at the Tennis Club Boulogne-sur-Mer, Boulogne-sur-Mer, France. The tournament became part of ILTC Circuit and was staged until 1938.

== History ==
In 1885 the Tennis Club Boulogne-sur-Mer was founded by Lady Kate Wood, wife of General Sir Henry Hastings Affleck Wood. In 1887, the lawn tennis club inaugurated a major international tournament. Winners of the tournament was at first dominated by players from the British Isles with the most successful men's players being Wilberforce Vaughan Eaves, Roy Allen and Francis Gordon Lowe. The first non British men's player to win was the German player Robert Kleinschroth in 1908. He was the brother of Heinrich Kleinschroth who also played tennis.

The first French men's player to win the Boulogne International Championship was Georges Octave Manset in 1913.

The ladies tournament was similarly dominated by British players in its early years by Aurea Farrington Edgington, Lottie Paterson, Henrietta Govey and Jane Corder. Following World War I the first French woman to win the title was Suzanne Lenglen in 1920. From the beginning of the 1920s until the tournament was discontinued due to World War II it was monopolized by winning players from France. Following the second world war the tournament was resumed but never regained its initial prestige in attracting notable international players. The tournament, however, is still being held today.
