= Otago Championships =

Defunct tennis tournament
- Tour: ILTF World Circuit (1913–52)
- Founded: 1886; 139 years ago
- Abolished: 1952; 73 years ago
- Location: Dunedin, Otago, New Zealand
- Venue: Carisbrook Club Ground
- Surface: Grass / outdoor

The Otago Championships was a men's and women's grass court tennis tournament was founded in 1886 as the Otago Lawn Tennis Association Tournament. The tournament was first played in Carisbrook Club Ground, Dunedin, Otago, New Zealand. It was played annually till 1952 when it was downgraded from the main ILTF World Circuit.

== History ==
This tournament organised by the Otago LTA was first held in December 1886, but in subsequent years it was moved up the calendar to its fixed position of late March or April, depending on when Easter occurred. In later years it was also often referred to as the Otago Lawn Tennis Association Easter Tournament. Former winners of men's singles included; Minden Fenwick, Anthony Wilding and Alan Stedman. Previous winners of women's singles included Ruth Orbell, Flora Campbell, Muriel Pattison, and Sonia Cox
