= Maude Delano-Osborne =

Canadian tennis player

Maude Delano Osborne
- Country (sports): Canada
- Born: 23 June 1872 Durban, Natal, South Africa
- Died: 18 April 1948 (aged 75) Sutton, Ontario, Canada
- Turned pro: 1890 (amateur)
- Retired: 1898

Singles
- Career record: 0–0
- Career titles: 9

Maude Delano Osborne (23 June 1872 - 18 April 1948) (also known as Maude Osborne Smith) was a Canadian tennis player active in the latter half of the 19th century. She won the first ever Canadian Championships in 1892, and would win it a further two times in 1893 and 1894.

Maude was born in Natal, South Africa, before her family emigrated to Canada.

Her career singles highlights included winning the Niagara International Championship three times between 1893 and 1895.

She won the Ontario Championships two times in 1892 and 1895. In addition she won the City of Toronto Championships in 1895.

== Family ==
Her daughter's were the notable figure skaters Cecil Smith and Maude Smith.

== Sources ==
- Hall, M. Ann (2016). The Girl and the Game A History of Women's Sport in Canada (2nd ed.). Toronto: University of Toronto Press. ISBN 9781442634145.
- Wright & Ditson's Lawn Tennis Guide 1895.
