= Ruth Durlacher =

Irish tennis player

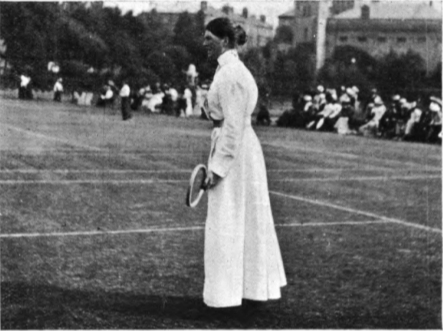
- Ruth Durlacher (before 1903)
- Country (sports): United Kingdom
- Born: 22 July 1876 Malahide, Dublin
- Died: 21 September 1946 (aged 70) Buckingham, Buckinghamshire

Singles

Grand Slam singles results
- Wimbledon: DF (1899)

Ruth Durlacher (née Dyas; 22 July 1876 – 21 September 1946) was an Irish tennis player. She played in the Wimbledon Championships between 1897 and 1907.

== Early life ==
Durlacher was born Ruth Dyas in Malahide on 22 July 1876. Durlacher was daughter to Jacob Dyas and Sophia Dyas. Durlacher was baptised Protestant (Church of Ireland) on the 16 November 1900 in St. James Paddington. Durlacher had one brother and one older sister. The Durlachers were a wealthy family. Their original family home was Heathstown House. Durlacher grew up in England. She entered her first competition at 18. She married fellow tennis player Neville John Durlacher in Rathdown on 17 December 1898 at the age of 23. They had two children: Patrick Durlacher who was a successful cricket player and Nora Durlacher who was a successful tennis player.

== Tennis career ==
The Irish Championships were first established in 1879 and took place in Pembroke Place, and it moved on to Wilton Place from 1880 till 1902. Following Wilton Place, the tournament took place in Fitzwilliam Square, where it remained until its final location in 1972 at the Fitzwilliam Lawn Tennis Club in Appian Way, Dublin. It was in this year that the tournament changed its name to the Irish Open due to sponsorship reasons. Durlacher played in the Irish Championships in 1895 for the first time when she was 18 years old and thereafter, continued playing in major tournaments for at least a decade.

Durlacher was in a mixed team of some of the finest players from England went to play at the Sporting Club of Cascais, Lisbon with Carlos I of Portugal . The team included the likes of Miss Robb; Mr & Mrs Hillyard and Mr H.S. Mahoney.

=== Singles ===
As her success grew, she further took part at the Wimbledon Championships between 1897 and 1919. Come 1899, Durlacher triumphantly reached the ‘all-comers’ final’ but lost to her opponent Blanche Bingley, who had managed to beat her two years prior in the Irish Championships and who later won six Wimbledon championships.

Durlacher was a finalist four times in the women singles in the Irish Championships , taking place is Fitzwilliam Lawn Tennis Club. In 1897, Blanche Bingley successfully beat Durlacher, 7–5, 2–6, 6–3. Following years, Louisa Martin won the singles tournament, 6-1, 6-2, against her opponent Durlacher. In 1899, Muriel Robb beat Durlacher in the final, 9-7, 6-1. Louisa Martin beat Ruth Durlacher in the final in 1902, 6-8, 6-4, 7-5.

She had success in major English tournaments where she beat many of the best players of the period, such as the following: Buxton Open Champion in 1898, beating Miss Hillyard in the final, 6-2. 6-4; Warwickshire Champion at Leamington in 1898; Hallamshire Champion, Sheffield in 1899 Edgbaston Champion in 1898, beating Miss Pickering, 6-4, 2-6, 6-1; the Northern Champion at Old Trafford, Manchester in 1899, beating Miss C. Cooper, 6-3. 5-7, 6-3.;Trefriw, Conwy Valley, North Wales, Challenge Cup Champion in 1899, beating Miss Makinson and the Midland Counties Challenge Cup Champion at Edgbaston in 1901, beating Miss Garfitt, 6-4, 6-4

1905 was Durlacher's last major win which was at the inaugural Frinton Championships, Frinton-on-Sea, Essex. In the final she defeated Evelyn Blencowe Driver, 7-5, 6-2.

=== Ladies Doubles ===
Durlacher played in the ladies' doubles category of the Irish Championships, and was the winner with her partners of Alice Pickering in 1896; Louisa Martin in 1898, 1899 and 1901; and Ms. Hazlett in 1902.

Durlacher played at the Wimbledon Championships from 1897 to 1907. In 1898 and 1899, she won the doubles tournament, partnering Bertha Steedman.

She also competed in a variety of tournaments in English counties which included reaching the finals at the Northern Championships at Old Trafford, Manchester and at the Buxton Open. In 1901 she partnered Miss Tolloch to win the Suffolk Championship at Saxmundham, beating Miss C.M. Wilson & Miss H.Lane, 6-2, 6-3 in the final.

=== Mixed Doubles ===
Durlacher took part in the mixed doubles under the Irish Open. In 1898, Durlacher won the mixed doubles with partner Harold A. Nisbet. In 1901 and 1902, she won the same title with partner Laurence Doherty. The 1901 final they beat Neville Durlacher (her husband) and S. Pollen, 6-3 10-8. In 1902 they won 2 sets to 1 against Mr Carey and Miss Garfitt.

She was known to partner her husband at major tournaments. In 1901 they played at the Buxton Open, where they lost in the final against Laurence Doherty and Miss Robb, 6-0. 6-2.

== Golf career ==
Durlacher became one of the best golfers of her time in Europe, once she had finished competing at the highest level in tennis. She particularly had a good record when playing matchplay format.

=== Team performance ===
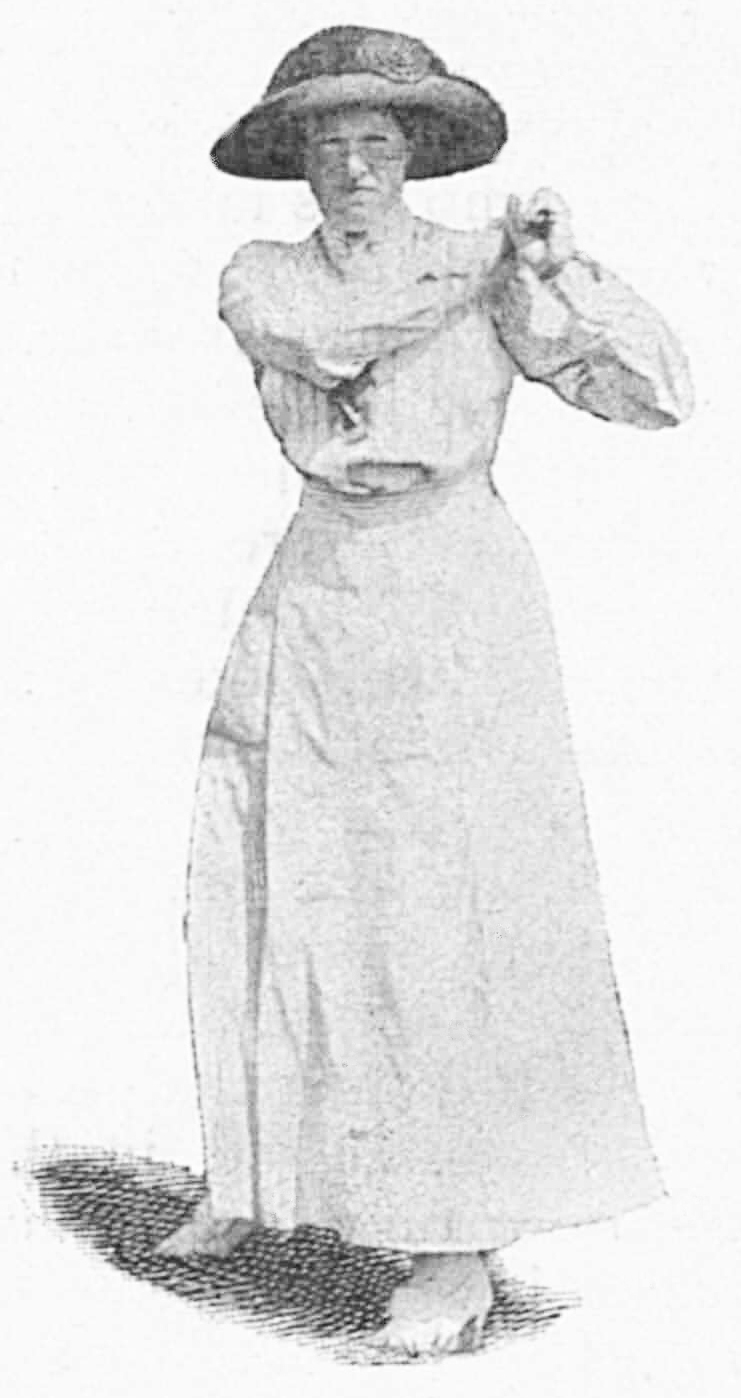
Ruth Durlacher - Lady Golf Champion of France in 1911

1905 through to 1910, she represented Ireland in the Women's Home Internationals matches. The Miller International Shield became the prize for the winning team in 1905 onwards, which Ireland won in 1907, becoming the ‘Triple Crown’ winners. A feat not achieved again by the Ireland team until 1980. She also competed in the 1910s and 1920s for Middlesex. Durlacher was the Captain of the South East of England team that won the Ladies Terratorial Tournament, hosted at Walton Heath in 1911, she beat Miss L. Moore (Midlands) by 1 up. Also that same year, another team match which attracted much publicity was the “Battle of the Sexes” challenge match of the Gentlemen v. Ladies, hosted at Stoke Poges Golf Club. Durlacher lost her morning match against Angus Hambro M.P. The Gentlemen won 16 to 7. After World War I, in 1919 she was still formidable in matches, playing foursomes partnering Mrs White, beating Miss Benton and Mrs Bolton in the Ladies' Field Victory Foursomes at the Ranelagh Club at Barn Elms, London.

=== Individual (non-team) performance ===
The peak of Durlacher’s individual golf achievements came in 1911:

- Won the Stroke Scratch competition with a score of 85 at the Irish Championships.
- Won the Ladies Championship of France at Le Touquet Links. The 1^{st} round she beat Mrs Walker; the Semi-final she beat Mdlle. de Bellet and in the final she beat Mrs Compton by 4 up with 3 to play.
- Semi-finalist in the Scratch section of the Lady’s Pictorial Coronation Cup. One of the largest individual player tournaments across England with Regional qualifying events. Durlacher qualified for the finals as a South of England player. She lost to Miss Elizabeth Moore on the 19^{th} hole at Stoke Poges Golf Club.

Durlacher was a member of several golf clubs, yet in match results she was often shown from Prince’s Ladies Golf Club (LGC), Mitcham, Surrey. In 1907 she was a member of the following clubs: Aberdovey LGC., Wales; Ashford Manor, Middlesex; Frinton, Essex; Lahinch, Co.Clare, Ireland; Prince's LGC, Mitcham, Surrey; Romford, Essex. Though, her favourite course was Formby Championship Course in Merseyside.

== Later life and legacy ==
Durlacher presented a Perpetual Cup to the Carrickmines Croquet & Lawn Tennis Club, Dublin, Ireland, in 1908, which is still competed for in the 21st century.

During much of her adult life, she lived in Stoke Poges, first at Larchmoor, then the White House and finally a mile along at Pinegrove, overlooking the Stoke Poges Golf Course.

Nick "Pa" Lane Jackson, the founder of Stoke Poges Golf Course and co-founder of golf at Le Touquet, wrote about Durlacher in his book of reminiscences, (in 1891) I met Miss Dyer, afterwards Mrs Durlacher in Dublin, and thought her, one of the finest specimens of a handsome Irish girl...after marriage became a friend and speedily discovered that her kindly thoughtful qualities equalled her physical gift.”

She died in Stoke Poges, Buckinghamshire in 1946.
