= Alice Pickering =

English tennis player

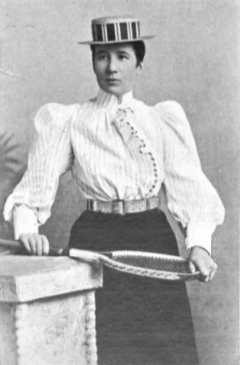
- Country (sports): United Kingdom
- Born: 1860
- Died: 18 February 1939 (aged 78–79)

Singles
- Career titles: 19

Grand Slam singles results
- Wimbledon: F (1896, 1897)

Alice Mabel Pickering (1860–1939), née Simpson, was an English tennis player who twice reached the final of the Wimbledon Championship.

Pickering played at the Wimbledon Championships from 1895 to 1901. In 1896, she won the all-comers-competition at Wimbledon 1896, but lost the challenge round against Charlotte Cooper 2–6, 3–6. She again reached the all-comers final in the following year, but this time lost to Blanche Bingley.

In 1896, she won the doubles competition at the Irish Championships with Ruth Durlacher.

== Grand Slam finals ==
=== Single (1 runner-up) ===
Result	Year	Championship	Surface	Opponent	Score
Loss	1896	Wimbledon	Grass	(United Kingdom) Charlotte Cooper	2–6, 3–6

== Personal life ==
Pickering was born in 1860 in the village of Ledsham, West Yorkshire. Her parents were the Reverend Michael Henry Simpson (1816–1888), Vicar of the Church of St Philip and St James, Tow Law, County Durham, between 1862 and 1888, and his wife Elizabeth, née Hendrick (1806–1905). On her mother's side, Pickering was part of an old north country family, being a great-great-granddaughter of Lord Lever of Alkrington Hall.

Pickering was one of 14 children who grew up in Tow Law. Her siblings included Florence Eva Simpson (1865–1923), known as Elva Lorence, a published writer and composer, as well as a painter. Another sister was Katherine Ashton Simpson (1858–1951), known as Kate A. Pearce Simpson, the writer of books and musicals and poetry. She was also an artist, whose work was hung in the Royal Scottish Academy, at the Berwick Exhibition in Newcastle-on-Tyne.

She married William Pickering on 28 July 1885 in Tow Law, County Durham. They had one son, Basil Henry, and the family lived on Lawn Road in Doncaster. William Pickering became Chief Government Inspector of Mines for Yorkshire and the North Midlands. He was killed on 12 July 1912 in the Cadeby Main Pit Disaster.

After William's death, Alice became involved in numerous charitable endeavours during the First World War running the Arnold Auxiliary Hospital in Doncaster. She was awarded an MBE in the March 1918 New Year Honours (MBE) for her wartime contributions and was decorated by the King at Buckingham Palace. She died in 1939 in Doncaster.
