= 1889 women's tennis season =

1889 Women's Tennis Season
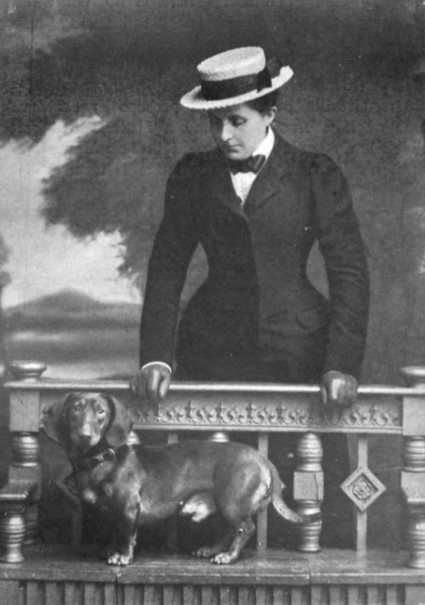
- Louisa Martin wins the Irish Championships and is joint title leader this year

Details
- Duration: 8 January – 30 December
- Edition: 14th
- Tournaments: 63
- Categories: Important (4); National (5); Provincial/Regional/State (14); County (10); Regular (30)

Achievements (singles)
- Most titles: (Ireland) Louisa Martin (3) (Ireland) May Langrishe (3)
- Most finals: (Ireland) Louisa Martin (4)

The 1889 Women's Tennis Season was a tennis tournament circuit composed of 63 major, national, regional, county, and regular tournaments. The season began in January in Madras, India, and ended in December in Dunedin, New Zealand.

== Summary of season ==
From 1888 until 1912 Britain's Lawn Tennis Association (LTA), grew in status and influence to become the de facto international tennis governing body before the proper International Lawn Tennis Federation commenced operations. Despite the United States National Lawn Tennis Association (USNLTA) forming in 1881 a good seven years before the LTA, it was the British body that set laws, settled disputes and organized the increasingly complicated tournament calendar before the International Lawn Tennis Federation (ILTF) formed in March, 1913.

After the formation of the ILTF the world tennis circuit going forward was a highly organised and structured network of national and international tournaments. Most tennis tournaments were usually mixed events for men and women, and the women's international tennis circuit certainly up to 1923 was composed mainly of tournaments on the British and European Circuits. After the USNLTA joined the ILTF this would later change with more and more tournaments being staged globally. Women tennis players on the world circuit up to the open era were funded by their national associations enabling them to travel and take part in international tournaments.

1889 sees a slight decrease in the number women's singles events being held as the tennis circuit continues to form. The 1889 women's tennis season began on 8 January with the first Southern India Championships staged at Madras, India. In May 1889 at the first major event of the year the Irish Championships played at the Fitzwilliam Lawn Tennis Club in Dublin, Ireland. Ireland's Louisa Martin wins the singles title beating defending champion Blanche Hillyard, she also picks up the ladies doubles event is won partnered with Florence Stanuell. In the mixed doubles Lena Rice and Willoughby Hamilton defeat Blanche Hillyard and Harold Stone. In terms of draw size the South of England Championships was the largest tournament of the year with a draw of 30 across two events.

In mid June 1889 the change in scheduling is continued when the U.S. National Championships are held at the Philadelphia Cricket Club, PA, Bertha Townsend successfully defends her title in the challenge round by defeating Lida Voorhees in straight sets.

Later the same month at the third major tournament of the year the Northern Championships played at the Northern Lawn Tennis Club in Manchester, England Lottie Dod successfully defends her title beating Blanche Hillyard in three sets, in the women's doubles final sisters Bertha Steedman and Mary Steedman defeat another sister pairing Ann and Lottie Dod in straight sets, and the All England Mixed Doubles Championship event, is won by Lottie Dod and John Charles Kay who defeat Blanche Hillyard and Ernest Renshaw in the final.

In July at the fourth and final major event of the season the 1889 Wimbledon Championships the world's first major tennis tournament, Blanche Bingley takes the title, when she defeats upcoming Irish player Lena Rice in three very close sets to win her third major title. The season ended on 30 December 1889 at the New Zealand Championships, held in Dunedin, New Zealand that was played on grass.

== Season results ==
Prior to the creation of the International Lawn Tennis Federation and the establishment of its world championship events in 1913 the Wimbledon Championships, the U.S. National Championships, the Irish Lawn Tennis Championships and the Northern Championships were considered by players and historians as the four most important tennis tournaments to win, and together effectively making an early incarnation of the Grand Slam events we know today.

Key

Important.
National
Provincial/State/Regional
County
Regular

=== January ===
Ended	Tournament	Winner	Finalist	Semifinalist	Quarterfinalist
12 Jan	Southern India Championships; Madras Gymkhana Club; Madras, India; Clay; Singles - Doubles	(India) Miss Nicholas; 6–4, 3–6, 6–3	(India) Edith Morgan		
12 Jan	Southern India Championships; Madras Gymkhana Club; Madras, India; Clay; Singles - Doubles	(India) Miss Clarke (India) Miss Nicholas; 6–5, 6–3	(India) Mrs Smart (India) Mrs Swinton		

=== February ===
Ended	Tournament	Winner	Finalist	Semi finalist	Quarter finalist
9 Feb.	Cannes Beau Site Hotel Tournament; Beau Site Hotel; Cannes, France; Clay; Singles - Doubles	(England) Constance Bryan def.	(England) Elsie Lane	(Ireland) Miss Maguire	
9 Feb.	Cannes Beau Site Hotel Tournament; Beau Site Hotel; Cannes, France; Clay; Singles - Doubles	(England) Elsie Lane (Ireland) Miss Maguire won	?	(Ireland) Miss Maguire	
12 Feb.	Otago LTA Tournament; Carisbrook Club Ground; Dunedin, New Zealand; Grass; Singles - Doubles	(New Zealand) Ruth Orbell; 8–3	(New Zealand) L. Mackerras		
20 Feb.	Pau International Tournament (later Pau Championships); Pau France; Clay; Singles - Doubles	(England) Mrs Bruce-Johnston def.	(Scotland) Miss MacFarlane		

=== March ===
Ended	Tournament	Winner	Finalist	Semifinalist	Quarterfinalist
17 Mar	Championships of Bermuda; Hamilton, Bermuda; Grass; Singles - Doubles	(Colony of Natal) Mabel Grant; 4–6, 6–3, 6–3	(United States) Grace Roosevelt		
17 Mar	Championships of Bermuda; Hamilton, Bermuda; Grass; Singles - Doubles	(United States) Ellen Roosevelt (United States) Grace Roosevelt; 2–1 sets	(Bermuda) Mrs Erkine (Bermuda) Mary G. Gray		

=== April ===
Ended	Tournament	Winner	Finalist	Semifinalist	Quarterfinalist
8 Apr.	Singapore LLTC Spring Open; Singapore, Straits Settlement; Grass; Singles - Doubles	(Straits Settlements) Mrs. Rowell; 6–2, 6–2	(Straits Settlements) Mrs. Dare		
24 Apr	Geelong Easter Tournament; Geelong LTC; Geelong, Australia; Asphalt; Singles - Doubles	(Australia) Ellen M Mayne; 3–6, 6–5, 6–3	(Australia) A. Chenery	(Australia) Miss McKenzie	

=== May ===
Ended	Tournament	Winner	Finalist	Semifinalist	Quarterfinalist
5 May	Fitzwilliam Club Championships; Fitzwilliam LTC; Dublin, Ireland; Grass; Singles - Doubles	(Ireland) Florence Stanuell; 6–3, 6–1	(Ireland) Connie Butler	(Ireland) G. Crofton (Ireland) Miss Story	(Ireland) Louisa Martin
5 May	Fitzwilliam Club Championships; Fitzwilliam LTC; Dublin, Ireland; Grass; Singles - Doubles	(Ireland) Florence Stanuell (Ireland) Hume R. Jones; 6–3, 6–2	(Ireland) Miss Wilson (Ireland) Charles James	(Ireland) G. Crofton (Ireland) Miss Story	(Ireland) Louisa Martin
10 May.	Ceylon Championships; The Hill Club; Nuwara Eliya, Ceylon; Clay; Singles - Doubles	(Dominion of Ceylon) Mrs Norman; 5–7, 6–2, 6–3	(Dominion of Ceylon) Miss I. J. Watson		
11 May.	New South Wales Championships; Moore Park; Sydney, Australia; Grass; Singles - Doubles	(Australia) Ellen Mayne; 6–3, 5–7, 6–4	(Australia) Ellen Blaxland	(Australia) Edith Raleigh (Australia) Mabel Shaw	(Australia) Florence Batt (Australia) Miss Dransfield (Australia) Eliza Fitzgerald (Australia) Isabel Mansfield
11 May.	New South Wales Championships; Moore Park; Sydney, Australia; Grass; Singles - Doubles	(Australia) Ellen Mayne (Australia) Mabel Shaw; 6–3, 6–0	(Australia) Miss Keating (Australia) Miss Raleigh	(Australia) Edith Raleigh (Australia) Mabel Shaw	(Australia) Florence Batt (Australia) Miss Dransfield (Australia) Eliza Fitzgerald (Australia) Isabel Mansfield
11 May.	New South Wales Championships; Moore Park; Sydney, Australia; Grass; Singles - Doubles	(Australia) Eliza Fitzgerald (Australia) Robert Fitzgerald; 2–6, 6–2, 9–7	(Australia) E.M. Mayne (Australia) Dudley Webb	(Australia) Edith Raleigh (Australia) Mabel Shaw	(Australia) Florence Batt (Australia) Miss Dransfield (Australia) Eliza Fitzgerald (Australia) Isabel Mansfield
25 May.	Irish Championships; Fitzwilliam LTC; Dublin, Ireland; Grass; Singles - Doubles	(Ireland) Louisa Martin; 7–5, 6–0	(England) Blanche Hillyard	(Ireland) Lena Rice (United Kingdom) Bertha Steedman	(Ireland) Connie Butler (Ireland) Florence Stanuell (United Kingdom) Mary Steedman (England) Lilian Watson
25 May.	Irish Championships; Fitzwilliam LTC; Dublin, Ireland; Grass; Singles - Doubles	(Ireland) Louisa Martin (Ireland) Florence Stanuell; 6–4, 6–2	(England) Blanche Hillyard (Ireland) Lena Rice	(Ireland) Lena Rice (United Kingdom) Bertha Steedman	(Ireland) Connie Butler (Ireland) Florence Stanuell (United Kingdom) Mary Steedman (England) Lilian Watson
25 May.	Irish Championships; Fitzwilliam LTC; Dublin, Ireland; Grass; Singles - Doubles	(Ireland) Lena Rice (Ireland) Willoughby Hamilton; 6–4, 5–7, 6–4, 6–4	(England) Blanche Hillyard (Ireland) Harold Stone	(Ireland) Lena Rice (United Kingdom) Bertha Steedman	(Ireland) Connie Butler (Ireland) Florence Stanuell (United Kingdom) Mary Steedman (England) Lilian Watson

=== June ===
Ended	Tournament	Winner	Finalist	Semifinalist	Quarterfinalist
1 Jun.	Championship of the West of England; Bath, England; Grass; Singles - Doubles	(Ireland) Louisa Martin; 4–6, 6–1, 6–2	(Ireland) Florence Stanuell	(United Kingdom) Mary Agg (United Kingdom) N. Pope	(England) N. Everett (Ireland) Beatrice Langrishe (England) Florence Mardall (Scotland) Lottie Paterson
1 Jun.	Championship of the West of England; Bath, England; Grass; Singles - Doubles	(Ireland) Louisa Martin (Ireland) Florence Stanuell; 6–0, 6–3	(United Kingdom) Miss Everett (United Kingdom) Miss Pope	(United Kingdom) Mary Agg (United Kingdom) N. Pope	(England) N. Everett (Ireland) Beatrice Langrishe (England) Florence Mardall (Scotland) Lottie Paterson
1 Jun.	Championship of the West of England; Bath, England; Grass; Singles - Doubles	(Ireland) Louisa Martin (United Kingdom) James Baldwin; 6–2, 6–3	(United Kingdom) Miss Pope (England) Harry Grove	(United Kingdom) Mary Agg (United Kingdom) N. Pope	(England) N. Everett (Ireland) Beatrice Langrishe (England) Florence Mardall (Scotland) Lottie Paterson
8 Jun.	Cheltenham Championships; Cheltenham, England; Grass; Singles - Doubles	(Ireland) Louisa Martin; 6-1, 4–6, 6-2	(Ireland) Florence Stanuell	(England) Florence Mardall (England) Blanche Hillyard	(United Kingdom) Mary Agg (England) Miss Crossley (Ireland) Beatrice Langrishe (United Kingdom) N. Pope
8 Jun.	Cheltenham Championships; Cheltenham, England; Grass; Singles - Doubles	(Ireland) Florence Stanuell (United Kingdom) James Baldwin; 7-5, 5–7, 6-2	(Ireland) Louisa Martin (England) Wilfred Milne	(England) Florence Mardall (England) Blanche Hillyard	(United Kingdom) Mary Agg (England) Miss Crossley (Ireland) Beatrice Langrishe (United Kingdom) N. Pope
10 Jun.	Whitehouse Open; Edinburgh, Scotland; Clay; Singles - Doubles	(Scotland) Lottie Paterson; 6–0, 6–1	(England) Ann Dod		
10 Jun.	Whitehouse Open; Edinburgh, Scotland; Clay; Singles - Doubles	(United Kingdom) Ann Dodd (Scotland) Richard Millar Watson; 6–4, 10–8	(England) Lottie Dod (Cape Colony) Edward Barnard Fuller		
11 June	Wissahickon Open; Philadelphia Cricket Club; Wissahickon, United States; Grass; Singles - Doubles	(United States) Lida Voorhees def	(United States) Mrs. Harris	(United States) Miss D.F. Butterfield (United States) Grace Roosevelt	(United States) Rebecca H. Lycett (United States) Laura Knight (United States) Marian Wright
11 June	Wissahickon Open; Philadelphia Cricket Club; Wissahickon, United States; Grass; Singles - Doubles	(United States) Lida Voorhees (United States) Mrs. Harris def	(United States) Ellen Roosevelt (United States) Grace Roosevelt	(United States) Miss D.F. Butterfield (United States) Grace Roosevelt	(United States) Rebecca H. Lycett (United States) Laura Knight (United States) Marian Wright
11 June	Wissahickon Open; Philadelphia Cricket Club; Wissahickon, United States; Grass; Singles - Doubles	(United States) Ellen Roosevelt (United States) Albert Empie Wright def	(United States) Lida Voorhees (United States) Clarence Hobart	(United States) Miss D.F. Butterfield (United States) Grace Roosevelt	(United States) Rebecca H. Lycett (United States) Laura Knight (United States) Marian Wright
14 Jun	London Championships; London Athletic Club; London, England; Grass; Singles - Doubles	(England) May Jacks; 6–2, 6–2	(United Kingdom) Maud Shackle	(England) Miss Canning (England) Olive Tullock	
15 June	Waterloo Open; Waterloo, England; Grass; Singles - Doubles	(United Kingdom) Mary Pick; 6–1, 6–3	(United Kingdom) Miss Pickthall		
15 June	Waterloo Open; Waterloo, England; Grass; Singles - Doubles	(United Kingdom) K. Ack (United Kingdom) Mary Pick; 3–6, 6–3, 6–3	(United Kingdom) Miss Gordon (England) Florence Mardall		
15 June	Waterloo Open; Waterloo, England; Grass; Singles - Doubles	(United Kingdom) Miss Barton (United Kingdom) William Wethered; 6–4, 6–2	(England) Florence Mardall (United Kingdom) Jacob Gaitskell Brown		
15 June	Scottish Championships; Dyvour Club; Edinburgh, Scotland; Grass; Singles - Doubles	(Ireland) Connie Butler; 6–3, 6–3	(England) Miss Jones	(England) Ann Dod (Scotland) Miss Scovell	
15 June	Scottish Championships; Dyvour Club; Edinburgh, Scotland; Grass; Singles - Doubles	Challenger (Scotland) Lottie Paterson		(England) Ann Dod (Scotland) Miss Scovell	
15 June	U.S. National Championships; Philadelphia Cricket Club; Philadelphia, United States; Grass; Singles - Doubles	(United States) Bertha Townsend; 7–5, 6–2	(United States) Helen Day Harris	(United States) D.F. Butterfield (United States) Grace Roosevelt	(United States) Anna C. Smith (United States) Rebecca H. Lycett (United States) Laura Knight (United States) Marion Wright
15 June	U.S. National Championships; Philadelphia Cricket Club; Philadelphia, United States; Grass; Singles - Doubles	Challenger (United States) Lida Voorhees		(United States) D.F. Butterfield (United States) Grace Roosevelt	(United States) Anna C. Smith (United States) Rebecca H. Lycett (United States) Laura Knight (United States) Marion Wright
15 June	U.S. National Championships; Philadelphia Cricket Club; Philadelphia, United States; Grass; Singles - Doubles	(United States) Margarette Ballard (United States) Bertha Townsend; 6–0, 6–2	(United States) Marion Wright (United States) Laura Knight	(United States) D.F. Butterfield (United States) Grace Roosevelt	(United States) Anna C. Smith (United States) Rebecca H. Lycett (United States) Laura Knight (United States) Marion Wright
15 June	Welsh Championships; Penarth LTC; Penarth, Wales; Grass; Singles - Doubles	(United Kingdom) Miss Pope; 6–0, 6–2	(United Kingdom) Mary Sweet-Escott		
22 Jun	Kent All-Comers' Championships; Beckenham, England; Grass; Singles - Doubles	(United Kingdom) Maud Shackle; 6–3, 7–5	(England) Miss Howes	(United Kingdom) Gertrude Mellersh (United Kingdom) Mrs Rhodes	(England) Amy Tabor
22 Jun	Kent All-Comers' Championships; Beckenham, England; Grass; Singles - Doubles	Challenger (England) May Jacks (holder)		(United Kingdom) Gertrude Mellersh (United Kingdom) Mrs Rhodes	(England) Amy Tabor
22 Jun	Kent All-Comers' Championships; Beckenham, England; Grass; Singles - Doubles	(England) May Jacks (United Kingdom) Herbert Yockney; 6–3, 6–1	(United Kingdom) Maud Shackle (England) William Taylor	(United Kingdom) Gertrude Mellersh (United Kingdom) Mrs Rhodes	(England) Amy Tabor
22 Jun	Northern Championships; Northern LTC; Manchester, England; Grass; Singles - Doubles	(England) Lottie Dod; 6–8, 6–3, 6–3	(United Kingdom) Bertha Steedman	(United Kingdom) Mary Steedman (England) Beatrice Wood	(Ireland) Connie Butler (England) Katherine Hill (United Kingdom) N. Pope
22 Jun	Northern Championships; Northern LTC; Manchester, England; Grass; Singles - Doubles	Challenger (England) Blanche Hillyard		(United Kingdom) Mary Steedman (England) Beatrice Wood	(Ireland) Connie Butler (England) Katherine Hill (United Kingdom) N. Pope
22 Jun	Northern Championships; Northern LTC; Manchester, England; Grass; Singles - Doubles	(United Kingdom) Bertha Steedman (United Kingdom) Mary Steedman; 9–7, 6–2	(England) Ann Dod (England) Lottie Dod	(United Kingdom) Mary Steedman (England) Beatrice Wood	(Ireland) Connie Butler (England) Katherine Hill (United Kingdom) N. Pope
22 Jun	Northern Championships; Northern LTC; Manchester, England; Grass; Singles - Doubles	(England) Lottie Dod (United Kingdom) John Charles Kay; 4–6, 6–3, 6–3	(England) Blanche Hillyard (England) Ernest Renshaw	(United Kingdom) Mary Steedman (England) Beatrice Wood	(Ireland) Connie Butler (England) Katherine Hill (United Kingdom) N. Pope
24 June	Edgbaston Open Tournament; Edgbaston CLTC; Edgbaston, England; Grass; Singles - Doubles	(England) Maud Watson; 6–1, 9–7	(United Kingdom) Mrs G.M. Elkington		
24 June	Edgbaston Open Tournament; Edgbaston CLTC; Edgbaston, England; Grass; Singles - Doubles	(England) Constance Bryan (England) Maud Watson; 6–1, 6–3	(United Kingdom) Miss Charles (United Kingdom) Miss L. Charles		
24 June	Edgbaston Open Tournament; Edgbaston CLTC; Edgbaston, England; Grass; Singles - Doubles	(England) Maud Watson (England) John Redfern Deykin; 7–5, 5–7, 6–4	(England) Lillian Watson (England) Henry Guy Nadin		
29 Jun	Lansdowne Lawn Tennis Tournament; Lansdowne LTC; Dublin, Ireland; Grass; Singles - Doubles	(Ireland) G. Crofton; 6–3, 7–5	(Ireland) Lena Rice	(Ireland) Miss Malcomson	
30 Jun	Orange Spring Tournament; Orange LTC; South Orange, United States; Singles - Doubles	(United States) F. Williams; 6–4, 6–2	(United States) Lida Voorhees		

=== July ===
Ended	Tournament	Winner	Finalist	Semifinalist	Quarterfinalist
5 Jul.	Lancaster Lawn Tennis Tournament; Lancaster, United States; Grass; Singles - Doubles	(United States) Miss Bursk; 6–2, 6–2, 6–1	(United States) Miss Calder		
13 Jul	Hull Westbourne Avenue Open Tournament; Hull, England; Grass; Singles - Doubles	(United Kingdom) Katherine Grey; 6–3, 6–1	(United Kingdom) Miss Barber		
13 Jul	Natal Championships; Pietermaritzburg, Colony of Natal; Grass; Singles - Doubles	(Colony of Natal) Mabel Grant; 6–0, 6–3	(Colony of Natal) Miss Murray		
14 Jul	Wimbledon Championships; AELTC; London, England; Grass; Singles	(England) Blanche Hillyard; 4–6, 8–6, 6–4	(Ireland) Lena Rice	(United Kingdom) May Jacks (United Kingdom) Bertha Steedman	(Ireland) Annie Rice (United Kingdom) Mary Steedman
20 Jul	Championship of Middlesex; Chiswick Park, England; Grass; Singles - Doubles	(United Kingdom) Mary Steedman; 6–4, 7–5	(United Kingdom) Bertha Steedman	(Scotland) E. Malcolm (England) Maud Shackle	(Wales) Edith Austin (England) Edith Cole (England) Ethel Gurney (United Kingdom) Mrs Robert
20 Jul	Championship of Middlesex; Chiswick Park, England; Grass; Singles - Doubles	(United Kingdom) Bertha Steedman (United Kingdom) Mary Steedman; 7–5, 6–1	(England) Blanche Hillyard (England) Ethel Gurney	(Scotland) E. Malcolm (England) Maud Shackle	(Wales) Edith Austin (England) Edith Cole (England) Ethel Gurney (United Kingdom) Mrs Robert
20 Jul	Championship of Middlesex; Chiswick Park, England; Grass; Singles - Doubles	(England) Blanche Hillyard (United Kingdom) Dudley Field; 4–6, 6–4, 9–7	(United Kingdom) Mary Steedman (United Kingdom) Frederick A. Bowlby	(Scotland) E. Malcolm (England) Maud Shackle	(Wales) Edith Austin (England) Edith Cole (England) Ethel Gurney (United Kingdom) Mrs Robert
27 Jul	Yorkshire Association and County Open Tournament; Ilkley LTC; Ilkley, England; Grass; Singles - Doubles	(England) Mabel Boulton; 2–6, 6–2, 7–5	(England) Miss Crossley	(England) Dorothy Boulton (Ireland) L. Chatterton-Clarke	(England) Miss Crosby (United Kingdom) Mrs E.J. Crossley (England) Miss Crosby (England) Miss Hall (Scotland) Miss Moir
27 Jul	Yorkshire Association and County Open Tournament; Ilkley LTC; Ilkley, England; Grass; Singles - Doubles	Challenger (England) Beatrice Wood (holder)		(England) Dorothy Boulton (Ireland) L. Chatterton-Clarke	(England) Miss Crosby (United Kingdom) Mrs E.J. Crossley (England) Miss Crosby (England) Miss Hall (Scotland) Miss Moir
27 Jul	Yorkshire Association and County Open Tournament; Ilkley LTC; Ilkley, England; Grass; Singles - Doubles	(Ireland) L. Chatterton-Clarke (England) Beatrice Wood; 6–3, 6–4	(Scotland) Miss Moir (United Kingdom) Ethel Tannett	(England) Dorothy Boulton (Ireland) L. Chatterton-Clarke	(England) Miss Crosby (United Kingdom) Mrs E.J. Crossley (England) Miss Crosby (England) Miss Hall (Scotland) Miss Moir
27 Jul	Yorkshire Association and County Open Tournament; Ilkley LTC; Ilkley, England; Grass; Singles - Doubles	(England) Beatrice Wood (United Kingdom) James Baldwin; 6–1, 6–1	(England) Mabel Boulton (United Kingdom) Herbert Wilberforce	(England) Dorothy Boulton (Ireland) L. Chatterton-Clarke	(England) Miss Crosby (United Kingdom) Mrs E.J. Crossley (England) Miss Crosby (England) Miss Hall (Scotland) Miss Moir
27 Jul	Sewickley Lawn Tennis Tournament; Sewickley, United States; Grass; Singles - Doubles	(United States) Bessie Carpenter; 6–2, 6–1	(United States) C. McCleary	(United States) H. Carpenter (United States) B. Ward	(United States) Miss Blair (United States) Miss Gillmore (United States) A. Warden (United States) C. Whiting
28 Jul.	Ealing LTC Championship; Ealing LTC; Ealing, England; Grass; Singles - Doubles	(England) Charlotte Cooper def	(United Kingdom) A. Francesca Brown holder		

=== August ===
Ended	Tournament	Winner	Finalist	Semifinalist	Quarterfinalist
3 Aug	Northumberland County Championships; Constabulary Ground; Newcastle, England; Grass; Singles - Doubles	(England) Helen Jackson; 6–2, 6–4	(England) Alice Pickering	(Ireland) Connie Butler (England) Beatrice Wood	(United Kingdom) Gertrude Bracewell (England) Miss Clarke (England) Jane Corder (United Kingdom) E Dickenson
3 Aug	South of Ireland Championships; Limerick County CLTC; Limerick, Ireland; Grass; Singles - Doubles	(Ireland) Mary Lysaght; 3–6, 7–5, 7–5	(Ireland) Miss Smith		
3 Aug	South of Ireland Championships; Limerick County CLTC; Limerick, Ireland; Grass; Singles - Doubles	(Ireland) Miss Bayly (Ireland) M. Smith; 6–3, 7–5	(Ireland) Mary Lysaght (Ireland) Miss Smith		
3 Aug	South of Ireland Championships; Limerick County CLTC; Limerick, Ireland; Grass; Singles - Doubles	(Ireland) Miss Gavin (Scotland) G.H. Browning; 2–6, 6–4, 6–5, 6–1	(Ireland) Miss Brown (Ireland) M.W. Gavin		
8 Aug	Colchester Championship; Colchester, England; Grass; Singles - Doubles	(United Kingdom) Miss Norman; 6–2, 6–2	(United Kingdom) Helen Kersey		
8 Aug	Colchester Championship; Colchester, England; Grass; Singles - Doubles	(United Kingdom) Miss Norman (England) George Kensit B. Norman; 6–1, 6–3	(United Kingdom) Miss Huleatt (United Kingdom) R.E. Vaizey		
9 Aug	East Grinstead Open; East Grinstead, England; Grass; Singles - Doubles	(United Kingdom) Ivy Arbuthnot (United Kingdom) May Arbuthnot divided title			
9 Aug	East Grinstead Open; East Grinstead, England; Grass; Singles - Doubles	(United Kingdom) May Arbuthnot (United Kingdom) William J. Down; 6-4, 6-4	(United Kingdom) A Covey (United Kingdom) Wilberforce Eaves		
10 Aug	Exmouth Tournament; Exmouth LTC; Exmouth, England; Grass; Singles - Doubles	(England) Katherine Hole; 2–6, 7–5, 6–4	(Ireland) Lilian Pine-Coffin	(England) E. Peck (England) R. Wright	(England) Georgina Kindersley (Ireland) Beatrice Langrishe (England) Miss Shadbolt
10 Aug	Darlington Association Tournament; Darlington, England; Grass; Singles - Doubles	(England) Alice Cheese def	(England) Ann Dod		
10 Aug	Darlington Association Tournament; Darlington, England; Grass; Singles - Doubles	(England) Lottie Dod (United Kingdom) Kenneth R. Marley walkover	(England) Ann Dod (Scotland) John Galbraith Horn		
10 Aug	Sheffield and Hallamshire Tournament; Sheffield, England; Grass; Singles - Doubles	(United Kingdom) Miss Crossley; 6–5, 6–1	(United Kingdom) L. Clark		
10 Aug	Keswick and Lake District Lawn Tennis Tournament; Fitz Park; Keswick, England. Grass; Singles - Doubles	(Scotland) E. Malcolm; 6–3, 6–2	(United Kingdom) Miss Allen	(United Kingdom) Lydia Cheetham (United Kingdom) Ann Scowcroft	(United Kingdom) C. Baker (United Kingdom) E. Goffey (United Kingdom) E.J. Heelis (England) Miss Wybergh
10 Aug	Keswick and Lake District Lawn Tennis Tournament; Fitz Park; Keswick, England. Grass; Singles - Doubles	(Scotland) E. Malcolm (United Kingdom) Edgar John Chippendale; 6–2, 6–1	(United Kingdom) E. Goffey (United Kingdom) H.H. Edgecombe	(United Kingdom) Lydia Cheetham (United Kingdom) Ann Scowcroft	(United Kingdom) C. Baker (United Kingdom) E. Goffey (United Kingdom) E.J. Heelis (England) Miss Wybergh
17 Aug	East of England Championships; Felixstowe, England; Grass; Singles - Doubles	(United Kingdom) Ivy Arbuthnot; 6–3, 6–4	(United Kingdom) Helen Kersey		
17 Aug	East of England Championships; Felixstowe, England; Grass; Singles - Doubles	(United Kingdom) Ivy Arbuthnot (United Kingdom) William Cobbold; 6–4, 6–2	(United Kingdom) Helen Kersey (United Kingdom) Herbert Kersey		
17 Aug	South of Scotland Championships; Beech Grove Grounds; Moffat, Scotland; Grass; Singles - Doubles	(Scotland) E. Malcolm; 6–4, 8–6	(Scotland) Miss Scowcroft		
17 Aug	South of Scotland Championships; Beech Grove Grounds; Moffat, Scotland; Grass; Singles - Doubles	(Scotland) Miss Hill (Scotland) Miss Rooke; 6–2, 6–1	(Scotland) E. Malcolm (Scotland) Miss Scowcroft		
17 Aug	South of Scotland Championships; Beech Grove Grounds; Moffat, Scotland; Grass; Singles - Doubles	(Scotland) E. Malcolm (Scotland) Richard Millar Watson; 6–2, 2–6, 6–2	(Scotland) Miss Scowcroft (Scotland) Archibald Thomson		
17 Aug	British Columbia Championships; Victoria LTC; Victoria, Canada; Grass; Singles - Doubles	(Canada) Frances Arrowsmith def	(Canada) Anastasia Musgrave		
19 Aug	Derbyshire Championships; Buxton, England; Grass; Singles - Doubles	(United Kingdom) Bertha Steedman; 5–7, 6–4, 6–3	(Ireland) Louisa Martin	(Ireland) Connie Butler (United Kingdom) Mary Steedman	(Ireland) G. Crofton (United Kingdom) M. Goodman (England) Edith Gurney (England) Miss Pickthall
19 Aug	Derbyshire Championships; Buxton, England; Grass; Singles - Doubles	(United Kingdom) Bertha Steedman (United Kingdom) Mary Steedman; 6–4, 6–1	(Ireland) Louisa Martin (Ireland) Florence Stanuell	(Ireland) Connie Butler (United Kingdom) Mary Steedman	(Ireland) G. Crofton (United Kingdom) M. Goodman (England) Edith Gurney (England) Miss Pickthall
19 Aug	Derbyshire Championships; Buxton, England; Grass; Singles - Doubles	(Ireland) Florence Stanuell (Ireland) A.J. de Courcy Wilson; 8–10, 6–1, 6–3	(Ireland) Louisa Martin (United Kingdom) Percy Bateman Brown	(Ireland) Connie Butler (United Kingdom) Mary Steedman	(Ireland) G. Crofton (United Kingdom) M. Goodman (England) Edith Gurney (England) Miss Pickthall
20 Aug	Nottinghamshire LTA Tournament; Nottingham, England; Grass; Singles - Doubles	(England) Beatrice Wood; 1–6, 6–3, 6–1	(United Kingdom) Frances Snook	(United Kingdom) Miss Evans (United Kingdom) Jane Snook	Ethel Sturgess
24 Aug	Bournemouth Lawn Tennis Club Tournament; Bournemouth CLTC; Bournemouth, England; Grass; Singles - Doubles	(Ireland) May Langrishe; 6–4, 6–4	(United Kingdom) May Arbuthnot	(United Kingdom) Elsie Pinckney (United Kingdom) K Stretton	(United Kingdom) Alice Arbuthnot (United Kingdom) L. Elphinston (United Kingdom) M Hext (Ireland) Beatrice Langrishe
24 Aug	Bournemouth Lawn Tennis Club Tournament; Bournemouth CLTC; Bournemouth, England; Grass; Singles - Doubles	Challenger (England) Constance Bryan		(United Kingdom) Elsie Pinckney (United Kingdom) K Stretton	(United Kingdom) Alice Arbuthnot (United Kingdom) L. Elphinston (United Kingdom) M Hext (Ireland) Beatrice Langrishe
24 Aug	Bournemouth Lawn Tennis Club Tournament; Bournemouth CLTC; Bournemouth, England; Grass; Singles - Doubles	(United Kingdom) Miss Bryan (Ireland) May Langrishe; 6–2, 6–1	(United Kingdom) Ivy Arbuthnot (United Kingdom) Miss Everett	(United Kingdom) Elsie Pinckney (United Kingdom) K Stretton	(United Kingdom) Alice Arbuthnot (United Kingdom) L. Elphinston (United Kingdom) M Hext (Ireland) Beatrice Langrishe
24 Aug	Bournemouth Lawn Tennis Club Tournament; Bournemouth CLTC; Bournemouth, England; Grass; Singles - Doubles	(Ireland) May Langrishe (United Kingdom) Harry S. Barlow; 6–3, 6–1	(United Kingdom) May Arbuthnot (United Kingdom) E.B. Fuller	(United Kingdom) Elsie Pinckney (United Kingdom) K Stretton	(United Kingdom) Alice Arbuthnot (United Kingdom) L. Elphinston (United Kingdom) M Hext (Ireland) Beatrice Langrishe
24 Aug	Royston Tournament; Royston LTC; Royston, England; Grass; Singles - Doubles	No Ladies Singles			
24 Aug	Royston Tournament; Royston LTC; Royston, England; Grass; Singles - Doubles	(United Kingdom) Geraldine Buttanshaw (United Kingdom) Rosamond Buttanshaw; 6–3, 6–2	(United Kingdom) Hilda Gainsford (England) Miss Lucas		
24 Aug	Royston Tournament; Royston LTC; Royston, England; Grass; Singles - Doubles	(United Kingdom) Hilda Gainsford (United Kingdom) Osmond McMullen default	(United Kingdom) Ruth Buttanshaw (England) Roy Allen		
24 Aug	East of Scotland Championships; St Andrews, Scotland; Grass; Singles - Doubles	(Scotland) Miss Moir; 7–9, 9–7, 6–2	(Scotland) Miss E Malcolm		
24 Aug	East of Scotland Championships; St Andrews, Scotland; Grass; Singles - Doubles	(Scotland) Miss Bruce Johnston (Scotland) Miss Moir; 6–2, 6–1	(Scotland) Miss Malcolm (Scotland) Miss Purvis		
27 Aug.	Southern California Championships; Santa Monica Casino Courts; Santa Monica, United States; Asphalt; Singles - Doubles	(United Kingdom) May Carter; 6–5, 6–3	(United States) Miss G. Gilliland	(United States) R. P. Carter (United States) Miss Schumacher	
28 Aug	North of England Championships; Scarborough, England; Grass; Singles - Doubles	(United Kingdom) Edith Gurney; 6–4, 8–6	(England) Beatrice Wood	(Ireland) Connie Butler (England) Helen Jackson	(England) Mabel Boulton (England) C. Crosby (United Kingdom) M. Crossley
28 Aug	North of England Championships; Scarborough, England; Grass; Singles - Doubles	(United Kingdom) Miss Clark (England) Beatrice Wood; 6–0, 7–5	(England) Mabel Boulton (United Kingdom) Miss Hodgson	(Ireland) Connie Butler (England) Helen Jackson	(England) Mabel Boulton (England) C. Crosby (United Kingdom) M. Crossley
28 Aug	North of England Championships; Scarborough, England; Grass; Singles - Doubles	(England) Beatrice Wood (England) Arthur Hallward; 6–2, 6–3	(England) Helen Jackson (United Kingdom) George Brown	(Ireland) Connie Butler (England) Helen Jackson	(England) Mabel Boulton (England) C. Crosby (United Kingdom) M. Crossley
28 Aug	Saxmundham LTC Tournament; Hurts Hall; Saxmundham, England; Grass; Singles - Doubles	(United Kingdom) Winifred Kersey; 6–1, 6–5	(United Kingdom) Helen Kersey		
28 Aug	Saxmundham LTC Tournament; Hurts Hall; Saxmundham, England; Grass; Singles - Doubles	(Wales) Edith Austin (United Kingdom) R. Darling; 6–0, 6–3	(United Kingdom) Miss Hewetson (United Kingdom) J. Heweston		
28 Aug	Saxmundham LTC Tournament; Hurts Hall; Saxmundham, England; Grass; Singles - Doubles	(United Kingdom) Mary Wallich (United Kingdom) John Wallich; 6–4, 2–6, 6–2	(United Kingdom) K. French (United Kingdom) F.C. French		
29 Aug.	Singapore LLTC Autumn Open; Singapore, Straits Settlement; Grass; Singles - Doubles	(Straits Settlements) Mrs. Chaytor; 4–6, 6–3, 6–2	(Straits Settlements) Mrs. Vane		
30 Aug	Trefriw Open; Trefriw Sports Ground; Trefriw, Wales; Grass; Singles - Doubles	(Wales) Sarah Allen; 6–1, 4–6, 7–5	(England) Miss Cheetham	(England) Miss Pickthall	
30 Aug	Trefriw Open; Trefriw Sports Ground; Trefriw, Wales; Grass; Singles - Doubles	(England) Miss Pickthall (England) Roy Allen; 6–3, 6–3	(Wales) C. Jones (United Kingdom) Walter Mace Shipman	(England) Miss Pickthall	

=== September ===
Ended	Tournament	Winner	Finalist	Semifinalist	Quarterfinalist
7 Sep	Sussex Championships; Brighton College Ground; Brighton, England; Grass; Singles - Doubles	(Ireland) May Langrishe; 6–3, 6–2	(Ireland) Beatrice Langrishe	(England) Mrs Hill (United Kingdom) Emily Mocatta	(England) Constance Bryan (United Kingdom) Gertrude Mellersh (Italy) Despina Petrocochino (England) Lilian Watson
7 Sep	Sussex Championships; Brighton College Ground; Brighton, England; Grass; Singles - Doubles	(Ireland) Beatrice Langrishe (Ireland) May Langrishe; 6–4, 3–6, 6–0	(United Kingdom) Elizabeth Mocatta (United Kingdom) Harriet Mellersh	(England) Mrs Hill (United Kingdom) Emily Mocatta	(England) Constance Bryan (United Kingdom) Gertrude Mellersh (Italy) Despina Petrocochino (England) Lilian Watson
7 Sep	Sussex Championships; Brighton College Ground; Brighton, England; Grass; Singles - Doubles	(Ireland) May Langrishe (United Kingdom) Harold Stone; 6–1, 6–2	(United Kingdom) Emily Mocatta (United Kingdom) Horace Chapman	(England) Mrs Hill (United Kingdom) Emily Mocatta	(England) Constance Bryan (United Kingdom) Gertrude Mellersh (Italy) Despina Petrocochino (England) Lilian Watson
14 Sep	South of England Championships; Devonshire Park LTC; Eastbourne, England; Grass; Singles - Doubles	(Ireland) May Langrishe; 5–7, 6–2, 6–1	(England) May Jacks	(England) Winifred Kersey (England) Elsie Pinckney	(United Kingdom) D Hickson (Scotland) E. Malcolm (United Kingdom) Gertrude Mellersh (England) Violet Pinckney
14 Sep	South of England Championships; Devonshire Park LTC; Eastbourne, England; Grass; Singles - Doubles	(Ireland) May Langrishe (England) Harry S. Barlow; 7–5, 6–3	(Scotland) E. Malcolm (United Kingdom) Harold W. Carlton	(England) Winifred Kersey (England) Elsie Pinckney	(United Kingdom) D Hickson (Scotland) E. Malcolm (United Kingdom) Gertrude Mellersh (England) Violet Pinckney
14 Sep	Dieppe Open International; Dieppe L.T.C. Dieppe, France; Clay; Singles - Doubles	(Wales) Edith Austin; 6–0, 6–3	(England) M. Thorne	(England) Constance Bryan (England) Elsie Lane	

=== October ===
Ended	Tournament	Winner	Finalist	Semifinalist	Quarterfinalist
6 Oct	Scheveningen International Tournament; HLTC Leimonias; De Bataaf; The Hague, Netherlands; Cement; Singles - Doubles	(Netherlands) Mev. van de Poll def.	(Netherlands) M. Bol		
12 Oct	Queensland Championships; Greet Sports Ground; Brisbane, Australia; Grass; Singles - Doubles	(Australia) Mrs. Quinnell; 6–1, 6–0	(Australia) Miss. Earle		
12 Oct	Queensland Championships; Greet Sports Ground; Brisbane, Australia; Grass; Singles - Doubles	(Australia) Miss Lee (Australia) Mr. Haughton; 6–3, 6–1	(Australia) Miss Earle (Australia) Richard John Cottell		

=== November ===
Ended	Tournament	Winner	Finalist	Semifinalist	Quarterfinalist
18 Nov	Victorian Championships; Melbourne C.C. Grounds; Melbourne, Australia; Grass; Singles - Doubles	(Australia) Nellie A'Beckett; 6–3, 6–4	(Australia) Miss Raleigh	(Australia) E. Raleigh (Australia) Mabel Shaw	
18 Nov	Victorian Championships; Melbourne C.C. Grounds; Melbourne, Australia; Grass; Singles - Doubles	(Australia) Miss Raleigh (Australia) E. Raleigh; 6–4, 6–5	(Australia) Ellen M Mayne (Australia) Mackenzie	(Australia) E. Raleigh (Australia) Mabel Shaw	
18 Nov	Victorian Championships; Melbourne C.C. Grounds; Melbourne, Australia; Grass; Singles - Doubles	(Australia) Nellie A'Beckett (Australia) Henry F. De Little; 6–3, 7–5	(Australia) Ellen M. Mayne (Australia) Richard Ernest Shuter	(Australia) E. Raleigh (Australia) Mabel Shaw	

=== December ===
Ended	Tournament	Winner	Finalist	Semifinalist	Quarterfinalist
7 Dec	Corowa Lawn Tennis Tournament; Corowa, Australia; Grass; Singles - Doubles	(Australia) M. Sloane; 6–5, 5–6, 6–5	(Australia) Mrs. Hay		
16 Dec	Linwood Lawn Tennis Club Tournament; Auckland, New Zealand; Grass; Singles - Doubles	(New Zealand) E Gordon; 4–6, 6–3, 6–3	(New Zealand) M Simpson		
30 Dec	New Zealand Championships; Carisbrooke Cricket Ground; Dunedin, New Zealand; Grass; Singles - Doubles	(New Zealand) E. Gordon; 7–5, 7–5	(New Zealand) Ruth Orbell	(New Zealand) Miss Campbell (New Zealand) Mrs George Way	(New Zealand) Nina Douslin (New Zealand) Hilda Hitchings (New Zealand) Miss Grant (New Zealand) Fanny Ollivier
30 Dec	New Zealand Championships; Carisbrooke Cricket Ground; Dunedin, New Zealand; Grass; Singles - Doubles	(New Zealand) E. Gordon (New Zealand) Miss Harman; 6–1, 6–2	(New Zealand) Ruth Orbell (New Zealand) Miss Rattray	(New Zealand) Miss Campbell (New Zealand) Mrs George Way	(New Zealand) Nina Douslin (New Zealand) Hilda Hitchings (New Zealand) Miss Grant (New Zealand) Fanny Ollivier
30 Dec	New Zealand Championships; Carisbrooke Cricket Ground; Dunedin, New Zealand; Grass; Singles - Doubles	(New Zealand) Miss F. Rattray (New Zealand) A.E Gibbs; 9–7, 6–4	(New Zealand) Miss Smith (New Zealand) J.M. McKerras	(New Zealand) Miss Campbell (New Zealand) Mrs George Way	(New Zealand) Nina Douslin (New Zealand) Hilda Hitchings (New Zealand) Miss Grant (New Zealand) Fanny Ollivier

== Tournament winners (singles) ==
This is a list of winners by the total number of singles titles won for 1889 major titles in bold:

- (Ireland) Louisa Martin – Bath, Cheltenham, **Irish Championships** (**3**)
- (Ireland) May Langrishe – Brighton, Bournemouth, Eastbourne, (**3**)
- (England) Lottie Dod – Darlington, **Northern Championships**, (**2**)
- (United Kingdom) Ivy Arbuthnot – East Grinstead, Felixstowe, (**2**)
- (New Zealand) E Gordon – Auckland II, Dunedin II, (**2**)
- (Colony of Natal) Mabel Grant – Hamilton, Pietermaritzburg, (**2**)
- (Australia) Ellen M Mayne – Geelong, Sydney, (**2**)
- (Scotland) E. Malcolm – Keswick, Moffat, (**2**)
- (United States) Lida Voorhees – Livingston, Wissahickon, (**2**)
- (United States) Bertha Townsend – **U.S.National Championships**, (**1**)
- (England) Constance Bryan – Cannes, (**1**)
- (New Zealand) R. Orbell – Dunedin, (**1**)
- (England) Mrs Bruce-Johnston – Pau, (**1**)
- (Straits Settlements) Mrs. Rowell – Singapore, (**1**)
- (India) Miss Nicholas – Madras, (**1**)
- (Ireland) Florence Stanuell – Dublin, (**1**)
- (Scotland) Lottie Paterson – Edinburgh II, (**1**)
- (England) May Jacks – London, (**1**)
- (United Kingdom) Mary Pick – Waterloo, (**1**)
- (Ireland) Connie Butler – Edinburgh, (**1**)
- (United Kingdom) Miss Pope – Penarth, (**1**)
- (England) Maud Shackle – Beckenham, (**1**)
- (England) Maud Watson – Edgbaston, (**1**)
- (England) Blanche Hillyard – **Wimbledon Championships**, (**1**)
- (United Kingdom) Katherine Grey – Hull, (**1**)
- (United Kingdom) Mary Steedman – Chiswick Park, (**1**)
- (England) Mabel Boulton – Ilkley, (**1**)
- (England) Helen Jackson – Newcastle, (**1**)
- (United Kingdom) Miss Norman – Colchester, (**1**)
- (England) Katherine Hole – Exmouth, (**1**)
- (England) Alice Cheese – Darlington, (**1**)
- (United Kingdom) Miss Crossley – Sheffield, (**1**)
- (Canada) Frances Arrowsmith – Victoria, (**1**)
- (United Kingdom) Bertha Steedman – Buxton, (**1**)
- (England) Beatrice Wood – Nottingham, (**1**)
- (Scotland) Miss. Moir – St Andrews, (**1**)
- (United Kingdom) Edith Gurney – Scarborough, (**1**)
- (United Kingdom) Winifred Kersey – Saxmundham, (**1**)
- (Ireland) G. Crofton – Dublin, (**1**)
- (United States) F. Williams – South Orange, (**1**)
- (United States) Miss Bursk – Lancaster, (**1**)
- (Wales) Sarah Allen – Trefriw, (**1**)
- (United States) Bessie Carpenter – Sewickley, (**1**)
- (England) Charlotte Cooper – Ealing, (**1**)
- (United Kingdom) May Carter – Santa Monica, (**1**)
- (Straits Settlements) Mrs. Chaytor – Singapore II, (**1**)
- (Wales) Edith Austin – Dieppe, (**1**)
- (Netherlands) Mev. van de Poll – Scheveningen, (**1**)
- (Australia) Mrs Quinnell – Brisbane, (**1**)
- (Australia) Nellie A'Beckett – Melbourne, (**1**)
- (Australia) M. Sloane – Corowa, (**1**)

== Statistical summary ==
=== Singles ===
- Total Tournaments (63)
- Most Titles: (Ireland) Louisa Martin & (Ireland) May Langrishe (3)
- Most Finals: (Ireland) Louisa Martin (4)
- Most Matches Played: (England) Blanche Hillyard (16)
- Most Matches Won: (England) Blanche Hillyard (13)
- Match Winning %: (Ireland) Louisa Martin (85.7%) min 14 matches
- Most Tournaments Played: (Ireland) Connie Butler (7)

== Sources ==
- Bartlett, Michael and Gillen, Bob. (1981) The Tennis Book, edited by Michael Bartlett and Bob Gillen, Arbor House, New York, ISBN 0-87795-344-9
- Collins, Bud. Total Tennis:The Ultimate Tennis Encyclopedia, Sport Classic Books, Toronto, Canada, ISBN 0-9731443-4-3.
- Crips, Mark (10 May 2022). In Pursuit of the Slam: My Year Travelling to Tennis's Top Four Tournaments (5 ed.). Manchester: i2.i Publishing. ISBN 9781914933981.
- Garcia, Gabriel. "Season: 1889". The Tennis Base. Madrid, Spain: Tennismem SAL.
- Hughes, G.P. Dunlop Lawn Tennis Almanack And Tournament Guide, G.P. Hughes.
- Lowe, Sir F. Gordon. Lowe's Lawn Tennis Annuals and Compendia, Eyre & Spottiswoode. London, England.
- Robertson, Max (1974). The Encyclopedia of Tennis. London: Allen & Unwin. ISBN 9780047960420.
- Someren, Janine van (December 2010). "3: The Amateur Tennis Circuit". Women's Sporting Lives: A biographical study of elite amateur tennis players at Wimbledon. A thesis for the degree of Doctor of Philosophy. Southampton, England: University of Southampton Research Repository.
- Wallis Myers A. Ayre's Lawn Tennis Almanack And Tournament Guide, London, England.
