= 1893 women's tennis season =

Women's tennis tournament series

1893 Women's Tennis Season
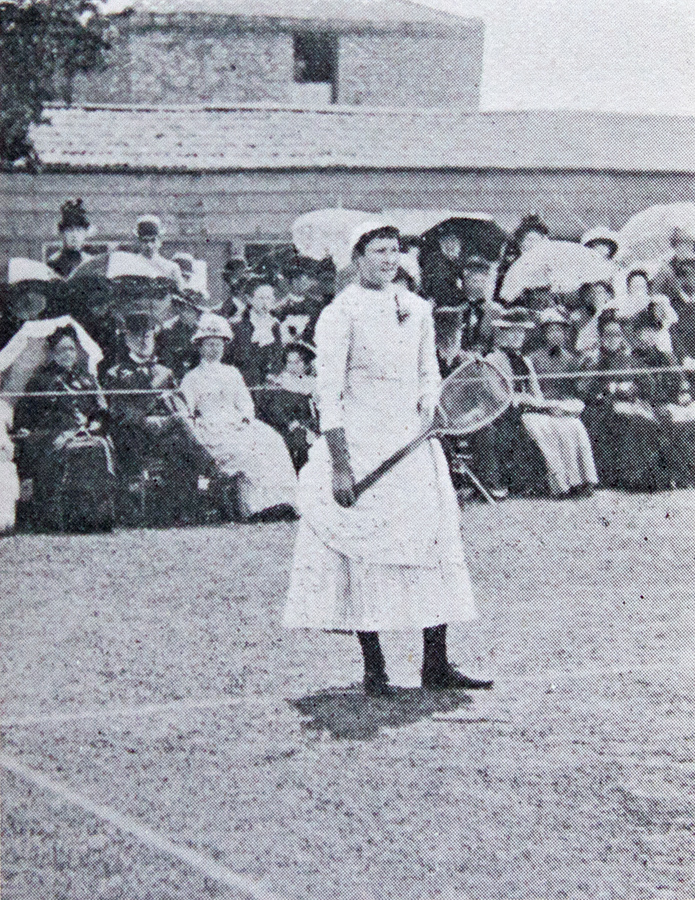
- Lottie Dod wins two major events the Northern Championships and Wimbledon Championships, but shes not the title leader this season Maud Shackle reached the All Comers final at Wimbledon and is title leader with five wins.

Details
- Duration: 30 January – 29 December
- Edition: 18th
- Tournaments: 81

Achievements (singles)
- Most titles: (United Kingdom) Maud Shackle (5)
- Most finals: (United Kingdom) Maud Shackle (6)

The 1893 Women's Tennis Season was a worldwide tennis circuit composed of 81 major, national, regional, provincial, state, county, metropolitan, city and regular tournaments.

The season began on 30 January in Epping, Victoria, Australia and ended on 29 December in Mount Eden, New Zealand.

== Season summary ==
The 1893 season began on 30 January in Epping, Victoria, Australia with the Epping Ladies Open that concluded on 4 February with singles event won by Annie Gibbson who defeated Miriam Bayles in three sets.

On 27 May at the first major event of the season for women the Irish Championships played at the Fitzwilliam Club in Dublin, Ireland, the singles event is won by Irelands Florence Stanuell who beat Englands Nora Pope in straight sets.

On 17 June at the second major event of the season, at the Northern Championships held at the Northern Lawn Tennis Club in Manchester, England the singles event is won by England's Lottie Dodd who collects a fifth and final Northern title defeating England's Blanche Hillyard in three tough sets.

Moving across the Atlantic to the third major tournament of the season the U.S. National Championships is played at the Philadelphia Cricket Club, Philadelphia, United States that concluded on 23 June was won by Aline Terry winning her first and only US championship title, when she defeats Augusta Schultz in straight sets.

On 20 July at the fourth and final major tournament of the year the Wimbledon Championships played at the All England Club, Blanche Hillyard defeated Maud Shackle the day before in the all comers final, in the challenge round she faced Lottie Dod the match goes to three sets with Dod emerging victorious and claiming a fifth and final singles title.

The 1893 women's tennis season concludes on 29 December at the New Zealand Championships meeting played at Mount Eden near Auckland, New Zealand, the singles title is won by M.F Spiers who beats A Nicholson three and five in the final.

== Season results ==
Key

Major events
National events
Professional events
Worldwide events

=== February ===
Ended	Tournament	Winner	Finalist	Semifinalist	Quarterfinalist
4 Feb.	Epping Ladies Open; Epping, Australia; Grass	(Australia) Annie Gibson; 2-1 sets	(Australia) Miriam Bayles		
25 Feb.	Southern California Midwinter Championships; Riverside, United States; Asphalt	(United States) Grace Gilliland def.	(United States) Miss Wilkes		

=== March ===
Ended	Tournament	Winner	Finalist	Semifinalist	Quarterfinalist
1 Mar.	Auckland LTA Championships; Auckland, New Zealand; Grass	(New Zealand) M. Nicholson; 3-6, 6-3, 7-5	(New Zealand) F. Spiers		
19 Mar.	Ceylon Championships; Nuwara Eliya, Ceylon; Clay	(United Kingdom) Mrs A.F. Broun; 4-6, 6-4, 6-1	(United Kingdom) Annette de Fonblanque		
26 Mar.	Otago LTA Tournament; Dunedin, New Zealand; Grass	(New Zealand) Ruth Orbell; 9-7 games	(New Zealand) Gertrude Rattray		

=== April ===
Ended	Tournament	Winner	Finalist	Semifinalist	Quarterfinalist
3 Apr.	South African Championships; Port Elizabeth, South Africa; Clay	(Colony of Natal) Mabel Grant; 6-1, 6-0	(Cape Colony) Mrs McLagan		
3 Apr.	Tasmanian Championships; Launceston, Australia; Grass	(Australia) Nina Rock; 6-1, 4-6, 6-3	(Australia) Annie Gibbson		
5 Apr.	Geelong Easter Tournament; Geelong, Australia; Asphalt	(Australia) Miss Simson; 6-5, 1-6, 11-9	(Australia) Miss Mackenzie		
6 Apr.	Launceston Easter Tournament; Launceston, Australia; Asphalt	(Australia) Nina Rock (2) def.	(Australia) Alice Rock		
14 Apr.	British Covered Court Championships; West Kensington, Great Britain; Wood (i)	(United Kingdom) Maud Shackle; 6-2, 1-6, 7-5	(United Kingdom) May Arbuthnot		
24 Apr.	South Australian Championships; Adelaide, Australia; Asphalt	(Australia) Maisie Parr; 6-0, 6-2	(Australia) Emma Ragless		

=== May ===
Ended	Tournament	Winner	Finalist	Semifinalist	Quarterfinalist
6 May.	Ealing Championships; Ealing, Great Britain; Grass	(United Kingdom) Charlotte Cooper def.	(United Kingdom) Anabel Critchley		
13 May.	Penang Golf Club Ladies Open; Georgetown, Straits Settlements; Grass	(Ireland) Mrs. O'Gorman	(Straits Settlements) Miss Lavinia Jones		
20 May.	New South Wales Championships; Sydney, Australia; Grass	(Australia) Ellen Mayne; 6-0, 6-0	(Australia) Mabel Shaw		
20 May.	Pollokshields Open; Pollokshields II, Great Britain; Grass	(United Kingdom) B. M. Watson; 4-6, 6-2, 6-3	(Scotland) Miss McGregor		
23 May.	Tynedale Open; Hexham, Great Britain; Grass	(United Kingdom) Charlotte Cooper (2); 6-4, 6-3	(Scotland) Lottie Paterson		
25 May.	Singapore LLTC Spring Open; Singapore, Straits Settlements	(Straits Settlements) Mrs Lovell; 4-6, 6-1, 6-2	(Straits Settlements) Mrs Salzmann		
27 May.	Irish Championships; Dublin, Ireland; Grass	(Ireland) Florence Stanuell; 6-2, 6-3	(United Kingdom) Nora Pope		
27 May.	Carnarvon Open; Carnarvon, Australia; Grass	(Australia) Masie Miller; 5-6, 6-2, 6-3	(Australia) Lizzie Miller		

=== June ===
Ended	Tournament	Winner	Finalist	Semifinalist	Quarterfinalist
3 June.	Lansdowne Championships; Dublin II, Ireland; Grass	(United Kingdom) Jane Corder; 6-4, 6-0	(Ireland) Miss Scott		
7 Jun.	Welsh Championships; Penarth, Great Britain; Grass	(United Kingdom) Ethel Cochrane; 6-1, 6-0	(United Kingdom) Miss Stoddart		
10 Jun.	Middlesex Championships; Chiswick Park, Great Britain; Grass	(United Kingdom) Maud Shackle (2); 4-6, 6-3, 6-4	(Wales) Edith Austin		
10 Jun.	Interclub Tennis Association Tournament; New York City, United States; Clay	(United States) Elisabeth Moore; 6-4, 2-6, 6-4, 3-6, 6-3	(United States) Helena Hellwig		
13 Jun.	North of Ireland Championships; Belfast, Ireland; Grass	(Ireland) Miss Shaw; 3-6, 6-0, 9-7	(United Kingdom) Jane Corder		
17 Jun.	Northern Championships; Manchester, Great Britain; Grass	(United Kingdom) Lottie Dod; 1-6, 6-3, 7-5	(United Kingdom) Blanche Hillyard		
17 Jun.	Kent County Championships; Blackheath, Great Britain; Grass	(United Kingdom) Amy Wilson; 6-3, 3-6, 6-1	(United Kingdom) Mrs Waring		
23 Jun.	U.S. National Championships; Philadelphia, United States; Grass	(United States) Aline Terry; 6-1, 6-3	(United States) Augusta Schultz		
24 Jun.	Kent Championships; Beckenham, Great Britain; Grass	(United Kingdom) Maud Shackle (3); 6-3, 6-4	(United Kingdom) Ruth Pennington-Legh		
24 Jun.	Hudson River Championships; Hastings-on-Hudson, United States; Grass	(United States) Mabel L. Ferris def. ?	(United States) Lida Voorhees		
25 Jun.	Yorkshire County Championships; Ilkley, Great Britain; Grass	(United Kingdom) Helen Jackson; 6-0, 2-6, 6-1	(United Kingdom) Charlotte Cooper		
29 Jun.	Llandudno Open; Craigside, Great Britain; Grass	(United Kingdom) Ellen Cressy divided title	(United Kingdom) Ida Cressy		

=== July ===
Ended	Tournament	Winner	Finalist	Semifinalist	Quarterfinalist
1 Jul.	Lafayette Association Tournament; Brooklyn, United States; Clay	(United States) Marion Meadley; 6-3, 4-6, 6-2, 7-5	(United States) Clara Chase		
1 Jul.	Middle States Championships; Mountain Station, United States; Grass	(Ireland) Mabel Cahill; 6-2, 6-1	(United States) Helena Hellwig		
8 Jul.	Burton-on-Trent Open; Burton-on-Trent, Great Britain; Grass	(United Kingdom) Miss King; 2-6, 6-3, 6-3	(United Kingdom) Ethel Valentin		
9 Jul.	London Championships; West Kensington II, Great Britain; Grass	(United Kingdom) Maud Shackle (4); 6-2, 6-1	(Wales) Edith Austin		
15 Jul.	Natal Championships; Pietermaritzburg, South Africa; Grass	(Colony of Natal) Mabel Grant (2); 6-3, 8-6	(Colony of Natal) Miss Brady		
16 Jul.	New York State Championships; Saratoga Springs, United States; Surface	(Ireland) Mabel Cahill (2); 9-7, 6-1	Elisabeth Moore (United States)		
20 Jul.	Wimbledon Championnships; Wimbledon, Great Britain; Grass	(United Kingdom) Lottie Dod (2); 6-8, 6-1, 6-4	(United Kingdom) Blanche Hillyard		
22 Jul.	Nottinghamshire Open; Nottingham, Great Britain; Grass	(United Kingdom) Kate Nunneley; 6-0, 6-1	(United Kingdom) Elizabeth Vaudrey		
26 Jul.	Warwickshire Championships; Leamington, Great Britain; Grass	(United Kingdom) Agatha Templeman; 6-4, 6-3	(United Kingdom) Alice Pickering		
28 Jul.	Canadian Championships; Toronto, Canada; Grass	(Canada) Maude Delano-Osborne; 6-8, 8-6, 6-2	(Canada) Mrs. Sydney Smith		
29 Jul.	Midland Counties Championships; Edgbaston, Great Britain; Grass	(United Kingdom) D. Morgan; 12-10, retd.	(United Kingdom) Blanche Hillyard		

=== August ===
Ended	Tournament	Winner	Finalist	Semifinalist	Quarterfinalist
5 Aug.	Northumberland Championships; Newcastle, Great Britain; Grass	(United Kingdom) Jane Corder (2); 6-2, 7-5	(United Kingdom) Charlotte Cooper		
10 Aug.	Isle of Man Championships; Douglas, Isle of Man; Grass	(Isle of Man) Lilla Ferrier; 6-0, 6-1	(Isle of Man) Miss Trotman		
10 Aug.	North of Wales Open; Abergele, Great Britain; Grass	(United Kingdom) Muriel Pick; 6-2, 6-1	(United Kingdom) Louisa Brown		
12 Aug.	Queensland Championships; Brisbane, Australia; Grass	(Australia) Mabel Taylor; 6-3, 6-2	(Australia) Miss Wallace		
12 Aug.	Darlington Open; Darlington, Great Britain; Grass	(United Kingdom) Charlotte Cooper (3); 6-0, 6-1	(United Kingdom) Miss Shaw		
12 Aug.	Pacific Northwest Championships; Tacoma, United States; Clay	(United States) Bessie Anderson def. ?	(United States) Miss Kershaw		
12 Aug.	Exmouth Open; Exmouth, Great Britain; Grass	(Ireland) Lilian Pine-Coffin; 6-4, 6-2	(United Kingdom) Constance Bryan		
12 Aug.	West of Scotland Championships; Wemyss Bay, Great Britain; Grass	(Scotland) H. Graham; 3-6, 6-2, 6-0	(Scotland) B. M. Watson		
12 Aug.	Eastern Counties Championships; Felixstowe, Country; Grass	(United Kingdom) Elsie Lane; 6-3, 11-9	(United Kingdom) Henrietta Horncastle		
17 Aug.	Saxmundham Open; Saxmundham, Great Britain; Grass	(United Kingdom) Elsie Lane (2); 6-3, 6-1	(United Kingdom) Henrietta Horncastle		
19 Aug.	British Columbia Championships; Victoria, Canada; Grass	(Canada) Frances Arrowsmith; 6-3, 4-6, 6-3	(Canada) Miss Legge		
19 Aug.	Championships of the Midland Counties; Parsonstown, Ireland; Grass	(Ireland) Helen Garvey divided title	(Ireland) Mrs Kirkwood		
20 Aug.	Kebo Valley Open; Bar Harbor, United States; Grass	(United States) Miss Goodfellow; 6-2, 6-1, 6-2	(United States) Miss Gibson		
20 Aug.	Southern California Championships; Santa Monica, United States; Asphalt	(United Kingdom) May Carter	(United States) Fannie Shoemaker		
24 Aug.	Scheveningen International; Scheveningen, Netherlands; Clay	(United Kingdom) N. Hart; 6-4, 6-1	(Netherlands) A. Blom-van Lennep		
24 Aug.	Maritime Provinces Championships; St. John, Canada; Grass	(Canada) Mrs GK McLeod def. ?	(Canada) Miss Powys		
26 Aug.	North of England Championships; Scarborough, Great Britain; Grass	(United Kingdom) L. Chatterton-Clarke; 6-4, 2-6, 6-2	(United Kingdom) May Arbuthnot		
26 Aug.	Scottish Championships; St. Andrews, Great Britain; Grass	(United Kingdom) Jane Corder (3)	(Scotland) Lilla Moir		
30 Aug.	Gore Court Championships; Sittingbourne, Great Britain; Grass	(United Kingdom) F. Malden; 4-6, 6-3, 6-4	(United Kingdom) A. Malden		
31 Aug.	Hilversum International; Hilversum, Netherlands; Cement	(Netherlands) C. van Lennep; 6-2, 6-4	(Netherlands) F. Blijdenstein		
31 Aug.	Homburg Spa Tournament; Bad Homburg, Germany; Clay	(United Kingdom) Miss Everett; 6-3, 6-2	(Germany) Sabine Pollen		

=== September ===
Ended	Tournament	Winner	Finalist	Semifinalist	Quarterfinalist
2 Sep.	North of Scotland Championships; Elgin, Great Britain; Clay	(Scotland) Miss Forsyth; 7-5, 6-0	(Scotland) C. M. Culbard		
3 Sep.	Niagara International Championship; Niagara-on-the-Lake, Canada; Grass	(Canada) Maude Delano-Osborne (2); 6-8, 6-3, 6-3	(Canada) Mrs. Sydney Smith		
4 Sep.	Delaware Field Club Open; Elsmere, United States; Clay	(United States) B. Negendank; 6-3, 6-1, 2-6, 6-2	(United States) Anna W. Hoopes		
6 Sep.	Singapore LLTC Autumn Open; Singapore II, Straits Settlement; Grass	(Singapore in the Straits Settlements) Mrs Lovell (2); 6-3, 6-5	(Singapore in the Straits Settlements) Mrs. Kynnersley		
9 Sep.	Sussex Championships; Brighton, Great Britain; Grass	(United Kingdom) Blanche Hillyard (2); 6-1, 6-4	(United Kingdom) Maud Shackle		
9 Sep.	Pacific Coast Championships; San Rafael, United States; Asphalt	(United States) Bee Hooper; 9-7, 6-4, 3-6, 9-11, 7-5	(United States) Susie Morgan		
9 Sep.	Trefriw Open; Trefriw, Great Britain; Grass	(United Kingdom) Miss Stoneax; 6-4, retd.	(United Kingdom) Mrs Ashwell		
9 Sep.	Narragansett Open; Narragansett Pier, United States; Clay	(United States) Miss Tayler; 6-2, 6-3, 4-6, 9-7	(United States) Mrs Astor		
10 Sep.	Dinard Ladies Cup; Dinard, France; Clay	(France) Hélène Prévost; 2-6, 6-2, 6-3	(United Kingdom) Margaret Manley-Sims		
18 Sep.	South of England Championships; Eastbourne, Great Britain; Grass	(United Kingdom) Blanche Hillyard (3); 6-1, 4-6, 15-13	(United Kingdom) Maud Shackle		
19 Sep.	Sleepy Hallow T.C. Open; Tarrytown, United States; Clay	(United States) Bertha Silver; 6-4, 6-1, 6-2	(United States) Miss Moore		
22 Sep.	Staten Island Ladies Club Open; Livingston, United States; Grass	(United States) Aline Terry (2); 9-7, 6-3	(United States) Elisabeth Moore		
23 Sep.	Boulogne International Championship; Boulogne-sur-Mer, France; Clay	(United Kingdom) Jane Corder (4); 6-0, 6-2, 6-2	(United Kingdom) Mrs White		
23 Sep.	Yonkers TC Ladies Open; Yonkers, United States; Clay	(United States) Bertha Silver (2); 6-2, 6-2, 6-1	(United States) Miss Fitch		

=== October ===
Ended	Tournament	Winner	Finalist	Semifinalist	Quarterfinalist
7 Oct.	Strathfield Ladies Open; Strathfield, Australia; Asphalt	(Australia) C. Dransfield; 6-2, 6-4	(Australia) M. Dransfield		
12 Oct.	South Yarra Ladies Open; South Yarra, Australia; Grass	(Australia) Ellen Mayne (2) def. ?	(Australia)		

=== November ===
Ended	Tournament	Winner	Finalist	Semifinalist	Quarterfinalist
24 Nov.	Victorian Championships; Melbourne, Australia; Asphalt	(Australia) C. Peach; 6-4, 2-6, 6-4	(Australia) Edith Raleigh		

=== December ===
Ended	Tournament	Winner	Finalist	Semifinalist	Quarterfinalist
29 Dec.	New Zealand Championships; Mount Eden, New Zealand; Grass	(New Zealand) M.F Spiers; 6-3, 7-5	(New Zealand) A Nicholson		

== Tournament winners ==
winners are listed by total titles won major events are in bold.

- (United Kingdom) Maud Shackle, Beckenham, Chiswick Park, Surbiton, West Kensington, West Kensington II (5)
- (United Kingdom) Jane Corder, Boulogne-sur-Mer, Dublin II, Newcastle, St. Andrews (4)
- (United Kingdom) Charlotte Cooper, Darlington, Ealing, Hexham, (3)
- (United Kingdom) Blanche Hillyard, Brighton, Buxton, Eastbourne (3)
- (United Kingdom) Lottie Dod, **Northern Championships**, **Wimbledon Championships**, (2)
- (Australia) Nina Rock, Launceston, Launceston II, (2)
- (Canada) Maude Delano-Osborne, Niagara-on-the-Lake, Toronto, (2)
- (United Kingdom) Elsie Lane, Felixstowe, Saxmundham, (2)
- (United States) Aline Terry, Livingston, **U S. National Championships**, (2)
- (Australia) Ellen Mayne, South Yarra, Sydney, (2)
- (Ireland) Mabel Cahill, Mountain Station, Saratoga Springs, (2)
- (Straits Settlements) Mrs Lovell, Singapore, Singapore II, (2)
- (Colony of Natal) Mabel Grant, Pietermaritzburg, Port Elizabeth, (2)
- (United States) Bertha Silver, Tarrytown, Yonkers, (2)
- (Ireland) Florence Stanuell, **Irish Championships** (1)

Note: 48 women each won (1) singles title.

== Season statistics ==
Category	Player	Result/Count
Most Singles Titles	(United Kingdom) Maud Shackle	5
Most Singles Finals	(United Kingdom) Maud Shackle	6
Most Singles Matches Played	(United Kingdom) Maud Shackle	29
Most Singles Matches Won	(United Kingdom) Maud Shackle	24
Best Win-Loss Record	(United Kingdom) Lottie Dod	14–0 (100%)

== Sources ==
- Barrett, John (2014). Wimbledon: The Official History (4th ed.). Vision Sports Publishing. ISBN 9-781909-534230.
- British Newspaper Archive
- Collins, Bud (2016). The Bud Collins History of Tennis (3rd ed.). New York: New Chapter Press. ISBN 978-1-937559-38-0.
- Google News Archive
- Robertson, Max (1974). The Encyclopedia of Tennis. New York City: Viking Press. ISBN 9780670294084.
- Whittelsey, Joseph T. (1894). Wright and Ditson Lawn Tennis Guide. Tournaments and Championships 1893. Boston: Wright and Ditson Publishers.
