= Constance Bryan =

English tennis player

- Country (sports): United Kingdom
- Born: England
- Died: England
- Turned pro: 1885 (amateur circuit)
- Retired: 1894

Singles
- Career titles: 3

Grand Slam singles results
- Wimbledon: SF (1894)

Constance Bryan was a British tennis player during the late 19th century. She was a singles semi finalist at the Irish Championships in 1888 and the Wimbledon Championships in 1894. She was active from 1885 to 1894 and won 3 singles titles.

== Career ==
A versatile all surface player who won titles on both grass and clay courts Constance played her first known singles event in 1885 at the Wimbledon Championships where she reached the quarter finals before losing to E.F. Hudson. The same year she reached finals of the Sussex County Lawn Tennis Tournament played on outdoor asphalt courts at the Hove Rink in Brighton, and won the mixed pairs event with Charles Ross.

In 1887 she won the Bournemouth Lawn Tennis Club Tournament (later known as the Hampshire Championships) against Irish player Beatrice Langrishe. The same year she took part in the Cannes Beau Site Hotel Tournament mixed doubles event partnered with Ernest Renshaw where they won that title against Edith Gurney and Harry Grove. In 1888 she took part in the Irish Lawn Tennis Championships in Dublin where she made it to the semi finals before losing to May Langrishe.

In 1889 she traveled to France to take part in a number of tournaments including the Cannes Beau Site Hotel Tournament in Cannes and played on clay where she won the title against Elsie Lane, the same year she reached the semi finals of the Dieppe Open International where she lost to Edith Austin. In 1890 she won the Cheltenham Championships on grass at Cheltenham against Beatrice Wood, and the same year she was a finalist in the women's doubles at the West of England Championships in Bath, partnering Nora Pope where they lost to the Irish pair of Louisa Martin and Florence Stanuell. In 1892 she reached the semi finals of the South of England Championships losing to eventual winner Bertha Steedman.

In addition she was a three time losing finalist at the Exmouth Open in 1888 to Blanche Hillyard and in 1892 and 1893 to Lilian Pine-Coffin. In 1894 she entered the Wimbledon Championships draw again nine years after she last competed there, and reached the semi finals before losing to Blanche Hillyard, this would be her final tournament.
