= Mary Steedman =

British tennis player (1867–1921)

- Country (sports): United Kingdom
- Born: March 1867 Ercall Magna, Shropshire, England
- Died: 29 July 1921 (age 54) Truro, Cornwall, England
- Turned pro: 1885 (amateur circuit)
- Retired: 1894

Singles
- Career titles: 3

Grand Slam singles results
- Wimbledon: SF (1890)

Mary Steedman (married name Vane) (March 1867 – 29 July 1921) was a British tennis player during the late 19th century who won the Northern Championships in 1890 and was a semi finalist at the Wimbledon Championships the same year. She was active from 1885 to 1894 and won 3 career singles titles.

== Career ==
Mary played her first tournament in July 1885 at the Midland Counties Championship Cup at Edgbaston where she reached the final and lost to Margaret Bracewell, she did however win the women's doubles event with her sister Bertha Steedman. In 1886 she reached the semi finals of the Derbyshire Championships but lost to May Langrishe. In 1888 she reached the quarter finals of Irish Championships.

In 1889 she played at the Wimbledon Championships where she reached the quarter finals before losing to May Jacks. the same year she won singles title at the Middlesex Championships at Chiswick Park against her sister Bertha, and they both won the women's doubles event.

In 1890 she won her first and only major tournament at the Northern Championships when holder Lottie Dod conceded the title by a walkover, she then reached the semi finals at the Wimbledon Championships the same year. She also successfully defended her Middlesex title against May Jacks. The same season she reached the finals of the Derbyshire Championships in Buxton but lost to Louisa Martin.

In 1891 she chose not defend her Northern singles title instead granting a walkover to Ireland's Florence Stanuell. In 1892 she played her final singles tournament at the South of England Championships in Eastbourne where she reached the final before losing to Blanche Hillyard. In 1894 she played her final doubles event at the Northern Championships in Liverpool where she won that title partnering with Blanche Hillyard.

In major doubles events she won North of England Championships in 1887, the Irish Championships in 1888 and two All England Championship titles held as part of the Northern Championships in 1889 and 1899 all partnered with her sister Bertha.

Mary and her sister Bertha were among the first who focused on playing volley which was the basis of their success.

== Personal life ==
Mary was fifth daughter of Edward B. Steedman, of High Ercall Hall. She married at High Ercall parish church on 24 June 1891 the Reverend Gilbert Holles Farrer Vane, younger son of Sir Henry Morgan Vane and younger brother of the 9th Baron Barnard, a Church of England clergyman, who was Vicar of High Ercall 1889-1895 and ultimately Rector of Wem, Shropshire, from 1895 until his death on 27 June 1905. The couple had one daughter, Mary Louisa Vane, born in March 1892, who died aged 17 on 29 June 1909.

She died on 29 July 1921 in Truro, Cornwall, England, aged 54. She was buried at Truro on same day as a memorial service was held for her at Wem parish church.
