= Derbyshire Championships =

Defunct tennis tournament
- Tour: Pre open era
- Founded: 1883
- Abolished: 1953
- Editions: 60
- Location: Buxton, Derbyshire, Great Britain
- Venue: Buxton Lawn Tennis Club
- Surface: Grass

The Derbyshire Championships originally known as the Championship of Derbyshire was a men's and women's grass court tennis tournament held at the Buxton Lawn Tennis Club, Buxton, Derbyshire, Great Britain from 1883 to 1953.

== History ==
A tennis tournament was originally held at Buxton Garden's as early as 1880. By 1883 the club had attracted more players and a men's championships was staged for the first time which was won by Minden Fenwick, he went on to win the New Zealand Championships three times from (1892–1894). In 1884 the owners of the Buxton Gardens, the Buxton Improvements Company, decided to stage a fully open event featuring men's and women's singles, with ladies' and gentlemen's singles played under the title 'Championship of Derbyshire', and a ladies' doubles played with the imposing title of 'The All-England Ladies Doubles'. The inaugural ladies' singles champion was Agnes Noon Watts. This latter championship was the first of its kind, being inaugurated before Wimbledon. In July 1914 the Derby and District Lawn Tennis Association was officially incorporated, this organisation later became known as the Derbyshire Lawn Tennis Association who were responsible for the staging of this event. The championships were not staged during World War I or World War II. It remained a featured tournament in the annual tennis tours. The tournament is still held today as a closed tennis event.

Notable winners of the men's singles included Grainger Chaytor (1892–1894, 1899), Wilberforce Eaves (1904), Laurie Doherty (1909), Adrian Quist (1936) and Franjo Kukuljević (1949). Previous women's singles champions included Louisa Martin (1886), Blanche Bingley Hillyard (1906), Elizabeth Ryan (1921) and Gem Hoahing (1948). The Derbyshire Championships ran until 1953 when it was abolished. The final men's singles champion was Nigel Cockburn from South Africa and the final women's singles title went to Britain's Mary Harris.

== Finals ==
=== Men's singles ===
Incomplete Roll:

Year	Champions	Runners-up	Score
1883	(United Kingdom) Minden Fenwick	(United Kingdom) Robert Parsons Earwaker	6-2, 6-3
1884	(England) Charles Walder Grinstead	(Ireland) Ernest Browne	5-7, 6–2, 6–2, 5–7, 6–4.
1885	(Ireland) Eyre Chatterton	(United States) James Dwight	6-2, 6–1, 6–3.
1886	(Ireland) Tom Campion	(United Kingdom) Percy Bateman Brown	5-7, 6–2, 6–1, 9–7.
1887	(Ireland) Tom Campion (2)	(Ireland) William Drumond Hamilton	6-2, 6–3, 6–4.
1888	(Ireland) Tom Campion (3)	(United Kingdom) Percy Bateman Brown	7-5, 6–4, 7–5.
1889	(United Kingdom) Percy Bateman Brown	(United Kingdom) T.G. Hill	6-2, 6–2, 6–1.
1890	(Ireland) Manliffe Goodbody	(England) Harry Sibthorpe Barlow	6-2, 7–5, 6–3.
1891	(Ireland) Grainger Chaytor	(United Kingdom) George Ball-Greene	6-1, 6–1, 6–3.
1892	(Ireland) Grainger Chaytor (2)	(Ireland) Tom Chaytor	w.o.
1893	(Ireland) Grainger Chaytor (3)	(England) Alfred Ernest Crawley	6-0, 6–2, 6–2.
1894	(Ireland) Grainger Chaytor (4)	(England) Harry Sibthorpe Barlow	6-1, 6–2, 1–0, ret.
1895	(Ireland) Harold Mahony	(Ireland) Grainger Chaytor	6-2, 3–6, 2–6, 7–5, 6–3.
1896	(United Kingdom) David Davy	(United Kingdom) J.A. Rooke	6-4, 6–4, 6–4.
1897	(United Kingdom) Sydney Howard Smith	(United Kingdom) George Hillyard	6-2, 6–2, 6–2.
1898	(United Kingdom) Sydney Howard Smith (2)	(Ireland) Grainger Chaytor	6-3, 6–0, 6–2.
1899	(Ireland) Grainger Chaytor (5)	(United Kingdom) Sydney Howard Smith	6-3, 6–3.
1900	(United Kingdom) George Hillyard	(United Kingdom) Frank Riseley	3-6, 6–4, 6–1, 6–4.
1901	(United Kingdom) Laurie Doherty	(United Kingdom) George Hillyard	6-4, 7–5, 3–6, 6–2.
1902	(United Kingdom) George Hillyard (2)	(United Kingdom) George Ball-Greene	2-6, 6–3, 6–8, 6–3, 6–2.
1903	(United Kingdom) Xenophon Casdagli	(United Kingdom) Walter Cecil Crawley	6-3, 7–5.
1904	(United Kingdom) Wilberforce Eaves	(United Kingdom) E.V. Jones	6-1, 6–3, 6–4.
1905	(United Kingdom) Xenophon Casdagli (2)	(United Kingdom) Ernest Charlton	8-10, 0–6, 6–4, 6–3, 6–2.
1906	(United Kingdom) Roy Allen	(United Kingdom) John Frederick Stokes	8-6 6–4.
1907	(United Kingdom) Alfred Leonard Bentley	(United Kingdom) Geoffrey Blenkinsop Youll	3-6, 6–2, 6–4. bi
1908	(United Kingdom) Xenophon Casdagli (3)	(United Kingdom) Arthur Wallis Myers	6-2 4-3 ret.
1909	(United Kingdom) Roy Allen (2)	(United Kingdom) Xenophon Casdagli	6-2, 7–5, 7–5.
1910	(United Kingdom) Charles A. Orpen Tuckey	(United Kingdom) C. Whitehouse	6-3, 6–3, 6–3.
1915/1918	Not held (due to world war one)		
1919	(South Africa) Louis Bosman Raymond	(Canada) Brian Norton	6-3, 6–3, 6–3.
1920	(France) Alain Gerbault	(United Kingdom) Roger Worthington	6-3, 6–3, 6–2.
1921	(Republic of Ireland) Henry Vere Shirley Dillon	(Republic of Ireland) Cecil Campbell	6-4, 6–4, 8–6.
1922	(Republic of Ireland) Edward Darcy McCrea	(United Kingdom) George Fletcher	6-4, 6–4.
1923	(Republic of Ireland) Edward Darcy McCrea (2)	(Portugal) José Domingo	6-3, 6–4.
1924	(United Kingdom) Charles Kingsley	(United Kingdom) Horace Keats Lester	6-1, 6–4.
1925	(United Kingdom) Gordon Crole-Rees	(United Kingdom) George S. Fletcher	6-2, 6–4.
1926	(United Kingdom) Charles Kingsley (2)	(United Kingdom) George S. Fletcher	6-2, 3–6, 6–4.
1927	(United Kingdom) Gordon Crole-Rees (2)	(United Kingdom) George Golding	2-6, 6–0, 6–1.
1928	(United Kingdom) Gordon Crole-Rees (3)	(South Africa) Norman Farquharson	3-6, 9–7, 6–1.
1929	(United Kingdom) Gordon Crole-Rees (4)	(United Kingdom) Donald Greig	5-7, 6–0, 7–5.
1930	(United Kingdom) Horace Keats Lester	(United Kingdom) Eric Conrad Peters	7-5, 6–2.
1931	(South Africa) Vernon Bob Kirby	(United Kingdom) Frank Wilde	6-2, 6–3.
1932	(New Zealand) James Edmett Giesen	(United Kingdom) Colin Ritchie	6-4, 5–7, 6–4.
1933	(South Africa) Vernon Bob Kirby (2)	(United Kingdom) Irving Wheatcroft	6-2, 6–2.
1934	(United Kingdom) Douglas Freshwater	(United Kingdom) Jimmy Jones	8-6, 3–6, 6–3.
1935	(United Kingdom) Jimmy Jones	(Republic of Ireland) George Lyttleton-Rogers	8-6, 3–6, 6–3.
1936	(Australia) Adrian Quist	(United Kingdom) Murray Deloford	6-2, 6–4.
1937	(Romania) Cristea Caralulis	(United Kingdom) Ronald Shayes	8-10, 10–8, ret.
1938	(United Kingdom) Murray Deloford	(United Kingdom) Jimmy Jones	3-6, 7–5, 6–4.
1939	(United Kingdom) Don Butler	(Argentina) Alejo Domingo Russell	9-7, 3–6, 6–4.
1940/1945	Not held (due to world war two)		
1946	(United Kingdom) Dennis Slack	(United Kingdom) C.F. Hall	6-3, 6–2.
1947	(Pakistan) Khan-Iftikhar Ahmed	(Romania) Constantin Tanacescu	4-6, 9–7, 6–3.
1948	(Socialist Federal Republic of Yugoslavia) Franjo Kukuljević	(Republic of Ireland) Matt Murphy	6-1, 6–3.
1949	(United Kingdom) John Horn	(United Kingdom) George Godsell	6-3, 6–3.
1950	(Australia) Geoff Brown	(South Africa) Brian Rooke	6-0, 6–1.
1951	(South Africa) Nigel Cockburn	(Hungary) Andras Kalman	8-6, 6–2.

=== Women's singles ===
Incomplete Roll:

Year	Champions	Runners-up	Score
1884	(United Kingdom) Agnes Noon Watts	(Ireland) Florence Stanuell	6-3, 6–3, 8–6.
1885	(United Kingdom) Blanche Bingley	(Ireland) Louisa Martin	6-3, 6–3.
1886	(Ireland) Louisa Martin	(Ireland) May Langrishe	6-3, 6–0.
1887	(Ireland) May Langrishe	(United Kingdom) Bertha Steedman	6-3, 6–4.
1888	(United Kingdom) Blanche Bingley Hillyard (2)	(Ireland) May Langrishe	7-5, 6–1.
1889	(United Kingdom) Bertha Steedman	(Ireland) Louisa Martin	5-7, 6–4, 6–3.
1890	(Ireland) Louisa Martin (2)	(United Kingdom) Mary Steedman	6-2, 6–4.
1891	(United Kingdom) May Marriott	(United Kingdom) Beatrice Wood	6-2, 6–2.
1892	(United Kingdom) Helen Jackson	(United Kingdom) Miss Vicars	6-0, 6–1
1893	(United Kingdom) Blanche Bingley Hillyard (3)	(United Kingdom) Helen Jackson	6-0, 6–1
1894	(United Kingdom) Blanche Bingley Hillyard (4)	(United Kingdom) Charlotte Cooper	6-4, 4–6, 7–5
1895	(United Kingdom) Helen Jackson (2)	(United Kingdom) Blanche Bingley Hillyard	6-3, 3–6, 6–3
1896	(United Kingdom) Blanche Bingley Hillyard (5)	(United Kingdom) Bertha Steedman	6-4, 3–6, 7–5
1897	(United Kingdom) Alice Simpson Pickering	(United Kingdom) Blanche Bingley Hillyard	6-4, 5–7, 6–4
1898	(United Kingdom) Ruth Dyas	(United Kingdom) Blanche Bingley Hillyard	6-2, 6–4
1899	(United Kingdom) Muriel Robb	(United Kingdom) Blanche Bingley Hillyard	6-3, 6–3
1900	(United Kingdom) Muriel Robb (2)	(United Kingdom) Blanche Bingley Hillyard	7-5, 6–3
1901	(United Kingdom) Blanche Bingley Hillyard (6)	(United Kingdom) Alice Simpson Pickering	6-2, 7–5
1903	(United Kingdom) Dorothea Douglass	(United Kingdom) Ethel Thomson	6-2, 6–1
1904	(United Kingdom) Dorothea Douglass (2)	(United Kingdom) Ethel Thomson	6-2, 4–6, 6–3
1905	(United Kingdom) Connie Wilson	(United Kingdom) Dorothea Douglass	4-6, 6–1, 7–5
1906	(United Kingdom) Blanche Bingley Hillyard (7)	(United Kingdom) Connie Meyer	6-4, 6–3
1907	(United Kingdom) Maude Garfit	(United Kingdom) Connie Meyer	3-6, 6–3, 6–4
1908	(United Kingdom) Charlotte Cooper Sterry	(United Kingdom) Maude Garfit	6-2, 6–2
1909	(United Kingdom) Maude Garfit (2)	(United Kingdom) Helen Aitchison	2-6, 6–2, 6–2
1910	(United Kingdom) Maude Garfit (3)	(United Kingdom) Helen Aitchison	w.o.
1911	(United Kingdom) Ethel Thomson Larcombe	(United Kingdom) Helen Aitchison	6-3, 6–1
1912	(United Kingdom) Ethel Thomson Larcombe (2)	(United Kingdom) Hilda Lane	6-0, 6–1
1913	(United Kingdom) Ethel Thomson Larcombe (3)	(United Kingdom) Winifred Longhurst	6-2, 6–1
1915/1918	Not held (due to world war one)		
1919	(United States) Elizabeth Ryan	(United Kingdom) Ethel Thomson Larcombe	3-6, 6–4, 7–5
1920	(United States) Elizabeth Ryan (2)	(United Kingdom) Ethel Tanner	6-1, 6–2
1921	(United States) Elizabeth Ryan (3)	(United Kingdom) M. Wright	6-0 6–1
1922	(United Kingdom) Kathleen McKane	(South Africa) Irene Bowder Peacock	divided title
1923	(United Kingdom) Blanche Duddell Colston	(United Kingdom) Phylis Radcliffe	6-0, 6–4
1924	(United Kingdom) Joan Fry	(United Kingdom) Kathleen McKane	6-4, 3-4 retd
1939/1945	Not held (due to world war two)		
1950	(South Africa) Doreen Wedderburn	(United Kingdom) Gladys Southwell Lines	6-0, 6–8, 6–4
1951	(United Kingdom) Billie Woodgate	(United Kingdom) Gladys Southwell Lines	6-0, 6–8, 6–4
1952	(United Kingdom) Billie Woodgate (2)	(Australia) Beryl Penrose	divided title
1953	(United Kingdom) Mary Harris	(United Kingdom) Rosemary Walsh	7-5, 5–7, 6–2

== Statistics ==
=== Mens singles ===
Most titles	(Ireland) Grainger Chaytor	4
Most titles	(United Kingdom) Gordon Crole-Rees	4
Most consecutive titles	(Ireland) Grainger Chaytor (1890–1894)	4

=== Women's singles ===
Most titles	(United Kingdom) Blanche Bingley Hillyard	7
Most consecutive finals	(United Kingdom) Ethel Thomson Larcombe (1911–1913)	3
Most consecutive finals	(United States) Elizabeth Ryan (1919–1921)	3

== Sources ==
- "Derbyshire Lawn Tennis Association". Derbyshire Tennis Association. LTA.
- The History of Tennis in Buxton, Buxton Tennis Club. Buxton. England http://www.buxtontennisclub.co.uk/history.
- Lake, Robert (2015). A social history of tennis in Britain. Milton Park, Abingdon, Oxon: Routledge. ISBN 9781134445578.
- "Tennis New Zealand 2012: Chapter: National Championships" (PDF). Tennis Kiwi. Tennis New Zealand. Retrieved 4 October 2022. Chapter: National Championships
