= May Langrishe =

Irish tennis player (1864–1939)

- Full name: Mary Isabella Langrishe
- Country (sports): United Kingdom
- Born: 31 December 1864 Ireland
- Died: 24 January 1939 (aged 74) Charmouth, England
- Turned pro: 1879 (amateur)
- Retired: 1892
- Plays: Right-handed (one-handed backhand)

Singles
- Career titles: 20

Grand Slam singles results
- Wimbledon: SF (1891)

Mary Isabella "May" Langrishe (31 December 1864 – 24 January 1939) was an Irish tennis player. In the most important tennis tournaments of the late 19th century she won the singles title at the presitigous Irish Championships held at the Fitzwilliam Lawn Tennis Club three times in 1879, 1883 and 1886, the Northern Championships in 1880, and was a semi finalist at the Wimbledon Championships in 1891. She was active between 1879 and 1892 and won 20 career singles titles.

== Career ==
Langrishe was born in Ireland on 31 December 1864, one of five daughters of Sir James Langrishe and his wife Adela de Blois Eccles. She was the great-great-granddaughter of Sir Hercules Langrishe, 1st Baronet. In 1879, she won the first Irish Championships at the age of 14 where she defeated Miss D. Meldon 6-2, 0-6, 8-6 in the finals. She won the singles title again in 1883 and 1886, and the doubles title with her sister Beatrice in 1884.

In 1880 she played at the Waterford Annual Lawn Tennis Tournament and won the singles title, she successfully defended her title again in 1881. In March 1882 she won the County Kilkenny Tournament and the later that year she competed at the inaugural Northern Championships for women held in Manchester where she won singles title, then the doubles title with her sister Adela Langrishe, and finally the mixed doubles title with William Renshaw. In 1883 she won the Irish Championships (now as a major tournament) singles title defeating her sister Beatrice Langrishe two sets to love. The same year picked up a second County Kilkenny title against Mary Lysaght.

In 1884 she failed to defend her Irish title going down in three straight sets to Maud Watson. The same year she was a finalist, at the Kilkenny County and City Tournament, but was beaten Mabel Cahill. In 1885 she won the Kilkenny County and City Tournament at her second attempt against a Miss Neville. Langrishe later played at the Wimbledon Championships where she lost to Maud Watson in the quarter finals stage.

In 1886 she won the Irish Lawn Tennis Championships singles title for the third time - defeating fellow country woman Louisa Martin in the final, she also won the mixed doubles title with Eyre Chatterton against her sister Adela Langrishe and Toler Garvey. At the Northern Championships that year she made it to the final, but was beaten by Lottie Dod. In August 1886 she won East of Ireland Championships title, held in Howth, Dublin against Isabella Smyth. She collected another Waterford title against Ann Gallwey. At the end of August she went to England to play at the Derbyshire Championships in Buxton, Derbyshire, she progressed through to the final stage, but lost to Louisa Martin.

In 1887 she returned to Buxton to play the Derbyshire Championships, this time she won the event against Bertha Steedman. In 1888 in the challenge round she failed to defend her Derbyshire title, where she beaten by Blanche Bingley Hillyard in straight sets. In early autumn she played at the Bournemouth Open Tournament, and won that title against Constance Bryan. In 1889 she won a second title at the Bournemouth Open tournament, against Constance Bryan. The same year she took part in the Sussex Championships at Brighton, where she defeated her sister Beatrice Langrishe in the final. She finished the 1889 season with another title win at the South of England Championships at Eastbourne defeating May Jacks.

In the mid summer of 1890 she competed at the Bournemouth Open for the third and final time, winning the title against Connie Bryan. In September she successfully defended her Sussex Championships title, against Maud Shackle winning in straight sets. At the end of that month she won South of England title for the second and final time against Edith Coleridge Cole. In July 1891 at only her second appearance at the Wimbledon Championships, Langrishe reached the semifinals of the all-comers tournament, where she was beaten by Blanche Hillyard, In 1892 she played her final tournament at the Sussex Championships where she defaulted in the first round.

Following her retirement from tennis she went to live in Dorset, England. May Langrishe died on 24 January 1939 at her home Hammonds Mead House, Charmouth, the same house in which Maud Watson would die seven years later.
