= Florence Stanuell =

Irish tennis player

- Country (sports): Ireland
- Born: 1861 Dublin. Ireland
- Died: 8 December 1936 (age 75) Chillenden, England
- Turned pro: 1883 (amateur circuit)
- Retired: 1899

Singles
- Career titles: 5

Doubles
- Career titles: 8

Florence Margaret Stanuell (1861 – 8 December 1936) was an Irish tennis player. She won singles titles at two of the four major championships of the 19th century, the Northern Championships in 1891 and the Irish Championships in 1893. She was active from 1883 to 1899 and won five career singles titles, and eight doubles tiles including four Irish Championships with Louisa Martin.

== Career ==
She played her first tournament in 1883 in the mixed doubles at the Irish Championships partnered with Vere St. Leger Goold where they lost in the first round to May Langrishe and Ernest Browne. Her first singles tournament final was in 1884 at the Derbyshire Championships where she lost to England's Agnes Noon Watts in straight sets. In 1885 she won the Darlington Association Tournament against compatriot Connie Butler. In 1886 she retained her Darlington title and also won the women's and mixed doubles events.

In 1887, Stanuell took part in her first major tournament at the Irish Championships in singles where she reached the quarter finals where she was defeated by English player Lilian Watson, she teamed up with Louisa Martin in the women's doubles event which they won against Maud Watson and Lilian Watson.

In May 1889 she won the singles at the Fitzwilliam Ladies Open tournament against Constance Butler, and women's doubles title. In June she reached the finals of the Championship of the West of England at Bath and the East Gloucestershire Championships at Cheltenham where she lost both to Louisa Martin. In 1891 she reached the final of the Irish Lawn Tennis Championships where she lost to Mollie Martin, and in June she advanced to her second major championship final of the season at the Northern Championships in Manchester where she won the title against Beatrice Wood. In 1892 she chose not to defend her Northern title, thus granting a walkover to Lottie Dod who took the title.

Florence Stanuell took part in virtually no more lawn tennis tournaments after 1893. With two exceptions other than in 1895, when she and Louisa Martin teamed up for the doubles event at the Irish Championships in late May. However, they were unable to add to their tally of four titles in this event, and in 1899 she travelled to Pitlochry to play at the Highland Championships where she won the singles title against Lottie Paterson. She retired from tennis in 1899 and died at the Rectory, Chillenden Kent, England on 8 December 1936 age 75.
