= Lansdowne Championships =

Irish tennis tournament

Defunct tennis tournament
- Tour: ILTF Circuit (1913-1967)
- Founded: 1889; 137 years ago
- Abolished: 1969; 57 years ago
- Location: Dublin, Ireland
- Venue: Lansdowne Lawn Tennis Club
- Surface: Grass

The Lansdowne Championships was a men's and women's international grass court tennis tournament founded in 1889 as the Lansdowne Lawn Tennis Tournament. The tournament was played at the private members Lansdowne Lawn Tennis Club, Dublin, Ireland. Also known as the Dublin Invitational for invited players, it was played annually until 1969 when it was discontinued as part of the ILTF Circuit.

== History ==
The Lansdowne Championships were first held in June 1889 the men's singles event was also valid as the County Dublin Championships and was won by Joshua Pim who beat Grainger Chaytor in the final. The tournament was played at the Lansdowne Lawn Tennis Club, Dublin, Ireland. It was played annually until 1969 when it was discontinued as part of the ILTF Circuit. The tournament was still being held as recently as 2019 as the Lansdowne Senior Club Championships.
