= Dieppe International Championship =

Defunct tennis tournament
- Tour: ILTF Circuit (1913–1966)
- Founded: 1888; 137 years ago
- Abolished: 1966; 59 years ago
- Location: Dieppe, France
- Venue: Club de tennis de Dieppe
- Surface: Clay

The Dieppe International Championship also known Championnat international de Dieppe also known as the Dieppe International Tennis Championship Cup was a men's and women's clay court tennis tournament founded in 1888 as the Dieppe LTC Tournament . The tournament was held at the Club de tennis de Dieppe, Dieppe, France and ran annually through 1966 when it was dropped from that schedule of the ILTF Circuit.

== History ==
In 1888 the first edition of the Dieppe LTC Tournament was held. That tournament was held annually until 1894 when it was discontinued. In 1906 the Club de tennis de Dieppe revived the tournament as the Dieppe International Tennis Championship Cup or (Coupe du Championnat international de tennis de Dieppe). the first winner of men's singles at that event was Charles Gouldesborough, and the women's event was won by Edith Maidment.

Previous winners of the men's singles title included; Walter Cecil Crawley, Anthony Wilding, Charles Percy Dixon, André Gobert, and Kevin Lonergan. Former winners of the winners singles title included; Edith Austin, Charlotte Cooper Sterry, Marguerite Broquedis, Simone Barbier and Lili de Alvarez. The tournament ran annually through from 1913 to 1966 as part of the worldwide ILTF Circuit when it was dropped from that schedule.
