= Geelong Easter Tournament =

Defunct tennis tournament
- Tour: ILTF (1913–1967)
- Founded: 1887; 139 years ago
- Abolished: 1967; 59 years ago
- Location: Geelong, Victoria, Australia
- Venue: Geelong Lawn Tennis Club
- Surface: Hard

The Geelong Easter Tournament also known as the Geelong Easter Championship was a combined men's and women's hard court tennis tournament founded in 1886 . The tournament was organised by the Geelong Lawn Tennis Club and played at Geelong, Victoria, Australia, annually as part of the ILTF Circuit until 1967, when it was discontinued.

== History ==
In 1887 the first Geelong Easter Tournament was held in Geelong, Victoria, Australia. The tournament featured two events: the main Geelong Easter Tournament and the Geelong Easter Handicap Tournament. The club also staged a Geelong Christmas Tournament at the end of the season. The Easter tournament ran annually as part of the ILTF Circuit until 1967, when it was discontinued. The Easter handicap tournament ran until the 1920s.
