= Irish Open (tennis) =

Irish Championships Irish Open
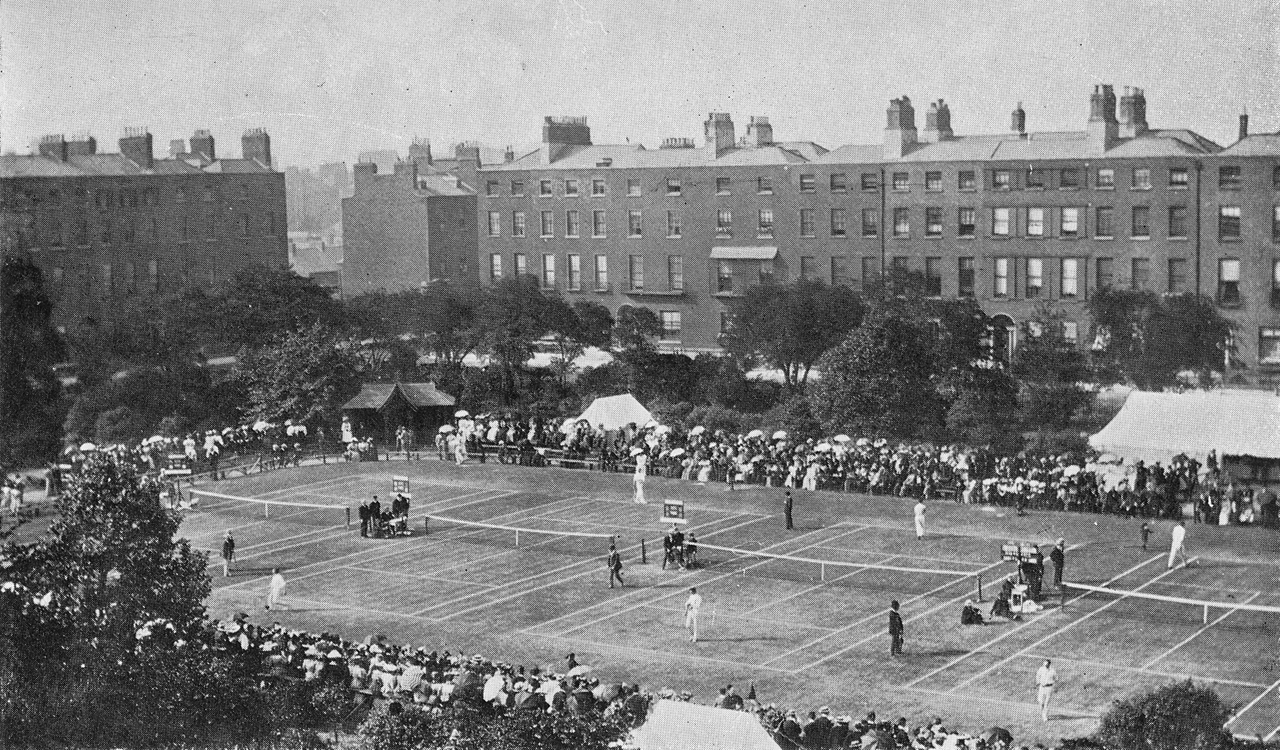

Defunct tennis tournament
- Event name: Irish Open
- Tour: ILTF World Circuit (1913–1969, 1974–1983) combined ILTF Grand Prix Circuit (1970–1974) men WTA Tour (1971–1973) women
- Founded: 1879; 147 years ago
- Abolished: 1983; 43 years ago
- Editions: 94
- Location: Dublin, Ireland
- Venue: Fitzwilliam Lawn Tennis Club; Fitzwilliam Square
- Surface: Hard (1879–1880); Grass (1881–1939, 1966–1983); Clay (1946–1965)

The Irish Open was a hard court tennis tournament founded in 1879 as the Irish Championships, a major tennis tournament of the late 19th to early 20th centuries. It was played at the Fitzwilliam Lawn Tennis Club in Dublin, Ireland. Also known as the Irish Lawn Tennis Championships it remained a major tennis tournament alongside Wimbledon and the Northern Championships until the early 20th century. It was the first tennis tournament to feature a Ladies' singles event. The tournament continued to be played under its original brand name until 1972, when it was rebranded as the Irish Open or the Carroll's Irish Open Championships (for sponsorship reasons).

Before the creation of the International Lawn Tennis Federation and the establishment of its world championship events in 1913, it was considered by players and historians one of the four most important major tennis tournaments to win, the others being Wimbledon, the U.S. National championships and the Northern Championships. The combined event was part of the ILTF World Circuit from 1913 until 1969. From 1970 to 1974 the men's event was an affiliated event on the ITF Grand Prix Circuit. The women's event continued as part of the ILTF World Circuit until 1972. In 1973 became part of the Women's Tennis Association (WTA) Tour for one season only before reverting back to the former tour. The men's edition was played until 1979, and the women's ended in 1983 when they both ceased to part of the top level world tennis circuit.

== History ==
The Irish Championships were first held in June 1879, two years after Wimbledon started. It was first staged at Pembroke Place, Dublin until 1880 when it transferred to Wilton Place where it remained until 1902. In 1903 the tournament moved again this time to Fitzwilliam Square. The championships began 2 June 1879 and had the distinction of being the first event to feature men's and women's singles and doubles tournaments as well as a mixed doubles competition. Prior to the creation of the International Lawn Tennis Federation and the establishment of its world championship events in 1913 it was considered by players and historians one of the four most important tennis tournaments to win, the others being Wimbledon, the U.S. National championships and the Northern Championships.

George Whiteside Hillyard writing his book Forty Years of First-class Lawn Tennis emphasising the importance of this tournament:

To win the Irish Championship was looked upon as quite on a par with winning at Wimbledon, and justly so:

— The Irish Championships, Forty Years of First-class Lawn Tennis (1925). Williams and Norgate, Ltd. London. p. 6.

The tournament changed its name to the Irish Open in 1972 and again it moved location to Appian Way, Dublin where it remained for the duration of its run. The tournament has been played on multiple surfaces throughout its history. The first two years, (1879–1880) were competed on hard courts. It was played on grass courts, (1881–1939). From 1946 to 1965, it was played on clay courts, and it returned to being played on grass again from 1966 until the tournament ended. The Irish Open is currently a tournament on the ITF World Tennis Tour, the lowest tier of professional tennis.

== Finals ==
Results include:

=== Men's singles ===
Year	Champions	Runners-up	Score
1879	(Ireland) Vere St. Leger Goold	(Ireland) Charles David Barry	8–6, 8–6
1880	(United Kingdom of Great Britain and Ireland) William Renshaw	(Ireland) Vere St. Leger Goold	6–1, 6–4, 6–3
1881	(United Kingdom of Great Britain and Ireland) William Renshaw (2)	(Scotland) Herbert Lawford	1–6, 6–4, 6–3, 6–1
1882	(United Kingdom of Great Britain and Ireland) William Renshaw (3)	(United Kingdom of Great Britain and Ireland) Ernest Renshaw	w/o
1883	(United Kingdom of Great Britain and Ireland) Ernest Renshaw	(Scotland) Herbert Lawford	3–6, 6–3, 7–5, 1–6, 6–3
1884	(Scotland) Herbert Lawford	(United Kingdom of Great Britain and Ireland) Ernest Renshaw	6–1, 6–4, 6–2
1885	(Scotland) Herbert Lawford (2)	(United Kingdom of Great Britain and Ireland) Ernest Renshaw	4–6, 6–2, 3–6, 6–3, 6–4
1886	(Scotland) Herbert Lawford (3)	(Ireland) Willoughby Hamilton	5–7, 6–4, 6–4, 7–5
1887	(United Kingdom of Great Britain and Ireland) Ernest Renshaw (2)	(Scotland) Herbert Lawford	7–5, 6–2, 9–7
1888	(United Kingdom of Great Britain and Ireland) Ernest Renshaw (3)	(Ireland) Willoughby Hamilton	6–4, 5–7, 6–4, 3–6, 6–2
1889	(Ireland) Willoughby Hamilton	(United Kingdom of Great Britain and Ireland) Ernest Renshaw	12–10, 6–1, 6–3
1890	(United Kingdom of Great Britain and Ireland) Ernest Lewis	(Ireland) Willoughby Hamilton	3–6, 3–6, 9–7, 6–4, 7–5
1891	(United Kingdom of Great Britain and Ireland) Ernest Lewis (2)	(Ireland) Joshua Pim	6–2, 6–3, 8–6
1892	(United Kingdom of Great Britain and Ireland) Ernest Renshaw (4)	(United Kingdom of Great Britain and Ireland) Ernest Lewis	1–6, 6–4, 6–3, 6–3
1893	(Ireland) Joshua Pim	(United Kingdom of Great Britain and Ireland) Ernest Renshaw	6–1, 6–4, 6–1
1894	(Ireland) Joshua Pim (2)	(Ireland) Thomas Chaytor	3–6, 1–6, 6–2, 6–2, 9–7
1895	(Ireland) Joshua Pim (3)	(United Kingdom of Great Britain and Ireland) Wilberforce Eaves	6–1, 6–1, 6–3
1896	(United Kingdom of Great Britain and Ireland) Wilfred Baddeley	(Ireland) Harold Mahony	6–1, 6–2, 3–6, 6–3
1897	(United Kingdom of Great Britain and Ireland) Wilberforce Eaves	(United Kingdom of Great Britain and Ireland) Wilfred Baddeley	1–6, 2–6, 8–6, 6–2, 6–3
1898	(Ireland) Harold Mahony	(United Kingdom of Great Britain and Ireland) Wilberforce Eaves	6–1, 5–7, 9–7, 8–6
1899	(United Kingdom of Great Britain and Ireland) Reginald Doherty	(Ireland) Harold Mahony	6–3, 6–4, 5–7, 6–4
1900	(United Kingdom of Great Britain and Ireland) Reginald Doherty (2)	(United Kingdom of Great Britain and Ireland) Arthur Gore	6–4, 7–5, 7–9, 7–9, 6–3
1901	(United Kingdom of Great Britain and Ireland) Reginald Doherty (3)	(United Kingdom of Great Britain and Ireland) Laurence Doherty	6–4, 4–6, r
1902	(United Kingdom of Great Britain and Ireland) Laurence Doherty	(United Kingdom of Great Britain and Ireland) Sydney Howard Smith	6–1, 6–4, 6–1
1903	(United Kingdom of Great Britain and Ireland) William Drapes	(United Kingdom of Great Britain and Ireland) James Cecil Parke	6–0, 3–6, 6–3, 3–6, 6–4
1904	(Ireland) James Cecil Parke	(United Kingdom of Great Britain and Ireland) Thomas Douglas Good	6–1, 6–2, 6–4
1905	(Ireland) James Cecil Parke (2)	(United Kingdom of Great Britain and Ireland) Alexander H. Porter	6–3, 6–3, 1–6, 6–3
1906	(United Kingdom of Great Britain and Ireland) Frank Riseley	(United Kingdom of Great Britain and Ireland) S. Douglas	6–2, 6–1, 7–5
1907	(United Kingdom of Great Britain and Ireland) Josiah Ritchie	(United Kingdom of Great Britain and Ireland) Thomas Douglas Good	0–6, 6–3, 6–4, 7–5
1908	(Ireland) James Cecil Parke (3)	(United States) Wylie Grant	4–6, 6–1, 4–6, 6–3, 6–0
1909	(Ireland) James Cecil Parke (4)	(United Kingdom of Great Britain and Ireland) Alfred Beamish	6–3, 6–4, 3–6, 2–6, 6–3
1910	(Ireland) James Cecil Parke (5)	(United Kingdom of Great Britain and Ireland) Alfred Beamish	6–1, 6–3, 8–6
1911	(Ireland) James Cecil Parke (6)	(United Kingdom of Great Britain and Ireland) Simon Frederick Scroope	6–3, 6–1, 6–1
1912	(Ireland) James Cecil Parke (7)	(United Kingdom of Great Britain and Ireland) George Alan Thomas	6–2, 6–1, 6–0
1913	(Ireland) James Cecil Parke (8)	(United Kingdom of Great Britain and Ireland) George Alan Thomas	6–2, 6–4, 6–3
1914	(United Kingdom of Great Britain and Ireland) Cecil John Tindell Green	(United Kingdom of Great Britain and Ireland) George Alan Thomas	7–5, 3–6, 6–3, 6–8, 6–3
1915–18	Not held		
1919	(United Kingdom of Great Britain and Ireland) Cecil J. Campbell	(United Kingdom of Great Britain and Ireland) Valentine Miley	6–1, 6–3, 6–3
1920	(United Kingdom of Great Britain and Ireland) Valentine Miley	(United Kingdom of Great Britain and Ireland) George Alan Thomas	2–6, 5–7, 6–3, 6–1, 8–6
1921	(United Kingdom of Great Britain and Ireland) Cecil J. Campbell (2)		
1922	Not held		
1923	(Australia) George Eric Mackay	(Republic of Ireland) F. Crosbie	7–5, 6–0, 6–1
1924	(Republic of Ireland) Louis Meldon	(Republic of Ireland) Edward McGuire	6–1, 6–0, 6–2
1925	(Republic of Ireland) Charles Frederick Scroope	(United Kingdom of Great Britain and Ireland) Maurice V. Summerson	6–3, 6–3, 6–0
1926	(France) Pierre Henri Landry	(United Kingdom of Great Britain and Ireland) Maurice V. Summerson	6–2, 6–1, 6–3
1927	(United Kingdom of Great Britain and Ireland) Gordon Crole-Rees	(United Kingdom of Great Britain and Ireland) Pat Hughes	6–2, 7–5, 3–6, 6–4
1928	(Republic of Ireland) George Lyttleton-Rogers	(Republic of Ireland) Dudley Pitt	5–7, 6–1, 6–8, 6–4, 6–2
1929	(United Kingdom of Great Britain and Ireland) John Olliff	(Republic of Ireland) George Lyttleton-Rogers	4–6, 6–3, 1–6, 6–2, 6–4
1930	(United Kingdom of Great Britain and Ireland) Harry Lee	(United Kingdom of Great Britain and Ireland) Pat Hughes	3–6, 1–6, 6–4, 7–5, 6–0
1931	(Republic of Ireland) Edward McGuire	(Republic of Ireland) Harry F. Cronin	6–2, 6–2, 6–3
1932	(United States) Sidney. B. Wood	(United States) Gregory Mangin	3–6, 6–3, 9–11, 6–3, 6–0
1933	(United States) David Jones	(United States) Clayton Burwell	6–3, 4–6, 6–2, 7–5
1934	(New Zealand) Camille Malfroy	(Republic of Ireland) George Lyttleton-Rogers	6–2, 6–3, 1–6, 1–6, 6–1
1935	(New Zealand) Alan Stedman	(New Zealand) Camille Malfroy	7–5, 6–2, 6–1
1936	(Republic of Ireland) George Lyttleton-Rogers (2)	(Republic of Ireland) Robert Mulliken	6–3, 6–2, 6–1
1937	(Republic of Ireland) George Lyttleton-Rogers (3)	(Republic of Ireland) Trevor G. McVeagh	6–1, 8–6, 7–5
1938	(United States) Owen Anderson	(Republic of Ireland) George Lyttleton-Rogers	6–3, 7–5, 4–6, 6–3
1939	(United Kingdom) Murray Deloford	(India) Ghaus Mohammed Khan	6–2, 5–7, 6–4, 6–2
1940–45	Not held		
1946	(Australia) Dinny Pails	(Republic of Ireland) Cyril A. Kemp	6–1, 6–2, 6–3
1947	(United Kingdom) Tony Mottram	(Republic of Ireland) Cyril A. Kemp	6–2, 6–4, 6–2
1948	(South Africa) Eric Sturgess	(India) Sumant Misra	6–1, 6–2, 3–6, 6–2
1949	(United Kingdom) Nigel Cockburn	(South Africa) Syd Levy	3–6, 3–6, 6–4, 6–1, 6–3
1950	(Republic of Ireland) Cyril A. Kemp	(South Africa) Bryan Rooke	6–1, 6–3, 6–3
1951	(South Africa) Abe Segal	(Republic of Ireland) Guy Jackson	6–3, 6–4, 6–0
1952	(India) Naresh Kumar	(United States) Steve Potts	6–1, 6–4, 6–8, 3–6, 6–2
1953	(India) Naresh Kumar (2)	(Republic of Ireland) Joe D. Hackett	6–1, 3–6, 6–2, 6–0
1954	(United States) Hugh Stewart	(Australia) Mervyn Rose	2–6, 6–4, 6–4, 11–13, 6–4
1955	(United States) Hugh Stewart (2)	(Australia) Bob Howe	6–4, 3–6, 6–1, 13–11
1956	(United States) Budge Patty	(United States) Hugh Stewart	3–6, 6–3, 6–4, 6–3
1957	(Australia) Ashley Cooper	(Czechoslovakia) Jaroslav Drobný	6–4, 6–2, 6–3
1958	(Australia) Neale Fraser / (United Kingdom) Mike Davies		Title shared
1959	(United States) Jack Frost	(United States) Jon Douglas	8–6, 11–9
1960	(United States) Dennis Ralston	(Australia) Martin Mulligan	6–3, 6–4, 7–5
1961	(United States) William E. Bond	(United States) Frank Froehling	6–4, 6–4, 5–7, 11–9
1962	(Australia) Rod Laver	(United Kingdom) Bobby Wilson	w/o
1963	(United Kingdom) Bobby Wilson	(United Kingdom) Billy Knight	6–3, 6–0, 6–3
1964	(United Kingdom) Bobby Wilson (2)	(United States) Roger Werksman	6–2, 6–2, 4–6, 6–2
1965	(Australia) Tony Roche	(United Kingdom) Mike Sangster	11–9, 13–11
1966	(United States) Jerry Cromwell	(United Kingdom) Graham Stilwell	7–9, 6–4, 6–4
1967	(United Kingdom) Keith Wooldridge	(Republic of Ireland) Peter Mockler	6–3, 3–6, 6–0
1968	(Netherlands) Tom Okker	(Australia) Lew Hoad	6–1, 6–2
↓ Open era ↓
1969	(South Africa) Bob Hewitt	(Socialist Federal Republic of Yugoslavia) Nikola Pilić	6–3, 6–2
1970	(Australia) Tony Roche (2)	(Australia) Rod Laver	6–3, 6–1
1971	(South Africa) Cliff Drysdale	(United States) Clark Graebner	10–8, 6–3
1972	(South Africa) Bob Hewitt (2)	(South Africa) Frew McMillan	6–1, 6–2
1973	(United Kingdom) Mark Cox	(South Africa) John Yuill	7–5, 3–6, 11–9
1974	(United States) Sherwood Stewart	(Rhodesia) Colin Dowdeswell	6–3, 9–8
1975	(Australia) Alvin Gardiner	(Rhodesia) Anthony Fawcett	9–7, 6–3
1976–77	Not held		
1978	(Australia) Robert Carmichael	(Republic of Ireland) Sean Sorensen	6–3, 6–2
1979	(Australia) Paul Kronk	(Republic of Ireland) Sean Sorensen	7–6, 6–4

=== Women's singles ===
Year	Champions	Runners-up	Score
1879	(Ireland) May Langrishe	(Ireland) D. Meldon	6–2, 0–6, 8–6
1880	(Ireland) D. Meldon (2)	(Ireland) Connie Butler	6–1, 6–1
1881	Not held		
1882	(England) Mary Abercrombie	(England) Marian Bradley	6–4, 6–1
1883	(Ireland) May Langrishe	(Ireland) Beatrice Langrishe	6–0, 6–1
1884	(United Kingdom of Great Britain and Ireland) Maud Watson	(Ireland) May Langrishe	6–3, 6–2, 6–2
1885	(United Kingdom of Great Britain and Ireland) Maud Watson (2)	(Ireland) Louisa Martin	6–2, 4–6, 6–3
1886	(Ireland) May Langrishe (2)	(Ireland) Louisa Martin	6–3, 6–4
1887	(England) Lottie Dod	(England) Maud Watson	6–4, 6–3
1888	(United Kingdom of Great Britain and Ireland) Blanche Bingley Hillyard	(United Kingdom of Great Britain and Ireland) Bertha Steedman	7–5, 6–2
1889	(United Kingdom of Great Britain and Ireland) Louisa Martin	(United Kingdom of Great Britain and Ireland) Blanche Bingley Hillyard	7–5, 6–0
1890	(Ireland) Louisa Martin (2)	(Ireland) Lena Rice	9–7, 6–4
1891	(Ireland) Louisa Martin (3)	(Ireland) Florence Stanuell	6–2, 5–7, 6–0
1892	(Ireland) Louisa Martin (4)	(United Kingdom of Great Britain and Ireland) Gertrude Crofton	6–1, 6–0
1893	(Ireland) Florence Stanuell	(United Kingdom of Great Britain and Ireland) Miss Pope	6–2, 6–3
1894	(United Kingdom of Great Britain and Ireland) Blanche Bingley Hillyard (2)	(United Kingdom of Great Britain and Ireland) Miss Shaw	6–3, 6–2
1895	(United Kingdom of Great Britain and Ireland) Charlotte Cooper	(Scotland) Lottie Paterson	6–4, 6–4
1896	(Ireland) Louisa Martin (5)	(United Kingdom of Great Britain and Ireland) Charlotte Cooper	6–0, 3–6, 6–2
1897	(United Kingdom of Great Britain and Ireland) Blanche Bingley Hillyard (3)	(Ireland) Ruth Dyas Durlacher	7–5, 2–6, 6–3
1898	(United Kingdom of Great Britain and Ireland) Charlotte Cooper	(Ireland) Louisa Martin	6–4, 9–7
1899	(Ireland) Louisa Martin (6)	(Ireland) Ruth Dyas Durlacher	6–1, 6–2
1900	(Ireland) Louisa Martin (7)	(United Kingdom of Great Britain and Ireland) Charlotte Cooper	2–6, 6–1, 6–2
1901	(United Kingdom of Great Britain and Ireland) Muriel Robb	(United Kingdom of Great Britain and Ireland) Ruth Dyas Durlacher	9–7, 6–1
1902	(Ireland) Louisa Martin (8)	(Ireland) Ruth Dyas Durlacher	6–8, 6–4, 7–5
1903	(Ireland) Louisa Martin (9)	(United Kingdom of Great Britain and Ireland) Maude Garfit	6–2, 4–6, 6–1
1904	(United Kingdom of Great Britain and Ireland) Winifred Longhurst	(United Kingdom of Great Britain and Ireland) Ellen Stawell-Brown	6–3, 6–3
1905	(United Kingdom of Great Britain and Ireland) Winifred Longhurst (2)	(United Kingdom of Great Britain and Ireland) Mrs. A.H.C. Barker	6–1, 6–0
1906	(United Kingdom of Great Britain and Ireland) Winifred Longhurst (3)	(United Kingdom of Great Britain and Ireland) Mabel Parton	6–1, 6–1
1907	(United Kingdom of Great Britain and Ireland) Maude Garfit	(United Kingdom of Great Britain and Ireland) Hilda Lane	6–2, 6–2
1908	(United Kingdom of Great Britain and Ireland) Maude Garfit (2)	(United Kingdom of Great Britain and Ireland) Edith Boucher	6–4, 6–2
1909	(United Kingdom of Great Britain and Ireland) Maude Garfit (3)	(United Kingdom of Great Britain and Ireland) Agnes Tuckey	9–7, 9–7
1910	(United Kingdom of Great Britain and Ireland) Bertha Holder	(United Kingdom of Great Britain and Ireland) Miss Hazlett	6–3, 2–6, 6–3
1911	(United Kingdom of Great Britain and Ireland) Mrs D.R. Barry	(United Kingdom of Great Britain and Ireland) Bertha Holder	6–3, 1–6, 6–4
1912	(United Kingdom of Great Britain and Ireland) Ethel Thomson Larcombe	(United Kingdom of Great Britain and Ireland) Mrs. Norton-Barry	6–4, 6–1
1913	(United Kingdom of Great Britain and Ireland) Mrs D.R. Norton-Barry (2)	(United Kingdom of Great Britain and Ireland) I. Clarke	6–2, 7–5
1914	(United Kingdom of Great Britain and Ireland) I. Clarke	(United Kingdom of Great Britain and Ireland) Winifred Longhurst	9–11, 6–2, 6–4
1915–18	Not held		
1919	(United States) Elizabeth Ryan	(United Kingdom of Great Britain and Ireland) Janet Jackson	6–0, 6–1
1920	(United States) Elizabeth Ryan (2)	(United Kingdom of Great Britain and Ireland) Geraldine Beamish	6–1, 6–2
1921	(United States) Elizabeth Ryan (3)	(United Kingdom of Great Britain and Ireland) Hilda Wallis	6–2, 6–4
1922	Not held		
1923	(United States) Elizabeth Ryan (4)	(United Kingdom of Great Britain and Ireland) Joanna Davidson	7–5, 4–6, 12–10
1924	(Republic of Ireland) Hilda Wallis	(Republic of Ireland) Miss Price	6–3, 6–4
1925	(Australia) Esna Boyd Robertson	(Australia) Daphne Akhurst Cozens	9–7, 6–1
1926	(Republic of Ireland) Hilda Wallis (2)	(Republic of Ireland) Miss Price	6–4, 6–0
1927	(United Kingdom) Phoebe Holcroft Watson	(United Kingdom) Elsie Goldsack	6–2, 6–2
1928	(Republic of Ireland) Mrs. Blair White	(Republic of Ireland) Hilda Wallis	6–1, 1–6, 8–6
1929	(South Africa) Bobby Heine	(South Africa) Billie Tapscott	3–6, 6–3, 6–2
1930	(Republic of Ireland) Hilda Wallis (3)	(Republic of Ireland) M. French	6–2, 6–2
1931	(Republic of Ireland) Mrs. Blair White (2)	(Republic of Ireland) Norma Stoker	6–4, 6–3
1932	(Poland) Jadwiga Jędrzejowska	(United Kingdom) Vera Montgomery	6–4, 6–2
1933	(Republic of Ireland) Hilda Wallis (4	(Republic of Ireland) Norma Stoker	6–4, 6–3
1934	(Denmark) Hilde Krahwinkel Sperling	(Australia) Joan Hartigan Bathurst	6–3, 6–1
1935	(United Kingdom) Sheila Chuter	(United Kingdom) Cristobel Wheatcroft	3–6, 6–3, 6–1
1936	(Chile) Anita Lizana	(United Kingdom) Nancy Dickin	6–3, 6–3
1937	(United Kingdom) Thelma Jarvis	(United Kingdom) Valerie Scott	6–4, 6–1
1938	(United States) Helen Wills Moody	(United Kingdom) Thelma Jarvis	6–4, 6–2
1939	(United States) Alice Marble	(United Kingdom) Susan Noel Powell	6–2, 6–4
1940–45	Not held		
1946	(United States) Louise Brough	(United States) Doris Hart	6–2, 7–5
1947	(United Kingdom) Jean Bostock	(Republic of Ireland) Betty Lombard	3–6, 6–4, 6–1
1948	(South Africa) Sheila Piercey Summers	(South Africa) Mary D. Muller	9–7, 6–1
1949	(Australia) Thelma Coyne Long	(United States) Shirley Fry	6–1, 4–6, 9–7
1950	(United States) Pat Todd	(United States) Barbara Scofield	6–3, 6–4
1951	(Republic of Ireland) Betty Lombard	(United States) Arvilla McGuire	6–2, 6–3
1952	(United States) Maureen Connolly	(United Kingdom) Jean Walker-Smith	6–1, 6–1
1953	(United Kingdom) Angela Mortimer	(United Kingdom) Shirley Bloomer Brasher	6–4, 0–6, 11–9
1954	(United States) Maureen Connolly	(France) Ginette Bucaille	6–2, 6–1
1955	(United States) Beverly Baker Fleitz	(United States) Darlene Hard	6–2, 6–2
1956	(United Kingdom) Shirley Bloomer Brasher	(United States) Dorothy Head Knode	8–6, 6–2
1957	(South Africa) Sandra Reynolds	(United Kingdom) Sheila Armstrong	4–6, 6–4, 6–0
1958	(United States) Dorothy Head Knode	(United Kingdom) Shirley Bloomer Brasher	4–6, 7–5, 7–5
1959	(South Africa) Renée Schuurman	(South Africa) Sandra Reynolds	6–1, 3–6, 6–3
1960	(United States) Dorothy Head Knode (2)	(New Zealand) Ruia Morrison	6–4, 6–2
1961	(United Kingdom) Ann Haydon	(United States) Kathy Chabot	6–0, 6–3
1962	(Australia) Madonna Schacht	(United States) Judy Alvarez	6–0, 6–3
1963	(United States) Billie Jean Moffitt	(United States) Carole Caldwell Graebner	6–4, 6–3
1964	(Brazil) Maria Bueno	(Czechoslovakia) Věra Pužejová Suková	6–0, 6–1
1965	(Brazil) Maria Bueno (2)	(United Kingdom) Christine Truman	10–8, 6–4
1966	(Australia) Margaret Court	(United States) Kathleen Harter	6–2, 6–1
1967	(United Kingdom) Alex Soady	(United Kingdom) Heather Allen	6–3, 6–2
1968	(Australia) Margaret Court (2)	(United Kingdom) Ann Haydon-Jones	6–3, 6–1
↓ Open era ↓
1969	(United States) Billie Jean King	(United Kingdom) Virginia Wade	6–2, 6–2
1970	(United Kingdom) Virginia Wade	(United States) Valerie Ziegenfuss	6–3, 6–3
1971	(Australia) Margaret Court (3)	(Australia) Evonne Goolagong	6–3, 2–6, 6–3
1972	(Australia) Evonne Goolagong	(South Africa) Pat Walkden	2–6, 6–1, 6–2
1973	(Australia) Margaret Court (4)	(United Kingdom) Virginia Wade	6–2, 6–4
1974	(France) Gail Sherriff	(Argentina) Raquel Giscafré	6–4, 6–1
1975	(United Kingdom) Sue Mappin	(United Kingdom) Lesley Charles	6–8, 6–4, 7–5
1976	(United Kingdom) Sue Mappin (2)	(South Africa) Tanya Harford	6–4, 6–0
1977	(Australia) Mary Sawyer	(Brazil) Maria Bueno	2–6, 6–3, 6–1
1978	(Australia) Mary Sawyer (2)	(Australia) Pam Whytcross	6–4, 6–4
1979	(Australia) Pam Whytcross	(United Kingdom) Cathy Drury	6–2, 6–4
1980	(Australia) Pam Whytcross (2)	(Australia) Nerida Gregory	6–1, 6–4
1981	(United Kingdom) Debbie Jevans	(Australia) Sue Saliba	0–6, 6–1, 6–4
1982	(United States) Diane Desfor	(United States) Lea Antonoplis	6–1, 3–6, 6–2
1983	(United States) Kate Latham	(Australia) Debbie Freeman	4–6, 6–2, 6–3

=== Men's doubles ===
Results included:

Year	Champions	Runners-up	Score
1879	(Ireland) J. Elliot (Ireland) H. Kellie	(Ireland) Peter Aungier (Ireland) Charles David Barry	?
1880	(England) William Renshaw (England) Ernest Renshaw	(Scotland) Herbert Lawford (Ireland) A. J. Mulholland	5–7, 6–3, 6–8, 6–2, 6–2.
1881	(England) William Renshaw (2) (England) Ernest Renshaw (2)	(Ireland) Arthur J. de Courcy Wilson (Ireland) Henry Hugh Wilson	def.
1882	(Ireland) Ernest Browne (Ireland) Peter Aungier	(England) William Renshaw (2) (England) Ernest Renshaw	6–4, 4–6, 6–3, 4–6, 8–6.
1883	(England) William Renshaw (3) (England) Ernest Renshaw (3)	(Ireland) Peter Aungier (Ireland) Ernest Browne	6–3, 6–0, 10–8.
1884	(England) William Renshaw (4) (England) Ernest Renshaw (4)	(England) Ernest Lewis (England) Edward Lake Williams	7–5, 6–4, 6–3.
1885	(England) William Renshaw (5) (England) Ernest Renshaw (5)	(Ireland) Ernest Browne (Ireland) Eyre Chatterton	6–4, 6–3, 4–6, 6–2.
1886	(Ireland) Willoughby Hamilton (Ireland) Herbert Knox McKay	(Ireland) Eyre Chatterton (United States) James Dwight	4–6, 6–2, 3–6, 6–4, 6–1.
1887	(Ireland) Willoughby Hamilton (2) (Ireland) Tom S. Campion	(Scotland) Patrick Bowes-Lyon (England) Herbert Wilberforce	6–3, 6–2, 4–6, 6–3.
1888	(Ireland) Willoughby Hamilton (3) (Ireland) Tom S. Campion (2)	(Ireland) Hugh Montgomery Cairnes (United Kingdom of Great Britain and Ireland) Cameron Dean-Shute	6–3, 9–7, 7–5.
1889	(United Kingdom of Great Britain and Ireland) Ernest Lewis (United Kingdom of Great Britain and Ireland) George Hillyard	(Ireland) Maxwell J. Carpendale (United Kingdom of Great Britain and Ireland) Harold S. Stone	6–2, 3–6, 6–2, 6–3.
1890	(Ireland) Joshua Pim (Ireland) Frank Stoker	(United Kingdom of Great Britain and Ireland) Ernest Lewis (United Kingdom of Great Britain and Ireland) George Hillyard	8–6, 6–2, 4–6, 6–4.
1891	(Ireland) Joshua Pim (2) (Ireland) Frank Stoker (2)	(United Kingdom of Great Britain and Ireland) Ernest Lewis (Ireland) Grainger Chaytor	7–5, 6–3, 4–6, 4–6, 6–3.
1892	(United Kingdom of Great Britain and Ireland) Ernest Lewis (2) (United Kingdom of Great Britain and Ireland) Ernest Meers	(Ireland) Joshua Pim (Ireland) Frank Stoker	6–1, 8–6, 6–4.
1893	(Ireland) Joshua Pim (Ireland) Frank Stoker (3)	(United Kingdom of Great Britain and Ireland) Ernest Lewis (United Kingdom of Great Britain and Ireland) Ernest Meers	default
1894	(Ireland) Joshua Pim (2) (Ireland) Frank Stoker (4)	(United Kingdom of Great Britain and Ireland) Ernest Lewis (Switzerland) Charles Henry Martin	6–3, 7–5, 6–4.
1895	(Ireland) Joshua Pim (3) (Ireland) Frank Stoker (5)	(United Kingdom of Great Britain and Ireland) Charles Allen (United Kingdom of Great Britain and Ireland) Roy Allen	6–4, 6–0, 6–2
1896	(United Kingdom of Great Britain and Ireland) Wilfred Baddeley (United Kingdom of Great Britain and Ireland) Herbert Baddeley	(United Kingdom of Great Britain and Ireland) Reginald Doherty (United Kingdom of Great Britain and Ireland) Harold Nesbitt	6–3, 7–5, 6–0
1897	(United Kingdom of Great Britain and Ireland) Wilfred Baddeley (2) (United Kingdom of Great Britain and Ireland) Herbert Baddeley (2)	(United Kingdom of Great Britain and Ireland) Reginald Doherty (United Kingdom of Great Britain and Ireland) Sydney Howard Smith	9–7, 7–5, 6–3
1898	(United Kingdom of Great Britain and Ireland) Reginald Doherty (United Kingdom of Great Britain and Ireland) Laurence Doherty	(United Kingdom of Great Britain and Ireland) Herbert Baddeley (United Kingdom of Great Britain and Ireland) Wilfred Baddeley	w.o.
1899	(United Kingdom of Great Britain and Ireland) Herbert Baddeley (United Kingdom of Great Britain and Ireland) Wilfred Baddeley	(United Kingdom of Great Britain and Ireland) Reginald Doherty (United Kingdom of Great Britain and Ireland) Sydney Howard Smith	w.o.
1900	(United Kingdom of Great Britain and Ireland) Reginald Doherty (2) (United Kingdom of Great Britain and Ireland) Laurence Doherty (2)	(Ireland) George Ball-Greene (United Kingdom) Arthur Gore	w.o.
1901	(United Kingdom of Great Britain and Ireland) Reginald Doherty (3) (United Kingdom of Great Britain and Ireland) Laurence Doherty (3)	(Ireland) George Ball-Greene (United Kingdom of Great Britain and Ireland) Sydney Howard Smith	6–2, 6–1, 6–4
1902	(United Kingdom of Great Britain and Ireland) Reginald Doherty 4) (United Kingdom of Great Britain and Ireland) Laurence Doherty (4)	(Ireland) Hugh Sweetman (Ireland) Roger Sweetman	6–2, 6–4, 6–2
1907	(Ireland) Herbert Newcombe Craig (Ireland) Thomas Douglas Good	(Ireland) James Cecil Parke (Ireland) John Frederick Stokes	8–6, 6–8, 9–7, 6–4.
1908	(United Kingdom) Alfred Beamish (United Kingdom) Charles F. Scroope	(Ireland) Herbert Newcombe Craig (Ireland) Thomas Douglas Good	3–6, 6–4, 7–5, 6–3.
1920	(Ireland) John F. O'Connell Miley (Ireland) Valentine W. O'Connell Miley	(Ireland) Edward D'Arcy McCrea (Ireland) John Frederick Stokes	6–0, 6–1, 6–4.
1921–2008	...		

=== Women's doubles ===
Year	Champions	Runners-up	Score
1884	(Ireland) Adela Langrishe (Ireland) May Langrishe	(England) Lilian Watson (England) Maud Watson	11–9, 6–2
1885	(England) Lilian Watson (England) Maud Watson		
1886	(Ireland) Connie Butler (Ireland) Louisa Martin		
1887	(Ireland) Louisa Martin (2) (Ireland) Florence Stanuell		
1888	(England) } Mary Steedman (England) Bertha Steedman		
1889	(Ireland) Louisa Martin (3) (Ireland) Florence Stanuell (2)		
1890	(Ireland) Louisa Martin (4) (Ireland) Florence Stanuell (3)		
1891	(Ireland) Louisa Martin (5) (Ireland) Florence Stanuell (4)		
1892	(England) Lottie Dod (England) Bertha Steedman (2)		
1893	(England) Jane Corder (Scotland) Winifred Shaw		Won
1894	(England) Blanche Bingley (England) Miss Snook		Won
1895	(United Kingdom of Great Britain and Ireland) Miss Cooper (United Kingdom of Great Britain and Ireland) Charlotte Cooper		
1896	(United Kingdom of Great Britain and Ireland) Alice Pickering (Ireland) Ruth Durlacher		
1897	(United Kingdom of Great Britain and Ireland) Blanche Bingley (United Kingdom of Great Britain and Ireland) Charlotte Cooper (2)		
1898	(Ireland) Louisa Martin (6) (Ireland) Ruth Durlacher		
1899	(Ireland) Ruth Durlacher (3) (Ireland) Louisa Martin (7)		
1900	(United Kingdom of Great Britain and Ireland) Charlotte Cooper (United Kingdom of Great Britain and Ireland) Ms. E. Cooper		
1901	(Ireland) Ruth Durlacher (2) (Ireland) Louisa Martin (8)		
1902	(Ireland) Ruth Durlacher (3) (Ireland) Miss Hazlett		
1925	(Australia) Esna Boyd (Australia) Floris E. S. St. George	(Australia) Sylvia Lance Harper (Australia) Daphne Akhurst	8–6, 6–4
1903–70	...		
↓ Open era ↓
1971	(Australia) Lesley Turner Bowrey (Netherlands) Betty Stöve	(Australia) Margaret Court (Australia) Evonne Goolagong	7–5, 6–1
1972	(South Africa) Brenda Kirk (South Africa) Pat Walkden-Pretorius	(Australia) Evonne Goolagong (Australia) Karen Krantzcke	6–3, 8–10, 6–2
1973	(Australia) Margaret Court (United Kingdom) Virginia Wade	(Australia) Helen Gourlay (Australia) Karen Krantzcke	8–6, 3–6, 6–4

=== Mixed doubles ===
Results included:

Year	Champions	Runners-up	Score
1879	(Ireland) J. Elliot (Ireland) Miss Costello	(Ireland) Adela Langrishe (Ireland) Charles David Barry	6–4, 6–4.
1880	(Ireland) Spencer Duncan Maul (Ireland) Miss Costello (2)	(Ireland) D. Meldon (Ireland) Robert Hassard	6–4, 7–5.
1881	(England) William Renshaw (England) Mary Abercrombie	(Ireland) Miss Costello (Ireland) Spencer D. Maul	6–3, 5–7, 6–2, 6–3.
1882	(Ireland) Ernest Browne (Ireland) Miss Perry	(England) Marion Bradley (England) William Renshaw	6–1, 6–0, 4–6, 1–6, 6–3.
1883	(Ireland) Ernest Browne (2) (Ireland) May Langrishe	(Ireland) Peter Aungier (Ireland) Lena Rice	6–3, 6–2, 6–0.
1884	(England) William Renshaw (England) Maud Watson	(Ireland) Connie Butler (Scotland) John Galbraith Horn	6–0, 8–6, 6–3.
1885	(England) William Renshaw (2) (England) Maud Watson (2)	(Ireland) Ernest Browne (Ireland) Miss Ramsay	6–4, 6–1, 6–4.
1886	(Ireland) Eyre Chatterton (Ireland) May Langrishe (2)	(Ireland) Toler Garvey (Ireland) Adela Langrishe	6–0, 6–2, 6–1.
1887	(England) Ernest Renshaw (England) Lottie Dod	(England) Harry Grove (England) Maud Watson	8–6, 5–7, 6–1, 6–3.
1888	(United Kingdom of Great Britain and Ireland) Ernest Wool Lewis (United Kingdom of Great Britain and Ireland) Margaret Bracewell	(United Kingdom of Great Britain and Ireland) Bertha Steedman (United Kingdom of Great Britain and Ireland) Hugh Cairns	6–3, 6–3, 4–6, 9–7.
1889	(Ireland) Willoughby Hamilton (Ireland) Lena Rice	(United Kingdom of Great Britain and Ireland) Blanche Hillyard (United Kingdom of Great Britain and Ireland) Harold S. Stone	6–4, 5–7, 6–4, 6–4.
1890	(Ireland) Grainger Chaytor (Ireland) Louisa Martin	(United Kingdom of Great Britain and Ireland) Helen Jackson (United Kingdom of Great Britain and Ireland) Arthur J. de C. Wilson	6–1, 6–3, 6–3
1891	(Ireland) Grainger Chaytor (2) (Ireland) Louisa Martin (2)		
1892	(Ireland) Grainger Chaytor (3) (Ireland) Louisa Martin (3)		
1893	(Ireland) Manliffe Goodbody (United Kingdom of Great Britain and Ireland) Miss E. C. Pinckney		
1894	(United Kingdom of Great Britain and Ireland) George Hillyard (United Kingdom of Great Britain and Ireland) Blanche Bingley		
1895	(Ireland) Harold Mahony (United Kingdom of Great Britain and Ireland) Charlotte Cooper		
1896	(Ireland) Harold Mahony (2) (United Kingdom of Great Britain and Ireland) Charlotte Cooper (2)		
1897	(United Kingdom of Great Britain and Ireland) George Greville (United Kingdom of Great Britain and Ireland) Blanche Bingley		
1898	(United Kingdom of Great Britain and Ireland) Harold Nisbet (Ireland) Ruth Durlacher		
1899	(United Kingdom of Great Britain and Ireland) Reginald Doherty (United Kingdom of Great Britain and Ireland) Charlotte Cooper (3)		
1900	(United Kingdom of Great Britain and Ireland) Reginald Doherty (2) (United Kingdom of Great Britain and Ireland) Charlotte Cooper (4)		
1901	(United Kingdom of Great Britain and Ireland) Laurence Doherty (Ireland) Ruth Durlacher		
1902	(United Kingdom of Great Britain and Ireland) Laurence Doherty (2) (Ireland) Ruth Durlacher (2)		
↓ Open era ↓

== See also ==
- Fitzwilliam Club Championships
- Fitzwilliam Plate
- Fitzwilliam Purse
- Irish Hard Court Championships
- Shelbourne Irish Open
- Tennis Ireland
