= Bertha Steedman =

British tennis player

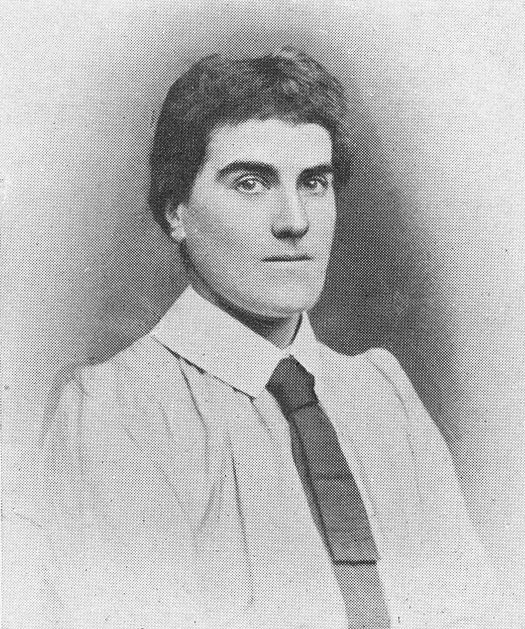
- Country (sports): United Kingdom
- Born: 20 July 1866; Ercall Magna, Shropshire, England
- Died: 11 January 1945 (aged 78); Seaford, East Sussex, England

Singles

Grand Slam singles results
- Wimbledon: SF (1889, 1891, 1892, 1899)

Bertha Steedman (20 July 1866 – 11 January 1945) was a British tennis player who was a four time semi finalist at the Wimbledon Championships. She also won nine All England Championships double titles, a precursor to the Wimbledon Championships, between 1889 and 1899 that were held as part of the Northern Championships.

Steedman won the All England Championships doubles tournament with her sister Mary Steedman in 1889 and 1890. From 1893 to 1897 she won the doubles title partnering Blanche Bingley, then in 1898 and 1899 with Ruth Durlacher.

Bertha and her sister Mary were among the first who focused on playing volley which was the basis of their success.

In singles, her last appearance at Wimbledon was in 1903.
