= Louisa Martin =

Irish tennis player (1865–1941)

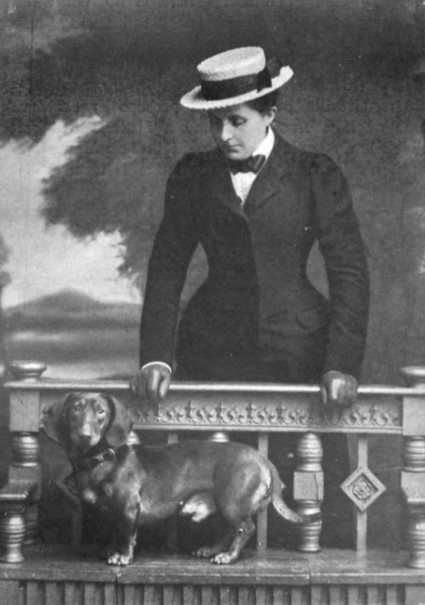
- Country (sports): Ireland
- Born: 3 September 1865 Newtowngore, Ireland
- Died: 24 October 1941 (aged 76) Portrush, Northern Ireland
- Turned pro: 1884 (amateur)
- Retired: 1908

Singles
- Career record: 104-16 (86.66%)
- Career titles: 24

Grand Slam singles results
- Wimbledon: F (1898^{AC})

Mary Louisa "Mollie" Martin (3 September 1865 – 24 October 1941) was a tennis player from Ireland. She was considered the leading Irish female player of her time. She was active from 1884 to 1908 and contested 35 career singles finals, and won 24 titles.

== Career ==
Martin started playing tennis in 1885 and early on was successful at the tournaments in Bath at the West of England Championships and at Buxton at the Derbyshire Championships. In 1898 she entered the Wimbledon Championships for the first (Note: According to author A. Wallis Myers in his book Fifty Years of Wimbledon (1926) Martin played in the singles event of the 1892 Wimbledon Championships and lost to Blanche Hillyard in the semifinal. The Wimbledon website registers this match under a separate player, A. Martin.) time and, after two wins and two byes, reached the All-comers' final, but was beaten in two sets by Charlotte Cooper. She did not play Wimbledon in 1899, and the following year, she again reached the All-comer's final to face Cooper and again lost. Her third and final entry at Wimbledon in 1901 also ended with a loss in the All-comers' final against Cooper.

Martin won nine singles titles at the Irish Championships between 1889 and 1903, then considered the second major tennis tournament of the 19th century and was a runner-up three times. She also won seven singles titles at the Northern Championships, also considered the third major tournament of the period which was held alternately in Liverpool and Manchester.

With Sydney H. Smith, she won two mixed doubles titles at Wimbledon.

She was a member of the Fitzwilliam Lawn Tennis Club in Dublin, Ireland, and was coached by the clubs resident professional George J. Kerr.

== Grand Slam finals ==
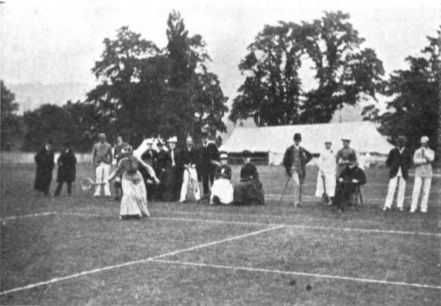
Martin at the Bath tournament in 1885

=== Singles (1 runner-up) ===
Result	Year	Championship	Surface	Opponent	Score
Loss	1898 (Note: Only the 1898 edition of the All-comer's final is listed because the winner of this final was awarded the singles title in the absence of a challenge round. From 1886 until 1921, the tournament started with a knockout phase, the All Comers' Singles, whose winner then faced the defending champion in a challenge round final. The All Comers' final winner automatically was awarded the title 11 times, (including 1898 but not 1900 and 1901) because the previous year's champion did not defend her title.)	Wimbledon	Surface	(United Kingdom of Great Britain and Ireland) Charlotte Cooper	4–6, 4–6
