= 1890 women's tennis season =

Women's tennis tournament series

1890 Women's Tennis Season
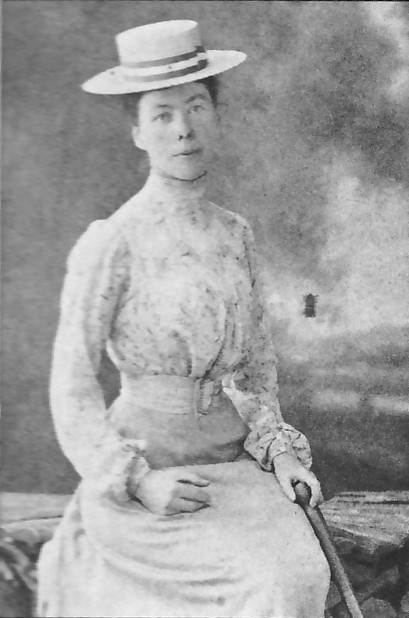
- Ireland's Lena Rice wins the seasons biggest event Wimbledon and one other title

Details
- Duration: 15 January – 24 December
- Edition: 15th
- Tournaments: 81
- Categories: Important (4); National (5); Provincial/Regional/State (15); County (10); Regular (34)

Achievements (singles)
- Most titles: (England) May Jacks (5)
- Most finals: (England) May Jacks (7)

The 1890 Women's Tennis Season was a tennis tournament circuit composed of 81 major, national, regional, county, and regular tournaments. The season began in January 1890 in Chepauk, India, and ended in January 1891 in Dunedin, New Zealand.

== Summary of season ==
From 1888 until 1912 Britain's Lawn Tennis Association (LTA), grew in status and influence to become the de facto international tennis governing body before the proper International Lawn Tennis Federation commenced operations. Despite the United States National Lawn Tennis Association (USNLTA) forming in 1881 a good seven years before the LTA, it was the British body that set laws, settled disputes and organized the increasingly complicated tournament calendar before the International Lawn Tennis Federation (ILTF) formed in March, 1913.

After the formation of the ILTF the world tennis circuit going forward was a highly organised and structured network of national and international tournaments. Most tennis tournaments were usually mixed events for men and women, and the women's international tennis circuit certainly up to 1923 was composed mainly of tournaments on the British and European Circuits. After the USNLTA joined the ILTF this would later change with more and more tournaments being staged globally. Women tennis players on the world circuit up to the open era were funded by their national associations enabling them to travel and take part in international tournaments.

1890 sees an increase in the number women's singles events being held as the tennis circuit continues to form. The 1890 women's tennis season began on 8 January with the first Southern India Championships staged at Madras, India. In May 1890 at the first major event of the year the Irish Championships played at the Fitzwilliam Lawn Tennis Club in Dublin, Ireland. Ireland's Louisa Martin wins the singles title beating fellow countrywoman Lena Rice, she also picks up the ladies doubles event partnered with Florence Stanuell, and completes a clean sweep by winning the mixed doubles with Grainger Chaytor.

In mid June 1890 the change in scheduling is continued when the U.S. National Championships are held at the Philadelphia Cricket Club, PA, defending champion Bertha Townsend loses her title to Ellen Roosevelt in straight sets.

Later the same month the third major tournament of the year the Northern Championships played at the Liverpool Cricket Club in Liverpool Mary Steedman is the new Northern Champion beating Beatrice Wood in two sets, in the women's doubles event final Florence Mardall and Mary Steedman defeat Miss Quin and Miss Scrivener in straight sets, and the All England Mixed Doubles Championship event, is won by Katherine Hill and James Baldwin who defeat Mary Steedman and George Hillyard in the final.

In July at the fourth and final major event of the season the 1890 Wimbledon Championships the world's first major tennis tournament, Irish player Lena Rice reaches the final for the second year, but this time takes the title, when she defeats May Jacks in the final. The season ended on 3 January 1891 at the New Zealand Championships, held in Dunedin, New Zealand which began on 30 December 1890 and was played on grass.

In terms of draw sizes the Northumberland Championships with 18 entrants was the largest open ladies singles draw for 1890, the Irish Championships with 27 entrants across three disciplines singles, doubles and mixed was the largest major event of the year and was the joint largest open event of the year along with the Sussex Championships and South of England Championships also with 27 entrants. The largest event outside of Europe was the New South Wales Championships.

== Season results ==
Prior to the creation of the International Lawn Tennis Federation and the establishment of its world championship events in 1913 the Wimbledon Championships, the U.S. National Championships, the Irish Lawn Tennis Championships and the Northern Championships were considered by players and historians as the four most important tennis tournaments to win, together effectively making an early incarnation of the Grand Slam events we know today.

Key

Important.
National
Provincial/State/Regional
County
Regular

=== January ===
Ended	Tournament	Winner	Finalist	Semifinalist	Quarterfinalist
18 Jan	South India Championships; Madras Gymkhana Club; Madras, India; Clay; Singles - Doubles	(India) Edith Morgan; 6–2, 4–6, 6–4	(India) Margaret Benson	(India) Margaret Benson (India) Hilda Wilkieson	
18 Jan	South India Championships; Madras Gymkhana Club; Madras, India; Clay; Singles - Doubles	(India) Edith Morgan (India) Margaret Benson; 6–4, 6–4	(India) Hilda Wilkieson (India) Mrs J.K. Smethurst	(India) Margaret Benson (India) Hilda Wilkieson	
18 Jan	South India Championships; Madras Gymkhana Club; Madras, India; Clay; Singles - Doubles	(India) Edith Morgan (England) Harry Grove; 6–3, 4–6, 7–5	(India) Margaret Benson (England) Charles Lacy Sweet	(India) Margaret Benson (India) Hilda Wilkieson	

=== February ===
Ended	Tournament	Winner	Finalist	Semi finalist	Quarter finalist
22 Feb.	Otago LTA Tournament; Carisbrook Club Ground; Dunedin, New Zealand; Grass; Singles - Doubles	(New Zealand) Ruth Orbell; 9–7	(New Zealand) L. Mackerras	(New Zealand) Miss Grant (New Zealand) Miss G. Rattray	(New Zealand) Miss Morris
22 Feb.	Pau International Tournament (later Pau Championships); Trinquet Club de Beaumont; Pau France; Clay; Singles - Doubles	(Wales) Edith Austin def.	(Ireland) May Geary	(Scotland) Miss MacFarlane (England) Mrs Bruce-Johnston	

=== March ===
Ended	Tournament	Winner	Finalist	Semifinalist	Quarterfinalist
15 Mar	Queen's Club Covered Court Championship; Queen's Club; London, England; Wood (i); Singles - Doubles	(England) May Jacks; 6–0, 6–2	(United Kingdom) Mary Pick	(United Kingdom) Alice Arbuthnot (United Kingdom) May Arbuthnot	(United Kingdom) Ivy Arbuthnot
27 Mar.	Auckland Association Championships; Auckland, New Zealand; Grass; Singles - Doubles	(New Zealand) Miss Spiers def	(New Zealand) Miss Cay		
29 Mar.	Cannes Réunion Club Tournament; Réunion Club; Cannes, France; Clay; Singles - Doubles	(England) Miss Leigh def.	(England) Miss Miles	(Ireland) Miss Maguire	
29 Mar.	Cannes Réunion Club Tournament; Réunion Club; Cannes, France; Clay; Singles - Doubles	(Duchy of Nassau) Countess Sophie of Merenberg (Wales) Cpt. Arthur H. Pryce-Harrison; 6–3, 3–6, 6–2	(England) Miss Halford (Ireland) Michael Gallwey McNamara	(Ireland) Miss Maguire	

=== April ===
Ended	Tournament	Winner	Finalist	Semifinalist	Quarterfinalist
5 Apr.	Natal Championships; Durban, Colony of Natal; Grass; Singles - Doubles	(Colony of Natal) Norah Hickman; 6–3, 3–6, 6–3	(Colony of Natal) Mabel Grant		
12 Apr	South Australian Championships; Adelaide Oval Courts; Adelaide, Australia; Asphalt; Singles - Doubles	(Australia) Maisie Parr; Won	(Australia) ?		
13 Apr	Ceylon Championships; The Hill Club; Nuwara Eliya, Ceylon; Clay Singles - Doubles	(Dominion of Ceylon) Miss Wynniatt; 6–1, 6–1	(Dominion of Ceylon) Miss Watson		
19 Apr	British Covered Court Championships; Hyde Park LTC; London, England; Wood (i); Singles - Doubles	(England) May Jacks; 6–0, 6–1	(United Kingdom) Maud Shackle		
19 Apr	Moss Vale Tournament; Mossvale TC; Moss Vale, Australia; Grass; Singles - Doubles	(Australia) K. Nicholson; 6–4, 6–4	(Australia) Mrs. Green		
26 Apr.	Singapore LLTC Spring Open; Singapore, Straits Settlement; Grass; Singles - Doubles	(Straits Settlements) Mrs. Edwardes; 6–1, 6–5	(Straits Settlements) Mrs. Salzmann		

=== May ===
Ended	Tournament	Winner	Finalist	Semifinalist	Quarterfinalist
14 May	New South Wales Championships; Moore Park; Sydney, Australia; Grass; Singles - Doubles	(Australia) Ellen Mayne; 8–6, 6–1	(Australia) Ellen Blaxland	(Australia) Eliza Fitzgerald (Australia) Edith Fox	(Australia) Miss Dransfield (Australia) Mrs Lindon (Australia) Mabel Shaw
14 May	New South Wales Championships; Moore Park; Sydney, Australia; Grass; Singles - Doubles	Challenger (Australia) Zilla Scott		(Australia) Eliza Fitzgerald (Australia) Edith Fox	(Australia) Miss Dransfield (Australia) Mrs Lindon (Australia) Mabel Shaw
14 May	New South Wales Championships; Moore Park; Sydney, Australia; Grass; Singles - Doubles	(Australia) Ellen Mayne (Australia) Mabel Shaw; 6–4, 7–5	(Australia) Zilla Scott (Australia) Dransfield	(Australia) Eliza Fitzgerald (Australia) Edith Fox	(Australia) Miss Dransfield (Australia) Mrs Lindon (Australia) Mabel Shaw
14 May	New South Wales Championships; Moore Park; Sydney, Australia; Grass; Singles - Doubles	(Australia) Ellen Mayne (Australia) Dudley Webb; 6–4, 6–2	(Australia) Robert Fitzgerald (Australia) Eliza Fitzgerald	(Australia) Eliza Fitzgerald (Australia) Edith Fox	(Australia) Miss Dransfield (Australia) Mrs Lindon (Australia) Mabel Shaw
27 May	Norton Lawn Tennis Open Tournament; Norton Cricket Club Grounds; Hexham, England; Grass; Singles - Doubles	(England) Jane Corder; 8–6, 6–0	(England) Helen Jackson		
30 May	Irish Championships; Fitzwilliam LTC; Dublin, Ireland; Grass; Singles - Doubles	(Ireland) Louisa Martin; 9–7, 6–4	(Ireland) Lena Rice	(Ireland) G. Crofton (England) Helen Jackson	(Ireland) A. Becher (Ireland) B. Becher (Ireland) Connie Butler (Ireland) Florence Stanuell
30 May	Irish Championships; Fitzwilliam LTC; Dublin, Ireland; Grass; Singles - Doubles	(Ireland) Louisa Martin (Ireland) Florence Stanuell; 6–4, 6–2	(England) Blanche Hillyard (Ireland) D. Meldon	(Ireland) G. Crofton (England) Helen Jackson	(Ireland) A. Becher (Ireland) B. Becher (Ireland) Connie Butler (Ireland) Florence Stanuell
30 May	Irish Championships; Fitzwilliam LTC; Dublin, Ireland; Grass; Singles - Doubles	(Ireland) Louisa Martin (Ireland) Grainger Chaytor; 6–1, 6–3, 6–3	(England) Helen Jackson (Ireland) Arthur J. de Courcy Wilson	(Ireland) G. Crofton (England) Helen Jackson	(Ireland) A. Becher (Ireland) B. Becher (Ireland) Connie Butler (Ireland) Florence Stanuell

=== June ===
Ended	Tournament	Winner	Finalist	Semifinalist	Quarterfinalist
1 Jun	Ealing Championships; Ealing LTC; Ealing, England; Grass; Singles - Doubles	(England) Alice Brown; 8–6, 6–0	(England) Charlotte Copper		
2 Jun	New York Tennis Club Open; New York TC; New York, United States; Clay; Singles - Doubles	No Ladies Singles			
2 Jun	New York Tennis Club Open; New York TC; New York, United States; Clay; Singles - Doubles	(United States) Miss Burdette (United States) Miss Mowry; 1–6, 6–2, 6–4	(United States) Mrs Badgley (Ireland) Mabel Cahill		
2 Jun	New York Tennis Club Open; New York TC; New York, United States; Clay; Singles - Doubles	(United States) Miss Burdette (United States) Carroll J. Post jr. 5–7, 6–3, 6–3	(Ireland) Mabel Cahill (United States) Russell R. Perkins		
7 Jun	London Championships; Queen's Club; London, England; Grass; Singles - Doubles	(England) May Jacks; 6–2, 6–1	(United Kingdom) Elsie Pinckney	(Wales) Edith Austin (England) Cordelia Phillimore	(England) Mrs H. Anderson (Ireland) Beatrice Langrishe
7 Jun	London Championships; Queen's Club; London, England; Grass; Singles - Doubles	Challenger (United Kingdom) Maud Shackle		(Wales) Edith Austin (England) Cordelia Phillimore	(England) Mrs H. Anderson (Ireland) Beatrice Langrishe
7 Jun	Championship of the West of England; Bath, England; Grass; Singles - Doubles	(Ireland) Louisa Martin; 6–3, 8–6	(United Kingdom) N Pope	(England) Constance Bryan (England) Miss Stoddart	(Ireland) Connie Butler (England) Miss Langley (England) Alice Parr (Ireland) Florence Stanuell
7 Jun	Championship of the West of England; Bath, England; Grass; Singles - Doubles	(Ireland) Louisa Martin (Ireland) Florence Stanuell; 6–3, 6–3	(England) Constance Bryan (United Kingdom) N Pope	(England) Constance Bryan (England) Miss Stoddart	(Ireland) Connie Butler (England) Miss Langley (England) Alice Parr (Ireland) Florence Stanuell
7 Jun	Championship of the West of England; Bath, England; Grass; Singles - Doubles	(Ireland) Louisa Martin (United Kingdom) James Baldwin; 6–3, 6–1	(England) Constance Bryan (England) Henry Guy Nadin	(England) Constance Bryan (England) Miss Stoddart	(Ireland) Connie Butler (England) Miss Langley (England) Alice Parr (Ireland) Florence Stanuell
14 Jun	U.S. National Championships; Philadelphia, United States; Grass; Singles - Doubles	(United States) Ellen Roosevelt; 6–2, 6–2	(United States) Bertha Townsend	(United States) Margarette Ballard (Ireland) Mabel Cahill	(United States) D.F. Butterfield (United States) F.K. Gregory (United States) Rebecca H. Lycett (United States) S. Day
14 Jun	U.S. National Championships; Philadelphia, United States; Grass; Singles - Doubles	(United States) Ellen Roosevelt (United States) Grace Roosevelt; 6–1, 6–2	(United States) Margarette Ballard (United States) Bertha Townsend	(United States) Margarette Ballard (Ireland) Mabel Cahill	(United States) D.F. Butterfield (United States) F.K. Gregory (United States) Rebecca H. Lycett (United States) S. Day
14 Jun	Surrey County Championships; Berrylands LTC; Surbiton, England; Grass; Singles - Doubles	(United Kingdom) May Arbuthnot; 6–2, 6–2	(United Kingdom) Elizabeth Mocatta	(United Kingdom) Emily Looker (United Kingdom) G. Leeds-Paine	(United Kingdom) Alice Arbuthnot (United Kingdom) Ivy Arbuthnot (United Kingdom) Miss Calder (United Kingdom) Elsie Lane
14 Jun	Surrey County Championships; Berrylands LTC; Surbiton, England; Grass; Singles - Doubles	(England) May Jacks (England) John Redfern Deykin; 6–4, 6–2	(United Kingdom) Elsie Pinckney (United Kingdom) Arthur Gore	(United Kingdom) Emily Looker (United Kingdom) G. Leeds-Paine	(United Kingdom) Alice Arbuthnot (United Kingdom) Ivy Arbuthnot (United Kingdom) Miss Calder (United Kingdom) Elsie Lane
14 Jun	Whitehouse Open; Whitehouse LTC; Edinburgh, Scotland; Clay; Singles - Doubles	(Scotland) Lottie Paterson; 6–0, 8–6	(England) Jane Corder		
14 Jun	Whitehouse Open; Whitehouse LTC; Edinburgh, Scotland; Clay; Singles - Doubles	(Scotland) Miss Meikle (Scotland) Lottie Paterson; 3–6, 7–5, 7–5	(Scotland) E. Ferguson (Scotland) Jane Meikle		
14 Jun	Whitehouse Open; Whitehouse LTC; Edinburgh, Scotland; Clay; Singles - Doubles	(Scotland) Lottie Paterson (Cape Colony) Edward Barnard Fuller; 6–1, 6–2	(Scotland) Miss Meikle (England) Stanley Riseley		
14 Jun	East Gloucestershire Championships; Cheltenham LTC; Cheltenham, England; Grass; Singles - Doubles	(England) Constance Bryan; 6–1, 6–0	(England) Beatrice Wood	(England) Mary Agg (England) Miss Crossley	
15 Jun	Championship of Nebraska; Kearney, United States; Grass; Singles - Doubles	(United States) Miss Doolittle; 6–0, 7–5, 6–3	(United States) Mrs G.W. Frank		
17 Jun	Scottish Championships; Dyvours Lawn Tennis Club; Edinburgh, Scotland; Grass; Singles - Doubles	(England) Helen Jackson; 6–1, 6–0	(Scotland) Lottie Paterson	(England) Miss Crosby (England) Mabel Shaw	(England) Jane Corder
21 Jun	Kent All-Comers' Championships; Beckenham LTC; Beckenham, England; Grass; Singles - Doubles	(England) May Jacks; 4–6, 6–0, 6–4	(United Kingdom) G. Leeds-Paine	(United Kingdom) Miss Howes (United Kingdom) Gertrude Mellersh	(United Kingdom) Miss Blaker (United Kingdom) Miss Cooper
21 Jun	Kent All-Comers' Championships; Beckenham LTC; Beckenham, England; Grass; Singles - Doubles	Holder (United Kingdom) Maud Shackle		(United Kingdom) Miss Howes (United Kingdom) Gertrude Mellersh	(United Kingdom) Miss Blaker (United Kingdom) Miss Cooper
21 Jun	Kent All-Comers' Championships; Beckenham LTC; Beckenham, England; Grass; Singles - Doubles	(United Kingdom) D.E. Payn (United Kingdom) G. Leeds-Paine; 4–6, 6–3, 6–3	(United Kingdom) Arthur Gore (England) May Jacks	(United Kingdom) Miss Howes (United Kingdom) Gertrude Mellersh	(United Kingdom) Miss Blaker (United Kingdom) Miss Cooper
21 Jun	Northern Championships; Liverpool Cricket Club; Liverpool, England; Grass; Singles - Doubles	(United Kingdom) Mary Steedman walkover	(England) Beatrice Wood	(United Kingdom) Miss Mills (United Kingdom) Miss Vicars	(United Kingdom) Katherine Hill
21 Jun	Northern Championships; Liverpool Cricket Club; Liverpool, England; Grass; Singles - Doubles	Holder (England) Lottie Dod		(United Kingdom) Miss Mills (United Kingdom) Miss Vicars	(United Kingdom) Katherine Hill
21 Jun	Northern Championships; Liverpool Cricket Club; Liverpool, England; Grass; Singles - Doubles	(England) Florence Mardall (United Kingdom) Bertha Steedman; 6–1, 6–1	(United Kingdom) Miss Quin (United Kingdom) Miss Scrivener	(United Kingdom) Miss Mills (United Kingdom) Miss Vicars	(United Kingdom) Katherine Hill
21 Jun	Northern Championships; Liverpool Cricket Club; Liverpool, England; Grass; Singles - Doubles	(United Kingdom) Katherine Hill (United Kingdom) James Baldwin; 10–8, 6–2	(United Kingdom) Mary Steedman (United Kingdom) George Hillyard	(United Kingdom) Miss Mills (United Kingdom) Miss Vicars	(United Kingdom) Katherine Hill
23 Jun	New Jersey Championships; Orange LTC; South Orange, United States; Grass; Singles - Doubles	(Ireland) Mabel Cahill walkover	(United States) Gertrude Williams	(United States) May Colby (United States) Miss Hitch	
23 Jun	New Jersey Championships; Orange LTC; South Orange, United States; Grass; Singles - Doubles	(Ireland) Mabel Cahill (United States) Russell R. Perkins; 6–2, 6–0	(United States) May Colby (United States) S.M. Colgate	(United States) May Colby (United States) Miss Hitch	
24 Jun	North of Ireland Championships; Cliftonville Cricket Ground; Belfast, Ireland; Singles - Doubles	(Ireland) A. Kinahan; 6–2, 6–0	(England) Miss Newett		
26 Jun	Orange Spring Tournament; Orange LTC; South Orange, United States; Grass; Singles - Doubles	(Ireland) Mabel Cahill; 6–3, 6–1	(United States) Emma Leavitt-Morgan		
26 Jun	Orange Spring Tournament; Orange LTC; South Orange, United States; Grass; Singles - Doubles	(Ireland) Mabel Cahill (United States) Russell R. Perkins def	(United States) May Colby (United States) S.M. Colgate		
27 June	Midland Counties Championships; Edgbaston CLTC; Edgbaston, England; Grass; Singles - Doubles	(England) L. Johnstone; 6–2, 5–6, 6–4	(United Kingdom) Ethel Valentin		
28 Jun	Kings County Spring Tournament; Kings County LTC; Brooklyn, United States; Grass; Singles - Doubles	(United States) Helen Hellwig; 6–1, 6–3, 6–4	(United States) Juliette Atkinson		
28 Jun	Kings County Spring Tournament; Kings County LTC; Brooklyn, United States; Grass; Singles - Doubles	(United States) Helen Hellwig (United States) A.M. Blaisdell; 6–2	(United States) Miss L.J. Cuddy (United States) E.A. Snyder		
29 Jun	Lansdowne Lawn Tennis Tournament; Lansdowne LTC; Dublin, Ireland; Grass; Singles - Doubles	(Ireland) Lena Rice; 6–3, 6–1	(Ireland) Miss Wilson	(Ireland) Miss Jackson	

=== July ===
Ended	Tournament	Winner	Finalist	Semifinalist	Quarterfinalist
4 Jul	Wimbledon Championships; AELTC; London, England; Grass; Singles	(Ireland) Lena Rice; 6–4, 6–1	(England) May Jacks	(England) Edith Cole (United Kingdom) Mary Steedman	
12 Jul	Championship of Middlesex; Chiswick Park, England; Grass; Singles - Doubles	(United Kingdom) Mary Steedman; 6–2, 6–2	(United Kingdom) Maud Shackle	(England) Charlotte Cooper (England) Elsie Lane	(United Kingdom) Mrs Anderson (United Kingdom) F. Bailey (United Kingdom) Miss Brown (United Kingdom) Elizabeth Mocatta
12 Jul	Championship of Middlesex; Chiswick Park, England; Grass; Singles - Doubles	Challenger (England) May Jacks		(England) Charlotte Cooper (England) Elsie Lane	(United Kingdom) Mrs Anderson (United Kingdom) F. Bailey (United Kingdom) Miss Brown (United Kingdom) Elizabeth Mocatta
12 Jul	Nottinghamshire LTA Tournament; Nottingham, England; Grass; Singles - Doubles	(United Kingdom) Miss Rome; 6–2, 6–2	(United Kingdom) M. Evans		
12 Jul	Llandudno Open; Craigside Hydro; Llandudno, Wales; Grass; Singles - Doubles	(England) Ida Cressy; 7–5, 6–1	(United Kingdom) K. Grant		
12 Jul	Yorkshire Association and County Open Tournament; Ilkley LTC; Ilkley, England; Grass; Singles - Doubles	(England) Beatrice Wood; 6–2, 6–1	(England) Jane Corder	(United Kingdom) Mrs E.J. Crossley (England) E. Wagstaffe	(Ireland) L. Chatterton-Clarke (Scotland) S. Leighton
12 Jul	Yorkshire Association and County Open Tournament; Ilkley LTC; Ilkley, England; Grass; Singles - Doubles	(Ireland) L. Chatterton-Clarke (England) Beatrice Wood; 6–3, 6–2	(United Kingdom) Mrs E.J. Crossley (United Kingdom) Miss Crossley	(United Kingdom) Mrs E.J. Crossley (England) E. Wagstaffe	(Ireland) L. Chatterton-Clarke (Scotland) S. Leighton
12 Jul	Yorkshire Association and County Open Tournament; Ilkley LTC; Ilkley, England; Grass; Singles - Doubles	(Ireland) L. Chatterton-Clarke (United Kingdom) Charles Wade; 6–4, 7–5	(England) Beatrice Wood (United Kingdom) James Baldwin	(United Kingdom) Mrs E.J. Crossley (England) E. Wagstaffe	(Ireland) L. Chatterton-Clarke (Scotland) S. Leighton
14 Jul	National Championship of the Netherlands (unofficial) de Bataaf; Scheveningen, Netherlands; Cement; Singles - Doubles	(Netherlands) Miss. M. Bol; 6–5, 6–5	(Netherlands) Miss E. van Aken		
14 Jul	National Championship of the Netherlands (unofficial) de Bataaf; Scheveningen, Netherlands; Cement; Singles - Doubles	(Netherlands) Miss M. Bol (Netherlands) A.P. Van Aken; 6–5, 6–2, 4–6, 6–3	(Netherlands) Miss van der Hoop (Netherlands) Jan Aegidius Van der Rhede		
16 Jul	Leamington Open Tournament; Leamington Spa, England; Grass; Singles - Doubles	(United Kingdom) Alice Pickering; 7–5, 6–1	(United Kingdom) Katherine Hill		
19 July	Queen's Club Open; Queen's Club; London, England; Grass; Singles - Doubles	(England) May Jacks default	(United Kingdom) Maud Shackle	(Wales) Edith Austin (England) Cordelia Phillimore	(United Kingdom) Mrs H. Anderson (Scotland) E. Malcom
20 Jul	Hudson River Championships; Far & Near LTC; Hastings-on-Hudson, United States; Grass; Singles - Doubles	(Ireland) Mabel Cahill; 6–3, 6–3	(United States) Emma Leavitt-Morgan		
23 Jul	Gore Court Championships; Gore Court ALTC; Sittingbourne, England; Grass; Singles - Doubles	(United Kingdom) E. Malden; 6–2, 7–5	(United Kingdom) J. Wakeley		
26 Jul	Hull Westbourne Avenue Open Tournament; Westbourne Ave Grounds; Hull, England; Grass; Singles - Doubles	(United Kingdom) Katherine Grey; 6–1, 5–7, 9–7	(United Kingdom) E. Lee-Smith		
29 Jul	Long Island Championships; Southampton, United States; Grass; Singles - Doubles	No Ladies Singles			
29 Jul	Long Island Championships; Southampton, United States; Grass; Singles - Doubles	(United States) Miss Betts (United States) Grace Roosevelt; 6–5, 6–2, 4–6, 6–3	(United States) H. Dinsmore (United States) Ellen Roosevelt		

=== August ===
Ended	Tournament	Winner	Finalist	Semifinalist	Quarterfinalist
2 Aug	Eastern Counties Championships; Felixstowe LTC; Felixstowe, England; Grass; Singles - Doubles	(United Kingdom) Florence Noon Thompson; 6–3, 6–4	(United Kingdom) Winifred Kersey		
2 Aug	Northumberland Championships; Newcastle, England; Grass; Singles - Doubles	(England) Helen Jackson; 6–4, 6–3	(England) Jane Corder	(Ireland) Connie Butler (United Kingdom) Alice Pickering	
2 Aug	Northumberland Championships; Newcastle, England; Grass; Singles - Doubles	(England) Helen Jackson (Ireland) Manliffe Goodbody; 6–0, 6–3	(United Kingdom) Miss Clark (United Kingdom) C.W. Wodt	(Ireland) Connie Butler (United Kingdom) Alice Pickering	
4 Aug	Sheffield and Hallamshire Tournament; Sheffield, England; Grass; Singles - Doubles	(England) Beatrice Wood; 6–4, 6–2	(United Kingdom) M. Crossley		
7 Aug	Maritime Provinces Championships; Truro Tennis Club; Truro, Canada; Singles - Doubles	(Canada) Miss Wiltshire; Won			
7 Aug	Maritime Provinces Championships; Truro Tennis Club; Truro, Canada; Singles - Doubles	(Canada) Miss Ball (Canada) Miss Newberry			
7 Aug	Darlington Association Tournament; Feethams Cricket Ground; Darlington, England; Grass; Singles - Doubles	(England) Lottie Dod; 6–3, 3–6, 6–2	(England) Constance Smith		
7 Aug	Darlington Association Tournament; Feethams Cricket Ground; Darlington, England; Grass; Singles - Doubles	(England) Lottie Dod (United Kingdom) Kenneth Marley; 6–0, 6–2	(United Kingdom) E. Sykes (United Kingdom) T Coventry		
8 Aug	Championship of the Coast; Hotel Redondo; Redondo Beach, United States; Asphalt; Singles - Doubles	(United States) Miss F. Shoemaker; 1–6, 6–4, 7–5	(United States) Miss English	(United Kingdom) May Carter (United States) Miss Tufts	
9 Aug	Exmouth Tournament; Exmouth LTC; Exmouth, England; Grass; Singles - Doubles	(Ireland) Lilian Pine-Coffin; 6–1, 5–7, 6–4	(United Kingdom) Katherine Hole	(United Kingdom) Jessie Meyler (United Kingdom) Florence Renwick	(England) Miss Kindersley (United Kingdom) Lois Renwick; Mary Renwick
9 Aug	West of Scotland Championships; Castle Wemyss; Wemyss Bay, Scotland; Grass; Singles - Doubles	(Scotland) Miss Moir; 6–1, 6–3	(England) Helen Jackson		
9 Aug	West of Scotland Championships; Castle Wemyss; Wemyss Bay, Scotland; Grass; Singles - Doubles	(United Kingdom) E. Marley (Scotland) Richard Millar Watson; 14–12, 6–4	(England) Helen Jackson (Scotland) G. Scott-Jackson		
16 Aug	Felixstowe Open; Felixstowe LTC; Felixstowe, England; Grass; Singles - Doubles	(United Kingdom) Florence Thompson; 6–3, 6–4	(United Kingdom) Winifred Kersey	(United Kingdom) L.E. Fanshawe (United Kingdom) Mrs L. Turner	(Wales) Edith Austin (United Kingdom) F.A. King-Church (United Kingdom) Miss F.G. Green (United Kingdom) Miss E.M. Sexton
16 Aug	Felixstowe Open; Felixstowe LTC; Felixstowe, England; Grass; Singles - Doubles	(United Kingdom) Mrs L. Turner (United Kingdom) Herbert Kersey; 6–0, 6–2	(United Kingdom) Frances King-Church (United Kingdom) H.B. Allen	(United Kingdom) L.E. Fanshawe (United Kingdom) Mrs L. Turner	(Wales) Edith Austin (United Kingdom) F.A. King-Church (United Kingdom) Miss F.G. Green (United Kingdom) Miss E.M. Sexton
16 Aug	British Columbia Championships; Victoria LTC; Victoria; Canada; Grass; Singles - Doubles	(Canada) Florence Barkley; 7–5, 6–4	(Canada) Frances Arrowsmith	(Canada) Miss Haigh (Canada) Mrs Pinder	
16 Aug	British Columbia Championships; Victoria LTC; Victoria; Canada; Grass; Singles - Doubles	Challenger (Canada) Anastasia Musgrave		(Canada) Miss Haigh (Canada) Mrs Pinder	
18 Aug	Derbyshire Championships; Buxton LTC; Buxton, England; Grass; Singles - Doubles	(Ireland) Louisa Martin; 6–2, 6–4	(United Kingdom) Mary Steedman	(United Kingdom) G. Crofton (United Kingdom) Bertha Steedman	(Ireland) Connie Butler (United Kingdom) Miss McClintock (England) Helen Jackson (Ireland) Florence Stanuell
18 Aug	Derbyshire Championships; Buxton LTC; Buxton, England; Grass; Singles - Doubles	(United Kingdom) Bertha Steedman (United Kingdom) Mary Steedman; 8–6, 6–8, 6–3	(Ireland) Louisa Martin (Ireland) Florence Stanuell	(United Kingdom) G. Crofton (United Kingdom) Bertha Steedman	(Ireland) Connie Butler (United Kingdom) Miss McClintock (England) Helen Jackson (Ireland) Florence Stanuell
18 Aug	Derbyshire Championships; Buxton LTC; Buxton, England; Grass; Singles - Doubles	(Ireland) Louisa Martin (United Kingdom) James Baldwin; 6–2, 8–10, 6–0	(Ireland) Florence Stanuell (Ireland) Harold Mahony	(United Kingdom) G. Crofton (United Kingdom) Bertha Steedman	(Ireland) Connie Butler (United Kingdom) Miss McClintock (England) Helen Jackson (Ireland) Florence Stanuell
19 Aug	South of Scotland Championships; Beech Grove Grounds; Moffat, Scotland; Grass; Singles - Doubles	(Scotland) Evelyn Blencowe; 6–2, 6–3	(Scotland) E. Malcolm		
19 Aug	South of Scotland Championships; Beech Grove Grounds; Moffat, Scotland; Grass; Singles - Doubles	(Scotland) L. Ferguson (Scotland) Lottie Paterson; 6-1, 6-2	(Scotland) Miss Malcolm (United Kingdom) Miss Snowcroft		
19 Aug	South of Scotland Championships; Beech Grove Grounds; Moffat, Scotland; Grass; Singles - Doubles	(Scotland) Lottie Paterson (Scotland) G. Scott-Jackson; 3–6, 6–3, 6–0	(Scotland) E. Malcolm (Scotland) Richard Millar Watson		
21 Aug	Budleigh Salterton Tournament; Aldeburgh LTC; Budleigh Salterton, England; Grass; Singles - Doubles	(United Kingdom) Mrs Thompson; 6–2, 6–3	(United Kingdom) Miss Talbot		
23 Aug	North of England Championships; South Cliff LTC; Scarborough, England; Grass; Singles - Doubles	(England) Beatrice Wood; 6–4, 6–4	(United Kingdom) M Crosley	(United Kingdom) Mabel Cradock (United Kingdom) Miss Gray	(United Kingdom) B. Anderson (United Kingdom) D. Boulton (England) Annie Kendal
23 Aug	North of England Championships; South Cliff LTC; Scarborough, England; Grass; Singles - Doubles	(United Kingdom) Miss Clark (England) Beatrice Wood; 6–2, 7–5	(United Kingdom) C. Crossley (United Kingdom) Miss Gray	(United Kingdom) Mabel Cradock (United Kingdom) Miss Gray	(United Kingdom) B. Anderson (United Kingdom) D. Boulton (England) Annie Kendal
23 Aug	North of England Championships; South Cliff LTC; Scarborough, England; Grass; Singles - Doubles	(England) Beatrice Wood (United Kingdom) James Baldwin	(United Kingdom) M. Crossley (Ireland) Charles Chaytor	(United Kingdom) Mabel Cradock (United Kingdom) Miss Gray	(United Kingdom) B. Anderson (United Kingdom) D. Boulton (England) Annie Kendal
23 Aug	Torquay Open; Torquay LTC; Torquay, England; Grass; Singles - Doubles	(United Kingdom) Miss E. Wolfe; 7–5, 6–4	(United Kingdom) Miss Fisher	(United Kingdom) Mrs C. Paas Farlow (United Kingdom) Mrs Fowler	(United Kingdom) Miss Dewer (United Kingdom) Miss Peter-Hoblyn (United Kingdom) Miss Martyn
23 Aug	Saxmundham Lawn Tennis Tournament; Hurts Hall Park; Saxmundham, England; Grass; Singles - Doubles	(United Kingdom) Edith Coleridge Cole; 6–4, 6–2	(United Kingdom) Alice Parr	(United Kingdom) Winifred Kersey (United Kingdom) L. Stains	(United Kingdom) Miss Bartlett (United Kingdom) A. Foster (United Kingdom) Emily Manuelle (United Kingdom) Mrs E.C. Roberts
23 Aug	Saxmundham Lawn Tennis Tournament; Hurts Hall Park; Saxmundham, England; Grass; Singles - Doubles	(United Kingdom) Winifred Kersey (United Kingdom) L. Stains; 6–3, 3–6, 6–2	(United Kingdom) Edith Coleridge Cole (United Kingdom) Mrs E. Roberts	(United Kingdom) Winifred Kersey (United Kingdom) L. Stains	(United Kingdom) Miss Bartlett (United Kingdom) A. Foster (United Kingdom) Emily Manuelle (United Kingdom) Mrs E.C. Roberts
23 Aug	Saxmundham Lawn Tennis Tournament; Hurts Hall Park; Saxmundham, England; Grass; Singles - Doubles	(United Kingdom) Miss King-Church (England) Charles Gladstone Allen; 6–4, 7–5	(United Kingdom) K French (United Kingdom) William C. French	(United Kingdom) Winifred Kersey (United Kingdom) L. Stains	(United Kingdom) Miss Bartlett (United Kingdom) A. Foster (United Kingdom) Emily Manuelle (United Kingdom) Mrs E.C. Roberts
25 Aug	Altoona Tennis Tournament; Altoona Cricket Club; Altoona, United States; Grass; Singles - Doubles	(United States) R. Holmes; 1–6, 6–4, 7–5	(United States) Miss Fay	(United States) Miss Bailey (United States) A. Holmes	(United States) Miss Askew (United States) Miss Esterbrook (United States) Miss Kapp
26 Aug	Aldeburgh Lawn Tennis Tournament; Aldeburgh LTC; Aldeburgh, England; Grass; Singles - Doubles	(United Kingdom) Mrs Lang walkover	(United Kingdom) Mrs Stapylton		
30 Aug	Bournemouth Lawn Tennis Club Tournament; Dean Park; Bournemouth, England; Grass; Singles - Doubles	(Ireland) May Langrishe; 6–1, 4–6, 6–3	(United Kingdom) Ivy Arbuthnot	(United Kingdom) Alice Arbuthnot (United Kingdom) May Arbuthnot	(United Kingdom) A. Everett (United Kingdom) M. Stogdon (United Kingdom) K. Stretton
30 Aug	Bournemouth Lawn Tennis Club Tournament; Dean Park; Bournemouth, England; Grass; Singles - Doubles	Challenger (England) Constance Bryan		(United Kingdom) Alice Arbuthnot (United Kingdom) May Arbuthnot	(United Kingdom) A. Everett (United Kingdom) M. Stogdon (United Kingdom) K. Stretton
30 Aug	Bournemouth Lawn Tennis Club Tournament; Dean Park; Bournemouth, England; Grass; Singles - Doubles	(United Kingdom) A Everett (Ireland) May Langrishe; 7–5, 6–2	(United Kingdom) Ivy Arbuthnot (United Kingdom) May Artbuthnot	(United Kingdom) Alice Arbuthnot (United Kingdom) May Arbuthnot	(United Kingdom) A. Everett (United Kingdom) M. Stogdon (United Kingdom) K. Stretton
30 Aug	Bournemouth Lawn Tennis Club Tournament; Dean Park; Bournemouth, England; Grass; Singles - Doubles	(Ireland) May Langrishe (United Kingdom) F. St. B. Haskett-Smith; 5–7, 6–1, 6–4	(United Kingdom) May Arbuthnot (United Kingdom) W.J. Down	(United Kingdom) Alice Arbuthnot (United Kingdom) May Arbuthnot	(United Kingdom) A. Everett (United Kingdom) M. Stogdon (United Kingdom) K. Stretton

=== September ===
Ended	Tournament	Winner	Finalist	Semifinalist	Quarterfinalist
6 Sep	Sussex Championships; Brighton, England; Grass; Singles - Doubles	(Ireland) May Langrishe; 6–1, 6–2	(England) Constance Bryan	(England) Edith Cole (Ireland) Beatrice Langrishe	(United Kingdom) Elsie Pinckney (United Kingdom) Violet Pinckney
6 Sep	Sussex Championships; Brighton, England; Grass; Singles - Doubles	Challenger (United Kingdom) Maud Shackle		(England) Edith Cole (Ireland) Beatrice Langrishe	(United Kingdom) Elsie Pinckney (United Kingdom) Violet Pinckney
6 Sep	Sussex Championships; Brighton, England; Grass; Singles - Doubles	(United Kingdom) Violet Pinckney (United Kingdom) Maud Shackle; 6–3, 6–1	(United Kingdom) B. Pinckney (United Kingdom) Elsie Pinckney	(England) Edith Cole (Ireland) Beatrice Langrishe	(United Kingdom) Elsie Pinckney (United Kingdom) Violet Pinckney
6 Sep	Sussex Championships; Brighton, England; Grass; Singles - Doubles	(United Kingdom) Elsie Pinckney (Ireland) Frank Stoker; 6–4, 3–6, 7–5	(United Kingdom) Maud Shackle (United Kingdom) Wilfred Baddeley	(England) Edith Cole (Ireland) Beatrice Langrishe	(United Kingdom) Elsie Pinckney (United Kingdom) Violet Pinckney
8 Sep	New Hamburg Invitation; New Hamburgh LTC; New Hamburg, United States; Grass; Singles - Doubles	(United States) A. Clarkson; 6–8, 6–3, 6–2	(United States) Grace Roosevelt		
8 Sep	New Hamburg Invitation; New Hamburgh LTC; New Hamburg, United States; Grass; Singles - Doubles	(United States) Ellen Roosevelt (United States) Malcolm Chace; 6–4, 6–4, 6–4	(United States) Miss Lente (United States) Charles Sands		
9 Sep	Pacific States Lawn Tennis Tournament; Hotel San Rafael; San Rafael, United States; Cement; Singles - Doubles	(United States) Maud Wilkinson; 6–2, 6–3	(United States) Miss Barker		
13 Sep	South of England Championships; Devonshire Park LTC; Eastbourne, England; Grass; Singles - Doubles	(Ireland) May Langrishe; 6–2, 6–3	(United Kingdom) Edith Cole		
13 Sep	South of England Championships; Devonshire Park LTC; Eastbourne, England; Grass; Singles - Doubles	(Ireland) May Langrishe (United Kingdom) James Baldwin; 6–1, 6–3	(England) Edith Gurney (United Kingdom) DM Malcolm		
13 Sep	Maine State Championships; Bangor, United States; Grass; Singles - Doubles	(United States) Miss Godfrey Clergue def	(United States) Miss Gertrude Clergue	(United States) Miss Carrie Chapman	
19 Sep	SILC Challenge Cup; Staten Island Cricket Ground; Livingston, United States; Grass; Singles - Doubles	(United States) Lida Voorhees; 6–3, 6–2	(United States) Hilda Stone	(United States) Miss Bailey (United States) Miss Hoag (United States) Miss Le Duc	(United States) Miss M.A. Alexander (United States) Miss Alexander (United States) Miss Foster

=== October ===
Ended	Tournament	Winner	Finalist	Semifinalist	Quarterfinalist
4 Oct	Queensland Championships; Greet Sports Ground; Brisbane, Australia; Grass; Singles - Doubles	(Australia) Mrs. Quinnell; 6–1, 6–0	(Australia) Miss. Earle		
4 Oct	Queensland Championships; Greet Sports Ground; Brisbane, Australia; Grass; Singles - Doubles	(Australia) Miss Lee (Australia) Mr. Haughton; 6–3, 6–1	(Australia) Miss Earle (Australia) Richard John Cottell		

=== November ===
Ended	Tournament	Winner	Finalist	Semifinalist	Quarterfinalist
18 Nov	Victorian Championships; Melbourne Cricket Ground; Melbourne, Australia; Asphalt; Singles - Doubles	(Australia) Mabel Shaw; 6–1, 6–4	(Australia) E. MacKenzie	(Australia) Constance Raleigh (Australia) Phenie Shaw	(Australia) Edith Raleigh
18 Nov	Victorian Championships; Melbourne Cricket Ground; Melbourne, Australia; Asphalt; Singles - Doubles	(Australia) Annie Chenery (Australia) E. MacKenzie; 6–3, 6–5	(Australia) Mabel Shaw (Australia) Phenie Shaw	(Australia) Constance Raleigh (Australia) Phenie Shaw	(Australia) Edith Raleigh
18 Nov	Victorian Championships; Melbourne Cricket Ground; Melbourne, Australia; Asphalt; Singles - Doubles	(Australia) Edith Raleigh (Australia) Alec Chomley; 6–3, 7–9, 6–2	(Australia) E MacKenzie (Australia) Charles Cropper	(Australia) Constance Raleigh (Australia) Phenie Shaw	(Australia) Edith Raleigh

=== December/Jan (1891) ===
Ended	Tournament	Winner	Finalist	Semifinalist	Quarterfinalist
30 Dec – 3 Jan 1891	New Zealand Championships; Carisbrooke Cricket Ground; Dunedin, New Zealand; Grass; Singles - Doubles	(New Zealand) E. Gordon; 7–5, 7–5	(New Zealand) Ruth Orbell	(New Zealand) Miss Campbell (New Zealand) Mrs George Way	(New Zealand) Nina Douslin (New Zealand) Hilda Hitchings (New Zealand) Miss Grant (New Zealand) Fanny Ollivier
30 Dec – 3 Jan 1891	New Zealand Championships; Carisbrooke Cricket Ground; Dunedin, New Zealand; Grass; Singles - Doubles	(New Zealand) E. Gordon (New Zealand) Miss Harman; 6–1, 6–2	(New Zealand) Ruth Orbell (New Zealand) Miss Rattray	(New Zealand) Miss Campbell (New Zealand) Mrs George Way	(New Zealand) Nina Douslin (New Zealand) Hilda Hitchings (New Zealand) Miss Grant (New Zealand) Fanny Ollivier
30 Dec – 3 Jan 1891	New Zealand Championships; Carisbrooke Cricket Ground; Dunedin, New Zealand; Grass; Singles - Doubles	(New Zealand) Miss F. Rattray (New Zealand) A.E Gibbs; 9–7, 6–4	(New Zealand) Miss Smith (New Zealand) J.M. McKerras	(New Zealand) Miss Campbell (New Zealand) Mrs George Way	(New Zealand) Nina Douslin (New Zealand) Hilda Hitchings (New Zealand) Miss Grant (New Zealand) Fanny Ollivier

== Unofficial World Rankings ==
Source:Karoly Mazak
No	Player	Country
1	(Ireland) Louisa Martin	Ireland
1	(Ireland) Lena Rice	Ireland
3	(Ireland) May Langrishe	Ireland
4	(United Kingdom of Great Britain and Ireland) Mary Steedman	Great Britain
5	(England) May Jacks	England
6	(United Kingdom of Great Britain and Ireland) Maud Shackle	Great Britain
7	(Ireland) Lilian Pine-Coffin	Ireland
8	(United States) Ellen Roosevelt	United States

== Tournament winners (singles) ==
This is a list of winners by the total number of singles titles won for 1890 major titles in bold:

- (England) May Jacks –Bayswater, Beckenham, London, West Kensington, West Kensington II, (**5**)
- (Ireland) Louisa Martin – Bath, Buxton, **Irish Championships** (**3**)
- (Ireland) May Langrishe – Bournemouth, brighton, Eastbourne, (**3**)
- (England) Beatrice Wood – Ilkley, Scarborough, Sheffield, (**3**)
- (Ireland) Mabel Cahill – Hastings-on-Hudson, Livingston, South Orange, (**3**)
- (Ireland) Lena Rice – Dublin, **Wimbledon Championships**, (**2**)
- (United Kingdom) Mary Steedman – Chiswick Park, **Northern Championships**, (**2**)
- (England) Helen Jackson – Edinburgh, Newcastle upon Tyne, (**2**)
- (New Zealand) Ruth Orbell – Dunedin, Dunedin II, (**2**)
- (United States) Ellen Roosevelt – **U.S.National Championships**, (**1**)
- (India) Edith Morgan – Madras, (**1**)
- (New Zealand) Miss Spiers – Auckland, (**1**)
- (Wales) Edith Austin – Pau, (**1**)
- (England) Miss Leigh – Cannes, (**1**)
- (Australia) Maisie Parr – Adelaide, (**1**)
- (Colony of Natal) Norah Hickman – Durban, (**2**)
- (Dominion of Ceylon) Miss Wynniatt – Nuwara Eliya, (**1**)
- (Australia) Ellen Mayne – Sydney, (**1**)
- (England) Jane Corder – Hexham, (**1**)
- (England) Alice Brown – Ealing, (**1**)
- (United Kingdom) May Arbuthnot – Surbiton, (**1**)
- (United Kingdom) Katherine Grey – Hull, (**1**)
- (Scotland) Lottie Paterson – Edinburgh II, (**1**)
- (England) Constance Bryan – Cheltenham, (**1**)
- (United States) Miss Doolittle – Kearney, (**1**)
- (United Kingdom) A. Kinahan – Belfast, (**1**)
- (England) L. Johnstone – Edgbaston, (**1**)
- (United States) Helen Hellwig – Brooklyn, (**1**)
- (United Kingdom) Miss Rome – Nottingham, (**1**)
- (England) Ida Cressy – Llandudno, (**1**)
- (Netherlands) M. Bol – Scheveningen, (**1**)
- (United Kingdom) Alice Pickering – Leamington Spa, (**1**)
- (United Kingdom) E. Malden – Sittingbourne, (**1**)
- (United Kingdom) Mrs A. Thompson – Felixstowe, (**1**)
- (Canada) Miss Wiltshire – Truro, (**1**)
- (England) Lottie Dod – Darlington, (**1**)
- (United States) Miss F. Shoemaker – Redondo Beach, (**1**)
- (Ireland) Lilian Pine-Coffin – Exmouth, (**1**)
- (United Kingdom) Mrs Thompson – Budleigh, (**1**)
- (Scotland) Miss Moir – Wemyss Bay, (**1**)
- (Canada) Florence Barkley – Victoria, (**1**)
- (United Kingdom) Florence Thompson – Felixstowe II, (**1**)
- (Scotland) Evelyn Blencowe – Moffat, (**1**)
- (United Kingdom) Miss Wolfe – Torquay, (**1**)
- (England) Edith Cole – Saxmundham, (**1**)
- (United States) R. Holmes – Altoona, (**1**)
- (United Kingdom) Mrs Lang – Aldeburgh, (**1**)
- (United States) A. Clarkson – New Hamburgh, (**1**)
- (United States) Maud Wilkinson – San Rafael, (**1**)
- (United States) Miss McKinlay – New York City, (**1**)
- (Australia) May Quinnell – Brisbane, (**1**)
- (United States) Lida Voorhees – Livingston, (**1**)
- (United States) Miss Godfrey Clergue – Bangor, (**1**)
- (Australia) Mabel Shaw – Melbourne, (**1**)
- (New Zealand) E. Gordon – Dunedin III, (**1**)

== Statistical summary ==
=== Singles ===
- Total Tournaments (81)
- Most Titles: (England) May Jacks (5)
- Most Finals: (England) May Jacks (7)
- Most Matches Played: (England) May Jacks (20)
- Most Matches Won: (England) May Jacks (18)
- Match Winning %: (Ireland) Louisa Martin (100%) min 10 matches & (England) May Jacks (90%) min 20 matches
- Most Tournaments Played: (England) May Jacks (7)

== Sources ==
- Bartlett, Michael and Gillen, Bob. (1981) The Tennis Book, edited by Michael Bartlett and Bob Gillen, Arbor House, New York, ISBN 0-87795-344-9
- Collins, Bud. Total Tennis:The Ultimate Tennis Encyclopedia, Sport Classic Books, Toronto, Canada, ISBN 0-9731443-4-3.
- Crips, Mark (10 May 2022). In Pursuit of the Slam: My Year Travelling to Tennis's Top Four Tournaments (5 ed.). Manchester: i2.i Publishing. ISBN 9781914933981.
- Garcia, Gabriel. "Season: 1890". The Tennis Base. Madrid, Spain: Tennismem SAL.
- Hughes, G.P. Dunlop Lawn Tennis Almanack And Tournament Guide, G.P. Hughes.
- Lowe, Sir F. Gordon. Lowe's Lawn Tennis Annuals and Compendia, Eyre & Spottiswoode. London, England.
- Robertson, Max (1974). The Encyclopedia of Tennis. London: Allen & Unwin. ISBN 9780047960420.
- Someren, Janine van (December 2010). "3: The Amateur Tennis Circuit". Women's Sporting Lives: A biographical study of elite amateur tennis players at Wimbledon. A thesis for the degree of Doctor of Philosophy. Southampton, England: University of Southampton Research Repository.
- Wallis Myers A. Ayre's Lawn Tennis Almanack And Tournament Guide, London, England.
