= Fitzwilliam Plate =

Defunct tennis tournament
- Founded: 1883; 142 years ago
- Abolished: 1900; 125 years ago
- Location: Dublin, Ireland
- Venue: Fitzwilliam Lawn Tennis Club
- Surface: Grass

The Fitzwilliam Plate also known as the Irish Championships Consolation Plate was a tennis competition held at the Irish Championships. The tournament consisted of players that lost in the second round of the all comers singles event. The first edition, for male players only, was held in 1883. The event was discontinued in 1900.

== History ==
TheFitzwilliam Plate was a tennis tournament founded in 1883 for players who had lost in the second round of the Irish Lawn Tennis Championships. It was played at the Fitzwilliam Lawn Tennis Club, Dublin, Ireland. The tournament was staged annually until 1900 when it was discontinued.

The Fitzwilliam Purse was another tournament established in 1883 that was for players who were defeated in the first round of the Irish Championships, that tournament also ended in 1901.

== Finals ==
(Incomplete roll)

Year	Winners	Runners-up	Score
1883	(England) George Arnulph Montgomerie	(Scotland) Percy Greene	6–3 6–1.
1884	(Ireland) Maxwell John Carpendale	(England) Edward Lake Williams	6–2 6–2.
1885	(Ireland) Herbert Knox McKay	(England) William Taylor	6–3, 7–5, 6–2.
1886	(Ireland) Grainger Chaytor	(Ireland) Francis Woodcock Perry	3–6, 6–2, 6–4, 6–2.
1887	(United Kingdom) Herbert Wilberforce	(Ireland) Grainger Chaytor	9–7, 3–6, 3–6, 6–3, 6–3.
1888	(England) James Baldwin	(England) Ernest George Meers	9–7, 6–3, 6–3.
1890	(Ireland) Harold Mahony	(England) Wilfred L Parker	6–2, 6–2, 6–1.
1894	(Ireland) Grainger Chaytor	(England) Frank Stoker	6–1, 6–2, 4–6, 6–4.
1896	(United Kingdom) Edward Roy Allen	(Switzerland) Charles Henry Martin	7–5, 6–1, 4–6, 6–1.
1897	(United Kingdom) George Greville	(Ireland) Richard Clifford	6–1, 7–5, 6–1.
1898	(United Kingdom) Harold Adair Nisbet	(Ireland) George Ball-Greene	6–0, 6–3, 1–6, 6–3.
1899	(United Kingdom) George Caridia	(United Kingdom) Arthur Henry Riseley	6–3, 7–5.

== See also ==
- All England Plate (competition for second round losers at the Wimbledon Championships)
