= Smash (tennis) =

Tennis technique

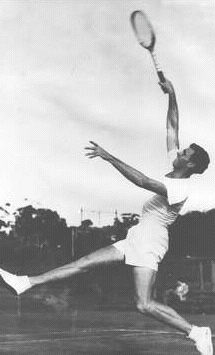
Ken McGregor hitting a smash in the early 1950s

A smash in tennis is a shot that is hit above the hitter's head with a serve-like motion. It is also referred to as an overhead. A smash can usually be hit with a high amount of force and is often a shot that ends the point. Most smashes are hit fairly near the net or in mid-court before the ball bounces, generally against lobs that have not been hit high enough or deep enough by the opponent. A player can also smash a very high ball from the baseline, generally on the bounce, although this is often a less forceful smash.

Smash commonly refers to the forehand smash; backhand smashes are rarer and more difficult to execute, especially for beginners, since they are basically high backhand volleys generally hit at an exact angle causing the ball to spin. Rod Laver and Jimmy Connors, both left-handers, were known for their very powerful backhand smashes. The forehand smash was first used in Tennis by Helena Rice on championship point in the 1890 Wimbledon Championships final.

In his 1979 autobiography Jack Kramer, who had a fine overhead himself, devotes a page to the best tennis strokes he had ever seen. He writes: "OVERHEAD—Schroeder just tops here, ahead of Rosewall and Newcombe.

== Grip and action ==
The grip used for a tennis smash is usually a continental grip although some players use an Eastern grip. The swing is an upward throwing motion, making the execution of the shot almost identical to a serve. The main difference from a serve is position and footwork. The positioning and footwork are more similar to a volley which is usually hit with a strong forward weight transfer from inside the court. The smash can be executed with one or both feet on the ground.

Jimmy Connors invented and popularized the skyhook, a version of the overhead smash in which the Eastern grip used to hit the ball further behind the body than is possible with a traditional overhead smash.

Pete Sampras (and before him Yannick Noah) popularized the jump smash, where the player jumps and then hits the smash in mid-air. The shot is often also called a slam dunk, as in basketball.

== See also ==
- Glossary of tennis terms
- Tennis shots
- Smash Tennis - The video game
