= Fitzwilliam Purse =

Defunct tennis tournament
- Founded: 1884; 142 years ago
- Abolished: 1901; 125 years ago
- Location: Dublin, Ireland
- Venue: Fitzwilliam Lawn Tennis Club
- Surface: Grass

The Fitzwilliam Purse, was a tennis competition held at the Irish Championships. The tournament consisted of players who had lost in the first round of the singles event. The first edition, for male players only, was held in 1884. The event was discontinued after the 1901 event.

== History ==
The Fitzwilliam Purse was a tennis tournament founded in 1884 for players who had lost in the first round of the Irish Lawn Tennis Championships. It was played at the Fitzwilliam Lawn Tennis Club, Dublin, Ireland. The tournament was staged annually until 1901 when it was discontinued.

The Fitzwilliam Plate was another tournament established in 1883 that was for players who were defeated in the second round of the Irish Championships, that tournament also ended in 1901.

== Finals ==
=== Men's singles ===
(Incomplete roll)

Year	Winner	Runner-up	Score
1884	(England) Ernest Wool Lewis	(Ireland) Robert Shaw Templer	6-1, 1–6, 6–2.
1885	(Ireland) Charles Henry Chaytor	(England) George Arnulph Montgomerie	4-6, 6–2, 2–6, 6–4, 6–0.
1886	(Ireland) David Grainger Chaytor	(Ireland) Francis Woodcock Perry	3-6, 6–3, 6–4, 6-2 .
1887	(Scotland) Patrick Bowes-Lyon	(England) Harry Grove	8-6, 8–6, 6–3.
1888	(Ireland) Tom Campion	(England) George Hillyard	won.
1889	(England) Ernest Wool Lewis	(Ireland) Joshua Pim	3 sets to 1.
1890	(Ireland) David Grainger Chaytor	(England) George Hillyard	6-1, 6–3, 6–2.
1892	(United Kingdom) Ernest George Meers	(United Kingdom) Harry Sibthorpe Barlow	6-3, 6–1, 7–5.
1893	(Ireland) Frank Owen Stoker	(England) Horace Chapman	8-6, 6–1, 1–6, 6–2.
1894	(United Kingdom) Reginald Doherty	(Switzerland) Charles Henry Martin	4-6, 6–0, retd.
1896	(United Kingdom) Edward Roy Allen	(United Kingdom) Harold Adair Nisbet	6-1, 6–3, 6–3.
1898	(United Kingdom) Harold Adair Nisbet	(Ireland) George Ball-Greene	6-3, 2–6, 6–3, 6–2.
1899	(United Kingdom) George Caridia	(United Kingdom) Arthur Henry Riseley	6-3, 7–5.
1901	(United Kingdom) Wilberforce Eaves	(Ireland) Walter Herbert Boyd	6-3, 6–2, 6–1.
