= Queen's Cup (tennis) =

Defunct tennis tournament
- Tour: LTA Circuit
- Founded: 1890; 136 years ago
- Abolished: 1891; 135 years ago
- Editions: 2
- Location: West Kensington, Middlesex, England
- Venue: Queen's Club
- Surface: Grass

The Queen's Cup was a combined British LTA affiliated grass court tournament founded in 1890. Also known as the Queen's Club Open, it was played at the Queen's Club, West Kensington, Middlesex, England until 1892.

The tournament featured two singles events a gold challenge cup for men and a ladies silver cup and was usually played in late July annually.

== Finals ==
=== Men's Singles ===
Queen's Challenge Cup

Year	Winners	Runners-up	Score
1890	(Ireland) Grainger Chaytor	(United Kingdom) Ernest Wool Lewis	6-3, 6-1
1891	(Ireland) Joshua Pim	(Ireland) Harold Mahony	2-6, 6-1, 6-2, 6-3

=== Men's Doubles ===
Year	Winners	Runners-up	Score
1890	(United Kingdom of Great Britain and Ireland) Herbert Baddeley (United Kingdom of Great Britain and Ireland) Wilfred Baddeley	(United Kingdom of Great Britain and Ireland) Harry S. Barlow (Ireland) Harold Mahony	7-5, 6–2, 9-7

=== Women's Singles ===
Queen's Ladies Cup

Year	Winners	Runners-up	Score
1890	(United Kingdom) May Jacks	(United Kingdom) Maud Shackle	default
1891	(United Kingdom) Maud Shackle	(United Kingdom) Ruth Legh	2-6, 6-2, 6-0
