= Harry Scrivener =

English tennis player (1865–1937)

- Full name: Harry Stanley Scrivener
- Country (sports): GBR
- Born: 1 October 1865; London, England
- Died: 18 August 1937 (age 71); Wimbledon, London, England
- Turned pro: 1882 (amateur tour)
- Retired: 1890

Singles
- Career record: 31–7
- Career titles: 2

Grand Slam singles results
- Wimbledon: QR (1888, 1890)

Doubles

Grand Slam doubles results
- Wimbledon: SF (1893)

Harry Stanley Scrivener born (1 October 1865 – 18 August 1937) was an English tennis player and founder of the Lawn Tennis Association who later became a tennis referee. He was a two time quarter finalist in the men's singles at the Wimbledon Championships in 1888 and 1890. He was active from 1882 to 1893 and won 2 career singles titles.

== Career ==
Harry was born in London on 1 October 1865, the only son of Thomas Partington Scrivener, a chartered accountant and colonel in the Volunteer Rifle Corps, and his wife Ann Eliza Gibbon. He played his first singles tournament at the Berrylands Club Tournament that tournament later became the Surrey County Championships. Educated at St Paul's School, London and Magdalen College, Oxford, where he was president of the Oxford Lawn Tennis Club in 1888, he read for the bar and was called as a barrister at the Middle Temple in 1891.

In major tournaments of his time he was a two time quarter finalist in the men's singles at the Wimbledon Championships in 1888 and 1890, as well as a semi finalist in the men's doubles in 1893 partnered with Manliffe Goodbody (Ireland). In addition he was a quarter finalist at the Northern Championships in 1888, and a semi finalist at the 1890 Irish Championships.

He was active from 1882 to 1893 and won 2 career singles titles at the Midland Counties Championships and Oxford University Champion Tournament both in 1888. He was a semifinalist in the men's doubles at Wimbledon in 1893, with his partner Manliffe Goodbody. Scrivener was a founder of the British Lawn Tennis Association and after retiring from competing himself he became a Wimbledon referee.

During the First World War, he served in the Royal Army Service Corps, reaching the rank of Major. He was twice married, firstly, in 1911, to Mabel Jane Smith, who died in 1917. His second wife, whom he married later that year, was Janet Frances Bowbrick, with whom he had a son.
