= Irish Hard Court Championships =

Defunct tennis tournament
- Founded: 1924
- Abolished: 1973
- Location: Dublin, County Dublin; Republic of Ireland
- Venue: Fitzwilliam Lawn Tennis Club (1924-1936); Elm Park Lawn Tennis Club (1937-1951); Fitzwilliam Lawn Tennis Club (1952-1973)
- Surface: Clay

The Irish Hard Court Championships was an early combined men's and women's clay court tennis tournament founded in 1924. The first championships was played at the Fitzwilliam Lawn Tennis Club, Dublin, County Dublin, Ireland. The tournament ran annually for fifteen editions until 1973.

== History ==
The Irish Hard Court Championships tournament was inaugurated in 1924 and quickly became one of the most popular and important fixtures in the Irish tennis calendar. The championships initially were staged in the spring in April, and occasionally late summer and early autumn. In 1937, the championships were moved to the Elm Park Lawn Tennis Club in Dublin, which had finished completion of four cement courts and five grass courts (front courts) in 1936, where they remained until 1951. In 1952, the championships were moved back to the original venue the Fitzwilliam Lawn Tennis Club

The Irish Hard Court Championships continued to be held during and after World War Two, a period during which there was no noticeable fall-off in entrants for such tournaments. In 1952, the tournament returned to its original venue at Fitzwilliam Lawn Tennis Club, which was then located in Wilton Place. The eventual demise of the Irish Hard Court Championships appears to have occurred due to onset of open era tennis starting in 1968. It continued to be staged until 1973, when it was abolished.

== Sources ==
- Club History. elmpark.ie. Dublin, Ireland: Elm Park Golf & Sports Club. Retrieved 4 December 2022.
- Freeman's Journal (Tuesday 4 March 1924). Irish Hard Court Championships at Wilton Place. Dublin, Republic of Ireland.
- McBride, Doreen (14 July 2022). We Just Got On With It: Changes Before, During and After the Second World War in Northern Ireland. Cheltenham: The History Press. ISBN 978-0-7509-9878-9.
