= Killiney and Ballybrack Championships =

Defunct tennis tournament
- Founded: 1886
- Abolished: 1892
- Location: Ballybrack, Killiney and Ballybrack, County Dublin, Ireland
- Venue: Ballybrack Lawn Tennis Club
- Surface: Grass (outdoor)

The Killiney and Ballybrack Championships was a late Victorian period tennis tournament first established in 1886 at Ballybrack, Killiney and Ballybrack, County Dublin, Ireland and played on outdoor grass courts at the Killiney and Ballybrack Lawn Tennis Club, Killiney and Ballybrack, County Dublin, Ireland/ The tournament was staged until 1892 before it was discontinued.

== History ==
The Killiney and Ballybrack Championships was a late Victorian era combined men's and women's tennis tournament established in 1886 at Ballybrack, Killiney and Ballybrack, County Dublin, Ireland that was staged until 1892.

== Finals ==
=== Men's Singles ===
(Incomplete roll)

- 1886— (Ireland) Willoughby Hamilton def. (Ireland) Grainger Chaytor, 12–10, 0–6, 6–3, 5–7, 14–12.

=== Women's Singles ===
(Incomplete roll)

- 1886— (Ireland) May Langrishe def. (Ireland) Beatrice Langrishe, 6–4, 3–6, 6–1.
