= Oxford University Championship =

Defunct tennis tournament
- Founded: 1880; 146 years ago
- Abolished: 1889; 137 years ago
- Location: Norham Gardens, Oxford, Oxfordshire, England
- Venue: Oxford University Lawn Tennis Club
- Surface: Clay

The Oxford University Championship was a men's grass court closed tennis tournament organised by the Oxford University Lawn Tennis Club, and played at Norham Gardens, Oxford, Oxfordshire, England founded in 1880 as the Oxford University Champion Tournament to 1889.

== History ==
The Oxford University Tournament was a late 19th century tennis event first staged around June 1881 at Norham Gardens, Oxford, Oxfordshire, England. It was a closed tournament for current or former students of Oxford University. The first recorded winner of the men's singles was Britain's Robert Braddell. The final known edition was in 1888 that was won by England's Harry Stanley Scrivener.

== Finals ==
=== Men's Singles ===
(Incomplete roll)

Year	Champion	Runner-up	Score
1881	(United Kingdom) Robert Braddell	(England) Thomas P. Dimond	6–4, 8–6, 6–2
1882	(United Kingdom) Edward B. C. Curtis	(Scotland) John Galbraith Horn	3–6, 6–4, 6–0, 3–6, 7–5
1883	(United Kingdom) Robert T. Milford	(England) Herbert C. Knox	6–4, 6–3, 6–5
1885	(England) Thomas Grey	(England) J.S. Burton	6–3, 5–7, 6–3, 6–3
1886	(England) Howard Pease	(England) William P. Wethered	6–3, 6–2, 2–6, 3–6, 6–1
1887	(England) Thomas M. Burton	(England) Harry Scrivener	2–6, 6–3, 6–2, 4–6, 8–6
1888	(England) Harry Scrivener	?	?
1889	(United Kingdom) Arthur Grant	(United Kingdom) Harold Carlton	4–6, 6–3, 0–6, 6–2, 6–2

|}

== Venue ==
The Oxford University Lawn Tennis Club (OULTC) was founded in 1879 that consisted of 12 grass courts laid out for the inaugural Oxford University Men's Doubles Championships, which were held in May of the same year. In 1927 the club's name was changed to the Norham Gardens Lawn Tennis Club which is still in existence today.
