= 1890 Wimbledon Championships – Men's singles =

Tennis tournament held in 1890

Men's singles
- 1890 Wimbledon Championships

Final
- Champion: (United Kingdom) Willoughby Hamilton
- Runner-up: (United Kingdom) William Renshaw
- Score: 6–8, 6–2, 3–6, 6–1, 6–1

Details
- Draw: 30
- Seeds: –

Events
Singles	men	women
Doubles	men	women
← 1889 ·	Wimbledon Championships	· 1891 →

Willoughby Hamilton defeated Harry Barlow, 2–6, 6–4, 6–4, 4–6, 7–5 in the All Comers' Final, and then defeated the reigning champion William Renshaw, 6–8, 6–2, 3–6, 6–1, 6–1 in the challenge round to win the gentlemen's singles tennis title at the 1890 Wimbledon Championships.

== Draw ==
=== Key ===
- Q = Qualifier
- WC = Wild card
- LL = Lucky loser
- Alt = Alternate
- SE = Special exempt
- PR = Protected ranking
- ITF = ITF entry
- JE = Junior exempt
- w/o = Walkover
- r = Retired
- d = Defaulted
- SR = Special ranking

=== Challenge round ===
Challenge Round
(United Kingdom) Willoughby Hamilton	6	6	3	6	6
(United Kingdom) William Renshaw	8	2	6	1	1

=== All comers' finals ===
Semifinals
(United Kingdom) Joshua Pim	6	4	4	2
(United Kingdom) Willoughby Hamilton	0	6	6	6
(United Kingdom) Ernest Lewis	5	4	6	5
(United Kingdom) Harry Barlow	7	6	4	7

Final
(United Kingdom) Willoughby Hamilton	2	6	6	4	7
(United Kingdom) Harry Barlow	6	4	4	6	5

=== Top half ===
First round
(United Kingdom) Joshua Pim	7	9	6	6
(United Kingdom) Oswald Milne	5	11	3	2
(United Kingdom) Harry Scrivener	7	9	0
(United Kingdom) Herbert Wilberforce	5	7	0^{r}
(United Kingdom) Wilberforce Eaves	6	3	6	0	6
(United Kingdom) FA Bowlby	4	6	0	6	4
(United Kingdom) William Taylor
(United Kingdom) FL Rawson	w/o
(United Kingdom) Arthur Gore	0	1	1
(United Kingdom) Willoughby Hamilton	6	6	6
(United Kingdom) Andrew Ziffo	2	4	3
(United Kingdom) George Mewburn	6	6	6
(United Kingdom) Wilfred Baddeley	6	6	6
(United Kingdom) AW Andrews	0	3	0

Second round
(United Kingdom) Manliffe Goodbody	w/o
(United Kingdom) J Pim
(United Kingdom) H Scrivener	6	6	4	9
(United Kingdom) W Eaves	4	1	6	7
(United Kingdom) W Taylor	5	1	1
(United Kingdom) W Hamilton	7	6	6
(United Kingdom) G Mewburn	4	6	2
(United Kingdom) W Baddeley	6	8	6

Quarterfinals
(United Kingdom) J Pim	6	12	6
(United Kingdom) H Scrivener	3	10	0
(United Kingdom) W Hamilton	6	6	6
(United Kingdom) W Baddeley	3	0	1

Semifinals
(United Kingdom) J Pim	6	4	4	2
(United Kingdom) W Hamilton	0	6	6	6

=== Bottom half ===
First round
(United Kingdom) Herbert Lawford
(United Kingdom) Archibald Thomson	w/o
(United States) Deane Miller	6	6	5	4	6
(United Kingdom) Harold Mahony	4	1	7	6	2
(United Kingdom) Ernest Lewis	6	6	6
(United Kingdom) Horace Chapman	4	3	4
(United Kingdom) Ernest Meers	6	6	6
(United Kingdom) A Walker	1	1	2
(United Kingdom) Herbert Baddeley
(United Kingdom) Ernest Renshaw	w/o
(United Kingdom) Grainger Chaytor	6	6	6
(United Kingdom) Charles Lacy Sweet	3	2	1
(United Kingdom) George Hillyard
(United Kingdom) Charles Ross	w/o

Second round
(United Kingdom) H Lawford	w/o
(United States) D Miller
(United Kingdom) E Lewis	6	6	2	4	6
(United Kingdom) E Meers	3	2	6	6	2
(United Kingdom) H Baddeley	4	3	3
(United Kingdom) G Chaytor	6	6	6
(United Kingdom) G Hillyard	1	0	3
(United Kingdom) Harry Barlow	6	6	6

Quarterfinals
(United States) D Miller	3	1	1
(United Kingdom) E Lewis	6	6	6
(United Kingdom) G Chaytor	10	4	6	1	1
(United Kingdom) H Barlow	8	6	2	6	6

Semifinals
(United Kingdom) E Lewis	5	4	6	5
(United Kingdom) H Barlow	7	6	4	7

Preceded by 1889 U.S. National Championships – Men's singles	Grand Slam men's singles	Succeeded by 1891 U.S. National Championships – Men's singles
