= Queen's Club Covered Court Championship =

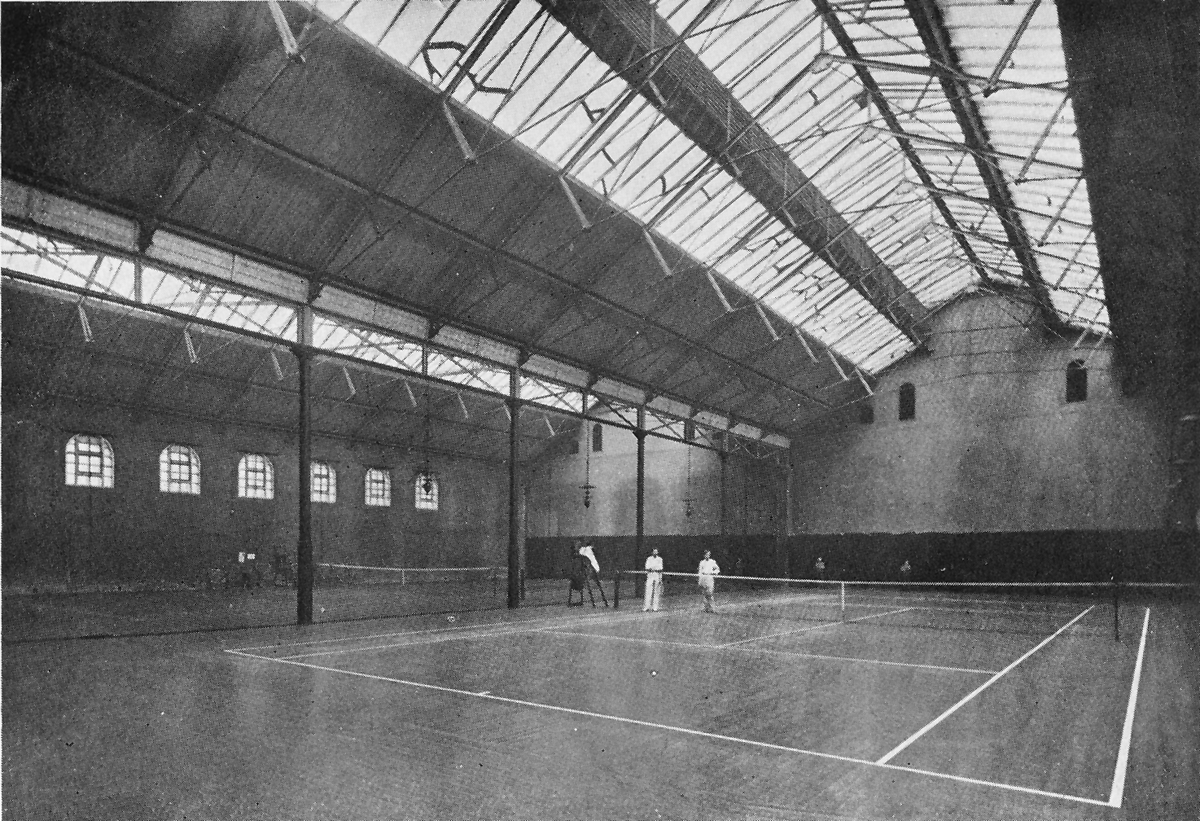

Defunct tennis tournament
- Event name: Queens Covered Court Tournament; Queens Club Covered Court Championship
- Tour: ILTF World Circuit (1913–39)
- Founded: 1890; 135 years ago
- Abolished: 1939; 86 years ago
- Location: London, England
- Venue: Queen's Club
- Surface: Wood / indoor

The Queen's Club Covered Court Championship was a men's and women's indoor wood court tennis tournament founded in 1890. Also known as the Queens Club Covered Court Tournament. The tournament was first played at the Queen's Club, London, England. It was played annually till 1939.

== History ==
In March 1890 the Queen's Club Covered Court Championship was established. The inaugural singles champions were Harry S. Barlow (men) and May Jacks (women). The men's event in the early 1890s was sometimes held at the Hyde Park Club's indoor courts at, Bayswater, London. The tournament was staged annually usually in March or sometimes early April until 1939 when it was discontinued due to World War II.

== Finals ==
=== Men's singles ===
(incomplete roll)

Year	Champions	Runners-up	Score
1890	(United Kingdom) Harry S. Barlow	(United Kingdom) Ernest George Meers	3–2 sets.
1891	(United Kingdom) Ernest Wool Lewis	(United Kingdom) Harry S. Barlow	walkover.
1892	(United Kingdom) Ernest Wool Lewis (2)	(United Kingdom) Horace Chapman	6–3, 5–7, 6–4.
1893	(United Kingdom) Horace Chapman	(United Kingdom) John May	6–0, 6–2.
1896	(United Kingdom) Harold Mahony	(United Kingdom) Wilberforce Eaves	6–0, 6–2.
1924	(India) Sydney Jacob	(United Kingdom) Teddy Higgs	6–3, 5–7, 6–4.
1930	(United Kingdom) Ted Avory	(Portugal) S. D. Jose de Verda	8–6, 2–6, 6–3.

=== Women's singles ===
(incomplete roll)

Year	Champions	Runners-up	Score
1890	(England) May Jacks	(United Kingdom) Mary Pick	6–0, 6–2
1892	(England) May Jacks (2)	(United Kingdom) May Arbuthnot	3–6, 6–2, 6–2
1893	(United Kingdom) Maud Shackle	(United Kingdom) Lilian Arbuthnot	6–1, 1–6, 7–5

== See also ==
- Queen's Club
