= Aldeburgh Open =

Aldeburgh Open Aldeburgh Open Hard Courts

Defunct tennis tournament
- Tour: ILTF Circuit (1913=38)
- Founded: 1884; 141 years ago
- Abolished: 1938; 87 years ago
- Location: Aldeburgh-on-Sea, Suffolk, England
- Venue: Aldeburgh LTC
- Surface: Grass (1884-23); Clay (1924-38)

The Aldeburgh Open and later known as the Aldeburgh Open Hard Courts was a men's and women's international grass court tennis tournament founded in 1884 as the Aldeburgh Lawn Tennis Tournament. The tournament was organised by the Aldeburgh LTC and first staged at the West Hill grounds, Aldeburgh-on-Sea, Suffolk, England. In 1924 the event switched to clay courts. The tournament ran annually until 1939 when it was discontinued because of World War II.

== History ==
In 1884 the Aldeburgh Lawn Tennis tournament was established. The tournament was held annually through till 1914 when it was discontinued due to World War I. Initially it was played on grass tennis courts, it resumed in 1920 and in 1923 the event switched to hard clay courts and was known as the Aldeburgh Open Hard Courts. The event continued to be held through till 1938. In 1939 it was discontinued because of World War II.

== Finals ==
=== Men's singles ===
Incomplete roll included:

Year	Winners	Runners-up	Score
Aldeburgh Lawn Tennis Tournament.
1888	(United Kingdom) F.E. Haward	(United Kingdom) H. Favarger	6-2, 4-6, 8-6
1890	(United Kingdom) F.E. Haward	(United Kingdom) Rupert L. Hamblin-Smith	7-5, 6-3
1891	(United Kingdom) Alexander W. Miller White	(United Kingdom) Charles Sidney Cullingham	5-7, 6-2, 6-2
1892	(United Kingdom) Herbert Owen Ransome	(United Kingdom) Rupert L. Hamblin-Smith	6-1, 6-2, 6-3
1893	(United Kingdom) Herbert Owen Ransome (2)	(United Kingdom) Rupert L. Hamblin-Smith	7-5, 5-7, 6-1
1894	(Australia) Robert Baldock Scott	(United Kingdom) Rupert L. Hamblin-Smith	w.o.
Aldeburgh Open
1908	(United Kingdom) Edward Gordon Cleather	(United Kingdom) Charles Richard Longe	6-1, 6-2
1914/1918	Not held (due to world war one)		
1920	(United Kingdom) Hugh Walter Davies	(South Africa) Harold Aitken	6-3, 6-4
1922	(United Kingdom) Henry Alfred Carless	(United Kingdom) B.S. Foster	7-5, 6-8, 6-3
Aldeburgh Open Hard Courts
1923	(New Zealand) J.F. Park	(United Kingdom) J.K. Stanford	6-3, 6-3
1931	(New Zealand) James Giesen	(United Kingdom) Brian William Finnigan	9-11, 7-5, 6-3
1935	(United Kingdom) Brian William Finnigan	(United Kingdom) G.C. Pryse-Rice	2-6, 8-6, 6-0

=== Women's singles ===
(Incomplete roll)

Year	Champions	Runners-up	Score
Aldeburgh Lawn Tennis Tournament.
1890	(United Kingdom) Mrs Lang	(United Kingdom) Mrs Stapylton	walkover
1891	(United Kingdom) Toupie Lowther	(United Kingdom) Miss Carter	6-4, 0-6, 6-4
Aldeburgh Open
1908	(United Kingdom) Lavinia Radeglia	(United Kingdom) May Morris	4-6, 6-2, 6-2
1909	(United Kingdom) Dorothy Holman	(United Kingdom) E.G. Willis	6-0, 6-2
1910	(United Kingdom) Miss Stogdon	(United Kingdom) N. Stanford	6-1, 6-0
1911	(United Kingdom) Mildred Brooksmith	(United Kingdom) Charlotte Everard	6-2, 6-0
1912	(United Kingdom) Daisy Clark Kercheval-Hole	(United Kingdom) Mrs Reynolds	6-2, 6-0
1913	(United Kingdom) Mildred Brooksmith (2)	(United Kingdom) E.M. Brogden	6-2, 6-3
1914/1918	Not held (due to world war one)		
1920	(United Kingdom) Dorothy Kemmis-Betty	(United Kingdom) Mrs Hind	6-3, 6-4
1921	(United Kingdom) Mrs Darbishire	(United Kingdom) N. Welch	4-6, 6-3, 6-3
Aldeburgh Open Hard Courts
1922	(United Kingdom) Dorothy Kemmis-Betty (2)	(United Kingdom) Violet Southam	6-1, 6-0
1923	(United Kingdom) Violet Southam	(United Kingdom) Joan Ridley	6-4, 5-7, 6-3
1924	(United Kingdom) Nancy Palmer Edwards	(United Kingdom) M.C. Hervey	6-4, 6-1
1925	(United Kingdom) Nancy Palmer Edwards (2)	(United Kingdom) J. Hill	6-2, 11-9
1926	(United Kingdom) Dorothy Biddle	(United Kingdom) Miss Norman	6-2, 6-4
1927	(United Kingdom) Mary Cambridge	(United Kingdom) L.K. Bond	6-4, 6-1
1928	(United Kingdom) Nancy Palmer Edwards (3)	(United Kingdom) Mrs P. Carthew	6-2, 7-5
1929	(United Kingdom) Nancy Palmer Edwards (4)	(United Kingdom) Betty Boas	6-1, 6-2
1930	(United Kingdom) Helen Eddis	(United Kingdom) Miss Wentworth-Reeve	5-7, 6-2, 7-5
1931	(United Kingdom) Kay Stammers	(United Kingdom) Margaret Stocks	6-3, 6-1
1932	(United Kingdom) Dorothy Biddle de Winton (2)	(United Kingdom) I.M. Boothroyd	6-1, 6-1
1933	(United Kingdom) Dorothy Biddle de Winton (3)	(United Kingdom) D. Finnigan	7-5, 6-1
1934	(United Kingdom) D. Finnigan	(United Kingdom) Betty Boas	7-5, 5-7, 6-2
1935	(United Kingdom) Mrs P. Carthew	(United Kingdom) D. Finnigan	6-4, 6-3
1936	(United Kingdom) Audrey Wright	(United Kingdom) E. Worrall	6-3, 6-4
1937	(United Kingdom) Freda Scott Underwood	(United Kingdom) E. Worrall	6-2, 6-3
1938	(United Kingdom) Nancy Palmer (5)	(United Kingdom) Mrs P. Carthew	3-6, 6-4, 6-4
