= 1890 Wimbledon Championships – Women's singles =

Women's singles
- 1890 Wimbledon Championships

Final
- Champion: (Republic of Ireland) Lena Rice
- Runner-up: (United Kingdom) May Jacks
- Score: 6–4, 6–1

Details
- Draw: 4
- Seeds: –

Events
Singles	men	women
Doubles	men	women
← 1889 ·	Wimbledon Championships	· 1891 →

Lena Rice defeated May Jacks 6–4, 6–1 in the all comers' final to win the ladies' singles tennis title at the 1890 Wimbledon Championships. The reigning champion Blanche Hillyard did not defend her title. Despite previous draws there were only four competitors in the tournament, the smallest entry ever for any competition at Wimbledon.

== Draw ==
=== Key ===
- Q = Qualifier
- WC = Wild card
- LL = Lucky loser
- Alt = Alternate
- SE = Special exempt
- PR = Protected ranking
- ITF = ITF entry
- JE = Junior exempt
- w/o = Walkover
- r = Retired
- d = Defaulted
- SR = Special ranking

=== All Comers' ===
Semifinals
(United Kingdom) May Jacks	6	7
(United Kingdom) Edith Cole	4	5
(United Kingdom) Lena Rice	7	6
(United Kingdom) Mary Steedman	5	2

Final
(United Kingdom) Lena Rice	6	6
(United Kingdom) May Jacks	4	1

Preceded by 1889 U.S. National Championships – Women's singles	Grand Slam women's singles	Succeeded by 1890 U.S. National Championships – Women's singles
