= 1890 Wimbledon Championships =

- Date: 30 June – 7 July (singles); 21–23 July (doubles)
- Edition: 14th
- Category: Grand Slam
- Surface: Grass
- Location: Worple Road; SW19, Wimbledon, London, United Kingdom
- Venue: All England Lawn Tennis Club

Champions

Men's singles
- (United Kingdom) Willoughby Hamilton

Women's singles
- (United Kingdom) Lena Rice

Men's doubles
- (United Kingdom) Joshua Pim / (United Kingdom) Frank Stoker
- Wimbledon Championships

The 1890 Wimbledon Championships was a combined men's and women's tennis tournament that took place on the outdoor grass courts at the All England Lawn Tennis Club in Wimbledon, London, United Kingdom. That year Ireland's Lena Rice from Tipperary won the women's singles and Ireland's William Willoughby from County Kildare won the men's singles. The men's doubles was won by Irish duo Joshua Pim from Wicklow and Frank Stoker from Dublin. The tournament ran from 30 June until 7 July. It was the 14th staging of the Wimbledon Championships, and the first Grand Slam tennis event of 1890. Bonham Carter Evelegh took over as referee from Julian Marshall. The rule for change-overs was altered to after every odd game. There were 30 competitors for the men's singles and only four competitors for the women's singles, the smallest entry ever for any competition at Wimbledon. The final of the women's singles competition, which started on 2 July, was played on 5 July, while the men's singles final was played on 7 July and the men's doubles were played on 21–23 July.

== Finals ==
=== Men's singles ===
(United Kingdom) Willoughby Hamilton defeated (United Kingdom) William Renshaw, 6–8, 6–2, 3–6, 6–1, 6–1.

=== Women's singles ===
(United Kingdom) Lena Rice defeated (United Kingdom) May Jacks, 6–4, 6–1.

=== Men's doubles ===
(United Kingdom) Joshua Pim / (United Kingdom) Frank Stoker defeated (United Kingdom) George Hillyard / (United Kingdom) Ernest Lewis, 6–0, 7–5, 6–4.

| Preceded by 1889 U.S. National Championships | Grand Slams | Succeeded by 1890 U.S. National Championships |
