= Lena Rice =

Irish tennis player (1866–1907)

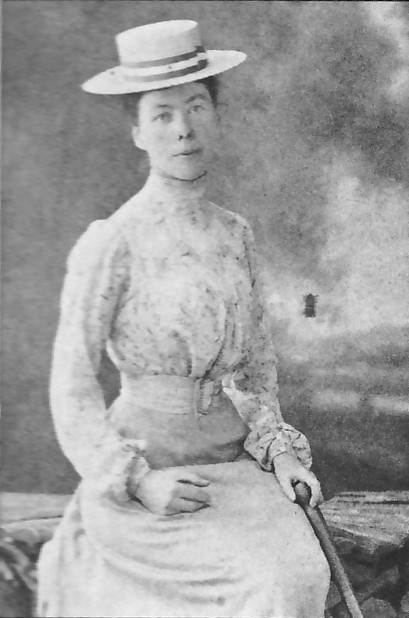
- Full name: Helena Bertha Grace Rice
- Country (sports): United Kingdom
- Born: 21 June 1866; Marlhill, New Inn, County Tipperary, Ireland
- Died: 21 June 1907 (aged 41); Marlhill

Singles

Grand Slam singles results
- Wimbledon: F (1889); W (1890)

Helena Bertha Grace Rice (21 June 1866 – 21 June 1907) was an Irish tennis player who won the singles title at the 1890 Wimbledon Championships. She is the only female player from Ireland ever to win a singles title at Wimbledon.

== Biography ==
Lena Rice was born the second-youngest of eight children of Spring Rice and Anna Gorde in 1866. Her Church of Ireland family, related to the Monteagles of Limerick, lived in a two-storey Georgian building at Marlhill, half a mile from New Inn, County Tipperary. When her father died in 1868, her mother struggled to manage the household. Lena learned to play tennis with her sister Anne in their large garden at Marlhill and both girls entered the Cahir Lawn Tennis club, often playing against British Army officers.

Rice's first tournament outside Tipperary was the Irish Championships at Dublin in May 1889. There she lost in straight sets to Blanche Bingley Hillyard in the semi-final. In doubles competition, she reached the final partnering Hillyard, and in mixed doubles she won the title along with Willoughby Hamilton.

Later that year, Rice played at the Wimbledon Championships. She reached the final where she met Hillyard once again. She won the first set 6–4 and had three match points at 5–3, 40–15 and advantage in the second, but Hillyard managed to come back and eventually won in three sets.

The next year, only four players participated at the singles event at Wimbledon. After winning over Mary Steedman in two sets in the first round, Rice's opponent in the allcomers' final was May Jacks. Rice won in two sets to lift the 50-guineas challenger trophy and a cash prize of 20 guineas.

Rice possessed a strong serve and a powerful forehand. She is credited with inventing the Forearm smash, employing it in her match-winning point against Jacks in the 1890 final.

After her 1890 Wimbledon title, there is no record of Rice playing tennis at a tournament. She did not defend her Wimbledon title in the challenge round the following year. As her mother died in 1891, it seems likely that family ill health prevented her from continuing her tennis career.

Rice, who never married, died of tuberculosis on her 41st birthday in 1907. She was buried at the New Inn cemetery, close to her parents, her brother Samuel and their father's sister Agnes.

== Grand Slam finals ==
=== Singles (1 title) ===
| Result | Year | Championship | Surface | Opponent | Score |
|---|---|---|---|---|---|
| F | 1889 | Wimbledon | Grass | (United Kingdom) Blanche Bingley Hillyard | 6–4, 6–8, 4–6 |
| W | 1890 | Wimbledon | Grass | (United Kingdom) May Jacks | 6–4, 6–1 |
