= Nebraska State Championships =

Defunct tennis tournament
- Tour: USLTA Circuit (1890–22); ILTF World Circuit (1923–72)
- Founded: 1890; 135 years ago
- Abolished: 1972; 53 years ago
- Location: Hastings; Kearney; Lincoln; Omaha
- Venue: Various
- Surface: Grass / outdoor

The Nebraska State Championships or simply the Nebraska Championships was a men's and women's open tennis tournament founded in 1890 as the Championship of Nebraska. Also known as the Nebraska State Open Championships. The tournament was first played at the Kearney, Nebraska, United States. It was played annually till 1972.

== History ==
In June 1890 the Nebraska Championships was established the winners of the inaugural singles events were W.E. Davidson (men) and Miss Doolittle (women). The tournaments was held in various locations throughout its run such as Hastings, Kearney, Lincoln and Omaha. The tournament was staged annually as part of the ILTF World Circuit until at least 1972 when it was downgraded from the senior world tour and became part of the national USTA Circuit.
