= Fitzwilliam Lawn Tennis Club =

Tennis club in Dublin, Ireland

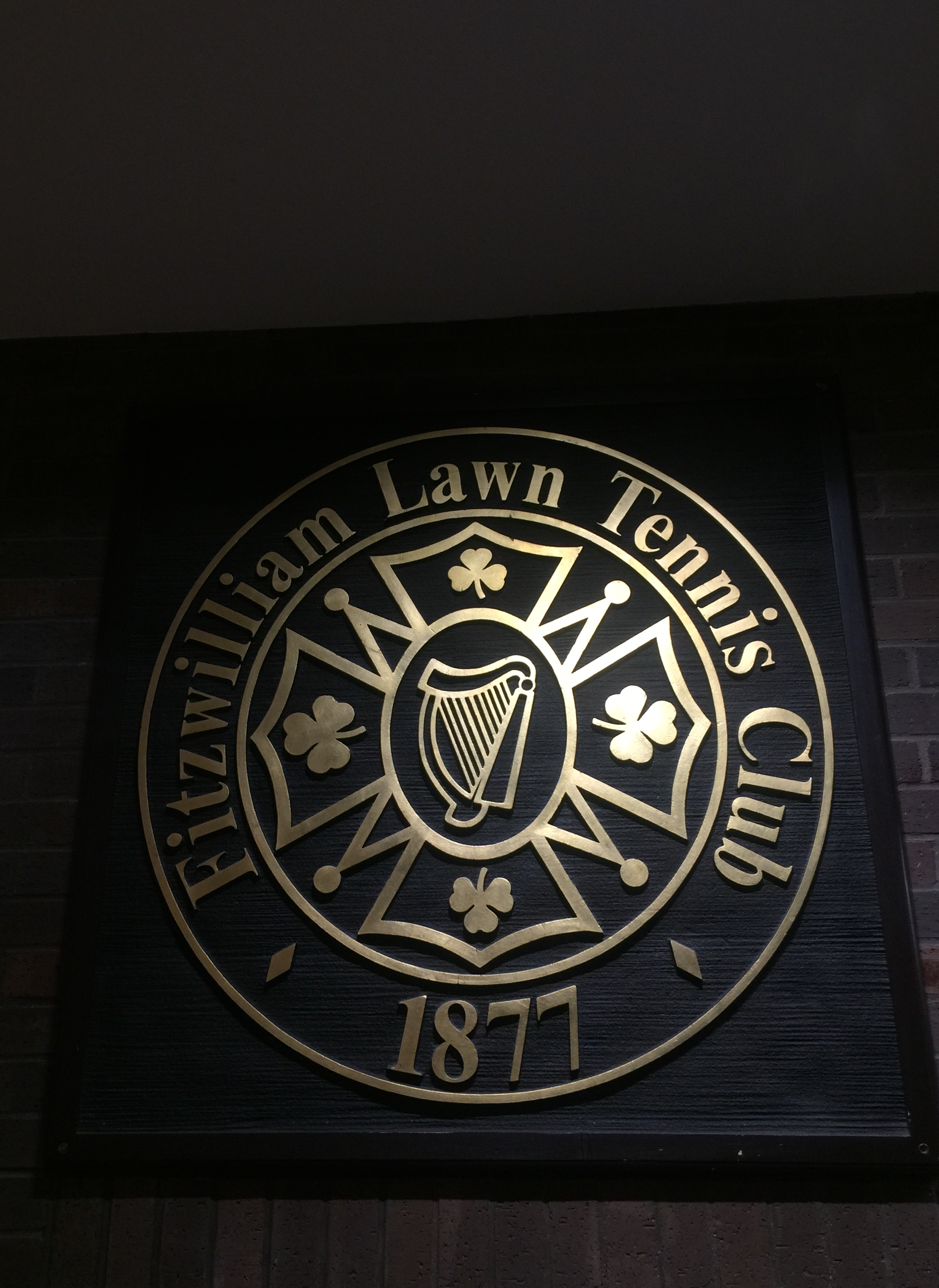
- Formation: 1877
- Type: Private Members Club
- Location: Appian Way, Dublin 6, Ireland
- Coordinates: 53°19′40″N 06°14′56″W
- Region served: Dublin
- Official language: English
- Website: Official website

Fitzwilliam Lawn Tennis Club is a tennis and squash club in Dublin, Ireland, with a gymnasium, padel courts, clubhouse facilities (including dining) and an indoor swimming pool. Established in 1877, Fitzwilliam is one of the oldest tennis clubs in the world.

== Fitzwilliam's Early Years ==
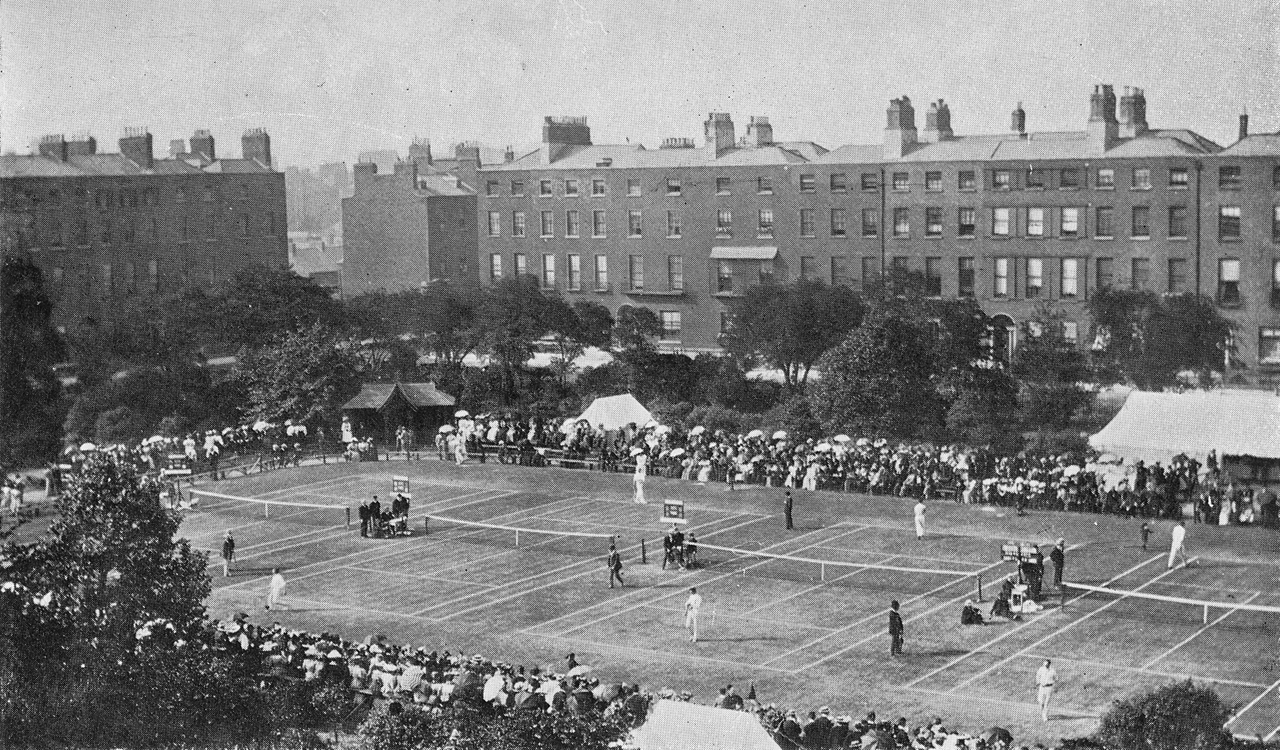
Irish Tennis Championships in Fitzwilliam Square.

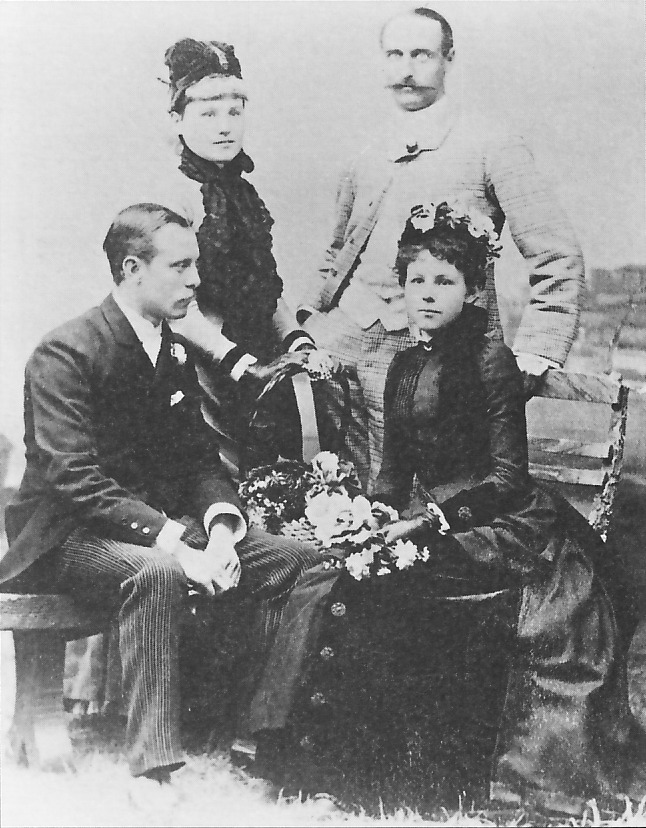
Photograph of competitors at Fitzwilliam tennis club in 1884.

In November 1877, soon after tennis was invented, the Club was founded by ten men and it leased grounds in Upper Pembroke Street, near to Fitzwilliam Square. Initially it was called the Dublin Lawn Tennis Club, but later in 1877 the name was changed to Fitzwilliam Lawn Tennis Club.

In 1879 Fitzwilliam Lawn Tennis Club staged the first Irish Lawn Tennis Championships at nearby Fitzwilliam Square, which remained the host location for that event until 1903, when the Championships moved to Wilton Place. Significantly, the year 1879 also saw the hosting by Fitzwilliam of the world's first National Ladies' Tennis Championship, an event which was marked in 2023 by the installation at 24/25 Upper Pembroke Street of a Dublin City Council commemorative plaque. The ladies' event was held there rather than at Fitzwilliam Square in order, it was reported in The Field magazine, "to keep the matches as private as possible". The first Ladies' champion was May Langrishe from County Kilkenny.

In 1880 the club acquired a house and gardens at Wilton Place on which tennis courts were constructed. The original house named Wilton House was converted to serve as the new clubhouse. By 1885, the club needed to expand further and two acres next to the pavilion were acquired and additional tennis courts (with a grass surface) were laid down. In 1902 the club decided to build a pavilion directly on the club grounds, allowing the lease on the adjoining building to be surrendered.

In 1912, a squash court was constructed on the club grounds at Wilton Place. This was, at the time, one of very few squash courts in the country. This was replaced in the late 1930s by a court on the opposite side of the pavilion and, in the 1960s, two squash courts and a small gallery were built on the site of the original court. The squash facilities were further expanded in 1972 as part of the new Appian Way complex.

== The Move to Appian Way ==
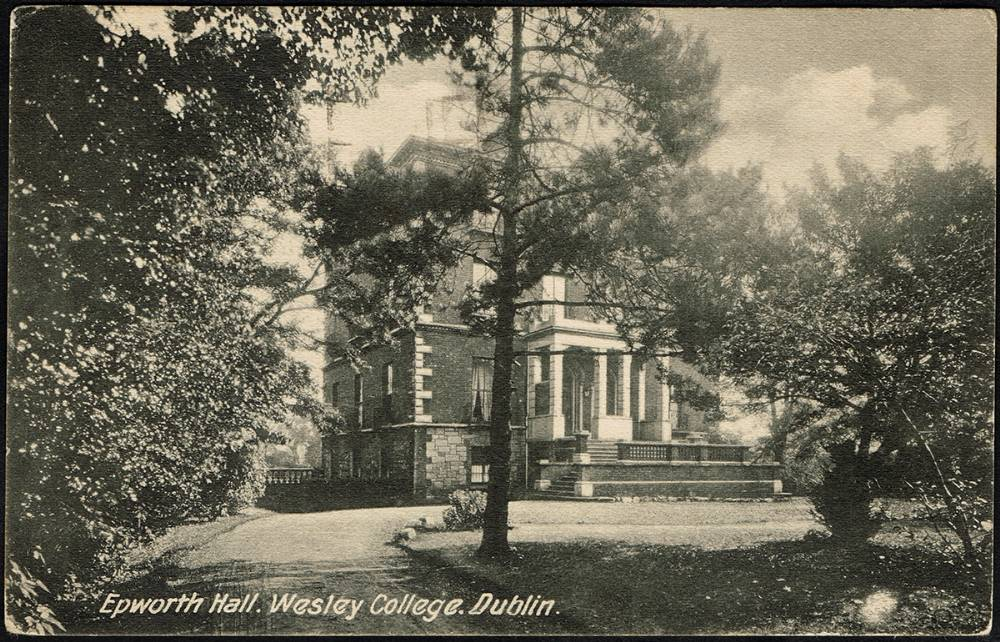
Epworth Hall, Appian Way, Dublin 2, the site of the modern day tennis club since 1969.

In 1969 the members of Fitzwilliam Lawn Tennis Club approved an offer to surrender its Wilton Place premises in exchange for a purpose-built complex on a much larger site at the corner of Winton Road and Appian Way, less than 2 km away replacing a house and gardens by the name of Epworth Hall which was owned by Wesley College. At least four other Victorian houses were also demolished in the process. The deal was arranged by a consortium which included Ken O'Reilly Hyland, Sam Stephenson, Arthur Gibney and New Ireland Assurance.

The move took place in December 1972, and involved building a new clubhouse with significantly enhanced facilities designed by Sam Stephenson. Currently the club has six floodlit outdoor tennis courts and four indoor tennis courts; it also has six squash courts, one of which is an exhibition court with seating for 150 spectators; it has three outdoor padel courts; and it has a specialised shop for racquets, clothing and a re-stringing service.

== The Lawn Tennis Championships of Ireland / Irish Open Tennis Championships ==
Prior to the creation of the International Lawn Tennis Federation and the establishment of its world championship events in 1913, the Irish Championships at Fitzwilliam were considered by players and historians as one of the four most important tennis tournaments to win, the others being the Wimbledon Championships, the Northern Championships and the U.S. National Championships.

The men's event was part of the pre-open era tour from inception until 1967 with winners including Grand Slam singles champions, Neale Fraser (1958), Rod Laver (1962) and Tony Roche (1965, 1970). It was then part of the open era non-aligned independent tour (1968–69). From 1970 to 1974, it was an event on the Grand Prix tennis circuit. The women's event was on the same tours as the men except for when it became part of the Women's Tennis Association (WTA) Tour from 1971 to 1973, the first year that these championships were played at Appian Way. Notable Ladies' Irish singles champions include Helen Wills Moody (1938), Alice Marble (1939), Maureen Connolly (1952), Billie Jean King (1963, 1969), Maria Bueno (1964-65), Margaret Court (1966, 1971, 1973), Virginia Wade (1970) and Evonne Goolagong (1972). The men's edition was played until 1979, and the women's ended in 1983 when they both ceased to part of the top-level world tennis circuit.

The Irish Open, under the auspices of Tennis Ireland, is currently a tournament on the ITF World Tennis Tour with Fitzwilliam sharing its hosting with a small number of other clubs.

== Junior Lawn Tennis Championships Of Ireland ==
The promotion of Junior tennis has always been important for Fitzwilliam Lawn Tennis Club. The club hosted the first Junior Championships of Ireland for boys in 1912 and for girls in 1923. A Centenary celebration in 2014 was attended by a very large number of former competitors and guests from around the world, to celebrate what has become known as 'Junior Fitz'. These Championships are the most significant event on the Irish Junior circuit and the winners are recognised as the Irish Junior Champions. Probably uniquely in world tennis, Fitzwilliam Lawn Tennis Club has hosted this prestigious event continuously since its inception.

== Fitzwilliam and Wimbledon ==
Fitzwilliam members had considerable success in the early years of the Championships at Wimbledon. Willoughby Hamilton and Harold Mahony were singles champions in 1890 and 1896 respectively. J. Cecil Parke was Mixed Doubles champion (with Ethel Larcombe, GBR) in 1914 and runner-up the previous year.

Fitzwilliam enjoys strong and longstanding ties with the All England Lawn Tennis and Croquet Club (AELTC). Annual tennis matches between Fitzwilliam's Men's teams (since 1946) and Ladies' teams (since 2022) for the Sterry Cup and the Mary French Cup, respectively, are keenly contested. A Fitzwilliam team was invited to AELTC to celebrate its 150th anniversary in 2018.

== Fitzwilliam and the Davis Cup ==
Fitzwilliam hosted Ireland's first ever Davis Cup ties in 1923 against India (3-2) and France (1-4) and has been by far the most frequent venue for Ireland's home ties since that time.

Fitzwilliam member, Harold S. Mahony, was a non-playing member of the British Isles team that defeated the United States in the third staging of the Davis Cup in 1903. Another Fitzwilliam member, J. Cecil Parke, was a member of the British Isles team that won the Davis Cup in 1912, winning both of his singles matches against Australasia in the Challenge Round, played in Melbourne.

== The Association of Centenary Tennis Clubs / Reciprocal Clubs ==
In 2005, Fitzwilliam Lawn Tennis Club joined the Association of Centenary Tennis Clubs (CTC), an umbrella group of tennis clubs more than 100 years old. The association has a worldwide membership and is recognised by The International Tennis Federation (ITF). In addition, Fitzwilliam has reciprocal arrangements with 34 clubs throughout the world.

== Women As Members Of Fitzwilliam Lawn Tennis Club ==
From its foundation in 1877, membership of Fitzwilliam Lawn Tennis Club was restricted to men. This changed in 1996 when members voted by a large majority to rescind the rule excluding women as members. The first women to become members were former top-ranked Irish tennis/squash players Geraldine Barniville, Heather Flinn and Mary Fitzgibbon who were elected as Honorary Life members. In 2016, Helen Shields was the first woman to be elected President of the club. By 2024, women comprised a significant proportion of the club's more than 2,000 members.

== Fitzwilliam and Squash ==
In 1936 The Irish Squash Racquets Association was founded with Fitzwilliam member Judge Cahir Davitt as President. Fitzwilliam initiated and hosted the first Irish Squash Racquets Open for men (1932) and women (1949) and many of the world's best players have subsequently competed, notably Jonah Barrington (Eng), Geoff Hunt (Aus), Peter Nicol (Sco), Jonathon Power (Can), Lisa Opie (Eng), Susan Devoy (NZ), Vanessa Atkinson (NED) and Madeline Perry (IRL). In order to improve the standard in Irish Squash, which was little played in Irish schools, Fitzwilliam started the Irish Boys' and Girls' Squash Racquets Championships in 1974. A number of squash exhibition matches have been organized by Fitzwilliam, including a series of matches between Jonah Barrington (the world's leading professional) and Geoff Hunt (world amateur champion) took place in 1970. More recently, the top-ranked El Shorbagy brothers, Mohamed and Marwan, have thrilled Fitzwilliam's spectators with their play and provided coaching sessions to the Club's juniors.

As national champions, Fitzwilliam's Women's team has competed in the European Club Squash Championships on seven occasions since 2002, winning the Bronze medal twice, in 2002 and in 2012. Fitzwilliam competes in the Leinster Squash Leagues and has many fixtures against international clubs, including the Jesters (UK) and the UK Veterans. Fitzwilliam member Derek Ryan competed on the professional circuit and was ranked number 7 in the world in 1999.

== Interclub Fixtures ==
From its foundation, Fitzwilliam encouraged fixtures against other clubs. Arising from this, Fitzwilliam and some other clubs established a league for tennis clubs in the Dublin area in 1903 and which continues today. It is one of the largest tennis leagues with nearly 70 clubs participating.

Fitzwilliam also competes internationally (including Juniors) against many clubs including AELTC, Queen's Club (London) and other member clubs of the Association of Centenary Tennis Clubs including RCT Barcelona-1899, Kunglia LTK (Stockholm) and I.Cesky (Prague).

== Current tournaments ==
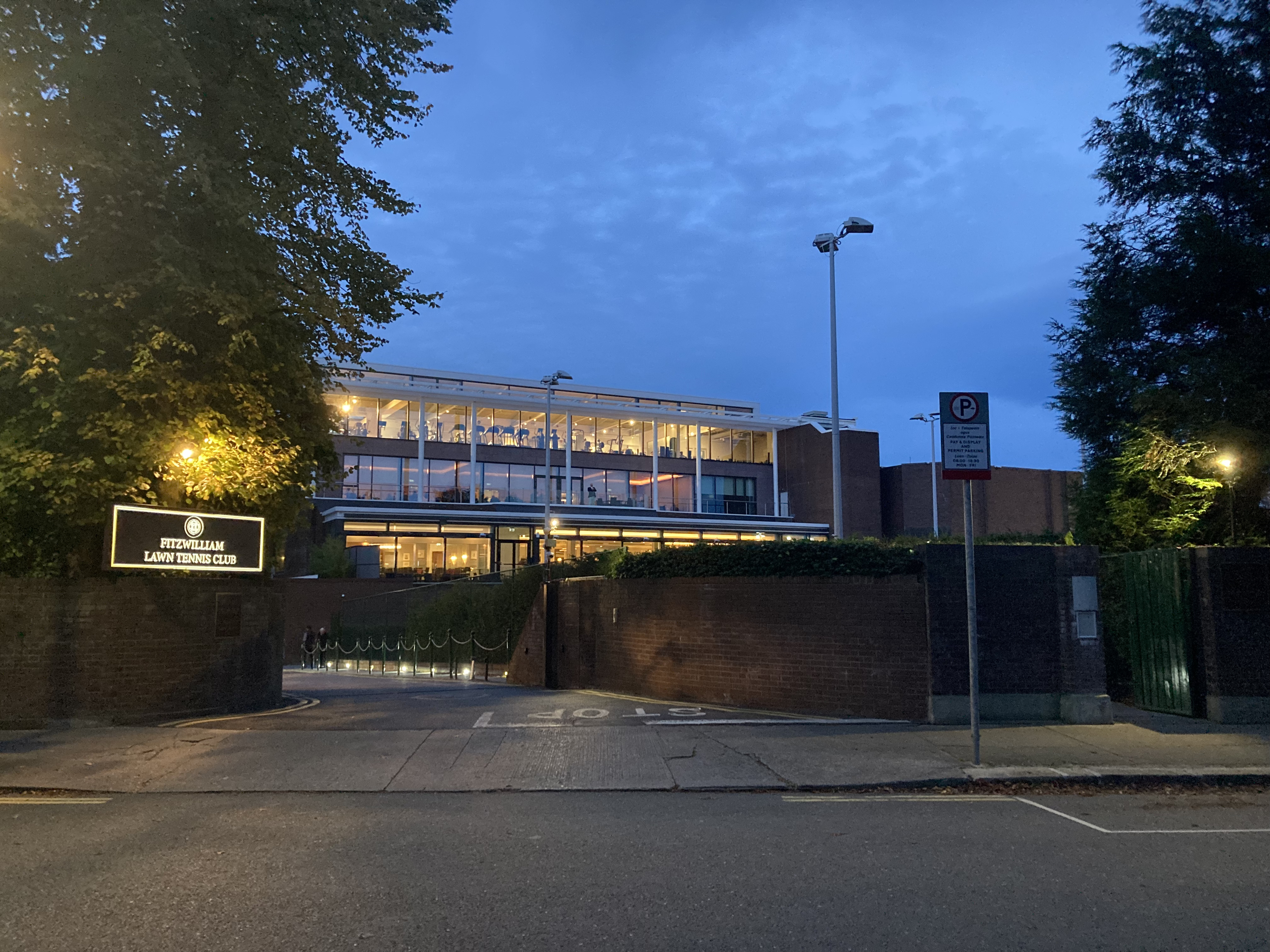
Fitzwilliam Lawn Tennis Club entrance in 2023.

- AIG Irish Open Championships (2017–present).

== Former tournaments ==
The Fitzwilliam Lawn Tennis Club has organised many notable tournaments throughout the years.

- Fitzwilliam Club Championships
- Fitzwilliam Plate
- Fitzwilliam Purse
- Irish Hard Court Championships
- Irish Lawn Tennis Championships
- Irish Open
- Shelbourne Irish Open
