= Grainger Chaytor =

Irish tennis player (1868–1913)

- Full name: David Grainger Chaytor
- Country (sports): Ireland
- Born: 11 May 1868 Killiney, County Dublin, Ireland
- Died: 13 July 1913 (aged 45) Dublin, Ireland
- Turned pro: 1885 (amateur tour)
- Retired: 1900

Singles
- Career record: 222/47 (78.8%)
- Career titles: 21

Grand Slam singles results
- Wimbledon: QF (1890)

David Grainger Chaytor KC. (11 May 1868 – 13 July 1913) was an Irish tennis player and later lawyer. In major tournaments of the time he was a singles quarter finalist at the 1890 Wimbledon Championships, a three time quarter finalist at the Irish Championships, and finalist at the 1887 Northern Championships. Between 1885 and 1900 he won 21 career titles.

== Career ==
Grainger Chaytor was born on 11 May 1868 in Killiney, County Dublin in Ireland. He was one of three of his brothers who also played tennis, including the 1894 Wimbledon semi finalist Tom Chaytor. He played his first tournament at the 1885 East of Ireland Championships, at the Howth Lawn Tennis Club in the coastal suburb of Howth in Dublin where he lost in the first round to Robert Hassard. In 1886 he won his first title the Fitzwilliam Plate at the Fitzwilliam Lawn Tennis Club against Francis Perry.

In major tennis tournaments of the time he was a singles quarter finalist at the 1890 Wimbledon Championships, a three time quarter finalist at the Irish Championships, and finalist at the 1887 Northern Championships.

His other career singles highlights include winning the Derbyshire Championships at Buxton four times (1892–1894, 1899), the Sussex Championships three times (1891, 1895, 1898) at Brighton, the Yorkshire Championships three times (1895, 1898, 1900). In addition to winning one title including the Fitzwilliam Plate (1886), Kilkenny County and City Open (1887), the King's County and Ormonde Tournament (1887), Staffordshire County Lawn Tennis Championships (1890), the Dublin University Championships (1890) Queens Challenge Cup (1890), the Nottinghamshire Championships (1890), the East of Scotland Championships (1891), the Fitzwilliam Club Championships (1891) and the Darlington Association Tournament (1892).

He was also a finalist at the Killiney and Ballybrack Championships (1886), the Fitzwilliam Club Championships (1887), the Waterford Annual Lawn Tennis Tournament (1887), the County Dublin Championships (1889), North of Ireland Championships (1889), North of England Championships (1892), the Welsh Covered Court Championships (1899). In 1900 Grainger played his final tournament at the North of England Championships at Scarborough. Between 1885 and 1900 he won 21 career titles.

== Personal ==
Grainger Chaytor, as he was known, was one of six siblings and three lawn tennis-playing Chaytor brothers including Wimbledon semi finalist Tom Chaytor from the suburb of Killiney, County Dublin, Ireland. They were the children of Charles Henry George Chaytor and Mary Anne Chaytor (nee. Grainger) from whom the lawn tennis player took his middle name. He married Mary Elizabeth (Gambell) Chaytor in October 1892 in Callan, Ireland.

Grainger Chaytor studied law and was later appointed King’s Counsel, he died on 13 July 1913.
