= May Jacks =

British tennis player

- Country (sports): GBR
- Born: England
- Turned pro: 1884 (amateur)
- Retired: 1891

Singles
- Career titles: 8

Grand Slam singles results
- Wimbledon: F (1890)

May Jacks was a British tennis player at the end of the nineteenth century. In 1890 she was the losing finalist in the Wimbledon Ladies Singles Championship, being defeated by Lena Rice, and won the British Covered Court Championships the same year. She was active from 1886 to 1891 and contested 18 career singles finals, and won 8 titles.

== Career ==
In 1886 she played at the Middlesex Championships where she reached the final before losing to a Miss. Douglas. In 1887 she played at the Essex Championships where she reached the final where she lost in straight sets to Brenda James. Her other career singles highlights include winning the Kent Championships in 1888 and 1890. In 1889 she won the London Championships when it was held at the London Athletic Club in Fulham. The same year she was a finalist at the South of England Championships where she lost to May Langrishe.

At the 1890 Wimbledon Championships only four competitors entered, the smallest entry ever for any competition at Wimbledon. Under the system at that time, Rice should then have played the defending champion, Blanche Bingley, in the All Comers Final, but Bingley did not enter, so Rice had a walkover. May reached the final but was defeated by Lena Rice in straight sets.

In 1890 Jacks retained the title at the inaugural London Championships when it had moved to the Queen's Club, beating Maud Shackle 6–2, 6–1. The following year she lost to Shackle 6–2, 4–6, 6–3. Also in 1890 she won the inaugural British Covered Court Championships.
