= 1890 men's tennis season =

1890 Men's Tennis Season
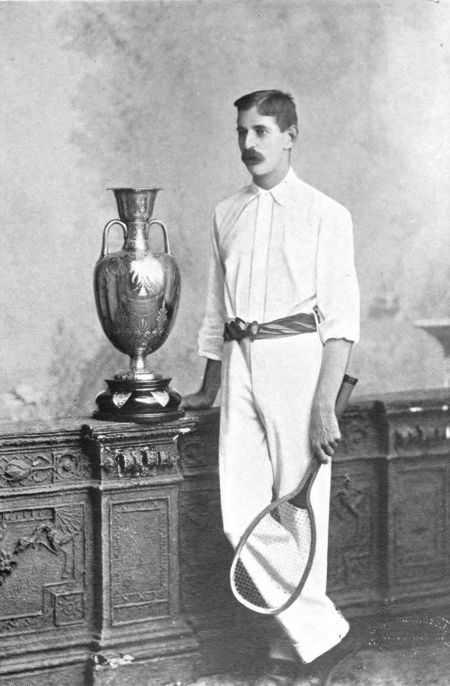
- Irelands Joshua Pim won 1 major title the Northern Championships and is joint title leader this season with England's Ernest Wool Lewis

Details
- Duration: 3 January – 18 November
- Edition: 15th
- Tournaments: 142
- Categories: Major (5); Pro (1); National (10); Britain & Ireland (76); United States (30); Australasia (7); Canada (4); Europe (5); India & Ceylon (4); South Africa (1)

Achievements (singles)
- Most titles: (Ireland) Joshua Pim (6) (United Kingdom) Ernest Lewis (6)
- Most finals: (United Kingdom) Ernest Lewis (8)

The 1890 Men's Tennis Season was a world wide tennis tournament circuit consisting of 142 major, national, professional, regional, provincial, state, county, city and regular tournaments.

The season began in January in Christchurch in New Zealand and ended in November in Melbourne in Australia.

== Season summary ==
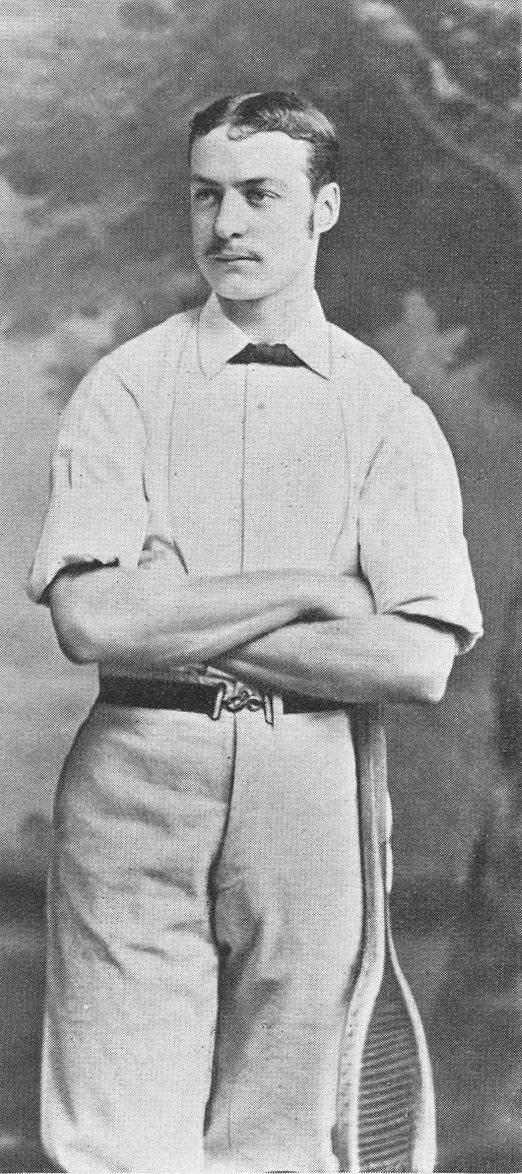
England's Ernest Wool Lewis won one major title at the Irish Championships and was the joint 1890 season title leader with 6 events won, and he reached the most finals with 8 in total.

The 1890 season began in early January in Christchurch, New Zealand, with the New Zealand Championships that was won by Joy Marshall.

At the end of May at the staging of the first major tournament of the season the Irish Lawn Tennis Championships held at the Fitzwilliam LTC, the mens singles event is won by England's Ernest Wool Lewis who defeated Ireland's Willoughby Hamilton in five sets.

At the beginning of June the second World Professional Championships are held in Dublin, Ireland, that is won by George J. Kerr who defeats Tom Pettitt by three matches to zero.

In mid June the second amateur major is held the Northern Championships played in Liverpool, England that is won by Ireland's Joshua Pim who beats compatriot Willoughby Hamilton in five sets, who was playing in his second consecutive major final.

In the first week of July at the third amateur major tournament of the year the Wimbledon Championships the mens singles title goes to Irish player Willoughby Hamilton in his third consecutive major appearance, he ousted the English seven time defending champion William Renshaw in five sets.

At the final amateur major of the season the U.S. National Championships played at Newport Casino, Newport, RI in the United States on 3 September, the mens singles is won by Oliver Campbell who beats Henry Slocum in a four set final.

The season ends in mid November in Melbourne, Australia at the Victorian Championships and won by James Cramond.

== Season results ==
Included:
Key

Major events
National events
Professional events

=== January ===
| Ended | Tournament | Winner | Finalist | Semifinalist | Quarterfinalist |
|---|---|---|---|---|---|
| 3 Jan. | New Zealand Championships; Christchurch, New Zealand; Grass | (New Zealand) Joy Marshall; 6–3, 6–4, 10–8 | (New Zealand) Minden Fenwick | | |
| 18 Jan. | Southern India Championships; Madras, India; Clay | (United Kingdom) Harry Grove; 10–12, 6–1, 6–1 | (United Kingdom) Charles Lacy Sweet | | |

=== February ===
No events

=== March ===
| Ended | Tournament | Winner | Finalist | Semifinalist | Quarterfinalist |
|---|---|---|---|---|---|
| 8 Mar. | Bombay Gymkhana Club Open; Bombay, India; Grass | (United Kingdom) Eustace Nicholson def. | (United Kingdom) Arthur Barton | | |
| 15 Mar. | Bengal Championships; Calcutta, India; Surface | (United Kingdom) Reginald Gamble def. | (United Kingdom) E. Pearce | | |
| 15 Mar. | London Covered Court Championships; West Kensington II, Great Britain; Wood (i) | (United Kingdom) Harry S. Barlow; 2–6, 4–6, 6–0, 6–4, 6–3 | (United Kingdom) Ernest Meers | | |
| 15 Mar. | Punjab Championships; Lahore, India; Grass | (United Kingdom) Henry Fleming def. | (United Kingdom) R. F. Anderson | | |
| 20 Mar. | Tropical Championships; St Augustine, United States; Asphalt | (United States) Oliver Campbell; 6–4, 5–7, 6–2, 6–4 | (United States) Thomas Beckworth | | |
| 22 Mar. | British Covered Court Championships; Bayswater, Great Britain; Wood (i) | (United Kingdom) Ernest Lewis; 6–2, 6–3, 6–2 | (United Kingdom) Ernest Meers | | |
| 28 Mar. | Auckland Championships; Auckland, New Zealand; Asphalt | (New Zealand) William Goodhue; 6–4, 5–7, 6–2, 6–4 | (New Zealand) Eric Hudson | | |

=== April ===
| Ended | Tournament | Winner | Finalist | Semifinalist | Quarterfinalist |
|---|---|---|---|---|---|
| 9 Apr. | Geelong Easter Tournament; Geelong, Australia; Asphalt | (Australia) William Goodhue (2); 6–4, 5–7, 6–2, 6–4 | (Australia) Eric Hidson | | |
| 12 Apr. | South Australian Championships; Adelaide, Australia; Asphalt | (Australia) Bert Hambidge; 13–10 games | (Australia) John Baker | | |
| 13 Apr. | Ceylon Championships; Nuwara Eliya, Ceylon; Clay | (United Kingdom) James Dove; 6–3, 5–7, 6–2, 6–3 | (United Kingdom) Hugh Keith | | |
| 24 Apr. | Fitzwilliam Club Championships; Dublin II, Ireland; Grass | (Ireland) Willoughby Hamilton; 6–2, 6–3, 6–4 | (Ireland) Grainger Chaytor | | |
| 24 Apr. | Buckley Trophy; Melbourne II, Australia; Grass | (Australia) Walter Riddell; 2–6, 8–6, 6–4 | (Australia) Norman Bayles | | |

=== May ===
| Ended | Tournament | Winner | Finalist | Semifinalist | Quarterfinalist |
|---|---|---|---|---|---|
| 7 May. | Dublin University Championships; Dublin III, Ireland; Asphalt | (Ireland) Grainger Chaytor; 6–3, 3–6, 8–6, 6–1 | (Ireland) Harold Mahony | | |
| 11 May. | Danish National Championships; Copenhagen, Denmark; Clay | (Denmark) Folmer Hansen won | (Denmark) ? | | |
| 24 May. | Pollokshields Open; Pollokshields II, Great Britain; Grass | (United Kingdom) Edward Fuller; 3–6, 6–2, 6–0, 3–6, 6–0 | (United Kingdom) Henry Guy Nadin | | |
| 25 May. | West of Scotland Championships; Pollokshields, Great Britain; Grass | (Scotland) G. Scott Jackson def. | (Scotland) John B. Gray | | |
| 25 May. | Southern Championships; Baltimore, United States; Clay | (United States) Fred Mansfield def. | (United States) Albert Empie Wright | | |
| 31 May. | Irish Championships; Dublin, Ireland; Grass | (United Kingdom) Ernest Wool Lewis; 3–6, 3–6, 9–7, 6–4, 7–5 | (Ireland) Willoughby Hamilton | | |

=== June ===
| Ended | Tournament | Winner | Finalist | Semifinalist | Quarterfinalist |
|---|---|---|---|---|---|
| 7 Jun. | Waterloo Open; Waterloo, Great Britain; Grass | (United Kingdom) John Redfern Deykin; 6–0, 1–6, 6–2, 6–2 | (United Kingdom) William Wethered | | |
| 7 Jun. | London Championships; London, Great Britain; Grass | (United Kingdom) Harry S. Barlow (2); 3–6, 6–8, 6–1, 6–2, 6–2 | (United Kingdom) Wilfred Baddeley | | |
| 7 Jun. | New York TC Spring Open; New York City, United States; Clay | (United Kingdom) Charles G. Eames; 6–3, 6–2, 6–1 | (United States) Carman Runyon | | |
| 7 Jun. | West of England Championships; Bath, Great Britain; Grass | (United Kingdom) Harry S. Barlow (3); 7–5, 6–3, 6–2 | (United Kingdom) James Baldwin | | |
| 7 Jun. | Whitehouse Open; Edinburgh II, Great Britain; Clay | (Scotland) Archibald Thomson def. | (United Kingdom) Edward Fuller | | |
| 8 Jun. | Surrey Closed County Championship; Richmond, Great Britain; Grass | (United Kingdom) Harry S. Barlow (4); 5–7, 6–3, 7–5, 6–2 | (United Kingdom) Wilfred Baddeley | | |
| 8 Jun. | World Professional Championships; Dublin IV, Ireland; Grass | (Ireland) George J. Kerr; 3–0 matches | (United States) Tom Pettitt | | |
| 12 Jun. | Wissahickon Open; Wissahickon, United States; Grass | (United States) Rodmand Beach; 6–2, 6–2, 6–1 | (United States) Benjamin Allen | | |
| 12 Jun. | Middle States Championships; Rochester, United States; Grass | (United States) Howard Taylor; 5–7, 6–3, 6–3, 6–4 | (United States) Albert Empie Wright | | |
| 14 Jun. | Surrey Championships; Surbiton, Great Britain; Grass | (United Kingdom) Herbert Baddeley walkover | (United Kingdom) Harry S. Barlow | | |
| 14 Jun. | Taylor Challenge Cup; Leeds, Great Britain; Grass | (United Kingdom) David Davy def. | (United Kingdom) Frederick Bradbury | | |
| 14 Jun. | Cheltenham Championships; Cheltenham, Great Britain; Grass | (Ireland) Harold Mahony; 6–4, 1–6, 6–1, 6–4 | (United Kingdom) James Baldwin | | |
| 16 Jun. | Scottish Championships; Edinburgh, Great Britain; Grass | (Ireland) Ernest Browne; 6–3, 3–6, 6–1, 6–4 | (United Kingdom) George Mewburn | | |
| 20 Jun. | New England Championships; New Haven II, United States; Grass | (United States) Bob Huntington; 3–6, 7–5, 3–6, 6–2, 6–1 | (United States) Oliver Campbell | | |
| 21 Jun. | Northern Championships; Liverpool, Great Britain; Grass | (Ireland) Joshua Pim; 2–6, 6–8, 7–5, 7–5, 6–3 | (Ireland) Willoughby Hamilton | | |
| 21 Jun. | Kent Championships; Beckenham, Great Britain; Grass | (United Kingdom) Ernest Meers; 5–7, 8–6, 6–3, 6–3 | (United Kingdom) Harry S. Barlow | | |
| 23 Jun. | Western Pennsylvania Championships; Pittsburgh, United States; Clay | (United States) Samuel Moorhead; 6–0, 5–7, 6–4, 6–2 | (United States) Marshall Christy | | |
| 23 Jun. | North of Ireland Championships; Belfast, Great Britain; Grass | (Ireland) Manliffe Goodbody; 5–7, 6–4, 6–0, 6–2 | (Ireland) Arthur H. G. Ashe | | |
| 25 Jun. | Welsh Championships; Penarth, Great Britain; Grass | (Ireland) Willoughby Hamilton (2); 6–2, 6–3, 6–0 | (United Kingdom) Charles Lacy Sweet | | |
| 28 Jun. | New Jersey State Championships; Montrose, United States; Grass | (United States) Clarence Hobart walkover | (United States) Albert Empie Wright | | |
| 28 Jun. | Edgbaston Open; Edgbaston II, Great Britain; Surface | (United Kingdom) James Baldwin; 6–3, 6–3, 6–0 | (United Kingdom) Alfred Crawley | | |
| 28 Jun. | County Dublin Championships; Dublin IV, Ireland; Grass | (Ireland) Joshua Pim (2); 5–7, 7–5, 6–2, 6–0 | (Ireland) Frank Stoker | | |
| 28 Jun. | Amackassin Club Invitation; Yonkers, United States; Clay | (United States) Victor Etling; 7–5, 4–6, 7–5, 6–4 | (United Kingdom) Charles G. Eames | | |
| 28 Jun. | Midland Counties Championships; Edgbaston, Great Britain; Grass | (United Kingdom) John Redfern Deykin (2); 6–3, 6–3, 4–6, 9–7 | (United Kingdom) Henry Guy Nadin | | |
| 28 Jun. | Northumberland CCC Open; Newcastle II, Great Britain; Grass | (United Kingdom) Roger Hendy; 6–2, 6–2, 6–4 | (New Zealand) Percival Fenwick | | |
| 28 Jun. | Championship of the North of Scotland; Broughty Ferry, Great Britain; Clay | (United Kingdom) James Conyers; 6–2, 5–7, 6–4 | (United Kingdom) Arthur Story | | |
| 30 Jun. | Southern California Championships; Santa Monica, United States; Asphalt | (United States) Robert Peyton Carter; Def. | (United States) Ken Carter | | |

=== July ===
| Ended | Tournament | Winner | Finalist | Semifinalist | Quarterfinalist |
|---|---|---|---|---|---|
| 5 Jul. | Anglo Dutch Open; Rotterdam, Netherlands; Cement | (Netherlands) Raymond Boeye; 6–2, 6–1 | (Netherlands) A. Chabot jr. | | |
| 5 Jul. | Burton-on-Trent Open; Burton-on-Trent, Great Britain; Grass | (United Kingdom) Herbert Chipp; 3–6, 6–3, 6–1, 6–3 | (United Kingdom) G. E. Lowe | | |
| 5 Jul. | Pacific Coast Championships; San Rafael, United States; Asphalt | (United States) William H. Taylor; 6–4, 9–7, 6–0 | (United States) Charles R. Yates | | |
| 7 July. | Wimbledon Championships; Wimbledon, Great Britain; Grass | (Ireland) Willoughby Hamilton (3) score | (United Kingdom) William Renshaw | | |
| 8 Jul. | Waterbury Cup Invitation; Harrison II, United States; Grass | (United States) Howard A. Taylor (2); 6–1, 6–2, 6–2 | (United States) Charles Sands | | |
| 8 Jul | Staffordshire Tournament; Stafford, Great Britain; Grass | (Ireland) Grainger Chaytor (2); 6–0, 6–3, 6–2 | (United Kingdom) John Redfern Deykin | | |
| 12 Jul. | Nottinghamshire LTA Tournament; Nottingham, Great Britain; Grass | (Ireland) Grainger Chaytor (2); 6–2, 6–2 | (United Kingdom) Deane Miller | | |
| 12 Jul. | Yorkshire Association & County Open; Ilkley, Great Britain; Grass | (Ireland) Joshua Pim (3); 6–2, 6–0, 6–0 | (United Kingdom) James Baldwin | | |
| 12 Jul. | Middlesex Championships; Chiswick Park, Great Britain; Grass | (United Kingdom) Ernest Wool Lewis (3); 6–1, 6–4, 6–2 | (Ireland) Harold Mahony | | |
| 12 Jul. | Ilkley Open; Ilkley II, Great Britain; Grass | (United Kingdom) David Davy (2); 7–9, 5–7, 6–0, 6–4, 6–2 | (United Kingdom) William Mahon | | |
| 13 Jul. | Auburndale Challenge Cup; Aburndale, United States; Grass | (United States) Fred Hovey def. | (United States) Silas Reed | | |
| 13 Jul. | Montclair Open; Montclair, United States; Clay | (United States) Edward L. Hall; 6–3, 7–5, 6–4 | (United States) Russell Perkins | | |
| 14 Jul. | Natal Championships; Durban, South Africa; Grass | (Colony of Natal) William J. Grant; 6–4, 6–2, 6–4 | (Colony of Natal) H. Gazzard | | |
| 14 Jul. | Montréal Cup; Montréal, Canada; Clay | (Canada) C. F. Martin; 6–1, 6–2, 6–3 | (Canada) Cecil Yarker | | |
| 14 Jul. | Netherlands National Championships; Scheveningen, Netherlands; Cement | (Netherlands) A. P. van Aken; 6–3, 4–6, 6–3 | (Netherlands) Leendert Boeye | | |
| 15 Jul. | Scottish Border Championships; Hawick, Great Britain; Grass | (United Kingdom) C.B. Martin; 6–1, 6–2, 7–5 | (Scotland) John Glenny | | |
| 16 Jul. | Warwickshire Championships; Leamington Spa, Great Britain; Grass | (United Kingdom) A. E. Passman; 2–6, 6–3, 8–6 | (United Kingdom) Philip Grove | | |
| 16 Jul. | Westchester Invitation; Harrison, United States; Grass | (United States) Bob Huntington (2); 7–9, 4–6, 6–0, 6–4, 6–2 | (United States) Percy Knapp | | |
| 16 Jul. | Leamington Open; Leamington Spa II, Great Britain; Grass | (Ireland) Joshua Pim (4); 6–4, 6–2, 3–6, 9–7 | (United Kingdom) Frank Noon | | |
| 19 Jul. | Queen's Challenge Cup; West Kensington III, Great Britain; Grass | (Ireland) Grainger Chaytor (4); 6–3, 6–1, 6–3 | (United Kingdom) Ernest Wool Lewis | | |
| 19 Jul. | Leicester Open; Leicester, Great Britain; Grass | (Ireland) Joshua Pim (5); 6–1, 6–2 | (United Kingdom) Frank Noon | | |
| 19 Jul. | Royston Open; Royston, Great Britain; Grass | (United Kingdom) C. E. Warren; 6–2, 6–2 | (United Kingdom) Anthony Jackson | | |
| 20 Jul. | Hudson River Championships; Hastings-on-Hudson, United States; Grass | (United States) Valentine Gill Hall; 6–4, 9–7, 6–3 | (United States) Charles Sands | | |
| 20 Jul. | Western States Championships; Chicago, United States; Grass | (United States) Charles A. Chase; 6–3, 2–6, 4–6, 6–1, 6–3 | (United States) John J. McClellan | | |
| 22 Jul. | Market Harborough Tournament; Market Harborough, Great Britain; Grass | (United Kingdom) Frank Noon; 6–4, 6–3, 6–2 | (United Kingdom) Alfred Crawley | | |
| 24 Jul. | Southside Field Club Open; Bay Shore, United States; Clay | (United States) Oliver Campbell (2); 9–7, 6–2, 6–4 | (United States) Bob Huntington | | |
| 26 Jul. | Clones Challenge Cup; Clones, Ireland; Surface | (Ireland) Arthur H G Ashe; 7–5, 6–1, 6–2 | (Ireland) J.S.F. Hearn | | |
| 26 Jul. | Mallow Tournament; Cork, Ireland; Surface | (Ireland) J. O. Head walkover | (United Kingdom) W. H. Clarke | | |
| 26 Jul. | Sheffield & Hallamshire Tournament; Sheffield, Great Britain; Grass | (United Kingdom) Ken Sanderson; 6–4, 3–6, 2–6, 6–2, 7–5 | (United Kingdom) Charles Wade | | |
| 26 Jul. | Hornsey Challenge Cup; Hornsey, Great Britain; Grass | (United Kingdom) J. E. Kingsley; 6–4, 6–3, 6–1 | (United Kingdom) Guy A. Robins | | |
| 26 Jul. | Northwestern Championships; Minnetonka, United States; Concrete | (United States) Charles Sands; 6–5, 7–5, 8–6 | (United States) Juddy Belden | | |
| 28 Jul. | North Wales Championships; Denbigh, Great Britain; Grass | (United Kingdom) Henry Fosbery; 6–2, 6–2, 6–3 | (United Kingdom) George Hayes | | |
| 28 Jul. | Hull Open; Hull, Great Britain; Grass | (United Kingdom) William Mahon; 9–7, 6–3 | (United Kingdom) Geoffrey Hacker | | |
| 30 Jul. | Seaford & Blatchington Open; Seaford, Great Britain; Grass | (United Kingdom) Harold Brooker; 6–1, 6–3 | (United Kingdom) Jim Garrett | | |
| 31 Jul. | Southampton Invitation; Southampton, United States; Grass | (United States) Howard A. Taylor (3); 6–2, 6–2, 6–2 | (United States) Rodmond Beach | | |

=== August ===
| Ended | Tournament | Winner | Finalist | Semifinalist | Quarterfinalist |
|---|---|---|---|---|---|
| 1 Aug. | County Kildare Championship; Naas, Ireland; Grass | (Ireland) C. Johnson; 6–2, 6–4, 6–1 | (Ireland) Richard Hornidge | | |
| 1 Aug. | Somersetshire Championships; Taunton, Great Britain; Grass | (United Kingdom) Arnold Blake; 2–6, 8–6, 6–4, 11–9 | (United Kingdom) Kenneth Marley | | |
| 2 Aug. | Chingford Open; Chingford, Great Britain; Grass | (United Kingdom) Arthur Gore; 3–6, 6–3, 7–5, 4–6, 6–3 | (United Kingdom) Charles G. Eames | | |
| 2 Aug. | Repton Tournament; Repton, Great Britain; Grass | (United Kingdom) G.E. Lowe; 6–3, 6–0 | (United Kingdom) Geoffrey Hacker | | |
| 2 Aug. | Northumberland County Championships; Newcastle, Great Britain; Grass | (Ireland) Manliffe Goodbody (2); 6–3, 6–4, 6–3 | (United Kingdom) Frank Noon | | |
| 6 Aug. | Darlington Association Tournament; Darlington, Great Britain; Grass | (Ireland) Joshua Pim (6); 6–4, 6–4, 1–6, 6–2 | (United Kingdom) Ernest Wool Lewis | | |
| 7 Aug. | Colchester Championship; Colchester II, Great Britain; Grass | (United Kingdom) Herbert Kersey; 2–6, 10–8, 6–2 | (United Kingdom) Maurice Welldon | | |
| 7 Aug. | Kebo Valley Open; Bar Harbor, United States; Grass | (United States) Valentine Gill Hall (2); 6–3, 5–7, 8–6, 6–4 | (United States) Edward L. Hall | | |
| 7 Aug. | Inverkip Rovers Closed Championships; Wemyss Bay, Great Britain; Grass | (United Kingdom) Charles Higginbotham def. | (Scotland) Archibald Thomson | | |
| 8 Aug. | Wentworth Open; New Castle, United States; Grass | (United States) George Lee; 5–7, 6–3, 10–8, 7–5 | (United States) Fred Hovey | | |
| 9 Aug. | Castle Wemyss Cup; Wemyss Bay II, Great Britain; Grass | (Scotland) G. Scott Jackson (2); 6–4, 2–6, 6–4, 7–5 | (United Kingdom) Henry Guy Nadin | | |
| 9 Aug. | Manitoba & Northwest Territories Championships; Winnipeg, Canada; Grass | (Canada) Barney Toole; 8–6, 6–3 | (Canada) Frederick Stobart | | |
| 9 Aug. | Exmouth Open; Exmouth, Great Britain; Grass | (United Kingdom) Ernest Wool Lewis (4); 6–2, 7–5, 2–6, 6–3 | (Ireland) Manliffe Goodbody | | |
| 9 Aug. | Inverkip Rovers Open; Wemyss Bay III, Great Britain; Grass | (Scotland) G. Scott Jackson (3) walkover | (United States) Louis Grant | | |
| 9 Aug. | Waterford Open; Waterford, Ireland; Grass | (Ireland) Arthur H. G. Ashe (2); 6–0, 6–2 | (Ireland) John P. O'Shea | | |
| 15 Aug. | Nahant Invitation; Nahant, United States; Clay | (United States) Oliver Campbell (3); 7–5, 6–2 | (United States) Robert P. Huntington | | |
| 16 Aug. | Hunstanton Open; Hunstanton, Great Britain; Grass | (United Kingdom) William Pechey; 8–6, 6–4, 6–2 | (United Kingdom) H. Dixon | | |
| 16 Aug. | Derbyshire Championships; Buxton, Great Britain; Grass | (Ireland) Manliffe Goodbody (3); 6–2, 7–5, 6–3 | (United Kingdom) Harry S. Barlow | | |
| 16 Aug. | British Columbia Championships; Victoria, Canada; Grass | (Canada) Charles Longe; 4–6, 6–8, 7–5, 6–0, 6–2 | (Canada) Harvey Coombe | | |
| 16 Aug. | Seaton Open; Seaton, Great Britain; Grass | (United Kingdom) Arthur Story; 6–3, 6–4, 5–7, 6–3 | (United Kingdom) G. Porter | | |
| 16 Aug. | South Wales Championships; Tenby, Great Britain; Grass | (Wales) David Davies; 6–4, 5–6, 6–2, 6–0 | (Wales) G. W. Lloyd | | |
| 16 Aug. | Teignmouth & Shaldon Open; Teignmouth, Great Britain; Grass | (United Kingdom) Ernest Wool Lewis (5); 6–1, 6–1 | (United Kingdom) Frank Stoddart | | |
| 16 Aug | Eastern Counties Championships; Felixstowe, Great Britain; Grass | (United Kingdom) Charles Allen; 6–1, 1–6, 6–3 | (United Kingdom) Francis Eicke | | |
| 16 Aug. | Penzance Open; Penzance, Great Britain; Grass | (United Kingdom) Arthur Andrews; 6–2, 8–6 | (United Kingdom) Charles Whiteford | | |
| 19 Aug. | Bar Harbor Open; Bar Harbor II, United States; Grass | (United States) Valentine Gill Hall (3); 6–1, 1–6, 6–0, 1–6, 6–2 | (United States) J. W. Carver | | |
| 19 Aug. | South of Scotland Championships; Moffat, Great Britain; Grass | (Scotland) Alfred Aitken Thomson; 1–6, 6–3, 6–1, 6–2 | (Scotland) Richard Millar Watson | | |
| 21 Aug. | Narragansett Open; Narragansett, United States; Grass | (United States) Oliver Campbell (4); 8–6, 1–6, 6–4, 5–7, 6–3 | (United States) J. W. Carver | | |
| 22 Aug. | St. Ives Open; St. Ives, Great Britain; Grass | (United Kingdom) Charles Whiteford; 6–3, 6–4 | (United Kingdom) Arthur Andrews | | |
| 22 Aug. | Saxmundham Open; Saxmundham, Great Britain; Grass | (United Kingdom) Charles Gladstone Allen (2); 7–5, retd. | (United Kingdom) Roy Allen | | |
| 23 Aug. | Fakenham Open; Fakenham, Great Britain; Grass | (United Kingdom) Frederick Crowdy; 6–2, 6–4 | (United Kingdom) M. R. Gray | | |
| 23 Aug. | Torquay & Shaldon Open; Torquay, Great Britain; Grass | (United Kingdom) Ernest Wool Lewis (6); 6–1, 6–2, 6–3 | (United Kingdom) Edward Avory | | |
| 23 Aug. | North of England Championships; Scarborough, Great Britain; Grass | (United Kingdom) James Baldwin (2); 8–10, 6–1, 6–1, 6–4 | (United Kingdom) Percy Brown | | |
| 23 Aug. | Walmer Open; Walmer, Great Britain; Grass | (United Kingdom) J. R. Mason def.? | (United Kingdom) F. H. Mayo | | |
| 23 Aug. | East of Scotland Championships; St. Andrews, Great Britain; Grass | (Scotland) Richard Millar Watson; 1–6, 2–6, 8–6, 6–2, 6–3 | (United Kingdom) John Conyers | | |
| 24 Aug. | King's County & Ormonde Tournament; Parsons Town, Ireland; Grass | (United Kingdom) Herbert N. Craig | (Ireland) Toler Garvey | | |
| 30 Aug. | Bournemouth Open; Bournemouth, Great Britain; Grass | (United Kingdom) Henry R. Biddle; 6–4, 4–6, 6–2, 6–0 | (United Kingdom) David Payn | | |
| 30 Aug. | Hitchin Open; Hitchin, Great Britain; Grass | (United Kingdom) Charles Gladstone Allen (3) divided title | (United Kingdom) Roy Allen | | |
| 30 Aug. | Colwyn Bay Open; Colwyn Bay, Great Britain; Clay | (United Kingdom) J. U. Hodgson; 6–2, 7–5 | (Scotland) Henry J. Mackenzie | | |

=== September ===
| Ended | Tournament | Winner | Finalist | Semifinalist | Quarterfinalist |
|---|---|---|---|---|---|
| 1 Sep. | Niagara International Championship; Niagara on the Lake, Canada; Grass | (United States) Edward Tanner; 6–4, 6–3, 6–1 | (Canada) Henry Mackenzie | | |
| 3 Sep. | U.S. National Championships Consolation; Newport, RI, II, United States; Grass | (United States) Fred Hovey; 6–0, 6–1 | (United States) Charles Howland | | |
| 3 Sep. | Maplewood Hotel Challenge Cup; Bethlehem, United States; Clay | (United States) Charles Sands (2); 6–1, 6–4, 4–6, 6–3 | (United States) Ernie Gates | | |
| 3 Sep. | Filey Open; Filey, Great Britain; Grass | (United Kingdom) Henry Caldecott; 1–6, 4–6, 6–4, 6–4, 7–5 | (United Kingdom) Arthur Hallward | | |
| 3 Sep. | East Side of the White Mountains Championships; Intervale, United States; Surface | (United States) George A. Hurd; 6–1, 6–1 | (United States) Daniel George | | |
| 3 Sep. | U.S. National Championships; Newport, RI, United States; Surface | (United States) Oliver Campbell (5); 6–2, 4–6, 6–3, 6–1 | (United States) Henry Slocum | | |
| 5 Sep. | Canadian Championships; Toronto, Canada; Grass | (United States) Edward Tanner (2); 6–2, 6–3, 6–3 | (Canada) Oliver R. Macklem | | |
| 5 Sep. | Lenox Invitation; NYC II, United States; Grass | (United States) Philip Sears def. | (United States) Bob Huntington | | |
| 6 Sep. | Sussex Championships; Brighton, Great Britain; Grass | (United Kingdom) Wilfred Baddeley; 6–4, 6–2, 2–6, 7–5 | (United Kingdom) Horace Chapman | | |
| 6 Sep. | Queensland Championships; Brisbane, Australia; Grass | (Australia) Arthur Taylor; 6–3, 6–4, 6–0 | (Australia) Eric Hudson | | |
| 6 Sep. | United Services TC Open; Portsmouth, Great Britain; Grass | (United Kingdom) D. E. Payne divided title | (United Kingdom) L. A. Hamilton | | |
| 7 Sep. | Essex Championships; Colchester, Great Britain; Grass | (United Kingdom) Ernest Meers (2); 6–2, 6–0, 6–2 | (United Kingdom) Edward Christy | | |
| 7 Sep. | Scheveningen International Tournament; Scheveningen, Netherlands; Asphalt | (United Kingdom) E.C. Daubeney; 6–1, 6–3 | (Netherlands) N. A. M. van Aken | | |
| 13 Sep. | South of England Championships; Eastbourne, Great Britain; Grass | (United Kingdom) Andrew Ziffo; 7–9, 6–2, 6–1, 7–5 | (United Kingdom) James Baldwin | | |
| 14 Sep. | Dinard Cup; Dinard, France; Clay | (United Kingdom) Horace Chapman; 3–6, 6–2, 5–7, 7–5, 6–4 | (United Kingdom) Arthur Gore | | |
| 14 Sep. | New Hamburg Invitation; New Hamburg, United States; Grass | (United States) Edward L. Hall; 4–6, 8–6, 6–1, 7–5 | (United States) Alex Post | | |
| 21 Sep. | Boulogne International Championship; Boulogne-sur-Mer, France; Clay | (United Kingdom) Charles Lacy Sweet; 1–6, 6–4, 6–0, 6–0 | (United Kingdom) Wilberforce Eaves | | |

=== October ===
| Ended | Tournament | Winner | Finalist | Semifinalist | Quarterfinalist |
|---|---|---|---|---|---|
| 4 Oct. | New York TC Fall Open; NYC III, United States; Clay | (United States) Arthur Runyon; 2–6, 6–3, 6–2 | (United States) Stephen Millett | | |
| 11 Oct. | Lordship Road Open; Stoke Newington, Great Britain; Clay | (United Kingdom) Edward White walkover | (United Kingdom) E. J. Layton | | |
| 19 Oct. | U.S. Intercollegiate Championships; New Haven, United States; Grass | (United States) Bob Huntington (3); 9–7, 7–5, 6–1 | (United States) George A. Hurd | | |

=== November ===
| Ended | Tournament | Winner | Finalist | Semifinalist | Quarterfinalist |
|---|---|---|---|---|---|
| 11 Nov. | New South Wales Championships; Sydney, Australia; Grass | (Australia) Dudley Webb; 6–2, 6–3, 6–2 | (Australia) Herbert Webb | | |
| 18 Nov. | Victorian Championships; Melbourne, Australia; Asphalt | (Australia) James Cramond; 6–2, 6–3, 4–6, 2–6, 6–4 | (Australia) Ben Green | | |

=== December ===
No events

== Tournament winners ==
Players are listed by total titles won, major tournaments are in bold.

- (Ireland) Joshua Pim, Dublin IV, Ilkley, Leamington Spa II, Leicester, **Northern Championships** St. Leonards, (6)
- (United Kingdom) Ernest Lewis, Bayswater, Chiswick Park, Exmouth, **Irish Championships** Teignmouth, Torquay, (6)
- (United States) Oliver Campbell, Bay Shore, Nahant, Narragansett, St. Augustine, **U.S. National Championships** (5)
- (Ireland) Grainger Chaytor, Dublin III, Nottingham, Stafford, West Kensington III, (4)
- (United Kingdom) Harry S. Barlow, Bath, Richmond, West Kensington, West Kensington II, (4)
- (Ireland) Willoughby Hamilton, Dublin II, Penarth, **Wimbledon Championships** (3)
- (Ireland) Manliffe Goodbody, Belfast, Buxton, Newcastle, (3)
- (United States) Valentine Gill Hall, Bar Harbor, Bar Harbor II, Hastings-on-Hudson, (3)
- (Scotland) . G. Scott Jackson, Pollokshields, Wemyss Bay II, Wemyss Bay III, (3)
- (United States) Bob Huntington, Harrison, New Haven, New Haven II, (3)
- (United States) Howard Augustus Taylor, Harrison II, Rochester, Southampton, (3)
- (United Kingdom) Charles Gladstone Allen, Felixstowe, Hitchin, Saxmundham, (3)
- (United Kingdom) John Redfern Deykin, Edgbaston, Waterloo, (2)
- (United States) Charles Sands, Bethlehem, Minnetonka (2)
- (United Kingdom) David Davy, Ilkley II, Leeds, (2)
- (United Kingdom) James Baldwin, Edgbaston II, Scarborough, (2)
- (United Kingdom) Ernest Meers, Beckenham, Colchester (2)
- (United States) Edward E. Tanner, Niagara-on-the-Lake, Toronto (2)
- (Australia) William Goodhue, Auckland, Geelong (2)
- (Ireland) Arthur H. G. Ashe, Clones, Waterford (2)

== Sources ==
- Wright & Ditson Officially Adopted Lawn Tennis Guide 1891
- 1890 Tournament Search Tennis Archives. Netherlands.
