= 1889 men's tennis season =

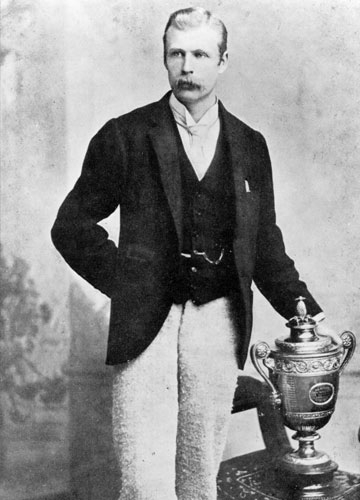
- Irelands 's Willoughby Hamilton won two major tournaments the Irish Championships, and Northern Championships, and was joint second for overall titles at five.

Details
- Duration: 15 January – 27 December
- Edition: 14th
- Tournaments: 140
- Categories: Major (5); Pro (1); National (8 ) Britain & Ireland (76); United States (28); Australasia (9); Canada (1); Europe (5); India & Ceylon (6); South Africa (1)

Achievements (singles)
- Most titles: (United Kingdom) Ernest Lewis (6)
- Most finals: (United Kingdom) Ernest Lewis (7)

The 1889 Men's Tennis Season was a tennis tournament circuit consisting of 140 major, national, professional, regional, provincial, state, county, city and regular tournaments.

It began in January in Madras, India and ended in December in Dunedin, New Zealand.

== Season summary ==
The mens 1889 world tennis season started on 8 January in Madras, India with the Southern India Championships that ended on 15 January, played on clay courts the event is won by Harry Grove.

In mid May at the start of the first major tournament of the season the Irish Lawn Tennis Championships played at the Fitzwilliam Lawn Tennis Club, Dublin, the Irish home player Willoughby Hamilton defeats England's two-time defending champion Ernest Renshaw in straight sets in the final on 31 May.

On 22 June at the second major tournament of the 1889 season the Northern Championships played in Manchester, England, Irish player Willoughby Hamilton reaches his second major final, and wins the title against compatriot Harold Mahony in four sets.

In early July at the third major tournament of the year the Wimbledon Championships England's William Renshaw defeats Harry S. Barlow in five sets the All Comers' Final, and then defeats his brother and reigning champion Ernest Renshaw to claim his seventh and final singles title.

At the end of August the fourth and final major event of season his held the U.S. National Championships played at Newport Casino, Newport, RI in the United States the mens singles title is won by Henry Slocum who beats Quincy Shaw in four sets for a second consecutive and final championship.

At the end of December the 1889 season concluded with the final event of the year the New Zealand Championships, being played on grass in Dunedin, the your is won by Minden Fenwick in four sets over Joy Marshall.

== Season results ==
Key

Major events
National events
Professional events
World wide events

=== January ===
Ended	Tournament	Winner	Finalist	Semifinalist	Quarterfinalist
15 Jan.	Southern India Championships; Madras, India; Clay	(United Kingdom) Harry Grove; 6-2, 7-5	(United Kingdom) Charles Higginbotham		

=== February ===
Ended	Tournament	Winner	Finalist	Semifinalist	Quarterfinalist
11 Feb.	Otago LTA Tournament; Otago II, New Zealand; Grass	(New Zealand) Frederick Dalziel; 9-7 games	(New Zealand) Andrew Borrows		
28 Feb.	Auckland Championships; Auckland, New Zealand; Asphalt	(New Zealand) Eric Hudson walkover	(New Zealand) William Barton		

=== March ===
Ended	Tournament	Winner	Finalist	Semifinalist	Quarterfinalist
15 Mar.	Bengal Championships; Calcutta, India; Grass	(United Kingdom) James Hechie; 3-0 sets	(United Kingdom) W.H. Gorman		
16 Mar.	Punjab Championships; Lahore, India; Grass	(United Kingdom) R. F. Anderson; 6-1, 6-2, 6-4	(United Kingdom) Edward Lee French		
18 Mar.	Tropical Championships; St Augustine, United States; Asphalt	(United States) Oliver Samuel Campbell; 6-2, 6-3, 6-4	(United States) Henry Trevor		
31 Mar.	South Australian Championships; Adelaide, Australia; Asphalt	(Australia) Bert Hambidge; 11-2 games	(Australia) Bill Hambidge		

=== April ===
Ended	Tournament	Winner	Finalist	Semifinalist	Quarterfinalist
6 Apr.	British Covered Court Championships; Bayswater, Great Britain; Wood (i)	(United Kingdom) Ernest Wool Lewis; 6-4, 6-0, 6-3	(United Kingdom) William Taylor		
20 Apr.	Buckley Trophy; Melbourne II, Australia; Grass	(Australia) Arthur Colquhoun; 2-6, 6-2, 6-2, 6-4	(Australia) Norman Bayles		
20 April.	Bombay Gymkhana Club Open; Bombay, India; Grass	(United Kingdom of Great Britain and Ireland) Alfred Sangster; 6-1, 5-6, 6-4	(India) Arthur K. Oliver		
23 Apr.	Geelong Easter Tournament; Geelong, Australia; Asphalt	(Australia) Herbert Webb; 6-3, 6-5, 3-6, 6-1	(Australia) Henry Short		
27 Apr.	Ceylon Championships; Nuwara Eliya, Ceylon; Clay	(United Kingdom) Charles de Fonblanque; 6-2, 6-3, 6-4	(United Kingdom) Alfred Dennison		

=== May ===
Ended	Tournament	Winner	Finalist	Semifinalist	Quarterfinalist
4 May.	Dublin University Championships; Dublin II, Ireland; Asphalt	(Ireland) Harold Mahony walkover	(Ireland) Tom Campion		
6 May.	Fitzwilliam Club Championships; Dublin III, Ireland; Grass	(Ireland) Willoughby Hamilton; 6-0, 6-3, 6-1	(Ireland) Hume Jones		
11 May.	Danish National Championships; Copenhagen, Denmark; Clay	(Denmark) Folmer Hansen def.	(Denmark) ?		
11 May.	New South Wales Championships; Sydney, Australia; Grass	(Australia) Arthur Colquhoun; 6-2, 0-6, 6-3, 6-2	(Australia) Alfred Webb		
25 May.	Pollokshields Open; Pollokshields II, Great Britain; Grass	(Scotland) Alfred Thomson; 6-2, 6-4, 10-8	(Cape Colony) Edward Fuller		
25 May.	West of Scotland Championships; Pollokshields, Great Britain; Grass	(Scotland) G. Scott Jackson; 8-6, 3-6, 4-6, 7-5, 6-3	(Scotland) T. L. Hendry		
26 May.	Flushing Athletic Club Open; Flushing, United States; Surface	(United States) Clarence Hobart def.	(United States) Alex Post		
31 May.	Irish Championships; Dublin, Ireland; Grass	(Ireland) Willoughby Hamilton (2); 12-10, 6-1, 6-3	(United Kingdom) Ernest Renshaw		

=== June ===
Ended	Tournament	Winner	Finalist	Semifinalist	Quarterfinalist
1 Jun.	West of England Championships; Bath, Great Britain; Grass	(United Kingdom) James Baldwin; 7-5, 6-4, 6-4	(United Kingdom) Wilfred Milne		
2 Jun.	Westchester Invitation; Harrison, United States; Asphalt	(United States) Howard Taylor; 6-4, 6-2, 7-5	(United States) Oliver Campbell		
5 Jun.	Cheltenham Championships; Cheltenham, Great Britain; Grass	(United Kingdom) George Hillyard; 6-1, 6-1, 2-6, 4-6, 6-3	(United Kingdom) James Baldwin		
10 Jun.	Whitehouse Open; Edinburgh II, Great Britain; Clay	(Scotland) Archibald Thomson; 6-1, 6-2, 6-3	(United Kingdom) Arthur Story		
14 June.	Lordship Road Tournament; Stoke Newington, Great Britain; Grass	(United Kingdom) E.J. Layton def.	(United Kingdom) Edward White		
14 Jun.	Macclesfield Open; Macclesfield, Great Britain; Grass	(United Kingdom) Arnold Wolff; 6-4, 6-1	(United Kingdom) Conway Morgan		
14 Jun.	London Championships; Stamford Bridge II, Great Britain; Grass	(United Kingdom) Harry S. Barlow score	(United Kingdom) Charles Eames		
14 Jun.	Welsh Championships; Penarth, Great Britain; Grass	(Ireland) Willoughby Hamilton (2); 3-6, 6-3, 6-4, 7-5	(United Kingdom) Ernest Wool Lewis		
15 Jun.	Taylor Challenge Cup; Leeds, Great Britain; Grass	(United Kingdom) David Davy; 9-7, 7-5, 4-6, 6-3	(United Kingdom) Edward Fletcher		
15 Jun.	Waterloo Open; Waterloo, Great Britain; Grass	(United Kingdom) John Redfern Deykin; 7-5, 6-2, 6-2	(United Kingdom) William Dod		
15 Jun.	Scottish Championships; Edinburgh, Great Britain; Grass	(Ireland) Ernest Browne; 4-6, 7-5, 6-1, 6-0	(Scotland) Patrick Bowes-Lyon		
15 Jun.	Middle States Championships; Hoboken, United States; Surface	(United States) Howard Taylor (2); 5-7, 6-2, 6-2, 4-6, 6-1	(United States) Clarence Hobart		
18 Jun.	Dartmouth Championship; Dartmouth, United States; Grass	(United States) H.H. Hilton; 5-7, 3-6, 6-1, 6-3, 6-3	(United States) W.T. Gunnison		
21 Jun.	New England Championships; New Haven II, United States; Grass	(United States) Henry Slocum de.	(United States) Robert Huntington		
22 Jun.	Northern Championships; Manchester, Great Britain; Grass	(Ireland) Willoughby Hamilton (3); 6-3, 3-6, 6-1, 6-2	(Ireland) Harold Mahony		
22 Jun.	Kent Championships; Beckenham, Great Britain; Grass	(United Kingdom) Harry S. Barlow (3); 6-4, 1-6, 6-2, 9-7	(United Kingdom) Ernest Meers		
22 Jun.	North of Ireland Championships; Belfast, Great Britain; Grass	(Ireland) Manliffe Goodbody; 6-3, 6-2, 6-2	(United Kingdom) Thomas Dickson		
22 Jun.	Hudson River Championships; Hastings on Hudson, United States; Grass	(United States) Charles Sands def.	(United States) Valentine Gill Hall		
22 Jun.	Oxford University Championship; Oxford, Great Britain; Grass	(United Kingdom) Arthur Grant; 4-6, 6-3, 0-6 6-2, 6-2	(United Kingdom) Harold Carlton		
28 Jun.	Kent County Championships; Blackheath, Great Britain; Grass	(United Kingdom) Herbert Baddeley; 6-0, 6-2, 6-1	(United Kingdom) Francis Haskett-Smith		
28 Jun.	Lancashire County Championships; Aigburth, Great Britain; Grass	(United Kingdom) T.G. Hill; 6-4, 6-3	(United Kingdom) William Weathered		
29 Jun.	Edgbaston Open; Edgbaston II, Great Britain; Grass	(United Kingdom) James Baldwin (2); 6-4, 6-4, 6-4	(United Kingdom) John Redfern Deykin		
29 Jun.	County Dublin Championships; Dublin IV, Ireland; Grass	(Ireland) Joshua Pim; 6-2, 6-4, 3-6, 4-6, 6-2	(Ireland) Grainger Chaytor		
29 Jun.	Championship of the North of Scotland; Broughty Ferry, Great Britain; Clay	(United Kingdom) Arthur Story; 6-1, 9-7, retd.	(Scotland) William Blyth-Martin		
29 Jun.	New Jersey State Championships; South Orange, United States; Grass	(United States) Clarence Hobart (2); 6-0, 6-4, 6-4	(United States) William K. Fowler		
29 Jun.	Kent Closed Championships; Old Charlton, Great Britain; Grass	(United Kingdom) Ernest Meers; 8-6, 8-6, 4-6, 3-6, 7-5	(United Kingdom) Charles Eames		
29 Jun.	Midland Counties Championships; Edgbaston, Great Britain	(United Kingdom) John Redfern Deykin (2); 2-6, 6-1, 3-6, 6-3, 6-4	(United Kingdom) Harold Weston-Carlton		
29 Jun.	Northumberland Cricket Club Open; Heaton, Great Britain; Grass	(United Kingdom) Patrick Hendy; 6-0, 6-2, 6-3	(United Kingdom) Harold Pease		

=== July ===
Ended	Tournament	Winner	Finalist	Semifinalist	Quarterfinalist
4 Jul.	Pacific Coast Championships; Monterey, United States; Concrete	(United States) William H. Taylor; 6-3, 6-1, 6-2	(United States) Valentine Gadesden		
6 Jul.	Burton-on-Trent Open; Burton-on-Trent, Great Britain; Grass	(United Kingdom) Henry Guy Nadin; 6-3, 6-2, 6-3	(United Kingdom) G. E. Lowe		
6 Jul.	Western States Championships; Chicago, United States; Grass	(United States) Charles A. Chase; 7-5, 4-6, 6-4, 6-1	(United States) Samuel T. Chase		
7.Jul.	Canadian Championships; Toronto,Canada; Grass	(Canada) C.S. Hyman; 6-4, 7-5, 6-4	(Canada) Alfred Plummer		
7 Jul.	Waterbury Cup Invitation; Harrison II, United States; Grass	(United States) Howard Taylor (3) def.	(United States) Percy Knapp		
8 Jul.	Englewood Open; Englewood, United States; Clay	(United States) Clarence Hobart (3); 7-5, 1-6, 6-1, 6-4	(United States) Carroll J. Post		
8 Jul.	Wimbledon Championships; Wimbledon, Great Britain; Grass	(United Kingdom) William Renshaw; 6-4, 6-1, 3-6, 6-0	(United Kingdom) Ernest Renshaw		
10 Jul.	Staffordshire Tournament; Stafford, Great Britain; Grass	(United Kingdom) John Redfern Deykin (3); 6-4, 6-2, 2-6, 4-6, 6-4	(Ireland) William Hamilton		
13 Jul.	Nottinghamshire LTA Tournament; Nottingham, Great Britain; Grass	(Ireland) William Hamilton; 7-5, 3-6, 7-5, 2-6, 6-4	(United Kingdom) Charles Eames		
13 Jul.	Auburndale Challenge Cup; Auburndale, United States; Grass	(United States) Fred S. Mansfield def.	(United States) Fred Hovey		
13 Jul.	Lansdowne Championships; Dublin V, Ireland; Grass	(Ireland) Joshua Pim (2); 8-6, 2-6, 6-2	(Ireland) Frank Stoker		
13 Jul.	Nottinghamshire CCC Open; West Bridgford, Great Britain; Grass	(United Kingdom) Frederick Snook; 9-7, 6-2, 7-9, 6-0	(United Kingdom) Walter Snook		
14 Jul.	Natal Championships; Pietermaritzburg, South Africa; Clay	(Colony of Natal) H. Gazzard; 4-6, 6-4, 6-0	(Colony of Natal) Herbert Millar		
16 Jul.	Northern Counties Challenge Cup; Stockton-on-Tees, Great Britain; Grass	(United Kingdom) William Heard; 4-6, 3-6, 6-1, 9-7, 6-1	(United Kingdom) Frank Noon		
17 Jul.	Warwickshire Championships; Leamington Spa, Great Britain; Grass	(United Kingdom) Guy Black; 6-1, 6-1	(United Kingdom) Francis Burrow		
17 Jul.	Leamington Open; Leamington Spa II, Great Britain; Grass	(United Kingdom) Charles Eames; 4-6, 6-1, 6-2, 3-6, 7-5	(United Kingdom) Frank Noon		
19 Jul.	Montclair Open; City, Country; Surface	(United States) Clarence Hobart (4); 10-8, 12-14, 6-3	(United States) Deane Miller		
20 Jul.	Middlesex Championships; Chiswick Park, Great Britain; Grass	(United Kingdom) Ernest Wool Lewis (3); 6-3, 6-3, 8-6	(United Kingdom) Harry S. Barlow		
20 Jul.	Leicester Open; Leicester, Great Britain; Grass	(United Kingdom) Charles Eames (2); 7-5, 1-6, 10-8, 4-6, 6-2	(Ireland) William Hamilton		
20 Jul.	Hornsey Challenge Cup; Hornsey, Great Britain; Grass	(United Kingdom) J. E. Kingsley def.	(United Kingdom) A. H. Greening		
22 Jul.	Springfield Championship; Springfield, United States; Surface	(United States) Charles A. Chase; 6-4, 6-3	(United States) Albert Empie Wright		
24 Jul.	Market Harborough Tournament; Market Harborough, Great Britain; Grass	(United Kingdom) Frank Noon; 6-4, 6-3, 6-4	(United Kingdom) Ernest Crawley		
24 Jul.	East Orange Open; East Orange, United States; Grass	(United States) J.C. Post jr. 6-3, 6-4, 1-6, 6-1	(United States) D.W. Candler		
27 July.	Southampton Invitation; Southampton, United States; Grass	(United States) Howard Taylor (4); 6-1, 6-4, 6-3	(United States) Joseph Sill Clark		
27 Jul.	Yorkshire Association & County Open; Ilkley, Great Britain; Grass	(Ireland) Joshua Pim (3); 0-6, 6-4, 3-6, 7-5, 6-1	(United Kingdom) Herbert Wilberforce		
27 Jul.	Ilkley Closed Championship; Ilkley II, Great Britain; Grass	(United Kingdom) David Davy (2) walkover	(United Kingdom) Arthur Pease		
27.	North Wales Championships; Denbigh, Great Britain; Grass	(United Kingdom) Henry Fosbery; 5-6, 6-5, 6-5, 6-1	(United Kingdom) George Hayes		
27 July.	Southport Open; Southport, Great Britain; Grass	(United Kingdom) R.B. Swire; 6-4, 6-4	(United Kingdom) T. Morris		

=== August ===
Ended	Tournament	Winner	Finalist	Semifinalist	Quarterfinalist
1 Aug.	Repton Invitation; Repton, Great Britain; Grass	(United Kingdom) Geoffrey Heathcoate-Hacker; 6-1, 6-1	(United Kingdom) R.C. Hamilton		
2 Aug.	East of Ireland Championships; Howth, Ireland; Grass	(Ireland) Willoughby Hamilton (4); 8-6, 6-1, 6-2	(Ireland) Hume Riverdale Jones		
3 Aug.	Somersetshire Championships; Taunton, Great Britain; Grass	(United Kingdom) James Baldwin (3); 6-0, 6-2	(United Kingdom) Francis Hancock		
3 Aug.	Northumberland County Championships; Newcastle, Great Britain; Grass	(United Kingdom) Frank Noon (2); 8-6, 6-3, 4-6, 6-4	(United Kingdom) George Mewburn		
3 Aug.	South Saxon Tennis Tournament; St. Leonards, Great Britain; Grass	(United Kingdom) Ernest Wool Lewis (4); 6-3, 6-2, 6-4	(United Kingdom) Charles P. Hayes		
3 Aug.	Inverkip Rovers Open; Wemyss Bay, Great Britain; Grass	(United States) Louis J. Grant walkover	(Scotland) Richard Millar Watson		
3 Aug.	North Lonsdale Closed; Grange-over-Sands, Great Britain; Grass	(United Kingdom) Guy Seymour Back; 5-7, 6-0, 6-2	(United Kingdom) Edgar Chippendale		
4 Aug.	Simla Tournament; Simla, India; Grass	(United Kingdom of Great Britain and Ireland) W.H Gorman def.	(United Kingdom of Great Britain and Ireland) J.E. Waterfield		
5 Aug.	West Somerset ALTS Tournament; Taunton II, Great Britain; Grass	(United Kingdom) Charles Lacy Sweet; 8-10, 6-2, 7-5	(United Kingdom) Harry S. Barlow		
8 Aug.	Wentworth Open; New Castle, United States; Grass	(United States) Charles A. Chase (2); 6-2, 5-7, 6-4, 6-3	(United States) George Winthrop Lee		
8 Aug.	Rugby Open; Rugby, Great Britain; Grass	(United Kingdom) Jim E. Orr; 2-6, 3-6, 6-3, 6-1, 6-1	(United Kingdom) A. E. Forster		
8 Aug.	Colchester Championship; Colchester, Great Britain; Grass	(United Kingdom) George Norman; 6-2, 2-6, 6-4	(United Kingdom) Alexander White		
9 Aug.	East Grinstead Open; East Grinstead, Great Britain; Grass	(United Kingdom) Herbert Baddeley (2); 6-1, 7-5	(United Kingdom) Wilberforce Eaves		
9 Aug.	Bar Harbor Open; Bar Harbor, United States; Grass	(United States) Joseph Sill Clark Sr. def.	(United States) Robert Beeckman		
10 Aug.	Darlington Association Tournament; Darlington, Great Britain; Grass	(United Kingdom) Frank Noon (3); 6-4, 7-5, 6-2	(United Kingdom) George Mewburn		
10 Aug.	Northwestern Championships; Minnetonka, United States; Concrete	(United States) Trafford Jayne; 6-4, 2-6, 6-2	(United States) Juddy Belden		
10 Aug.	Sheffield & Hallamshire Tournament; Sheffield, Great Britain; Grass	(United Kingdom) David Davy (3); 7-9, 3-6, 6-1, 6-1, 6-3	(United Kingdom) Frederick T. Bradbury		
10 Aug.	Keswick & Lake District Tournament; Keswick, Great Britain; Grass	(United Kingdom) Tancred D. Cummins def.	(United Kingdom) C. J. Chippendale		
10 Aug.	Newtown Tournament; Newtown, Great Britain; Grass	(United Kingdom) W. A. Allen; 7-5, 7-5, 6-1	(Wales) J. T. Williams		
10 Aug.	Grasmere & Keswick Open; Grasmere, Great Britain; Grass	(United Kingdom) G. C. Baker; 8-6, 6-1, 7-5	(United Kingdom) F.E.T. Jones		
11 Aug.	Nahant Invitation; Nahant, United States; Clay	(United States) Charles A. Chase (3); 1st & 2nd RR	(United States) Edward L. Hall		
12 Aug.	Exmouth Open; Exmouth, Great Britain; Grass	(United Kingdom) Ernest Wool Lewis (5); 6-1, 6-2, 6-3	(United Kingdom) John Redfern Deykin		
16 Aug.	Seaton Open; Seaton, Great Britain; Grass	(United Kingdom) Alfred Walker; 7-5, 6-2, 6-3	(United Kingdom) Booth Lynnes		
16 Aug.	Narragansett Open; Narragansett, United States; Grass	(United States) Quincy Shaw; 6-4, 6-4, 6-1	(United States) Howard Taylor		
17 Aug.	Tenby Open; Tenby, Great Britain; Grass	(Wales) G.W.A. Lloyd; 6-4, 6-3, 6-3	(Wales) W.L. Philips		
17 Aug.	Teignmouth & Shaldon Open; Teignmouth, Great Britain; Grass	(United Kingdom) Ernest Wool Lewis (5); 6-4, 6-2, 7-5	(United Kingdom) Harry S. Barlow		
17 Aug.	Derbyshire Championships; Buxton, Great Britain; Grass	(United Kingdom) Percy B. Brown; 6-2, 6-2, 6-1	(United Kingdom) T. G. Hill		
17 Aug.	British Columbia Championships; Victoria, Canada; Grass	(Canada) Charles Longe; 6-1, 6-0, 6-0	(Canada) John Chawner Williams		
17 Aug.	Eastern Counties Championships; Felixstowe, Great Britain; Grass	(United Kingdom) Nevill Cobbold; 1-6, 6-5, 6-3	(United Kingdom) Charles Allen		
17 Aug.	South of Scotland Championships; Moffat, Great Britain; Grass	(Scotland) Alfred Thomson; 6-1, 10-8, 6-3	(Scotland) Richard Millar Watson		
23 Aug.	Walmer Open; Walmer, Great Britain; Grass	(United Kingdom) J. R. Mason def.	(United Kingdom) A. E. Millard		
24 Aug.	North of Wales Open; Abergele, Great Britain; Grass	(Wales) W.L. Wynne; 6-3, 6-4, 4-6, 6-4	(United Kingdom) A F. Saunders		
24.Aug	Le Grand Vaux Open; St Saviour, Jersey; Grass	(Jersey) Hammond Spencer def.	(United Kingdom) Algernon Lushington		
24 Aug.	Fakenham Open; Fakenham, Great Britain; Grass	(United Kingdom) Herbert Rogers; 6-3, 7-6	(Scotland) John Glennie Greig		
25 Aug.	Schwalbach International; Schwalbach, Germany; Clay	(India) Hugh Arathoon def.	(Ireland) Vincent O'Farrell		
25 Aug.	Southern California Championships; Santa Monica, United States; Asphalt	(United States) Robert Carter; 6-3, 6-3, 6-3	(United States) A. Q. Twiss		
26 Aug.	U.S. National Championships; Newport, United States; Grass	(United States) Henry Slocum (2); 6-3, 6-1, 4-6, 6-2	(United States) Quincy Shaw		
27 Aug.	Broadstairs Open; Broadstairs, Great Britain; Grass	(United Kingdom) H.C. Lewin def.	(United Kingdom) A. Cottell		
28 Aug.	North of England Championships; Scarborough, Great; Grass	(United Kingdom) Percy B. Brown (2); 6-3, 6-1, 7-5	(United Kingdom) Harry Grove		
29 Aug.	Saxmundham Open; Saxmundham, Great Britain; Grass	(United Kingdom) Lionel Easton; 6-4, 5-6, 6-3	(United Kingdom) John Wallich		
30 Aug.	Trefriw Open; Trefriw, Great Britain; Grass	(United Kingdom) Henry Fosbery (2); 6-0, 6-1, 6-0	(United Kingdom) Walter Shipman		
30 Aug.	Essex CCC Open; City, Great Britain; Grass	(United Kingdom) Edward Christy walkover	(United Kingdom) Ernest Meers		
31 Aug.	Filey Open; Filey, Great Britain; Grass	(United Kingdom) Alexander Mallinson walkover	(United Kingdom) David Davy		
31 Aug.	Dieppe International Tournament; Dieppe, France; Clay	(United Kingdom) E.G. Easton def.	(United Kingdom) C. Hammans		
31 Aug.	South Berkshire Championship; Caversham, Great Britain; Grass	(United Kingdom) A.P.Norwood; 6-5, 6-4	(United Kingdom) J.L. Errington		

=== September ===
Ended	Tournament	Winner	Finalist	Semifinalist	Quarterfinalist
5 Sep.	Lenox Invitation; Harlem, United States; Grass	(United States) Bob Huntington; 6-3, 6-3, 6-4	(United States) Charles Amherst Chase		
7 Sep.	Sussex Championships; Brighton, Great Britain; Grass	(United Kingdom) Horace Chapman; 6-3, 6-3, 8-6	(United Kingdom) Wilberforce Eaves		
14 Sep.	South of England Championships; Eastbourne, Great Britain; Grass	(United Kingdom) Andrew Ziffo; 4-6, 6-3, 1-6, 9-7, 6-4	(United Kingdom) Harry Grove		
20 Sep.	Southern Championships; Washington, D.C., United States; Clay	(United States) Fred S. Mansfield (2); 4-6, 6-3, 3-6, 6-1, 6-0	(United States) Alex Post		
21 Sep.	Harrogate Dragon Club Open; Harrogate, Great Britain; Grass	(United Kingdom) W. T. Oliver; 2-6, 6-0- 6-3, 6-1	(United Kingdom) George Atkinson		
21 Sep.	Boulogne International Championship; Boulogne-sur-Mer, France; Clay	(United Kingdom) Wilberforce Eaves walkover	(United Kingdom) Edgar Chippendale		
21 Sep.	Chingford Open; Chingford, Great Britain; Grass	(United Kingdom) Charles G. Eames (3) walkover	(United Kingdom) Arthur Fagan		
22 Sep.	Springfield Invitational; Springfield II, United States; Clay	(United States) Charles A. Chase (5) def.	(United States) Quincy Shaw		
22 Sep.	Dinard Cup; Dinard, France; Clay	(United Kingdom) Arthur Gore; 6-4,6-3, 6-3	(United Kingdom) Reginald Villiers-Forbes		
22 Sep.	Wissahickon Fall Tournament; Wissahickon, United States; Clay	(United States) C.T. Cowperthwaite; 6-2, 6-3	(United States) W.P. Cresson		
24.Sep.	New Hamburg Invitation; New Hamburg, United States; Grass	(United States) Charles Sands (2); 6-2, 4-6, 6-3, 8-6	(United States) Oliver Samuel Campbell		
28 Sep.	Western Pennsylvania Championships; Pittsburgh, United States; Clay	(United States) Marshall Christy def.	(United States) Martyn Coster		
29 Sep.	New York TC Fall Open; New York City, United States; Clay	(United States) Alex Post; 6-3, 6-1, 6-3	(United States) Edward L. Hall		

=== October ===
Ended	Tournament	Winner	Finalist	Semifinalist	Quarterfinalist
2 Oct.	World Pro Championships; Boston, United States; Grass	(Ireland) George Kerr; 3-1 matches	(United Kingdom) Tom Pettitt		
15 Oct.	Queensland Association Championships; Brisbane, Australia; Grass	(Australia) Eric Hudson; 3-6, 8-6, 6-4, 3-6, 6-2	(Australia) Arthur Taylor		
18 Oct.	Southwestern Tournament (3rd ed); Excelsior Springs, United States; Clay	(United States) J.H. Farrish; 6-3, 6-0, 6-2	(United States) George Devol		
19 Oct .	U.S. Intercollegiate Championships; New Haven, United States; Grass	(United States) Bob Huntington (2); 9-7, 7-5, 6-1	(United States) George Hurd		

=== November ===
Ended	Tournament	Winner	Finalist	Semifinalist	Quarterfinalist
16 Nov.	Victorian Championships; Melbourne, Australia; Asphalt	(Australia) Richard Shuter; 6-1, 3-6, 6-1, 6-0	(Australia) Charlie Cropper		

=== December ===
Ended	Tournament	Winner	Finalist	Semifinalist	Quarterfinalist
30 Dec.	New Zealand Championships; Dunedin, New Zealand; Grass	(New Zealand) Minden Fenwick; 6-4, 0-6, 6-3, 6-3	(New Zealand) Joy Marshall		

== Tournament winners ==
Are listed by total titles won, major tournaments in bold.

- (United Kingdom) Ernest Wool Lewis, Bayswater, Bournemouth, Chiswick Park, Exmouth, St. Leonards, Teignmouth, (6)
- (United States) Charles Amherst Chase, Chicago, Nahant, New Castle, Springfield, Springfield II, (5)
- (Ireland) Willoughby Hamilton, Dublin III, Howth, **Irish Championships**, **Northern Championships**, Penarth, (5)
- (United States) Clarence Hobart, Englewood, Flushing, Montclair, South Orange, (4)
- (United States) Howard Taylor, Harrison, Harrison II, Hoboken, Southampton, (4)
- (Ireland) Joshua Pim, Dublin IV, Dublin V, Ilkley, (3)
- (United Kingdom) Charles G. Eames, Chingford, Leamington Spa II, Leicester, (3)
- (United Kingdom) David Davy, Ilkley II, Leeds, Sheffield, (3)
- (United Kingdom) James Baldwin, Bath, Edgbaston II, Taunton, (3)
- (United Kingdom) John Redfern Deykin, Edgbaston, Stafford, Waterloo, (3)
- (United Kingdom) Frank Noon, Darlington, Market Harborough, Newcastle (3)
- (United States) Henry Slocum, New Haven II, **U.S. National Championships**, (2)
- (United Kingdom) Herbert Baddeley, Blackheath, East Grinstead (2)
- (United States) Bob Huntington, Harlem, New Haven, (2)
- (United Kingdom) Percy Bateman Brown, Buxton, Saxmundham, (2)
- (United States) Fred S. Mansfield, Aburndale, Washington D.C.,(2)
- (United Kingdom) Harry S. Barlow, Beckenham, Stamford Bridge, (2)
- (United States) Charles Sands, Hastings-on-Hudson, New Hamburg, (2)
- (United Kingdom) Henry Fosbery, Denbigh, Trefriw, (2)
- (United Kingdom) Guy Seymour Black, Leamington Spa, Grange-over-Sands (2)
- (United Kingdom) William Renshaw, **Wimbledon Championships**, (1)
- (Ireland) George Kerr, **World Pro Championships**, (1)
