= 1891 men's tennis season =

1891 Men's Tennis Season
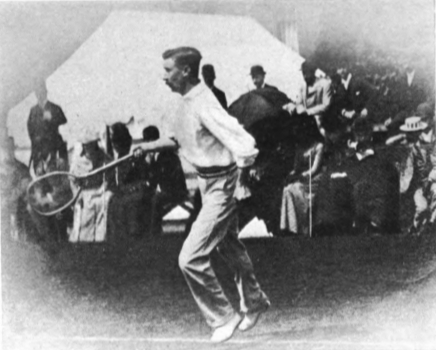
- Harry Barlow c.1900 is title leader winning 7 events from 10 finals

Details
- Duration: 10 January – 31 December
- Edition: 16th
- Tournaments: 127
- Categories: Major (4); National (12); Britain & Ireland (58); United States (26); Australasia (8); Canada (3); Europe (5); India & Ceylon (7); South Africa (2)

Achievements (singles)
- Most titles: (United Kingdom) Harry S. Barlow (7)
- Most finals: (United Kingdom) Harry S. Barlow (10)

The 1891 Men's Tennis Season was a worldwide tennis tournament circuit consisting of 127 major, national, professional, regional, provincial, state, county, city and regular tournaments.

The season began on 10 January in Chepauk, India and ended 31 December in Napier, New Zealand.

== Season summary ==
The men's 1891 tennis season began on 10 January with the South India Championships played on clay in Chepauk, India the event concluded on 17 January with England's Charles Higginbotham defeating compatriot William Barton in straight sets.

In March the South African Championships are held in Port Elizabeth, South Africa on clay courts and is won by Andrew Richardson who beats fellow countryman Lyttleton Forbes-Winslow in three sets

In May the French Championships are held in Paris, France that is won by British resident H. Briggs who defeats French player P. Baigneres in straight sets.

At the very start of June the first major tournament of the season the Irish Championships in Dublin, Ireland is concluded on the first day of the month, and the singles title is won by the English defending champion Ernest Wool Lewis who defeats the Irish favourite Joshua Pim in straight sets.

At the second major tournament of the year the Northern Championships is held in Manchester, England concluded on 20 June with Irish player Joshua Pim reaching his second consecutive major event wins the singles title defeating England's Wilfred Baddeley in four sets.

At the beginning July at the third and biggest major event of the season the Wimbledon Championships England's Wilfred Baddeley defeats the Irish champion Joshua Pim in four sets in the all comers' final, and goes on to win the title by a walkover when the reigning champion, Willoughby Hamilton, fails to defend his title.

At the end of August at the fourth and final major tournament of the year the U.S. National Championships held in Newport, Rhode Island Oliver Campbell Wins the singles title in five hard sets against Clarence Hobart.

At the end of December the season ends with the New Zealand Championships in Napier with Richard Harman defeating his fellow countryman Joy Marshall in three sets.

== Season results ==
Key

Major events
National events
Professional events

=== January ===
Ended	Tournament	Winner	Finalist	Semifinalist	Quarterfinalist
25 Jan.	South India Championships; Chepauk, India; Clay	(United Kingdom) Charles Higginbotham; 6-1, 6-4	(United Kingdom) William Barton		

=== February ===
Ended	Tournament	Winner	Finalist	Semifinalist	Quarterfinalist
10 Feb.	Marryatt Cup; Bombay, India; Clay	(United Kingdom) Eustace Nicholson; 6-5, 3–6, 6-5	(United Kingdom) Arthur Barton		

=== March ===
Ended	Tournament	Winner	Finalist	Semifinalist	Quarterfinalist
7 Mar.	Bombay Gymkhana Club Tournament; Bombay II, India; Grass	(United Kingdom) Eustace Nicholson (2) def.	(United Kingdom) Arthur Barton		
8 Mar.	Magnolia Springs Open; Magnolia Springs, United States; Concrete	(United States) Albert Empie Wright; 6-2, 6–4, 7-5	(United States) J. B. Baumgarten		
14 Mar.	Calcutta Cricket Club Open; Calcutta II, India; Grass	(Scotland) Henry Fleming; 6-0, 6–1, 6-2	(Scotland) George Colville		
14 Mar.	South Australian Championships; Adelaide, Australia; Asphalt	(Australia) John Baker; 13-7 games	(Australia) Bert Hambidge		
15 Mar.	Tropical Championships; St. Augustine, United States; Asphalt	(United States) Oliver Campbell; 10-8, 6–1, 7-5	(United States) Albert Empie Wright		
15 Mar.	Bengal Championships; Calcutta, India; Grass	(Scotland) Henry Fleming (2); 6-0, 6–1, 6-2	(Scotland) George Colville		
19 Mar.	Ceylon Championships; Nuwara Eliya, Ceylon; Clay	(United Kingdom) Charles de Fonblanque walkover	(United Kingdom) James Dove		
25 Mar.	Punjab Championships; Lahore, India; Grass	(Scotland) Henry Fleming (3) def.	?		
29 Mar.	South African Championships; Port Elizabeth, South Africa; Clay	(South Africa) Andrew Richardson; 6-2, 10–8, 6-2	(South Africa) Lyndhurst Winslow		
30 Mar.	Māori Open Tournament; Wanganui, New Zealand; Grass	(New Zealand) Harry Parker def.?	(New Zealand) Joy Marshall		
31 Mar.	Geelong Easter Tournament; Geelong, Australia; Asphalt	(Australia) Ben Green; 6-3, 0–6, 6–5, 6-5	(Australia) Herbert Webb		

=== April ===
Ended	Tournament	Winner	Finalist	Semifinalist	Quarterfinalist
10 Apr.	London Covered Court Championships; West Kensington, Great Britain; Wood (i)	(United Kingdom) Harry S. Barlow; 3-6, 8–6, 6–8, 6–3, 6-1	(United Kingdom) Horace Chapman		
19 Apr.	British Covered Court Championships; Bayswater, Great Britain; Wood (i)	(United Kingdom) Ernest Wool Lewis; 6-4, 8–6, 6-3	(United Kingdom) Ernest Meers		
22 Apr.	Buckley Trophy; Melbourne II, Australia; Grass	(United Kingdom) Wilberforce Eaves; 3-0 sets	(Australia) Haworth Bartram		

=== May ===
Ended	Tournament	Winner	Finalist	Semifinalist	Quarterfinalist
3 May.	Dublin University Championships; Dublin III, Ireland; Asphalt	(Ireland) Tom Chaytor; 6–2, 6–1, 6-3	(Ireland) Arthur H. G. Ashe		
16 May.	New South Wales Championships; Sydney, Australia; Grass	(United Kingdom) Wilberforce Eaves (2); 3-6, 6–3, 6–4, 8-6	(Australia) Dudley Webb		
17 May.	Danish National Championships; Copenhagen, Denmark; Clay	(Denmark) Folmer Hansen; Def.	(Denmark) ?		
17 Mar.	French Championships; Paris, France; Clay	(United Kingdom) H. Briggs; 6-3, 6-4	(France) Paul Baigneres		
22 May.	Southern Championships; Washington D.C. United States; Clay	(United States) Edward L. Hall; 6-4, 6–4, 4–6, 3–6, 6-3	(United States) Valentine Gill Hall		
23 May.	Fitzwilliam Club Championships; Dublin II, Ireland; Grass	(Ireland) Grainger Chaytor; 8-6, 7–5, 6-3	(Ireland) William Hamilton		
30 May.	Pollokshields Open; Pollokshields II, Great Britain; Grass	(Scotland) Alfred Aitken Thomson; 1-6, 6–1, 6–2, 8–10, 6-1	(United Kingdom) Edward Fuller		
30 May.	West of Scotland Championships; Pollokshields, Great Britain; Grass	(Scotland) Thomas Henry walkover	(Scotland) G. Scott Jackson		

=== June ===
Ended	Tournament	Winner	Finalist	Semifinalist	Quarterfinalist
1 Jun.	Irish Championships; Dublin, Ireland; Grass	(United Kingdom) Ernest Wool Lewis (2); 6-2, 6–3, 8-6	(Ireland) Joshua Pim		
4 Jun.	New York TC Spring Open; New York City, United States; Clay	(United States) Edward L. Hall (2); 6-1, 6–3, 6-2	(United States) J. F. Hobart		
6 Jun.	Waterloo Open Tournament; Waterloo, Great Britain; Grass	(United Kingdom) Jacob Gaitskell Brown; 6-1, 6–0, 5–7, 8-6	(United Kingdom) John Redfern Deykin		
6 Jun.	West of England Championships; Bath, Great Britain; Grass	(United Kingdom) Harry S. Barlow (2); 2-6, 6–3, 6–4, 6-4	(United Kingdom) James Baldwin		
12 Jun.	New Jersey State Championships; Montrose, United States; Grass	(United States) Clarence Hobart def.	(United States) Richard T. Stevens		
13 Jun.	Scottish Championships; Edinburgh, Great Britain; Grass	(Ireland) Ernest Browne; 6-3, 6–3, 6-1	(Australia) Arthur Carvosso		
13 Jun.	Tuxedo Invitation; Tuxedo Park, United States; Grass	(United States) Edward L. Hall (3); 6-4, 4–6, 6–4, 4–6, 6-0	(United States) Albert Empie Wright		
13 Jun.	Gloucestershire Lawn Tennis Tournament; Cheltenham, Great Britain; Grass	(United Kingdom) Frank Stoddart; 3-6, 6–2, 9–7, 6-2	(United Kingdom) Sydney Howard Smith		
13 Jun.	North of Ireland Championships; Belfast, Ireland; Grass	(Ireland) George Ball-Greene walkover	(Ireland) Manliffe Goodbody		
13 Jun.	Cheltenham Championships; Cheltenham II, Great Britain; Grass	(United Kingdom) Ernest Wool Lewis (3); 6-4, 6–3, 6-2	(United Kingdom) Harry S. Barlow		
13 Jun.	Cheltenham Challenge Cup; Cheltenham III, Great Britain; Grass	(United Kingdom) Harry S. Barlow (3); 7-5, 6–3, 6-2	(United Kingdom) Tancred Cummins		
14 Jun.	Welsh Championships; Cardiff, Great Britain; Grass	(United Kingdom) Harry S. Barlow (4); 5-7, 6–2, 7–5, 0–6, 6-1	(Ireland) Harold Mahony		
20 Jun.	Northern Championships; Manchester, Great Britain; Grass	(Ireland) Joshua Pim; 7-5, 6–3, 6-2	(United Kingdom) Wilfred Baddeley		
20 Jun.	Kent Championships; Beckenham, Great Britain; Grass	(United Kingdom) Ernest Meers; 6–0, 6–2, 6-2	(United Kingdom) Arthur Gore		
20 Jun.	New England Championships; New Haven II, United States; Grass	(United States) Charles Lee; 2-6, 10–8, 4–6, 6–1, 6-1	(United States) Bob Huntington		
27 Jun.	Yorkshire Open Championships; Headingley, Great Britain; Grass	(Ireland) Joshua Pim (2); 6–2, 6–0, retd.	(United Kingdom) James Baldwin		
27 Jun.	Ilkley Open; Ilkley, Great Britain; Grass	(United Kingdom) David Davy; 7-5, 2–6, 3–6, 6–4, 6-3	(United Kingdom) Charles Wade		
27 Jun.	Kent Closed Championships; Blackheath, Great Britain; Grass	(United Kingdom) Herbert Baddeley; 6–2, 6–3, 6-4	(United Kingdom) Francis Haskett-Smith		
28 Jun.	Kent County Open; Blackheath II, Great Britain; Grass	(Australia) Samuel H. Hughes; 6-2, 6–2, 9-7	(United Kingdom) Walter Hadden		
28 Jun.	Middle States Championships; Hoboken, United States; Grass	(United States) Charles Sands walkover	(United States) Howard A. Taylor		
29 Jun.	County Dublin Championships; Dublin IV, Ireland; Grass	(Ireland) Herbert McKay; 6-2, 2–6, 6–2, 7–9, 6-4	(Ireland) Frank Stoker		
29 Jun.	Wissahickon Open; Chestnut Hill, United States; Grass	(United States) Marion Wright; 4-6, 6–3, 6-3	(United States) Joseph Sill Clark Sr.		

=== July ===
Included.

Ended	Tournament	Winner	Finalist	Semifinalist	Quarterfinalist
4 Jul.	Pacific Coast Championships; San Rafael, United States; Asphalt	(United States) William H. Taylor; 6-2, 6–1, 5–7, 6-3	(United States) Charles Hubbard		
4 Jun.	Wimbledon Championships; Wimbledon, Great Britain; Grass	(United Kingdom) Wilfred Baddeley walkover	(Ireland) Willoughby Hamilton		
5 Jul.	Anglo Dutch Open; Rotterdam, Netherlands; Clay	(United Kingdom) A. C. McLachlan; 6-3, 5–7, 6-2	(Netherlands) N.A.M. van Aken		
10 Jul.	King's County & Ormonde Tournament; Parsonstown, Ireland; Grass	(Ireland) Herbert Craig; 6-2, 6–2, 6-2	(Ireland) John Head		
10 Jul.	Wentworth Open; New Castle, United States; Grass	(United States) Fred Hovey; 4–6, 6–4, 6–0, 6-2	(United States) Hugh Tallant		
12 Jul.	Pacific Northwest Championships; Tacoma, United States; Clay	(United States) Arthur Aryault; 4-6, 6–3, 6–4, 6-3	(United States) John le. b Johnson		
12 Jul.	Auburndale Challenge Cup; Aburndale, United States; Grass	(United States) Bob Wrenn def.	(United States) Fred Hovey		
12 Jul.	Westchester Invitation; Harrison, United States; Grass	(United States) Clarence Hobart (2); 9-7, 6–4, 4–6, 6-4	(United States) Bob Huntington		
15 Jul.	Dumfries Open; Dumfries, Great Britain; Grass	(Scotland) Thomas Stott; 6-0, 6–2, 6-2	(Scotland) Jim Stott		
17 Jul.	New York State Championships; Saratoga, United States	(United States) Fred Hovey (3); 7-5, 4–6, 6–0, 3–6, 6-3	(United States) Edward L. Hall		
18 Jul.	London Championships; West Kensington II, Great Britain; Grass	(United Kingdom) Harry S. Barlow (5); 6-4, 2–6, 6–0, 7-5	(Ireland) Joshua Pim		
18 Jul.	Canadian Championships; Niagra-on-the-Lake, Canada; Grass	(United States) Fred Mansfield; 6-1, 6–1, 6-1	(United States) Edward Tanner		
18 Jul.	Nottinghamshire LTA Tournament; Nottingham, Great Britain; Grass	(Ireland) Frank Stoker; 6-3, 3–6, 6–3, 6-3	(Ireland) Tom Chaytor		
18 Jul.	Western Pennsylvania Championships; Pittsburgh, United States; Clay	(United States) Charles Buch def.	(United States) Samuel Moorhead		
18 Jul.	Hull Open; Hull, Great Britain; Grass	(United Kingdom) Henry Winter walkover	(United Kingdom) Edward Samson		
19 Jul.	Montclair Open; Montclair, United States; Grass	(United States) Bill Larned; 4-6, 6–1, 3–6, 8–6, 6-1	(United States) Stephen Millett		
19 Jul.	Seabright Invitational; Rumson, United States; Grass	(United States) Richard Stevens; 2-6, 1–6, 6–0, 6–3, 6-2	(United States) A.W. Post		
20 Jul.	Western Championships; Chicago, United States; Grass	(United States) Samuel T. Chase; 3-6, 6–2, 6–3, 6-2	(United States) B.F. Cummins		
21 Jul.	Natal Championships; Pietermaritzburg, South Africa; Clay	(Colony of Natal) Herbert Millar; 6–3, 6–4, 6-4	(Colony of Natal) William Grant		
22 Jul.	Burton-on-Trent Open; Burton-on-Trent, Great Britain; Grass	(United Kingdom) James Baldwin; 6-4, 2–6, 6–3, 4–6, 9-7	(Ireland) Tom Chaytor		
23 Jul.	Leamington Open; Leamington II, Great Britain; Grass	(United Kingdom) John Redfern Deykin; 6-2, 6-3	(United Kingdom) G. F. Goodman		
23 Jul.	Warwickshire Championships; Leamington, Great Britain; Grass	(Ireland) Joshua Pim (3); 8-10, 6–2, 6–3, 6-2	(Ireland) Harold Mahony		
24 Jul.	Clones Open Challenge Cup; Clones, Ireland; Grass	(Ireland) Arthur A.G. Ashe; 6-2, 6–3, 2–6, 2–6, 6-4	(Ireland) E.P. Rowe		
25 Jul.	Middlesex Championships; Chiswick Park, Great Britain; Grass	(United Kingdom) Ernest Meers (2) walkover	(United Kingdom) Ernest Wool Lewis		
25 Jul.	Edgbaston Open; Edgbaston II, Great Britain; Grass	(United Kingdom) R. A. Bennett; 6-2, 6-4	(United Kingdom) Henry Guy Nadin		
25 Jul.	Leicester Open; Leicester, Great Britain; Grass	(Ireland) Harold Mahony; 7-5, 6–2, 2–6, 4–6, 6-4	(Ireland) Joshua Pim		
25 Jul.	Midland Counties Championships; Edgbaston, Great Britain; Grass	(United Kingdom) James Baldwin (2); 6-3, 7–9, 3–6, 6–2, 6-1	(United Kingdom) Harry Barlow		
25 Jul.	Queen's Challenge Cup; West Kensington III, Great Britain; Grass	(Ireland) Joshua Pim (4); 2-6, 6–1, 6–2, 6-3	(Ireland) Harold Mahony		
26 Jul.	Southampton Invitation; Southampton, United States; Grass	(United States) Valentine Gill Hall walkover	(United States) Howard A. Taylor		
28 Jul.	Market Harborough Tournament; Market Harborough, Great Britain; Grass	(United Kingdom) Charles Sidney Viccars walkover	(United Kingdom) Frank Noon		
31 Jul.	Longwood Bowl; Boston, United States; Grass	(United States) Edward L. Hall (4); 6-1, 8–6, 6-3	(United States) Philip Sears		

=== August ===
Ended	Tournament	Winner	Finalist	Semifinalist	Quarterfinalist
1 Aug.	Somersetshire Championships; Taunton, Great Britain; Grass	(United Kingdom) Arnold Blake; 2-6, 6–4, 11-9	(United Kingdom) Kenneth Marley		
1 Aug.	Rushbrooke Open; Rushhbrooke, Ireland; Grass	(Ireland) Michael G. McNamara; 8-10, 7–5, 6–4, 6-2	(Ireland) William Perrott		
3 Aug.	Sheffield & Hallamshire Tournament; Sheffield, Great Britain; Grass	(United Kingdom) Herbert Wilberforce; 6-2, 6–4, 6-4	(United Kingdom) Tancred Cummins		
5 Aug.	Scheveningen International Tournament; Schevenigen, Netherlands; Cement	(Netherlands) Leendert Boeye; 6-4, 5–6, 6-1	(Netherlands) A. P. van Aken		
6 Aug.	Darlington Open; Darlington, Great Britain; Grass	(Ireland) George Ball-Greene (2); 6-4, 6–3, 1–6, 6-2	(United Kingdom) Harold Carlton		
6 Aug.	Exmouth Open; Exmouth, Great Britain; Grass	(United Kingdom) Ernest Wool Lewis (4); 6-1, 6–4, 7-5	(United Kingdom) Horace Chapman		
8 Aug.	Isle of Man Championships; Douglas, I.O.M. Grass	(Isle of Man) Thomas Moffat; 6-2. 6-0	(Isle of Man) James Richardson		
8 Aug.	Castle Wemyss Cup; Wemyss Bay II, Great Britain; Grass	(Scotland) Richard Millar Watson; 6-3, 6–2, 6-4	(Ireland) Gerald Peacocke		
8 Aug.	North of Wales Open; Abergele, Great Britain; Grass	(Ireland) Herbert Craig; 6-3, 2–6, 3–6, 6–2, 6-4	(United Kingdom) Arnold Wolf		
8 Aug.	Inverkip Rovers Open; Wemyss Bay, Great Britain; Grass	(Scotland) Richard Millar Watson (2) walkover	(Scotland) G. Scott Jackson		
8 Aug.	Inverkip Rovers Closed Championships; Wemyss Bay III, Great Britain; Grass	(United Kingdom) Charles Higginbotham (2); 3-6, 6–4, 6–3, 6-2	(Scotland) John E. Orr		
9 Aug.	Nahant Invitation; Nahant, United States; Clay	(United States) Clarence Hobart(3); 6-3, 4–6, 6-2	(United States) Bob Huntington		
11 Aug.	Cooperstown Open; Cooperstown, United States; Surface	(United States) Marion Wright (2); 4-6, 4–6, 7–5, 9–7, 6-4	(United States) Deane Miller		
11 Aug.	Fakenham Open; Fakenham, Great Britain; Grass	(United Kingdom) John Grieg walkover	(United Kingdom) Herbert Rogers		
11 Aug.	Transvaal Championships; Johannesburg, South Africa; Clay	(Transvaal Colony) Edward Curtis; 6-2, 6–0, 6-4	(Transvaal Colony) R.A. Van Leenhoff		
14 Aug.	Seaton Open; Seaton, Great Britain; Grass	(United Kingdom) F.D. Colt; 6-2, 6–0, 6-1	(United Kingdom) G. Porter		
15 Aug.	Derbyshire Championships; Buxton, Great Britain; Grass	(Ireland) Grainger Chaytor (2); 6-1, 6–1, 6-3	(Ireland) George Ball-Greene		
15 Aug.	Royston Open; Royston, Great Britain; Grass	(United Kingdom) Stuart Baddeley; 3-6, 6–0, 6-3	(United Kingdom) Horace Elgood		
15 Aug.	Teignmouth & Shaldon Open; Teignmouth, Great Britain; Grass	(Ireland) Manliffe Goodbody; 6-0, 0–6, 6-4	(United Kingdom) Horace Chapman		
15 Aug.	Eastern Counties Championships; Felixstowe, Great Britain; Grass	(United Kingdom) Roy Allen	(United Kingdom) Charles Gladstone Allen		
17 Aug.	Netherlands National Championships; Wijk aan Zee, Netherlands; Clay	(Netherlands) Raymond Boeye def.	(Netherlands) Claes des Gras		
17 Aug.	South of Scotland Championships; Moffat, Great Britain; Grass	(Scotland) Richard Millar Watson (3) walkover	(Scotland) Alfred Thompson		
20 Aug.	Saxmundham Open; Saxmundham, Great Britain; Grass	(United Kingdom) Charles Gladstone Allen walkover	(United Kingdom) Roy Allen		
21 Aug.	Maritime Provinces Championships; St. John, Canada; Clay	(Canada) T. R. Ryan; 7-5, 2–6, 6-4	(Canada) W. M. Alexander		
22 Aug.	British Columbia Championships; Victoria, Canada; Grass	(United Kingdom) Charles Longe; 6-8, 6–0, 6–1, 6-3	(Canada) J. F. Foulkes		
22 Aug.	East of Scotland Championships; St. Andrews, Great Britain; Grass	(Ireland) Grainger Chaytor (3); 6-2, 6–0, 7-5	(Scotland) Richard Millar Watson		
22 Aug.	Queensland Championships; Brisbane, Australia; Grass	(Australia) Arthur Taylor; 6-3, 6–4, 4–6, 5–6, 6-2	(Australia) Peter McGregor		
22 Aug.	North of England Championships; Scarborough, Great Britain; Grass	(United Kingdom) Harry S. Barlow (6); 6-3, 6–2, 2–6, 7-5	(United Kingdom) James Baldwin		
22 Aug.	Taylor Challenge Cup; Leeds, Great Britain; Grass	(United Kingdom) David Davy (2) def.	(United Kingdom) Charles Wade		
24 Aug.	Essex Championships; Colchester, Great Britain; Grass	(United Kingdom) Arthur Gore; 10-12, 2–6, 6–2, 6–3, 6-3	(United Kingdom) Charles G. Eames		
26 Aug.	U.S. National Championships; Newport, RI, United States; Grass	(United States) Oliver Campbell (2); 2-6, 7-5, 7-9, 6-1, 6-2	(United States) Clarence Hobart		
28 Aug.	Manitoba & Northwestern Championships; Winnipeg, Canada; Grass	(Canada) F. R. Goodwin; 3-6, 6–3, 9-7	(Canada) Barney Toole		
28 Aug.	U.S. Championships Consolation; Newport II, United States; Grass	(United States) Harold McCormick; 8-6, 6–4, 6-4	(United States) Duncan Candler		
29 Aug.	Bournemouth Open; Bournemouth, Great Britain; Grass	(United Kingdom) Horace Chapman; 10-12, 9–7, 6–3, 6-4	(United Kingdom) Harry S. Barlow		
29 Aug.	West Sussex Challenge Cup; Chichester, Great Britain; Grass	(United Kingdom) George Orme; 6-4, 8–10, 6–4, 6-1	(United Kingdom) Stuart Bathurst		
29 Aug.	Aldeburgh Open; Aldeburgh, Great Britain; Grass	(United Kingdom) Alexander Miller-White; 5-7, 6–2, 6-2	(United Kingdom) Charles Cullingham		
29 Aug.	Gore Court Championships; Sittingbourne, Great Britain; Grass	(United Kingdom) A. R. Stephenson; 6-3, 2–6, 6–4, 6-4	(United Kingdom) Ernest Meers		
29 Aug.	Hitchin Open; Hitchin, Great Britain; Grass	(United Kingdom) Osmond McMullen; 6-3, 6-1	(United Kingdom) Percy Bateman Brown		
30 Aug.	Championships of Hamburg; Hamburg, Germany; Clay	(United States) William Howard; 6-2, 6-4	(Scotland) J. C. Howard		

=== September ===
Ended	Tournament	Winner	Finalist	Semifinalist	Quarterfinalist
3 Sep.	Southern California Championships; Santa Monica, United States; Asphalt	(United States) Theodore Coulter walkover	(United States) Robert P. Carter		
4 Sep.	Sussex Championships; Brighton, Great Britain; Grass	(Ireland) Grainger Chaytor (4) walkover	(United Kingdom) Wilfred Baddeley		
12 Sep.	South of England Championships; Eastbourne, Great Britain; Grass	(United Kingdom) Harry S. Barlow (7); 6-3, 7–5, 6-0	(United Kingdom) Andrew Ziffo		
13 Sep.	Dinard Cup; Dinard, France; Clay	(United Kingdom) Arthur Gore (2); 11-9, retd.	(United Kingdom) Horace Chapman		
18 Sep.	Philadelphia & District Championships; West Philadelphia, United States; Grass	(United States) Marmaduke Smith def.	(United States) ?		
19 Sep.	Filey Open; Filey, Great Britain; Grass	(United Kingdom) Morris Dalton-Holmes walkover	(United Kingdom) Frederick Tollitt		
19 Sep.	Boulogne International Championship; Boulogne-sur-Mer, France; Clay	(United Kingdom) Roy Allen (2) walkover	(United Kingdom) Charles Gladstone Allen		
26 Sep.	Walmer Open; Walmer, Great Britain; Clay	(Italy) J. R. Masoni def.	(United Kingdom) C. E. Mason		

=== October ===
Ended	Tournament	Winner	Finalist	Semifinalist	Quarterfinalist
9 Oct.	U.S. Intercollegiate Championships; New Haven, United States; Grass	(United States) Fred Hovey (4); 6-2, 6–4, 9-7	(United States) Charles T. Lee		

=== November ===
Ended	Tournament	Winner	Finalist	Semifinalist	Quarterfinalist
14 Nov.	Victorian Championships; Melbourne, Australia; Asphalt	(Australia) Gus Kearney; 6-2, 5–7, 1–6, 6–4, 6-2	(Australia) Richard Shuter		

=== December ===
Ended	Tournament	Winner	Finalist	Semifinalist	Quarterfinalist
30 Dec.	New Zealand Championships; Napier, New Zealand; Grass	(New Zealand) Richard Harman; 6-4, 6–4, 10-8	(New Zealand) Joy Marshall		

== Tournament winners ==
Players are listed by total titles won, Major tournaments are in bold.

- (United Kingdom) Harry S. Barlow, Bath, Cardiff, Cheltenham III, Eastbourne, Scarborough, West Kensington, West Kensington II, (7)
- (Ireland) Joshua Pim, Headingley, Leamington Spa, **Northern Championships**, St. Leonards, West Kensington III, (5)
- (United Kingdom) Ernest Wool Lewis, Bayswater, Cheltenham II, Exmouth, **Irish Championships**, (4)
- (Ireland) Grainger Chaytor, Brighton, Buxton, Dublin II, St. Andrews (4)
- (United States) Edward L. Hall, Boston, New York City, Tuxedo Park, Washington D.C., (4)
- (Scotland) Richard Millar Watson Moffat, Wemyss Bay, Wemyss Bay II, (3)
- (United States) Fred Hovey New Castle, New Haven, Saratoga (3)
- (Scotland) Henry Fleming, Calcutta, Calcutta II, Lahore, (3)
- (United States) Oliver Campbell, St. Augustine, **U.S. National Championships** (2)
- (Ireland) George Ball-Greene, Belfast, Darlington, (2)
- (United Kingdom) Eustace Nicholson, Bombay, Bombay II, (2)
- (United States) Clarence Hobart Harrison, Montrose, (2)
- (United Kingdom) Wilberforce Eaves, Melbourne II, Sydney, (2)
- (United Kingdom) Ernest Meers, Beckenham, Chiswick Park (2)
- (United States) , Marion Wright, Chestnut Hill, Cooperstown, (2)
- (United Kingdom) Arthur Gore, Colchester, Dinard, (2)
- (United Kingdom) James Baldwin, Burton-upon-Trent, Edgbaston, (2)
- (United Kingdom) Charles Higginbotham, Chepauk, Wemyss Bay III, (2)
- (United Kingdom) Roy Allen, Boulogne-sur-Mer, Felixstowe, (2)
- (United Kingdom) David Davy, Ilkley, Leeds, (2)
- (United Kingdom) Wilfred Baddeley, **Wimbledon Championships** (1)

69 others players won 1 title each.

== See also ==
- 1891 women's tennis season

== Sources ==
- Wright & Ditson's Lawn Tennis Guide 1892
- 1891 Tournament Search Tennis Archives. Netherlands.
