= Tom Campion =

Tom Campion may refer to:

- Tom Campion, co-founder of American clothing store Zumiez
- Tom Campion (tennis), Irish-born tennis player and physician
- T. J. Campion, American football player

== See also ==
- Thomas Campion, English composer, poet, and physician
