= Tom Campion (tennis) =

Irish athlete and physician (1860–1907)

- Full name: Thomas Spread Campion
- Country (sports): Ireland
- Born: 9 September 1860; Lucan, County Dublin, Ireland
- Died: 19 November 1907 (age 47); Celbridge, County Kildare, Ireland
- Turned pro: 1883 (amateur tour)
- Retired: 1889

Singles
- Career record: 60–28
- Career titles: 6

Grand Slam singles results
- Wimbledon: 2R (1889)

Doubles

Grand Slam doubles results
- Wimbledon: QF (1888)

Thomas Spread Campion (9 September 1860 – 19 November 1907) was an Irish born tennis player and physician. He was a quarter finalist at the Wimbledon Championships in the men's doubles event in 1888. He was active from 1883 to 1889 and won 6 career singles titles.

== Career ==
Thomas Campion was born on 9 September 1860 in Lucan, County Dublin, Ireland. He played his first tournament at the Dublin University Championships in 1883 where he reached the final and won the tournament against Charles Chaytor. He competed at the Wimbledon Championships two times between 1888 and 1889. In the men's singles events his best result was reaching the second round in 1889 where he lost to the English player Ernest Wool Lewis. He was more successful in the men's doubles reaching the quarter finals in 1888 partnering with Harry Grove where they lost Ernest Renshaw and William Renshaw.

His best results in the other major tournaments of the 19th century came at Irish Championships in 1886 where he reached the quarter finals in the men's singles losing to Willoughby Hamilton, and at the Northern Championships in 1888 where he reached the quarter finals before losing to Ernest George Meers. His main career singles highlights include winning the Derbyshire Championships played on grass three times consecutivley (1886–1888), and the Dublin University Championships three times played on hard asphalt courts (1883, 1885, 1888). He played his last singles tournament at the Wimbledon Championships in 1889. Campion died on 19 November 1907 at Dún Laoghaire, County Dublin, Ireland, aged 77.

== Career finals ==
Notes: All Comers Finalist where indicated by (*).

=== Singles: 13 (6 titles, 7 runners-up) ===
Category + (Titles)
Major (0)
National (0)
International (0)
Regional (0)
County (3)
Regular (3)

Titles by Surface
Clay – Outdoor (0)
Grass – Outdoor (3)
Hard – Outdoor (3)
Wood – Indoor (0)

Outcome	No.	Date	Tournament	Location	Surface	Opponent	Score
Winner	1.	1883	Dublin University Championships	Dublin	Asphalt	(Ireland) Charles Henry Chaytor	5–7, 6–1, 7–5
Runner-up	1.	1884	South of Ireland Championships *	Limerick	Grass	(Ireland) Eyre Chatterton	1–6, 2–6, 1–6
Winner	2.	1885	Dublin University Championships	Dublin	Asphalt	(Ireland) Charles Henry Chaytor	5–7, 6–1, 7–5, 6–1
Runner-up	2.	1885	South of Ireland Championships *	Limerick	Grass	(Ireland) Willoughby Hamilton	5–7, 1–6, 5–7
Winner	3.	1886	Derbyshire Championships	Buxton	Grass	(United Kingdom) Percy Bateman Brown	5–7, 6–2, 6–1, 9–7
Runner-up	3.	1887	County Dublin Championships	Dublin	Grass	(Ireland) Willoughby Hamilton	6–8, 2–6, 2–6
Runner-up	4.	1887	Dublin University Championships	Dublin	Asphalt	(Ireland) Manliffe Francis Goodbody	6–2, 3–6, 1–6, 0–6
Winner	4.	1887	Derbyshire Championships	Buxton	Grass	(Ireland) William Drumond Hamilton	6–2, 6–3, 6–4
Runner-up	5.	1887	Leicester Open Lawn Tennis Tournament	Leicester	Grass	(United Kingdom) Ernest Wool Lewis	3–6, 3–6, 3–6
Runner-up	6.	1888	Fitzwilliam Club Championships	Dublin	Grass	(Ireland) Willoughby Hamilton	4–6, 3–6, 1–6
Winner	5.	1888	Derbyshire Championships	Buxton	Grass	(United Kingdom) Percy Bateman Brown	7–5, 6–4, 7–5
Winner	6.	1888	Dublin University Championships	Dublin	Asphalt	(Ireland) Harold Segerson Mahony	6–4, 6–4, 6–2
Runner-up	7.	1889	Fitzwilliam Club Championships *	Dublin	Grass	(Ireland) Hume Riversdale Jones	6–4, 2–6, 4–6, 3–6

== Education and career ==
Campion was educated at Trinity College Dublin, where he was a medical student. On graduating, Campion became a Licentiate of the Royal College of Physicians in Ireland (L.R.C.P.I.), and Licentiate in Medicine (L.M.) in 1887. He was a Fellow of the Royal Academy of Medicine; and a Member of the British Medical Association. He later worked as surgeon for the Orient Line, Pacific Steam Navigation Company, and Allan Line Royal Mail Steamers Company.

== Family ==
Campion was the son of Serjeant Campion (1813-1907) of County Cork and later a Queen's Counsel (Q.C.), Serjeant-at-Law and Professor of English Law at Queen's College, Galway; and Martha Campion (née Wilson; 1828–72), from County Cork. Tom married Jane Irene Lambert Tymons (1862-1909), from Dublin, on 2 December 1889 in Saint Matthias's Church.
