= Rochester Open =

Defunct tennis tournament
- Founded: 1881
- Abolished: 1924
- Location: The Paddock, King's School, Rochester, Kent, England
- Venue: Paddock Lawn Tennis Club
- Surface: Grass

The Rochester Open was a men's and women's grass court tennis tournament founded in 1881 as the Paddock LTC Open. It was organised by the Paddock Lawn Tennis Club, and played at The Paddock, King's School, Rochester, Kent, England. The tournament ran till 1924.

== History ==
The Rochester Open tournament was founded in 1881. The tournament was organised by the Paddock Lawn Tennis Club, and was played at The Paddock, King's School, Rochester, Kent, England until 1924. The Paddock is the cricket square for King's School Rochester.

== Location ==
Rochester is a town in Medway, in Kent, England. It is located about 30 miles (50 km) from London. The town forms a conurbation with neighbouring towns Chatham, Rainham, Strood and Gillingham.

== Finals ==
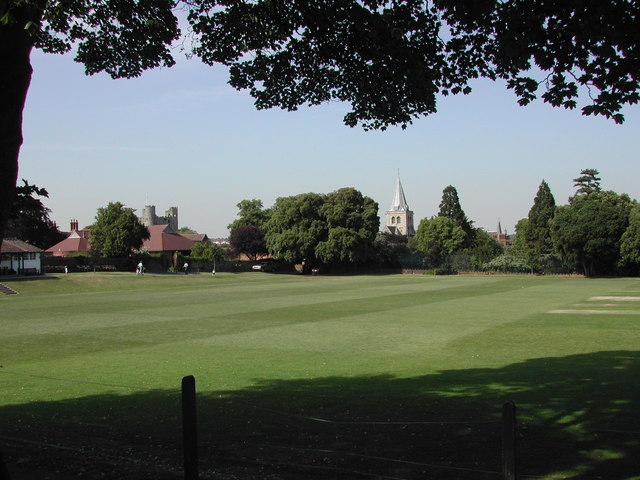
The Paddock, King's School Rochester where this event was staged

=== Men's singles ===
(Incomplete roll)

Year	Winners	Runners-up	Score
1881	(United Kingdom) H. Blatherwick	?	?
1882	(United Kingdom) A. Buchanan	(United Kingdom) E. Welchman	6-1, 6–4, 6-0
1885	(United Kingdom) C.C.J. Perry	(United Kingdom) E.M. Lachlan	6-1, 6–2, 3–6, 6-2
1886	(United Kingdom) David Elgar Payn	(United Kingdom) Alfred E. Walker	8–4, 6–4, 6-3
1887	(United Kingdom) Charles Gladstone Eames	(United Kingdom) Harry T. Shapley	6-2, 6-2
1888	(United Kingdom) Charles Gladstone Eames (2)	(United Kingdom) Wilfred Baddeley	6-3, 6-4
1893	(United Kingdom) Wilberforce Eaves	(United Kingdom) Roy Allen	7-5, 4–6, 6-3
1894	(United Kingdom) Wilberforce Eaves (2)	(United Kingdom) Oscar William Benwell	6-2, 6-1
1905	(United Kingdom) Nigel George Davidson	(United Kingdom) Charles Gladstone Eames	9-7, 6-2
1908	(United Kingdom) William Alfred Ingram	(United Kingdom) Allan Campbell Pearson	6-3, 11-9
1909	(United Kingdom) Roderick James McNair	(United Kingdom) D.H. Lindsay	6-0, 6-2
1910	(United Kingdom) Evan Horace Lownds	(United Kingdom) R.P. Scott	5-7, 7–5, 6-2

=== Women's singles ===
(Incomplete roll)

Year	Winners	Runners-up	Score
1904	(United Kingdom) Mildred Coles	(United Kingdom) Mrs H. Paine	6-1 6-2
1905	(United Kingdom) Mildred Coles (2)	(United Kingdom) Mrs H. Paine	6-2 6-1
1906	(United Kingdom) Mildred Coles (3)	(United Kingdom) Mildred Brooksmith	6-4 7-5
1907	(United Kingdom) Mildred Coles (4)	(United Kingdom) Miss Stagg	6-3 6-1
1908	(United Kingdom) Mildred Brooksmith	(United Kingdom) Mrs H.E. Munro	6-3 6-0
1909	(United Kingdom) Winifred McNair	(United Kingdom) Mildred Coles	6-0 6-2
1910	(United Kingdom) Mildred Brooksmith (2)	(United Kingdom) Norah Lattey	6-1 6-2
1911	(United Kingdom) Mildred Brooksmith (3)	(United Kingdom) Miss Harrison	divided title
1912	(United Kingdom) Mrs Spoor	(United Kingdom) Norah Lattey	6-4 6-1
1913	(United Kingdom) Phyllis Carr Satterthwaite	(United Kingdom) B. Pennycuick	6-2 6-0
1914/1919	Not held (due to world war one)		
1920	(United Kingdom) M. Scott	(United Kingdom) E. Tighe	7-9 8-6 6-3
1921	(United Kingdom) Phyllis Carr Satterthwaite (2)	(United Kingdom) Mrs Graham	6-0 6-1
1922	(United Kingdom) Mildred Coles (5)	(United Kingdom) E. Tighe	8-6 6-2
1924	(United Kingdom) Mildred Coles (6)	(United Kingdom) Mrs E. Orde	6-1 6-3
