= Paris Pro Championships =

Defunct tennis tournament
- Tour: Pro Tennis Tour; NTL Pro Tour
- Founded: 1898; 127 years ago
- Abolished: 1968; 57 years ago
- Location: Paris, France
- Venue: Palais des Sports; Tennis Club de Paris; Stade Pierre de Coubertin
- Surface: Clay / outdoor Wood / indoor

The Paris Pro Championships was a professional tennis tournament first held in April 1898. Also called the NTL Paris Pro Championships. It was first played at the Tennis Club de Paris, Paris, France until 1968.

== History ==
The Paris Pro Championships were first held in March 1898 at the Tennis Club de Paris, Paris, France. This was the first known pro tournament to held, and inaugural winner of this Round Robin Event was Irish player Thomas P. Burke who won 2 out 2 matches, Irish player George James Kerr was placed second with a 1-1 match record. The tournament was not held on a semi permanent basis, until the late 1960s, 1960s.

== Finals ==
Year	Champions	Runners-up	Score
1898	(Ireland) Thomas Burke (1st)	(Ireland) George J. Kerr (2nd)	Round Robin.
1952	(Ecuador) Pancho Segura (1st)	(United States) Jack Kramer (2nd)	Round Robin.
1953 (Note: In 1953, from Saturday November 21 to Sunday November 22, a 4-man (Sedgman winner, Gonzales runner-up, Segura 3rd and Budge 4th) professional tournament was held in Paris on indoor red cement at the Palais des Sports but there is no mention that this tournament was a French Pro: in particular in the January 1954 edition of Tennis de France, the French magazine, run by Philippe Chatrier (future president of the ILTF) who made the report of this tournament by interviewing the winner Frank Sedgman. Joe McCauley included this tournament in his list of French Pro tournaments but in the precis to his book History of Professional Tennis he mentions that it may not have been considered at the time as an official French Pro, more likely the Paris Pro.)	(Australia) Frank Sedgman	(United States) Pancho Gonzales	3–6, 6–3, 6–1, 6–1.
1967	(Australia) Rod Laver	(Australia) Ken Rosewall	6–0, 10–8, 10–8.
1968	(Australia) Ken Rosewall	(Spain) Andrés Gimeno	6–3, 6–4.

== Event names ==
- Paris Professional Championship (1898)
- Paris Professional Tennis Championships (1952-1953)
- Paris Pro Championships (1967)
- NTL Paris Pro Championships (1968)
