= Kebo Valley Open =

Defunct tennis tournament
- Tour: USNLTA Circuit
- Founded: 1890; 135 years ago
- Abolished: 1916; 109 years ago
- Location: Bar Harbor, Maine, United States
- Venue: Kebo Valley Golf Club
- Surface: Grass

The Kebo Valley Open was men's and women's grass court tennis tournament founded in 1890. It was played at the Kebo Valley Club in Bar Harbor, Maine, United States. The tournament was staged annually until at least 1916.

== History ==
The Kebo Valley Club was founded in 1888 by Charles T. How and DeGrasse Fox. In 1889 the club officially opened, with the surrounding land held a race track, tennis and croquet lawns, and a baseball field. There was no golf course built until 1892. In 1890 the club initiated an open tennis tournament, with the singles won by Valentine Gill Hall. In 1900 Henry Lane Eno donated a silver cup called the Henry Lane Eno Cup for winners of the men's singles. The tournament was staged annually until at least 1916 when it was discontinued.

== Finals ==
=== Men's Singles ===
(Incomplete roll)

Year	Winner	Runner-up	Score
1890	(United States) Valentine Gill Hall	(United States) Edward Ludlow Hall	6–3, 5–7, 8–6, 6–4.
1892	(United States) Bob Wrenn	(United States) Edward Ludlow Hall	4–6, 6–3, 6–3, 6–4.
1893	(United States) Valentine Gill Hall	(United States) Gregory Seeley Bryan	10–8, 6–4, 6–3.
1908	(United States) Stanley W. Pearson	(United States) Harold Hackett	8–6, 3–6, 6–3.

=== Women's Singles ===
(Incomplete roll)

Year	Winner	Runner-up	Score
1893	(United States) Miss Goodfellow	(United States) Miss Gibson	6–2 6–1 6–2.
