= East of Ireland Tennis Championships =

Tournament information
- Founded: 1885; 140 years ago
- Location: Dublin; Ireland
- Venue: Howth Lawn Tennis Club (1885-1889); Pavilion Grounds (1904-1914); Mount Temple Lawn Tennis Club (1919-1924); Lansdowne Lawn Tennis Club (1935-current)
- Surface: Grass Court/Hard Court
- Website: https://lansdowneltc.com/

The East of Ireland Tennis Championships originally known as the East of Ireland Championships is a combined men's and women's grass court tennis tournament founded in 1885. The first championships was played at the Howth Lawn Tennis Club, Howth, Dublin, County Dublin, Ireland. The tournament ran as a senior international tour event until 1979. The championships are still being played today.

== History ==
The first staging of the East of Ireland Championships were first held in 1885 at the Howth Lawn Tennis Club in Howth, Dublin, County Dublin, Ireland through until 1889 when it ended. In 1904 the championships were revived but by this time had been moved to the 1904 Pavilion Grounds, Kingstown, Ireland until 1914. The tournament was not held during World War One.

Following the First World War the venue was changed to the Mount Temple Lawn Tennis Club at Dartry, a suburb of south Dublin until 1924 (though it was not staged in 1921). The East of Ireland Championships were not held again until 1935 when it found a permanent home at the Lansdowne Lawn Tennis Club, Londonbridge Road, Sandymount, Dublin. where it continued to be held as a senior tour event until 1979. Throughout the mid to late 1980s it was known as the Heineken East of Ireland championships for sponsorship reasons.

The tournament was usually held later in July or August, however from 1935 it had moved to start of June. Grass courts was the initial surface for this tournament. The East of Ireland Tennis Championships are still being held annually today, the current playing surface are hard courts.

Former notable winners of the championship includes Willoughby Hamilton (IRE), George McVeagh (IRE), Heraldo Weiss (ARG), Sidney Schwartz (USA), Don Black (RHO) Hilda Wallis (IRE) and Betty Lombard (IRE) and Anna-Giulia Remondina (ITA).

== Sources ==
- Moore, Ronnine, (Friday 16 June 1950) The Irish Independent. Dublin, Ireland.
- Lansdowne LTC (2022). Dublin, Ireland.
- Irish Examiner. (13 August 2004). Dublin, Ireland.
- Sunday Tribune. (1987) Dublin, Ireland: Tribune Newspapers PLC.
- The Irish Times (Wednesday 21 August 1907). Dublin, Ireland.
