= George J. Kerr =

George Kerr
- Full name: George James Kerr
- Country (sports): Ireland
- Born: 25 December 1867 County Kildare, Ireland
- Died: 21 March 1954 (aged 86) Norristown, Pennsylvania, United States
- Turned pro: 1887 (1885 amateur)
- Retired: 1920

George James Kerr (25 December 1867 - 21 March 1954) was an Irish amateur then later professional lawn tennis player, and tennis coach. He twice won the World Professional Championship in 1889 and 1890 both times against Tom Pettitt.

== Career ==
Amateur

Kerr played his first amateur tournament the Edinburgh University LTC Open in 1885 where he reached the semi finals before losing to Herbert Bowes-Lyon.

Professional

Kerr turned professional in 1887. In 1889 he took part in series of four head to head matches against Tom Pettitt between 29 August and 2 October for the World Pro Championship title he won the series four matches to zero.

In June 1890 a second World Championship head to head series to determine the World Pro Champion was held in Dublin, Ireland. Kerr retained the title again by defeating Pettitt three matches to zero.

In 1898 he competed at the Paris Pro Championships at the Tennis Club de Paris, Paris, France a round robin event where he was placed second behind Thomas Burke.

In 1920 he took part in the Bristol Cup in Beaulieu-sur-Mer, France where he reached the quarter finals but was beaten by Albert Burke.

Amateur Pro Challenge Matches

Kerr was challenged in head to head matches against the best amateurs players he had wins over Ernest Renshaw, Harry S. Barlow, Ernest Wool Lewis and Harold Mahony and went undefeated from 1890 until 1899.

Olympics

In 1900 he took part in special non medal professional round robin tournament at the Paris Olympics featuring six players where he placed second behind Thomas Burke.

== Coaching ==
Kerr was the resident professional lawn tennis player at the Fitzwilliam Lawn Tennis Club and coached a number of players including Willoughby Hamilton, and Louisa Martin.

In 1900 Kerr moved Berlin, Germany and became the resident professional at the Rot-Weiss Tennis Club.

== Personal ==
Kerr was born in County Kildare in Ireland, and died in March 1954 at Gwynllam Farm in Norristown, Pennsylvania United States.

== Sources ==
- Coaching-Professionals Eaves, SJ, Lake, RJ and Cowdrey, S (2016) The 'Ghosts' of Lawn Tennis Past: Exploring the Forgotten Lives of Early Working- Class Coaching-Professionals. Sport in History, 36 (4). Manchester Metropolitan University. Manchester. England. ISSN 1746-0271
