= Chingford Open =

Defunct tennis tournament
- Tour: LTA Circuit
- Founded: 1888; 137 years ago
- Abolished: 1892; 133 years ago
- Location: Chingford, Essex, England
- Venue: Connaught Club
- Surface: Clay

The Chingford Open or Chingford Open Championships and also called the Connaught Open Lawn Tennis Tournament, was a men's clay court tennis tournament founded in 1888. The tournament was organised by the Connaught Club and played in Chingford, Essex, England and was held annually until 1892 as part of the LTA Circuit when it was discontinued.

== History ==
The Connaught Club was originally founded as a tennis and croquet club in 1885 as part of the facilities of the Royal Forest Hotel in what was then Essex (now London). In November 1888 the club had just opened its new hard courts (clay) and staged the first edition of the Chingford Open, The men's singles final was supposed to be between Herbert Chipp and Ernest George Meers but he withdrew before the final, Ernest Wool Lewis who lost in the all comers final took his place Meers won the title in three sets. The event (though separate) was held in conjunction with the Essex Championships for the years 1888 and 1889, and was co-valid as that event in 1891. The final edition was held in 1892 with the winner of the men's singles being Arthur Gore.

== Finals ==
=== Men's singles ===
(incomplete roll)

Year	Winners	Runners-up	Score
1888	(United Kingdom) Ernest Meers	(England) Ernest Wool Lewis	6–3, 3–6 6–3.
1889	(England) Charles G. Eames	(England) Arthur St-Leger Fagan	6–2, 6–2, 6–4.
1890	(England) Arthur Gore	(England) Charles G. Eames	3–6, 6–3, 7–5, 4–6, 6–3.
1891	(England) Arthur Gore (2)	(England) Charles G. Eames	10–12, 2–6, 6–2, 6–3, 6–3.
1892	(England) Arthur Gore (3)	(England) Charles G. Eames	6–4, 6–2, 6–1.

== See also ==
- Connaught Hard Court Championships held at the Connught Club (1951–1974)
- Essex Championships held at the Connught Club (1888–1889, 1892–1893)
