= Anglo Dutch Open =

Defunct tennis tournament
- Founded: 1885; 140 years ago
- Abolished: 1947; 78 years ago
- Location: Rotterdam, South Holland, Netherlands
- Venue: Anglo Dutch Lawn Tennis Club
- Surface: Hard

The Anglo Dutch Open was a men's and women's hard court tennis tournament founded in 1887 as the Anglo Dutch Tournament The tournament was organised by the Anglo Dutch Lawn Tennis Club and was played in Rotterdam, South Holland, Netherlands. It was held annually until 1947 when it was discontinued.

== History ==
In 1885 the Anglo Dutch Lawn Tennis Club was founded. The event was organised by the English Dutch Lawn-Tennis Association and played at the Anglo Dutch Lawn Tennis Club. The founders of the association and club were H. Turing, then Vice-Consul of England, and his acquaintances including Allan, Furnis, Smith Livingstone, Parker, Robert Laming and John Bonke. The tournament was held annually until 1947 when it was discontinued.
