= Waterbury Cup Invitation =

Defunct tennis tournament
- Tour: USNLTA Circuit (1889-90)
- Founded: 1889; 137 years ago
- Abolished: 1890; 136 years ago
- Location: Harrison, New York, United States
- Venue: Westchester Country Club
- Surface: Grass

The Waterbury Cup Invitation was a mens USNLTA affiliated grass court tournament founded in 1889. It was played at the Westchester Country Club, Harrison, New York in the United States until 1890.

== Finals ==
=== Singles ===
Year	Winners	Runners-up	Score
1889	(United States) Howard A. Taylor	(United States) Henry Slocum	def.
1890	(United States) Howard A. Taylor (2)	(United States) Charles Sands	6-1, 6-1, 6-2
