= Montclair Open =

Defunct tennis tournament
- Founded: 1882; 144 years ago
- Abolished: 1904; 122 years ago
- Location: Montclair, New Jersey, United States
- Venue: Montclair Lawn Tennis Club (1882-1892); Montclair Athletic Club (1897-1904)
- Surface: Clay (1882–1885); Grass (1886); Clay (1887–1891); Grass (1897–1904)

The Montclair Open was a tennis tournament first established in 1882 at Montclair, New Jersey, United States that ran until 1904.

== History ==
The Montclair Open was a tennis tournament first established in 1882 by the Montclair Lawn Tennis Club (formally incorporated in 1885), Montclair, New Jersey, United States. The tournament ran until 1892. In 1893 the tennis clubs land at Fullerton Avenue was given over to redevelopment thus ending the tournament.

By 1897 tennis activity in the township had shifted toward the Montclair Athletic Club (MAC), which was becoming the dominant multi sport venue in the area, revived the event at its Valley Road grounds. It continued to be staged through till 1904.

Notable winners of the men's singles title included; Henry Slocum, Howard Augustus Taylor, Clarence Hobart, Edward L. Hall, and Otto Hinck.

== Past finals ==
=== Singles ===
(incomplete roll)

| Year | Winner | Runner-up | Score |
|---|---|---|---|
| 1882 | (United States) Edward Taylor | (United States) Albert Hamlin | 6–3, 6–2, 6–3 |
| 1886 | (United States) Howard Taylor | (United States) Albert Hamlin | 6–3, 6–2, 6–3 |
| 1888 | (United States) Clarence Hobart | (United States) Rodman Beach | 4–6, 6–3, 6–4, 7–5 |
| 1889 | (United States) Clarence Hobart (2) | (United States) Deane Miller | 10–8, 12–14, 6–3 |
| 1890 | (United States) Edward L. Hall | (United States) Russell Perkins | 6–3, 7–5, 6–4 |
| 1891 | (United States) Bill Larned | (United States) Stephen Millett | 4–6, 6–1, 3–6, 8–6, 6–1 |
| 1897 | (United States) Otto Hinck | (United States) J. Parmly Paret | 6–4, 7–5, 8–6 |
| 1898 | (United States) Otto Hinck (2) | (United States) Edward Pell | 6–2, 6–3, 6–1 |
| 1899 | (United States) Otto Hinck (3) | (United States) Calhoun C. Cragin | 6–4, 6–2, 6–4 |
| 1900 | (United States) Otto Hinck (4) | (United States) John Neely | 6–1, 6–3, 6–2 |
| 1901 | (United States) Otto Hinck (5) | (United States) Fred Alexander | 6–3, 6–4, 8–6 |
| 1902 | (United States) Otto Hinck (6) | (United States) Edwin Fischer | 6–3, 6–1, 4–6, 6–4 |
| 1903 | (United States) Otto Hinck (7) | (United States) S. Howard Voshell | 6–2, 6–4, 6–2 |
| 1904 | (United States) Otto Hinck (8) | (United States) Wylie Grant | 6–1, 6–4, 6–2 |
