= Dublin University Championships =

Defunct tennis tournament
- Founded: 1877
- Abolished: 1909
- Location: Dublin University LTC; Trinity College; Dublin; Ireland
- Surface: Hard

The Dublin University Championships was a men's hard court tennis tournament held from 1877 through 1909.

== History ==
The Dublin University Championships was played at the Dublin University Lawn Tennis Club, Trinity College, Ireland initially played on outdoor hard asphalt courts from 1877 to 1891, then switched grass courts. There were eighteen editions of the event.

== Finals ==
Incomplete list of tournaments included:

=== Men's singles ===
Year	Champion	Runner up	Score
1877	(Ireland) Richard Manders	(Ireland) George Henry Shannon	?
1878	(Ireland) James Jackson	(Ireland) William Morgan Jellett	?
1879	(Ireland) Henry James Daly	(Ireland) Ernest Edward Knox	?
1883	(Ireland) Tom Campion	(Ireland) Charles Henry Chaytor	5-7 6-1 7-5
1885	(Ireland) Tom Campion	(Ireland) Charles Henry Chaytor	5-7 6-1 7-5 6-1
1886	(Ireland) Eyre Chatterton	(Ireland) Grainger Chaytor	6-3 6-4 6-0
1887	(Ireland) Manliffe Goodbody	(Ireland) Tom Campion	2-6 6-3 6-1 6-0
1889	(Ireland) Harold Mahony	(Ireland) Hume Riversdale Jones	8-6 6-2 8-6
1890	(Ireland) Grainger Chaytor	(Ireland) Harold Mahony	6-3 3-6 8-6 6-1
1891	(Ireland) Thomas Chaytor	(Ireland) Arthur Henry Ashe	6-2 6-1 6-3
1893	(Ireland) T. Waller	(Ireland) Tom Chaytor	w.o.
1902	(Ireland) James Cecil Parke	(Ireland) John Frederick Graham	6-3 10-8 6-2
1903	(Ireland) James Cecil Parke	(Ireland) Henry Vere Shirley Dillon	6-1 6-4 6-3
1904	(Ireland) James Cecil Parke	(Ireland) Henry Vere Shirley Dillon	6-3 4-6 6-3 4-6 6-1
1905	(Ireland) Henry Vere Shirley Dillon	(Ireland) James Cecil Parke	6-4 6-1 8-6
1906	(Ireland) Henry Vere Shirley Dillon	(Ireland) Henry Alan Page	6-4 7-5 1-6 6-1
1908	(Ireland) Arthur Meagher Cave	(Ireland) Charles Frederick Scroope	6-4 6-2 6-1
1909	(Ireland) Charles Frederick Scroope	(United Kingdom) Arthur Davies Tuckey	6-4 6-1 6-1
