= Market Harborough Open Championship =

Defunct tennis tournament
- Tour: LTA Circuit
- Founded: 1889; 136 years ago
- Abolished: 1909; 116 years ago
- Location: Market Harborough, Leicestershire, England
- Venue: Market Harborough LTC
- Surface: Grass

The Market Harborough Open Championship also known as the Market Harborough Open was men's and women's grass court tennis tournament founded in 1889, as the Market Harborough Lawn Tennis Tournament. It was played at the Market Harborough Lawn Tennis Club, Market Harborough, Leicestershire, England. The tournament was staged annually until at least 1909.

== History ==
In 1889 the Market Harborough Lawn Tennis Tournament was established. Market Harborough was a popular holiday destination during the 19th century, which led to the initial success and patronage of this tournament. By the beginning of the 20th century the tournament was known as the Market Harborough Open Championship. In 1909 the tournament was eventually cancelled due to lack of financial support that had started as early as 1902.

== Finals ==
=== Men's Singles ===
(Incomplete roll) * denotes challenger in the challenge round stage.

| Year | Winner | Runner-up | Score |
|---|---|---|---|
| 1889 | (United Kingdom) Frank Noon | (United Kingdom) Ernest Crawley * | 6–4, 6–3, 6–4. |
| 1890 | (United Kingdom) Frank Noon | (United Kingdom) Ernest Crawley * | 6–4, 6–3, 6–2. |
| 1891* | (United Kingdom) Charles Sidney Viccars | (United Kingdom) Frank Noon | w.o. |
| 1903 | (United Kingdom) Frank Riseley | (United Kingdom) William Taylor | 8–6, 3–6, 6–3. |

=== Women's singles ===
(incomplete roll)

| Year | Winners | Runners-up | Score |
|---|---|---|---|
| 1890 | (England) Kate Nunneley | (England) Agnes Noon Watts | 6–2, 8–6 |
