= Joy Marshall =

New Zealand Anglican clergyman and sportsman

Personal information
- Full name: Joy Marriott Marshall
- Born: 23 January 1867; Ixworth, Suffolk, England
- Died: 2 September 1903 (aged 36); Christchurch, New Zealand
- Height: 5 ft 10 in (1.78 m)
- Role: Wicketkeeper-batsman
- Relatives: John Marshall (father); Patrick Marshall (brother)

Domestic team information
- Years: Team
- 1891–92: Taranaki

Career statistics
Competition	First-class
Matches	1
Runs scored	20
Batting average	10.00
100s/50s	0/0
Top score	19
Balls bowled	0
Wickets	–
Bowling average	–
5 wickets in innings	–
10 wickets in match	–
Best bowling	–
Catches/stumpings	0/0
- Source: Cricinfo, 18 May 2019

The Rev. Joy Marriott Marshall (23 January 1867 – 2 September 1903) was a New Zealand Anglican clergyman and school teacher who was also a prominent tennis player, rugby footballer and cricketer.

== Early life and clerical career ==
Joy Marshall was born in Ixworth, Suffolk, England, in 1867, one of the sons of the Rev. John Hannath Marshall and his wife Emily (née Rogers). The family moved to New Zealand in 1876 for the Rev. Marshall's health, as he was suffering from tuberculosis, and settled in Kaiteriteri, near Nelson. He died there in 1879.

After some time at schools in England, Joy Marshall completed his schooling at Wanganui Collegiate School from 1883 to 1885, then attended Canterbury University College in Christchurch, where he earned a Master of Arts degree in Mathematics and Classics in 1890. From January 1892 to April 1894 he was an assistant master at Christ's College, Christchurch. He studied Mathematics for a year at St John's College, Cambridge, in 1894–95. He then returned to New Zealand, settling in Wanganui, and was ordained a deacon in Wellington in 1897. He was chaplain at Wanganui Collegiate School from 1897 until his death in 1903 and also served as first assistant master.

== Sporting career ==
=== Tennis ===
After studying the Badminton Library volume on tennis in 1890 and practising assiduously, Marshall was able to introduce the forehand drive to New Zealand tennis at the national championships in 1890–91. He won the New Zealand men's singles title in a straight-sets victory over Minden Fenwicke, 6–3, 6–4, 10–8. He also won the championship in 1896–97, again in straight sets, 8–6, 6–2, 8–6, over James Hooper, when "the spectators enjoyed as fine an exhibition of clever tennis playing as they could wish for". He won the men's doubles with his brother Patrick in 1893–94, when he was also runner-up in the singles to James Hooper, 5–7, 3–6, 7–5, 4–6.

=== Cricket ===
In his only first-class cricket match, Marshall was Taranaki’s top-scorer with 19 and 1 when they made 70 and 39 and lost by 10 wickets to Hawke's Bay in 1891-92. He made 26 and 50 (the top score) when Wanganui lost by an innings to Hawke's Bay in a non-first-class match in 1898-99.

In 1895, shortly after he arrived in Wanganui, Marshall was the chief organiser behind the formation of the Wanganui Cricket Association.

When the English touring team played a Wanganui XV on 3 and 5 January 1903, Marshall scored 13 and 19 as Wanganui were defeated by eight wickets. It was a low-scoring match, in which 42 wickets fell for 396 runs. Marshall won a bat for being Wanganui’s highest scorer in the match. As the secretary of the Wanganui Cricket Association, Marshall organised an exhibition match in Wanganui on 6 January between an English XII and a Wanganui XIII. In three and a half hours 499 runs were scored: the English team made 290 for 9 declared off 41 overs, and Wanganui replied with 209 for 2 off 34 overs. Marshall himself scored 109 not out with 19 fours, and he and his brother George put on 202 in an hour and a half. According to a local paper the English cricketers praised Marshall’s batting and said he should be picked in the New Zealand team. Pelham Warner, captain of the English touring team, later wrote in his account of the tour that Marshall was one of the best all-round cricketers in New Zealand.

=== Rugby ===
Marshall represented Canterbury College at rugby football as centre three-quarter from 1888 to 1890, when he was "a fine kick, a deadly tackle, and a clever but unselfish scorer". He also represented Canterbury and Wanganui in inter-provincial matches. At the time of his death he was a vice-president of the Wanganui Rugby Union.

== Death ==
Despite his athletic prowess, Marshall suffered from ill-health. He collapsed while playing in the 1889 national tennis championships and was incapacitated for several weeks. He was thought to have a weak heart as he had fainted several times. In 1903 he suffered an attack of rheumatic fever and was hospitalised for several weeks. He was also thought to be suffering from exhaustion owing to over-work.

Marshall was in low spirits in September 1903 when he was staying with a friend in Christchurch, where he was to meet the Wanganui Collegiate football team for some inter-school matches. On the morning of 2 September he left his friend's house to take a walk and disappeared. An extensive search was undertaken over nearly two weeks by police and a large number of volunteers. Students of Canterbury College were given a morning off lectures so they could join the search. His body was found on 15 September in the Heathcote River in the Christchurch suburb of Woolston, about a mile downstream from where he had been staying in Opawa. The inquest found that he had drowned, noted that there were no signs of violence, and made no finding as to the cause of drowning.
