= Auburndale Challenge Cup =

Aburndale Challenge Cup

Defunct tennis tournament
- Tour: USNLTA Circuit (1889-92)
- Founded: 1892; 133 years ago
- Abolished: 1890; 135 years ago
- Location: Auburndale, Massachusetts, United States
- Venue: Woodland Park Hotel
- Surface: Grass

The Aburndale Challenge Cup was a mens USNLTA affiliated grass court tennis tournament founded in 1889. Also known as the Partridge Cup, it was played at the Woodland Park Hotel, Auburndale, Massachusetts, United States until 1892.

== Finals ==
=== Singles ===
Year	Winners	Runners-up	Score
1889.	(United States) Fred S. Mansfield	(United States) Philip Sears	def.
1890	(United States) Fred Hovey	(United States) Fred S. Mansfield	def.
1891	(United States) Bob Wrenn	(United States) Fred Hovey	def.
1892	(United States) Malcolm G. Chace	(United States) Fred Hovey	6-2, 6-2, 3-6, 6-8, 8-6
