= M.C.C. Autumn Championship =

Defunct tennis tournament
- Event name: Victorian Grass Court Championships
- Founded: 1889
- Abolished: 1949
- Location: Melbourne, Australia
- Venue: Melbourne Cricket Club, Albert Ground
- Surface: Grass / outdoor

The M.C.C. Autumn Championship was a combined grass court tennis tournament founded in 1889 as the Buckley Trophy by Irish born Australian businessman Mars Buckley. It was held annually at the MCC, Albert Cricket Ground, Melbourne, Victoria, Australia until 1949.

== History ==
The M.C.C. Autumn Championship was founded in 1889 as the Buckley Trophy by Irish-born Australian businessman Mars Buckley. Also known as the Victorian Grass Court Championships.

The event was the grass court equivalent to the Victorian Championships which from 1879 to 1895 was played on outdoor hard asphalt tennis courts.

In 1896 this event was rebranded under a new name, at which point the Victorian Championships switched to being a grass court tournament. The tournament ran annually through till 1949.

== Finals ==
=== Singles ===
(incomplete roll) include:

Year	Winners	Runners-up	Score
1889	(Australia) Arthur Colquhoun	(Australia) Norman Bayles	2-6, 6-2, 6-2, 6-4
1890	(Australia) Walter Riddell	(Australia) Norman Bayles	2-6, 8-6, 6-4
1891	(United Kingdom) Wilberforce Eaves	(Australia) Haworth Bartram	3-0 sets
1892	(Australia) Ben Greene	(Australia) Ulysses Brown	6-4, 6-3, 6-2
1893	(Australia) Gus Kearney	(Australia) Ben Greene	3-6, 0-6, 6-0, 6-1, 6-1
1894	(Australia) Ben Greene (2)	(Australia) Andrew L. Macfie	6-2, 6-2, 6-3
1895	(Australia) Ben Greene (3)	(Australia) Robert G. Bowen	6-2, 6-3, 8-6
1896	(Australia) Tom Tatchell	(Australia) Robert G. Bowen	5-7, 6-1, 6-1, 2-6, 6-4
1897	(Australia) Alfred Dunlop	(Australia) Tom Tatchell	3-6, 6-2, 6-2, 6-2
1898	(Australia) Gus Kearney (2)	(Australia) Thomas Irving	3-6, 6-3, 6-2, 6-3
1899	(Australia) Gus Kearney (3)	(Australia) Alfred Dunlop	7-5, 6-2, 6-2
1900	(Australia) Norman Brookes	(Australia) Alfred Dunlop	6-0, 6-4, 8-6
1912	(Australia) Arthur O'Hara Wood	(Australia) Alfred Dunlop	6-0, 6-4, 8-6
1914	(Australia) Horace Rice	(Australia) Rodney Heath	1-6, 6-3, 6-4, 6-2
1915	(Australia) Arthur O'Hara Wood (2)	(New Zealand) Harry Parker	6-2, 6-1, 6-2
1919	(Australia) Timothy Fitchet	(Australia) Rupert Wertheim	4-6, 10-8, 6-4, 6-3
1920	(Australia) Pat O'Hara Wood	(Australia) Ron Thomas	def. ?
1921	(Australia) Gerald Patterson	(Australia) Pat O'Hara Wood	6-2, 6-3, 6-2
1922	(Australia) Gerald Patterson (2)	(Australia) Jack Hawkes	6-1, 6-2, 8-6
1923	(Australia) Pat O'Hara Wood (2)	(Australia) Bob Schlesinger	6-0, 6-1, 3-6, 7-9, 6-2
1924	(Australia) Gerald Patterson (3)	(Australia) Pat O'Hara Wood	6-4, 2-6, 6-4, 6-2
1925	(Australia) Bob Schlesinger	(Australia) Pat O'Hara Wood	6-3, 6-0, 0-6, 6-1
1926	(Australia) Gerald Patterson (4)	(Australia) Bob Schlesinger	8-6, 6-2, 6-2
1927	(Australia) Pat O'Hara Wood (3)	(Australia) Edgar Moon	6-3, 3-6, 6-4, 6-4
1928	(Australia) Bob Schlesinger (2)	(Australia) Paul A. Haege	7-5, 6-4, 6-3
1929	(Australia) Jack Crawford	(Australia) Jim Willard	6-4, 8-6, 6-3
1930	(Australia) Bob Schlesinger (3)	(Australia) J. R. James MacGillicuddy	6-4, 6-2, 6-3
1931	(Australia) Harry Hopman	(Australia) Jack Clemenger	6-1, 6-4, 6-3
1932	(Australia) Harry Hopman (2)	(Australia) Vivian McGrath	10-12, 6-4, 7-5, 6-4
1933	(Australia) Harry Hopman (3)	(Australia) Vivian McGrath	4-6, 3-6, 8-6, 6-2, 9-7
1935	(Australia) Harry Hopman (4)	(Australia) Abel Kay	5-7, 6-3, 6-3, 6-3
1936	(Australia) Harry Hopman (5)	(Australia) Reg Ewin	6-3, 6-4, 6-2
1937	(Australia) Harry Hopman (6)	(Australia) Bert Tonkin	6-4, 6-4, 6-2
1938	(Australia) Harry Hopman (7)	(Australia) Abel Kay	10-12, 3-6, 6-3, 6-2, 6-2
1939	(Australia) Adrian Quist	(Australia) Harry Hopman	7-5, 7-5, 3-6, 7-5
1940	(Australia) Harry Hopman (8)	(Australia) Lionel Brodie	5-7, 6-2, 3-6, 6-3, 6-1
1947	(Australia) Dinny Pails	(Australia) Colin Long	7-5, 7-5, 8-6
1948	(Australia) Colin Long	(Australia) George Worthington	6-1, 6-3, 6-4
1949	(Australia) Mervyn Rose	(Australia) Harry Hopman	7-5, 3-6, 6-4, 7-5
