= Pollokshields Open =

Defunct tennis tournament
- Founded: 1886
- Abolished: 1898
- Location: Pollokshields; Scotland
- Venue: Pollockshields Athletic Club
- Surface: Grass

The Pollokshields Open was a combined grass court tennis tournament founded in 1886. The tournament was at times played alongside the West of Scotland Championships. It was played at the Pollokshields Athletic Club grounds, Pollokshields, Scotland until 1898.
