= Charles Gladstone Eames =

English tennis player

Charles Eames
- Full name: Charles Gladstone Robert Eames
- Country (sports): GBR
- Born: 19 December 1860 New Cross, London, England
- Died: 2 February 1943 (aged 82) Battersea, London, England
- Turned pro: 1886 (amateur tour)
- Retired: 1908

Singles
- Career record: 67–17
- Career titles: 8

Grand Slam singles results
- Wimbledon: 2R (1888)

Charles Gladstone Robert Eames (19 December 1860 – 2 February 1943) was an English tennis player who competed at the 1888 Wimbledon Championships. He was active from 1886 to 1908 and won 8 career singles titles.

== Career ==
Eames was born on 19 December 1860 in New Cross, London, England. He played his first tournament in 1886 at the Gore Court Championships in Sittingbourne where he reached the semi-finals. He won his first singles title in 1887 at the Stevenage Open Lawn Tennis Tournament.

In 1888 he took part in first Wimbledon Championships where he was defeated in the second round by Ernest Wool Lewis in straight sets. In 1907 he won his final singles title at the Exmouth Open. He played his final tournament at the Isle of Wight Championships at Ryde in 1908. Eames played tennis for twelve seasons between 1886 and 1908 where he contested seventeen finals, and won eight singles titles. He died in Battersea, London, England on 2 February 1943.

== Career finals ==
Notes: All Comers Finalist where indicated by (*).

=== Singles: 18 (8 titles, 10 runners-up) ===
Category + (Titles)
Major (0)
National (0)
Regional (0)
County (1)
Regular (7)

Titles by Surface
Clay – Outdoor (2)
Grass – Outdoor (6)
Hard – Outdoor (0)
Wood – Indoor (0)

Outcome	No.	Date	Tournament	Location	Surface	Opponent	Score
Won	1.	1887	Stevenage Open	Stevenage	Grass	(United Kingdom) W. Dunn	6–0 6–1
Won	2.	1887	Rochester Open	Rochester	Grass	(United Kingdom) Dr. Harry T. Shapley	6–2, 6–2
Loss	1.	1888	Kent Closed Championships	Charlton	Grass	(United Kingdom) Ernest George Meers	1–6, 3–6, 4–6
Won	3.	1888	Rochester Open (2)	Rochester	Grass	(United Kingdom) Wilfred Baddeley	6–3, 6–4
Loss	2.	1888	Acton Vale LTC Open	East Acton	Grass	(United Kingdom) Ernest George Meers	1–6, 1–6, 2–6
Won	4.	1888	Essex Championships	Chingford	Clay	(United Kingdom) F. O' Shaughnessy Belli Reade	6–3, 6–2
Loss	3.	1889	Kent Closed Championships	Charlton	Grass	(United Kingdom) Ernest George Meers	8–6, 8–6, 4–6, 3–6, 7–5
Won	5.	1889	Leamington Open Tournament	Leamington Spa	Grass	(United Kingdom) Francis Seymour Noon	4–6, 6–1, 6–2, 3–6, 7–5
Loss	4.	1889	London Championships	West Kensington	Grass	(United Kingdom) Ernest George Meers	8–6, 8–6, 4–6, 3–6, 5–7
Won	6.	1889	Leicester Open	Leicester	Grass	(Ireland) William Hamilton	7–5, 1–6, 10–8, 4–6, 6–2
Loss	5.	1889	Nottinghamshire Championships	Nottingham	Grass	(Ireland) William Hamilton	5–7, 6–3, 5–7, 6–2, 4–6
Loss	6.	1889	Kent Championships *	Beckenham	Grass	(United Kingdom) Harry Sibthorpe Barlow	5–7, 1–6, 1–6
Loss	7.	1890	Connaught Hard Court Championships	Beckenham	Clay	(United Kingdom) Arthur Gore	6–3, 3–6, 5–7, 6–3, 3–6
Won	7.	1890	New York Tennis Club Open	New York City	Clay	(United States) Carman Runyon	6–3, 6–2, 6–1
Loss	8.	1890	Amackassin Club Invitation	Yonkers	Clay	(United States) Victor Etling	5–7, 6–4, 5–7, 4–6
Loss	9.	1891	Essex Championships	Chingford	Clay	(United Kingdom) Arthur Gore	12–10, 6–2, 2–6, 3–6, 3–6
Loss	10.	1905	Rochester Open	Rochester	Grass	(United Kingdom) Nigel George Davidson	7–9, 2–6
Won	8.	1907	Exmouth Open	Exmouth	Grass	(United Kingdom) R.F.J. Harrison	6–2, 6–0

== Family ==
His son Cyril Gladstone Eames born (1890) was also a tennis player.
