= Taylor Challenge Cup =

Defunct tennis tournament
- Tour: LTA Circuit (1885-1892)
- Founded: 1885; 141 years ago
- Abolished: 1893; 133 years ago
- Location: Leeds (1885-91); Scarborough (1892-93)
- Venue: Headingley LTC; Scarborough LTC
- Surface: Grass

The Taylor Challenge Cup was men's grass court tennis tournament founded in 1885 as the Leeds Amalgamated Tournament. The tournament was first played in Headingley, Leeds, Yorkshire, England until 1887. In 1888 it was rebranded under a new name. In 1892 the event was moved to Scarborough, East Riding of Yorkshire until 1893.

== History ==
The Leeds Amalgamated Tournament was established in 1885 singles tournament, started in 1885 and was organised by Headingley LTC in Leeds, Yorkshire.

The initial event was open only to five local clubs but, in 1888, it was opened to all clubs affiliated to the Yorkshire LTA.

A local industrialist business man Tom Taylor the owner of the Clarence Iron and Steel Works in Leeds donated a 25-guinea trophy.

There were normally 10 to 15 entrants. The first trophy had been won outright by Ernest Fletcher – twice Yorkshire singles champion – with successive victories from 1885 to 1887. David Davy first entered in 1889 and beat Fletcher in the final.

The tournament ran until 1893 when it was last played in Scarborough, England that event was won by William Renshaw the seven time Wimbledon champion.

== Finals ==
=== Men's singles ===
(incomplete roll)

Year	Winners	Runners-up	Score
1888	(United Kingdom) Edward Fletcher	(United Kingdom) Gilbert Mahon	def?
1889	(United Kingdom) David Davy	(United Kingdom) Edward Fletcher	9-7, 7-5, 4-6, 6-3
1890	(United Kingdom) David Davy (2)	(United Kingdom) Fred Bradbury	def?
1891	(United Kingdom) David Davy (3)	(United Kingdom) Charles W. Wade	6-4, 7-5, 6-1
1892	(United Kingdom) Harry S. Barlow	(United Kingdom) Ernest Crawley	6-0, 6-3, 3-6, 6-1
1893	(United Kingdom) William Renshaw	(United Kingdom) Harry S. Barlow	6-3, 7-5, 6-3
