= Fitzwilliam Club Championships =

Defunct tennis tournament
- Tour: ILTF
- Founded: 1884; 141 years ago
- Abolished: 2003; 22 years ago
- Location: Dublin, Ireland.
- Venue: Fitzwilliam Lawn Tennis Club
- Surface: Grass- outdoors

The Fitzwilliam Club Championships also known as the Fitzwilliam Club Tennis Championships was a combined men's and women's grass court tennis tournament founded in 1884. The championship was an open club event organised by the Fitzwilliam Lawn Tennis Club, Dublin, Ireland. The tournament ran until 2003.

== History ==
The Fitzwilliam Club Championships were established in 1884 as an open all comers club championship for Irish players. The tournament was continually staged until 2003.

Notable winners of the men's singles title included; Ernest Browne, Willoughby Hamilton, Grainger Chaytor, Valentine Miley, Tom Chaytor, Walter Herbert Boyd, Herbert Knox McKay, and James Pringle
