= Willoughby Hamilton =

Irish tennis and badminton player

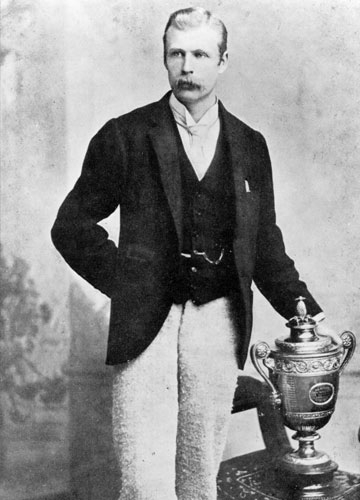
- Full name: James Willoughby Hamilton
- Born: 9 December 1864 Monasterevin, County Kildare, Ireland
- Died: 27 September 1943 (aged 78) Dublin, County Dublin, Ireland
- Height: 1.75 m (5 ft 9 in)
- Turned pro: 1884 (amateur)
- Retired: 1899

Singles
- Career record: 79–13 (85.8%)
- Career titles: 29

Grand Slam singles results
- Wimbledon: W (1890)

James Willoughby Hamilton; (9 December 1864 – 27 September 1943) was a co-world No. 1 Irish male tennis player, a footballer and international badminton player.

== Tennis career ==
Hamilton played his first tournament at the 1884 Irish Championships where he reached the quarter finals stage, before losing to Herbert Knox McKay. His significant major title wins include the Northern Championships (1888, 1889), and the Irish Championships (1889). In the latter tournament he defeated the six-time Wimbledon champion William Renshaw in the all-comers final and then went on to defeat his brother Ernest Renshaw in the challenge round. This made him one of the favorites for the 1889 Wimbledon title but he suffered a five set defeat in the semifinal against Harry S. Barlow.

For the span 1889–90, Hamilton was ranked by many as the best tennis player in the world. Hamilton did not defend his Wimbledon title in the 1891 challenge round. He won the Gentlemen's Singles title at the 1890 Wimbledon Championships, defeating William Renshaw in five sets, and becoming the first Irish player to win the tournament. The previous year, he had won both the Northern Championships and the Irish Championships.

His other career singles titles highlights include winning the Fitzwilliam Club Championships five times (1886–1890), the East of Ireland Championships at Howth four times (1886–1889), the Welsh Championships three times (1888–1890), the West of Ireland Championships three times (1885–1886, 1888), the South of Ireland Championships two times (1885–1886), the County Dublin Championships one time (1887). In 1899 Hamilton played his last tournament at the Netherlands International Championships.

He was given the nickname "The Ghost" due to his pale complexion.

== Grand Slam finals ==
=== Singles (1 title) ===
Result	Year	Championship	Surface	Opponent	Score
Win	1890	Wimbledon	Grass	(United Kingdom) William Renshaw	6–8, 6–2, 3–6, 6–1, 6–1

== Football career ==
Hamilton was educated at Trinity College Dublin and he played association football for both Dublin University A.F.C. and for Dublin Association F.C. Hamilton also played for Ireland in an 1885 game against Wales. Among his teammates was his brother William Hamilton.

== Personal ==
Hamilton was born on 9 December 1864 in Monasterevin, County Kildare, to Alfred Hamilton, a Church of Ireland rector, and Henrietta Cole. Willougby came from a famous sporting playing family. Three brothers all excelled at sports; William Drummond Hamilton represented Ireland at cricket and tennis, Francis Cole Lowry Hamilton played cricket for Ireland and Blayney Hamilton represented Ireland at cricket and badminton. In addition three of his nephews and nieces (Blayney's children) were badminton internationals (Arthur Hamilton, Willoughby Hamilton and Mavis Hamilton). He died in Sydenham House, Dundrum, Dublin, on 27 September 1943 at the age of 78.
