= 1885 men's tennis season =

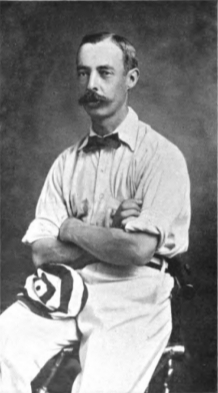
- James Dwight won the Northern Championships and is title leader this season.

Details
- Duration: 2 April – 11 November
- Tournaments: 131
- Categories: Important (4); National (4); Provincial/Regional/State (18); County (12); Regular (81)

Achievements (singles)
- Most titles: (United States) James Dwight (6)
- Most finals: (United States) James Dwight (8)

The 1885 men's tennis season was the tenth annual tennis circuit, consisting of 131 tournaments. It began on 1 January in New York City, United States and ended 11 November in Singapore, British Malaya.

== Season summary ==
In a repeat of the 1884 final, Herbert Lawford retained his Irish Lawn Tennis Championships title in Dublin, defeating Ernest Renshaw in five sets. William Renshaw won a fifth consecutive Wimbledon Championship. American player James Dwight broke British dominance at the Northern Championships in Manchester, defeating defending champion Donald Stewart in straight sets. In the United States Richard Sears collected a fifth consecutive US National Championship, beating Godfrey Brinley in four sets. In Australia, the New South Wales Championships were held for the first time at the Association Cricket Ground at the Moore Park in Sydney. In England, the British Covered Court Championships, one of the first tournaments in history to be played on indoor courts, is held in London.

American player James Dwight was the title leader for the season, winning 6 titles from 8 finals. He was the first non-European player to do so since 1877.

== Season results ==
Notes 1: Challenge round: the final round of a tournament, in which the winner of a single-elimination phase faces the previous year's champion, who plays only that one match. The challenge round was used in the early history of tennis (from 1877 through 1921), in some tournaments not all.

* Indicates challenger

Notes 2:Tournaments in italics were events that were staged only once that season

Key

Important.
National
Provincial/State/Regional
County
Local

Tournaments in 1885 included:

=== January ===
Date	Tournament	Winner	Finalist	Semi finalist	Quarter finalist
1–January.	Seventh Regiment Championship; Seventh Regiment LTC; Seventh Regiment Armory; New York City, NY, United States; Hard (indoors)	(United States) Henry Graff Trevor ?		.	

=== February ===
No events

=== March ===
'No events

=== April ===
Date	Tournament	Winner	Finalist	Semi finalist	Quarter finalist
April.	Canterbury Championships; Canterbury LTC; Christchurch, New Zealand; Grass; Singles - Doubles	(New Zealand) Frederick Wilding; 6-2 6-3 6-3	(New Zealand) C.C. Corfe	(New Zealand) Edward James Ross	(New Zealand) F.H. Bruges (United Kingdom of Great Britain and Ireland) A.W. Cooke (New Zealand) J.B. Harrison
2 April.	British Covered Court Championships; Hyde Park Lawn Tennis Club; London, England; Indoor; Wood; Singles - Doubles	(United Kingdom of Great Britain and Ireland) Herbert Lawford; 7-5, 6-3 6-0	(United Kingdom of Great Britain and Ireland) Charles Hoadley Ashe Ross	(United Kingdom of Great Britain and Ireland) Herbert Chipp (United Kingdom of Great Britain and Ireland) Charles Prideaux Triscott	(United Kingdom of Great Britain and Ireland) E. Syers Henley (United Kingdom of Great Britain and Ireland) E. Syers Henley (United Kingdom of Great Britain and Ireland) William C. Taylor (United Kingdom of Great Britain and Ireland) Herbert Wilberforce

=== May ===
Date	Tournament	Winner	Finalist	Semi finalist	Quarter finalist
4- 7 May	Cambridge University LTC Tournament; Cambridge; Great Britain; Grass	(United Kingdom of Great Britain and Ireland) Herbert Wilberforce; 6-2 1-6 6-2 7-5	(United Kingdom of Great Britain and Ireland) Frederick Hooper Aldrich-Blake	(United Kingdom of Great Britain and Ireland) John Moyer Heathcote (United Kingdom of Great Britain and Ireland) Howard Pease	(United Kingdom of Great Britain and Ireland) William Nevill Cobbold (United Kingdom of Great Britain and Ireland) Thomas Barton Holmes (United Kingdom of Great Britain and Ireland) Alfred E. Walker7 (United Kingdom of Great Britain and Ireland) H. Ward
5 - 7 May	Inter-Colonial Lawn Tennis Tournament; Sydney; Australia; Grass	(Australia) William John Bush-Salmon; 1–6, 6–8, 6–3, 6–2, 6–3	(Australia) Walter John C. Riddell	(Australia) Rex Allen	(Australia) Thomas Bately Rolin (Australia) Dudley Webb
18 May.	Longwood Cricket Club Tournament (later Longwood Bowl); Longwood Cricket Club, Chestnut Hill, Mass, USA; Outdoor; Grass; Singles - Doubles	(United States) Howard Augustus Taylor ?			
19 - 25 May.	Ilkley Tournament; Ilkley LTC; Ilkley, Yorkshire, England; Grass	(United Kingdom of Great Britain and Ireland) E.W. Fletcher; 6-4 4-6 6-5	(United Kingdom of Great Britain and Ireland) A.R. Atkinson	(United Kingdom of Great Britain and Ireland) W.T. Booker (United Kingdom of Great Britain and Ireland) M. Pole	(United Kingdom of Great Britain and Ireland) William Gerald Barker (United Kingdom of Great Britain and Ireland) D.F. Douglas (United Kingdom of Great Britain and Ireland) Arthur Copson Peake (United Kingdom of Great Britain and Ireland) E.M. Turner
20 - 25 May.	Whitehouse Open; Whitehouse Lawn Tennis Club; Edinburgh, Lothian, Scotland; Outdoor; Clay	(Scotland) Herbert Bowes-Lyon; 8-6, 11-13, 6-4, 6-3	(England) Richard Henry Fuller	(United Kingdom of Great Britain and Ireland) George Kerr (Scotland) Archibald Thomson	(Scotland) William Ferguson (Scotland) John Galbraith Horn (Scotland) Charles R. Andrew Howden (Scotland) Alfred Aitken Thomson
18 - 26 May	Irish Lawn Tennis Championships; Fitzwilliam LTC; Dublin, Ireland; Grass	(United Kingdom of Great Britain and Ireland) Herbert Lawford; 4-6, 6–2, 3–6, 6–3, 6-4	(Ireland) Eyre Chatterton; 6-4, 7–5, 9-7	(Ireland) Ernest Browne (Ireland) Willoughby Hamilton	(United States) James Dwight (United Kingdom of Great Britain and Ireland) George Bloomfield Garvey (United Kingdom of Great Britain and Ireland) A.C. Robertson (United Kingdom of Great Britain and Ireland) Robert Shaw Templer
18 - 26 May	Irish Lawn Tennis Championships; Fitzwilliam LTC; Dublin, Ireland; Grass	Challenger (United Kingdom of Great Britain and Ireland) Ernest Renshaw		(Ireland) Ernest Browne (Ireland) Willoughby Hamilton	(United States) James Dwight (United Kingdom of Great Britain and Ireland) George Bloomfield Garvey (United Kingdom of Great Britain and Ireland) A.C. Robertson (United Kingdom of Great Britain and Ireland) Robert Shaw Templer
23 - 26 May.	Fitzwilliam Plate; Fitzwilliam LTC; Dublin, Ireland; Grass	(Ireland) Herbert Knox McKay; 6-3 7-5 6-2	(United Kingdom of Great Britain and Ireland) William C. Taylor	(Ireland) Tom Campion (United Kingdom of Great Britain and Ireland) J.Butler Robinson	(United Kingdom of Great Britain and Ireland) Harry Grove (Ireland) John Charles Kay (Ireland) Ernest Edward Knox (Ireland) Gilbert Mahon
23 - 26 May.	Fitzwilliam Purse; Fitzwilliam LTC; Dublin, Ireland; Grass	(Ireland) Charles Henry Chaytor; 6-3 7-5 6-2	(United Kingdom of Great Britain and Ireland) George Arnulph Montgomerie	(Ireland) Toler Roberts Garvey (United Kingdom of Great Britain and Ireland) Thomas Harrison Griffiths	(United Kingdom of Great Britain and Ireland) Edward Bernard Greene (Ireland) William Drummond Hamilton (Ireland) Ronald M. McDougall (Ireland) A. Taylor
26 May.	Young America Cricket Club Invitation; Young America Cricket Club; Stanton, Philadelphia, Pennsylvania, United States; Grass; Singles – Doubles	(United States) Joseph Sill Clark Sr. 6-3, 6-3, 6-2	(United States) Clarence Munroe Clark	(United States) Richard Field Conover (United States) William V.S. Thorne	
11 - 27 May	Dublin University Championships; Dublin; Ireland; Asphalt	(Ireland) Tom Campion; 5-7 6-1 7-5 6-1	(Ireland) Charles Henry Chaytor	(Ireland) David Wilson Christie (Ireland) C. Stein	(Ireland) Eyre Chatterton (Ireland) Herbert Knox McKay
25 - 30 May	West of England Championships; Bath; Great Britain; Grass	(United Kingdom of Great Britain and Ireland) Ernest de Sylly H. Browne; 6-3, 6–1,6-4	(United States) James Dwight	(United Kingdom of Great Britain and Ireland) Edward G. Meyricke (United Kingdom of Great Britain and Ireland) William C. Taylor	(United Kingdom of Great Britain and Ireland) Charles Hoadley Ashe Ross (United Kingdom of Great Britain and Ireland) E.H. Nicolls (United Kingdom of Great Britain and Ireland) H. Peters (United Kingdom of Great Britain and Ireland) C.A. Williamson
30 May.	Scarlet Ribbon Amateur Tournament; Scarlet Ribbon LTC; Groveland Avenue, Chicago, Illinois, United States. Surface ?	(United States) J.W. Corwith ?	(United States) Charles A. Chase		

=== June ===
Date	Tournament	Winner	Finalist	Semi finalist	Quarter finalist
30 May -6 June.	East Orange Club Amateur Tournament; East Orange Athletic Club; East Orange, New Jersey, United States; Grass	(United States) Patrick Lyman; 6-4, 6-3, 6-3	(United States) Wallace Percy Knapp		
June.	Oxford University Champion Tournament; Norham Gardens, Oxford, Great Britain; Grass; Singles – Doubles	(England) Thomas Robinson Grey; 6-3, 5–7, 6–3, 6-3	(England) J.S. Burton	(England) Harry Grove (England) Edward G. Meyricke	(England) Benjamin V. Sellon Brodie (United States) Hamilton A. Emmons (United Kingdom) J.B. Forman (England) Stephen Dickinson Winkworth
June.	Oxford University Champion Tournament; Norham Gardens, Oxford, Great Britain; Grass; Singles – Doubles	(United States) Hamilton A. Emmons (England) Thomas Robinson Grey; 6-3, 4-6, 6-3, 3-6, 9-7	(England) Harry Grove (United Kingdom) John Redfern Deykin	(England) Harry Grove (England) Edward G. Meyricke	(England) Benjamin V. Sellon Brodie (United States) Hamilton A. Emmons (United Kingdom) J.B. Forman (England) Stephen Dickinson Winkworth
June.	Oxford University Champion Tournament; Norham Gardens, Oxford, Great Britain; Grass; Singles – Doubles	(England) Thomas Musgrave Burton (England) Miss Burton; 6-0, 6-5	(England) Thomas Robinson Grey (England) Miss Davis,	(England) Harry Grove (England) Edward G. Meyricke	(England) Benjamin V. Sellon Brodie (United States) Hamilton A. Emmons (United Kingdom) J.B. Forman (England) Stephen Dickinson Winkworth
1 - 6 June	East Gloucestershire Championships; Cheltenham, Great Britain; Hard; Singles - Doubles	(United Kingdom) Ernest Browne; 6-4, 6–3, 6-2	(United Kingdom of Great Britain and Ireland) Charles Hoadley Ashe Ross	(United States) James Dwight (United Kingdom of Great Britain and Ireland) Donald Stewart	(United Kingdom of Great Britain and Ireland) Frederick William Knox (United Kingdom of Great Britain and Ireland) William C. Taylor (United Kingdom of Great Britain and Ireland) Charles Lacy Sweet (United Kingdom of Great Britain and Ireland) Robert Charles Thompson
8 - 13 June	London Athletic Club Open Tournament; Stamford Bridge, Fulham, Great Britain; Grass; Singles - Doubles	(United Kingdom of Great Britain and Ireland) Charles Hoadley Ashe Ross; 3-6, 8–6, 1–6, 6–2, 6-3	(United Kingdom of Great Britain and Ireland) Ernest Wool Lewis	(United Kingdom of Great Britain and Ireland) Harry Grove (United Kingdom of Great Britain and Ireland) William C. Taylor	(United Kingdom of Great Britain and Ireland) E.W. Brook (United Kingdom of Great Britain and Ireland) Herbert Chipp (United Kingdom of Great Britain and Ireland) James Herbert Crispe (United Kingdom of Great Britain and Ireland) Charles Lacy Sweet
19 - 12 June	Middle States Championships; Hoboken, New Jersey, United States; Grass; Singles - Doubles	(United States) Richard Sears; 6-4, 6–1, 6-3	(United States) Howard Augustus Taylor	(United States) Robert Livingston Beeckman (United States) Charles Belmont Davis	(United States) Joseph Sill Clark Sr. (United States) M.P. Gybbes (United States) E. Spinnet (United States) C.A. Stevens
10 - 13 June.	Edinburgh University LTC Open; Edinburgh University LTC; Corstorphine, Edinburgh, Scotland; Clay; Singles - Doubles	(Scotland) Herbert Bowes-Lyon; 6-1, 6-2, 6-1	(Scotland) T. Leigh MacLachlan	(Scotland) John Galbraith Horn (Scotland) George James Kerr	(United Kingdom of Great Britain and Ireland) James H. Aitken (Scotland) Charles R. A. Howden (England) Reginald H. Noott (Scotland) Alex Thomson
15 - 17 June.	Acton Vale LTC Open; Acton Vale LTC; East Acton, London, England; Grass; Singles - Doubles	(United Kingdom of Great Britain and Ireland) Ernest Wool Lewis; 7-5 6-2 7-5	(United Kingdom of Great Britain and Ireland) Herbert Chipp	(United Kingdom of Great Britain and Ireland) Harold Stapylton Greenwell (United Kingdom of Great Britain and Ireland) Arthur Wellesley Hallward	(United Kingdom of Great Britain and Ireland) Frederick Alexander Bowlby (United Kingdom of Great Britain and Ireland) F. Bramah (United Kingdom of Great Britain and Ireland) F.E. Cole (United Kingdom of Great Britain and Ireland) A. Walker
13 - 19 June.	Waterloo Tournament; Liverpool, Great Britain; Grass; Singles - Doubles	(United Kingdom of Great Britain and Ireland) Charles Stananought; 7-5, 6–3, 5–7, 7-5	(United Kingdom of Great Britain and Ireland) Jacob Gaitskell Brown	(United Kingdom of Great Britain and Ireland) Andrew Laurie Macfie (United Kingdom of Great Britain and Ireland) James Alexander Rome	(United Kingdom of Great Britain and Ireland) L.W. Brooke (United Kingdom of Great Britain and Ireland) John Edmondson (United Kingdom of Great Britain and Ireland) J.W. Fowler (Scotland) Richard Millar Watson
16 - 19 June.	Leamington Open Tournament; Leamington LTC; Leamington Spa, Warwickshire, England; Grass; Singles - Doubles	(United States) James Dwight; 6-3 6-2 6-2	(Ireland) Alfred Henry Betham	(United Kingdom of Great Britain and Ireland) Francis Russell Burrow (United States) Hamilton A. Emmons	(United Kingdom of Great Britain and Ireland) G. Clark (United Kingdom of Great Britain and Ireland) J.B. Forman (United Kingdom of Great Britain and Ireland) Windsor Richard Heneage (United Kingdom of Great Britain and Ireland) John Charles Kay
16 - 19 June.	Warwickshire Championships; Leamington LTC; Leamington Spa, Warwickshire, England; Grass; Singles - Doubles	(United States) Hamilton A. Emmons w.o.	(United Kingdom of Great Britain and Ireland) John Charles Kay	(United Kingdom of Great Britain and Ireland) J.H. Mitchell (United Kingdom of Great Britain and Ireland) W.J. Sarjant	(United Kingdom of Great Britain and Ireland) A.E.H. Clarke (United Kingdom of Great Britain and Ireland) A.H. Griffiths (United Kingdom of Great Britain and Ireland) Albert Cecil Hill; L. Richardson
17 - 20 June.	Broughty Ferry Open; Broughty Ferry LTC; Broughty Ferry, Dundee, Angus, Scotland; Clay; Singles - Doubles	(Scotland) A. Browne; 6-2 4-6 8-6 6-8 6-2	(Scotland) George Nelson Stenhouse	(United Kingdom of Great Britain and Ireland) J.B. Gray (Scotland) L.F. Robertson	(United Kingdom of Great Britain and Ireland) G.A. Ballingall (Scotland) T. Leigh MacLachlan (United Kingdom of Great Britain and Ireland) H.B. Mitchell (United Kingdom of Great Britain and Ireland) D.J. Walls
18 - 20 June.	Brincliffe Lawn Tennis Club Open Tournament; Brincliffe LTC; Bramall Lane, Sheffield, South Riding, England; Grass; Singles - Doubles	(United States) James Dwight; 2-6, 6-1, 6-3, 6-4	(United States) Arthur John Stanley	(United Kingdom of Great Britain and Ireland) Ernest Wool Lewis (United Kingdom of Great Britain and Ireland) Charles Lacy Sweet	(Ireland) Ernest Browne (United States) Hamilton A. Emmons (United Kingdom of Great Britain and Ireland) John Charles Kay (United Kingdom of Great Britain and Ireland) E.M. Turner
20-23 June.	Chapel Allerton LTC Tournament; Chapel Allerton LTC; West Riding of Yorkshire, England; Grass; Singles - Doubles	(England) John Thorneycroft Hartley; 6-0 6-2 6-1	(England) Alexander Mallinson	(England) Charles Joseph Dymond (England) Maxwell Fitzsimmons	(England) Maurice Spencer Clark (United Kingdom of Great Britain and Ireland) Reginald Higginbottom (United Kingdom of Great Britain and Ireland) Walter Oliver (England) Montague Stephenson
23 June.	Fall Open Tournament Far and Near LTC; Far and Near LTC; Hastings-on-Hudson, New York, USA; Outdoor; Grass; Singles - Doubles	(United States) Robert Livingston Beeckman ?	>		
24 June.	Berrylands Club Tournament; Berrylands LTC; Surbiton, Surrey, England; Outdoor; Grass; Singles	(United Kingdom of Great Britain and Ireland) R. Playford; 6-2, 6-2, 6-1	(United Kingdom of Great Britain and Ireland) J.F. Newton	(United Kingdom of Great Britain and Ireland) L. Newton (United Kingdom of Great Britain and Ireland) A.B. Tomkins	(United Kingdom of Great Britain and Ireland) J.W. Adamson (United Kingdom of Great Britain and Ireland) H. Higley (United Kingdom of Great Britain and Ireland) G. Rawlings (United Kingdom of Great Britain and Ireland) Harry Stanley Scrivener
20 - 27 June.	Northern Championships; Liverpool Cricket Club; Aigburth, Liverpool, England; Grass; Singles - Doubles	(United States) James Dwight; 6-2, 6–4, 6–4,	(United Kingdom of Great Britain and Ireland) Ernest Wool Lewis	(United Kingdom of Great Britain and Ireland) E.W. Fletcher (United Kingdom of Great Britain and Ireland) A.L. Payne	(United Kingdom of Great Britain and Ireland) Jacob Gaitskell Brown (United Kingdom of Great Britain and Ireland) William Nevill Cobbold (United States) Hamilton A. Emmons (United Kingdom of Great Britain and Ireland) Andrew Laurie Macfie
20 - 27 June.	Northern Championships; Liverpool Cricket Club; Aigburth, Liverpool, England; Grass; Singles - Doubles	Challenger (United Kingdom of Great Britain and Ireland) Donald Stewart		(United Kingdom of Great Britain and Ireland) E.W. Fletcher (United Kingdom of Great Britain and Ireland) A.L. Payne	(United Kingdom of Great Britain and Ireland) Jacob Gaitskell Brown (United Kingdom of Great Britain and Ireland) William Nevill Cobbold (United States) Hamilton A. Emmons (United Kingdom of Great Britain and Ireland) Andrew Laurie Macfie
25 - 26 June.	Orange Spring Tournament; Montrose, NJ, United States; Grass; Singles - Doubles	(United States) Howard Augustus Taylor; 7-5, 6–2, 6-3	(United States) William V.S. Thorne		

=== July ===
Date	Tournament	Winner	Finalist	Semi finalist	Quarter finalist
July	Natal Championships; Pietermaritzburg, South Africa; Outdoor; Grass; Singles - Doubles	(United Kingdom of Great Britain and Ireland) George Stanley; 18-17	(South Africa) W. J. Grant		
29 Jun - 3 July	Edgbaston Open Tournament; Edgabaston, Great Britain; Grass; Singles - Doubles	(United Kingdom of Great Britain and Ireland) Alfred Henry Betham; 6–1, 6–3, 8-6	(United Kingdom of Great Britain and Ireland) Walter Chamberlain	(United Kingdom of Great Britain and Ireland) Conway John Morgan (United Kingdom of Great Britain and Ireland) John George Thursfield	(United States) James Dwight (United Kingdom of Great Britain and Ireland) William Henry Mahon (United Kingdom of Great Britain and Ireland) Edward G. Meyricke (United Kingdom of Great Britain and Ireland) Reginald Pease
29 Jun - 3 July	Midland Counties Championships; Edgbaston Cricket and Lawn Tennis Club; Edgbaston, Warwickshire, England; Grass; Singles - Doubles	(United Kingdom of Great Britain and Ireland) Conway John Morgan; 6-4, 2-6, 2-6, 6-2, 9-7	(United Kingdom of Great Britain and Ireland) John George Thursfield	(United Kingdom of Great Britain and Ireland) George Reston Brewerton (United Kingdom of Great Britain and Ireland) Edward G. Meyricke	(United Kingdom of Great Britain and Ireland) George Howard Cartland (United Kingdom of Great Britain and Ireland) William Brunston Thursfield (United Kingdom of Great Britain and Ireland) E.P. Wright
29 Jun - 3 July	Midland Counties Championships; Edgbaston Cricket and Lawn Tennis Club; Edgbaston, Warwickshire, England; Grass; Singles - Doubles	Challenger (United Kingdom of Great Britain and Ireland) Walter William Chamberlain		(United Kingdom of Great Britain and Ireland) George Reston Brewerton (United Kingdom of Great Britain and Ireland) Edward G. Meyricke	(United Kingdom of Great Britain and Ireland) George Howard Cartland (United Kingdom of Great Britain and Ireland) William Brunston Thursfield (United Kingdom of Great Britain and Ireland) E.P. Wright
29 Jun - 3 July	Midland Counties Championships; Edgbaston Cricket and Lawn Tennis Club; Edgbaston, Warwickshire, England; Grass; Singles - Doubles	(United Kingdom of Great Britain and Ireland) Walter William Chamberlain (United Kingdom of Great Britain and Ireland) Margaret Bracewell; 6-1, 8-10, 6-3	(United Kingdom of Great Britain and Ireland) W.H. Mahon (Ireland) Beatrice Langrishe 6-3, 6-1, 6-1	(United Kingdom of Great Britain and Ireland) George Reston Brewerton (United Kingdom of Great Britain and Ireland) Edward G. Meyricke	(United Kingdom of Great Britain and Ireland) George Howard Cartland (United Kingdom of Great Britain and Ireland) William Brunston Thursfield (United Kingdom of Great Britain and Ireland) E.P. Wright
2 - 4 July	Northumberland Cricket Club Open; Newcastle upon Tyne, Great Britain; Grass; Singles - Doubles	(United Kingdom of Great Britain and Ireland) A. Dunn Jr. 3-6 6-1 6-1 6-4	(United Kingdom of Great Britain and Ireland) Percival Fenwick	(United Kingdom of Great Britain and Ireland) Kenneth Ramsden Marley (United Kingdom of Great Britain and Ireland) 1-6 6-3 6-5	(United Kingdom of Great Britain and Ireland) J. A. Connor. (United Kingdom of Great Britain and Ireland) Mark Fenwick (United Kingdom of Great Britain and Ireland) Arthur Godfrey Pease (United Kingdom of Great Britain and Ireland) Hugh A. Taylor
7 – 10 July.	North Berkshire ALTC Tournament; Abingdon, North Berkshire, England; Outdoor; Grass; Singles - Doubles	(United Kingdom of Great Britain and Ireland) A.D. Hensley; 3-6, 6-3, 6-2	(United Kingdom of Great Britain and Ireland) W.A. Jacob	(United Kingdom of Great Britain and Ireland) J.H. Deazeley (United Kingdom of Great Britain and Ireland) T.E. Graham	(United Kingdom of Great Britain and Ireland) W. Abbott (United Kingdom of Great Britain and Ireland) W.R. Graham (United Kingdom of Great Britain and Ireland) Edward Arundel Geare (United Kingdom of Great Britain and Ireland) S. Hayman
7 – 10 July.	North Berkshire ALTC Tournament; Abingdon, North Berkshire, England; Outdoor; Grass; Singles - Doubles	(United Kingdom of Great Britain and Ireland) A.D. Hensley (United Kingdom of Great Britain and Ireland) Miss Binney; 6-1, 4-6, 6-3	(United Kingdom of Great Britain and Ireland) W.R. Graham (United Kingdom of Great Britain and Ireland) Miss. Nicholas	(United Kingdom of Great Britain and Ireland) J.H. Deazeley (United Kingdom of Great Britain and Ireland) T.E. Graham	(United Kingdom of Great Britain and Ireland) W. Abbott (United Kingdom of Great Britain and Ireland) W.R. Graham (United Kingdom of Great Britain and Ireland) Edward Arundel Geare (United Kingdom of Great Britain and Ireland) S. Hayman
9 – 11 July.	Hull Westbourne Avenue Tournament; Westbourne Avenue LTC; Kingston upon Hull, England; Outdoor; Grass; Singles – Doubles	(Ireland) William Henry Mahon w.o.	(Ireland) Gilbert Mahon	(United Kingdom of Great Britain and Ireland) E.W. Brooke (United Kingdom of Great Britain and Ireland) L. Harrison	(United Kingdom of Great Britain and Ireland) Percival Clennell Fenwick (England) Philip Leslie Hirst (United Kingdom of Great Britain and Ireland) J.T. Jones
5 - 15 July	Wimbledon Championships; London, Great Britain; Grass; Singles - Doubles	(United Kingdom of Great Britain and Ireland) William Renshaw; 7-5, 6–2, 4–6, 7-5	(United Kingdom of Great Britain and Ireland) Ernest Renshaw	(United Kingdom of Great Britain and Ireland) Ernest Browne (United States) James Dwight	(United Kingdom of Great Britain and Ireland) Herbert Chipp (Ireland) Michael Gallwey McNamara (Scotland) Patrick Bowes-Lyon (United Kingdom of Great Britain and Ireland) Arthur John Stanley
5 - 15 July	Wimbledon Championships; London, Great Britain; Grass; Singles - Doubles	Challenger (United Kingdom of Great Britain and Ireland) Herbert Lawford		(United Kingdom of Great Britain and Ireland) Ernest Browne (United States) James Dwight	(United Kingdom of Great Britain and Ireland) Herbert Chipp (Ireland) Michael Gallwey McNamara (Scotland) Patrick Bowes-Lyon (United Kingdom of Great Britain and Ireland) Arthur John Stanley
15 - 17 July.	Rainthorpe Hall Open; Rainthorpe Hall; Tasburgh, Norfolk, England; Grass; Singles - Doubles	(United Kingdom of Great Britain and Ireland) Francis William Monement ?	(United Kingdom of Great Britain and Ireland) William Bolding Monement	(United Kingdom of Great Britain and Ireland) Edgar Sheppard Paston Mack (United Kingdom of Great Britain and Ireland) G.E. Preston	(United Kingdom of Great Britain and Ireland) H.C. Marsh (United Kingdom of Great Britain and Ireland) O' Shaughnessy Belli Reade (United Kingdom of Great Britain and Ireland) A.R. Stephenson (United Kingdom of Great Britain and Ireland) H. Twining
13 - 18 July	East of Ireland Championships; Howth, Ireland; Grass; Singles - Doubles	(Ireland) Eyre Chatterton; 2-6, 3–6, 7–5, 7–5, 6-0	(Ireland) Willoughby Hamilton	(United Kingdom of Great Britain and Ireland) Ernest Edward Knox (Ireland) Herbert Knox McKay	(Ireland) Ernest Browne (Ireland) Thomas Harrison Griffiths (Ireland) William Drummond Hamilton (Ireland) Robert Shaw Templer
13 - 19 July	Gore Court Championships; Sittingbourne, Great Britain; Clay; Singles - Doubles	(United Kingdom of Great Britain and Ireland) Ernest Wool Lewis; 6-1, 6-2	(United Kingdom of Great Britain and Ireland) Ernest George Meers	(United Kingdom of Great Britain and Ireland) C. Perry (United Kingdom of Great Britain and Ireland) E. Marmion	(United Kingdom of Great Britain and Ireland) A. Chittenden (United Kingdom of Great Britain and Ireland) L. Parsons (United Kingdom of Great Britain and Ireland) Edward Berners Upcher (United Kingdom of Great Britain and Ireland) F.B. Wallace
13 - 19 July	Northern Counties Challenge Cup; Norton, County Durham, Great Britain; Grass; Singles - Doubles	(United States) Hamilton A. Emmons; 4-6, 6–1, 6–2, 6-2	(United Kingdom of Great Britain and Ireland) Arthur Godfrey Pease	(United Kingdom of Great Britain and Ireland) William Edwin Pease (United Kingdom of Great Britain and Ireland) E.R. Turner	(United Kingdom of Great Britain and Ireland) George E. Newby (United Kingdom of Great Britain and Ireland) Howard Pease (United Kingdom of Great Britain and Ireland) Thomas Walker (United Kingdom of Great Britain and Ireland) W.E. Walker
20 September.	Litchfield Open; Litchfield Lawn Club; Litchfield, Connecticut, United States; Grass; Singles - Doubles	(United States) Henry Warner Slocum Jr. ?	?		
20 - 25 July	Middlesex Championships; Chiswick Park, Middlesex, England; Grass; Singles - Doubles	(United Kingdom of Great Britain and Ireland) Herbert Chipp; 7-5,7-5, 6-3	(United Kingdom of Great Britain and Ireland) Donald Stewart	(United Kingdom of Great Britain and Ireland) Harry Grove (United Kingdom of Great Britain and Ireland) Charles Hoadley Ashe Ross	(United Kingdom of Great Britain and Ireland) Henry Wilson-Fox (United Kingdom of Great Britain and Ireland) Ernest Wool Lewis (United Kingdom of Great Britain and Ireland) Edward Barratt-Smith (United Kingdom of Great Britain and Ireland) Robert Charles Thompson
20 - 25 July	Middlesex Championships; Chiswick Park, Middlesex, England; Grass; Singles - Doubles	(United Kingdom of Great Britain and Ireland) Mr. Farrer (United Kingdom of Great Britain and Ireland) Harry Grove; 6-1, 8-10, 6-3	(United Kingdom of Great Britain and Ireland) William C. Taylor (United Kingdom of Great Britain and Ireland) Charles Hoadley Ashe Ross	(United Kingdom of Great Britain and Ireland) Harry Grove (United Kingdom of Great Britain and Ireland) Charles Hoadley Ashe Ross	(United Kingdom of Great Britain and Ireland) Henry Wilson-Fox (United Kingdom of Great Britain and Ireland) Ernest Wool Lewis (United Kingdom of Great Britain and Ireland) Edward Barratt-Smith (United Kingdom of Great Britain and Ireland) Robert Charles Thompson
20 - 25 July	Middlesex Championships; Chiswick Park, Middlesex, England; Grass; Singles - Doubles	(United Kingdom of Great Britain and Ireland) Harry Grove (United Kingdom of Great Britain and Ireland) Blanche Bingley; 6-3, 4-6, 6-4	(United Kingdom of Great Britain and Ireland) Ernest Wool Lewis (Ireland) Beatrice Langrishe	(United Kingdom of Great Britain and Ireland) Harry Grove (United Kingdom of Great Britain and Ireland) Charles Hoadley Ashe Ross	(United Kingdom of Great Britain and Ireland) Henry Wilson-Fox (United Kingdom of Great Britain and Ireland) Ernest Wool Lewis (United Kingdom of Great Britain and Ireland) Edward Barratt-Smith (United Kingdom of Great Britain and Ireland) Robert Charles Thompson
20 - 25 July	Worcestershire County Cricket Club Open; Worcester, Great Britain; Grass	(United Kingdom of Great Britain and Ireland) John Charles Kay; 6-2, 6-3	(United Kingdom of Great Britain and Ireland) Frederick William Knox	(United Kingdom of Great Britain and Ireland) F.H.A. Blake (United Kingdom of Great Britain and Ireland) Walter William Chamberlain	(United Kingdom of Great Britain and Ireland) A.E. Daldy (United Kingdom of Great Britain and Ireland) William Henry Mahon (United Kingdom of Great Britain and Ireland) Conway John Morgan (United Kingdom of Great Britain and Ireland) H.T. Shapley
21 - 27 July.	South of Ireland Championships; Limerick, Ireland; Grass; Singles - Doubles	(Ireland) Willoughby Hamilton; 6-3 10-8 2-6 6-3	(Ireland) Tom Campion	(Ireland) Charles Henry Chaytor (Ireland) Edward M. L. Lysaght	(Ireland) W.H. Clarke (Ireland) Thomas Harrison Griffiths (Ireland) William Drumond Hamilton
21 - 27 July.	South of Ireland Championships; Limerick, Ireland; Grass; Singles - Doubles	Challenger (Ireland) Eyre Chatterton		(Ireland) Charles Henry Chaytor (Ireland) Edward M. L. Lysaght	(Ireland) W.H. Clarke (Ireland) Thomas Harrison Griffiths (Ireland) William Drumond Hamilton
22 - 25 July	Northumberland Championships; Newcastle upon Tyne, Great Britain; Singles - Doubles	(United States) Hamilton A. Emmons; 3-6 6-1 6-1 6-4	(New Zealand) Percival Fenwick	(United Kingdom of Great Britain and Ireland) Kenneth Ramsden Marley (United Kingdom of Great Britain and Ireland) Gilbert Mahon	(United Kingdom of Great Britain and Ireland) A.L. Davidson (United Kingdom of Great Britain and Ireland) A. Dunn Jr. (United Kingdom of Great Britain and Ireland) William Edwin Pease (United Kingdom of Great Britain and Ireland) E.M. Shand
23 - 25 July. (Note: The Leicester Lawn Tennis Club Tournament was founded in 1878 it staged its first tournament in 1880 called the Leicester Lawn Tennis Tournament. In 1883 it became an open tournament the Leicester Open Tennis Tournament for both men and women until 1938. The club also shared the staging of the Leicestershire County Championships with other venues.)	Leicester Lawn Tennis Club Tournament; Leicester, Great Britain; Grass; Singles - Doubles	(United Kingdom of Great Britain and Ireland) William Nevill Cobbold; 6-1, 6–2, 6-0 ret.	(United Kingdom of Great Britain and Ireland) Francis Seymour (Frank) Noon	(United Kingdom of Great Britain and Ireland) George Ernest Dixon Brown (United States) James Dwight	(United Kingdom of Great Britain and Ireland) Percy Bateman Brown (United Kingdom of Great Britain and Ireland) L. Hampson (United Kingdom of Great Britain and Ireland) Sidney Alfred Noon (United Kingdom of Great Britain and Ireland) A. Smith
20 - 26 July	Redhill Open; Redhill, Surrey, Great Britain; Singles - Doubles	(United Kingdom of Great Britain and Ireland) Harold Stone; 6–2, 6-4	(United Kingdom of Great Britain and Ireland) F.E. Cole	(United Kingdom of Great Britain and Ireland) Harold Stapylton Greenwell (United Kingdom of Great Britain and Ireland) Arthur Wellesley Hallward	(United Kingdom of Great Britain and Ireland) Vincent Sydney Allpress (United Kingdom of Great Britain and Ireland) Edgar John Chippendale (United Kingdom of Great Britain and Ireland) William John Down (United Kingdom of Great Britain and Ireland) E. Ranger
27 - 30 July	Les Diablerets International Lawn Tennis Tournament; Les Diablerets, Switzerland; Clay	(United Kingdom of Great Britain and Ireland) R.H. Legge; 3-6 6-1 6-4	(United Kingdom of Great Britain and Ireland) W. Ross	(United Kingdom of Great Britain and Ireland) H.J. Hamilton (United Kingdom of Great Britain and Ireland) W.M. Smyth	(United Kingdom of Great Britain and Ireland) D. Fitzgerald (United Kingdom of Great Britain and Ireland) R.T. Michell (United Kingdom of Great Britain and Ireland) S.R. Snelling (United Kingdom of Great Britain and Ireland) P. Stares
27–31 July.	North Wales Challenge Cup; Vale of Clwyd LTC; Denbigh, Vale of Clwyd, Wales; Outdoor; Grass; Singles	(Wales) G. Egerton; 6-4, 6-4	(England) A. Evill	(Wales) Thomas A. Wynne Edwards (England) Arthur Bennett Mesham	(Wales) J.R. Wynne Edwards (United Kingdom of Great Britain and Ireland) Mr. Hope (United Kingdom) P. Ormrod (United Kingdom of Great Britain and Ireland) A.H. Turnour
27–31 July.	North Wales Challenge Cup; Vale of Clwyd LTC; Denbigh, Vale of Clwyd, Wales; Outdoor; Grass; Singles	Challenger (United Kingdom of Great Britain and Ireland) Captain H.T. Ravenhill		(Wales) Thomas A. Wynne Edwards (England) Arthur Bennett Mesham	(Wales) J.R. Wynne Edwards (United Kingdom of Great Britain and Ireland) Mr. Hope (United Kingdom) P. Ormrod (United Kingdom of Great Britain and Ireland) A.H. Turnour

=== August ===
Date	Tournament	Winner	Finalist	Semi finalist	Quarter finalist
August.	Charmouth Open; Charmouth LTC; Charmouth, West Dorset, England; Outdoor; Grass; Singles	(United Kingdom of Great Britain and Ireland) L. Wynch; 3-6, 6-0, 6-1	(United Kingdom of Great Britain and Ireland) Mr. Frazer	(United Kingdom of Great Britain and Ireland) Reginald Huyshe-Eliot	(United Kingdom of Great Britain and Ireland) Mr. Caistor (United Kingdom of Great Britain and Ireland) Charles Barrington Philpott (United Kingdom of Great Britain and Ireland) F. Wynch
August.	Charmouth Open; Charmouth LTC; Charmouth, West Dorset, England; Outdoor; Grass; Singles	(United Kingdom of Great Britain and Ireland) Mr. T. Lewis (United Kingdom of Great Britain and Ireland) Miss T.H. Lewis; 6-2, 6-3	(United Kingdom of Great Britain and Ireland) Mr. H. Lewis (United Kingdom of Great Britain and Ireland) Miss. Vertue	(United Kingdom of Great Britain and Ireland) Reginald Huyshe-Eliot	(United Kingdom of Great Britain and Ireland) Mr. Caistor (United Kingdom of Great Britain and Ireland) Charles Barrington Philpott (United Kingdom of Great Britain and Ireland) F. Wynch
27 July - 1 August.	King's County and Ormonde Tournament; Parsonstown, Ireland; Grass; Singles - Doubles	(Ireland) Ernest Browne; 6-4, 6–4, 4-6 8-6	(Ireland) Robert Chaloner Knox	(United Kingdom of Great Britain and Ireland) F.E. Bird (United Kingdom of Great Britain and Ireland) W.G. Pearson	(Ireland) Nicholas Trafalgar Biddulph (Ireland) George B. Garvey
27 July - 1 August.	King's County and Ormonde Tournament; Parsonstown, Ireland; Grass; Singles - Doubles	Challenger (Ireland) Toler Roberts Garvey		(United Kingdom of Great Britain and Ireland) F.E. Bird (United Kingdom of Great Britain and Ireland) W.G. Pearson	(Ireland) Nicholas Trafalgar Biddulph (Ireland) George B. Garvey
27 July - 1 Aug	Scottish Championships; Edinburgh, Scotland; Grass; Singles - Doubles	(Scotland) Patrick Bowes-Lyon; 6-3, 6–2, 6-4	(Scotland) Archibald Thomson	(Scotland) Herbert Bowes-Lyon (Scotland) George Nelson Stenhouse	(United Kingdom of Great Britain and Ireland) A.L. Davidson (United Kingdom of Great Britain and Ireland) A.P. Jones (Scotland) L. MacLachlan (Scotland) Anderson Steel
31 July–2 August.	Athboy Lawn Tennis Club Open Tournament; Athboy Lawn Tennis Club; Athboy, County Meath, Ireland. Outdoor; Grass; Singles	(Ireland) Charles Chaytor; 6-3, 6-0	(Ireland) George Hewson	(United Kingdom of Great Britain and Ireland) C. Coleridge	(Ireland) George Edward Vernon Cuppage (United Kingdom of Great Britain and Ireland) E. Collingwood (Ireland) James Sherrard
31 July–2 August.	Athboy Lawn Tennis Club Open Tournament; Athboy Lawn Tennis Club; Athboy, County Meath, Ireland. Outdoor; Grass; Singles	(Ireland) George Archibald Tisdall (Ireland) George Edward Vernon Cuppage; 6-4, 6-3	(United Kingdom of Great Britain and Ireland) Mr. Hyde (United Kingdom of Great Britain and Ireland) Mr. Ringwood	(United Kingdom of Great Britain and Ireland) C. Coleridge	(Ireland) George Edward Vernon Cuppage (United Kingdom of Great Britain and Ireland) E. Collingwood (Ireland) James Sherrard
31 July–1 August.	Rochester Open; Paddock Lawn Tennis Club; Rochester, Kent, England; Grass; Singles	(United Kingdom of Great Britain and Ireland) C.C.J. Perry; 6-1 6-2	(United Kingdom of Great Britain and Ireland) E.M. Lachlan	(United Kingdom of Great Britain and Ireland) A. Buchanan (United Kingdom of Great Britain and Ireland) F.J. Troughton	(United Kingdom of Great Britain and Ireland) W.S. Hunter (United Kingdom of Great Britain and Ireland) T.G. Stuart (Netherlands) Edwin Teixeira de Mattos (United Kingdom of Great Britain and Ireland) T.G. Stuart
1 - 4 August.	North of Wales Open; Pensarn LTC; Abergele, Conwy County Borough, North Wales; Grass; Singles - Doubles	(United Kingdom of Great Britain and Ireland) T.M. Draper ?	(England) Robert Parsons Earwaker	(United Kingdom of Great Britain and Ireland) E. Johnson (United Kingdom of Great Britain and Ireland) H. Sidebottom	(United Kingdom of Great Britain and Ireland) W.R. Craig (England) Alfred Pittis Earwaker (United Kingdom of Great Britain and Ireland) W. Orton (United Kingdom of Great Britain and Ireland) W. Lifton Wynne
5 August.	Fylde Tournament; Lytham LTC; Lytham Cricket Club Ground; Lytham St Annes, England. Grass; Singles	(United Kingdom of Great Britain and Ireland) John Leyland Birley; 6-3, 6-5	(United Kingdom of Great Britain and Ireland) Owen Seaman	(United Kingdom of Great Britain and Ireland) W.M. Baker	(United Kingdom of Great Britain and Ireland) J.M. Rea (United Kingdom of Great Britain and Ireland) E.T. Wilson (United Kingdom of Great Britain and Ireland) W.H.G. Worship
3 - 6 Aug	Darlington Association Tournament; Darlington, County Durham, England; Grass; Singles - Doubles	(Scotland) Patrick Bowes-Lyon; 6–0, 6–1, 6-3	(Scotland) John Galbraith Horn	(United Kingdom of Great Britain and Ireland) A. Dunn jr. (United Kingdom of Great Britain and Ireland) William Edwin Pease	(United Kingdom of Great Britain and Ireland) Algernon G. Bathurst (United Kingdom of Great Britain and Ireland) Harold S. Greenwell (United Kingdom of Great Britain and Ireland) G. Kemp (United Kingdom of Great Britain and Ireland) Arthur George Ridout
3 - 6 Aug	Darlington Association Tournament; Darlington, County Durham, England; Grass; Singles - Doubles	Challenger (United Kingdom of Great Britain and Ireland) Kenneth Ramsden Marley		(United Kingdom of Great Britain and Ireland) A. Dunn jr. (United Kingdom of Great Britain and Ireland) William Edwin Pease	(United Kingdom of Great Britain and Ireland) Algernon G. Bathurst (United Kingdom of Great Britain and Ireland) Harold S. Greenwell (United Kingdom of Great Britain and Ireland) G. Kemp (United Kingdom of Great Britain and Ireland) Arthur George Ridout
2 - 8 Aug.	Plymouth Open; West Hoe LTC; West Hoe, Plymouth, England; Grass	(United Kingdom of Great Britain and Ireland) Saint John Halford Coventry; 9-1 games	(United Kingdom of Great Britain and Ireland) George Parsons	(United Kingdom of Great Britain and Ireland) Alfred Edward Thompson (United Kingdom of Great Britain and Ireland) A. Tolcher	(United Kingdom of Great Britain and Ireland) Maj. H.J. Couchman (United Kingdom of Great Britain and Ireland) H.G. Hawker (United Kingdom of Great Britain and Ireland) Mr. Patrick Storey (United Kingdom of Great Britain and Ireland) Henry G. Hawker
3 - 6 Aug	South Northumberland C.C. Lawn Tennis Tournament; Sunderland, Northumberland, England; Grass; Singles - Doubles	(United Kingdom of Great Britain and Ireland) Hugh A. Taylor; 9-8, 3-6, 6-5, 4-6, unfinished	(United Kingdom of Great Britain and Ireland) Percival Clennell Fenwick	(United Kingdom of Great Britain and Ireland) C.J. Dymond (United Kingdom of Great Britain and Ireland) S. Jackson	(United Kingdom of Great Britain and Ireland) C. Elliot (United Kingdom of Great Britain and Ireland) W.R. Gibson (United Kingdom of Great Britain and Ireland) Charles Young Simpson (United Kingdom of Great Britain and Ireland) C. Welford
July - 8 Aug	Molesey Park Lawn Tennis Tournament; Molesey, Surrey, England; Grass; Singles - Doubles	(United Kingdom of Great Britain and Ireland) Charles Edmund Tatham; 6-3 6-3	(United Kingdom of Great Britain and Ireland) R. Tatham		
3 - 8 Aug.	Penarth LTC Championships; Penarth LTC; Penarth, Wales; Grass; Singles - Doubles	(England) Francis Escott Hancock; 6-4 6-2	(England) Frederick Hooper Aldrich-Blake	(England) Frederick Hooper Aldrich-Blake (Scotland) A.C. Robertson	(Wales) Percy Kemp Heard (England) Harry T. Shapley (England) Albert Francis (Frank) Stoddart (England) William Parkfield Wethered
3 - 8 Aug.	West of Ireland Championships; County Sligo Lawn Tennis Club; Ardaghowen, Sligo, Ireland; Grass; Singles - Doubles	(Ireland) Willoughby Hamilton ?	(Ireland) Rev. Edmund Lombard	(Ireland) William Drummond Hamilton	(Ireland) Effingham Carroll McDowel (United Kingdom of Great Britain and Ireland) M. White
4-8 Aug.	Wentworth Open Tournament; Hotel Wentworth; New Castle, New Hampshire, United States; Grass; Singles - Doubles	(United States) Walter Van Rensselaer Berry; 6-4, 3-6, 6-1, 6-3	(United States) Howard Augustus Taylor	(United States) William V.S. Thorne (United States) Wallace Percy Knapp	
6 -8 Aug	Canadian International Championships; Toronto, Ontario, Canada; Grass; Singles - Doubles	(United States) Joseph Sill Clark. 6-0 6-4	(Canada) Isidore Frederick Hellmuth	(United States) William Edward Glynn (Canada) Fitz James Hynes	(Canada) Alexander Galt (Canada) Alexander Monro Grier (Canada) W.W. McMaster (Canada) Henry Gordon Mackenzie
3–9 Aug	Waterford Annual Lawn Tennis Tournament; Rocklands, Waterford, Ireland; Grass; Singles - Doubles	(Ireland) Toler Roberts Garvey; 6-1, 6–0, 6-0	(United Kingdom of Great Britain and Ireland) Thomas Harrison Griffiths	(United Kingdom of Great Britain and Ireland) David Wilson Christie (Ireland) Hercules Robert Langrishe	
3–9 Aug	Waterford Annual Lawn Tennis Tournament; Rocklands, Waterford, Ireland; Grass; Singles - Doubles	Challenger (Ireland) Frederick William Knox		(United Kingdom of Great Britain and Ireland) David Wilson Christie (Ireland) Hercules Robert Langrishe	
3–9 Aug.	Seabright Invitational Tournament; Seabright Lawn Tennis and Cricket Club; Rumson, New Jersey, United States; Grass; Singles - Doubles	(United States) Joseph Sill Clark Sr. 6-4, 6-4, 6-3	(United States) H.W. Bucknall		
3–9 Aug.	Wentworth Open Tournament; New Castle, New Hampshire, United States; Grass; Singles - Doubles	(United States) Walter Van Rensselaer Berry; 8-6 7-5 6-8 6-3	(United States) Godfrey Brinley	(United States) Robert Livingston Beeckman (United States) Herbert M. Sears	
11 Aug.	Narragansette Pier Open; Narragansett, Rhode Island, United States; Grass; Singles - Doubles	(United States) Walter Van Rensselaer Berry w.o.	(United States) Henry Slocum	(United States) Quincy Shaw (United States) Charles Amherst Chase	(United States) Oliver Samuel Campbell (United States) Leib Harrison Dulles (United States) John Ryerson (United States) Albert Empie Wright
10–13 Aug.	Teignmouth and Shaldon Open; Teignmouth LTC; Teignmouth, Devon, England; Grass; Singles	(United Kingdom of Great Britain and Ireland) Wilfred Milne; 6-3, 6–5, 6-2|	(United Kingdom of Great Britain and Ireland) H.C. Kent	(United Kingdom of Great Britain and Ireland) Ferguson G. Davies (United Kingdom of Great Britain and Ireland) Erskine Gerald Watson	(United Kingdom of Great Britain and Ireland) Saint John H. Coventry (United Kingdom of Great Britain and Ireland) Stanley Riseley (United Kingdom of Great Britain and Ireland) J.C. Rogers (United Kingdom of Great Britain and Ireland) Charles Hoadley Ashe Ross
10–13 Aug.	Nahant Invitation; Nahant Sporting Club; Nahant, Massachusetts, United States; Clay; Singles - Doubles	(United States) Joseph Sill Clark ?	?		
10–14 Aug	County Carlow Lawn Tennis Tournament; Carlow, County Carlow, Ireland; Grass; Singles - Doubles	(United Kingdom of Great Britain and Ireland) H. Thorpe; 6-3, 6–5, 6-2	(Ireland) Frederick J. Smith Leckey	(Ireland) C.J. Alexander (Ireland) H. Fitzmaurice	(United Kingdom of Great Britain and Ireland) Arthur B.N. Gladwell Boyd (Ireland) Charles John Engledow (Ireland) J.E. Jameson (Ireland) K.D. Tanner
10–14 Aug	East Grinstead Lawn Tennis Club Tournament; East Grinstead, England; Grass; Singles - Doubles	(United States) James Dwight; 6-2 6-3 6-3	(United Kingdom of Great Britain and Ireland) William Nevill Cobbold	(United Kingdom of Great Britain and Ireland) Harry Grove (United Kingdom of Great Britain and Ireland) John F. Peel Rawlinson	
10–14 Aug	East Grinstead Lawn Tennis Club Tournament; East Grinstead, England; Grass; Singles - Doubles	(United Kingdom of Great Britain and Ireland) Harry Grove (United States) James Dwight; 6-1, 6-1, 6-2	(United Kingdom of Great Britain and Ireland) William Nevill Cobbold (United Kingdom of Great Britain and Ireland) William Reierson Arbuthnot	(United Kingdom of Great Britain and Ireland) Harry Grove (United Kingdom of Great Britain and Ireland) John F. Peel Rawlinson	
10–14 Aug	East Grinstead Lawn Tennis Club Tournament; East Grinstead, England; Grass; Singles - Doubles	(United Kingdom of Great Britain and Ireland) Harry Grove (United Kingdom of Great Britain and Ireland) Blanche Bingley; 7-5, 6-2	(United States) James Dwight (United Kingdom of Great Britain and Ireland) ] Margaret Bracewell	(United Kingdom of Great Britain and Ireland) Harry Grove (United Kingdom of Great Britain and Ireland) John F. Peel Rawlinson	
12–14 Aug.	Niagara International Tournament; Queen's Royal Hotel Court's; Niagara-on-the-Lake, Ontario, Canada; Grass; Singles - Doubles	(Canada) Henry Gordon Mackenzie. 6-2, 6–1, 6-1	(Canada) Robert Orr Shaw Wood	(Canada) Robert Casimir Dickson (Canada) Andrew E. Plummer	(Canada) Lawrence H. Baldwin (Canada) L.O. Dick (Canada) Sutherland MacKlem
13–15 Aug.	East of England Championships; Felixstowe Lawn Tennis Club; Felixstowe, Suffolk, England; Grass; Singles - Doubles	(United Kingdom of Great Britain and Ireland) Francis William Monement; 4-6, 6–4, 6-4	(United Kingdom of Great Britain and Ireland) Maurice Welldon	(United Kingdom of Great Britain and Ireland) T. Chilton	(United Kingdom of Great Britain and Ireland) R.C. Brockman (United Kingdom of Great Britain and Ireland) H.W. Nicholson
15–18 Aug.	Inverkip Rovers Closed Championships; Inverkip Rovers LTC; Castle Wemyss, Wemyss Bay, Scotland; Outdoor; Grass; Singles	(England) Charles H. J. Higginbotham; 6-4, 6-4, 6-2	(Scotland) George Arbuthnot Burns	(Scotland) Walter McDonald (Scotland) Archibald Thomson	(Scotland) George Kerr (England) Henry Guy Nadin (Scotland) Richard Millar Watson (Scotland) A. Graham Murray
17–19 Aug	Windermere Open; Windermere and District Lawn Tennis Club; Windermere, Westmorland, England; Grass; Singles - Doubles	(United Kingdom of Great Britain and Ireland) E.W. Brook; 5-6, 6-4, 6-1	(United Kingdom of Great Britain and Ireland) J.A. Mason	(United Kingdom of Great Britain and Ireland) R.M. Ainslie (United Kingdom of Great Britain and Ireland) H.J. Norris	(United Kingdom of Great Britain and Ireland) J.L. Bell (United Kingdom of Great Britain and Ireland) A. Hardy (United Kingdom of Great Britain and Ireland) H. Paley (United Kingdom of Great Britain and Ireland) G.C. Wrigley
18–21 Aug	Bournemouth Lawn Tennis Club Tournament; Bournemouth, England; Grass; Singles - Doubles	(United Kingdom of Great Britain and Ireland) Ernest Wool Lewis; 6–2, 6–1, 6-4	(United Kingdom of Great Britain and Ireland) Harry St John	(United Kingdom of Great Britain and Ireland) Edward Berkeley Napier	(United Kingdom of Great Britain and Ireland) Lincoln Elwes (United Kingdom of Great Britain and Ireland) Philip Elwes (United Kingdom of Great Britain and Ireland) R.D. Hodgson
18–21 Aug	Bournemouth Lawn Tennis Club Tournament; Bournemouth, England; Grass; Singles - Doubles	Challenger (United Kingdom of Great Britain and Ireland) Charles Hoadley Ashe Ross		(United Kingdom of Great Britain and Ireland) Edward Berkeley Napier	(United Kingdom of Great Britain and Ireland) Lincoln Elwes (United Kingdom of Great Britain and Ireland) Philip Elwes (United Kingdom of Great Britain and Ireland) R.D. Hodgson
18–21 Aug	Bournemouth Lawn Tennis Club Tournament; Bournemouth, England; Grass; Singles - Doubles	(United Kingdom of Great Britain and Ireland) Ernest Wool Lewis (United Kingdom of Great Britain and Ireland) Charles Hoadley Ashe Ross; 6-3, 6-2	(United Kingdom of Great Britain and Ireland) Lincoln Elwes (United Kingdom of Great Britain and Ireland) Philip Elwes	(United Kingdom of Great Britain and Ireland) Edward Berkeley Napier	(United Kingdom of Great Britain and Ireland) Lincoln Elwes (United Kingdom of Great Britain and Ireland) Philip Elwes (United Kingdom of Great Britain and Ireland) R.D. Hodgson
18–21 Aug	Bournemouth Lawn Tennis Club Tournament; Bournemouth, England; Grass; Singles - Doubles	(United Kingdom of Great Britain and Ireland) Ernest Wool Lewis (United Kingdom of Great Britain and Ireland) Miss Partner? 6-3, 4-6, 6-2	(United Kingdom of Great Britain and Ireland) Harry Saint John Hornby (United Kingdom of Great Britain and Ireland) Miss. Partner?	(United Kingdom of Great Britain and Ireland) Edward Berkeley Napier	(United Kingdom of Great Britain and Ireland) Lincoln Elwes (United Kingdom of Great Britain and Ireland) Philip Elwes (United Kingdom of Great Britain and Ireland) R.D. Hodgson
18–21 Aug.	U.S. National Championships; Newport, Rhode Island, United States; Grass; Singles - Doubles	(United States) Richard Sears; 6-3, 4–6, 6–0, 6-3	(United States) Wallace Percy Knapp	(United States) Walter Van Rensselaer Berry (United States) Joseph Sill Clark	
18–21 Aug.	U.S. National Championships; Newport, Rhode Island, United States; Grass; Singles - Doubles	Challenger (United States) Godfrey Brinley		(United States) Walter Van Rensselaer Berry (United States) Joseph Sill Clark	
17–22 Aug	Yorkshire Lawn Tennis Tournament (later Yorkshire Championships); Scarborough, Yorkshire, England; Grass; Singles - Doubles	(United Kingdom of Great Britain and Ireland) Gilbert Mahon; 6-0, 6–2, 6-4	(United Kingdom of Great Britain and Ireland) Arthur Godfrey Pease	(United Kingdom of Great Britain and Ireland) Henry Edwin Caldecott (United Kingdom of Great Britain and Ireland) W.F. Rodgers	
17–22 Aug	Yorkshire Lawn Tennis Tournament (later Yorkshire Championships); Scarborough, Yorkshire, England; Grass; Singles - Doubles	Challenger (United Kingdom of Great Britain and Ireland) E.W. Fletcher		(United Kingdom of Great Britain and Ireland) Henry Edwin Caldecott (United Kingdom of Great Britain and Ireland) W.F. Rodgers	
17–22 Aug.	South Wales and Monmouthshire Championships; Tenby LTC; Tenby, Pembrokeshire, Wales; Outdoor; Grass; Singles - Doubles	(Wales) William S. N. Heard; 5-6, 6-0, 6-0, 6-3	(Wales) E.W. Evans	(England) A. Johnston (United Kingdom of Great Britain and Ireland) A.C. Maxwell	(United Kingdom of Great Britain and Ireland) E. Webb-Bowen (United Kingdom of Great Britain and Ireland) W.L. Phillips (England) R.E. Whitehead
17–22 Aug.	Tenby Open; Tenby LTC; Tenby, Pembrokeshire, Wales; Outdoor; Grass; Singles - Doubles	(England) James Baldwin; 6-1 6-3 6-0	(Wales) S.F. Hulton	(Wales) E.W. Davies (Wales) E.W. Evans	(Wales) William Sidney Nelson Heard (United Kingdom of Great Britain and Ireland) E.M. Samson (United Kingdom of Great Britain and Ireland) A. Glover-Williams (Ireland) William George Wyld
19–22 Aug.	Braemar Lawn Tennis Tournament; Braemar LTC; Braemar, Scotland; Grass	(Scotland) Alexander Hayne; 6-4 6-4 6-3	(Scotland) Alasdair Blackwood	(Scotland) Andrew Duncan (Scotland) Bruce Elliott	
19–22 Aug	Mid Devon Lawn Tennis Tournament; Mid Devon LTC; Eggesford, Devon, England; Grass; Singles	(United Kingdom of Great Britain and Ireland) Arthur William Buckingham; 6-3 6-2 6-0	(United Kingdom of Great Britain and Ireland) S.H. Whately	(United Kingdom of Great Britain and Ireland) Mortimer Drury Buckingham (United Kingdom of Great Britain and Ireland) A.Peere Williams-Freeman	(United Kingdom of Great Britain and Ireland) E. Bray (United Kingdom of Great Britain and Ireland) W.J. Hadden (United Kingdom of Great Britain and Ireland) Robert Reginald Luxton (United Kingdom of Great Britain and Ireland) T.P. Whately
20–22 Aug	Fifeshire Lawn Tennis Association Tournament (later Fifeshire Championship); Saint Andrews College; Saint Andrews, Scotland; Grass; Singles	(Scotland) John Galbraith Horn; 6-2, 6-2	(Scotland) George Kerr	(England) S.C. Knott (Scotland) George Nelson Stenhouse	(United Kingdom of Great Britain and Ireland) C.S. Fowler (United Kingdom of Great Britain and Ireland) H.B. Harris (United Kingdom of Great Britain and Ireland) D.J. Walls
20–22 Aug	North Yorkshire Tournament; Yorkshire LTC; Scarborough, North Yorkshire, England; Grass; Singles - Doubles	(Ireland) Ernest Browne; 6-2, 6-2, 6-4	(England) E.W. Fletcher	(United States) James Dwight (England) Harold Stapylton Greenwell	(United Kingdom of Great Britain and Ireland) Arthur Edward Corner (England) Alexander Mallinson
18–22 Aug	South of Scotland Championships; Moffat, Scotland; Grass; Singles - Doubles	(Scotland) Archibald Thomson; 6-3, 6–4, 6-3	(United Kingdom of Great Britain and Ireland) B.S. Cave	(United Kingdom of Great Britain and Ireland) H. Gillbanks (Scotland) William Ferguson	(England) H.F. Adams (United Kingdom of Great Britain and Ireland) J.B. Gray (United Kingdom of Great Britain and Ireland) L. Perry (Scotland) Alfred Aitken Thomson
18–22 Aug	South of Scotland Championships; Moffat, Scotland; Grass; Singles - Doubles	(Scotland) Dudley Stuart (Scotland) Anderson Steel; 4-6, 6-4, 6-5, 6-4, 6-4	(Scotland) William Ferguson (United Kingdom of Great Britain and Ireland) N.J. Finlay	(United Kingdom of Great Britain and Ireland) H. Gillbanks (Scotland) William Ferguson	(England) H.F. Adams (United Kingdom of Great Britain and Ireland) J.B. Gray (United Kingdom of Great Britain and Ireland) L. Perry (Scotland) Alfred Aitken Thomson
18–22 Aug	South of Scotland Championships; Moffat, Scotland; Grass; Singles - Doubles	(Scotland) William Ferguson (Scotland) Miss L. Murray; 0-6, 7-5, 6-3	(United Kingdom of Great Britain and Ireland) B.S. Cave (Scotland) Miss. H. Lyell	(United Kingdom of Great Britain and Ireland) H. Gillbanks (Scotland) William Ferguson	(England) H.F. Adams (United Kingdom of Great Britain and Ireland) J.B. Gray (United Kingdom of Great Britain and Ireland) L. Perry (Scotland) Alfred Aitken Thomson
19–24 Aug.	Saxmundham Lawn Tennis Tournament; Saxmundham Lawn Tennis Club; Hurts Hill Park, Saxmundham, England; Grass; Saxmundham Lawn Tennis Tournament – Doubles	(United Kingdom of Great Britain and Ireland) Charles Richard Longe; 6-1, 6-0	(United Kingdom of Great Britain and Ireland) Herbert Davy Longe	(United Kingdom of Great Britain and Ireland) R.C. Brockman (United Kingdom of Great Britain and Ireland) C.R. Freeman	(United Kingdom) H.A. Collins (United Kingdom) Charles Sidney Cullingham (United Kingdom) G.A. Lane (United Kingdom) Henry Evelyn Tombe
24–27 Aug	Cambridgeshire Lawn Tennis Tournament; Cambridge, Cambridgeshire, England; Grass; Singles - Doubles	(United Kingdom of Great Britain and Ireland) John Frederick Peel Rawlinson; 6–3, 6–0, 7-5	(United Kingdom of Great Britain and Ireland) Lionel Robert Wilberforce	(United Kingdom of Great Britain and Ireland) Percy Bateman Brown (United Kingdom of Great Britain and Ireland) George Ernest Dixon Brown	(United Kingdom of Great Britain and Ireland) F.H. Aves (United Kingdom of Great Britain and Ireland) Edmund Henry Parker (United Kingdom of Great Britain and Ireland) Frederick Charles Martin Whitehead
24–29 Aug.	Les Grands Vaux Tournament; Caesarian LTC; Les Grands Vaux, St Saviour, Jersey; Clay/Grass; Singles	(United Kingdom of Great Britain and Ireland) Godfrey Stratton Mills; 6–3, 6–4, 7-5	(United Kingdom of Great Britain and Ireland) Harold Horsley	(United Kingdom of Great Britain and Ireland) James Lancaster (United Kingdom of Great Britain and Ireland) Sidney Kingston-Mills	(United Kingdom of Great Britain and Ireland) George Hornby (England) Harry Nuttall (England) Percy Wildman Lushington (England) Edward Lake Williams
24–29 Aug	Derbyshire Championships; Buxton, Derbyshire, England; Grass; Singles - Doubles	(Ireland) Eyre Chatterton; 5-7 6-2 6-2 5-7 6-4	(United States) James Dwight	(United Kingdom of Great Britain and Ireland) Walter Reid Craig (United Kingdom of Great Britain and Ireland) William C. Taylor	(United Kingdom of Great Britain and Ireland) T.M. Draper (United Kingdom of Great Britain and Ireland) Thomas Robinson Grey (United Kingdom of Great Britain and Ireland) Harry Grove (United Kingdom of Great Britain and Ireland) Robert C. Thompson
26–28 Aug.	Devon and Cornwall Archery Society Lawn Tennis Tournament; Manadon, Plymouth, England; Grass; Singles - Doubles	(United Kingdom of Great Britain and Ireland) Saint John Halford Coventry; 6-4 6-3	(United Kingdom of Great Britain and Ireland) H.S. Parsons	(United Kingdom of Great Britain and Ireland) W.E. Bastard (United Kingdom of Great Britain and Ireland) H. St. G. Thomas	(United Kingdom of Great Britain and Ireland) Richard W. Arthur (United Kingdom of Great Britain and Ireland) E.G. Hawker (United Kingdom of Great Britain and Ireland) W.S. Sheldon (United Kingdom of Great Britain and Ireland) E.H.A. Tolcher
24 Jul–30 Aug	Brookfield Isle of Wight Open; Brookfield, Ryde, Isle of Wight, England; Grass	(United States) James Dwight; 6-4, 1–6, 6–4, 6-2	(United Kingdom of Great Britain and Ireland) Teddy William	(United Kingdom of Great Britain and Ireland) H. Pritchard (United Kingdom of Great Britain and Ireland) Charles Hoadley Ashe Ross	(United Kingdom of Great Britain and Ireland) Herbert Chipp (United Kingdom of Great Britain and Ireland) A.W. Coomber (United Kingdom of Great Britain and Ireland) E.O. Dunn (United Kingdom of Great Britain and Ireland) E.G. Easton
24 - 29 Aug.	Whitby Open Lawn Tennis Tournament; Congress Hall Grounds; Whitby, North Yorkshire, England; Outdoor; Grass; Singles - Doubles	(United Kingdom of Great Britain and Ireland) James Herbert Crispe; 3-6, 6–1, 6–3, 6-5	(England) Arthur Godfrey Pease	(United Kingdom of Great Britain and Ireland) C.H.C. Harrison (United Kingdom of Great Britain and Ireland) Henry Bowser Wimbush	(United Kingdom of Great Britain and Ireland) William Francis Wells-Cole (United Kingdom of Great Britain and Ireland) Arthur Edward Corner (United Kingdom of Great Britain and Ireland) Leonard William Greenwell (United Kingdom of Great Britain and Ireland) George Richmond Mewburn

=== September ===
Date	Tournament	Winner	Finalist	Semi finalist	Quarter finalist
September (Autumn)	Hendon Lawn Tennis Tournament; Hendon LTC; Little Sherrock Field, Hendon, Middlesex England; Clay; Singles - Doubles	(United States) William Howard ?			
31 Aug - 2 Sep.	Burton-on-Trent Tournament; Burton-on-Trent, Staffordshire, England; Outdoor; Grass; Singles - Doubles	(United Kingdom of Great Britain and Ireland) Henry Guy Nadin; 6-4 6-3 6-0	(United Kingdom of Great Britain and Ireland) Frank Noon	(United Kingdom of Great Britain and Ireland) G.E. Lowe (England) Conway John Morgan	(England) Sydney Herbert Evershed (United Kingdom of Great Britain and Ireland) A.E. Phipps (United Kingdom of Great Britain and Ireland) H.E. Sugden
31 Aug - 2 Sep.	Burton-on-Trent Tournament; Burton-on-Trent, Staffordshire, England; Outdoor; Grass; Singles - Doubles	(United Kingdom of Great Britain and Ireland) G.E. Lowe (United Kingdom of Great Britain and Ireland) Henry Guy Nadin; 3 sets to 1	(United Kingdom of Great Britain and Ireland) Frank Noon (England) Conway John Morgan	(United Kingdom of Great Britain and Ireland) G.E. Lowe (England) Conway John Morgan	(England) Sydney Herbert Evershed (United Kingdom of Great Britain and Ireland) A.E. Phipps (United Kingdom of Great Britain and Ireland) H.E. Sugden
31 Aug - 2 Sep.	Burton-on-Trent Tournament; Burton-on-Trent, Staffordshire, England; Outdoor; Grass; Singles - Doubles	(United Kingdom of Great Britain and Ireland) Frank Noon (England) Miss Hodson divided title.	(England) Sydney Herbert Evershed (United Kingdom of Great Britain and Ireland) Mrs Evershed	(United Kingdom of Great Britain and Ireland) G.E. Lowe (England) Conway John Morgan	(England) Sydney Herbert Evershed (United Kingdom of Great Britain and Ireland) A.E. Phipps (United Kingdom of Great Britain and Ireland) H.E. Sugden
2–5 Sep	Rothesay Lawn Tennis Tournament; Craigmore Grounds; Rothesay, Isle of Bute, Argyll and Bute, Scotland; Asphalt; Singles - Doubles	(Scotland) L. McLachlan; 6-4 6-3 3-6 6-3	(United Kingdom of Great Britain and Ireland) B.H. Harris	(United Kingdom of Great Britain and Ireland) D.G. Kemp (Scotland) Horatio Babington Peile	(United Kingdom of Great Britain and Ireland) J.C. Burns (United Kingdom of Great Britain and Ireland) C.H. Nield (Scotland) Anderson Steel (United Kingdom of Great Britain and Ireland) A.W. Woodburn
3–5 Sep	West Teviotdale (Hawick) Open; Hawick Cricket Ground; Hawick, Teviotdale, Roxburghshire, Scotland; Grass; Singles - Doubles	(Scotland) George Nelson Stenhouse; 6-0, 6-3, 6-8, 6-8, 6-3	(Scotland) Richard Millar Watson	(United Kingdom of Great Britain and Ireland) S.C. Knott (Scotland) Forrester John Thomson	(United Kingdom of Great Britain and Ireland) Charles Stanislaus Constable (United Kingdom of Great Britain and Ireland) S.C. Fowler (United Kingdom of Great Britain and Ireland) Hubert Ware (United Kingdom of Great Britain and Ireland) D.J. Walls
3–5 Sep	West Teviotdale (Hawick) Open; Hawick Cricket Ground; Hawick, Teviotdale, Roxburghshire, Scotland; Grass; Singles - Doubles	(Scotland) George Nelson Stenhouse (Scotland) Richard Millar Watson; 8-6, 6-4, 6-3	(Scotland) Alfred Aitken Thomson (Scotland) Forrester John Thomson	(United Kingdom of Great Britain and Ireland) S.C. Knott (Scotland) Forrester John Thomson	(United Kingdom of Great Britain and Ireland) Charles Stanislaus Constable (United Kingdom of Great Britain and Ireland) S.C. Fowler (United Kingdom of Great Britain and Ireland) Hubert Ware (United Kingdom of Great Britain and Ireland) D.J. Walls
3–5 Sep	West Teviotdale (Hawick) Open; Hawick Cricket Ground; Hawick, Teviotdale, Roxburghshire, Scotland; Grass; Singles - Doubles	(Scotland) Richard Millar Watson (England) Miss Lottie Dod; 6-3, 4-6, 3-2 ret.	(Scotland) S.C. Scott (United Kingdom of Great Britain and Ireland) Miss Scott	(United Kingdom of Great Britain and Ireland) S.C. Knott (Scotland) Forrester John Thomson	(United Kingdom of Great Britain and Ireland) Charles Stanislaus Constable (United Kingdom of Great Britain and Ireland) S.C. Fowler (United Kingdom of Great Britain and Ireland) Hubert Ware (United Kingdom of Great Britain and Ireland) D.J. Walls
5–September. (Note: The Edgewood Country Club tournament ended 5 September 1887 exact start date missing)	Edgewood Country Club Open; Edgewood Country Club; Tivoli, New York. USA; Clay; Singles - Doubles	(United States) Valentine Gill Hall			
31 August–7 September.	United Services Tennis Club Tournament; United Service Recreation Club, Portsmouth, Hampshire, England. Grass; Singles - Doubles	(Ireland) William George Wyld; 6-2, 6-1	(United Kingdom of Great Britain and Ireland) W. Platt	(United Kingdom of Great Britain and Ireland) Major G.M. Currie (United Kingdom of Great Britain and Ireland) Francis Marwood Hext	(United Kingdom of Great Britain and Ireland) Lieut. G. Daubeny (Scotland) H. Ferguson (United Kingdom of Great Britain and Ireland) C. Poulter (United Kingdom of Great Britain and Ireland) W.L. Brooke-Smith
7–9 September	Buffalo Lawn Tennis Tournament; Summer Street Grounds; Buffalo, New York (State), United States; Grass; Singles - Doubles	(United States) A.L. Plummer ?	?		
8–11 September.	Lenox Invitation; Lenox Lawn Tennis Club; Harlem, New York, USA; Outdoor; Grass; Singles - Doubles	(United States) Walter Van Rensselaer Berry ?	(United States) Philip Shelton Sears		
9–11 September.	Downshire Lawn Tennis Tournament; Downshire LTC; Royal Hillsborough, County Down, Northern Ireland; Outdoor; Grass	(Ireland) Robert Shaw Templer; 6-4, 6-2	(Ireland) G. Macan	(Ireland) James Kinahan (Ireland) R.J. McNeill	(United Kingdom of Great Britain and Ireland) L. Bristow (United Kingdom of Great Britain and Ireland) G.H. Clarke (Ireland) J. McNeile (Ireland) Walter Francis Templer
7 - 17 Sep	South of England Championships; Eastbourne, Great Britain; Grass; Singles - Doubles	(United Kingdom of Great Britain and Ireland) Ernest Lewis; 4-6, 7–5, 6–3, 6-3	(United Kingdom of Great Britain and Ireland) William C. Taylor	(United Kingdom of Great Britain and Ireland) Edward James Avory (United Kingdom of Great Britain and Ireland) Charles Hoadley Ashe Ross	(United Kingdom of Great Britain and Ireland) J.F. Adair (United Kingdom of Great Britain and Ireland) Harry Grove (United Kingdom of Great Britain and Ireland) William Howard (United Kingdom of Great Britain and Ireland) Edward Somes Saxton
12-19 Sep.	Aldershot Division Open Lawn Tennis Tournament; Aldershot Divisional LTC; Aldershot Garrison, Hampshire, England; Outdoor; Grass; Singles	(United Kingdom) Lieut. D. Bligh; 2 sets to 1	(United Kingdom) Lieut. R. Jones.	?	?
14–20 Sep	St Leonards-on-Sea Tournament; St Leonards-on-Sea, Sussex, England; Grass; Singles - Doubles	(United Kingdom of Great Britain and Ireland) Herbert Wilberforce ?	(United Kingdom of Great Britain and Ireland) S. Wilson		
23 Sep.	Orange Invitation; Mountain Station, Montrose; South Orange, New Jersey, USA; Outdoor; Grass; Singles - Doubles	(United States) Henry Warner Slocum Jr. ?	(United States) ?		
21–26 Sep	Sussex Championships; Brighton, England; Hard; Singles - Doubles	(United Kingdom of Great Britain and Ireland) Charles Hoadley Ashe Ross w.o.	(United Kingdom of Great Britain and Ireland) William C. Taylor		
21–27 Sep	Norton Open; Norton, County Durham, England; Grass; Singles - Doubles	(United Kingdom of Great Britain and Ireland) H. A. Emmons; 4-6, 6–1, 6–2, 6-2	(United Kingdom of Great Britain and Ireland) Arthur Godfrey Pease		
29–September.	Westchester Lawn Tennis Club (Invitation); Westchester Country Club; Harrison, New York, USA; Grass; Singles - Doubles	(United States) Robert Livingston Beeckman			

=== October ===
Date	Tournament	Winner	Finalist	Semi finalist	Quarter finalist
October.	Brighton Lawn Tennis Club Tournament; Brighton Lawn Tennis Club; Queen's Park, Brighton, East Sussex, England; Grass	(United States) James Dwight; 7-5, 6–3, 7-5	(United Kingdom of Great Britain and Ireland) Charles Hoadley Ashe Ross	? ?	? ? ? ? ? ?
28 Sep-4 Oct	Southern Championships; Wilmington, NC, United States; Clay; Singles - Doubles	(United States) Charles Belmont Davis; 6-2, 6–1, 6-2	(United States) E. Porter		
8 October	Armagh Lawn Tennis Club Tournament; Armagh, Northern Ireland; Outdoor; Hard; Singles - Doubles	(Ireland) Robert Shaw Templer w.o.	(Scotland) Major Cadell (Scotland) A.D.M. Moore	(Scotland) L. Hardyman (Ireland) H. Murphy	
8 October	Armagh Lawn Tennis Club Tournament; Armagh, Northern Ireland; Outdoor; Hard; Singles - Doubles	Challenger (Ireland) Walter Francis Templer		(Scotland) L. Hardyman (Ireland) H. Murphy	
6 - 10 Oct	Victorian Championships; Melbourne, Australia; Hard; Singles - Doubles	(Australia) Walter John Carre Riddell; 25 games to 13	(Australia) Louis Whyte		
6 - 12 Oct	Intercollegiate Championships; New Haven, CT, United States; Clay; Singles - Doubles	(United States) Wallace Percy Knapp; 10-10-8, 10–8, 6-3	(United States) Augustus Duryee	(United States) W.B. Lord (United States) Lewis Henry Paddock	

=== November ===
Date	Tournament	Winner	Finalist	Semi finalist	Quarter finalist
2–7 November	Punjab Lawn Tennis Championships; Lahore, Punjab, India; Grass; Singles - Doubles	(United Kingdom of Great Britain and Ireland) Trevor Douglas Davies Berrington; 5-6 5-6 6-3 5-4 ret.	(United Kingdom of Great Britain and Ireland) F.O. Anderson	(United Kingdom of Great Britain and Ireland) F. Drake (United Kingdom of Great Britain and Ireland) A.P. Hill	(United Kingdom of Great Britain and Ireland) Edward Lee French (Scotland) H.R. Hackman (United Kingdom of Great Britain and Ireland) G. Hamilton (United Kingdom of Great Britain and Ireland) G.C. Walker
9-11 November.	S.C.C. Open Tournament; Singapore Cricket Club, Singapore, Malaya; Grass; Singles - Doubles	(Straits Settlements) Geoffrey Paulson Owen; 7-5, 6-3, 6-4	(Straits Settlements) Dr. Henry Nickleson-Smythe	(United Kingdom) Robert W. Braddell (Straits Settlements) A.P. Hill	(Straits Settlements) Jonathan Lee-Hoo (England) Norman Pendleton (Scotland) Cap. Alistair Campbell retd. (Straits Settlements) Ian Jenkins-St.Clair

=== December ===
No Events

== Sources ==
- "Abolition of Challenge Rounds". paperspast.natlib.govt.nz. EVENING POST, VOLUME CIII, ISSUE 65, 20 MARCH 1922.
- Baily's Monthly Magazine of Sports and Pastimes, and Racing Register, A.H. Baily & Company of Cornhill. London. England. 1860 to 1889.
- Hall, Valentine G[ill (1889). Lawn tennis in America. Biographical sketches of all the prominent players ... knotty points, and all the latest rules and directions governing handicaps, umpires, and rules for playing. New York, USA: New York, D. W. Granbery & co.
- Lake, Robert J. (2014). A Social History of Tennis in Britain: Volume 5 of Routledge Research in Sports History. Routledge. ISBN 9781134445578.
- McNicoll, Robin. "Biography:Riddell, Walter John (1859–1930)". adb.anu.edu.au/. Australian Dictionary of Biography, Volume 11, (MUP), 1988.
- Mazak, Karoly (2017). The Concise History of Tennis. Independently published. ISBN 9781549746475.
- Nauright, John; Parrish, Charles (2012). Sports Around the World: History, Culture, and Practice. Santa Barbara, Calif.: ABC-CLIO. ISBN 9781598843002.
- Nieuwland, Alex (2017). "Tournaments - search for a tournament - year - 1885". www.tennisarchives.com. Harlingen, Netherlands: Idzznew BV.
- Paret, Jahial Parmly; Allen, J. P.; Alexander, Frederick B.; Hardy, Samuel [from old catalog (1918). "Sectional Champions". Spalding's tennis annual . New York, American sports publishing company.
- Myers, A. Wallis, ed. Hillyard, G. W.; Mahony, H. S.; Sterry, Mrs. (1903). Lawn Tennis at Home and Abroad. New York, United States: Charles Scribner's and Sons.
- The "Field" Lawn Tennis Calendar, 1877 to 1920.
- Wright & Ditson Officially Adopted Lawn Tennis Guide. Boston, Mass, USA: Wright & Ditson. 1899.

== Attribution ==
This article contains some copied and translated content from this article Tornei di tennis maschili nel 1885 (at Italian Wikipedia)
