= Tennis Wales =

Governing body of tennis in Wales

- Tennis Cymru (Welsh)

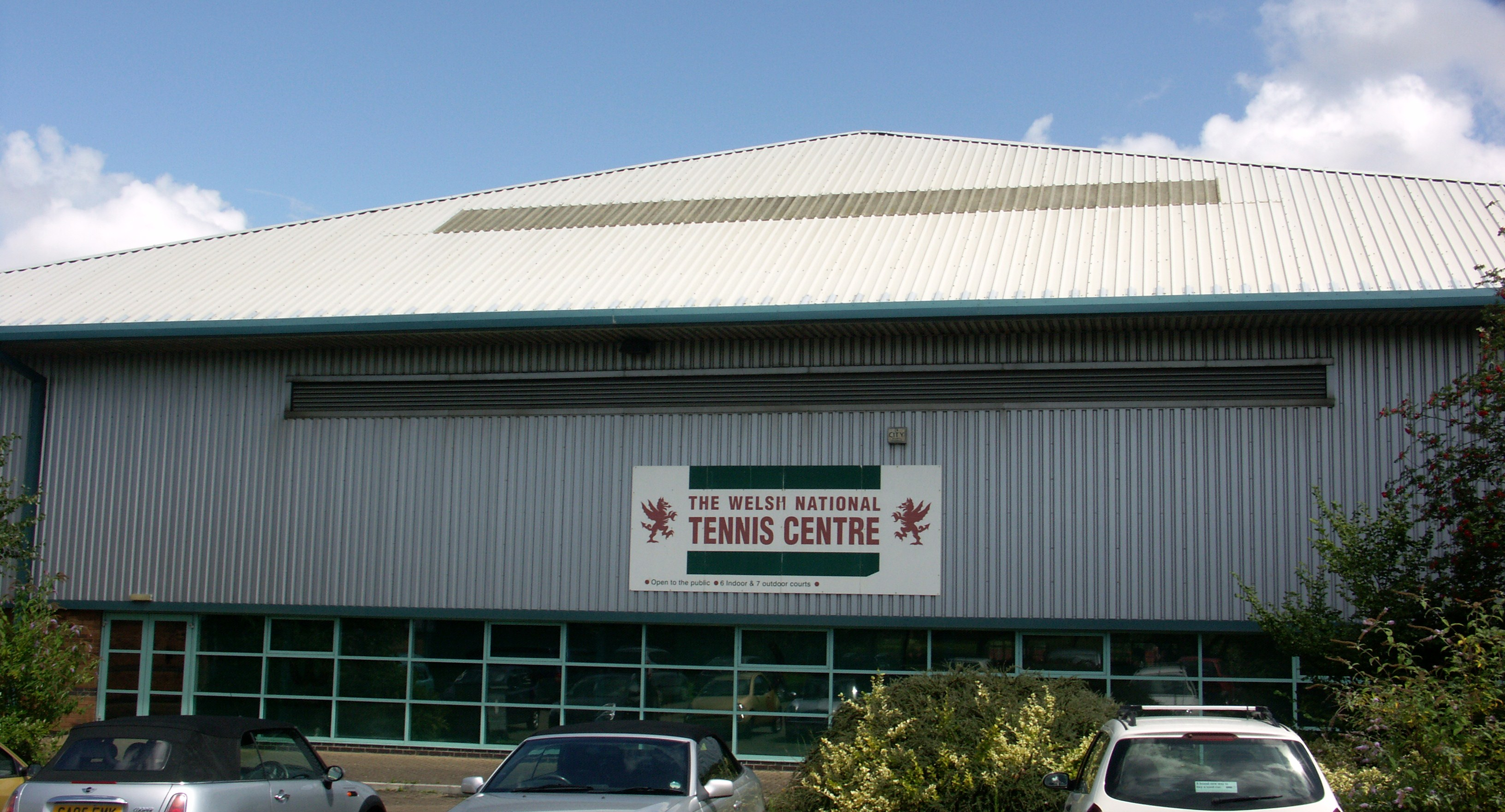
- Welsh National Tennis Centre, East Moors, Cardiff Tennis Wales' main tennis facility
- Sport: Tennis
- Abbreviation: TW
- Founded: 1887
- Location: Francis House, 2 Drake Walk, Brigantine Place, Cardiff, CF10 4AN, Wales.
- President: Amanda Sater, Baroness Sater
- Chairman: Neil O'Doherty (independent chair)
- CEO: Simon Johnson
- Secretary: Janet Evans

Official website
- www.lta.org.uk/about-us/in-your-area/tennis-wales/
- (Wales)

Tennis Wales (Welsh: Tennis Cymru) is the national governing body for tennis in Wales. It is part of the British tennis governing body, the Lawn Tennis Association. It was founded as the Welsh Lawn Tennis Association (WLTA) in 1887.

== History ==
In December 1873, Major Walter Clopton Wingfield designed an hourglass-shaped tennis court in order to obtain a patent on his court (as the rectangular court was already in use and was unpatentable). A temporary patent on this hourglass-shaped court was granted to him in February 1874, which he never renewed when it expired in 1877.

Wingfield claimed that he had invented his version of the game for the amusement of his guests at a weekend garden party on his estate of Nantclwyd Hall, in Llanelidan, North Wales in 1874. He had likely based his game on real tennis.

The first known records of organised tennis in Wales occurred in 1879, when the Newport Athletic Club mentions the formation of a tennis section affiliated to the club. In 1890 those records also mention the building of a covered court.

Some of earliest known clubs to have been established in Wales were, the Teifiside LTC (f.1879) at Newcastle Emlyn, where it staged a Teifiside LTC Championship. Tenby LTC, (f.1881) at Tenby later organised the first version of South Wales Championships, however the name of that tournament was later changed to the West Wales Championships. In North Wales the Vale of Clwyd LTC (f.1881) at Denbigh organised Vale of Clwyd CLTC Open Tournament (later called the North Wales Counties Challenge Cup from 1883 until 1884), this tournament was later revived as the first North Wales Championships at Criccieth. In August 1886 the Colwyn Bay Open Lawn Tennis Tournament was held at Pwyllycrochan Park Estate, Colwyn Bay, Denbighshire, Wales. that event ran until 1959.

In 1882 the Pensarn LTC (f.1881) in Pensarn, nr. Abergele organised the first Pensarn LTC Club Open, in 1885 that event was renamed as the North of Wales Open until around 1900. Back in South Wales the Penarth LTC, Penarth held its first tournament the Penarth LTC Championships in 1885, and the Roath LTC founded in Roath about the same time, the latter altered its name to the Cardiff Racquet and Lawn Tennis Club, and moved location to Cardiff Castle. In 1886 the first national open tennis tournament was established the Welsh Championships. In 1887 the first Welsh Lawn Tennis Association (WLTA) was founded, one year before the Lawn Tennis Association (f,1888), and eight years before the Scottish Lawn Tennis Association (f.1895).

In 1888 an annual inter-club competition, devised on a knock-out basis was established. In 1890 the Craigside Hydro Badmington and Tennis Club at Craigside, Llandudno established the Llandudno Open a grass court tennis event that ran till 1914. In 1894 the Criccieth LTC at Criccieth revived the North Wales Championships until 1939. In 1893 the first national indoor tournament played on wood courts was established at the Craigside Hydro in Llandudno called the Welsh Covered Court Championships that ran until 1955. In 1903 the format annual inter-club competition was changed to a club league system. In 1905 a revived South Wales and Monmouthshire Championships was established this time held at Newport. In 1908 the Dinas Powys LTC, in Dinas Powys was established, it held its first tournament known as the Dinas Powys Whitsun Open.

In 1911 Dinas Powys LTC also organised the first Glamorganshire Championships. In 1922 Llanelli LTC established the Carmarthenshire Championships that was part of the ILTF Circuit until 1982. In 1923 the first Welsh Junior Championships were established. In 1925 the North Wales Lawn Tennis Association (NWLTA) was founded, and in 1961 the Mid Wales Lawn Tennis Association (MWLTA) was formed. During World War II most official records of the Welsh LTA were lost. From 1968 until 1974 indoor international tennis tournaments returned to Wales with the staging of the Dewar Cup Aberavon and Dewar Cup Cardiff events that were part of the national Dewar Cup circuit.

In 2009 Tennis Wales had 98 affiliated clubs, who have just under 12,000 members between them. Tennis Wales organises junior, open and veterans' tournaments, including local and regional leagues—North Wales and South Wales—and county teams.

Until 2013 Tennis Wales was based at the Welsh National Tennis Centre, East Moors, Cardiff. Despite protests, the Centre was closed at short notice by its operator Virgin Active, and its future remains in doubt. Tennis Wales has a regional office in Wrexham.

== Governance ==
Tennis Wales is governed by a board of directors who review, monitor and support the strategic direction of the organisation via the chief executive. The Tennis Wales Board has ultimate responsibility of the affairs on the company Tennis Wales Ltd and ensuring the company is managed efficiently, effectively and in line with the requirements of the law, the rules of LTA, to consider the requirements of the LTA and Sport Wales, and the functions laid out in the company’s articles of association.

== Board of directors ==
As of 2023 included:

1. Amanda Sater, Baroness Sater – president
2. Neil O'Doherty – independent chair
3. Simon Johnson – CEO
4. Janet Evans – company secretary
5. Patsy Roseblade – independent member
6. James Armstrong – independent member
7. Hannah Ward – independent member
8. Lucy Scott – board member (North)
9. Michael Gibson – board member (North)
10. Sophie Hughes – board member (South)
11. Bethan Lewis – board member (South)
12. Anthony Phillips – board member (South)
13. Nigel Osborne – board member (South)
14. Simon Clarke – LTA councillor
15. Lucy Cohen – independent member

== See also ==
- Lawn Tennis Association
- Tennis Scotland
