= Tenby Open =

Defunct tennis tournament
- Tour: WLTA Circuit
- Founded: 1876; 149 years ago
- Abolished: 1895; 130 years ago
- Location: Tenby, Pembrokeshire, South Wales
- Venue: Tenby Lawn Club Tennis Club
- Surface: Grass

The Tenby Open was a men's and women's grass court tennis tournament founded in 1876 as the Tenby Lawn Tennis Club Tournament. In 1881 the event was re branded as the South Wales Championships. In 1885 a new open tournament was revived staged annually at the Tenby Lawn Club Tennis Club, Tenby, Pembrokeshire, South Wales. The tournament was staged annually until 1895 when it was discontinued.

== History ==
In 1876 the Tenby Lawn Tennis Club Tournament was first staged at the Tenby Lawn Tennis Club, Tenby, Pembrokeshire, South Wales. In 1881 the tournament changed its name to the South Wales Championships, and play was open to all residents who had resided for three months in all six southern counties of Wales. In 1885 a new tournament was revived the Tenby Open. The tournament was staged annually until 1895 when it was discontinued.

== Finals ==
=== Men's singles ===
(Incomplete list)

Tenby Open
Year	Winners	Runners-up	Score
1885	(England) James Baldwin	(Wales) S.F. Hulton	6–1, 6–3, 6–0
1886	(England) James Baldwin (2)	(United Kingdom of Great Britain and Ireland) E.W. David	6–0, 6–1, 6–1
1887	(Wales) David G. Owen Saunders	(United Kingdom of Great Britain and Ireland) Captain G.R. Taylor	6–5, 6–2, 6–1
1888	(Wales) William Sidney Nelson Heard	(United Kingdom of Great Britain and Ireland) E.W. David	6–2, 6–2, 6–1
