= Plymouth Open =

Defunct tennis tournament
- Tour: LTA Circuit
- Founded: 1882; 143 years ago
- Abolished: 1894; 131 years ago
- Location: West Hoe, Plymouth, England.
- Venue: West Hoe Lawn Tennis Club
- Surface: Grass

The Plymouth Open also known as the West Hoe Open Tournament was men's and women's grass court tennis tournament founded in 1882. It was organised by the West Hoe Lawn Tennis Club, and played at the West Hoe Recreation Ground, West Hoe, Plymouth, England. The tournament was played until at least 1894.

== History ==
In 1882 the West Hoe Lawn Tennis Tournament was established. By 1884 the tournament was branded as the Plymouth Open, and played at the West Hoe grounds Plymouth, England. The tournament was held annually till around 1894 with the last known event being staged.

West Hoe is an area of Plymouth in the English county of Devon. In the 19th century the West Hoe Recreation Ground was in the center of this Victorian era housing development. The West Hoe Lawn Tennis Club no longer exits, however its successor the West Hoe Park Lawn Tennis Club is located in the same place. West Hoe Recreation Grounds was renamed to West Hoe Park in 1900. The event was part of the LTA Circuit from 1888 to 1894.
