= Amanda Sater, Baroness Sater =

British marketing executive and magistrate (born 1963)

The Right Honourable The Baroness Sater

Member of the House of Lords
- Lord Temporal
- Life peerage 20 June 2018

Personal details
- Born: Amanda Jacqueline Sater; 21 June 1963 (age 63)
- Party: Conservative

Amanda Jacqueline Sater, Baroness Sater (born 21 June 1963) is a British marketing executive and magistrate. Sater has sat on several charitable boards.

== Career ==
Sater's professional career was spent in marketing and she has been a director of the Institute of Sales Promotion.

Sater has served on the boards of several organisations including Addaction, the British Lung Foundation, the Youth Justice Board, and the Metropolitan Police Authority. Sater has served as chair of the charity StreetGames and the Queen's Club Foundation. In her youth Sater was a Welsh county and national tennis player and took part on the junior tennis tour. She is currently president of Tennis Wales.

Sater has served as a magistrate and has sat for 16 years on the Inner London Youth Bench.

== Recognition ==
Sater was nominated for a life peerage by Theresa May in May 2018. On 20 June, she was created Baroness Sater, of Kensington in the Royal Borough of Kensington and Chelsea. Her official title is The Baroness Sater.

Orders of precedence in the United Kingdom
Preceded by The Baroness Meyer	Ladies; Baroness Sater	Followed by The Baroness Bryan of Partick
