= Fylde Tournament =

Defunct tennis tournament
- Founded: 1885; 141 years ago
- Abolished: 1914; 112 years ago
- Location: Lytham St Annes, Lancashire, England
- Venue: Lytham Cricket Club Ground
- Surface: Grass

The Fylde Tournament also known as the Fylde Tennis Tournament was a grass court tennis tournament founded in 1885 by the Fylde Lawn Tennis Club and first played at the Lytham Cricket Club Ground, Lytham St Annes, Lancashire, England. The tournament was played at until 1914.

== History ==
On 5 August 1885 the Fylde Lawn Tennis Club established the Fylde Tennis Tournament. The event was held in Lytham at this time a separate town. In 1922 it was amalgamated with St. Annes-on-Sea another town to form a new town Lytham St Annes. The tournament was always staged at the Lytham Cricket Club Ground. The event ran annually until 1914 when it was discontinued due to World War One.

== See also ==
- St. Annes Open (another tennis tournament played in Lytham St Annes between 1932 and 1974).
