= Northumberland Cricket Club Open =

Defunct tennis tournament
- Founded: 1884; 141 years ago
- Abolished: 1893; 132 years ago
- Location: Gosforth, Newcastle upon Tyne, Northumberland, England
- Venue: South Northumberland Cricket Club
- Surface: Grass

The Northumberland Cricket Club Open was a Victorian era men's and women's grass court tennis tournament founded in 1884. The tournament was first held at the South Northumberland Cricket Club grounds, Gosforth, Newcastle upon Tyne, Northumberland, England, The event was staged annually until 1893 when it was discontinued.

== History ==
In 1864 the first South Northumberland Cricket Club was founded at Gosforth, Northumberland. In 1882 the first Northumberland County Championships were held at the club grounds. In 1884 the club decided to establish its own lawn tennis tournament called the Northumberland Cricket Club Open. In 1893 the cricket club held its final edition of the open tournament and was discontinued.
