= United Services TC Open =

United Services Tennis Club Open

Defunct tennis tournament
- Founded: 1880; 145 years ago
- Abolished: 1932; 93 years ago
- Location: Portsmouth, Hampshire, England.
- Venue: United Services Recreation Ground
- Surface: Grass/Clay

The United Services Tennis Club Open was a grass then later clay court tennis tournament open tennis tournament organised by the United Services L.T.C. and played at the United Services Recreation Ground, Portsmouth, Hampshire, England. It was established in 1880. The tournament was played annually at until 1932.

== History ==
IThe United Services Club Tournament was open tennis tournament for military and civilian lawn tennis players organised by the United Services L.T.C. and played at the United Services Recreation Ground, Portsmouth, Hampshire, England. It was first established in 1880. The event was initially played on grass courts switching to clay courts in the 1920s. The tournament was staged annually with exception of World War One until 1932.

== Finals ==
=== Men's singles ===
(incomplete roll)

Year	Winner	Finalist	Score
1885	(United Kingdom of Great Britain and Ireland) William George Wyld	(United Kingdom of Great Britain and Ireland) Wilfred A. Platt	6-2, 6–1.
1886	(United Kingdom of Great Britain and Ireland) H.M. Nicholls	(United Kingdom of Great Britain and Ireland) Henry Blane Porter	6-2, 6–3.
1887	(United Kingdom of Great Britain and Ireland) Wilfred L. Parker	(United Kingdom of Great Britain and Ireland) Lionel G. Campbell	6-2, 3–6, 6–3.
1888	(United Kingdom of Great Britain and Ireland) Frederick Wentworth Gore	(United Kingdom of Great Britain and Ireland) Lt. Col G.M. Currie	6-5, 6–1.
1892	(United Kingdom of Great Britain and Ireland) Ernest Wool Lewis	(United Kingdom of Great Britain and Ireland) Ernest George Meers	6-4, 6–4.
1893	(United Kingdom of Great Britain and Ireland) Ernest Wool Lewis	(United Kingdom of Great Britain and Ireland) Wilfred Baddeley	6-4, 6–4.
1906	(Germany) Roderick Fraser Kälberer	(United Kingdom of Great Britain and Ireland) Lawrence Francis Davin	6-2, 6–2.
