= Cambridgeshire Lawn Tennis Tournament =

Defunct tennis tournament
- Founded: 1884; 142 years ago
- Abolished: 1892; 134 years ago
- Location: Cambridge, Cambridgeshire, England
- Venue: Cambridge University Lawn Tennis Club
- Surface: Grass

The Cambridgeshire Lawn Tennis Tournament was a tennis tournament first established in 1884 at Cambridge, Cambridgeshire, England, and played on outdoor grass courts. The tournament was played until 1892.

== History ==
Cambridge University Lawn Tennis Club (f.1881) is one of the oldest tennis clubs in the world. The Club acts as the tennis association for whole of the University of Cambridge, representing thirty-one Colleges. In 1884, the Cambridge University LTA established the Cambridgeshire Lawn Tennis Tournament. The tournament was held annually through to 1889, when it was discontinued. In 1890, the Selford Lawn Tennis Club in Great Shelford, was host for the tournament until 1891, when that too was discontinued. The tournament served as the precursor event to the later Cambridgeshire County Lawn Tennis Championships established by the Cambridgeshire LTA in 1906.

== See also ==
- Cambridge University LTC Tournament
- The Doherty Cup
