= Canterbury Championships =

Tennis tournament in New Zealand

Defunct tennis tournament
- Founded: 1885; 140 years ago
- Abolished: 2014; 11 years ago
- Location: Christchurch, Canterbury, New Zealand.
- Venue: Canterbury Lawn Tennis Club
- Surface: Grass

The Canterbury Championships was a regional grass court tennis tournament. Founded in 1882 as the Canterbury Championship, it was first formally staged in 1885. The tournament was played at the Canterbury Lawn Tennis Club (founded 1881), at Christchurch, New Zealand. The championships were staged annually until 2014.

== History ==
The Canterbury Lawn Tennis Club was first established in 1881. In 1882 the club staged the first Canterbury Championship that was won by Frederick Wilding the father of Anthony Wilding. In 1885 following the creation of New Zealand Lawn Tennis Association and its associated regional LTA's including the Canterbury LTA it became an officially sanctioned tournament.

Although an open event for all comers the championships mainly featured players from within New Zealand, but also from Australia. It became more internationalised following the World War II and in part due to commercial jet airliners making the time to travel to New Zealand shorter, it became part of the worldwide ILTF Circuit.

The tournament was downgraded as a Satellite Tournament during the 1980s. By the 2000s it was chiefly a localised Tennis New Zealand event. Multiple New Zealand winners of the men's and women's singles titles include Richard Harman, May Spiers, Joy Marshall, Thelma Poole, Jean MacGibbon and Robyn Legge Hunt. International winners of the women's singles include Rita Bentley, Kathy Harter and Mary Struthers.
