= West of Ireland Tennis Open Championships =

Tournament information
- Founded: 1882; 143 years ago
- Location: Sligo; Ireland
- Venue: Sligo Tennis Club
- Surface: Grass court
- Website: https://www.sligotennisclub.ie/

The West of Ireland Tennis Open Championships originally known as the Championship of the West of Ireland also West of Ireland Championships is a combined men's and women's grass court tennis tournament. The first championships were played in 1882 at the County Sligo Lawn Tennis Club, Sligo, Connacht, Ireland.

== History ==
Organised tennis in Sligo goes back as far as 1881 when one of the oldest clubs in the country played on grass courts at Ardaghowen, Sligo. The first staging of the West of Ireland Championships which was an open event for men and women were first held in 1882. The origins of the present day West of Ireland Championships are directly linked to the first open tournament at this club in 1882.

The tournament was not staged for twenty five years between 1959 and 1986 when it resumed. In the 1990s the tournament went under the name of the Carlsberg West of Ireland Open Championships for sponsorship reason. The West of Ireland Tennis Open Championships are still being held annually today on artificial grass courts. and forms part of the annual Tennis Ireland tour as a 500 category event.

Former notable winners of the men's singles has included Wimbledon Champion Willoughby Hamilton who won the men's singles championships in (1885, 1886, 1888).

== Sources ==
- Sligo Champion. Mediahuis Ireland. 12 May 1999.
- Sligo Independent. (Saturday 12 July 1884). Sligo, Ireland.
- Tennis Ireland Tour 2022 Calendar". www.tennisireland.ie. Tennis Ireland.
- The West of Ireland Tennis Open Championships. (1 April 2022). www.sligotennisclub.ie. Sligo, Republic of Ireland: Sligo Tennis Club.
