= Punjab Lawn Tennis Championships =

Defunct tennis tournament
- Tour: Pre open era
- Founded: 1885; 141 years ago
- Abolished: 1967; 59 years ago
- Location: Lahore, Punjab, India (1885-1947); Lahore, West Punjab, Pakistan (1947-1967)
- Venue: Lahore Gymkhana Club; Lawrence Hall Gardens
- Surface: Grass (outdoor)

The Punjab Lawn Tennis Championships also known as the Punjab Championships was a men's and women's grass court tennis tournament established in 1885. It was held at the Lahore Gymkhana Club, Lahore, Punjab in what was then India, before it became part of Pakistan, that was usually staged in December each year and ran until 1967.

== History ==
The Punjab Lawn Tennis Championships was a grass court tennis tournament established in 1885 at the Lahore Gymkhana Club. Lahore Gymkhana Club, Lahore, Punjab in what was then India, then later Pakistan and ran until 1967. The winner of the first men's singles title was England's Trevor D. D. Berrington. In 1887 a ladies event was staged for the first time the singles title was won by a Miss Warburton. Between 1894 and 1896 no men's championships were staged. and between 1891 and 1903 no ladies event was staged.

Until 1914 the tournament was mainly won by British players, that year the first Indian born female finalist was Bibi Amrit Kaur. In 1915 native born Indian player Mohammed Sleem was the first non European male player to win this title, and would go on to win this championship a record 13 times including 8 consecutive titles from (1915,17, 1919-26, 1928,29,31). In the early 1950s, Amritsar, in East Punjab, India, became the host city for what would soon be the newly named Punjab State Championships. From the late 1950s until the late 1960s more international players won this event including Australias Fred Stolle in 1962. In 1962 the last known winner of the Women's singles title was Australia's Madonna Schacht. In 1967 the tournament was abolished and the final men's champion was West Germany's Harald Elschenbroich.
