= South Northumberland Open =

Defunct tennis tournament
- Founded: 1885; 140 years ago
- Abolished: 1977; 48 years ago
- Location: Gosforth, Newcastle upon Tyne, Tyne and Wear, England
- Surface: Grass

The South Northumberland Open was a combined men's and women's grass court tennis tournament founded in 1885 as the South Northumberland C.C. Lawn Tennis Tournament. It was originally played at Gosforth, Newcastle upon Tyne, Northumberland, England until 1977 when it was of ILTF tour.

== History ==
The South Northumberland C.C. Lawn Tennis Tournament was established in 1885, and played at the South Northumberland Cricket Club (f.1864) grounds at Gosforth Newcastle upon Tyne, Northumberland, England. The tournament was supspended twice during World War I and World War II During the 1930s and late 1940s it was known as the South Northumberland Open Tennis Tournament. It ran until 1977.

== Current status ==
The South Northumberland Open is still operating today as a sub regional tennis event, it is held at the Northumberland Club, Newcastle upon Tyne, England.
