= Brincliffe Open =

Defunct tennis tournament
- Tour: British & Irish Circuit
- Founded: 1885
- Editions: 1927
- Location: Bramall Lane, Sheffield, West Riding, England
- Venue: Brincliffe Lawn Tennis Club
- Surface: Grass (outdoor); Hard (outdoor)

The Brincliffe Open was an outdoor men's and women's grass court and hard court tennis tournament first staged in June 1885 by the Brincliffe Lawn Tennis Club (f.1883), at Bramall Lane, Sheffield, West Riding, England. The tournament ran until 1927.

== History ==
The Brincliffe Lawn Tennis Club Tournament was an outdoor grass court men's and women's tennis tournament organised by Mr. W. Pierce Dix in conjunction with Brincliffe Lawn Tennis Club (f.1883). Brincliffe LTC was already staging matches in 1884. The first edition was staged from 18 to 20 June 1885 at the County Cricket Ground, Bramall Lane, Sheffield, West Riding, England. Mr. N. L. Jackson (editor of Baily's Monthly Magazine of Sports and Pastimes, and Racing Register) was invited to officiate as referee.

Notable gentleman players participating in the 1885 tournament, included Wimbledon singles finalist and two doubles champion Ernest Renshaw., Ernest Wool Lewis the South of England Championships title holder, and Ireland's Ernest Browne the Wimbledon singles finalist.

The first men's singles title was won by America's James Dwight who defeated Britain's Arthur John Stanley. The women's singles title was won by Beatrice Wood who defeated Florence Mardall. In 1927 Phyllis Satterthwaite played at the tournament.

== Venue ==
The Brincliffe Lawn Tennis Club was established in 1883 at Cemetery Road, Sharrow, Sheffield where it remained until 1901 when it moved to Brincliffe Hill. In 1924 according to the Yorkshire Lawn Tennis Association the club consisted of six grass courts and four hard courts, The annual tournament was still being played as late as 1927.

== Finals ==
=== Mens Singles ===
Year	Winner	Finalist	Score
1885	(United States) James Dwight	(England) Arthur John Stanley	2-6, 6–1, 6–3, 6-4

=== Mens Doubles ===
Year	Winner	Runner-up	Score
1885	(England) Charles Lacy Sweet (England) Ernest Renshaw	(United States) Gilbert Mahon (England) Arthur John Stanley	?

=== Women's Singles ===
Year	Winner	Runner-up	Score
1885	(United Kingdom) Beatrice Wood	(England) Florence Louisa Mardall	6-1, 6-0

=== Mix Doubles ===
Year	Winner	Runner-up	Score
1885	(England) John Charles Kay (England) Florence Louisa Mardall	(United States) Hamilton A. Emmons (United Kingdom) Miss Hobson	7-5, 3–6, 6-4

== Sources ==
- Andrews. John (2015) Lost Club Brincliffe. (PDF). sdlta.org.uk. Sheffield and District Lawn Tennis Association.
- Goy's calendar of sports (1884). Sporting and Club Fixtures. London: Illustrated Sport.
- Lusis, Andy. "Brincliffe's tournament" (PDF). sdlta.org.uk. Sheffield and District Lawn Tennis Association.
- Nieuwland, Alex. "Edition – Brincliffe Lawn Tennis Club Tournament 1885". www.tennisarchives.com. Netherlands: Tennis Archives.
