= Edgewood Country Club Open =

Defunct tennis tournament
- Founded: 1885; 141 years ago
- Abolished: 1916; 110 years ago
- Location: Tivoli, New York, United States
- Venue: Edgewood Country Club
- Surface: Clay

The Edgewood Country Club Open also known as the Tivoli Open was a tennis tournament first established in 1885 at Tivoli, New York, United States and played at the Edgewood Country Club on clay courts. It was part of the U.S. lawn tennis circuit until 1916.

== History ==
The Edgewood Country Club Open was a tennis tournament first established in 1885 at Tivoli, New York, United States and played on clay courts at the Edgewood Country Club Open, originally founded as the Tivoli Lawn Tennis Club of which one of the founding members was Valentine Gill Hall. It was part of the U.S. lawn tennis circuit until 1916.

== Finals ==
=== Men's Singles ===
- 1885— (United States) Valentine Gill Hall def. ?
- 1886— (United States) Valentine Gill Hall def. ?
- 1887— (United States) Valentine Gill Hall def. ?
- 1916— (United States) Frank Brown Ransom def. (United States) Michael Whitehead, 1–6, 6–3, 8–6, 4–6, 10–8

== Venue ==
In 1883 the Tivoli Lawn Tennis Club was established the name was later changed to the Edgewood Country Club.
