= Athboy Open =

Defunct tennis tournament
- Founded: 1885; 140 years ago
- Abolished: 1959; 66 years ago
- Location: Athboy, County Meath, Ireland
- Venue: Athboy Lawn Tennis Club
- Surface: Grass

The Athboy Open was a grass court tennis tournament founded in 1885 as the Athboy LTC Open Tournament and was first hosted at the Athboy Cricket Club Grounds in Athboy, County Meath, Ireland. The tournament was held annually until 1959.

== History ==
On 31 July 1885 the Athboy Lawn Tennis Club established the Athboy Lawn Tennis Club Open Tournament. The first edition was played on laid out courts at the Athboy Cricket Club Grounds. The tournament was held until 1960 when following a meeting of the clubs committee and falling member numbers the tournament was discontinued. The club continued to hold handicap events through the remainder of the early 1960s.
