= Litchfield Open =

Defunct tennis tournament
- Founded: 1885; 141 years ago
- Abolished: 1904; 122 years ago
- Location: Litchfield, Connecticut, United States
- Venue: Litchfield Lawn Tennis Club,
- Surface: Clay

The Litchfield Open was a tennis tournament first established in 1885 by the Litchfield Lawn Tennis Club, Litchfield, Connecticut, United States, and played on outdoor clay courts. The tournament was played at until 1904.

== History ==
In 1878 the Litchfield Lawn Club was founded to provide the following sports, croquet, bowling, tennis and social events. In 1885 it established the Litchfield Open tennis event to be played at Litchfield, Connecticut, United States on grass courts. On August 29, 1892, the Litchfield Lawn Club changed its name to the Litchfield Country Club. In 1905 the Litchfield Open was discontinued as the club became host for venue for the Connecticut State Championships, which was founded in 1895 until 1914.
