= Fifeshire Championship =

Defunct tennis tournament
- Founded: 1884; 141 years ago
- Abolished: 1914; 111 years ago
- Location: Cupar; Saint Andrews; Kirkcaldy
- Venue: Duffus LTC; St. Andrews LTC; Kircaldy LTC

The Fifeshire Championship was men's and women's grass court tennis tournament founded in 1884 as the Fifeshire Lawn Tennis Association Tournament. It was first played at Saint Andrews College, Saint Andrews, Scotland The tournament was staged annually until 1914 when it was discontinued due to World War One.

== History ==
The Fifeshire Lawn Tennis Association Tournament was established in 1884 at St. Andrews, Scotland. It was administered by the Fifeshire Lawn Tennis Association, at this point not officially incorporated until 1922. The tournament was staged annually until 1914 when it was discontinued due to World War One. The tournament was staged at various venues during its run including Cupar, Kirkcaldy,
