= Molesey Park Lawn Tennis Tournament =

Defunct tennis tournament
- Tour: LTA Circuit
- Founded: 1885; 140 years ago
- Abolished: 1888; 137 years ago
- Editions: 3
- Location: Molesey, Surrey, England.
- Venue: Molesey Park
- Surface: Grass

The Molesey Park Lawn Tennis Tournament was a men's and women's grass court tennis tournament organised by the Molesey Park Lawn Tennis Club and first held in August 1885 at Molesey Park, Molesey, Surrey, England. The tournament ran for three editions until 1887.

== History ==
The Molesey Park Lawn Tennis Tournament was first established on 8 August 1885 and was played 15 August 1885. The first gentleman's singles was won by Charles Edmund Tatham who had previously won the Holt LTC Tournament in Norfolk, he defeated his brother Ralph Tatham in the final.

== Finals ==
=== Men's singles ===
(Incomplete roll):

Year	Winner	Finalist	Score
1885	(United Kingdom of Great Britain and Ireland) Charles Edmund Tatham	(United Kingdom of Great Britain and Ireland) Ralph Tatham	6-3, 6–3.
1886	(United Kingdom of Great Britain and Ireland) Harry Sibthorpe Barlow	(United Kingdom of Great Britain and Ireland) Percy Bateman Brown	6-2, 6–4.
1887	(United Kingdom of Great Britain and Ireland) Arthur Wellesley Hallward	(United Kingdom of Great Britain and Ireland) Charles Hoadley Ashe Ross	6-5, 6–1.

=== Women's singles ===
Year	Winner	Finalist	Score
1885	(United Kingdom of Great Britain and Ireland) Miss Charlote Cobbold	(United Kingdom of Great Britain and Ireland) Miss Joyce Wray	6-2, 6–2.
