= Hendon Lawn Tennis Tournament =

Defunct tennis tournament
- Founded: 1882; 143 years ago
- Abolished: 1889; 136 years ago
- Location: Hendon, Middlesex, England
- Venue: Hendon Lawn Tennis Club
- Surface: Clay

The Hendon Lawn Tennis Tournament was a men's clay court tennis tournament organised by the Hendon Lawn Tennis Club, Little Sherrock Field, Hendon, Middlesex, England from 1882 to 1889.

== History ==
The Hendon Lawn Tennis Tournament was a men's clay court tennis tournament organised by the Hendon LTC, Hendon Park, Little Sherrock Field (today known as Sherrock Gardens), Hendon, Middlesex, England from 1882 to 1889.

== Finals ==
=== Men's Singles ===
(Incomplete roll)

Year	Winners	Runners-up	Score
1882	(Scotland) Herbert Lawford	(United Kingdom) Otway Woodhouse	6–4, 6–4, 6–1
1885	(United States) William Howard	(United Kingdom) John Muir MacDonald	6–4, 6–4
1886	(United States) William Howard	(United Kingdom) Patrick W. Squire	6–2, 3–6, 6–1
1889	(United Kingdom) Leopold Maxse	(England) Harry Grove	6–4, 3–6, 6–3, 2–6, 6–4
