= Young America Cricket Club Invitation =

Defunct tennis tournament
- Tour: USLTA Circuit (1885-1887)
- Founded: 1885; 140 years ago
- Abolished: 1887; 138 years ago
- Location: Stanton, Philadelphia, Pennsylvania, United States
- Venue: Young America Cricket Club
- Surface: Grass

The Young America Cricket Club Invitation was a late 19th-century men's grass court tennis tournament held at the Young America Cricket Club (YACC), Stanton, Philadelphia, Pennsylvania, United States from 1885 to 1895.

== History ==
In 1855 the Young America Cricket Club (YACC) was founded. In 1885 the club inaugurated an invitational men's tennis tournament known as the Young America Cricket Club Invitation. This important event was only held for three editions. The tournament was discontinued as following the merger of the Young America Cricket Club with another famous venue the Germantown Cricket Club in 1889.

== Finals ==
=== Men's singles ===
Year	Champion	Runner up	Score
1885 (Note: 1885 edition held from 26–29 May)	(United States) Joseph Sill Clark Sr.	(United States) Clarence Munroe Clark	6-3, 6-3, 6-2.
1886 (Note: 1886 edition held from 4–5 June)	(United States) Robert Livingston Beeckman	(United States) Joseph Sill Clark Sr.	6-4,6-4, 9-7.
1887 (Note: 1886 edition held from 27–29 May)	(United States) Howard Augustus Taylor	(United States) Robert Livingston Beeckman	6-3, 2-6, 6-4, 5-7, 6-1.
