= Norton Open =

Defunct tennis tournament
- Founded: 1883; 142 years ago
- Abolished: 1933; 92 years ago
- Location: Norton, Stockton-on-Tees, County Durham, England
- Venue: Norton Cricket Club Grounds
- Surface: Grass

The Norton Open was a men's and women's grass court tennis tournament founded in 1883 as Norton Lawn Tennis Tournament. The tournament was organised annually by the Norton Lawn Tennis Club and Norton Lawn Tennis Association, and was played on the Norton Cricket Club grounds at Norton, Stockton-on-Tees, County Durham, England. The tournament ran until 1933 when it was discontinued.

== History ==
In 1883 the Norton Lawn Tennis Tournament was established as a men's tennis event. In 1885 a women's event was added to the schedule and the tournament was renamed as the Norton Lawn Tennis Open Tournament. The Norton Tennis Tournament was staged at Norton, Stockton-on-Tees, County Durham, England.

This annual tournament staged two events per year the Norton Open for men and women, and Northern Counties Challenge Cup for men. The tournament was organised by the Norton Lawn Tennis Association and ran annually until 1933 when it was discontinued due to the event being dropped by the County Durham Lawn Tennis Association (today called the Durham & Cleveland LTA) along with events the Royton Open and Darlington Open.
