= Acton Vale LTC Open =

Defunct tennis tournament
- Founded: 1885; 141 years ago
- Abolished: 1891; 135 years ago
- Location: East Acton, London, England.
- Venue: Acton Vale Lawn Tennis Club
- Surface: Grass

The Acton Vale LTC Open was a grass court tennis tournament held in Acton Vale LTC, East Acton, London, England from 1885 to 1891.

== History ==
The Acton Vale Open tennis tournament was established in June 1885. The tournament attracted many prominent players with singles draw averaging 32. The tournament was held annually until 1891 then was discontinued due to a compulsory purchase order being issued by the local authority to redevelop the land. The club moved to a new location but the event never recovered.

== Finals ==
=== Men's singles ===
Incomplete roll:

Year	Winner	Finalist	Score
1885	(United Kingdom of Great Britain and Ireland) Ernest Wool Lewis	(United Kingdom of Great Britain and Ireland) Herbert Chipp	7-5, 6–2, 7–5.
1886	(United Kingdom of Great Britain and Ireland) Ernest Wool Lewis	(United Kingdom of Great Britain and Ireland) Ernest George Meers	6-2, 6–2, 6–2.
1888	(United Kingdom of Great Britain and Ireland) Ernest George Meers	(United Kingdom of Great Britain and Ireland) Charles Gladstone Eames	6-1, 6–1, 6–2.
1890	(United Kingdom of Great Britain and Ireland) Herbert Chipp	(United Kingdom of Great Britain and Ireland) Wilberforce Eaves	6-4, 3–6, 1–6, 6–2, 6–4.
1891	(United Kingdom of Great Britain and Ireland) Herbert Chipp	(United Kingdom of Great Britain and Ireland) James Herbert Crispe	6-4, 6–4, 2–6, 3–6, 6–1.
