= East Orange Open =

Defunct tennis tournament
- Tour: USNLTA Circuit
- Founded: 1885; 140 years ago
- Abolished: 1889; 136 years ago
- Editions: 5
- Location: East Orange, New Jersey, US
- Venue: East Orange Athletic Club Grounds
- Surface: Outdoor (grass)

The East Orange Open was a late 19th-century combined grass court tennis tournament held at the East Orange Tennis Club, East Orange, New Jersey, United States.

== History ==
The East Orange Club Amateur Tournament was a late 19th-century men's grass court tennis tournament held at the East Orange Athletic Club Grounds, East Orange, New Jersey, United States founded in 1885 that ran annually for two editions. It was part of the USNLTA Circuit. The tournament was replaced by an indoor tennis event in 1888 called the East Orange Club Covered Courts Tournament that ran till 1895.

== Finals ==
=== Men's singles ===
(Incomplete list)

| Year | Winner | Finalist | Score |
|---|---|---|---|
| 1885. | (United States) Patrick Lyman | (United States) Wallace Percy Knapp | 6–4, 6–3, 6–3. |
| 1886 | (United States) Oliver Samuel Campbell | (United States) Robert Livingston Beeckman | 6–2, 4–6, 6–3, 6–4. |

== See also ==
- Orange Fall Open
- Orange Invitational
- South Orange Open

== Sources ==
- Hall, Valentine Gill (1889). Lawn tennis in America. Biographical sketches of all the prominent players ... knotty points, and all the latest rules and directions governing handicaps, umpires, and rules for playing. New York, USA: New York, D. W. Granbery & co.
- Holland, W. B. (1889). Outing Magazine: The Outdoor Magazine of Human Interest. Boston: Outing Publishing Company.
