= Church Road Ground =

Cricket ground in Lytham, Lancashire, England

Coordinates: 53.73806°N 2.97286°W

Ground information
- Location: Lytham St Annes, Lancashire
- Establishment: 1844
- End names
- Church Road End; Railway Road End

Team information
Lancashire	(1985–1995 & 1998)
- As of 5 September 2010; Source: profile

Lytham Cricket & Sports Club is a cricket ground in Lytham, Lancashire. The first recorded match on the ground was in 1844, when Lytham played Kirkham.

In 1985, the ground held its first first-class match when Lancashire played Nottinghamshire in the County Championship. From 1985 to 1998, the ground played host to 10 first-class matches, the last of which came in the 1998 County Championship between Lancashire and Worcestershire.

The ground has also held a number of matches involving the Lancashire Second XI, holding a combined total of 9 Second XI fixtures for the Lancashire Second XI in the Minor Counties Championship and Second XI Championship.

In local domestic cricket, the ground is the home venue of Lytham Cricket Club who play in the Liverpool and District Cricket Competition.
