= Charmouth Open =

Tennis tournament in England

Defunct tennis tournament
- Founded: 1885; 140 years ago
- Abolished: 1890; 135 years ago
- Location: Charmouth, Dorset, England
- Venue: Charmouth Lawn Tennis Club
- Surface: Grass

The Charmouth Open was an annual grass court tennis tournament organised by the Charmouth Lawn Tennis Club, at Charmouth, Dorset, England, from 1885 to 1890. The tournament was played at until 1892.

== History ==
Charmouth Lawn Tennis Club is the oldest club in Dorset. It was founded in the 1880s as a croquet club with two lawns, and tennis could be played only after the needs of the croquet players had been met. In 1885 the club established the Charmouth Open Lawn Tennis Tournament. The tournament continued to be held annually through until 1890 when it was discontinued.

== See also ==
- Charmouth
