= Penarth LTC Championships =

Defunct tennis tournament
- Founded: 1885; 140 years ago
- Abolished: 1966; 59 years ago
- Location: Penarth, Glamorganshire, Wales.
- Venue: Penarth Lawn Tennis Club
- Surface: Grass

The Penarth LTC Championships was an all comers open grass court tennis tournament held in Penarth Lawn Tennis Club, Penarth, Glamorganshire, Wales. from 1885 to 1966.

== History ==
The Penarth LTC Championships were first established in August 1885. The tournament was played in conjunction with the Welsh Championships from 1886 until 1909. The Penarth LTC Championships was open tennis tournament for all comers from inception through till 1939.

Following the Second World War it became a closed competition for members of the club. The Penarth Club Championships or PLTC Club Championships (as they are known today) are still being held as off 2022.

During the open period previous winners of the men's singles include; Francis Escott Hancock (1885, 1888), William Gascoyne Dalziel (1886-1887), Kenneth Ramsden Marley who won the singles 12 times (1889–1900), Cecil Lonsford Sweet-Escott won 11 times (1902, 1904, 1926–1933). Former women's singles champions include Mary Sweet-Escott won 8 titles, (1890–1897).
