= North of Wales Open =

Defunct tennis tournament
- Founded: 1882; 143 years ago
- Abolished: 1900; 125 years ago
- Location: Pensarn, Abergele, Caernarfonshire, North Wales
- Venue: Pensarn Lawn Tennis Club
- Surface: Grass

The North of Wales Open was a grass court tennis tournament established in 1882 at Pensarn, Abergele, Caernarfonshire, North Wales that ran until 1900 when it was discontinued.

== History ==
In 1882 the Pensarn Lawn Tennis Club (f.1881) established the Pensarn LTC Club Open that featured a gentleman's singles event for the North of Wales Challenge Cup. In 1885 the tournament was renamed the North of Wales Open. The tournament continued to be held annually until 1900 when it was discontinued. Former players who won this tournament include Sydney Howard Smith (1895-1896), and Ruth Dyas who won the women's title in 1894.

== Venue & Promoter ==
Pensarn Lawn Tennis Club (f.1881) was established and financed by the English antiquary John Parsons Earwaker, who served as the club's first president and was instrumental in promoting the tournament. Earwaker died on 29 Jan. 1895 at Pensarn, and was buried in the old churchyard of Abergele.

== See also ==
- North Wales Championships (1881-1939)
- Pensarn
