= West Hoe =

Suburb of Plymouth, Devon

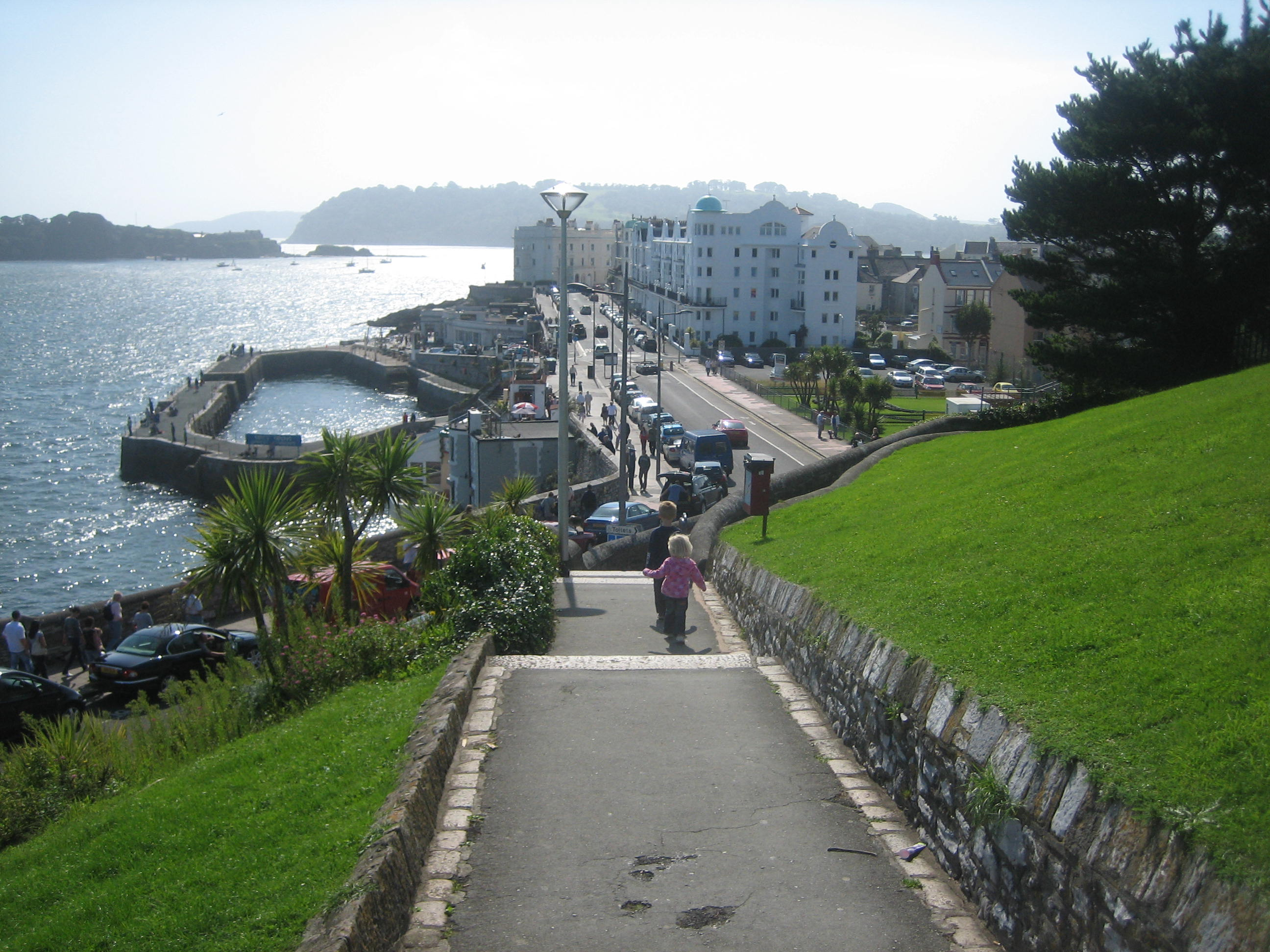

- Location within Devon
- Unitary authority: Plymouth
- Ceremonial county: Devon
- Region: South West
- Country: England
- Sovereign state: United Kingdom
- Post town: PLYMOUTH
- Postcode district: PL1 3XX
- Dialling code: 01752
- Police: Devon and Cornwall
- Fire: Devon and Somerset
- Ambulance: South Western

West Hoe is an area of Plymouth in the English county of Devon.

== History ==
West Hoe is a Victorian era housing development built into the site of a quarry from which much limestone was taken for the city centre development of Plymouth. In early 2025, a woman was attacked and later died in the area.

== Features ==
West Hoe abuts Millbay harbour to the west and the Hoe promenade to the east. Much of the housing stock is used as lodging houses and bed and breakfast hotels.

The area features elegant buildings including the Grand Parade and the remnants of the old public steam baths beside West Hoe Basin which were briefly a yacht club and now a bar and restaurant.

=== LOOK II ===
West Hoe Pier also features LOOK II, a permanent sculpture by British sculptor Antony Gormley.

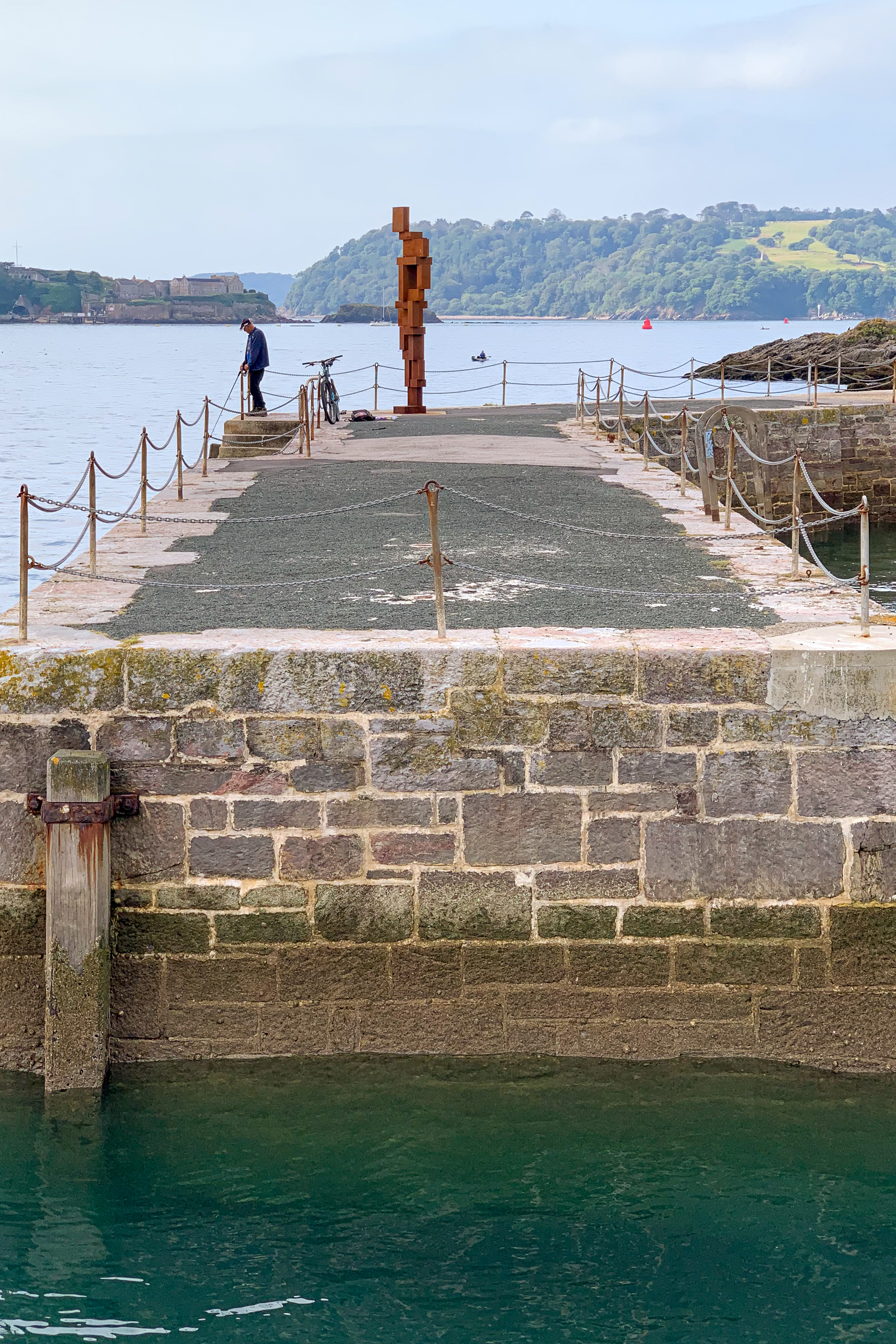
"LOOK II" (2020), a permanent cast iron sculpture by Antony Gormley on West Hoe Pier, Plymouth

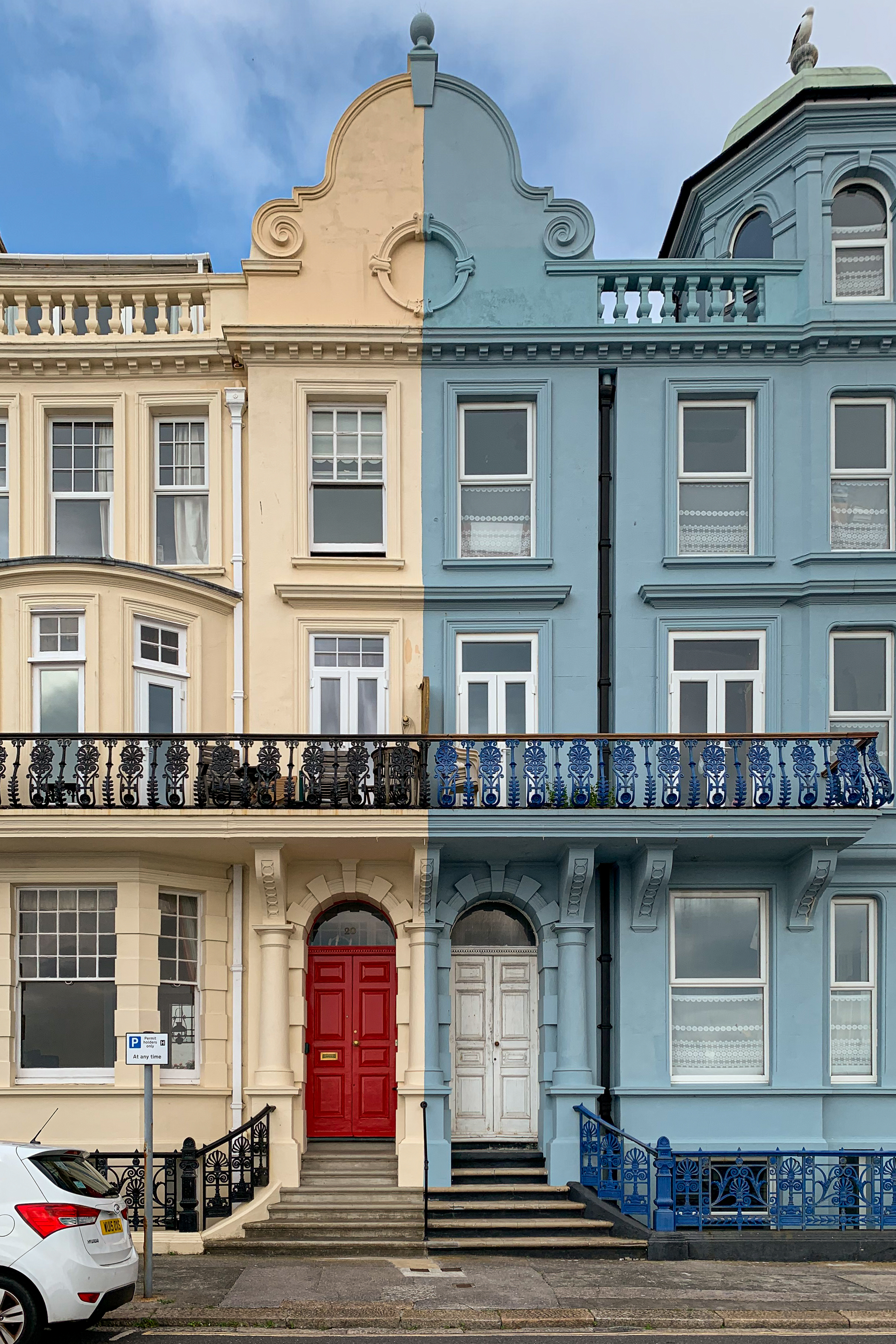
Street view of the cream and blue coloured houses of Grand Parade, Plymouth
