= West Wales Championships =

Defunct tennis tournament
- Founded: 1876; 150 years ago
- Abolished: 1939; 87 years ago
- Location: Tenby, Pembrokeshire, South Wales
- Venue: Tenby Lawn Lennis Club
- Surface: Grass

The West Wales Championships originally founded as the Tenby Lawn Tennis Club Tournament was a men's and women's grass court tennis tournament first held the Tenby Lawn Tennis Club, Tenby, Pembrokeshire, South Wales in 1876. In 1881 it was renamed as the South Wales Championships In 1900 it was renamed again to the West Wales Championships. The tournament was staged until the outbreak of World War Two in 1939.

== History ==
In 1876 the Tenby Lawn Club Tennis Tournament was first staged at the Tenby Lawn Tennis Club, Tenby, Pembrokeshire, South Wales. In 1881 the tournament changed its name to the South Wales Championships, and play was open to all residents who had resided for three months in all six southern counties of Wales. The first winner of the 1881 men's singles was Britain's L.G. Campbell. In 1885 the latter tournament was renamed as the South Wales and Monmouthshire Championships until 1900 when the Welsh Lawn Tennis Association moved the championships to Newport, Monmouthshire, South Wales. This tournament at Tenby, Pembrokeshire was then renamed as the West Wales Championships which ran until 1939. The men competed for the West Wales Challenge Cup.

== Venue ==
The original Tenby Cricket and Lawn Tennis Club was a former sports club situated on Heywood Lane, Tenby. It opened in the late-nineteenth century. The cricket club occupied land to the south side of Heywood Lane whilst the Tennis Club was located on the north side of Heywood Lane. The Tennis club no longer exists and the land has been subsequently used for housing - this is the present Heywood Court. The cricket pitch still survives though. In 2009 a new Tenby Tennis Club was reformed.

== Finals ==
=== Men's Singles ===
(incomplete roll) included:.

Year	Winner	Runner-up	Score
Tenby Lawn Tennis Tournament
1879		?	?
1880		?	?
South Wales Championships
1881	(United Kingdom) L.G. Campbell	(Wales) Grismond Saunders Davies	6-2, 6–5, 9-7
1882	(United Kingdom) P. J. Ashe	(United Kingdom) L.G. Campbell	6-4, 6-4, 6-2
1883.	(England) Herbert Wilberforce	(United Kingdom) P.J. Ashe	6-2, 6–1, 6-1
1884.	(England) Herbert Wilberforce (2)	(Wales) William Sidney Nelson Heard	6-4, 3–6, 6-2, 4-6, 6-1
South Wales and Monmouthshire Championships
1885	(Wales) William Sidney Nelson Heard	(Wales) E.W. Evans	5-6 6-0 6-0 6-3
1886	(Wales) William Sidney Nelson Heard (2)	(United Kingdom) James Baldwin	6-0, 6–1, 6-1
1887	(Wales) William Sidney Nelson Heard (3)	(Wales) E.W. Davies	6-2 6-4 6-1
1894.	(Wales) F.D. Morris	(Wales) E.W. Evans	?
West Wales Championships
1909.	(United Kingdom) W.S. Warburgh	(United Kingdom) G. Kent	6-3, 6–1, 6-3
1910	(United Kingdom) Algernon Kingscote	(United Kingdom) T.A.Gibson	6-3, 6–3, 6–1.
1915/1918	Not held (due to World War One)		
1919	(United Kingdom) Ivor Evans	(United Kingdom) G.R. Mellor	6-4, 6–4, 8-6
1920	(United Kingdom) Peter B.W. Freeman	(United Kingdom) H.R. Lymbery	6-0, 6–3, 6-0
1939	(United Kingdom) Ted Avory	(Scotland) B. Williams	6-1, 6-0
1940	Tournament abolished (due to World War Two)		

=== Women's Singles ===
(incomplete roll)

Year	Winner	Runner-up	Score
Tenby Lawn Tennis Tournament
1879		?	?
1880		?	?
South Wales Championships
1882	(Wales) G. Milman	(United Kingdom) Ruth Sparrow	6-5, 6–5, 6-1
1883.	(Wales) C. Jones	(England) E Fletcher	6-2, 3–6, 6-4
South Wales and Monmouthshire Championships
1886	(United Kingdom) Katherine Hill	(United Kingdom) Mary Agg	6-4, 6-3
West Wales Championships
1909.	(United Kingdom) Miss Douglas	(United Kingdom) Miss Wards	6-4, 6-4
1915/1918	Not held (due to World War One)		
1920	(United Kingdom) Gladys Lamplough	(United Kingdom) Kathleen Lidderdale	6-2, 6-2
1924	(Republic of Ireland) Mary McIlquham	(Wales) Weeta Crawshay-Williams	6-0, 6-4
1927	(United Kingdom) Mrs Burdon	(United Kingdom) Mrs Parke	6-2, 7-5
1928	(United Kingdom) Mrs Dudley	(United Kingdom) Mrs Congreve	6-2, 6-2
1930	(Wales) M Wynne	(England) Mrs D M Gimson	6-0, 6-2
1940	Tournament abolished (due to World War Two)		
