= 1886 men's tennis season =

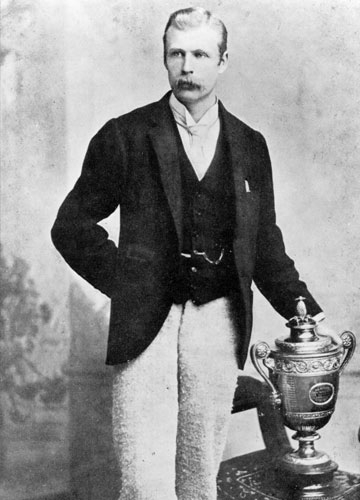
- Willoughby Hamilton is the joint title leader this year with American Robert Livingston Beeckman.

Details
- Duration: 7 March – 30 December
- Tournaments: 154
- Categories: Important (4); National (6); Provincial/Regional/State (25); County (14); Regular (86)

Achievements (singles)
- Most titles: (Ireland) Willoughby Hamilton (6) (United States) Robert Beeckman (6)
- Most finals: (United States) Robert Beeckman (8)

The 1886 men's tennis season was a worldwide tennis calendar composed of 154 major, national, professional, regional, provincial, state, county, city and regular tournaments. The season began in March in Auckland, New Zealand and ended in December in Napier, New Zealand.

== Season summary ==
In the four most important tournaments of the year Herbert Lawford wins a third successive Irish Lawn Tennis Championships title in Dublin beating Willoughby Hamilton in four sets. William Renshaw wins a sixth consecutive Wimbledon Championship defeating Irish Champion Herbert Lawford in four sets. At the Northern Championships in Liverpool, Harry Grove beats defending American champion James Dwight in three straight sets. In the United States Dick Sears wins a sixth consecutive US National Championship beating Robert Livingston Beeckman in four sets.

In the United States new regional sectional tournaments the New England Championships, Northwestern Championships and Southern Championships are all staged for the first time this year. In New Zealand the New Zealand Championships are held for the first time at Napier, New Zealand.

Irish player Willoughby Hamilton and American player Robert Livingston Beeckman were joint title leaders this season winning 5 titles each. Harry Grove reached the most finals with 7 in total winning 3 of them.

== Season results ==
Notes 1: Challenge Round: the final round of a tournament, in which the winner of a single-elimination phase faces the previous year's champion, who plays only that one match. The challenge round was used in the early history of tennis (from 1877 through 1921), in some tournaments not all.

* Indicates challenger

Notes 2:Tournaments in italics were events that were staged only once that season

=== Key ===
Important.
National
Provincial/State/Regional
County
Local/other

=== January ===
No events

=== February ===
No events

=== March ===
Date	Tournament	Winner	Finalist	Semi finalist	Quarter finalist
7–12.	Auckland Championships; Auckland, New Zealand; Hard; Singles – Doubles	(New Zealand) William Edward Barton; 6–1, 6–3, 6–2	(New Zealand) George Watson Holdship	(New Zealand) F.E. Mason (New Zealand) William Alexander Ridings	

=== April ===
Date	Tournament	Winner	Finalist	Semi finalist	Quarter finalist
17 April	British Covered Court Championships; London, Great Britain; Wood (i); Singles – Doubles	(United Kingdom) Edward Lake Williams; 6–2 1–6 5–7 6–4 6–4	(United Kingdom) Herbert Lawford	(United Kingdom) Frederick Bowlby (United Kingdom) Harry Grove	(United Kingdom) P.G. Mayre (United Kingdom) John Charles Kay (United Kingdom) Arthur John Stanley (United Kingdom) Alfred E. Walker
17 April	Seventh Regiment Championship; Seventh Regiment Armory; Manhattan, New York City, United States; Wood (i); Singles – Doubles	(United States) Valentine Gill Hall; 6–3, 3–6, 6–4, 6–2	(United States) Henry Graff Trevor		

=== May ===
Date	Tournament	Winner	Finalist	Semi finalist	Quarter finalist
30 Apr–1 May	Killiney and Ballybrack Championships; Killiney and Ballybrack; Killiney and Ballybrack, County Dublin, Ireland; Grass	(Ireland) Willoughby Hamilton; 12–10, 0–6, 6–3, 5–7, 14–12	(Ireland) Grainger Chaytor	(Ireland) Thomas Harrison Griffiths	(Ireland) Charles Henry Chaytor (Ireland) Harold Mahony (Ireland) Francis Woodcock Perry
10–15 May	Dublin University Championships; Dublin; Ireland; Hard	(Ireland) Eyre Chatterton; 6–3 6–4 6–0	(Ireland) Grainger Chaytor	(Ireland) Manliffe Goodbody (Ireland) Phillip Sandford	(Ireland) Tom Campion (Ireland) Charles Chaytor (Ireland) Harold Mahony
10–17 May	Fitzwilliam Club Championships; Dublin; Ireland; Hard	(Ireland) Willoughby Hamilton; 6–3 6–4 6–0	(Ireland) Eyre Chatterton	(Ireland) Ernest Browne (Ireland) Toler Garvey	
8–18 May	New South Wales Championships; Sydney, Australia; Singles – Doubles	(Australia) Charles William Cropper; 6–0, 6–0, 5–7, 8–6	(United Kingdom) William Bush-Salmon (Australia) R. D. Fitzgerald	(Australia) Louis Whyte (Australia) Charles T. Metcalfe	(Australia) Walter John Carre Riddell (Australia) H. E. Merewether (Australia) J. R. King (Australia) H. W. Bartram
12–20 May	Ceylon Championships; The Hill Club; Nuwara Eliya; Ceylon; Clay	(Dominion of Ceylon) Charles Edward De Fonblanque; 6–3 6–4 6–0	(Dominion of Ceylon) Edward George Farquharson		
20–22 May.	West of Scotland Championships; Pollockshields Athletic Club; Glasgow, Lanarkshire, Scotland; Grass; Singles – Doubles	(Scotland) T. Leigh MacLachlan; 6–1, 6–3, 6–3	(United Kingdom of Great Britain and Ireland) J.B. Gray	(Scotland) J.T.C. MacKinlay (Scotland) Edward Mortimer Shand	(United Kingdom of Great Britain and Ireland) C.A. Gairdner (United Kingdom of Great Britain and Ireland) C. Gray (Scotland) A. McWilliam (Scotland) J. Robertson
20–22 May.	West of Scotland Championships; Pollockshields Athletic Club; Glasgow, Lanarkshire, Scotland; Grass; Singles – Doubles	(United Kingdom of Great Britain and Ireland) Walter William Chamberlain (Scotland) Jane Meikle; 6–1, 6–2	(Scotland) John Galbraith Horn (Scotland) Julia MacKenzie	(Scotland) J.T.C. MacKinlay (Scotland) Edward Mortimer Shand	(United Kingdom of Great Britain and Ireland) C.A. Gairdner (United Kingdom of Great Britain and Ireland) C. Gray (Scotland) A. McWilliam (Scotland) J. Robertson
20–22 May.	Western Counties Championship; Pollockshields Athletic Club; Pollockshields, Glasgow, Lanarkshire, Scotland; Grass; Singles – Doubles	(Scotland) Archibald Thompson; 6–2 4–6 8–6 6–8 6–2	(Scotland) John Galbraith Horn	(England) Henry Guy Nadin (Scotland) George Nelson Stenhouse	(Scotland) Lachlan McLachlan (Scotland) J.T.C. MacKinlay (England) Arthur Nevile John Story (England) T. Service
20–22 May.	Western Counties Championship; Pollockshields Athletic Club; Pollockshields, Glasgow, Lanarkshire, Scotland; Grass; Singles – Doubles	(United Kingdom of Great Britain and Ireland) Walter William Chamberlain (England) Arthur Nevile John Story; 6–2, 6–1, 6–4	(United Kingdom of Great Britain and Ireland) J. Rodger (Scotland) P. Smith	(England) Henry Guy Nadin (Scotland) George Nelson Stenhouse	(Scotland) Lachlan McLachlan (Scotland) J.T.C. MacKinlay (England) Arthur Nevile John Story (England) T. Service
17–23 May	Fitzwilliam Purse; Dublin; Ireland; Grass	(Ireland) Grainger Chaytor; 3–6 6–2 6–4 6–2	(Ireland) Francis Woodcock Perry		
24–29 May	Irish Lawn Tennis Championships; Dublin, Ireland; Grass	(United Kingdom of Great Britain and Ireland) Herbert Lawford; 5–7 6–4 6–4 7–5	(Ireland) Eyre Chatterton	(United States) James Dwight (Ireland) Toler Garvey	(United Kingdom of Great Britain and Ireland) Tom Campion (United Kingdom of Great Britain and Ireland) Thomas Harrison Griffiths (Ireland) H.J. Maguire (Ireland) Ronald M. McDougall
24–29 May	Irish Lawn Tennis Championships; Dublin, Ireland; Grass	Challenger (Ireland) Willoughby Hamilton		(United States) James Dwight (Ireland) Toler Garvey	(United Kingdom of Great Britain and Ireland) Tom Campion (United Kingdom of Great Britain and Ireland) Thomas Harrison Griffiths (Ireland) H.J. Maguire (Ireland) Ronald M. McDougall

=== June ===
Date	Tournament	Winner	Finalist	Semi finalist	Quarter finalist
1–4 Jun.	Whitehouse Open; Whitehouse Lawn Tennis Club; Edinburgh, Lothian, Scotland. Clay; Singles – Doubles	(Scotland) Herbert Bowes-Lyon; 6–1 8–6 6–1	(Scotland) George Nelson Stenhouse	(United Kingdom) Walter William Chamberlain (Scotland) T. Leigh MacLachlan	(Scotland) George Kerr (Scotland) Richard Millar Watson
1–4 Jun.	Whitehouse Open; Whitehouse Lawn Tennis Club; Edinburgh, Lothian, Scotland. Clay; Singles – Doubles	(Scotland) J. Ferguson (England) Miss A. Steel; 6–3, 4–6, 3–2 ret.	(Scotland) E. Ferguson (Scotland) Miss W. Ferguson	(United Kingdom) Walter William Chamberlain (Scotland) T. Leigh MacLachlan	(Scotland) George Kerr (Scotland) Richard Millar Watson
4–5 Jun.	Young America Cricket Club Invitation; Young America Cricket Club; Stanton, Philadelphia, Pennsylvania, United States; Grass; Singles – Doubles	(United States) Robert Livingston Beeckman; 6–4,6–4, 9–7	(United States) Joseph Sill Clark Sr.	(United States) Clarence Munroe Clark (United States) Howard Augustus Taylor	
1–6 Jun	Kent Championships; Beckenham, Great Britain; Grass; Singles – Doubles	(United Kingdom of Great Britain and Ireland) Herbert Chipp; 6–4 3–6 6–3 2–6 6–3	(United Kingdom of Great Britain and Ireland) Edward James Avory	(United Kingdom of Great Britain and Ireland) Frederick Bowlby (United Kingdom of Great Britain and Ireland) James Herbert Crispe	(United Kingdom of Great Britain and Ireland) Harold Greenwell (United Kingdom of Great Britain and Ireland) Ernest George Meers (United Kingdom of Great Britain and Ireland) G.H. Taylor (United Kingdom of Great Britain and Ireland) William C. Taylor
31 May–6 Jun	West of England Championships; Bath, Great Britain; Grass; Singles – Doubles	(United States) James Dwight; 6–4 6–3 6–4	(United Kingdom) Harry Grove	(United Kingdom) Mark Hartnell (United Kingdom) Booth Lynes	(United Kingdom) Joshua Burton (Ireland) Ernest Browne (United Kingdom) John Charles Kay (United Kingdom) Stewart Murray
7 Jun	Oxford University Champion Tournament; Oxford, Great Britain; Grass; Singles – Doubles	(United Kingdom) Howard Pease; 2–6 6–3 6–2 4–6 8–6	(United Kingdom) Thomas Musgrave Burton	(United Kingdom) H.T. Burrell (United Kingdom) J.B. Forman	(Scotland) Bargeny McCulloch (United Kingdom) Francis Edward Cuming (England) Richard Heron Gee (England) Henry Edwin Hunter Kent
6–11 Jun.	County Wexford Lawn Tennis Club Tournament; Wexford, Ireland; Grass; Singles – Doubles	(United Kingdom of Great Britain and Ireland) G. Foley; 6–1, 6–2	(United Kingdom of Great Britain and Ireland) Edmond Thomas Molyneux Sandwith		
9–12 Jun	Middle States Championships; Hoboken, New Jersey, United States; Singles – Doubles	(United States) Robert L. Beeckman; 1–6 8–6 6–2 6–8 6–1	(United Kingdom) William E. Glyn	(United States) F. Keyser (United States) Henry Slocum	(United States) H.W. Bucknall (United States) Morton Paton (United States) Morgan Post (United States) W. Trimble
7–13 Jun	East Gloucestershire Championships; Cheltenham, Great Britain; Grass; Singles – Doubles	(Ireland) Ernest Browne; 6–3 6–4 6–4	(United States) James Dwight	(United Kingdom) Mark Hartnell (United Kingdom) Edward G. Meyricke	(United Kingdom) James Baldwin (United Kingdom) A.W. Gordon (United Kingdom) Harry Grove (United Kingdom) Arthur Godfrey Pease
17 Jun	Somerville Championship; Somerville Tennis Club; Somerville; United States; Grass; Singles – Doubles	(United States) Edward Falcombe Woods; 6–2, 6–2	(United States) Robert Lincoln	(United States) C.E. Fitz	(United States) Elmer Rand Hollander (United States) Fred. E. Wood
14–19 Jun	Scottish Championships; Edinburgh, Great Britain; Singles – Doubles	(Scotland) Patrick Bowes-Lyon; 6–1 4–6 6–1 6–1	(Scotland) Archibald Thomson	(United Kingdom) James H. Aitken (Scotland) George Nelson Stenhouse	(United Kingdom) Walter William Chamberlain (United Kingdom) Charles R. A. Howden (Scotland) George Kerr (United Kingdom) Arthur Nevile John Story
14–19 Jun	Scottish Championships; Edinburgh, Great Britain; Singles – Doubles	Challenger (Scotland) Herbert Bowes-Lyon		(United Kingdom) James H. Aitken (Scotland) George Nelson Stenhouse	(United Kingdom) Walter William Chamberlain (United Kingdom) Charles R. A. Howden (Scotland) George Kerr (United Kingdom) Arthur Nevile John Story
15–19 Jun	Fall Open Tournament Far and Near LTC; Hastings-on-Hudson, New York; United States; Grass; Singles – Doubles	(United States) Robert L. Beeckman; 6–0 retired	(United States) H.W. Bucknall	(United States) Morton Spring Paton (United States) Henry Slocum	(United States) M. Gardner (United States) Grant Notman (United States) R.R. Perkins (United States) M. Post
15–19 Jun	London Championships; London, Great Britain; Singles – Doubles	(United Kingdom) Ernest Lewis; 7–5 6–1 6–3	(United Kingdom) Harry Grove	(United Kingdom) Herbert Chipp (United Kingdom) Ernest George Meers	(United Kingdom) James Herbert Crispe (United Kingdom) A.R. Lewis (United Kingdom) Arthur John Stanley (United Kingdom) William C. Taylor
15–19 Jun	London Championships; London, Great Britain; Singles – Doubles	Challenger (United Kingdom) Charles Hoadley Ashe Ross		(United Kingdom) Herbert Chipp (United Kingdom) Ernest George Meers	(United Kingdom) James Herbert Crispe (United Kingdom) A.R. Lewis (United Kingdom) Arthur John Stanley (United Kingdom) William C. Taylor
16–19 Jun	Orange Spring Tournament; Montrose, South Orange, New Jersey, United States; Grass; Singles – Doubles	(United States) Robert Livingston Beeckman; 6–4 3–6 6–3 2–6 6–3	(United Kingdom) William Edward Glyn	(United States) Edward Peale MacMullen (United States) Henry Slocum	(United States) H.V. Berry (United States) Grant Notman (United States) Morton Spring Paton (United States) Carroll J. Post Jr.
16–19 Jun	Waterloo Tournament; Liverpool, Great Britain; Outdoor; Grass; Singles – Doubles	(United Kingdom) Jacob Gaitskell Brown; 6–3 6–2 2–6 3–6 6–1	(United Kingdom) William Parkfield Wethered	(United Kingdom) J.E. Edmondson (United Kingdom) Beresford St George Verschoyle	(United Kingdom) J.M. Draper (United Kingdom) G.R. Edgecombe (United Kingdom) C.E. Edmondson (United Kingdom) E. Harley
16–19 Jun	Waterloo Tournament; Liverpool, Great Britain; Outdoor; Grass; Singles – Doubles	Challenger (United Kingdom) Charles Stananought		(United Kingdom) J.E. Edmondson (United Kingdom) Beresford St George Verschoyle	(United Kingdom) J.M. Draper (United Kingdom) G.R. Edgecombe (United Kingdom) C.E. Edmondson (United Kingdom) E. Harley
19 Jun	Cambridgeshire Lawn Tennis Tournament; Cambridge, Great Britain; Singles – Doubles	(United Kingdom) George E. D. Brown (United Kingdom) William Nevill Cobbold divided title	(United Kingdom) Frederick Whitehead; 3rd place		
14–20 Jun	Welsh Championships; Penarth, Great Britain; Singles – Doubles	(Ireland) Ernest Browne; 6–0 retired	(United Kingdom) James Baldwin	(United Kingdom) W.M. Brownlee (United Kingdom) Charles Lacy Sweet	(Wales) William Gascoyne Dalziel (United Kingdom) E.W. David (United Kingdom) John Redfern Deykin (Wales) D.D. Rees
21–26 Jun	Clifton Open; Clifton, Bristol, Great Britain; Outdoor; Grass; Singles – Doubles	(United Kingdom) Charles Lacy Sweet w.o.	(United Kingdom) Mark Anthony Hartnell	(United Kingdom) William Methven Brownlee (United Kingdom) John Charles Kay	(United Kingdom) James Baldwin (United Kingdom) Arnold Wyersdale Blake (United Kingdom) Herbert Washbourne Gibbs (United Kingdom) Booth Hodgetts Lynes
21–26 Jun	Northern Championships; Liverpool, Great Britain; Grass; Singles – Doubles	(United Kingdom of Great Britain and Ireland) Harry Grove; 6–4 6–3 6–1	(United Kingdom of Great Britain and Ireland) William Parkfield Wethered	(United Kingdom of Great Britain and Ireland) W. R. Craig (United Kingdom of Great Britain and Ireland) Ernest Renshaw	(United Kingdom of Great Britain and Ireland) Jacob Gaitskell Brown (United Kingdom of Great Britain and Ireland) A.P. Jones (United Kingdom of Great Britain and Ireland) Charles Frederick Latham (United Kingdom of Great Britain and Ireland) Andrew Laurie Macfie
21–26 Jun	Northern Championships; Liverpool, Great Britain; Grass; Singles – Doubles	Challenger (United States) James Dwight		(United Kingdom of Great Britain and Ireland) W. R. Craig (United Kingdom of Great Britain and Ireland) Ernest Renshaw	(United Kingdom of Great Britain and Ireland) Jacob Gaitskell Brown (United Kingdom of Great Britain and Ireland) A.P. Jones (United Kingdom of Great Britain and Ireland) Charles Frederick Latham (United Kingdom of Great Britain and Ireland) Andrew Laurie Macfie
23–26 Jun	Warriston Park LTC Tournament; Edinburgh, Great Britain; Grass	(Scotland) Herbert Bowes-Lyon; 6–3 6–0 ret.	(United Kingdom) J.P. Smythe	(Scotland) George Kerr (Scotland) Charles Murray	(United Kingdom of Great Britain and Ireland) Lewin Venn Alexander (Scotland) Alfred Aitken Thomson (United Kingdom of Great Britain and Ireland) Pat. Smith (Scotland) George Nelson Stenhouse
24–26 Jun	Redhill Tournament; Redhill, Surrey, Great Britain; Outdoor; Grass; Singles – Doubles	(United Kingdom) Harold S. Stone (United Kingdom) Charles Hoadley Ashe Ross shared title	(United Kingdom) Harry Sibthorpe Barlow (United Kingdom) Percy Bateman Brown	(United Kingdom) E. Brown (United Kingdom) William John Down (United Kingdom) E.A. Ranger (United Kingdom) William Taylor	
28–30 Jun	New Jersey State Championships; South Orange, New Jersey United States; Singles – Doubles	(United States) Richard Field Conover; 6–4 3–6 6–3 2–6 6–3	(United States) R.J. Halsey	(United States) Peter R. Lyman (United States) Edgar Williams	(United States) E.R. Bellman (United States) (United States) Samuel A. Campbell Jr. (United States) S.C. Hodge (United States) C.F. Watson

=== July ===
Date	Tournament	Winner	Finalist	Semi finalist	Quarter finalist				
Jul.	Natal Championships; Pietermaritzburg, South Africa; Grass; Singles; Doubles	(South Africa) Mr. Booth; 6–1, 6–1, 6–1	(South Africa) A.E. Townsend						
28 Jun–2 Jul	Edgbaston Open Tournament; Edgbaston Cricket and Lawn Tennis Club; Edgbaston, Warwickshire, England; Grass; Singles – Doubles	(United Kingdom) John Redfern Deykin; 6–1, 6–3, 8–6	(United Kingdom) C.H. Rossbent	(United Kingdom) G.E. Lowe (United Kingdom) John George Thursfield	(England) Percy Bateman Brown (United Kingdom) H.P. Darling (United States) James Dwight (United Kingdom) E.P. Wright				
28 Jun–2 Jul	Edgbaston Open Tournament; Edgbaston Cricket and Lawn Tennis Club; Edgbaston, Warwickshire, England; Grass; Singles – Doubles	(United Kingdom) John Redfern Deykin (United Kingdom) Mr. Rose; 6–0, 6–2	(England) George Ernest Dixon Brown (England) Percy Bateman Brown	(United Kingdom) G.E. Lowe (United Kingdom) John George Thursfield	(England) Percy Bateman Brown (United Kingdom) H.P. Darling (United States) James Dwight (United Kingdom) E.P. Wright				
28 Jun–2 Jul	Edgbaston Open Tournament; Edgbaston Cricket and Lawn Tennis Club; Edgbaston, Warwickshire, England; Grass; Singles – Doubles	(United Kingdom) John Redfern Deykin (England) Maud Watson; 7–5, 6–1, 4–6, 2–6, 8–6	(England) William Renshaw (United Kingdom) Margaret Bracewell	(United Kingdom) G.E. Lowe (United Kingdom) John George Thursfield	(England) Percy Bateman Brown (United Kingdom) H.P. Darling (United States) James Dwight (United Kingdom) E.P. Wright				
28 Jun–2 Jul	Midland Counties Championships; Edgbaston Cricket and Lawn Tennis Club; Edgbaston, Warwickshire, England; Grass; Singles – Doubles	(United Kingdom) Frank Noon; 6–4, 6–2, 6–4	(United Kingdom) J.H. Mitchell	(United Kingdom) ] Herbert Haden Monckton (United Kingdom) William Brunston Thursfield	(United Kingdom) Henry Simmons Burbridge (United Kingdom) ] John Redfern Deykin (United Kingdom) A.H. Griffiths (United Kingdom) W. Hasluck				
28 Jun–2 Jul	Midland Counties Championships; Edgbaston Cricket and Lawn Tennis Club; Edgbaston, Warwickshire, England; Grass; Singles – Doubles	Challenger (United Kingdom) Conway John Morgan		(United Kingdom) ] Herbert Haden Monckton (United Kingdom) William Brunston Thursfield	(United Kingdom) Henry Simmons Burbridge (United Kingdom) ] John Redfern Deykin (United Kingdom) A.H. Griffiths (United Kingdom) W. Hasluck				
1–3 July	Northumberland Cricket Club Open; Newcastle upon Tyne, Great Britain; Grass; Singles – Doubles	(United Kingdom of Great Britain and Ireland) Kenneth Ramsden Marley; 7–5 2–6 6–4 4–6 6–4	(United Kingdom of Great Britain and Ireland) William Edwin Pease	(United Kingdom of Great Britain and Ireland) Mark Fenwick (United Kingdom of Great Britain and Ireland) Charles Liddell	(United Kingdom of Great Britain and Ireland) Arthur Wellesley Hallward (United Kingdom of Great Britain and Ireland) H.A. Murton (United Kingdom of Great Britain and Ireland) Harold Gurney Pease (United Kingdom of Great Britain and Ireland) W.R. Wilson				
1–3 July.	Staffordshire Lawn Tennis Tournament; Stafford Institute LTC; Stafford, Great Britain; Grass; Singles	(United Kingdom) Francis Seymour (Frank) Noon; 6–5 6–3	(United Kingdom) Conway John Morgan	(United Kingdom) W.H. Edward (United Kingdom) Frederick Anthony Watts	(United Kingdom) Henry Simmons Burbridge (United Kingdom) John Redfern Deykin (United Kingdom) A.H. Griffiths (United Kingdom) G.E. Lowe				
3–5 Jul.	Ilkley Open Tournament; Ilkley LTC; Ilkley, Yorkshire, England; Grass	(Ireland) William Henry Mahon; 6–3 4–6 3–6 6–3 6–5	(United Kingdom of Great Britain and Ireland) E.W. Fletcher	(United Kingdom of Great Britain and Ireland) F. Brown (United Kingdom of Great Britain and Ireland) M. Pole	(United Kingdom of Great Britain and Ireland) George Graham Stewart Grundy (United Kingdom of Great Britain and Ireland) Alan J. Hartley (United Kingdom of Great Britain and Ireland) B. Hartley (United Kingdom of Great Britain and Ireland) Alexander Mallinson				
6 Jul.	Championship of Minnesota (later Minnesota Open); Minnesota LTC; Minneapolis, Minnesota, United States; Singles – Doubles	(United States) Lucius Pond Ordway ?	(United States) ?						
3 – 7 Jul.	Scarlet Ribbon Amateur Tournament; Scarlet Ribbon LTC; Groveland Avenue, Chicago, Illinois, United States. Grass	(United States) Charles A. Chase; 2–6, 6–3, 6–3, 6–4	(United States) Henry Slocum						
8 Jul.	Edinburgh University LTC Open; Edinburgh University LTC; Corstorphine, Edinburgh, Scotland; Grass; Singles – Doubles	(Scotland) Herbert Bowes-Lyon; 6–1, 6–2, 6–1	(United Kingdom) James H. Aitken	(Scotland) A.M. Inglis (England) Arthur Nevile John Story	(United Kingdom) J.H. Conyers (United Kingdom) R.F.C. Little (England) Stanley Riseley (United Kingdom) D.J. Walls				
6–9 Jul.	New England Championships; New Haven LTC; New Haven, Connecticut United States; Singles – Doubles	(United States) Henry Slocum; 1–6, 6–2, 6–4, 6–1	(United States) Francis Gibbons (Frank) Beach	(United States) A.L. Ripley (United States) Philip Shelton Sears	(United States) Godfrey Malbone Brinley (United States) Lewis Henry Paddock (United States) William Larned Thacher				
7–10 Jul.	Thirsk Lawn Tennis Tournament; Thirsk LTC; Thirsk, North Yorkshire, England; Grass	(United Kingdom of Great Britain and Ireland) Seward Wilfrid Meek; 6–2 6–4	(United Kingdom of Great Britain and Ireland) C.H.C. Harrison	(United Kingdom of Great Britain and Ireland) W.T. Baines (United Kingdom of Great Britain and Ireland) J.W. Willans	(United Kingdom of Great Britain and Ireland) T.L. Johnston (United Kingdom of Great Britain and Ireland) Thomas Oswald Swarbreck (United Kingdom of Great Britain and Ireland) A. Snowden (United Kingdom of Great Britain and Ireland) E.M. Turner				
7–10 Jul	Broughty Ferry Open; Broughty Ferry LTC; Broughty Ferry, Dundee, Angus, Scotland; Clay; Singles – Doubles	(Scotland) Archibald Thompson; 6–2 4–6 8–6 6–8 6–2	(United Kingdom) J.B. Gray	(United Kingdom) J.B. Gray (United Kingdom) W.H. Blyth Martin (United Kingdom) J. St. John	(Scotland) Herbert Bowes-Lyon (United Kingdom) J. Rodger (England) Arthur Nevile John Story (United Kingdom) C.E. Todd				
7–10 Jul	Broughty Ferry Open; Broughty Ferry LTC; Broughty Ferry, Dundee, Angus, Scotland; Clay; Singles – Doubles	(Scotland) Archibald Thompson (United Kingdom) J.B. Gray; 8–6, 6–1, 4–6, 7–5	(Scotland) A.M. Inglis (England) Arthur Nevile John Story	(United Kingdom) J.B. Gray (United Kingdom) W.H. Blyth Martin (United Kingdom) J. St. John	(Scotland) Herbert Bowes-Lyon (United Kingdom) J. Rodger (England) Arthur Nevile John Story (United Kingdom) C.E. Todd				
7–10 Jul	Broughty Ferry Open; Broughty Ferry LTC; Broughty Ferry, Dundee, Angus, Scotland; Clay; Singles – Doubles	(England) Arthur Nevile John Story (Scotland) Miss Malcom; 6–3, 6–2	(Scotland) Archibald Thompson (United Kingdom) Miss. Hay	(United Kingdom) J.B. Gray (United Kingdom) W.H. Blyth Martin (United Kingdom) J. St. John	(Scotland) Herbert Bowes-Lyon (United Kingdom) J. Rodger (England) Arthur Nevile John Story (United Kingdom) C.E. Todd				
8–10 Jul	Chapel Allerton LTC Tournament; Chapel Allerton Lawn Tennis Club; Chapel Allerton, Leeds, Yorkshire, England. Grass; Singles – Doubles	(United Kingdom) John Thorneycroft Hartley; 2–6, 6–2, 4–6, 6–3, 6–0	(Ireland) William Henry Mahon						
8–10 Jul.	Claremount Park Open; Claremont Park Public Lawn Tennis Ground; Blackpool, Lancashire, England. Grass; Singles – Doubles	(United Kingdom) Walter Reid Craig; 6–4, 6–3	(United Kingdom) C. Howard	(United Kingdom) W.J. Read (United Kingdom) Owen Seaman	(United Kingdom) J.W. Burgess (United Kingdom) B.H. Cockson (United Kingdom) A.W. Denton (United Kingdom) H. Howard				
8–10 Jul.	Claremount Park Open; Claremont Park Public Lawn Tennis Ground; Blackpool, Lancashire, England. Grass; Singles – Doubles	(United Kingdom) C. Howard (United Kingdom) H. Howard; 6–2, 6–3	(United Kingdom) Owen Seaman (United Kingdom) Mr. Worship	(United Kingdom) W.J. Read (United Kingdom) Owen Seaman	(United Kingdom) J.W. Burgess (United Kingdom) B.H. Cockson (United Kingdom) A.W. Denton (United Kingdom) H. Howard				
8–10 Jul.	Claremount Park Open; Claremont Park Public Lawn Tennis Ground; Blackpool, Lancashire, England. Grass; Singles – Doubles	(United Kingdom) Walter Reid Craig (United Kingdom) Miss Viener; 6–3, 4–6, 6–2	(United Kingdom) Mr. Howarth (United Kingdom) Miss.Moore	(United Kingdom) W.J. Read (United Kingdom) Owen Seaman	(United Kingdom) J.W. Burgess (United Kingdom) B.H. Cockson (United Kingdom) A.W. Denton (United Kingdom) H. Howard				
13 Jul	Wimbledon Championships; London, Great Britain; Singles – Doubles	(United Kingdom) William Renshaw; 6–0 5–7 6–3 6–4	(United Kingdom) Herbert Lawford						
13 Jul	Wimbledon Championships; London, Great Britain; Singles – Doubles	(United Kingdom) William Renshaw (United Kingdom) Ernest Renshaw; 6–3 6–3 4–6 7–5	(United Kingdom) Claude Farrer (United Kingdom) Arthur Stanley						
7–14 Jul	Langley Marish Tournament; Langley Marish, Berkshire, England; Grass	(United Kingdom) Felix Henry Prince Palmer; 6–2, 3–6, 6–4	(United Kingdom) Montague Alfred Orgill	(United Kingdom) Alexander Kaye Butterworth (United Kingdom) A.J. de Winton	(United Kingdom) Gervase O'Brien Alington (England) H.F. Goodford (United Kingdom) Wiliam Harry Nash (United Kingdom) Welby Francis Montresor				
13–15 Jul	Burton-on-Trent Open; Burton-on-Trent, Staffordshire, England; Outdoor; Grass; Singles – Doubles	(Ireland) William Henry Mahon; 6–2, 6–0, 7–5	(United Kingdom) Lewin Venn Alexander	(England) Edward Evershed (England) Geoffrey Meynell Heathcote-Hacker	(United Kingdom) F.A. Clark (United Kingdom) W.G. Lowe (United Kingdom) H.E. Sugden				
13–15 Jul	Burton-on-Trent Open; Burton-on-Trent, Staffordshire, England; Outdoor; Grass; Singles – Doubles	(United Kingdom) Henry Guy Nadin (United Kingdom) W.G. Lowe; 4–6, 6–3, 7–5, 8–6	(United Kingdom) Lewin Venn Alexander (Ireland) William Henry Mahon	(England) Edward Evershed (England) Geoffrey Meynell Heathcote-Hacker	(United Kingdom) F.A. Clark (United Kingdom) W.G. Lowe (United Kingdom) H.E. Sugden				
13–15 Jul	Burton-on-Trent Open; Burton-on-Trent, Staffordshire, England; Outdoor; Grass; Singles – Doubles	(United Kingdom) F.A. Clark (England) Miss Denton; 6–4, 4–6, 8–6	(United Kingdom) Frank Noon (England) Mrs Hodson	(England) Edward Evershed (England) Geoffrey Meynell Heathcote-Hacker	(United Kingdom) F.A. Clark (United Kingdom) W.G. Lowe (United Kingdom) H.E. Sugden				
14–17 Jul	North Berkshire ALTC Tournament; Abingdon, North Berkshire, England; Outdoor; Grass; Singles – Doubles	(United Kingdom) W.R. Carles; 6–1, 5–6, 6–1	(United Kingdom) A.H. Jacob	(United Kingdom) Arthur Percy Jones (United Kingdom) Mr. Pridham	(United Kingdom) T.E. Graham (United Kingdom) H.B. Hawkes (United Kingdom) Mr. Hickley; Mr. Michel				
16–17 Jul.	Galashiels Tournament; Galashiels LTC/Gala Club; Langshaw, Galashiels, Selkirkshire, Scotland; Grass; Singles – Doubles	(England) Arthur Nevile John Story; 7–9, 6–4, 6–2, 7–9, 6–0	(Scotland) George Kerr	(Scotland) J.E. Sanderson (United Kingdom) J. St. John	(United Kingdom) Buckham Brown (Scotland) Alfred Aitken Thomson (Scotland) Forrester John Thomson (Scotland) Richard Millar Watson				
16–17 Jul.	Galashiels Tournament; Galashiels LTC/Gala Club; Langshaw, Galashiels, Selkirkshire, Scotland; Grass; Singles – Doubles	20–24 Jul.	Somersetshire Championships; West Somerset LTC; Taunton, Somerset, England; Grass; Singles – Doubles	(Scotland) J.E. Sanderson (United Kingdom) J. St. John	(United Kingdom) Buckham Brown (Scotland) Alfred Aitken Thomson (Scotland) Forrester John Thomson (Scotland) Richard Millar Watson	(United Kingdom) Ernest Legassicke Hancock; 2–6 8–6 6–4	(United Kingdom) James Baldwin	(United Kingdom) Arnold Wyersdale Blake (United Kingdom) A.E. Sloman	(United Kingdom) F. Badcock (United Kingdom) W.A. Newman (United Kingdom) C.R. Rodwell (United Kingdom) R.P. Spurway
20–23 Jul.	Buffalo Lawn Tennis Tournament; Summer Street Grounds; Buffalo, New York State, United States; Grass; Singles – Doubles	(United States) Ganson Depew; 6–3, 6–2, 6–1	(United States) Edward Everett Tanner	(United States) Mr. Barr (United States) R. Keep	(United States) Mr. Brent (Canada) Henry Gordon Mackenzie (Canada) Oliver Richard MacKlem (United States) Mr. Wilcox				
20–23 Jul.	Rothesay Lawn Tennis Tournament; Craigmore Lawn Tennis Club; Craigmore, Rothesay, Isle of Bute, Scotland. Clay; Singles – Doubles	(Scotland) Anderson Steel; 7–5, 6–2, 9–7	(United Kingdom) Charles Higginbottom	(Scotland) D.G.L. MacLure (Scotland) Edward Mortimer Shand					
19–24 Jul	Middlesex Championships; Chiswick Park, Middlesex, England; Grass; Singles – Doubles	(United Kingdom) Harry Grove; 6–3, 6–2, 6–3	(United Kingdom) Teddy Williams	(Ireland) Tom Campion (United Kingdom) Herbert Wilberforce	(United Kingdom) Herbert Chipp (Scotland) Herbert Bowes-Lyon (United Kingdom) William C. Taylor (United Kingdom) Robert Charles Thompson				
19–24 Jul	Middlesex Championships; Chiswick Park, Middlesex, England; Grass; Singles – Doubles	(United Kingdom) Herbert Chipp (United Kingdom) Ernest Wool Lewis; 7–5, 4–6, 6–1, 3–6	(United Kingdom) Harry Grove (United Kingdom) Teddy Wiliams	(Ireland) Tom Campion (United Kingdom) Herbert Wilberforce	(United Kingdom) Herbert Chipp (Scotland) Herbert Bowes-Lyon (United Kingdom) William C. Taylor (United Kingdom) Robert Charles Thompson				
19–24 Jul	Middlesex Championships; Chiswick Park, Middlesex, England; Grass; Singles – Doubles	(England) William Renshaw (United Kingdom) Blanche Bingley; 6–3, 4–6, 6–4	(United Kingdom) William C. Taylor (England) May Jacks	(Ireland) Tom Campion (United Kingdom) Herbert Wilberforce	(United Kingdom) Herbert Chipp (Scotland) Herbert Bowes-Lyon (United Kingdom) William C. Taylor (United Kingdom) Robert Charles Thompson				
21 – 24 July.	South of Ireland Championships; Limerick, Ireland; Grass; Singles – Doubles	(Ireland) Willoughby Hamilton; 6–3 6–1 6–2	(Ireland) Edward M. L. Lysaght	(Ireland) William Drumond Hamilton	(Ireland) Nicholas Trafalgar Biddulph (Ireland) R.C. Hamilton				
21 – 24 July.	South of Ireland Championships; Limerick, Ireland; Grass; Singles – Doubles	Challenger (Ireland) Thomas Harrison Griffiths		(Ireland) William Drumond Hamilton	(Ireland) Nicholas Trafalgar Biddulph (Ireland) R.C. Hamilton				
22–24 Jul.	Leicester Lawn Tennis Club Tournament; Leicester, England; Grass; Singles – Doubles	(United Kingdom) Charles Hoadley Ashe Ross; 1–6, 6–1, 6–3, 6–4	(United Kingdom) John Redfern Deykin	(United Kingdom) William Nevill Cobbold (United Kingdom) Frank Noon	(Ireland) Alfred Henry Betham (United Kingdom) Percy Bateman Brown (United Kingdom) George Ernest Dixon Brown (United Kingdom) G.F. Mitton				
20–27 Jul	Northern Counties Challenge Cup; Norton, County Durham, England; Grass; Singles – Doubles	(United Kingdom) E.W. Fletcher; 6–0, 6–3, 3–6, 6–4	(United Kingdom) A. Dunn jr.	(United Kingdom) Kenneth Ramsden Marley	(United Kingdom) Arthur Burgess Crosby (United Kingdom) John Hartley (United Kingdom) Arthur Godfrey Pease				
20–27 Jul	Norton Lawn Tennis Open Tournament; Norton, County Durham, England; Grass; Singles – Doubles	(United Kingdom) George Richmond Mewburn; 6–4, 6–4, 2–6, 7–5	(United Kingdom) B. Hartley	(United Kingdom) Charles Liddell (United Kingdom) Seward Wilfrid Meek					
22–27 Jul	Athboy Lawn Tennis Club Open Tournament; Athboy Lawn Tennis Club; Athboy, County Meath, Ireland. Outdoor; Grass; Singles	(Scotland) Mr. Owens; 6–3, 6–2	(United Kingdom) R. Graham	(United Kingdom) W.M. Hayes (United Kingdom) G.H. Orpen	(Ireland) J. Chadwick (Ireland) Herbert Newcombe Craig (United Kingdom) C. Osborne (United Kingdom) F.S.C. Ruthven				
23–27 Jul.	Molesey Park Lawn Tennis Tournament; The Reddings; Moseley, Staffordshire, England; Grass; Singles – Doubles	(United Kingdom) George Reston Brewerton; 6–2, 6–1, 6–2	(United Kingdom) R.H. Davidson	(United Kingdom) E.B. Crockford (United Kingdom) Herbert Haden Monckton	(England) W. Hasluck (United Kingdom) M.P. Lea (United Kingdom) T.H. Spencer (United Kingdom) S. Smith				
23–27 Jul.	Molesey Park Lawn Tennis Tournament; The Reddings; Moseley, Staffordshire, England; Grass; Singles – Doubles	(United Kingdom) R.H. Davidson (United Kingdom) Mr. Hossell; 6–1, 2–6, 6–2	(England) E.B. Crockford Brown (England) W. J. Crockford	(United Kingdom) E.B. Crockford (United Kingdom) Herbert Haden Monckton	(England) W. Hasluck (United Kingdom) M.P. Lea (United Kingdom) T.H. Spencer (United Kingdom) S. Smith				
26–28 Jul	Leamington Open Tournament; Leamington LTC; Leamington Spa, Warwickshire, England; Grass; Singles – Doubles	(Ireland) Alfred Henry Betham; 8–6, 8–6, 6–4	(United Kingdom) Harry Grove	(United Kingdom) Francis Russell Burrow (United Kingdom) Charles Hoadley Ashe Ross	(United Kingdom) H.P. Darling (United Kingdom) John Redfern Deykin (United Kingdom) L. Richardson (United Kingdom) Edmund Henry Lacon-Watson				
26–28 Jul	Warwickshire Championships; Leamington LTC; Leamington Spa, Warwickshire, England; Grass; Singles – Doubles	(United Kingdom) John Redfern Deykin; 6–2, 6–2	(United Kingdom) H. Brain	(United Kingdom) Albert Cecil Hill (United Kingdom) Harry T. Shapley	(United Kingdom) W. Downing (United Kingdom) J. Goodacre (United Kingdom) A. Jackson (United Kingdom) A.P. Pridmore				
27–30 Jul.	Edinburgh International Exhibition Tournament; Exhibition grounds Edinburgh, Lothian, Scotland. Clay	(Scotland) Archibald Thomson; 6–2, 6–2, 2–0 ret.	(United Kingdom) J. Frances	(Scotland) Alfred Aitken Thomson (Scotland) Richard Millar Watson	(Scotland) S. Collins (United Kingdom) J.C. Huie (Scotland) J. Monteith (England) Arthur Nevile John Story				
27–31 July.	North Wales Challenge Cup; Vale of Clwyd LTC; Denbigh, Vale of Clwyd, Wales; Outdoor; Grass; Singles	(Wales) G. Egerton; 6–3, 6–4	(Wales) H. Lloyd Williams	(United Kingdom of Great Britain and Ireland) E.L. Engleheart (England) Henry James Wilson Fosbery	(Wales) J.P. Lewis (United Kingdom of Great Britain and Ireland) P. Ormrod (Wales) H. Lloyd-Parry (United Kingdom of Great Britain and Ireland) E.A. Turnour				
27–31 July.	North Wales Challenge Cup; Vale of Clwyd LTC; Denbigh, Vale of Clwyd, Wales; Outdoor; Grass; Singles	Challenger (Wales) R. Lloyd Williams		(United Kingdom of Great Britain and Ireland) E.L. Engleheart (England) Henry James Wilson Fosbery	(Wales) J.P. Lewis (United Kingdom of Great Britain and Ireland) P. Ormrod (Wales) H. Lloyd-Parry (United Kingdom of Great Britain and Ireland) E.A. Turnour				
27–31 Jul.	Canadian International Championships; Toronto LTC; Toronto, Ontario, Canada; Grass; Singles – Doubles	(Canada) Charles Smith Hyman; 6–4 6–4 1–6 4–6 6–4	(Canada) Isidore Frederick Hellmuth	(Canada) H.H. Abbott jr (Canada) W.E. Hodgman	(Canada) Robert Casimir Dickson (Canada) A.L. McEwen (Canada) Raynald D'Arcy Gamble (Canada) Alexander Torrance				
28–31 Jul	Northumberland Championships; Newcastle upon Tyne, Great Britain; Singles – Doubles	(Scotland) Patrick Bowes-Lyon; 6–3 6–0 6–0	(United Kingdom) Kenneth Ramsden Marley						
30–31 Jul.	Staten Island Invitation; Staten Island Cricket & Baseball Club; Livingston, Staten Island, New York City, United States; Grass; Singles – Doubles	(United States) James Brown; 6–3, 6–2, 6–1	(United States) E.W. Gould	(United States) Basil Spalding de Garmendia	(United States) R.H. Nathan (United States) Mr. Waldron				

=== August ===
Date	Tournament	Winner	Finalist	Semi finalist	Quarter finalist
August.	Mossley Hall Challenge Cup; Bar Harbor Club; Bar Harbor, Maine, United States; Singles – Doubles	(United States) Joseph Sill Clark Sr. 6–2 7–9 6–4 7–5	(United States) ?		
August.	Manitoba Championships; Manitoba LTC; Manitoba College, Winnipeg, Manitoba, Canada; Grass; Singles; Doubles	(United Kingdom of Great Britain and Ireland) A.H. Dickens ?	(Canada) ?		
July– August	Inverkip Rovers Open; Castle Wemyss; Wemyss Bay, Scotland; Grass; Singles	(England) Charles H. J. Higginbotham; 7–5, 6–4, 0–6, 6–4	(Scotland) Horatio Renaud Babington Peile	(Scotland) Walter Robert Baines Latham	(Scotland) T.F. Donald (Scotland) D.M. Hannay
July– August	Inverkip Rovers Open; Castle Wemyss; Wemyss Bay, Scotland; Grass; Singles	Challenger (Scotland) G.H. Aitken		(Scotland) Walter Robert Baines Latham	(Scotland) T.F. Donald (Scotland) D.M. Hannay
July– August	Inverkip Rovers Open; Castle Wemyss; Wemyss Bay, Scotland; Grass; Singles	(England) Charles H. J. Higginbotham (Scotland) D.M. Hannay; 5–6, 3–6, 6–3, 6–5, 6–4	(Scotland) Walter Robert Baines Latham (Scotland) T.F. Donald	(Scotland) Walter Robert Baines Latham	(Scotland) T.F. Donald (Scotland) D.M. Hannay
July– August	Inverkip Rovers Open; Castle Wemyss; Wemyss Bay, Scotland; Grass; Singles	(Scotland) G.H. Aitken (Scotland) Miss Macquisten; 2 sets to 0	(Scotland) D.M. Hannay (Scotland) Miss Macquisten	(Scotland) Walter Robert Baines Latham	(Scotland) T.F. Donald (Scotland) D.M. Hannay
27 July–2 August.	East of Ireland Championships; Howth, Ireland; Grass; Singles – Doubles	(Ireland) Willoughby Hamilton; 6–4, 6–1, 6–4	(Ireland) Toler Roberts Garvey		
28 Jul–2 Aug.	Rockaway Hunting Club Invitation; Rockaway Hunting Club; Lawrence, Nassau County, New York, United States; Grass; Singles – Doubles	(United States) Henry Slocum; 6–3, 6–2, 6–1	(United States) Oliver Samuel Campbell	(United States) William Austin Tomes (United States) Philip Shelton Sears	
30 Jul–2 Aug. (Note: The British Columbia Championships were staged from 1886 to 1976.)	British Columbia Championships; Victoria Lawn Tennis Club; Vancouver, BC, Canada; Grass; Singles; Doubles	(Canada) R.H. Handcock ?	(United Kingdom) Julian Charles Gaisford		
30 Jul–2 Aug.	Rochester Open; Paddock Lawn Tennis Club; Rochester, Kent, England; Grass; Singles	(United Kingdom of Great Britain and Ireland) David Elgar Payn; 8–4, 6–4, 6–3	(United Kingdom of Great Britain and Ireland) Alfred E. Walker	(United Kingdom of Great Britain and Ireland) R.G. Bailey	(United Kingdom of Great Britain and Ireland) A. Buchanan (United Kingdom of Great Britain and Ireland) C.H. Byers (United Kingdom of Great Britain and Ireland) Reverend Dale (United Kingdom of Great Britain and Ireland) Mr. Horsburgh
3–5 Aug.	Seabright Invitational Tournament; Seabright Lawn Tennis and Cricket Club; Rumson, New Jersey, United States; Grass; Singles – Doubles	(United States) H.W. Bucknall; 6–2 6–1 6–1	(United States) Richard W. Stevens	(United States) J.A. Turnbull	
2–6 Aug	Darlington Association Tournament; Darlington, County Durham, England; Grass; Singles – Doubles	(Scotland) Patrick Bowes-Lyon ?	(United Kingdom) Arthur Wellesley Hallward	(England) Thomas Robinson Grey (England) George Richmond Mewburn	(England) Theodore Coventry (England) Norman Leslie Hallward (Scotland) John Galbraith Horn (United Kingdom) Captain G.R. Taylor
2–6 Aug	Darlington Association Tournament; Darlington, County Durham, England; Grass; Singles – Doubles	Challenger (England) Arthur Godfrey Pease		(England) Thomas Robinson Grey (England) George Richmond Mewburn	(England) Theodore Coventry (England) Norman Leslie Hallward (Scotland) John Galbraith Horn (United Kingdom) Captain G.R. Taylor
2–6 Aug	Darlington Association Tournament; Darlington, County Durham, England; Grass; Singles – Doubles	(Scotland) Patrick Bowes-Lyon (Scotland) John Galbraith Horn; 6–3, 6–3, 7–5	(England) Arthur Godfrey Pease (England) George Richmond Mewburn	(England) Thomas Robinson Grey (England) George Richmond Mewburn	(England) Theodore Coventry (England) Norman Leslie Hallward (Scotland) John Galbraith Horn (United Kingdom) Captain G.R. Taylor
2–6 Aug	Darlington Association Tournament; Darlington, County Durham, England; Grass; Singles – Doubles	(Scotland) Patrick Bowes-Lyon (England) Florence Stanuell; 6–1, 7–5	(Scotland) John Galbraith Horn (England) Connie Butler	(England) Thomas Robinson Grey (England) George Richmond Mewburn	(England) Theodore Coventry (England) Norman Leslie Hallward (Scotland) John Galbraith Horn (United Kingdom) Captain G.R. Taylor
2–7 Aug.	Waterford Annual Lawn Tennis Tournament; Rocklands, Waterford, Ireland; Grass; Singles – Doubles	(Ireland) William Drumond Hamilton; 6–4, 3–6, 6–1, 0–6, 6–0	(United Kingdom of Great Britain and Ireland) Arthur Henry Gore Ashe	(Ireland) John M. Brown (Ireland) Frederick William Knox	(Ireland) William Gore Burroughs (Ireland) Henry Joseph Gallwey (Scotland) J. Gore (Ireland) R.P. Hamilton
2–7 Aug.	Waterford Annual Lawn Tennis Tournament; Rocklands, Waterford, Ireland; Grass; Singles – Doubles	Challenger (Ireland) Toler Roberts Garvey		(Ireland) John M. Brown (Ireland) Frederick William Knox	(Ireland) William Gore Burroughs (Ireland) Henry Joseph Gallwey (Scotland) J. Gore (Ireland) R.P. Hamilton
2–7 August.	Berrylands Club Tournament; Berrylands LTC; Surbiton, Surrey, England; Outdoor; Grass; Singles	(United Kingdom) R. Playford w.o.	(United Kingdom) L. Newton	(United Kingdom) J.F. Newton (United Kingdom) A.B. Tomkins	(United Kingdom) G.A. Bolton (United Kingdom) E.O. Dunn (United Kingdom) F. Rawlings (United Kingdom) L.H. Shadbolt
2–7 August	Exmouth Lawn Tennis Club Tournament; Exmouth, Great Britain; Singles – Doubles	(United Kingdom) Harry Grove; 6–2 7–9 6–4 7–5	(United Kingdom) Henry Edwin Hunter Kent		
5–7 August.	North of Wales Open; Pensarn LTC; Abergele, Conwy County Borough, North Wales; Grass; Singles – Doubles	(United Kingdom of Great Britain and Ireland) Percy Short; 6–2 7–9 7–5 2–6 6–1	(Wales) W. Lifton Wynne	(Ireland) C. Roberts (United Kingdom of Great Britain and Ireland) F.C. Varey	(England) John Parsons Earwaker (England) E. Johnson (United Kingdom of Great Britain and Ireland) A.E. Parkinson (Wales) R.M. Wynne
5–7 August.	Hull Westbourne Avenue Tournament; Westbourne Avenue LTC; Kingston upon Hull, England; Outdoor; Grass; Singles – Doubles	(Ireland) William Henry Mahon; 6–1, 6–2, 6–2	(United Kingdom) L. Harrison	(Scotland) Thomas Barton Holmes (England) Charles Edmund Tatham	(England) R.H.H. Harker (England) PF.N. Harrison (England) Arthur Godfrey Pease (United Kingdom) A. Priestman
5–7 August.	Hull Westbourne Avenue Tournament; Westbourne Avenue LTC; Kingston upon Hull, England; Outdoor; Grass; Singles – Doubles	(United Kingdom) Geoffrey Meynell Heathcote-Hacker (England) R.H.H. Harker; 6–4, 6–3	(United Kingdom) Mr. Grotrian (United Kingdom) Mr. Peterson	(Scotland) Thomas Barton Holmes (England) Charles Edmund Tatham	(England) R.H.H. Harker (England) PF.N. Harrison (England) Arthur Godfrey Pease (United Kingdom) A. Priestman
5–7 August.	Hull Westbourne Avenue Tournament; Westbourne Avenue LTC; Kingston upon Hull, England; Outdoor; Grass; Singles – Doubles	(United Kingdom) F.J. Hirst (United Kingdom) Mabel Boulton; 6–4, 6–5	(England) Alexander Walton McIlwaine (United Kingdom) Miss A. Thorney	(Scotland) Thomas Barton Holmes (England) Charles Edmund Tatham	(England) R.H.H. Harker (England) PF.N. Harrison (England) Arthur Godfrey Pease (United Kingdom) A. Priestman
3–8 Aug.	Wentworth Open Tournament; Hotel Wentworth; New Castle, New Hampshire, United States; Grass; Singles – Doubles	(United States) Joseph Sill Clark Sr. 6–3, 6–4, 6–4	(United States) William V.S. Thorne	(United States) Walter Van Rensselaer Berry (United States) Henry Slocum	(United States) Oliver Samuel Campbell (United States) Charles Amherst Chase (United States) Wallace Percy Knapp (United States) Philip Shelton Sears
10 Aug.	Cooperstown Open; Cooperstown, United States; Grass; Singles – Doubles	(United States) Valentine Gill Hall; 6–4, 8–6, 6–3	(United States) Walter Van Rensselaer Berry	(United States) Wallace Percy Knapp (United States) Oliver Samuel Campbell	
9–11 Aug.	South Wales and Monmouthshire Championships; Tenby LTC; Tenby, Pembrokeshire, Wales; Outdoor; Grass; Singles – Doubles	(Wales) William Sidney Nelson Heard; 6–0, 6–1, 6–1	(United Kingdom) James Baldwin	(Wales) Henry Stafford Brenchley (Wales) E.W. Davies	
11 Aug.	Gore Court Championships; Sittingbourne, Gore Court Archery and LTC; Gore Court, Sittingbourne, Great Britain; Outdoor; Grass; Singles	(United Kingdom) Charles Gladstone Eames (United Kingdom) Ernest George Meers shared title		(United Kingdom) G.S. Bigg	(United Kingdom) Wilberforce Eaves (United Kingdom) FitzJames Hynes (United Kingdom) Arthur Pantin (United Kingdom) David Elgar Payn
9–12 August	East Grinstead Lawn Tennis Club Tournament; East Grinstead, England; Grass; Singles – Doubles	(United Kingdom) Charles Hoadley Ashe Ross; 6–3, 6–2	(United Kingdom) W.E. Seldon	(United Kingdom) William Nevill Cobbold (United Kingdom) David Elgar Payn Rawlinson	(United Kingdom) J.M. Atkinson (United Kingdom) J.A. Heyman (United Kingdom) A.H. Robinson (England) Herbert Charles Yockney
9–12 August	East Grinstead Lawn Tennis Club Tournament; East Grinstead, England; Grass; Singles – Doubles	(United Kingdom) Charles Hoadley Ashe Ross (United Kingdom) William Nevill Cobbold; 6–2, 6–0	(United Kingdom) Wilfred Baddeley (United Kingdom) Neville Baddeley	(United Kingdom) William Nevill Cobbold (United Kingdom) David Elgar Payn Rawlinson	(United Kingdom) J.M. Atkinson (United Kingdom) J.A. Heyman (United Kingdom) A.H. Robinson (England) Herbert Charles Yockney
9–12 August	East Grinstead Lawn Tennis Club Tournament; East Grinstead, England; Grass; Singles – Doubles	(United Kingdom) William Nevill Cobbold (United Kingdom) Miss Cobbold; 7–5, 6–2	(England) Herbert Charles Yockney (United Kingdom) May Jacks	(United Kingdom) William Nevill Cobbold (United Kingdom) David Elgar Payn Rawlinson	(United Kingdom) J.M. Atkinson (United Kingdom) J.A. Heyman (United Kingdom) A.H. Robinson (England) Herbert Charles Yockney
9–13 Aug.	Teignmouth and Shaldon Open; Teignmouth LTC; Teignmouth, Devon, England; Grass; Singles	(United Kingdom of Great Britain and Ireland) Ernest Wool Lewis; 6–1 6–0 6–0|	(United Kingdom of Great Britain and Ireland) Robert Charles Thompson	(United Kingdom of Great Britain and Ireland) Ferguson G. Davies (United Kingdom of Great Britain and Ireland) Stanley Riseley	(United Kingdom of Great Britain and Ireland) C.H. Davies (Wales) William Sidney Nelson Heard (United Kingdom of Great Britain and Ireland) John Charles Kay (United Kingdom of Great Britain and Ireland) Edward Armstrong O'Neill
10–13 August.	Nahant Invitation; Nahant Sporting Club; Nahant, Massachusetts, United States; Clay; Singles – Doubles	(United States) Howard Augustus Taylor; 6–5, 1–6, 6–4	(United States) Robert Livingston Beeckman	(United States) Godfrey Malbone Brinley	
11–14 August. (Note: The East of England Championships ran from 1885 until 1981. Originally called the Felixstowe Annual Lawn Tennis Tournament its title changed to the East of England Championships in 1889. The Event is still staged today as a LTA British Tour (Premier Event) formally known as East of England)	East of England Championships; Felixstowe Lawn Tennis Club; Felixstowe, Suffolk, England; Grass; Singles – Doubles	(United Kingdom of Great Britain and Ireland) Alfred Penn Gaskell; 5–6, 6–3, 6–3	(United Kingdom of Great Britain and Ireland) Charles Hoadley Ashe Ross		
12–14 August.	Penzance Open; Penzance LTC; Penzance, Cornwall, England; Outdoor; Grass; Singles – Doubles	(Ireland) St Clair Kelburn Mulholland Stobart; 6–1 6–2	(England) George Arthur Ley Woolcombe	(United Kingdom) E.H. Oldham (Scotland) W.C. Perry	(United Kingdom) C.R. Broad (United Kingdom) F.A. Jones (United Kingdom) Mr. Mayers
12–14 August.	Penzance Open; Penzance LTC; Penzance, Cornwall, England; Outdoor; Grass; Singles – Doubles	(United Kingdom) Rev. Lancelot Melvill Haslope (United Kingdom) E.H. Oldham def.	(United Kingdom) F.A. Jones (Ireland) St Clair Kelburn Mulholland Stobart.	(United Kingdom) E.H. Oldham (Scotland) W.C. Perry	(United Kingdom) C.R. Broad (United Kingdom) F.A. Jones (United Kingdom) Mr. Mayers
12–14 August.	Penzance Open; Penzance LTC; Penzance, Cornwall, England; Outdoor; Grass; Singles – Doubles	(United Kingdom) Rev. Lancelot Melvill Haslope (United Kingdom) Mrs. Lancelot Melvill Haslope def.	(Ireland) St Clair Kelburn Mulholland Stobart. (United Kingdom) Mrs. Mabel St Clair Stobart.	(United Kingdom) E.H. Oldham (Scotland) W.C. Perry	(United Kingdom) C.R. Broad (United Kingdom) F.A. Jones (United Kingdom) Mr. Mayers
16–17 August.	Charmouth Open; Charmouth LTC; Charmouth, West Dorset, England; Outdoor; Grass; Singles	(United Kingdom of Great Britain and Ireland) Reginald Huyshe-Eliot; 6–0, 6–5	(United Kingdom of Great Britain and Ireland) J.P. Paull	(United Kingdom of Great Britain and Ireland) Arthur Preston	(United Kingdom of Great Britain and Ireland) Charles Forrest Lovibond (United Kingdom of Great Britain and Ireland) Mr. Pilgrim (United Kingdom of Great Britain and Ireland) Mr. Tripp
16–17 August.	Charmouth Open; Charmouth LTC; Charmouth, West Dorset, England; Outdoor; Grass; Singles	(United Kingdom of Great Britain and Ireland) Mr. Pilgrim (United Kingdom of Great Britain and Ireland) Miss Arundell; 1–6, 6–2, 6–4	(United Kingdom of Great Britain and Ireland) Reginald Huyshe-Eliot (United Kingdom of Great Britain and Ireland) Miss. Hillmann	(United Kingdom of Great Britain and Ireland) Arthur Preston	(United Kingdom of Great Britain and Ireland) Charles Forrest Lovibond (United Kingdom of Great Britain and Ireland) Mr. Pilgrim (United Kingdom of Great Britain and Ireland) Mr. Tripp
16–19 August.	County Cavan Lawn Tennis Tournament (later County Cavan Championships); County Cavan LTC, Cavan, Ireland; Outdoor; Grass; Singles – Doubles	(Ireland) William Percy – French ?	(Ireland) ?		
17–19 August. (Note: The Niagara International Tournament ran from 1885 until 1923.)	Niagara International Tournament; Queen's Royal Hotel Court's; Niagara-on-the-Lake, Ontario, Canada; Grass; Singles – Doubles	? ?	?		
18–19 Aug.	Macclesfield Open; Macclesfield Lawn Tennis Club; Macclesfield, England; Grass; Singles – Doubles	(United Kingdom of Great Britain and Ireland) Walter Reid Craig; 9–11 6–2 6–4	(United Kingdom of Great Britain and Ireland) B. King	(United Kingdom of Great Britain and Ireland) C.F.G. Lathom (United Kingdom of Great Britain and Ireland) Elliott L. Oliver	(United Kingdom) P.W. Allen (United Kingdom) W.A. Brewerton (United Kingdom) W. Burgess (United Kingdom) John Barlow Thistlethwaite
17–20 Aug.	Saxmundham Lawn Tennis Tournament; Saxmundham Lawn Tennis Club; Hurts Hill Park, Saxmundham, England; Grass; Saxmundham Lawn Tennis Tournament – Doubles	(United Kingdom of Great Britain and Ireland) William Herbert Cohen; 7–5 7–5	(United Kingdom of Great Britain and Ireland) Oswald Milne	(United Kingdom of Great Britain and Ireland) Harold (Harry) Bacon (United Kingdom of Great Britain and Ireland) F.D. Colt	(United Kingdom) R.C. Bacon (United Kingdom) Edward Lee French (United Kingdom) B. Hawes (United Kingdom) Francis William Monement
16–21 Aug.	Tenby Open; Tenby LTC; Tenby, Pembrokeshire, Wales; Outdoor; Grass; Singles – Doubles	(England) James Baldwin; 6–0 6–1 6–1	(United Kingdom of Great Britain and Ireland) E.W. David	(United Kingdom of Great Britain and Ireland) J.T. Jones (England) Walter Mace Shipman	(Wales) William Sidney Nelson Heard (United Kingdom of Great Britain and Ireland) S.W. Smith (Ireland) James Edgar Lefroy Stein (United Kingdom of Great Britain and Ireland) Captain G.R. Taylor
17–21 August.	King's County and Ormonde Tournament; Parsonstown, Ireland; Grass; Singles – Doubles	(Ireland) Toler Roberts Garvey w.o.	(Ireland) Arthur John de Courcy Wilson	(Ireland) Charles Thomas Biddulph (Ireland) Hume Riversdale Jones	(Ireland) Nicholas Trafalgar Biddulph (Ireland) George Bloomfield Garvey (Scotland) Alexander Francis Grant Foulerton (United Kingdom of Great Britain and Ireland) Stanley E. Smith
17–21 Aug.	Yorkshire Lawn Tennis Tournament (later Yorkshire Championships); Harrogate Cricket Club; Harrogate, Yorkshire, England; Grass; Singles – Doubles	(Ireland) Ernest Browne; 3–6, 4–6, 6–4, 6–4, 6–4	(United Kingdom of Great Britain and Ireland) Gilbert Mahon	(United Kingdom of Great Britain and Ireland) E.W. Fletcher (England) Arthur Godfrey Pease	(England) George Reston Brewerton (United Kingdom of Great Britain and Ireland) J.S. Burton (United Kingdom of Great Britain and Ireland) Alexander Mallinson (England) George Richmond Mewburn
17–21 Aug.	Yorkshire Lawn Tennis Tournament (later Yorkshire Championships); Harrogate Cricket Club; Harrogate, Yorkshire, England; Grass; Singles – Doubles	(Ireland) Ernest Browne (United Kingdom of Great Britain and Ireland) E.W. Fletcher; 6–2, 6–1, 6–3	(England) George Richmond Mewburn (England) Arthur Godfrey Pease	(United Kingdom of Great Britain and Ireland) E.W. Fletcher (England) Arthur Godfrey Pease	(England) George Reston Brewerton (United Kingdom of Great Britain and Ireland) J.S. Burton (United Kingdom of Great Britain and Ireland) Alexander Mallinson (England) George Richmond Mewburn
17–21 Aug.	Yorkshire Lawn Tennis Tournament (later Yorkshire Championships); Harrogate Cricket Club; Harrogate, Yorkshire, England; Grass; Singles – Doubles	(United Kingdom of Great Britain and Ireland) B. Hartley (England) Mabel Boulton; 6–4, 6–4	(Scotland) John Galbraith Horn (England) Clara Hill	(United Kingdom of Great Britain and Ireland) E.W. Fletcher (England) Arthur Godfrey Pease	(England) George Reston Brewerton (United Kingdom of Great Britain and Ireland) J.S. Burton (United Kingdom of Great Britain and Ireland) Alexander Mallinson (England) George Richmond Mewburn
18–21 August	Kursaal LTC Tournament; Kursaal LTC; Bad Homburg vor der Höhe, Germany; Clay; Singles – Doubles	(United Kingdom of Great Britain and Ireland) H. Gillbanks; 6–3, 6–3, 7–5	(United Kingdom of Great Britain and Ireland) M. Morris		
19–21 August	Northwestern Championships; St. Paul, MN, United States; Singles – Doubles	(United States) W.N. Armstrong; 6–5 6–1 6–2	(United States) Harry P. Robinson		
18–22 Aug	South of Scotland Championships; Moffat, Scotland; Grass; Singles – Doubles	(Scotland) Archibald Thomson; 6–3, 6–0, 6–4	(United Kingdom of Great Britain and Ireland) J.M. Dickson	(United Kingdom of Great Britain and Ireland) P.G. Hall (Scotland) Alfred Aitken Thomson	
18–22 Aug	South of Scotland Championships; Moffat, Scotland; Grass; Singles – Doubles	Challenger (United Kingdom of Great Britain and Ireland) T.G. Hill		(United Kingdom of Great Britain and Ireland) P.G. Hall (Scotland) Alfred Aitken Thomson	
18–22 Aug	South of Scotland Championships; Moffat, Scotland; Grass; Singles – Doubles	(Scotland) Alfred Aitken Thomson (Scotland) Archibald Thomson; 6–3, 6–3, 12–10	(Scotland) Edward B. Morrison (United Kingdom of Great Britain and Ireland) Mr. White	(United Kingdom of Great Britain and Ireland) P.G. Hall (Scotland) Alfred Aitken Thomson	
18–22 Aug	South of Scotland Championships; Moffat, Scotland; Grass; Singles – Doubles	(Scotland) Edward B. Morrison (Scotland) Miss Lottie Paterson; 0–6, 7–5, 6–3	(Scotland) Richard Millar Watson (England) Annie Dod	(United Kingdom of Great Britain and Ireland) P.G. Hall (Scotland) Alfred Aitken Thomson	
19–23 Aug.	Dundrum Open; Dundrum LTC; Dundrum, Dublin, Ireland; Grass; Singles – Doubles	(Ireland) William Drummond Hamilton; 6–1, 6–4, 6–3	(Ireland) Arthur Henry Gore Ashe	(Ireland) S. Franks (Ireland) John H. Bedat-Whaite	(Ireland) Reginald Arthur Gamble (Ireland) William Woodcock Goodbody (Ireland) Willoughby Hamilton (Ireland) H.J. Maguire
23–25 Aug.	Colwyn Bay Lawn Tennis Tournament; Pwyllycrochan Park; Colwyn Bay, Wales; Grass; Singles – Doubles	(United Kingdom of Great Britain and Ireland) A.S. Soden; 6–3, 4–6, 6–4, 2–6, 6–0	(England) Charles John Cole	(United Kingdom of Great Britain and Ireland) W.F. Gorton (United Kingdom of Great Britain and Ireland) A.S.H. Wood	(United Kingdom of Great Britain and Ireland) C. Bishop (United Kingdom of Great Britain and Ireland) C.W. Pearcely (United Kingdom of Great Britain and Ireland) R.H. Legge (United Kingdom of Great Britain and Ireland) F.M. Rowland
24–27 Aug	Bournemouth Lawn Tennis Club Tournament; Bournemouth, England; Grass; Singles – Doubles	(United Kingdom of Great Britain and Ireland) Ernest Wool Lewis; 6–0, 6–1, 6–2	(United Kingdom of Great Britain and Ireland) James Edgar Lefroy Stein	(United Kingdom of Great Britain and Ireland) Henry Francis Herford (United Kingdom of Great Britain and Ireland) C.F. Palmer	(United Kingdom of Great Britain and Ireland) H.S. Gover (United Kingdom of Great Britain and Ireland) Booth Hodgetts Lynes (United Kingdom of Great Britain and Ireland) David Elgar Payn (United Kingdom of Great Britain and Ireland) F.W. Randall
24–27 Aug	Bournemouth Lawn Tennis Club Tournament; Bournemouth, England; Grass; Singles – Doubles	Challenger (United Kingdom of Great Britain and Ireland) H.M. Nicholls		(United Kingdom of Great Britain and Ireland) Henry Francis Herford (United Kingdom of Great Britain and Ireland) C.F. Palmer	(United Kingdom of Great Britain and Ireland) H.S. Gover (United Kingdom of Great Britain and Ireland) Booth Hodgetts Lynes (United Kingdom of Great Britain and Ireland) David Elgar Payn (United Kingdom of Great Britain and Ireland) F.W. Randall
24–27 Aug	Bournemouth Lawn Tennis Club Tournament; Bournemouth, England; Grass; Singles – Doubles	(United Kingdom of Great Britain and Ireland) Ernest Wool Lewis (United Kingdom of Great Britain and Ireland) Mr. Lewis; 6–3, 6–4	(United Kingdom of Great Britain and Ireland) Harry Saint John Hornby (United Kingdom of Great Britain and Ireland) J.E. Passmore	(United Kingdom of Great Britain and Ireland) Henry Francis Herford (United Kingdom of Great Britain and Ireland) C.F. Palmer	(United Kingdom of Great Britain and Ireland) H.S. Gover (United Kingdom of Great Britain and Ireland) Booth Hodgetts Lynes (United Kingdom of Great Britain and Ireland) David Elgar Payn (United Kingdom of Great Britain and Ireland) F.W. Randall
24–27 Aug	Bournemouth Lawn Tennis Club Tournament; Bournemouth, England; Grass; Singles – Doubles	(United Kingdom of Great Britain and Ireland) Leslie C. Wintle (United Kingdom of Great Britain and Ireland) Miss Vaughan; 6–2, 6–3	(United Kingdom of Great Britain and Ireland) D.W. Donaldson (United Kingdom of Great Britain and Ireland) Miss Palmer	(United Kingdom of Great Britain and Ireland) Henry Francis Herford (United Kingdom of Great Britain and Ireland) C.F. Palmer	(United Kingdom of Great Britain and Ireland) H.S. Gover (United Kingdom of Great Britain and Ireland) Booth Hodgetts Lynes (United Kingdom of Great Britain and Ireland) David Elgar Payn (United Kingdom of Great Britain and Ireland) F.W. Randall
23–28 August	Derbyshire Championships; Buxton, Great Britain; Singles – Doubles	(Ireland) Tom Campion; 5–7 6–2 6–1 9–7	(United Kingdom) Percy Bateman Brown		
23–28 August	US National Championships; Newport, United States; Singles – Doubles	(United States) Richard Sears; 4–6 6–1 6–3 6–4	(United States) Robert Livingston Beeckman		
23–28 August	US National Championships; Newport, United States; Singles – Doubles	(United States) Richard Sears (United States) James Dwight; 7–5, 5–7, 7–5, 6–4	(United States) Howard Taylor (United States) Godfrey Brinley		
25–28 Aug.	Devon and Cornwall Archery Society Lawn Tennis Tournament; Manadon, Plymouth, England; Grass; Singles – Doubles	(Germany) Gerhard Franz Mockler; 6–4 6–3	(United Kingdom of Great Britain and Ireland) Patrick Blackburne	(United Kingdom of Great Britain and Ireland) T.H. Gill (United Kingdom of Great Britain and Ireland) H.G. Hawker	(United Kingdom of Great Britain and Ireland) Shirley Blackburne (United Kingdom of Great Britain and Ireland) Charles Ernest M. Kelly (United Kingdom of Great Britain and Ireland) C.E. Radcliffe (United Kingdom of Great Britain and Ireland) Mr. Swanton
27–28 Aug.	Whitby Open Lawn Tennis Tournament; West Cliff Tennis Grounds; Whitby, North Yorkshire, England; Outdoor; Grass; Singles – Doubles	(United Kingdom of Great Britain and Ireland) Philip Leslie Hirst; 3–6, 6–1, 6–3, 6–5	(United Kingdom of Great Britain and Ireland) George Reston Brewerton	(United Kingdom of Great Britain and Ireland) Harold Stapylton Greenwell (United Kingdom of Great Britain and Ireland) Francis Joseph Hirst	(United Kingdom of Great Britain and Ireland) A. Herbert (United Kingdom of Great Britain and Ireland) Charles E. Mackenzie Kelly (United Kingdom of Great Britain and Ireland) Guy A. Robins (United Kingdom of Great Britain and Ireland) W.S. Wright
27–28 August	Lyme Regis Tournament; Lyme Regis Recreation Grounds; Lyme Regis, England; Clay; Singles – Doubles	(United Kingdom of Great Britain and Ireland) A.R. Ford; 1–6, 6–5, 6–3	(United Kingdom of Great Britain and Ireland) R.J. Hutchinson	(United Kingdom of Great Britain and Ireland) W.Y. Caistor (United Kingdom of Great Britain and Ireland) H. Eliot	(United Kingdom of Great Britain and Ireland) N. Marder (United Kingdom of Great Britain and Ireland) J.H. Maund (United Kingdom of Great Britain and Ireland) Frederick Dorville Jackson (United Kingdom of Great Britain and Ireland) T. Preston

=== September ===
Date	Tournament	Winner	Finalist	Semi finalist	Quarter finalist
September (Autumn)	Hendon Lawn Tennis Tournament; Hendon LTC; Little Sherrock Field, Hendon, Middlesex England; Clay; Singles – Doubles	(United States) William Howard; 6–0, 2–6, 6–3, 4–6, 6–1	(United Kingdom) J. Muir MacDonald w.o.	(United Kingdom) F. Andrew (United Kingdom) E.J. Bevan	
September (Autumn)	Hendon Lawn Tennis Tournament; Hendon LTC; Little Sherrock Field, Hendon, Middlesex England; Clay; Singles – Doubles	Challenger (United Kingdom) P.W. Squire		(United Kingdom) F. Andrew (United Kingdom) E.J. Bevan	
30 Aug – 4 Sep.	West of Ireland Championships; County Sligo Lawn Tennis Club; Ardaghowen, Sligo, Ireland; Grass; Singles – Doubles	(Ireland) Willoughby Hamilton; 6–1, 6–1, 6–3	(England) Reginald Arthur Gamble	(Ireland) E. Mack (Ireland) Captain R. Maxwell	(Ireland) A. Graham (United Kingdom of Great Britain and Ireland) Captain N. Maxwell (Ireland) Ronald M. McDougall (Ireland) Owen Wynne
30 Aug – 4 Sep.	West of Ireland Championships; County Sligo Lawn Tennis Club; Ardaghowen, Sligo, Ireland; Grass; Singles – Doubles	Challenger (United Kingdom of Great Britain and Ireland) Frederick Foster McClintock		(Ireland) E. Mack (Ireland) Captain R. Maxwell	(Ireland) A. Graham (United Kingdom of Great Britain and Ireland) Captain N. Maxwell (Ireland) Ronald M. McDougall (Ireland) Owen Wynne
4 September	Armagh Lawn Tennis Club Tournament; Armagh, Northern Ireland; Outdoor; Hard; Singles – Doubles	(Ireland) Walter Francis Templer ?	(Ireland) A. Wolfe		
30 August – 7 September	South of England Championships; Eastbourne, Great Britain; Singles – Doubles	(United Kingdom) Ernest Lewis; 6–3 6–4 6–0	(United Kingdom) Herbert Wilberforce		
4 – 7 September	New York Tennis Club Open; New York City, United States; Grass; Singles – Doubles	(United States) Oliver Samuel Campbell; 6–2, 0–6, 6–4, 8–6	(United States) Harry Farnum		
7–9 September.	Downshire Lawn Tennis Tournament; Downshire LTC; Royal Hillsborough, County Down, Northern Ireland; Outdoor; Grass	(Scotland) C.L. Graham; 6–5 4–6 6–3	(Ireland) F.G. Gordon	(Ireland) T.G. Gordon (United Kingdom of Great Britain and Ireland) H. Young	(United Kingdom of Great Britain and Ireland) G. Clarke (Scotland) O.B. Graham (Ireland) W.R. Young
7–9 Sep	West Teviotdale Open; Hawick Cricket Ground; Hawick, Teviotdale, Roxburghshire, Scotland; Grass; Singles – Doubles	(Scotland) Richard Millar Watson; 7–5 6–1 6–3	(Scotland) Forrester John Thomson	(England) H.A. Irvine (United Kingdom) C.E. Stewart	(United Kingdom) James R. Carmichael (Scotland) R.H. MacDonald (Scotland) W.R. Pringle (United Kingdom) J.R. Stewart
7–9 Sep	West Teviotdale Open; Hawick Cricket Ground; Hawick, Teviotdale, Roxburghshire, Scotland; Grass; Singles – Doubles	(Scotland) Forrester John Thomson (Scotland) Richard Millar Watson; 9–7 6–2 6–2	(England) H.A. Irvine (Scotland) R.H. MacDonald	(England) H.A. Irvine (United Kingdom) C.E. Stewart	(United Kingdom) James R. Carmichael (Scotland) R.H. MacDonald (Scotland) W.R. Pringle (United Kingdom) J.R. Stewart
7–9 Sep	West Teviotdale Open; Hawick Cricket Ground; Hawick, Teviotdale, Roxburghshire, Scotland; Grass; Singles – Doubles	(Scotland) Richard Millar Watson (Scotland) Miss Stuart; 6–2 6–3	(Scotland) Forrester John Thomson (United Kingdom) Miss Scott	(England) H.A. Irvine (United Kingdom) C.E. Stewart	(United Kingdom) James R. Carmichael (Scotland) R.H. MacDonald (Scotland) W.R. Pringle (United Kingdom) J.R. Stewart
7–9 September.	Lenox Invitation; Lenox Lawn Tennis Club; Harlem, New York, USA; Outdoor; Grass; Singles – Doubles	(United States) Robert Livingston Beeckman; 6–2, 6–3, 2–6, 6–1	(United States) Henry Slocum Jr.		
9 September.	Delaware Tennis Club Tournament; Delaware Tennis Club; Wilmington, Delaware, United States; Grass; Singles – Doubles	(United States) Charles Belmont Davis; 6–4, 6–4, 3–6, 6–2	(United States) Gustavus Remak jr		
9 September.	Delaware Tennis Club Tournament; Delaware Tennis Club; Wilmington, Delaware, United States; Grass; Singles – Doubles	(United States) Mr. Cowperthwait (United States) Gustavus Remak jr won	(United States) ? (United States) ?		
6–10 September.	Harrisburg Lawn Tennis Tournament; Harrisburg Outdoor Club; Harrisburg, Pennsylvania, USA; Singles – Doubles	(United States) Frank Beecher Wiestling ?	(United States) George Reilly Jr.		
6–10 September.	Harrisburg Lawn Tennis Tournament; Harrisburg Outdoor Club; Harrisburg, Pennsylvania, USA; Singles – Doubles	(United States) George E. Etter (United States) Mrs. Weistling won	(United States) ? (United States) ?		
7 – 10 September.	Rochester Open; Rochester Lawn Tennis Club; Rochester, New York, US; Grass; Singles – Doubles	(United States) Godfrey Malbone Brinley; 6–2 6–0 6–2	(United States) Ganson Depew	(United States) W.E. Hodgman (United States) M. McKenzie	(United States) Ernest FitzHugh Ayrault (United States) Charles Amherst Chase (United States) W.B. Lee (United States) Arthur Remington
11 September.	Montclair Open; Montclair LTC; Montclair, New Jersey, USA; Outdoor; Grass; Singles	(United States) Howard Augustus Taylor; 6–3, 6–2, 6–3	(United States) Albert Church Hamlin	(United States) Thomas Nesbitt McCarter (United States) R.S. Thomas	(United States) S. Appleton (United States) J.C. McCay (United States) J.C. Elliott (United States) H.M. Peters
6–15 September.	United Services Tennis Club Tournament; United Service Recreation Club, Portsmouth, Hampshire, England. Grass; Singles – Doubles	(United Kingdom of Great Britain and Ireland) H.M. Nicholls; 6–2 6–3	(England) Henry Blane Porter	(United Kingdom of Great Britain and Ireland) Charles Henry Saint John (United Kingdom of Great Britain and Ireland) W.A. Platt	(United Kingdom of Great Britain and Ireland) Arthur Norris Dumbleton (United Kingdom of Great Britain and Ireland) C.C. How (United Kingdom of Great Britain and Ireland) Ernest Wool Lewis (United Kingdom of Great Britain and Ireland) H. Slessor
15 -18 September.	Orange Invitation; Mountain Station, Montrose; South Orange, New Jersey, USA; Outdoor; Grass; Singles – Doubles	(United States) Godfrey Malbone Brinley; 6–0, 6–2, 6–3	(United States) J.F. Bacon	(United States) A. Keyser (United States) Howard Augustus Taylor	(United States) Oliver Samuel Campbell (United States) Albert Church Hamlin (United States) Henry Slocum Jr. (United States) C.F. Watson
18 September. (Note: The Edgewood Country Club tournament ended 13 September 1887 exact start date missing)	Edgewood Country Club Open; Edgewood Country Club; Tivoli, New York, United States; Clay; Singles – Doubles	(United States) Valentine Gill Hall			
19 – 21 –Sep.	Westchester Lawn Tennis Club (Invitation) (Waterbury Challenge Cup); Westchester Country Club; Harrison, New York, USA; Grass; Singles – Doubles	(United States) Howard Augustus Taylor; 6–3, 6–3	(United States) Henry Warner Slocum Jr.	(United States) R.L. Cutting (United States) Morton Spring Paton	(United States) W.E. Billings (United States) Deane B. Miller (United States) W.H. Sands

=== October ===
Date	Tournament	Winner	Finalist	Semi finalist	Quarter finalist
1–3 Oct.	Southern Championships; Wilmington, United States; Singles – Doubles	(United States) Charles Belmont Davis; 6–2 6–1 6–2	(United States) Edward Porter		
4 Oct.	Baltimore Invitation (later Middle Atlantic Invitation); Baltimore Cricket Club; Baltimore, Maryland, United States; Clay; Singles – Doubles	(United States) Leigh Bonsal; 6–3, 6–2, 6–4	(United States) Charles Belmont Davis		
4 Oct.	Baltimore Invitation (later Middle Atlantic Invitation); Baltimore Cricket Club; Baltimore, Maryland, United States; Clay; Singles – Doubles	(United States) Leigh Bonsal (United States) S. T. Steel won	(United States) ? (United States) Mr. Ringwood		
28 Sep–13 Oct.	Merion Cricket Club Amateur Tennis Tournament; Merion Cricket Club; Ardmore, Pennsylvania, United States; Grass; Singles – Doubles	(United States) William Linton Landreth; 6–4, 3–6, 6–3	(United States) Frederick Winslow Taylor		
9–14 Oct.	North of England Championships; Scarborough, Great Britain; Singles – Doubles	(Ireland) Ernest de Sylly Hamilton Browne; 6–3 4–6 6–3 2–6 6–2	(United Kingdom) Harry Grove		
12–14 Oct.	National Collegiate Championships; New Haven, United States; Singles – Doubles	(United States) Godfrey Brinley	(United States)		
22–26 Oct.	Victorian Championships; Melbourne, Australia; Grass; Singles – Doubles	(Australia) Walter John Carre Riddell; 3–6 6–2 6–4 6–4	(Australia) Dudley Webb		
25–30 Oct.	Punjab Lawn Tennis Championships; Lahore, Punjab, India; Grass; Singles – Doubles	(United Kingdom) Edward Lee French; 6–1, 6–4, 6–4	(United Kingdom) G.A. Ommanney	(United Kingdom) C.E. Bunbury (United Kingdom) H.J. Reid	(United Kingdom) E.W. Fletcher (Scotland) A.P. Hill (United Kingdom) J. Rickie (United Kingdom) H.J. Tuite
25–30 Oct.	Punjab Lawn Tennis Championships; Lahore, Punjab, India; Grass; Singles – Doubles	(United Kingdom) Edward Lee French (United Kingdom) A.P. Hill; 6–2, 6–1, 6–0	(United Kingdom) C.E. Bunbury (United Kingdom) Mr.Clark.	(United Kingdom) C.E. Bunbury (United Kingdom) H.J. Reid	(United Kingdom) E.W. Fletcher (Scotland) A.P. Hill (United Kingdom) J. Rickie (United Kingdom) H.J. Tuite

=== November ===
Date	Tournament	Winner	Finalist	Semi finalist	Quarter finalist
November.	Canterbury Championships (later Canterbury Open); Canterbury LTC; Lancaster Park, Christchurch, New Zealand; Grass; Singles – Doubles	(New Zealand) Minden Fenwick; 6–3 6–4, 6–3.	(New Zealand) W.V. Millton	(England) John Ferguson Jardine	(New Zealand) Joseph Penfound Grossman (New Zealand) F. Logan (New Zealand) Frederick Wilding

=== December ===
Date	Tournament	Winner	Finalist	Semi finalist	Quarter finalist
28 – 30 December	New Zealand Lawn Tennis Association Championships; Farndon, Hawke's Bay, Napier, New Zealand; Grass; Singles – Doubles	(New Zealand) Percival Clennell Fenwick; 6–2 6–0 6–4	(New Zealand) E.P. Hudson		
28 – 30 December	New Zealand Lawn Tennis Association Championships; Farndon, Hawke's Bay, Napier, New Zealand; Grass; Singles – Doubles	(New Zealand) Minden Fenwick (New Zealand) Percival Clennell Fenwick			
28 – 31 December.	Napier Open; Napier LTC; Farndon, Hawke's Bay, Napier, New Zealand; Grass; Singles – Doubles	(United Kingdom) Eric Pollard Hudson; 6–1, 6–2, 6–3.	(New Zealand) Minden Fenwick		

== Sources ==
- A. Wallis Myers, ed. (1903). Lawn Tennis at Home and Abroad (1st ed.). New York: Charles Scribner's Sons. OCLC 5358651.
- Gillmeister, Heiner (1998). Tennis:Cultural History. London: A&C Black. ISBN 9780718501952.
- Hall, Valentine Gill (1889). Lawn tennis in America. Biographical sketches of all the prominent players ... knotty points, and all the latest rules and directions governing handicaps, umpires, and rules for playing. New York, NY, USA: New York, D. W. Granbery & Co.
- Lake, Robert J. (2014). A Social History of Tennis in Britain: Volume 5 of Routledge Research in Sports History. Routledge:. ISBN 9781134445578.
- Mazak, Karoly (2017). The Concise History of Tennis. Independently published. ISBN 9781549746475.
- Nauright, John; Parrish, Charles (2012). Sports Around the World: History, Culture, and Practice. Santa Barbara, Calif.: ABC-CLIO. ISBN 9781598843002.
- Nieuwland, Alex (2009–2017). "Tournaments – Search for Tournament – Year – 1886". www.tennisarchives.com. Harlingen, Netherlands: Idzznew BV.
- Paret, Jahial Parmly; Allen, J. P.; Alexander, Frederick B.; Hardy, Samuel [from old catalog (1918). Spalding's tennis annual . New York, NY, USA: New York, American sports publishing company.

== Attribution ==
This article contains some copied and translated content from this article it:Tornei di tennis maschili nel 1886
