= Buffalo Open (tennis) =

Defunct tennis tournament
- Founded: 1885; 141 years ago
- Abolished: 1897; 129 years ago
- Location: Buffalo, New York, United States
- Venue: Summer Street Grounds
- Surface: Grass

The Buffalo Open was a grass court open tennis tournament organised by the Buffalo Lawn Tennis Club and played at the Summer Street Grounds, Buffalo, New York, United States. It was established in 1885. The tournament was staged until the 1897.

== History ==
The original Buffalo Lawn Tennis Club was established in 1884 it had no permanent home of its own, the club held the Buffalo Lawn Tennis Tournament on the Summers Street Grounds from 1885. The organisation behind the first Buffalo Lawn Club influenced the development of the present Buffalo Tennis and Squash Club. It ran annually until 1897 then stopped.Tennis events returned to Buffalo in 1903 when The Park Country Club opened. In 1908 it held the Buffalo City Lawn Tennis Championship until 1920. In 1921 the Buffalo Tennis and Squash Club opened it then held the Buffalo Covered Court Championships (later the name changed to Buffalo Indoor Championships (also known as the Buffalo Mid Winter Indoor) until 1975.

== Finals ==
=== Men's singles ===
(incomplete roll)

Year	Wnner	Runner-up	Score
1885	(United States) Andrew L. Plummer	(United Kingdom) William Glyn	6–4, 6–3
1886	(United States) Ganson Depew	(United States) Edward E. Tanner	6–3, 6–2, 6–1
1887	(United States) Andrew L. Plummer (2)	(United States) Ganson Depew	4–6, 6–1, 6–4, 6–2
1888	(United States) Andrew L. Plummer (3)	(Canada) Laurence H. Baldwin	6–3, 6–4, 6–1
1889	(United States) Andrew L. Plummer (4)	(United States) F.H. Goodyear Jr.	6–2, 6–0, 6–1
1890	(United States) Edward E. Tanner	(United States) Andrew L. Plummer	6–4, 6–3, 6–2
1891	(United States) Edward E. Tanner (2)	(United States) Walter A. Wyckoff	6–2, 6–2, 6–4
1892	(United States) Edward E. Tanner (3)	(United States) S.R. Hammill	6–3, 6–4, 6–2
1893	(United States) Edward E. Tanner (4)	(United States) Lawrence D. Rumsey	6–1, 6–3, 6–2
1894	(United States) Edward E. Tanner (5)	(United States) Andrew L. Plummer	6–4, 6–4, 6–3
1895	(United States) Carr Neel	(United States) Edwin P. Fischer	6–2, 1–6, 0–6, 15–13, 6–4
1896	(United States) Edwin P. Fischer	(United States) Leo Ware	7–5, 3–6, 6–1, 10–8
1897	Tournament Abolished		

== See also ==
- Buffalo Tennis and Squash Club
