= Edward E. Tanner =

American tennis player

- Full name: Edward Everett Tanner
- Country (sports): USA
- Born: March 25, 1865 Buffalo, New York, United States
- Died: June 27, 1940 (aged 75) Buffalo, New York, United States
- Turned pro: 1886 (amateur)
- Retired: 1896

Singles
- Career record: 0–0
- Career titles: 9

Edward Everett Tanner (March 25, 1865 – June 27, 1940) was an American tennis player and later lawyer. He was singles champion at the 1890 Canadian Championships. He was active on the North American circuit from 1886 to 1896 and won 9 singles titles.

== Tennis career ==
Tanner was the dominant figure of the "Northern Circuit" during the early 1890s. His most significant achievement was capturing the 1890 Canadian National Championship in Toronto, where he defeated the prominent four-time champion Charles S. Hyman.

In addition to his national title, he was the preeminent player in Western New York, securing five consecutive titles at the Buffalo Open between 1890 and 1894.

He also won the Niagara International Championship in 1890, one of the most prestigious invitationals in North America at the time.

== Titles (9) ==
| Year | Tournament | Runner-up | Score |
|---|---|---|---|
| 1890 | Canadian Championships | (Canada) Charles S. Hyman | 6–3, 6–3, 6–1 |
| 1890 | Buffalo Open | (United States) Andrew L. Plummer | 6–4, 6–3, 6–2 |
| 1890 | Niagara International Championship | (Canada) Henry McKenzie | 6–4, 6–3, 6–2 |
| 1891 | Buffalo Open (2) | (United States) Walter A. Wyckoff | 6–2, 6–2, 6–4 |
| 1891 | Western New York Championship | (United States) F. H. Goodyear Jr. | 6–4, 6–1, 7–5 |
| 1892 | Buffalo Open (3) | (United States) S. R. Hammill | 6–3, 6–4, 6–2 |
| 1892 | Western New York Championship (2) | (United States) Andrew L. Plummer | 4–6, 6–3, 6–2, 6–4 |
| 1893 | Buffalo Open (4) | (United States) Lawrence D. Rumsey | 6–1, 6–3, 6–2 |
| 1894 | Buffalo Open (5) | (United States) Andrew L. Plummer | 6–4, 6–4, 6–3 |

== Personal ==
Tanner was born March 25, 1865. He was a 1886 graduate of the Williams College, and practiced law in Buffalo for over forty years. He was the son of Judge Alonzo Tanner and married Alice Shove in 1891, with whom he had one son; he was also the grandfather of the American author Edward Everett Tanner III. He died in Buffalo, New York on March 27, 1940.
