= Harry Hoffman Jr. =

- Country (sports): United States
- Born: January 14, 1937 (age 89)

Singles
- Career record: 184-104
- Career titles: 35

Grand Slam singles results
- US Open: 4R (1961)

Harry Hoffman Jr. is an American former tennis player of the 1950s and 1960s.

== Tennis career ==
Hoffman, a native of Philadelphia, is one of two sons born to tour player Harry Hoffman Sr.

He made the singles fourth round of the 1961 U.S. National Championships, where he fell to the third-seeded Roy Emerson.

Hoffmann won the Middle Atlantic Invitation Championships at Baltimore in 1957 defeating Reynaldo Garrido in the final in three straight sets and the same tournament again in 1959 defeating John Powless in the final, also in three straight sets.

One of his best wins was a marathon match against the then U.S. No. 2 Frank Froehling at the Pennsylvania Lawn Tennis Championships in 1963 which went to 64 games over two sets.
