= Walter Craig (sportsman) =

English cricketer (1846–1923)

Walter Reid Craig (29 December 1846 – 6 July 1923) was an English cricketer active in 1874 who played for Lancashire. He was born in Pilkington, Prestwich-cum-Oldham, Lancashire and died in Hangleton, Sussex. Craig was also a notable tennis player.

== Cricket career ==
Craig played cricket for Lancashire. He appeared in one first-class match as a righthanded batsman, scoring eight runs with a highest score of 7.

== Tennis career ==
Reid played his first lawn tennis tournament in 1881 at the Buxton Lawn Tennis Club Tournament. He won three singles titles including the Claremount Park Open (1886–1887) and Macclesfield Open (1886). He was also a semi finalist at the Derbyshire Championships in 1885 where he was defeated by James Dwight, and a semi finalist at the Northern Championships in 1886 where he was defeated by William Parkfield Wethered. He played his final singles tournament at the South of England Championships held in Brighton in 1889 where he reached the quarter finals before losing to Stuart Leslie Bathurst.
