= Claremount Park Open =

Defunct tennis tournament
- Founded: 1886; 139 years ago
- Abolished: 1889; 136 years ago
- Editions: 4
- Location: Blackpool, Lancashire, England
- Venue: Claremount Park
- Surface: Asphalt

The Claremount Park Open was a Victorian era open men's and women's tennis competition played on hard asphalt courts founded in 1886. The tournament was organised by the Claremount Park Lawn Tennis Club and held at Claremount Park Public Lawn Tennis Ground, Blackpool, Lancashire, England, until 1889 when it was discontinued.

== History ==
On 8 July 1886 the Claremount Park Lawn Tennis Club organised the Claremount Park Open tournament that was played at the Claremont Park Public Lawn Tennis Ground (a public park's event). The first edition of the tournament featured men's singles, men's doubles, and men's and women's pairs events. The tournament was held annually for only four editions when it was discontinued. The original lawn tennis club did not survive, however the Claremount Park public tennis courts are still used today and is an LTA registered venue.

== Finals ==
=== Men's Singles ===
Year	Winner	Runner-up	Score
1886	(England) Walter Reid Craig	(England) Charles Howard	6–4, 6–3.
1887	(England) Walter Reid Craig	(England) Owen Seaman	6–2, 3–6, 6–1.
1888	(England) Owen Seaman	(England) Walter Reid Craig	6–4, 4–6, 6–3.
1889	(United Kingdom) John Leyland Birley	(England) Walter Reid Craig	6–4, 4–6, 6–3.

=== Men's Doubles ===
(Incomplete roll)

Year	Winner	Runner-up	Score
1886	(United Kingdom) C. Howard (United Kingdom) H. Howard	(England) Owen Seaman (England) Mr. Worship	6–2, 6–3.

=== Mixed Doubles ===
(Incomplete roll)

Year	Winner	Runner-up	Score
1886	(England) Walter Reid Craig (United Kingdom) Miss Viener	(England) Mr. Howarth (England) Miss Moore	6–3, 4–6, 6–2.
