= County Wexford Open Championships =

Tournament information
- Founded: 1885; 140 years ago
- Location: Enniscorthy; Ireland
- Venue: Hillbrook Lawn Tennis Club
- Surface: Hard court

The County Wexford Open Championships was a grass then later hard court open tennis tournament first organised by the Wexford Lawn Tennis Club, Wexford, County Wexford, Ireland. The tournament was first established in 1885 as the County Wexford Tournament. The tournament was part of ILTF Circuit until 1967.

== History ==
In 1873 the Wexford Boat Club was founded. In 1883 tennis was introduced, and a tennis section was established. In August 1885 the Wexford club established the first County Wexford Lawn Tennis Club Tournament. In 1890 the Wexford Open tournament featured the County Wexford Championship event. The Wexford Lawn Tennis Club organised the county championships until 1955, then it was transferred to Hillbrook Lawn Tennis Club (f.1956) in Enniscorthy, The tournament was part of the worldwide ILTF Circuit until 1967, after which it became a more localised regional tennis event that is still staged today.
