= Toler Garvey =

Irish tennis player

- Full name: Toler Roberts Garvey
- Country (sports): Ireland
- Born: 11 February 1865; Parsonstown (modern Birr, County Offaly), Ireland
- Died: 16 April 1946 (aged 81); Birr, County Offaly, Ireland
- Turned pro: 1884 (amateur tour)
- Retired: 1896

Singles

Grand Slam singles results
- Wimbledon: SF (1886)

Toler Roberts Garvey (1865–1946) was an Irish tennis player who played at Wimbledon in 1886, where he beat William Taylor, before losing to Herbert Lawford in the semifinals. Garvey won several Irish tournaments including the King’s County and Ormonde Tournament three times (1886, 1894, 1896) (the 1890s was the most successful period in history for Irish tennis). Garvey was also a Justice of the Peace.
