= Staten Island Invitation =

Defunct tennis tournament
- Tour: ILTF Circuit (1913–1947)
- Founded: 1886; 140 years ago
- Abolished: 1922; 104 years ago
- Location: Staten Island, New York City, United States
- Venue: Staten Island Cricket and Baseball Club; Staten Island Athletic Club
- Surface: Grass

The Staten Island Invitation was a men's and women's grass court tennis tournament founded in 1886. It was first played at Staten Island Cricket and Baseball Club, Livingston, Staten Island, New York City, United States. The tournament was staged until 1922 when it was abolished.

== History ==
In 1886 the Staten Island Invitation tennis tournament was established. The tournament was held first at the Staten Island Cricket and Baseball Club (f.1872), and occasionally held at the Staten Island Athletic Club until the 1910s when the singles events was discontinued. In 1920 the event was revived and moved permanently to the Staten Island Athletic Club until 1922 when it was discontinued.
