= Delaware Tennis Club Tournament =

Defunct tennis tournament
- Founded: 1886; 139 years ago
- Abolished: 1886; 139 years ago
- Location: Wilmington, Delaware, United States
- Venue: Delaware Tennis Club
- Surface: Grass

The Delaware Tennis Club Tournament was a 19th-century American tennis competition held only one time in September 1886. The event was played at the Delaware Tennis Club, Wilmington, Delaware, United States and was discontinued.

== History ==
In 1885 the Delaware Field Club was founded. The club staged the Delaware Tennis Club Tournament in September 1886 the event was played on grass courts. The winner of the men's event was Charles Belmont Davis who defeated Gustavus Remak Jr. in four sets.

== Finals ==
=== Men's singles ===
(Incomplete roll)

Year	Champions	Runners-up	Score
1886	(United States) Charles Belmont Davis	(United States) Gustavus Remak jr	6–4, 6–4, 3–6, 6–2.
