= Harrisburg Open Championships =

Defunct tennis tournament
- Tour: ILTF Circuit
- Founded: 1886; 139 years ago
- Abolished: 1970; 55 years ago
- Location: Harrisburg, Pennsylvania, United States
- Surface: Grass

The Harrisburg Open Championships was a men's and women's grass court tennis tournament founded in 1886 as the Harrisburg Lawn Tennis Tournament. It was first organised by Harrisburg Outdoor Club, and played at the Harrisburg, Pennsylvania, United States through till 1970 when it was discontinued.

== History ==
In September 1886 the Harrisburg Outdoor Club organised the first Harrisburg Lawn Tennis Tournament. Following World War Two the tournament was re-branded as the Harrisburg Open Championships. The event continued to be held annually until 1970 when it was discontinued.

== Finals ==
=== Men's singles ===
(Incomplete roll)

Year	Champions	Runners-up	Score
1886	(United States) Frank Beecher Wiestling	(United States) George Reilly Jr.	6–3, 6–2.
1887	(United States) Clarence Munroe Clark	(United States) Frank Beecher Wiestling	6–4, 6–4.
1888	(United States) Joseph Sill Clark Sr.	(United States) Frank Beecher Wiestling	6–3, 3–6, 6–3.
1970	(United States) Bell Loercher	(United States) Ed Dailey	6–1, 6–4.

=== Mixed doubles ===
(Incomplete roll)

Year	Champions	Runners-up	Score
1886	(United States) George E. Etter (United States) Miss. Wiestling	?	won.
