= Merion Cricket Club Amateur Tennis Tournament =

Defunct tennis tournament
- Tour: USNLTA Circuit
- Founded: 1886; 139 years ago
- Abolished: 1901; 124 years ago
- Location: Ardmore, Pennsylvania, United States
- Venue: Merion Cricket Club
- Surface: Grass

The Merion Cricket Club Amateur Tennis Tournament was a combined men's and women's grass court tennis tournament founded in 1886. The tournament was organised by the Merion Cricket Club and was staged annually until 1901 when it was discontinued.

== History ==
In 1886 the Merion Cricket Club Amateur Tournament was established at the Merion Cricket Club in Ardmore, Pennsylvania, United States. In 1887 a women's event was added to the schedule the final was unfinished and both Lydia Wood and Miss. Lycett shared the title. In 1892 the club moved to is current location in Haverford, PA. This event was the precursor tournament, to the Pennsylvania State Lawn Tennis Championships that began in 1894 and it continued to host the tournament for the next eight decades.

== Finals ==
=== Men's singles ===
(Incomplete roll)

Year	Winner	Runner-up	Score
1886	(United States) William Linton Landreth	(United States) Frederick Winslow Taylor	6–4, 3–6, 6–3
1887	(United States) Frederick Winslow Taylor	(United States) William Linton Landreth	7–5, 8–6
1890	(United States) Rodmond Vernon Beach	(United States) Benjamin C. Allen	2–6, 8–6, 6–3
1901	(United States) Kane Green	(United States) Marmaduke Smith	6–4, 2–6, 6–4.

=== Women's singles ===
(Incomplete roll)

Year	Winner	Runner-up	Score
1887	(United States) Lydia Wood	(United States) Miss. Lycett	2–6, unfinished.
1888	(United States) Bertha Townsend	(United States) Lydia Wood	6–3, 6–3.
