= Minnesota Open =

Tournament information
- Founded: 1902
- Location: Minnesota; Minneapolis; United States
- Surface: Hard
- Website: Minnesota Open

The Minnesota Open previously known as the Minnesota State Championships is an open men's and women's tennis competition founded in 1902 as the Championship of the Minnesota State Tennis Association. The tournament was first played at the St. Paul Lawn Tennis Club, Saint Paul, Minnesota, United States and ran as part of the ILTF Circuit until 1971.

== History ==
In 1886 the first unofficial Minnesota State Championships was staged by the Minnesota Lawn Tennis Club. The event was billed as the Championship of Minnesota, a men's-only event that was won by Lucius Pond Ordway. The tournament was not held again.

In 1888 North Western Lawn Tennis Association was formed. The NWLTA was responsible for administering all tennis clubs in the states of Minnesota, Montana, North Dakota, and South Dakota. In 1901 the Minnesota State Tennis Association was formed.

In 1902 the first official Minnesota State Championship was played at the Minnesota Lawn Tennis Club in Saint Paul, Minnesota. The tournament was part of North Western Lawn Tennis Association circuit, which itself was part of the USNLTA Circuit. From 1925 the tournament was open to foreign players and became part of the ILTF Circuit.

The championships were held at various locations throughout Minnesota including Duluth, Minneapolis, Saint Paul, and White Bear Lake. Winners of the men's singles title include John F. Hennessey, he was a member of the St. Paul Tennis Club, Gardnar Mulloy, and Wendell Clarence Ottum, who won the title eight times (1958, 1960–1865, 1967).

Winners of women's singles title included Genevieve Wales, Gwendolyn Rees, Marguerite Davis (St, Paul LTC), Elizabeth Deike, and Muriel Magnusson. The championships continue to be staged as the Minnesota Open.
