= Colwyn Bay Open =

Tennis tournament in Wales

Defunct tennis tournament
- Tour: ILTF Circuit
- Founded: 1886; 139 years ago
- Abolished: 1959; 66 years ago
- Location: Colwyn Bay, Denbighshire, Wales
- Venue: Pwyllycrochan Park; Colwyn Bay LTC; Eirias Park

The Colwyn Bay Open and later known as the Colwyn Bay Open Hard Court Tennis Tournament was men's and women's grass court tennis tournament founded in 1886 as the Colwyn Bay Open Lawn Tennis Tournament. It was first played on Pwyllycrochan Park Estate, Colwyn Bay, Denbighshire, Wales. The tournament was staged annually until 1930 when it was discontinued. Following World War II the tournament was revived in 1949 and continued till 1959 when it was abolished.

== History ==
In August 1886 the Colwyn Bay Open Lawn Tennis Tournament was established. The early editions were played on the Pwllycrochan Estate on the former grounds of a mansion house that was turned into a hotel in 1866 called the Pwllycrochan Hotel. Play at the hotel was conducted on a combination of hard clay and grass tennis courts in the grounds of the hotel. In 1890 the tournament was moved to the newly opened Colwyn Bay Lawn Club grounds at Princes Drive. After tournament had moved the event was played on grass courts.

In 1919 the club was looking for a new venue as it had outgrown its facilities. In 1921 the local council purchased 50 acres of land at Eirias Park. The first 27 acres were bought by the council on April 12, 1921, and the remainder in 1929. Colwyn Bay Tennis club were granted a new ground formally opened by Frederick Smith, 1st Baron Colwyn in 1921 and moved there. By 1933 the facilities had been expanded to include eight clay courts.

The tournament continued to be staged until 1939 when it was discontinued due to World War II. In 1949 the tournament resumed and also featured a junior open event for the first time. In 1959 the senior event was discontinued as part of the ILTF Circuit. However the junior event did carry on until as late as 1986.

In 2003 the tennis grounds at Eirias Park were renamed as the James Alexander Barr Tennis Centre. By this time the clay courts had been replaced by four outdoor hard courts and included 2 indoor hard tennis courts.
