= Rockaway Hunting Club Invitation =

Defunct tennis tournament
- Founded: 1886; 139 years ago
- Abolished: 1966; 59 years ago
- Location: Lawrence, Nassau County, New York, United States
- Venue: Rockaway Hunting Club
- Surface: Grass

The Rockaway Hunting Club Invitation was an early men's tennis tournament founded in 1886 as the Rockaway Hunting Club Lawn Tennis Tournament and played at Lawrence, Nassau County, New York, United States until 1966.

== History ==
In 1878 the Rockaway Hunting Club was founded in Bayswater, New York as a country club. In 1884 it moved to Lawrence, Nassau County, New York. In 1886 the club staged an open men's tennis event called the Rockaway Hunting Club Lawn Tennis Tournament. The first tournament was won by Henry Warner Slocum who would go on to win the event two more times. The event for the first forty years just featured a permanent men's singles event, In 1888 a women's invitational singles was added to the schedule but it was not held every year. However a double's men's event was added and In 1940 the women's invitational event became a regular event The tournament ran annually till 1966 when it was discontinued.
