= Dundrum Open =

Defunct tennis tournament
- Founded: 1881; 145 years ago
- Abolished: 1888; 138 years ago
- Location: Dundrum, Dublin, Ireland
- Venue: Dundrum Lawn Tennis Club
- Surface: Grass

The Dundrum Open also known as the Dundrum Open Lawn Tennis Tournament was a combined men's and women's grass court tennis tournament founded in 1881 as the Dundrum Tournament. The tournament was organised by the Dundrum Lawn Tennis Club and played at Dundrum, Dublin, Ireland annually until 1887 when it was discontinued.

== History ==
In 1881 the first Dundrum Tournament was held in Dundrum, Dublin, Ireland The tournament was organised by the Dundrum Lawn Tennis Club and played at Dundrum, Dublin, Ireland] annually until 1887 when it was discontinued.

== Finals ==
=== Men's singles ===
(Incomplete roll)

Year	Champion	Runner-up	Score
1881	(Ireland) Eyre Chatterton	(Ireland) John Jameson Cairnes	6–0, 6–2, 6–2
1885	(Ireland) Willoughby Hamilton	(Ireland) William Drummond Hamilton	6–3, 4–6, 6–3, 8–6
1886	(Ireland) William Drummond Hamilton	(Ireland) Arthur Henry Gore Ashe	6–1, 6–4, 6–3
