= Championships of the Midland Counties =

Defunct tennis tournament
- Founded: 1883
- Abolished: 1928
- Location: Parsonstown; King’s County; Ireland
- Surface: Outdoor (Grass)

The Championships of the Midland Counties was an early combined grass court tennis tournament held in Parsonstown, King’s County, Ireland. First founded in 1883 as King’s County & Ormonde Tournament through to 1928.

== History ==
The King’s County and Ormonde Tournament was a brief pre-open era tennis tournament played on outdoor grass courts in Parsonstown, King’s County, Ireland there were nine editions of this event.

== Past tournaments ==
Incomplete list of tournaments included:

=== Men's singles ===
Year	Champion	Runner up	Score
1883	(United Kingdom of Great Britain and Ireland) Eyre Chatterton	(United Kingdom of Great Britain and Ireland) P. Knox	6-3 6-4 6-2
1884 (Note: Browne had a walkover defending champion Chatterton in the challenge round)	(United Kingdom of Great Britain and Ireland) Ernest Browne	(United Kingdom of Great Britain and Ireland) Eyre Chatterton	2-1 ret.
1885 (Note: defending champion retained title in the challenge round)	(United Kingdom of Great Britain and Ireland) A.O. Jennings	(United Kingdom of Great Britain and Ireland) Toler Garvey	6-4 6-4 4-6 8-6
1886 (Note: 1886 edition there was no challenge round)	(United Kingdom of Great Britain and Ireland) Toler Garvey	(United Kingdom of Great Britain and Ireland) Arthur de Courcy Wilson	w.o
1887 (Note: 1887 edition challenge round re-instated)	(United Kingdom of Great Britain and Ireland) Grainger Chaytor	(United Kingdom of Great Britain and Ireland) George Garvey	2 sets to 1
1891 (Note: 1891 edition there was a challenge round)	(United Kingdom of Great Britain and Ireland) Herbert Craig	(United Kingdom of Great Britain and Ireland) John Head	6-2 6-2 6-2
1892 (Note: 1892 edition there was a walk over in the challenge round)	(United Kingdom of Great Britain and Ireland) Manliffe Goodbody	(United Kingdom of Great Britain and Ireland) Hume Riversadale Jones	6-2 6-3 15-13
1894	(United Kingdom of Great Britain and Ireland) Toler Garvey	(United Kingdom of Great Britain and Ireland) W. R. Clark	4-6 6-1 6-0 6-4
1896	(United Kingdom of Great Britain and Ireland) Toler Garvey	(United Kingdom of Great Britain and Ireland) Alexander Grant-Foulerton	6-1 6-2 6-4

== Sources ==
- Archives, Tennis (2017). "King's County and Ormonde Tournament, 1883-1896". www.tennisarchives.com.
