= Somerville Championship =

Somerville Tennis Tournament Somerville Championship

Defunct tennis tournament
- Tour: USNLTA Circuit
- Founded: 1886; 139 years ago
- Abolished: 1897; 128 years ago
- Location: Somerville, Massachusetts, United States
- Venue: Somerville Tennis Club
- Surface: Grass

The Somerville Championship also known as the Tennis Championship of Somerville was a combined men's and women's grass court tennis tournament founded in 1886 as the Somerville Tennis Tournament. The tournament was organised by the Somerville Tennis Association and was played Somerville Tennis Club at their ground in Somerville, Massachusetts, United States annually until 1897 when it was discontinued.

== History ==
In 1884 the Somerville Tennis Tournament was established by the Somerville Tennis Association and was played Somerville Tennis Club at their ground in Somerville, Massachusetts, United States. The event was part of the regular season of tournaments of the Somerville Tennis Association. By 1889 the association consisted of 100 players the president was Edward Falcombe Woods and vice-president Harry H. Wiggin. In 1897 the event was a Round-robin tournament Beals Wright played at the tournament he ended up runner up. The championships ran until 1897 when it was abolished.

== Finals ==
=== Men's singles ===
(Incomplete roll)

| Year | Champion | Runner-up | Score |
|---|---|---|---|
| 1886 | (United States) Edward Falcombe Woods | (United States) Robert Lincoln | 6–2, 6–2 |
| 1891 | (United States) George Stevens | (United States) F. Boulton | 6–0, 6–4 |
| 1895 | (United States) Mr. Dalgety | (United States) F. Boulton | 6–0, 6–4 |
| 1896 | (United States) Arthur Flitner | (United States) Mr. Dunmore | 6–0, 6–3, 6–3 |
| 1897 | (United States) J. H. Chase | (United States) Beals Wright | RR. |

=== Men's doubles ===
(Incomplete roll)

| Year | Champions | Runner-up | Score |
|---|---|---|---|
| 1886 | (United States) William Dunbar Hobart (United States) Alfred Knox Hemingway | (United States) Mr. Crane (United States) Edward Falcombe Woods | 6–2, 6–3. |
| 1891 | (United States) George H. Dickerman (United States) Gerald Mallory Smith | (United States) Mr. Crane (United States) Edward Falcombe Woods | 6–3, 4–6, 6–3. |

=== Mixed doubles ===
(Incomplete roll)

| Year | Champions | Runner-up | Score |
|---|---|---|---|
| 1886 | (United States) Edward Falcombe Woods (United States) Miss. Jeanie Lowe | (United States) Charles Davis (United States) Miss. Kate Bingham | 6–2, 6–3. |
| 1891 | (United States) Alexander C. Baldwin (United States) Miss. Claire Baldwin | (United States) George H. Dickerman (United States) Miss. Roslyn Ahern | 6–4, 6–4. |
