= County Cavan Championships =

Tennis tournament in Ireland

Defunct tennis tournament
- Tour: ILTF Circuit
- Founded: 1885; 140 years ago
- Abolished: 1955; 70 years ago
- Location: Cavan, Ireland
- Venue: County Cavan Lawn Tennis Club
- Surface: Grass

The County Cavan Championships was a men's and women's grass court tennis tournament founded in 1885 as the County Cavan Lawn Tennis Tournament. The tournament was organised by the County Cavan Lawn Tennis Club, and played at Cavan, Ireland. It was played annually until 1955.

== History ==
The County Cavan Championships was a men's and women's grass court tennis tournament founded in 1885 as the County Cavan Lawn Tennis Tournament. It was held annually until at least the 1920s when it was renamed as the County Cavan Championships. The tournament was part of the pre-open era senior tennis circuit till at least the 1950s. The championships have however still survived today as a Tennis Ireland tournament where they are known as the Cavan Senior Open.

== Venue ==
The tennis club was officially incorporated with a permanent home in Cavan Town in 1888. The clubs facilities today include five tennis courts (3 artificial grass courts, 2 hard rubber coated courts and 2 padel courts. All Courts are floodlit.

== Finals ==
=== Men's singles ===
(Incomplete list)

County Cavan Lawn Tennis Tournament
Year	Winners	Runners-up	Score
1886 *	(Ireland) William Percy French	(Ireland) Lord Newtonbutler	6–4, 6–2
1887 *	(Ireland) William Percy French	(Ireland) J.S.F. Hearn	8–6 6–2 1–6 6–2
1890 *	(Ireland) Manliffe Francis Goodbody	(Ireland) Walter Herbert Boyd	4–6, 6–4, 6–3 6–1
1895*	(Ireland) George Ball-Greene	(Ireland) Frank Stoker	2–6, 6–3, 3–6, 6–3
County Cavan Championships
1929	(Republic of Ireland) A. Harman	(Republic of Ireland) Vesey R. Knox	6–4, 7–9, 6–3, 6–1
1932	(Republic of Ireland) George McVeagh	(Republic of Ireland) Alfred E. Fannin	2–6, 6–3, 3–6, 6–3
1948	(Republic of Ireland) C. An Odlum	(Republic of Ireland) W A. Gordon	4–6, 6–4, 6–3, 6–4
1951	(Republic of Ireland) Cyril Kemp	(Southern Rhodesia) Don Black	6–3, 6–1, 2–6, 6–4
1954	(Republic of Ireland) D. D. Pratt	(Republic of Ireland) C. Anderson	6–2, 6–2, 6–2

=== Women's singles ===
(Incomplete list)

County Cavan Lawn Tennis Tournament
Year	Winners	Runners-up	Score
1889	(Ireland) M.A. Kinahan	(Ireland)	6–0, 6–2
1893	(United Kingdom) Jane Corder	(Ireland) M.A. Kinahan	6–2, 6–0
1895	(Ireland) Ruth Dyas	(Ireland) Jane Corder	6–4, 1–6, 6–4
County Cavan Championships
1923	(Republic of Ireland) Phoebe Blair-White	(Republic of Ireland) Freda Pearson	6–3, 2–6, 6–3
1931	(Republic of Ireland) Phyllis Wallis	(Republic of Ireland) Hilda Wallis	6–4, 6–4
1948	(Republic of Ireland) Mrs. P. O’Brien	(Republic of Ireland) Miss. P. Lanigan	6–3, 6–0
1954	(Republic of Ireland) Miss A. K. Clarke	(Republic of Ireland) Mrs. R. A. Bain	5–7, 6–2, 7–5
