= Manitoba Championships =

Defunct tennis tournament
- Tour: CLTA Circuit (1890-1912); ILTF Circuit (1913-1947)
- Founded: 1885; 141 years ago
- Abolished: 1947; 79 years ago
- Location: Winnipeg, Manitoba, Canada
- Venue: Winnipeg Lawn Tennis Club
- Surface: Grass (1885-1905); Clay (1906-1947)

The Manitoba Championships, also known as the Province of Manitoba Championships was a men's and women's grass court tennis tournament founded in 1885 as the Manitoba and Northwest Territories Championships. It was first played at Winnipeg Lawn Tennis Club in Winnipeg, Manitoba, Canada. The championships were part of the ILTF Circuit.

The tournament was also informally known as the Manitoba Open Championships.

== History ==
In 1882 the Winnipeg Lawn Tennis Club was founded. In 1885 the club moved its location to the Manitoba College, where three new grass courts were built. The club then staged the first Manitoba Championships with the winner of the men's singles title going to British-born player A. H. Dickens (a nephew of Sir Charles Dickens).

The tournament was not held between 1915 and 1918 due to World War I. In August 1920 the event was held jointly with the Canadian International Championships with the victors assuming both titles: 'Champion of Canada and Champion of Manitoba'. The event was cancelled in 1942 and did not resume until 1946. The championships were discontinued in 1947 and thereafter due to an combination of issues with maintenance and lack of funds due to falling membership levels. The venue did not host another senior tour level event until 1998 when it hosted the Manitoba Ladies Challenger Tournament.

The event was revived in the modern era as the Manitoba Clay Court Championships, and is now held at the Taylor Lawn Tennis Club, Winnipeg.

== Event names ==
- Manitoba & Northwest Territories Championships (1885-1890).
- Manitoba & Northwestern Championships (1891-1899)
- Province of Manitoba Championships (1900-1921).
- Manitoba Lawn Tennis Championships (1922-1930).
- Manitoba Championships (1931-1947).
