= Galashiels Tournament =

Tournament information
- Location: Galashiels, Selkirkshire, Scotland
- Established: 1920
- Course: Galashiels Golf Club
- Final year: 1920

Final champion
- James Braid

Location in Scotland

The Galashiels Tournament was a professional golf tournament played at Galashiels Golf Club near Galashiels, Scotland on 19 and 20 May 1920. It was first of three important tournaments held in Scotland on successive weeks, being followed by the Glasgow Herald Tournament from 24 to 27 May and the McVitie & Price Tournament on 2 and 3 June. Total prize money was £300.

Jimmy McDowall led after the first day with a total of 151 after rounds of 76 and 75. James Braid was a stroke behind with Charles Johns, Ted Ray and Harry Vardon a further 5 shots back. McDowall had a poor third round of 83 to leave Braid, scoring 76, leading by 6 from McDowall and Vardon after three rounds. Braid broke the course record with a final round of 70 to give him a comfortable 9 stroke win over Vardon, with Ray two strokes further behind. Braid took the £75 first prize while Vardon earned £50 for finishing second.

== Winners ==
Year	Winners	Country	Venue	Score	Margin of victory	Runner-up	Winner's share (£)	Ref
1920	James Braid	Scotland	Galashiels Golf Club	298	9 strokes	(Jersey) Harry Vardon	75	
