= Seventh Regiment Championship =

Defunct tennis tournament
- Founded: 1885
- Abolished: 1960
- Location: Manhattan, New York City, NY, United States
- Venue: Seventh Regiment Armory
- Surface: Wood(indoor)

The Seventh Regiment Championship also known as the Seventh Regiment Indoor Championship was a tennis tournament first established in 1885 at Manhattan, New York City, United States and played on indoor hard courts at the Seventh Regiment Armory. It was part of the worldwide lawn tennis circuit until 1960 when the event was known as the Seventh Regiment Invitation.

== History ==
The Seventh Regiment Championship was a tennis tournament first established in 1885 at Manhattan, NYC, New York State, United States and played on indoor hard wood courts. It was part of the worldwide lawn tennis circuit until 1960 when the event was known as the Seventh Regiment Invitation.

== Finals ==
=== Men's Singles ===
(Incomplete roll)

| Year | Champions | Runners-up | Score |
|---|---|---|---|
| 1885 | (United States) Henry Graff Trevor | ? | def. |
| 1886 | (United States) Valentine Gill Hall | (United States) Henry Graff Trevor | 6–3,3–6, 6–4, 6–2. |
| 1908 | (United States) William Cragin Jr. | (United States) Calhoun C. Cragin | 6–4, 10–8, 3–6, 6–3. |
| 1920 | (United States) Frank T. Anderson | (United States) Fred Anderson | 7–5, 6–1, 6–2. |
| 1921 | (United States) Fred Anderson | (United States) Frank T. Anderson | 11–9, 6–8, 6–3, 6–4. |
| 1928 | (United States) Herbert Bowman | (United States) Fred Anderson | 6–4, 6–2, 5–7, 6–3. |
| 1930 | (United States) Herbert Bowman (2) | (United States) Percy Rockafellow | 6–4, 8–6, 7–5. |
| 1943 | (United States) Herbert Bowman (3) | (United States) Edward E. Jenkins Jr. | 3–0 sets. |
| 1960 | (United States) Paul Cranis | (United States) Allen Morris | 6–4, 6–2. |

=== Women's Singles ===
(Incomplete roll)

| Year | Champions | Runners-up | Score |
|---|---|---|---|
| 1929 | (United States) Marie Wagner | (United States) Alice Francis | 6–3, 4–6, 8–6. |
