= Bar Harbor Club Open =

Defunct tennis tournament
- Tour: ILTF Circuit (1913–1968)
- Founded: 1886; 139 years ago
- Abolished: 1972; 53 years ago
- Location: Bar Harbor, Maine, United States.
- Venue: Bar Harbor Lawn Tennis Club (1886–1914); Bar Harbor Swimming Club Courts (1926–30); Bar Harbor Club (1930–1972)
- Surface: Clay/Grass

The Bar Harbor Club Open was a men's and women's tennis tournament founded in 1886 as the Bar Harbor Open. In 1899 it was rebranded as the Bar Harbor Invitation It was first organised by the Bar Harbor Lawn Tennis Club, Bar Harbor, Maine, United States. The first tournament ran until 1914 then was discontinued. In 1926 the tournament was revived and in 1929 the event was moved to the new held at the Bar Harbor Club that ran until 1972.

== History ==
The Bar Harbor Open tournament was a grass court tennis event established in 1886 by the Bar Harbor Lawn Tennis Club, Bar Harbor, Maine, United States. Competitors in the men's tournament played for the Molesley Hall Challenge Cup. In 1903 the new Bar Harbor Swimming Club was constructed and the tournament was moved to the clay tennis courts in the grounds of the club. The first tournament was held annually until 1914 when it was discontinued. In 1926 a second tournament was revived, that moved to the new Bar Harbor Club built by J. P. Morgan to replace the Bar Harbor Swimming Club in 1930. The new venue consisted of nine tennis courts, that event continued to be held through until 1972 when it was discontinued.

== Notes ==
The Bar Harbor Swimming Club and later Bar Harbor Club also staged the Maine State Championships. In the 1920s also known as the International Maritime and Maine State Championships.
