= Middle Atlantic Invitation =

Baltimore Invitation Middle Atlantic Invitation

Defunct tennis tournament
- Tour: ILTF Circuit
- Founded: 1886; 140 years ago
- Abolished: 1970; 56 years ago
- Location: Baltimore, Maryland, United States
- Venue: Various
- Surface: Grass

The Middle Atlantic Invitation was a men's and women's grass court tennis tournament founded in 1886 as the Baltimore Invitation. It was first organised by Baltimore Cricket Club (f. 1874), and played at the Baltimore, Maryland, United States through till 1969 when it was discontinued.

== History ==
In October 1886 the Baltimore Cricket Club organised the first Baltimore Invitation Lawn Tennis Tournament. Following World War Two the tournament was re-branded as the Middle Atlantic Invitation. In 1898 the tournament was moved to Baltimore Country Club. The event continued to be held annually until 1969 when it was discontinued.

== Finals ==
=== Men's singles ===
(Incomplete roll)

Year	Champions	Runners-up	Score
1886	(United States) Leigh Bonsal	(United States) Charles Belmont Davis	6–3, 6–2, 6–4.
1887	(United States) Alexander Post	(United States) Charles Laurie McCawley	6–4, 3–6, 6–2, 6–5.
1888	(United States) Alexander Post	(United States) Leigh Bonsal	6–2, 6–2, 6–1.
1909	(United States) Jack Colston	(United States) Basil Wagner	2–6, 6–1, 6–2, 5–7, 6–2.
1890	(United States) Marmaduke Smith	(United States) Fred Hovey	6–4, 6–2, 3–6, 1–6, 6–4.
1900	(United States) Harry F. Allen	(United States) Malcolm Greene Chace	6–2, 2–6, 6–2.
1905	(Australia) Edward Dewhurst	(United States) William Clothier	6–4, 1–6, 6–2, 6–2.
1905	(United States) William Clothier	(Australia) Edward Dewhurst	6–3, 7–5, 6–4.
1927	(Spain) Manuel Alonso Areizaga	(United States) Carl Fischer	6–4, 8–6, 6–4.
1957	(United States) Harry Hoffman Jr.	(Cuba) Reynaldo Garrido	6–2, 6–3, 6–3.
1963	(United States) Frank Froehling III	(Chile) Patricio Rodríguez	6–2 6–3 6–3.
1964	(United States) Dennis Ralston	(United States) Frank Froehling III	7–5, 15–13, 6–3.
1965	(Australia) Fred Stolle	(New Zealand) Lew Gerrard	6–3, 6–3, 6–4.
1966	(United Kingdom) Mark Cox	(United States) Jim McManus	6–3 6–2 6–3.
1968	(South Africa) Bob Hewitt	(Australia) Colin Stubs	6–1, 6–4.
↓ Open era ↓
1969	(United States) Bobby Johnson Jr.	(United States) Ed Dailey	7–5, 6–4.

=== Women's singles ===
(Incomplete roll)

Year	Champions	Runners-up	Score
1936	(United States) Alice Marble	(United States) Pauline Betz	4–6, 6–4, 6–0.
1966	(United Kingdom) Virginia Wade	(United States) Peaches Bartkowicz	6–1, 6–4.
