= Buffalo Tennis and Squash Club =

- U.S. National Register of Historic Places
- U.S. Historic district – Contributing property
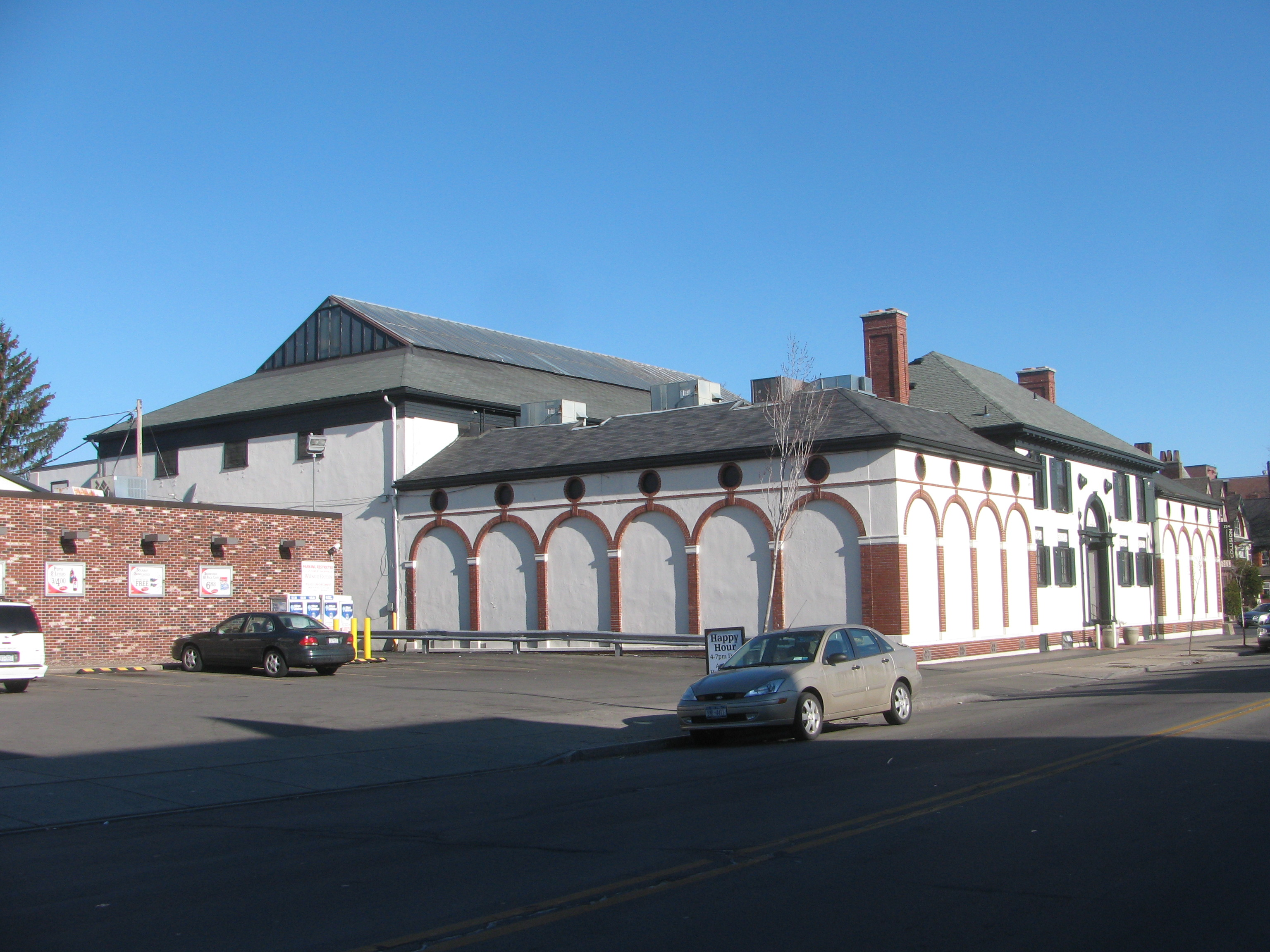
- Buffalo Tennis and Squash Club, April 2009

- Location within New York Location within the United States
- Location: 314 Elmwood Ave., Buffalo, New York
- Coordinates: 42°54′19″N 78°52′38″W
- Area: 1 acre (0.40 ha)
- Built: 1915-1916, 1926, 1929, 1968
- Architect: Lansing, Bley & Lyman; Bley & Lyman; Lyman & Assoc.
- Architectural style: Classical Revival
- NRHP reference No.: 08001141
- Added to NRHP: December 05, 2008

Buffalo Tennis and Squash Club is a historic clubhouse building in Buffalo in Erie County, New York. It was built in 1915–1916 and is a 2 1/2-story, Classical Revival–style building with a hipped roof. It is constructed of hollow tile and is sheathed in stucco with brick quoins. The original building was enlarged with the addition of two doubles squash courts in 1929. A second tennis court was added in 1968.

It was listed on the National Register of Historic Places in 2008. It is located in the Elmwood Historic District–West.
