= Owen Seaman =

British writer, journalist and poet

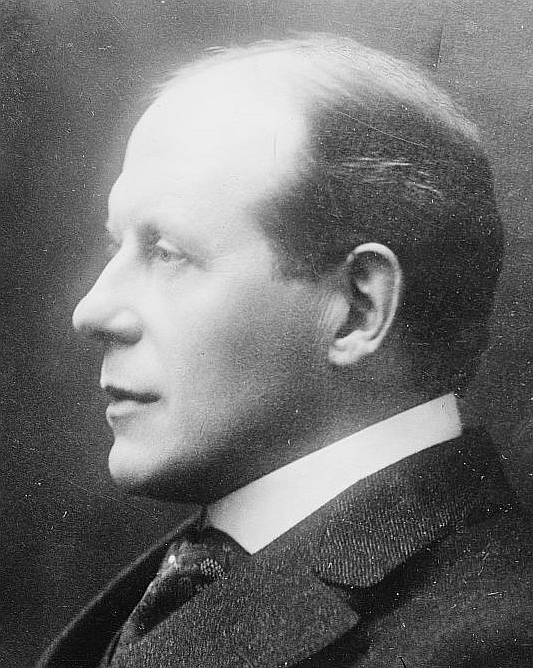
Sir Owen Seaman, Bt.

Sir Owen Seaman, 1st Baronet (18 September 1861 – 2 February 1936) was a British writer, journalist and poet. He is best known as editor of Punch, from 1906 to 1932.

== Biography ==
Born in Shrewsbury, he was the only son of William Mantle Seaman and Sarah Ann Balls. He distinguished himself academically both at Shrewsbury School and later Clare College, Cambridge. Following this, he worked as a schoolmaster at Rossall School (1884) and Magdalen College School, Oxford (1887–8), professor of literature at Durham College of Science, Newcastle upon Tyne (1890–1903), and became a barrister of the Inner Temple in 1897.

Seaman's first successful submission to the satirical and humorous magazine Punch was "Rhyme of the Kipperling", an 1894 parody of Rudyard Kipling. The same year he published a full volume of parodies entitled Horace at Cambridge. After several years of submitting work which showed "a remarkable gift for the composition of light verse," he was invited to join the staff in 1897, becoming assistant editor in 1902 and finally editor in 1906. It was during his tenure there that A. A. Milne, author of the Winnie-the-Pooh stories, worked as his assistant; it is thought that Seaman's dour disposition may have been the inspiration behind the gloomy character of Eeyore.

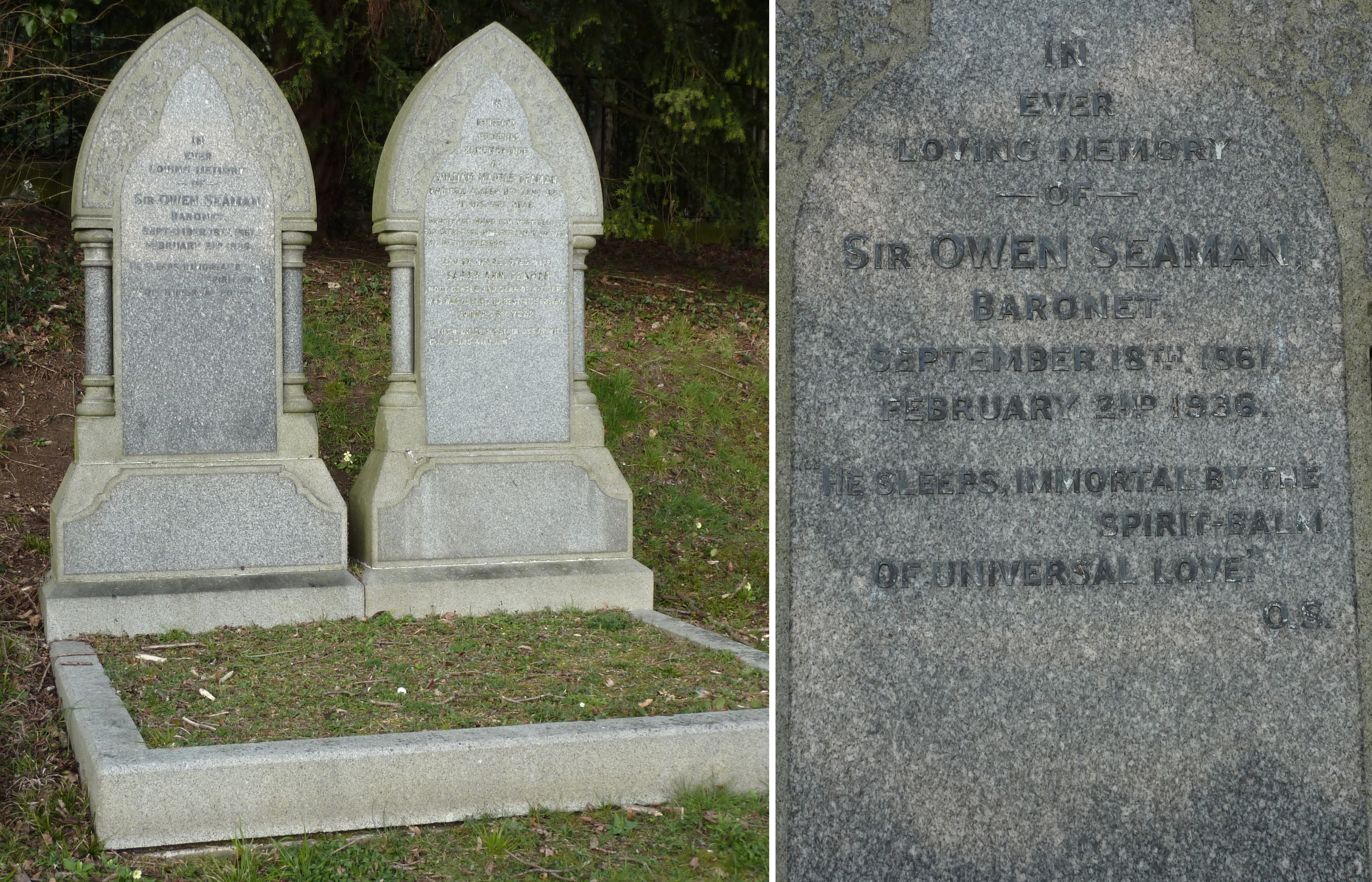
Seaman's grave at Putney Vale Cemetery, London, in 2015

In 1914 he was knighted, more likely for his creativity than for his patriotism, which saw fuller bloom in the course of World War I. During the war, he wrote "number of verses of a somewhat mindless, patriotic kind, reflecting the optimism and devotion to his native land rather than the stirrings of poetic genius," as anthologist John M. Munro put it. In 1915, he published War Time, a book of poetry that Munro described as "a mixture of satiric verse and patriotic doggerel." Nevertheless, in 1933, he was created a baronet, of Bouverie Street in the City of London. Sir Owen never married, and died in 1936 aged 74. He is buried in Putney Vale Cemetery; his epitaph reads "He sleeps, immortal by the spirit – Balm of universal love."

Baronetage of the United Kingdom
New creation	Baronet (of Bouverie Street); 1933–1936	Extinct
