= Macclesfield Open =

Defunct tennis tournament
- Tour: LTA Circuit (1888-1912) ILTF Circuit (1913-67)
- Founded: 1885; 140 years ago
- Abolished: 1967; 58 years ago
- Location: Macclesfield, Cheshire, England
- Venue: West Park/South Park
- Surface: Grass

The Macclesfield Open also known as the South Park Tournament was a combined men's and women's grass court tennis tournament founded in 1881 as the Macclesfield Open Lawn Tennis Tournament. The tournament was organised by the Macclesfield Lawn Tennis Club and played at Macclesfield, Cheshire, England annually until 1967 when it was discontinued.

== History ==
In 1881 the first Macclesfield Open Lawn Tennis Tournament was held in Macclesfield, Cheshire, England in 1885, The tournament was organised by the Macclesfield Lawn Tennis Club and played at West Park annually until the early 1910s. The tournament was then moved to South Park, Macclesfield in 1920. By 1925 it was also known as the South Park Tournament. The event was stopped two times during world war one and world war two. The tournament was staged annually until 1967 just before open era when it was dropped from the LTA schedule of events.
