= 1887 men's tennis season =

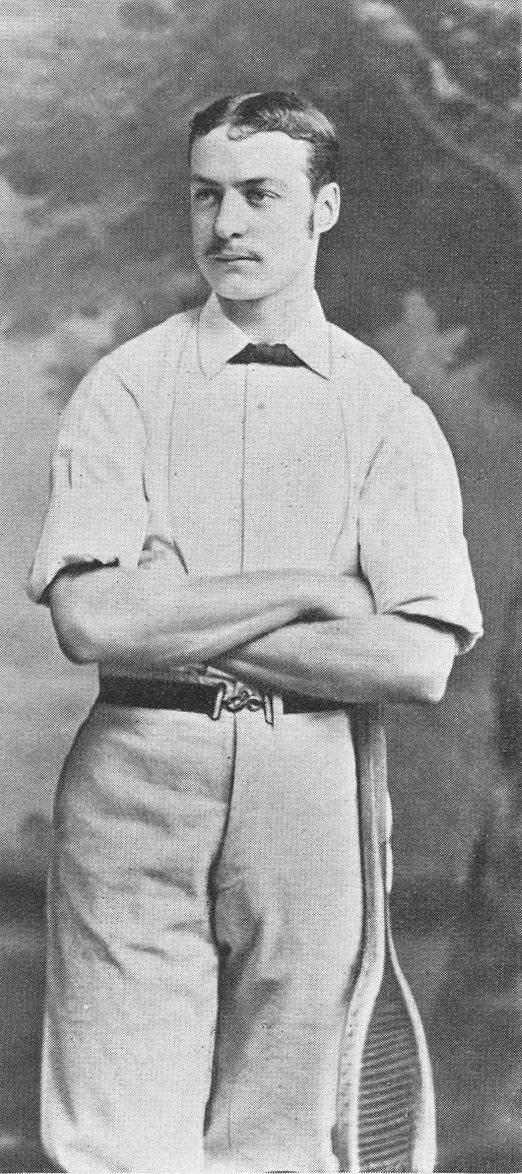
- Ernest Wool Lewis from England is the title leader this year.

Details
- Duration: 2 January – 12 November
- Tournaments: 149
- Categories: Important (4); National (6); Provincial/Regional/State (25); County (19); Regular (75)

Achievements (singles)
- Most titles: (United Kingdom) Ernest Lewis (8)
- Most finals: (United Kingdom) Ernest Lewis (8)

The 1887 men's tennis season was a world wide tennis calendar composed of 149 major, national, professional, regional, provincial, state, county, city and regular tournaments.

The season began in January in Napier, New Zealand, and ended in December in Christchurch, New Zealand.

== Season summary ==
Prior to the creation of the International Lawn Tennis Federation and the establishment of its world championship events in 1913 the Wimbledon Championships, the U.S. National Championships, the Irish Lawn Tennis Championships and the Northern Championships were considered by players and historians as the four most important tennis tournaments to win.

In the first big tournament of the year Ernest Renshaw wins a second Irish Lawn Tennis Championships title, in Dublin after a five-year break beating three-time defending champion Herbert Lawford in four sets. At the Wimbledon Championships Herbert Lawford avenges his Irish championships defeat by beating Ernest Renshaw for the title in five sets. At the Northern Championships in Liverpool, Harry Grove the defending champion defeats George Ernest Dixon Brown in five sets. In the United States Dick Sears wins a seventh consecutive US National Championship beating Henry Slocum in three sets.

In March in the United States the inaugural Southern California Championships is staged and in New Zealand the Auckland Tennis Championships are held for the first time. In April in England Ernest Lewis defeats Edward Lake Williams in three sets for his first British Covered Court Championships. In May in South Asia, Charles Edward De Fonblanque defeats Edward George Farquharson in the Ceylon Championships held on the clay courts in Nuwara Eliya.

In early June at the Scottish Championships held in Edinburgh, Harry Grove of England defeats two-time defending champion Patrick Bowes-Lyon in five sets. In late June at the Welsh Championships in Penarth Irish player Ernest Browne wins a second title after English player James Baldwin retired after two sets to love down. In July in North America at the Canadian National Championships held in Toronto, Canada Charles Smith Hyman wins a third title defeating Lawrence H. Baldwin in three sets. In August the Nottinghamshire Championships are staged for the first time in England; this event is known today as the Nottingham Open.

In October in the United States Philip Shelton Sears representing Harvard wins his first national Intercollegiate Championships at New Haven, Connecticut defeating G.G. Shaw jr in three sets. In late December in Australasia at Christchurch, New Zealand, Percival Clennell Fenwick wins his second national New Zealand Championships defeating Richard Dacre Harman in five sets.

== Season results ==
Notes 1: Challenge Round: the final round of a tournament, in which the winner of a single-elimination phase faces the previous year's champion, who plays only that one match. The challenge round was used in the early history of tennis (from 1877 through 1921), in some tournaments not all.

* Indicates challenger

Notes 2:Tournaments in italics were events that were staged only once that season

Key

Important.
National
Provincial/State/Regional
County
Local

=== January ===
Date	Tournament	Winner	Finalist	Semi-finalist	Quarter-finalist
30 December 1886 – 2 January 1887.	Napier Open; Farndon Park; Napier, New Zealand; Surface? Singles – Doubles	(New Zealand) Percival Clennell Fenwick; 6–2 6–0 6–4	(New Zealand) E.P. Hudson		

=== February ===
No events

=== March ===
Date	Tournament	Winner	Finalist	Semi-finalist	Quarter-finalist
1–3.	St Augustine Lawn Tennis Club Tournament; St. Augustine, United States; Wood (i); Singles – Doubles	(United States) Thomas S. Beckworth; 6–2 1–6 5–7 6–4 6–4	(United States) Albert Empie Wright		
10–21.	Auckland Tennis Championships, Auckland, New Zealand; Hard (outdoor); Singles; Doubles	(United Kingdom of Great Britain and Ireland) William Morrison; 4–6, 4–6, 6–2, 6–4, 6–2	(New Zealand) Henry Andrew Morey		
19–24. (Note: Two events of the Southern California Championship were staged in 1887 the first in March the second in August.)	Southern California Championships; Casa Blanca Club; Riverside, California, United States; Asphalt; Singles; Doubles	(United States) William H. Young	(United States) C. Trevelia		

=== April ===
Date	Tournament	Winner	Finalist	Semi-finalist	Quarter-finalist
April.	Bengal Lawn Tennis Championships; Calcutta Cricket Ground; Calcutta, Bengal, India; Grass; Singles; Doubles	(United Kingdom) Gilbert Mahon; 5–7, 8–7, 7–8, 8–6, 6–1	(United Kingdom) Mr. Heckle		
9 – 12 April.	Geelong Easter Handicap Tournament; Geelong LTC; Geelong, Australia; Hard Asphalt; Singles – Doubles	(Australia) Ernest Raleigh; 6–2 6–0 6–4	(Australia) John Stanley Barton Orr	(Australia) W.L. Hewitt	(Australia) J.W. Colville (Australia) Beckett Weigall
21 – 23 April.	British Covered Court Championships; Hyde Park LTC; London, Great Britain; Wood (i); Singles – Doubles	(United Kingdom of Great Britain and Ireland) Ernest Wool Lewis; 6–2, 6–2, 6–1	(United Kingdom of Great Britain and Ireland) Andrew George Ziffo	(United Kingdom of Great Britain and Ireland) Herbert Chipp (United Kingdom of Great Britain and Ireland) Frank Still	(Greece) Anthony Sophocles Constantinidi (United Kingdom of Great Britain and Ireland) Ernest George Meers (United Kingdom of Great Britain and Ireland) William John Bush-Salmon (Scotland) George Nelson Stenhouse
21 – 23 April.	British Covered Court Championships; Hyde Park LTC; London, Great Britain; Wood (i); Singles – Doubles	Challenger (United Kingdom of Great Britain and Ireland) Edward Lake Williams		(United Kingdom of Great Britain and Ireland) Herbert Chipp (United Kingdom of Great Britain and Ireland) Frank Still	(Greece) Anthony Sophocles Constantinidi (United Kingdom of Great Britain and Ireland) Ernest George Meers (United Kingdom of Great Britain and Ireland) William John Bush-Salmon (Scotland) George Nelson Stenhouse

=== May ===
Date	Tournament	Winner	Finalist	Semi-finalist	Quarter-finalist
1–3 May. (Note: The Ceylon Championships were staged at the Hill Club LTC, Nuwara Eliya, Ceylon from 1884 until 1971. In 1972 following independence Ceylon's name changed to Sri Lanka and this tournament was then called the Sri Lankan Championships until 1976.)	Ceylon Championships; Nuwara Eliya Lawn Tennis Club; Nuwara Eliya, Ceylon; Clay; Singles – Doubles	(United Kingdom of Great Britain and Ireland) Charles Edward De Fonblanque; 6–4, 6–4, 6–2	(United Kingdom of Great Britain and Ireland) Edward George Farquharson	(United Kingdom of Great Britain and Ireland) Henry Edwin Caldecott (United Kingdom of Great Britain and Ireland) Thomas W. Gallwey	(United Kingdom of Great Britain and Ireland) P. Burrows (United Kingdom of Great Britain and Ireland) John Melville Boustead (United Kingdom of Great Britain and Ireland) J.C. Rogers
24 April- 5 May.	Fitzwilliam Club Championships; Fitzwilliam LTC; Dublin, Ireland; Hard	(Ireland) Willoughby Hamilton; 6–3 6–4 6–0	(Ireland) Grainger Chaytor	(Ireland) Ernest Henry Greene (Ireland) J.F. Hughes	(Ireland) Tom Campion (Ireland) Ernest Edward Knox (Ireland) Henry A. Robinson (United Kingdom of Great Britain and Ireland) Cameron Dean-Shute
24 April- 5 May.	Fitzwilliam Club Championships; Fitzwilliam LTC; Dublin, Ireland; Hard	Challenger (United Kingdom of Great Britain and Ireland) J. T. Maxwell		(Ireland) Ernest Henry Greene (Ireland) J.F. Hughes	(Ireland) Tom Campion (Ireland) Ernest Edward Knox (Ireland) Henry A. Robinson (United Kingdom of Great Britain and Ireland) Cameron Dean-Shute
2–9 May.	Dublin University Championships; Dublin; Ireland; Hard	(Ireland) Manliffe Goodbody; 2–6, 6–3, 6–1, 6–0	(Ireland) Tom Campion	(Ireland) Grainger Chaytor (Ireland) James Edgar Lefroy Stein	(Ireland) Harold Mahony (Ireland) William Woodcock Goodbody (Ireland) Robert Edward Shaw (Ireland) John Thomas Waller
4–10 May.	New South Wales Championships; Association Cricket Ground; Moore Park; Sydney, Australia; Singles – Doubles	(Australia) Charles William Cropper; 6–0, 6–0, 5–7, 8–6	(Australia) Robert D. Fitzgerald	(Australia) Harold Stuart Fox (Australia) Walter John Carre Riddell	(Australia) Charles Theophilius Metcalfe (Australia) Edward Alworth Mitchell Merewether (Australia) Haworth William Bartram (Australia) Reginald Charles (Rex) Allen
19 – 20 May.	West of Scotland Championships; Pollockshields; Scotland; Grass	(Scotland) John Galbraith Horn; 6–3, 8–6, 6–2	(Scotland) J.T.C. MacKinlay	(England) James Hill Conyers (Scotland) Alfred Aitken Thomson	C.A. Gairdner (Scotland) George Kerr (England) Henry Guy Nadin (Scotland) H.J. Younger
19 - 20 May.	Western Counties Championship; Pollockshields Athletic Club; Pollockshields, Glasgow, Lanarkshire, Scotland; Grass; Singles - Doubles	(Scotland) Herbert Bowes-Lyon; 6-4 7-5 6-3	(Scotland) Archibald Thomson	(United Kingdom) Walter William Chamberlain (England) James Hill Conyers	(Scotland) James Cleland Burns (Scotland) T. Leigh MacLachlan (Scotland) Edward Mortimer Shand (Scotland) Richard Millar Watson
27 May.	Young America Cricket Club Invitation; Young America Cricket Club; Stanton, Philadelphia, Pennsylvania, United States; Grass; Singles – Doubles	(United States) Howard Augustus Taylor; 6-3, 2-6, 6-4, 5-7, 6-1	(United States) Robert Livingston Beeckman	(United States) Clarence Munroe Clark (United States) Oliver Samuel Campbell	
23 – 28 May.	Fitzwilliam Purse; Fitzwilliam LTC; Dublin, Ireland; Grass	(Scotland) Patrick Bowes-Lyon; 8–6 8–6 6–3	(United Kingdom of Great Britain and Ireland) Harry Grove	(Ireland) Manliffe Francis Goodbody (United Kingdom of Great Britain and Ireland) Cameron Dean-Shute	(Ireland) Robert Cully Barton (Ireland) Tom Campion (Ireland) Edward Bernard Greene (England) John Morgan Richards Francis
23 – 28 May.	Irish Lawn Tennis Championships; Dublin, Ireland; Grass	(United Kingdom of Great Britain and Ireland) Ernest Renshaw; 7–5, 6–2, 9–7	(Ireland) Willoughby James Hamilton	(Ireland) Arthur John de Courcy Wilson (Ireland) Harold Segerson Mahony	(Ireland) Grainger Chaytor (Ireland) W. H. Clark (United Kingdom of Great Britain and Ireland) Thomas Harrison Griffiths (United Kingdom of Great Britain and Ireland) Herbert Wilberforce
23 – 28 May.	Irish Lawn Tennis Championships; Dublin, Ireland; Grass	Challenger (United Kingdom of Great Britain and Ireland) Herbert Lawford		(Ireland) Arthur John de Courcy Wilson (Ireland) Harold Segerson Mahony	(Ireland) Grainger Chaytor (Ireland) W. H. Clark (United Kingdom of Great Britain and Ireland) Thomas Harrison Griffiths (United Kingdom of Great Britain and Ireland) Herbert Wilberforce
27 – 30 May.	Marine and Field Club Tennis Tournament; Marine and Field Club, Bath Beach, Brooklyn, New York City; US; Hard Asphalt	(United States) Grant Notman; 6–4, 4–6, 6–3, 5–6, 6–4	(United States) J.W. Raymond	(United States) Carroll J. Post Jr.	(United States) Oliver Samuel Campbell (United States) Starks Battersball

=== June ===
Date	Tournament	Winner	Finalist	Semi-finalist	Quarter-finalist
1- 3 June. (Note: Source lists location as Broughty, Scotland. Broughty Lawn Tennis Club opened in 1921 it is possible there was an earlier club at Broughty Ferry, Dundee. The West End Tennis Club which is in close proximity to Broughty was founded in 1880.)	Broughty Ferry Open; Dundee, Scotland; Clay; Singles – Doubles	(United Kingdom of Great Britain and Ireland) A. Browne; 1–6, 6–4, ret.	(Scotland) Alfred Aitken Thomson	(Scotland) William Henry Blyth-Martin (United Kingdom of Great Britain and Ireland) J. Rodger	(United Kingdom of Great Britain and Ireland) D.O. Beatson (United Kingdom of Great Britain and Ireland) J.B. Gray (United Kingdom of Great Britain and Ireland) W.F.M. Ross (United Kingdom of Great Britain and Ireland) S.C. Thomson
30 May – 4 June.	West of England Championships; Bath, Great Britain; Grass; Singles – Doubles	(United Kingdom of Great Britain and Ireland) Harry Grove; 6–4 6–3 6–4	(United States) James Dwight	(Ireland) Ernest Browne (United Kingdom of Great Britain and Ireland) James Baldwin)	(United Kingdom of Great Britain and Ireland) Cecil Owtram Gillbanks (United Kingdom of Great Britain and Ireland) Mark Anthony Hartnell (United Kingdom of Great Britain and Ireland) F.O.S. O'Shaughnessy Reade (United Kingdom of Great Britain and Ireland) Charles Lacy Sweet
30 May – 4 June.	West of England Championships; Bath, Great Britain; Grass; Singles – Doubles	(Ireland) Ernest Browne (United Kingdom of Great Britain and Ireland) William Renshaw; 10-8, 6-4	(United States) James Dwight (United Kingdom of Great Britain and Ireland) Harry Grove	(Ireland) Ernest Browne (United Kingdom of Great Britain and Ireland) James Baldwin)	(United Kingdom of Great Britain and Ireland) Cecil Owtram Gillbanks (United Kingdom of Great Britain and Ireland) Mark Anthony Hartnell (United Kingdom of Great Britain and Ireland) F.O.S. O'Shaughnessy Reade (United Kingdom of Great Britain and Ireland) Charles Lacy Sweet
30 May – 4 June.	West of England Championships; Bath, Great Britain; Grass; Singles – Doubles	(United States) James Dwight (United Kingdom of Great Britain and Ireland) Lottie Dod; 6-4, 4-6, 6-1	(United Kingdom of Great Britain and Ireland) William Renshaw (United Kingdom of Great Britain and Ireland) Margaret Bracewell	(Ireland) Ernest Browne (United Kingdom of Great Britain and Ireland) James Baldwin)	(United Kingdom of Great Britain and Ireland) Cecil Owtram Gillbanks (United Kingdom of Great Britain and Ireland) Mark Anthony Hartnell (United Kingdom of Great Britain and Ireland) F.O.S. O'Shaughnessy Reade (United Kingdom of Great Britain and Ireland) Charles Lacy Sweet
1 - 4 June.	Whitehouse Open; Whitehouse Lawn Tennis Club; Edinburgh, Lothian, Scotland; Outdoor; Clay	(Scotland) Herbert Bowes-Lyon; 3-6, 6-3, 6-0, 6-2	(Scotland) Richard Millar Watson	(United Kingdom of Great Britain and Ireland) James Hill Conyers (Scotland) Alfred Aitken Thomson	(Scotland) William Ferguson (Scotland) John Galbraith Horn (Scotland) Charles Allen Casterton Smelt (Scotland) Anderson Steel
1 - 4 June.	Whitehouse Open; Whitehouse Lawn Tennis Club; Edinburgh, Lothian, Scotland; Outdoor; Clay	Challenge round (United Kingdom) Arthur Nevile John Story		(United Kingdom of Great Britain and Ireland) James Hill Conyers (Scotland) Alfred Aitken Thomson	(Scotland) William Ferguson (Scotland) John Galbraith Horn (Scotland) Charles Allen Casterton Smelt (Scotland) Anderson Steel
1 - 4 June.	Whitehouse Open; Whitehouse Lawn Tennis Club; Edinburgh, Lothian, Scotland; Outdoor; Clay	(Scotland) John Galbraith Horn (Scotland) Herbert Bowes-Lyon; 4-6, 5-7, 6-4, 6-4, 6-3	(Scotland) Alfred Aitken Thomson (Scotland) Anderson Steel	(United Kingdom of Great Britain and Ireland) James Hill Conyers (Scotland) Alfred Aitken Thomson	(Scotland) William Ferguson (Scotland) John Galbraith Horn (Scotland) Charles Allen Casterton Smelt (Scotland) Anderson Steel
1 - 4 June.	Whitehouse Open; Whitehouse Lawn Tennis Club; Edinburgh, Lothian, Scotland; Outdoor; Clay	(Scotland) John Galbraith Horn (Scotland) Dorothy Boutlon; 6-2, 3-6, 12-10	(Scotland) Richard Millar Watson (Scotland) Mabel Boulton	(United Kingdom of Great Britain and Ireland) James Hill Conyers (Scotland) Alfred Aitken Thomson	(Scotland) William Ferguson (Scotland) John Galbraith Horn (Scotland) Charles Allen Casterton Smelt (Scotland) Anderson Steel
2- 4 June.	Middle States Championships; Hoboken, NJ, United States; Singles – Doubles	(United States) Robert L. Beeckman; 1–6, 8–6, 6–2, 6–8, 6–1	(United States) Howard Taylor	(United States) Joseph Sill Clark (United States) Henry Slocum	(United States) Valentine Gill Hall (United States) Samuel A. Campbell Jr. (United States) Edward Peale MacMullen (United States) Juan A. Smith
6 – 7 June.	Oxford University Champion Tournament; Norham Gardens, Oxford, Great Britain; Grass; Singles – Doubles	(United Kingdom of Great Britain and Ireland) Thomas Musgrave Burton; 4–6, 6–3, 7–5, 6–3	(United Kingdom of Great Britain and Ireland) Harry Stanley Scrivener	(United Kingdom of Great Britain and Ireland) H.J. Burrell (United States) Hamilton A. Emmons	(United Kingdom of Great Britain and Ireland) William Marshall Cazalet (United Kingdom of Great Britain and Ireland) Horace Chapman (United Kingdom of Great Britain and Ireland) Anthony Sophocles Constantinidi (United Kingdom of Great Britain and Ireland) Henry Edwin Hunter Kent
6 -11 June.	East Gloucestershire Championships; Cheltenham, Great Britain; Grass; Singles – Doubles	(Ireland) Ernest Browne; 3–6, 6–3, 6–1, 4–6, 6–2	(United States) James Dwight	(United Kingdom of Great Britain and Ireland) James Baldwin (United Kingdom of Great Britain and Ireland) Alfred Penn Gaskell	(United Kingdom of Great Britain and Ireland) E.W. Brooke (United Kingdom of Great Britain and Ireland) G.L. Bruce (United Kingdom of Great Britain and Ireland) John Redfern Deykin (United Kingdom of Great Britain and Ireland) J. Muir MacDonald
6 -11 June.	East Gloucestershire Championships; Cheltenham, Great Britain; Grass; Singles – Doubles	(United Kingdom of Great Britain and Ireland) John Redfern Deykin (England) Maud Watson; 6-2, 6-1, 6-4	(United States) James Dwight (United Kingdom of Great Britain and Ireland) Margaret Bracewell	(United Kingdom of Great Britain and Ireland) James Baldwin (United Kingdom of Great Britain and Ireland) Alfred Penn Gaskell	(United Kingdom of Great Britain and Ireland) E.W. Brooke (United Kingdom of Great Britain and Ireland) G.L. Bruce (United Kingdom of Great Britain and Ireland) John Redfern Deykin (United Kingdom of Great Britain and Ireland) J. Muir MacDonald
6 -11 June.	County Wexford Tournament; Wexford Lawn Tennis Club; Wexford, County Wexford, Ireland; Grass; Singles – Doubles	(Ireland) George Foley; 6-1 6-2	(England) Edmond T. M. Sandwith	(Ireland) W. Toole	(Ireland) R. Dowse (Ireland) R. Hudson
6 – 11 June.	Scottish Championships; Edinburgh, Great Britain; Singles – Doubles	(United Kingdom of Great Britain and Ireland) Patrick Bowes-Lyon; 6–3, 6–3, 1–6, 2–6, 6–2	(United Kingdom) Archibald Thomson		
6 – 11 June.	Scottish Championships; Edinburgh, Great Britain; Singles – Doubles	Challenge round (United Kingdom) Herbert Bowes-Lyon			
7 – 13 June. (Note: The Baltimore Invitational later became known as the Mid Atlantic Invitational played at Baltimore Cricket Club.)	Baltimore Invitation; Baltimore Cricket Club, Baltimore, US; Grass; Singles – Doubles	(United States) Alexander Post; 6–4, 3–6, 6–2, 6–5	(United States) Charles Laurie McCawley		
8 – 10 June.	Brooklyn Hill Tennis Club Tournament; Brooklyn Hill Tennis Club, Brooklyn, New York, US; Grass; Singles – Doubles	(United States) Edward MacMullen; 6–4, 4–6, 6–3, 5–6, 6–4	(United States) Valentine Gill Hall		
8 – 14 June. (Note: Played at Cavan Lawn Tennis Club that opened in 1887-8.)	County Cavan Lawn Tennis Tournament; Cavan, Ireland; Grass; Singles – Doubles	(Ireland) William P. French; 8–6, 6–2, 1–6, 6–2	(United Kingdom of Great Britain and Ireland) F. Graham	(Ireland) W. Halpin (Ireland) A. Kennedy	(Ireland) R. Allen (Ireland) Lord Newtonbutler (Ireland) M. O'Reilly (Ireland) J. Weekes
8 – 14 June.	Challenger (United Kingdom of Great Britain and Ireland) J.S.F. Hearn			(Ireland) W. Halpin (Ireland) A. Kennedy	(Ireland) R. Allen (Ireland) Lord Newtonbutler (Ireland) M. O'Reilly (Ireland) J. Weekes
13 – 15 Jun.	New England Championships; New Haven LTC; New Haven, Connecticut United States; Singles – Doubles	(United States) Henry Slocum; 1–6, 6–2, 6–4, 6–1	(United States) William Larned Thacher	(United States) F.T. Ball (United States) C.H. Ludington jr	(United States) Francis Gibbons (Frank) Beach (United States) Mr. Harmer (United States) Grant Notman (United States) Mr. Pratt
16–17 June.	Macclesfield Open Lawn Tennis Tournament; Macclesfield, Great Britain; Outdoor; Grass; Singles – Doubles	(United Kingdom of Great Britain and Ireland) Henry Guy Nadin; 6–3, 6–4, 2–6, 8–6	(United Kingdom of Great Britain and Ireland) G.E. Lowe	(United Kingdom of Great Britain and Ireland) John Barlow Thistlethwaite (United Kingdom of Great Britain and Ireland) G.H. Willoughby	(United Kingdom of Great Britain and Ireland) W. Burgess (United Kingdom of Great Britain and Ireland) H.R. Greaves (United Kingdom of Great Britain and Ireland) J.A. Rooke (United Kingdom of Great Britain and Ireland) W. Twyford
13 – 18 June.	Welsh Championships; Penarth, Great Britain; Singles – Doubles	(Ireland) Ernest Browne; 6–0 retired	(United Kingdom) Arthur John de Courcy Wilson	(United Kingdom of Great Britain and Ireland) F.E. Gibbs (United Kingdom of Great Britain and Ireland) Ernest Legassicke Hancock	(United Kingdom of Great Britain and Ireland) Ernest Renshaw (United Kingdom of Great Britain and Ireland) A. Morton Smith (United Kingdom of Great Britain and Ireland) Charles Lacy Sweet (United Kingdom of Great Britain and Ireland) A. Tanner
13 – 18 June.	Welsh Championships; Penarth, Great Britain; Singles – Doubles	Challenger (United Kingdom) James Baldwin		(United Kingdom of Great Britain and Ireland) F.E. Gibbs (United Kingdom of Great Britain and Ireland) Ernest Legassicke Hancock	(United Kingdom of Great Britain and Ireland) Ernest Renshaw (United Kingdom of Great Britain and Ireland) A. Morton Smith (United Kingdom of Great Britain and Ireland) Charles Lacy Sweet (United Kingdom of Great Britain and Ireland) A. Tanner
13 – 18 June.	London Championships; London Athletic Club, Stamford Bridge, London, Great Britain; Singles – Doubles	(United Kingdom of Great Britain and Ireland) Ernest Lewis; 6–2, 8–6, 6–4	(United Kingdom of Great Britain and Ireland) Harry S. Barlow	(United Kingdom of Great Britain and Ireland) Ernest George Meers (United Kingdom of Great Britain and Ireland) George Richmond Mewburn	(United Kingdom of Great Britain and Ireland) Alfred Penn Gaskell (United Kingdom of Great Britain and Ireland) William John Bush-Salmon (United Kingdom of Great Britain and Ireland) Arthur John Stanley (United Kingdom of Great Britain and Ireland) Frank Still
13 – 18 June.	London Championships; London Athletic Club, Stamford Bridge, London, Great Britain; Singles – Doubles	Challenger (United Kingdom) Herbert Chipp		(United Kingdom of Great Britain and Ireland) Ernest George Meers (United Kingdom of Great Britain and Ireland) George Richmond Mewburn	(United Kingdom of Great Britain and Ireland) Alfred Penn Gaskell (United Kingdom of Great Britain and Ireland) William John Bush-Salmon (United Kingdom of Great Britain and Ireland) Arthur John Stanley (United Kingdom of Great Britain and Ireland) Frank Still
13–19 June.	Waterloo Tournament; Liverpool, Great Britain; Outdoor; Grass; Singles – Doubles	(United Kingdom of Great Britain and Ireland) Jacob Brown; 6–3, 6–4, 2–6, 8–6	(United Kingdom of Great Britain and Ireland) William Dod	(United Kingdom of Great Britain and Ireland) Climenson Charles Dawbarn (United Kingdom of Great Britain and Ireland) E. Horley	(United Kingdom of Great Britain and Ireland) William Gerald Barker (United Kingdom of Great Britain and Ireland) John Charles Kay (United Kingdom of Great Britain and Ireland) Andrew Laurie Macfie
13–19 June.	Waterloo Tournament; Liverpool, Great Britain; Outdoor; Grass; Singles – Doubles	Challenger (United Kingdom) William Parkfield Wethered		(United Kingdom of Great Britain and Ireland) Climenson Charles Dawbarn (United Kingdom of Great Britain and Ireland) E. Horley	(United Kingdom of Great Britain and Ireland) William Gerald Barker (United Kingdom of Great Britain and Ireland) John Charles Kay (United Kingdom of Great Britain and Ireland) Andrew Laurie Macfie
20 – 25 June.	Kent Championships; Beckenham Lawn Tennis Club; Beckenham, Great Britain; Grass; Singles – Doubles	(United Kingdom of Great Britain and Ireland) Frederick Bowlby; 1–6, 8–6, 6–4, 6–1	(United Kingdom of Great Britain and Ireland) Harry Sibthorpe Barlow	(United Kingdom of Great Britain and Ireland) Edward James Avory (United Kingdom of Great Britain and Ireland) Ernest George Meers	(United Kingdom of Great Britain and Ireland) Alfred Penn Gaskell (United Kingdom of Great Britain and Ireland) H.C. Lewin (Scotland) George Nelson Stenhouse (United Kingdom of Great Britain and Ireland) William C. Taylor
20 – 25 June.	Kent Championships; Beckenham Lawn Tennis Club; Beckenham, Great Britain; Grass; Singles – Doubles	Challenger (United Kingdom of Great Britain and Ireland) Herbert Chipp		(United Kingdom of Great Britain and Ireland) Edward James Avory (United Kingdom of Great Britain and Ireland) Ernest George Meers	(United Kingdom of Great Britain and Ireland) Alfred Penn Gaskell (United Kingdom of Great Britain and Ireland) H.C. Lewin (Scotland) George Nelson Stenhouse (United Kingdom of Great Britain and Ireland) William C. Taylor
21 – 24 June.	New York Tennis Club Open; New York City, United States; Grass; Singles – Doubles	(United States) Clarence Hobart; 6–2, 6–1, 6–2	(United States) P.B. Ruggles		
22 – 26 June.	Orange Spring Tournament; Montrose, South Orange, New Jersey, United States; Grass; Singles – Doubles	(United States) Oliver Campbell; 1–6, 6–2, 7–5, 6–4	(United States) Edward Peale MacMullen	(United States) Grant Notman (United States) Jackson C. Wilmerding	(United States) Francis Gibbons (Frank) Beach (United States) Valentine Gill Hall (United States) Clarence Hobart (United States) William Larned Thacher
20 – 25 June.	Northern Championships; Liverpool, Great Britain; Grass; Singles – Doubles	(United Kingdom of Great Britain and Ireland) Harry Grove; 4–6, 6–2, 8–10, 6–4, 6–2	(United Kingdom of Great Britain and Ireland) George Ernest Dixon Brown	(United Kingdom of Great Britain and Ireland) Mark Anthony Hartnell (United Kingdom of Great Britain and Ireland) Archibald Thomson	(United Kingdom of Great Britain and Ireland) Jacob Gaitskell Brown (United Kingdom of Great Britain and Ireland) Robert Wallace Glen Lee Braddell (United Kingdom of Great Britain and Ireland) William Parkfield Wethered (United Kingdom of Great Britain and Ireland) Andrew Laurie Macfie
20 – 25 June.	Northern Championships; Liverpool, Great Britain; Grass; Singles – Doubles	Challenge round (Ireland) Grainger Chaytor		(United Kingdom of Great Britain and Ireland) Mark Anthony Hartnell (United Kingdom of Great Britain and Ireland) Archibald Thomson	(United Kingdom of Great Britain and Ireland) Jacob Gaitskell Brown (United Kingdom of Great Britain and Ireland) Robert Wallace Glen Lee Braddell (United Kingdom of Great Britain and Ireland) William Parkfield Wethered (United Kingdom of Great Britain and Ireland) Andrew Laurie Macfie

=== July ===
Date	Tournament	Winner	Finalist	Semi-finalist	Quarter-finalist
2 July. (Note: The 1st County Dublin Championships started 27 June to 2 July 1887)	County Dublin Championships; Lansdowne Lawn Tennis Club; Dublin, Ireland; Grass; Singles – Doubles	(Ireland) Willoughby Hamilton; 8–6, 6–2, 6–2	(Ireland) Tom Campion		
2 July.	Championship of Lanarkshire; Hamilton Lawn Tennis Club; Hamilton, Lanarkshire, Scotland; Grass; Singles – Doubles	(Scotland) G. Scott-Jackson; 6-1 6-4 ret.	(Scotland) D.G. Kemp		
2 July. (Note: Edgbaston Cricket & Lawn Tennis Club tournament started 28 June to 2 July 1887)	Edgbaston Open Tournament; Edgbaston Cricket & Lawn Tennis Club; Edgbaston, England; Grass; Singles – Doubles	(United Kingdom of Great Britain and Ireland) Percy B. Brown; 4–6, 6–2, 6–3, 5–7, 6–1	(United Kingdom of Great Britain and Ireland) G.E. Lowe		
2 July. (Note: Midland Counties Championships started 28 June to 2 July 1887)	Midland Counties Championships; Edgbaston Cricket & Lawn Tennis Club; Edgbaston, England; Grass; Singles – Doubles	(United Kingdom of Great Britain and Ireland) John Redfern Deykin; 6–4, 6–4, 6–2	(United Kingdom of Great Britain and Ireland) Frank Noon		
30 Jun–2 July	Northumberland Cricket Club Open; Newcastle upon Tyne, Great Britain; Grass; Singles - Doubles	(United Kingdom of Great Britain and Ireland) Kenneth Ramsden Marley; 3-6 6-2 6-4 6-1	(United Kingdom of Great Britain and Ireland) Charles Liddell	(United Kingdom of Great Britain and Ireland) Frederick T. Bradbury (United Kingdom of Great Britain and Ireland) John Parker Marsh	(United Kingdom of Great Britain and Ireland) George Bloomfield Garvey (United Kingdom of Great Britain and Ireland) Howard Pease (United Kingdom of Great Britain and Ireland) Hugh A. Taylor (United Kingdom of Great Britain and Ireland) C.A. Woods
2 July. (Note: The Burton on Trent Tennis tournament was staged at the Burton on Trent cricket ground)	Burton-on-Trent Open; Burton on Trent Cricket Ground; Burton on Trent, England; Grass; Singles – Doubles	(United Kingdom of Great Britain and Ireland) G. E. Lowe; 7–5, 8–6, 6–1	(United Kingdom of Great Britain and Ireland) Henry G. Nadin		
2 July.	Staten Island Invitation; Livingston, New Jersey, US; Grass; Singles – Doubles	(United States) Henry Slocum; 6–4, 6–8, 6–1, 9–7	(United States) Edward MacMullen		
2 – 7 July	Wimbledon Championships; London, Great Britain; Singles – Doubles	(Scotland) Herbert Lawford; 6–2, 6–3, 2–6, 4–6, 6–4	(United Kingdom) Ernest Renshaw	(United Kingdom) Harry Grove (United Kingdom) Charles Lacy Sweet	(Scotland) Herbert Bowes-Lyon (United Kingdom) Ernest Wool Lewis (United Kingdom) Oswald Milne (United Kingdom) Wilfred Milne
2 – 7 July	Wimbledon Championships; London, Great Britain; Singles – Doubles	(Scotland) Patrick Bowes-Lyon (United Kingdom) Herbert Wilberforce; 6–3, 6–3, 6–2	(United Kingdom) Edward Barratt-Smith (United Kingdom) James Herbert Crispe	(United Kingdom) Harry Grove (United Kingdom) Charles Lacy Sweet	(Scotland) Herbert Bowes-Lyon (United Kingdom) Ernest Wool Lewis (United Kingdom) Oswald Milne (United Kingdom) Wilfred Milne
4 – 8 July.	Western States Championships; Chicago Lawn Tennis Club; Chicago, United States; Clay; Singles – Doubles	(United States) Charles A. Chase; 7–5, 6–3, 6–4	(United States) B. F. Cummins		
7- 9 July.	Chapel Allerton LTC Tournament; Chapel Allerton Lawn Tennis Club; Chapel Allerton, England; Grass; Singles – Doubles	(United Kingdom) Ernest W. Fletcher; 7–5, 6–0, 4–6, 6–0	(United Kingdom) George Graham Stewart Grundy		
7 - 12 July.	Westchester Invitation; Westchester Country Club; Harrison, New York, USA; Grass; Singles - Doubles	(United States) Henry Slocum; 7-5, 6-4	(United States) Valentine Hall	(United States) Deane B. Miller (United States) W.H. Sands	(United States) P.D. Chase (United States) J. Lorillard jr. (United States) Charles Edward Sands (United States) R. Zerega
11- 12 July.	Stevenage Open; Stevenage, England; Grass; Singles – Doubles	(United Kingdom of Great Britain and Ireland) Charles G. Eames; 7–5, 6–3	(United Kingdom of Great Britain and Ireland) W. Dunn		
11- 14 July. (Note: The Warwickshire Championships were played at the Leamington Lawn Tennis Club that opened in 1872.)	Warwickshire Championships; Leamington Lawn Tennis Club; Leamington Spa, England; Grass; Singles – Doubles	(United States) James Dwight; 6–2, 6–2, 6–0	(United Kingdom of Great Britain and Ireland) L. Richardson		
14- 16 July.	Armagh ALTC Championship; Armagh, Ireland; Grass; Singles – Doubles	(Ireland) Hagan W. Jones; 7–5, 6–3	(Ireland) T. Dickson	?	
14- 16 July.	Leicester Open; Leicester Lawn Tennis and Quoit Club; Leicester, England; Grass; Singles – Doubles	(United Kingdom) Ernest Wool Lewis; 6–3, 6–3, 6–3	(Ireland) Tom Campion	?	
10 – 17 July.	Natal Championships; Pietermaritzburg, South Africa; Grass; Singles; Doubles	(South Africa) William J. Grant; 6–1, 6–3, 6–4	(South Africa) Eric Seabourne		
15- 18 July. (Note: The Moseley Tennis Tournament was staged at the Moseley Park Lawn Tennis Club founded in 1881.)	Molesey Park Lawn Tennis Tournament; Moseley Park Lawn Tennis Club; Birmingham, England; Grass; Singles – Doubles	(United Kingdom of Great Britain and Ireland) G.F. Goodman; 6–3, 6–3, 6–3	(United Kingdom of Great Britain and Ireland) W. Hasluck	?	
19–21 Jul.	Somersetshire Championships; West Somerset LTC; Taunton, Somerset, England; Grass; Singles - Doubles	(United Kingdom of Great Britain and Ireland) James Baldwin w.o.	(United Kingdom) Ernest Legassicke Hancock	(United Kingdom of Great Britain and Ireland) C.L. Fox (United Kingdom of Great Britain and Ireland) J. Hare	(United Kingdom of Great Britain and Ireland) A.S. Archdale (United Kingdom of Great Britain and Ireland) R.W. Fox (United Kingdom of Great Britain and Ireland) Francis Slade-Gully (United Kingdom of Great Britain and Ireland) C.R. Rodwell
18 – 23 July. (Note: The Middlesex Championships was staged at the Chiswick Park Club, London.)	Middlesex Championships; Chiswick Park Club; London, England; Grass; Singles – Doubles	(United Kingdom of Great Britain and Ireland) Ernest Lewis; 7–5, 3–6, 6–2, 6–3	(United Kingdom of Great Britain and Ireland) Ernest Meers		
18 – 23 July.	East of Ireland Championships; Howth, Ireland; Grass; Singles – Doubles	(United Kingdom of Great Britain and Ireland) Willoughby Hamilton; 6–1, 4–0, ret.	(United Kingdom of Great Britain and Ireland) Manliffe Francis Goodbody		
19–23 July.	North Wales Challenge Cup; Vale of Clwyd LTC; Denbigh, Vale of Clwyd, Wales; Outdoor; Grass; Singles	(England) Henry James Wilson Fosbery; 6-4, 6-3, 6-3	(Wales) G. Egerton	(United Kingdom of Great Britain and Ireland) Herbert S. Heaton (Wales) J.P. Lewis	(United Kingdom of Great Britain and Ireland) T. Chilton (United Kingdom of Great Britain and Ireland) E.L. Engleheart (Wales) W.T. Jones (Wales) H. Lloyd-Parry
19–23 July.	North Wales Challenge Cup; Vale of Clwyd LTC; Denbigh, Vale of Clwyd, Wales; Outdoor; Grass; Singles	Challenger (England) D.F. Pennant		(United Kingdom of Great Britain and Ireland) Herbert S. Heaton (Wales) J.P. Lewis	(United Kingdom of Great Britain and Ireland) T. Chilton (United Kingdom of Great Britain and Ireland) E.L. Engleheart (Wales) W.T. Jones (Wales) H. Lloyd-Parry
21 – 23 July.	Elberon Lawn Tennis Club Open; Coton Hill Institution Grounds; Elberon, New Jersey, US; Grass; Singles – Doubles	(United States) Robert Beeckman; 4–6, 3–6, 7–5, 6–3, 6–1	(United States) Howard Taylor		
21–23 July.	Staffordshire Lawn Tennis Tournament; Stafford Institute LTC; Stafford, Great Britain; Grass; Singles	(United Kingdom) Frank Seymour Noon; 7–5, 3–6, 6–2, 6–3	(Scotland) Alfred Aitken Thomson	(United Kingdom) Alfred Henry Betham (United Kingdom) G.E. Lowe	(United Kingdom) John Richard Baker (United Kingdom) Henry Guy Nadinn (United Kingdom) Walter Mace Shipman
21–23 July.	Staffordshire Lawn Tennis Tournament; Stafford Institute LTC; Stafford, Great Britain; Grass; Singles	Challenge round (United Kingdom) C.P. Brett		(United Kingdom) Alfred Henry Betham (United Kingdom) G.E. Lowe	(United Kingdom) John Richard Baker (United Kingdom) Henry Guy Nadinn (United Kingdom) Walter Mace Shipman
21 – 23 July. (Note: The Staffordshire Tennis Tournament was staged at The Coton Hill Institution Grounds, Stafford, England.)	Staffordshire Lawn Tennis Tournament; Coton Hill Institution Grounds; Stafford, England; Grass; Singles – Doubles	(United Kingdom of Great Britain and Ireland) Frank Seymour Noon; 7–5, 3–6, 6–2, 6–3	(United Kingdom of Great Britain and Ireland) C.P. Brett *		
21 – 27 July.	Northumberland Championships; Newcastle upon Tyne, England; Grass; Singles – Doubles	(United Kingdom) Patrick Bowes-Lyon; 7–5, 6–0, 3–1, ret.	(United Kingdom) Herbert Bowes-Lyon		
25 – 30 July. (Note: The Derbyshire Championships was originally staged at the Buxton Gardens from 1883. It was an open tournament with ladies and gentlemen's singles played under the title 'Championship of Derbyshire'.)	Derbyshire Championships; Buxton Gardens; Buxton, England; Grass; Singles – Doubles	(Ireland) Tom Campion; 6–2, 6–3, 6–4	(Ireland) W. D. Hamilton		
25 – 30 July. (Note: The Essex Championships was originally first staged at Essex County Cricket Grounds, Brentwood until 1886 before to the Essex County Cricket Club moved to Leyton and the championships were staged there 1887, 1889–90.)	Essex Championships; Leyton, England; Grass; Singles – Doubles	(United Kingdom of Great Britain and Ireland) Ernest Meers; 6–0, 6–1, 6–1	(United Kingdom of Great Britain and Ireland) P. M. Evans		
25 – 30 July.	Essex County Cricket Club Tournament; Essex County Cricket Ground; Leyton, England; Grass; Singles – Doubles	(United Kingdom of Great Britain and Ireland) Ernest Meers; 6–2, 6–4, 6–0	(United Kingdom of Great Britain and Ireland) Alfred E. Walker		
26 – 27 July.	Southampton Invitation; Meadow Club; Southampton, New York, US; Surface ? Singles – Doubles	(United States) Howard Augustus Taylor; 6–4, 7–9, 3–6, 9–7, 6–3	(United States) Henry Warner Slocum Jr.		
29 July.	Canadian Championships; Toronto Lawn Tennis Club; Toronto, Canada; Singles – Doubles	(Canada) Charles Smith Hyman; 6–0, 6–3, 6–3	(Canada) Lawrence H. Baldwin	(Canada) Isidore F. Hellmuth (Canada) W.B. Lee	(Canada) Alexander Galt (Canada) A.J. Hollyerr (Canada) James Noxon (Canada) Andrew E. Plummer
29- 30 July.	Melrose Open; Melrose, Scotland; Grass; Singles – Doubles	(United Kingdom of Great Britain and Ireland) J. Conyers; 6–4, 6–3, 7–9, 6–2	(United Kingdom of Great Britain and Ireland) Kenneth Sanderson	?	

=== August ===
Date	Tournament	Winner	Finalist	Semi-finalist	Quarter-finalist
29 July–1 August.	Rochester Open; Paddock Lawn Tennis Club; Rochester, Kent, England; Grass; Singles	(United Kingdom of Great Britain and Ireland) Charles Gladstone Eames; 8-4, 6-4, 6-3	(United Kingdom of Great Britain and Ireland) Harry T. Shapley	(United Kingdom of Great Britain and Ireland) C.J. Cobb (United Kingdom of Great Britain and Ireland) Philip Francis Cary Elwes	(United Kingdom of Great Britain and Ireland) A. Buchanan (United Kingdom of Great Britain and Ireland) A.B. Green (United Kingdom of Great Britain and Ireland) S.H. Hughes (United Kingdom of Great Britain and Ireland) F.J. Troughton
1 Aug. (Note: The Darlington tennis tournament was staged from 1881 to 1893.)	Darlington Association Tournament; Darlington, England; Grass; Singles – Doubles	(United Kingdom of Great Britain and Ireland) Herbert Wilberforce; 6–0, 6–0, 6–1	(United Kingdom of Great Britain and Ireland) John Galbraith Horn		
1 Aug. (Note: The Exmouth tennis tournament was staged from 1881 to 1975.)	Exmouth Tournament; Exmouth Lawn Tennis Club; Exmouth, England; Singles – Doubles	(United Kingdom) Harry Grove; 6–2 7–9 6–4 7–5	(United Kingdom of Great Britain and Ireland) James Baldwin		
1 Aug. (Note: The East Grinstead tennis tournament was staged from 1882 to 1938.)	East Grinstead Lawn Tennis Tournament; East Grinstead Lawn Tennis & Croquet Club; East Grinstead, England; Singles – Doubles	(United Kingdom of Great Britain and Ireland) Nevill Cobbold; 6–4, 6–2	(United Kingdom of Great Britain and Ireland) William John Down		
1 Aug. (Note: The Waterford Annual Lawn Tennis Tournament was played at Waterford Cricket Club, Rocklands later called Waterford Lawn Tennis club [2] in Ireland on outdoor grass courts from 1880 to 1888 for twelve editions only.)	Waterford Annual Lawn Tennis Tournament; Waterford Lawn Tennis Club; Waterford, Ireland; Singles – Doubles	(Ireland) William Drumond Hamilton; 4–6, 6–2, 6–3, 5–7, 6–1	(Ireland) David Grainger Chaytor		
29 Jul–3 Aug.	Somersetshire Championships; West Somerset LTC; Taunton, Somerset, England; Grass; Singles - Doubles	(United Kingdom of Great Britain and Ireland) James Baldwin; 6-0 6-2	(United Kingdom) William Ilbert Hancock	(United Kingdom of Great Britain and Ireland) T.H. Spencer	(United Kingdom of Great Britain and Ireland) Theodore Alfred Fox (United Kingdom of Great Britain and Ireland) C.L. Fox (United Kingdom of Great Britain and Ireland) J. Hare (United Kingdom of Great Britain and Ireland) G.W.A. Lloyd
29 Jul–3 Aug.	Somersetshire Championships; West Somerset LTC; Taunton, Somerset, England; Grass; Singles - Doubles	Challenger (United Kingdom of Great Britain and Ireland) Ernest Legassicke Hancock		(United Kingdom of Great Britain and Ireland) T.H. Spencer	(United Kingdom of Great Britain and Ireland) Theodore Alfred Fox (United Kingdom of Great Britain and Ireland) C.L. Fox (United Kingdom of Great Britain and Ireland) J. Hare (United Kingdom of Great Britain and Ireland) G.W.A. Lloyd
2-5 Aug.	Wentworth Open Tournament; Hotel Wentworth; New Castle, New Hampshire, United States; Grass; Singles - Doubles	(United States) Henry Slocum; 6–4, 6–0, 6–3	(United States) Philip Shelton Sears	(United States) Charles Amherst Chase (United States) Oliver Samuel Campbell	(United States) Frederick Sherwood Mansfield (United States) Quincy Shaw (United States) Albert Empie Wright
5 Aug. (Note: The first annual tournament of the Nottinghamshire Lawn Tennis Association was held at the Trentbridge Ground today its known as the Nottingham Open)	Nottinghamshire Championships; Trentbridge Ground; Nottingham, England; Grass; Singles – Doubles	(United Kingdom of Great Britain and Ireland) Frederick William Snook; 6–5, 6–2, ret.	(United Kingdom of Great Britain and Ireland) R.W. Miller		
5 Aug.	Inverkip Rovers Open; Wemyss, Castle; Wemyss, Fife, Scotland; Grass; Singles – Doubles	(United Kingdom of Great Britain and Ireland) Archibald Thomson w.o.	(United Kingdom of Great Britain and Ireland) Henry Guy Nadin		
5 Aug.	Rochester Open; Paddock Lawn Tennis Club; Rochester, Kent, England; Grass; Singles – Doubles	(United Kingdom of Great Britain and Ireland) Charles Gladstone Eames; 6–2, 6–2	(United Kingdom of Great Britain and Ireland) H.T. Shapley		
2 -6 Aug.	Waterford Annual Lawn Tennis Tournament; Rocklands, Waterford, Ireland; Grass; Singles - Doubles	(Ireland) William Drumond Hamilton; 6-4, 3-6, 6-1, 0-6, 6-0	(Ireland) Toler Roberts Garvey	(Ireland) Manliffe Francis Goodbody (Scotland) J. Gore	(Ireland) William Gore Burroughs (Ireland) John M. Brown (Ireland) Frederick William Knox (Ireland) Raymond De La Poer
2 -6 Aug.	Waterford Annual Lawn Tennis Tournament; Rocklands, Waterford, Ireland; Grass; Singles - Doubles	Challenger (Ireland) Grainger Chaytor		(Ireland) Manliffe Francis Goodbody (Scotland) J. Gore	(Ireland) William Gore Burroughs (Ireland) John M. Brown (Ireland) Frederick William Knox (Ireland) Raymond De La Poer
5 – 8 August.	Nottinghamshire County Cricket Club Tournament; Trent Bridge Cricket Ground; Nottingham, England; Grass; Singles – Doubles	(United Kingdom of Great Britain and Ireland) Frederick William Snook w.o.	(United Kingdom of Great Britain and Ireland) H.T. Shapley		
6–8 August.	Ilkley Open Tournament; Ilkley Lawn Tennis Club; Ilkley, England; Grass; Singles – Doubles	(United Kingdom of Great Britain and Ireland) E.W. Fletcher; 7–5, 6–2	(United Kingdom of Great Britain and Ireland) George Richmond Mewburn		
8 August.	Nahant Invitation; Bar Harbor Club; Nahant, Massachusetts, US; Clay; Singles – Doubles	(United States) Henry Slocum Jr. ?	(United States) ?		
6 - 10 Aug.	West of Ireland Championships; County Sligo Lawn Tennis Club; Ardaghowen, Sligo, Ireland; Grass; Singles - Doubles	(Ireland) Willoughby Hamilton; 6-1, 6-1, 6-3	(Ireland) Arthur John de Courcy Wilson	(Ireland) Grainger Chaytor (Ireland) Blaney Hamilton	(Ireland) George Hewson (United Kingdom of Great Britain and Ireland) Chaloner Knox (Ireland) Effingham Carroll McDowell (Ireland) Joshua Pim
6 - 10 Aug.	West of Ireland Championships; County Sligo Lawn Tennis Club; Ardaghowen, Sligo, Ireland; Grass; Singles - Doubles	Challenger (England) Reginald Arthur Gamble		(Ireland) Grainger Chaytor (Ireland) Blaney Hamilton	(Ireland) George Hewson (United Kingdom of Great Britain and Ireland) Chaloner Knox (Ireland) Effingham Carroll McDowell (Ireland) Joshua Pim
12 August.	Gore Court Championships; Sittingbourne, Gore Court Archery and LTC; Gore Court, Sittingbourne, Great Britain; Outdoor; Grass; Singles	(United Kingdom) Ernest George Meers; 6-4,3-6, 6-3, 6-4	(United Kingdom) Wilberforce Eaves	(United Kingdom) Charles Gladstone Eames (United Kingdom of Great Britain and Ireland) Nevill Cobbold	(United Kingdom) Wilberforce Eaves (Ireland) David Grainger Chaytor (United Kingdom of Great Britain and Ireland) Ernest Lewis (United Kingdom) Frederick Thompson
8- 12 August.	Kilkenny County and City Tournament; Kilkenny County Lawn Tennis Club; Kilkenny, Ireland; Grass; Singles – Doubles	(Ireland) Grainger Chaytor; 8–6, 6–2, 6–2	(Ireland) Major Francis Slade-Gully		
10 - 12 August.	North of Wales Open; Pensarn LTC; Abergele, Conwy County Borough, North Wales; Grass; Singles - Doubles	(England) Mark Anthony Hartnell w.o.	(United Kingdom of Great Britain and Ireland) E. Draper	(England) Walter Reid Craig (United Kingdom of Great Britain and Ireland) F.C. Varey	(United Kingdom of Great Britain and Ireland) T.M. Draper (United Kingdom of Great Britain and Ireland) J.H. Marston (United Kingdom of Great Britain and Ireland) F.R. Oakley (United Kingdom of Great Britain and Ireland) H. Raphael
8–13 Aug.	Teignmouth and Shaldon Open; Teignmouth LTC; Teignmouth, Devon, England; Grass; Singles	(United Kingdom of Great Britain and Ireland) Ernest Wool Lewis; 7–5, 6–2|	(United Kingdom of Great Britain and Ireland) Wilfred Milne	(United Kingdom of Great Britain and Ireland) John Redfern Deykin (United Kingdom of Great Britain and Ireland) Robert Charles Thompson	(United Kingdom of Great Britain and Ireland) C.H. Davies (United Kingdom of Great Britain and Ireland) J. Hare (United Kingdom of Great Britain and Ireland) William R. Ormsby Hindle (United Kingdom of Great Britain and Ireland) W.A. Kindersley
10 – 13 August. (Note: The Hull Westbourne Avenue ran from 1884 to 1906.)	Hull Westbourne Avenue Tournament; Hull Westbourne Avenue Tennis Club; Kingston-Upon-Hull, England; Grass; Singles – Doubles	(United Kingdom of Great Britain and Ireland) Frederick Bradbury; 2–6, 8–6, 6–2	(United Kingdom of Great Britain and Ireland) L. Harrison		
10 – 16 August. (Note: Two events of the Southern California Championship were staged in 1887 the first in March the second in August.)	Southern California Championships, Riverside, California, US; Grass; Singles; Doubles	(United States) William H. Young; 6–4, 6–2, 6–0	(United States) R. L. Bettner		
11 – 13 August.	Englewood Open; Englewood Englewood, New Jersey, United States; Clay; Singles – Doubles	(United States) Oliver Samuel Campbell; 6–2 1–6 5–7 6–4 6–4	(United States) Augustus Duryee		
11 – 13 August. (Note: The East of England Championships ran from 1885 until 1981. Originally called the Felixstowe Annual Lawn Tennis Tournament its title changed to the East of England Championships in 1889. The Event is still staged today as a LTA British Tour (Premier Event) formally known as East of England)	East of England Championships; Felixstowe Lawn Tennis Club; Felixstowe, Suffolk, England; Grass; Singles – Doubles	(United Kingdom of Great Britain and Ireland) William Herbert Cohen; 6–3, 6–4	(United Kingdom of Great Britain and Ireland) Charles Sidney Cullingham		
11 - 13 August.	Penzance Open; Penzance LTC; Penzance, Cornwall, England; Outdoor; Grass; Singles - Doubles	(United States) A.K. Andrews. 6–2, 6–4	(United Kingdom of Great Britain and Ireland) E. Murray	(United Kingdom) W.A. Clarke (United Kingdom) J.N. Martin	(United Kingdom) Captain Alexander
11 - 13 August.	Penzance Open; Penzance LTC; Penzance, Cornwall, England; Outdoor; Grass; Singles - Doubles	(United Kingdom) W.A. Clarke (United Kingdom) E. Russell Rendle; 6-3 7-5	(United Kingdom) Mr. Whiting (United Kingdom) W.H. Chappel	(United Kingdom) W.A. Clarke (United Kingdom) J.N. Martin	(United Kingdom) Captain Alexander
11 - 13 August.	Penzance Open; Penzance LTC; Penzance, Cornwall, England; Outdoor; Grass; Singles - Doubles	(United Kingdom) W.A. Clarke (United Kingdom) Miss Childs; 6-2 6-2	(United Kingdom) Vernon Francis Page. (United Kingdom) Mrs. Lancelot Melvill Haslope	(United Kingdom) W.A. Clarke (United Kingdom) J.N. Martin	(United Kingdom) Captain Alexander
16 August.	Bar Harbor Open; Bar Harbor Club; Bar Harbor, Maine, US; Singles – Doubles	(United States) Robert Livingston Beeckman ?	(United States) ?		
17 – 19 August. (Note: The Niagara International Tournament ran from 1885 until 1923.)	Niagara International Tournament; Queen's Royal Hotel Court's; Niagara-on-the-Lake, Ontario, Canada; Grass; Singles – Doubles	(United States) E.C. Knight. 6–4, 6–1	(United States) S. Burrell		
15- 20 August.	County Kildare Open Tennis Championship; Lansdowne Lawn Tennis Club; Parsonstown, King's County Ireland; Grass; Singles – Doubles	(Ireland) Grainger Chaytor; 2 sets to 1	(Ireland) George Bloomfield Garvey		
15 - 20 Aug. (Note: This edition was held in cnjuction with the Yorkshire Association and County Open Tournament were staged in Whitby that year.)	Whitby Open Lawn Tennis Tournament; West Cliff Tennis Grounds; Whitby, North Yorkshire, England; Outdoor; Grass; Singles - Doubles	(United Kingdom of Great Britain and Ireland) E.W. Fletcher; 6-3, 7-5, 9-7	(United Kingdom of Great Britain and Ireland) George Richmond Mewburn	(United Kingdom of Great Britain and Ireland) Marmaduke Strickland Constable (United Kingdom of Great Britain and Ireland) John Parker Marsh	(United Kingdom of Great Britain and Ireland) L. Harrison (United Kingdom of Great Britain and Ireland) Francis Joseph Hirst (England) Arthur Godfrey Pease (United Kingdom of Great Britain and Ireland) M. Pole
15 -20 August.	Yorkshire Association and County Open Tournament; West Cliff Tennis Grounds; Whitby, England; Singles – Doubles	(United Kingdom of Great Britain and Ireland) E.W. Fletcher; 5–7 6–2 6–1 9–7	(England) Arthur G. Pease	(United Kingdom of Great Britain and Ireland) Frederick T. Bradbury (United Kingdom of Great Britain and Ireland) L. Harrison	(United Kingdom of Great Britain and Ireland) Marmaduke Strickland Constable (United Kingdom of Great Britain and Ireland) Arthur Edward Corner (United Kingdom of Great Britain and Ireland) Arthur Riley Crossley (United Kingdom of Great Britain and Ireland) Arthur Herbert Meysey-Thompson
15 – 20 August.	Torquay Lawn Tennis Tournament; Teignmouth Tennis Club; Torquay, England; Grass; Singles – Doubles	(United Kingdom of Great Britain and Ireland) Ernest Lewis; 7–5, 6–2, 7–5	(United Kingdom of Great Britain and Ireland) Wilfred Milne		
15 - 20 Aug.	Tenby Open; Tenby LTC; Tenby, Pembrokeshire, Wales; Outdoor; Grass; Singles - Doubles	(Wales) David Grismond Owen Saunder; 6-5 6-2 6-1	(United Kingdom of Great Britain and Ireland) Captain G.R. Taylor	(United Kingdom of Great Britain and Ireland) E.W. David (Wales) William Sidney Nelson Heard	(Wales) Henry Stafford Brenchley (United Kingdom of Great Britain and Ireland) A.G. Norris (United Kingdom of Great Britain and Ireland) P.W.E. Scott (United Kingdom of Great Britain and Ireland) A. Glover-Williams
15 - 20 Aug	South Wales and Monmouthshire Championships; Tenby LTC; Tenby, Pembrokeshire, Wales; Outdoor; Grass; Singles - Doubles	(Wales) William Sidney Nelson Heard; 6-0, 6–1, 6-1	(United Kingdom) A.G. Norris	(Wales) Henry Stafford Brenchley (Wales) W.L. Phillips	(England) W.T. Booker (Wales) W. Griffiths (Wales) G. Lewis (England) A.M.C. Smith
15 - 20 Aug	South Wales and Monmouthshire Championships; Tenby LTC; Tenby, Pembrokeshire, Wales; Outdoor; Grass; Singles - Doubles	Challenger (Wales) E.W. Davies		(Wales) Henry Stafford Brenchley (Wales) W.L. Phillips	(England) W.T. Booker (Wales) W. Griffiths (Wales) G. Lewis (England) A.M.C. Smith
16 – 24 August. (Note: The South of Scotland Championships were staged from 1882 to 1967.)	South of Scotland Championships; Moffat, Scotland; Grass; Singles – Doubles	(United Kingdom of Great Britain and Ireland) Archibald Thomson; 6–5 6–1 6–2	(United Kingdom of Great Britain and Ireland) Jacob G. Brown		
16 – 24 August.	Northern Counties Challenge Cup; Stockton-on-Tees, County Durham, England; Grass; Singles – Doubles	(United Kingdom of Great Britain and Ireland) Ernest W. Fletcher; 6–3, 3–6, 6–4	(United Kingdom of Great Britain and Ireland) Henry Bolckow		
22 Aug. (Note: The British Columbia Championships were staged from 1886 to 1976.)	British Columbia Challenge Cup; Victoria Lawn Tennis Club; Vancouver, BC, Canada; Grass; Singles; Doubles	(Canada) R.H. Handcock; 3-0 sets	(Canada) Brian Halsey Tyrwhitt-Drake	(Canada) Lieut. Hutchinson (Canada) E.M.W. Woods	(Canada) J. Fennelly (Canada) C.A. Holland (Canada) John Musgrave (Canada) W.A. Ward
22 Aug.	British Columbia Challenge Cup; Victoria Lawn Tennis Club; Vancouver, BC, Canada; Grass; Singles; Doubles	Challenger (Canada) Harvey Walter Henry Coombe		(Canada) Lieut. Hutchinson (Canada) E.M.W. Woods	(Canada) J. Fennelly (Canada) C.A. Holland (Canada) John Musgrave (Canada) W.A. Ward
19 – 21 August.	Norton Lawn Tennis Open Tournament; Norton Lawn Tennis Club; Durham, England; Grass; Singles – Doubles	(United Kingdom of Great Britain and Ireland) Arthur B. Crosby; 6–1, 6–5	(United Kingdom of Great Britain and Ireland) Henry Bolckow		
19 – 21 August.	Northwestern Championships; St Paul's Club; Saint Paul, Minnesota United States; Singles – Doubles	(United States) Samuel Thompson Chase ?	(United States) ?		
23 - 25 Aug.	Saxmundham Lawn Tennis Tournament; Saxmundham Lawn Tennis Club; Carlton Park, Saxmundham, England; Grass; Saxmundham Lawn Tennis Tournament – Doubles	(United Kingdom of Great Britain and Ireland) Benjamin Arthur Cohen; 3–6, 6–4, 6–2	(United Kingdom of Great Britain and Ireland) George Norman	(United Kingdom of Great Britain and Ireland) Harold (Harry) Bacon (United Kingdom of Great Britain and Ireland) Thomas Kensit Norman	(United Kingdom) Charles Sidney Cullingham (United Kingdom) Perry E. Hall (United Kingdom) Henry Arthur Lane (United Kingdom) Arthur Bacon Longe
25 August.	Meadow Club Amateur Closed Tournament; Meadow Club; Southampton, New York, US; Surface ? Singles – Doubles	(United States) C.P. Howland	(United States) ?		
24–26 Aug.	Devon and Cornwall Archery Society Lawn Tennis Tournament; Manadon, Plymouth, England; Grass; Singles - Doubles	(United Kingdom of Great Britain and Ireland) Dennis Fortescue Boles; 4-6 6-1 6-1	(United Kingdom of Great Britain and Ireland) Mr. Thompson	(United Kingdom of Great Britain and Ireland) F.W. Leeper (United Kingdom of Great Britain and Ireland) E.H.A. Tolcher	(United Kingdom of Great Britain and Ireland) G. Arundell (United Kingdom of Great Britain and Ireland) F. Birdwood (United Kingdom of Great Britain and Ireland) W.A.P. Matthews (United Kingdom of Great Britain and Ireland) Reginald John Hall Parlby
24 – 26 August.	Cambridgeshire Lawn Tennis Tournament; Exmouth Lawn Tennis Club; Exmouth, England; Singles – Doubles	(United Kingdom of Great Britain and Ireland) Hugh MacNaghten; 6–2, 6–0, 6–1	(United Kingdom of Great Britain and Ireland) Frederick Whitehead		
22 – 27 August. (Note: The North of England Championships were staged from 1886 to 1974.)	North of England Championships; Scarborough, North Yorkshire, England; Grass; Singles – Doubles	(Ireland) Ernest Browne; 7–5, 6–1, 6–3	(United Kingdom of Great Britain and Ireland) James Baldwin		
23 -27 August.	Hampshire Championships; Dean Park Cricket Ground; Bournemouth, England; Grass; Singles – Doubles	(United Kingdom of Great Britain and Ireland) Ernest Lewis; 6–2, 6–4, 6–3	(United Kingdom of Great Britain and Ireland) H. Phillip		
26–27 Aug.	Rothesay Lawn Tennis Tournament; Craigmore, Rothesay, Scotland; Singles – Doubles	(Ireland) James Edgar Lefroy Stein; 6–2, 6–0, 6–1	(United Kingdom of Great Britain and Ireland) J. Adam		
25–28 Aug	US National Championships; Newport; Grass; United States; Singles – Doubles	(United States) Richard Sears; 6–1, 6–3, 6–2	(United States) Henry Slocum		
25–28 Aug	US National Championships; Newport; Grass; United States; Singles – Doubles	(United States) Richard Sears (United States) James Dwight; 6–4, 3–6, 2–6, 6–3, 6–3	(United States) Howard Taylor (United States) Henry Slocum		

=== September ===
Date	Tournament	Winner	Finalist	Semi-finalist	Quarter-finalist
September.	Edgewood Country Club Open; Edgewood Country Club Tivoli, New York US; Clay; Singles – Doubles	(United States) Valentine Gill Hall			
September.	Hitchin Tennis Tournament; Hitchin, Hertfordshire, England; Grass; Singles – Doubles	(United States) Valentine Gill Hall ?			
1 – 3 Sept.	Devon and Cornwall Archery Society Lawn Tennis Tournament; Plymouth, England; Grass; Singles – Doubles	(United Kingdom of Great Britain and Ireland) Dennis Fortescue Boles; 4–6, 6–1, 6–1	(United Kingdom of Great Britain and Ireland) Mr. Thompson		
5 Sept. (Note: The East of Scotland Championships started 30 August and ended 5 September 1887. The tournament was staged from 1887 to 1978.)	East of Scotland Championships; United College Grounds; St Andrews, Scotland; Grass; Singles – Doubles	(Scotland) Alfred Aitken Thomson; 2–6, 3–6, 6–0, 6–4, 8–6	(United Kingdom of Great Britain and Ireland) A. Dunlop-Hill		(Scotland) George Kerr
6 Sept. (Note: The South of England Championships started 29 August and ended 6 September 1887.)	South of England Championships; Eastbourne Lawn Tennis Club; Eastbourne, England; Grass; Singles – Doubles	(United Kingdom of Great Britain and Ireland) Ernest Lewis; 8–6, 7–5, 6–4	(United Kingdom of Great Britain and Ireland) Herbert Wilberforce		
7 – 10 September.	Lenox Invitation; Lenox Lawn Tennis Club; Harlem, New York City, United States; Grass; Singles – Doubles	(United States) Joseph Sill Clark Sr. 6–1, 6–3, 2–6, 6–8, 7–5	(United States) Philip Shelton Sears		
9 September.	Staten Island Cricket and Baseball Club Amateur Closed; Livingston, New York, US; Grass –	(United States) G.A. Willis ?	(United States) ?		
5 – 12 September.	United Services Tennis Club Tournament; United Service Recreation Club, Portsmouth, Hampshire, England. Grass; Singles - Doubles	(Ireland) Wilfred L. Parker; 6-2 6-3	(United Kingdom of Great Britain and Ireland) L.G. Campbell	(United Kingdom of Great Britain and Ireland) Reginald Harry Noott (United Kingdom of Great Britain and Ireland) C.G. Thornhill	(United Kingdom of Great Britain and Ireland) Lionel James Easton (United Kingdom of Great Britain and Ireland) D. Fuller (United Kingdom of Great Britain and Ireland) Frederick Wentworth Gore (United Kingdom of Great Britain and Ireland) Edmund Henry Parker
10 – 13 Sept. (Note: Tennis Club Boulogne-sur-Mer was founded in 1885. In 1887 the club established a major international tournament.)	Boulogne International; Tennis Club Boulogne-sur-Mer; Boulogne-sur-Mer, France; Clay; Singles – Doubles	(United Kingdom of Great Britain and Ireland) William C. Taylor ?	?		
13 – 15 September.	Rochester Lawn Tennis Tournament; Rochester Lawn Tennis Club; Rochester, New York, US; Grass; Singles – Doubles	(United States) W.L. Kingsley ?	(United States) ?		
20 September.	New Hamburg Invitation; Poughkeepsie, New York, US; Surface? Singles – Doubles	(United States) Edward L. Hall ?			

=== October ===
Date	Tournament	Winner	Finalist	Semi-finalist	Quarter-finalist
26 Sept – 1 Oct.	Delaware Field Club Open; Delaware Field Club; Wilmington, Delaware, United States; Clay; Singles – Doubles	(United States) Charles Belmont Davis; 6–3, 6–4, 6–2	(United States) Marmaduke Smith		
1 – 3 October	Southern Championships; Wilmington, United States; Singles – Doubles	(United States) Charles Belmont Davis; 6–2 6–1 6–2	(United States) E. Porter		
12 – 14 October.	Intercollegiate Championships; New Haven LTC; New Haven, United States; Singles – Doubles	(United States) Philip Sears (Harvard College); 6–8, 6–2, 6–2	(United States) G.G. Shaw jr		
22 – 26 October.	Victorian Championships; Melbourne; Hard Asphalt; Singles – Doubles	(Australia) Arthur G. H. Colquhoun; 6–4, 6–2, 6–0	(Australia) Walter Timon Coldham		

=== November ===
Date	Tournament	Winner	Finalist	Semi-finalist	Quarter-finalist
2 – 7 November.	Punjab Lawn Tennis Championships; Lahore Gymkhana Club, Lawrence Hall Gardens; Lahore, India; Singles – Doubles	(United Kingdom) R.D. Spencer; 6–4, 6–2, 6–4	(United Kingdom) Edward Lee French		

=== December ===
Date	Tournament	Winner	Finalist	Semi-finalist	Quarter-finalist
December.	Royal South Yarra Lawn Tennis Club Tournament; Royal South Yarra LTC; Melbourne; Grass; Singles – Doubles	(Australia) John Dickson Cramond; 15 games to 5	(Australia) Robert Alexander Paxton		
22 – 26 October.	New Zealand Championships; Napier, New Zealand; Grass; Singles – Doubles	(New Zealand) Percival Clennell Fenwick; 6–2 6–0 6–4	(New Zealand) E.P. Hudson		

== Tournament winners ==
The list of winners by number of singles titles won:

- (United Kingdom) Ernest Wool Lewis—Bournemouth, Chiswick Park, Eastbourne, Hyde Park, Leicester, Stamford Bridge, Teignmouth, Torquay—(8)
- (United States) Henry Slocum—Harrison, Livingston, Nahant, New Haven, Wentworth—(5)
- (United Kingdom) Ernest W. Fletcher—Chapel Allerton, Ilkley, Stockton-on-Tees, Whitby—(4)
- (United Kingdom) Willoughby Hamilton—Dublin (Fitzwilliam), Dublin (Landsdowne), Howth, Sligo—(4)
- (United Kingdom) Ernest Browne—Cheltenham, Penarth, Scarborough—(3)
- (United Kingdom) Harry Grove—Northern Championships, Liverpool, Bath, Exmouth—(3)
- (United Kingdom) Patrick Bowes-Lyon—Dublin, Edinburgh, Newcastle upon Tyne—(3)
- (United States) Robert L. Beeckman—Bar Harbor, Eleberon, Hoboken—(3)
- (United Kingdom) Ernest George Meers—Leyton, Leyton (2nd), Sittingbourne—(3)
- (United States) Valentine Gill Hall—Hitchin, Poughkeepsie, Tivoli–(3)
- (United Kingdom) Charles Gladstone Eames—Rochester, Stevenage—(2)
- (United Kingdom) Grainger Chaytor—Kilkenny, Parsonstown—(2)
- (United Kingdom) Frank Seymour Noon—Stafford, Stafford II –(2)
- (United Kingdom) Frederick William Snook—Nottingham, Nottingham (2nd) –(2)
- (United States) Henry Augustus Taylor–Stenton, Southampton—(2)
- (New Zealand) Percival Clennell Fenwick—Napier, Napier (2nd) –(2)
- (United Kingdom) Ernest Renshaw–Irish Championships, Dublin–(1)
- (United Kingdom) Herbert Lawford-Wimbledon, (1)
- (United States) James Dwight–Leamington Spa, (1)
- (United Kingdom) Manliffe Goodbody–Dublin III, (1)
- (United States) Richard Sears–U.S. National Championships–(1)

== Sources ==
- A. Wallis Myers, ed. (1903). Lawn Tennis at Home and Abroad (1st ed.). New York: Charles Scribner's Sons. OCLC 5358651.
- Baily's Monthly Magazine of Sports and Pastimes, and Racing Register, A.H. Baily & Company of Cornhill. London. England. July 1887
- Gillmeister, Heiner (1998). Tennis:Cultural History. London: A&C Black. ISBN 9780718501952.
- Hall, Valentine Gill (1889). Lawn tennis in America. Biographical sketches of all the prominent players, knotty points, and all the latest rules and directions governing handicaps, umpires, and rules for playing. D. W. Granbery & Co. New York, NY, USA:
- Lake, Robert J. (2014). A Social History of Tennis in Britain: Volume 5 of Routledge Research in Sports History. Routledge:. ISBN 9781134445578.
- Mazak, Karoly (2017). The Concise History of Tennis. Independently published. ISBN 9781549746475.
- Nauright, John; Parrish, Charles (2012). Sports Around the World: History, Culture, and Practice. Santa Barbara, Calif.: ABC-CLIO. ISBN 9781598843002.
- Nieuwland, Alex (2009–2017). "Tournaments – Search for Tournament – Year – 1887". www.tennisarchives.com. Harlingen, Netherlands: Idzznew BV.
- Paret, Jahial Parmly; Allen, J. P.; Alexander, Frederick B.; Hardy, Samuel [from old catalogue (1918). Spalding's tennis annual . New York, NY, USA: New York, American sports publishing company.
- The Australian Dictionary of Biography (1966–2021). Including a supplementary volume of ‘missing persons’ have, so far, been published. Volumes 1–19. The National Centre of Biography. Australian National University. Canberra. Australia.
- The John Player Nottingham Tennis Tournament: Record of Winners Nottingham Lawn Tennis Tournament (1887–1970)" (PDF).https://www.nottinghamcastleltc.co.uk/history/?d=John+Player+Nottingham+Tennis+Tournament+1971.pdf. Nottingham Castle LTC. Notts Lawn Tennis Association. 7 June 1971. pp. 1–7.
