= 1887 in tennis =

This page covers all the important events in the sport of tennis in 1887. It provides the results of notable tournaments throughout the year on both the men's and women's ILTF tennis circuits.

== Wimbledon ==
| Category | Champion(s) | Finalist(s) | Score |
|---|---|---|---|
| Men's singles | (United Kingdom) Herbert Lawford | (United Kingdom) Ernest Renshaw | 1–6, 6–3, 3–6, 6–4, 6–4 |
| Women's singles | (United Kingdom) Lottie Dod | (United Kingdom) Blanche Bingley | 6–2, 6–0 |
| Men's doubles | (United Kingdom) Patrick Bowes-Lyon (United Kingdom) Herbert Wilberforce | (United Kingdom) Edward Barratt-Smith (United Kingdom) James Herbert Crispe | 6–3, 6–3, 6–2 |

== US Open ==
| Category | Champion(s) | Finalist(s) | Score |
|---|---|---|---|
| Men's singles | (United States) Richard Sears | (United States) Henry Slocum | 6–1, 6–3, 6–2 |
| Women's singles | (United States) Ellen Hansell | (United States) Laura Knight | 6–1, 6–0 |
| Men's doubles | (United States) Richard Sears (United States) James Dwight | (United States) Howard Taylor (United States) Henry Slocum | 6–4, 3–6, 2–6, 6–3, 6–3 |
