= Edith Cole (tennis) =

English tennis player

- Full name: Edith Mary Hutchinson Cole
- Country (sports): GBR
- Born: 10 September 1862 Hove, Sussex, England
- Died: 22 October 1945 (age 77) Hove, Sussex, England
- Turned pro: 1881 (amateur tour)
- Retired: 1891

Singles
- Career titles: 6

Grand Slam singles results
- Wimbledon: F (1887)

Edith Mary Hutchinson Cole (10 September 1862 - 22 October 1945) née Edith Coleridge also known as Edith Coleridge Cole was an English tennis player of the late 19th century. She won the singles at the prestigious Northern Championships in Manchester in 1883, and was also an All Comers' finalist at the Wimbledon Championships in 1887.

== Career ==
She was born Edith Coleridge the daughter of Major W Coleridge (1826–1902). She married Charles John Cole, in Hove, East Sussex, England on 16 April 1884. In major tournaments she competed at the first Wimbledon Championships for women in 1884 and again in 1887 and 1890.

In October 1881 she won the Sussex County Lawn Tennis Tournament on the Hove Rink Tennis Courts, at Hove against Leila Lodwick in three sets, she then won the Brighton Lawn Tennis Club Tournament. In May 1882 she successfully defended the singles title at the Brighton Lawn Tennis Club Tournament against an Eva Adshead, and also won the mixed doubles title partnering Robert Braddell. Then in October she also won the Sussex County Lawn Tennis Tournament defeating Florence Kemmis.

In 1883 she won the prestigious Northern Championships title held at the Northern Lawn Tennis Club, Manchester defeating Miss Eckersley in straight sets. In June 1884 she played at London Athletic Club Open Tournament (today called the Queen's Club Championships) where she reached the final before losing to Maud watson in four sets. Later at the Wimbledon Championships, but she exited early in the first round going out to Blanche Bingley.

In 1887 she was finalist at the Wimbledon Championships she advanced to the semi finals where she beat Maud Shackle in straight sets. She then faced Lottie Dod in the all commers final but lost to her straight sets. In August she won the Saxmundham LTC Tournament in against Alice Parr, and she was a finalist at South of England Championships in September at Devonshire Park, Eastbourne, where she lost to Ireland's May Langrishe in straight sets. In 1890 she competed at Wimbledon Championships for the final time where she reached the semi finals before losing May Jacks in straight sets.

== Grand Slam finals ==
=== Singles (0 title, 1 runners-up) ===
Result	Date	Tournament	Surface	Opponent	Score
Loss	1887	Wimbledon Championships	Grass	(United Kingdom of Great Britain and Ireland) Lottie Dod	2–6, 3–6.

== Career finals ==
=== Singles (9), titles (6), runners up (3) ===
(*) Denotes All-Comers final (w.o.) denotes walkover.

Category + (Titles)
Major (1)
National ()
Regular (5)

Titles by Surface
Clay – Outdoor (0)
Grass – Outdoor (6)
Hard – Outdoor (0)
Unknown – Outdoor (0)
Carpet – Indoor (0)
Wood – Indoor (0)

No	Result	Date	Tournament	Surface	Opponent	Score
1.	Win	1-Oct-1881	Sussex County Lawn Tennis Tournament	Grass	(England) Leila Lodwick	6–5, 6–2
2.	Win	8-Oct-1881	Brighton Lawn Tennis Club Tournament	Grass	(United Kingdom) Eva Adshead	6–5, 4–6, 6–2
3.	Win	27-May-1882	Brighton Lawn Tennis Club Tournament	Grass	(United Kingdom) Eva Adshead	6–1, 6–3, 6–0
4.	Win	2-Oct-1882	Sussex County Lawn Tennis Tournament	Grass	(United Kingdom) Florence Kemmis	5–6, 6–5, 6–2
5.	Win	30-Jun-1883	Northern Championships	Grass	(United Kingdom) Miss Eckersley	7–5, 6–3
2.	Loss	21‑Jun‑1884	London Athletic Club Open Tournament	Grass	(England) Maud Watson	4–6, 2–6, 6–2, 1–6
1.	Loss	7‑Jul‑1887	Wimbledon Championships *	Grass	(United Kingdom) Lottie Dod	2–6, 3–6.
6.	Win	12‑Aug‑1890	Saxmundham LTC Tournament	Grass	(England) Alice Parr	6–4, 6–2
3.	Loss	19‑Sep‑1890	South of England Championships	Grass	(Ireland) May Langrishe	3–6, 2–6
