= Ojai Tennis Tournament =

Annual tennis tournament in California, US

Tournament information
- Sponsor: The Ojai Valley Tennis Club
- Founded: 1896; 129 years ago
- Location: Ojai, California; United States
- Venue: Libbey Park and other locations
- Surface: Hard
- Website: The Ojai

The Ojai Tennis Tournament, often shortened to The Ojai, is an annual tennis tournament in Ventura County, California, headquartered at Libbey Park in downtown Ojai, about 80 miles (130 km) north of Los Angeles. The event, first held in 1896, is the oldest and largest amateur tennis tournament in the United States held in one location.

== Overview ==
The Ojai Tennis Tournament is one of North America’s largest amateur tennis tournaments, with 1,500 tennis players, up from the 12 players in the initial tournament in 1896 and 500 entrants in 1949. The tournament is played over several days throughout the Ojai Valley and elsewhere in western Ventura County, with final matches and marquee events held at Libbey Park in Ojai. Venues include parks, schools, private clubs, hotels, and even private residences.

As of 2021, the event features 27 divisions, including men's and women's open divisions and several dedicated to collegiate and youth players. The Pac-12 Conference conducts its team championships at The Ojai, and the California Community College Athletic Association additionally crowns singles and doubles champions. The Ojai also features CIF Southern Section high school boys' singles and doubles competition, as the tournament falls within the association's boys' tennis season. Other divisions include NCAA Division III athletes, men's independent college players (i.e., from non-Pac-12 four-year institutions), and juniors.

== History ==
The Ojai Tennis Tournament can trace its beginnings to 1887, when Sherman Day Thacher arrived in the Ojai Valley to pursue citrus farming. To raise funds for his enterprise, he started tutoring students on his 160-acre (65 ha) ranch known as Casa de Piedra. With the later arrival of his brother William Thacher, a collegiate tennis champion at Yale, the ranch became home to the valley's first tennis court in 1892 and hosted Ojai's first tennis tournament the following year. (Casa de Piedra evolved into The Thacher School, the oldest boarding school in California still in operation.) William Thacher established the Ojai Valley Tennis Club in 1895. The inaugural Ojai Tennis Tournament matched the Ojai Valley and Ventura tennis clubs, with the pool of eligible entrants later expanding to include neighboring counties and eventually all of California. By 1912, it was the largest amateur tennis tournament in the US with 272 competitors in 12 events.

The Ojai was forced to move to the YMCA courts in Los Angeles because of World War I and two big fires in 1918, and to Santa Barbara in 1919.

In 1922, tournament entrance fees were $1 ($19 in current dollar terms), and grounds admission (including afternoon tea) was $.50 ($9 in current dollar terms) on the first day and $.75 ($14 in current dollar terms) on the last day. In 1924, an outbreak of a cattle disease called hoof-and-mouth disease led to a halt to travel, and the consequent cancellation of the tournament.

In 2018, for the first time its history, the Ojai Tennis Tournament offered equal prize money to men and women in its Open divisions.

The Ojai Tennis Tournament has been canceled seven times since its inception. In addition to its 1924 cancellation, the tournament was not held from 1943 to 1946 because of World War II. The Ojai was again canceled in 2020 and 2021 due to the COVID-19 pandemic.

Notable participants in the Ojai Tennis Tournament include May Sutton, Bill Tilden, Helen Wills, Tony Trabert, Bobby Riggs, Jack Kramer, Billie Jean King, Allen Fox, Arthur Ashe, Stan Smith, Jimmy Connors, Tracy Austin, Lindsay Davenport, Pete Sampras, Michael Chang, Mackenzie McDonald, and the Bryan twins.
