= 1887 Wimbledon Championships – Men's singles =

Men's singles
- 1887 Wimbledon Championships

Final
- Champion: (United Kingdom) Herbert Lawford
- Runner-up: (United Kingdom) Ernest Renshaw
- Score: 6–2, 6–3, 2–6, 4–6, 6–4

Details
- Draw: 16
- Seeds: –

Events
Singles	men	women
Doubles	men	women
- Wimbledon Championships

Herbert Lawford defeated Ernest Renshaw 6–2, 6–3, 2–6, 4–6, 6–4 in the all comers' final to win the gentlemen's singles tennis title at the 1887 Wimbledon Championships. The reigning champion William Renshaw was unable to defend his title due to a tennis elbow.

== Draw ==
Key

- Q = Qualifier
- WC = Wild card
- LL = Lucky loser
- Alt = Alternate
- ITF = ITF entry
- PR = Protected ranking
- SR = Special ranking
- SE = Special exempt
- JE = Junior exempt
- JR = Junior Accelerator Programme entrant
- CO = College Accelerator Programme entrant
- NG = Next Gen Accelerator Program entrant
- w/o = Walkover
- r = Retired
- d = Defaulted

=== All Comers' ===
First round
(United Kingdom) Herbert Bowes-Lyon	6	6	0
(United Kingdom) MG MacNamara	2	4	0^{r}
(United Kingdom) Harry Grove	6	6	6
(United Kingdom) Herbert Wilberforce	1	3	3
(United Kingdom) Herbert Lawford	6	9	6
(United Kingdom) Harry Barlow	0	7	3
(United Kingdom) Oswald Milne	5	6	1	6	8
(United Kingdom) EV Thompson	7	4	6	4	6
(United Kingdom) Ernest Renshaw	6	6	6
(United Kingdom) Patrick Bowes-Lyon	1	0	0
(United Kingdom) Ernest Lewis	6	6	6
(United Kingdom) FA Bowlby	2	2	1
(United Kingdom) Wilfred Milne
(United Kingdom) George Montgomerie	^{w/o}
(United Kingdom) Charles Lacy Sweet	6	6	4	6
(United Kingdom) William Taylor	2	2	6	1

Quarterfinals
(United Kingdom) Herbert Bowes-Lyon	3	2	8
(United Kingdom) Harry Grove	6	6	10
(United Kingdom) Herbert Lawford	7	6	6
(United Kingdom) Oswald Milne	5	0	3
(United Kingdom) Ernest Renshaw	7	6	6
(United Kingdom) Ernest Lewis	5	2	4
(United Kingdom) Wilfred Milne	3	1	3
(United Kingdom) Charles Lacy Sweet	6	6	6

Semifinals
(United Kingdom) Harry Grove	6	3	5	5
(United Kingdom) Herbert Lawford	4	6	7	7
(United Kingdom) Ernest Renshaw
(United Kingdom) Charles Lacy Sweet	w/o

Final
(United Kingdom) Herbert Lawford	1	6	3	6	6
(United Kingdom) Ernest Renshaw	6	3	6	4	4

Preceded by 1886 U.S. National Championships – Singles	Grand Slam men's singles	Succeeded by 1888 U.S. National Championships – Men's singles
