= Scarlet Ribbon Amateur Tournament =

Defunct tennis tournament
- Founded: 1885; 140 years ago
- Abolished: 1886; 139 years ago
- Location: Chicago, Illinois, United States
- Venue: Scarlet Ribbon Lawn Tennis Club
- Surface: Grass

The Scarlet Ribbon Amateur Tournament was a late 19th-century men's grass court tennis tournament held at the Scarlet Ribbon Lawn Tennis Club, Stenton, Chicago, Illinois, United States from 1885 to 1886. The tournament was played at until 1886.

== History ==
Scarlet Ribbon Lawn Tennis Club was founded in the early 1880s. In 1885 the club established the Scarlet Ribbon Amateur Tournament. The tournament continued to be held annually through until 1886 when it was discontinued.

== Finals ==
=== Men's Singles ===
Year	Winner	Finalist	Score
1885	(United States) J.W. Corwith	(United States) Charles Amherst Chase	def.
1886	(United States) Charles Amherst Chase	(United States) Henry Slocum	2–6, 6–3, 6–3, 6–4.

=== Men's Doubles ===
Year	Winner	Finalist	Score
1885	(United States) E.S. Baumann (United States) Samuel T Chase	(United States) ? (United States) ?	won.
1886	(United States) Charles Amherst Chase (United States) Samuel T Chase	(United States) Godfrey Brinley (United States) Henry Slocum	def.
