= Wellesley Open =

Defunct tennis tournament
- Tour: USNLTA Circuit
- Founded: 1888
- Abolished: 1888
- Editions: 1
- Location: Wellesley, Norfolk County, Massachusetts, United States
- Venue: Ridge Hill Farm

The Wellesley Open was a grass court tennis tournament staged for one edition only from July 10 to 13 1888. It was played at Ridge Hill Farm in Wellesley, Norfolk County, Massachusetts, United States.

The event was part of the USNLTA Circuit for that season only.

== History ==
The tournament was organized by Fred Hovey then president of the Wellesley Lawn Tennis Club.

The tournament featured a 20 man draw for the singles, 10 pairs for the men's doubles. It included players such as Fred S. Mansfield, Fred Hovey who also played, Henry Ditson of the sports company Wright & Ditson, Edward Peale MacMullen and Henry Bixby.

== Finals ==
=== Singles ===
Year	Winners	Runners up	Score
1888	(United States) Philip Sears	(United States) Arthur Williston	4-6, 3-6, 6-2, 6-2, 6-2.

== Sources ==
- Tennis Archives Tournament: Wellesley. https://www.tennisarchives.com/tournament/.
