= Nahant Invitation =

Defunct tennis tournament
- Founded: 1885; 140 years ago
- Abolished: 1904; 121 years ago
- Location: Nahant, Massachusetts, United States
- Venue: Nahant Club
- Surface: Clay

The Nahant Invitation was an invitational men's clay court tournament established in 1885 at the Nahant Club, Nahant, Massachusetts, United States, that ran till 1904.

== History ==
The Nahant Invitation was a clay court tournament established in 1885 at the Nahant Club, Nahant, Massachusetts, United States, In 1886 the event was played in a round robin format with six players Howard Augustus Taylor won all six of his matches with no defeats, second placed was Henry Slocum played six won five lost one. In 1887 it was a round robin format again with Charles Amherst Chase played five won five no defeats, second was Philip Shelton Sears played five won four lost one. The same format continued until 1892. The tournament was held through to 1904.

== Finals ==
=== Men's Singles ===
Year	Winner	Runner-up	Score
1885	(United States) Joseph Sill Clark Sr.	(United States) Oliver Samuel Campbell	6-3, 6-2, 6-3.
1886	(United States) Howard Augustus Taylor	(United States) Joseph Sill Clark Sr.	6-4, 6-4, 6-4.
1887	(United States) Henry Slocum	(United States) Henry Slocum	RR.
1888	(United States) Charles Amherst Chase	(United States) Philip Shelton Sears	RR.
1889	(United States) Charles Amherst Chase	(United States) Edward Ludlow Hall	RR.
1890	(United States) Oliver Samuel Campbell	(United States) Bob Huntington	RR.
1891	(United States) Clarence Hobart	(United States) Bob Huntington	RR.
1892	(United States) Edward Ludlow Hall	(United States) Malcolm Greene Chace	RR.
1903	(United Kingdom) Laurie Doherty	(United States) William Jackson Clothier	6–4, 6–0.
1904	(United States) William Jackson Clothier	(United States) William Larned	7–5, 6–4, 2–6, 6–3.

== Venue ==
The tournament was played on the courts of the Nahant Club.
