= Lanarkshire Open Tennis Championships =

Lanarkshire Championships

Defunct tennis tournament
- Tour: ILTF Circuit (1913-1967); Scottish LTA Circuit (1968-1999)
- Founded: 1886; 140 years ago
- Abolished: 1999; 27 years ago
- Location: Hamilton, Lanarkshire, Scotland
- Venue: Hamilton Lawn Tennis Club
- Surface: Clay

The Lanarkshire Open Tennis Championships also known simply as the Lanarkshire Championships was a men's and women's grass court tennis tournament founded in 1886 as the Championship of Lanarkshire It was first played at Hamilton Lawn Tennis Club, Hamilton, Lanarkshire, Scotland. The championships were part of the ILTF Circuit through till 1967. After which it became part of the Scottish LTA Circuit until 1999 when it was discontinued.

== History ==
In 1884 Hamilton Lawn Tennis Club was founded, and is the third oldest tennis club in Scotland. In 1886 the club established the Championship of Lanarkshire tournament. The championships were not held during World War I and again during World War II.

The championships were part of the ILTF Circuit through till 1967. After which it became part of the Scottish LTA Circuit. In 1990 the company Viking Sports took over sponsorship of the event, and the tournament was branded as the Viking Sports Lanarkshire Open Tennis Championships until 1999 when it was discontinued.

The tournament was staged in various locations including, Hamilton, Motherwell and Wishaw.
