= Lenox Invitation =

Defunct tennis tournament
- Founded: 1883; 142 years ago
- Abolished: 1930; 95 years ago
- Editions: ?
- Location: Harlem, New York City, United States
- Venue: Lenox Lawn Tennis Club
- Surface: Grass

The Lenox Invitation also known as the Lenox Invitation Tennis Tournament was a men's invitational tennis tournament played at the Lenox Lawn Tennis Club, Harlem, New York City, United States on grass courts. The first tournament ran from 1883 until 1930 then was abolished.

== History ==
The Lenox Invitation was a men's invitational tennis tournament played at the Lenox Lawn Tennis Club, 123rd Street, Manhattan Avenue, Harlem, New York City, United States on grass courts. The first tournament ran from 1883 until 1930 then was abolished.

== Finals ==
=== Men's singles ===
Incomplete Roll

Lenox Invitation
| Year | Winners | Runners-up | Score |
| 1883 | (United States) Alexander Van Rensselaer | (United States) Harry Farnum | 6–2, 0–6, 6–4, 8–6. |
| 1884 | (United States) Walter Van Rensselaer Berry | (United States) Philip Sears | 6–3, 7–5, 6–3. |
| 1885 | (United States) Walter Van Rensselaer Berry (2) | (United States) Robert Livingston Beeckman | 6–3, 0–6, 8–6. |
| 1886 | (United States) Robert Livingston Beeckman | (United States) Henry Warner Slocum Jr. | 6–3, 0–6, 8–6. |
| 1887 | (United States) Joseph Sill Clark Sr. | (United States) Philip Shelton Sears | 6–1, 6–3, 2–6, 6–8, 7–5. |
| 1888 | (United States) Quincy Adams Shaw Jr. | (United Kingdom) William Edward Glyn | 5–7, 6–0, 8–6, 6–2. |
| 1889 | (United States) Bob Huntington | (United States) Charles A. Chase | 6–3, 6–3, 6–4. |
| 1890 | (United States) Philip Sears | (United States) Oliver Campbell | Won.? |
| 1899 | (United States) John Appleton Allen | (United States) Jahial Parmly Paret | 6–2, 6–3, 2–6, 6–3. |
| 1900 | (United States) Roche Goosen | (United States) George Lorraine Wyeth | 6–2, 6–2, 6–4. |
