= Devon and Cornwall Archery Society Lawn Tennis Tournament =

Defunct tennis tournament
- Founded: 1880; 145 years ago
- Abolished: 1887; 138 years ago
- Location: Manadon, Plymouth, Devon, England
- Venue: Devon and Cornwall Archery Society Grounds
- Surface: Grass

The Devon and Cornwall Archery Society Lawn Tennis Tournament was a men's and women's late Victorian era grass court tennis event established in June, 1880 that ran until 1887. The tournament was organised by the Devon and Cornwall Archery Society and Lawn Tennis Club, and held on the club grounds at Manadon, Plymouth, Devon, England.

== History ==
The Devon and Cornwall Archery Society Lawn tennis Tournament was Victorian period annual men's and women's grass court event established in June 1880 at Manadon, Plymouth, Devon, England. The tournament was staged until August 1887, when it was abolished.
