= Charles A. Chase =

American tennis player

- Country (sports): United States
- Born: January 10, 1864; Lake View, Chicago, Illinois
- Died: January 27, 1937 (aged 73); Superior, Wisconsin
- Turned pro: 1885 (amateur tour)
- Retired: 1890
- Plays: Right-handed (one-handed backhand)
- College: Amherst College

Singles
- Career record: 50–14
- Career titles: 12

Grand Slam singles results
- US Open: SF (1886)

Charles Amherst Chase (January 10, 1864 – January 27, 1937) was an American tennis player then later a lawyer and banker active in the late 19th century. He was active from 1885 to 1890 and contested 13 career finals winning 12 singles titles.

== Tennis career ==
Chase was initially a top-notch baseball player at one point, catching pitches from the great Bob Caruthers, but gave it up to pursue tennis. He did not start playing the game until age 16, when he first saw a tennis outfit. He had never heard of the sport, but he and his brothers learned to play.

He was noticeably slight in his build, weighing only 110 pounds (50 kg). In 1885 at the national Intercollegiate Championships playing at his first tournament he took second place, losing the final to Wallace P. Knapp of Yale. Chase reached the semifinals of the U.S. National Championships in 1886, and the quarterfinals in 1889 and 1890. In 1886 he won his first singles title at the Scarlet Ribbon Amateur Tournament defeating Henry Slocum in the final.

In 1887 he won his first of four Western States Championships titles. In 1888 he won the Rochester Lawn Tennis Tournament at Rochester, New York, the same year he also won the Newcastle Wright & Ditson Open Tournament and the Northwestern Championships.

His other career singles highlights include winning the Nahant Invitation two times in 1888 and 1889, the Rochester Lawn Tennis Tournament in 1888 and the Springfield Open the same season. He was also a losing finalist at the Lenox Invitation in 1889 against Bob Huntington. In 1890 he won his final singles title at the Western States Championships against John Ryerson. In 1909 he played his final tournament at the Massachusetts State Championships.

== Family and work ==
A native of Chicago, he was the son of lawyer Samuel Blanchard Chase and Emma Thompson Chase, and the grandson of Milwaukee Mayor Horace Chase. He was named after his maternal grandfather, Amherst Thompson. He attended Lake View High School, Amherst College in Massachusetts and Northwestern University Law School in Illinois.

He moved to Superior, Wisconsin, in 1893, and married Nelly Green the next year. After practicing law in Chicago, he became a prominent banker in Superior, where he was president of the Bank of Commerce for 30 years.

He was also very fond of golf, and was credited with introducing the sport to Superior, where he first played in vacant lots. He died in 1937.
