= Elberon Casino Invitation =

Defunct tennis tournament
- Founded: 1887; 138 years ago
- Abolished: 1888; 137 years ago
- Location: Elberon, Monmouth County, New Jersey, United States
- Venue: Elberon Casinio (1887–1888)
- Surface: Grass

The Elberon Casino Invitation was an early men's tennis tournament founded in 1887 as the Elberon Lawn Tennis Club Open and played in the Elberon section of Long Branch, in Monmouth County, New Jersey, United States, until 1888.

== History ==
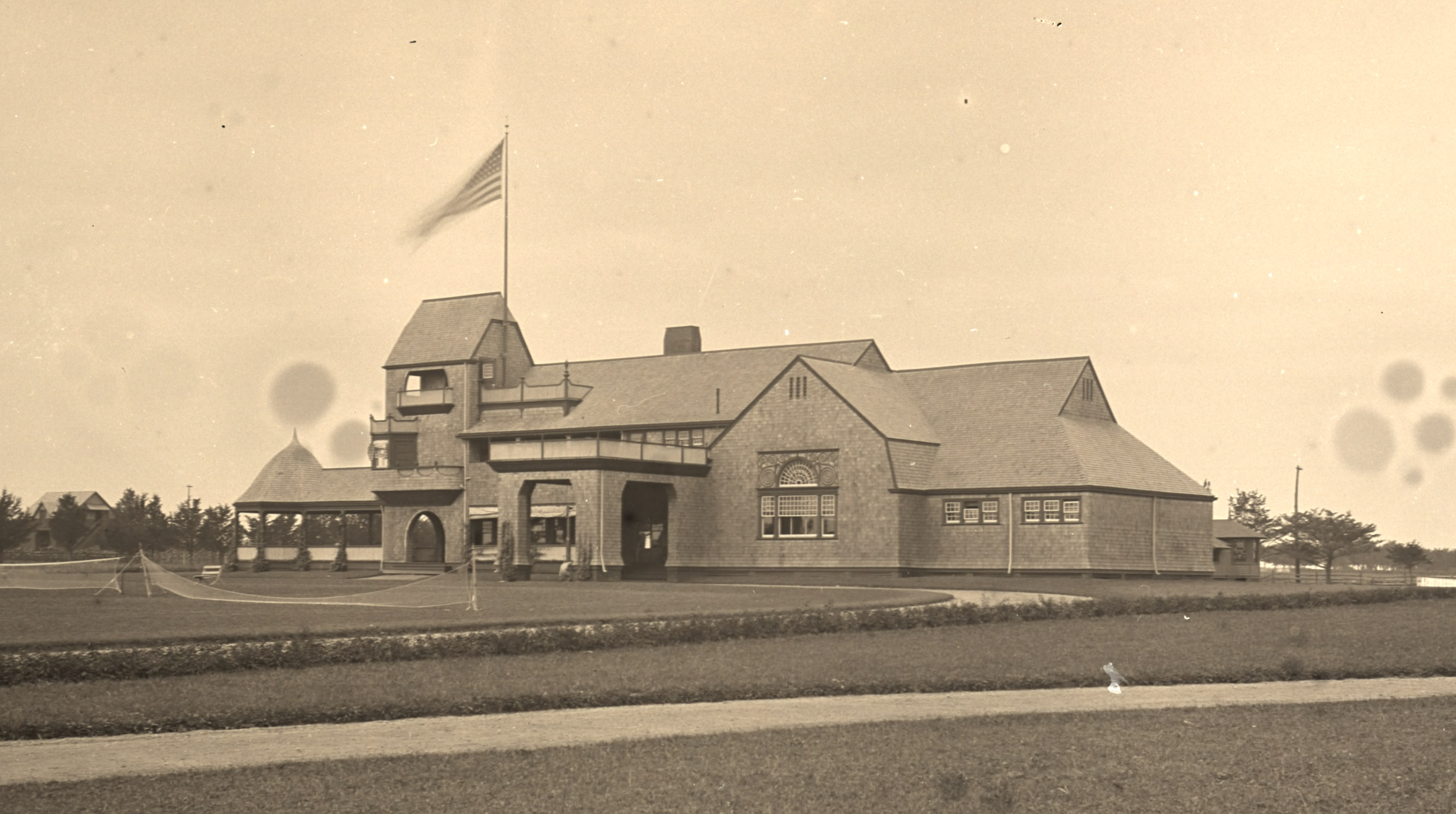
Elberon Casino circa 1900s, the grass tennis courts are visible in front of the building

In 1887 the Elberon Lawn Tennis Club organized an open men's tennis tournament staged at the Elberon Casino that was won by Robert Livingston Beeckman who defeated Howard Augustus Taylor. In 1888 the tournament was renamed as the Elberon Casino Invitation. The final event was won by Oliver Samuel Campbell.

The tournament featured the 1886 finalist from the U.S. National Championships, the 1887 men's champion and a future men's champion in 1890.

The Elberon Casino was built by Peabody and Stearns in 1883 as a private man's club that had 4 grass tennis courts, the casino lasted until 1959 when it was demolished.
