= 1887 Wimbledon Championships – Women's singles =

Women's singles
- 1887 Wimbledon Championships

Final
- Champion: (United Kingdom) Lottie Dod
- Runner-up: (United Kingdom) Blanche Bingley
- Score: 6–2, 6-0

Details
- Draw: 6
- Seeds: –

Events
Singles	men	women
Doubles	men	women
- Wimbledon Championships

15 year-old Lottie Dod defeated Edith Cole 6–2, 6–3 in the All Comers' Final, and then defeated the reigning champion Blanche Bingley 6–2, 6–0 in the challenge round to win the ladies' singles tennis title at the 1887 Wimbledon Championships. Dod, at 15 years, 285 days remains the youngest Grand Slam singles winner, male or female, in the history of tennis.

== Draw ==
Key

- Q = Qualifier
- WC = Wild card
- LL = Lucky loser
- Alt = Alternate
- ITF = ITF entry
- PR = Protected ranking
- SR = Special ranking
- SE = Special exempt
- JE = Junior exempt
- JR = Junior Accelerator Programme entrant
- CO = College Accelerator Programme entrant
- NG = Next Gen Accelerator Program entrant
- w/o = Walkover
- r = Retired
- d = Defaulted

=== Challenge round ===
Challenge Round
(United Kingdom) Lottie Dod	6	6
(United Kingdom) Blanche Bingley	2	0

=== All Comers' ===
Quarterfinals
(United Kingdom) B James	8	6
(United Kingdom) Maud Shackle	6	2

Semifinals
(United Kingdom) Lottie Dod	6	6
(United Kingdom) B James	1	1
(United Kingdom) Edith Cole	6	6
(United Kingdom) J Shackle	4	1

Final
(United Kingdom) Lottie Dod	6	6
(United Kingdom) Edith Cole	2	3

Preceded by 1886 Wimbledon Championships – Women's singles	Grand Slam women's singles	Succeeded by 1887 U.S. National Championships – Women's singles
