= Brighton Lawn Tennis Club Tournament =

Defunct tennis tournament
- Founded: 1880
- Abolished: 1885
- Editions: 5
- Location: Brighton Lawn Tennis Club; Brighton; Sussex; Great Britain
- Surface: outdoor (Grass)

The Brighton Lawn Tennis Club Tournament was an early men's tennis tournament held from 1880 through 1885.

== History ==
The Brighton Lawn Tennis Club Tournament was established in 1880. In 1882, it became an open event for men and women called the Brighton Lawn Tennis Club Tournament Open was a brief pre-open era tennis tournament played on outdoor grass courts at Brighton and Hove, England there was just three editions of this event two time U.S. National Champion James Dwight won the final edition in 1885.

== Finals ==
Incomplete list of tournaments included:

=== Men's singles ===
Year	Champion	Runner-up	Score
1880	(United Kingdom of Great Britain and Ireland) H. Stanley	(United Kingdom of Great Britain and Ireland) F.H. Izard	6–4, 6–3, 6–5.
1881	(United Kingdom of Great Britain and Ireland) C. Fairfax	(United Kingdom of Great Britain and Ireland) A.O. Jennings	6–1, 6–4, 7–5.
1882 (Note: 1882 results listed in the Field Lawn Tennis Calendar, ed. Evelegh. B.C.)	(United Kingdom of Great Britain and Ireland) A.A. Fuller	(United Kingdom of Great Britain and Ireland) C.G. Newton	6–4 6–2.
1883 (Note: 1883 results listed in the Pastime Magazine)	(United Kingdom of Great Britain and Ireland) A.O. Jennings	(United Kingdom of Great Britain and Ireland) Leonard Dampier	6–2 6–1 6–1.
1885 (Note: 1885 results listed in the Pastime Magazine)	(United States) James Dwight	(United Kingdom of Great Britain and Ireland) Charles Hoadley Ashe Ross	7–5 6–3 7–5.
