= Rochester Lawn Tennis Tournament =

Defunct tennis tournament
- Founded: 1886; 140 years ago
- Abolished: 1896; 130 years ago
- Location: Rochester, New York, United States
- Venue: Rochester Lawn Club
- Surface: Grass

The Rochester Lawn Tennis Tournament was a late-19th-century men's grass court tennis tournament founded in 1886. The tournament was organised by the Rochester Lawn Club and was first staged at the Rochester, New York, United States. The tournament ran annually until 1896 when it was discontinued.

== History ==
In 1886 the Rochester Lawn Club was established. The same year a new annual lawn tournament was established, and the winner of the inaugural singles event was the finalist at the 1885 U.S. National Championships, Godfrey Brinley. In 1888 the event was by won one of the semi-finalists from the 1886 U.S. National Championships, Charles Amherst Chase. The final men's singles event was held 1896 that was won by Frederick Kemp (Fritz) Ward. In 1915 the venue changed its name to the Tennis Club of Rochester. During World War I the club was host for the Red Cross Tournament that featured Molla" Bjurstedt Mallory

== See also ==
- Rochester Open (an early English tennis tournament from 1881 to 1924).
