= Delaware Field Club Open =

Defunct tennis tournament
- Founded: 1887; 138 years ago
- Abolished: 1889; 136 years ago
- Location: Wilmington, Delaware, United States
- Venue: Delaware Field Club
- Surface: Clay

The Delaware Field Club Open also known as the Delaware Field Club Lawn Tennis Tournament was an American 19th century tennis competition founded in 1887. The tournament was usually held in early Autumn. The event was played at the Delaware Field Club, Wilmington, Delaware, United States and was discontinued in 1889.

== History ==
In 1885 the Delaware Field Club was founded. The club first staged the first Delaware Field Club Open in September 1886 the event was played on clay courts. The tournament was discontinued in 1889.

== Finals ==
=== Men's singles ===
(Incomplete roll)

Year	Champions	Runners-up	Score
1887	(United States) Charles Belmont Davis	(United States) Marmaduke Smith	6–3, 6–4, 6–2.
1888	(United States) Gustavus Remak jr	(United States) Charles T. Lee	2–6, 6–3, 6–3, 9–7.

=== Women's singles ===
(Incomplete roll)

Year	Champions	Runners-up	Score
1887	(United States) Bertha Townsend	(United States) Ellen Hansell	6–4, 6–4
1888	(United States) Florence Bayard	(United States) Katharine Pyle	6–3, 6–0
