= Royal South Yarra Championships =

Defunct tennis tournament
- Tour: ILTF (1913-1947)
- Founded: 1887; 139 years ago
- Abolished: 1968; 58 years ago
- Location: South Yarra, Melbourne, Victoria, Australia
- Venue: Royal South Yarra Lawn Tennis Club
- Surface: Grass

The Royal South Yarra Championships was a men's grass court tennis tournament founded in 1887 as the Royal South Yarra Lawn Tennis Club Tournament. It was first played at Royal South Yarra Lawn Tennis Club, South Yarra, Melbourne, Victoria, Australia. The tournament was staged until 1968 when it was discontinued.

== History ==
In 1884 the Royal South Yarra Lawn Tennis Club was founded. In 1887 the Royal South Yarra Lawn Tennis Club Tournament was established. In 1893 the tournament was rebranded as the Royal South Yarra Championships. In 1901 a women's event was added to the schedule. The championships were held annually through till 1968 when they were discontinued.

The first winners of the men's singles event was James Dickson and the final winner was Peter Keller. The first winner of the ladies singles was a Miss Salter and the final winner was Val Bermingham. Other Australian and international player who have also won the singles championship title included; Léonce Aslangul, Harry Hopman, Pat O'Hara Wood, Harry Hassett, John Bromwich, Tom Okker, Esna Boyd, Margaret Smith, Deidre Catt, Judy Tegart and Madonna Schacht
