= William Thacher =

American tennis player

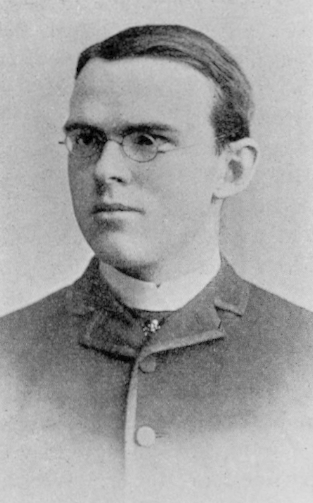
- As a Yale undergraduate
- Full name: William Larned Thacher
- Born: October 9, 1866; New Haven, Connecticut, United States
- Died: November 2, 1953 (aged 87); Sierra Madre, California, United States
- Turned pro: 1885 (amateur tour)
- Retired: 1888

Singles

Grand Slam singles results
- US Open: SF (1887)

Mixed doubles

William Larned Thacher (1866–1953) was an American tennis player.

== Biography ==
William Thacher was born in New Haven, Connecticut on October 9, 1866. Thacher was a champion at Yale and semi finalist in the 1886 National Intercollegiate singles. Thacher was very well travelled and played several sports recreationally. Thacher also took an active part in his local church. While headmaster at the Thacher school (started by his brother) in Ojai, California, William built new tennis courts at the school and helped the game to thrive.

On his sole appearance in the U. S. Championships in 1887, Thacher beat Godfrey Brinley before losing to Howard Taylor in the semifinals.

He died in Sierra Madre, California on November 2, 1953.
