= Philip Sears =

American tennis player and sculptor (1867–1953)

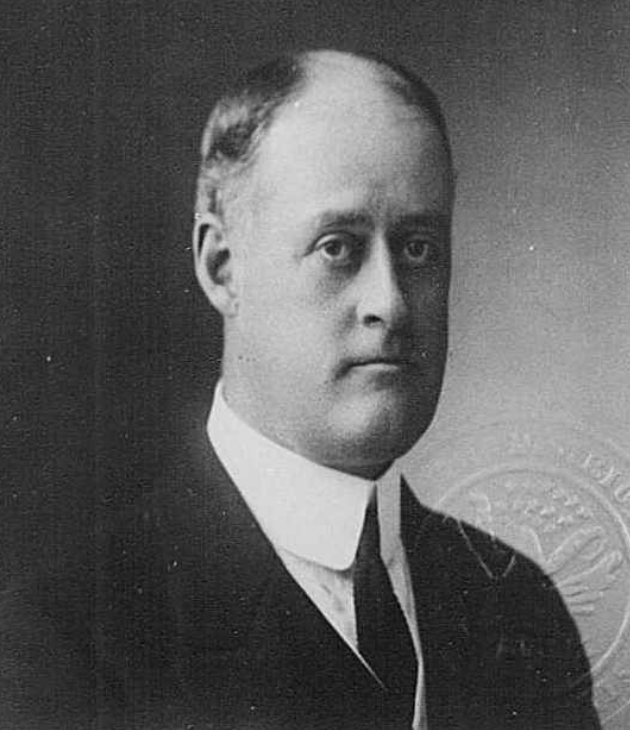
- Full name: Philip Shelton Sears
- Country (sports): United States
- Born: November 12, 1867 Massachusetts, U.S.
- Died: March 10, 1953 (aged 85) Brookline, Massachusetts, U.S.
- Turned pro: 1884 (amateur tour)
- Retired: 1892
- Plays: Right-handed (one-handed backhand)

Singles
- Career titles: 4

Grand Slam singles results
- US Open: SF (1888)

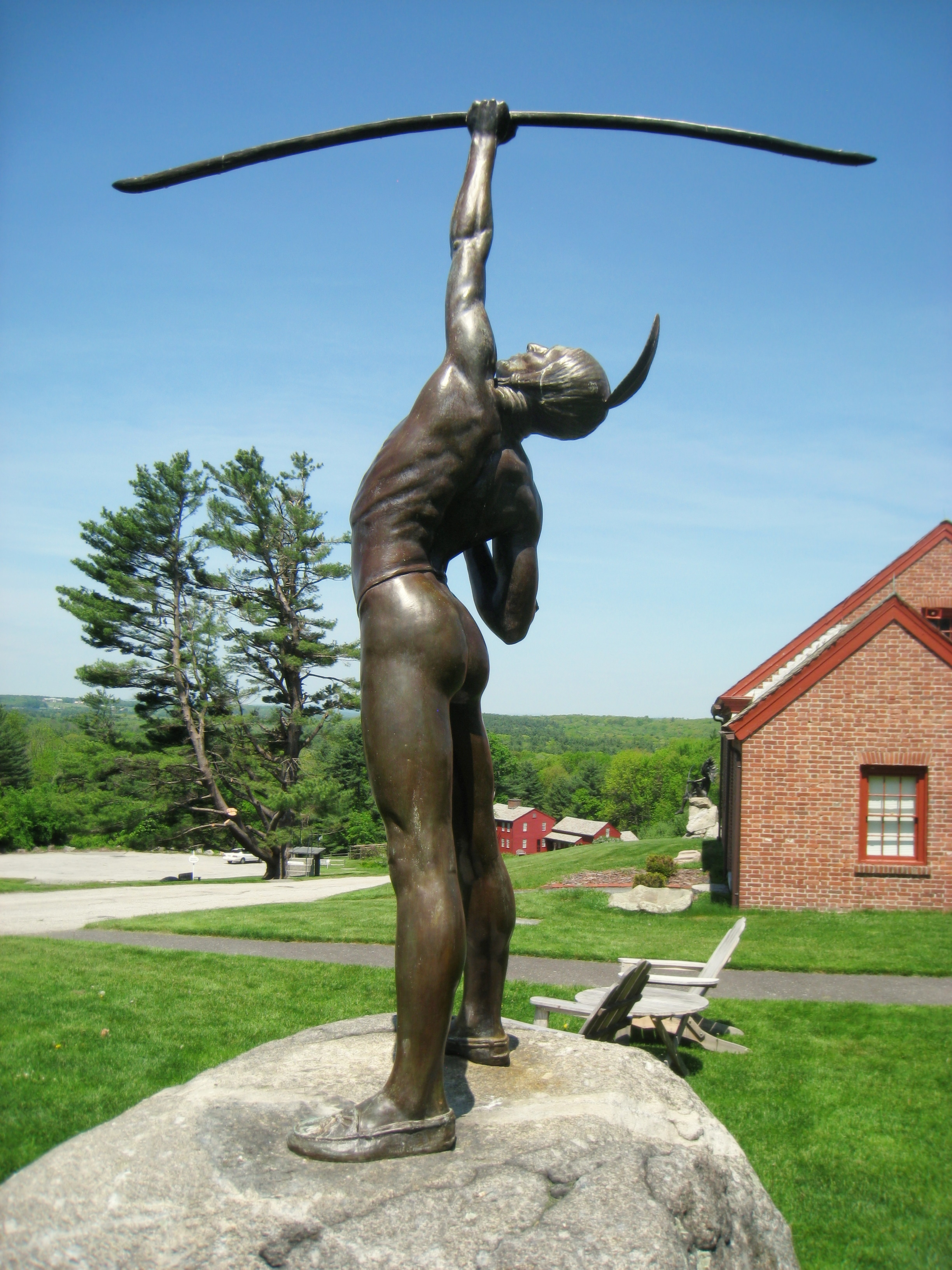
Sculpture by Sears "Pumanangwet" (He Who Shoots the Stars), Fruitlands Museum

Philip Shelton Sears (November 12, 1867 – March 10, 1953) was an American tennis player and sculptor.

== Early life ==
He was the son of Frederic Richard Sears and Albertina Homer Shelton. His twin brother was Herbert M. Sears, and older brother Richard Sears, was also a tennis player, and won the US Open singles in its first seven years, from 1881 to 1887, and the doubles for six years from 1882 to 1887, after which he retired from tennis. He won the NCAA Men's Tennis Championship in 1887 and 1888 while at Harvard University. He would later graduate from Harvard Law School in 1892.

== Tennis career ==
In 1884 he played his first singles event at the Longwood Cricket Club Tournament, the same year he was a losing finalist at the Lenox Invitation to Walter Van Rensselaer Berry.

In 1887 he reached the finals of the Wentworth Open losing to Henry Slocum.

Sears reached the semifinals of the U.S. National Championships in 1888, and the quarterfinals in 1887. He also won the U.S. Intercollegiate Championships two times in 1887 and 1888.

In 1888 he won the Wellesley Open against Arthur Williston

In 1890 he won the Lenox Invitation tournament in New York City against Oliver Samuel Campbell. In 1891 he finished runner-up to Edward L. Hall at the Longwood Bowl tournament.

== Sculptor ==
He was active as a sculptor in Boston. His work was part of the art competitions at the 1928 Summer Olympics and the 1932 Summer Olympics.

In 2007, the original statue of Pumanangwet (He Who Shoots the Stars), sold for $11,250 at Christie's in Beverly Hills; the life-size version, placed in the 1920s and pictured, left, was commissioned by his cousin Clara Endicott Sears and is located at the Fruitlands Museum in Harvard, Massachusetts.

== Personal life ==
His son Mason Sears (1899-1973) was a member of the Massachusetts General Court and the chairman of the Massachusetts Republican Party.
