= 1887 Wimbledon Championships – Men's doubles =

Men's doubles
- 1887 Wimbledon Championships

Final
- Champions: (United Kingdom) Patrick Bowes-Lyon (United Kingdom) Herbert Wilberforce
- Runners-up: (United Kingdom) E. Barratt-Smith (United Kingdom) James Crispe
- Score: 7–5, 6–3, 6–2

Details
- Draw: 7
- Seeds: –

Events
Singles	men	women
Doubles	men	women
- Wimbledon Championships

Patrick Bowes-Lyon and Herbert Wilberforce defeated E. Barratt-Smith and James Crispe 7–5, 6–3, 6–2 in the all comers' final to win the gentlemen's doubles tennis title at the 1887 Wimbledon Championships. The reigning champions Ernest Renshaw and William Renshaw were unable to defend their title due to William suffering from tennis elbow.

== Draw ==
Key

- Q = Qualifier
- WC = Wild card
- LL = Lucky loser
- Alt = Alternate
- ITF = ITF entry
- PR = Protected ranking
- SR = Special ranking
- SE = Special exempt
- JE = Junior exempt
- JR = Junior Accelerator Programme entrant
- CO = College Accelerator Programme entrant
- NG = Next Gen Accelerator Program entrant
- w/o = Walkover
- r = Retired
- d = Defaulted

=== All Comers' ===
First round
(United Kingdom) Harry Barlow (United Kingdom) Penn Gaskell	4	6	6
(United Kingdom) Oswald Milne (United Kingdom) FM Still	6	1	2
(United Kingdom) NM Farrer (United Kingdom) S Winkworth
(United Kingdom) GED Brown (United Kingdom) P Brown	w/o

Quarterfinals
(United Kingdom) E Barratt-Smith (United Kingdom) James Crispe	9	6
(United Kingdom) William Taylor (United Kingdom) AG Ziffo	7	2
(United Kingdom) Wilfred Milne (United Kingdom) EV Thompson	6	3	2
(United Kingdom) Harry Barlow (United Kingdom) Penn Gaskell	4	6	6
(United Kingdom) NM Farrer (United Kingdom) S Winkworth
(United Kingdom) MG MacNamara (United Kingdom) JPF Rawlinson	w/o
(United Kingdom) Claude Farrer (United Kingdom) Arthur Stanley	5	2
(United Kingdom) Patrick Bowes-Lyon (United Kingdom) Herbert Wilberforce	7	6

Semifinals
(United Kingdom) E Barratt-Smith (United Kingdom) James Crispe	6	6
(United Kingdom) Harry Barlow (United Kingdom) Penn Gaskell	1	2
(United Kingdom) NM Farrer (United Kingdom) S Winkworth	4	3
(United Kingdom) Patrick Bowes-Lyon (United Kingdom) Herbert Wilberforce	6	6

Final
(United Kingdom) E Barratt-Smith (United Kingdom) James Crispe	5	3	2
(United Kingdom) Patrick Bowes-Lyon (United Kingdom) Herbert Wilberforce	7	6	6
