= 1887 Wimbledon Championships =

- Date: 2 – 7 July
- Edition: 11th
- Category: Grand Slam
- Surface: Grass
- Location: Worple Road; SW19, Wimbledon, London, United Kingdom
- Venue: All England Lawn Tennis Club

Champions

Men's singles
- (United Kingdom) Herbert Lawford

Women's singles
- (United Kingdom) Lottie Dod

Men's doubles
- (United Kingdom) Patrick Bowes-Lyon / (United Kingdom) Herbert Wilberforce
- Wimbledon Championships

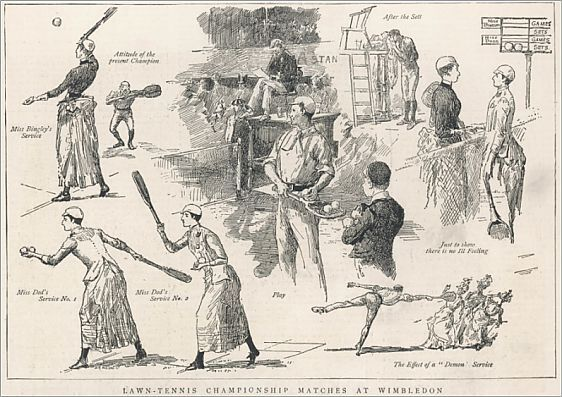
Lawn-Tennis Championship Matches at Wimbledo, 1887

The 1887 Wimbledon Championships took place on the outdoor grass courts at the All England Lawn Tennis Club in Wimbledon, London, United Kingdom. The tournament ran from 2 July until 7 July. It was the 11th staging of the Wimbledon Championships, and the first Grand Slam tennis event of 1887. From 1880 to 1887 the men's singles draw fell from 60 to 16, this was attributed to the superior expertise of the Renshaw brothers and Herbert Lawford. Lawford won the gentleman's singles title after defeating Ernest Renshaw in the All Comers final. Defending champions William Renshaw was unable to play the Challenge Round due to a tennis elbow.

The Ladies singles competition was won by Lottie Dod who won the title at an age of 15 years and 285 days and became the youngest ever Wimbledon singles champion.

== Champions ==
=== Men's singles ===
(United Kingdom) Herbert Lawford defeated (United Kingdom) Ernest Renshaw, 1–6, 6–3, 3–6, 6–4, 6–4

=== Women's singles ===
(United Kingdom) Lottie Dod defeated (United Kingdom) Blanche Bingley, 6–2, 6–0

=== Men's doubles ===
(United Kingdom) Patrick Bowes-Lyon / (United Kingdom) Herbert Wilberforce defeated (United Kingdom) Edward Barratt-Smith / (United Kingdom) James Herbert Crispe, 6–3, 6–3, 6–2

| Preceded by 1886 U.S. National Championships | Grand Slams | Succeeded by 1887 U.S. National Championships |
