= Herbert Wilberforce =

British tennis player

- Full name: Herbert William Wrangham Wilberforce
- Country (sports): (United Kingdom) Great Britain
- Born: 8 February 1864 Munich, Kingdom of Bavaria
- Died: 28 March 1941 (aged 77) Kensington, London, England

Singles
- Career titles: 14

Grand Slam singles results
- Wimbledon: SF (1886)

Grand Slam doubles results
- Wimbledon: W (1887)

Sir Herbert William Wrangham Wilberforce (8 February 1864 – 28 March 1941) was a British male tennis player and later vice-president of the All England Lawn Tennis and Croquet Club from 1911 to 1921, and served as its president from 1921 to 1936.

His biggest singles title success was in 1883, when he won the Northern Championships. In 1887, he and Patrick Bowes-Lyon won the doubles in Wimbledon.

In 1888, they were unable to defend their title when they were beaten in the Challenge Round by Ernest and William Renshaw. His best singles performance at Wimbledon came in 1886, when he reached the semifinal of the All Comers tournament in which he lost in five sets to compatriot Ernest Lewis. He also reached the quarter-finals of the singles in 1882, 1883, and 1888.

Herbert Wilberforce was a brother of physicist Lionel, son of judge Edward, and grandson of archdeacon Robert Wilberforce.

He later served as president and chairman of the All England Lawn Tennis Club. He was made a Knight Bachelor in the 1931 New Year Honours.

== Grand Slam finals ==
=== Doubles (1 title, 1 runner-up) ===
Result	Year	Championship	Surface	Partner	Opponents	Score
Win	1887	Wimbledon	Grass	(United Kingdom) Patrick Bowes-Lyon	(United Kingdom) H.J. Crispe (United Kingdom) E. Barratt-Smith	7–5, 6–3, 6–2
Loss	1888	Wimbledon	Grass	(United Kingdom) Patrick Bowes-Lyon	(United Kingdom) Ernest Renshaw (United Kingdom) William Renshaw	6–2, 6–1, 3–6, 4–6, 3–6

== Barrister and magistrate ==
Having studied law at the University of London, he was called to the bar at the Inner Temple in 1888, and practised on the North Eastern Circuit. He was appointed a stipendiary magistrate in Bradford, Yorkshire. In 1914, he was appointed to the Metropolitan Bench of Magistrates and in 1926 became Deputy Chairman of the County of London Quarter Sessions. He retired in 1938.

== Politics ==
A member of the Liberal Party, Wilberforce unsuccessfully contested Hackney North at the 1900 General Election. In 1901, he was elected to the London County Council as a Progressive Party councillor representing St Pancras North. He served a single three-year term on the county council.
