= Patrick Bowes-Lyon (tennis) =

British tennis player

- Country (sports): (United Kingdom)
- Born: 5 March 1863 Belgravia, Middlesex, England
- Died: 5 October 1946 (aged 83) Westerham, Kent, England

Singles
- Career titles: 11

Grand Slam singles results
- Wimbledon: QF (1885)

Grand Slam doubles results
- Wimbledon: W (1887)

Patrick Bowes-Lyon (5 March 1863 – 5 October 1946) was a British tennis player, barrister and uncle of Elizabeth Bowes-Lyon, mother of Queen Elizabeth II.

== Career ==
He won the Scottish Championships in 1885, 1886 and 1888, he won the doubles at Wimbledon alongside Herbert Wilberforce. As a younger brother of Claude Bowes-Lyon, 14th Earl of Strathmore and Kinghorne, who was Elizabeth Bowes-Lyon's father, he was a great-uncle of Queen Elizabeth II and Herbert Bowes-Lyon who also played tennis.

He stood as the Conservative Party candidate for Barnard Castle.

== Personal life ==
The fifth of seven sons and one of the eleven children of Claude Bowes-Lyon, 13th Earl of Strathmore and Kinghorne and of Frances Dora Smith, he married Alice Wiltshire, daughter of George Wiltshire, on 9 August 1893.

He and his wife Alice had four children:

1. Lt. Gavin Patrick (13 December 1895 – 27 November 1917) – killed in action in World War I; never married, no issue
2. Angus Patrick (22 October 1899 – 10 July 1923) – died by suicide; never married, no issue
3. Jean Barbara (9 October 1904 – 7 January 1963) – never married, no issue
4. Margaret Ann (14 June 1907 – 14 August 1999) – married 2 June 1945 Lt. Col. Francis Arthur Philip D'Abreu (1 October 1904 – 6 November 1995). Had one son and two daughters: Anthony Patrick John D'Abreu (born 17 March 1946), Francesca D'Abreu (born 7 February 1948), and Anne Teresa Alice D'Abreu (16 February 1950 – 17 April 1995).

Besides being a British tennis player, he was also known as Queen Elizabeth The Queen Mother's paternal uncle. He was a guest at her wedding to Prince Albert in 1923.

He died on 5 October 1946, aged 83. His widow died in 1953 at the age of 86.

== Grand Slam finals ==
=== Doubles (1 title, 1 runner-up) ===
| Result | Year | Championship | Surface | Partner | Opponents | Score |
|---|---|---|---|---|---|---|
| Win | 1887 | Wimbledon | Grass | (United Kingdom) Herbert Wilberforce | (United Kingdom) H.J. Crispe (United Kingdom) E. Barratt-Smith | 7–5, 6–3, 6–2 |
| Loss | 1888 | Wimbledon | Grass | (United Kingdom) Herbert Wilberforce | (United Kingdom) Ernest Renshaw (United Kingdom) William Renshaw | 6–2, 6–1, 3–6, 4–6, 3–6 |
