= 1881 men's tennis season =

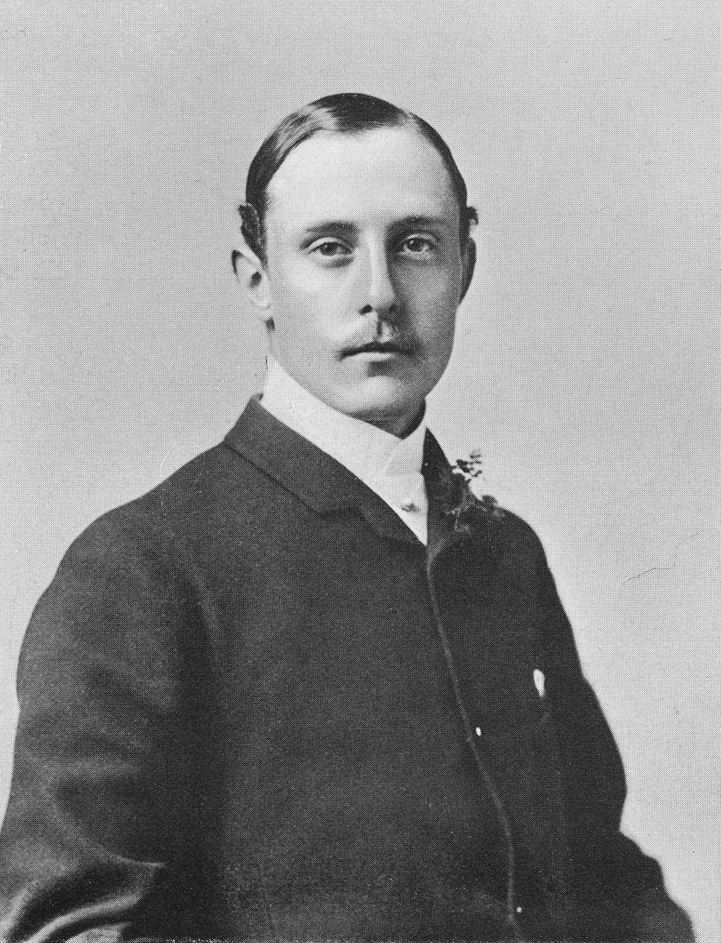
- William Renshaw won most titles this year

Details
- Duration: 19 April – 10 November
- Tournaments: 73 (Amateur)
- Categories: Important (5 ) National (2); Provincial/Regional/State (6); County (6); Local/other (54)

Achievements (singles)
- Most titles: (England) William Renshaw (4)
- Most finals: (United Kingdom) Richard Taswell Richardson (5)

The 1881 men's tennis season incorporates 73 tournaments staged in Australia, Canada, Great Britain and Ireland, and the United States. The 1881 Wimbledon Championships was won by William Renshaw. This year also saw the inaugural and important 1881 U.S. National Championships held at Newport Casino which Richard Sears won. This was also the year that the United States National Lawn Tennis Association, which is the world's first national tennis association, was founded. Renshaw then went on to win two other big tournaments of the year, namely, the Irish Lawn Tennis Championships and Princes Club Championships, whilst Richard Taswell Richardson won the prestigious Northern Championships.

The season began in April in Cheltenham, England, and ended in November in Melbourne, Australia.

== Calendar ==
Notes 1: Challenge round: the final round of a tournament, in which the winner of a single-elimination phase faces the previous year's champion, who plays only that one match. The challenge round was used in the early history of tennis (from 1877 through 1921), in some tournaments, not all.

* Indicates challenger

Notes 2:Tournaments in italics were events that were staged only onetime

Key

Important.
National
Provincial/State/Regional
County
Local

=== January to March ===
No events

=== April ===
Date	Tournament	Winner	Finalist	Semifinalist	Quarterfinalist
4 April.	North Northamptonshire LTC Tournament (First Meeting); Drayton Park; Kettering; Northamptonshire ? Singles; Doubles	(United Kingdom) G.H. Evans ?	(United Kingdom) ?		
19–23 April.	Cheltenham Covered Court Championships; Imperial Winter Gardens; Cheltenham, England; Wood (i); Singles - Doubles	(United Kingdom) Ernest Renshaw; 6-2, 3-6, 6-1, 8-6	(Ireland) Ernest Browne	(United Kingdom) Major Henry Holley Goodeve (United Kingdom) G. Harrison	(England) Ernest Edwin Meek (England) Henry Blane Porter (United Kingdom) S. Davies
19–23 April.	Cheltenham Covered Court Championships; Imperial Winter Gardens; Cheltenham, England; Wood (i); Singles - Doubles	(United Kingdom) Ernest Renshaw (United Kingdom) William Renshaw def	(United Kingdom) George Montague Butterworth (United Kingdom) G. Harrison.	(United Kingdom) Major Henry Holley Goodeve (United Kingdom) G. Harrison	(England) Ernest Edwin Meek (England) Henry Blane Porter (United Kingdom) S. Davies
19–23 April.	Cheltenham Covered Court Championships; Imperial Winter Gardens; Cheltenham, England; Wood (i); Singles - Doubles	(Ireland) Ernest Browne (United Kingdom) Miss Williams def	(United Kingdom) Henry Blane Porter (United Kingdom) Miss. Florence Mardall.	(United Kingdom) Major Henry Holley Goodeve (United Kingdom) G. Harrison	(England) Ernest Edwin Meek (England) Henry Blane Porter (United Kingdom) S. Davies

=== May ===
Date	Tournament	Winner	All Comers' Finalist	Semifinalist	Quarterfinalist
23–29 May	Irish Lawn Tennis Championships; Dublin, Ireland; Outdoor; Grass; Singles - Doubles	(United Kingdom) William Renshaw; 1-6 6-4 6-3 6-1	(United Kingdom) Richard Taswell Richardson	(Ireland) Peter Aungier	(United Kingdom) A J Mullholland (United Kingdom) Ernest Renshaw (United Kingdom) Otway Woodhouse
23–29 May	Irish Lawn Tennis Championships; Dublin, Ireland; Outdoor; Grass; Singles - Doubles	Challenge round (United Kingdom) Herbert Lawford		(Ireland) Peter Aungier	(United Kingdom) A J Mullholland (United Kingdom) Ernest Renshaw (United Kingdom) Otway Woodhouse
23–29 May	Irish Lawn Tennis Championships; Dublin, Ireland; Outdoor; Grass; Singles - Doubles	(Ireland) Spencer Duncan Maul (Ireland) Miss Costello; 6-4, 7-5	(Ireland) Robert Hassard (Ireland) Miss. D. Meldon	(Ireland) Peter Aungier	(United Kingdom) A J Mullholland (United Kingdom) Ernest Renshaw (United Kingdom) Otway Woodhouse
31 May. (Note: The St.George's Hill tournament was staged at Weybridge, Surrey from 1880 to 1966 on grass courts, it was known as the Brooklands Open between 1913-14.)	St.George's Hill Tournament; St. George's Hill LTC; Weybridge, Surrey, England; Outdoor; Grass; Singles	(England) Wilfred Milne; 3 sets to 0	(United Kingdom) B. Hawes	(United Kingdom) F.M. Ashley (England) Oswald Milne	(United Kingdom) F.M. Ashley (United Kingdom) Ferguson G. Davies (United Kingdom) Mr. Maclachlan (United Kingdom) Rev. G.S. Money

=== June ===
Date	Tournament	Winner	Finalist	Semifinalist	Quarter finalist
June.	Oxford University Champion Tournament; Norham Gardens, Oxford, Great Britain; Grass; Singles – Doubles	(United Kingdom of Great Britain and Ireland) Robert Wallace Braddell; 6-4, 8-6, 6-2	(United Kingdom of Great Britain and Ireland) Rev. Thomas Poltimore Dimond		
30 May–4 June. (Note: The Cambridge University tournament ran from 1881 to 1903 and featured winners such as Herbert Wilberforce and Anthony (Tony) Wilding.)	Cambridge University Tournament; Cambridge University LTC; Cambridge, England; Outdoor; Grass; Singles - Doubles	(England) Barclay Fowell Buxton ?	(England) Erskine Gerald Watson	(United Kingdom) E.W. Brooke ? (United Kingdom) R. Hunt ?	(United Kingdom) A.C. Cooper ? (United Kingdom) R. Hunt; Bye (United Kingdom) J.E. McMaster ? (United Kingdom) J.H.M. Whitehead ?
1–5 June	West of England Championships; Bath, Great Britain; Outdoor; Grass; Singles - Doubles	(United Kingdom) Pelham Von Donop; 5-6 6-5 6-3	(United Kingdom) John Charles Kay	(United Kingdom) John Charles Kay; Bye (Ireland) William Norton Barry	(United Kingdom) H. C. Jenkins (United Kingdom) Henry Blane Porter
5-10 June	Worcester Park Challenge Cup. Worcester, Worcestershire, England; Grass	(United Kingdom) F. Durant ?	(United Kingdom) ?		
6–12 June	Waterloo Tournament; Liverpool, Great Britain; Outdoor; Grass; Singles - Doubles	(United Kingdom) Richard Taswell Richardson; 6-0 6-0	(United Kingdom) R W Jones	(United Kingdom) Henry Blane Porter (United Kingdom) R W Jones	(United Kingdom) W. G. Barker (United Kingdom) T. R. Hunt (United Kingdom) C. Phillips
6–12 June	Princes Club Championships; London, Great Britain; Outdoor; Grass; Singles - Doubles	(United Kingdom) William Renshaw; 7-5 4-6 6-0 6-3	(Ireland) Alfred John Mulholland	(Scotland) Herbert Lawford	(United Kingdom) Richard Taswell Richardson (United Kingdom) John Charles Cole (United Kingdom) L. G. Campbell
6–12 June	Essex Championships; Brentwood, Great Britain; Outdoor; Grass; Singles - Doubles	(United Kingdom) Dale Womersley; 6-0 6-4	(United Kingdom) Nalton Womersley	(United Kingdom) Edward North Buxton	(England) Charles Walder Grinstead; 6-3 6-1 (England) Albert Womersley (United Kingdom) W.C. Wells (United Kingdom) A. Fowler was absent.
16–18 June.	Liverpool Cricket Club Lawn Tennis Tournament; Liverpool Cricket Club; Aigburth, Liverpool, England; Grass; Singles	(United Kingdom) Richard Taswell Richardsons; 6-0, 6-0	(United Kingdom of Great Britain and Ireland) Reginald Herbert Jones		
20–26 June	Northern Championships (United Kingdom) Manchester, Great Britain; Outdoor; Grass; Singles - Doubles	(United Kingdom) Richard Taswell Richardson; 6-1 6-1 6-0	(United Kingdom) Walter Edwin Fairlie	(United Kingdom) Minden Fenwick	(United Kingdom) A. L. Payne (United Kingdom) Percival C. Fenwick (United Kingdom) J. J. Yates
20–26 June	Northern Championships (United Kingdom) Manchester, Great Britain; Outdoor; Grass; Singles - Doubles	Challenge round (United Kingdom) John Comber		(United Kingdom) Minden Fenwick	(United Kingdom) A. L. Payne (United Kingdom) Percival C. Fenwick (United Kingdom) J. J. Yates

=== July ===
Date	Tournament	Winner	All comers' finalist	Semifinalist	Quarterfinalist
26 June–1 July.	Rochester Open; The Paddock; King's School, Rochester, Kent, England; Grass; Singles	(United Kingdom) H. Blatherwick; 6-3,6-3,6-4	(United Kingdom) A. Buchanan		
2–13 July	Wimbledon Championship; London, Great Britain; Outdoor; Grass; Singles	(United Kingdom) William Renshaw; 6–0, 6–1, 6–1	(United Kingdom) Richard Taswell Richardson	(United Kingdom) Herbert Lawford	(United Kingdom) George S. Murray Hill (United Kingdom) Otway Woodhouse (United Kingdom) William Henry Darby
2–13 July	Wimbledon Championship; London, Great Britain; Outdoor; Grass; Singles	Challenge round (United Kingdom) John Hartley		(United Kingdom) Herbert Lawford	(United Kingdom) George S. Murray Hill (United Kingdom) Otway Woodhouse (United Kingdom) William Henry Darby
11–17 July	Scottish Championships; Edinburgh, Great Britain; Outdoor; Grass; Singles	(Scotland) John Galbraith Horn; 6-1 6-5	(United Kingdom) A L Davidson	(United Kingdom) T A Bell	(United Kingdom) B S Cunliffe (United Kingdom) Captain Gosling (United Kingdom) Charles C Maconochie (United Kingdom) Captain Sterling
12 July.	Championship of the Esher LTC. Esher Lawn Tennis Club; Esher, Surrey, England; Grass	(United Kingdom) Clement Edward Cottrell; 6-5, 6-5, 6-1	(United Kingdom) Charles Martineau		
12 July.	Bedfordshire LTC Tournament; North Beds Lawn Tennis Club; Blunhem House, Fairfield, Bedfordshire, England; Grass	(United Kingdom) Cecil Henry Polhill-Turner ?	(United Kingdom) R. Hughes	(United Kingdom) C. Mellor	(United Kingdom) A.K. Lindsell (United Kingdom) F.H. Smith (United Kingdom) Captain Leigh Warner
16 July.	Woodford Parish Championship; County Cricket Ground; Woodford Parish, England; Grass; Singles	(United Kingdom) Edward North Buxton; 2 sets to 0	(United Kingdom); R.C. Ball		?
15-16 July.	Staffordshire County Cricket Club Lawn Tennis Tournament. Lichfield, Great Britain; Grass; Singles	(United Kingdom) Henry W. J. Gardner; 6-4, 2-6, 6-5	(United Kingdom) E.W. Burnett	(United Kingdom) A.W. Hart (United Kingdom) E.K. Wade	(United Kingdom) John George Chamberlain (United Kingdom) C.E. Green (United Kingdom) L.G. Knight
17–20 July	Alliance LTC Championship; Crouch End Hill, Crouch End, London, England; Outdoor; Grass; Singles	(United Kingdom) F.A. Clark ?	?		
20-23 July.	North Northamptonshire LTC Tournament (Second Meeting); Grafton Underwood; North Northamptonshire ? Singles; Doubles	(United Kingdom) Edward North Buxton ?	(United Kingdom) H.E. Kaye	(United Kingdom) N.F. Roberts (United Kingdom) Daniel Wiltringham Stable	(United Kingdom) A. Fowler (United Kingdom) S.E. Palmer (United Kingdom) Ernest Robert Stable (United Kingdom) E. Wheeler
20-23 July.	North Northamptonshire LTC Tournament (Second Meeting); Grafton Underwood; North Northamptonshire ? Singles; Doubles	Challenge round (United Kingdom) F.E. Deck		(United Kingdom) N.F. Roberts (United Kingdom) Daniel Wiltringham Stable	(United Kingdom) A. Fowler (United Kingdom) S.E. Palmer (United Kingdom) Ernest Robert Stable (United Kingdom) E. Wheeler
18–24 July	Canadian Championships; Toronto, Canada; Outdoor; Grass; Singles	(Canada) Isidore F. Hellmuth; 6–2, 6–2	(Canada) W.H. Young		?
18–24 July	Edgbaston Open Tournament; Edgbaston, Great Britain; Outdoor; Grass; Singles	(United Kingdom) Dr. Walter W. Chamberlain; 6-3 6-1 6-4	(United Kingdom) F.S. Goodwin	(United Kingdom) G.R. Brewerton (United Kingdom) R.W. Miller	(United Kingdom) G.H. Cartland (United Kingdom) G.J. Chamerlain (United Kingdom) H. Simonds (United Kingdom) J. Lambert
25–30 July	London Athletic Club Tournament; Fulham, London, Great Britain; Outdoor; Grass; Singles	(United Kingdom) Frederick Lawrence Rawson; 6-1 4-6 6-2 6-3	(United Kingdom) Otway Woodhouse	(United Kingdom) Edgar Lubbock (United Kingdom) G. H. Taylor	(United Kingdom) B. James (United Kingdom) Ernest Wool Lewis (England) Augustus Adolphus Nepean
30 July.	Harrow Lawn Tennis Club Tournament. Harrow Lawn Tennis Club; Harrow, Middlesex, England; Grass	(United Kingdom) Frederick Gordon Templer; 2 sets to 1	(United Kingdom) J. Ruault	(United Kingdom) J.P. Charles (United Kingdom) G. Holmes	(United Kingdom) C. Edwards (France) W. Guillemard (United Kingdom) E.S. Prior (United Kingdom) W. Wilkinson
25–30 July	Norwich Open Tournament. Chapelfield Gardens; Norwich, Norfolk England ?	(United Kingdom) Francis William Monement; 6-2 6-4	(United Kingdom) Edward Morgan Hansell	(United Kingdom) William Bolding Monement	(United Kingdom) Henry Edward John Browne (United Kingdom) Walter Edward Hansell (United Kingdom) R.H. Perkin
25–31 July	Dundalk Tournament; Dundalk, Ireland; Outdoor; Grass; Singles	(Ireland) Robert Shaw Templer def.	(Ireland) Kerry Leyne Supple	(Ireland) H Graves	(Ireland) A. Edes (Ireland) Frederick Gordon Templer

=== August ===
Date	Tournament	Winner	Finalist	Semifinalist	Quarter finalist
August.	Tivyside LTC Tournament; Tivyside Lawn Tennis Club; Newcastle Emlyn, Carmarthenshire, Wales; Outdoor; Grass; Singles	(Wales) George Bevan Bowen ?			
August	Hexham Tournament; Hexham, Northumberland, England; Outdoor; Grass; Singles	(England) Jasper Gibson; 6-0, 6-0, 6-2	(United Kingdom) M. Liddell	(United Kingdom) J.W. Fowler (United Kingdom) W. Gibson	(United Kingdom) J.O. Head (United Kingdom) Henry Kirsopp (United Kingdom) J.H. Nicholson
August	Hampstead Cricket Club Tennis Tournament; Hampstead, Middlesex, England; Outdoor; Hard; Singles	(United Kingdom) Harry Sibthorpe Barlow; 3 sets to 1	(United Kingdom) Herbert Chipp	(United Kingdom) Robert Samuel Creaton	(United Kingdom) E.F. Carey (United Kingdom) R.A. Walker
2–4 August.	Cirencester Park Lawn Tennis Tournament; Earl Bathurst Estate; Cirencester Park; Cirencester, Gloucestershire, England; Outdoor; Grass; Singles - Doubles	(United Kingdom) F.E. Rooke ?	(Ireland) Julian Marshall		
4 August.	North Northamptonshire LTC Tournament; Drayton Park; Lowick, Northamptonshire; Grass; Singles; Doubles	(United Kingdom of Great Britain and Ireland) G.H. Evans ?	(United Kingdom) Henry Minshull Stockdale	(United Kingdom of Great Britain and Ireland) R.H. Lindsay (United Kingdom of Great Britain and Ireland) F.G. Hodgson	{
1–6 August	Darlington Open Tournament; Darlington, Great Britain; Outdoor; Grass; Singles	(United Kingdom) A. Springett; 6-0 4-6 6-2	(United Kingdom) Mark Fenwick	(United Kingdom) J.W. Fowler	(United Kingdom) Cecil Fullerton (United Kingdom) Minden Fenwick (United Kingdom) R. De Clare Yeld
1–6 August	Darlington Open Tournament; Darlington, Great Britain; Outdoor; Grass; Singles	(United Kingdom) J.B. Dale (United Kingdom) Miss Alice Cheese; 9-7, 6-3	(United Kingdom) Percival C. Fenwick (United Kingdom) Miss. Winifred Fenwick.	(United Kingdom) J.W. Fowler	(United Kingdom) Cecil Fullerton (United Kingdom) Minden Fenwick (United Kingdom) R. De Clare Yeld
1–7 August	South of Ireland Championships; Limerick, Ireland; Outdoor; Grass; Singles	(Ireland) Edmond Bennett Brackenbury; 0-6 6-3 7-5 8-6	(Ireland) Edward Montiford Longfield	(Ireland) Samuel Martin Gully	(Ireland) G Burton (Ireland) James F J Heffernan Considine (Ireland) Major Henry H Goodeve (Ireland) William Dawson
2-6 August.	County Kildare Closed Tournament; Naas Military Barracks; Naas, County Kildare, Ireland; Grass -	(Ireland) Peter Aungier ?	(Ireland) E.H. Bennett	(United Kingdom) Spencer Duncan Maul (Ireland) W.A. Cairnes	(Ireland) Paul Brown (Ireland) Arthur Owen (Ireland) Major Erasmus D. Borrowes (Ireland) Gilbert de Laval Willis
2-6 August	County Kildare Championship; Naas, Ireland; Outdoor; Grass; Grass; Singles - Doubles	(Ireland) Algernon Ambrose Michael Aylmer; 6-1 6-1 6-5	(Ireland) Francis Metcalfe	(Ireland) Jacob R. Sherrard	(Ireland) James G. Kennedy (Ireland) Thomas C. Owen
2–7 August	Waterford Tournament; Waterford, Ireland; Outdoor; Grass; Singles	(Ireland) Michael G. McNamara; 6-2 6-3	(Ireland) James Joycelyn Glascott	(Ireland) Hercules R Langrishe	(Ireland) Chaloner Knox (Ireland) John H Browne (Ireland) Henry Hills Goodeve
2–8 August.	Orange Invitation; Mountain Station, Montrose; South Orange, New Jersey, US; Outdoor; Grass; Singles - Doubles	(United States) Richard Field Conover; 7-5 6-2 6-3	(United States) A.M. Wood	(United States) Samuel A. Campbell Jr.	(United States) Richard Morse Colgate (United States) S.E. Hall (United States) E. Winslow
8–10 August	Downshire Lawn Tennis Tournament; Downshire Archery and Lawn Tennis Club; Cliftonville Cricket Club Ground, Belfast, Great Britain; Outdoor; Grass	(United Kingdom) F.L. Rawson; 5-2,5-1	(Ireland) F.G.Gordon	(Ireland) J. McNeile (Ireland) W. R. Young	(Ireland) C. L. Graham; 5-1 5-0 (Ireland) F. St John Gordon (Ireland) John H. Browne (Ireland) O. B. Graham
9–12 August	Exmouth Open; Exmouth, Great Britain; Outdoor; Grass; Singles	(United Kingdom) E. W. Mancounchy; 6-3 1-6 6-4	(United Kingdom) Thomas Hoare	(United Kingdom) T.P. Hogg	(United Kingdom) E.G. Farquharson (United Kingdom) G. F. Hampson (United Kingdom) Champion Russell
9–12 August	Exmouth Open; Exmouth, Great Britain; Outdoor; Grass; Singles	(United Kingdom) Henry Kindersley ** (United Kingdom) Miss. Georgiana Kindersley; 2-6, 7-5, 7-5	(Ireland) Thomas Arembery Tombe (United Kingdom) Miss. Lilian Cole.	(United Kingdom) T.P. Hogg	(United Kingdom) E.G. Farquharson (United Kingdom) G. F. Hampson (United Kingdom) Champion Russell
9–12 August	Teignmouth and Shaldon Tournament; Teignmouth, Great Britain; Outdoor; Grass; Singles	(United Kingdom) Champion Branfill Russell; 5-6 6-1 6-0	(United Kingdom) Charles John Cole	(United Kingdom) Charles John Cole (United Kingdom) Spencer Cox	(United Kingdom) Arthur Bellfield (United Kingdom) C. Haynes (Ireland) Thomas Arembery Tombe
8–13 August	North of Ireland Championships; Belfast, Great Britain; Outdoor; Grass; Singles	(Ireland) E. J. Charley; 2-1 (sets)	(United Kingdom) J.R. Bristow	(Ireland) A.H. Callwell (Ireland) A. Eager	(Ireland) E.M. Charley (Ireland) H.O. Lanyon (Ireland) H.W. Boyce (United Kingdom) John Taswell Richardson
13 August.	Langley Marish Tournament; Langley Marish LTC; Langley Marish, Berkshire, England; Grass	(England) Thomas Arthur Nash; 6-5, 3-6, 6-3	(England) Wiliam Harry Nash	(United Kingdom) Maurice John Swabey	(United Kingdom) G.E. Hale | (United Kingdom) Richard Helder
13 Aug.	Gloucestershire Lawn Tennis Tournament; Montpellier Gardens; Cheltenham, Great Britain; Outdoor; Grass/Asphalt; Singles - Doubles	(United Kingdom) George Montague Butterworth; 6-1 6-1	(United Kingdom) Alexander Kaye Butterworth w.o.	(United Kingdom) Walter William Chamberlain	(United Kingdom) H. Hardwick (United Kingdom) Percy Hattersley Smith (United Kingdom) C. Tillard
14–15 August. (Note: The Maidstone tournament was staged from 1881 to 1927.)	Maidstone Lawn Tennis Tournament; Maidstone Athletic Ground; Maidstone, England; Outdoor; Grass; Singles	(United Kingdom) Richard Mercer w.o.	(United Kingdom) Mr. Stited	(United Kingdom) Randall Mercer (United Kingdom) Mr. Scudamore	(United Kingdom) Mr. Ground (United Kingdom) A. Mercer (United Kingdom) Mr. Tasker (United Kingdom) C.G. Traill
15-16 August.	Penzance LTC Tournament; Penzance LTC; Penzance, Cornwall, England; Outdoor; Grass; Singles - Doubles	(United Kingdom) P.H. Fernandez; 6-5 6-5	(United Kingdom) Rev. William Ewart Beamish Barter	(United Kingdom) C.G. Fagan	(United Kingdom) W.E.T. Bolitho (United Kingdom) R.J. McNeill (United Kingdom) H.W. Simons
18-19 August.	Rochford Hundred Club Lawn Tennis Tournament; Rochford Hundred Club; Southend-on-Sea, Essex, England. Outdoor; Grass; Singles - Doubles	(United Kingdom) M. Thackeray; 6-3, 4-6, 6-5	(United Kingdom) W. Wood	(United Kingdom) J.C. Page (United Kingdom) A. Stallibrass	(United Kingdom) E. Benton (United Kingdom) R.C. Browne (United Kingdom) A. Lancaster (United Kingdom) E. Meeson
15–20 August	Devonshire Park Championships; Eastbourne, Great Britain; Grass	(United Kingdom) George S. Murray Hill; 2 sets to 0	(United Kingdom of Great Britain and Ireland) Sidney Alfred Noon	(United Kingdom) Joseph Butler Chamberlain; William C. Taylor	(United Kingdom) Alexander Raymond Aspinall (United Kingdom) F. Link (United Kingdom) Leo Maxse (United Kingdom) E.P. Nicholls
22-26 August	Westgate-on-Sea Tournament; Westgate-on-Sea, Kent, England; Outdoor; Asphalt; Singles	(United Kingdom) G.G. Dineley ?	(United Kingdom) T. Sopwith	(United Kingdom) R. Whyte	(United Kingdom) C. Leigh Clare (United Kingdom) W. Price (United Kingdom) H. Steward
26–30 August.	South Wales Championships; Tenby LTC; Tenby, Carmarthenshire, Wales; Outdoor; Grass; Singles	(United Kingdom) L.G. Campbell; 6-2, 6-5, 9-7	(Wales) Grismond Saunders Davies	(United Kingdom) P.T. Ashe (United Kingdom) Mr. Voyle	(Wales) Mr. Morris (United Kingdom) F. Lort Phillips (United Kingdom) E. Smith (United Kingdom) G. Synge
29 August-4 September	Victoria Park Lawn Tennis Tournament; Exeter, Great Britain; Outdoor; Grass; Singles	(United Kingdom) Champion Branfill Russell; 6-3 7-5	(United Kingdom) Spencer Cox	(United Kingdom) G. Batten ? (United Kingdom) Pelham Von Donop	(United Kingdom) A.Belfield (United Kingdom) A.W. Buckingham (United Kingdom) H. B. Kindersley
29-30 August	Abbot's Court Hoo Tournament; Hoo St Werburgh, Rochester, Kent, England; Outdoor; Grass; Singles	(United Kingdom) E. Mansel; 6-3	(England) Warwick Stunt	(United Kingdom) H. Cobb (United Kingdom) Capt. Johnson	(United Kingdom) Major Blackwood (United Kingdom) F. Day (United Kingdom) Mr. Johnson (United Kingdom) O.H. Pedley
30-31 August.	Holt Lawn Tennis Club Tournament; Holt LTC; Holt, Norfolk, England; Outdoor; Grass; Singles - Doubles	(England) William Meaburn Tatham; 2 sets to 1	(United Kingdom) William Bolding Monement	(United Kingdom) Francis William Monement (England) Charles Edmund Tatham	(England) Henry William Pelham-Clinton (United Kingdom) S. Hart-Davies (England) Edward Morgan Hansell
31 August.	Gore Court Championships; Sittingbourne, Gore Court Archery and LTC; Gore Court, Sittingbourne, Great Britain; Outdoor; Grass; Singles	(United Kingdom) W.H. Patterson; 5-4 6-1	(United Kingdom) J. Patterson	(United Kingdom) John Walter Langlois (United Kingdom) E. Marmion	(United Kingdom) A. Chittenden (United Kingdom) W. Plumb (United Kingdom) E.K. Skinner (United Kingdom) J.A. Tuke
31 July–1 August.	Rochester Open; Paddock Lawn Tennis Club; Rochester, Kent, England; Grass; Singles	(United Kingdom of Great Britain and Ireland) H. Blatherwick; 6-1 6-2	(United Kingdom of Great Britain and Ireland) A. Buchanan	(United Kingdom of Great Britain and Ireland) W.A. Dartnall (United Kingdom of Great Britain and Ireland) W.H. St. John Hope	
31 August - 3 September	U.S. National Championships Newport Casino, Newport, Rhode Island, United States; Outdoor; Grass; Singles; Doubles	(United States) Richard Sears; 6-0 6-3 6-2	(United States) William Glyn	(United States) Edward H. Gray (United States) Samuel Shaw	(United States) Crawford Nightingale (United States) Edward Gray (United States) William Gammell (United States) Mr. Kessler
31 August - 3 September	U.S. National Championships Newport Casino, Newport, Rhode Island, United States; Outdoor; Grass; Singles; Doubles	(United States) Clarence Clark (United States) Frederick Winslow Taylor; 6-5 6-4 6-5	(United States) Alexander Van Rensselaer (United States) Arthur Newbold	(United States) Edward H. Gray (United States) Samuel Shaw	(United States) Crawford Nightingale (United States) Edward Gray (United States) William Gammell (United States) Mr. Kessler

=== September ===
Date	Tournament	Winner	Finalist	Semifinalist	Quarterfinalist
September.	Skipton Tournament; Craven Lawn Tennis Club (f.1879)? Gargrave, Skipton, North Yorkshire, England; Outdoor; Grass	(United Kingdom) T.R. Atkinson ?	(United Kingdom) J.B. Dury	(United Kingdom) R.J. Jefferson	(United Kingdom) J. St. John (England) W. Bairstow (United Kingdom) L. Dewhurst
September.	West Somerset Archery and Lawn Tennis Tournament; West Somerset Lawn Tennis Club; Taunton, Somerset, England; Outdoor; Grass	(United Kingdom) Francis Escott Hancock; 2 sets to 0	(United Kingdom) R.P. Spurway	(United Kingdom) G.F. Hampson (United Kingdom) C.R. Rodwell	(United Kingdom) J. St. John (United Kingdom) A. Newton (United Kingdom) G. Peard (United Kingdom) F. Scott
30 Aug–3 Sept.	Aldershot Division Open Lawn Tennis Tournament; Aldershot Divisional LTC; Aldershot Garrison, Hampshire, England; Outdoor; Grass; Singles	(United Kingdom) Lt-Col Robert H. Stuart Truell; 6–4, 1–6, 6–5	(United Kingdom) Lieut. Robert Howden Kellie	(United Kingdom) Percy Wildman Lushington	(United Kingdom) Lieut. King (United Kingdom) William Robert Boileau Peyton
29 August-4 Sept	Victoria Park Lawn Tennis Tournament; Victoria Park; Exeter, Devon, England; Outdoor; Grass; Singles	(United Kingdom) Spencer Cox; 6-3 7-5	(United Kingdom) Champion Russell	(United Kingdom) G. Batten (United Kingdom) Pelham Von Donop	(United Kingdom) A.Belfield (United Kingdom) A.W. Buckingham (United Kingdom) H. B. Kindersley
5–6 September.	Vale of Clwyd CLTC Open Tournament; Vale of Clwyd LTC; Ruthin, Vale of Clwyd, Wales; Outdoor; Grass; Singles	(England) Percy John Frederick Lush; 5-2 5-4	(United Kingdom) M. Lush	(United Kingdom) R.L. Williams	(United Kingdom) P.J.T. Henery (United Kingdom) A.B. Mesham (United Kingdom) Major. Mesham
5–9 September.	South of England Championships; Devonshire Park Lawn Tennis Club, Eastbourne, Great Britain; Outdoor; Grass; Singles - Doubles	(United Kingdom) Edgar Lubbock; 6-4 6-2 6-0	(United Kingdom) Robert W. Braddell	(United Kingdom) R.N. Cooper-Coles (United Kingdom) Frederick Brunning Maddison	(United Kingdom) Charles John Cole (United Kingdom) C. Fairfax (United Kingdom) Leopold Maxse (United Kingdom) William C. Taylor
13–17 September. (Note: The Torquay Tennis Tournament was staged from 1880 to 1974 on grass courts.)	Torquay Lawn Tennis Tournament; Winter Gardens; Torquay, Great Britain; Outdoor; Grass; Singles	(England) Ernest Maconchy ?	(Ireland) Thomas Arembery Tombe	(United Kingdom) C. Haynes	(England) B.C. Skottowe (United Kingdom) G. Egerton (England) W. Ware
13–17 September.	Torquay Lawn Tennis Tournament; Winter Gardens; Torquay, Great Britain; Outdoor; Grass; Singles	(England) J. Bayly (Ireland) Thomas Arembery Tombe; 6-2 6-4	(United Kingdom) F. Crowdy (United Kingdom) G. Egerton	(United Kingdom) C. Haynes	(England) B.C. Skottowe (United Kingdom) G. Egerton (England) W. Ware
13–17 September.	Torquay Lawn Tennis Tournament; Winter Gardens; Torquay, Great Britain; Outdoor; Grass; Singles	(United Kingdom) W. Ware (United Kingdom) Miss. Coulthard; 6-2 6-4	(Ireland) Thomas Arembery Tombe (United Kingdom) Miss. Cole	(United Kingdom) C. Haynes	(England) B.C. Skottowe (United Kingdom) G. Egerton (England) W. Ware
15–17 September. (Note: The St Leonards-on-Sea Tournament ran from 1880 to 1891.)	Saint Leonards-on-Sea Lawn Tennis Tournament; St Leonards-on-Sea, Great Britain; Outdoor; Grass; Singles	(United Kingdom) Arthur Wellesley Soames; 6-3 6-5 6-5	(United Kingdom) A.H. Trevor	(United Kingdom) S. Twining	(United Kingdom) A.R.N. Coles (United Kingdom) Charles John Chichester Smith
19 September.	White Rose Lawn Tennis Tournament; Gentleman's Cricket Ground; York, Yorkshire, England; Outdoor; Grass; Singles	(United Kingdom) F. Durant; 6-4 6-5	(United Kingdom) E.M. Turner	(United Kingdom) A. Hotham (United Kingdom) Granville Croft	(United Kingdom) Mr. Baines (United Kingdom) Major Lee's
19–24 September. (Note: The East Gloucestershire Championships ran from 1879 to 1969.)	East Gloucestershire Championships; Cheltenham, Great Britain; Outdoor; Grass; Singles	(United Kingdom) William Renshaw; 6–0, 6–1, 6–1	(United Kingdom) Robert Wallace Braddell	(Ireland) Ernest Browne (Ireland) Michael Gallwey McNamara	(United Kingdom) Henry Blane Porter
19–24 September.	East Gloucestershire Championships; Cheltenham, Great Britain; Outdoor; Grass; Singles	Challenge round (Ireland) Ernest Browne		(Ireland) Ernest Browne (Ireland) Michael Gallwey McNamara	(United Kingdom) Henry Blane Porter
24-25 September.	Truro LTC Open Tournament; Truro, Cricket Club; Truro, Cornwall, England; Grass	(United Kingdom) H. Mann ?	(United Kingdom) Francis Joseph Ridgway	(United Kingdom) Lancelot Melvill Haslope (United Kingdom) Robert Fox	(United Kingdom) Charles Reginald Gerveys Grylls (United Kingdom) H.E. Lambe (United Kingdom) T.W. Wilson
26 September-2 October.	Bournemouth Lawn Tennis Club Tournament (later Hampshire Championships); Bournemouth, Great Britain; Outdoor; Grass; Singles - Doubles	(United Kingdom) Montague Hankey; 6-2 6-3 6-0	(United Kingdom) J. G. Johnson	(United Kingdom) Rev. Edmond Bennet Brackenbury (United Kingdom) E.W. Brooke	(United Kingdom) John Dalby Dewhurst (United Kingdom) Edward George Farquharson (United Kingdom) H. Fort (United Kingdom) F.E. Rooke

=== October ===
Date	Tournament	Winner	Finalist	Semifinalist	Quarterfinalist
3–10 October	Armagh ALTC Tournament; Armagh, Northern Ireland; Outdoor; Hard; Singles	(Ireland) Robert Barron Templer; 2-0 (sets)	(United Kingdom) H. Irwin	(United Kingdom) M. Blacker (Ireland) E. J. Wolfe	(United Kingdom) M. Blacker (United Kingdom) A. Burke (United Kingdom) C. S. Poole (Ireland) V. De. Tattersall
3–10 October	Armagh ALTC Tournament; Armagh, Northern Ireland; Outdoor; Hard; Singles	Challenge round (Ireland) Robert Shaw Templer		(United Kingdom) M. Blacker (Ireland) E. J. Wolfe	(United Kingdom) M. Blacker (United Kingdom) A. Burke (United Kingdom) C. S. Poole (Ireland) V. De. Tattersall
3–10 October.	Brighton Lawn Tennis Club Tournament; Brighton Lawn Tennis Club; Queen's Park, Brighton, East Sussex, England; Grass	(United Kingdom) C. Fairfax; 6-1, 6-4, 7-5	(United Kingdom) A.O. Jennings	(United Kingdom) W.P. Bowyer (England) Leonard Dampier	(United Kingdom) A. Evelegh (England) Robert Howden Kellie (United Kingdom) H. Langton (United Kingdom) W. Stuckey
4–10 October	Sussex County Lawn Tennis Tournament; Brighton, Great Britain; Outdoor; Grass; Singles - Doubles	(Ireland) Michael Gallwey McNamara; 2-6 6-2 6-0 6-1	(United Kingdom) Champion Russell	(United Kingdom) Charles John Cole (United Kingdom) Charles Walder Grinstead	(United Kingdom) Humphery H. Berkley (United Kingdom) H. Brooker (United Kingdom) George S. Murray Hill (United Kingdom) H. M. Nichol
4–10 October	Sussex County Lawn Tennis Tournament; Brighton, Great Britain; Outdoor; Grass; Singles - Doubles	(United Kingdom) Henry B. Thornhill (United Kingdom) Miss. E. Munt; 6-3, 6-1	(United Kingdom) Orlando R. Coote (United Kingdom) Miss. Leila Lodwick	(United Kingdom) Charles John Cole (United Kingdom) Charles Walder Grinstead	(United Kingdom) Humphery H. Berkley (United Kingdom) H. Brooker (United Kingdom) George S. Murray Hill (United Kingdom) H. M. Nichol
26–28 October.	St. George's Cricket Club Tournament; St. George's Cricket Club; New York, United States; Outdoor; Grass; Singles - Doubles	(Ireland) John Jameson Cairnes; 7-5 6-2 6-3	(United States) James Rankine	(United States) Charles F. Watson Sr. (United States) F. Ennis	(United States) W. P. Anderson (United States) R. J. Cross (United States) H. Henry (United States) James Rankine

=== November ===
Date	Tournament	Winner	Finalist	Semifinalist	Quarterfinalist
4–10 November	Victorian Championships; Melbourne Cricket Ground; Melbourne, Australia; Outdoor; Hard; Singles - Doubles	(Australia) Louis Whyte; 6-4 4-6 6-1 6-1	(Australia) Francis James Highett	(Australia) J. S. Conran (Australia) Francis James Highett	(Australia) R. H. James (Australia) W. M. Mitchell (Australia) Francis James Highett

=== December ===
No events

== Tournament winners ==
Note: major tournaments are in bold

- (England) William Renshaw—Cheltenham, **Irish Championships**, **Princes Club**, **Wimbledon**—(4)
- (United Kingdom) Richard Taswell Richardson—Aigburth, Waterloo, **Northern Championships**—(2)
- (Ireland) Michael G. McNamara—Brighton-Waterford—(2)
- (United Kingdom) Edward North Buxton—Lowick, Woodford Parish—(1)
- (United States) Richard Sears—**U.S. National Championships**—(1)
- (Ireland) Richard Barron Templer—Armagh—(1)
- (United Kingdom) Pelham Von Donop—Bath—(1)
- (Ireland) E. J. Charley—Belfast—(1)
- (United Kingdom) F. L. Rawson—Belfast—(1)
- (United Kingdom) Montague Hankey—Bournemouth—(1)
- (United Kingdom) C. Fairfax —Brighton—(1)
- (United Kingdom) Barcley Fowell Buxton—Cambridge—(1)
- (England) Ernest Renshaw -Cheltenham (indoor)—(1)
- (United Kingdom) Dale Womersley—Colchester—(1)
- (United Kingdom) F. E. Rook—Cirencester—(1)
- (United Kingdom) A. Springett—Darlington—(1)
- (Ireland) Robert Shaw Templer—Dundalk—(1)
- (United Kingdom) Edgar Lubbock—Eastbourne—(1)
- (United Kingdom) Walter William Chamberlain—Edgbaston—(1)
- (United Kingdom) John Galbraith Horn—Edinburgh—(1)
- (Scotland) Leslie Balfour-Melville—Edinburgh—(1)
- (United Kingdom) C. Martineau —Esher—(1)
- (United Kingdom) Spencer Cox—Exeter—(1)
- (United Kingdom) E. W. Mancounchy—Exmouth—(1)
- (Ireland) Edmond Bennett Brackenbury—Limerick—(1)
- (Scotland) Herbert Lawford—London—(1)
- (United Kingdom) Frederick Lawrence Rawson—London—(1)
- (United Kingdom) Richard Mercer—Maidstone—(1)
- (Australia) Louis Whyte—Melbourne—(1)
- (Ireland) Peter Aungier—Naas—(1)
- (Ireland) John Jameson Cairnes -New York -(1)
- (United Kingdom) A.W. Soames-St Leonards-on-Sea-(1)
- (England) Jonas Henry William Gardner-Stafford-(1)
- (United Kingdom) Champion Branfill Russell—Teignmouth—(1)
- (England) Ernest Maconchy-Torquay-(1)
- (Canada) Isidore F. Hellmuth—Toronto—(1)
- (United Kingdom) Wilfred Milne—Weybridge—(1)

== See also ==
- 1881 Tennis Season
- 1881 in sports

== Sources ==
- A Social History of Tennis in Britain: Lake, Robert J. (2014), Volume 5 of Routledge Research in Sports History. Routledge, UK, ISBN 9781134445578.
- Ayre's Lawn Tennis Almanack And Tournament Guide, 1908 to 1938, A. Wallis Myers.
- British Lawn Tennis and Squash Magazine, 1948 to 1967, British Lawn Tennis Ltd, UK.
- Dunlop Lawn Tennis Almanack And Tournament Guide, G.P. Hughes, 1939 to 1958, Dunlop Sports Co. Ltd, UK
- Lawn tennis and Badminton Magazine, 1906 to 1973, UK.
- Lowe's Lawn Tennis Annuals and Compendia, Lowe, Sir F. Gordon, Eyre & Spottiswoode
- Spalding's Lawn Tennis Annuals from 1885 to 1922, American Sports Pub. Co, USA.
- Sports Around the World: History, Culture, and Practice, Nauright John and Parrish Charles, (2012), ABC-CLIO, Santa Barbara, Cal, US, ISBN 1598843001.
- The Concise History of Tennis, Mazak Karoly, (2010), 6th Edition, 2015.
- Tennis; A Cultural History, Gillmeister Heiner, (1997), Leicester University Press, Leicester, UK.
- The Tennis Book, edited by Michael Bartlett and Bob Gillen, Arbor House, New York, 1981 ISBN 0-87795-344-9
- The World of Tennis Annuals, Barrett John, 1970 to 2001.
- Total Tennis:The Ultimate Tennis Encyclopedia, by Bud Collins, Sport Classic Books, Toronto, Canada, ISBN 0-9731443-4-3
- Wright & Ditson Officially Adopted Lawn Tennis Guide's 1890 to 1920 Wright & Ditsons Publishers, Boston, Mass, USA.
- http://www.tennisarchives.com/1881 Men's Tennis season
- https://app.thetennisbase.com/1881 Men's Tennis season
