= 1882 women's tennis season =

1882 Women's tennis season
Details
- Duration: 29 April – 2 October
- Edition: 7th
- Tournaments: 54 (Amateur)
- Categories: Important (2); National (0); Provincial/Regional/State (4); County (13); Regular (36)

Achievements (singles)
- Most titles: (England) Mrs Hoare (2) (England) Edith Coleridge (2) (Ireland) May Langrishe(2) (England) Constance Smith (2)
- Most finals: (England) Constance Smith (3)

The 1882 Women's tennis season was a tennis circuit composed of 54 national, regional, county, and regular tournaments. The season began in April in Brighton, England, and ended in October in Brighton, England.

== Summary of season ==
Prior to the creation of the International Lawn Tennis Federation and the establishment of its world championship events in 1913 the Wimbledon Championships, the U.S. National Championships, the Irish Lawn Tennis Championships and the Northern Championships were considered by players and historians as the four most important tennis tournaments to win.

1882 sees a substantial increase in women's events as the tennis circuit continues to form. In May 1882 at the first major event of the year the Irish Championships in Dublin a full programme of women's singles and doubles were held, as well as a mixed doubles event. In the women's singles competition Ireland's Mary Abercrombie defeated England's Marian Bradley. In terms of draw size the East Gloucestershire Championships had the largest singles competition attracting 17 players. The West of England Championships and Northern Championships both had the largest doubles draws at 11 pairs a piece. Whilst the West of England Championships featured the largest mix doubles draw of any event at 32 players.

In June 1882 at the second major tournament of the year the Northern Championships the organisers staged a ladies singles championship for the first time won by Ireland's May Langrishe who defeated England's Miss Langley in straight sets. At the 1882 Wimbledon Championships the world's first major tennis tournament, it still remained an all men's event with no women's competitions being held. In North America at the U.S. National Championships there was still no women's championship events held. In 1913 the International Lawn Tennis Federation was created, that consisted of national member associations. The ILTF through its associated members then became responsible for supervising women's tour events.

== Season results ==
Notes 1: Challenge Round: the final round of a tournament, in which the winner of a single-elimination phase faces the previous year's champion, who plays only that one match. The challenge round was used in the early history of tennis (from 1877 through 1921), in some tournaments not all.

* Indicates challenger

Key

Important.
National
Provincial/State/Regional
County
Local

=== Singles ===
Notes:The Irish Championships and East Gloucestershire Championships used both grass and hard asphalt courts for matches.

Tournaments (40)
#	Date Ended	Tournament	Location	Surface	Winner	Finalist	Score
1.	27-May-1882	Brighton Lawn Tennis Club Tournament	Brighton	Grass	(England) Edith Coleridge	(England) Eva Adshead	6-1, 6–3, 6-0
2.	27-May-1882	Irish Championships	Dublin	Grass/Hard	(England) Mary Abercrombie	(England) Marion Bradley	6-4, 6-1
3.	29-May-1882	Armagh ALTC Tournament (I)	Armagh	Hard	(Ireland) Miss Teempler	?	won.
4.	3-Jun-1882	West of England Championships	Bath	Grass	(England) Frances Morris	(England) Gertrude Gibbs	6-4, 6-4
5.	15-Jun-1882	Mid Devon Lawn Tennis Tournament	Eggesford I	Grass	(England) Mrs. Hoare	?	won.
6.	15-Jun-1882	North Northamptonshire LTC Tournament	Grafton Underwood	Grass	(England) Miss F Hall	?	won.
7.	17-Jun-1882	Northern Championships	Liverpool	Grass	(Ireland) May Langrishe	(England) Miss Langley	6-3, 8-6
8.	25-Jun-1882	Mersey Bowmen Club Tournament	Aigburth	Grass	(United Kingdom) B. Fletcher	(England) K. Hill	drew
9.	1-Jul-1882	Waterloo Tournament	Liverpool II	Grass	(England) Edith Davies	(England) Miss. Eckersley	?
10.	1-Jul-1882	North Berkshire ALTC Tournament	Abingdon	Grass	(England) Miss. A. Binney	?	Won.
11.	5-Jul-1882	Abbot's Court Hoo Tournament	Hoo St Werburgh	Grass	(England) Miss. Stuart	?	Won.
12.	10-Jul-1882	Tonbridge Tournament	Tonbridge	Grass	(England) Miss. Cobbold	?	Won.
13.	13-Jul-1882	Henley Lawn Tennis Club Tournament	Henley-on-Thames	Grass	(England) M. Heathfield	(England) Miss. K. Millington	6-3, 3–6, 6-
14.	14-Jul-1882	Sittingbourne & Gore Court Ladies Open	Sittingbourne I	Grass	(England) L. Ray.	?	Won.
15.	18-Jul-1882	West Somersetshire Tournament	Taunton	Grass	(England) Miss. Scott	?	Won.
16.	19-Jul-1882	South Berkshire Tournament	Caversham	Grass	(England) C. Bennett	?	Won.
17.	22-Jul-1882	Staffordshire C.C.C. Tournament	Lichfield	Grass	(England) Miss. Gardner	(England) Mrs. Peters-Smith	6-3, 2–6, 6-2
18.	22-Jul-1882	Alliance LTC Championship	Crouch End Hill	Grass	(England) Miss. J. Mellish	?	Won.
19.	25-Jul-1882	Norwich Open Tournament	Norwich	Grass	(England) Miss Raikes	?	Won.
20.	26-Jul-1882	Portland Park LTCC Tournament	Newcastle upon Tyne	Grass	(England) Alice Fenwick	(England) Miss. Bowlby	6-4, 6-1
21.	27-Jul-1882	Armagh ALTC Tournament (II)	Armagh	Hard	(Ireland) J. M McLintock	?	Won.
22.	1-Aug-1882	County Kilkenny Tournament	Parsonstown I	Grass	(Ireland) May Langrishe	(Ireland) Beatrice Langrishe	Won.
23.	5-Aug-1882	South of Ireland Championships	Limerick	Grass	(Ireland) Mary Lysaght	(Ireland) Miss. Smith	6-3, 8-6
24.	7-Aug-1882	Darlington Open	Durham	Grass	(England) Constance Smith	(England) A. Turner	6-3, 6-0
25.	10-Aug-1882	Exmouth Tournament	Exmouth	Grass	(England) Lilian Cole	(England) Charlotte Taylor	6-4, 6-2
26.	11-Aug-1882	Penzance LTC Tournament	Penzance	Grass	(England) Miss M Jackson	?	Won
27.	11-Aug-1882	Mid Devon Lawn Tennis Tournament	Eggesford II	Grass	(England) Mrs. Hoare	?	won.
28.	15-Aug-1882	Seaton Lawn Tennis Tournament	Seaton	Grass	(England) Miss. Williams	?	Won.
29.	17-Aug-1882	South Berkshire Championship	Caversham	Grass	(England) Miss Hathway	?	Won.
30.	17-Aug-1882	Hornsea LTC Championship	Hornsea	Grass	(England) K. Gilliat	?	Won.
31.	19-Aug-1882	Tenby Lawn Tennis Club Tournament	Tenby	Grass	(Wales) G. Milman	(Wales) Ruth Sparrow	6-5, 6–5, 6-1
32.	22-Aug-1882	King's County and Ormonde Tournament	Parsonstown II	Grass	(Ireland) Miss. Maude	?	Won.
33.	25-Aug-1882	South of Scotland Championships	Moffat	Grass	(Scotland) A. Forrest	(Scotland) Miss. Bankier	?
34.	28-Aug-1882	Bedfordshire LTC Tournament	Bedford	Grass	(England) A. Lindsell	?	Won.
35.	30-Aug-1882	Gore Court Championships	Sittingbourne II	Grass	(England) Miss. D Patterson	?	Won.
36.	31-Aug-1882	East Grinstead Open	East Grinstead	Grass	(England) Mrs. Baddington	(England) May Arbuthnot	6-1, 6-5
37.	1-Sep-1882	Midland Counties Championships	Edgbaston	Grass	(England) Constance Smith	(England) Miss. Heaton	6-2, 6-1
38.	27-Sep-1882	South Orange Autumn Open	Montrose	Grass	(United States) Annie M. Miller	(United States) Mrs Gordon	6-4, 6-3
39.	2-Oct-1882	Sussex County Lawn Tennis Tournament	Brighton	Grass	(England) Edith Coleridge	(England) Florence Kemmis	5-6, 6–5, 6-2
40.	2-Oct-1882	Sussex County Lawn Tennis Tournament	Brighton	Grass	(England) Edith Coleridge	(England) Florence Kemmis	5-6, 6–5, 6-2

== Tournament winners ==
=== Singles ===
This is list of winners sorted by number of singles titles (major titles in bold)

- (Ireland) May Langrishe (**2**) **Northern Championships**, Parsonstown
- (England) Constance Smith (**2**) Durham, Edgbaston
- (England) Edith Coleridge (**2**) Brighton, Brighton II
- (England) Mrs. Hoare (**2**) Eggesford, Eggesford II
- (England) Mary Abercrombie (**1**) **Irish Championships**
- (England) A. Lindsell (**1**) Beford
- (England) Maud Watson (**1**) Cheltenham
- (Ireland) Miss Teempler (**1**) Armagh
- (England) Frances Morris (**1**) Bath
- (England) Miss F Hall (**1**) Grafton Underwood
- (United Kingdom) B. Fletcher (**1**) Aigburth
- (England) Miss. A. Binney (**1**) Abingdon
- (England) Miss. Stuart (**1**) Hoo St Werburgh
- (England) Miss. Cobbold (**1**) Tonbridge
- (England) M. Heathfield (**1**) Henley-on-Thames
- (England) L. Ray (**1**) Sittingbourne
- (England) C. Bennett (**1**) Caversham
- (England) Edith Davies (**1**) Liverpool II
- (England) Miss. Gardner (**1**) Lichfield
- (England) Miss. J. Mellish (**1**) Crouch End Hill
- (England) Miss Raikes (**1**) Norwich
- (England) Alice Fenwick (**1**) Newcastle-upon-Tyne
- (Ireland) J. M McLintock (**1**) Armagh II
- (Ireland) Mary Lysaght (**1**) Limerick
- (England) Lilian Cole (**1**) Exmouth
- (England) Miss M Jackson (**1**) Penzance
- (England) Miss. Williams (**1**) Seaton
- (England) Miss Hathway (**1**) Caversham II
- (England) K. Gilliat (**1**) Hornsea
- (Wales) G. Milman (**1**) Tenby
- (Ireland) Miss. Maude (**1**) Parsonstown II
- (Scotland) A. Forrest (**1**) Moffat
- (England) A. Lindsell (**1**) Bedford
- (England) Miss. D Patterson (**1**) Sittingbourne
- (England) Mrs. Baddington (**1**) East Grinstead
- (United States) Annie M. Miller (**1**) Montrose

=== Doubles ===
This is list of winners sorted by number of doubles titles (major titles in bold)

- (Ireland) Miss G McLintock & (Ireland) Miss Instray/ (Ireland) Miss J M Mclintock (**2**) Armagh, Armagh II *
- (England) Constance Smith & (Ireland) Beatrice Langrishe/ (England) Mrs Dent (**2**) Cheltenham, Edgbaston
- (Ireland) Miss G McLintock & (Ireland) Miss Instray (**1**) Armagh
- (Ireland) Miss J M Mclintock & (Ireland) Miss G McLintock (**1**) Armagh II
- (Ireland) Beatrice Langrishe & Constance Smith (**1**) Cheltenham
- (England) Constance Smith & (England) Mrs Dent (**1**) Edgbaston
- (United Kingdom) Miss Gardner & (United Kingdom) Mrs Peters-Smith (**1**) Litchfield
- (Scotland) A. Forrest & (Scotland) Miss Forrest (**1**) Moffat
- (United Kingdom) Miss M Bradshaw & (United Kingdom) Miss Eade (**1**) Newcastle-upon-Tyne
- (England) Miss Hartnell and (England) Miss Hick (**1**) Seaton
- (England) Miss Coles & (England) Miss Meyler (**1**) Taunton
- (England) Miss W Thomson & (United Kingdom) Mrs Agar (**1**) Weybridge
- (New Zealand) Miss Warren & (New Zealand) Miss Woolnough (**1**) Wellington

=== Mixed doubles ===
This is list of winners sorted by number of mixeddoubles titles (major titles in bold)

- (England) Maud Watson & (United Kingdom) Robert Wallace Braddell/ (England) Erksine Watson (**2**) Cheltenham, Leamington
- (England) Constance Smith & (England) Charles Smith (**1**) Edgbaston
- (England) Miss Wolde & (England) Mr J Mease (**1**) Armagh
- (United Kingdom) Mr B W Luxton & (United Kingdom) Mrs L Luxton (**1**) Eggesford
- (United Kingdom) H B Upcher & (England) Miss Dalton (**1**) Grafton Underwood
- (England) Miss Winckworth and (United Kingdom) Mr C Haynes (**1**) Hoo St. Werburgh
- (England) Miss Gorham & (England) Mr B Wadmore (1) Tonbridge
- (England) Maud Watson & (England) Erksine Watson (**1**) Leamington
- (United Kingdom) Captain Cooper & (United Kingdom) Miss F Scott (**1**) Taunton
- (United Kingdom) Mr W Yataman & (United Kingdom) Miss A Turner (**1**) Newcastle upon Tyne
- (Ireland) Miss M White & (Ireland) Mr F E K Bird (**1**) Naas
- (United Kingdom) Major Dashwood and (Ireland) Miss J M Mclintock (**1**) Armagh II
- (United Kingdom) Mr H Helme & (United Kingdom) Miss Richardson (**1**) Weybridge
- (United Kingdom) Mr J Boyd & (United Kingdom) Miss M Blencowe (**1**) Brackley
- (England) Miss Charlotte Taylor & (England) Charles Pine-Coffin (**1**) Exmouth
- (United Kingdom) J. W. Fowler & (United Kingdom) E. Cheese (**1**) Darlington
- (Ireland) Miss Lena Rice & (Ireland) Mr R J Power (**1**) Waterford
- (England) Miss E Hall & (England) Mr A Soames (**1**) Grafton Underwood II
- (Wales) Alice Bagnall-Wild & (England) P.J. Ash (**1**) Tenby
- (England) Miss A Belfield & (England) Mr H B Kindersley (**1**) Seaton
- (United Kingdom) Mr M S Constable & (United Kingdom) Miss Marriott (**1**) Hornsea
- (England) Mr A K Butterworth & (England) Miss E Walker (**1**) Esher
- (England) Mr M Huband & (England) Miss D Radcliffe (**1**) Tedworth
- (England) Mr S E Smith & (Ireland) Miss Bayly (**1**) Parsonstown
- (England) Miss F Percy & (England) Charles Pine-Coffin (**1**) Exeter
- (Scotland) Miss Hillier & (England) Arthur Fuller (**1**) Moffat
- (England) Miss Gorhamd & (England) William Neville Cobbold (**1**) East Grinstead
- (England) Maud Watson & (United Kingdom) Robert Wallace Braddell (**1**) Cheltenham
- (United Kingdom) Mrs Cobbold & (United Kingdom) Herbert Wilberforce (**1**) Brighton

== Statistical summary ==
=== Singles ===
- Total Tournaments: (40)
- Most Titles: (England) Edith Coleridge (3)
- Most Finals: (England) Constance Smith / (England) Edith Coleridge (3)
- Most Matches Played: (England) Constance Smith (11)
- Most Matches Won: (England) Constance Smith (9)
- Match Winning %: (England) Constance Smith (81.81%)
- Most Tournaments Played: (England) Constance Smith (4)

=== Doubles ===
- Total Tournaments: (15)
- Most Titles: (England) Constance Smith/ (Ireland) Miss G McLintock (2)
- Most Finals: (England) Constance Smith/ (Ireland) Miss G McLintock (2)
- Most Tournaments Played: (England) Constance Smith (4)

=== Mix doubles ===
- Total Tournaments: (29)
- Most Titles: (England) Maud Watson (2)
- Most Finals: (England) Maud Watson (2)
- Most Tournaments Played: (England) Maud Watson (3)
