= 1881 in sports =

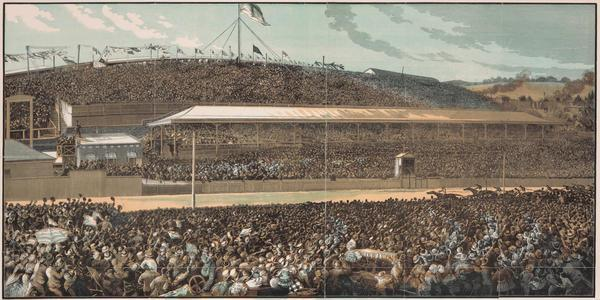
Engraving of the finish line at the 1881 Melbourne Cup

1881 in sports describes the year's events in world sports.

== Athletics ==
- USA Outdoor Track and Field Championships

== American football ==
College championship

- College football national championship – Yale Bulldogs

Events

- Michigan Wolverines is the first "western" team to travel east and play against the established teams at Harvard Crimson, Yale Bulldogs and Princeton Tigers.

== Association football ==
England

- FA Cup final – Old Carthusians 3–0 Old Etonians at The Oval in the last final to be played between two southern amateur sides.
- Blackburn Rovers and Bolton Wanderers both change their venues to enclosed grounds where gate money can be charged, an increasing practice among clubs that are openly (or otherwise) professional.
- Preston North End is founded and plays from the start at Deepdale, which holds the world record for the length of time a venue has been in continuous use by one major league club.
- Burnley FC founded as Burnley Rovers RUFC which decides in May 1882 to switch codes. The Rovers suffix is dropped two years later and the club renamed as Burnley AFC.
- Newcastle United, which has a complicated early history, is founded as Stanley FC by a cricket club in the Byker area of Newcastle.

France

- Foundation of FC Girondins de Bordeaux.

Ireland

- Moyola Park F.C. wins the inaugural Irish Cup final

Scotland

- Foundation of Berwick Rangers F.C.
- 12 March — Andrew Watson makes his Scotland debut, becoming the world's first black international football player
- Scottish Cup final – Queen's Park 3–1 Dumbarton at Hampden Park (replay after Dumbarton protests about the original match which Queen's Park has won 2–1)

== Baseball ==
National championship

- National League champions – Chicago White Stockings

Events

- Detroit replaces Cincinnati leaving Cleveland and Providence the southerly cities on the National League circuit. Four others lie on the northerly rail line from stalwart Chicago to stalwart Boston: Detroit, Buffalo, Troy, and Worcester.
- In autumn, for the first time, all eight National League clubs prepare to continue next season.

== Boxing ==
Events

- Paddy Ryan takes part in a number of exhibition bouts but does not defend his Heavyweight Championship of America title.
- John L. Sullivan continues his rise to the championship with a series of knockout victories, none of them lasting longer than eight rounds.

== Cricket ==
Events

- Lancashire County Cricket Club wins its first outright title. At the end of the season, an English team led by Alfred Shaw goes to Australia for the 1881–82 Test series.

England

- Champion County – Lancashire
- Most runs – A. N. Hornby 1,534 @ 40.36 (HS 188)
- Most wickets – Ted Peate 173 @ 12.68 (BB 8–30)

Australia

- Most runs – Tom Horan 318 @ 35.33 (HS 113)
- Most wickets – Edwin Evans 32 @ 11.25 (BB 5–34)

== Golf ==
Major tournaments

- British Open – Bob Ferguson

== Gymnastics ==
Events

- 23 July — the Federation Internationale de Gymnastique, the world's oldest international sport federation, is founded.

== Horse racing ==
England

- Grand National – Woodbrook
- 1,000 Guineas Stakes – Thebais
- 2,000 Guineas Stakes – Peregrine
- The Derby – Iroquois
- The Oaks – Thebais
- St. Leger Stakes – Iroquois

Australia

- Melbourne Cup – Zulu

Canada

- Queen's Plate – Vice Chancellor

Ireland

- Irish Grand National – Antoinette
- Irish Derby Stakes – Master Ned

USA

- Kentucky Derby – Hindoo
- Preakness Stakes – Saunterer
- Belmont Stakes – Saunterer

== Rowing ==
The Boat Race

- 8 April — Oxford wins the 38th Oxford and Cambridge Boat Race

== Rugby football ==
Events

- Wales plays its first international match but is well beaten by England

== Tennis ==
England

- Wimbledon Men's Singles Championship – William Renshaw (GB) defeated John Hartley (GB) 6–0 6–1 6–1

USA

- First U.S. National Singles Championship, precursor of the US Open, won by Richard D. Sears (USA) who defeats William E. Glyn (USA) 6–0 6–3 6–2

World

- The 6th pre-open era 1881 Men's Tennis season gets underway 65 tournaments are staged this year from 4 April to 10 November.

== Yacht racing ==
America's Cup

- The New York Yacht Club retains the America's Cup as Mischief defeats Canadian challenger Atalanta, of the Bay of Quinte Yacht Club
