= Crouch Hill =

Street in north London

Coordinates: 51°34′27″N 0°7′17″W

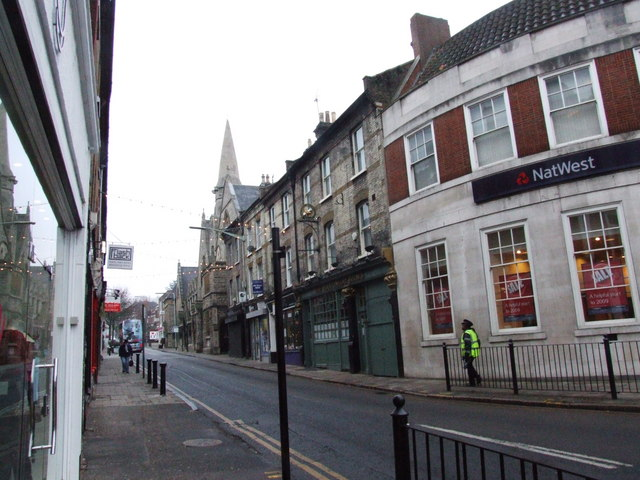
Crouch Hill

Crouch Hill is a street in north London, England, running between Crouch End and Stroud Green in the boroughs of Haringey and Islington. It is not to be confused with Crouch End Hill which runs between Crouch End and Hornsey Rise. (The two roads meet at a "y" junction in Crouch End and together the two routes constitute the southern access to Crouch End Broadway).

The street has a railway station of the same name on the Islington (south) slope of the hill, which is served by the Gospel Oak to Barking line. It is served by London Buses route W7.

== The Parkland Walk ==
Crouch Hill crosses over the Parkland Walk, a public foot and cycle path and linear park that stretches from Finsbury Park to Alexandra Palace, and follows some of the course of the Northern Heights planned rail extension to the Northern line, abandoned on 9 February 1954.

== Balcombe Street Siege ==
In 1974, rooms in a house on the Islington side of Crouch Hill were rented by IRA members who were subsequently arrested at the end of the Balcombe Street Siege.
