= 1881 Wimbledon Championship – Singles =

Singles
- 1881 Wimbledon Championship

Final
- Champion: (United Kingdom) William Renshaw
- Runner-up: (United Kingdom) John Hartley
- Score: 6–0, 6–1, 6–1

Details
- Draw: 48
- Seeds: –

Events
Singles
← 1880 ·	Wimbledon Championship	· 1882 →

William Renshaw defeated Richard Richardson 6–4, 6–2, 6–3 in the All Comers' Final, and then defeated the reigning champion John Hartley 6–0, 6–1, 6–1 in the challenge round to win the gentlemen's singles tennis title at the 1881 Wimbledon Championships.

== Draw ==
=== Key ===
- Q = Qualifier
- WC = Wild card
- LL = Lucky loser
- Alt = Alternate
- SE = Special exempt
- PR = Protected ranking
- ITF = ITF entry
- JE = Junior exempt
- w/o = Walkover
- r = Retired
- d = Defaulted
- SR = Special ranking

=== Challenge round ===
Challenge round
(United Kingdom) William Renshaw	6	6	6
(United Kingdom) John Hartley	0	1	1

=== All comers' finals ===
Quarterfinals
(United Kingdom) Otway Woodhouse	6	4	0	3
(United Kingdom) William Renshaw	4	6	6	6
(United Kingdom) Herbert Lawford	6	6	6
(United Kingdom) George S. Murray Hill	1	1	0
(United Kingdom) William Henry Darby	0	4	1
(United Kingdom) Richard Richardson	6	6	6

Semifinals
(United Kingdom) William Renshaw	1	6	6	5	6
(United Kingdom) Herbert Lawford	6	3	2	6	3
(United Kingdom) Richard Richardson
bye

Final
(United Kingdom) William Renshaw	6	6	6
(United Kingdom) Richard Richardson	4	2	3
Second Place
(United Kingdom) Herbert Lawford	3	6	1	6	5
(United Kingdom) Richard Richardson	6	4	6	3	6

=== Earlier rounds ===
==== Section 1 ====
First round
(United Kingdom) Mortimer Buckingham	6	6	6
(United Kingdom) Harry Grove	2	4	1
(United Kingdom) Otway Woodhouse	6	6	6
(United Kingdom) Hubert H. Wilkes	4	5	0
(United Kingdom) WM Bird	0	0^{r}
(United Kingdom) Wilfred Milne	6	5
(United Kingdom) Mr. Castor	6	6	2	6
(United Kingdom) Robert W. Braddell	5	3	6	4
(United Kingdom) William Renshaw	6	6	6
(United Kingdom) William J. Down	2	0	0
(United Kingdom) Thomas Gallwey	4	6	6	6
(United Kingdom) Arthur Stanley	6	3	5	4
(United Kingdom) C Cheales	w/o
(United Kingdom) BT Cotton
(United Kingdom) Edgar Lubbock	w/o
(United Kingdom) James Rankine

Second round
(United Kingdom) Mortimer D Buckingham	1	0	0
(United Kingdom) O Woodhouse	6	6	6
(United Kingdom) W. Milne	6	5	6	6
(United Kingdom) Castor	2	6	2	4
(United Kingdom) W Renshaw	6	6	6
(United Kingdom) T Gallwey	0	1	1
(United Kingdom) C Cheales	0	0	1
(United Kingdom) E Lubbock	6	6	6

Third round
(United Kingdom) O Woodhouse	6	6	6
(United Kingdom) W Milne	1	0	1
(United Kingdom) W Renshaw	6	6	6
(United Kingdom) E Lubbock	5	3	3

Quarterfinals
(United Kingdom) O Woodhouse	6	4	0	3
(United Kingdom) W Renshaw	4	6	6	6

==== Section 2 ====
First round
(United Kingdom) F Pollock	2	2	2
(United Kingdom) Champion Russell	6	6	6
(United Kingdom) HC Jenkins	w/o
(United Kingdom) R Pollock
(United Kingdom) WH Edward	6	6	6
(United Kingdom) JM Thornycroft	0	2	2
(United Kingdom) Herbert Lawford	6	6	6
(United Kingdom) CJ Cole	0	2	3
(United Kingdom) GS Murray-Hill	4	6	6	1	6
(United Kingdom) ES Saxton	6	1	1	6	4
(United Kingdom) A Keyser	6	6	6
(United Kingdom) C Wallis	3	5	2
(United Kingdom) Minden Fenwick	6	6	2	6
(United Kingdom) HR Hallward	3	2	6	4
(United Kingdom) Arthur Chitty	6	2	6	6
(United Kingdom) ML Hallward	2	6	5	4

Second round
(United Kingdom) Champion Russell	5	2	0
(United Kingdom) HC Jenkins	6	6	6
(United Kingdom) WH Edward	3	2	2
(United Kingdom) H Lawford	6	6	6
(United Kingdom) GS Murray-Hill	6	6	4	3	6
(United Kingdom) A Keyser	5	2	6	6	2
(United Kingdom) Minden Fenwick	6	2	6	0	6
(United Kingdom) A Chitty	3	6	5	6	1

Third round
(United Kingdom) HC Jenkins	4	3	0
(United Kingdom) H Lawford	6	6	6
(United Kingdom) GS Murray-Hill	6	2	6	6
(United Kingdom) Minden Fenwick	2	6	5	4

Quarterfinals
(United Kingdom) H Lawford	6	6	6
(United Kingdom) GS Murray-Hill	1	1	0

==== Section 3 ====
First round
(United Kingdom) Henry Mulholland	2	6	6	0
(United Kingdom) B Follett	6	3	1	0^{r}
(United Kingdom) WH Darby	6	6	6
(United Kingdom) FH Stokes	2	5	3
(United Kingdom) FL Rawson	w/o
(United Kingdom) George Montgomerie
(United Kingdom) Pollux	6	6	6
(United Kingdom) J Wilkes	3	4	4
(United Kingdom) Ernest Renshaw	6	6	6
(United Kingdom) John Galbraith Horn	2	2	4
(United Kingdom) JC Maxwell-Scott	6	1	6	6
(United Kingdom) HB Porter	5	6	4	3
(United Kingdom) Michael G. McNamara	6	6	6
(United Kingdom) William Taylor	2	4	1
(United Kingdom) AH Cochran	0	1	2
(United Kingdom) Richard Richardson	6	6	6

Second round
(United Kingdom) H Mulholland	3	5	2
(United Kingdom) WH Darby	6	6	6
(United Kingdom) FL Rawson	5	4	0^{r}
(United Kingdom) Pollux	6	6	0
(United Kingdom) E Renshaw	6	6	6
(United Kingdom) JC Maxwell-Scott	0	0	3
(United Kingdom) MG MacNamara	2	1	2
(United Kingdom) R Richardson	6	6	6

Third round
(United Kingdom) WH Darby	6	6	0	6
(United Kingdom) Pollux	5	5	6	3
(United Kingdom) E Renshaw	6	5	4	5
(United Kingdom) R Richardson	2	6	6	6

Quarterfinals
(United Kingdom) WH Darby	0	4	1
(United Kingdom) R Richardson	6	6	6
