= Rochford Hundred Club Lawn Tennis Tournament =

Rochford Hundred Club Lawn Tennis Tournament[

Defunct tennis tournament
- Founded: 1881; 144 years ago
- Abolished: 1886; 139 years ago
- Location: Rochford, Essex, England.
- Venue: Rochford Hundred Club
- Surface: Grass

The Rochford Hundred Club Lawn Tennis Tournament was a late Victorian era men's and women's grass court tennis tournament founded in 1881. It was organised by the Rochford Hundred Club, and played at the Rochford Hundred Cricket Club grounds, Rochford, Essex, England. Later editions were played at Southend Park, Southend-on-Sea, Essex. The tournament ran till 1886.

== History ==
The Rochford Hundred Club Lawn Tennis Tournament was an late 19th century grass court tennis tournament founded in August 1881 at the Rochford Hundred Cricket Club grounds, South-on-Sea, Essex, England. Later editions were played at Southend Park, South-on-Sea, Essex, England. The tournament ran till 1886. The Rochford Hundred Club that consisted of the Rochford Hundred Cricket Club and Rochford Hundred Lawn Tennis Club, and played at the Rochford Hundred Cricket Club grounds.

== Finals ==
=== Men's singles ===
(incomplete roll)

- 1881— (United Kingdom) M. Thackeray def. (United Kingdom) W. Wood, 6–3, 4–6, 6–5.
- 1882— (United Kingdom) E. Meeson def. (United Kingdom) W. Meggy, 6–3, 6–5.

=== Men's doubles ===
(incomplete roll)

- 1881— (United Kingdom) J.C. Page & (United Kingdom) M. Thackeray def. (United Kingdom) R.C. Browne & (United Kingdom) Mr. Keightley, 6–3, 6–3, 4–6, 6–5.
- 1882— (United Kingdom) R.C. Browne & (United Kingdom) M. Thackeray def. (United Kingdom) C. Blake & (United Kingdom) W. Wood, 6–5, 4–6, 6–3,
