= Westgate-on-Sea Tournament =

Defunct tennis tournament
- Founded: 1881
- Abolished: 1938
- Location: St. Mildred's Courts, St. Mildreds Bay, Westgate-on-Sea, Kent, England.
- Venue: Westgate-on-Sea LTC
- Surface: Hard (asphalt)

The Westgate-on-Sea Tournament also known as the St. Mildred's Tournament was a men's and women's hard asphalt court tennis tournament founded in 1881 at the Westgate-on-Sea Lawn Tennis Club, St. Mildred's Courts, St. Mildreds Bay, Westgate-on-Sea, Kent, England. The tournament ran annually until 1938 before the start of World War II.

== History ==
The Westgate-on-Sea Tournament was a men's and women's annual tennis tournament founded in 1881 that continued to stage events through until 1938. The winner of the inaugural tournament was held from 9 to 13 September that year with men's singles being won by Mr. G. G. Dineley. The men's doubles was won by Mr. T. Sopwith and Mr. S. Winkley. In 1938 the final edition of this tournament was played from 22 to 27 August. The final men's singles event was by John Olliff.

== Finals ==

The image right taken in 2008 is St Mildred's Bay. The built up area center right is St. Mildred's Gardens, and slightly to the upper left of center, you can see the Westgate-on-Sea tennis courts site of the old St. Mildred's courts, the courts today are made from hard cement with a tarmac surface.

=== Men's Singles ===
Incomplete Roll

Year	Winner	Runner-up	Score
1881.	(United Kingdom) G. G. Dineley	(United Kingdom) T. Sopwith	?
1905.	(United Kingdom) Philip Rufford Hewlett	(United Kingdom) Henry Biddle	6–4, 6–4
1908.	(United Kingdom) Henry Biddle	(United Kingdom) A.P. Twigg	6–8, 7–5, 6–3
1921.	(United Kingdom) Hugh Cyril Eltringham	(United Kingdom) Norman Dicks	6–4, 1–6, 6–4, 6–1
1922.	(South Africa) Gerald Sherwell	(Australia) Basil Henty	6–2, 6–4, 7–5
1923.	(South Africa) Gerald Sherwell	(United Kingdom) Hugh Cyril Eltringham	6–3, 3–6, 9–7
1932.	(United Kingdom) Henry Billington		?
1933.	(United Kingdom) Patrick Sherwood	(United Kingdom) Guy I. Pettigrew	?
1935.	(United Kingdom) Patrick Sherwood	(United Kingdom) H.D. Nicholson	6–2, 6–1
1936.	(United Kingdom) Patrick Sherwood	(United Kingdom) John A.S. Collins	6–4, 3–6, 8–6
1937.	(United Kingdom) John Olliff	(United Kingdom) John A.S. Collins	3–6, 6–4, 6–3
1938.	(United Kingdom) John Olliff	(United Kingdom) Algernon Kingscote	7–5, 6–3

=== Men's Doubles ===
Year	Winner	Runner-up	Score
1881.	(United Kingdom) T. Sopwith (United Kingdom) S. Winkley	(United Kingdom) G.G. Dineley (United Kingdom) E. Warren	def.

=== Women's singles (spring) ===
Incomplete Roll

Year	Winner	Runner-up	Score
1927	(United Kingdom) Mrs Morison	(United Kingdom) Peggy Ingram Bouverie	6-4, 8-6
1928	(United Kingdom) F B Hensman	(United Kingdom) Mrs A M B Foreshew	6-2, 6-1
1929	(United Kingdom) Madeleine Pearson	(United Kingdom) Agnes Steer-Watkins	6–3, 6-3
1930	(United Kingdom) Aurea Edgington	(United Kingdom) Joan Ingram	6-1, 6-0
1932	(United Kingdom) Betty Holly	(United Kingdom) Alexandra McOstrich	6-3, 3–6, 6-3

=== Women's Singles (Summer) ===
Year	Winner	Runner-up	Score
1922	(United Kingdom) Mrs Fletcher	(United Kingdom) M E Pilcher	4–6, 6–1, 6–0
1923	(United Kingdom) Joan Austin	(United Kingdom) Joan Reid-Thomas	8–6, 7–5
1924	(United Kingdom) Joan Reid-Thomas	(United Kingdom) M Coles	6–1, 6–4
1925	(United Kingdom) E. Kelsey	(United Kingdom) Betty Nuthall	1–6, 8–6, 6–2
1926	(United Kingdom) Dorothy Holman	(United Kingdom) Peggy Ingram Bouverie	6–1, 6–3
1927	(United Kingdom) Nancy Lyle	(United Kingdom) Mrs MacLeod	6–4, 2–6, 6–3
1928	(United Kingdom) Joan Ridley	(United Kingdom) Nancy Lyle	6–4, 6–1
1929	(United Kingdom) Nancy Lyle	(United Kingdom) Alida Klemantaski	6–0, 6–4
1930	(United Kingdom) Joan Ingram	(United Kingdom) Agnes Steer-Watkins	6–1, 6–2
1931	(United Kingdom) Jeanette Morfey	(United Kingdom) Alida Klemantaski	6–4, 6–2
1932	(United Kingdom) Madge Valantine List	(United Kingdom) Olga Greenwood	6–4, 6–4
1933	(United Kingdom) Sheila Chuter	(United Kingdom) W E Murphy	7–5, 6–2
1935	(United Kingdom) Gladys Southwell	(United Kingdom) J M Notley	3–6, 6–4, 6–2
1937	(United Kingdom) G F Mathias	(United Kingdom) Alida Taylor	6–1, 6–3
1938	(United Kingdom) Barbara Costerton	(United Kingdom) G F Mathias	6–4, 6–3

=== Mix Doubles ===
Year	Winner	Runner-up	Score
1881.	(United Kingdom) T. Sopwith (United Kingdom) Miss A. Townsend	(United Kingdom) Mr. C. Leigh Clare (United Kingdom) Miss. I. Bouverie	def.

== Notes ==
This tournament in some other sources is known as the St. Mildreds Tournament Westgate on Sea.

== Sources ==
- Routledges Sporting Annual (1882) George Routledge and Son. London.
- Thanet Advertiser. (17 April 1930) Thanet, Kent, England.
- Thanet Advertiser. (8 September 1933) Thanet, Kent, England.
