= Dundalk Tournament =

Defunct tennis tournament
- Founded: 1881; 144 years ago
- Abolished: 1884; 141 years ago
- Location: Dundalk, County Louth, Ireland
- Venue: Dundalk Cricket Grounds
- Surface: Grass

The Dundalk Tournament was a late Victorian era Irish grass court tennis tournament organised by the Dundalk Tennis Club, and played at the cricket field of the Dundalk Grammar School, Dundalk, County Louth, Ireland. from 1881 to 1884.

== History ==
The Dundalk Tournament was a late 19th century tennis event first staged in late July 1881, at the cricket field of the Dundalk Grammar School, Dundalk, County Louth, Ireland. The first recorded winner of the men's singles was Ireland's Robert Shaw Templer. The final known edition was in 1884.

== Finals ==
=== Men's Singles ===
(Incomplete roll)

- 1881— (Ireland) Robert Shaw Templer def. (Ireland) Kerry Leyne Supple, 2 sets to 1.
