= St. George's Cricket Club Invitation =

Defunct tennis tournament
- Founded: 1881; 144 years ago
- Abolished: 1899; 126 years ago
- Location: Hoboken, New Jersey, United States
- Venue: St. George's Cricket Club
- Surface: Grass

The St. George's Cricket Club Invitation was a late 19th century men's international grass court tennis tournament first held on courts at the St. George's Cricket Club, Hoboken, New Jersey, United States, in 1881. The event was staged to at least 1899, when it had become an invitational tournament.

== History ==
The St. George's Cricket Club Tournament was a late 19th century tennis event first staged in 1881 at the St. George's Cricket Club, Hoboken, New Jersey, USA.

The tournament was initially open to all comers, however by the turn of the twentieth century it was by invitation of the club. The first winner of the men's singles was Ireland's John J. Cairnes. The final known men's edition in 1886 was won by American player Robert Livingston Beeckman. It was a regular annual event for three years on the men's U.S.N.L.T.A lawn tennis seasons.

== Finals ==
=== Men's Singles ===
Year	Winner	Runner-up	Score
1881	(Ireland) John Jameson Cairnes	(United States) James Rankine	7-5, 6–2, 6-3
1882	(United States) Alexander Van Rensselaer	(United States) S. Williams	6-0, 5–6, 6–1, 6-5
1883	(United States) Clarence Clark	(United Kingdom) William Edward Glyn	6-0, 6–4, 8-6
1886	(United States) Robert Livingston Beeckman	(United States) Henry Slocum	?
