= 1881 Grand National =

English steeplechase horse race

- Grand National
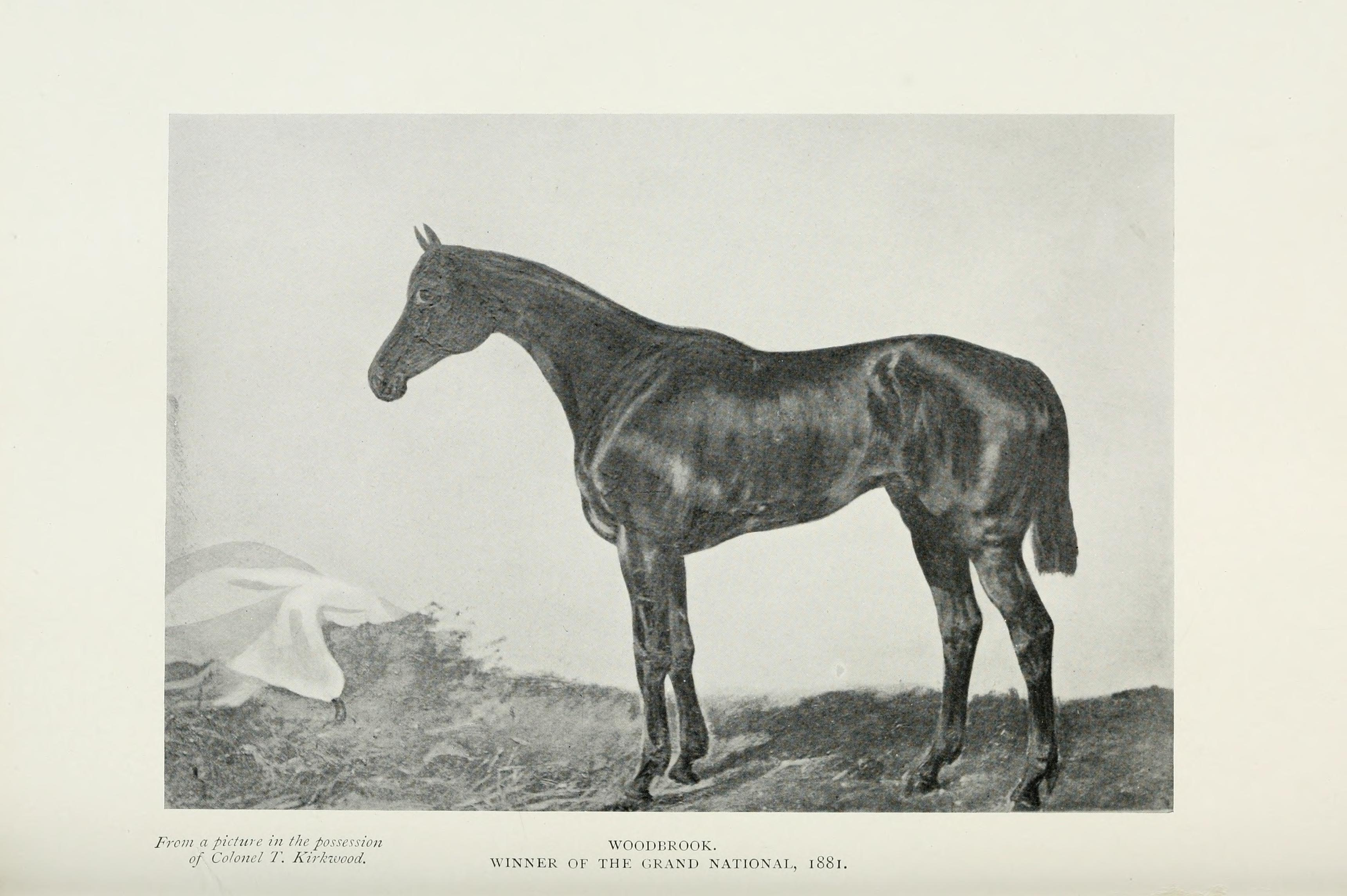
- Woodbrook (from Heroes and heroines of the Grand National)
- Location: Aintree
- Date: 25 March 1881
- Winning horse: Woodbrook
- Starting price: 11/2 JF
- Jockey: (Republic of Ireland) Mr Tommy Beasley
- Trainer: (Republic of Ireland) Henry Linde
- Owner: T. Kirkwood
- Conditions: Heavy

The 1881 Grand National was the 43rd renewal of the Grand National horse race that took place at Aintree near Liverpool, England, on 25 March 1881.

== Finishing Order ==
Position	Name	Jockey	Handicap (st-lb)	SP	Distance
01	Woodbrook	Tommy Beasley	11-3	6-1	4 Lengths
02	Regal	James Jewitt	11-12	11-1	
03	Thornfield	Richard Marsh	10-9	11-2	
04	New Glasgow	Arthur Smith	10-7	11-1	
05	The Scot	Fred Webb	10-0	25-1	
06	Abbot of St Mary's	Jimmy Adams	10-9	8-1	
07	Cross Question	John Jones	10-0	100-15	
08	Montauban	Arthur Coventry	10-7	100-7	
09	The Liberator	Garry Moore	12-7	100-15	Last to complete

== Non-finishers ==
Fence	Name	Jockey	Handicap (st-lb)	SP	Fate
19+	Fair Wind	Harry Beasley	10-13	100-7	Fell
02	Little Prince	S Canavan	10-8	40-1	Refused
01	Fabius	William Hunt	10-0	25-1	Refused
01	Buridan	John Childs	10-0	40-1	Refused
