= White Rose Lawn Tennis Tournament =

Defunct tennis tournament
- Founded: 1881; 145 years ago
- Abolished: 1888; 138 years ago
- Location: York; Harrogate
- Venue: Yorkshire Gentlemen's Cricket Club; St George's Road Cricket Ground, Harrogate
- Surface: Grass

The White Rose Lawn Tennis Tournament was a late-Victorian-era grass-court tennis tournament first staged in 1881 at the Yorkshire Gentlemen's Cricket Club ground in York, Yorkshire, England. In 1887, the tournament moved to Harrogate, where it remained until it was discontinued in 1888.

== History ==
The White Rose Lawn Tennis Tournament was a grass-court tennis tournament founded in September 1881 and staged at the Yorkshire Gentlemen's Cricket Club ground in York, Yorkshire, England. In August 1887, the event was moved to Harrogate, North Yorkshire, for the remainder of its run. It was discontinued in 1888 after being featured as part of the annual Harrogate Flower Show.

== Venues ==
The Yorkshire Gentlemen's Cricket Club was founded in 1863, and its grounds were based at Wigginton Road, York. In 1932, the club moved to Escrick, six miles south of York, which has remained its home ever since. In 1887, the tournament was moved to St George's Road Cricket Ground, Harrogate.

== Finals ==
=== Men's Singles ===
(Incomplete roll)

Year	Winner	Runner-up	Score
1881	(United Kingdom) Elliot M. Turner	(United Kingdom) A. Hotham	6-4, 6–5.

=== Mix doubles ===
(Incomplete roll)

Year	Winner	Runner-up	Score
1881	(United Kingdom) Mr. Burke (United Kingdom) Miss. Smith	(United Kingdom) A. Hotham (United Kingdom) Miss. Smith	def.
