= Hampstead Cricket Club Lawn Tennis Section Tournament =

Defunct tennis tournament
- Tour: ILTF
- Founded: 1881; 144 years ago
- Abolished: 1939; 86 years ago
- Location: Hampstead, Middlesex, England
- Venue: Hampstead Cricket Club Lawn Tennis Section
- Surface: Hard

The Hampstead Cricket Club Lawn Tennis Section Tournament was a men's and women's hard court) tennis tournament founded in 1881 at the Hampstead Cricket Club, Middlesex, England. The tournament ran annually until 1939 when it was discontinued due to World War II.

== History ==
Hampstead Cricket Club Lawn Tennis Section Tournament was established in 1881 when the tennis section of the Hampstead Cricket Club staged its first tournament. The tournament was held on hard courts, and was held annually through till 1939, when it was abolished due to World War II.

Former winners of the men's singles title include Harry Sibthorpe Barlow and Herbert Chipp.
