= Champion Russell =

English tennis player (1860–1945)

- Full name: Champion Branfill Russell
- Country (sports): GBR
- Born: April 1860; North Ockendon, Essex, England
- Died: 8 September 1945; Romford, Essex, England.
- Turned pro: 1880 (amateur tour)
- Retired: 1888

Singles
- Career record: 40/28
- Career titles: 2

Grand Slam singles results
- Wimbledon: 2R (1881)

Champion Branfill Russell (April 1860 – 8 September 1945) was an English tennis player in the later half of the 19th century. In the most notable tournaments of the time he reached the second round of the 1881 Wimbledon Championships, and in 1883 was a finalist at the Northern Championships. He was active from 1880 to 1888 and he contested 5 career finals won 2 titles.

== Career ==
Champion played his first tournament at the Essex County Cricket Club Tournament at Leyton, Essex in 1880. The same year he then reached his first event final at the Leicester Lawn Tennis Club Tournament, in Leicester where he lost to Stuart Macrae. In June 1881 he won his first title at the Victoria Park Lawn Tennis Tournament at Exeter against Spencer Cox. In July 1881 he took part in the Wimbledon Championships where he reached the second round before losing to HC Jenkins.

In the late summer of 1881 he won his second and final title at the Teignmouth Open in Teignmouth defeating Charles John Cole. In the autumn of 1881 he reached the final of the Sussex County Lawn Tennis Tournament that was played on outdoor asphalt courts at Brighton and Hove Rink, Brighton where he was beaten by Michael Gallwey McNamara. In 1883 at his second major tournament at the Northern Championships he defeated two time Wimbledon champion John Hartley in the semi-finals, before losing to Herbert Wilberforce in the final in four sets. In 1888 he played his last tournament at the Essex Championships at Chingford where he lost in the quarter-finals to FOS Reade.

== Personal ==
Champion B. Russell was born in North Ockendon, Essex, in April 1860 to Lt Col Champion Edward Branfill Russell and Emily Augusta Way. He was landowner and gentleman farmer by profession. Champion Branfill Russell married Isabel Ellen Bruce and had 6 children. He died on 8 September 1945 in Romford, Essex, England.
