= Alliance LTC Championship =

Defunct tennis tournament
- Founded: 1881
- Abolished: 1885
- Location: Crouch End Hill, Crouch End, London, England.
- Venue: Alliance Lawn Tennis Club
- Surface: Grass

The Alliance LTC Championship was a late Victorian period men's and women's grass court tennis tournament founded in 1881. It was organised by the Alliance Lawn Tennis Club and held at Crouch End Hill, Crouch End, London, England. The championship was staged for three editions only until 1885.

== History ==
The Alliance Lawn Tennis Club appears to have been formed around 1879/80, though records of its existence are scarce. In 1881 the club staged its championship event of which the gentleman's singles was won by Mr. F.A. Clark. In 1882 the club also staged other tournaments that year together with this championship.

On 31 May 1882 the Alliance LTC Club Tournament concluded consisting of scratch pairs for Gentlemen, and played at Crouch End Hill, won by Mr. F. Clark and Mr. C. Kestin.

On 26 June 1882 it staged another Alliance LTC Tournament, this time a handicap event for pairs was concluded won by C. Smith and F. Jerson. On 22 July the club staged the Alliance LTC Championship, the Ladies Championship was won by Miss. J. Mellish, and the Gentlemen's Championship was won by Mr. F.A. Clark who defeated Mr. F.H. Jerson in the challenge round.

In August 1885 the Alliance LTC Championship was held for the final time, in the men's singles Mr. F.A. Clark retained the title for the fourth time beating challenger *Mr. R.G. Bailey.

== Finals ==
=== Men's singles ===
(incomplete roll)

| Year | Champion | Runner up | Score |
|---|---|---|---|
| 1881 | (England) F.A. Clark | (England) ? | Won. |
| 1882 | (England) F.A. Clark (2) | (England) F.H. Jerson | 6–2, 6–3, 6–4 |
| 1883 | (England) F.A. Clark (3) | (England) R.G. Bailey | 6–1, 6–4, 6–4 |
| 1885 | (England) F.A. Clark (5) | (England) R.G. Bailey | 6–1, 7–5, 8–6 |

=== Women's singles ===
(incomplete roll)

| Year | Champion | Runner up | Score |
|---|---|---|---|
| 1882 | (England) Miss. J. Mellish | (England) ? | Won. |

== Notes ==
Challenge Round: the final round of a tournament, in which the winner of a single-elimination phase faces the previous year's champion, who plays only that one match. The challenge round was used in the early history of tennis (from 1877 through 1921), in some tournaments not all.

* Indicates challenger
