= Aldershot Division Open =

Defunct tennis tournament
- Tour: ILTF
- Founded: 1879; 146 years ago
- Abolished: 1885; 140 years ago
- Editions: 7
- Location: Aldershot Garrison, Hampshire, England
- Venue: Aldershot Divisional LTC
- Surface: Grass

The Aldershot Division Open was a late Victorian era men's grass court founded in 1879. The tournament ran until 1885 before it was discontinued.

== History ==
The Aldershot Division Open Tournament were established in 1879. The tournament was staged at the Aldershot Divisional LTC, Aldershot Garrison, Hampshire, England. This military sports tournament organised by the Aldershot Division of the British Army was an open competition for serving officers of the division, and civilian amateur tennis players. The tournament ran for just seven editions before it was abolished in 1885.

=== Men's Singles ===
Year	Winner	Runner-up	Score
1881	(United Kingdom) Lt-Col Robert Holt Stuart Truell	(United Kingdom) Lieut. Robert Howden Kellie.	6–4, 1–6, 6–5.
1885	(United Kingdom) Lieut. D. Bligh	(United Kingdom) Lieut. R. Jones.	2–1 sets.

=== Women's Singles ===
Year	Winner	Runner-up	Score
1881	(United Kingdom) Miss Draper	(United Kingdom) Miss Pritchard	2–0 sets.
