= Victoria Park Lawn Tennis Tournament =

Defunct tennis tournament
- Tour: Amateur / Pre-Open Era
- Founded: 1881
- Abolished: 1885
- Editions: 5
- Location: Mount Radford, Exeter, Devon, England
- Venue: Victoria Park Lawn Tennis Club
- Surface: Grass

The Victoria Park Lawn Tennis Tournament also called the Victoria Park LTC Tournament was an early Victorian era men's and women's grass court tennis tournament first staged in June 1881 at the Victoria Park Lawn Tennis Club, Exeter, Devon, England. It was staged five times until 1885.

== History ==
The Victoria Park Lawn Tennis Tournament, was an early open men's and women's grass court tennis tournament first staged in 1881 at the Victoria Park Lawn Tennis Club, Mount Radford, Exeter, Devon, England, The first edition was held between 29 and 31 August 1881, the men's singles was won by Mr. Champion Branfill Russell. The men's singles champion of the third edition (held from 7 to 9 September 1883) was Mr. Charles Walder Grinstead, the All-Comers' finalist at Wimbledon a year later.

== Sources ==
- Exeter and Plymouth Gazette Daily Telegrams (September 1881) Exeter, Devon. England.
- Exeter and Plymouth Gazette Daily Telegrams (31 July 1884) Exeter, Devon. England.
- Nieuwland, Alex. "Tournament – Exeter". www.tennisarchives.com. Tennis Archives.
- Routledges Sporting Annual (1882) George Routledge and Son. London.
- Routledges Sporting Annual (1883) George Routledge and Son. London.
