= John Comber =

English cricketer

Personal information
- Full name: John Howard Comber
- Born: 8 January 1861; Brighton, Sussex, England
- Died: 1903; Lowell, Massachusetts, US
- Batting: Unknown
- Bowling: Unknown

Domestic team information
- Years: Team
- 1885: Sussex

Career statistics
Competition	First-class
Matches	3
Runs scored	28
Batting average	5.60
100s/50s	–/–
Top score	8
Balls bowled	44
Wickets	–
Bowling average	–
5 wickets in innings	–
10 wickets in match	–
Best bowling	–
Catches/stumpings	–/–
- Source: Cricinfo, 15 December 2011

John Howard Comber (8 January 1861 – 1903) was an English cricketer. Comber's batting and bowling style is unknown. He was born at Brighton, Sussex and died at Lowell, Massachusetts.

Comber made his first-class debut for Sussex against Kent at Bat and Ball Ground, Gravesend in 1885. He made two further first-class appearances for Sussex that season, against Hampshire at the County Ground, Southampton and Gloucestershire at the College Ground, Cheltenham. He struggled in his three first-class matches, scoring just 28 runs at an average of 5.60, with a high score of 8.

At some point later in his life he moved to the United States where in 1892 he is recorded as an "overseer" in his marriage to Lucy Johnson in Lowell, Massachusetts; they had a daughter, also Lucy, in 1895. He featured in a match for Massachusetts against Lord Hawke's XI in 1894. He died in 1903, but the precise date of death is not known.
