= Harrow Lawn Tennis Club Tournament =

Defunct tennis tournament
- Founded: 1880; 145 years ago
- Abolished: 1887; 138 years ago
- Location: Harrow on the Hill, Middlesex, England
- Venue: Harrow School Grounds
- Surface: Grass

The Harrow Lawn Tennis Club Tournament was a late Victorian era men's grass court tennis tournament organised by the Harrow Lawn Tennis Club, and played at the grounds of the Harrow School, Harrow on the Hill, Middlesex, England from 1881 to 1887.

== History ==
The Harrow Lawn Tennis Club Tournament was a late 19th century tennis event first staged around June 1881, at Norham Gardens, Oxford, Oxfordshire, England. It was a closed tournament for current or former students of Oxford University. The first recorded winner of the men's singles was Englands's Frederick Gordon Templer. Templer competed at the 1880 Wimbledon Championships where he was beaten in the first round by Ernest Renshaw. The final known edition was in 1888 that was won by England's Harry Stanley Scrivener.

== Finals ==
=== Men's Singles ===
(Incomplete roll)

- 1881— (England) Frederick Gordon Templer def. (England) J. Ruault, 2 sets to 1 .

== Venue ==
The Harrow Lawn Tennis Club was founded in 1880, three years after the first championships at the All England Lawn Tennis and Croquet Club in 1877. The Harrow School leases its 12 courts and a small pavilion within its beautiful grounds to our club. The courts are named The Beckwith Courts after two Old Harrovians, Peter and Sir John Beckwith, brothers.
