= Thomas Braddell =

British colonial lawyer, attorney-general, and administrator

Sir Thomas Braddell CMG FRGS
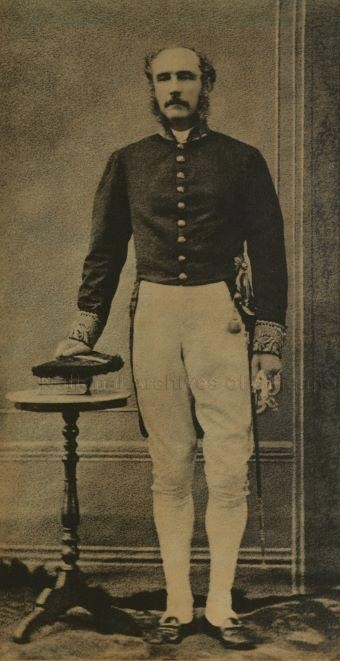

Acting Colonial Secretary of Straits Settlements
- In office 1874–1875
- Monarch: Queen Victoria
- Governor: Andrew Clarke
- Preceded by: James W. W. Birch
- Succeeded by: William Willans (Acting)

Attorney-General of Singapore
- In office 1 April 1867 – 1 January 1883
- Preceded by: new position
- Succeeded by: John Augustus Harwood

Personal details
- Born: 30 January 1823 Rahingrany, County Wicklow, Ireland
- Died: 19 September 1891 (aged 68) South Kensington, London, England
- Spouse: Anne Lee (m. 1852–1891)
- Relations: Sir Edward Marsh Merewether (son-in-law)
- Children: Sir Thomas de Multon Lee Braddell (son), Robert Wallace Braddell (son), Honoria Clementina Mary Braddell (daughter) and another daughter
- Relatives: Rev. Henry Braddell (grandfather); Roland St John Braddell (grandson)

Sir Thomas Braddell CMG FRGS (30 January 1823 – 19 September 1891) was an Irish lawyer, the first Attorney-General of the British Colony of Singapore.

He was born in Rahingrany, County Wicklow and called to the bar at Gray's Inn in 1859. He took the role of Attorney-General of Singapore from 1 April 1867 to 1 January 1883. In 1883, his son Thomas de Multon Lee Braddell was himself attorney-general and, with his brother Robert Wallace Glen Lee Braddell founded the Singapore legal firm of Braddell Brothers.

In the 1850s, he published historical works on the early settlement of Singapore in the Journal of the Indian Archipelago.

== Early years ==
Thomas Braddell, C.M.G., F.R.G.S., F.E.S.L., was born on 30 January 1823 at Raheengraney, County Wicklow, the property of his grandfather, the Rev. Henry Braddell, M.A., Rector of Carnew, County Wicklow.

=== Sugar planter ===
At the age of nearly seventeen he went to Demerara with his brother, George William Braddell, to learn sugar planting. The brother died there in 1840, and in 1844 Thomas Braddell arrived at Penang from Demerara to manage the sugar estate called Otaheite, in the Ayer Hitam Valley, which belonged to Messrs. Brown and Co. About this time a great impetus had been given to the sugar industry in the Straits by the new sugar duties, with the result that in 1846 Brown and Co. opened the Batu Kawan Estate, in Province Wellesley, of which Thomas Braddell became the manager and owner of one quarter; but the estate was inundated in a very high tide, the crop was lost, and the venture ended.

== Career ==
=== Public service in Penang ===
On 1 January 1849 Braddell joined the service of the East India Company as deputy superintendent of police at Penang. After holding various offices in Penang, the Province, and Malacca, he was promoted to the highest position which any uncovenanted servant of the company had ever held, that of assistant resident councillor, Penang, a post which had previously been held by a covenanted civilian or high military officer. He earned this promotion for an act which made him famous at the time, and gained him the quickest promotion in Government service then known. In 1854 the most serious clan riots ever known broke out in Singapore, and the feud spread to Malacca, where the Chinese broke out, took possession of the country parts, and built a stockade in one of the main roads, where they defied the police. Braddell, who was at that time stationed in Malacca, without the slightest assistance and without calling on the military, went out with all the police he could get together, attacked the Chinese, killed and wounded several of them, took the stockade, and summarily ended the riots, for which act he was publicly thanked by the Governor.

=== Barrister of Gray's Inn ===
He was not satisfied with his prospects in the company as an uncovenanted servant, and commenced to study for the Bar, a natural bent, seeing that from 1801 relatives of his had been at the Irish Bar. On 10 June 1859 he was called at Gray's Inn; in 1862 he resigned the company's service and went to Singapore, where he commenced practice in partnership with Abraham Logan, as Logan and Braddell.

=== Attorney-general, Singapore ===
In 1864 he was appointed as Crown Counsel, and when the Transfer took place was appointed Attorney-General in 1867, an office which he held until the end of 1882. In February 1858, Braddell had written a pamphlet entitled " Singapore and the Straits Settlements Described," because of the agitation then going on about the Transfer. In this pamphlet (which proved very useful and most opportune) he discussed the best way of governing and administering the Straits, and several of his suggestions were adopted. He wanted the Government of the Straits to be quite distinct from that of India, and that the sources from which the officials were derived should also be distinct. The pamphlet was a remarkable piece of constructive statesmanship, and showed his fitness for the high office to which he was appointed when his suggestions came to be put into practice. He was a most indefatigable worker, and used to sit up very late at night at his work.

=== Many hats: public servant, private practitioner, Malay scholar, historian ===
In addition to his various duties, he found or made time to become a fine Malay scholar, to write innumerable articles in Logan's Journal, and to collect material for a history of Singapore, which, however, he never actually wrote, but which was the foundation of Charles Burton Buckley's An Anecdotal History of Old Times in Singapore, and Braddell prompted Buckley to undertake that work. Thomas Braddell was certainly one of the busiest men of his day; his court practice (for the Attorney-General was allowed private practice at that time) was very large and lucrative, and his duties as Attorney-General were very heavy, but he always found time for public work. As Charles Burton Buckley put it in his history, "there are some who wonder why Mr. Braddell, who was a very busy man, should have spent so much time and taken so much trouble about the stories of this place; but he was one of those, like Mr. John Crawfurd, John Turnbull Thomson, George Windsor Earl, John Cameron (author of Our tropical possessions in Malayan India), and others, who were very willing to use their spare time in endeavouring to record the history of the place, the growing importance of which they foresaw and appreciated."

=== Andrew Clarke and the Pangkor Treaty ===
When Sir Andrew Clarke was sent out with orders to solve the problem of the Native States, he relied very strongly on Braddell, and appointed him Colonial Secretary and Secretary for Affairs relating to the Native States in 1875. To Thomas Braddell was due much of the success of the conference which concluded the Treaty of Pangkor in 1874, which Sir Andrew described as "the very best stroke of policy that has occurred since the British flag was seen in the Archipelago."

He was exceedingly popular with all the Malay chiefs and principal men, who used to come from all parts to consult him. Being a very fine Malay scholar and having a most courteous manner, he was able to exert great influence with them, the following instance of which is given in Sir Andrew Clarke's diary.

In February 1874 Sir Andrew Clarke, with Admiral Sir Charles Shadwell, went up to Selangor, and arrived at Langat, the residence of the Sultan of Selangor and the pirates' headquarters. The place was strongly fortified with big guns, and as Sir Andrew wrote in his diary, " the fort itself, both inside and outside, was covered with some hundreds of very villainous-looking Malays armed to the teeth." Major John Frederick Adolphus McNair, with a party, was sent ashore to ask the Sultan to come off and see His Excellency, but the Sultan refused, and Major McNair, after waiting three hours, returned, having effected nothing. Sir Andrew's diary then proceeds:

"Braddell, my Attorney-General, then landed alone, smoking a cigar, as if for a stroll, lounged through the bazaar and town, passed the sentries, and stepped quietly into the Sultan's palace. Braddell speaks Malay better than a Malay, and knows their customs. It ended in his getting at the Sultan, who at last consented to come on board."

== Braddell, the man ==
Of Braddell's personal qualities Charles Burton Buckley, who was his lifelong friend, speaks highly:

"He was a man of great quickness of perception, great energy of purpose, and unwearied industry. He was, in his comparatively younger days, when he first came to Singapore, one of the most popular men of the place. He was a capital billiard player, and was to be seen in the theatre when any travelling company gave performances there, which were poor enough; but he used to say that it passed an evening occasionally, however bad the players were, and made a little diversion from work.

"It was always pleasant to the jury to hear him conducting the cases at the Assizes, for he was most essentially a kind-hearted, straightforward man, with a very pleasant, perfectly audible voice, and a fluent but very simple speaker. He had a very pleasant face and manner, and it was said of him after the Transfer that he was the only official who could carry off the civil service uniform which came into use then among some, but not all, the officials, for he had a fine figure, and was over six feet in height."

== Later years ==
=== Mishap and retirement ===
Towards the end of 1882, Braddell had a nasty carriage accident, and as a consequence had to retire; he was entertained before his departure at a farewell dinner given by the Bar and the Civil Service, at which the chief justice, Sir Thomas Sidgreaves, took the chair, and the governor was present as a guest. All the members of council, heads of department, most of the civil service and all the bar were present, so the papers said. In proposing the toast of the evening, the chief justice said that the news of Braddell's retirement had been received with incredulity:

"One could hardly understand that Mr. Braddell, who had become a sort of institution here, whom everyone of us had known so long, who had become a part and parcel of the Colonial regime under which we all live, was going to leave us, that we were to lose the benefit of his assistance. It seemed as if a Colonial calamity was impending. Because I do not think there is anyone in the whole Colony who from his long residence and unselfish devotion to the public weal is so universally respected and whose absence will be more regretted."

=== Death and testimony ===
He died in London on 19 September 1891, at the age of sixty-eight. The Supreme Court assembled in Singapore to do honour to his memory, and speeches were made by the attorney-general, Jonas Daniel Vaughan, his old friend and colleague, and by the chief justice, Sir Edward L. O'Malley. The Singapore Free Press, in an obituary notice, remarked that there were very few institutions in this place which did not in some way, to those who were acquainted with their history, recall him, and that that was especially the case among the Masonic fraternity. It went on to refer to the fine work done by many of the old officials of the East India Company, and concluded : "Foremost amongst them stands the name of Mr. Braddell, who for thorough honesty of purpose and uprightness of character in somewhat trying official duties has left an honoured name in the history of the earlier days of Singapore." Mr. Braddell had filled all the offices connected with Freemasonry in his day, save that of District Grand Master, which was held by his friend, the late Mr. William Henry Macleod Read, whose deputy he was.

== Family ==
In 1852 he married Miss Anne Lee, the daughter of William Lee, of Long Eaton, in his day a well-known amateur cricketer who played for Nottinghamshire. By her he had two sons and two daughters; one of the daughter (Honoria Clementina Mary Braddell) married Sir Edward Marsh Merewether, K.C.V.O., K.C.M.G., then a cadet in the Straits Civil Service, and at present Governor of the Leeward Isles. They were on the Appam when she was captured by the Moewe, the German raider. She played a large part in theatricals and music while she was in Singapore.

=== Sir Thomas de Multon Lee Braddell ===
Of his sons the elder, Sir Thomas de Multon Lee Braddell, went out to Singapore in 1879, having been married a month or two before he sailed. He joined his father in practice. J. P. Joaquim and Sir John Bromhead Matthews were also partners of his, the former in the 'Eighties and the latter in the 'Nineties. Sir Thomas, while he was at the Bar, did not take any part in public affairs save when he acted as Attorney-General in 1898, and for a year or two prior to that as a Municipal Commissioner. In 1907 he was appointed a Puisne Judge, and in 1911 he became Attorney-General, holding that appointment until 1913, when he went to the Federated Malay States as Chief Judicial Commissioner. In the New Year's honours of 1914 he received a knighthood, and in 1917 he retired, and thereafter lived in England. Sir Thomas, like his father, was an enthusiastic Freemason, and in his time was Master of Lodge St. George and first Master of Read Lodge, Kuala Lumpur, holding the two offices by special dispensation in the same year; he was also District Grand Senior Warden.

Sir Thomas was an actor in his younger days, portraying General Baltic in Turned up, by Mark Melford, and Digby Grant in Two Roses, by James Albery. These were played at the old Town Hall in 1887 to great success. He also stage-managed Iolanthe, which started an era of musical plays in October 1889, and the Crimson Scarf, a comic opera by H. B. Farnie and J. E. Legouix, in 1888; also giving an evening a week to coach the elder pupils of Raffles Girls' School in their Shakespeare. He also played tennis, billiards, and was a supporter of the Swimming Club, which has a portrait of their former president in the club-house. All who knew him had the highest esteem for his fine character and sterling work. In Council and Court he was courteous in demean our and quiet in speech, yet withal firm and decisive. Privately, no one ever appealed to him in vain for advice or help, which he gave with great sincerity and kindness, in his quiet way, well meriting the verdict of one troubled lady whom he aided in a troublesome piece of public work that " he was such a helpful man."

Sir Thomas de Multon Lee Braddell was born in Province Wellesley on 25 November 1856, and after leaving Oxford was called to the Bar at the Inner Temple on 25 June 1879. On 16 September 1879 he married Violet Ida Nassau, daughter of John Roberts Kirby by his wife Elizabeth, who was the daughter of William Frederick Nassau, of St. Osyth's Priory, Essex. He was admitted to the local Bar on 5 January 1880. He died on 31 January 1927 after an influenza attack.

=== Robert Wallace Braddell ===
Robert Wallace Glen Lee Braddell was born in 1859, the younger son of Thomas Braddell, Robert Wallace, also came out to the Straits after his father's retirement and practised at the Singapore Bar in partnership with his brother. Sir Thomas, until December 1906, when he retired. He was the finest criminal lawyer and cross-examiner who has practised at the local Bar. Also " Bob " was an admirable caricaturist, much of his work being shown in illustrations herein, and under the nom de plume of "K.Y.D" had cartoons of Sir Cecil Smith, the Maharaja of Johore, and others published in the Vanity Fair series. Straits Produce contains much of his literary and artistic work. He shared the family taste for theatricals, and appeared in comic parts on many occasions, and could sing a good comic song. The company he founded with his brother Braddell Brothers is still operating today.

He republe for his skills as a billiard and lawn-tennis player, gaining the championship many times at both games. In three separate tournaments R. W. Braddell secured the championship, the singles handicap, the doubles handicap, and the Profession Pairs, i.e. every event. He and the Hon. F. M. Elliot carried off the Profession Pairs on many occasions.

He won his tennis half-blue at Oxford, and was an amateur lawn tennis plater. He won the Oxford University tournament in 1881, the same year he was also a losing finalist at the South of England Championships against Edgar Lubbock at Eastbourne . In 1882 he won the Sussex County Lawn Tennis Tournament spring event against Donald Stewart, the Warwickshire Championships against Teddy Williams, the Oxford and Cambridge Challenge Cup against Hubert H. Wilkes, and the East Gloucestershire Championships against Arthur Fuller. The same year he was also an All Comers Finalist at the Northern Championships in Liverpool losing to Ernest Renshaw.

He married Minnie, daughter of the Rev. Thomas Smith, vicar of Brailes, near Banbury. He died 24 March 1934.

== Bibliography ==
- Braddell, R. St.J (1983). The Law of the Straits Settlements: A Commentary. South East Asia: Oxford University Press. ISBN 0195825594.
- One hundred years of Singapore. Walter Makepeace, Gilbert E. Brooke, Roland St. John Braddell. Singapore: Oxford University Press. 1991. ISBN 0-19-588572-4. OCLC 26363276.
- Samuel, D. S. (1939). Malayan Street Names: What they Mean and Whom they Commemorate. Ipoh: Mercantile Press. p. 86.

Legal offices
New title	Attorney-General of Singapore; 1867–1883	Succeeded by John Augustus Harwood
Government offices
Preceded by James W. W. Birch	Acting Colonial Secretary of Straits Settlements; 1874–1875	Succeeded by William Willans (Acting)
