= Grafton Underwood =

Village in Northamptonshire, England

Coordinates: 52.4147°N 0.6414°W

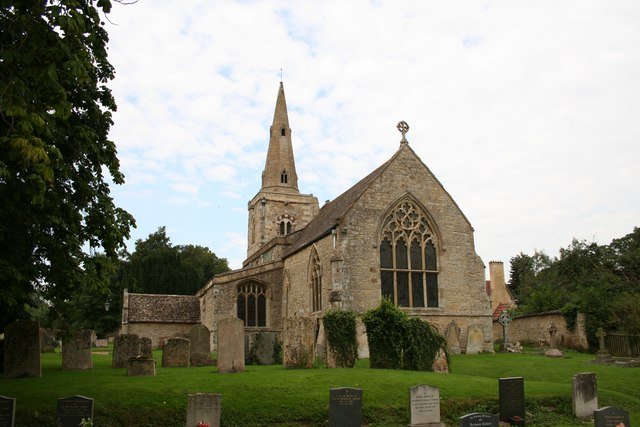
- St James the Apostle Church

- Location within Northamptonshire
- Population: 146 (2011)
- OS grid reference: SP9280
- Unitary authority: North Northamptonshire
- Ceremonial county: Northamptonshire
- Region: East Midlands
- Country: England
- Sovereign state: United Kingdom
- Post town: Kettering
- Postcode district: NN14
- Dialling code: 01536
- Police: Northamptonshire
- Fire: Northamptonshire
- Ambulance: East Midlands
- UK Parliament: Kettering

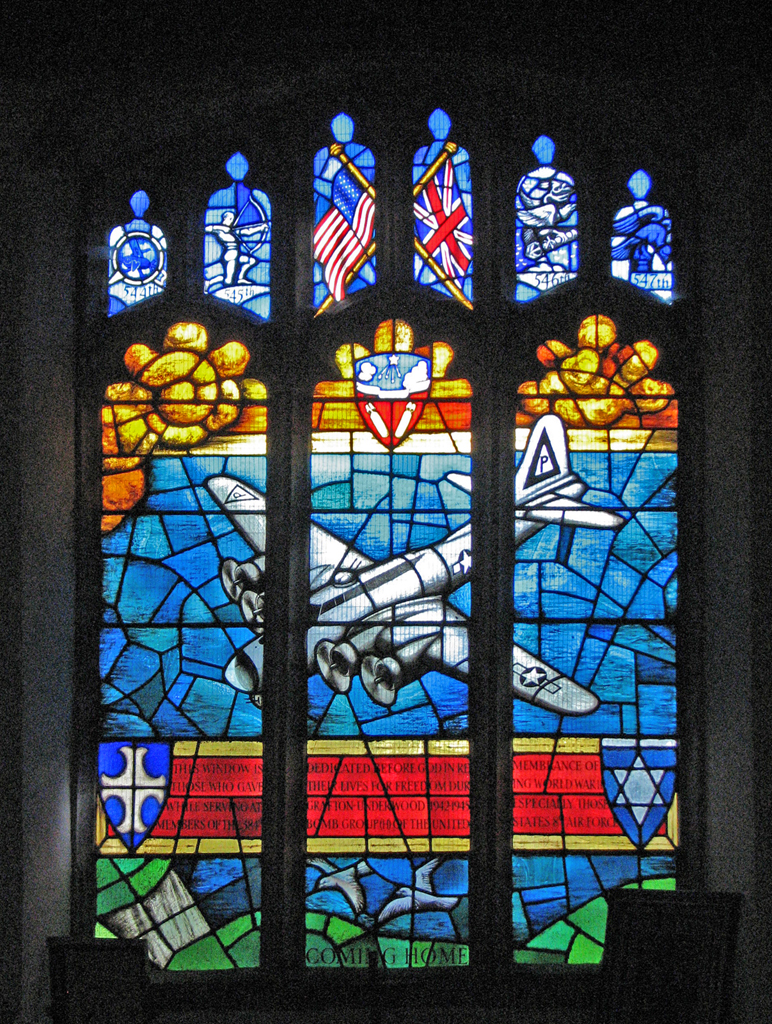
USAAF memorial window (1977) by Brian Thomas in the parish church

Grafton Underwood is a village and civil parish in North Northamptonshire, England. At the time of the 2001 census, the parish's population was 134 people, increasing to 146 at the 2011 census. The village was used in Helen Fielding's Bridget Jones novels as her childhood home.

The villages name means 'Grove farm/settlement'. The affix refers to Rockingham Forest.

The Church of England parish church is dedicated to St James the Apostle. It is a Grade I listed building.

RAF Grafton Underwood was assigned to the United States Army Air Forces Eighth Air Force in 1942 as USAAF Station 106.

The village was the location of the second meeting of the early Victorian era tennis event called the North Northamptonshire LTC Tournament in June 1881.
