= Michael Gallwey McNamara =

Irish tennis player

Michael McNamara
- Full name: Michael Gallwey McNamara
- Country (sports): Ireland
- Born: 30 November 1859 County Cork, Ireland
- Died: 25 February 1938 (aged 78) Grand Hotel, Monaco
- Turned pro: 1880 (amateur tour)
- Retired: 1920

Singles
- Career record: 24/20 (54.45%)
- Career titles: 4

Grand Slam singles results
- Wimbledon: QF (1885)

Doubles

Grand Slam doubles results
- Wimbledon: QF (1885)

Michael Gallwey McNamara (30 November 1859 – 25 February 1938) was an Irish tennis player in the later half of the 19th century and early 20th century. He was a semi finalist at the 1880 Irish Lawn Tennis Championships in Dublin, Ireland and a quarter finalist in the singles and doubles events at the 1885 Wimbledon Championships. He was active from 1880 to 1920 and won 4 career titles.

== Career ==
McNamara played his first tournament at the 1880 Irish Championships where he reached the semi-finals before losing to English man William Renshaw in three straight sets. The same year, he entered to play his first Wimbledon tournament but was defeated in the second round by William Henry Darby D'Esterre, 3 sets to 1. In May 1881, he played the Irish Championships for the second time but exited early in the first round, losing to a top ranked player from England, Richard Richardson, in 3 straight sets. He returned to Ireland, and in August 1881 took part in the Waterford Annual Lawn Tennis Tournament and won his first title, beating fellow Irish man James Joycelyn Glascott 2 sets to 0.

In September, he returned to England. He took part in the Cheltenham Championships held at Cheltenham, where he reached the semi-finals before losing to Robert Braddell 3 sets to love. In October 1881, losing, he travelled to Brighton, Sussex to play in the Sussex County Lawn Tennis Tournament (autumn edition). It was staged on the outside asphalt courts of the Brighton and Hove rink. He claimed his second title, beating Charles Walder Grinstead 3 sets to 0 in the semi-finals, and then Champion Branfill Russell 3 sets to 1 in the final.

In June 1882, he competed at the Agricultural Hall Tournament held at the Royal Agricultural Hall, Islington, Middlesex on wood courts indoors, where he reached the semi-finals before losing to Edward Lake Williams 5–7, 6–4, 10–8. He next played at a major event at the Princes Club Championships at Hans Place, but was easily beaten by Herbert Lawford in the first round. In August, he was back in Ireland, where he played and won his second Waterford Annual Lawn Tennis Tournament in the final in two straight sets. In September, he returned to Brighton, England, to defend his title at the Sussex County Lawn Tennis Tournament, but he was defeated in five sets by England's Herbert Wilberforce, 6–1, 6–8, 0–6, 6–2, 6–2.

Following a break from tennis, he next played at the Middlesex Championships in 1885, losing in the second round to Herbert Chipp. He then competed in the 1885 Wimbledon Championships, where he defeated Ernest Meers in round two and advanced to the quarter-finals before losing to compatriot Ernest Browne, 6–1, 7–5, 6–2. At the same tournament he also reached the men's doubles quarter final partnering R.M. Wile where they lost to Claude Farrer and Arthur J. Stanley. In 1886, he chose to play Wimbledon again, and came up against Ernest Renshaw in the second round, losing 3 sets to 1. He competed at Wimbledon for another two years but did not proceed beyond the first round. His fourth and final career title came some years later at the 1891 Rushbrooke tournament in County Cork, Ireland, where he defeated compatriot William Perrott 3 sets to 1 in the final. He played his finals singles event at the Cannes Beau Site New Year Meeting in 1920 where he lost to Pierre Albarran.
