= Armagh Championship =

Defunct tennis tournament
- Founded: 1878; 147 years ago
- Abolished: 1934; 91 years ago
- Location: Armagh, Northern Ireland
- Venue: Archery and Lawn Tennis Club
- Surface: Hard

The Armagh Championship or Armagh ALTC Championship was a combined men's and women's Hard court tennis tournament staged first staged on 28 September 1878 as the Armagh Lawn Tennis Tournament at the Archery and Lawn Tennis Club, Armagh, Northern Ireland. The championship was staged up to at least 1934.

== History ==
The Armagh Lawn Tennis Tournament was a late Victorian period tennis tournament that was played on hard courts (one of the earliest known). The tournament was organised by the Archery and Lawn Tennis Club in Armagh, Northern Ireland. This tournament was particularly unique, not for it just being a hard court event, it also staged combined events for men and women in both singles, doubles and mixed doubles. However they were not all held at the same time the events were spread out over a three-month period, being played July through to October.

At the inaugural 1878 tournament only a men's singles event was played, that was won by Walter Francis Templer, the brother of Robert Baron Templer. On 27 July 1882, the Armagh LTC Tournament was concluded that featured a women's singles, doubles and mixed soubles event. The women's singles was won by Miss J M McLintock. The women's doubles event was won by Miss. G McLintock and Miss J M Mclintock, and the mixed double's was won by Major Dashwood and Miss J M Mclintock. In October 1882 a second Armagh LTC Tournament was held for the men's singles event that was held won by Robert Barron Templer.

The tournament continued to staged throughout the 1880s and 1890s. The tournament continued to be held throughout the 1920s, and into the early 1930s which by this point it was known as the Armagh Championship Tournament.

== Finals ==
=== Men's singles ===
(incomplete roll)

| Year | Champion | Runner up | Score |
|---|---|---|---|
| 1878 | (Ireland) Walter Francis Templer | (Ireland) Robert Baron Templer | 6–5, 5–6, 6–2 |
| 1879 | (England) Frederick Lorance Cope (2) | (Ireland) Robert Shaw Templer | 6-5 |
| 1880 | (Ireland) F.A. Clark (3) | (Ireland) Robert Shaw Templer | 2–0 sets |
| 1881 | (Ireland) Robert Baron Templer (2) | (Ireland) Robert Shaw Templer | 2–0 sets |
| 1882 | (Ireland) Robert Baron Templer (3) | (Ireland) Robert Baron Templer | 3–1 sets |
| 1883 | (Ireland) Robert Baron Templer (4) | (Ireland) E.J. Wolfe | 2–1 sets |
| 1885 | (Ireland) Robert Baron Templer (5) | (Ireland) Walter Francis Templer | w.o. |
| 1886 | (Ireland) Walter Francis Templer (2) | (Ireland) A. Wolfe | 2–1 sets |
| 1887 | (Ireland) Hagan Wilfred Jones | (Ireland) T. Dickson | 2–0 sets |
| 1888 | (Ireland) Arthur David Ash Gaussen | (Ireland) J. Gordon | 2–1 sets |
| 1934 | (Republic of Ireland) D'Arcy McCrea | (Republic of Ireland) George McVeagh | 6–4, 4–6, 6–4 |

=== Men's doubles ===
(incomplete roll)

| Year | Champion | Runner up | Score |
|---|---|---|---|
| 1887 | (England) Charles Langham Carter (Ireland) Hagan Wilfred Jones | (Ireland) Harold Hardyman (Ireland) Thomas Kelly Murphy | 2–0 sets |

=== Women's singles ===
(incomplete roll)

| Year | Champion | Runner up | Score |
|---|---|---|---|
| 1887 | (Ireland) Doireann Boyle | (England) Lavinia Chambers | 6–3, 6–2 |
| 1888 | (Ireland) Lena Rice | (Ireland) May Langrishe | 2–1 sets |
| 1932 | (Republic of Ireland) Hilda Wallis | (Republic of Ireland) Norma Stoker | 6-1, 6–4 |
| 1934 | (United Kingdom) Irene Maltby | (Republic of Ireland) Hilda Wallis | 6–4, 2–6, 6–3 |

=== Women's doubles ===
(incomplete roll)

| Year | Champion | Runner up | Score |
|---|---|---|---|
| 1891 | (Ireland) Miss. Johnston (Ireland) Miss. McClintock | (Ireland) Miss.Marks (Ireland) Miss. Geer | 6–1, 4–6, 6–4 |

=== Mixed doubles ===
(incomplete roll)

| Year | Champion | Runner up | Score |
|---|---|---|---|
| 1887 | (Ireland) Rorry Maunsell (England) Lavinia Chambers | (Ireland) Harold Hardyman (Ireland) Doireann Boyle | 2–0 sets |

== Sources ==
- Belfast News Letter (25 June 1934). Belfast, Antrim, Northern Ireland: British Newspaper Archives.
- Dublin Daily Express. (5 September 1888). Dublin, Republic of Ireland: British Newspaper Archives.
- Irish Times.(10 July 1891). Dublin, Ireland: British Newspaper Archives.
- Northern Whig and Belfast Post (14 June 1923). British Newspaper Archives.
- Routledge Sporting Annual (1883) Results for 1882. George Routledge and Son's. London. England.
