= North Northamptonshire LTC Tournament =

Defunct tennis tournament
- Founded: 1880
- Abolished: 1883
- Editions: 4
- Location: Grafton Underwood, North Northamptonshire, England; Lowick, Kettering, North Northamptonshire, England
- Venue: North Northamptonshire Lawn Tennis Club
- Surface: Grass

The North Northamptonshire LTC Tournament . also known simply as the North Northamptonshire LTC was a brief Victorian era men's and women's grass court tennis tournament founded in 1880. It was organised by the North Northamptonshire Lawn Tennis Club who held the event at different locations in North Northamptonshire, England. The tournament ran annually for four editions only until 1883.

== History ==
North Northamptonshire LTC Tournament was founded in 1880 by the North Northamptonshire Lawn Tennis Club who held the event at different locations in North Northamptonshire, England through until 1883. The inaugural event was held on 20 July 1880 at Drayton Park at Drayton House on the Drayton Estate, Lowick, near Kettering, but could not be completed until August 1880, and at Broughton Park, Broughton, Northamptonshire. The winner of the gentleman's singles was Mr. W.H. Collins.

A description of the event that concluded on 23 June 1881:

On the 23rd at Grafton Underwood, the North Northamptonshire LTC held their second meeting, in spledid weather. Results: Gentleman's G. R. Evans and G. Thurston beat H. M. Stockdale and T. Wetherall. Ladies; Miss. A. Stobart and Miss. E. Hunt beat Miss. E. Hall and Miss. F. Lightfoot. Ladie's and Gentleman's, Mrs. Upcher and A. Pulteney beat Miss. Bell and H. Stockdale.

— Lawn Tennis, Routledge's Sporting Annual (1882). p. 69.

North Northamptonshire Lawn Tennis Club usually held two versions of this tournament one in the spring around April and the other early summer in June, they are referred to as the first and second meetings. The final edition concluded on 18 August 1883 at Drayton Park, Kettering the winner of last gentleman's singles was Mr. H.S. Roughton.

== Spring (First Meeting) ==
=== Men's Singles ===
Year	Winner	Runner-up	Score
1880.	(England) W. H. Collins	(United Kingdom) G. H. Evans	?
1881.	(England) G. H. Evans	(England) ?	?
1882.	(England) R. Dalton *	(United Kingdom) Henry Minshull Stockdale	?

== Summer (Second Meeting) ==
=== Men's Singles ===
Year	Winner	Runner-up	Score
1883.	(England) H.S. Roughton *	(United Kingdom) R. Dalton	6-5, 3–6, 6–4, 4–6, 6-2

=== Men's Doubles ===
Year	Winner	Runner-up	Score
1881.	(England) G. R. Evans (England) G. Thurston	(United Kingdom) H. M. Stockdale (England) H. Stockdale	won

=== Women's Doubles ===
Year	Winner	Runner-up	Score
1881.	(England) Miss. A, Stobart (England) Miss. E. Hunt	(United Kingdom) Miss. Bell (England) Miss. F. Lightfoot	won

=== Mixed Doubles ===
Year	Winner	Runner-up	Score
1881.	(England) Mrs. Upcher (England) A. Pulteney	(United Kingdom) H. M. Stockdale (England) T. Wetherall	won

== Notes ==
Challenge Round: the final round of a tournament, in which the winner of a single-elimination phase faces the previous year's champion, who plays only that one match. The challenge round was used in the early history of tennis (from 1877 through 1921), in some tournaments not all.

* Indicates challenger

== Sources ==
- Routledges Sporting Annual (1882) George Routledge and Son. London.
- The Evening Post (20 March 1922) Dublin, Ireland
