= Penzance Open =

Defunct tennis tournament
- Tour: Men's Amateur Tour (1877–1912); Women's Amateur Tour (1877-1912); ILTF Men's Amateur Tour (1913–1967); ILTF Women's Amateur Tour (1913-1967)
- Founded: 1881, 1950
- Abolished: 1887, 1978
- Location: Penzance, Cornwall, England.
- Venue: Penzance Lawn Tennis Club
- Surface: Grass

The Penzance Open tournament was originally called the Penzance LTC Tournament as a combined grass court tennis tournament staged at by the Penzance LTC,Penzance, Cornwall, England in 1881, that ran until 1887.

In 1950 the Penzance Open was established as a senior international tour level event that ran until 1978. The Penzance Open is still being staged today as a local tournament.

== History ==
On 15 August 1881 the Penzance LTC Tournament was held for the first time at Penzance, Cornwall, England as a tennis event for men only that ended on 16 August. The first edition was won by a Mr. P. H. Fernandez. On 11 August 1882 the second edition of the tournament was concluded, the men's singles event was won by Arthur Stanhope Rashleigh, and the women's singles was won by a Miss M. Jackson.

The first Penzance LTC Tournament was staged up to 1887, when both the club and event ended the with men's event being won by the American player A. K. Andrews. In the summer of 1950 saw the first Penzance Open Tournament was staged by the new Penzance Lawn Tennis Club at Penlee Park, Penzance, Cornwall. Former winners of the men's singles title include; the Polish player Ernest Whittmann (1953–1954), Roger Taylor (1959), The women's singles title has been won by Joan Curry (1955), Billie Woodgate (1957–1958), a Wimbledon quarter finalist in the women's doubles, and mixed doubles events.

== Venue ==
In 1947 a new Penzance Lawn Tennis Club was established at the promenade, Penzance and consisted of two hard courts. In 1950 Penzance LTC moved to a permanent location at Penlee Park. The club then consisted of four ‘En Tout Cas’ shale courts, plus two existing grass courts. Today the club has four floodlit artificial grass courts and three floodlit macadam hard courts.

== Sources ==
- Penzance 71st Open Tournament 2021". tennis-cornwall.co.uk. Tennis Cornwall.
- Penzance Tennis Club. "Our History". penzancetennisclub.co.uk.
- Player Profile: Ernest Wittmann". ATP Tour. ATP.
- Player Profile: Billie Woodgate". www.wimbledon.com. LTA.
- Routledges Sporting Annual. (1882). Lawn Tennis in 1881. George Routledge and Sons.
- Routledge's Sporting Annual. (1883). London: George Routledge and Sons.
