= Abbot's Court Hoo Tournament =

Defunct tennis tournament
- Founded: 1881; 144 years ago
- Abolished: 1884; 141 years ago
- Location: Hoo St Werburgh, Rochester, Kent, England
- Venue: Abbot's Court
- Surface: Grass

The Abbot's Court Hoo Tournament was a men's grass court tennis tournament first held in August 1881 at Abbot's Court, Hoo St Werburgh, Rochester, Kent, England. The event ran for four editions only till 1884.

== History ==
The Abbot's Court Hoo Tournament was a late 19th century grass court tennis tournament held only two times from 1881 to 1882 at Abbot's Court, Hoo St Werburgh, Rochester, Kent, England. The first winner of the men's singles was Britain's Edward Mansel. The final winner of the men's singles was Ernest Wool Lewis.

== Finals ==
=== Men's Singles ===
Year	Winner	Runner-up	Score
1881	(United Kingdom) Edward Mansel	(England) Warwick Stunt	6-3, 6–2, 6-2
1882	(United Kingdom) Charles Haynes	(England) Mr. Stuart	3-6, 6–4, 6–3.
1884	(United Kingdom) Ernest Wool Lewis	(United Kingdom) Roy Allen	6-4, 6–4, 6-4

=== Mixed Doubles ===
Year	Winner	Runner-up	Score
1882	(United Kingdom) Charles Haynes (United Kingdom) Miss Helen Winckworth	(England) Charles Lake (United Kingdom) Miss Sarah Rosher	2-6, 6–3, 6-4
