= Sussex County Lawn Tennis Tournament =

Early men's tennis tournament held from 1880 to 1885

Defunct tennis tournament
- Founded: 1880
- Abolished: 1885
- Editions: 6 (2 spring, 4 autumn)
- Location: Hove Rink Tennis Courts; Brighton; Sussex; Great Britain
- Surface: outdoor (Grass) outdoor (Asphalt) indoor (Wood)

The Sussex County Lawn Tennis Tournament was an early men's tennis tournament held from 1880 to 1885. It consisted of a spring tournament usually held in April and another held in autumn usually September. It was a forerunner event for the later Sussex Championships formally called the Sussex County Championships that were first staged in 1889 and are still being staged today.

== History ==
The Sussex County Lawn Tennis Tournament was a brief pre-open era autumn tennis tournament originally played on outdoor asphalt courts at Brighton and Hove Rink, England with the exception of the 1884 event that was played on grass courts. In 1882 the organisers staged a spring event in June also played on asphalt courts, but for only two editions. There were just four editions of this event but it did feature two future Wimbledon Men's singles champions, the Renshaw twins. It was a forerunner event for the later Sussex Championships also called Sussex County Championships that were first staged in 1889.

== Spring tournament ==
=== Men's singles ===
Year	Winner	Runner up	Surface	Score
1882	(United Kingdom) Robert Wallace Glen Lee Braddell	(United Kingdom) Donald Charles Stewart	Wood (i)	6–1, 6–8, 0–6, 6–2, 6–2.
1883	(United Kingdom) Charles Walder Grinstead	(United Kingdom) Donald Charles Stewart	Grass	6–3, 6–8, 8–10, 6–4, 6–1.

== Autumn tournament ==
Incomplete list of tournaments included:

=== Men's singles ===
Year	Winner	Runner up	Surface	Score
1880	(United Kingdom) William Renshaw	(United Kingdom) Ernest Renshaw	Asphalt	6-1 6-8 0-6 6-2 6–2.
1881	(Ireland) Michael Gallwey McNamara	(United Kingdom) Champion Russell	Asphalt	2-6 6-2 6-0 6–1.
1882	(United Kingdom) Herbert Wilberforce	(Ireland) Michael Gallwey McNamara	Asphalt	6-1 6-8 0-6 6-2 6–2.
1883	(United Kingdom) Herbert Wilberforce	(United Kingdom) Charles Walder Grinstead	Asphalt	6-3 6-8 8-10 6-4 6–1.
1884	(United Kingdom) Charles Lacy Sweet	(United Kingdom) Charles Walder Grinstead	Grass	0–6, 6–1, 6–3, 6–3
1885	(United Kingdom) Charles Walder Grinstead	(United Kingdom) William Taylor	Asphalt	w.o.

=== Women's singles ===
Year	Winner	Runner up	Surface	Score
1880	(United Kingdom) Ellen Maltby	(United Kingdom) Mary Ann Maltby	Asphalt	6–3, 6–3
1881	(United Kingdom) Edith Coleridge	(United Kingdom) Leila Lodwick	Asphalt	6–5, 6–2
1885	(United Kingdom) Miss Hudson	(United Kingdom) Constance Bryan	Asphalt	6–1, 6–4
