= Crouch End Hill =

Street in north London

Coordinates: 51°34′40.21″N 0°7′28.17″W

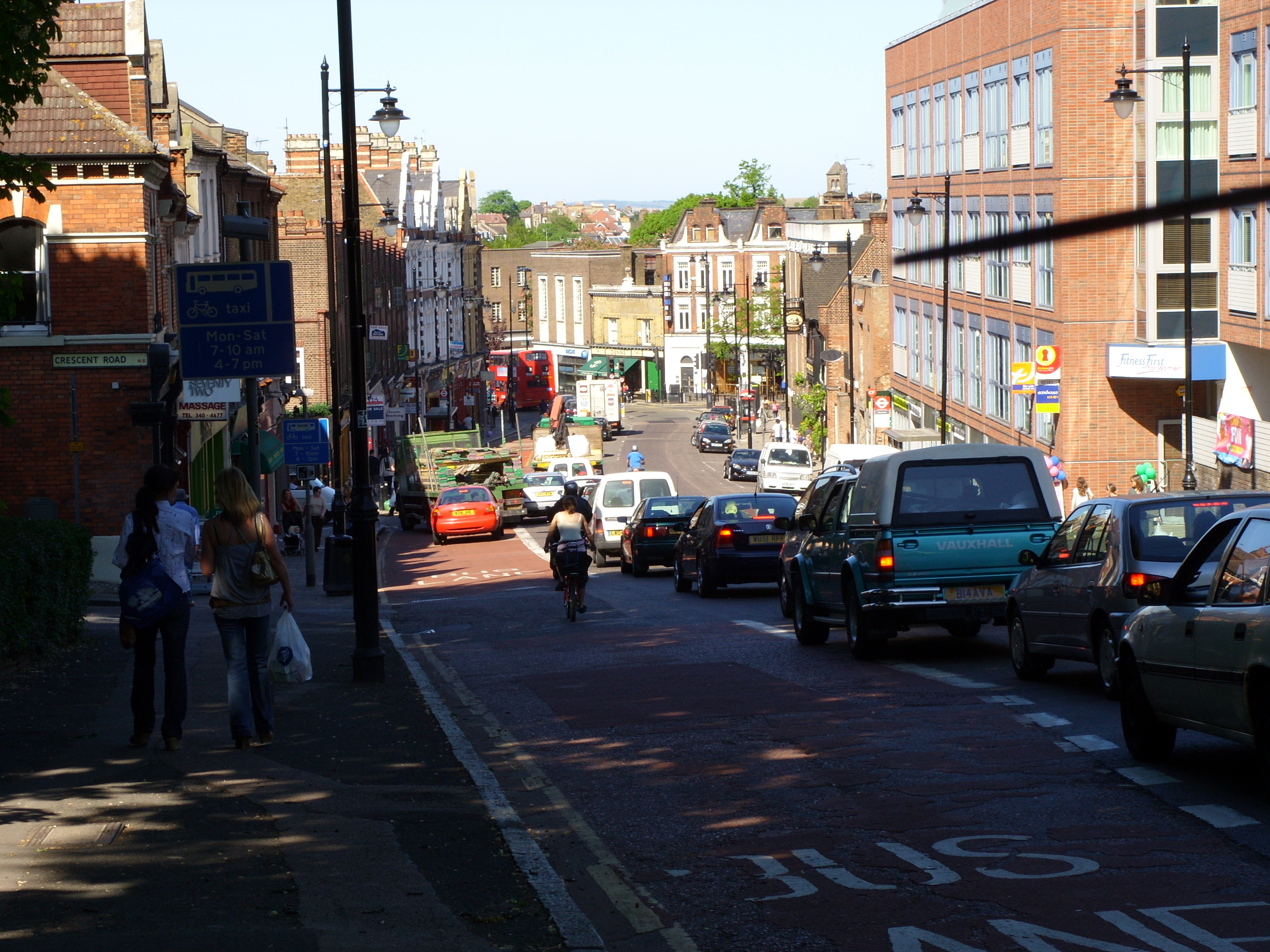
Crouch End Hill

Crouch End Hill is a street in north London, England, running between Crouch End and Hornsey Rise in the boroughs of Haringey and Islington. It is not to be confused with 'Crouch Hill" which runs between Crouch End and Stroud Green. The two roads meet at a "Y" junction in Crouch End and together the two routes constitute the southern access to Crouch End Broadway.

The street proceeds up a steep hill to the top of the ridge which here divides Haringey from Islington. The old name for this ridge along which Hornsey Lane runs and which forms the northern boundary of the Parkland Walk between Crouch End Hill and Crouch Hill is the "Hog's Back".

The street is part of London Buses route 41 and London Buses route 91

== Buildings ==
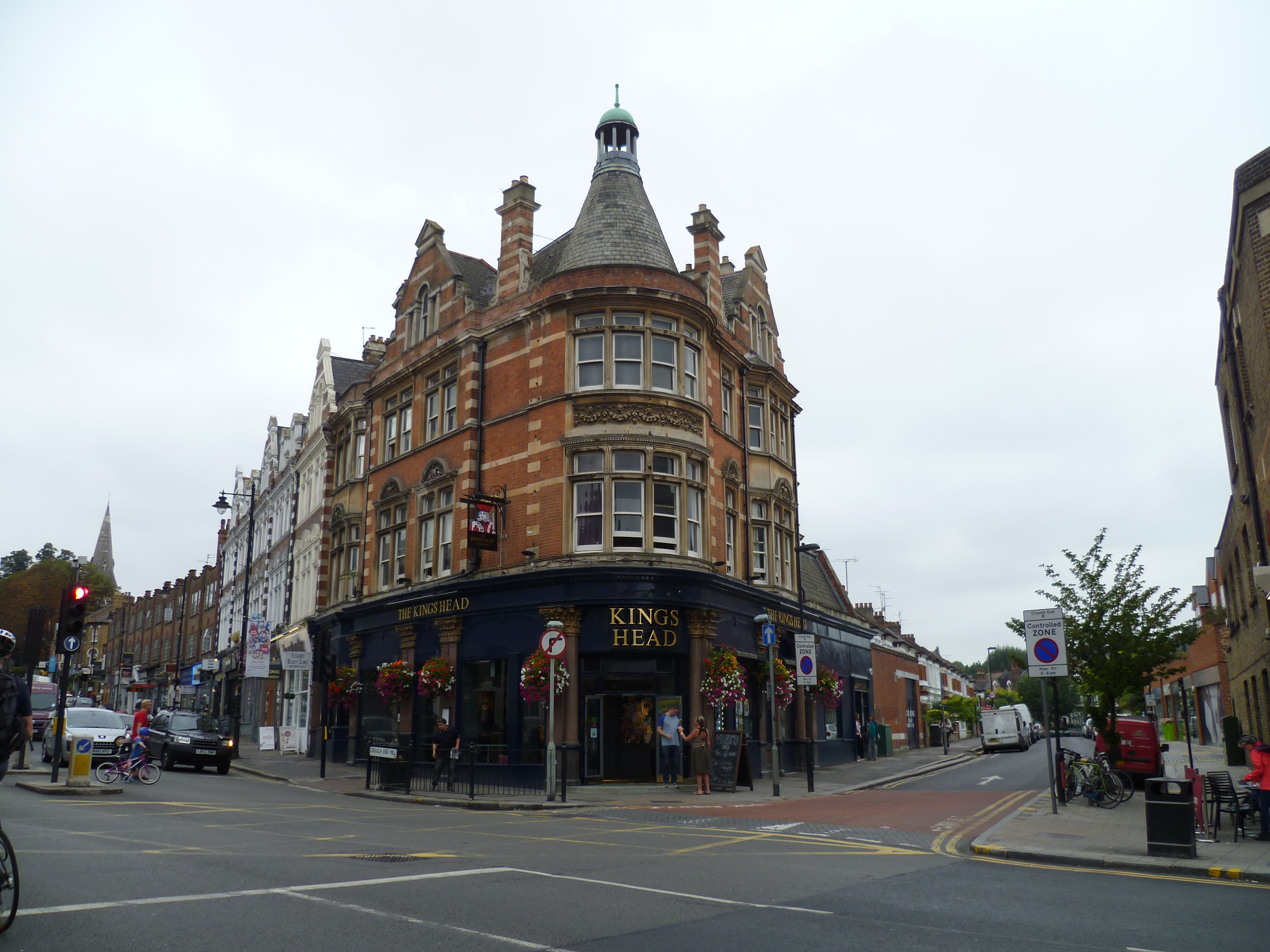
The King's Head pub

On the way up the hill on the right hand side can be found the "Lanacombe Sauna" briefly famous for a court case in 2000 in which the then owner was prosecuted as a brothel keeper. Further up, still on the right hand side as proceeding from Crouch End, can be seen Christchurch. This fine Church of England building was designed by Arthur Blomfield and consecrated by Archibald Tait, Bishop of London, on Friday 27 June 1862. A short distance beyond Christchurch is to be seen the original site of Coleridge Primary School, now called Coleridge West, with facing it across the road the former premises of the Hornsey College of Art now Coleridge East. The two sites are linked across the road by a light controlled pedestrian crossing.

== The Parkland Walk ==
Crouch End Hill then uses a bridge to cross over a public walkway called the Parkland Walk, a public foot and cycle path and linear Park that stretches from Finsbury Park to Alexandra Palace, and follows some of the course of the Northern Heights planned rail extension to the Northern line, abandoned on 9 February 1954. The only remaining buildings relating to Crouch End Station can be seen just before the bridge on the left hand side of the road; one is a building frequently used as an office, the other is a cafe called the "Crescent Cafe" after nearby Crescent Road, and which is clearly marked. There is a zebra crossing at this point. Beside the cafe is an access by stairs to the platforms of Crouch End Station and thence to the Parkland Walk and Crouch Hill Park and to the site occupied by Ashmount Primary School from January 2013. (There is also step free access to the Walk by a ramp from Crescent Road.)

Immediately beyond the bridge there is a T junction with Hornsey Lane joining from the right with Crouch End Hill continuing straight on down the other side of the ridge, now in the London Borough of Islington and now Hornsey Rise.
