= 1882 men's tennis season =

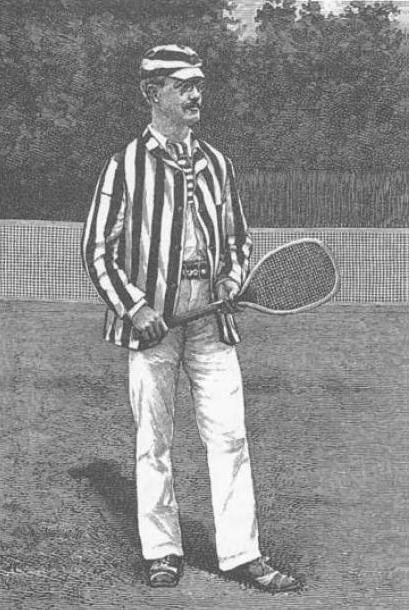
- Richard Sears pictured here won his 2nd consecutive U.S. National Championships this year

Details
- Duration: 24 April – 12 November
- Tournaments: 72 (Amateur)
- Categories: Important (5); National (2); Regional/State (11); County (10); Local (44)

Achievements (singles)
- Most titles: (United Kingdom) Robert W. Braddell (4)
- Most finals: (United Kingdom) Robert W. Braddell (6)

The 1882 men's tennis season incorporated 72 events. The Wimbledon Championships and Irish Championships was won by William Renshaw, the U.S. National Championships was won by Richard Sears collecting his second title. Other big winners were Richard Taswell Richardson picking up the Northern Lawn Tennis Championships and Ernest Renshaw winning the Princes Club Championships, The title leader this season was Robert W. Braddell winning 4 tournaments from 6 finals.

The season started in April in Brighton, England and ended in November in Melbourne, Australia.

== Calendar ==
Notes 1: Challenge Round: the final round of a tournament, in which the winner of a single-elimination phase faces the previous year's champion, who plays only that one match. The challenge round was used in the early history of tennis (from 1877 through 1921), in some tournaments not all.

* Indicates challenger

Notes 2:Tournaments in italics were events that were staged only once that season

=== Key ===
Key

Grand Slam
Important.
National
Provincial/State/Regional
County
Local

=== January to March ===
No events

=== April ===
Date	Tournament	Winner	Finalist	Semifinalist	Quarterfinalist
13-14 April.	Biarritz Lawn Tennis Tournament (later Biarritz Championships); Hotel du Palais Biarritz; Biarritz, France; Clay; Singles - Doubles	(Scotland) Herbert Bowes-Lyon; 0-6 6-3 4-6 6-2 6-3	(England) Mr. W. Smith	(Ireland) Frederick de Moleyns	
21-22 April.	Pau Championships (later Championnat dés Pyrénées); Pau, France; Clay; Singles - Doubles	(England) Percival Wentworth Bewicke; 0-6 6-3 4-6 6-2 6-3	(England) Harold Bradshaw	(Scotland) Patrick Bowes-Lyon (England) Hon. F. De Moleyns	(United Kingdom) Mr P. Russell (France) Monsieur Sainte (United Kingdom) Mr P. Russell.
24 April.	Sussex County Lawn Tennis Club Spring Tournament; Brighton Hove Rink; Brighton, Great Britain; Wood (i); Singles - Doubles	(United Kingdom) Robert W. Braddell; 6-1 6-4 8-6	(United Kingdom) Donald Charles Stewart	(United Kingdom) G. Sandman (United Kingdom) A. W. Skirrow; 6-1 6-3	(United Kingdom)
24 April.	Sussex County Lawn Tennis Club Spring Tournament; Brighton Hove Rink; Brighton, Great Britain; Wood (i); Singles - Doubles	(United Kingdom) Robert W. Braddell (United Kingdom) Donald Charles Stewart; 6-1, 6-2, 6-1	(United Kingdom) Mr. Baker (United Kingdom) Mr. Kellie	(United Kingdom) G. Sandman (United Kingdom) A. W. Skirrow; 6-1 6-3	(United Kingdom)
24 April.	Sussex County Lawn Tennis Club Spring Tournament; Brighton Hove Rink; Brighton, Great Britain; Wood (i); Singles - Doubles	(United Kingdom) Robert W. Braddell (United Kingdom) Miss Edith Coleridge; 6-2, 6-4	(United Kingdom) Arthur Skirrow (United Kingdom) Miss. Florence Kemmis	(United Kingdom) G. Sandman (United Kingdom) A. W. Skirrow; 6-1 6-3	(United Kingdom)
26-27 April.	Bournemouth CLTC Spring Tournament; Bournemouth CLTC; Dean Park Cricket Ground; Bournemouth, England; Grass; Singles - Doubles	(United Kingdom) Hubert James Medlycott; 6-4, 6-4, 3-6, 6-2	(United Kingdom) William Henry Birkbeck	(United Kingdom) Edward George Farquharson (United Kingdom) Lincoln E. Cary Elwes	(United Kingdom) Montague John Druitt (United Kingdom) E.C. Campbell (United Kingdom) Philip F. Cary Elwes (United Kingdom) E. Were

=== May ===
Date	Tournament	Winner	Finalist	Semifinalist	Quarterfinalist
8–13 May.	Gloucestershire Lawn Tennis Tournament; Montpellier Gardens; Cheltenham, Great Britain; Outdoor; Clay; Singles - Doubles	(United Kingdom) Rev. Charles Edward Weldon ?	(United Kingdom) Pelham Von Donop	(United Kingdom) Henry Blane Porter	(United Kingdom) Arthur Walton Fuller (United Kingdom) Dudley David Pontifex
10-22 May.	Longwood Cricket Club Tournament; Longwood Cup; Longwood Cricket Club, Chestnut Hill, Mass, United States; Outdoor; Grass; Singles - Doubles	(United States) Mr. Winslow; 0-6 6-3 4-6 6-2 6-3	(United States) Warren W. Smith	(United States) James Dwight (United States) J. Thomas	(United States) Edward H. Gray (United States) Crawford Allen Nightingale (United States) Mr. Pickman (United States) Frederick Fiske Warren>
22–27 May	Irish Lawn Tennis Championships; Dublin, Ireland; Outdoor; Grass; Singles - Doubles	(United Kingdom) William Renshaw w/o	(Ireland) Peter Aungier; 6-1, 6-3, 8-6	(United Kingdom) Robert Orlando Coote; 6-1 6-4 6-3 (United Kingdom) Ernest Renshaw; Bye	(Ireland) Ernest Browne; 6-5 5-6 6-3 6-5 (United Kingdom) Robert Orlando Coote; Bye (United Kingdom) J. W. Wilson; 6-1 6-1 retired
22–27 May	Irish Lawn Tennis Championships; Dublin, Ireland; Outdoor; Grass; Singles - Doubles	Challenger (United Kingdom) Ernest Renshaw		(United Kingdom) Robert Orlando Coote; 6-1 6-4 6-3 (United Kingdom) Ernest Renshaw; Bye	(Ireland) Ernest Browne; 6-5 5-6 6-3 6-5 (United Kingdom) Robert Orlando Coote; Bye (United Kingdom) J. W. Wilson; 6-1 6-1 retired
29 May-4 June	West of England Championships; Bath, Great Britain; Outdoor; Grass; Singles - Doubles	(United Kingdom) George M. Butterworth; 6-4 6-4	(United Kingdom) A. Kaye Butterworth	(United Kingdom) Pelham Von Donop; 6-3 6-2	(United Kingdom) Robert W. Braddell (United Kingdom) Humphrey H. Berkeley (United Kingdom) Donald Stewart

=== June ===
Date	Tournament	Winner	Finalist	Semifinalist	Quarter finalist
June.	Oxford University Champion Tournament; Norham Gardens, Oxford, Great Britain; Grass; Singles – Doubles	(United Kingdom) Edward Beaumont Cotton Curtis; 3-6, 6-4, 6-0, 3-6, 7-5.	(Scotland) John Galbraith Horn	(England) Arthur Stanhope Rashleigh	(England) Arthur John Chitty (England) Thomas Robinson Grey (England) William Meaburn Tatham
June.	San Gabriel Tournament; San Gabriel, Florida, United States; Outdoor; Hard	(United States) Arthur Allen; 4-6 6-3 6-4 7-5	(United States) Richard Stevens		
June. (Note: The New Jersey State Championships also known as the New Jersey Sectional Championships ran from 1882 to 1973.)	New Jersey State Championships; New Jersey Tennis Association; Newark, New Jersey, United States; Singles - Doubles	(United States) Joseph Sill Clark Sr. ?	(United States) ?		
June. (Note: The Cambridge University tournament ran from 1881 to 1903 and featured winners such as Herbert Wilberforce and Anthony (Tony) Wilding.)	Cambridge University Tournament; Cambridge University LTC; Cambridge, England; Outdoor; Grass; Singles - Doubles	? ?	? ?		
5–10 June.	Worcester Park Challenge Cup; Worcester, England outdoor Grass	(United Kingdom) F. Durant; 6-0, 8-6, 9-7	(United Kingdom) A. Pollock		
6–10 June	St. George's Cricket Club Tournament; Hoboken, United States; Outdoor; Grass; Singles	(United States) Alexander Van Rensselaer; 6-0 5-6 6-1 6-5	(United Kingdom) S. Williams	(United States) James Rankine (United States) Alexander Van Rensselaer	(United States) James Rankine (United States) Walter M. Wood (United States) W.P. Anderson
10–17 June	Northern Championships; Manchester, Great Britain; Outdoor; Grass; Singles - Doubles	(British Empire) Richard Taswell Richardson; 6-1 3-6 5-7 6-4 11-9	(United Kingdom) Robert W. Braddell	(Ireland) Ernest de Sylly H.Browne	(Ireland) Peter Aungier; Ernest de Sylly H.Browne (United Kingdom) R. H. Jones
10–17 June	Northern Championships; Manchester, Great Britain; Outdoor; Grass; Singles - Doubles	Challenger (England) Ernest Renshaw		(Ireland) Ernest de Sylly H.Browne	(Ireland) Peter Aungier; Ernest de Sylly H.Browne (United Kingdom) R. H. Jones
12–18 June	London Athletic Club Tournament London Athletic Club, Fulham, London, Great Britain; Outdoor; Grass; Singles	(England) Herbert Lawford; 6-1 4-6 6-2 6-3	(United Kingdom) Otway Woodhouse	(United Kingdom) Edgar Lubbock (United Kingdom) G. H. Taylor	(United Kingdom) Ernest Wool Lewis (United Kingdom) Arthur J. Stanley (United Kingdom) B. James (United Kingdom) A. A. Nepean
19–25 June	Agricultural Hall Tournament; Fulham, London, Great Britain; Indoor; Wood; Singles	(United Kingdom) Edward Lake Williams; 5-7 6-4 10-8	(Ireland) Ernest de Sylly H. Browne	(Ireland) Michael Gallwey McNamara (United Kingdom) H. Nickoletts	(United Kingdom) Robert W. Braddell (Ireland) Peter Aungier (United Kingdom) H. Nickoletts (United Kingdom) Humphrey H. Berkeley
17–24 June	Princes Club Championships; London, Great Britain; Outdoor; Grass; Singles - Doubles	(England) Ernest Renshaw; 6-2 6-0 6-1	(Ireland) Peter Aungier	(England) Edgar Lubbock	(Ireland) Ernest de Sylly Hamilton Browne (United Kingdom) C. E. Farmer
19–23 June	New York and District Championships; New York, United States; Outdoor; Grass; Singles	(United States) Richard Field Conover; 6-1 0-6 6-5	(United States) Frank S. Benson	(United States) Richard Field Conover (United States) Morton S. Paton; 6-4 6-4	(United States) James Rankine (United States) E. W. Harboard (United States) J. A. Miller (United States)
21 - 26 June	Clifton Lawn Tennis Tournament; Clifton, Bristol, Great Britain; Outdoor; Grass; Singles - Doubles	(United Kingdom) Charles Lacy Sweet; 6-3, 6-3	(United Kingdom) Teddy Williams		

=== July ===
Date	Tournament	Winner	All Comers Finalist	Semifinalist	Quarterfinalist
24 June-1 July,	Waterloo Tournament; Waterloo LTC; Liverpool, Lancashire, England; Outdoor; Grass; Singles - Doubles	(United Kingdom) John William Down ?	(United Kingdom) R. H. Jones	(United Kingdom) Gerald Barker ?	(United Kingdom) F. Mawdsley (United Kingdom) F. W. Jones (United Kingdom) Alex Linzee (United Kingdom) H. G. Wright
28 June–1 July.	Rochester Open; Paddock Lawn Tennis Club; Rochester, Kent, England; Grass; Singles	(United Kingdom) A. Buchanan; 6-1 6-4 6-0	(United Kingdom) E. Welchman	(United Kingdom) W.H. St. John Hope	(United Kingdom) W.A. Dartnall (United Kingdom) J. Langhorne (United Kingdom) W.B. Pulling
1 July.	Woodford Parish Championship; Essex Cricket Club Grounds; Woodford Parish, England; Grass; Singles	(United Kingdom) Gerald Buxton; 6-0, 6-2	(United Kingdom); E. Pratt	(United Kingdom) F.C. Barker (United Kingdom) Ernest Robert Stable	(United Kingdom) B. Skelton Jun (United Kingdom) H.E. Kaye (United Kingdom) N.F. Roberts (United Kingdom) Daniel Wiltringham Stable
26 June - 2 July.	North of Ireland Championships; Belfast, Northern Ireland; Outdoor; Grass; Singles - Doubles	(United Kingdom) G. F. Hanson; 2-0 (sets)	(Ireland) F. E. Cumming	(Ireland) F. G. Gordon	(Ireland) C. H. Duffin (Ireland) P. H. Ewing (United Kingdom) B. Montgomery
26 June - 2 July.	North of Ireland Championships; Belfast, Northern Ireland; Outdoor; Grass; Singles - Doubles	Challenger (Ireland) E. J. Charley		(Ireland) F. G. Gordon	(Ireland) C. H. Duffin (Ireland) P. H. Ewing (United Kingdom) B. Montgomery
3 – 8 July.	Western Counties Championship; Glasgow Cricket Ground; Glasgow, Lanarkshire, Scotland; Grass; Singles – Doubles	(Scotland) Edward Mortimer Shand; 2 sets to 0	(Scotland) R.S. McNair	(Scotland) W.L. MacIndoe (Scotland) A. McWilliam	
3 – 8 July.	West of Scotland Championships; Glasgow Cricket Ground; Glasgow, Lanarkshire, Scotland; Grass; Singles – Doubles	(United Kingdom) Walter William Chamberlain; 2 sets to 0	(Scotland) Archibald Thomson	(United Kingdom) A.L. Davidson (United Kingdom) Mr. Grant	(England) William Nevill Cobbold (Scotland) H. Mitchell (Australia) Alexander Barclay Shand (Scotland) Edward Mortimer Shand
7-9 July	Abbot's Court Hoo Tournament; Hoo St Werburgh, Rochester, Kent, England; Outdoor; Grass; Singles	(United Kingdom) Charles Haynes; 3-6, 6–4, 6–3	(England) Mr. Stuart	(United Kingdom) E. Rosher	(United Kingdom) Warwick Stunt (United Kingdom) Mr. Smythies
11 July.	Doncaster & Barnsdale Open; Doncaster & Barnsdale ATC; Doncaster, South Yorkshire, England; Grass; Singles	(United Kingdom) Edward Mahon; 3-6, 6–4, 6–3	(United Kingdom) James Vesey Mahon	(United Kingdom) William Henry Mahon (United Kingdom) W. Ware	(United Kingdom) Rev. C.W. Bean (United Kingdom) Capt. Johnson (United Kingdom) S.E. Somerville (United Kingdom) E.M. Weigall
14 July.	Gore Court Championships; Sittingbourne, Gore Court Archery and LTC; Gore Court, Sittingbourne, Great Britain; Outdoor; Grass; Singles	(United Kingdom) J.R. Daniell; 6-4, 6-3	(United Kingdom) J. Langley	(United Kingdom) A. Hilton	(United Kingdom) Captain Haynes (United Kingdom) C. Harris (United Kingdom) A. Sales
8–17 July	Wimbledon Championships; London, Great Britain; Outdoor; Grass; Singles; Doubles	(England) William Renshaw; 6-1 2-6 4-6 6-2 6-2	(United Kingdom) Richard Taswell Richardson	(Scotland) Herbert Lawford (United Kingdom) Frank S. Benson	(United Kingdom) Frank S. Benson (United Kingdom) Otway Woodhouse (United Kingdom) Herbert Wilberforce (United Kingdom) Humphrey H. Berkeley
8–17 July	Wimbledon Championships; London, Great Britain; Outdoor; Grass; Singles; Doubles	Challenger (England) Ernest Renshaw		(Scotland) Herbert Lawford (United Kingdom) Frank S. Benson	(United Kingdom) Frank S. Benson (United Kingdom) Otway Woodhouse (United Kingdom) Herbert Wilberforce (United Kingdom) Humphrey H. Berkeley
17–20 July	Scottish Championships; Edinburgh, Great Britain; Outdoor; Grass; Singles	(Scotland) John Galbraith Horn6-2 4-6 6-2 6-3	(Scotland) Francis Archibald Fairlie	(Scotland) John Galbraith Horn; Bye (United Kingdom) A L Davidson	(Scotland) William Horn (Scotland) Archibald Thomson (England) Maurice George Lascelles
17–23 July	Northumberland Championships; Newcastle, Great Britain; Outdoor; Grass; Singles - Doubles	(United Kingdom) Mark Fenwick; 2-0 (sets)	(Ireland) Charles J. Eade	(United Kingdom) Percival C. Fenwick; 2-1 (sets) (United Kingdom) Henry K. Armstrong	(Ireland) Charles J. Eade (United Kingdom) R. Blunt (United Kingdom) J. W. Fowler (United Kingdom) F. W. Mansell
21–22 July. (Note: The Staffordshire Tournament was staged from 1879 to 1890.)	Staffordshire County Cricket Club Lawn Tennis Tournament. Lichfield, England; Outdoor; Grass; Singles	(United Kingdom) Frederick Charles Stamer; 6-4 2-6 6-5	(United Kingdom) C.W. Howe	(England) Arthur Belfield; Def	(England) John Redfern Deykin (United Kingdom) Frederick Henry Tullock (United Kingdom) W.L. Ward
24–26 September.	Vale of Clwyd CLTC Open Tournament; Vale of Clwyd LTC; Denbigh, Vale of Clwyd, Wales; Outdoor; Grass; Singles	(England) Arthur Bennett Mesham; 3-6 6-2 6-4	(Wales) H. Lloyd Williams	(United Kingdom) J.P. Lewis	(United Kingdom) Major Mesham (United Kingdom) C.J. Wilkinson
26 July. (Note: The Portland Park Lawn Tennis & Croquet Club, Newcastle upon Tyne ran known tournaments from 1882 to 1894. The national archives UK confirms club was operating until 1972.)	Portland Park LTCC Tournament; Portland Park LTCC; Newcastle upon Tyne, Northumberland, England; Outdoor; Grass; Singles - Doubles	(United Kingdom) E.A. Simpson w.o.	(United Kingdom) Minden Fenwick		
27 July	Richfield Springs Tournament; Richfield Springs, United States; Outdoor; Grass; Singles	(United States) Joseph Sill Clark Sr. ?	(United States) A.C. Denniston		
25–29 July	County Kildare Open Tennis Championship; Naas, Ireland; Outdoor; Grass; Singles - Doubles	(Ireland) Peter Aungier; 6-1 6-4 6-3	(Ireland) John William Young	(England) Champion Branfill Russell (Ireland) John William Young; Bye	(Ireland) Reverend William Edward De Burgh (Ireland) Algernon A. M. Aylmer (Ireland) Gilbert de Laval Willis
24–29 July	Canadian National Championships; Toronto, Canada; Outdoor; Grass; Singles	(Canada) Harry D. Gamble; 6–2, 6–3, 6–2	(Canada) Isidore F. Hellmuth	(Canada) A. Foy (Canada) H. V. Roberts	(Canada) A. C. Gatt (Canada) H. T. Geddes (Canada) Isidore F. Hellmuth (Canada) W. Lefroy
24–30 July	Norwich Open Tournament; Norwich, Great Britain; Outdoor; Grass; Singles - Doubles	(United Kingdom) William Bolding Monement; 5-6 6-3 6-3	(England) Edward Morgan Hansell	(United Kingdom) Francis William Monement (United Kingdom) J.E.T. Whitehead	(England) John David Wallich (United Kingdom) G.E. Preston (United Kingdom) H.C. Marsh

=== August ===
Date	Tournament	Winner	Finalist	Semifinalist	Quarter finalist
July–August.	Berrylands Club Tournament; Berrylands LTC; Surbiton, Surrey, England; Outdoor; Grass; Singles	(United Kingdom) G.A. Bolton ?	(United Kingdom) H.E.E. Walton	(United Kingdom) C. Price	(United Kingdom) G.N. Christie (United Kingdom) H. Kerby (United Kingdom) L.H. Shadbolt
July–August.	Berrylands Club Tournament; Berrylands LTC; Surbiton, Surrey, England; Outdoor; Grass; Singles	(United Kingdom) Mr. McCrae (United Kingdom) Miss Edith Coleridge; 6-1, 6-5	(United Kingdom) Mr. Prentice (United Kingdom) Miss. Keighley	(United Kingdom) C. Price	(United Kingdom) G.N. Christie (United Kingdom) H. Kerby (United Kingdom) L.H. Shadbolt
August	Inverkip Rovers Open; Castle Wemyss, Wemyss Bay, Scotland; Grass; Singles	(Scotland) Horatio Renaud Babington Peile ?			
August. (Note: The Maidstone tournament was staged from 1881 to 1897.)	Maidstone Tournament; Maidstone Athletic Ground; Maidstone, England; Outdoor; Grass; Singles	(United Kingdom) Richard Mercer w.o.	(United Kingdom) Mr. Stisted		
1-2 August.	Holt Lawn Tennis Club Tournament; Holt LTC; Holt, Norfolk, England; Outdoor; Grass; Singles - Doubles	(England) William Bolding Monement; 6-5 6-2	(United Kingdom) Francis William Monement	(United Kingdom) Francis William Monement (England) G. Trollope	(England) Walter Edward Hansell (United Kingdom) Edmund Clark Worlledge
1–5 August.	Cirencester Park Lawn Tennis Tournament; Earl Bathurst Estate; Cirencester Park; Cirencester, Gloucestershire, England; Outdoor; Grass; Singles - Doubles	(United Kingdom) Charles Lacy Sweet ?	(United Kingdom) Francis Robert (Frank) Benson		
1–6 August.	Brackley LTC Tournament; Brackley Lawn Tennis Club; Brackley, West Northamptonshire, England; Outdoor; Grass; Singles - Doubles	(United Kingdom) Francis Regner Brooksbank def.	(United Kingdom) William Blencowe		
1–7 August	South of Ireland Championships; Limerick Cup; Limerick Cricket Club, Limerick, Ireland; Outdoor; Grass; Singles	(Ireland) Edward Montiford Longfield Lysaght; 7-5 6-4 6-0	(Ireland) William H. Gavin	(United Kingdom) Captain Frederick Thomas Verschoyle (United Kingdom) Edmond Bennet Brackenbury	(Ireland) William Dawson (England) Major Henry Holley Goodeve (England) Chaloner Knox walkover (Ireland) R.D. O'Brien
2–5 August	Darlington Open Tournament; Darlington, Great Britain; Outdoor; Grass; Singles	(England) Arthur Wellesley Hallward; 6-1 4-6 6-1 6-3	(United Kingdom) Minden Fenwick	(Ireland) Sir William Henry Mahon (New Zealand) Mark Fenwick	(United Kingdom) Percival Clennell Fenwick (England) Richard Paul Agar Swettenham (United Kingdom) H. Mason
3–7 August	Leamington Open Tournament; Leamington, LTC Leamington Spa, Great Britain; Outdoor; Grass; Singles - Doubles -	(United Kingdom) Robert W. Braddell; 7-5 6-2 6-3	(United Kingdom) Teddy Williams	(United Kingdom) William H. Rawlinson	(England) John Redfern Deykin (England) John Charles Kay (England) Henry Blane Porter
3–7 August	Warwickshire Championships; Jephson's Gardens, Leamington Spa, Great Britain; Outdoor; Grass; Singles - Doubles -	(United Kingdom) John Redfern Deykin; 6-2, 6-2, 6-4	(United Kingdom) James Powell	(United Kingdom) John Charles Kay	(United Kingdom) A.H. Griffiths; J.H. Mitchell (United Kingdom) F. Shapley
4–8 August	Pentre LTC Challenge Cup; Pentre, LTC; Pembroke, Great Britain; Outdoor; Grass; Singles - Doubles -	(Wales) Henry Gwyn Saunders Davies; 7-5 6-3 6-3	(England) Wilfrid Edward Sturges-Jones		
7–12 August	Waterford Annual Lawn Tennis Tournament; Waterford, Cricket Club; Waterford, Ireland; Outdoor; Grass; Singles	(Ireland) Michael Gallwey McNamara; 6-3 6-0	(United Kingdom) Captain Bethune	(United Kingdom) Captain Bethune (Ireland) Frederick William Knox	(Ireland) Algernon Ambrose Michael Aylmer (Ireland) Henry Joseph Gallwey (Ireland) Robert Chaloner Knox
7–12 August	Waterford Annual Lawn Tennis Tournament; Waterford, Cricket Club; Waterford, Ireland; Outdoor; Grass; Singles	Challenge round (United Kingdom) W.G. Wyld		(United Kingdom) Captain Bethune (Ireland) Frederick William Knox	(Ireland) Algernon Ambrose Michael Aylmer (Ireland) Henry Joseph Gallwey (Ireland) Robert Chaloner Knox
9–12 August	Exmouth Lawn Tennis Club Tournament; Exmouth, Great Britain; Outdoor; Grass; Singles	(England) Charles Lacy Sweet; 6-1 6-4	(United Kingdom) Pelham George von Donop	(United Kingdom) Teddy Williams (United Kingdom) W.E. Martyn	(England) Philip Francis Cary Elwes (United Kingdom) S. Hall (England) Conway John Morgan (United Kingdom) J.B. Thomson
11-12 August.	Penzance Open; Penzance LTC; Penzance, Cornwall, England; Outdoor; Grass; Singles - Doubles	(United Kingdom) Arthur Stanhope Rashleigh; 6-0 6-1	(United Kingdom) P.H. Fernandez	(United Kingdom) H. Mann	(United Kingdom) H.D. Foster (United Kingdom) N. Harvey (United Kingdom) William H. Hughes
8–13 August. (Note: The Essex Championships was founded in 1881 at Brentwood and staged until 1981. Six other towns and cities hosted this event throughout its history. Notable winners have included Arthur Gore, Reggie Doherty, Herbert Roper-Barrett and Neale Andrew Fraser.)	Essex Championships; Brentwood, Great Britain; Outdoor; Grass; Singles - Doubles	(England) Charles Walder Grinstead; 6-2 6-3	(United Kingdom) Nalton Womersley	(United Kingdom) P.M. Evans (England) Norman Leslie Hallward	(England) Edward North Buxton (United Kingdom) P.M. Evans; Bye (England) Charles Walder Grinstead
1 – 15 August.	North Berkshire ALTC Tournament; Abingdon, North Berkshire, England; Outdoor; Grass; Singles - Doubles	(United Kingdom) T.E. Graham; 3 sets to 2	(United Kingdom) W.R. Graham	(United Kingdom) W. Abbott (England) J.H. Deazeley	(United Kingdom) Mr. Buckland (United Kingdom) F. Comins (United Kingdom) Mr. Gosset (United Kingdom) Captain Preston
12 - 19 August.	Langley Marish Tournament; Eaton Recreation Ground; Langley Marish, Berkshire, England; Grass	(England) Ernest Henry Montresor; 7-5, 6-4	(England) Rev. W. Gilbert Edwards	(England) Wiliam Harry Nash	(United Kingdom) E.R. Nash | (United Kingdom) R.H. Pickering
21–22 August	Teignmouth and Shaldon Tournament; Teignmouth, Great Britain; Outdoor; Hard; Singles	(England) Humphrey H. Berkeley ?	(United Kingdom) Arthur John Stanley	(England) Humphrey H. Berkeley (United Kingdom) F. Thomas	(United Kingdom) G.B. Hodson (United Kingdom) G.J. Mitton (United Kingdom) E.H. Oldham
22–26 August.	South Wales Championships; Tenby LTC; Tenby, Carmarthenshire, Wales; Outdoor; Grass; Singles	(Wales) Grismond Saunders Davies; 6-4, 6-3, 6-2	(Wales) George Bevan Bowen	(United Kingdom) Herbert Wilberforce (Wales) John Vaughan Brenchley	(Wales) Dai Griffiths (Wales) Arthur M. Phillips Llewellyn (Wales) Thomas Bennion (United Kingdom) Bryn Davies
22–26 August	South of Scotland Championships; Beechgrove Grounds; Moffat, Scotland; Outdoor; Grass; Singles	(England) Arthur Walton Fuller Lysaght ?	(Scotland) Alfred Gordon Rae	(England) Barrington Barnes (Scotland) Alfred Aitken Thomson	(United Kingdom) G.M. Buckham (United Kingdom) W.A. Ramsay (Scotland) Richard Millar Watson
21–27 August	Victoria Park Lawn Tennis Tournament; Exeter, Great Britain; Outdoor; Grass; Singles	(United Kingdom) G.M. Minchin; 6-0 6-3	(United Kingdom) F.A. Clarke	(United Kingdom) F.A. Clarke (United Kingdom) Spencer Cox	(England) Arthur William Buckingham (England) Edward Charles Pine-Coffin (United Kingdom) S. Hull
29 August-4 September. (Note: The East Grinstead Lawn Tennis & Croquet Club was founded in 1882 and staged a notable open tennis tournament until 1938. The club is still operating today.)	East Grinstead Open; East Grinstead LTCC; East Grinstead, England; Outdoor; Grass; Singles	(England) William Nevill Cobbold; 6-0 6-3	(England) Percy Evershed Wallis	(England) William Nevill Cobbold (United Kingdom) Maurice William Casterton Smelt	(United Kingdom) Harold Denison Arbuthnot (United Kingdom) A. Mainwaring (England) Percy Evershed Wallis
31 August	Gore Court Championships; Sittingbourne Archery and LTC; Sittingbourne, Kent, England; Indoor; Wood; Singles	(United Kingdom) J.R. Daniell; 6-4, 6-4,6-4	(United Kingdom) J. Langley	(United Kingdom) A. Hilton	(United Kingdom) C. Harris (United Kingdom) Captain Haynes (United Kingdom) A. Sales

=== September ===
Date	Tournament	Winner	Finalist	Semifinalist	Quarterfinalist
September	Bournemouth CLTC Autumn Tournament (later Hampshire Championships); Bournemouth, Great Britain; Outdoor; Grass; Singles - Doubles	(United Kingdom) Montague Hankey ?	?		
1-2 Sep.	Lowestoft Open Lawn Tennis Tournmament; Lowestoft, Great Britain; Outdoor; Grass; Singles	(England) Walter Edward Hansell; 6-0 6-2	(England) C. Deans	(England) William Bolding Monement	(England) J.T. Horley (England) A.J. Last (United Kingdom) A.H. Williams
28 August-3 September	South of England Championships; Devonshire Park Lawn Tennis Club, Eastbourne, Great Britain; Outdoor; Grass; Singles - Doubles	(United Kingdom) William C. Taylor; 8-6 6-2 3-6 6-3	(United Kingdom) Edward Lake Williams	(England) Ernest Renshaw (United Kingdom) William C. Taylor	(England) Donald Charles Stewart (England) F. Durant (England) Frederick Brunning Maddison
31 August - 3 September	U.S. National Championships Newport Casino, Newport, Rhode Island, United States; Outdoor; Grass; Singles; Doubles	(United States) Richard Sears; 6-1 6-4 6-0	(United States) Clarence Clark	(United States) Richard Sears (United States) Edward H Gray	(United States) James Rankine (United States) James Dwight (United States) Edward H Gray ?
31 August - 3 September	U.S. National Championships Newport Casino, Newport, Rhode Island, United States; Outdoor; Grass; Singles; Doubles	(United States) R Sears (United States) J Dwight; 6-2 6-2 6-4	(United States) GM Smith (United States) C Nightingale	(United States) Richard Sears (United States) Edward H Gray	(United States) James Rankine (United States) James Dwight (United States) Edward H Gray ?
29 August-4 September.	East Grinstead Open; East Grinstead LTCC; East Grinstead, England; Outdoor; Grass; Singles	(England) William Nevill Cobbold; 6-0 6-3	(England) Percy Evershed Wallis	(United Kingdom) Maurice William Casterton Smelt	(United Kingdom) Harold Denison Arbuthnot (United Kingdom) A. Mainwaring
29 August-4 September	Oxford and Cambridge Challenge Cup; Oxford, England; Outdoor; Grass; Singles	(United Kingdom) Robert Braddell; 6-2 6-2	(England) Hubert Hope Wilkes	(United Kingdom) G. Batten (United Kingdom) Pelham George von Donop	(United Kingdom) G. Batten (United Kingdom) A.Belfield (United Kingdom) A.W. Buckingham (United Kingdom) H. B. Kindersey
4–10 September. (Note: The Edgbaston Tennis Tournament were staged from 1881 through 1970 on grass courts.)	Edgbaston Open Tournament; Edgbaston, Great Britain; Outdoor; Grass; Singles	(United Kingdom) G.R. Brewerton; 6-8 6-4 6-0 6-2	(United Kingdom) John Redefern Deykin	(United Kingdom) Arthur Sandiford Openshaw (United Kingdom) Arthur John Stanley	(United Kingdom) G.H. Cartland (United Kingdom) Arthur Walton Fuller (United Kingdom) J. H. Mitchell (United Kingdom) William H. Rawlinson
11–13 September	Montclair Open; Montclair, NJ, United States; Outdoor; Grass; Singles	(United States) Clarence Hobart; 4-6 6-3 6-4 7-5	(United States) Rodmond Vernon Beach	(United States) A.W. Post (United States) J.W. Raymond	(United States) Mr. W.A. Brown (United States) F.A. Kellogg (United States) W.A. Tomes (United States) A.B. Gladwyn
13–15 September	Downshire Lawn Tennis Tournament; Downshire Archery and Lawn Tennis Club; Cliftonville Cricket Club Ground, Belfast, Great Britain; Outdoor; Grass	(United Kingdom) R.J. McNeill; 5-0 5-2	(United Kingdom) P.S. Young	(United Kingdom) Colonel Lloyd	(England) Charles Purdon Coote (United Kingdom) Capt. Spring
11–16 September	Brighton Lawn Tennis Club Tournament; Brighton LTC, Brighton, Great Britain; Outdoor; Grass; Singles	(United Kingdom) A.A. Fuller; 6-4 6-2	(United Kingdom) C.G. Newton	(United Kingdom) C.S. Clarke (United Kingdom) G.H. Thompson	(United Kingdom) W.P. Boyer (England) Leonard Dampier (United Kingdom) D. George (United Kingdom) H.M. Herbert
15–18 September	Orange Autumn Open; Montrose, NJ, United States; Outdoor; Grass; Singles	(Ireland) Robert Barron Templer; 2-0 (sets)	(United Kingdom) H. Irwin; 2-1	(United Kingdom) M. Blacker (Ireland) E. J. Wolfe	(United Kingdom) M. Blacker (United Kingdom) A. Burke (United Kingdom) C. S. Poole (Ireland) V. De. Tattersall
18–23 September	East Gloucestershire Championships; Cheltenham, Great Britain; Outdoor; Grass; Singles	(United Kingdom) William Renshaw; 6–0, 6–1, 6–1	(United Kingdom) Robert W. Braddell	(Ireland) Ernest Browne (Ireland) Michael Gallwey McNamara	(United Kingdom) Henry Blane Porter; 6-1 6-0 6-2 (United Kingdom) Ernest Renshaw
23–30 September	Sussex County Lawn Tennis Tournament; Brighton, Great Britain; Outdoor; Grass; Singles - Doubles	Ireland Michael Gallwey McNamara; 2-6 6-2 6-0 6-1	(United Kingdom) Branfill Champion Russell	(United Kingdom) Charles John Cole; W/O (United Kingdom) Charles Walder Grinstead	(United Kingdom) Humphery H. Berkley (United Kingdom) H. Brooker (United Kingdom) George S. Murray Hill (United Kingdom) H. M. Nichol

=== October ===
Date	Tournament	Winner	Finalist	Semifinalist	Quarterfinalist
10–20 October	Armagh Lawn Tennis Tournament; Armagh, Northern Ireland; Outdoor; Hard; Singles - Doubles	(Ireland) Robert Shaw Templer; 3-1 (sets)	(Ireland) E. J. Wolfe	(Ireland) Arthur Edward Desborough Burke (United Kingdom) W.G. Robinson	
10–20 October	Armagh Lawn Tennis Tournament; Armagh, Northern Ireland; Outdoor; Hard; Singles - Doubles	Challenger (Ireland) Robert Baron Templer		(Ireland) Arthur Edward Desborough Burke (United Kingdom) W.G. Robinson	

=== November ===
Date	Tournament	Winner	Finalist	Semifinalist	Quarterfinalist
4–13 November	Victorian Championships (Australia) Melbourne, Australia; Outdoor; Hard; Singles - Doubles	(Australia) L. Keyser; 6-4 4-6 6-1 6-1	(Australia) Louis Whyte	(Australia) J. S. Conran (Australia) Francis James Highett	(Australia) R. H. James (Australia) W. M. Mitchell (Australia) Francis James Highett

=== December ===
No events

== Tournament winners ==
Note: important tournaments in bold

- (United Kingdom) Robert W. Braddell—Brighton, Oxford, Lemington Spa, Derby—(4)
- (United Kingdom) William Renshaw -Cheltenham, **Irish Championships**, **Wimbledon**—(3)
- (Ireland) Michael Gallwey McNamara—Brighton, Waterford—(2)
- (United Kingdom) Charles Lacy Sweet—Cirecester, Exmouth—(2)
- (United Kingdom) Ernest Renshaw—**Princes Club**—(1)
- (United States) Richard Sears—**U.S. National Championships**—(1)
- (United Kingdom) Richard Taswell Richardson—**Northern Championships**—(1)
- (Ireland) Peter Aungier—Naas—(1)
- (United States) Arthur Allen—San Gabriel—(1)
- (United Kingdom) G. R. Brewerton —Edgbaston—(1)
- (England) Humphrey Berkeley—Teignmouth—(1)
- (United Kingdom) George Butterworth—Bath—(1)
- (Ireland) John Jameson Cairnes—New York—(1)
- (United States) Joseph Sill Clark Sr.—Richfield Springs—(1)
- (United Kingdom) William Cobbold—East Grinstead—(1)
- (United States) Harry F. Connover—New York—(1)
- (Ireland) E. J. Charley—Belfast—(1)
- (United Kingdom) John William Down—Waterloo—(1)
- (United Kingdom) Mark Minden Fenwick—Newcastle—(1)
- (United Kingdom) A. A. Fuller—Brighton—(1)
- (Canada) Harry D. Gamble—Toronto—(1)
- (United Kingdom) Charles Walder Grinstead—Brentwood—(1)
- (United Kingdom) G. F. Hanson—Belfast—(1)
- (England) Arthur Wellesley Hallward—Darlington—(1)
- (United States) Lawrence Hobart—Montclair—(1)
- (Scotland) John Galbraith Horn—Edinburgh—(1)
- (Australia) L. Keyser—Melbourne—(1)
- (England) Herbert Lawford—Fulham—(1)
- (United Kingdom) G. M. Minchin—Exeter—(1)
- (United Kingdom) William Monement—Norwich—(1)
- (Ireland) Edward Lysaght—Limerick—(1)
- (United Kingdom) William C. Taylor—Eastbourne—(1)
- (United States) Alexander Van Rensselear—Hoboken—(1)
- (United Kingdom) A. Springett—Darlington—(1)
- (United States) Joseph Sill Clark Sr.—Newark—(1)
- (United Kingdom) Frederick C. Stammer—Lichfield—(1)
- (Ireland) Richard Barron Templer—Montrose—(1)
- (Ireland) Robert Shaw Templer—Armagh—(1)
- (United Kingdom) Charles E. Weldon—Bath—(1)
- (United Kingdom) Edward Lake Williams—Fulham—(1)
- (United States) Mr. Winslow—Chestnut Hill—(1)

== See also ==
- 1882 in sports

== Bibliography ==
- Nauright John Dr. Sports Around the World: History, Culture, and Practice

== Sources ==
- Ayre's Lawn Tennis Almanack And Tournament Guide, 1908 to 1938, A. Wallis Myers.
- British Lawn Tennis and Squash Magazine, 1948 to 1967, British Lawn Tennis Ltd, UK.
- Dunlop Lawn Tennis Almanack And Tournament Guide, G.P. Hughes, 1939 to 1958, Dunlop Sports Co. Ltd, UK
- Lawn tennis and Badminton Magazine, 1906 to 1973, UK.
- Lowe's Lawn Tennis Annuals and Compendia, Lowe, Sir F. Gordon, Eyre & Spottiswoode
- Spalding's Lawn Tennis Annuals from 1885 to 1922, American Sports Pub. Co, USA.
- Sports Around the World: History, Culture, and Practice, Nauright John and Parrish Charles, (2012), ABC-CLIO, Santa Barbara, Cal, US, ISBN 1598843001.
- The Concise History of Tennis, Mazak Karoly, (2010), 6th Edition, 2015. ISBN 978-1549746475
- Tennis; A Cultural History, Gillmeister Heiner, (1997), Leicester University Press, Leicester, UK.
- The Tennis Book, edited by Michael Bartlett and Bob Gillen, Arbor House, New York, 1981 ISBN 0-87795-344-9
- The World of Tennis Annuals, Barrett John, 1970 to 2001.
- Total Tennis:The Ultimate Tennis Encyclopedia, by Bud Collins, Sport Classic Books, Toronto, Canada, ISBN 0-9731443-4-3
- Wright & Ditson Officially Adopted Lawn Tennis Guide's 1890 to 1920 Wright & Ditsons Publishers, Boston, Mass, USA.
- http://tennisarchives.com/Tournaments 1882
- https://app.thetennisbase.com/Season Year 1882
