= 1881 women's tennis season =

1881 Women's tennis season
Details
- Duration: 19 April – 8 October
- Edition: 6th
- Tournaments: 39 (Amateur)
- Categories: Important (1); National (0); Provincial/Regional/State (3); County (5); Regular (24)

Achievements (singles)
- Most titles: (England) Gertrude Gibbs (3)
- Most finals: (England) Gertrude Gibbs (3)

The 1881 Women's tennis season was a tennis circuit composed of 39 national, regional, county, and regular tournaments. The season began in April in Cheltenham, England, and ended in October in Queen's Park, Brighton, England.

== Season summary ==
Prior to the creation of the International Lawn Tennis Federation and the establishment of its world championship events in 1913 the Wimbledon Championships, the U.S. National Championships, the Irish Lawn Tennis Championships and the Northern Championships were considered by players and historians as the four most important tennis tournaments to win.

This year for women there would be a tennis circuit of sorts starting to form. 1881 also sees the first indoor tournament for women the Cheltenham Covered Court Championships organised by the Cheltenham Lawn Tennis Club and played on wood courts at the Imperial Winter Gardens, Cheltenham, England.

At the only major event to feature women's competition the Irish Championships in Dublin the women's singles and doubles events were not held, but a mixed doubles event was staged won by Ireland's Mary Abercrombie and England's William Renshaw. In terms of draw size the Exmouth Open was the largest as far as women competitors were concerned with 26 in the main singles draw.

In May 1881 the first national tennis association is formed that being the United States Lawn Tennis Association. At the first official U.S. National Championships there was no women's events and it would be eight years before there would be. In Australia the University of Sydney Lawn Tennis Club formed in 1881 and officially incorporated in 1885, was the only venue in the country following admission of women undergraduates to have active players.

At the 1881 Wimbledon Championships the world's first major tennis tournament, it still remained an all men's event, no women's events were staged. On 26 November 1881 indoor tennis was played inside the 7th Regiment Armory in New York City on with twelve courts for the use of women. In 1913 the International Lawn Tennis Federation was created, that consisted of national member associations. The ILTF through its associated members then became responsible for supervising women's tour events.

== Season results ==
Notes 1: Challenge Round: the final round of a tournament, in which the winner of a single-elimination phase faces the previous year's champion, who plays only that one match. The challenge round was used in the early history of tennis (from 1877 through 1921), in some tournaments not all.

X Indicates challenge round final * Indicates doubles ** mixed doubles

This year 26 singles, 7 doubles and 20 mixed doubles events were held.

Key

Main events.
National events
provincial/state/regional events
County events
Regular events

=== January to March ===
No events

=== April ===
* (denotes doubles) ** (denotes mix doubles)

Ended	Tournament	Winner	Finalist	Semifinalist	Quarterfinalist
23 Apr.	Cheltenham Covered Court Championships; Imperial Winter Gardens; Cheltenham, England; Wood (i); Singles - Doubles - Mix Doubles	(England) Marion Bradley; 3-6, 6-2, 6-2	(England) Florence Mardall	(England) Mary Abercrombie (England) Ellen Ramsay	(England) Edith Atherley (England) Mrs Hill (England) Frances Morris (England) Mrs H. Ramsay
23 Apr.	Cheltenham Covered Court Championships; Imperial Winter Gardens; Cheltenham, England; Wood (i); Singles - Doubles - Mix Doubles	(England) Clara Hill* (England) Ellen Ramsay; 6-1, 6-3	(England) Mrs Dark (England) Miss Jones	(England) Mary Abercrombie (England) Ellen Ramsay	(England) Edith Atherley (England) Mrs Hill (England) Frances Morris (England) Mrs H. Ramsay
23 Apr.	Cheltenham Covered Court Championships; Imperial Winter Gardens; Cheltenham, England; Wood (i); Singles - Doubles - Mix Doubles	(England) Miss Williams** (Ireland) Ernest Browne default	(England) Florence Mardall (England) Henry Blane Porter	(England) Mary Abercrombie (England) Ellen Ramsay	(England) Edith Atherley (England) Mrs Hill (England) Frances Morris (England) Mrs H. Ramsay

=== May ===
Date	Tournament	Winner	Finalist	Semi Finalist	Quarter Finalist
12 May	Devonshire Park Championships (Spring); Devonshire Park LTC; Eastbourne, England; Grass; Singles - Doubles - Mix Doubles	(England) Agnes Watts; 2 sets to 0	(England) E Hudson		
12 May	Devonshire Park Championships (Spring); Devonshire Park LTC; Eastbourne, England; Grass; Singles - Doubles - Mix Doubles	(England) Agnes Watts** (England) Sidney Alfred Noon; 2 sets to 0t	(England) E Hudson (England) E.R. Hudson		
19 May	North Northamptonshire LTC Tournament; Kettering, England; Grass; Singles - Doubles - Mix Doubles -	(England) Rose Collier; 6-0, 6-5	(England) M Blencowe		
19 May	North Northamptonshire LTC Tournament; Kettering, England; Grass; Singles - Doubles - Mix Doubles -	(England) Miss E. Hall * (England) Miss H.B. Upcher; Won			
19 May	West of England Championships; Lansdowne CC; Bath, England; Outdoor; Grass; Singles - Doubles	(England) Gertrude Gibbs; 6-0, 7-5	(England) Annie Layard	(England) Clara Hill	(England) Georgina Kirkby (England) Florence Mardall
19 May	West of England Championships; Lansdowne CC; Bath, England; Outdoor; Grass; Singles - Doubles	(England) Florence Mardall** (England) Henry Blane Porter; 6-0, 8-6	(England) Grace Gibbs (England) William Bush-Salmon	(England) Clara Hill	(England) Georgina Kirkby (England) Florence Mardall
28 May	Irish Championships; Fitzwilliam LTC; Dublin, Ireland; Outdoor; Grass; Singles - Doubles	(England) Mary Abercrombie ** (England) William Renshaw; 6–3, 5–7, 6–2, 6–3	(Ireland) Miss Costello (Ireland) Spencer Duncan Maul		

=== June ===
** (denotes mix doubles)

Ended	Tournament	Winner	Finalist	Semi Finalist	Quarter Finalist
4 Jun	West of England Championships; Lansdowne CC; Bath, England; Grass; Singles - Doubles	(England) Gertrude Gibbs; 6-0, 7-5	(England) Annie Layard	(England) Clara Hill	(England) Georgina Kirkby (England) Florence Mardall
4 Jun	West of England Championships; Lansdowne CC; Bath, England; Grass; Singles - Doubles	(England) Florence Mardall** (England) Henry Blane Porter; 6-0, 8-6	(England) Grace Gibbs (England) William J. Bush-Salmon	(England) Clara Hill	(England) Georgina Kirkby (England) Florence Mardall
19 Jun.	Liverpool Cricket Club Lawn Tennis Tournament; Liverpool CLTC; Liverpool II, England; Grass; Singles - Doubles	(England) Miss Nixon * (England) Miss Black; Won	(United Kingdom) Miss F. Fitzroy (United Kingdom) Algernon Aylmer		
26 Jun.	North Northamptonshire LTC Tournament; North Northants LTC; Kettering II, England; Grass; Singles - Doubles	(England) Miss A. Stobart * (England) Miss E. Hunt; Def	(England) Miss E. Hall (England) Miss F. Lightfoot		
26 Jun.	North Northamptonshire LTC Tournament; North Northants LTC; Kettering II, England; Grass; Singles - Doubles	(England) Mrs Upcher (England) Mr. A. Pulteney def	(England) Miss Bell (England) Mr H. Stockdale		

=== July ===
* (denotes doubles) ** (denotes mix doubles)

Ended	Tournament	Winner	All comers' finalist	Semifinalist	Quarterfinalist
2 Jul	Championship of the Sydney LTC; Sydney LTC; Bath II, England; Grass; Singles - Doubles	(England) Miss Freeling; Won	(England) ?		
7 Jul.	Ripon Club Tournament; Ripon LTC; Ripon, England; Grass; Singles - Doubles	(England) Miss Healey ** (England) Mr A.J. Wise; 2–1 sets	(England) Miss Springett (England) Mr. J. L. Shann		
11 Jul.	Tonbridge LTC Tournament; Tonbridge LTC; Tonbridge, England; Grass; Singles - Doubles	(England) Miss Gorham ** (England) Mr C. Lachlan; 2–1 sets	(England) Miss Springett (England) Mr. J. L. Shann		
12 Jul.	Bedfordshire LTC Tournament; Bedfordshire LTC; Blenham, England; Grass; Singles - Doubles	(England) Miss L. Archdale; Won	(England) ?		
16 Jul	Staffordshire C.C.C. Tournament; Staffordshire Lawn Tennis Club; Lichfield, England; Outdoor; Grass; Singles - Doubles - Mix Doubles -	(England) Rose Collier; 6-0, 6-5	(England) M Blencowe		
16 Jul	Staffordshire C.C.C. Tournament; Staffordshire Lawn Tennis Club; Lichfield, England; Outdoor; Grass; Singles - Doubles - Mix Doubles -	(England) M Blencowe** (England) A. Blencowe; 6-1, 6-3	(England) Mrs Peters-Smith (England) A Denton		
23 Jul	Edgbaston Open Tournament; Edgbaston, England; Outdoor; Grass; Singles	(England) Maud Watson; 6-3 6-1 6-4	(England) Lilian Watson	(England) K. Stretton	(England) K.H. Cartland (England) Miss Chamberlain (England) K. Holliday
23 Jul	Edgbaston Open Tournament; Edgbaston, England; Outdoor; Grass; Singles	(England) Lilian Watson* (England) Maud Watson; 6-1, 6-3	(England) K. Cartland * (England) L. Hutton	(England) K. Stretton	(England) K.H. Cartland (England) Miss Chamberlain (England) K. Holliday
26 Jul.	Norwich Open; Norwich LTC; Norwich, England; Grass; Singles - Doubles	(England) Miss M. Raikes; 6-3, 3-6, 6-2	(England) Miss Burleigh		
30 Jul	London Athletic Club Open Tournament; Stamford Bridge, England; Grass; Singles - Doubles	(England) M Raikes; 5-0, 5-2	(England) Miss Burleigh		

=== August ===
(*denotes doubles) (**denotes mix doubles)

Ended	Tournament	Winner	Finalist	Semi Finalist	Quarter Finalist
1 Aug.	Hexham Tournament; Hexham LTC; Hexham, England; Grass; Singles - Doubles	(England) Miss Gibson ** (England) Jasper Gibson; 2–0 sets	(England) Mrs Peters-Smith (England) Mr A Denton		
4 Aug.	Cirencester Park Lawn Tennis Tournament; Earl Bathurst Estate; Cirencester Park; Cirencester, Gloucestershire, England; Outdoor; Grass; Singles - Doubles	(England) Gertrude Gibbs	(England) Marian Smith		
6 Aug	Darlington Association Tournament; Darlington, England; Grass; Singles - Mix Doubles	(England) Ethel Surtees; 3-6, 6-3, 6-1	(England) Alice Cheese	(England) LML Turner	(England) Minnie Congreve (England) Winifred Fenwick (England) Mrs JB Dale
6 Aug	Darlington Association Tournament; Darlington, England; Grass; Singles - Mix Doubles	(England) Alice Cheese ** (England) J.B. Dale; 9-7, 6-3	(England) Winifred Fenwick (England) Percival C. Fenwick	(England) LML Turner	(England) Minnie Congreve (England) Winifred Fenwick (England) Mrs JB Dale
6 Aug	County Kildare Championship; County Limerick CC; Naas, Ireland; Outdoor; Grass; Singles –	(Ireland) Miss C. Vesey; Won	(Ireland) Miss F. Metcalfe		
6 Aug	County Kildare Championship; County Limerick CC; Naas, Ireland; Outdoor; Grass; Singles –	(England) Miss F. Metcalfe ** (Ireland) Algeron Aylmer won			
6 Aug	Waterford Annual Lawn Tennis Tournament; Waterford Cricket Club; Waterford, County Waterford, Ireland; Grass; Singles	(Ireland) May Langrishe; 6-2, 6-1	(Ireland) Adela Langrishe	(Ireland) Ann Gallwey	(Ireland) Miss Hunt (Ireland) Beatrice Langrishe
8 Aug	Waterloo LTC Tournament; Waterloo LTC; Liverpool, England; Grass; Singles - Doubles	(England) K. Rayner; 6-0 6-0	(England) L. Cheetham	(England) H. Rayner	(England) Alice Bagnall-Wild (England) A. Barry
8 Aug	Waterloo LTC Tournament; Waterloo LTC; Liverpool, England; Grass; Singles - Doubles	(England) A. Barry * (England) F. Helder; 6-2, 3-6, 6-1	(England) Miss Jardine (England) Miss Jones	(England) H. Rayner	(England) Alice Bagnall-Wild (England) A. Barry
8 Aug	Waterloo LTC Tournament; Waterloo LTC; Liverpool, England; Grass; Singles - Doubles	(England) K. Rayner ** (England) J.F. Carde; 6-1, 12-10	(England) Alice Bagnall-Wild (England) E. Bucknell	(England) H. Rayner	(England) Alice Bagnall-Wild (England) A. Barry
10 Aug	South Berkshire Tournament; South Berks LTC; Caversham, England; Grass; Singles –	(England) Miss Stokes; Won			
12 Aug	Exmouth Tournament; Exmouth, England; Grass; Singles	(Ireland) Lilian Cole; 6-0, 6-0	(England) Eveline Belfield	(England) Maude Taylor	(England) Mary Hoare (England) M. Smith
12 Aug	Exmouth Tournament; Exmouth, England; Grass; Singles	(England) Georgiana Kindersley ** (England) Henry Kindersley; 2-6, 7-5, 7-5	(Ireland) Lilian Cole (Ireland) Thomas Arembery Tombe	(England) Maude Taylor	(England) Mary Hoare (England) M. Smith
12 Aug	North of Ireland Championships; Cliftonville CC; Belfast, Ireland; Grass; Singles - Doubles	(Ireland) Miss Charley ** (United Kingdom) C. Goldsmid; 2–1 sets	(Ireland) Miss. Spunner (United Kingdom) Mr. C.H. Wright		
19 Aug.	Waterford Tournament; Cliftonville CC; Waterford, Ireland; Grass; Singles - Doubles	(Ireland) Miss Knox ** (Ireland) R Knox; 2–1 sets	(Ireland) Beatrice Langrishe (England) William Renshaw		
21 Aug	South of Ireland Championships; County Limerick CC; Limerick, Ireland; Grass; Singles - Doubles	(Ireland) Marian Smith; 8-6, 6-1	(Ireland) Miss Westropp	(Ireland) Mary Lysaght	
26 Aug.	Teignmouth and Shaldon Tournament; Teignmouth LTC; Teignmouth, England; Grass; Singles - Doubles	(England) Miss Power ** (England) Charles Cole def	(England) Miss Robinson (England) Champion Russell		
30 Aug	South Wales Championships; Tenby LTC; Tenby, Wales; Grass; Singles - Doubles	(Wales) Miss Kemmis ** (England) P.J. Ashe; 8-6, 6-1	(Wales) Miss Jones (England) Mr Rock		
31 Aug	Sittingbourne & Gore Court Ladies Open; Gore Court LTC; Sittingbourne, England; Grass; Singles –	(England) Miss M Malden; 6–3, 6–3	(England) Miss Goodwin		
31 Aug	Aldershot Division Open; Aldershot Division LTC; Aldershot, England; Grass; Singles –	(United Kingdom) Miss Draper; 2–0 sets	(United Kingdom) Miss Pritchard		

=== September ===
(* denotes doubles)

Ended	Tournament	Winner	Finalist	Semi Finalist	Quarter Finalist
2 Sep.	Vale of Clwyd CLTC Open; Vale of Clwyd CLTC; Denbigh, Wales; Grass; Singles - Doubles	(Wales) Miss L Williams; 5–3, 5–3	(England) Miss Proctor		
8 Sep	Highclere Park Tournament; Highclere, England; Grass; Singles - Doubles	(England) Miss Arkwright; 6–4, 6–1	(England) Miss Johnson		
15 Sep.	St Leonards-on-Sea Tournament; Saint Leonards LTC; St Leonards-on-Sea, England; Grass; Singles - Doubles	(England) Augusta Langley; 4-6, 6-2, 6-3	(England) Constance Smith	(England) Miss Smith	
17 Sep.	Torquay LTC Tournament; Torquay LTC; Torquay, England; Grass; Singles - Doubles	(England) Miss Coulthard ** (England) Mr.W. Ware; 2–1 sets.	(Ireland) Lilian Cole (Ireland) Thomas A. Tombe		
19 Sep.	White Rose York Tournament; White Rose LTC; York, England; Grass; Singles - Doubles	(England) Miss Smith ** (England) Mr Burke def.	(England) Miss Smith (England) Mr A. Hotham		
24 Sep.	East Gloucestershire Championships; Montpelier Gardens; Cheltenham, England; Outdoor; Grass; Singles	(England) Gertrude Gibbs; 6-4, 6-4	(England) Miss Perry	(England) Marion Bradley (England) Clara Hill	(England) Mary Abercrombie (England) Florence Mardall (England) Ellen Ramsay
24 Sep.	East Gloucestershire Championships; Montpelier Gardens; Cheltenham, England; Outdoor; Grass; Singles	(England) Clara Hill * (England) Ellen Ramsay; 6-1, 6-3	(England) Mrs Dark (England) Miss Jones	(England) Marion Bradley (England) Clara Hill	(England) Mary Abercrombie (England) Florence Mardall (England) Ellen Ramsay

=== October ===
(*denotes doubles) (**denotes mix doubles)

Ended	Tournament	Winner	Finalist	Semi Finalist	Quarter Finalist
1 Oct.	Sussex County Lawn Tennis Tournament; Brighton, England; Grass; Singles - Doubles	(England) Edith Coleridge; 6-5, 6-2	(England) Leila Lodwick	(England) M. Walker	
1 Oct.	Sussex County Lawn Tennis Tournament; Brighton, England; Grass; Singles - Doubles	(England) Miss Maltby * (England) E. Munt; 6-2, 6-2	(England) Miss Saint-Clair (England) M. Walker	(England) M. Walker	
1 Oct.	Sussex County Lawn Tennis Tournament; Brighton, England; Grass; Singles - Doubles	(England) E. Munt ** (England) H.B. Thornhill; 6-3, 6-1	(England) Leila Lodwick (England) Orlando R. Coote	(England) M. Walker	
8 Oct.	Brighton Lawn Tennis Club Tournament; Queen's Park, England; Grass; Singles	(England) Edith Coleridge; 6-5, 4-6, 6-2	(England) Eva Adshead	(England) Leila Lodwick	
8 Oct.	Brighton Lawn Tennis Club Tournament; Queen's Park, England; Grass; Singles	(England) Miss Munt ** (England) H.B. Thornhill; 6-3, 6-1	(England) Leila Lodwick (England) Orlando R. Coote	(England) Leila Lodwick	

=== November to December ===
No events

== Tournament Winners ==
=== Singles ===
This is list of winners sorted by number of singles titles (# and main titles in bold)

- (England) Gertrude Gibbs (**3**) Bath, Cheltenham II, Cirencester
- (England) Edith Coleridge (**2**) Brighton, Queens Park
- (England) Miss M. Raikes (**2**) Norwich, Stamford Bridge
- (United Kingdom) Miss Draper (**1**) Aldershot
- (England) Miss L. Archdale (**1**) Blenham
- (England) Miss Stokes (**1**) Caversham
- (England) Marion Bradley (**1**) Cheltenham
- (England) Ethel Surtees (**1**) Darlington
- (Wales) Miss L. Williams (**1**) Denbigh
- (England) Agnes Watts (**1**) Eastbourne
- (England) Maud Watson (**1**) Edgbaston–(1)
- (Ireland) Lilian Cole (**1**) Exmouth
- (England) Miss Arkwright (**1**) Highclere
- (England) Miss A. Jackson (**1**) Kettering
- (England) Rose Collier (**1**) Lichfield
- (England) Marian Smith (**1**) Limerick
- (England) Kate Rayner (**1**) Liverpool
- (Ireland) Miss C. Vesey (**1**) Naas
- (England) Miss M Malden (**1**) Sittingbourne
- (England) M Raikes (**1**) Stamford Bridge
- (England) Marion Langley (**1**) St. Leonards-on-Sea
- (Ireland) May Langrishe (**1**) Waterford

=== Doubles ===
This is list of winners sorted by number of doubles titles (# and main titles in bold)

- (England) Clara Hill & (England) Ellen Ramsay (**2**) Cheltenham, Cheltenham II
- (Ireland) Connie Butler & (Ireland) May Langrishe (**1**) **Irish Championships**
- (England) Miss Maltby & (England) E. Munt (**1**) Brighton
- (England) Lilian Watson & (England) Maud Watson (**1**) Edgbaston
- (England) A. Barry & (England) F. Helder (**1**)Liverpool–(1)

=== Mixed Doubles ===
This is list of winners sorted by number of mixed doubles titles (# and main titles in bold)

- (England) Mary Abercrombie & (England) William Renshaw (**1**) **Irish Championships**
- (Ireland) Miss Costello & (Ireland) Spencer D. Maul (**1**) Eastbourne
- (England) Florence Mardall & (England) Henry Blane Porter (**1**) Bath
- (England) E. Munt & (England) H.B. Thornhill (**1**) Brighton
- (England) Alice Cheese & (England) J.B. Dale (**1**) Darlington
- (England) Miss Williams & (Ireland) Ernest Browne (**1**) Cheltenham
- (England) Agnes Watts & (England) Sidney Alfred Noon (**1**) Eastbourne
- (England) Georgiana Kindersley & (England) Henry Kindersley (**1**) Exmouth
- (England) M Blencowe & (England) A. Blencowe (**1**) Lichfield
- (England) K. Rayner & (England) J.F. Card (**1**) Liverpool
- (England) Miss Munt & (England) H.B. Thornhill (**1**) Queens Park
- (England) Miss Coulthard * (England) Mr.W. Ware (**1**) Torquay
- (England) Miss Smith & (England) Mr Burke (**1**) York

== Statistical summary ==
- Total Tournaments–(39)
- Most Titles— (England) Gertrude Beatrice Gibbs—(3)
- Most Finals— (England) Gertrude Beatrice Gibbs–(3)
- Most Matches Played— (England) Gertrude Beatrice Gibbs–(10)
- Most Matches Won— (England) Gertrude Beatrice Gibbs–(10)
- Match Winning %— (England) Gertrude Beatrice Gibbs—(100.0%)
- Most Tournaments Played— (England) Gertrude Beatrice Gibbs–(5)
- Most Head to Head Meetings— (England) Miss M. Raikes & (England) Miss Burleigh–(6)
