= Pacific Pro Championships =

Defunct tennis tournament
- Tour: Pro Tennis Tour
- Founded: 1967
- Abolished: 1967
- Editions: 1
- Location: San Diego, California; United States
- Venue: San Diego Sports Arena
- Category: Professional
- Surface: Wood / indoor
- Draw: 10

The Pacific Pro Championships was a men's professional indoor wood court tennis tournament founded in 1967. Also known as the Pacific Professional Championships or the Pacific Pro. It was played at San Diego Sports Arena, San Diego, California, United States for one edition when it was discontinued.

== History ==
The 1967 Pacific Pro Championships were organizes by Jack Kramer as part of the men's Pro Tennis Circuit that season and ran from May 10 to May 14, 1967. It featured a smaller, highly elite 10-man singles draw playing in a 4 round knockout elimimation format.

The event was won by Rod Laver who defeated Dennis Ralston for the singles title.

== Past finals ==
=== Singles ===
Year	Champions	Runners-up	Score
1967	(Australia) Rod Laver	(United States) Dennis Ralston	6–4, 12–10

==== 3rd & 4th place ====
Year	Champions	Runners-up	Score
1967	(United States) Butch Buchholz	(United Kingdom) Mike Davies	6–2, 7–5

=== Doubles ===
Year	Champions	Runners-up	Score
1960	(Australia) Rod Laver (Australia) Fred Stolle	(United States) Butch Buchholz (United Kingdom) Mike Davies	10–5

== Players ==
Included:

- (Peru) Alex Olmedo
- (United States) Barry MacKay
- (United States) Butch Buchholz
- (United States) Dennis Ralston
- (Australia) Fred Stolle
- (Chile) Luis Ayala
- (United Kingdom) Mike Davies
- (Ecuador) Pancho Segura
- (France) Pierre Barthes
- (Australia) Rod Laver
