= Agricultural Hall Tournament =

Tennis tournament held in England in 1882

Defunct tennis tournament
- Tour: Mens Amateur Tour (1877–1912)
- Founded: 1882
- Abolished: 1882
- Editions: 1
- Location: Islington, Middlesex, England
- Venue: Royal Agricultural Hall
- Surface: indoor (wood)

The Agricultural Hall Tournament also called the Tournament at the Agricultural Hall was an early Victorian era men's tennis indoor wood court tennis tournament held at the Royal Agricultural Hall, Islington, Middlesex, England. It appears it was staged only once in June 1882.

== History ==
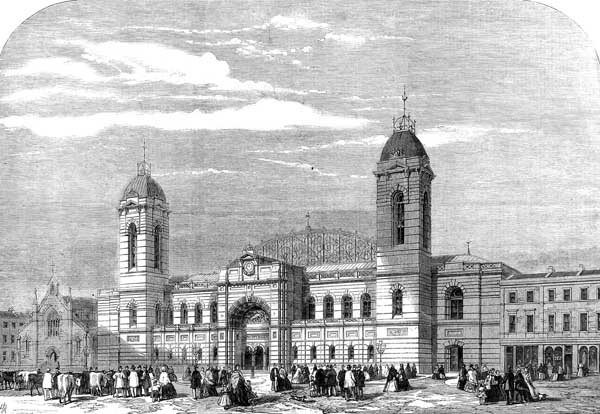
Agricultural Hall Islington in 1861

The Agricultural Hall Tournament was an early 19th century indoor tennis event staged only one time at the Royal Agricultural Hall, Islington, Middlesex, England.

A description of the event that concluded on 20 June 1882:

This tournament was arranged to benefit the funds of the London Fever Hospital and the Convalescent Home for Scarlet Fever and included some interesting competitions resulting as follows:

— Lawn Tennis, Routledge's Sporting Annual (1883). p. 114.

This tournament feature some notable players of the day including two time Scottish Champion John Gailbraith Horn, future British Covered Court Championships winner (1886) Teddy Williams, Irish Championships and Northern Championships finalist Ernest Browne, up and coming tennis player Harry Grove, and Sussex Championships winner Donald Stewart.

== Finals ==
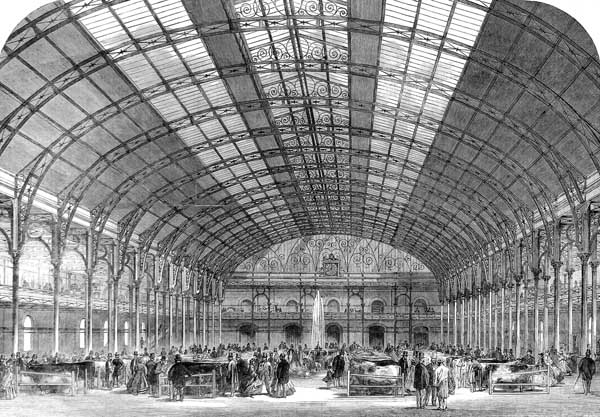
Agricultural Hall Islington indoors view in 1861

Incomplete roll

=== Mens Challenge Cup ===
Year	Winner	Runner-up	Score
1882	(United Kingdom) Teddy Williams	(Ireland) Ernest Browne	5-7, 6–4, 10-8

=== Oxford and Cambridge Challenge Cup ===
Year	Winner	Runner-up	Score
1882	(United Kingdom) Robert W. Braddell	(England) Hubert Hope Wilkes	6-2, 6-2

=== Mappin and Webb Cup ===
Year	Winner	Runner-up	Score
1882	(Ireland) Peter Aungier		

=== Gentlemen's Doubles ===
Year	Winner	Runner-up	Score
1882	(Ireland) Ernest Browne (Ireland) Peter Aungier	(United Kingdom) Champion Branfill Russell (Scotland) John Galbraith Horn	7-5, 6–0, 6-3

== Sources ==
- Nieuwland, Alex (2011–2022). "Edition – Agricultural Hall Tournament 1882". www.tennisarchives.com. Netherlands: Tennis Archives.
- Palmers Index to the Times: (30 June 1882). Samuel Palmer. London. England.
- Routledge's Sporting Annual (1883). George Routledge and Sons. London. England.
