= Minden Fenwick =

Tennis player (1864–1938)

- Country (sports): Great Britain; New Zealand
- Born: 18 December 1864 Newcastle upon Tyne, Northumberland, England
- Died: 8 February 1938 (aged 73) Hastings, New Zealand
- Turned pro: 1881 (amateur)
- Retired: 1904

Singles
- Career record: 63–25
- Career titles: 5

Grand Slam singles results
- Wimbledon: 3R (1881)

Mixed doubles

Minden Fenwick (18 December 1864 – 8 February 1938) was an English then later New Zealand tennis player active during the late 19th century and early 20th century. His best results in major tournaments came at the 1881 Wimbledon Championships where he reached the third round in the men' singles. Between 1881 and 1904 he contested 13 career singles finals, and won 5 titles.

In New Zealand his name was often spelt Fenwicke.

== Career ==
=== In England ===
In 1881 Fenwick played his first event at the Darlington Association Tournament at Darlington, County Durham where he reached the quarter-finals before losing to his brother Mark Fenwick. The same year he reached the semi-finals stage of the Northern Championships. In July 1881 he played at the Wimbledon Championships where he reached the third round stage, before he was beaten by George S. Murray Hill.

In 1882 he was a finalist at the Portland Park LTCC Tournament at Newcastle upon Tyne where he lost to E.A. Simpson, he also reached the finals of the Darlington Association Tournament where he was beaten by Arthur Wellesley Hallward. The same year he also took part in the prestigious Prince's Club Championships where he lost to Ireland's Peter Aungier in the second round.

In 1883 he won his first notable title at the Derbyshire Championships held at Buxton where he defeated Robert Parsons Earwaker. The same year he reached the finals of the Northumberland Championships at Newcastle upon Tyne before he was beaten by his brother Mark Fenwick. In 1884 he was a losing finalist at two events that year, the first at the Northumberland Cricket Club Open tournament where he lost to E.M. Sinclair for the second time, and at the Northumberland County Club Tournament.

=== In New Zealand ===
Around 1885 Fenwick emigrated to New Zealand with most members of his family. In 1886 he took part in the Napier Open tournament at Napier, New Zealand where he reached the final before losing to Eric Pollard Hudson. The same year he played at the Canterbury Championships in Christchurch which he won defeating William Millton in the final. In 1888 he took part in the New Zealand Championships where he reached the final, but lost to his brother Percival Clennell Fenwick. In 1889 he won the New Zealand Championships against Joy Marshall. In 1890 he failed to defend his New Zealand national title where he was beaten by Joy Marshall who avenged his previous year's defeat.

In 1892 he entered for play at the New Zealand Championships where he reached the final for the third time, this time winning his second title against Richard Harman. In 1893 he retained his New Zealand national title for the third and final time. In 1904 he played his last singles event at the Ashburton tournament at Ashburton, New Zealand where he exited early in the first round. He retired from playing tennis thereafter.

Fenwick was elected president of the New Zealand Lawn Tennis Association in September 1929.

== Career finals ==
=== Singles 13 (5 titles, 8 runners-up) ===
Category + (Titles)
Grand Slam (0)
National (3)
International (0)
Provincial/Regional/State (0)
County (1)
Regular (1)

Titles by Surface
Clay – Outdoor (0)
Grass – Outdoor (5)
Hard – Outdoor (0)
Carpet – Indoor (0)
Wood – Indoor (0)

Result	No.	Date	Tournament	Surface	Opponent	Score
Loss	1.	1882	Portland Park LTCC Tournament	Grass	(United Kingdom) E.A. Simpson	6–5 6–4
Loss	2.	1882	Darlington Association Tournament	Grass	(England) Arthur Hallward	6–1 4–6 6–1 6–3
Win	3.	1883	Derbyshire Championships	Grass	(England) Robert P. Earwaker	6–2 6–3
Loss	4.	1883	Northumberland Championships	Grass	(England) Mark Fenwick	3 sets to 0
Loss	5.	1884	Northumberland Cricket Club Open	Grass	(United Kingdom) E.M. Sinclair	2–6 6–4 4–6 6–4 6–2
Loss	6.	1884	Northumberland County Club	Grass	(United Kingdom) E.M. Sinclair	2–6 6–4 4–6 6–4 6–2
Loss	7.	1886	Napier Open	Grass	(New Zealand) Eric P. Hudson	6–1 6–2 6–3
Win	8.	1886	Canterbury Championships	Grass	(New Zealand) William Millton	6–3 6–4 6–3
Loss	9.	1888	New Zealand Championships	Grass	(New Zealand) Percival C. Fenwick	4–6 4–6 6–1 6–4 9–7
Win	10.	1889	New Zealand Championships	Grass	(New Zealand) Joy Marshall	6–4 0–6 6–3 6–3
Loss	11.	1890	New Zealand Championships	Grass	(New Zealand) Joy Marshall	6–3 6–4 10–8
Win	12.	1892	New Zealand Championships	Grass	(New Zealand) Richard Harman	1–6 7–5 9–7 3–6 6–4
Win	13.	1893	New Zealand Championships	Grass	(New Zealand) Patrick Marshall	1–6 6–3 6–4 6–3

== Work career ==
Minden worked as an electoral Returning officer at Mangateretere near Hastings, New Zealand. In that capacity, he oversaw the Hawkes Bay petition against voting irregularities that occurred 24 February 1915. He retired thereafter.

== Personal life ==
Fenwick married Constance Lawford in St Paul's Church, Auckland, in December 1894.
