= Cester =

Cester may refer to:

- Chris Cester, drummer of the band Jet
- Enrico Cester, Italian volleyball player
- Nic Cester, lead singer of the band Jet
- -cester, a variant of Chester (placename element)

== Cirencester Park ==
- Cirencester Park (country house)
- Cirencester Park (cricket ground)
