= Bavarian Indoor Championships =

Defunct tennis tournament
- Tour: ILTF World Circuit
- Founded: 1953; 72 years ago
- Abolished: 1971; 54 years ago
- Location: Marktredwitz; Munich
- Surface: Carpet / indoor Wood / indoor

The Bavarian Indoor Championships was a men's and women's tennis tournament founded in 1953 as the Bavarian International Covered Court Championships.

Also known as the Bavarian International Indoor Championships it was mainly held in Munich, Bavaria, West Germany until 1971 when it was discontinued.

== History ==
The tournament was established in 1953 and was originally played on indoor wood courts, in 1970 the surface switched to carpet courts. The event was mainly held in Munich with the exception of 1971 the final edition which was played in Marktredwitz when it was discontinued. This tournament was the men's precursor event to the Munich WCT event founded in 1973 that was also played on indoor carpet courts until 1975 before it was discontinued. In 1980 a men's Munich Indoor Invitation tournament was revived for one season under the sponsorship name the Braun 1980 Tennis Cup that was won by Jimmy Connors. In 1983 the WCT was revived for two editions only till 1984.

== Finals ==
=== Men's singles ===
(Incomplete roll)

Year	Location	Champions	Runners-up	Score
1953	Munich	(Socialist Federal Republic of Yugoslavia) Milan Branović	(West Germany) Rupert Huber	6-4, 4–6, 6–1, 6–2.
1954	Munich	(Socialist Federal Republic of Yugoslavia) Milan Branović (2)	(West Germany) Rupert Huber	6-2, 6–2, 2–6, 8–6.
1955	Munich	(West Germany) Rupert Huber	(Socialist Federal Republic of Yugoslavia) Milan Branović	6-2, 3–6, 6–1, 6–2.
1966	Munich	(West Germany) Wilhelm Bungert	(United Kingdom) Jaroslav Drobný	6-3, 6–2, 6–2.
1967	Munich	(West Germany) Wilhelm Bungert (2)	(Czechoslovakia) Milan Holeček	7-5, 4–6, 6–4.
1968	Munich	(Denmark) Jorgen Ulrich	(West Germany) Karl Meiler	7-5, 4–6, 6–4.
1969	Munich	(West Germany) Jurgen Fassbender	(West Germany) Karl Meiler	6-4, 8–6, 7–5.
1970 (Note: The 1970 edition of the Championships were also valid as the German Indoor Championships.)	Munich	(United Kingdom) John Clifton	(Sweden) Håkan Zahr	6–3, 1–6, 6–3
1971	Marktredwitz	(West Germany) Jurgen Fassbender (2)	(West Germany) Helmut Fickentscher	6-8, 6–3, 6–4.

=== Women's singles ===
(Incomplete roll)

Year	Location	Champions	Runners-up	Score
1966	Munich	(West Germany) Helga Niessen	(Austria) Sonja Pachta	6-1, 7–5.
1967	Munich	(Czechoslovakia) Vlasta Vopickova	(West Germany) Kerstin Seelbach	3-6, 7–5, 6–2
1968	Munich	(West Germany) Edda Buding	(United Kingdom) Frances MacLennan	6-3, 2–6, 6–1
1969	Munich	(Netherlands) Betty Stöve	(West Germany) Katja Ebbinghaus	6-4, 6–4
1970 (Note: The 1970 edition of the Championships were also valid as the German Indoor Championships.)	Munich	(United Kingdom) Virginia Wade	(United Kingdom) Joyce Williams	6–2, 6–4
