= Arthur Hallward =

Arthur Wellesley Hallward
- Country (sports): United Kingdom
- Born: 4 March 1860 Shepard's Bush, London, England
- Died: 29 October 1930 Lelant, Cornwall, England
- Turned pro: 1882 (amateur)
- Retired: 1898

Singles
- Career record: 108–56
- Career titles: 2

Grand Slam singles results
- Wimbledon: QF (1893)

Grand Slam doubles results
- Wimbledon: QF (1896)

Arthur Wellesley Hallward (4 March 1860 – 29 October 1930) was an English tennis player active during the 19th century. His best results in major tournaments came at the 1893 Wimbledon Championships where he was a losing quarter finalist in the men' singles, and 1896 where he was a losing quarter finalist in the 1896 Men's doubles. Between 1882 and 1898 he contested 7 career singles finals, and won 2 titles.

== Tennis career ==
In 1882 Hallward played his first tournament, and won only title at the Darlington Association Tournament at Darlington, County Durham against Minden Fenwick. In 1883 he failed to retain his Darlington title losing to Herbert Wilberforce. In 1886 he reached the All Comers final at Darlington again, but was beaten by Arthur Pease. In 1887 he won the Molesey Park Lawn Tennis Tournament at Molesey against Charles Hoadley Ashe Ross. In 1888 he reached the final of the Hitchin tournament, but lost Arthur Gore.

In 1891 he reached the final of the Middlesex Championships at Chiswick Park, Chiswick, Middlesex before losing to Ernest George Meers. In 1893 he reached the quarter-finals stage at the Wimbledon Championships, before losing to Harry Sibthorpe Barlow in five close sets. In 1894 he was a finalist at North London Hard Courts Championships at Stamford Hill and played on clay where he lost to Arthur Gore. In 1896 he reached the quarter-finals of men's doubles event at the Wimbledon Championships partnering the American player Arthur Foote where they lost to Laurence Doherty and RB Scott in four sets. In 1898 he played his final singles event at the London Championships at the Queen's Club, London where he was defeated by Harold Mahony in the second round.

== Career finals ==
=== Singles 7 (2 titles, 5 runners-up) ===
Category + (Titles)
Grand Slam (0)
National (0)
International (0)
Provincial/Regional/State (0)
County 0)
Regular (2)

Titles by Surface
Clay – Outdoor (0)
Grass – Outdoor (2)
Hard – Outdoor (0)
Carpet – Indoor (0)
Wood – Indoor (0)

Notes: 1886 result was an all comers final.

| Result | No. | Date | Tournament | Surface | Opponent | Score |
|---|---|---|---|---|---|---|
| Win | 1. | 1882 | Darlington Association Tournament | Grass | (United Kingdom) Minden Fenwick | 6–1, 4–6, 6–1, 6–3 |
| Loss | 1. | 1883 | Darlington Association Tournament | Grass | (England) Herbert Wilberforce | 2–6 1–6, 1–6 |
| Loss | 2. | 1886 | Darlington Association Tournament | Grass | (England) Arthur Godfrey Pease | 4–6, 1–6, 3–6 |
| Win | 2. | 1887 | Molesey Park Lawn Tennis Tournament | Grass | (United Kingdom) Charles Hoadley Ashe Ross | 6–5, 6–1 |
| Loss | 3. | 1888 | Hitchin Tournament | Grass | (United Kingdom) Arthur Gore | 6–3, 3–6, 3–6 |
| Loss | 5. | 1891 | Middlesex Championships | Grass | (England) Ernest George Meers | 6–2, 9–7, 6–1 |
| Loss | 4. | 1894 | North London Hard Courts Championships | Clay | (United Kingdom) Arthur Gore | 4–6 6–2 6–3 6–2 |

== Work career ==
Arthur Hallward was a civil servant and worked at Scotland Yard.

== Personal and family ==
Arthur was born in Shepards Bush London in 1860. In 1885 he married Caroline S Marley.
