= County Galway LTC Tournament =

Tennis tournament in Ireland

Defunct tennis tournament
- Founded: 1879; 146 years ago
- Abolished: 1880; 145 years ago
- Location: Lisbeg, County Galway, Ireland
- Venue: County Galway Lawn Tennis Club
- Surface: Grass

The County Galway LTC Tournament a late Victorian era grass court tennis tournament staged first staged in August 1879. The tournament was organised by the County Galway Lawn Tennis Club, and held at Lisbeg, County Galway, Ireland. The tournament was held only two times and ended in 1880.

== History ==
The County Galway LTC Tournament was a grass court tennis event first staged from 6 to 8 August 1879. This tournament was held for two edition only, and appeared to have ended. This event was organised by the County Galway Lawn Tennis Club, and held at Lisbeg, County Galway, Ireland. The first men's singles title was won by William Henry George Eyre, and the second men's singles event was won by Ernest de Sylly Hamilton Browne.

== Finals ==
=== Men's Singles ===
Incomplete roll:

Year	Winner	Finalist	Score
1879	(Ireland) William Henry George Eyre	(United Kingdom of Great Britain and Ireland) W. Peebles	6-5, 6-5, 6-2, 6-2, 6-5.
1880	(Ireland) Ernest Browne	(Ireland) John Eyre	6-4 6-1 6-2.

=== Mixed Doubles ===
Year	Winner	Finalist	Score
1879	(Ireland) William Henry George Eyre (Ireland) Miss Eyre	(United Kingdom of Great Britain and Ireland) W. Peebles (England) Miss Bird	def.

== Sources ==
- Nieuwland, Alex. "Tournament – County Galway". www.tennisarchives.com. Tennis Archives.
- Travers, Alan. "About Us". gltc.ie. Galway Lawn Tennis Club.
- The Field. (9 August 1879) London, England: British Newspaper Archives.
