= 1882 in sports =

1882 in sport describes the year's events in world sport.

== Athletics ==
- USA Outdoor Track and Field Championships

== American football ==
College championship

- College football national championship – Yale Bulldogs

Events

- At the 1882 rules meeting, Walter Camp proposes that a team be required to advance the ball a minimum of five yards within three downs. These down-and-distance rules, combined with the already-established line of scrimmage, transform the game from a variation of rugby or association football into the distinct sport of American football.

== Association football ==
England

- FA Cup final – Old Etonians 1–0 Blackburn Rovers at The Oval, the first time that a professional club has reached the final
- Tottenham Hotspur founded as Hotspur FC by members of the Hotspur Cricket Club in Tottenham.

Ireland

- 18 February — Ireland makes its international debut, losing 13–0 to England in Belfast. Ireland is the world's fourth international team following England, Scotland and Wales.

Scotland

- Scottish Cup final – Queen's Park 4–1 Dumbarton (replay following a 2–2 draw)

Australia

- The New South Wales English Football Association, also known as the South British Football Soccer Association, is founded by John Walker Fletcher, who also established Wanderers Football Club, considered the first Australian soccer club. The NSWEFA is one of the first football associations outside of the United Kingdom. Using the name 'English Football' distinguished it from rugby and Victorian Rules, which were also prominent in Australia.

== Bandy ==
Events

- Charles G. Tebbutt of the Bury Fen bandy club is responsible for the first published rules of bandy and also for introducing the game into the Netherlands and Sweden, as well as elsewhere in England.

== Baseball ==
National championship

- National League v. American Association – Chicago White Stockings (NL) 1–1 Cincinnati Reds (AA)

Events

- Foundation of Cincinnati Reds, Pittsburgh Pirates and St. Louis Cardinals
- The American Association opens in six southerly cities from St. Louis to Philadelphia, a new professional baseball league that will rival the NL.
- The National League completes two years with one circuit, eight northerly cities from Chicago to Boston.

== Biking ==
- February 22 - New York City's 24 hour bike race wins James Saunders, who ran 120 miles and won 100 dollars

== Boxing ==
Events

- 7 February — John L. Sullivan defeats Paddy Ryan in nine rounds at Mississippi City to claim the Heavyweight Championship of America. Apart from Sullivan's famous 1889 fight against Jake Kilrain, this is the last major bareknuckle contest fought under London Prize Ring Rules. Sullivan will increasingly fight under Queensberry Rules from now on using gloves and will become the first generally recognised World Heavyweight Champion from 1885.

== Canadian Football ==
- Britannia Football Club play Montreal Football Club on the 13th of May, with a 0-0 tie as the final score
- Britannia play the Royal Military College team, which ends in a 1-1 tie. They play Montreal again, winning 1-0, before defeating McGill 2-0 to win the city championship.

== Cricket ==
Events

- England, led by Alfred Shaw, tours Australia and plays a four-match Test series. Australia wins the series 2–0.
- 8 April (approx.) — formation of Warwickshire County Cricket Club at a meeting in Coventry
- 10 May — formation of Durham County Cricket Club
- 8, 9 & 10 June — Somerset County Cricket Club plays its inaugural first-class match v. Lancashire at Old Trafford and joins the County Championship, but for only four seasons initially.
- 28 & 29 August — England v. Australia at The Oval (only Test of the season). Australia wins the most famous match in history by 7 runs with F. R. Spofforth, the original "Demon Bowler", taking 7–46 and 7–44. Soon afterwards, The Sporting Times prints its legendary obituary notice:

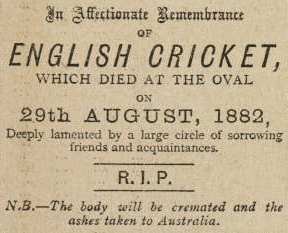
The death notice which first named the Ashes

In Affectionate Remembrance
of
ENGLISH CRICKET,
which died at the Oval
on
29th AUGUST, 1882,
Deeply lamented by a large circle of sorrowing
friends and acquaintances
----
R.I.P.
----
N.B.—The body will be cremated and the
ashes taken to Australia.

England

- Champion County – Lancashire and Nottinghamshire share the title
- Most runs – Billy Murdoch 1,582 @ 31.64 (HS 286*)
- Most wickets – Ted Peate 214 @ 11.52 (BB 8–32)

Australia

- Most runs – Billy Murdoch 679 @ 61.72 (HS 321)
- Most wickets – Joey Palmer 47 @ 21.55 (BB 7–46)

== Golf ==
Major tournaments

- British Open – Bob Ferguson

== Horse racing ==
England

- Grand National – Seaman
- 1,000 Guineas Stakes – St. Marguerite
- 2,000 Guineas Stakes – Shotover
- The Derby – Shotover
- The Oaks – Geheimniss
- St. Leger Stakes – Dutch Oven

Australia

- Melbourne Cup – The Assyrian

Canada

- Queen's Plate – Fanny Wiser

Ireland

- Irish Grand National – Chantilly
- Irish Derby Stakes – Sortie

USA

- Kentucky Derby – Apollo
- Preakness Stakes – Vanguard
- Belmont Stakes – Forester

== Lacrosse ==
Events

- The first high school lacrosse teams are formed: Phillips Academy, Phillips Exeter Academy and the Lawrenceville School.
- Seven colleges form the first Intercollegiate Lacrosse Association (ILA), which was later replaced by the Intercollegiate Lacrosse League in 1905 (which was renamed the U.S. Intercollegiate Lacrosse Association in 1929).

== Rowing ==
The Boat Race

- 1 April — Oxford wins the 39th Oxford and Cambridge Boat Race

England

- Leicester Rowing Club was formed

== Rugby football ==
Events

- Foundation of Waterloo R.F.C.

== Tennis ==
England

- Wimbledon Men's Singles Championship – William Renshaw (GB) defeats Ernest Renshaw (GB) 6–1 2–6 4–6 6–2 6–2

USA

- American Men's Singles Championship – Richard D. Sears (USA) defeats Clarence M. Clark (USA) 6–1 6–4 6–0

World

- The 6th pre-open era 1882 Men's Tennis season gets underway 43 tournaments are staged this year from 24 April to 12 November.
