= New England Indoor Championships =

Defunct tennis tournament
- Tour: ILTF World Circuit (1932–69) men (1932-72) women ILTF Independent Circuit (1970–72) men (1973) women
- Founded: 1932; 93 years ago
- Abolished: 1973; 52 years ago
- Location: Agawam; Brookline; Longwood; Randolph; Salem; Westport
- Venue: Various
- Surface: Wood; Carpet

The New England Indoor Championships was a men's and women's tennis tournament founded in 1932. Also known in its early years as the New England Covered Court Championships, it was first organised by the New England Lawn Tennis Association and played at the Longwood Covered Courts, Longwood Cricket Club, Longwood, Massachusetts, United States and played on wood courts then later switching to carpet courts. The event was held in different locations until 1973 as part of the ILTF Independent Circuit when it was discontinued.

== History ==
The tournament was founded in 1932. The championships were organised by the New England Lawn Tennis Association (f.1927). The tournament was usually played in February for men and sometimes in March annually for women until the early 1950s it was played at the Longwood Covered Courts, at the Longwood Cricket Club, Longwood, Massachusetts, United States.

The men's tournament continued to be held in February and moved location to Westport, Massachusetts till 1966, the women's event continued be held in March and moved location to Salem, Massachusetts until 1968. The men's championships were also staged in Randolph, Massachusetts and finally Pembroke, Massachusetts. The women's event also moved location again this time to Agawam, Massachusetts. In 1973 it was downgraded from the worldwide ILTF independent circuit becoming a USTA circuit event only.

== Finals ==
=== Men's singles ===
(incomplete roll)

New England Men's Indoor Championships
Year	Location	Champion	Runner-up	Score
↓ ILTF World Circuit ↓
1941	Longwood	(United States) Bill Talbert	(United States) Sidney Schwartz	6–3, 4–6, 6–3.
1959	Westport	(Denmark) Jan Leschly	(United States) Frank Froehling	4–6, 7–5, 6–2.
1961	Westport	(United States) Frank Froehling	(United States) Tony Vincent	7–5, 6–4.
1963	Westport	(Mexico) Rafael Osuna	(United States) Tony Vincent	3–6, 6–4 6–3.
1964	Westport	(United States) Tony Vincent	(United States) Bob Barker	6–4, 6–2.
1965	Westport	(United States) Tony Vincent (2)	(United States) Bob Barker	6–3, 8–6.
1966	Westport	(United States) Eugene Scott	(United States) Bob Barker	6–3, 5–7, 9–7.
1967	Randolph	(United States) Tony Vincent (3)	(United States) Chauncey Steele III	6–2, 6–4.
1968	Randolph	(United States) Bill Tym	(United States) Chauncey Steele III	2–6, 6–3, 8–6.
↓ Open era ↓
1969	Randolph	(United States) Ted Hoehn	(United States) Chauncey Steele III	3–6, 8–6, 16–14.
↓ ILTF Independent Circuit ↓
1970	Pembroke	(United States) Ted Hoehn (2)	(United States) John Ingard	6–2, 7–5.
1971	Pembroke	(United States) Vitas Gerulaitis	(United States) Ted Hoehn	6–2, 7–5.
1972	Pembroke	(United States) Bob Kulig	(United States) Ferdi Taygan	7–6, 7–6.

=== Women's singles ===
(incomplete roll)

New England Women's Indoor Championships
Year	Location	Champion	Runner-up	Score
↓ ILTF World Circuit ↓
1935	Longwood	(United States) Kay Winthrop	(United States) Dorrance Chase	10–8, 7–5
1936	Longwood	(United States) Kay Winthrop (2)	(United States) Virginia Rice Johnson	6–3, 4–6, 6–4
1938	Longwood	(United States) Pauline Betz	(United States) Kay Winthrop	6–2, 6–4
1939	Longwood	(United States) Pauline Betz (2)	(United States) Virginia Rice Johnson	6–3, 6–0
1940	Longwood	(United States) Kay Winthrop (3)	(United States) Marjorie Sachs Pickhardt	6–4, 6–3
1947	Brookline	(United States) Kay Winthrop (4)	(United States) Helen Pedersen Rihbany	6–2, 2–6, 6–3
1950	Longwood	(United States) Midge Gladman Buck	(United States) Baba Lewis	6–1, 6–2
1953	Longwood	(Australia) Thelma Coyne Long	(United States) Patricia Canning Todd	6–4, 6–4
1965	Salem	(Netherlands) Trudy Groenman	(United States) Mary-Ann Eisel	6–4, 2–6, 6–3
1966	Salem	(United States) Tory Ann Fretz	(United States) Mary-Ann Eisel	3–6, 6–2, 6–3
1967	Salem	(United States) Mary-Ann Eisel	(United States) Billie Jean Moffitt King	6–4 5–7 11–9
1968	Salem	(United States) Billie Jean King	(United States) Mary-Ann Eisel	6–3, 6–4
↓ Open era ↓
1969	Agawam	(United States) Mary-Ann Eisel (2)	(South Africa) Esmé Emmanuel	7–5, 6–2
1970	Agawam	(United States) Mary Ann Curtis (3)	(United States) Pam Teeguarden	4–6, 6–2, 7–5
