= Pau Championships =

Championnats de Pau Pau Championships

Defunct tennis tournament
- Tour: ILTF World Circuit (1913–27)
- Founded: 1890; 136 years ago
- Abolished: 1927; 99 years ago
- Location: Billère; Pau; Tarbes
- Venue: Trinquet Club de Beaumont; Tennis Club Pau
- Surface: Clay / outdoor

The Pau Championships or Championnats de Pau was a men's and women's clay court tennis tournament was founded in 1890 as the Pau International Tournament and also known as the Tournoi International de Pau. The tournament was first played in Trinquet Club de Beaumont, Pau, Pyrénées-Atlantiques, France. It was played annually till 1927.

== History ==
In 1887 the Lawn Tennis Trinquet Club de Beaumont was founded and (later renamed as the Pau Tennis Club). In 1890 it organised an open international tennis event then called the Pau International Tournament. In 1902 the tournaments name was changed to the Pyrenees Championships. In 1906 the events name was altered again to the Basses-Pyrénées Championships. by the late 1920s the tournament was branded under the name Championnats de Pau or Pau Championships. In 1920 the Trinquet Club de Beaumont to Tennis Club Pau. The tournament was held in various locations such as Billère, Pau, and Tarbes.

Successor tournaments being held in Pau include and the most recent being an ATP Challenger event founded in 2019 called the Teréga Open Pau–Pyrénées for sponsorship reasons, or simply known as the Pau–Pyrénées Open.

== Finals ==
=== Men's singles ===
(incomplete roll)

Year	Champions	Runners-up	Score
1894	(Germany) Victor Voss	(Ireland) Manliffe Goodbody	6–4, 7–5.
1897	(France) Albert F. Philippe de Luze	(France) Paul Lebreton	6–3, 2–6, 6–1.
1909	(France) Jean Cintrat	(France) Édouard Derazey	6–3, 6–1.
1912	(France) Max Decugis	(France) Jean Montariol	2–6, 6–4, 6–4.
1921	(Romania) Nicolae Mishu	(France) Jean-Pierre Samazeuilh	6–3, 6–1.

=== Women's singles ===
(incomplete roll)

Year	Champions	Runners-up	Score
1890	(Wales) Edith Austin	(Ireland) May Geary	def
1903	(United Kingdom) Mrs Russell-Davies	(France) Mlle. d'Elva	6–2, 6–0
1905	(France) Mlle. d'Elva	(France) Mme. Donne	6–0, 6–0
1906	(France) Mlle. d'Elva	(France) Mlle. Vansittart	6–2 6–1
1927	(France) Marguerite Broquedis	(France) Bella Pons	6–4, 2–6, 7–5

=== Mixed doubles ===
(incomplete roll)

Year	Champions	Runners-up	Score
1905	(France) Albert F. Philippe de Luze (France) Mlle. d'Elva	(Spain) Jose de Olozabal (Germany) Comtesse de Miramon	6–3, 6–3, 6–2.
1906	(France) André Jousselin (Germany) Comtesse de Miramon	(France) Pierre Portes (France) Mlle. d'Elva	6–3, 6–3, 6–2.

== Event names ==
In French

- Tournoi International de Pau (1890-1899)
- Championnat dés Pyrénées (1901–05, 1907–11)
- Championnat dés Basses-Pyrénées (1906)
- Championnats de Pau (1912–27)
