= New York and District Championships =

Defunct tennis tournament
- Founded: 1882; 143 years ago
- Abolished: 1883; 142 years ago
- Location: Staten Island, New York City, United States
- Venue: Staten Island Cricket and Baseball Club
- Surface: Grass

The New York and District Championships was a men's grass court tennis tournament held at the Staten Island Cricket and Baseball Club, Staten Island, New York City, United States for only two editions in 1882 and 1883.

== History ==
The New York and District Championships was a late 19th century tennis event first staged in June 1882 at the Staten Island Cricket and Baseball Club, Staten Island, New York City, United States The first and final known winner of the men's singles was American player Richard Field Conover who defeated Frank Sherman Benson 6–1, 0–6, 6–5 in the final. The final known men's edition in 1883 was won by American player Clarence M. S. Clark who defeated the British player William Glyn.

== Finals ==
=== Men's Singles ===
| Year | Winner | Runner-up | Score |
|---|---|---|---|
| 1882 | (United States) Richard Field Conover | (United States) Frank Sherman Benson | 6–1, 0–6, 6–5 |
| 1883 | (United States) Clarence Munroe Clark | (United Kingdom) William Glyn | 6–4, 4–6, 6–2 |
