= Cheltenham Covered Court Championships =

Defunct tennis tournament
- Event name: Cheltenham Covered Courts
- Tour: Mens Amateur Tour (1877–1912)
- Founded: 1881
- Abolished: 1881
- Editions: 1
- Location: Cheltenham, Gloucestershire, England
- Venue: Imperial Winter Gardens
- Surface: Wood (indoor)

The Cheltenham Covered Court Championships also called the Cheltenham Covered Courts was a men's and women's indoor wood court tennis tournament staged from 19 to 23 April 1881 only at the Imperial Winter Gardens, Cheltenham, Gloucestershire, England. It was one of the earliest locations in England to stage an indoor wood court tennis event.

== History ==
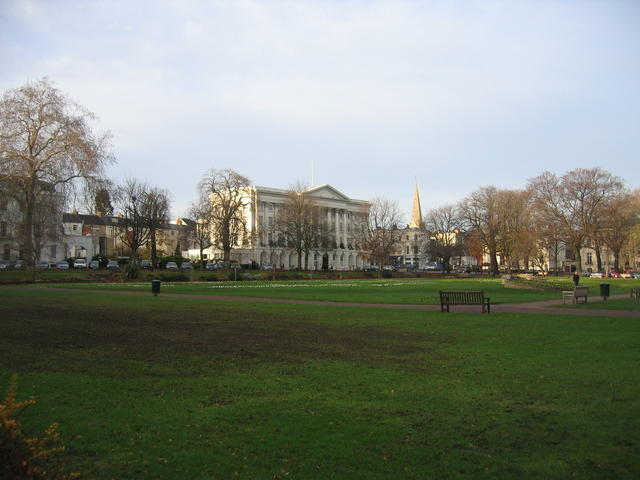
The Imperial Winter Gardens, Cheltenham today.

The Cheltenham Covered Court Championships was an early Victorian era men's and women's indoor wood court tennis tournament staged from the 19th to 23 April 1881 only at the Imperial Winter Gardens, Cheltenham, Gloucestershire, England. Cheltenham was first towns in England to have a covered court.

== Description of event ==
A description of the event that concluded on 23 April 1881 .

“The Cheltenham Lawn Tennis Club have been the first to set the ball rolling this season, and fixed upon Tuesday last for their opening tournament. It being rather early to be playing the game out of doors, it was determined to bring off the matches under cover, so the beautiful courts in the Imperial Winter Gardens were obtained for the week. The principal events were the ladies' and gentlemen's matches for the Covered Court Championships, and for these entries of sixteen and fourteen respectively had been obtained, amongst which might be noticed the names of many good players. The men's singles title was won by England's Ernest Renshaw who defeated Irelands Ernest de Sylly H. Browne 3 sets to 1. The women's singles title was won by England's Marion Bradley who defeated England's Florence Mardall 2 sets to 1. The event was probably the first indoor tennis event staged and was played on fast hard wood courts.

— Lawn Tennis, The Field, 23 April 1881

== Description of venue ==
A description of the venue.

“In November 1878 the Winter Garden and Skating Rink opened, designed by J. T. Darby – Cheltenham's own Crystal Palace. Flanked by gardens, tennis courts and a bowling green, the Winter Gardens extended from the back of the present Town Hall almost to the Broad Walk. The immense iron roof, which rose to a height of 100ft, was constructed by the Central Iron Works at Lansdown. The building housed one of the earliest roller-skating rinks in the country, measuring 15,000 sq. ft.

— Site of the Winter Gardens Historic Public Gardens of Cheltenham, Original by the Cheltenham History Society.

== Finals ==
=== Men's Singles ===
Year	Champions	Runners-up	Score
1881	(England) Ernest Renshaw	(Ireland) Ernest Browne	6–2, 3–6, 6–1, 8–6.

=== Women's Singles ===
Year	Champions	Runners-up	Score
1881	(England) Marion Bradley	(England) Florence Mardall	3–6, 6–2, 6–2.

=== Men's Doubles ===
Year	Champions	Runners-up	Score
1881	(England) William Renshaw (England) Ernest Renshaw	(United Kingdom) George Butterworth (United Kingdom) G. Harrison	?.

=== Women's Doubles ===
Year	Champions	Runners-up	Score
1881	(England) Clara Hill (England) Ellen Ramsay	(England) Mrs Dark (England) Miss Jones	6–1, 6–3.

=== Mix Doubles ===
Year	Champions	Runners-up	Score
1881	(Ireland) Ernest Browne (England) Miss Williams	(England) Henry Blane Porter (England) Florence Mardall	?.

== Sources ==
- Baltzell, E. Digby (2013). Sporting Gentlemen: Men's Tennis from the Age of Honor to the Cult of the Superstar. Piscataway, New Jersey, United States: Transaction Publishers. ISBN 978-1-4128-5180-0.
- Nieuwland, Alex. "Tournament – Cheltenham Covered Courts". www.tennisarchives.com. Netherlands: Tennis Archives.
- Routledge's Sporting Annual (1882). George Routledge and Sons. London.
- Tingay, Lance (1977). 100 Years of Wimbledon. London: Guinness Superlatives Ltd. ISBN 978-0-900424-71-7.
- Site of the Winter Gardens - Historic Public Gardens of Cheltenham - PocketSights". pocketsights.com. PocketSights, LLC. 2021.
