= Richfield Springs Tournament =

Defunct tennis tournament
- Founded: 1882; 143 years ago
- Abolished: 1882; 143 years ago
- Location: Richfield Springs, New York, United States
- Venue: Richfield Country Club
- Surface: Grass

The Richfield Springs Tournament was a men's grass court tennis tournament first held at the Richfield Country Club courts at Richfield Springs, New York, United States for one edition only in 1882.

== History ==
The Richfield Springs tournament was a men's grass court tennis tournament first held on courts at the Richfield Springs Country Club, Richfield Springs, New York, USA for one edition only in 1882. The first and only winner of the men's singles was American Joseph Sill Clark Sr. who defeated Mr. Arthur C. Denniston.

== Finals ==
=== Men's Singles ===
Year	Winner	Runner-up	Score
1882	(United States) Joseph Sill Clark Sr.	(United States) Arthur Charles Denniston	6–4, 2–6, 6–5, 6–1
