= Edward Lysaght =

Irish poet and wit (born 1763)

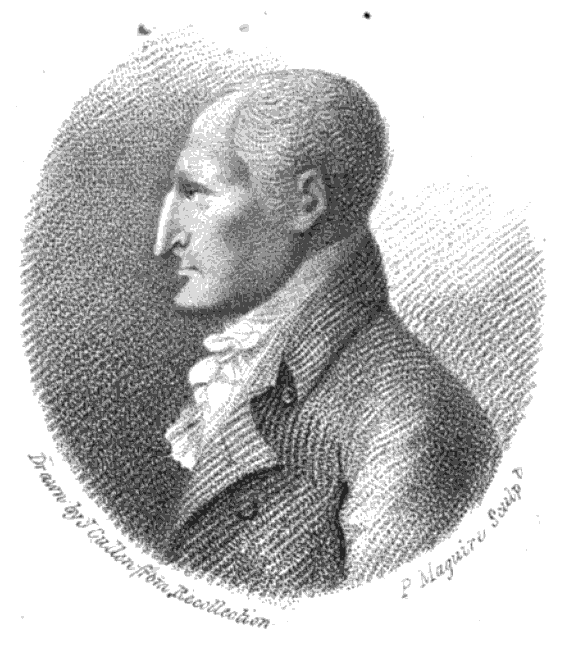
Likeness, printed with the posthumous edition of his Poems (Dublin, 1811)

Edward Lysaght (21 December 1763 – 1810 or 1811) was an Irish poet and wit. Educated at Trinity College, Dublin, and Oxford, he practiced law in both England and Ireland before settling in Dublin, where he became a well-known literary figure. He is now remembered for his patriotic Irish songs.

== Life ==
Edward Lysaght, born 21 December 1763, was the son of John Lysaght of Brickhill, a gentleman of respected protestant family in county Clare. His mother was Jane Eyre, daughter of Edward Dalton of Deerpark in the same county. He was educated at Dr. Hare's school at Cashel and at Trinity College, Dublin, where he graduated BA. He was incorporated in the same degree at Oxford (19 October 1787) as a member of St Edmund Hall, and proceeded MA at Oxford in 1788. In 1784 he became a student at the Middle Temple, London, and at the King's Inns, Dublin. In Easter term 1788 he was called to the English bar, joining the profession in Ireland later in the same year. He spent some years in England, being employed as counsel in many election petitions, and he acted in that capacity for Samuel, Lord Hood, in the petition arising out of the celebrated Westminster contest with Charles James Fox in 1784. Ultimately he abandoned the English for the Irish bar, and, becoming a member of the Munster circuit, enjoyed for a time considerable practice. He was appointed a commissioner of bankruptcy, and a few months before his death was made a police magistrate for Dublin.

Family escutcheon, printed with his likeness (Dublin, 1811)

The last seventeen years of Lysaght's life were spent mainly in Dublin, where he became a notable figure in society, especially in literary and theatrical circles, and achieved a reputation as bon vivant, wit, and improvisatore. He was also a political squib writer and pamphleteer. Barrington states in his Personal Sketches that, though posing as an opponent of the Union, he took 400l from Castlereagh to write in the government interest. This statement wants authority, and was probably penned in revenge for a lampoon by Lysaght on Barrington's book in a paper called The Lantern. Lysaght died in 1810 or 1811 in very impoverished circumstances. A subscription raised by the bench and bar of Ireland for the benefit of his widow and two daughters realised 2,484l.

== Legacy ==
Lysaght was the godfather of Sydney Owenson, Lady Morgan, in whose praise several of his complimentary verses were written. Lysaght's Poems were published in 1811, after his death, by his son-in-law, Dr. Griffin, afterwards bishop of Limerick; but the patriotic songs, like "The Man who led the Van of the Irish Volunteers", which most contributed to his fame, were omitted from this collection. "The Sprig of Shillelagh", by H. B. Code, has been, with other popular songs, assigned to Lysaght in error. Many of Lysaght's authentic songs are preserved in Lover's Irish Lyrics and other Irish anthologies. His serious songs are much in the manner of Thomas Moore, who said of him that "all his words were like drops of music".
