= Liverpool Cricket Club Lawn Tennis Tournament =

Defunct tennis tournament
- Event name: Tournament of the Liverpool Cricket Club
- Founded: 1881
- Abolished: 1883
- Editions: 3
- Location: Aigburth Cricket Ground, Liverpool, Lancashire, England
- Venue: Liverpool Cricket Club
- Surface: Grass

The Liverpool Cricket Club Lawn Tennis Tournament. was an early Victorian era men's grass court tennis tournament first staged in June 1881 at the Liverpool Cricket Club, Aigburth Cricket Ground, Liverpool, Lancashire, England. The inaugural men's singles event was won by Richard Taswell Richardson a two time Wimbledon finalist. It was staged only three times until 1883.

== History ==
The Liverpool Cricket Club Lawn Tennis Tournament was an early open men's and women's grass court tennis tournament first stage in 1881 at the Liverpool Cricket Club, Aigburth Cricket Ground, Liverpool, Lancashire, England. This was same venue where the prestigious Northern Championships were also held in alternating years between the Northern Lawn Tennis Club in Manchester and the Aigburth ground.

A description of the event that concluded on 18 June 1881:

On Thursday, 16th, the tournament of the Liverpool Cricket Club commenced, the Gentleman's singles in this competition proving a very easy affair for R.T. Richardson, who had no opponent worthy of his steel.

— Lawn Tennis in 1881, Routledge's Sporting Annual (1882). p. 68.

== Finals ==
Incomplete Rolls

=== Gentleman's singles ===
Year	Winner	Runner-up	Score
1881.	(United Kingdom) Richard Richardson	(United Kingdom) Reginald Herbert Jones	6–0, 6–0

=== Gentleman's pairs ===
Year	Winner	Runner-up	Score
1881.	(United Kingdom) E. T. Richardson (United Kingdom) Richard Richardson	(United Kingdom) Reginald Herbert Jones (England) C.P. Smith	6–1, 6–4

=== Ladies pairs ===
Year	Winner	Runner-up	Score
1881.	(England) Miss. Hunt (England) Miss. Eyton	(United Kingdom) Mrs. Nixon (England) Miss. Black	beat

== Sources ==
- Routledges Sporting Annual (1882) Lawn Tennis in 1881. George Routledge and Son. London.
- The Field. Saturday 18 June 1881. London. England.
- The Field. Saturday 14 July 1883. London. England.
