= Ripon Open =

UK tennis tournament (1880–1939)

Defunct tennis tournament
- Founded: 1880; 146 years ago
- Abolished: 1939; 87 years ago
- Location: Ripon, North Yorkshire, England
- Venue: Ripon Lawn Tennis Club
- Surface: Grass

The Ripon Open was a combined men's and women's grass court tennis tournament established founded in 1880 as the Ripon Club Tournament It was staged at the Ripon Lawn Tennis Club, Ripon, North Yorkshire, England and ran through until 1939 when it was abolished.

== History ==
On 2 August 1880 the Ripon Club Tournament was established, and played until 3 August 1880. The winner of the gentleman's singles was Arthur Richard Springett who defeated Northing Pinckney Snowden. In 1881 the edition that year featured a mixed doubles event won by Miss Healey and Mr A.J. Wise who defeated Miss Springett and Mr. J. L. Shann by 2 sets to 0. The tournament was still being held just before the start of World War II, the ladies doubles final was won by Miss M. Rudd and Miss Sheppard who beat Miss. Nutt and Miss Lambert. No further records of the tournament can be found after the war and appears not to have been resumed.
