= Cirencester Park Lawn Tennis Tournament =

Tennis tournament in England

Defunct tennis tournament
- Founded: 1881; 144 years ago
- Abolished: 1906; 119 years ago
- Location: Cirencester Park, Bathurst Estate, Cirencester, Gloucestershire, England
- Surface: Grass

The Cirencester Park Lawn Tennis Tournament was a late Victorian era and early Edwardian era combined men's and women' grass court tennis event founded in 1881. It was held at Cirencester Park on the Bathurst Estate, Cirencester, Gloucestershire, England, through until 1906.

== History ==
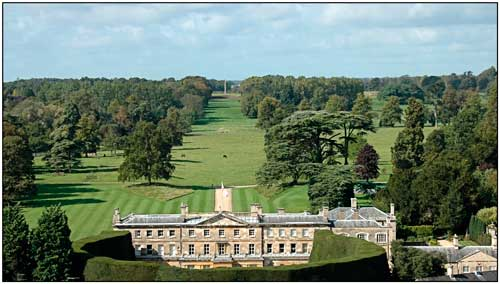

(Photo of Cirencester Park and house taken on 11 September 2004 the location of this tournament)

The Cirencester Park Lawn Tennis Tournament was established in 1881 at Oakley Park, on the Bathurst Estate, Cirencester, Gloucestershire, England. In 1882 at the second edition of the tournament the ladies doubles final was won by Miss Gertrude Gibbs and Miss M Smith.

In 1891 The annual gathering for the Cirencester Park Lawn Tennis Tournament concluded on Friday 8 August, with the prizes for the event being given by the Earl Bathhurst as president of the club and Mr. J. Field honorary secretary. The tournament continued to be staged up to at least 1906, before it appears to have been abandoned. Notable winners of the gentleman's singles title is Charles Lacy Sweet who won two times in 1882 and 1883.
