= Clara Hill =

German musician

- Origin: Berlin, Germany
- Genres: Folktronica; acid jazz; electronic; broken beat; deep house; downtempo; experimental
- Occupations: Singer-songwriter; co-producer
- Years active: 2001–present
- Website: clarahill.com

Clara Hill is a musician born in Berlin. She writes, produces and performs with a varied array of artists. Her discography includes 6 full-length albums, and many 12“s featuring names of electronica artists like Jazzanova, King Britt, Marc Mac (4 Hero), Atjazz, Shuya Okino (Kyoto Jazz Massive), Vikter Duplaix and Dixon. Coming from a singer-songwriter / acid jazz / electronica background.

Clara produced and released her fifth LP together with King Britt in 2016 called Pendulous Moon The album was re-released in 2021 on Atjazz record Company. Her sixth album Shine was released in 2020.

== Discography ==
=== Albums ===
- Restless Times (2004 Sonar Kollektiv)
- All I Can Provide (2006 Sonar Kollektiv)
- Folkwaves-Sideways (2007 Sonar Kollektiv)
- Walk The Distance (2013 Tapete Records)
- Pendulous Moon (2016 KingBrittArchives)
- Shine (2020 Black Pearl Records)
- Pendulous Moon Deluxe Edition (2021 Atjazz record Company)

=== Singles ===
- "Here" (2003)
- "Restless Times" (2005)
- "Silent Distance" (2005)
- "Did I Do Wrong" (2006)
- "Nowhere (I Can Go)" (2006)
- "Paperchase" (2006)
- "Everything" (2007)
- "Be like that" (2007)
- "Sad Girl" (2008)
- "Lost Winter" (2013)
- "Insomnia" (2014)
- "Dripstone Cave" (2014)
- "Lonely Glow" (2016)
- "Silent Roar" (2016)
- "Before the day awakes" (2020)
- "Spiral Wind & Clouds" (2021)
