= North Berkshire ALTC Tournament =

Defunct tennis tournament
- Founded: 1882; 143 years ago
- Abolished: 1886; 139 years ago
- Location: Abingdon, North Berkshire, England
- Venue: North Berkshire Archery and Lawn Tennis Club
- Surface: Grass

The North Berkshire ALTC Tournament was a late Victorian era men's and women's grass court tennis tournament organised by the North Berkshire Archery and Lawn Tennis Club, Abingdon, North Berkshire, England from 1882 until 1886.

== History ==
The North Berkshire ALTC Tournament was a men's and women's grass court tennis tournament organised by the North Berkshire Archery and Lawn Tennis Club, Abingdon, North Berkshire, England from 1882 until 1886.
