= Richard Richardson (tennis) =

British tennis player (1852–1930)

- Full name: Richard Taswell Richardson
- Country (sports): United Kingdom
- Born: 9 August 1852 Broughton, Hampshire, United Kingdom
- Died: 16 May 1930 (aged 77) Capenhurst, Cheshire, United Kingdom
- Turned pro: 1880 (amateur tour)
- Retired: 1884

Singles
- Career titles: 4

Grand Slam singles results
- Wimbledon: F (1881, 1882)

Doubles

Grand Slam doubles results
- Wimbledon: 1R (1884)

Richard Taswell Richardson (9 August 1852 – 16 May 1930) was a British tennis player in the early years of Wimbledon. He also played cricket.

== Tennis career ==
Richardson's tennis career was brief but successful. He won the important Northern Championships three times in 1880, 1881 and 1882 (beating Ernest Renshaw in 1882). At the Wimbledon Championships in 1880, Richardson lost to Herbert Lawford in five sets in round three.

In May 1881, he was defeated by Herbert Lawford again in the final of the Irish Lawn Tennis Championships in Dublin (at the time considered as prestigious a title to win as Wimbledon).

In June 1881, he was a finalist at the Waterloo LTC Tournament in Liverpool, on 18 June he also won the inaugural Liverpool Cricket Club Lawn Tennis Tournament against Reginald Herbert Jones. In July 1881, at the Wimbledon Championship's he beat Ernest Renshaw in the final play off before losing to William Renshaw in the All comer's final at Wimbledon.

At Wimbledon Championship's in 1882 Richardson beat Otway Woodhouse before losing to Ernest Renshaw in the All comer's final. At Wimbledon 1883 he lost his first match to Charles Grinstead and didn't play the tournament again. Richardson was also a fine cricketer. He played 5 matches for the MCC from 1876 to 1877.

He played his last career tournament at Waterloo in Liverpool in June 1884 losing to Donald Stewart in four sets in the semi-finals.

== Grand Slam finals ==
=== Singles (2 runners-up) ===
Result	Year	Championship	Opponent	Score
Loss	1881	Wimbledon Championships	(United Kingdom) William Renshaw	4–6, 2–6, 3–6
Loss	1882	Wimbledon Championships	(United Kingdom) Ernest Renshaw	5–7, 3–6, 6–2, 3–6

== Career finals ==
=== Singles: 7 (4 titles, 3 runners-up) ===
Note: (L) denotes Liverpool as location (M) Manchester tournament alternated till 1929

Legend (3-4)
Winner
Runner up

Result	No.	Date	Tournament	Surface	Opponent	Score
Win	1.	May 1880	Northern Lawn Tennis Championships (M)	Grass	(United Kingdom) Walter Edwin Fairlie	6–0, 6–3, 6–0
Loss	1.	May 1881	Irish Championships	Grass	(Scotland) Herbert Lawford	7–5, 5–7, 6–3, 4–6, 7–9
Win	2.	Jun 1881	Waterloo Tournament	Grass	(England) N. C. Jones	6–0, 6–0
Win	3.	Jun 1881	Northern Lawn Tennis Championships (M)	Grass	(United Kingdom) John Comber	6–1, 6–1, 6–0
Loss	2.	Jul 1881	Wimbledon Championships	Grass	(United Kingdom) William Renshaw	4–6, 2–6, 2–6
Win	4.	May 1882	Northern Lawn Tennis Championships (L)	Grass	(United Kingdom) Ernest Renshaw	6–1, 3–6, 5–7, 6–4, 11–9
Loss	3.	Jul 1882	Wimbledon Championships	Grass	(United Kingdom) Ernest Renshaw	5–7, 3–6, 6–2, 3–6

== Cricket career ==
Richardson also played first-class cricket for the Marylebone Cricket Club in 1876 and 1877, making five appearances. He scored 160 runs in these five matches, averaging 22.85 and with a high score of 48.

== Personal life ==
He was the son of Richard Richardson of Broughton, Hampshire. He graduated B.A. at University College, Oxford in 1876; and 1879 he was called to the bar at the Inner Temple. He was a Justice of the Peace.

== Sources ==
- Nauright, John; Parrish, Charles (2012). Sports Around the World: History, Culture, and Practice. ABC-CLIO. ISBN 9781598843002.
