= Brackley LTC Tournament =

Defunct tennis tournament
- Founded: 1882; 143 years ago
- Abolished: 1882; 143 years ago
- Editions: 1
- Location: Brackley, West Northamptonshire, England
- Venue: Brackley Lawn Tennis Club
- Surface: Grass

The Brackley LTC Tournament was a late Victorian era combined men's and women's grass court tennis tournament staged only one time from 1 to 6 August 1882 at the Brackley Lawn Tennis Club, Brackley, West Northamptonshire, England.

== History ==
The Brackley LTC Tournament was a tennis event held between August 1st and August 6th 1882 as part of the Brackley Show. The gentleman's singles event was won by Mr. Francis Regner Brooksbank Pinhorn who defeated Mr. William Blencowe. The mixed doubles event was won by Mr. John Boyd and Miss Mary Blencowe who defeated Mr. Patrick Smyth and Mrs. Winifred Barlow.

== Results ==
=== Mens Singles ===
Year	Winner	Runner-up	Score
1882	(United Kingdom) Francis Regner Brooksbank	(United Kingdom) William Blencowe	def.

=== Mixed Doubles ===
Year	Winner	Runner-up	Score
1882	(United Kingdom) Rev. John W. Boyd (United Kingdom) Miss. Mary Blencowe	(United Kingdom) E.V.E. Bryan (United Kingdom) Miss. A. Barlow	def.
