= Peter Aungier =

Irish tennis player

- Country (sports): Ireland
- Born: c. 1855 Liverpool, England
- Died: 11 May 1914 (aged 59) Farnham, Surrey, England
- Turned pro: 1879 (amateur)
- Retired: 1884

Singles
- Career record: 26–9
- Career titles: 5

Peter Aungier (1855 - 11 May 1914) was an Irish lawn tennis player. In three of the major tournaments of the late 19th century, he was a singles quarter finalist at the Northern Championships in 1883, an all-comers finalist at the Irish Championships in 1882, and a finalist at the Princes Club Championships in 1882. He was active from 1879 to 1984 and won 5 career singles titles. He won the Irish Championships men's doubles with Ernest Browne in 1882.

== Career ==
The person most likely to have been the early Irish lawn tennis player Peter Aungier was born during the first quarter of 1855 in the English port city of Liverpool. He was the ninth of the ten children of Mark Aungier (1806–70) and Margaret Aungier (née Curtis; 1831–71). He was a member of the Fitzwilliam Lawn Tennis Club, Dublin.

His most notable major achievements came in the men's doubles event at the first Irish Championships in Dublin where he, always with an Irish partner, was runner-up in 1879 with Charles David Barry, 1883 with Ernest Browne, the same year he was a finalist in the mixed doubles with then 16 year old Lena Rice.

In 1882, Peter Aungier and Ernest Browne had won the men's doubles title at the Irish Championships, defeating in the final match the notable English twins William Renshaw and Ernest Renshaw. His won first singles title came in 1881 at the County Kildare Closed Tournament, In 1882 he won the open County Kildare Championship, and would go on to win it a further two times in 1883 and 1884.
