= Portland Park Open =

Defunct tennis tournament
- Founded: 1882; 143 years ago
- Abolished: 1921; 104 years ago
- Location: Portland Park, Newcastle upon Tyne, Northumberland, England
- Venue: Various
- Surface: Grass

The Portland Park Open was an open men's and women's grass court tennis event founded as the Portland Park LTCC Tournament in 1882. The first edition was held at the Portland Park Lawn Tennis and Croquet Club, Newcastle upon Tyne, Northumberland, England and the tournament ran until 1921.

== History ==
The Portland Park LTCC Tournament tennis event was first staged around July 1882 at the Portland Park Lawn Tennis and Croquet Club, Newcastle upon Tyne, Northumberland, England. By the early 1900s the tournament was branded under the name of the Portland Park Open. The tournament was staged until at least 1921 when it was discontinued.
