= County Kildare Open Tennis Championship =

Tennis tournament in Ireland

Tournament information
- Founded: 1881; 144 years ago
- Editions: 140 (2018)
- Location: Naas; Ireland
- Venue: Naas Tennis Club
- Surface: Artificial Grass, outdoors
- Website: http://www.lltc.ie/history/south of ireland championships

Current champions
- Men's singles: (Republic of Ireland) James Halas

The County Kildare Open Tennis Championship, originally known as the County Kildare Tennis Tournament (1879–1880), then County Kildare Championship, is grass court tennis tournament held initially at Naas, County Kildare, in Ireland, established on 2 August 1881.

== History ==
A County Kildare tennis tournament was first staged in 1879 at the Naas military barracks under the title the County Kildare Tournament. and was a It was a featured event of 1879 Men's Tennis tour and 1880 Men's Tennis tour. On 2 August 1880, a Colonel de Burgh called for a meeting of members of the Naas and Country Kildare Cricket club to discuss forming a country club for the purpose of providing archery, cricket, football, lawn tennis, polo, and pigeon shooting for local town residents.

On 1 January 1881 the County Kildare Club was formally established (later changed to Naas Lawn Tennis Club). In August 1881 the County Kildare Open Tennis Championships came into existence. In 1939 the event was won by Irish Davies Cup player George McVeagh. This tournament is still being staged today.

== Champions ==
Notes: Challenge round: The final round of a tournament, in which the winner of a single-elimination phase faces the previous year's champion, who plays only that one match. The challenge round was used in the early history of tennis (from 1877 through 1921) in some tournaments not all.

* Indicates challenger

=== Men's singles ===
Included:

Year	Champions	Runners-up	Score
1879 (Note: 1879 edition held from 27 July to 2 August)	(Ireland) Algernon A. M. Aylmer	(Ireland) James G. Kennedy	4-6, 6-3, 6-2.
1880 (Note: 1880 edition held from 28–31 July)	(Ireland) Joseph R. Rainsford	(Ireland) Jacob R. Sherrard	?
1881 (Note: 1881 edition held from 2–6 August)	(Ireland) Peter Aungier	(Ireland) W.A. Cairnes	?
1882 (Note: 1882 edition held from 25–29 July)	(Ireland) Peter Aungier	(Ireland) John William Young	6–1, 6–4, 6–3
1883 (Note: 1883 edition held from 24 July end date no stated)	(Ireland) Peter Aungier	(Ireland) Algernon A. M. Aylmer	6–0, 6–3, 6–2
1884 (Note: 1884 edition held from 29 July to 2 August)	(Ireland) Peter Aungier	(Ireland) Thomas Harrison Griffiths	6–3, 3–6, 6–4, 2–6, 6–4
1887 (Note: 1887 edition held in July 1887)	(Ireland) Algernon A. M. Aylmer	(Ireland) Cecil J. Cramer-Roberts	6–3, 3–6, 6–3, 6–0
1889 (Note: 1890 edition held in August 1890)	(Ireland) C. Johnson	(Ireland) Richard J. Hornidge	6–2, 6–4, 6–1
1939	(Republic of Ireland) George McVeagh	(Republic of Ireland) George McVeagh	?

== Sources ==
- Abolition of Challenge Rounds". paperspast.natlib.govt.nz. EVENING POST, VOLUME CIII, ISSUE 65, 20 March 1922.
- Gray, John (1880–1881). "Sporting Events". The Freeman's Journal. Dublin, Ireland.
- Irish Times, The. (1887). "Tennis Events" Dublin, Ireland.
- "History – Naas LTC" (2017). Naas LTC. Naas, County Kildare, Ireland: Naas Lawn Tennis Club.
- "Naas Chronology 134 AD – 1900 – Kildare Local History . ie". kildarelocalhistory.i.e. Co. Kildare Federation of Local History Groups. 2017.
- Nieuwland, Alex (2017). "Tournament – County Kildare Tournament". www.tennisarchives.com. Harlingen, Netherlands: Idzznew BV.
- Routledges Sporting Annual (1882) Lawn Tennis in 1881. George Routledge and Son. London.
- Routledges Sporting Annual (1883) Lawn Tennis Principle Meetings of 1882. George Routledge and Son. London.
