= Cirencester Park (cricket ground) =

Cricket ground in Gloucestershire, England

Coordinates: 51.71745°N 1.98443°W

- Interactive map of Cirencester Park

Ground information
- Location: Cirencester, Gloucestershire
- Country: England
- Establishment: 1853 (first recorded match)

Team information
Gloucestershire	(1879)
- As of 11 September 2010; Source: Ground profile

Cirencester Park is a cricket ground in Cirencester, Gloucestershire. The first recorded match on the ground was in 1853, when Cirencester played an All England Eleven.

In 1879, Gloucestershire played a single first-class match at the ground against Surrey, which ended in a draw.

In local domestic cricket, the ground is the home venue of Cirencester Cricket Club.
