= Darlington Open =

Defunct tennis tournament
- Founded: 1881
- Abolished: 1933
- Location: Darlington, County Durham, England
- Venue: Feethams Cricket Ground
- Surface: Grass

The Darlington Open. also known as the Darlington Association Tournament was a late Victorian era men's and women's grass court tennis tournament founded in 1881. It was organised by the Darlington Outdoor's Sports Association and held at the Feethams Cricket Ground Darlington, County Durham, England. The tournament ran annually until 1933.

== History ==
Darlington Open Tournament was founded in 1881 by the Darlington Outdoor's Sports Association, and held at the Feethams Cricket Ground Darlington, County Durham, England until 1893. The inaugural was held from 1 August to 6 August 1881. The winner of the men's singles was Mr. Mark Fenwick who defeated Mr. Arthur Richard Springett. The women's singles was won by Miss Ethel Surtees who defeated Miss Alice Cheese.

A local newspaper report of the event that concluded on early August 1882:

“A great and fashionable assembly” witnessed Mr. Hallward beat Mr. Minden Fenwick in the Gentlemen’s Single Handed Final. Miss Smith beat Miss Turner to the ladies’ title, and the Gentlemen’s and Ladies’ Double Handed competition was won by Mr. J.W. Fowler and Miss. E Cheese.

— Lawn Tennis, The Northern Echo (August 1882).

The final edition concluded on 12 August 1893 the winner of men's singles was Mr. Harold Mahony and the winner of the women's singles was Miss Charlotte Cooper.

Other notable winners of this title in the men's singles include Herbert William Wrangham Wilberforce (1883, 1887, 1888) and Patrick Bowes-Lyon (1884–1886). Whilst former women's singles winners included Helen Jackson (1887) and Lottie Dod (1888). Of note the ladies singles tournament was not played at every edition. The tournament ran annually until 1933 when it was dropped by the County Durham Lawn Tennis Association along with the following Norton Open and Ryton Open.

== Finals ==
Challenge Round: the final round of a tournament, in which the winner of a single-elimination phase faces the previous year's champion, who plays only that one match. The challenge round was used in the early history of tennis (from 1877 through 1921), in some tournaments not all.

* Indicates challenger

=== Men's Singles ===
Year	Winner	Runner-up	Score
1881.	(United Kingdom) Mark Fenwick	(United Kingdom) G. H. Evans	6–0, 4–6, 6–2
1882.	(England) Arthur Hallward *	(United Kingdom) Minden Fenwick	6–1, 4–6, 6–1, 6–3
1883.	(England) Herbert Wilberforce *	(England) Arthur Hallward	6-2, 6-1, 6-1
1884.	(Scotland) Patrick Bowes-Lyon *	(England) Herbert Wilberforce	7-9, 6-2, 6-1, ret.
1885.	(Scotland) Patrick Bowes-Lyon (2)	(England) Kenneth Ramsden Marley *	6–0, 6–1, 6–3
1886.	(Scotland) Patrick Bowes-Lyon (3)	(United Kingdom) Arthur Godfrey Pease *	?
1887.	(England) Herbert Wilberforce (2)	(Scotland) John Galbraith Horn	6–0, 6–0, 6–1
1888.	(England) Herbert Wilberforce (3)	(Scotland) Herbert Bowes-Lyon *	6–2, 6–2, ret.
1889.	(England) Frank Noon	(England) George Richmond Mewburn	6-4, 7-5, 6-2
1890.	(England) Frank Noon (2)	(United Kingdom) Henry Johnston Carson	3–6, 6–3, 3–6, 6–4, 6–1
1891.	(Ireland) George Ball-Greene	(United Kingdom) Harold Weston Carlton	6–4, 6–3, 1–6, 6–2
1892.	(Ireland) Grainger Chaytor *	(Ireland) George Ball-Greene	7–5, 6–3, 7–5
1893.	(Ireland) Harold Mahony *	(Ireland) Grainger Chaytor	w.o.

=== Men's Doubles ===
Year	Winner	Runner-up	Score
1881.	(United Kingdom) Mark Fenwick (United Kingdom) Minden Fenwick	(United Kingdom) Mr. Long (England) George E. Newby	5–6, 6–1, 6–3

=== Women's Single's ===
Year	Winner	Runner-up	Score
1881.	(England) Miss. Ethel Surtees	(England) Miss. Alice Cheese	3–6, 6–3, 6–1
1882.	(England) Constance Smith	(United Kingdom) Anthea Turner	6–3, 6–0
1893.	(England) Charlotte Cooper	(England) Miss. Shaw	6–0, 6–1

=== Women's Doubles ===
Year	Winner	Runner-up	Score
1881.	(England) Miss. A, Stobart (England) Miss. E. Hunt	(United Kingdom) Miss. Bell (England) Miss. F. Lightfoot	won

=== Mixed Doubles ===
Year	Winner	Runner-up	Score
1881.	(England) Sir James Blackhouse Dale (England) Miss. Alice Cheese	(United Kingdom) Percival Clennell Fenwick (United Kingdom) Miss. Winnifred Fenwick	9–7, 6–3
1882.	(England) J.W. Fowler (England) Miss. E. Cheese	(United Kingdom) Percival Clennell Fenwick (United Kingdom) Miss. Winnifred Fenwick	7–5, 8–6
1893.	(Ireland) Harold Mahony (England) Miss. Charlotte Cooper	(England) Henry Gervas Stobart (England) Miss. Shaw	6–1, 6–4

== Notes ==
The Minden family were closely associated with this tournament, who within a couple of years had emigrated to New Zealand. Percival Clennell Fenwick won the inaugural New Zealand Lawn Tennis Championships in 1886 and again in 1887, 1888. His brother Minden Fenwick won the title in 1889–1890.

== Sources ==
- McLintock, Alexander Hare; McLintock, Alexander Hare; Taonga, New Zealand Ministry for Culture and Heritage Te Manatu. "New Zealand Championships". An encyclopaedia of New Zealand, edited by A. H. McLintock, 1966. Ministry of Culture and Heritage.
- Routledges Sporting Annual (1882) George Routledge and Son. London.
- Routledges Sporting Annual (1883) George Routledge and Son. London.
- The Northern Echo (2008) Darlington, County Durham, England.
