= Wood court =

Type of tennis court

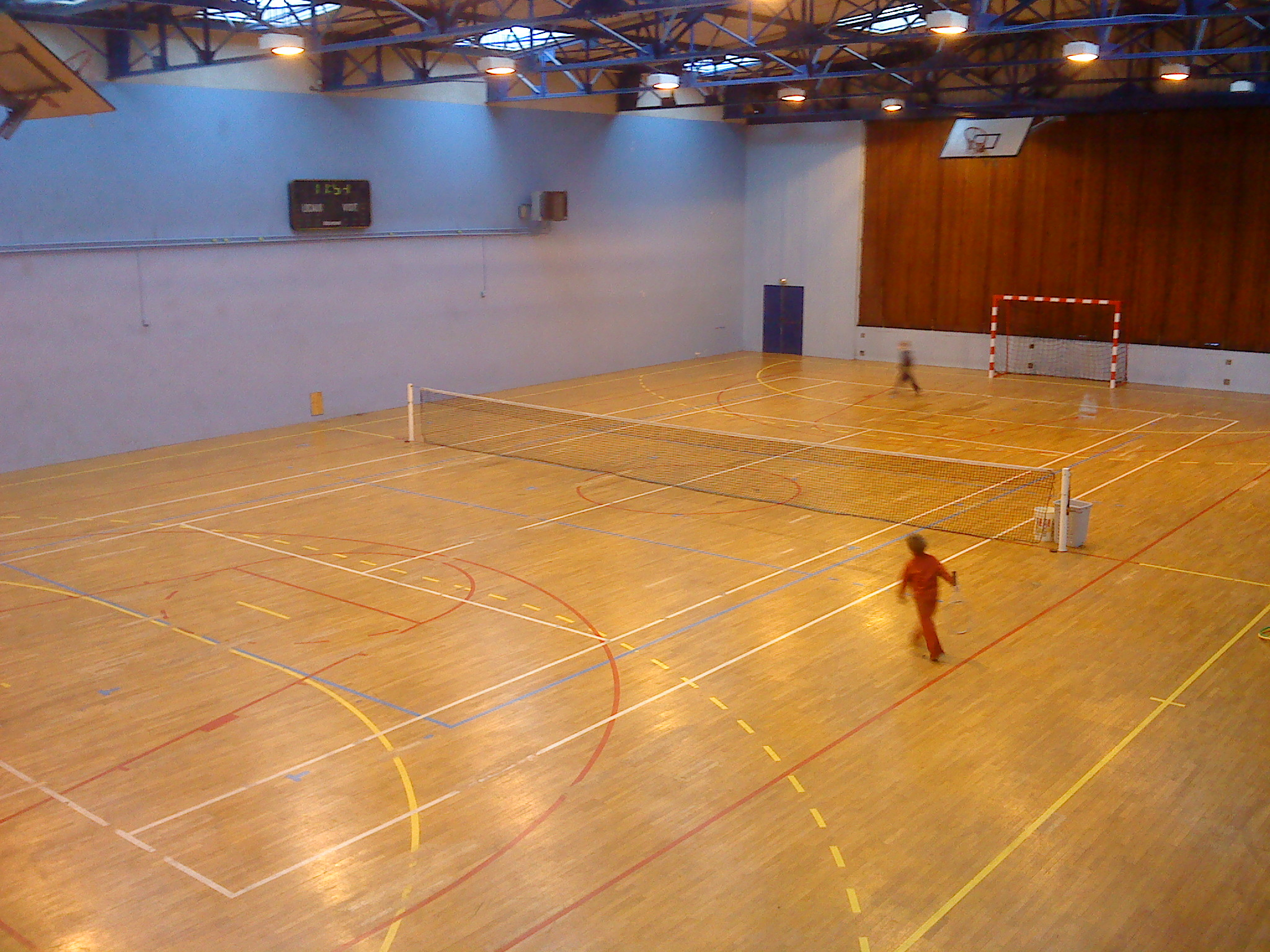
An indoor wood tennis court.

A wood court is one of the types of tennis courts on which the modern sport of tennis, originally known as "lawn tennis", is played. Wood courts are generally a form of hardwood flooring. These courts were once used for indoor "covered court" tennis tournaments beginning in the late 19th century through to the early 1970s, and occasionally were used to stage outdoor tennis tournaments. They were largely supplanted by the development of indoor carpet courts in professional play, which were later also supplanted by the development of indoor hard courts.

== History ==
The surface was first introduced in competitive tournaments in 1878 at the Scottish Championships in Edinburgh, which was held on indoor wood courts until 1883. They were also used from 1881 in England at the Cheltenham Covered Court Championships and Gore Court Championships, both indoor events. In 1885 the Seventh Regiment Championship was established and played on indoor wood courts at the Seventh Regiment Armory in New York City.

Wooden tennis courts are the fastest type of indoor tennis court as they have a very short and low bounce. The player's speed is the tactical deciding advantage on wood courts. Wooden surface courts were better suited to players with good reflexes. Additionally, wood courts are more forgiving compared to concrete or asphalt courts as wood tennis courts are not as hard on the players' feet or the tennis ball itself.

== Players ==
A wood court specialist is a tennis player who excels on wood courts, usually more than on any other surface, but not always. Pre-open era players played on multiple surfaces, including wood courts.

Male tennis players who were particularly successful on this surface (titles won in parentheses) include; French player Jean Borotra (23), Australian players Ken Rosewall (20), and Rod Laver (18), American player Bill Tilden II (15), British players George Caridia (9), Laurence Doherty (8), Ernest Wool Lewis (7), New Zealander Anthony Wilding (7), Frenchman Andre Gobert (5), Czech–Egyptian player Jaroslav Drobny (4) and British player Bobby Wilson (8)

== Notable tournaments ==
- Bavarian International Covered Court Championships
- Berlin International Covered Courts
- British Covered Court Championships
- Canadian Covered Court Championships
- Cheltenham Covered Court Championships
- Eastern Indoor Championships
- French Covered Court Championships
- German International Covered Court Championships
- London Covered Court Championships
- Lyon Covered Court Championships (from 1948 called Coupe Georges Cozon)
- New England Indoor Championships
- Queen's Club Covered Court Championship
- Seventh Regiment Championship
- Scottish Championships
- Scandinavian Indoor Championships
- Swedish International Covered Courts Championships
- USSR International Covered Court Championships
- Welsh Covered Court Championships
- World Covered Court Championships

== See also ==
- Clay court
- Grass court
