= Ernest Browne =

Irish tennis player (1855–1946)

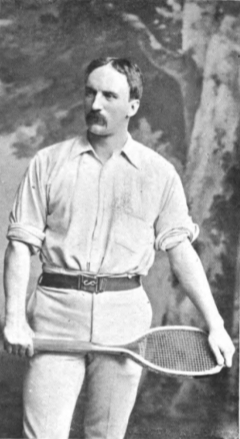
- Browne (before 1903)
- Full name: Ernest de Sylly Hamilton Browne
- Country (sports): Ireland
- Born: 11 July 1855 Great Malvern, England
- Died: 13 April 1946 (aged 90) Cheltenham, England

Singles
- Career record: 124–30
- Career titles: 25

Grand Slam singles results
- Wimbledon: SF (1885)

Ernest de Sylly Hamilton Browne (11 July 1855 – 13 April 1946; also E. de S. H. Browne) was an Irish tennis player who was active in the late 19th century.

== Career ==
Browne played his first tournament in April at 1880 at a tournament staged in Cheltenham on clay he reached the final before losing to Ernest Renshaw. In late May 1880 he entered the Irish Lawn Tennis Championships and reached the All-Comers final losing to William Renshaw in straight sets. In 1881 he entered three tournaments this year including the South of England Championships losing in the 1st round. At Irish Championships he lost a second match against Herbert Lawford retiring at two sets to one down. He reached his second successive Cheltenham final in 1881 before losing to William Renshaw. Browne took part in the Wimbledon Championships between 1882 and 1885. In 1885 he reached the semifinals of the all-comers-competition, but lost to Ernest Renshaw. He won the Irish Championships in doubles (1882) and mixed doubles (1882, 1883) the Scottish Championships singles title consecutively three times from (1889–91). and the Welsh Championships singles title twice (1886–87). In addition he won three consecutive West of England Championships, (1883,84,85) titles at Bath and the Cheltenham tournament singles title four times, (1881, 1885–87). Browne was a friend and mentor of Ernest and William Renshaw. He played his last tournament at the 1892 Scottish Championships where he was defending in the challenge round against challenger Arthur Gore he conceded the title by a walkover.

== Personal ==
Ernest was born in 1855 in England. He married Ellen Augusta Ramsay the daughter of Sir Alexander Ramsay in Kensington London in December 1885. After his retirement he resided in Tullamore, King's County, Ireland. He spent his final years in England and died in Cheltenham England in 1946 at the age of 90.

== Career finals ==
Notes: Challenge Round: the final round of a tournament, in which the winner of a single-elimination phase faces the previous year's champion, who plays only that one match. The challenge round was used in the early history of tennis (from 1877 through 1921), in some tournaments not all.

* Indicates challenge round

=== Singles: 34 (25 titles, 9 runner-up) ===
Category + (Titles)
Important (0). .
National (5)
Regional (7)
County (7)
Regular (4)

Titles by Surface
Clay – Outdoor (0)
Grass – Outdoor (23)
Hard – Outdoor (0)
Carpet – Indoor (0)
Wood – Indoor (0)

No.	Result	Date	Tournament	Surface	Opponent	Score
1.	Win	1880	County Galway LTC Tournament	Grass	(Ireland) J. Eyre	?
2.	Loss	1880	Irish Championships	Grass	(England) William Renshaw	6-3, 6-4, 6-3
3.	Loss	1881	Cheltenham Covered Court Championships	Wood (i)	(England) Ernest Renshaw	6-2, 3-6, 6-1, 8-6
4.	Win	1881	East Gloucestershire Championships	Grass	(United Kingdom) Robert Braddell	6-3, 6-3, 3-6, 6-0
5.	Loss	1882	Agricultural Hall Tournament	Wood (i)	(United Kingdom) Teddy Williams	5-7, 6-4, 10-8
6.	Win	1883	South of Ireland Championships	Grass	(Ireland) William E. Dawson	6-3, 6-2, 6-5
7.	Win	1883	West of England Championships	Grass	(England) Wilfred Milne	6-3, 6-2, 6-3
8.	Win	1884	Fitzwilliam Club Championships	Grass	(Ireland) ?	?
9.	Win	1884	King’s County and Ormonde Tournament	Grass	(Ireland) Eyre Chatterton	w.o.
10.	Win	1884	North Yorkshire Tournament	Grass	(United Kingdom) Marmaduke Constable	6-1, ret.
11.	Loss	1884	Derbyshire Championships	Grass	(United Kingdom) Charles Walder Grinstead	5-7, 6-2, 6-2, 5-7, 6-4
12.	Loss	1884	Northern Championships	Grass	(United Kingdom) C.K. Wood	6-4, 6-2, 6-4
13.	Win	1884	West of England Championships	Grass	(United Kingdom) C.K. Wood	6-3, 6-2, 6-3
14.	Loss	1885	Fitzwilliam Club Championships	Grass	(United Kingdom) Herbert Knox McKay	3 sets to 1
15.	Win	1885	King’s County and Ormonde Tournament	Grass	(Ireland) Toler Garvey	6-4, 6-4, 4-6, 8-6
16.	Win	1885	North Yorkshire Tournament	Grass	(United Kingdom) E.W. Fletcher	6-2, 6-2, 6-4
17.	Win	1885	West of England Championships	Grass	(United States) James Dwight	6-3, 6-1, 6-4
18.	Win	1885	East Gloucestershire Championships	Grass	(United Kingdom) Charles Hoadley Ashe Ross	6-4, 6-3, 6-2
19.	Win	1886	Harrogate Tournament	Grass	(United Kingdom) Gilbert Mahon	3-6, 4-6, 6-4, 6-4, 6-4
20.	Win	1886	West of England Championships	Grass	(United Kingdom) James Baldwin	6-0, ret.
21.	Win	1886	Welsh Championships	Grass	(United Kingdom) James Baldwin	6-0, ret.
22.	Win	1886	North of England Championships	Grass	(United Kingdom) Harry Grove	6-3, 4-6, 6-3, 2-6, 6-2
23.	Win	1886	East Gloucestershire Championships	Grass	(United States) James Dwight	6-3, 6-2, 2-6, 9-7
24.	Win	1887	Welsh Championships	Grass	(United Kingdom) James Baldwin	6-1, 6-2, ret.
25.	Win	1887	North of England Championships	Grass	(United Kingdom) James Baldwin	7-5, 6-1, 6-3
26.	Win	1887	East Gloucestershire Championships	Grass	(United States) James Dwight	3-6, 6-3, 6-1, 4-6, 6-2
27.	Loss	1888	Welsh Championships	Grass	(Ireland) Willoughby Hamilton	6-1, 6-2, ret.
28.	Loss	1888	East Gloucestershire Championships	Grass	(United Kingdom) Harry Grove	7-5, 6-3, 4-6, 2-6, ret.
29.	Win	1889	Scottish Championships	Grass	(Scotland) Patrick Bowes-Lyon	4-6, 7-5, 6-1, 6-0
30.	Win	1890	Scottish Championships	Grass	(Scotland) George R. Mewburn	6-3, 3-6, 6-1, 6-4
31.	Win	1891	Scottish Championships	Grass	(Australia) Arthur Benjamin Carvosso	6-3, 6-3, 6-1
32.	Loss	1892	Scottish Championships	Grass	(United Kingdom) Athur Gore	w.o.

== Sources ==
- Collins, Bud (2010). The Bud Collins History of Tennis: An Authoritative Encyclopedia and Record Book (2 ed.). New Chapter Press. ISBN 9780942257700.
- Myers, Arthur Wallis (1903): Lawn Tennis at Home and Abroad. Charles Scribner's and Sons, New York, US.
