= Rainthorpe Hall Open =

Defunct tennis tournament
- Founded: 1884; 142 years ago
- Abolished: 1885; 141 years ago
- Location: Tasburgh, Norfolk, England
- Venue: Rainthorpe Hall
- Surface: Grass

The Rainthorpe Hall Open was a Victorian era men's and women's grass court tennis tournament. It was first staged in 1884. The tournament was played at Rainthorpe Hall, Tasburgh, Norfolk, England until 1885.

== History ==
Rainthorpe Hall is a 16th-century country mansion near Tasburgh, Norfolk, England, it is located 8 miles (13 km) south of Norwich. The hall's land cover 18.7 acres. In August 1884 Sir Charles Harvey, 2nd Baronet (1849–1928) the owner of the property allowed the staging of the first Rainthorpe Open Lawn Tennis Tournament. The tournament ran for just two editions before it was discontinued.

== Finals ==
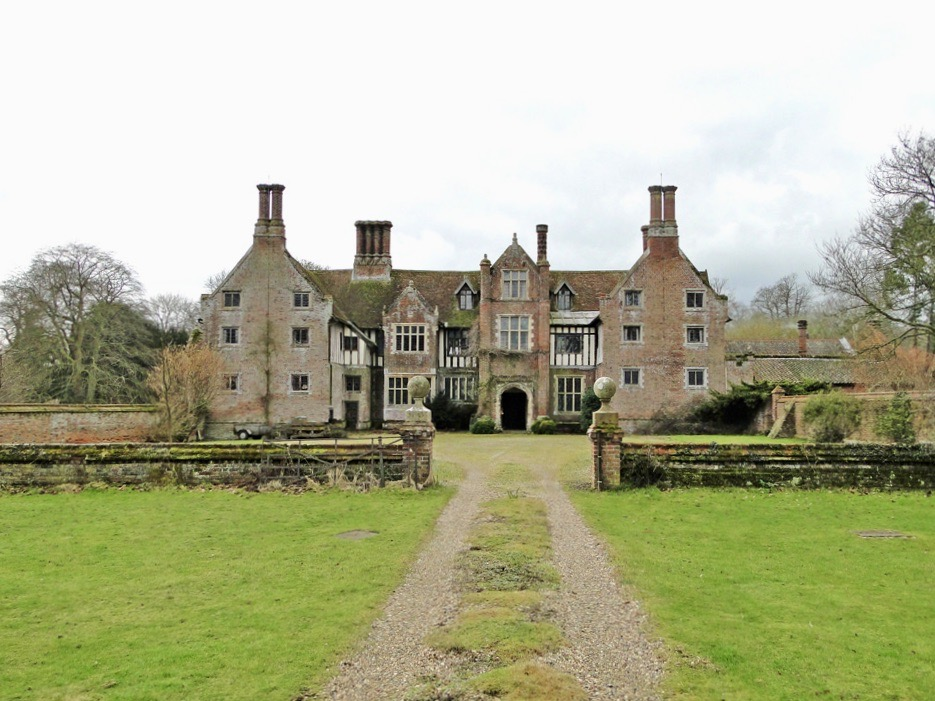
Rainthorpe Hall, the venue for this tournament

=== Men's Singles ===
Year	Winner	Finalist	Score
1884	(England) Edward Kelso Lennox Lawson	(England) Francis William Monement	6-5, 4–6, 4–6, 6–2, 6–2.
1885	(England) Francis William Monement	(England) William Bolding Monement	2-6, 6–3, 6–3, 6–4.

=== Men's Doubles ===
Year	Winner	Finalist	Score
1885	(England) Francis William Monement (England) William Bolding Monement	(United Kingdom of Great Britain and Ireland) Arthur Lloyd Hansell (United Kingdom of Great Britain and Ireland) M. Dewing	6-1, 6–4, 6–1.

=== Mixed Doubles ===
Year	Winner	Finalist	Score
1885	(England) William Bolding Monement (England) Miss Marriott	(England) Francis William Monement (England) Miss Farmar	3-6, 5–6, 6–3, 6–3, 6–4.

== See also ==
- Tasburgh
