= William Bolding Monement =

- Country (sports): GBR
- Born: 30 March 1847; King's Lynn, Norfolk, England
- Died: September 1925; Erpingham, Norfolk, England
- Turned pro: 1880 (amateur tour)
- Retired: 1892

Singles
- Career record: 42–12
- Career titles: 3

Grand Slam singles results
- Wimbledon: 2R (1880)

William Bolding Monement (30 March 1847 – September 1925) was an English tennis player from Norfolk active in the late 19th century. He was a competitor at the 1880 Wimbledon Championship where he was defeated in the second round by eventual finalist Herbert Fortescue Lawford.

== Career ==
Monement played his first tournament at the 1880 Wimbledon Championship losing to Herbert Lawnford in straight sets in the second round. In 1882 he won his first title at the Holt LTC Tournament against his brother Francis William Monement. The same year he competed at the Prince's Club Championships at Hans Place, London where he lost to Ireland's Ernest Browne, he then won his second singles title at the Norwich Open against Edward Morgan Hansell.

In 1883 he failed to defend his Norwich Open title losing in the challenge round to his brother. The same year he competed at the Leicester Lawn Tennis Club Tournament. but exited early in defeat to Charles Walder Grinstead. In 1885 he reached the final of the Rainthorpe Hall Open tournament, but again lost to his brother. In 1892 he played and won his final tournament and title at Baron's Hall, Fakenham, Norfolk.

== Personal life ==
William Bolding Monement was a landowner from King's Lynne in Norfolk, England. In 1899 he inherited the Weybourne Estate from his uncle William Johnson Jennis Bolding a landowner, artist and noted photographer. In 1925 when he died the estate passed to his brother Francis William Monement.
