= Holt Lawn Tennis Club Tournament =

Defunct tennis tournament
- Founded: 1880; 145 years ago
- Abolished: 1884; 141 years ago
- Editions: 4
- Location: Holt, Norfolk, England
- Venue: Holt Lawn Tennis Club
- Surface: Grass

The Holt Lawn Tennis Club Tournament was a men's and women's grass court tennis tournament founded in August 1880 at Holt LTC, Holt, Norfolk, England. The event ran annually until 1884.

== History ==
The Holt Lawn Tennis Club Tournament was a late 19th century grass court tennis tournament held for the first time in August 1880 at the Holt Lawn Tennis Club (f.1879), on the grounds of the Greshams School (f.1555), Holt, Norfolk, England. The first winner of the men's singles was England's William Meaburn Tatham. In August 1882 a women's singles event was played and won by a Miss A. Partridge who defeated a Miss A. Foster. The final winner of the gentleman's singles was William Bolding Monement. The tournament ran until 1884 only and was discontinued.

== Finals ==
(Incomplete Roll)

=== Men's Singles ===
Year	Winner	Runner-up	Score
1881	(England) William Meaburn Tatham	(United Kingdom) William Bolding Monement	2 sets to 1.
1882	(United Kingdom) William Bolding Monement	(United Kingdom) Francis William Monement	6–5, 6–2.
1883	(England) Charles Edmund Tatham	(United Kingdom) William Bolding Monement	6–1, 2–6, 6–1.
1884	(United Kingdom) William Bolding Monement	(England) Edward Berners Upcher	6–1, 6–0.

=== Women's Singles ===
Year	Winner	Runner-up	Score
1882	(England) Miss A. Partridge	(England) Miss A. Foster	2–0 sets, 4–2,4–2.

=== Men's doubles ===
(Incomplete roll)

Year	Winner	Runner-up	Score
1883	(United Kingdom) Francis William Monement (United Kingdom) William Bolding Monement	(United Kingdom) William Henry Rawlinson (United Kingdom) H.C. Marsh	2 sets to 0.
