= Tudor architecture =

Architectural style

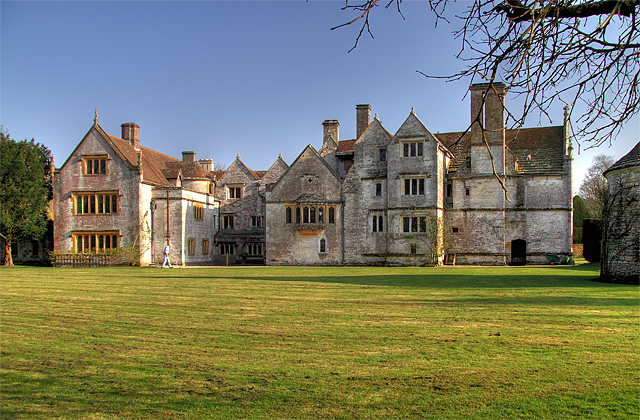
Athelhampton House - built 1493–1550, early in the period

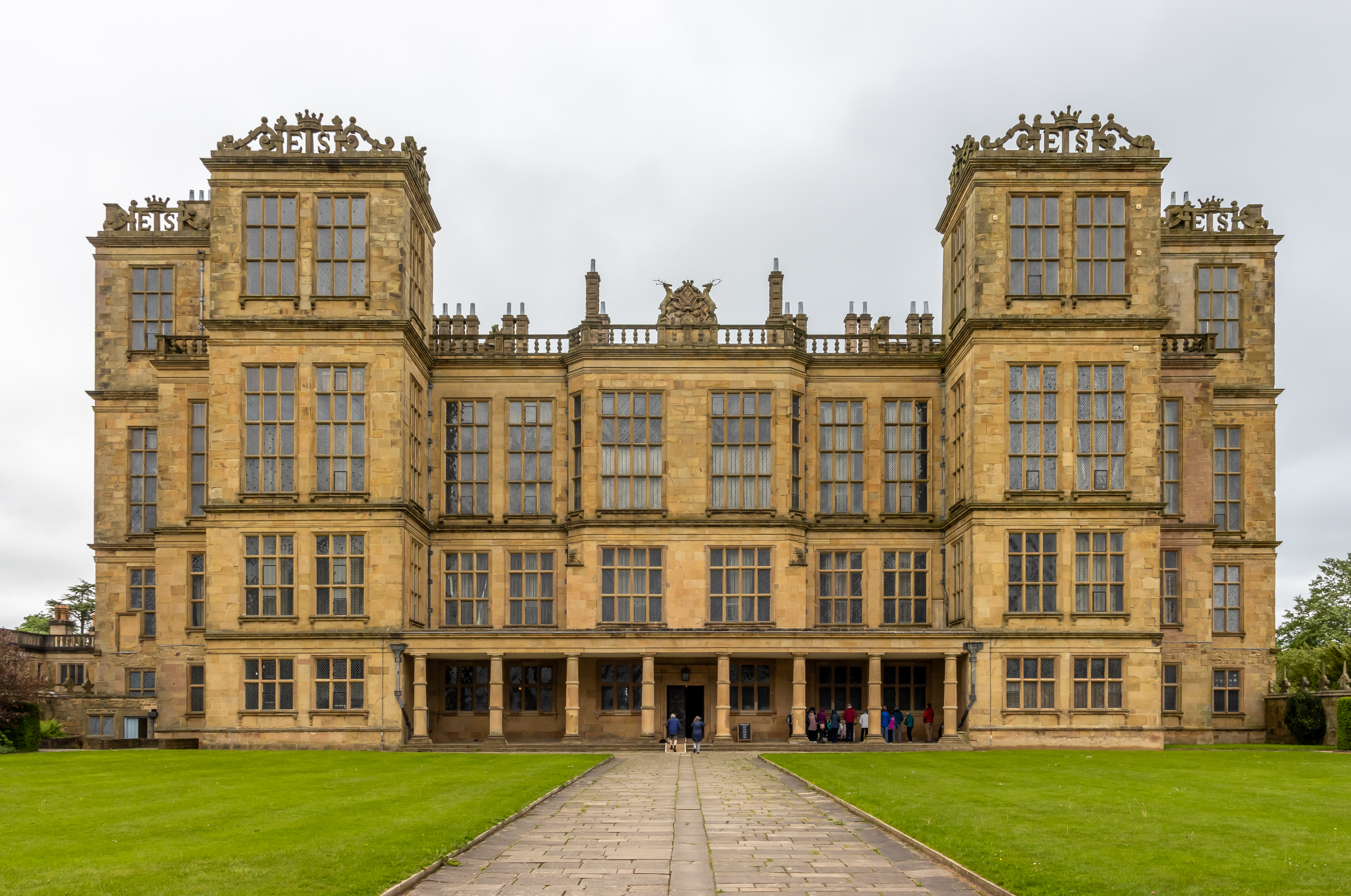
Hardwick Hall, an Elizabethan prodigy house

The Tudor architectural style is the term for English architecture in the Tudor period (1485–1603). This was a time of architectural transition, as the Gothic Perpendicular style was gradually replaced by a Renaissance aesthetic derived from Italy via France and the Low Countries. Coupled with the change from Gothic to Renaissance forms was a shift from religious to secular architecture, due to the impact of the English Reformation. A subtype of Tudor architecture is Elizabethan architecture, from about 1560 to 1600, which has continuity with the subsequent Jacobean architecture in the early Stuart period.

The low pointed Tudor arch was another defining feature. Some of the most remarkable oriel windows belong to this period. Mouldings are more spread out and the foliage becomes more naturalistic. During the reigns of Henry VIII and Edward VI, many Italian artists arrived in England; their decorative features can be seen at Hampton Court Palace, Layer Marney Tower, Sutton Place, and elsewhere. However, in the following reign of Elizabeth I, the influence of Northern Mannerism, mainly derived from pattern books, was greater. Courtiers and other wealthy Elizabethans competed to build prodigy houses that proclaimed their status and would be able to host the queen on her annual progresses around the country.

The Dissolution of the Monasteries redistributed large amounts of land to the wealthy, resulting in a secular building boom, as well as a source of stone. The building of churches had already slowed somewhat before the English Reformation, after a great boom in the previous century, but was brought to a near-complete stop by the Reformation. Civic and university buildings became steadily more numerous in the period. Brick was something of an exotic and expensive rarity at the beginning of the period, but during it became very widely used in many parts of England, gradually restricting traditional methods such as timber framing to vernacular architecture.

== Location ==
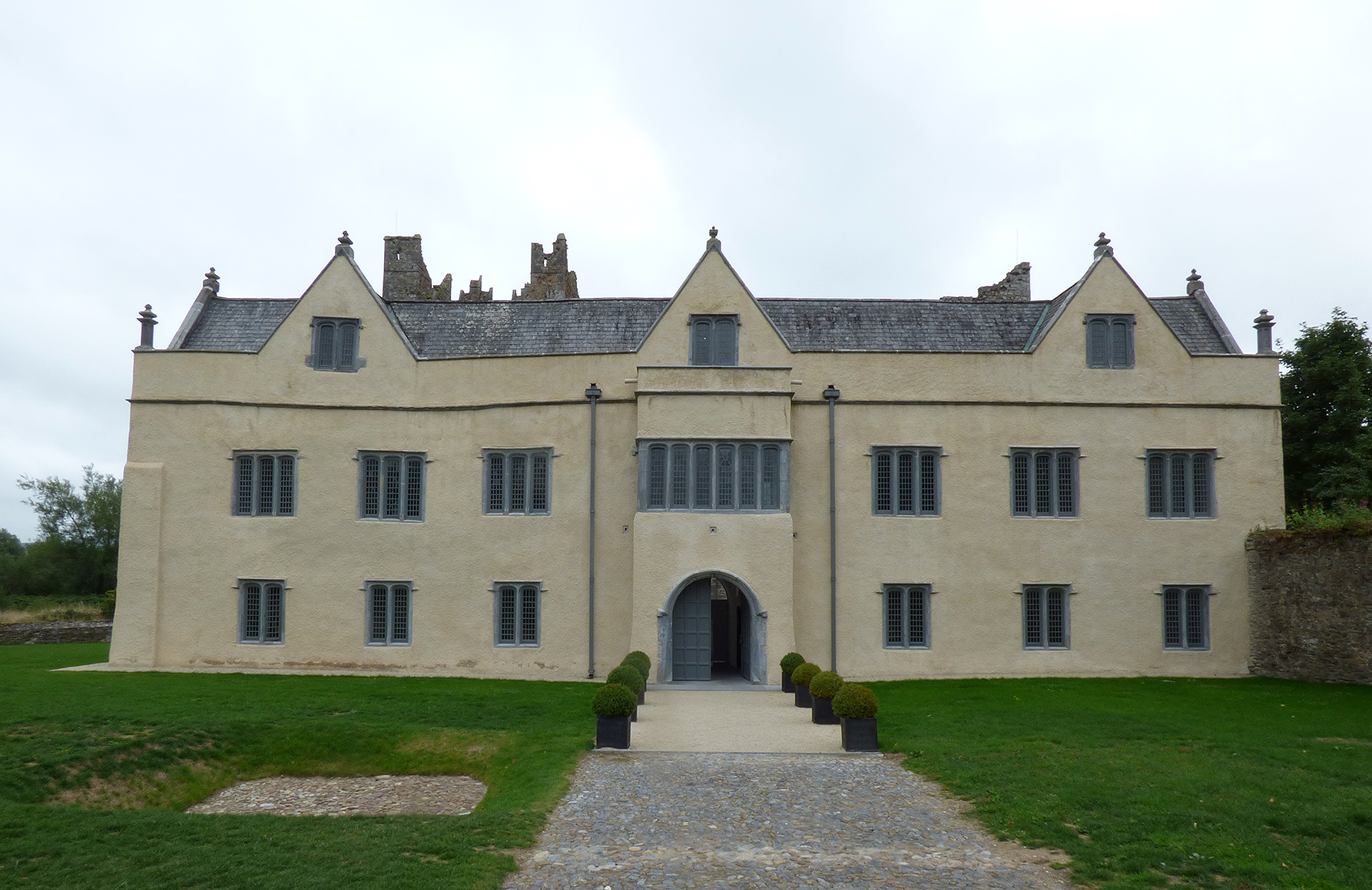
Ormonde Castle, Carrick-on-Suir, Co. Tipperary

Although Tudor architecture is an English style, it can be found in areas which are not now part of England. Wales had been conquered by Edward I in 1277–83, and was legally unified with England by Henry VIII with the Laws in Wales Acts 1535 and 1542. As such, its architectural history was one with that of England in the Tudor period, and Tudor churches and houses of all scales can be found, such as Wrexham St Giles', Raglan Castle and Plas Mawr, Conwy. Tudor architecture can also be found in overseas areas then under English control, namely Ireland and the English exclave of Calais (until it was reconquered by the French in 1558). Calais was virtually destroyed by bombing in World War Two, but buildings such as the Staple Inn (where Anne Boleyn and her ladies danced before the English and French courts in 1532) are known two have combined four-centred arches with Flemish features. Ormonde Castle (1565) is a notable example of Irish Tudor architecture. As England was frequently at war with Scotland, Scottish patrons unsurprisingly looked elsewhere for inspiration, and Scottish Renaissance architecture owes a great deal to France and nothing to England. Though English forces frequently occupied large parts of southern Scotland (for example during the Rough Wooing of 1544), they did not settle and so did not influence the local architecture.

== Development ==
=== Henry VII (1485–1509) ===
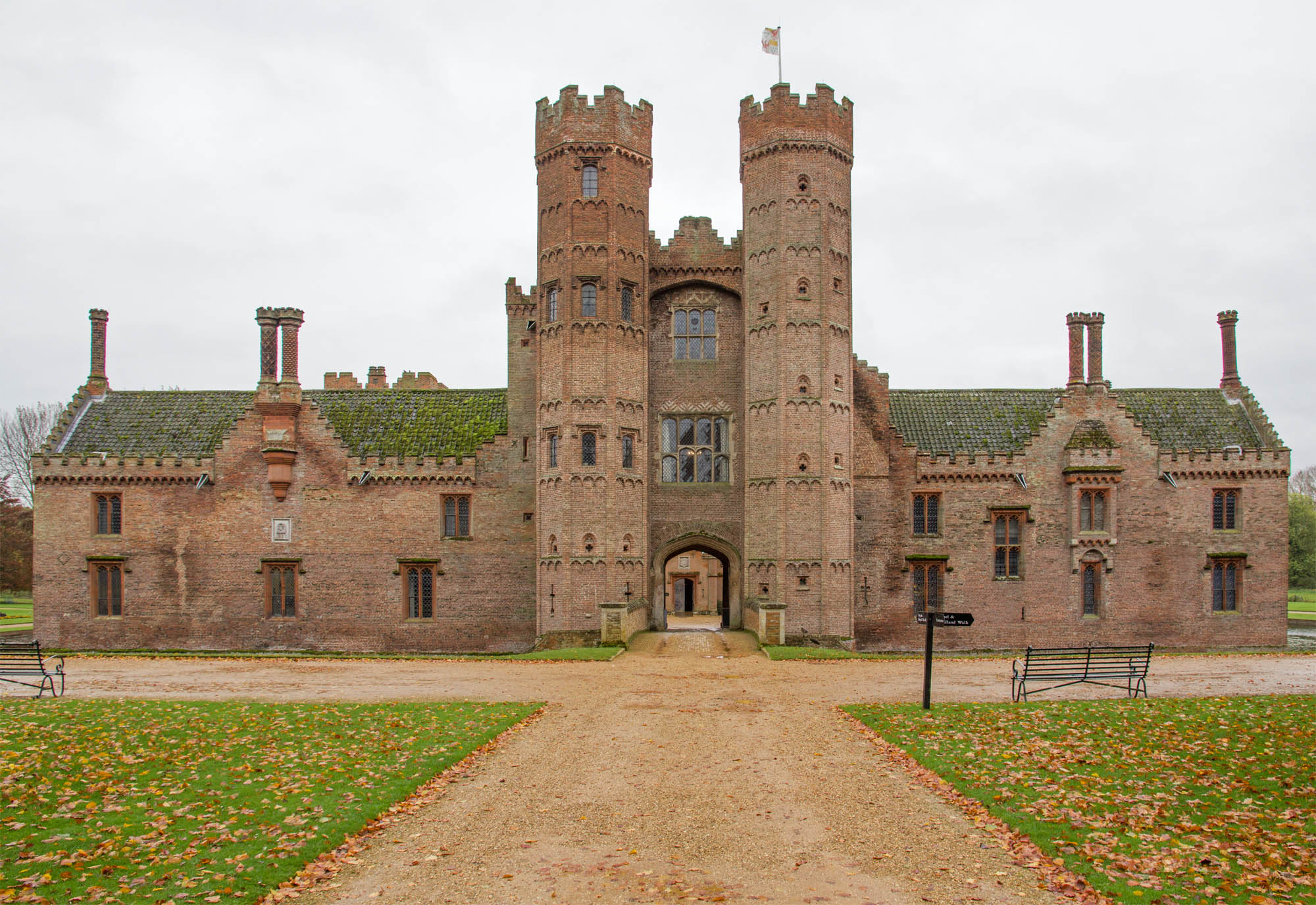
The gatehouse of Oxburgh Hall, Norfolk

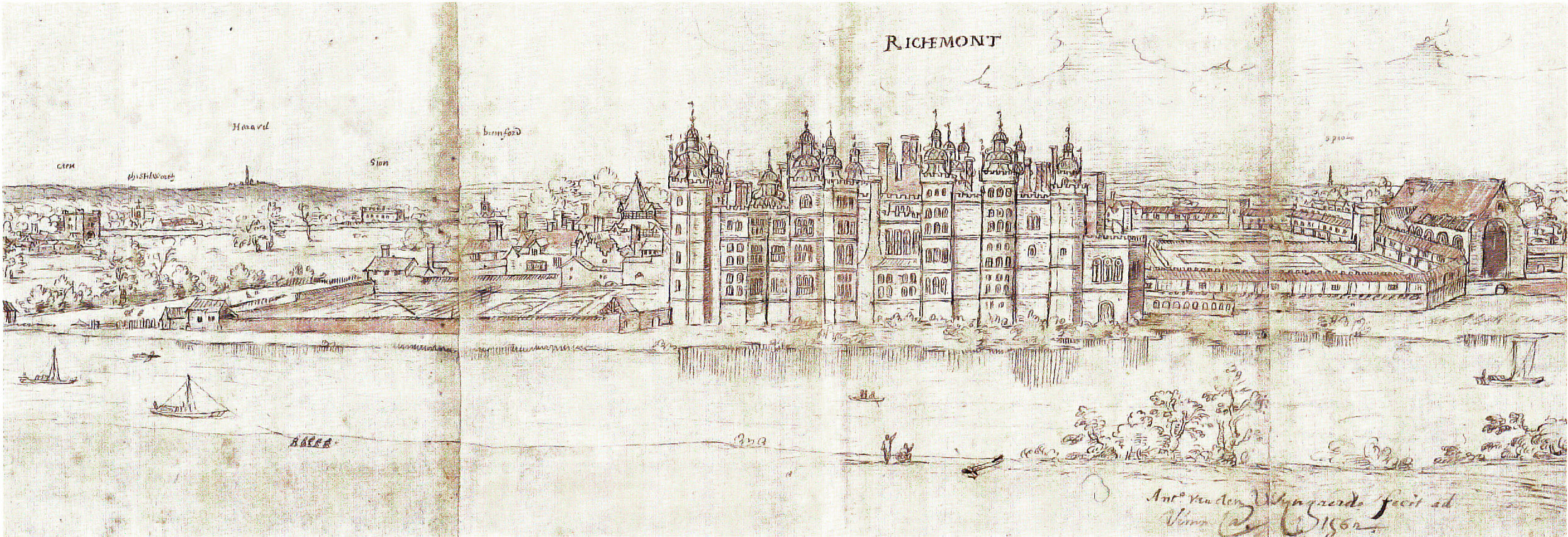
Richmond Palace, west front, drawn by Antony Wyngaerde in 1562

The residences of the king and nobility, while they had not been seriously defensible for centuries, still evoked the idea of the castle, with moats, gatehouses, machicolations and crenellations. Brick, having been popularised in 15th century buildings like Tattershall Castle and Herstmonceaux Castle, was now in general use as a secular building material across eastern England. The ascendancy of the Tudors caused no direct change in architectural style, with buildings such as Hadleigh Deanery (Suffolk, 1470s) and Giffords Hall (also Suffolk, 1510s) looking much alike.

In the early part of his reign, Henry Tudor favoured two palaces on the Thames: Greenwich (also known as Placentia) and Richmond. Although today the Old Royal Naval College sits on the site of Greenwich, evidence suggests that, shortly after ascending the throne, Henry spent a very large amount of money on enlarging it and finishing off a watchtower built prior to his reign; his Queen, Elizabeth, gave birth to Henry VIII and his brother Edmund in this palace. Henry Tudor's palace facing the Thames Estuary had a brick courtyard that faced the River Thames. Excavation has also revealed that it had a chapel with black-and-white tiles, and 'bee boles' in which bees could hibernate. As well as Greenwich, Henry VII rebuilt Richmond Palace, after its timber predecessor of Sheen burnt to the ground at Christmas 1497. This has been described as the first prodigy house, a term for the ostentatious mansions of Elizabeth's courtiers and others, and was influential on other great houses for decades to come as well as a seat of royal power and pageantry.

=== Henry VIII and the early Renaissance (1509–1558) ===
Henry VII was succeeded by his second son, Henry VIII, who spent enormous amounts of money on building many palaces, as well as other expensive forms of display. In a courtyard of Hampton Court Palace he installed a fountain that for celebrations flowed with wine. He also built military installations all along the southern coast of England and the border with Scotland.

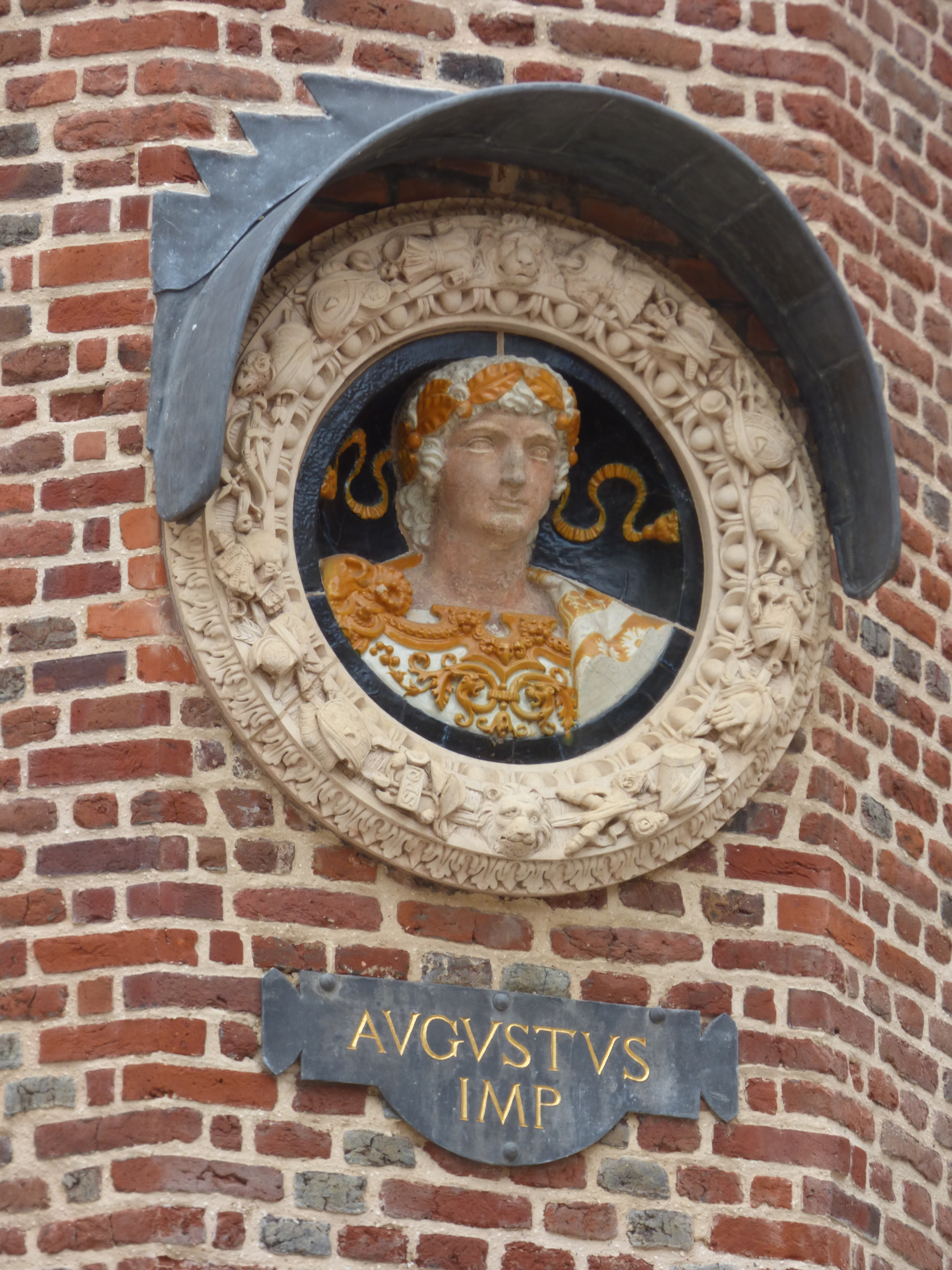
Terracotta roundel of Augustus on Hampton Court Palace

Renaissance forms were most probably introduced to England in the reign of Henry VIII, initially only as minor ornaments to Gothic buildings, such as the tomb of Henry VII in Westminster Abbey (1512-18) and the roundels decorating Hampton Court Palace. These first Renaissance works were done by Italians, like Pietro Torrigiani, a Florentine contemporary of Michelangelo, who made Henry VII's tomb. However, royal patronage made the new forms popular among the nobility (including the episcopacy), and English craftsmen soon turned their hands to Renaissance ornament, whether learnt from immigrant artists or from books. One such was John Lee, who designed John Fisher's chantry in St John's College, Cambridge in a Gothic style, but made the tomb (destroyed in 1733 and only known from an illustration) Renaissance. This work was done in 1524, and may be the earliest Renaissance work that can be firmly attributed to an English designer. John Lee continued to combine Gothic and Renaissance features in the West Chantry at Ely Cathedral (c.1520s) - at this time, designers did not see Gothic and Renaissance as fundamentally opposed, but as sources of detail that could be blended to create a rich and exotic architecture.

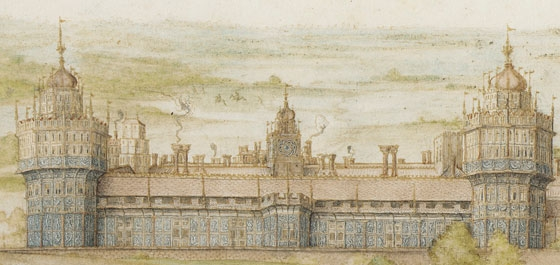
Detail of Georg Hoefnagel's 1568 watercolour of the south front of Nonsuch Palace.

Henry VIII's most ambitious palace was Nonsuch Palace, south of London and now disappeared, an attempt to rival the spectacular French royal palaces of the age and, like them, using imported Italian artists, though the architecture is northern European in inspiration. Much of the Tudor palace survives at Hampton Court Palace, which Henry took over from his disgraced minister Cardinal Wolsey and expanded, and this is now the surviving Tudor royal palace that best shows the style.

Over time, inward-looking quadrangular house plans were replaced by more open H- or E-shaped plans. The new planning can be seen at Sutton Place (c.1525), where the house is externally symmetrical, so that its internal layout cannot be immediately read like that of a medieval house. More common than innovative planning, however, was the application of Italian-style terracotta decoration to otherwise traditional buildings, such as the gatehouse of Layer Marney Tower (c.1523). Similar 'antik' (i.e. antique) decoration could also be applied to religious buildings (as at the Christ Church Gate of Canterbury Cathedral, c.1519) and tombs (as at Oxborourgh, c.1513). Architectural historian Nikolaus Pevsner considered Old Somerset House (1547-52) to have been the first building to fully adopt "a sense of Italian Renaissance - or by than rather Franco-Italian Renaissance - composition". By now we have entered the reigns of Edward VI (1547-53) and Mary I (1553-58), neither of whom reigned long enough to have a major influence on architecture.

During this period, wider adoption of fireplaces and chimneys ran in tandem with the decline of the great hall and its open hearth, as houses were increasingly made up of multiple uninterrupted floors of more private rooms. Tudor chimney-pieces were made large and elaborate to draw attention to the owner's adoption of this new technology.

=== Elizabethan (1558–1603) ===
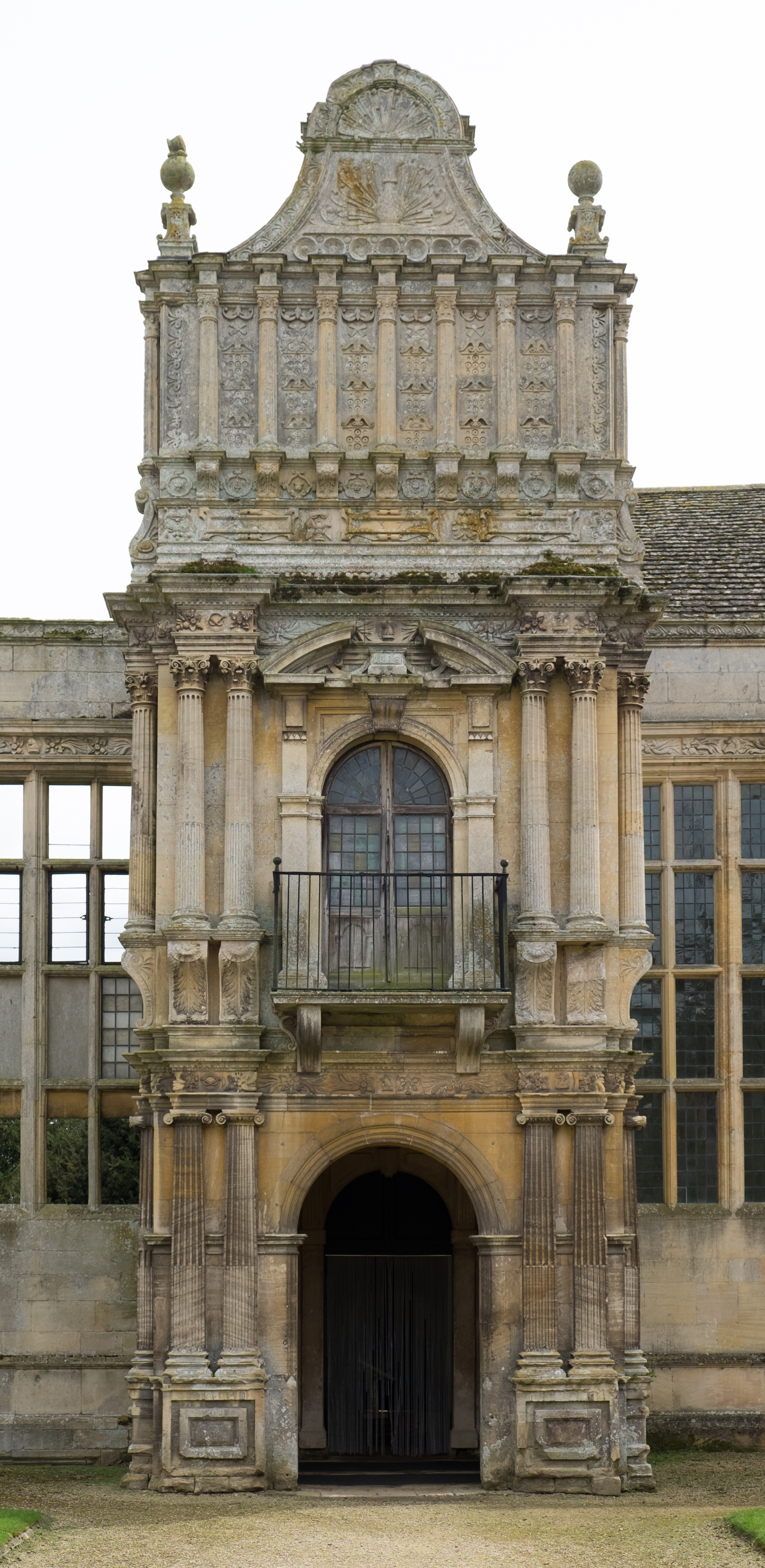
The porch at Kirby Hall, stacking classical forms in a most un-classical way

The reign of Elizabeth I saw the greater adoption of classical forms, derived from Flemish Northern Mannerism via pattern books. Classical features therefore often appeared more like an illustration than a real classical building, particularly in the 'towers of the orders' seen at Burghley House and Kirby Hall. The most immediately identifiable feature of Elizabethan architecture is the mullioned and transomed window, nearly filling the wall at Burghley and Longleat. This lacks the arched heads seen in the early Tudor period, being a simple grid. As well as adopting new classical forms, the Elizabethans valued the 'antique' associations of Gothic and castle forms. In this way, Burghley House (begun 1577) has great bay windows, Tuscan chimneys and a tower of the orders, but also a great hall (with obligatory hammer-beam roof), a turreted gatehouse and a kitchen with a vault copied from Exeter Cathedral. However, the castle features were increasingly buried beneath a classical veneer, with Longleat (begun 1568) perhaps being the first house to entirely eschew Gothic or castle-derived features in favour of a sleek classical silhouette.

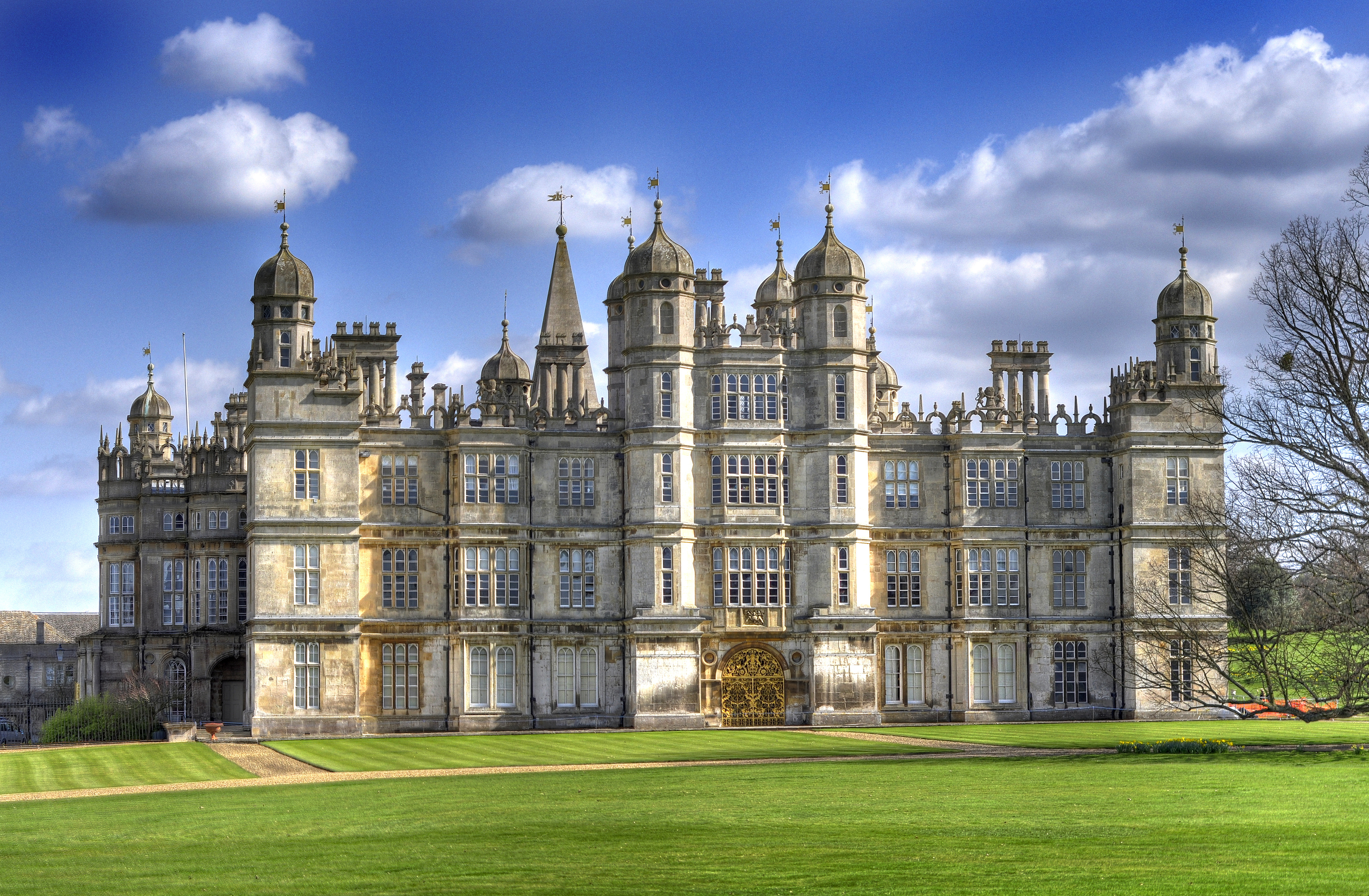
A fantastical castellar silhouette at Burghley

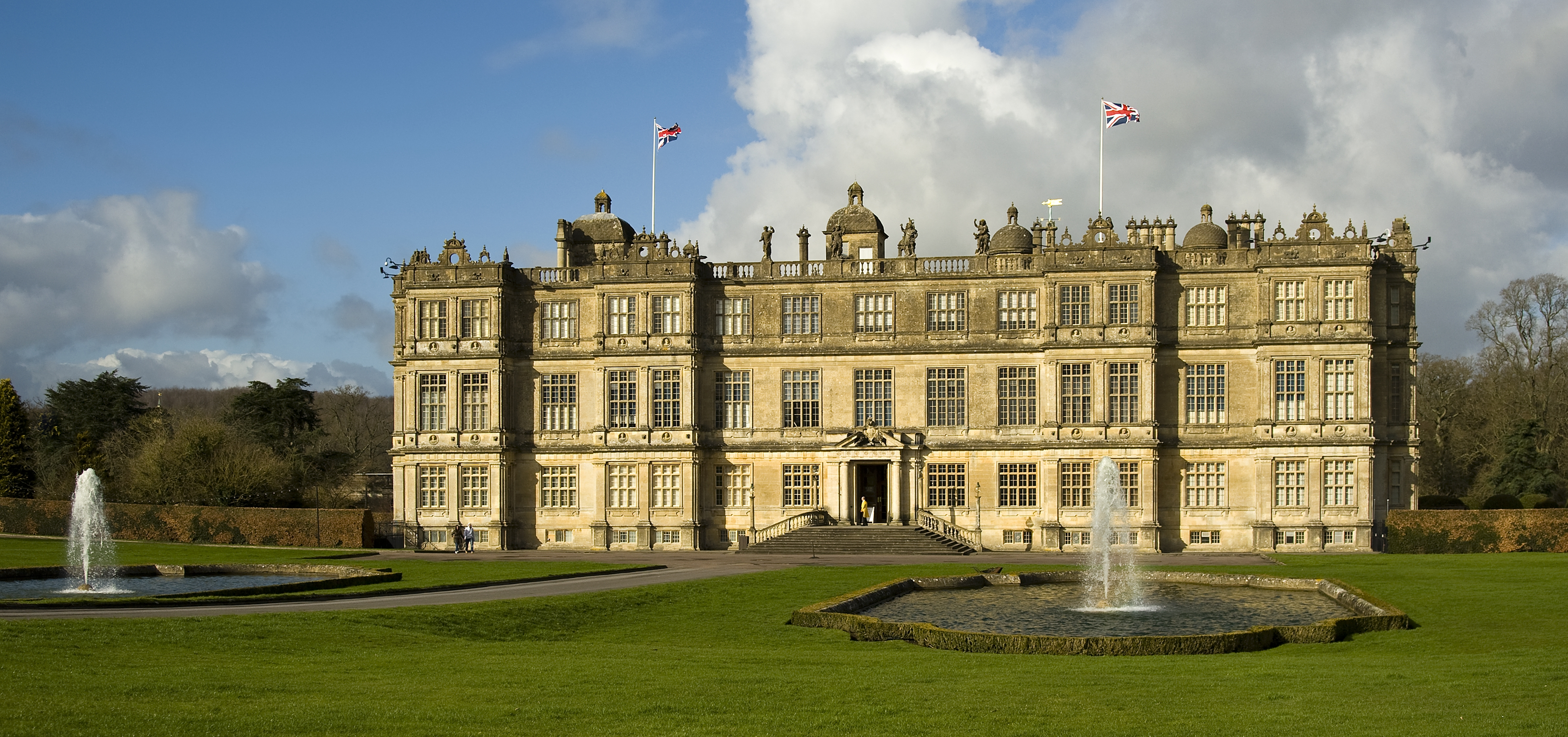
Radical new classicism at Longleat

Rather than build her own palaces, the frugal Elizabeth I let her courtiers compete to bankrupt themselves hosting her on her royal 'progresses' around the country. To accommodate the Court, nobles built prodigy houses, with fantastical silhouettes, vast glazed windows and new-fangled classical ornament. The most famous example of such a royal visit was that of Elizabeth to Kenilworth Castle in July 1575, expensively remodelled by Robert Dudley in a doomed attempt to woo the queen. Another extraordinary case, though it never hosted the queen, was Hardwick Hall, where the indomitable Elizabeth, Countess of Shrewsbury (Bess of Hardwick) rebuilt the Old Hall with large windows and elaborate plasterwork, before deciding it was inadequate and starting the New Hall from scratch. These prodigy houses were often built by "new men" who had enriched themselves in royal service, like William Cecil, rather than the old nobility who already had great castles and houses.

The names of several significant architects (though they did not use that term) are known from this period, including William Arnold, Robert Smythson and John Thorpe. Architectural drawings also survive in increasing quantity, especially by Thorpe, enabling historians to better understand designers' intentions and the form of since-demolished buildings.

The mid to late 16th century also saw the start of the so-called Great Rebuilding of vernacular houses and farms in southern England, though the dating and extent of this is contested.

== Religious architecture ==
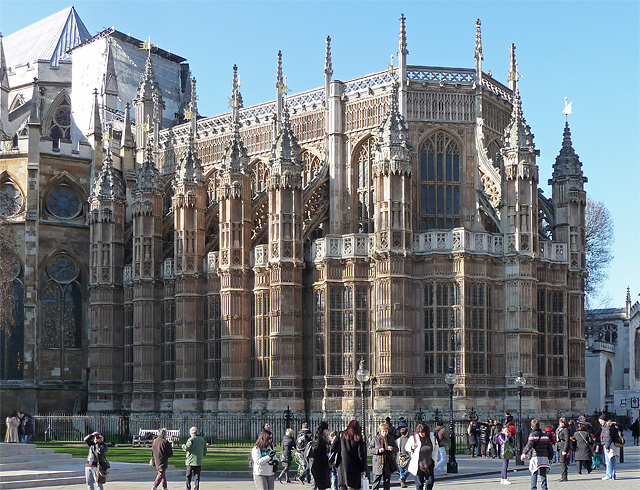
The exterior of Henry VII's Chapel, with compass windows and decoration on every surface.

The early Tudor period saw the completion of many of the greatest English Gothic religious buildings, with the tallest church tower at the Boston Stump (266 feet high, completed c.1515), the highest parochial spire at Louth (287' 6'' high, c.1455–1515), the grandest cathedral tower at Canterbury (1433–97), and the widest fan vault at King's College Chapel, Cambridge (completed 1515). There were also two important buildings started from scratch: Bath Abbey and Henry VII's Chapel at Westminster Abbey. This work all followed the Perpendicular style, established over a century and a half earlier. However, work done by Court masons, forming what Francis Woodman termed the 'Windsor-Westminster School' was noticeably more ornate than the work of previous years. This may be seen clearly at King's College Chapel, where the eastern buttresses of the 1450s are plain, while the Tudor buttresses to the west are festooned with carved heraldic symbols. The difference was striking enough for John Harvey to consider Tudor Gothic to be a distinct style, though this is not the consensus among architectural historians. The Court style was notable for elaborate fan or pendant vaults, ogee-domed turrets and complex polygonal plans, as well as a general tendency towards the minuscule, in a form reminiscent of tomb architecture. These changes towards the complex and ornate were likely due to continental influence from Flamboyant Gothic in France and Flanders. The elaborate planning of the bay windows in Henry VII's Chapel, themselves derived from Windsor Castle, inspired the "compass window" in secular architecture, showing the connection between the sacred and the secular in the Gothic age.

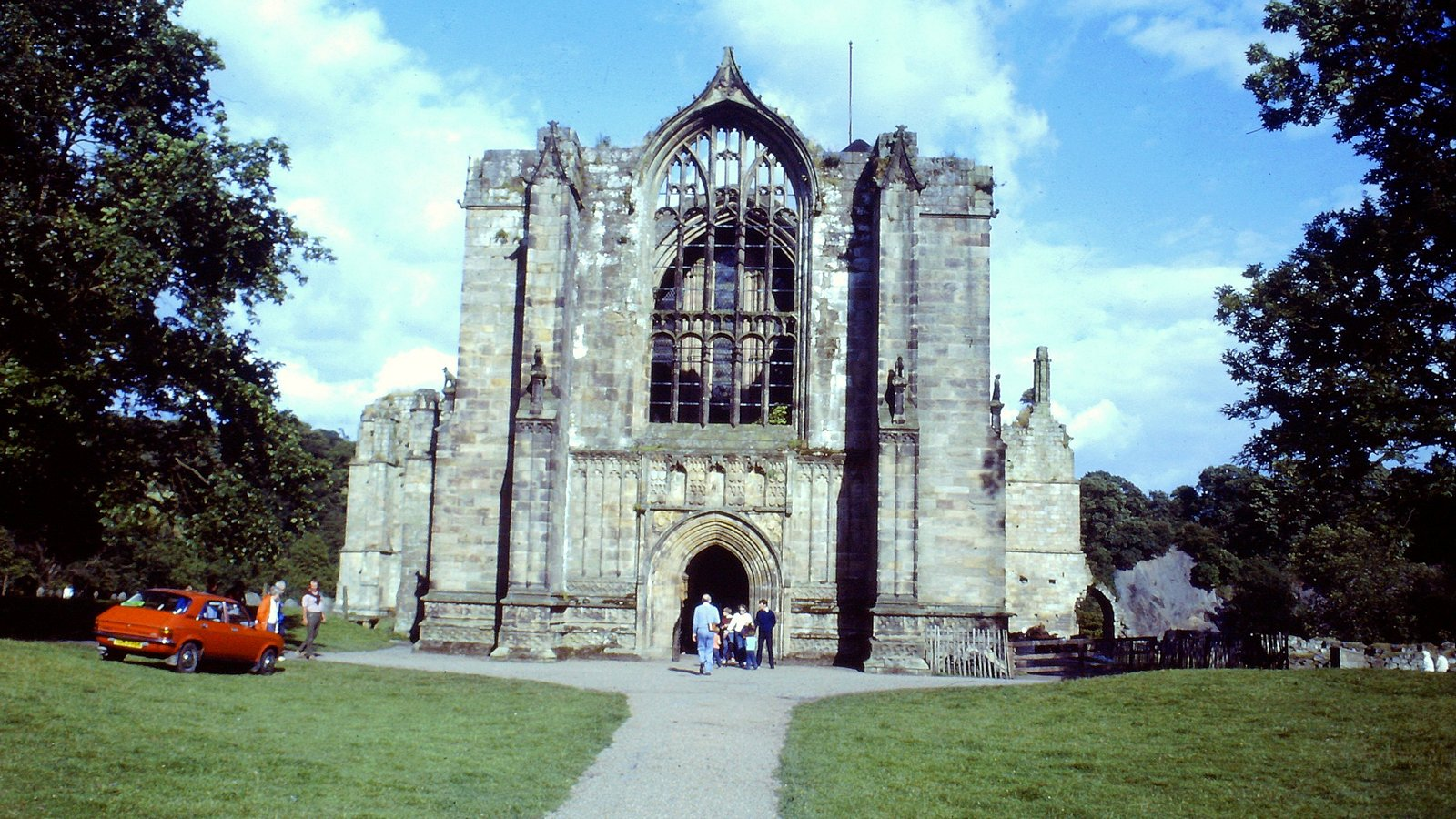
Bolton Priory, before a modern roof was erected over the incomplete tower. The nave survived as a parish church, while the transept ruins are on the right.

Monastic building abruptly ceased at the Reformation: an evocative example is the west tower at Bolton Priory, left half-finished since the royal commissioners sent the masons away in 1539. Work on parish churches was not directly affected by the Reformation to the same degree, but the changed religious climate and the decline in the wool trade that had funded the grandest churches meant that work ground to a halt, with some buildings summarily completed without pinnacles and other ornamentation. Church building was not to be seen again on a major scale until the 1660s.

=== Symbolism and recusancy ===
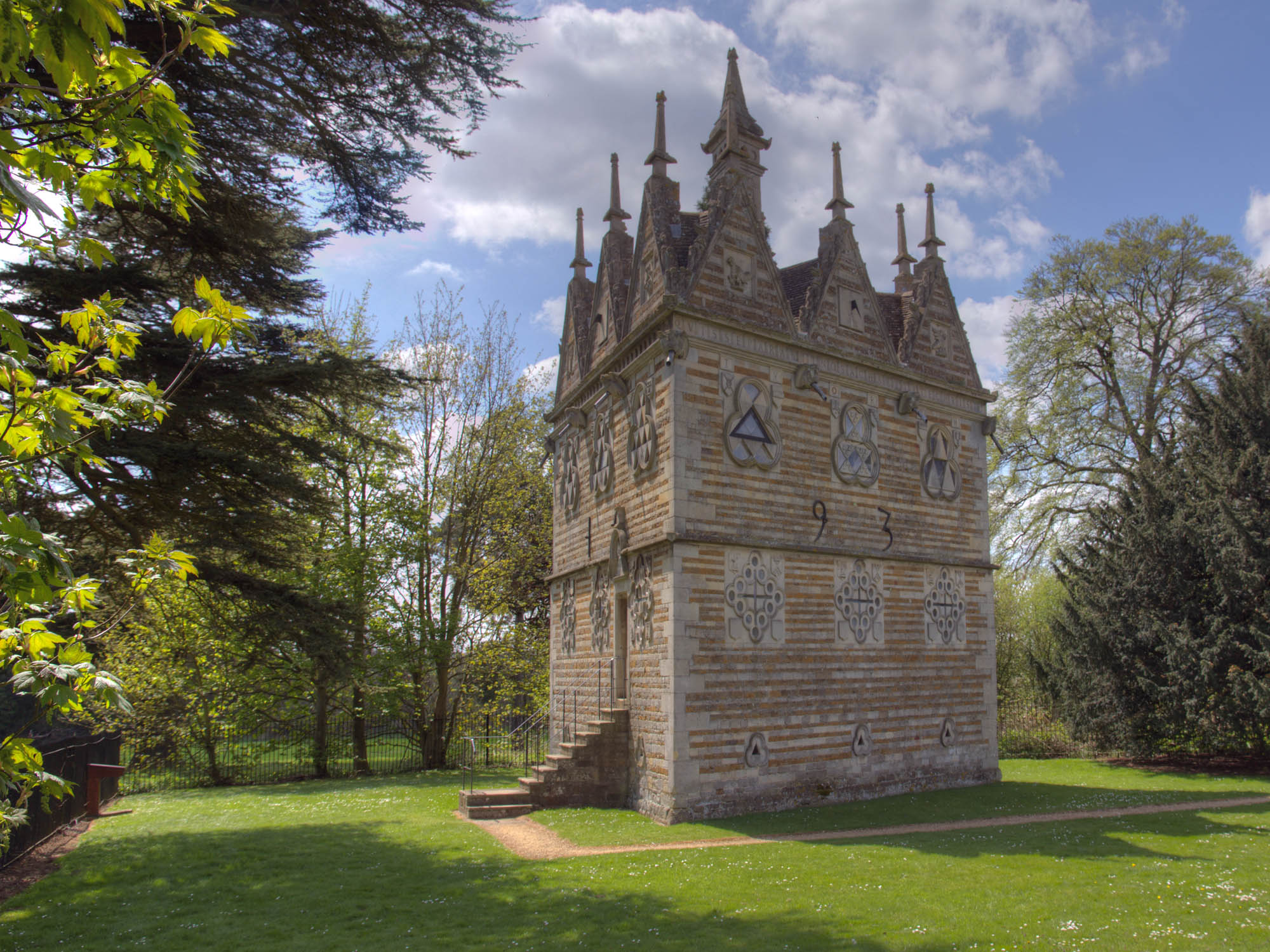
Rushton Triangular Lodge

Although overt religious architecture virtually ceased, Tudor patrons still enjoyed the possibilities of symbolic architecture. It is open to question whether the H- and E-shaped floor plans really stood for Henry and Elizabeth, or were just a convenient way to arrange rooms, but decorative "devices", such as pomegranates for Catherine of Aragon or "HA" symbols for Henry VIII and Anne Boleyn, were common ways to show loyalty to the Tudor dynasty, in stone, wood, glass, paint and plaster. It was common for great houses to have private chapels, whether Catholic or Protestant, but this was particularly important under the recusancy laws of Elizabeth I, when Catholic families had to conceal their faith. A related development was the installation of secret priest holes in recusants' houses, like Baddesley Clinton, where a Catholic priest could hide from the authorities. An extraordinary case was that of Sir Thomas Tresham (1543–1605), who erected two very symbolic buildings on his Northamptonshire estates. Rushton Triangular Lodge (1594–97) is, as the name suggests, triangular in plan, with three triangular gables on each face, three floors, and windows made of trefoils and triangles, symbolising the Trinity and the Catholic Mass as well as punning Tresham's own name. Meanwhile Lyveden New Bield (begun 1594) has a Greek cross plan, symbolising the Passion, while the metopes of the Classical frieze feature the Instruments of the Passion, the IHS monogram, and the Chi-Rho symbol of the papacy. Unsurprisingly, Sir Thomas spent much of his later life in prison.

== Military architecture ==
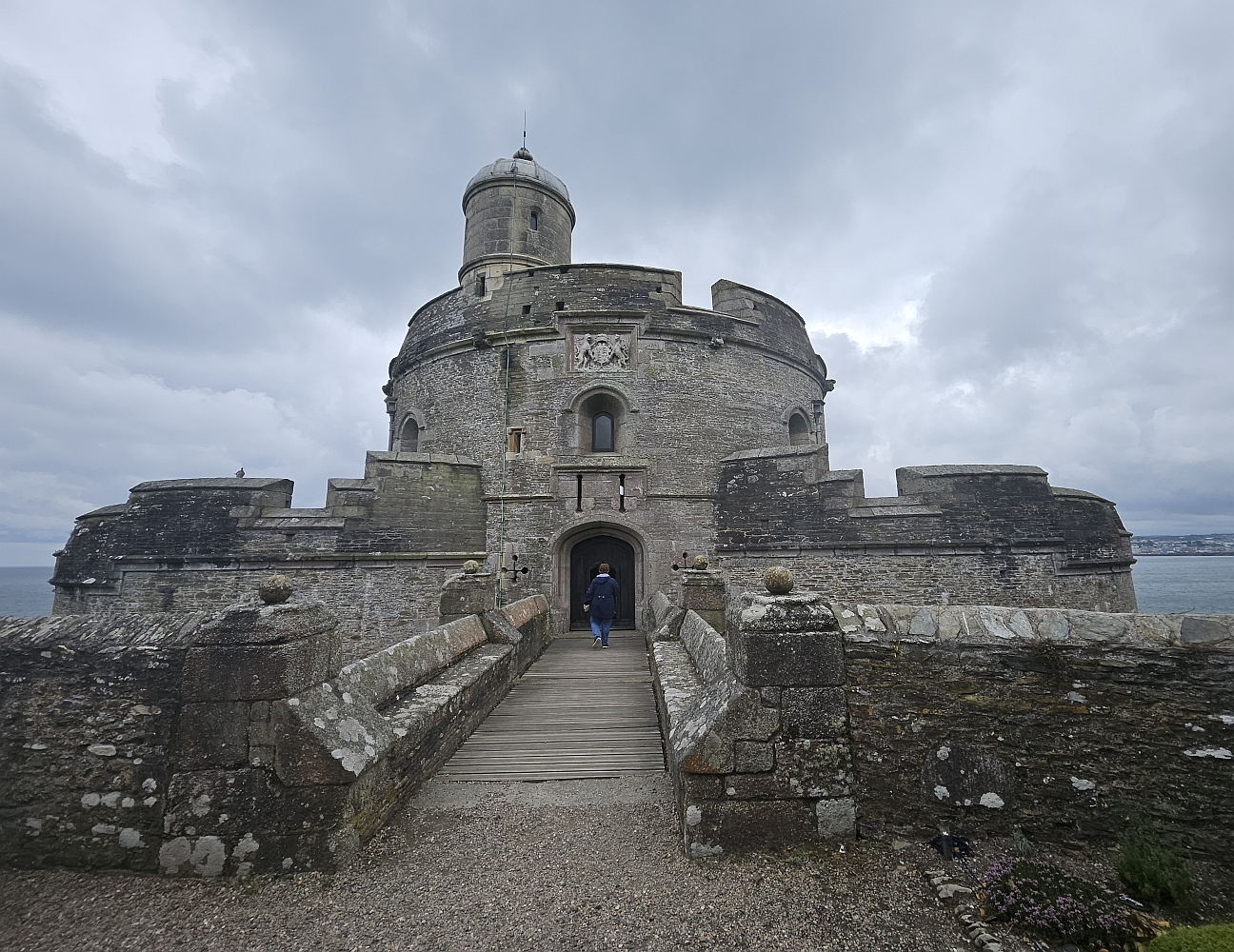
St Mawes Castle, the most ornamental of the Device Forts.

Two major developments affected Tudor military architecture. The first was the decline of the castle as a military institution, so that fortification became a civic rather than a private endeavour. This could be seen in southern England before the Tudor era, for example in the 14th–15th century municipal fortification of Dartmouth Castle, but characterised the Tudor age. The second was the growing efficacy of cannon. This had been painfully demonstrated to the English in the Hundred Years' War, where the French artillery had reduced the English fortresses to rubble. Future fortifications had to both resist the impact of cannonballs and mount defensive artillery. The primary threats to England were from France and Scotland, so fortifications were concentrated on the south coast and northern border. Dartmouth Castle was the earliest artillery fort in England, being begun in the 1480s and completed, after much cajoling from Henry VII, in 1493. It is a tall tower with round and square sections, pierced by wide rectangular embrasures to house guns defending the river from enemy ships. Early artillery works were also seen at the Prince-Bishop of Durham's castle of Norham, which had been destroyed by the Scots in the Flodden campaign of 1513. The reconstruction featured earth banks, to protect the walls from cannon-fire, and pentagonal bastions. After Henry VIII's break with Rome, England faced the threat of a combined invasion from France and the Holy Roman Empire, leading to the construction of a series of around thirty forts, termed Device Forts, along the south coast in the 1540s. Examples include Deal, Walmer, Calshot, Pendennis and St Mawes. They were low, with thick curved battlements to resist artillery, and complex concentric clover-leaf plans formed of overlapping circles to ensure overlapping fields of fire. They are without parallel in Europe, their forms being obsolete even when built. A related work was the semicircular Half-Moon Battery covering the inner gate at Carlisle Castle. This was designed by Stephan von Haschenperg, a man of few obvious qualifications who appears to have been dismissed after a short while.

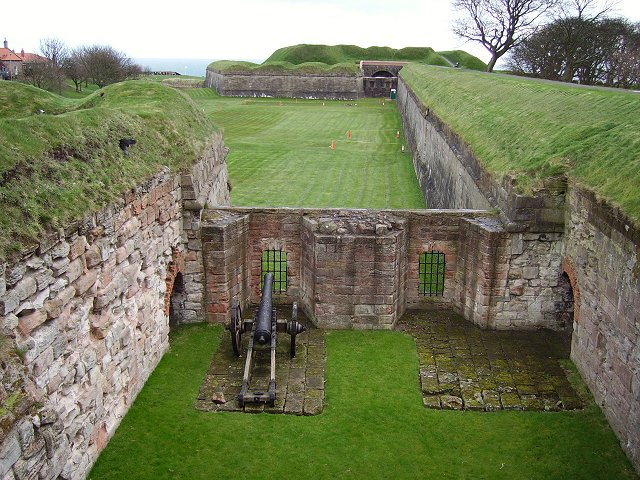
Angled flanking bastions at Berwick

The future of military architecture, as developed by the Italians, was to be the angled earthen bastion. This was used at Henry VIII's fort at Yarmouth, but was not deployed at scale until the reign of Elizabeth I, when lines of angled bastions were erected around the medieval castle of Carisbrooke (1583–1603), the Device Fort of Pendennis and the border town of Berwick. This type of fortification remained the norm, with modifications, until guns were radically improved in the 19th century.

=== The architecture of the navy ===
The dry dock in Portsmouth is significant as it laid the foundation for other civic projects done under Henry VIII and Elizabeth I. Built under Henry VII, it enabled the maintenance of the navy developed by Henry VIII, establishing England as a major seafaring power in the Age of Discovery. Purchasing eight acres, he gave the job of constructing the dry dock to Sir Reginald Bray. It measured 330 feet on each side, the bottom of the dock 395 feet long, and the whole 22 feet deep. The wharf on the outside of the piers that marked the dock's location were 40 feet on each side at a depth of 22 feet. The dock operated by swinging some hinged gates open, allowing the ship to enter, and then water was taken out with a bucket and chain pump worked by a horse-gin.

== Features ==
=== Plan forms ===
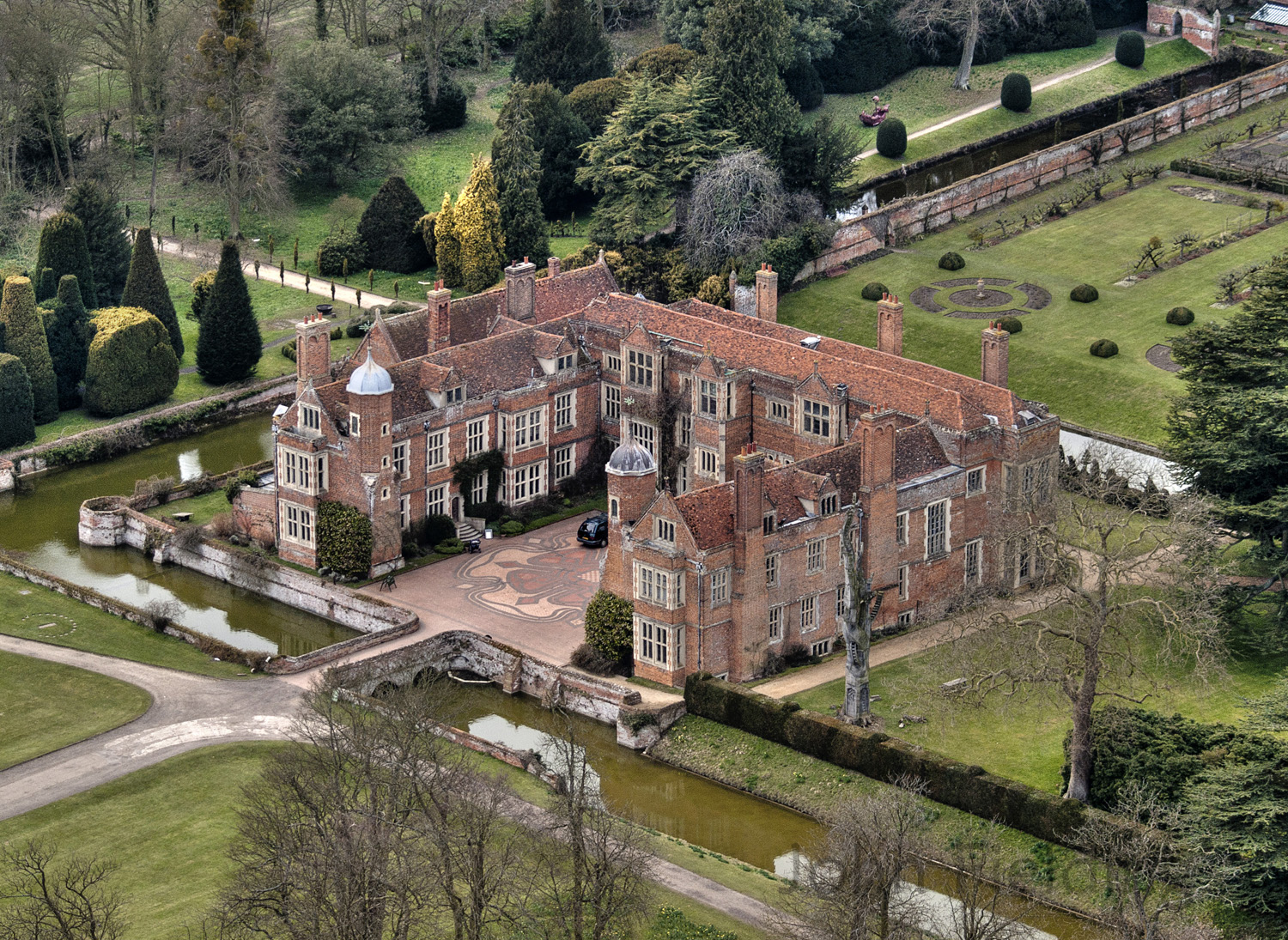
Brick architecture at Kentwell Hall

In the early Tudor period, the medieval double courtyard plan was regarded as the ideal for great houses: the inner courtyard contained the domestic apartments, while the outer courtyard had the servants' lodgings and the service buildings. Such a plan can be seen at the medieval and Tudor house of Haddon Hall. As one moved down the social scale, plans became simpler, but were still based on the hall, even in the humblest dwellings. In some parts of western England, the hall was already ceiled over, instead of rising to the rafters. The Renaissance house was an outward-facing block rather than an inward-facing series of courtyards. This was partly because lords no longer needed to accommodate large numbers of liveried retainers. This block could be E- or H-shaped, with the hall (now more often ceiled over) forming the central stroke. Lower-status houses also had their halls ceiled over to provide better circulation and more comfortable rooms. Elizabethan noble houses also often had long galleries, as at Montacute House, in which to exercise indoors and display artwork. Garderobes fell out of fashion in the Tudor period, as chamber pots and close stools became more widely used.

=== Construction ===
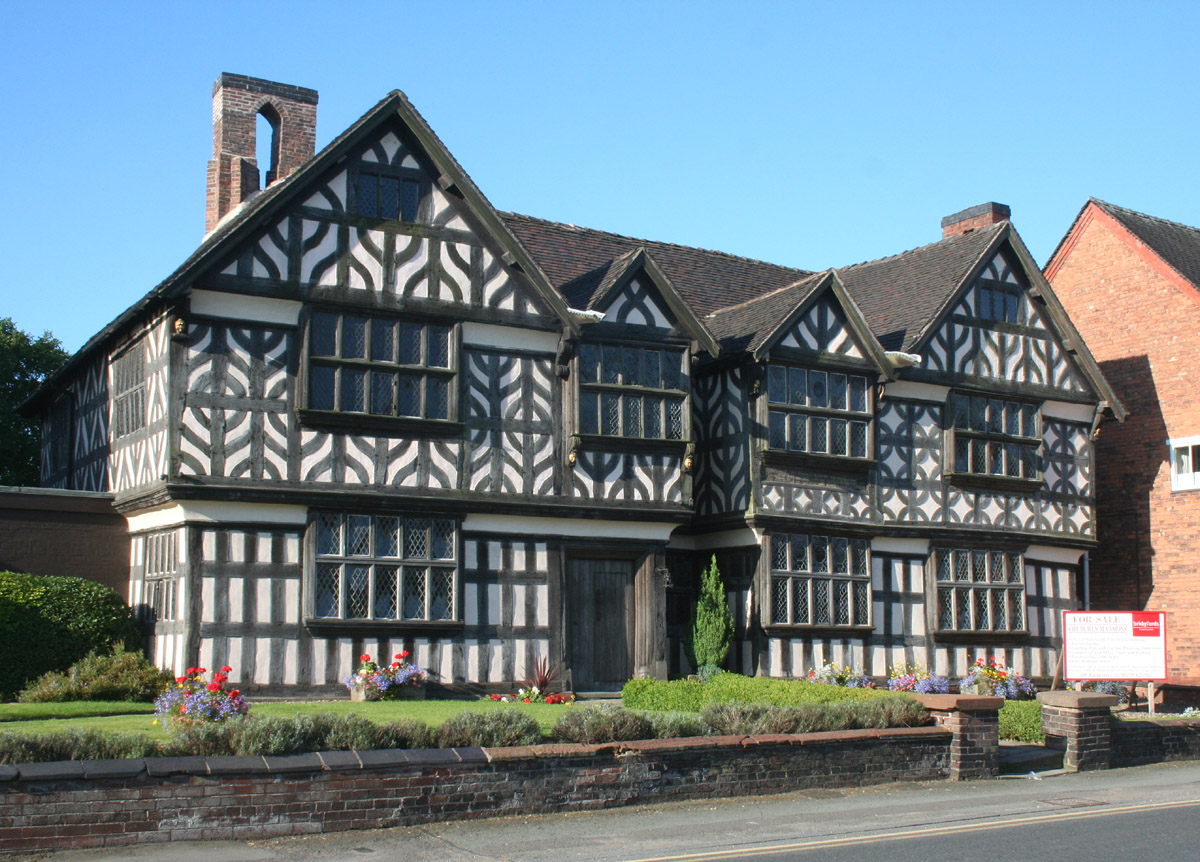
Cheshire timber framing at Churche's Mansion, Nantwich

Construction materials, even in the grandest palaces, depended on what was locally available, as transport of materials was expensive. High-status buildings were usually constructed of stone (some reused from dissolved monasteries and derelict castles) or brick, the latter being increasingly popular in eastern England, which lacks good building stone. Lesser buildings were generally timber framed, with infill panels of wattle and daub. There was great regional variation in timber framing techniques: eastern England used close studding, with thin vertical panels, while western England used bigger timbers forming square panels. In Cheshire and the surrounding areas, timber framing became very elaborate, with elaborate cusping and curved bracing, as at Little Moreton Hall. Upper floors could be jettied, especially in towns, to gain more space. Cruck framing was used for humbler dwellings across western England. Some regions also used earth construction methods, like cob in the West Country, clay dabbins on the Solway plain, and wychert in Buckinghamshire.

=== Chimneys ===
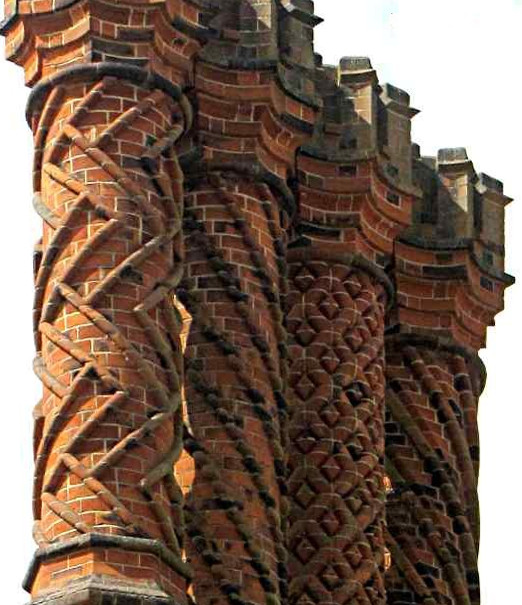
Brick chimneys at Hampton Court Palace

Chimneys became an increasingly prominent architectural feature, as fireplaces replaced open hearths in higher-status houses. The finest chimneys in the early Tudor period were of brick, laid in exotic twisted patterns, as at Hampton Court Palace. Chimneys were such a status symbol that false ones could be fitted where there was no fireplace, as at Framlingham Castle in either the 1470s or 1510s. Later chimneys use Renaissance forms, as at Burghley House, where they are disguised as Classical columns.

=== Roofs ===
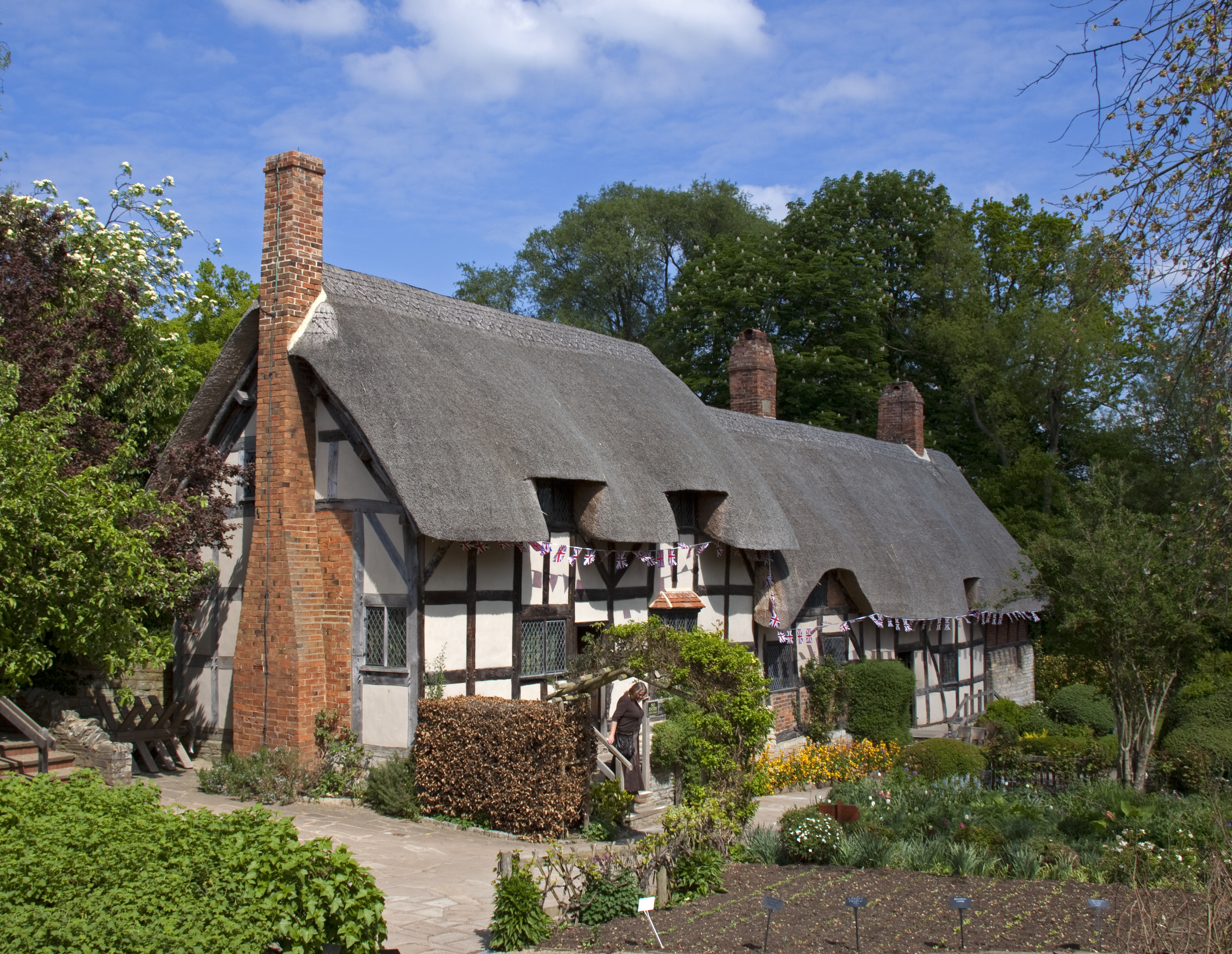
Anne Hathaway's Cottage, a timber-framed farmhouse

Roofs were generally gabled, though some grand houses like Longleat had flat lead roofs. The skyline was an important decorative feature, with chimneys, finials, turrets, gables and parapets creating a fantastical silhouette. Gables of stepped or curved forms and strapwork, derived from Dutch pattern books, were used in eastern England later in the period. Lead ogee domes were occasionally used over turrets, notably on the White Tower at the Tower of London. Roofing materials depended on what was locally available, with thatch being used on most vernacular buildings and tiles or stone slates on more expensive ones.

=== Windows, doors and openings ===
While glass was becoming cheaper, it was still very expensive, and the wealthy displayed their status with vast windows of glass, including heraldic stained glass, as at Hardwick Hall, immortalised as being "more glass than wall". Window details became simpler, with the arches at the heads of lights losing their cusping and getting flatter, before finally disappearing altogether to leave the archetypal Elizabethan mullioned and transomed window. Windows generally had hood moulds above to shed the rain. Bay windows and oriels were used as decorative features. The elaborate compass window was popular in the early 16th century, as at Thornbury Castle, being derived from Henry VII's Tower at Windsor Castle and his chapel at Westminster Abbey. Doors and other openings were usually arched, especially early in the period, with a low four-centred or Tudor arch (the difference being that a four-centred arch is formed of four arcs, while a 'Tudor' arch is two arcs and two straight lines). Semicircular arches came back into fashion as part of the Renaissance, though buildings like Gonville and Caius College could combine pointed arches with Renaissance ornament.

A four-centred arch, showing how the whole arch is curved

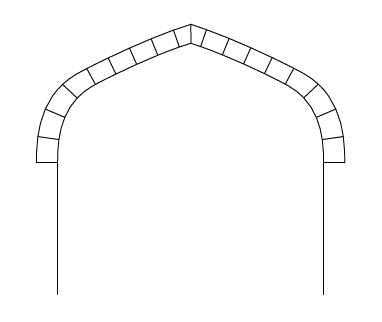
A 'Tudor' arch, with two curves and two straight lines

=== Fireplaces ===
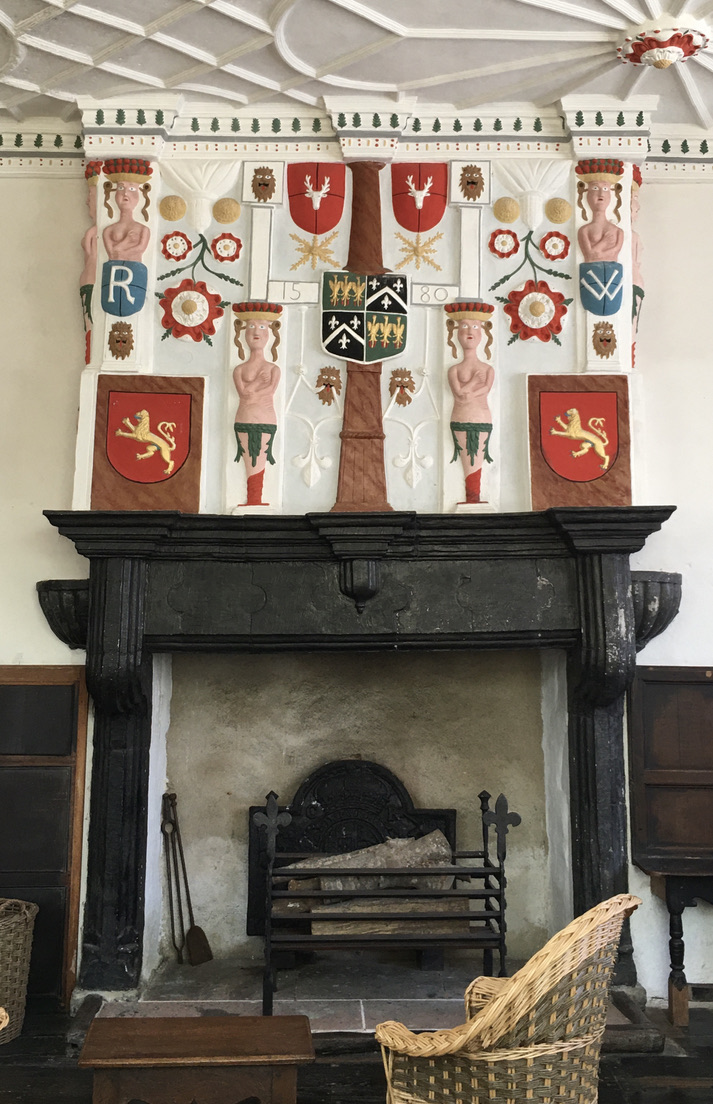
A local interpretation of Renaissance forms in the hall fireplace of Plas Mawr, Conwy

Though fireplaces had been a feature of grand houses since the 12th century, they became increasingly common in the Tudor period, as the great hall was ceiled over (making an open hearth impossible) and the number of heated private rooms increased. Early fireplaces had a shallow arch, generally with heraldry over, but they were soon a setting for extravagant Classical ornament, with caryatids and examples of the Orders proving popular. Kitchens had wide fireplaces for roasting, with a spit turned by a boy or later a dog. The use of a dog in a treadmill required complex iron machinery. Many vernacular houses only had one heated room, where a large inglenook would be used for cooking and heating, with meat being hung to smoke in the chimney-hood above.

=== Ceilings ===
Open timber roofs were still used in churches and halls, with the hammer-beam being the most popular form at the top of society, though the decoration tended towards the Renaissance. Hampton Court Palace has a notable hammer-beam roof, while Burghley House has a late example. Open halls remained in use in Inns of Court and Oxbridge colleges after they had fallen out of favour in houses. Ceilings became more common, as houses had more low rooms. Initially, they were decorated with moulded beams and paint, as in the parlour at Haddon Hall, but plaster ceilings, decorated with vine, heraldic, geometric or strapwork motifs, began to be used as at Levens Hall. Plaster ceilings could have hanging pendants to make them three-dimensional.

=== Decoration ===
Initially, great houses were decorated with tapestries, or with cheaper painted cloths imitating them. These served a triple purpose of keeping out chill, decorating the interior, and displaying wealth. In the wealthiest homes these may contain gold or silver thread. Cornelius van der Strete added arms and ciphers to royal tapestries. Later, they were replaced by timber panelling. This could have linenfold decoration or Classical ornament, as in the spectacular Inlaid Chamber at Sizergh Castle. Much ornament took the form of heraldry or ciphers displaying loyalty to the monarch and boasting of the occupying family's pedigree. Otherwise, ornament was of Classical origin, generally more 'correctly' interpreted and better executed higher up the social ladder, with much being derived from pattern books. This led to concoctions like the Towers of the Orders on the porches at Burghley and Kirby Hall, which had no precedent in Roman or Italian buildings. This detailing was often painted and gilded, making the buildings more vibrant than they are today.

=== Gardens ===
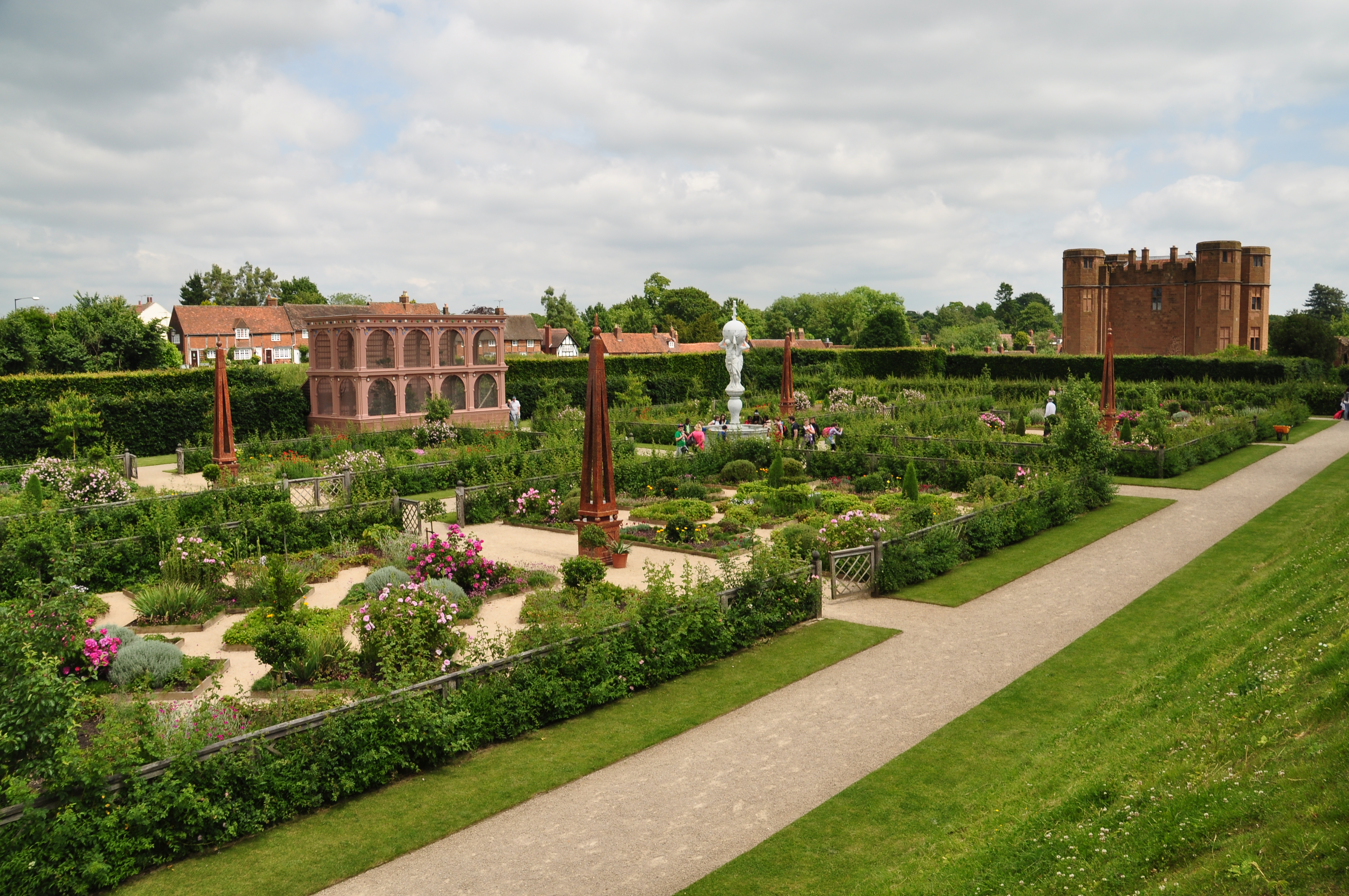
Re-created Elizabethan gardens at Kenilworth Castle

Large geometric gardens and enclosed courtyards were a feature of the very wealthy. Fountains begin to appear in the reign of Henry VIII. A modern recreation of an Elizabethan garden can be seen at Kenilworth Castle. Lesser houses had herb gardens to provide food.

== Examples ==
=== Institutional ===
==== Ecclesiastical ====
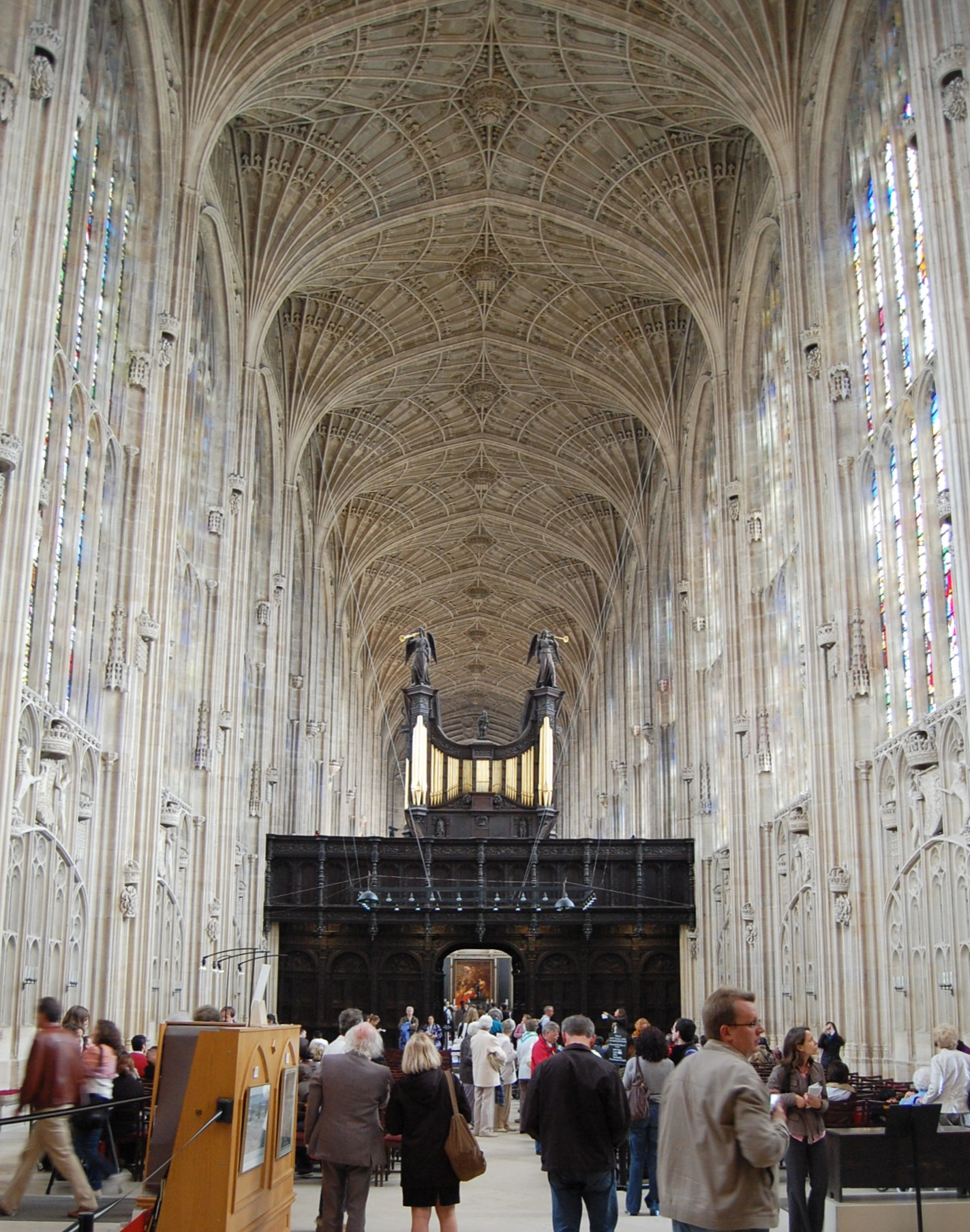
The fan-vaulted ante-chapel of King's College Chapel, Cambridge (1508-15). The Renaissance timber screen and stained glass windows also date from the reign of Henry VIII

- The final stages of King's College Chapel, Cambridge (1446–1515, John Wastell)
- St Peter and St Paul's Church, Lavenham, Suffolk (1485–1525, John Wastell)
- Red Mount Chapel, King's Lynn, Norfolk (c. 1485–1533, attributed to John Wastell)
- St. George's Chapel, Windsor Castle, nave (1475–1528, the Vertue brothers)
- St Winefride's Well Holywell, Flintshire, Wales (1490)
- The central tower (Bell Harry) and strainer arches of Canterbury Cathedral, Kent (1493–97, John Wastell)
- The retrochoir (New Building) at Peterborough Cathedral, Cambs. (1496-1508, attributed to John Wastell)
- Bath Abbey, Somerset (1501–39, completed in the 19th century, the Vertue brothers)
- The nave of St Edmundsbury Cathedral (formerly St James' Church), Suffolk (1503, John Wastell)
- The nave of Ripon Cathedral, N. Yorks. (1502–22)
- Henry VII Lady Chapel at Westminster Abbey, London (1503–1509, the Vertue brothers)
- Church of St. John the Baptist, Cirencester, Glos. (1508–30)
- Chantry chapels at Ely Cathedral, Exeter Cathedral, Worcester Cathedral, Salisbury Cathedral, Winchester Cathedral and others

==== Academic ====
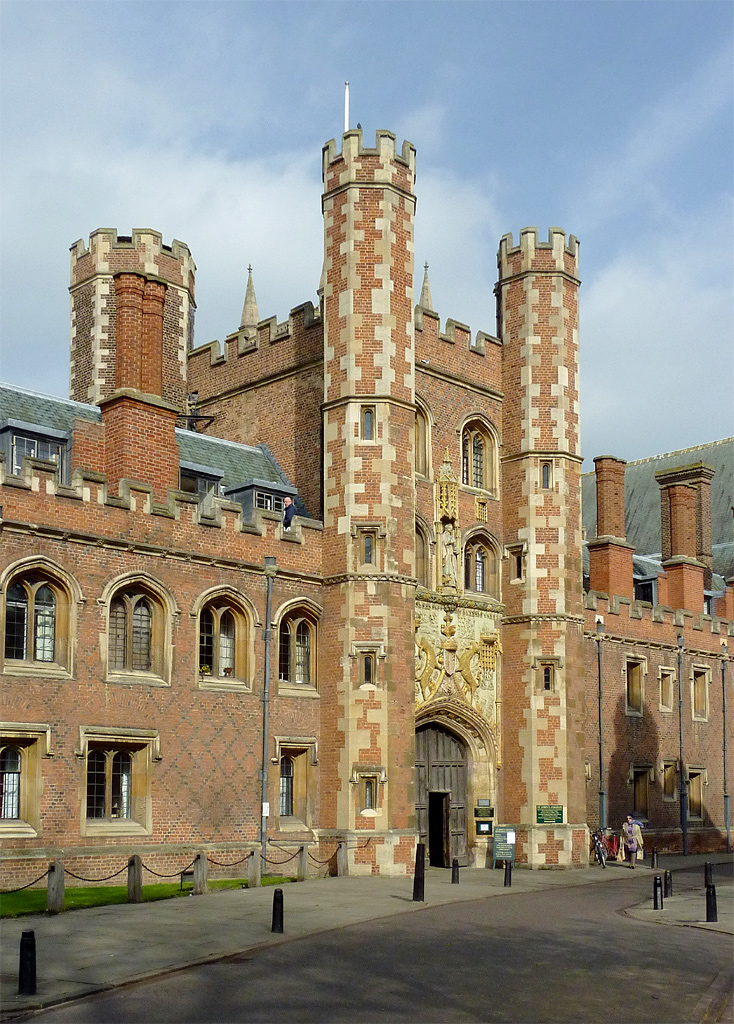
Great Gate, St. John's College, Cambridge (1511-20)

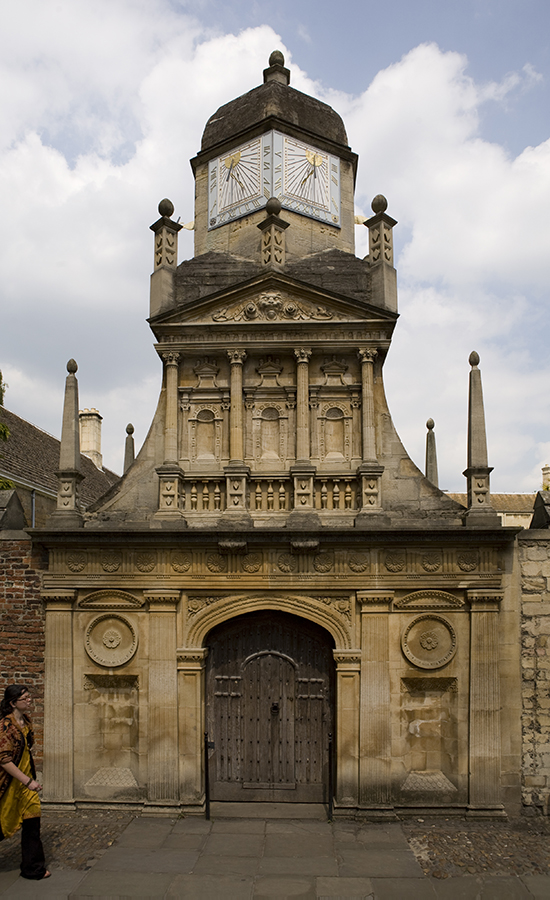
The Gate of Honour, Caius Court, Gonville & Caius College, Cambridge (1565)

- Magdalen Tower, Oxford (1492–1509)
- First Court, Christ's College, Cambridge (1505–11)
- Old Quad, Brasenose College, Oxford (1509–22)
- First Court (1511–20) & Second Court (1598–1602), St. John's College, Cambridge
- Front Quad, Corpus Christi College, Oxford (1517)
- Tom Quad, Christ Church, Oxford (1525–29)
- Caius Court, Gonville & Caius College, Cambridge (1565)
- Great Court, Trinity College, Cambridge (1599–1608)

==== Commercial / civic ====
- Thaxted Guildhall, Essex (late 15th century)
- Malmesbury Market Cross, Wiltshire (c. 1490)
- Market Cross, Shepton Mallet, Somerset (c. 1500)
- Lavenham Guildhall, Suffolk (1529)
- Much Wenlock Guildhall, Shropshire (1587)
- Old Market Hall, Shrewsbury, Shropshire (1597)
- Old Royal Exchange, London (1565–71 by Thomas Gresham; burned 1666)

==== Inns of Court ====
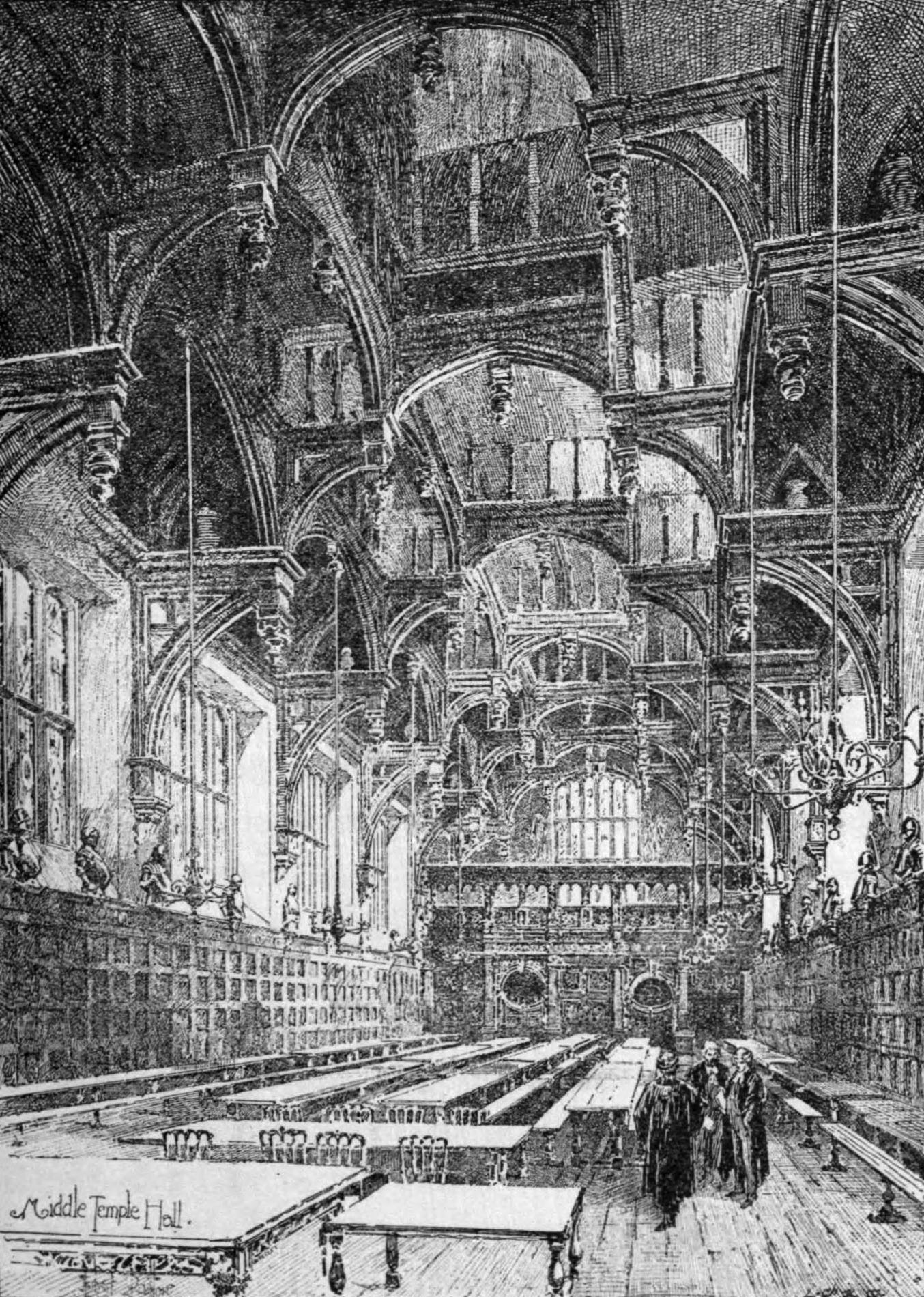
The Hall, Middle Temple, London; damaged and rebuilt after World War II

- Lincoln's Inn Old Hall (c. 1490)
- Gray's Inn Hall (1559; damaged in the Blitz and restored)
- Middle Temple Hall (1562–72; damaged in the Blitz and restored)
- Staple Inn (1580–86; damaged in the Blitz and restored)

==== Other ====
- Ford's Hospital, Coventry
- Globe Theatre, London (1599; d. & rebuilt, 1613–14; b. 1644) Replica built away from original site on South Bank of the Thames.
- Lord Leycester's Hospital, Warwick
- Lyveden New Bield, Northants (begun 1594, left incomplete 1605). Sir Thomas Tresham's summer-house
- Rushton Triangular Lodge, Northants (1594–97)

=== Domestic ===
==== Royal palaces ====
- Henry VII, Greenwich Palace, Greenwich, London (1498–1504; demolished. 1660) Known from illustrations and archaeology. Foundations directly underneath Greenwich Naval College.
- Henry VII, Richmond Palace, Richmond-upon-Thames, London (1498–1502, d. 1649) Fragments of original palace still extant. Fell out of favour after the Stuart Dynasty.
- Henry VIII, Bridewell Palace, London (1515–23, b. 1666)
- Henry VIII, Palace of Beaulieu, Essex (1516–27, partially dem.)
- Henry VIII, Leeds Castle, Kent (renovations, 1519)
- Henry VIII, Hunsdon House, Herts. (1525 expansion of a 15th century tower, mostly rebuilt in the 19th century)
- Henry VIII, St. James's Palace, Westminster, London (1531–44)
- Henry VIII, Oatlands Palace, Surrey (1538, dem.)
- Henry VIII, Queen Elizabeth's Hunting Lodge at Great Standing, Chingford, London (1542–43)
- Henry VIII, Nonsuch Palace, Epsom, Surrey (1538; dem. 1682)

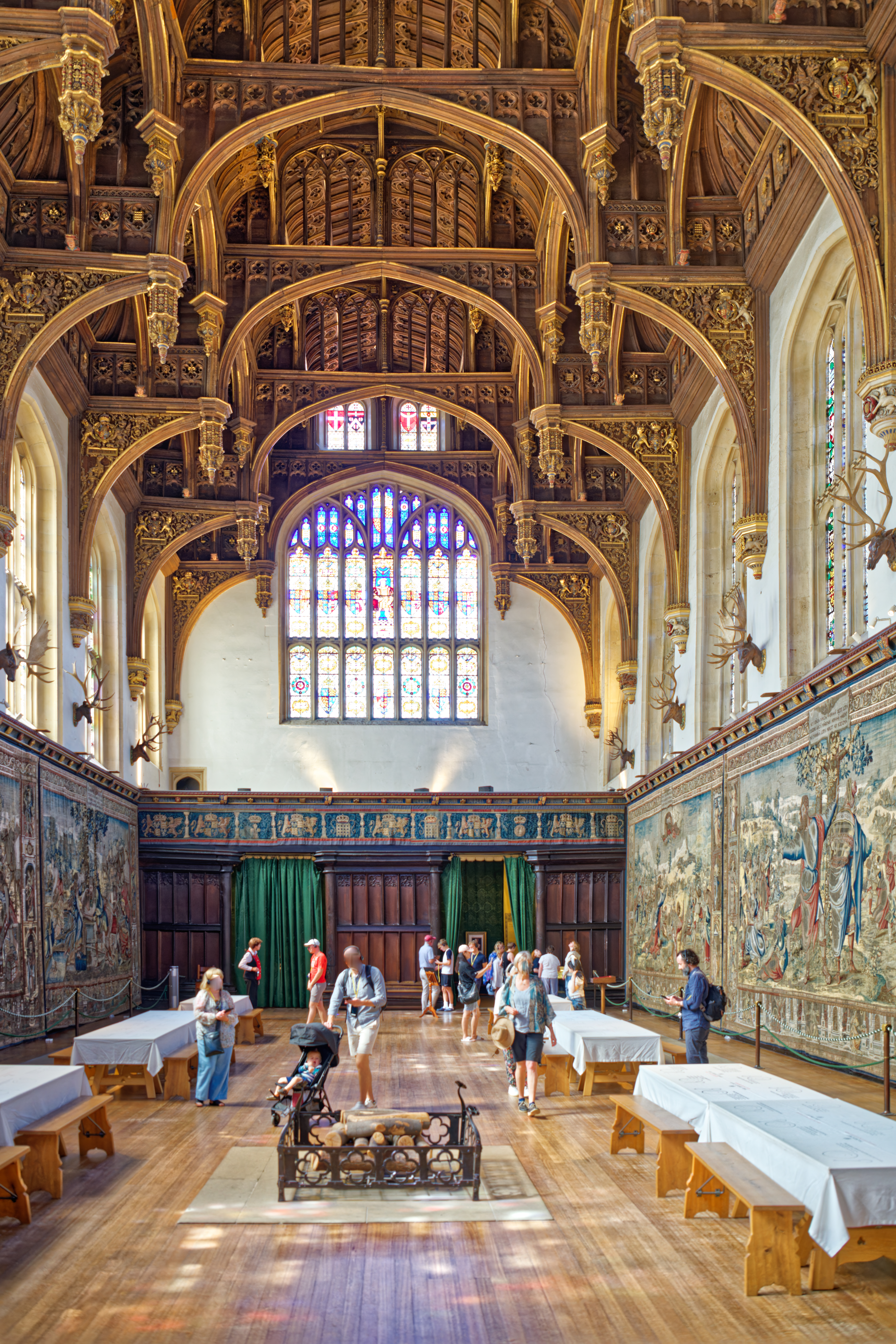
Great Hall, Hampton Court Palace

==== Episcopal palaces ====
- Bishop Richard FitzJames, Fulham Palace, Fulham, London (1480–1522)
- Cardinal Morton, portions of Lambeth Palace, Lambeth, London (1495)
- Cardinal Morton, Hatfield Old Palace, Herts. (1497, partly dem.)
- Cardinal Wolsey, Hampton Court Palace, Richmond-upon-Thames, London (1498–1502, much expanded by Henry VIII and partly rebuilt in the 17th century)
- Cardinal Wolsey, Palace of Whitehall, Westminster, London (1514–30; burned 1691; see Holbein Gate)

==== Houses of the nobility and gentry ====
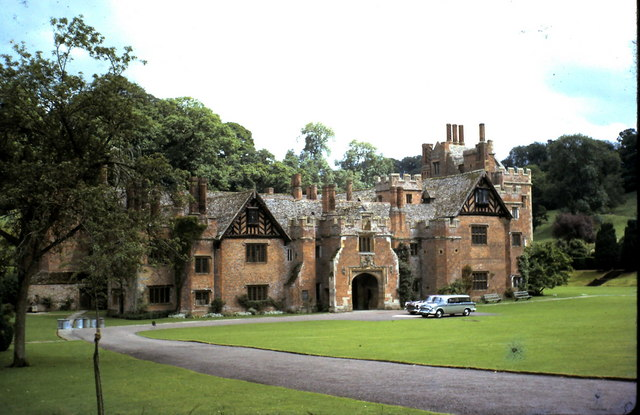
Compton Wynyates, Warwickshire

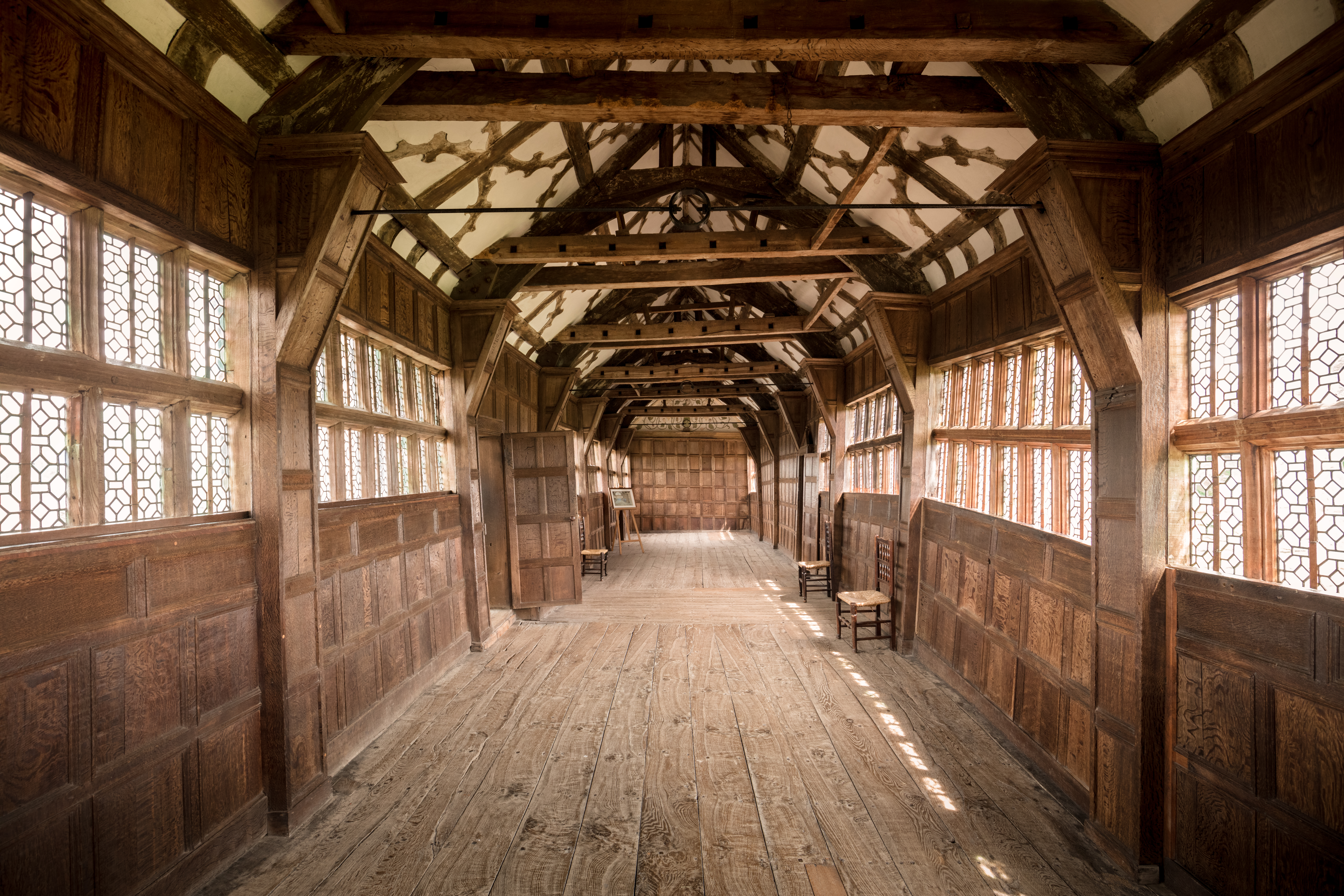
The long gallery, Little Moreton Hall, Cheshire

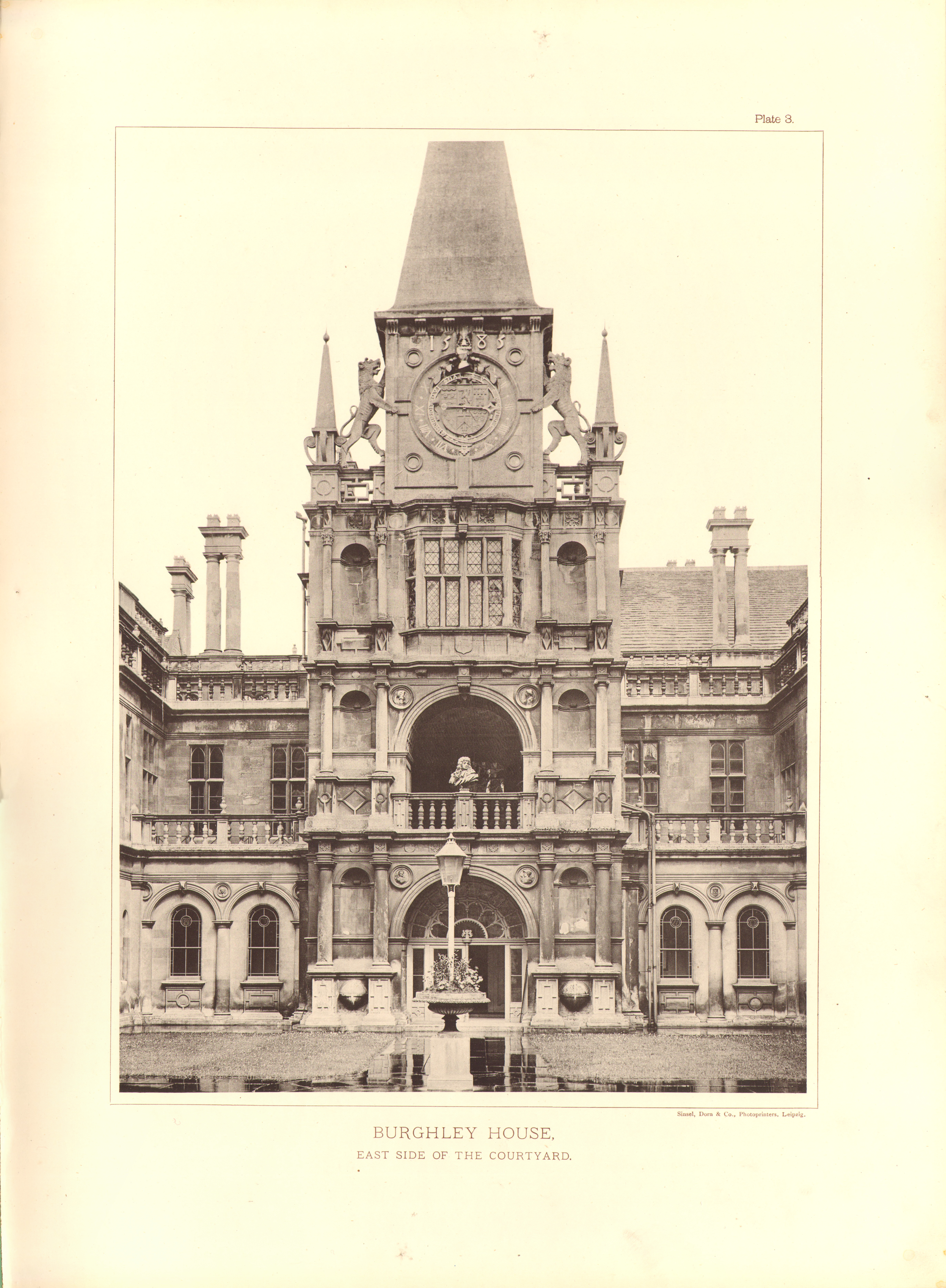
Portal, Burghley House, near Peterborough

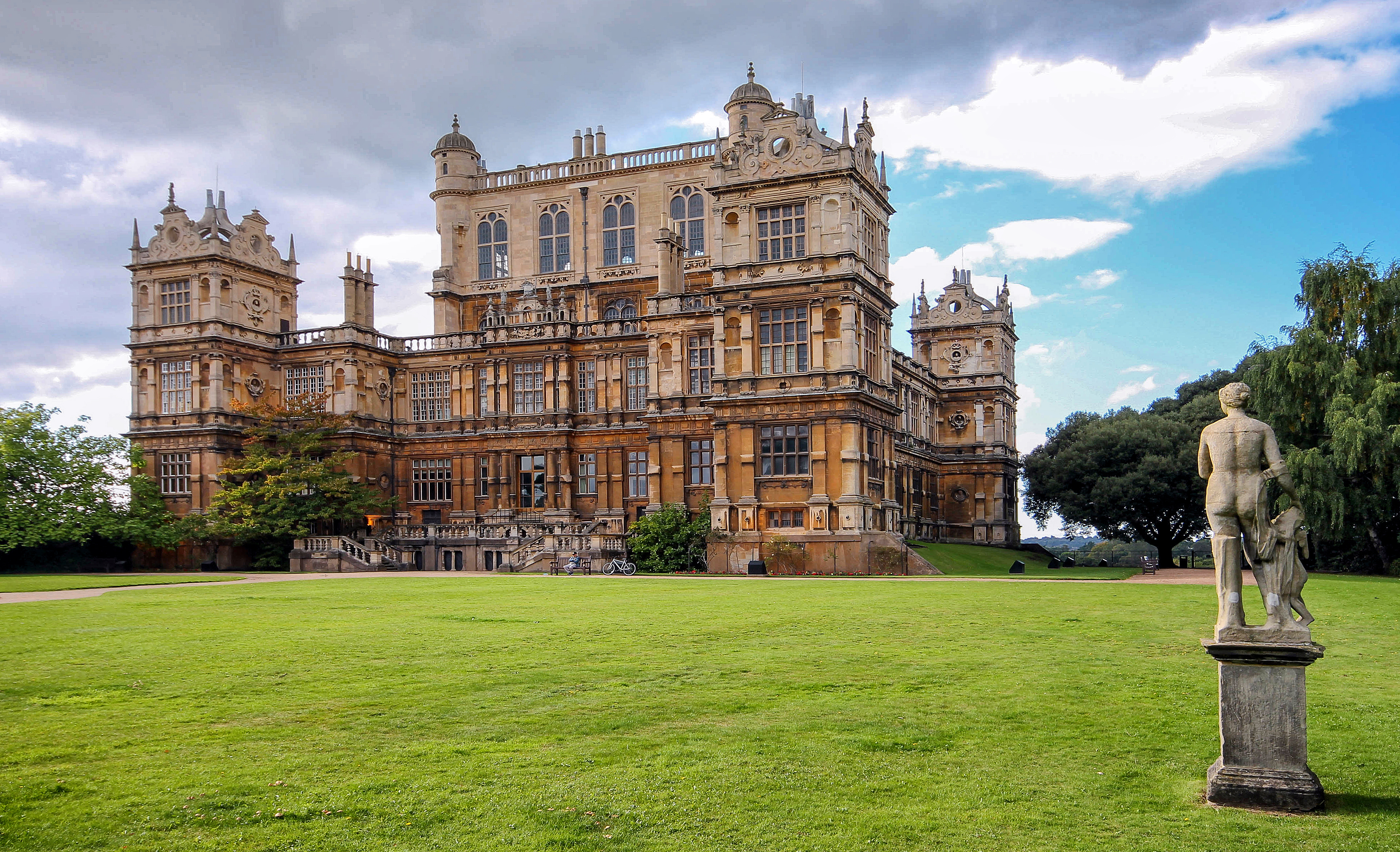
Wollaton Hall

Henry VII (1485–1509)

- Athelhampton House, Dorset (1493–1550)
- Compton Wynyates, Warks. (1481–1515)
- Cotehele, Cornwall (maajor rebuilding c.1485-c.1520)
- Dorney Court, Bucks. (c. 1500)
- Little Moreton Hall, Ches. (1504–62)
- Oxburgh Hall, Norfolk (1482 & seq.)
- Paycocke's House and Garden, Coggeshall, Essex (c. 1500)
- Prysten House, Plymouth, Devon (c. 1490)
- The Tribunal, Glastonbury, Somerset (c. 1500)
- The Vyne, Hampshire (c. 1500–1510)

Henry VIII (1509-47)

- Barrington Court, Somerset (1538–50)
- Chenies Manor House, Bucks. (c. 1530–1550)
- Coughton Court, Warks. (1509–22)
- Cowdray Castle, Sussex (1533–38)
- East Barsham Manor, Norfolk (c. 1520)
- Hall Place, Bexley (1537–1649)
- Haslington Hall, Ches. (1545)
- Helmingham Hall, Suffolk (1510; remodelled)
- Hengrave Hall, Suffolk (1525–1538)
- Kentwell Hall, Suffolk (1540–63)
- Layer Marney Tower, Essex (1520)
- London Charterhouse Great Hall (1545, now an almshouse)
- Rufford Old Hall, Lancs. (1530)
- Speke Hall, Liverpool (1530–98)
- Suffolk Place, Southwark (1522; dem. 1557)
- Sutton House, Hackney (1535)
- Sutton Place, Surrey (c. 1525)
- Thornbury Castle, Glos. (1508–21)

Edward VI and Mary I (1547–58)

- Broughton Castle, Oxon. (remodelled c. 1550)
- Great Hall, Carew Manor, Beddington (c. 1550, though with an earlier hammer-beam roof)
- Great Fosters, Surrey (c. 1550)
- Melford Hall, Suffolk (1554–59)
- Old Somerset House, London (1547–52, dem. 1775)

Elizabethan (1558-1603)

- Barlborough Hall, Derbys. (1583)
- Benthall Hall, Shropshire. (1580)
- Bramall Hall, Manchester (c. 1599)
- Brereton Hall, Ches. (1586)
- Burghley House, Peterborough, Cambs. (1555–87)
- Burton Agnes Hall, E. Yorks. (1601–10, attr. to Robert Smythson)
- Burton Constable Hall, E. Yorks. (c. 1560)
- Carew Castle, Pembrokeshire (remodelling of earlier castle before 1592, now ruined)
- Castle Ashby, Northants. (1574–1635)
- Charlecote Park, Warks. (1558)
- Condover Hall, Salop. (1591–98, attr. to John Thorpe)
- Corsham Court, Wilts. (1582)
- Chequers Court, Bucks. (1565, now the country house of the British Prime Minister)
- Danny House, W Sussex (1593–95)
- Doddington Hall, Lincs. (1593–1600 by Robert Smythson)
- Eastbury Manor House, Dagenham (1566–73)
- Fountains Hall, N. Yorks. (1598–1604)
- Gawthorpe Hall, Lancs. (1600–04, attr. to Robert Smythson)
- Gayhurst House, Bucks. (1597–1603)
- Great Chamber at Gilling Castle, N. Yorks. (1571–75)
- Hall-i’-th’-Wood, Bolton, Manchester (1591–1648)
- Handforth Hall, Ches. (1562)
- Hardwick Hall, Derbys. (1590–97 by Robert Smythson)
- Holdenby Palace, Northants. (1583, dem.)
- Additions by Robert Dudley to Kenilworth Castle, (1563–75; ruined 1649)
- Kirby Hall, Northants. (1570–75; ruins)
- Levens Hall, Cumbria
- Longford Castle, Wilts. (1576–91)
- Longleat, Somerset (1567 by Robert Smythson & al.)
- Loseley Park, Surrey (1562–68)
- Mapledurham House, Mapledurham, Oxon. (c. 1585)
- Montacute House, Somerset (1598 by William Arnold)
- Old Gorhambury House, Herts. (1563–68; ruins)
- Ormonde Castle (also spelt Ormond), Co. Tipperary (1565)
- Parham Park, W. Sussex (1577)
- Pitchford Hall, Shropshire. (c. 1560)
- Plas Mawr, Gwynedd (1576-85)
- Raglan Castle, Gwent (1580s alterations to a 15th century castle, ruined in 1646)
- Rainthorpe Hall, Norfolk (1579–& seq.)
- Sawston Hall, Cambs. (1557–84)
- Shaw House, Newbury, Berks. (1581)
- Stanley Palace, Chester (c. 1591)
- Theobalds Palace, Herts. (1564–85, dem.)
- Trerice, Cornwall (1570–73)
- Wakehurst Place, W Sussex (c. 1590)
- Wilderhope Manor, Shropshire. (c. 1585)
- Wollaton Hall, Nottingham (1580–88 by Robert Smythson)

== Tudor Revival ==
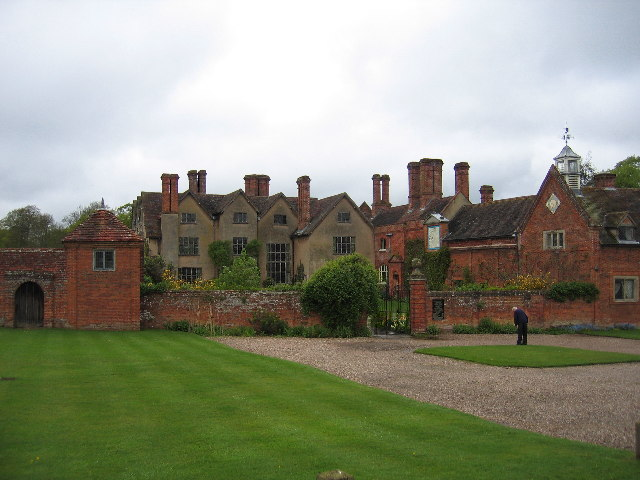
Packwood House, Warwickshire: a genuine Tudor building, much rebuilt in a Neo-Tudor style.

In the 19th century a free mix of late Gothic elements, Tudor, and Elizabethan were combined for public buildings, such as hotels and railway stations, as well as for residences. The popularity continued into the 20th century for residential building. This type of Renaissance Revival architecture is called 'Neo-Tudor,' 'Mock Tudor,' 'Tudor Revival,' 'Elizabethan,' 'Tudorbethan,' and 'Jacobethan.'

Tudor and Elizabethan precedents were the clear inspiration for many 19th and 20th century grand country houses in the United States and the British Commonwealth countries. A 19th and 20th century movement to build revivalist institutional buildings at schools and hospitals often drew from famous Tudor examples to form the Collegiate Gothic architectural style.
