= Francis William Monement =

- Country (sports): GBR
- Born: 2 April 1858; King's Lynn, Norfolk, England
- Died: March 1943; North Walsham, Norfolk, England
- Turned pro: 1880 (amateur tour)
- Retired: 1892

Singles
- Career record: 38–11
- Career titles: 5

Grand Slam singles results
- Wimbledon: 2R (1880)

Francis William Monement (2 April 1858 – March 1943) was an English tennis player from Norfolk active in the late 19th century. He was a competitor at the 1880 Wimbledon Championship where he was defeated in the second round by Otway Woodhouse.

== Career ==
William played his first tournament at the 1880 Wimbledon Championship losing to Otway Woodhouse in straight sets in the second round. In 1881 he won his first title at the Norwich Open against Edward Morgan Hansell. In 1882 he competed at the Prince's Club Championships at Hans Place, London where he lost to Ernest Renshaw in round one. he then won his second singles title at the Norwich Open against Edward Morgan Hansell.

In 1883 he won his second Norwich Open title at Norwich defeating his brother William Bolding Monement in straight sets. In 1884 he won a third title at the Saxmundham Open at Saxmundham against Maurice Welldon. In 1884 he won his fourth singles title at Rainthorpe Hall Open tournament against his brother. The same year he competed at the Eastern Counties Championships at Felixstowe where he won his fifth and final title against Maurice Welldon. In 1892 he played and won his final tournament and title at Baron's Hall, Fakenham, Norfolk.

== Personal life ==
Francis William Monement was a landowner from King's Lynne in Norfolk, England. In 1925 he inherited the Weybourne Estate from his brother William Bolding Monement who was also an amateur tennis player. He died in 1943.
