= Norwich Open =

Defunct tennis tournament
- Event name: Robinson's Barley Water Norwich Open (1972-1975)
- Tour: ILTF
- Sponsor: Britvic PLC (1972-1975)
- Founded: 1881, 1972
- Abolished: 1930, 1982
- Location: Norwich, Norfolk, England.
- Venue: Bowling Green, Chapelfield Gardens; Anglia Lawn Tennis Center
- Surface: Grass - outdoor Clay - outdoor

The Norwich Open was a men's and women's grass court tennis tournament first founded in 1881 as the Norwich Open Lawn Tennis Tournament. The original tournament was played on grass courts laid out on the bowling green at Chapelfield Gardens in Norwich, Norfolk, England. That tournament ran annually until 1930 before it was ended. In 1972 a second Norwich Open was revived that was held at the Anglia Lawn Tennis Center, Norwich, and was played on clay courts. That tournament continued to 1982 before it was abolished.

== History ==
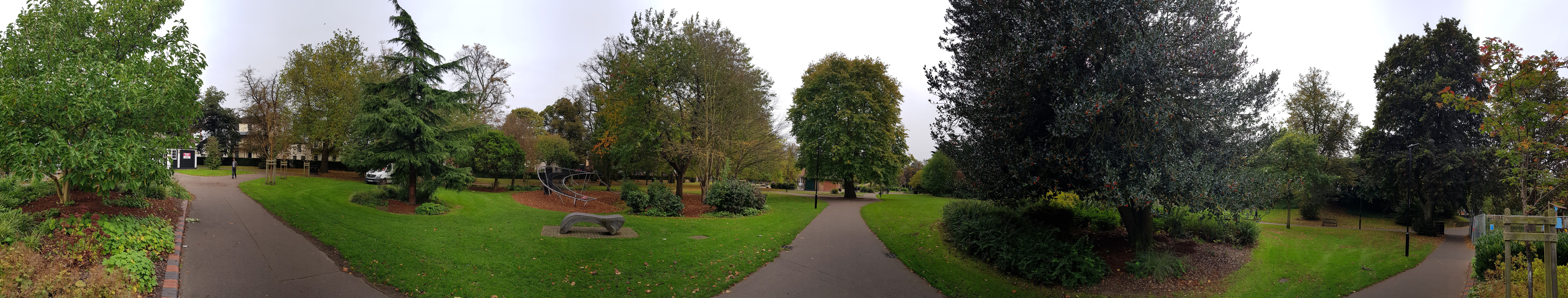
Chapelfield Gardens was the location of the first Norwich Open tournament in 2020

Norwich Open Lawn Tennis Tournament was a grass court tennis tournament that was open to both men's and women's players founded in 1881. At the inaugural tournament that was held from 9 to 13 September that year, the men's singles being won by a Mr. Francis William Monement. The women's singles event was won by a Miss M. Raikes. In 1883 the third edition of this tournament was played from 22 to 27 August, the men's singles event was again won by Mr. Francis William Monement, who defeated his brother Mr. William Bolding Monement. The first tournament continued to be held through to 1930 when it was discontinued. In 1972 a second Norwich Open was reestablished under the brand name the Robinson's Barley Water Norwich Open. That event was staged at the Anglia Lawn Tennis Center, and was played on clay courts. The second tournament was staged through until 1982 when it was discontinued.

== Sources ==
- Routledges Sporting Annual (1882) George Routledge and Son. London.
- The Illustrated London News. (1974) No. 262. London: Illustrated London News & Sketch Limited.
