= Rainthorpe Hall =

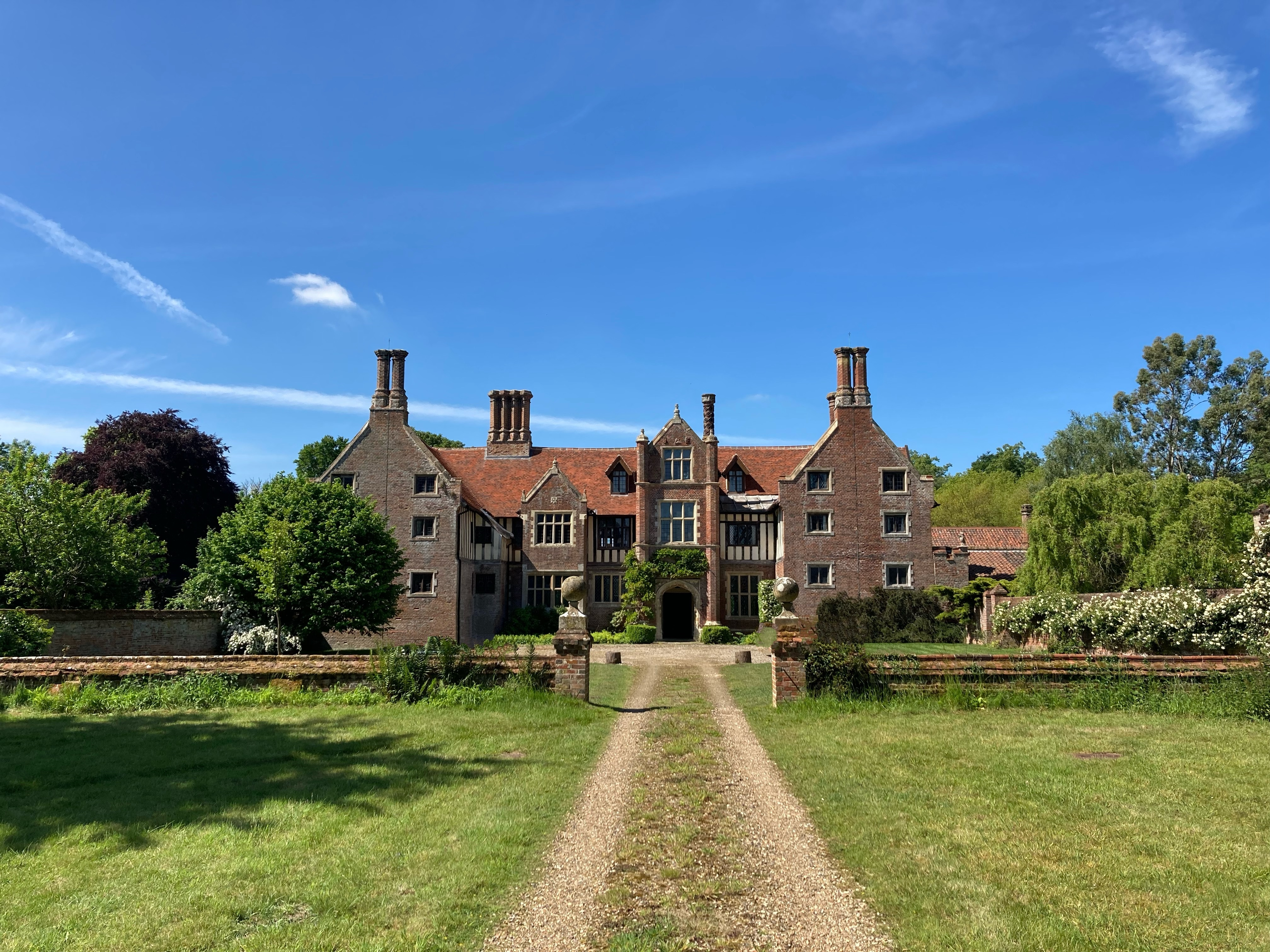
- The front elevation of Rainthorpe Hall

- Location within Norfolk

General information
- Type: Private house; stately home
- Architectural style: Tudor
- Coordinates: 52.527851°N 1.245525°E

Listed Building – Grade I
- Official name: Rainthorpe Hall including garden wall with gate and gatepiers
- Designated: 2 October 1951
- Reference no.: 1050699

National Register of Historic Parks and Gardens
- Official name: Rainthorpe Hall
- Designated: 18 September 1987
- Reference no.: 1000292
- Grade: II

Rainthorpe Hall is a Grade I listed Elizabethan country mansion and estate near Tasburgh in Norfolk, England, about 8 miles (13 km) south of Norwich.

The property is notable for its medieval stonework, wood carvings, rare 17th-century leather wall-coverings, 19th-century Victorian mirrors and extensive collection of stained glass dating back to the 13th century. The estate grounds extend to around 50 acres.

== History of Rainthorpe Hall ==
The settlement of Rainthorpe (Rainestorp) is first recorded in Domesday Book under the tenancy of Roger de Rames. It was then a hamlet with a population of 9 households.

There is evidence that the Hall dates back to the 15th century or earlier in some form and that most of the original structure was destroyed by a fire around 1500. The current hall dates back to 1503. In 1579, the lawyer Thomas Baxter purchased the property and set about adding to it and altering it to include two new wings to form the E-shape characteristic of Elizabethan houses of this type, before selling the property in 1628.

There is evidence that Civil War soldiers of the Parliamentary armies were billeted at Rainthorpe, thanks to a carving on the right hand stone pillar of the porch. The initials and date 'R.M. 1641' are inscribed with great care into the stone. It is likely that the stone-floored hall beyond was used for stabling their horses. 1641 was the year before the formation of Cromwell's 'New Model Army' and R.M. is likely to have been a member of the local militia. A relic of the Middle Ages is the nuttery, parallel to the east wall of the garden, coppiced stools of hazel, which, cut on a regular 7 year rota, would provide fencing stakes, tool handles, kindling and other small necessities.

The Hall was acquired in 1852 by the Honourable Frederick Walpole, youngest son of Horatio Walpole, 3rd Earl of Orford; his influence on the house can be seen in the hall chimney, stone windows, wood carvings and stained glass.

Colonel Sir Charles Harvey, who later became the 2nd Baronet Harvey, bought Rainthorpe Hall in 1878 and the following year constructed the stable block and the castellated gardener's cottage which sits to the right of the property. Harvey added the five bay window extension at the front in 1885 and also constructed a theatre adjacent to the property. During this period, Sir Charles also bought several farms and a number of cottages in nearby villages, expanding the estate to around 1,200 acres. He also paid for extensive restoration work to the property and allowed the theatre at Rainthorpe Hall to be used for concerts and plays by Tasburgh village school.

After this, Rainthorpe Hall was purchased by American paper heiress Rosemary Crane Hastings and her British husband the architectural historian J Maurice Hastings, who, according to his good friend, Maurice Bowra, held "wild parties" at the Hall. The Hall was subsequently inherited by his son, George Hastings, who died in 1992. His children sold it to the barrister and businessman Alastair Wilson QC in 1993. The hall was again sold in 2019 and remains in private ownership.
