= 1879 men's tennis season =

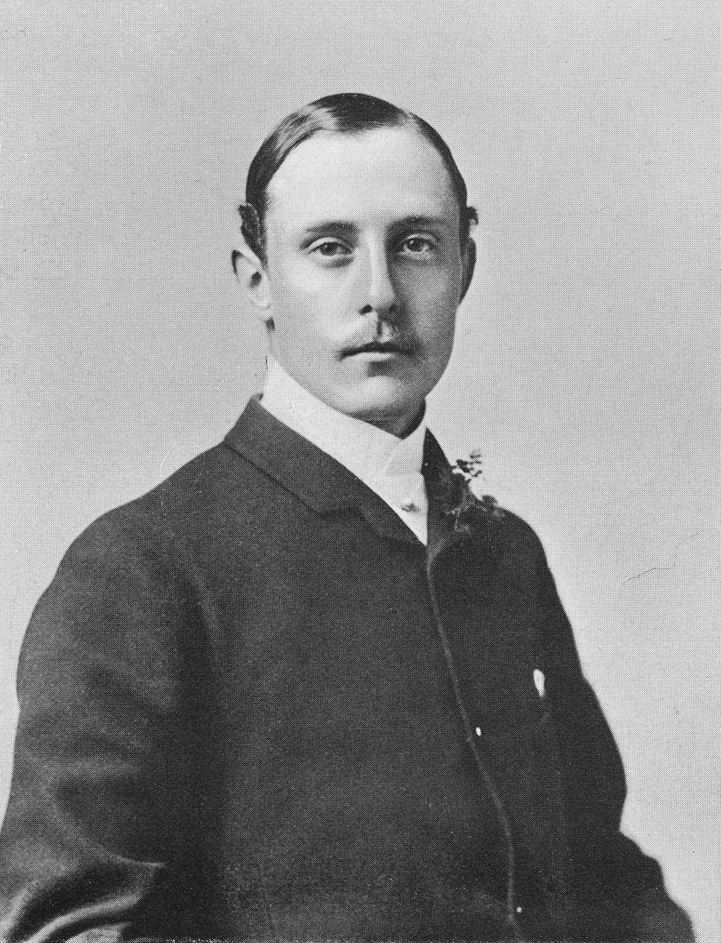
- William Renshaw wins first hardcourt title this year

Details
- Duration: 2 June – 28 December
- Tournaments: 26 (Amateur)
- Categories: Important (2); National (1); Provincial/State/Regional (3); County (4); Local/other (16)

Achievements (singles)
- Most titles: (Ireland) Vere St. Leger Goold (3)
- Most finals: (Ireland) Vere St. Leger Goold (5)

The 1879 men's tennis season incorporated 26 tournaments. The 1879 Wimbledon Championships was won by John Hartley. Defending champion Patrick Francis Hadow could not participate in the Challenge Round. This year saw the inaugural Irish Championships that in its early stages of development was considered as important as the Wimbledon Championships. The event was won by Vere St. Leger Goold who defeated Charles David Barry in the final by 8–6, 8–6. Important this year was the staging of six hard court tournaments some of which included the Dublin University Championships the East Gloucestershire Championships held in Cheltenham Great Britain, Nice Tennis Tournament in Nice, France and the first tournament to be held outside of Europe in Australia with the Victorian Championships.

The season started in Nice, France in May and ended in Melbourne, Australia in December.

== Calendar ==
Notes 1: Challenge Round: the final round of a tournament, in which the winner of a single-elimination phase faces the previous year's champion, who plays only that one match. The challenge round was used in the early history of tennis (from 1877 through 1921), in some tournaments not all.

* Indicates challenger

Notes 2:Tournaments in italics were events that were staged only once that season

Key

Important.
National
Provincial/State/Regional
County
Local/other

=== January to April ===
No events

=== February ===
Date	Tournament	Winner	Finalist	Semifinalist	Quarter finalist
14 - 15 May.	Nice Tennis Tournament; St. Philippe Rink; Nice, France; Hard; Singles - Doubles	(Ireland) Henry Lyle Mulholland; 6-3, 6-1	(United Kingdom) Mr. Harrison		

=== May ===
Date	Tournament	Winner	Finalist	Semifinalist	Quarter finalist
28 April - 2 May.	Earlsfort Terrace Tournament; Earlsfort Terrace, Dublin, Ireland; Asphalt	(Ireland) Vere Thomas Saint Leger Goold ?	(Ireland) J.C. Roberts		
14 - 15 May.	Bournemouth CLTC Spring Tournament; Bournemouth CLTC; Dean Park Cricket Ground; Bournemouth, England; Grass; Singles - Doubles	(United Kingdom) Sir Hubert James Medlycott ?	?		

=== June ===
Week	Tournament	Winner	Finalist	Semifinalist	Quarter finalist
16 June	Irish Lawn Tennis Championships; Dublin, Ireland; Grass; Singles	(Ireland) Vere St. Leger Goold; 8–6, 8–6	(United Kingdom) David Charles Barry	(United Kingdom) Henry Evelyn Toombe (Ireland) John Jameson Cairnes	(Ireland) F J Joyce (Ireland) J J Sherrard (Ireland) L McDonnell (Ireland) A Hodgson
30 Jun -30 Jul	Grand National Lawn Tennis Tournament; Hendon, London, Great Britain; Grass; Singles	(United Kingdom) Edgar Lubbock; 6-1 6-0 8-6	(Scotland) Lestocq Robert Erskine		

=== July ===
Date	Tournament	Winner	All comers' finalist	Semifinalist	Quarterfinalist
7–16 July	Wimbledon Championship; London, Great Britain; Grass; Singles	(United Kingdom) John Hartley walkover	(Ireland) Vere St. Leger Goold	(Ireland) Vere St. Leger Goold; Bye (United Kingdom) Cecil Francis Parr	(United Kingdom) Charles Gilbert Heathcote (Ireland) C D Barry (United Kingdom) G E Tabor
7–16 July	Wimbledon Championship; London, Great Britain; Grass; Singles	Challenge round (United Kingdom) Patrick Francis Hadow		(Ireland) Vere St. Leger Goold; Bye (United Kingdom) Cecil Francis Parr	(United Kingdom) Charles Gilbert Heathcote (Ireland) C D Barry (United Kingdom) G E Tabor
14-15 July.	Staffordshire County Cricket Club Lawn Tennis Tournament. Lichfield, Great Britain; Grass; Singles	(United Kingdom) Henry W. J. Gardner; 6-4 6-3	(United Kingdom) E. W. Burnett	(United Kingdom) William Arthur Briscoe (United Kingdom) J.H. Lonsdale	(United Kingdom) N. Bailey (United Kingdom) J.C. Keene (United Kingdom) W.W. Jacks
14-15 July	Essex County Cricket Club Tournament; Knighton, Essex, Great Britain; Grass; Singles	(United Kingdom); Nalton Womersley; 6-4 6-5	(United Kingdom); Dale Womersley		

=== August ===
Date	Tournament	Winner	Finalist	Semifinalist	Quarter finalist
August	Scottish Championships; St Andrews, Great Britain; Grass; Singles	(Scotland) Leslie Balfour-Melville def	?		
27 July- 2 August.	County Kildare Tournament; Naas Military Barracks; Naas, County Kildare, Ireland; Grass -	(Scotland) Algernon Ambrose Michael Aylmer; 4-6, 6-3, 6-2.	(Ireland) James G. Kennedy		
29 July - 2 August.	County Kildare Closed Tournament; Naas Military Barracks; Naas, County Kildare, Ireland; Grass -	(United Kingdom) George Edward Devere Kennedy; 6-4, 6-5	(Scotland) H. Mitchell		
6 - 8 August.	County Galway LTC Tournament; County Galway Lawn Tennis Club; Lisbeg, County Galway, Ireland; Grass -	(Ireland) W.G. Eyre ?	(Ireland) W. Peebles		
12 - 13 August.	Armagh Lawn Tennis Tournament; Archery Lawn Tennis Club; Armagh, Ireland; Grass; Singles - Doubles	(Ireland) F.L. Cope ?	(Ireland) Robert Shaw Templer		
15–16 August	Dorchester Kingston Park Tournament; Kingston Park CLTC; Kingston Park, Kingston Maurward House, Dorchester, Dorset, England; Grass; Singles	(England) Montague Hankey; 6-5 6-5 6-5	(United Kingdom) Captain James J. Glascott	(United Kingdom) Captain James J. Glascott (United Kingdom) James H. Medlycott	(United Kingdom) Captain Bradford (England) James C. Pipon (United Kingdom)
22–25 August	Waterford Tournament; Waterford, Ireland; Grass; Singles	(Ireland) Vere St. Leger Goold ?	(Ireland) J. M. Brown	(Ireland) Henry Joseph Gallwey (Ireland) J. C. Roberts	(Ireland) Patrick Joseph Gallwey (Ireland) William Joseph Gallwey (Ireland) Pierce Barron-Newell

=== September ===
Date	Tournament	Winner	Finalist	Semifinalist	Quarter finalist
2 September.	Teifiside LTC Championship; Teifiside Lawn Tennis Club; Newcastle Emlyn, Wales; Grass; Singles - Doubles	(United Kingdom) Gwyn Saunders Davies ?	(United Kingdom) Frank Miles		
3–9 September	South of Ireland Championships Limerick, Ireland; Grass; Singles	(Ireland) Joseph Fritz James Heffernan Considine; 6–4, 6–3	(Ireland) Henry Evelyn Tombe	(Ireland) Joseph Fritz James Heffernan Considine (Ireland) T. J. Johnston	(Ireland) Major Richard de Ros Rose (Ireland) W. Ryan (Ireland) Charles R B Heaton-Armstrong
3–9 September	South of Ireland Championships Limerick, Ireland; Grass; Singles	(Ireland) Henry Evelyn Tombe (Ireland) Mrs. R B Heaton-Armstrong; 6-3, 6-5, 6-2	(Ireland) Mr. Baker (Ireland) Miss Annie Rice	(Ireland) Joseph Fritz James Heffernan Considine (Ireland) T. J. Johnston	(Ireland) Major Richard de Ros Rose (Ireland) W. Ryan (Ireland) Charles R B Heaton-Armstrong
2 - 5 September.	Yare LTC Tournament; Yare Lawn Tennis Club; Fritton, Great Yarmouth; Surface ? Singles - Doubles	(United Kingdom) Percy Lucas ?	(United Kingdom) Julian Marshall		
23 September.	North of Ireland Championships; Ormeau Cricket Ground; Belfast, Northern Ireland; Grass; Singles - Doubles	(United Kingdom) Captain Short; 6-5, 4-6, 6-3	(United Kingdom) M. Short		

=== October ===
Date	Tournament	Winner	Finalist	Semifinalist	Quarter finalist
30 September - 4 October.	Bournemouth CLTC Autumn Tournament; Bournemouth CLTC; Dean Park Cricket Ground; Bournemouth, England; Grass; Singles - Doubles	(United Kingdom) Edmond Bennet Brackenbury ?	(United Kingdom) Sir Hubert James Medlycott		
7–11 October.	East Gloucestershire Championships; Cheltenham, Great Britain; Hard (Asphalt); Singles	(United Kingdom) William Renshaw; 6-4 6-3 5-6 6-4	(Ireland) Vere St. Leger Goold	(United Kingdom) William H J Gardner	(United Kingdom) E. W. Burnett (United Kingdom) E. Manning (United Kingdom) Mr. Arnold
20–23 October.	Dublin University Championships; Singles - Doubles	(Ireland) Henry James Daly ?	(Ireland) Ernest Edward Knox	(Ireland) Charles William O’Hara Mease (Ireland) Henry James Daly	(Ireland) Charles William O’Hara Mease (Ireland) Thomas Haines Abrahall (Ireland) G.H. Bailey

=== November ===
No events

=== December ===
Date	Tournament	Winner	Finalist	Semifinalist	Quarter finalist
22–28 December	Victorian Championships; Melbourne, Victoria, Australia; Hard (Asphalt); Singles	(Australia) A. F. Robinson; 2-1 (sets)	(Australia) H. M. Strachan	| (Australia) E. McKenzie (Australia) W. Officer ?	

== Event staged date unknown ==
Date	Tournament	Winner	Finalist	Semifinalist	Quarter finalist
?.	Choceň Tournament; Choceň, Bohemia; Grass -	? ?	?		

== Tournament winners ==
Note: major tournaments in bold

- (Ireland) Vere St. Leger Goold—**Irish Championships**, Dublin II (Earlsfort), Waterford, (3)
- (Ireland) Henry James Daley, Dublin III, (1)
- (Australia) A. F. Robinson, Melbourne, (1)
- (Scotland) Algernon Ambrose Michael Aylmer, Naas I, (1)
- (United Kingdom) Captain Short, Belfast, (1)
- (United Kingdom) Dale Womersley, Knighton, (1)
- (United Kingdom) Edgar Lubbock, Hendon, (1)
- (United Kingdom) Edmond Bennet Brackenbury, Bournemouth II, (1)
- (Ireland) F.L. Cope, Armagh, (1)
- (United Kingdom) George Edward Devere Kennedy, [Naas II,(1)
- (United Kingdom) Gwyn Saunders Davies, Newcastle Emlyn, (1)
- (United Kingdom) Henry W. J. Gardner, Stafford, (1)
- (Ireland) Henry Lyle Mulholland, Nice, (1)
- (United Kingdom) John Hartley, **Wimbledon Championships**, (1)
- (Ireland) Joseph F. J. H. Considine, Limerick, (1)
- (Scotland) Leslie Balfour-Melville, St Andrews, (1)
- (England) Montague Hankey, Dorchester, (1)
- (United Kingdom) Percy Lucas, Great Yarmouth, (1)
- (England) William Renshaw, Cheltenham, (1)
- (United Kingdom) Hubert James Medlycott Bournemouth I, (1)
- (Ireland) W.G. Eyre, Lisbeg (1)

== See also ==
- 1879 in sports

== Sources ==
- A Social History of Tennis in Britain: Lake, Robert J. (2014), Volume 5 of Routledge Research in Sports History. Routledge, UK, ISBN 9781134445578.
- Ayre's Lawn Tennis Almanack And Tournament Guide, 1908 to 1938, A. Wallis Myers.
- British Lawn Tennis and Squash Magazine, 1948 to 1967, British Lawn Tennis Ltd, UK.
- Dunlop Lawn Tennis Almanack And Tournament Guide, G.P. Hughes, 1939 to 1958, Dunlop Sports Co. Ltd, UK
- Fein, Paul (2003). Tennis confidential : today's greatest players, matches, and controversies. Washington, D.C.: Potomac Books. ISBN 978-1574885262.
- Lawn tennis and Badminton Magazine, 1906 to 1973, UK.
- Lowe's Lawn Tennis Annuals and Compendia, Lowe, Sir F. Gordon, Eyre & Spottiswoode
- Spalding's Lawn Tennis Annuals from 1885 to 1922, American Sports Pub. Co, USA.
- Sports Around the World: History, Culture, and Practice, Nauright John and Parrish Charles, (2012), ABC-CLIO, Santa Barbara, Cal, US, ISBN 1598843001.
- The Concise History of Tennis, Mazak Karoly, (2010), 6th Edition, 2015.
- Tennis; A Cultural History, Gillmeister Heiner, (1997), Leicester University Press, Leicester, UK.
- The Tennis Book, edited by Michael Bartlett and Bob Gillen, Arbor House, New York, 1981 ISBN 0-87795-344-9
- The World of Tennis Annuals, Barrett John, 1970 to 2001.
- Total Tennis:The Ultimate Tennis Encyclopedia, by Bud Collins, Sport Classic Books, Toronto, Canada, ISBN 0-9731443-4-3
- Wright & Ditson Officially Adopted Lawn Tennis Guide's 1890 to 1920 Wright & Ditsons Publishers, Boston, Mass, USA.
- http://www.tennisarchives.com/
- https://thetennisbase.com/
