= Womersley (surname) =

Womersley is a surname. Notable people with the surname include:

- Cecilia Womersley (born 1943), alpine skier from New Zealand
- Chris Womersley (born 1968), Australian author of crime fiction, short stories and poetry
- Chris Womersley (alpine skier) (born 1949), alpine skier from New Zealand
- Dale Womersley (tennis) (1860–1942), British tennis player
- Dale Womersley (cricketer) (1891–1971), English cricketer.
- Ernest Womersley (born 1932), English football player
- Gary Womersley (living), Scottish National Party politician
- Herbert Womersley (1889–1962), English entomologist and acarologist
- Hugh Bryan Spencer Womersley (born 1922), Australian botanist
- John Womersley (1896–1962), World War I flying ace
- J. L. Womersley (1910–1990), Sheffield City architect
- John R. Womersley (1907–1958), British mathematician
- Nalton Womersley (1859–1930), British tennis player
- Peter Womersley (1923–1993), British architect
- Rebecca Womersley (born 1993), English racing cyclist
- Sir Walter Womersley, 1st Baronet (1878–1961), British Conservative Party politician

== See also ==
- Womersley baronets, a title in the Baronetage of the United Kingdom
- Patteson Womersley Nickalls (1877-1946), a British polo player
