= 1879 women's tennis season =

1879 Women's Tennis season
Details
- Duration: April 1879 – October 1879
- Edition: 4th
- Tournaments: 7
- Categories: National (1); Regional (2); County (1); Regular (3)

Achievements (singles)
- Most titles: (Ireland) May Langrishe (1) (England) Florence Mardall (1) (Ireland) Miss Perry(1) (Ireland) Annie Rice (1) (Ireland) Miss A. Ritchie (1)
- Most finals: (Ireland) May Langrishe (1) (England) Florence Mardall (1) (Ireland) Miss Perry(1) (Ireland) Annie Rice (1) (Ireland) Miss A. Ritchie (1)

The 1879 Women's Tennis season was mainly composed of national, regional, county, local regular amateur tournaments. This year, seven tennis events for women were staged, four of them in Ireland and two events in England between April and October 1879.

== Season summary ==
The women's amateur tennis seasons covers a period of thirty five years from 1876 to 1912. During this period there was no single international organization responsible for overseeing tennis. At the very start in tennis history lawn tennis clubs themselves organized events and some like the All England Lawn Tennis and Croquet Club in England (f.1877) and the Fitzwilliam Lawn Tennis Club, Ireland (f.1879) generally oversaw tennis in their respective countries.

This would later change when tennis players started (those that could) traveled the world to compete in events organized by individual national lawn tennis associations (NLTA)'s the oldest of which then was the United States Lawn Tennis Association (f. 1881). In certain countries that did not establish a national association until later, had provincial, regional or state lawn tennis associations overseeing tournaments in a province, region or state within a country, such as the Northern Lawn Tennis Association in Manchester, England (f.1880), had responsibility for coordinating tournaments staged by clubs in the North of England region. In Australia the Victorian Lawn Tennis Association (f.1904) organised tournaments in the state of Victoria, Australia.

In 1879 seven tournaments for women were staged five of them in Ireland. In the spring the Earlsfort Terrace Tournament held in Dublin, Ireland is played on asphalt courts featuring a ladies singles and doubles event. Between April and May the newly established Oxford University Tennis Championship was held in Oxford, England that included a women's event. In June the Irish Championships are established, this was the first major national championships in the world to feature not only a women's singles event won by a May Langrishe, but also a mixed doubles event. In August the Armagh Tennis Tournament is staged at the Archery Lawn Tennis Club, Armagh that features a mixed doubles event.

In September 1879 the fourth edition of South of Ireland Championships in Limerick the singles event was won by Annie Rice. The same month the first North of Ireland Championships are staged in Belfast the women's singles was won by Miss C. Ritchie. In October 1879 in England the inaugural East Gloucestershire Championships are held at the Imperial Winter Gardens in Cheltenham, this is first significant tournament in England to feature a women's singles event, that is won by Florence Mardall and, also women's doubles event. In Bermuda the Bermuda Open Tennis Championships are held for the first time, at this time 'open' tournaments usually meant men's and women's players can compete.

At the 1879 Wimbledon Championships the world's first major tennis tournament, it still remained an all men's event, no women's events were staged.

In 1913 the International Lawn Tennis Federation was created, that consisted of national member associations. The ILTF through its associated members then became responsible for supervising women's tour events.

== Season results ==
Notes 1: Challenge Round: the final round of a tournament, in which the winner of a single-elimination phase faces the previous year's champion, who plays only that one match. The challenge round was used in the early history of tennis (from 1877 through 1921), in some tournaments not all.

* Indicates doubles ** mixed doubles

Notes 2:Tournaments in italics were events that were staged only once that season

Key

Main events
National events
Provincial/Regional/State events
County events
Regular events

=== January to March ===
No events

=== April to May ===
Note: The Oxford University Tennis Championship were held results unknown.

Ended	Tournament	Winner	Finalist	Semi Finalist	Quarter Finalist
May 2	Oxford University Tennis Championship; Oxford University LTC; Oxford, England; Grass; Singles	?	?		
May 2.	Earlsfort Terrace Tournament; Dublin, Ireland; Outdoor; Asphalt; Singles	(Ireland) Miss Perry def	(Ireland) Miss Costello	(Ireland) May Langrishe (Ireland) Miss Shaw	(Ireland) Miss Casey (Ireland) Miss Lane (Ireland) Miss Scovell

=== June ===
Ended	Tournament	Winner	Finalist	Semi Finalist	Quarter Finalist
Jun 10	Irish Championships; Fitzwilliam Lawn Tennis Club; Dublin, Ireland; Outdoor; Grass; Singles	(Ireland) May Langrishe; 6-2, 0–6, 8-6	(Ireland) D. Meldon	(Ireland) Miss Casey	(Ireland) Connie Butler (Ireland) Adela Langrishe
Jun 10	Irish Championships; Fitzwilliam Lawn Tennis Club; Dublin, Ireland; Outdoor; Grass; Singles	(Ireland) Miss Costello ** (Ireland) E Elliott; 6-4, 6-4	(Ireland) Adela Langrishe (Ireland) Charles D Barry	(Ireland) Miss Casey	(Ireland) Connie Butler (Ireland) Adela Langrishe

=== July ===
No events

=== August ===
Ended	Tournament	Winner	Finalist	Semifinalist	Quarter finalist
Aug 13.	Armagh ALTC Tournament; Archery Lawn Tennis Club; Armagh, Ireland; Grass; Singles - Doubles	(United Kingdom) Miss Cope ** (Ireland) A. J. Wilson ** def	(Ireland) Miss Bayly (Ireland) Robert Shaw Templer		

=== September ===
Ended	Tournament	Winner	Finalist	Semi Finalist	Quarter Finalist
Sep 26.	South of Ireland Championships; Limerick, Ireland; Outdoor; Grass; Singles	(Ireland) Annie Rice; 6–3, 6-4	(Ireland) T. Rice	(Ireland) Miss Grubbe (Ireland) Miss Smith	
Sep 26.	South of Ireland Championships; Limerick, Ireland; Outdoor; Grass; Singles	(Ireland) Mrs Armstrong ** (Ireland) Henry E. Tombe; 7-5, 6-2	(Ireland) Annie Rice (Ireland) Mr Baker	(Ireland) Miss Grubbe (Ireland) Miss Smith	
Sep 30.	North of Ireland Championships; Ormeau Cricket Ground; Belfast, Ireland; Outdoor; Grass; Singles	(Ireland) Miss A. Ritchie; 6–3, 6-4	(Ireland) Miss C. Ritchie		

=== October ===
Ended	Tournament	Winner	Finalist	Semi Finalist	Quarter Finalist
Oct 11	East Gloucestershire Championships; Cheltenham, England; Outdoor; Grass; Singles	(England) Florence Mardall; 6-5, 6–4, 3–6, 3–6, 6-3	(England) Marian Bradley	(England) Mary Abercrombie (England) Ellen Maltby	(England) Clara Hill (England) Ellen Ramsay (England) Miss Shand (England) Miss Willoughby
Oct 11	East Gloucestershire Championships; Cheltenham, England; Outdoor; Grass; Singles	(England) Mary Abercrombie * (England) Marian Bradley; 6-2, 6–3, 6-2	(England) Clara Hill (England) Florence Mardall	(England) Mary Abercrombie (England) Ellen Maltby	(England) Clara Hill (England) Ellen Ramsay (England) Miss Shand (England) Miss Willoughby

=== November to December ===
No events

== Tournament winners ==
=== Singles ===
This is list of winners sorted by number of singles titles (major titles in bold)

- (Ireland) Miss A. Ritchie (1) Belfast
- (England) Florence Mardall (1) Cheltenham
- (Ireland) Miss Perry (1) Dublin II
- (Ireland) May Langrishe (1) Dublin
- (Ireland) Annie Rice (1) Limerick

=== Doubles ===
This is list of winners sorted by number of doubles titles

- (England) Mary Abercrombie & (England) Marian Bradley (1) Cheltenham

=== Mix Doubles ===
This is list of winners sorted by number of doubles titles (major titles in bold)

- (United Kingdom) Miss Cope & (Ireland) A. J. Wilson (1) Armagh
- (Ireland) Miss Costello & (Ireland) E Elliott (1) Dublin
- (Ireland) Mrs Armstrong & (Ireland) Henry E. Tombe (1) Limerick
