= Dale Womersley =

Dale Womersley may refer to:

- Dale Womersley (cricketer)
- Dale Womersley (tennis)
