= 1879 in sports =

1879 in sports describes the year's events in world sport.

== Athletics ==
- USA Outdoor Track and Field Championships

== American football ==
College championship

- College football national championship – Princeton Tigers

Events

- Foundation of Michigan Wolverines

== Association football ==
International

- 5 April — James F. M. Prinsep of Clapham Rovers becomes England's youngest international player at the age of 17 years and 252 when he makes his debut (and only appearance) for England against Scotland. The record stands for more than 123 years until broken by Wayne Rooney in 2003.

England

- FA Cup final – Old Etonians 1–0 Clapham Rovers at The Oval
- Sunderland AFC is founded by a meeting of local schoolteachers and originally called Sunderland & District Teachers AFC. Non–teachers are allowed to play the following year when the club's name is changed to Sunderland AFC.

Scotland

- Scottish Cup final – Vale of Leven win by a walkover after Rangers refuse to appear in the replay due to a protest about a disallowed goal in the original match, drawn 1–1.

Australia

- The Hobart Cricketer's Club play a football match under English Association Rules. The game was a return match for one that was played under Australian (Victorian at the time) Rules.

== Baseball ==
National championship

- National League champions – Providence Grays

Events

- The National League agrees that no one else will hire any of five players listed by each club, the first reserve lists.

== Boxing ==
Events

- John J. Dwyer defeats former champion Jimmy Elliott in 12 rounds at Long Point, Canada, and then claims the Heavyweight Championship of America due to the continued inactivity of current champion Joe Goss and the main challenger Paddy Ryan. His claim is not recognised. Subsequently, Dwyer becomes involved in a bar room brawl with Ryan in New York City.
- John L. Sullivan turns professional and wins his first five known fights.

== Cricket ==
Events

- 2–4 January — Australia defeats England by 10 wickets at Sydney Cricket Ground in the only Test match of the season
- 2 January — Fred Spofforth of Australia claims the first hat-trick in Test cricket
- 25 February — formation of Leicestershire County Cricket Club

England

- Champion County – Lancashire and Nottinghamshire share the title
- Most runs – W. G. Grace 880 @ 35.20 (HS 123)
- Most wickets – Fred Morley 147 @ 10.70 (BB 8–52)

Australia

- Most runs – George Ulyett 306 @ 34.00 (HS 71)
- Most wickets – Tom Emmett 44 @ 11.63 (BB 8–47)

== Golf ==
Major tournaments

- British Open – Jamie Anderson

== Horse racing ==
England

- Grand National – The Liberator
- 1,000 Guineas Stakes – Wheel of Fortune
- 2,000 Guineas Stakes – Charibert
- The Derby – Sir Bevys
- The Oaks – Wheel of Fortune
- St. Leger Stakes – Rayon d'Or

Australia

- Melbourne Cup – Darriwell

Canada

- Queen's Plate – Moss Rose

Ireland

- Irish Grand National – Jupiter Tonans
- Irish Derby Stakes – Soulouque

USA

- Kentucky Derby – Lord Murphy
- Preakness Stakes – Harold
- Belmont Stakes – Spendthrift

== Hurling ==
Events

- The Irish Hurling Union formalises the sport for the first time.

== Lacrosse ==
Events

- The U.S. Amateur Lacrosse Association is formed and adopts the Canadian rules.

== Rowing ==
The Boat Race

- 5 April — Cambridge wins the 36th Oxford and Cambridge Boat Race

== Rugby football ==
Events

- Foundation of Bramley, Rosslyn Park F.C. and Warrington

== Tennis ==
England

- Wimbledon Men's Singles Championship – John Hartley (GB) defeated Vere St. Leger Goold (GB) 6–2, 6–4, 6–2

World

- The 3rd pre-open era 1879 Men's Tennis tour gets underway 12 tournaments are staged this year between 2 June – 28 December 1879.
