= 1879 Grand National =

English steeplechase horse race

- Grand National
- Location: Aintree
- Date: 28 March 1879
- Winning horse: (Republic of Ireland) The Liberator
- Starting price: 5/1
- Jockey: Mr Garrett Moore
- Trainer: J. Moore
- Owner: Garrett Moore
- Conditions: Good to soft

The 1879 Grand National was the 41st renewal of the Grand National horse race that took place at Aintree near Liverpool, England, on 28 March 1879.

== Finishing Order ==
Position	Name	Jockey	Handicap (st-lb)	SP	Distance
01	The Liberator	Garry Moore	11-4	5-1	10 Lengths
02	Jackal	John Jones	11-0	1000-65	1 Length
03	Martha	Tommy Beasley	10-13	50-1	
04	Wild Monarch	Henry Andrews	11-7	20-1	
05	Bob Ridley	Ted Wilson	10-9	?	
06	Regal	James Jewitt	11-10	5-2	
07	Rossanmore	M. Toole	10-7	50-1	
08	Lord Marcus	William Beasley	10-9	?	
09	Turco	Harry Beasley	10-9	100-6	
10	Brigand	Count Metternich	10-10	50-1	Last to complete

== Non-finishers ==
Fence	Name	Jockey	Handicap (st-lb)	SP	Fate
?	Queen of Kildare	P. Doucie	11-5	40-1	Fell
01	Bacchus	Joe Cannon	11-1	10-1	Fell
01	His Lordship	George Levett	10-12	?	Refused
06	Marshal Niel	P. Gavin	10-12	100-8	Fell
07	Victor II	Johnny Beasley	10-12	100-8	Pulled Up
01	Bellringer	Arthur Coventry	10-7	100-6	Fell
01	The Bear	Richard Marsh	10-7	10-1	Refused
?	Concha	Willie Morris	10-2	50-1	Pulled Up
