= Essex County Cricket Club Open =

Defunct tennis tournament
- Event name: Essex County Cricket Club Tournament
- Tour: Pre open era
- Founded: 1879
- Abolished: 1889
- Editions: 10
- Location: Leyton, Essex; Great Britain
- Venue: Various

The Essex County Cricket Club Open was an early men's and women's grass court tennis tournament held initially at Knighton, Essex in England in 1879 and finally at Leyton in 1888.

== History ==
The Essex County Cricket Club Tennis Tournament was an early grass court tennis tournament held initially at Knighton in England in 1879. It was part of the men's tennis tour. In 1887 the tournament was held in Leyton. In 1888 the event was staged in Chingford. In 1889 it returned to Leyton for the last time before being abolished.

== Finals ==
The challenge round is the final round of a tournament, in which the winner of a single-elimination phase faces the previous year's champion (who plays only that one match). The challenge round was used in the early history of tennis (from 1877 through 1921), but only in some tournaments (not all).

=== Men's singles ===
Included:

Year	Winners	Runners-up	Score
1879 (Note: 1879 edition held from 19–26 July)	(United Kingdom of Great Britain and Ireland) Nalton Womersley	(United Kingdom of Great Britain and Ireland) Dale Womersley	6-4, 6-5
1880 (Note: 1880 edition ended 26 June)	(United Kingdom of Great Britain and Ireland) Dale Womersley	(United Kingdom of Great Britain and Ireland) R.C. Ball	2 sets to 0.
1887 (Note: 1887 edition held from 25–39 July)	(United Kingdom of Great Britain and Ireland) Ernest Meers	(United Kingdom of Great Britain and Ireland) Alfred E. Walker	6-2, 6-4, 6-0
1888 (Note: 1888 edition held from 12–17 September)	(United Kingdom of Great Britain and Ireland) Ernest Meers	(United Kingdom of Great Britain and Ireland) Edward Henry Christy	6-1, 6-0
1889 (Note: 1889 edition held from 26–31 August it also included a challenge round with the right to play Meers as the defending champion the playoff final E. H. Christy and W.H. Edmunds)	(United Kingdom of Great Britain and Ireland) Edward Henry Christy	(United Kingdom of Great Britain and Ireland) Ernest Meers	w.o.

=== Women's singles ===
Year	Champions	Runners-up	Score
1887 (Note: 1887 edition held from 25–39 July)	(England) Brenda James	(England) May Jacks	6-8, 6-0, 6-3.

== Sources ==
- Abolition of Challenge Rounds". paperspast.natlib.govt.nz. EVENING POST, VOLUME CIII, ISSUE 65, 20 MARCH 1922.
- Nieuwland, Alex (2017). "Tournament – Essex County Cricket Club". www.tennisarchives.com. Harlingen, Netherlands: Idzznew BV
- Baily's Monthly Magazine of Sports and Pastimes, and Racing Register, A.H. Baily & Company of Cornhill. London. England. 1860 to 1889.
