= Essex Championships =

Defunct tennis tournament
- Event name: Essex Championships
- Tour: ILTF Circuit (1913-1983)
- Founded: 1881
- Abolished: 1983
- Editions: 85
- Location: Brentwood (1881-84); Leyton (1887, 1890); Chingford (1888-1889, 1892-1893); Colchester (1891, 1894-1914); Frinton-on-Sea (1919, 1946-1983); Southend-on-Sea (1920-1922); Westcliff-on-Sea (1923-1937)
- Venue: Various

The Essex Championships also known as the Essex County Lawn Tennis Championships or Essex Grass Court Championships was a combined men's and women's grass court tennis tournament established in 1881 at Brentwood, Essex. In 1946 it was moved to the Frinton Lawn Tennis Club, Frinton-on-Sea, Essex, Great Britain until 1983 when it was discontinued.

== History ==
The Essex Championships were established in 1881 at Brentwood Essex, England and continued to be staged there until 1884. In 1887 the event was then staged Leyton. It changed location again in 1888 and was held in Chingford till 1889. It switched back to Leyton, Essex for one year only in 1890. From 1891 it moved to the Cambridge Grounds, Colchester where it remained until 1918. Staged briefly at Frinton-on-Sea in 1919 it then moved to Southend-on-Sea until 1922. In 1923 the championships were held at Westcliff-on-Sea till 1946. The championships returned to Frinton-on-Sea and stayed there till the tournament was abolished after eighty five editions in 1983. The event featured both men's and women's singles, doubles and mixed doubles competitions.

== Finals ==
Notes: Challenge round: The final round of a tournament, in which the winner of a single-elimination phase faces the previous year's champion, who plays only that one match. The challenge round was used in the early history of tennis (from 1877 through 1921) in some tournaments not all.

=== Men's singles ===
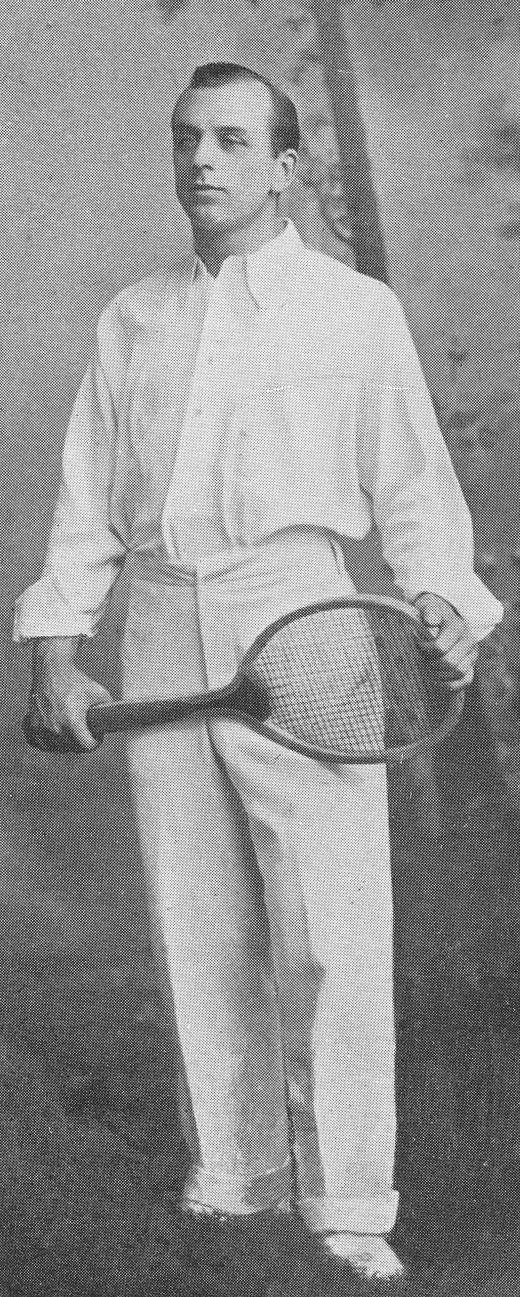
Herbert Roper Barrett won 13 men's singles titles.

Included:

(Incomplete roll)

Year	Champion	Runner up	Score
1881 (Note: 1881 edition held in Brentwood)	(United Kingdom of Great Britain and Ireland) Dale Womersley	(United Kingdom of Great Britain and Ireland) Nalton Womersley	6-0 6-4
1882 (Note: 1882 edition held in Brentwood)	(United Kingdom of Great Britain and Ireland) Charles Walder Grinstead	(United Kingdom of Great Britain and Ireland) Nalton Womersley	6-2 6-3
1883 (Note: 1883 edition held in Brentwood)	(United Kingdom of Great Britain and Ireland) Charles Walder Grinstead (2)	(United Kingdom of Great Britain and Ireland) P. Colley	6-1 6-3 6-4
1884 (Note: 1884 edition held in Brentwood)	(United Kingdom of Great Britain and Ireland) Charles Walder Grinstead (3)	(United Kingdom of Great Britain and Ireland) E. N. Cubitt.	6-0 6-4
1887 (Note: 1887 edition held in Leyton)	(United Kingdom of Great Britain and Ireland) Ernest George Meers	(United Kingdom of Great Britain and Ireland) P. M. Evans	6-0 6-1 6-1
1888 (Note: 1888 edition held in held in Chingford)	(United Kingdom of Great Britain and Ireland) Charles Gladstone Eames	(United Kingdom of Great Britain and Ireland) F. O' Shaughnessy Belli Reade	6–3, 6–2
1889 (Note: 1889 edition held in held in Chingford)	(United Kingdom of Great Britain and Ireland) E. H. Christy	(United Kingdom of Great Britain and Ireland) A. R. Stephenson	w/o
1890 (Note: 1890 edition held in Leyton)	(United Kingdom of Great Britain and Ireland) Ernest George Meers (2)	(United Kingdom of Great Britain and Ireland) Edward Henry Christy	10-12 2-6 6-2 6-3 6-3
1891 (Note: 1891 to 1918 editions held in Chingford, Cambridge Road Ground)	(United Kingdom of Great Britain and Ireland) Arthur Gore	(United Kingdom of Great Britain and Ireland) Charles Gladstone Eames	12–10, 6–2, 2–6, 3–6, 3–6
1892	(United Kingdom of Great Britain and Ireland) H.Knox	(United Kingdom of Great Britain and Ireland) Cecil E. Owen.	4-6 6-3 6-3
1893	(United Kingdom of Great Britain and Ireland) Herbert Ramon Yglesias	(United Kingdom of Great Britain and Ireland) J. A. E. Hickson	8-6 6-2
1894	(United Kingdom of Great Britain and Ireland) Herbert Ramon Yglesias (2)	(United Kingdom of Great Britain and Ireland) Rupert L. Hamblin-Smith	7-5 6-3
1895	(United Kingdom of Great Britain and Ireland) Reginald Doherty	(United Kingdom of Great Britain and Ireland) Herbert Ramon Yglesias	6-3 6-1 6-0
1896	(United Kingdom of Great Britain and Ireland) Reginald Doherty(2)	(United Kingdom of Great Britain and Ireland) Roy Allen	6-4 6-2 7-5
1897	(United Kingdom of Great Britain and Ireland) Herbert Roper Barrett	(United Kingdom of Great Britain and Ireland) C. B. Sharpe	6-1 3-0 RET
1898	(United Kingdom of Great Britain and Ireland) Herbert Roper Barrett (2)	(United Kingdom of Great Britain and Ireland) R. W. Wallace	7-5 6-2
1899	(United Kingdom of Great Britain and Ireland) Herbert Roper Barrett (3)	(United Kingdom of Great Britain and Ireland) A, H, Green	6-1 6-3
1900	(United Kingdom of Great Britain and Ireland) Roy Allen	(United Kingdom of Great Britain and Ireland) Laurence Joseph Petre	6-2 6-3
1901	(United Kingdom of Great Britain and Ireland) Herbert Roper Barrett (4)	(United Kingdom of Great Britain and Ireland) Roy Allen	6-2 6-3
1902	(United Kingdom of Great Britain and Ireland) Herbert Roper Barrett (5)	(New Zealand) Harry A. Parker	6-3 6-1
1903	(United Kingdom of Great Britain and Ireland) Herbert Roper Barrett (6)	(United Kingdom of Great Britain and Ireland) Roy Allen	7-5 6-4 ret.
1904	(United Kingdom of Great Britain and Ireland) Herbert Roper Barrett (7)	(United Kingdom of Great Britain and Ireland) Roy Allen	6-2 6-1 6-3
1905	(United Kingdom of Great Britain and Ireland) Herbert Roper Barrett (8)	(United Kingdom of Great Britain and Ireland) H. Norman Marrett	w/o
1906	(United Kingdom of Great Britain and Ireland) Herbert Roper Barrett (9)	(United Kingdom of Great Britain and Ireland) H. W. Davies	6-1 6-2 6-1
1907	(United Kingdom of Great Britain and Ireland) C.E. Hunter	(United Kingdom of Great Britain and Ireland) David Marc Hawes	6-1 6-4 7-5
1908	(United Kingdom of Great Britain and Ireland) Herbert Roper Barrett (10)	(United Kingdom of Great Britain and Ireland) C. E. Hunter.	6-2 8-6 ret.
1909	(United Kingdom of Great Britain and Ireland) Herbert Roper Barrett (11)	(United Kingdom of Great Britain and Ireland) Andrew Leicester Irvine	6-3 6-1
1910	(United Kingdom of Great Britain and Ireland) Herbert Roper Barrett (12)	(United Kingdom of Great Britain and Ireland) H.J. Weston	6-2, 6-2
1911	(United Kingdom of Great Britain and Ireland) A. L. Bentley	(United Kingdom of Great Britain and Ireland) Xenophon Casdagli	6-4, 3-6, 6-4
1912	(United Kingdom of Great Britain and Ireland) Herbert Roper Barrett (13)	(United Kingdom of Great Britain and Ireland) Andrew Leicester Irvine	6-3 6-3
1914	(United Kingdom of Great Britain and Ireland) G. M. Wilson	?, ?	?
1915–1918	Not held (due to world war one)		
1919 (Note: 1919 edition held in held in Frinton-on-Sea)	(New Zealand) Frank Fisher	Bunny Ireland	6-3, 6-4
1920 (Note: 1920 to 1922 editions held in held in Southend-on-Sea)	(United Kingdom of Great Britain and Ireland) H.N. Marrett	(United Kingdom of Great Britain and Ireland) Neville Wilford	6-4 6-8 6-4 0-6 6-2
1921	(British Raj) Athar-Ali Fyzee	(United Kingdom of Great Britain and Ireland) Neville Wilford	6-8 6-2 2-6 6-3 6-2
1922	(United Kingdom) Jack Weakley	(United Kingdom) G. W. Todd	2-6 11-9 5-7 6-3 6-1
1923 (Note: 1923 to 1937 editions held in held in Westcliff-on-Sea)	(United Kingdom) C. E. St John Evers	(United Kingdom) W. E. Cooke	4-6 7-5 6-3 6-1
1924	(United Kingdom) Jack Weakley (2)	(United Kingdom) C. E. St John Evers	5 7-5 2-6 8-6
1925	(United Kingdom) John Pennycuick	(United Kingdom) C. V. L. Prowse	6-1 6-4 6-3
1926	(United Kingdom) Pat Hughes	(United Kingdom) John Pennycuick	8-6 6-0 6-3
1927	(United Kingdom) Henry Standring	(United Kingdom) Pat Hughes	6-2 6-3 6-0
1928	(United Kingdom) John Shales	(United Kingdom) K. A. Latter.	3-6 6-1 6-4
1929	(United Kingdom) W. E. Turner Cole	(United Kingdom) G. S. Best	6-3 6-2 6-2
1930	(Jamaica) Donald Leahong	(United Kingdom) Jack C. Warboys	2-6 6-0 6-2 6-4
1931	(United Kingdom) A. M. Dudley Pitt	(United Kingdom) R. W. H. Grey	6-0 6-2 6-3
1932	(United Kingdom) David Williams	(United Kingdom) John Shales	7-5 6-2
1933	(United Kingdom) Jimmy Jones	(United Kingdom) David Williams	6-0 6-1 6-4
1934	(Republic of Ireland) George Lyttleton Rogers	(United Kingdom) Jimmy Jones	6-4 6-8 6-4
1935	(United Kingdom) Jimmy Jones (2)	(Italy) Uberto De Morpurgo	6-4 5-7 6-2
1936	(United Kingdom) Laurie Shaffi	(United Kingdom) Jimmy Jones	6-3 5-7 7-5
1937	(United Kingdom) Jimmy Jones (3)	(United Kingdom) Laurie Shaffi	6-3 6-1 6-3
1939	(India) Ghaus M. Khan	(United Kingdom) John Olliff	3-6 7-5 6-0
1940–1945	Not held (and due to world war two)		
1946 (Note: 1946 to 1973 editions held in held in Frinton-on-Sea)	(United Kingdom) Brian Kenton Burnett	(United Kingdom) R. C. F. Nichols	6-1 6-2
1947	(Pakistan) Iftikhar Ahmed Khan	(Republic of China (1912–1949)) Choy Wai-Chuen	6-1 3-6 7-5
1948	(Socialist Federal Republic of Yugoslavia) Franjo Kukuljević	(United Kingdom) Derek Bull	6-1 6-1
1949	(Australia) Geoff Brown	(Republic of China (1912–1949)) Choy Wai-Chuen	6-4 6-1
1950	(Australia) Bill Sidwell	(Australia) Geoff Brown	6-4 4-6 6-2
1951	(Australia) Don Candy	(Denmark) Kurt Nielsen	6-1 6-4
1952	(South Africa) Bryan Woodroffe	(Brazil) Armando Vieira	6-2 11-9
1953	(United Kingdom) Tony Mottram	(Australia) Jack Arkinstall	6-4 6-1
1954	(Australia) Jeff Robson	(New Zealand) John Barry	6-2 6-2
1955	(Australia) Bob Howe	(Australia) George Worthington	3-6 6-3 6-4
1956	(South Africa) Ian Clyde Vermaak	(South Africa) Gordon Forbes	6-4 5-7 6-3
1957	(India) Naresh Kumar	(India) Ramanathan Krishnan	3-6 6-3 9-7
1958	(Australia) Mal Anderson	(Brazil) Carlos Alberto Fernandes	6-1 7-5
1959	(New Zealand) Mark Otway	(New Zealand) Lew Gerrard	6-2 6-2
1960	(Australia) Neale Fraser	(New Zealand) Brian Woolf	6-4 6-2
1961	(Australia) Lew Gerrard	(New Zealand) Ian Crookenden	6-3 3-6 4-6 6-2 6-2
1962	(United Kingdom) Roger Taylor	(Australia) Warren Woodcock	6-3 6-4
1963	(Australia) John Fraser	(India) Jaidip Mukerjea	6-3 6-2
1964	(Australia) Ken Fletcher	(United Kingdom) Roger Taylor	6-8 7-5 6-1
1965	(Australia) Owen Davidson	(Australia) Tony Roche	6-4 8-6
1966	(New Zealand) Brian Fairlie	(United Kingdom) Mark Cox	6-4 10-8
1967	(United Kingdom) Bobby Wilson	(United Kingdom) Paul Hutchins	5-7 6-4 6-3
Open era
1968	(Australia) Dick Crealy	(United Kingdom) Keith Woolridge	6-3 4-6 6-4
1969	(Australia) Graham Primrose	(United Kingdom) Keith Woolridge	6-4 6-3
1970	(South Africa) Keith Diepraam	(Rhodesia) Roger Dowdeswell	6-4 6-1
1971	(United Kingdom) Gerald Battrick	(India) Anand Amritraj	6-3 6-2
1972	(Denmark) Torben Ulrich	(United Kingdom) J. D. Edmond	7-5 6-4
1973	(United Kingdom) Philip Siviter	(United Kingdom) Geoffrey Newton	6-4 6-4
1974	(South Africa) David Schneider	(South Africa) Willem Prinsloo	3-6 6-4 6-4
1975	(Australia) Hugh Thomson	(United Kingdom) Roger Webb	7-9 9-7 9-7
1976	(United Kingdom) Mark Farrell	(Australia) Noel Phillips	6-3 6-4
1977	(United Kingdom) Willie Davies	(United Kingdom) Colin McHugo	6-3 6-2
1978	(United Kingdom) Robert Booth	(United Kingdom) Chris Wells	6-3 6-4
1979	(United Kingdom) Willie Davies (2)	(United Kingdom) Neil Rayner	6-3 6-4
1980	(United Kingdom) Martin Guntrip	(United Kingdom) David Crichton-Miller	6-4 1-6 7-5
1981	(United Kingdom) Rohun Beven	(United Kingdom) R. Coull	6-2 6-1
1982	(United Kingdom) Leighton Alfred	(United Kingdom) Martin Robinson	6-4 7-6

=== Women's singles ===
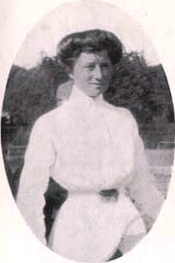
Agnes Mary Morton won 7 women's singles titles.

(Incomplete roll)

Year	Champion	Runner-up	Score
1887	(United Kingdom) Brenda James	(United Kingdom) May Jacks	6-8, 6-2, 6-4
1888	(United Kingdom) Miss Triscott	(United Kingdom) Brenda James	6-4, 0-6, 6-4
1889	(United Kingdom) Miss Norman	(United Kingdom) Helen Kersey	6-2, 6-2
1890	(United Kingdom) Brenda James (2)	(United Kingdom) Miss Swift	2-6, 6-4, 6-1
1890	(United Kingdom) Winifred Kersey	(United Kingdom) Agnes Morton	5-7, 6-1, 6-2
1891	Women's event not held		
1892	(United Kingdom) Miss. C. Day	(United Kingdom) Miss. E. Brown	6-2, 4-6, 6-3
1893/1894	Women's event handicap only		
1895	(United Kingdom) Agatha Templeman	(United Kingdom) Agnes Morton	6-4, 6-2
1896	(United Kingdom) Ruth Pennington-Legh	(United Kingdom) Agatha Templeman	6-4, 7-5
1897	(United Kingdom) Henrietta Horncastle	(United Kingdom) Ursula Templeman	6-0, 6-2
1898	(United Kingdom) Beryl Tulloch	(United Kingdom) Henrietta Horncastle	6-0, 6-2
1899	(United Kingdom) Beryl Tulloch (2)	(United Kingdom) Agnes Morton	6-1, 3-6, 7-5
1900	(United Kingdom) Ruth Winch (2)	(United Kingdom) Beryl Tulloch	6-0, 6-0
1901	(United Kingdom) Dorothea Douglass	(United Kingdom) Agnes Morton	6-3, 6-3
1902	(United Kingdom) Winifred Longhurst	(United Kingdom) Dorothea Douglass	1-6, 6-3, 6-4
1903	(United Kingdom) Edith Austin Greville	(United Kingdom) Agnes Morton	6-1, 6-3
1904	(United Kingdom) Agnes Morton	(United Kingdom) Miss Tootell	6-1, 6-3
1905	(United Kingdom) Agnes Morton (2)	(United Kingdom) Miss Tootell	6-2, 6-0
1906	(United Kingdom) Agnes Morton (3)	(United Kingdom) Miss Tootell	6-2, 6-0
1907	(United Kingdom) Agnes Morton (4)	(United Kingdom) Mrs C.E. Hunter	walkover
1908	(United Kingdom) Agnes Morton (5)	(United Kingdom) Miss. E. White	6-0, 6-0
1909	(United Kingdom) Agnes Morton (6)	(United Kingdom) Mildred Brooksmith	6-1, 6-0
1910	(United Kingdom) Mildred Brooksmith	(United Kingdom) Madeline Fisher O'Neill	4-6, 6-1, 6-4
1911	(United Kingdom) Agnes Morton (7)	(United Kingdom) Mrs C.E. Hunter	6-1, 6-1
1912	(United States) Elizabeth Ryan	(United Kingdom) Jessie Coles	6-3, 6-4
1913	Women's event not held		
1914	(United Kingdom) Mrs Leigh-Day	(United Kingdom) Miss Daniell	6-,1 3-6, 6-3
1915/1919	Women's event not held due to World War I		
1920	(South Africa) Irene Bowder Peacock	(United Kingdom) Mrs Malleson	6-2, 6-1
1921	(South Africa) Irene Bowder Peacock (2)	(United Kingdom) Geraldine Beamish	6-3, 2-6, 6-4
1922	(South Africa) Irene Bowder Peacock (3)	(United Kingdom) Eleanor Rose	6-4, 6-4
1923	(United Kingdom) Miss. M. Best	(United Kingdom) Mrs. P. Wilkin	6-2, 6-1
1924	(United Kingdom) Mrs P. Wilkin	(United Kingdom) Davina Gordon	6-1, 6-1
1925	(United Kingdom) Joan Ridley	(United Kingdom) Mrs B.H. Wilkin	6-3, 6-2
1926	(United Kingdom) Joan Ridley (2)	(United Kingdom) Mary Cambridge	6-4, 6-2
1927	(United Kingdom) Eleanor Rose	(United Kingdom) Joan Ridley	6-2, 2-6, 7-5
1928	(United Kingdom) Eleanor Rose (2)	(United Kingdom) Sybil Johnson	6-0, 6-1
1929	(United Kingdom) Eleanor Rose (3)	(United Kingdom) Joan Marshall	11-9, 3-6, 6-2
1930	(United Kingdom) Billie Yorke	(United Kingdom) D. Sloane-Stanley	6-2, 6-4
1931	(United Kingdom) Billie Yorke (2)	(United Kingdom) Miss. E. Weakley	6-1, 6-1
1932	(United Kingdom) Jean Saunders	(United Kingdom) Billie Yorke	7-5, 6-8, 6-4
1933	(United Kingdom) Patricia Brazier	(United Kingdom) Gladys Southwell	3-6, 6-4, 9-7
1934	(United Kingdom) Sheila Chuter	(United Kingdom) Joan Marshall	6-3, 6-2
1935	(United Kingdom) Gladys Southwell	(United Kingdom) Sheila Chuter	7-5, 6-2
1936	(United Kingdom) Gladys Southwell (2)	(United Kingdom) Nina Brown	6-4, 6-2
1937	(United Kingdom) Gladys Southwell	(United Kingdom) Nina Brown	6-2, 8-6
1938	(United Kingdom) Elsie Goldsack Pittman	(United Kingdom) Alexandra Ostrich McKelvie	9-7, 2-6, 6-1
1939	(United Kingdom) Valerie Scott	(United Kingdom) Kay Stammers	6-0, 5-7, 7-5
1940/1945	Women's event not held due to World War II		
1946	(United Kingdom) Jean Nicoll-Bostock	(United Kingdom) Kay Stammers Menzies	4-6, 6-3, 6-2
1947	(United Kingdom) Jean Nicoll-Bostock (2)	(United Kingdom) Gem Hoahing	6-1, 6-1
1948	(United Kingdom) Jean Nicoll-Bostock (3)	(United Kingdom) Natalia Zinovieff	6-2, 6-1
1949	(United States) Patricia Canning Todd	(United Kingdom) Molly Blair	6-2, 6-2
1950	(United States) Patricia Canning Todd (2)	(United Kingdom) Betty Wilford	6-1, 6-0
1951	(United States) Althea Gibson	(United States) Arvilla McGuire	6-0, 6-2
1952	(United Kingdom) Jean Walker-Smith	(United Kingdom) Jean Rinkel-Quertier	7-5, 6-3
1953	(South Africa) Joan Scott	(United Kingdom) Betty Wilford Dawes	6-2, 6-0
1954	(United Kingdom) Anne Shilcock	(New Zealand) Judy Burke	6-3, 6-3
1955	(Australia) Beryl Penrose	(Australia) Mary Carter	8-6, 4-6, 6-3
1956	(United Kingdom) Anne Shilcock (2)	(Australia) Margaret H. O'Donnell	6-4, 6-2
1957	(New Zealand) Ruia Morrison	(New Zealand) Heather Redwood Robson	3-6, 6-2, 7-5
1958	(United Kingdom) Christine Truman	(United Kingdom) Anne Shilcock	6-3, 7-5
1959	(United Kingdom) Shirley Bloomer Brasher	(United Kingdom) Patricia Hird	7-5, 1-6, 6-3
1960	(United Kingdom) Deidre Catt	(United Kingdom) Patricia Hird	6-2, 6-4
1961	(United Kingdom) Patricia Hird	(United Kingdom) Caroline Yates-Bell	6-2, 6-3
1962	(Australia) Jan Lehane	(Australia) Robyn Ebbern	6-3, 6-2
1963	(United Kingdom) Deidre Catt (2)	(United Kingdom) Christine Truman	7-5, 7-5
1964	(United Kingdom) Deidre Catt (3)	(United Kingdom) Carole Rosser	8-6, 6-4
1965	(Australia) Lesley Turner	(United Kingdom) Robin Blakelock-Lloyd	6-4, 6-3
1966	(Australia) Judy Tegart	(United Kingdom) Nell Truman	6-2, 6-0
1967	(United Kingdom) Ann Haydon Jones	(Australia) Gail Sherriff	6-0, 6-2
Open era
1968	(United Kingdom) Robin Blakelock-Lloyd	(United Kingdom) Nell Truman	6-3, 8-6
1969	(Australia) Margaret Smith Court	(South Africa) Patricia Walkden	6-2, 4-6, 6-4
1970	(Australia) Margaret Smith Court (2)	(United Kingdom) Ann Haydon Jones	2-6, 7-5, 6-2
1971	(Australia) Kerry Harris	(Australia) Helen Gourlay	6-2, 6-4
1972	(United Kingdom) Lindsay Beaven	(United Kingdom) Cherry Panton	6-2, 6-0
1973	(United Kingdom) Corinne Molesworth	(South Africa) Greer Stevens	7-5, 8-6
1974	(United Kingdom) Corinne Molesworth (2)	(New Zealand) Beverley Vercoe	7-6, 6-4
1975	(United Kingdom) Annette Coe	(United Kingdom) Belinda Thompson	6-3, 6-4
1976	(United Kingdom) Corinne Molesworth (3)	(United Kingdom) Jo Durie	6-4, 9-8
1977	(United Kingdom) Ann Haydon Jones (2)	(United Kingdom) Debra Parker	6-3, 7-5
1978	(United Kingdom) Corinne Molesworth (4)	(United Kingdom) Ann Haydon Jones	6-3, 7-6
1979	(United Kingdom) Corinne Molesworth (5)	(United Kingdom) Annette Coe	6-2, 6-4
1980	(United Kingdom) Denise Taylor	(United Kingdom) Ellinore Lightbody	divided title
1981	(Hong Kong) Joy Tacon	(United Kingdom) Debbie Stewart	walkover
1982	(United Kingdom) Rina Einy	(United Kingdom) Lorrayne Gracie	6-0, 6-0
1983	(Australia) Bernadette Randall	(Australia) Vicki Marle	6-2, 6-3

== Locations ==
The tournament was staged at different locations during its run the longest at Frinton-on-Sea.

Locations	Dates
Brentwood	(1881-1884)
Leyton	(1887, 1890)
Chingford	(1888-1889, 1891, 1892)
Colchester	(1891, 1893-1914)
Frinton-on-Sea	(1919, 1946-1983)
Southend-on-Sea	(1920-1922)
Westcliff-on-Sea	(1923-1937)

== Tournament records ==
- Most men's singles titles: (United Kingdom) Herbert Roper Barrett (13)
- Most women's singles titles: (United Kingdom) Agnes Morton (7)

== Sources ==
- "Abolition of Challenge Rounds". paperspast.natlib.govt.nz. EVENING POST, VOLUME CIII, ISSUE 65, 20 MARCH 1922.
- Daily Advertiser (Wagga Wagga, NSW : 1911 - 1954). 23 July 1951.
- "Essex Championships, Frinton-On-Sea - WTA Tournaments - Grand Slam History". www.grandslamhistory.com. 2009–2018.
- Kramer, Edited by Max Robertson. Advisory editor: Jack (1974). The encyclopedia of tennis. New York: Viking Press.ISBN 9780670294084.
- Morris, James; Hegedus, Tomas (2013). "1877 to 2012 Finals Results". www.stevegtennis.com. stevegtennis.
- Nieuwland, Alex. (2009-2017). "Tournament – Essex Championships". www.tennisarchives.com. Harlingen, Netherlands: Idzznew BV.
- Orcutt, William Dana (1897). Official Lawn Tennis Bulletin Volume 4. White Plains, New York, USA: United States Lawn Tennis Association.
- Sport and Athletics in 1908: An Annual Register Including the Results of the Year 1908 (to November) of All the Important Events in Athletics, Games, and Every Form of Sport in the United Kingdom, Together with the Winners, Records, and Notable Achievements of Past Years; Also a Full List of Results in the Olympic Games. London, England: Chapman & Hall. 1908.
- Tennis Events". The Illustrated London News Volume 263. London, England: Illustrated London News & Sketch Limited. 1975.
- Warwick Daily News (Qld. : 1919 -1954). 19 July 1949.
