= Devonshire Park Championships =

Defunct tennis tournament
- Founded: 1880; 145 years ago
- Abolished: 1882; 143 years ago
- Editions: 2
- Location: Eastbourne, Sussex, England.
- Venue: Devonshire Park Lawn Tennis Club
- Surface: Grass

The Devonshire Park Championships was a grass court tennis tournament usually staged in the third week of August annually. It first established in 1880 at Eastbourne, East Sussex, England which ran for only two editions until August 1881. In July 1881 the Devonshire Park Lawn Tennis Club was formally founded. In September 1881 it then staged the first South of England Championships which replaced this event.

== History ==
On 1 July 1874 Devonshire Park, originally intended as a cricket ground, opened its gates to the public. In 1879, the first tennis courts was marked out on its lawns. In August 1880 the first Devonshire Park Championships were staged in the third week of August that year. The first winner of the men's singles was Britain's Dale Womersley. The men's final singles winner was Englands George S. Murray Hill. In September 1881 the lawn tennis club decided to stage an open regional championship event known as the South of England Championships the inaugural men's singles was won by Britain's Edgar Lubbock, and the women's event was won by England's Agnes Noon Watts.

== Finals ==
=== Men's Singles ===
Incomplete Roll

Year	Champions	Runners-up	Score
1880	(United Kingdom) Dale Womersley	(England) Frederick Brunning Maddison	6-4, 3-6, 6-2, 6-3.
1881	(England) George S. Murray Hill	(England) Sidney Alfred Noon	2 sets to 0.

=== Women's Singles ===
Incomplete Roll

Year	Champions	Runners-up	Score
1881	(England) Agnes Watts	(England) E Hudson	2 sets to 0.

=== Mix Doubles ===
Incomplete Roll

Year	Champions	Runners-up	Score
1881	(England) Sidney Alfred Noon (England) Agnes Watts	(United Kingdom) E Hudson (United Kingdom) E.R. Hudson	2 sets to 0.
