= Yare LTC Tournament =

Defunct tennis tournament
- Event name
- Founded: 1879; 146 years ago
- Abolished: 1879; 146 years ago
- Location: Recreation Grounds, Fritton, Great Yarmouth, Norfolk, England
- Venue: Yare Lawn Tennis Club
- Surface: Grass

The Yare LTC Tournament a late Victorian era grass court tennis tournament staged first staged in August 1879. The tournament was organised by the Yare Lawn Tennis Club, and held on the Recreation Grounds, Fritton, Great Yarmouth, Norfolk, England. The tournament was held only one time.

== History ==
The Yare LTC Tournament was grass court tennis event first staged from Thursday 4 September to Saturday 6 September 1879. This tournament was held for one edition only and appeared to have ended. This event was organised by the Yare Lawn Tennis Club, and was played on the recreation grounds at Fritton, Great Yarmouth, Norfolk, England. The gentleman's singles title was won by Mr. Percy Lucas who defeated Mr. Julian Marshall.

== Sources ==
- Finch-Crisp, William (2020). Chronological Retrospect of the History of Yarmouth and Neighbourhood, From AD 46 to 1884. Frankfurt, Germany: Outlook Verlag GMbH. ISBN 9783752389531.
- Nieuwland, Alex. "Tournament – Yare Lawn Tennis Club". www.tennisarchives.com. Tennis Archives.
- Yarmouth Independent. (28 August 1879) Yarmouth, Norfolk, England: British Newspaper Archives.
