= Montagu Hankey =

English cleric

The Reverend Montagu Hankey
- Church: Church of England
- Diocese: Salisbury

Personal details
- Born: 16 August 1840 Wimbledon, Middlesex, England
- Died: 25 August 1919 (aged 79) Dorchester, Dorset, England
- Denomination: Anglican

The Rev. Montagu Hankey (16 August 1840 – 25 August 1919) also known as Monty Hankey was an English cleric who served as Prebendary of Salisbury Cathedral (1885–1919), and Proctor of the Diocese of Salisbury (1900–1919).

Hankey was also a notable lawn tennis player he competed at the first Wimbledon Championships in 1877 and again in 1880.

== Career ==
Montagu Hankey was on 16 August 1840 in Wimbledon, Surrey, England. He was educated at Eton College. On leaving Eton he attended Trinity College, Cambridge in February 1859; B.A. 1863; M.A. 1866. He was Ordained deacon (Canterbury) 1866; priest (London) 1868. From 1866 to 1867 he was Canon of Ramsgate. From 1867 to 1868 he served as Canon of St Giles in the Fields, London. From 1868 to 1913 he was appointed as Rector of Maiden Newton in Dorset. He then served as Rural Dean of Bridport between 1885 and 1913. Also appointed Prebendary of Salisbury Cathedral from 1885 to 1919. His final appointment was as Proctor of the Diocese of Salisbury from 1900 to 1919.

Revered Monty Hankey died in Dorchester, Dorset, England On 25 August 1919 aged 79.

== Sportsman ==
Montague Hankey
- Country (sports): GBR
- Born: 16 August 1840 Wimbledon, Middlesex, England
- Died: 25 August 1919 (age 79) Dorchester, Dorset, England
- Turned pro: 1877 (amateur tour)
- Retired: 1887

Singles
- Career record: 20–9
- Career titles: 3

Grand Slam singles results
- Wimbledon: 2R (1877)

Hankey was also a notable tennis player in his youth. He played his first tournament at the inaugural 1877 Wimbledon Championships where he lost in the second round to eventual winner Spencer Gore. In 1879 he took part in the Dorchester Kingston Park Tournament which he won defeating Captain James Jocelyn Glascott in the final. In 1880 he played the Blackmoor Vale LTC Tournament where he reached the semi finals.

In July that year he took part in the Wimbledon Championships for the second and final time where he was defeated in the first round by Richard Ridley Farrer. In 1881 he took part in the Bournemouth CLTC Autumn Tournament where he won the title, he successfully defended the title again in 1882.

In 1883 he was a losing semi finalist at the Cirencester Park Lawn Tennis Tournament to Charles Lacy Sweet. That year he also competed at the Exmouth Open where Lacy Sweet beat him again. He took part in the Bournemouth Lawn Tennis Club Tournament in 1885 where he was a losing semi finalist. He played his final tournament in 1887 at the Weymouth Open. He was active between 1877 and 1887 and won 3 career singles titles.

== Family ==
Montagu was the fifth son of Thomas Hankey II, Montagu Known to his friends as Monty. He married his second cousin Alice Aitcheson Hankey (1843-1916) the second daughter of General Henry Aitchison Hankey; they had one child Ethyl Louisa Hankey (1866-1921).
