= Dorchester Kingston Park Tournament =

Defunct tennis tournament
- Founded: 1879; 146 years ago
- Abolished: 1885; 140 years ago
- Location: Kingston Park, Dorchester, Dorset, England
- Venue: Kingston Maurward House
- Surface: Grass

The Dorchester Kingston Park Tournament a late Victorian era grass court tennis tournament staged first staged in August 1879. The tournament was organised by the Kingston Park Cricket and Lawn Tennis Club, and held on the cricket grounds, Kingston Park, Kingston Maurward House, Dorchester, Dorset, England. The tournament was held to at least 1885.

== History ==
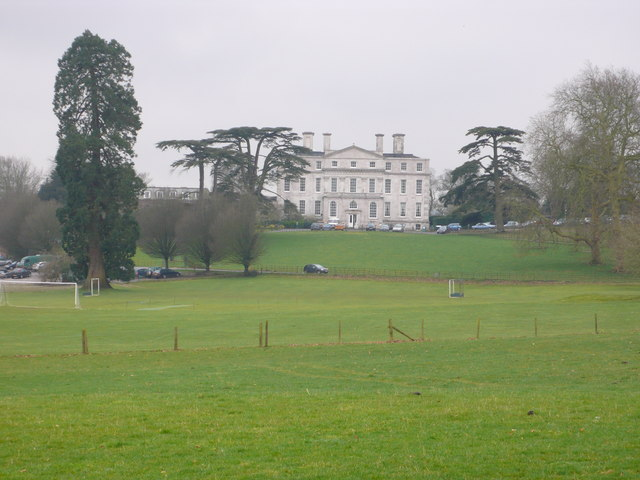

(Kingston Maurward House and grounds, in 2008 the location of this tournament)

In August 1879 the Kingston Park Cricket and Lawn Tennis Club held a lawn tennis tournament on the cricket grounds of Kingston Park, Kingston Maurward House, Dorchester, Dorset, England. The club continued to hold a number of annual tournaments in the spring, summer, and autumn, through till 1885. The inaugural gentleman's singles was won by Montague Hankey, who competed at the 1877 and 1880 Wimbledon Championships.

Although this tournament was abolished the Kingston Park Lawn Tennis Club reestablished a new tennis event during the 1920s called the Kingston Park Invitation Open Tennis Tournament. In 1928 Prince George of Greece and Denmark played in the tournament that year. It was still being held till the mid 1930s.

In 1937 Kingston Park Lawn Tennis Club hosted the Dorset County Tennis Championships.

== Sources ==
- Bridport News. (22 August 1879) Bridport, Dorest, England: British Newspaper Archives.
- National Sports. (1879) The Illustrated London News. London:
- Nieuwland, Alex. "Tournament – Dorchester". www.tennisarchives.com. Tennis Archives.
- Player Profile: Montague Hankey. www.wimbledon.com. AELTC.
- Poole Telegram. (24 August 1885) Poole, Dorset, England: British Newspaper Archives.
- Southern Times and Dorset County Herald. (26 June 1880) Weymouth, Dorset, England: British Newspaper Archives.
- Southern Times and Dorset County Herald. (17 September 1881) Weymouth, Dorset, England: British Newspaper Archives.
- Western Gazette. (2 August 1928) Yeovil, Somerset, England.: British Newspaper Archives.
- Western Gazette. (9 August 1935) Yeovil, Somerset, England.: British Newspaper Archives.
- Western Gazette. (6 August 1937) Yeovil, Somerset, England.: British Newspaper Archives.
