= Hampshire Tennis Championships =

Defunct tennis tournament
- Event name: Bournemouth Cricket and Lawn Tennis Club Tournament (1878–1882); Bournemouth Lawn Tennis Club Tournament (1882-91); Bournemouth Open(1891-1905); Hampshire County Lawn Tennis Championship (1906-10); Hampshire Lawn Tennis Championships (1911-1960); Hampshire Championships (1960-1971); Hampshire Tennis Championships(1972-1982)
- Founded: 1878; 147 years ago
- Abolished: 1981; 44 years ago
- Location: Bournemouth, Dorset, England
- Venue: Dean Park
- Surface: Grass

The Hampshire Tennis Championships or the Hampshire Championships was a men's and women's grass court tennis event established in 1878 as the Bournemouth CLTC Tournament. In 1906 the Bournemouth tournament was upgraded to a county level event and renamed as Hampshire County Lawn Tennis Championships that ran continuously until 1981.

== History ==
On 21 May 1878 the Bournemouth Cricket and Lawn Tennis Club staged its first tennis spring meeting the Bournemouth CLTC Tournament held at the cricket ground Dean Park, Bournemouth, Dorset, England that concluded on 24 May 1878. In October 1878 a second autumn meeting was also held at the same venue.

In 1891 the Bournemouth LTC Tournament became known as the Bournemouth Open Tournament. In 1906 the Bournemouth Open Tournament as it was called, was upgraded to a county level event and renamed as the Hampshire Lawn Tennis Championships, that ran continuously until 1981 when it ceased to be part of the international tennis tour.

This tournament is still being staged today as a merged event called the Hampshire & IOW County Championships.

== Finals ==
=== Men's Singles ===
(Incomplete roll)

Year	Champion	Runner-up	Score
Bournemouth Cricket and Lawn Tennis Club Tournament
1878	(England) Hubert Medlycott	?	?
1879	(England) Edmond Brackenbury	(England) Hubert Medlycott	3 sets to 2
1880	(England) Frank Benson	(England) F.A. Campbell	6-1, 6-1, 6-3
1881	(England) Montague Hankey	(England) J.G. Johnston	6-2, 6-3, 6-0
1882	(England) Montague Hankey	(England) William Henry Birkbeck	2 sets to 1
Bournemouth Lawn Tennis Club Tournament
1883	(United Kingdom) Ernest Wool Lewis	(Spain) Jose d'Almeida	6-0, 6-0 ret.
1884	(United Kingdom) Ernest Wool Lewis (2)	(United Kingdom) Aston Cooper-Key	6-0, 6-2, 6-3
1885	(United Kingdom) Ernest Wool Lewis (3)	(United Kingdom) Charles Hoadley Ashe Ross	6-2, 6-1, 6-4
1886	(United Kingdom) Ernest Wool Lewis (4)	(United Kingdom) H.M. Nicholls	6-0, 6-1, 6-2
1887	(United Kingdom) Ernest Wool Lewis (5)	(United Kingdom) H. Phillip	6-2, 6-4, 6-3
1888	(United Kingdom) Ernest Wool Lewis (6)	(United Kingdom) Arthur Story	6-4, 6-1, 6-1
1889	(United Kingdom) Ernest Wool Lewis (7)	(United Kingdom) Harry Sibthorpe Barlow	6-4, 6-3, 6-1
1890	(United Kingdom) Henry George Biddle	(United Kingdom) David Elgar Payn	6-4, 4-6, 6-2, 6-0
Bournemouth Open Tournament
1891	(United Kingdom) Horace Chapman	(United Kingdom) Harry Sibthorpe Barlow	10-12, 9-7, 6-3, 6-4
1892	(United Kingdom) Horace Chapman (2)	(Ireland) Joshua Pim	w.o.
1896	(Ireland) Herbert Newcombe Craig	(United Kingdom) Allan Campbell Pearson	2-6, 6-1, 6-2
1897	(Ireland) Herbert Newcombe Craig (2)	(United Kingdom) Arthur Cyril Ransome	3-6, 2-6 6-2, 6-2, 6-1
1898	(Ireland) Herbert Newcombe Craig (3)	(Ireland) Grainger Chaytor	(stopped bad weather)
1899	(United Kingdom) Philip Graeme Pearson	(United Kingdom) Allan Campbell Pearson	6-1 6-2 6-4
1900	(United Kingdom) D.G. Fry	(United Kingdom) Hugh Matthew Sweetman	0-6 9-7 ret.
1901	(United Kingdom) Brame Hillyard	(United Kingdom) Edward Yatman	6-3, 6-3
1902	(United Kingdom) Jack Ridding	(United Kingdom) Robert Fletcher Leslie	6-4, 6-4
1903	(United Kingdom) Alexander Fellowes	(United Kingdom) John Baker Dufall	
1904	(United Kingdom) Roy Allen	(New Zealand) Anthony Wilding	6-1, 6-1
1905	(United Kingdom) Roy Allen (2)	(United Kingdom) G. Elwin Evered	6-0, 6-3
Hampshire County Lawn Tennis Championship
1906	(United Kingdom) Jack Ridding (2)	(United Kingdom) Roy Allen	1-6, 6-4, 6-4
1907	(United Kingdom) Roy Allen (3)	(United Kingdom) John Rendall	6-0, 6-1
1908	(United Kingdom) Roy Allen (4)	(India) Bernard Oswald Roe	6-2, 6-1
1909	(United Kingdom) Roy Allen (5)	(United Kingdom) Gordon W. Smith	7-5, 6-0
1910	(United Kingdom) George Alan Thomas	(Australia) Stanley Doust	6-3, 7-5
1915/1918	men's event not held due to World War I		
Hampshire Lawn Tennis Championships
1919	(New Zealand) Frank Fisher	(United Kingdom) Charles Tuckey	6-3, 7-5
1920	(South Africa) Louis Bosman Raymond	(South Africa) Cecil Blackbeard	4-6, 7-5, 7-5
1921	(New Zealand) Frank Fisher (2)	(United Kingdom) A.C.D. Campbell	6-3, 6-2
1922	(New Zealand) Frank Fisher (3)	(United Kingdom) F.T. Martin	?
1923	(United Kingdom) Brame Hillyard (2)	(United Kingdom) Mr. Henley	6-3, 2-6, 6-2
1924	(Australia) James Bayley	(New Zealand) Frank Fisher	6-4, 6-3
1925	(United Kingdom) Patrick Wheatley	(United Kingdom) N.R. Chapman	6-2, 6-3
1926	(United Kingdom) Jack Hillyard	(India) Udupi Diggavi Ranga Rao	6-3, 6-1
1927	(United Kingdom) John Pennycuick	(India) Sydney Jacob	6-0, 6-8, 7-5
1928	(New Zealand) Eskel Andrews	(United Kingdom) Keats Lester	4-6, 6-3, 6-4
1929	(United Kingdom) Eric Peters	(United Kingdom) Jack Lysaght	6-2, 6-4
1930	(New Zealand) Eskel Andrews (2)	(United Kingdom) Patrick Wheatley	7-5, 6-2
1931	(Japan) Jiro Sato	(South Africa) Vernon Kirby	3-6, 9-7, 7-5
1932	(United Kingdom) Henry G. E. Evered	(United Kingdom) Norman Taylor	6-1, 6-4
1933	(South Africa) Norman Farquharson	(South Africa) Vernon Kirby	6-2, 9-7
1934	(Australia) Vivian McGrath	(Australia) Cam Malfroy	6-4, 5-7, 6-3
1935	(Australia) Cam Malfroy	(Republic of Ireland) George McVeagh	6-8, 6-2, 6-1
1936	(Australia) Adrian Quist	(Australia) Clifford Sproule	6-2, 6-0
1937	(New Zealand) Alan Stedman	(Australia) Cam Malfroy	6-2, 6-1
1938	(United Kingdom) Don Butler	(United Kingdom) George Godsell	6-3, 3-6, 6-2
1939	(United Kingdom) Don Butler (2)	(New Zealand) Jack Gunn	6-4, 6-4
1949/1945	men's event not held due to World War I		
1946	(Poland) Ignacy Tłoczyński	(United Kingdom) Derek Hardwick	6-1, 6-3
1947	(Republic of Ireland) Joseph McHale	(United Kingdom) R.G. Salmon	8-6, 8-6
1948	(United Kingdom) Tim Lewis	(United Kingdom) George Godsell	6-1, 2-6, 6-3
1949	(United Kingdom) David S. Anderton	(United Kingdom) Derek Hardwick	6-3, 6-4
1950	(United Kingdom) Tim Lewis (2)	(United Kingdom) David S. Anderton	6-2, 6-2
1952	(United Kingdom) Tim Lewis (3)	(United Kingdom) Colin W. Hannam	4-6, 6-2, 7-5
1953	(United Kingdom) Ron G. Reeve	(United Kingdom) John M. Melhuish	6-4, 6-3
1954	(United Kingdom) E.M.G. Earl	(United Kingdom) David S. Anderton	6-2 6-1
1955	(United Kingdom) Ed Bulmer	(United Kingdom) I.N. Stewart	6-2, 6-4
1956	(United Kingdom) Ian Charles King	(United Kingdom) Derek Collins	7-5, 6-3
1959	(Kenya) Henry D 'Souza	(United Kingdom) R.P. Chesterton	6-3, 6-1
Hampshire Championships
1960	(United Kingdom) Geoff Bluett	(United Kingdom) M. Frost	6-2, 6-3
1966	(United Kingdom) A.S. Bull	(United Kingdom) J.J. Quinn	?
Open era
1968	(United Kingdom) John Crump	(South Africa) Colin Rees	6-2, 6-3
1969	(United Kingdom) John Crump (2)	(United Kingdom) John de Mendoza	8-6, 6-2
1970	(Australia) Alun Jones	(United Kingdom) Mike Wayman	6-4, 4-6, 8-6
1971	(United Kingdom) Richard A. Leslie	(United Kingdom) A.P. Billingham	6-4, 1-6, 8-6
Hampshire Tennis Championships
1972	(United Kingdom) Richard A. Leslie (2)	(Israel) Yair Wertheimer	7-5, 6-1
1973	(United Kingdom) Jasper Cooper	(United Kingdom) Martin Cornish	6-4, 4-6, 6-2
1975	(United Kingdom) Jasper Cooper (2)	(United Kingdom) C. Collins	6-2, 6-1
1976	(United Kingdom) Jasper Cooper (3)	(Cyprus) B. Joannides	6-2, 6-1
1977	(United Kingdom) Andy W Paton	(Sweden) Ola Malmqvist	6-3, 7-5
1978	(United Kingdom) Robert Booth	(New Zealand) Clint Harris	6-1, 6-4
1979	(Egypt) Tarek El-Sakka	(United Kingdom) Tim Robson	
1980	(United Kingdom) Patrick Hughesman	(United Kingdom) G. Petrie	6-2, 6-2
1981	(New Zealand) Clint Harris	(United Kingdom) Tim Robson	6-2, 6-2

=== Women's singles ===
(Incomplete roll) two versions of the women's event held in * May and ** August.

Year	Champion	Runner-up	Score
Bournemouth Lawn Tennis Club Tournament
1883	(England) Mrs Hornby	(England) M. Richards	5-6, 6-3, 6-1
1884	(England) F. Davies	(England) Mrs Hornby	3-6, 6-2, 6-5
1885	(England) Mrs Surman	(England) Mrs Hornby	divided title
1886	(England) Mrs Hornby (2)	(England) B. Hannaford	6-3, 6-3
1887	(England) Constance Bryan	(Ireland) Beatrice Langrishe	6-1, 6-3
1888	(Ireland) May Langrishe	(England) Constance Bryan	6-1, 7-5
1889	(Ireland) May Langrishe (2)	(England) Constance Bryan	6-4, 6-4
1890	(Ireland) May Langrishe (3)	(England) Constance Bryan	6-1, 4-6, 6-3
Bournemouth Open Tournament
1891	(United Kingdom) Violet Pinckney	(United Kingdom) Elsie Pinckney	w.o.
1892	(United Kingdom) Violet Pinckney (2)	(United Kingdom) Charlotte Cooper	w.o.
1893/1895	women's event not held		
1896	(United Kingdom) Violet Pinckney (3)	(United Kingdom) Amy Ransome	6-3, 6-1
1897	women's event not held		
1898	(United Kingdom) Charlotte Cooper	(United Kingdom) Blanche Bingley Hillyard	divided title
1899	(United Kingdom) Ruth Winch	(United Kingdom) Alice Greene	6-2, 6-0
1900	women's event not held		
1901	(United Kingdom) Ruth Winch (2)	(United Kingdom) Violet Pinckney	6-1, 6-4
1902	(United Kingdom) Ruth Winch (3)	(United Kingdom) Amy Ransome	11-9, 6-1
1903	(United Kingdom) Connie Wilson	(United Kingdom) Ellen Mary Stawell-Brown	6-4, 6-2
1904	(United Kingdom) Connie Wilson (2)	(United Kingdom) M. Britain	6-2, 6-4
1905	(United Kingdom) Violet Pinckney (4)	(United Kingdom) Amy Ransome	1-6, 6-1, 6-2
Hampshire County Lawn Tennis Championship
1906	(United Kingdom) Gladys Eastlake-Smith	(United Kingdom) Ellen Thynne Evered	6-2, 6-3
1907	(United Kingdom) Gladys Eastlake-Smith	(United Kingdom) Ellen Thynne Evered	1-6, 6-2, 7-5
1908	(United Kingdom) Edith Boucher	(United Kingdom) Gladys Lamplough	6-1, 6-3
1909	(United Kingdom) Violet Pinckney (5)	(United Kingdom) Beryl Tulloch	8-6, 6-3
1910	(United Kingdom) Beryl Tulloch	(United Kingdom) Jessie Tripp	5-7, 6-1, 6-1
Hampshire Lawn Tennis Championships
1911	(United Kingdom) Edith Hannam (2)	(United Kingdom) Agnes Tuckey	6-4, 6-3
1912	(United Kingdom) Edith Hannam (3)	(United Kingdom) Agnes Tuckey	6-2, 6-2
1913	(United Kingdom) Edith Hannam (4)	(United Kingdom) Agnes Tuckey	8-6, 6-0
1914	(United Kingdom) Agnes Tuckey	(United Kingdom) Lavinia Radeglia	6-0, 6-4
1915/1918	women's event not held due to World War I		
1919	(United Kingdom) Kitty McKane	(United Kingdom) Doris Craddock	6-2, 6-1
1920	(United Kingdom) Doris Craddock	(United Kingdom) Mrs A.A. Hall	6-2, 6-1
1921	(United Kingdom) Kathleen Lidderdale	(United Kingdom) Doris Covell Craddock	6-3, 6-2
1922	(United Kingdom) Aurea Farrington Edgington	(United Kingdom) Eleanor Rose	divided title
1923	(United Kingdom) Eleanor Rose	(United Kingdom) E. Tanner	6-4, 8-6
1924	(United Kingdom) Geraldine Beamish	(United Kingdom) Eleanor Rose	5-7, 7-5, 6-4
1925	(United Kingdom) Geraldine Beamish (2)	(United Kingdom) Violet Chamberlain	2-6, 6-2, 6-4
1926	(United Kingdom) Violet Chamberlain	(United Kingdom) Geraldine Beamish	4-6, 6-2, 6-1
1927	(United Kingdom) Violet Chamberlain (2)	(United Kingdom) Geraldine Beamish	6-1, 6-3
1928	(United Kingdom) Joan Ridley	(United Kingdom) Violet Chamberlain	6-3, 6-3
1929	(United Kingdom) Joan Ridley (2)	(United Kingdom) Elsie Goldsack	6-4, 8-6
1930	(United Kingdom) Joan Ridley (3)	(United Kingdom) Elsie Goldsack Pittman	4-6, 6-4, 6-1
1931	(United Kingdom) Madge Slaney	(United Kingdom) Jeanette Morfey	6-3, 6-3
1932	(United Kingdom) Evelyn Dearman	(United Kingdom) Nancy Lyle	6-4, 6-3
1933	(United Kingdom) Margaret Walsh Mellows	(Australia) Muff Wilson	1-6, 7-5, 6-1
1934	(Australia) Joan Hartigan	(United Kingdom) Madge Slaney	3-6, 6-3, 6-3
1935	(India) Leila Row	(United Kingdom) Joan Ingram	7-5, 6-8 retd.
1936	(United Kingdom) Madge Slaney (2)	(United Kingdom) Patience Thomson	6-2, 6-2
1937	(United Kingdom) Margot Stewart	(United Kingdom) Betty Cooke	7-5, 6-3
1938	(United Kingdom) Mary Hardwick	(United Kingdom) Mona Riddell	6-0, 6-4
1939	(United Kingdom) Margot Stewart	(United Kingdom) Edie Rudd Luxton	6-4, 6-3
1915/1918	women's event not held due to World War II		
1946	(Poland) Jadwiga Jędrzejowska	(United Kingdom) Janet Morgan	6-3, 6-4
1947	(Australia) Nancye Wynne Bolton	(United Kingdom) Jean Walker-Smith	6-2, 6-2
1948	(United Kingdom) Jean Walker-Smith	(United Kingdom) Kathleen Tuckey	6-3, 4-6, 6-2
1949	(United Kingdom) Margaret Emerson	(United Kingdom) Hilaire Newberry	6-0, 6-2
1950	(United Kingdom) Jean Walker-Smith (2)	Kathleen Tuckey	1-6, 6-2, 6-2
1951	(United Kingdom) Angela Buxton	(United Kingdom) Mrs R. Chapman	divided title
1952	(United Kingdom) Anne Shilcock	(United Kingdom) Angela Buxton	6-8, 6-1, 6-2
1953	(United Kingdom) Marion Boundy	(United Kingdom) Mrs R. Chapman	6-1, 6-2
1954	(United Kingdom) Viola White	(United Kingdom) Margaret Grace	6-4, 6-2
1955	(Chile) Anita Lizana Ellis	(United Kingdom) Viola White	6-0, 5-7, 6-0
1956	(United Kingdom) Sheila Bramley	(United Kingdom) Mrs R. Chapman	6-3, 6-3
1957	(United Kingdom) Sheila Bramley (2)	(United Kingdom) Elaine Shenton	4-1, rained out.
1958	(United Kingdom) Sheila Bramley (3)	(United Kingdom) J. Chamberlain	10-8, 7-5
1959	(Chile) Anita Lizana Ellis (2)	(United Kingdom) Elizabeth Starkie	3-6, 6-2, 6-4
1960	(United Kingdom) Sheila Bramley (4)	(United Kingdom) Margaret Lee	6-3, 6-1
Hampshire Championships
1961	(United Kingdom) A. O'Neill	(United Kingdom) K. Howarth	3-6, 6-3, 6-2
1962	(United Kingdom) Ann Owen	K. Wainwright	6-1, 6-4
1963	(United Kingdom) M. White	(United Kingdom) Anthea Rigby	6-1, 7-5
1964	(United Kingdom) Anthea Rigby	(United Kingdom) G. Chapman	8-6, 8-6
1965	(United Kingdom) Elaine Shenton	(United Kingdom) G. Chapman	6-3, 6-1
1966	(United Kingdom) Anthea Rigby (2)	(United Kingdom) Elaine Shenton	divided title
Open era
1968	(South Africa) Brenda Kirk	(South Africa) Marianna Brummer	6-0, 7-5
1969	(United Kingdom) Penny Moor	(United Kingdom) Diane Riste	divided title
1970	(United Kingdom) Diane Riste	(Australia) Barbara Walsh	8-6, 6-1
1971	(United Kingdom) Mrs P. Blackburn	(United Kingdom) Diane Riste	6-2, 6-4
Hampshire Tennis Championships
1972	(United Kingdom) Rosemary Pearson	(United Kingdom) Nuala Dwyer	6-4, 3-6, 6-3
1973	(United Kingdom) Nuala Dwyer	(United Kingdom) M. O'Toole	6-2, 6-2
1975	(Australia) Dianne Evers	(Australia) Michelle Ballheimer	6-1, 6-4
1976	(United Kingdom) P. Roberts	(United Kingdom) L. Hobley	6-3, 9-7
1977	(United Kingdom) L. Hobley	(United Kingdom) Judy Erskine	6-3, 6-1
1978	(United Kingdom) A. Tripp	(United Kingdom) Josephine Smedley	6-2, 6-2
1979*	(United States) Mary Carillo	(United Kingdom) Belinda Thompson	6-2, 6-3
1979**	(Malta) Helen de Giorgio	(United States) Jill Andrews	3-6 6-3 7-5 *
1980*	(South Africa) Susan Rollinson	(Australia) Kate Gulley	6-3, 6-4
1980**	(United Kingdom) Elspeth Young	(United Kingdom) K. Treloar	6-3, 6-3
1981	(Australia) Judy Tegart-Dalton	(United Kingdom) Jane Langstaff	6-0 6-0

== Event names ==
- Bournemouth Cricket and Lawn Tennis Club Tournament (1878–1882)
- Bournemouth Lawn Tennis Club Tournament (1883–1891)
- Bournemouth Open Tournament (1891–1905)
- Hampshire County Lawn Tennis Championship (1906–1910)
- Hampshire Lawn Tennis Championships (1911–1960)
- Hampshire Championships (1960–1971)
- Hampshire Tennis Championships (1972–1981)
