= William Beasley =

Irish jockey

Personal information
- Nationality: Irish
- Occupation: Amateur Jockey

Sport
- Sport: Equestrian

William Beasley, also known as Willie Beasley, was an Irish jockey who was Champion Irish Amateur Jockey in 1881 and 1882. He was one of four brothers to ride in the Grand National in 1879, riding Lord Marcus. He died in 1892 in a riding accident.
