= Nalton Womersley =

British tennis player (1859–1930)

- Country (sports): GBR
- Born: March 1859 Stratford, Essex, England
- Died: 26 October 1930 (aged 71) Richmond, London, England
- Turned pro: 1879 (amateur tour)
- Retired: 1882

Singles
- Career record: 22–5
- Career titles: 1

Grand Slam singles results
- Wimbledon: 1R (1880)

Nalton Womersley (March 1859 – 26 October 1930) was a British tennis player active in the late 19th century. In major tournaments of the time he played at the 1880 Wimbledon Championships where he was beaten in the first round by George Butterworth. Between 1879 and 1882 he won one singles title.

== Career ==
In 1879 Nalton played and won his first tournament at the Essex County Cricket Club Tournament at Leyton, against his younger brother Dale Wormersley. In 1880 he failed to retain his Essex County Cricket Club title losing in the semi-finals.

In July 1880 he played at Wimbledon Championships where he was beaten in the first round by George Butterworth. In 1881 he was losing finalist at the Essex Championships at Brentwood, Essex. In 1882 he reached the final of the Essex Championships for the second time, but lost to Charles Walder Grinstead.

== Career finals ==
=== Singles:3 (1 titles, 2 runners-up) ===
Outcome	No.	Date	Tournament	Location	Surface	Opponent	Score
Winner	1.	1879	Essex County Cricket Club Tournament	Leyton	Grass	(United Kingdom) Dale Wormersley	6–4, 6–5
Runner-up	1.	1881	Essex Championships	Brentwood	Grass	(United Kingdom) Dale Wormersley	0–6, 4–6
Runner-up	2.	1882	Essex Championships	Brentwood	Grass	(United Kingdom) Charles Walder Grinstead	1–6, 3–6, 4–6

== Work and family ==
Nalton Womersley was the brother of fellow lawn tennis players Albert Womersley and Dale Womersley (a stockbroker by profession).
