= Earlsfort Terrace Tournament =

Defunct tennis tournament
- Founded: 1879; 146 years ago
- Abolished: 1879; 146 years ago
- Location: Earlsfort Terrace, Dublin, Ireland
- Venue: Earlsfort Terrace Skating Rink
- Surface: Hard

The Earlsfort Terrace Tournament a late Victorian era hard court tennis tournament, first staged on 28 April 1879. The tournament was held on the lawn tennis grounds Earlsfort Terrace, Dublin, Ireland. The tournament was held only one time and ended on 2 May 1879.

== History ==
The Earlsfort Terrace Tournament was hard court tennis event first staged in on 28 April 1879. This tournament was held for one edition only and appeared to have ended. This event was held at Earlsfort Terrace in central Dublin, Ireland. The singles title was won by Vere St. Leger Goold.

== Sources ==
- Carlow Sentinel. (12 April 1879) Carlow, Ireland: British Newspaper Archives.
- Irish Times. (23 April 1879) Dublin, Ireland: British Newspaper Archives.
- Nieuwland, Alex. "Edition – Earlsfort Terrace Tournament 1879". www.tennisarchives.com. Tennis Archives.
