= Dale Womersley (tennis) =

British tennis player (1860–1942)

- Country (sports): GBR
- Born: 28 July 1860; Stratford, Essex, England
- Died: 22 August 1942 (aged 82); Brentwood, Essex, England
- Turned pro: 1879 (amateur tour)
- Retired: 1882

Singles
- Career record: 25–4
- Career titles: 3

Grand Slam singles results
- Wimbledon: 2R (1880)

Dale Womersley (28 July 1860 – 22 August 1942) was a British tennis player active in the late 19th century. In major tournaments of the time he played at the 1880 Wimbledon Championships where he was beaten in the second round by William Renshaw. Between 1879 and 1882 he won three singles titles.

== Career ==
In 1879 Womersely played his first tournament at the Essex County Cricket Club Open at Leyton, where he reached the final, but lost to his brother Nalton Wormersly. In 1880 he won his first title at the Essex County Cricket Club Tournament against Richard. C. Ball. The same year he won a second title at the Devonshire Park Championships at Eastbourne.

In the summer of 1880 he played at Wimbledon Championships where he progressed to second round, but was defeated by William Renshaw. In September 1881 he competed at the South of England Championships. The same year he won his third and final title at the Essex Championships at Brentwood, Essex, defeating Champion Branfill Russell, Charles Walder Grinstead, Edward North Buxton, and finally his brother Nalton Womersley on his way to the title. He played his final singles tournament at the Essex Championships in 1882 where he failed to defend his title.

== Career finals ==
=== Singles:4 (3 titles, 1 runner-up) ===
Result	No.	Date	Tournament	Location	Surface	Opponent	Score
Loss	1.	1879	Essex CCC Open	Leyton	Grass	(United Kingdom) Nalton Womersley	4–6, 5–6
Win	2.	1880	Essex CCC Open	Leyton	Grass	(United Kingdom) R.C. Ball	2 sets to 0
Win	3.	1880	Devonshire Park Championships	Eastbourne	Grass	(United Kingdom) Frederick Brunning Maddison	6–4, 3–6, 6–2, 6–3
Win	4.	1881	Essex Championships	Brentwood	Grass	(United Kingdom) Nalton Womersley	6–0, 6–4

== Work and family ==
Dale Womersley, who was educated at Marlborough College, was the brother of fellow lawn tennis players Albert Womersley and Nalton Womersley and a stockbroker by profession. Womersley played cricket as a wicket-keeper for Essex County Cricket Club in the years before the club was promoted to first-class status in 1894. His son, also named Dale played one first-class cricket match for Essex in 1910. Womersley died at Brentwood in 1942 aged 82.
