= 1887 women's tennis season =

1887 Women's tennis season
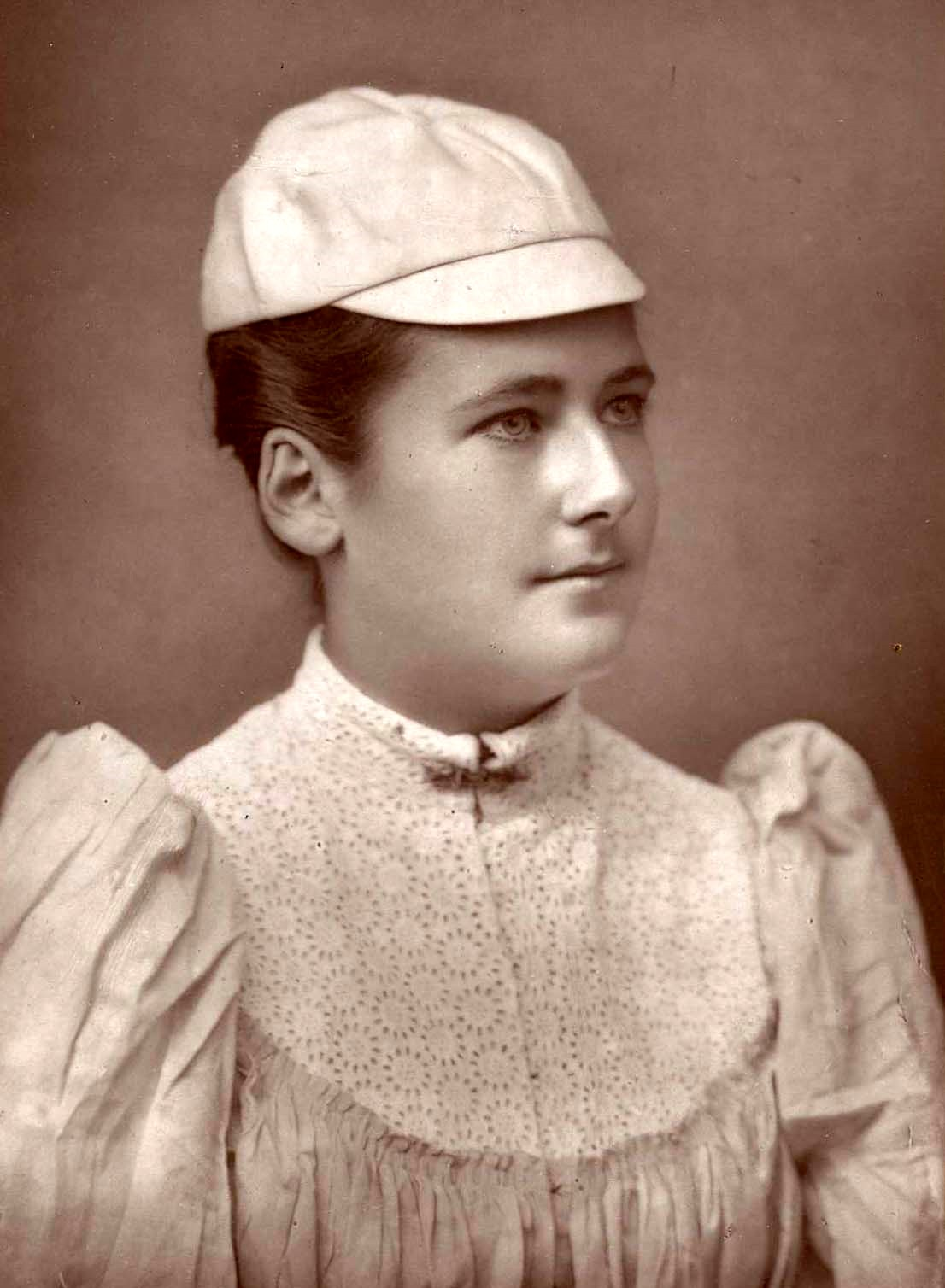
- Lottie Dod becomes the second woman to win the Irish, Northern and Wimbledon Championships in the same year, and is joint title leader.

Details
- Duration: 2 January – 24 December
- Edition: 12th
- Tournaments: 69 (singles); 100 (Inc doubles & mixed doubles)
- Categories: Major (4); National (3); Provincial/Regional/State (13); County (10); Regular (49)

Achievements (singles)
- Most titles: (England) Lottie Dod (5) (England) Margaret Bracewell (5)
- Most finals: (England) Maud Watson (7)

The 1887 Women's tennis season was a tennis circuit composed of 69 (singles) and 100 (Inc doubles and mixed doubles) national, regional, county, and regular tournaments. The season began in February in Auckland, New Zealand, and ended in December in Christchurch, New Zealand.

== Summary of season ==
From 1888 until 1912 Britain's Lawn Tennis Association (LTA), grew in status and influence to become the de facto international tennis governing body before the proper International Lawn Tennis Federation commenced operations. Despite the United States National Lawn Tennis Association (USNLTA) forming in 1881 a good seven years before the LTA, it was the British body that set laws, settled disputes and organized the increasingly complicated tournament calendar before the International Lawn Tennis Federation (ILTF) formed in March, 1913.

After the formation of the ILTF the world tennis circuit going forward was a highly organised and structured network of national and international tournaments. Most tennis tournaments were usually mixed events for men and women, and the women's international tennis circuit certainly up to 1923 was composed mainly of tournaments on the British and European Circuits. After the USNLTA joined the ILTF this would later change with more and more tournaments being staged globally. Women tennis players on the world circuit up to the open era were funded by their national associations enabling them to travel and take part in international tournaments.

1887 sees an increase in the number women's singles events being held as the tennis circuit continues to form. The 1887 women's tennis season began on 2 January with the Farndon Park Open, Hawkes Bay, New Zealand. In May 1887 at the first major event of the year the Irish Championships played at the Fitzwilliam Lawn Tennis Club in Dublin, Ireland. England's Lottie Dod wins the singles title defeating Maud Watson, she also picks up the mixed doubles title with Ernest Renshaw. The ladies doubles event is won by Louisa Martin and Florence Stanuell. In terms of draw size the West of England Championships was the largest tournament of the year with a draw of 56 across three events.

In June 1887 at the second major tournament of the year the Northern Championships played at the Northern Lawn Tennis Club in Manchester Lottie Dod collects her second major title beating Maud Watson in straights sets, the women's doubles event is won by the sister's Ann Dod and Lottie Dod who defeat a Louisa Martin and Florence Stanuell in the final in three sets, the mixed doubles event is won by Irish pair Louisa Martin and Tom Campion who defeat Lottie Dod and Harry Grove in the final.

In July at the 1887 Wimbledon Championships the world's first major tennis tournament, Lottie Dod completes a clean sweep all the British and Irish major tournaments, when she defeats defending champion Blanche Bingley in straight sets to claim her third major title.

In September at the U.S. National Championships a women's event is staged for the first time at the Philadelphia Cricket Club, PA and was played after the men's tournament had ended. 17-year-old Philadelphian Ellen Hansell became the first women's champion, defeating Laura Knight in straight sets. The season ended on 24 December 1887 at the New Zealand Championships, held in Christchurch, New Zealand played on grass.

== Season results ==
Prior to the creation of the International Lawn Tennis Federation and the establishment of its world championship events in 1913 the Wimbledon Championships, the U.S. National Championships, the Irish Lawn Tennis Championships and the Northern Championships were considered by players and historians as the four most important tennis tournaments to win.

This is a calendar of all known official events that were administered by national, regional, provincial, state, and county lawn tennis associations in the year 1887, with player progression documented from the quarterfinals stage where historical sources have permitted.

Key

Important.
National
Provincial/State/Regional
County
Regular

=== January ===
* (denotes doubles) ** (denotes mix doubles)

Ended	Tournament	Winner	Finalist	Semifinalist	Quarterfinalist
6 Jan.	Farndon Park Open; Farndon Park; Napier, New Zealand; Grass; Singles - Doubles	No Ladies Singles	No Ladies Doubles		
6 Jan.	Farndon Park Open; Farndon Park; Napier, New Zealand; Grass; Singles - Doubles	(New Zealand) Rose Tanner ** (New Zealand) J.W. Begg; 6–4, 6–0	(New Zealand) Hilda Hitchings (New Zealand) R. Smith		

=== February ===
Ended	Tournament	Winner	Finalist	Semifinalist	Quarterfinalist
21 Feb.	Auckland Association Championships; Farndon Park; Auckland, New Zealand; Grass; Singles - Doubles	(New Zealand) Miss Mowbray; 2–6, 6–2, 6–4	(New Zealand) E. Morse		

=== March ===
Ended	Tournament	Winner	Finalist	Semi finalist	Quarter finalist
14 Mar.	Cannes Beau Site Hotel Tournament; Beau Site Hotel; Cannes, France; Clay; Singles - Doubles	No Ladies Singles	No Ladies Doubles		
14 Mar.	Cannes Beau Site Hotel Tournament; Beau Site Hotel; Cannes, France; Clay; Singles - Doubles	(England) Constance Bryan ** (England) Ernest Renshaw; 6–4, 13–11	(England) Edith Gurney (England) Harry Grove		
19 March.	Southern California Championships (Spring Edition); Casa Blanca Club; Riverside, United States; Asphalt; Singles - Doubles	(United States) Grace Gilliland; Won	(United States) Mrs. G. L. Waring		

=== April ===
No events

=== May ===
Ended	Tournament	Winner	Finalist	Semi finalist	Quarter finalist
1 May.	Ceylon Championships; The Hill Club; Nuwara Eliya, Ceylon; Clay; Singles - Doubles	(Dominion of Ceylon) Isa Watson; 4–6, 6–1, 6–2	(Dominion of Ceylon) Miss Bayley		
9 May.	Inter-Colonial Lawn Tennis Tournament (Championship of New South Wales); Sydney, Australia; Asphalt; Singles - Doubles	(Australia) EM Mayne; 6–4, 6–4	(Australia) C. Greene	(Australia) Mabel Shaw (Australia) Ada Rodd	(Australia) Eliza Fitzgerald (Australia) Constance Raleigh
9 May.	Inter-Colonial Lawn Tennis Tournament (Championship of New South Wales); Sydney, Australia; Asphalt; Singles - Doubles	(Australia) Lil Scott (Australia) Zilla Scott; 3–6, 6–4, 6–3	(Australia) C. Greene (Australia) Constance Raleigh	(Australia) Mabel Shaw (Australia) Ada Rodd	(Australia) Eliza Fitzgerald (Australia) Constance Raleigh
9 May.	Inter-Colonial Lawn Tennis Tournament (Championship of New South Wales); Sydney, Australia; Asphalt; Singles - Doubles	(Australia) C. Greene (Australia) Dudley Webb; 6–4, 6–2	(Australia) Eliza Fitzgerald (Australia) Robert Fitzgerald	(Australia) Mabel Shaw (Australia) Ada Rodd	(Australia) Eliza Fitzgerald (Australia) Constance Raleigh
21 May.	West of Scotland Championships; Pollockshields Athletic Club; Pollokshields, Scotland; Grass; Singles - Doubles	(Scotland) Julia MacKenzie; 6-0 10-8	(England) Miss Blackburn		
21 May.	West of Scotland Championships; Pollockshields Athletic Club; Pollokshields, Scotland; Grass; Singles - Doubles	(Scotland) Julia MacKenzie (Scotland) Miss Robertson; 6–2, 6–3	(England) Miss Blackburn (United Kingdom) Miss Rodger		
28 May.	Irish Championships; Fitzwilliam LTC; Dublin, Ireland; Grass; Singles - Doubles	(England) Lottie Dod; 6-4, 6-3	(England) Maud Watson	(Ireland) Louisa Martin (England) Lillian Watson	(Ireland) Connie Butler (Ireland) Miss McClintock (Ireland) Miss Exham (Ireland) Florence Stanuell
28 May.	Irish Championships; Fitzwilliam LTC; Dublin, Ireland; Grass; Singles - Doubles	(Ireland) Louisa Martin (Ireland) Florence Stanuell; 4–6, 6–4, 6–4	(England) Lillian Watson (England) Maud Watson	(Ireland) Louisa Martin (England) Lillian Watson	(Ireland) Connie Butler (Ireland) Miss McClintock (Ireland) Miss Exham (Ireland) Florence Stanuell
28 May.	Irish Championships; Fitzwilliam LTC; Dublin, Ireland; Grass; Singles - Doubles	(England) Lottie Dod (England) Ernest Renshaw; 8–6, 5–7, 6–1, 6–3	(England) Maud Watson (England) Harry Grove	(Ireland) Louisa Martin (England) Lillian Watson	(Ireland) Connie Butler (Ireland) Miss McClintock (Ireland) Miss Exham (Ireland) Florence Stanuell
30 May.	Berrylands Club Tournament; Berrylands LTC; Surbiton, England; Singles - Doubles	No Ladies Singles	No Ladies Doubles		
30 May.	Berrylands Club Tournament; Berrylands LTC; Surbiton, England; Singles - Doubles	(England) Harry Barlow (England) Miss Ripley; 1–6, 6–5, 10–8	(United Kingdom) Lucy Ripley (United Kingdom) Herbert Ripley		
31 May.	Rotherby Invitation; Rotherby Hall Estate; Rotherby, England; Singles - Doubles				
31 May.	Rotherby Invitation; Rotherby Hall Estate; Rotherby, England; Singles - Doubles	(United Kingdom) Mrs Jacques (United Kingdom) Effie Noon; 1–6, 6–3, 6–3	(United Kingdom) Florence Noon (United Kingdom) Miss Turner		
31 May.	Rotherby Invitation; Rotherby Hall Estate; Rotherby, England; Singles - Doubles	(United Kingdom) Florence Noon (United Kingdom) Alfred E. Thompson; 6–2, 5–7, 8–6	(United Kingdom) Effie Noon (United Kingdom) Conway John Morgan		

=== June ===
Ended	Tournament	Winner	Finalist	Semi finalist	Quarter finalist
3 Jun.	Championship of West of England; Lansdown Cricket Club; Bath, England; Grass; Singles - Doubles	(England) Lottie Dod; 7–5, 6–4	(England) Maud Watson	(United Kingdom) N. Pope (Ireland) Beatrice Langrishe	(United Kingdom) Margaret Bracewell (England) Miss Hornby (Scotland) Lottie Paterson (England) Miss Wilder
3 Jun.	Championship of West of England; Lansdown Cricket Club; Bath, England; Grass; Singles - Doubles	(England) Ann Dod (England) Lottie Dod; 10–8, 6–3	(England) Lillian Watson (England) Maud Watson	(United Kingdom) N. Pope (Ireland) Beatrice Langrishe	(United Kingdom) Margaret Bracewell (England) Miss Hornby (Scotland) Lottie Paterson (England) Miss Wilder
3 Jun.	Championship of West of England; Lansdown Cricket Club; Bath, England; Grass; Singles - Doubles	(England) Lottie Dod (United States) James Dwight; 6–4, 4–6, 6–1	(United Kingdom) Margaret Bracewell (England) William Renshaw–	(United Kingdom) N. Pope (Ireland) Beatrice Langrishe	(United Kingdom) Margaret Bracewell (England) Miss Hornby (Scotland) Lottie Paterson (England) Miss Wilder
4 Jun.	Whitehouse Open; Whitehouse LTC; Edinburgh, Scotland; Clay; Singles - Doubles	(England) Mabel Boulton walkover	(Scotland) Jane Meikle		
4 Jun.	Whitehouse Open; Whitehouse LTC; Edinburgh, Scotland; Clay; Singles - Doubles	(England) Dorothy Boulton (England) Mabel Boulton; 1–6, 6–4, 6–3	(Scotland) A. Forest (Scotland) Miss Meikle		
4 Jun.	Whitehouse Open; Whitehouse LTC; Edinburgh, Scotland; Clay; Singles - Doubles	(England) Dorothy Boulton (Scotland) John Galbraith Horn; 6–2, 3–6, 12–10	(England) Mabel Boulton (Scotland) Richard Millar Watson		
11 Jun	Scottish Championships; Dyvour Club; Edinburgh, Scotland; Grass; Singles - Doubles	(Ireland) Connie Butler; 6–2, 6–2, 3–6, 8–6	(England) Dorothy Boulton	(Scotland) Miss Meikle (Scotland) Lottie Paterson	(Scotland) A. Forest (Scotland) Miss Moreton (Scotland) Jane Meikle
11 Jun	Scottish Championships; Dyvour Club; Edinburgh, Scotland; Grass; Singles - Doubles	Challenger (England) Mabel Boulton		(Scotland) Miss Meikle (Scotland) Lottie Paterson	(Scotland) A. Forest (Scotland) Miss Moreton (Scotland) Jane Meikle
11 Jun.	East Gloucestershire Championship Challenge Cup; Cheltenham LTC; Grass; Cheltenham, England; Singles - Doubles	(Ireland) Louisa Martin; 6–4, 5–7, 6–2	(England) Maud Watson	(United Kingdom) Margaret Bracewell (Ireland) Florence Stanuell	(England) Edith Davies (England) Florence Mardall (Ireland) Beatrice Langrishe (England) Lillian Watson
11 Jun.	East Gloucestershire Championship Challenge Cup; Cheltenham LTC; Grass; Cheltenham, England; Singles - Doubles	(England) Lillian Watson (England) Maud Watson; 6–4, 6–1	(Ireland) Louisa Martin (Ireland) Florence Stanuell	(United Kingdom) Margaret Bracewell (Ireland) Florence Stanuell	(England) Edith Davies (England) Florence Mardall (Ireland) Beatrice Langrishe (England) Lillian Watson
11 Jun.	East Gloucestershire Championship Challenge Cup; Cheltenham LTC; Grass; Cheltenham, England; Singles - Doubles	(England) Maud Watson (England) John Redfern Deykin; 6–4, 6–3	(United Kingdom) Margaret Bracewell (United States) James Dwight	(United Kingdom) Margaret Bracewell (Ireland) Florence Stanuell	(England) Edith Davies (England) Florence Mardall (Ireland) Beatrice Langrishe (England) Lillian Watson
17 Jun.	Welsh Championships; Penarth LTC; Penarth, Wales; Grass; Singles - Doubles	(England) Maud Watson; 6–3, 6–3	(Ireland) Beatrice Langrishe	(England) Miss Cockshott (England) Lillian Watson	(England) Clara Hill (Wales) E. Stephens
17 Jun.	Welsh Championships; Penarth LTC; Penarth, Wales; Grass; Singles - Doubles	(England) Lilian Watson (United Kingdom) James Baldwin; 3–6, 6–2, 6–1	(England) Maud Watson (England) Ernest Renshaw	(England) Miss Cockshott (England) Lillian Watson	(England) Clara Hill (Wales) E. Stephens
18 Jun	London Championships; London Athletic Club; London, England; Grass; Singles - Doubles	(England) Blanche Hillyard; 6–4, 6–3	(England) May Jacks	(Scotland) L. Murray (England) A. Tulloch	(England) Mrs Anderson (England) E. Bushell (England) Florence Renwick (England) Lois Renwick
18 Jun	London Championships; London Athletic Club; London, England; Grass; Singles - Doubles	Challenger (England) Bernice James		(Scotland) L. Murray (England) A. Tulloch	(England) Mrs Anderson (England) E. Bushell (England) Florence Renwick (England) Lois Renwick
18 Jun.	Waterloo Tournament; Waterloo, England; Grass; Singles - Doubles	(England) Miss Pickthall; 7–5, 6–1	(England) M. Pick		
18 Jun.	Waterloo Tournament; Waterloo, England; Grass; Singles - Doubles	(England) K. Pick (United Kingdom) Jacob Gaitskill Brown; 6–2, 9–7	(England) F. Bromfield (United Kingdom) JD Harris		
20 Jun	Headingley Tournament; Headingley LTC; Headingley, England; Grass; Singles - Doubles	(England) Beatrice Wood; 6–3, 6–2	(England) G. Harrison		
25 Jun.	Northern Championships; Northern LTC; Manchester, England; Grass; Singles - Doubles	(England) Lottie Dod; 6–1, 6–2	(United Kingdom) Margaret Bracewell	(Ireland) May Langrishe (Ireland) Florence Stanuell	(Ireland) Connie Butler (England) Edith Davies (England) Florence Mardall (Ireland) Louisa Martin
25 Jun.	Northern Championships; Northern LTC; Manchester, England; Grass; Singles - Doubles	Challenger (England) Maud Watson		(Ireland) May Langrishe (Ireland) Florence Stanuell	(Ireland) Connie Butler (England) Edith Davies (England) Florence Mardall (Ireland) Louisa Martin
25 Jun.	Northern Championships; Northern LTC; Manchester, England; Grass; Singles - Doubles	(England) Ann Dod (England) Lottie Dod; 6–4, 2–6, 6–3	(Ireland) Louisa Martin (Ireland) Florence Stanuell	(Ireland) May Langrishe (Ireland) Florence Stanuell	(Ireland) Connie Butler (England) Edith Davies (England) Florence Mardall (Ireland) Louisa Martin
25 Jun.	Northern Championships; Northern LTC; Manchester, England; Grass; Singles - Doubles	(Ireland) Louisa Martin (Ireland) Tom Campion; 8–6, 6–3	(England) Lottie Dod (England) Harry Grove	(Ireland) May Langrishe (Ireland) Florence Stanuell	(Ireland) Connie Butler (England) Edith Davies (England) Florence Mardall (Ireland) Louisa Martin
25 Jun.	Kent All-Comers' Championships; Beckenham LTC; Beckenham, England; Grass; Singles - Doubles	No Ladies Singles	No Ladies Doubles		
25 Jun.	Kent All-Comers' Championships; Beckenham LTC; Beckenham, England; Grass; Singles - Doubles	(England) Miss Barlow (England) Harry Sibthorpe Barlow; 7–5, 4–6, 6–1	(England) May Jacks (England) HC Yockney		

=== July ===
Ended	Tournament	Winner	Finalist	Semi finalist	Quarter finalist
1 Jul	Natal Championships; Pietermaritzburg, Colony of Natal; Grass; Singles - Doubles	(Colony of Natal) Mabel Grant; 6–4, 6–3	(Colony of Natal) L. Button		
2 Jul.	Midland Counties Championships; Edgbaston CLTC; Edgbaston, England; Grass; Singles - Doubles	(United Kingdom) Margaret Bracewell; 6-0 4-6 7-5	(United Kingdom) Miss Mardall	(United Kingdom) Eva Steedman (United Kingdom) Mary Steedman	
2 Jul.	Midland Counties Championships; Edgbaston CLTC; Edgbaston, England; Grass; Singles - Doubles	(United Kingdom) Margaret Bracewell (England) Florence Mardall; 6-4 7-5	(United Kingdom) Bertha Steedman (United Kingdom) Mary Steedman	(United Kingdom) Eva Steedman (United Kingdom) Mary Steedman	
2 Jul.	Midland Counties Championships; Edgbaston CLTC; Edgbaston, England; Grass; Singles - Doubles	(United Kingdom) Margaret Bracewell (United Kingdom) John Redfern Deykin; 6-4 11-9	(United Kingdom) Bertha Steedman (United Kingdom) Percy Bateman Brown	(United Kingdom) Eva Steedman (United Kingdom) Mary Steedman	
7 Jul.	Wimbledon Championships; AELTC; London, England; Outdoor; Grass; Singles - Doubles	(England) Lottie Dod; 6–2, 6–0	(England) Edith Cole	(England) Amy Tabor (England) Lilian Watson	(United Kingdom) AM Chambers (United Kingdom) Julia Mackenzie (United Kingdom) FM Pearson (United Kingdom) J Shackle
7 Jul.	Wimbledon Championships; AELTC; London, England; Outdoor; Grass; Singles - Doubles	Challenger (England) Blanche Hillyard		(England) Amy Tabor (England) Lilian Watson	(United Kingdom) AM Chambers (United Kingdom) Julia Mackenzie (United Kingdom) FM Pearson (United Kingdom) J Shackle
9 Jul.	Chapel Allerton LTC Tournament; Chapel Allerton LTC; Chapel Allerton, England; Grass; Singles - Doubles	(England) Beatrice Wood; 6–3, 5–6, 6–5	(United Kingdom) Lilla Moir		
9 Jul.	Chapel Allerton LTC Tournament; Chapel Allerton LTC; Chapel Allerton, England; Grass; Singles - Doubles	(England) M. Crossley (England) Beatrice Wood; 4–6, 5–7, 6–4, 6–4, 7–5	(United Kingdom) Lilla Moir (England) E. Tannett		
14 Jul.	Leamington Open Tournament; Leamington Spa, England; Grass; Singles - Doubles	(United Kingdom) Evelyn Blencowe; 6–1, 6–1	(United Kingdom) Gertrude Mellersh		
14 Jul.	Leamington Open Tournament; Leamington Spa, England; Grass; Singles - Doubles	(United Kingdom) Margaret Bracewell (United States) James Dwight; 6-4 4-6 6-0	(United Kingdom) Mrs Hornby (United Kingdom) AD Annesley		
16 Jul.	Leicester Open Lawn Tennis Tournament; Leicester, England; Grass; Singles - Doubles	(United Kingdom) Margaret Bracewell; 6–4, 6–2	(United Kingdom) Effie Noon	(United Kingdom) Florence Noon (England) Florence Mardall	(England) Miss Forsbroke (United Kingdom) Agnes Noon Watts
16 Jul.	Leicester Open Lawn Tennis Tournament; Leicester, England; Grass; Singles - Doubles	(United Kingdom) N. Pope (United Kingdom) Agnes Noon Watts; 6–5, 6–5	(United Kingdom) Margaret Bracewell (United Kingdom) Miss Forsbroke	(United Kingdom) Florence Noon (England) Florence Mardall	(England) Miss Forsbroke (United Kingdom) Agnes Noon Watts
16 Jul.	Leicester Open Lawn Tennis Tournament; Leicester, England; Grass; Singles - Doubles	(United Kingdom) Margaret Bracewell (United Kingdom) Ernest Lewis; 6–1, 6–1	(United Kingdom) Florence Noon (United Kingdom) CP Brett	(United Kingdom) Florence Noon (England) Florence Mardall	(England) Miss Forsbroke (United Kingdom) Agnes Noon Watts
16 Jul.	Armagh Lawn Tennis Tournament; Archery LTC; Armagh, Ireland; Asphalt; Singles - Doubles	(Ireland) Doireann Boyle; 6–3, 6–2	(England) Lavinia Chambers		
16 Jul.	Armagh Lawn Tennis Tournament; Archery LTC; Armagh, Ireland; Asphalt; Singles - Doubles	(England) Lavinia Chambers (Ireland) Rory Maunsell; 2–0 sets	(Ireland) Doireann Boyle (Ireland) Harold Hardyman		
21 Jul	Taunton and West Somerset Lawn Tennis Tournament; Taunton, England; Grass; Singles - Doubles	(United Kingdom) N. Pope; 6–1, 6–1	(United Kingdom) A.M. Meyler		
21 Jul	Taunton and West Somerset Lawn Tennis Tournament; Taunton, England; Grass; Singles - Doubles	(United Kingdom) Alice Bagnall-Wild (United Kingdom) N. Pope; 6–4, 6–1	(United Kingdom) Miss Escott (United Kingdom) Miss Gilling-Lax		
21 Jul	Norton Lawn Tennis Open Tournament; Norton Cricket Club Grounds; Norton, England; Grass; Singles - Doubles	(England) Miss Marley; 6–5, 6–1	(England) Katharine Faithfull	(England) Elizabeth Faithfull (England) Ellinor Page	(England) Miss Bolckow (England) Ethel Cochrane (England) Catherine Faithfull (England) Miss Page
23 Jul.	Middlesex Championships; Chiswick, England; Grass; Singles - Doubles	(England) D Patterson; 6–0, 4–6, 7–5	(England) Edith Gurney	(England) Miss Canning (England) Jemima Gray	(England) Beatrice James (England) May Jacks (England) Miss Isabel Monckton (England) Margaret Rundall
23 Jul.	Middlesex Championships; Chiswick, England; Grass; Singles - Doubles	(England) Miss Gray (Scotland) Lottie Paterson; 6–4, 6–1	(England) May Jacks (United Kingdom) B James	(England) Miss Canning (England) Jemima Gray	(England) Beatrice James (England) May Jacks (England) Miss Isabel Monckton (England) Margaret Rundall
23 Jul.	Middlesex Championships; Chiswick, England; Grass; Singles - Doubles	(England) Blanche Hillyard (England) George Hillyard; 6–1, 6–0	(England) May Jacks	(England) Miss Canning (England) Jemima Gray	(England) Beatrice James (England) May Jacks (England) Miss Isabel Monckton (England) Margaret Rundall
23 Jul.	Ealing LTC Championship; Ealing LTC; Ealing, England; Grass; Singles - Doubles	(United Kingdom) Charlotte Cooper; 6–4, 5–7, 6–4	(United Kingdom) Alice Brown	(England) Edith Gurney (United Kingdom) Bertha Steedman	
23 Jul.	Staffordshire Lawn Tennis Tournament; Stafford Institute LTC; Stafford, England; Grass; Singles - Doubles	(England) Effie Noon; 2–6, 6–2, 8–6	(United Kingdom) Miss Crofton		
23 Jul.	Staffordshire Lawn Tennis Tournament; Stafford Institute LTC; Stafford, England; Grass; Singles - Doubles	(England) Effie Noon (United Kingdom) CP Brett; 6–3, 1–6, 6–3	(United Kingdom) Frederick Watts (United Kingdom) Agnes Noon Watts		
30 Jul	Northumberland County Association Tournament. Newcastle, England; Grass; Singles - Doubles	(Ireland) Connie Butler; 4–6, 6–2, 8–6	(England) Ann Dod	(England) Alice Cheese (England) A. Reay	(England) Mrs R. Clayton (England) Helen Jackson (England) L. Wilson
30 Jul	Northumberland County Association Tournament. Newcastle, England; Grass; Singles - Doubles	(England) Helen Jackson (United Kingdom) John Charles Kay	(United Kingdom) Miss Bradshaw (United Kingdom) Herbert Wilberforce	(England) Alice Cheese (England) A. Reay	(England) Mrs R. Clayton (England) Helen Jackson (England) L. Wilson
30 Jul	Portishead Open Lawn Tennis Tournament; Portishead, England; Grass; Singles - Doubles	No Ladies Singles			
30 Jul	Portishead Open Lawn Tennis Tournament; Portishead, England; Grass; Singles - Doubles	(United Kingdom) Miss Bryant (United Kingdom) Winifred Parr; 6–0, 6–3	(United Kingdom) Miss Reynolds (United Kingdom) F. Smith		
30 Jul	Portishead Open Lawn Tennis Tournament; Portishead, England; Grass; Singles - Doubles	> (United Kingdom) Alice Parr (England) Ernest Renshaw walkover	(United Kingdom) Miss Stock (United Kingdom) J.C. Prior		
30 Jul	Derbyshire Championships; Buxton, England; Grass; Singles - Doubles	(Ireland) May Langrishe; 6–3, 6–4	(United Kingdom) Bertha Steedman	(United Kingdom) Margaret Bracewell (Ireland) Beatrice Langrishe	(England) Katherine Hill (United Kingdom) Eva Steedman (United Kingdom) Mary Steedman (England) Beatrice Wood
30 Jul	Derbyshire Championships; Buxton, England; Grass; Singles - Doubles	(England) Lottie Dod (Ireland) May Langrishe; 6–1, 6–2	(United Kingdom) Gertrude Bracewell (United Kingdom) Margaret Bracewell	(United Kingdom) Margaret Bracewell (Ireland) Beatrice Langrishe	(England) Katherine Hill (United Kingdom) Eva Steedman (United Kingdom) Mary Steedman (England) Beatrice Wood
30 Jul	Derbyshire Championships; Buxton, England; Grass; Singles - Doubles	(England) Lottie Dod (United States) James Dwight; 6–4, 4–6, 6–2	(Ireland) May Langrishe (Ireland) William Drumond Hamilton	(United Kingdom) Margaret Bracewell (Ireland) Beatrice Langrishe	(England) Katherine Hill (United Kingdom) Eva Steedman (United Kingdom) Mary Steedman (England) Beatrice Wood
30 Jul	Essex County Cricket Club Tournament; Essex CCC; Leyton, England; Grass; Singles - Doubles	(England) Brenda James; 6–8, 6–0, 6–3	(England) May Jacks	(England) Clara Hill (England) Florence Thompson	
30 Jul	Essex Championships; Essex CCC; Leyton, England; Grass; Singles - Doubles	(England) Brenda James; 6–8, 6–2, 6–4	(England) May Jacks	(England) Clara Hill (England) Florence Thompson	

=== August ===
Ended	Tournament	Winner	Finalist	Semi finalist	Quarter finalist
1 August	White Sulphur Springs Tournament; White Sulphur Springs, United States; Singles - Doubles	(United States) Margie Pettet; Won	(United States) Mary Cullen	(United States) Miss Coggill (United States) Mrs Pettit	
2 Aug	East of Ireland Championships; Howth LTC; Howth, Ireland; Grass; Singles - Doubles	(England) Miss Smith; 6–2, 6–4	(Ireland) C. McClintock	(Ireland) G. Crofton (Ireland) E. Lindsay	(Ireland) P. Costello (Ireland) Mrs Graham (Ireland) E. Knox (England) Maud Scovell
2 Aug	East of Ireland Championships; Howth LTC; Howth, Ireland; Grass; Singles - Doubles	(Ireland) G. Crofton (England) Maxwell J. Carpendale; 7–5, 6–4	(England) Maud Scovell (Ireland) Cameron Deane Shute	(Ireland) G. Crofton (Ireland) E. Lindsay	(Ireland) P. Costello (Ireland) Mrs Graham (Ireland) E. Knox (England) Maud Scovell
5 Aug	Darlington Association Tournament; Darlington, England; Singles - Doubles	(England) Helen Jackson walkover	(United Kingdom) M. Cheese		
5 Aug	Darlington Association Tournament; Darlington, England; Singles - Doubles	(England) Ann Dod (England) Helen Jackson; 6–1, 6–3	(Ireland) Connie Butler (United Kingdom) Miss Marley		
5 Aug	Darlington Association Tournament; Darlington, England; Singles - Doubles	(Ireland) Connie Butler (United Kingdom) Herbert Wilberforce; 6–4, 6–4	(England) Ann Dod (Scotland) John Galbraith Horn		
6 Aug	Exmouth Lawn Tennis Club Tournament; Exmouth LTC; Exmouth, England; Grass; Singles - Doubles	(England) Blanche Hillyard; 6–4, 6–4	(England) Maud Watson	(England) Constance Bryan (England) Lilian Watson	(England) Georgina Kindersley (Ireland) Beatrice Langrishe (United Kingdom) Effie Noon
6 Aug	Exmouth Lawn Tennis Club Tournament; Exmouth LTC; Exmouth, England; Grass; Singles - Doubles	(United Kingdom) Miss Noon (United Kingdom) James Baldwin; 6–4, 2–6, 6–4	(England) Blanche Hillyard (England) George Hillyard	(England) Constance Bryan (England) Lilian Watson	(England) Georgina Kindersley (Ireland) Beatrice Langrishe (United Kingdom) Effie Noon
6 Aug	East Grinstead Lawn Tennis Tournament; East Grinstead, England; Grass; Singles - Doubles	(United Kingdom) Miss Cobbold; 6–3, 6–3	(England) May Arbuthnot		
6 Aug	East Grinstead Lawn Tennis Tournament; East Grinstead, England; Grass; Singles - Doubles	(United Kingdom) Miss Cobbold (United Kingdom) William N. Cobbold; 6–1, 4–6, 6–4	(England) May Arbuthnot (United Kingdom) William J. Down		
6 Aug	Nottinghamshire LTA Tournament; Trent Bridge Ground; Nottingham, England; Grass; Singles - Doubles	(United Kingdom) Frances Snook; 6–3, 6–1	(United Kingdom) G. Johnson	(United Kingdom) LB Snook (United Kingdom) Sybil Speed	(United Kingdom) A. Herbert (United Kingdom) Jane Snook
6 Aug	Nottinghamshire LTA Tournament; Trent Bridge Ground; Nottingham, England; Grass; Singles - Doubles	(United Kingdom) Louise Snook (United Kingdom) Herbert D. Snook; 4–6, 6–2 retd.	(United Kingdom) Miss Wadsworth (United Kingdom) J. Douglas	(United Kingdom) LB Snook (United Kingdom) Sybil Speed	(United Kingdom) A. Herbert (United Kingdom) Jane Snook
6 Aug	Waterford Open Tournament; Rocklands Cricket Club; Waterford, Ireland; Grass; Singles	(Ireland) P. Knox; 4–6, 6–4, 6–2	(Ireland) T. Knox		
8 Aug	Ilkley Open Tournament; Ilkley LTC; Ilkley, England; Grass; Singles - Doubles	(England) Beatrice Wood; 3–6, 7–5, 6–1	(England) L. Chatterton-Clarke		
12 Aug.	Kilkenny County and City Tournament; Kilkenny, Ireland; Grass; Singles - Doubles	(Ireland) Jennie Power; 6–8, 6–4, 4–6, 6–2, 7–5	(Ireland) E. McCheane		
12 Aug.	Kilkenny County and City Tournament; Kilkenny, Ireland; Grass; Singles - Doubles	(Ireland) Miss Rotheram (Ireland) Plunkett Greene; 6–4, 3–6, 6–2	(Ireland) A.F. Gregory (Ireland) Francis Slade-Gully		
13 Aug	Teignmouth and Shaldon Open; East Devon & Teignmouth LTC; Teignmouth, England; Grass; Singles - Doubles	No Ladies Singles	No Ladies Double		
13 Aug	Teignmouth and Shaldon Open; East Devon & Teignmouth LTC; Teignmouth, England; Grass; Singles - Doubles	(England) Maud Watson (United Kingdom) Ernest Wool Lewis; 6–2, 6–0	(Ireland) Beatrice Langrishe (United Kingdom) Wilfred Milne		
13 Aug	Hull Westbourne Avenue Open Tournament; Hull, England; Grass; Singles - Doubles	(United Kingdom) Constance Hodgson; 3–6, 6–4, 6–3	(United Kingdom) Angel Smith		
20 Aug	Yorkshire Association and County Open Tournament; West Cliff LTC; Whitby, England; Grass; Singles - Doubles	(United Kingdom) Margaret Bracewell; 4–6, 6–2, 6–0	(United Kingdom) M. Crossley	(England) Mabel Boulton (United Kingdom) A. Turner	(Ireland) L. Chatterton-Clarke (England) Florence Mardall (Scotland) A.S. Petrie (England) Beatrice Wood
20 Aug	Yorkshire Association and County Open Tournament; West Cliff LTC; Whitby, England; Grass; Singles - Doubles	Challenger (United Kingdom) Ethel Atkinson		(England) Mabel Boulton (United Kingdom) A. Turner	(Ireland) L. Chatterton-Clarke (England) Florence Mardall (Scotland) A.S. Petrie (England) Beatrice Wood
20 Aug	Yorkshire Association and County Open Tournament; West Cliff LTC; Whitby, England; Grass; Singles - Doubles	(United Kingdom) Margaret Bracewell (England) Florence Mardall; 6–2, 6–4	(United Kingdom) Ethel Atkinson (United Kingdom) Ella Rawlinson	(England) Mabel Boulton (United Kingdom) A. Turner	(Ireland) L. Chatterton-Clarke (England) Florence Mardall (Scotland) A.S. Petrie (England) Beatrice Wood
20 Aug	Yorkshire Association and County Open Tournament; West Cliff LTC; Whitby, England; Grass; Singles - Doubles	(United Kingdom) Margaret Bracewell (United Kingdom) FJ Hirst; 8–6, 6–3	(United Kingdom) G. Walters (United Kingdom) M. Pole	(England) Mabel Boulton (United Kingdom) A. Turner	(Ireland) L. Chatterton-Clarke (England) Florence Mardall (Scotland) A.S. Petrie (England) Beatrice Wood
20 Aug	Yorkshire Association County Closed TournamentYorkshire Post and Leeds Intelligencer (22 August 1887); West Cliff LTC; Whitby, England; Grass; Singles - Doubles	(England) Beatrice Wood; 7–5, 5–7, 6–0	(England) Mabel Boulton		
20 Aug	Torquay Lawn Tennis Tournament; Torquay LTC; Torquay, England; Grass; Singles - Doubles	(England) Blanche Hillyard; 4–6, 6–2, 6–3	(England) Maud Watson	(England) E. Parson (England) Mrs Last-Smith	(England) Miss Challenor (England) Miss Newland (England) Miss Tickell
20 Aug	Torquay Lawn Tennis Tournament; Torquay LTC; Torquay, England; Grass; Singles - Doubles	(England) Maud Watson (United Kingdom) Ernest Wool Lewis; 6–0, 6–2	(United Kingdom) Miss Tickell (United Kingdom) Wilfred Milne	(England) E. Parson (England) Mrs Last-Smith	(England) Miss Challenor (England) Miss Newland (England) Miss Tickell
20 Aug	South Saxons Open Tournament; Glynde Park; Grass; St Leonards-on-Sea, England; Singles - Doubles	(United Kingdom) C. Smith; 6–5, 6–2	(United Kingdom) E. King		
24 Aug	South of Scotland Championships; Beechgrove LTC; Moffat, Scotland; Grass; Singles - Doubles	(England) Ann Dod; 6–2, 6–4	(Scotland) Lottie Paterson		
24 Aug	South of Scotland Championships; Beechgrove LTC; Moffat, Scotland; Grass; Singles - Doubles	(England) Ann Dod (Scotland) Lottie Paterson; 6–3, 6–2	(Scotland) Miss Meikle (Scotland) L. Murray		
24 Aug	South of Scotland Championships; Beechgrove LTC; Moffat, Scotland; Grass; Singles - Doubles	(England) Ann Dod (Scotland) Richard Millar Watson; 6-2, 6–1	(Scotland) Lottie Paterson (England) BH Smith		
25 Aug	Saxmundham LTC Tournament; Hurts Hall Park; Saxmundham, England; Grass; Singles - Doubles	(United Kingdom) Kate Barkley; 6–2, 6–4	(Wales) Edith Austin		
25 Aug	Saxmundham LTC Tournament; Hurts Hall Park; Saxmundham, England; Grass; Singles - Doubles	(United Kingdom) J. Bond (United Kingdom) L. Davy; 3–6, 6–2, 6–3	(United Kingdom) E. Henderson (United Kingdom) G. Henderson		
25 Aug	Saxmundham LTC Tournament; Hurts Hall Park; Saxmundham, England; Grass; Singles - Doubles	(Wales) Edith Austin (United Kingdom) Benjamin A. Cohen; 6–5, 6–2	(United Kingdom) Kate Barkley (United Kingdom) TK Norman		
27 Aug	North of England Championships; South Cliff LTC; Scarborough, England; Grass; Singles - Doubles	(United Kingdom) Margaret Bracewell; 6–0, 6–1	(England) Beatrice Wood	(England) Florence Mardall (United Kingdom) Mary Steedman	(Ireland) Connie Butler (England) Mabel Boulton (England) Miss Clark (United Kingdom) B. Hopkinson
27 Aug	North of England Championships; South Cliff LTC; Scarborough, England; Grass; Singles - Doubles	Challenger (England) Ann Dod		(England) Florence Mardall (United Kingdom) Mary Steedman	(Ireland) Connie Butler (England) Mabel Boulton (England) Miss Clark (United Kingdom) B. Hopkinson
27 Aug	North of England Championships; South Cliff LTC; Scarborough, England; Grass; Singles - Doubles	(United Kingdom) Bertha Steedman (United Kingdom) Mary Steedman; 5–7, 6–1, 6–2	(United Kingdom) Margaret Bracewell (England) Florence Mardall	(England) Florence Mardall (United Kingdom) Mary Steedman	(Ireland) Connie Butler (England) Mabel Boulton (England) Miss Clark (United Kingdom) B. Hopkinson
27 Aug	North of England Championships; South Cliff LTC; Scarborough, England; Grass; Singles - Doubles	(United Kingdom) Margaret Bracewell (United Kingdom) Harry Grove; 6–2, 4–6, 6–2	(United Kingdom) Mary Steedman (United Kingdom) F Bradbury	(England) Florence Mardall (United Kingdom) Mary Steedman	(Ireland) Connie Butler (England) Mabel Boulton (England) Miss Clark (United Kingdom) B. Hopkinson
30 Aug	Bournemouth Lawn Tennis Club Tournament; Dean Park; Bournemouth, England; Grass; Singles - Doubles	(England) Constance Bryan; 6–1, 6–3	(Ireland) Beatrice Langrishe	(England) Mrs Hornby (United Kingdom) Mrs Surman	(England) M. Champneys (England) H. Mellersh (Scotland) A. McWilliam (England) Miss Urquhart
30 Aug	Bournemouth Lawn Tennis Club Tournament; Dean Park; Bournemouth, England; Grass; Singles - Doubles	(England) Constance Bryan (Ireland) Beatrice Langrishe; 6–1, 6–3	(United Kingdom) Miss Elphinstone (United Kingdom) Mrs Surman	(England) Mrs Hornby (United Kingdom) Mrs Surman	(England) M. Champneys (England) H. Mellersh (Scotland) A. McWilliam (England) Miss Urquhart
30 Aug	Bournemouth Lawn Tennis Club Tournament; Dean Park; Bournemouth, England; Grass; Singles - Doubles	(England) Constance Bryan (England) Ernest Wool Lewis; 6–3, 6–3, 6–4	(Ireland) Beatrice Langrishe (England) Ernest Renshaw	(England) Mrs Hornby (United Kingdom) Mrs Surman	(England) M. Champneys (England) H. Mellersh (Scotland) A. McWilliam (England) Miss Urquhart

=== September ===
Ended	Tournament	Winner	Finalist	Semi finalist	Quarter finalist
3 Sep.	Southern California Championships (Fall Edition); Santa Monica Casino Courts; Santa Monica, United States; Asphalt; Singles - Doubles	(United States) Miss Schumacher; Won	(United States) Miss Dexter		
5 Sep	Singapore LTC Ladies Championship; Singapore LTC; Singapore, Straits Settlements; Grass; Singles - Doubles	(Straits Settlements) Miss Denny's; 6–1, 6–2	(Straits Settlements) Mrs. Bentley	(Straits Settlements) Mrs. Dare	
6 Sep	South of England Championships; Devonshire Park LTC; Eastbourne, England; Grass; Singles - Doubles	(United Kingdom) Margaret Bracewell; 6–1, 6–3	(England) Blanche Hillyard	(England) Florence Mardall (England) Laura Triscott	(England) E. Malcolm (England) E. Monckton (England) Mrs Kate Tullock (England) Alice Strapp
6 Sep	South of England Championships; Devonshire Park LTC; Eastbourne, England; Grass; Singles - Doubles	(England) Edith Gurney (England) Blanche Hillyard; 6–4, 6–3	(United Kingdom) Margaret Bracewell (England) Florence Mardall	(England) Florence Mardall (England) Laura Triscott	(England) E. Malcolm (England) E. Monckton (England) Mrs Kate Tullock (England) Alice Strapp
6 Sep	South of England Championships; Devonshire Park LTC; Eastbourne, England; Grass; Singles - Doubles	(United Kingdom) Margaret Bracewell (United Kingdom) Ernest Wool Lewis; 6–4, 8–6	(England) Elizabeth Mocatta/ (United Kingdom) Harry Stone	(England) Florence Mardall (England) Laura Triscott	(England) E. Malcolm (England) E. Monckton (England) Mrs Kate Tullock (England) Alice Strapp
20 Sep	New Hamburg Invitation; New Hamburg LTC; New Hamburg, United States; Grass; Singles - Doubles	(United States) May Colby; Won	(United States) Sadie Steele	(United States) Anna Kerr	
24 Sep	New York Tennis Club Open; New York TC; New York City, United States; Clay; Singles - Doubles	(United States) Miss Smallwood; 6–4, 1–6, 6–2	(United States) Miss Grundy	(United States) Miss Tisdale (United States) Miss Voorhoes	
27 Sep	Wissahickon Open; Philadelphia Cricket Club; Wissahickon, United States; Grass; Singles - Doubles	(United States) Nellie Hansel; Won	(United States) ?		
30 Sep.	U.S. National Championships; Philadelphia Country Club; Philadelphia, United States; Grass; Singles	(United States) Ellen Hansell; 6-1, 6-0	(United States) Laura Knight	(United States) Helen Day Harris (United States) Alice Janney	(United States) Louise Allerdice (United States) Ruth Cott (United States) Jessie Harding

=== October ===
Ended	Tournament	Winner	Finalist	Semi finalist	Quarter finalist
10 Oct	Ladies Club for Outdoor Sports Open; Livingston, United States; Singles - Doubles	(United States) Adeline Robinson; 6–0, 6–1	(United States) Mrs AH Harris	(United States) Mary Fellowes-Morgan	(United States) Miss Trowbridge (United States) Miss Voorhoes
10 Oct	Ladies Club for Outdoor Sports Open; Livingston, United States; Singles - Doubles	(United States) Adeline Robinson (United States) Kitty Smith; 6–2, 6–2	(United States) Mary Fellowes-Morgan (United States) Violet Ward	(United States) Mary Fellowes-Morgan	(United States) Miss Trowbridge (United States) Miss Voorhoes
15 Oct	Fall Open Far and Near; Far and Near LTC; Hastings-on-Hudson, United States; Grass; Singles - Doubles	(United States) Adeline Robinson; 6–0, 6–4	(United States) Ellen Roosevelt	(United States) May Colby (United States) Miss Smallwood	(United States) G. Fraser (United States) Miss Lent (United States) Miss Reese (United States) G. W. Roosevelt
17 Oct	Delaware Field Club Open; Delaware Field Club; Wilmington, United States; Clay; Singles - Doubles	(United States) Bertha Townsend; 6–4, 6–4	(United States) Ellen Hansell	(United States) Miss Bailey (United States) Florence Bayard	(United States) Miss Duffield (United States) Catherine Pyle
26 Oct	Victorian Championships; Melbourne Cricket Club; Melbourne, Australia; Singles - Doubles	(Australia) Mabel Shaw; 6–2, 6–3	(Australia) Eliza Fitzgerald	(Australia) Nellie A. Beckett (Australia) Miss Fincham	
26 Oct	Victorian Championships; Melbourne Cricket Club; Melbourne, Australia; Singles - Doubles	(Australia) Mabel Shaw (Australia) Phenie Shaw	(Australia) Nellie A'Beckett (Australia) Eliza Fitzgerald	(Australia) Nellie A. Beckett (Australia) Miss Fincham	

=== November ===
Ended	Tournament	Winner	Finalist	Semi finalist	Quarter finalist
30 Nov	Otago LTA Tournament; Carisbrook Club Ground; Dunedin, New Zealand; Grass; Singles - Doubles	(New Zealand) E. Bathgate; 8–6	(New Zealand) Miss Orbell	(New Zealand) Miss Hertslet (New Zealand) R. Orbell	(New Zealand) Kate Grant

=== December ===
Ended	Tournament	Winner	Finalist	Semi finalist	Quarter finalist
24 Dec	New Zealand Championships; Christchurch, New Zealand; Grass; Singles - Doubles	(New Zealand) Eveleen Harman; 6–4, 7–9, 6–1	(New Zealand) Ruth Orbell	(New Zealand) E Harman (New Zealand) Mrs G Way	(New Zealand) Miss Campbell (New Zealand) Mrs George (New Zealand) Miss Orbell (New Zealand) Miss Temple
24 Dec	New Zealand Championships; Christchurch, New Zealand; Grass; Singles - Doubles	(New Zealand) E Gordon (New Zealand) Eveleen Harman; 6–3, 6–1	(New Zealand) Miss Orbell (New Zealand) Ruth Orbell	(New Zealand) E Harman (New Zealand) Mrs G Way	(New Zealand) Miss Campbell (New Zealand) Mrs George (New Zealand) Miss Orbell (New Zealand) Miss Temple
24 Dec	New Zealand Championships; Christchurch, New Zealand; Grass; Singles - Doubles	(New Zealand) Hilda Hitchings (New Zealand) EP Hudson; 6–3, 6–1	(New Zealand) Sarah Lance (New Zealand) HB Williams	(New Zealand) E Harman (New Zealand) Mrs G Way	(New Zealand) Miss Campbell (New Zealand) Mrs George (New Zealand) Miss Orbell (New Zealand) Miss Temple

== Tournament winners (singles) ==
This is a list of winners by the total number of singles titles won for 1887 major titles in bold:

- (United Kingdom) Margaret Bracewell – Eastbourne, Edgbaston, Leicester, Scarborough, Whitby, (**5**)
- (England) Lottie Dod – Bath, **Irish Championships**, **Northern Championships**, **Wimbledon Championships** (**4**)
- (England) Beatrice Wood – Chapel Allerton, Ilkley, Headingley, Whitby II, (**4**)
- (England) Blanche Hillyard – Exmouth, London, Torquay, (**3**)
- (United States) Adeline Robinson – Hastings-on-Hudson, Livingston, (**2**)
- (Ireland) Connie Butler – Edinburgh, Newcastle upon Tyne, (**2**)
- (England) Brenda James – Leyton, Leyton II (**2**)
- (United States) Ellen Hansell – **U.S. National Championships**, (**1**)
- (Dominion of Ceylon) Isa Watson – Nuwara Eliya, (**1**)
- (New Zealand) Miss Mowbray – Auckland, (**1**)
- (Australia) EM Mayne – Sydney, (**1**)
- (Scotland) Julia MacKenzie – Pollokshields, (**1**)
- (England) Mabel Boulton – Whitehouse, (**1**)
- (Ireland) Louisa Martin – Cheltenham, (**1**)
- (Australia) Mabel Shaw – Melbourne, (**1**)
- (England) Maud Watson – Penarth, (**1**)
- (United States) Margie Pettet – White Sulphur Springs, (**1**)
- (England) Miss Pickthall – Waterloo, (**1**)
- (Ireland) Doireann Boyle – Armagh, (**1**)
- (Colony of Natal) Mabel Grant – Pietermaritzburg, (**1**)
- (Ireland) May Langrishe – Buxton, (**1**)
- (United States) Grace Gilliland – Riverside, (**1**)
- (United Kingdom) Evelyn Blencowe – Leamington Spa, (**1**)
- (United Kingdom) Nora Pope – Taunton, (**1**)
- (England) D Patterson – Chiswick, (**1**)
- (United States) Miss Smallwood – New York City, (**1**)
- (United States) Bertha Townsend – Wilmington, (**1**)
- (United Kingdom) Charlotte Cooper – Ealing, (**1**)
- (England) Effie Noon – Stafford, (**1**)
- (United States) May Colby – New Hamburg, (**1**)
- (New Zealand) Eveleen Harman – Christchurch, (**1**)
- (England) Helen Jackson – Darlington, (**1**)
- (United States) Miss Schumacher – Santa Monica, (**1**)
- (United Kingdom) Miss Cobbold – East Grinstead, (**1**)
- (United States) Nellie Hansel – Wissahickon, (**1**)
- (United Kingdom) Frances Snook – Nottingham, (**1**)
- (Straits Settlements) Miss Denny's – Singapore, (**1**)
- (United Kingdom) C. Smith – St Leonards-on-Sea, (**1**)
- (England) Ann Dod – Moffat, (**1**)
- (United Kingdom) Kate Barkley – Saxmundham, (**1**)
- (England) Miss Marley – Norton, (**1**)
- (England) Miss Smith – Howth, (**1**)
- (Ireland) P. Knox – Waterford, (**1**)
- (Ireland) Jennie Power – Kilkenny, (**1**)
- (United Kingdom) Constance Hodgson – Hull, (**1**)
- (New Zealand) E. Bathgate – Dunedin, (**1**)
- (England) Constance Bryan – Bournemouth, (**1**)

== Season statistics ==
=== Singles ===
- Total Tournaments (69)
- Most Titles: (England) Margaret Bracewell & (England) Lottie Dod (5)
- Most Finals: (England) Maud Watson (7)
