= 1885 women's tennis season =

1885 Women's tennis season
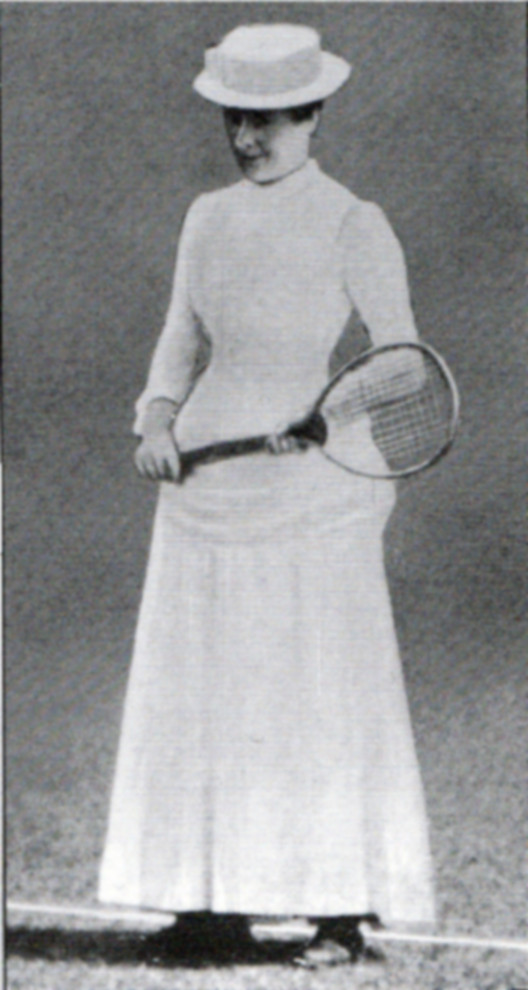
- Maud Watson is singles title leader this year

Details
- Duration: 4 May – 6 November
- Edition: 10th
- Tournaments: 60 (Amateur)
- Categories: Important (3); National (0); Provincial/Regional/State (7); County (7); Regular (13)

Achievements (singles)
- Most titles: (England) Maud Watson (5)
- Most finals: (England) Blanche Bingley (6)

The 1885 Women's tennis season was a tennis circuit composed of 60 national, regional, county, and regular tournaments. The season began in May in Sydney, Australia and ended in November in New Haven, United States.

== Season summary ==
Prior to the creation of the International Lawn Tennis Federation and the establishment of its world championship events in 1913 the Wimbledon Championships, the U.S. National Championships, the Irish Lawn Tennis Championships and the Northern Championships were considered by players and historians as the four most important tennis tournaments to win.

1885 sees a large expansion in the overall number of combined women's events being held as the tennis circuit continues to grow. At the beginning of may the first Inter-Colonial Lawn Tennis Tournament (later known as the New South Wales Championships) is held in Sydney, Australia and is won by Annie Lamb.

In late May 1884 at the first major event of the year the Irish Championships in Dublin, Ireland. In the women's singles final England's Maud Watson retains the title defeating Irleland's Louisa Martin. Watson also claims the doubles title with her sister Lilian Watson defeating the Irish sisters Adela Langrishe and May Langrishe. In the mixed doubles Watson retains the title with William Renshaw against Ireland's Connie Butler and Ireland's Ernest Browne. and completes a clean sweep of all possible events, singles, doubles and mixed doubles.

In June 1884 at the second major tournament of the year the Northern Championships in Manchester England's Maud Watson wins her second major singles title against Edith Davies. The women's doubles title is won by Ann Dod and Lottie Dod who defeated Margaret Bracewell and Beatrice Langrishe. In the mixed doubles event Maud Watson wins a second title paired with William Renshaw beating England's Margaret Bracewell and America's James Dwight.

At the 1885 Wimbledon Championships the world's first major tennis tournament in the singles competition Maud Watson defeats Blanche Bingley to claim a second ladies championship title. At the U.S. National Championships there was still no women's championship events held.

In Australasia in October the Victorian Championships held in Melbourne, Australia and played on asphalt courts is won by Mabel Shaw. In November the season ended in the United States at the New Hampshire Tennis Association Tournament at that was by Adeline Robinson. In 1913 the International Lawn Tennis Federation was created, and consisted of 13 national member associations. The ILTF through its associated members then became responsible for supervising women's tour events.

== Season results ==
Notes 1: Challenge Round: the final round of a tournament, in which the winner of a single-elimination phase faces the previous year's champion, who plays only that one match. The challenge round was used in the early history of tennis (from 1877 through 1921), in some tournaments not all.

* Indicates challenge round final

Key

Main events.
National events
Provincial/State/Regional events
County events
Regular events

=== Singles ===
Results included:.

Tournaments (31)
#	Date ended	Tournament	Location	Surface	Winner	Finalist	Score
1.	7-May-1885	Inter-Colonial Lawn Tennis Tournament	Sydney	Grass	(Australia) Annie Lamb	(Australia) Miss Gordon	6–5, 6–4, 6–1, 6–1
2.	26-May-1885	Irish Championships	Dublin	Grass	(England) Maud Watson	(Ireland) Louisa Martin	6–2, 4–6, 6–3
3.	30-May-1885	West of England Championships	Bath	Grass	(England) Gertrude Gibbs	(England) Edith Davies	2–6, 6–4, 6–0
4.	6-Jun-1885	East Gloucestershire Championships	Cheltenham	Grass	(England) Maud Watson	(Ireland) Connie Butler	6–3, 6–1
5.	13-Jun-1885	Kilkenny County and City Tournament	Archersfield	Grass	(Ireland) May Langrishe	(England) Miss Neville	6–1, 6–8
6.	13-Jun-1885	London Championships	Stamford Bridge	Grass	(England) Maud Watson	(England) Lilian Watson	6–2, 6–3
7.	17-Jun-1885	Acton Vale LTC Open	East Acton	Grass	(England) Blanche Bingley	(England) Miss Day	6–0, 6–2
8.	19-Jun-1885	Waterloo Tournament	Liverpool	Grass	(England) Lottie Dod	(England) Margaret Bracewell	6–4, 6–2
9.	20-Jun-1885	Brincliffe Lawn Tennis Club Open Tournament	Sheffield	Grass	(England) Beatrice Wood	(England) Florence Mardall	6–1, 6–0
10.	27-Jun-1885	Northern Championships *	Manchester	Grass	(England) Maud Watson	(England) Edith Davies	6–3, 6–3
11.	3-Jul-1885	Midland Counties Championship Cup	Edgbaston	Grass	(England) Margaret Bracewell	(England) Mary Steedman	6–3, 6–2
12.	9-Jul-1885	Ealing Lawn Tennis Tournament	Ealing	Grass	(England) Charlotte Cooper	(England) Edith Gurney	6–4, 6–4
13.	9-Jul-1885	Natal Championships	Durban	Grass	(Colony of Natal) Mabel Grant	(Colony of Natal) L. Button	18–8 games
14.	17-Jul-1885	Wimbledon Championships	London	Grass	(England) Maud Watson	(England) Blanche Bingley	6–1, 7–5
15.	25-Jul-1885	Chiswick Park Tournament	Chiswick Park	Grass	(England) Edith Gurney	(England) Blanche Bingley	1–6, 7–5, 6–0
16.	25-Jul-1885	Leicester Open Lawn Tennis Tournament	Leicester	Grass	(England) Margaret Bracewell	(England) Agnes Watts	6–2, 8–6
17.	6-Aug-1885	Darlington Association Tournament	Darlington	Grass	(Ireland) Florence Stanuell	(Ireland) Connie Butler	6–0, 7–5
18.	8-Aug-1885	West of Ireland Championships	Sligo	Grass	(Ireland) C. McClintock	(Ireland) Maude Scovell	0–6, 6–3, 6–2
19.	14-Aug-1885	East Grinstead Lawn Tennis Tournament	East Grinstead	Grass	(England) Blanche Bingley	(England) Edith Davies	6–2, 5–7, 6–3
20.	17-Aug-1885	Charleville Ladies' Tournament	Charleville	Grass	(Australia) Miss Crookbain		Won
21.	18-Aug-1885	Bournemouth Lawn Tennis Club Tournament	Bournemouth	Grass	(England) Mrs Surman	(England) Mrs Hornby	drew
22.	20-Aug-1885	Augusta Tournament	Augusta	Grass	(United States) Miss Haynes	(United States) Katie Baldwin	3–6, 6–1, 6–4
23.	22-Aug-1885	North Yorkshire Tournament	Scarborough	Grass	(United Kingdom) Mabel Boulton	(United Kingdom) Beatrice Wood	6–2, 6–2
24.	22-Aug-1885	South of Scotland Championships	Moffat	Grass	(England) Ann Dod	(Scotland) J. Forrest	6–0, 6–0
25.	29-Aug-1885	Derbyshire Championships	Buxton	Grass	(England) Blanche Bingley	(Ireland) Louisa Martin	6–3, 6–3
26.	17-Sep-1885	South of England Championships	Eastbourne	Grass	(England) Blanche Bingley	(England) Ada Strapp	6–1, 6–0
27.	26-Sep-1885	Sussex County Lawn Tennis Tournament	Brighton	Asphalt	(United Kingdom) EF Hudson	(England) Constance Bryan	6–1, 6–4
28.	26-Sep-1885	Orange LTC Open	Montrose	Grass	(United States) Adeline Robinson	(United States) Grace Roosevelt	6–3, 3–6, 6–2
29.	5-Oct-1885	Camp Washington Ladies Lawn Tennis Tournament	Livingston	Grass	(United States) Miss Lesley	(United States) Miss Austin	4–6, 6–2, 6–3
30.	10-Oct-1885	Victorian Championships	Melbourne	Asphalt	(Australia) Mabel Shaw	(Australia) Miss Patterson	13–7 games
31.	6-Nov-1885	New Hampshire Tennis Association Tournament	New Haven	Grass	(United States) Adeline Robinson	(United States) Emma Leavitt-Morgan	6–2, 6–3

== Tournament winners ==
=== Singles ===
This is list of winners sorted by number of singles titles (# and main titles in bold)

- (England) Maud Watson (**5**) Cheltenham, **Irish Championships**, **Northern Championships**, **Wimbledon Championships**, Stamford Bridge.
- (England) Blanche Bingley (**4**) Buxton, East Acton, Eastbourne, East Grinstead,
- (United States) Adeline Robinson (**2**) Montrose, New Haven
- (Ireland) May Langrishe (**1**) Archersfield
- (United States) Miss Haynes (**1**) Augusta
- (England) Gertrude Gibbs (**1**) Bath
- (England) Mrs Surman (**1**) Brighton
- (Australia) Miss Crookbain (**1**) Charleville
- (England) Edith Gurney (**1**) Chiswick Park
- (Ireland) Florence Stanuell (**1**) Darlington
- (Colony of Natal) Mabel Grant (**1**) Durban
- (England) Charlotte Cooper (**1**) Ealing
- (England) Lottie Dod (**1**) Liverpool
- (United States) Miss Lesley (**1**) Livingston
- (Australia) Mabel Shaw (**1**) Melbourne
- (England) Ann Dod (**1**) Moffat
- (United Kingdom) Mabel Boulton (**1**) Scarborough
- (England) Beatrice Wood (**1**) Sheffield
- (Ireland) C. McClintock (**1**) Sligo
- (Australia) Annie Lamb (**1**) Sydney

=== Doubles ===
This is list of winners sorted by number of doubles titles (# and main titles in bold)
Note: Ann Dod and Connie Butler won titles with two different partners.

- (England) Ann Dod & (England) Lottie Dod/ (Scotland) Miss Cornelius (**3**) **Northern Championships**, Liverpool, Moffat
- (Ireland) Connie Butler & (Ireland) Louisa Martin/ (England) Miss Marley (**3**) Cheltenham, Darlington, Newcastle
- (England) Lilian Watson & (England) Maud Watson (**2**) **Irish Championships**, Stamford Bridge.
- (England) Lottie Dod & (England) Ann Dod (**2**) **Northern Championships**, Liverpool.
- (England) Miss Marley & (Ireland) Connie Butler (**2**) Darlington, Newcastle
- (England) Blanche Bingley & (Ireland) Beatrice Langrishe/ (England) Edith Gurney (**2**) Brighton, East Grinstead
- (Ireland) May Langrishe & (Ireland) Miss Neville (**1**) Archersfield.
- (England) Gertrude Gibbs & (England) Edith Davies (**1**) Bath.
- (England) Edith Gurney & (England) Blanche Bingley (**1**) Brighton.
- (United Kingdom) Margaret Bracewell & (England) Agnes Watts (**1**) Buxton.
- (Ireland) Louisa Martin & (Ireland) Connie Butler (**1**) Cheltenham.
- (Ireland) Beatrice Langrishe & (England) Blanche Bingley (**1**) East Grinstead.
- (United Kingdom) Bertha Steedman & (United Kingdom) Mary Steedman (**1**) Edgbaston.
- (United States) Miss Lesley & (United States) Miss Miller (**1**) Livingston
- (Scotland) Miss Cornelius & Ann Dod (**1**) Moffat.
- (Australia) Miss Lydiard & (Australia) Miss Wilson (**1**) Melbourne

=== Mixed doubles ===
This is list of winners sorted by number of mixed doubles titles (# and main titles in bold)

- (United Kingdom) Margaret Bracewell & (England) William Renshaw/ (England) Walter Chamberlain (**5**) Buxton, Cheltenham, Edgbaston, Leicester, Scarborough.
- (England) Maud Watson & (England) /Erskine Watson (England) Harry Grove/ (England) William Renshaw (**4**) **Irish Championships**, **Northern Championships**, Stamford Bridge, Teignmouth.
- (Ireland) Connie Butler & (United Kingdom) C Liddel/ (Scotland) Patrick Bowes-Lyon (**3**) Darlington, Gosforth, Newcastle-upon-Tyne
- (England) Blanche Bingley & (England) Harry Grove (**2**) Chiswick Park, East Grinstead.
- (England) Miss Binney & (England) A.D. Hensley (**1**) Abingdon.
- (Ireland) Mabel Cahill & (Ireland) Francis R. Swayne (**1**) Archersfield.
- (Ireland) Miss Cuppage & (Ireland) George Archibald Tisdall (**1**) Athboy
- (United Kingdom) Miss Carpenter & (United Kingdom) Donald Stewart (**1**) Bath.
- (England) Miss Hodsdon & (England) Frank Noon/Lady Evershed & Sir Sydney Evershed (**1**) Burton-upon-Trent (title shared).
- (England) Miss T.H. Lewis & (England) T. Lewis (**1**) Charmouth.
- (England) Constance Bryan & (England) Charles Ross (**1**) Brighton.
- (United Kingdom) Mrs Ravenhill & (United Kingdom) Captain H.T. Ravenhill (**1**) Denbigh.
- (England) Edith Gurney & (England) William C. Taylor (**1**) Eastbourne.
- (England) Katherine J. Hole & (United Kingdom) Captain M.R. Bethune (**1**) Eggesford.
- (New Zealand) Rose Tanner & (New Zealand) J. W. Begg (**1**) Farndon Park.
- (England) Miss Goddard & (England) A.E. Wood (**1**) Fylde.
- (Scotland) Miss Stewart & (Scotland) Richard Millar Watson (**1**) Harwick.
- (United Kingdom) Miss Palmer & (United Kingdom) R.H. Pickering (**1**) Langley Marish.
- (United Kingdom) Mrs Clarke & (United Kingdom) John Charles Kay (**1**) Leamington.
- (Switzerland) Miss Salaman & (United Kingdom) D. Fitzgerald (**1**) Les Diablerets.
- (England) Lottie Dod & (United Kingdom) John Edmondson (**1**) Liverpool.
- (United States) Kitty Smith & (United States) Robert Livingston Beeckman (**1**) Livingston.
- (Scotland) Miss L. Murray & (Scotland) William Ferguson (**1**) Moffat.
- (England) Miss Cornish-Bowden & (England) T.P. Whateley (**1**) Newton Abbot.
- (England) Miss Henstock & (England) T.M. Draper (**1**) Pensarn.
- (Ireland) Miss Henry & (Ireland) A.D. Johns (**1**) Portrush.
- (France) Miss Soltau-Symons & (England) Saint John Halford Coventry (**1**) Plymouth.
- (Scotland) Miss Campbell & (Scotland) Anderson Steele (**1**) Rothesay.
- (Ireland) C. McClintock & (Ireland) Willoughby Hamilton (**1**) Sligo.
- (Scotland) Lottie Paterson & (Scotland) John Galbraith Horn (**1**) St. Andrews.
- (England) Miss Smee & (England) James Herbert Crispe (**1**) Stoke Newington.
- (Australia) Annie Lamb & (Australia) Charles Cropper (**1**) Sydney.
- (England) Miss Marriott & (England) William Bolding Monement (**1**) Tasburgh.
- (England) Miss Henry & James Baldwin (**1**) Tenby.
- (England) Miss Wood & (England) Arthur Godfrey Pease (**1**) Whitby.
- (England) Miss Brook & (England) Richard Montague Ainslie (**1**) Windamere.

== Statistical summary ==
=== Singles ===
- Total Tournaments (32)
- Most Titles: (England) Maud Watson (5)
- Most Finals: (England) Blanche Bingley (6)
- Most Matches Played: (England) Maud Watson (19)
- Most Matches Won: (England) Maud Watson (19)
- Match Winning %: (England) Maud Watson (100%)
- Most Tournaments Played: (England) Blanche Bingley (8)

=== Doubles ===
- Total Tournaments: (15)
- Most Titles: (England) Ann Dod & (Ireland) Connie Butler (3)
- Most Finals: (Ireland) Connie Butler (5)

=== Mix Doubles ===
- Total Tournaments: (45)
- Most Titles: (United Kingdom) Margaret Bracewell (5)
- Most Finals: (United Kingdom) Margaret Bracewell (7)
