= Ilkley Open =

Defunct tennis tournament
- Event name: Ilkley Tournament (1885); Ilkley Open Tournament (1886–89); Ilkley Open Lawn Tennis Tournament (1890–68); Ilkley LTC Open Tournament (1969–70); Green Shield Ilkley Tournament (1971–74); Ilkley LTC Open Tournament (1975–79); Ilkley Open (1980–81)
- Founded: 1885; 140 years ago
- Abolished: 1981; 44 years ago
- Location: Ilkley, West Yorkshire, England
- Venue: Ilkley Lawn Tennis & Squash Club
- Surface: Grass

The Ilkley Open was a grass court tennis event founded in May 1885 as the Ilkley Tournament. It was held at the Ilkley Lawn Tennis Club (f.1880), Ilkley, West Yorkshire, England through until 1981, when it failed to find any new sponsors the tournament ended.

== History ==
The Ilkley Open was first established in May 1885. The winner of first men's singles event was Edward Fletcher who defeated A.R. Atkinson. In 1886 the first women's singles event was won by Beatrice Wood who defeated Lila Moir. (for this year only it was also valid as the East Yorkshire Championships). Ilkley Lawn Tennis Club also played host for Yorkshire Lawn Tennis Association tournament called the Yorkshire Championships four times (1888–90, 1893). From 1890 to 1968 the event went under the name of the Ilkley Open Lawn Tennis Tournament.

In 1981 after a period of 95 years the final Ilkley Open was concluded. The final men's singles event was won by Geoffrey Paish who defeated Simon Ickringill, who is now the head coach at the Ilkley club. In 1983 final women's singles title was won by Cathy Berry who defeated Michelle Collins.

Former winners of the men's singles included; Joshua Pim, William Drumond Hamilton, Major Ritchie, Andras Kalman, Mohammed Arif Ilahi, Hank Irvine and Geoffrey Paish. Former winners of the women's singles title included; Helen Jackson, Gem Hoahing, Shirley Bloomer, Rita Bentley, Robin Blakelock and Liz Starkie.

Following the end of this tournament international tennis events have continued to be staged at the Ilkley club. From 1996 to 1998 the ITF Ilkley tournament was part of the ITF Women's Circuit, and again between 2006 and 2007. Since 2010 the Ilkley Trophy an ITF W100 category tournament is still being played today.

== Event names ==
- Ilkley Tournament (1885)
- Ilkley Open Tournament (1886–89)
- Ilkley Open Lawn Tennis Tournament (1890–68)
- Ilkley LTC Open Tournament (1969–70)
- Green Shield Ilkley Tournament (1971–74)
- Ilkley LTC Open Tournament (1975–79)
- Ilkley Open (1980–81)
- ITF Ilkley (1996–98, 2006–07)
- Ilkley Trophy (2015-2024)
- Lexus Ikley Open (2025-current)
