= Beatrice Draffen =

English tennis player

- Full name: Beatrice Mary Ann Draffen
- Country (sports): GBR
- Born: 1865 Ackworth, West Riding of Yorkshire, England
- Died: 13 July 1962 (aged 96–97) England
- Turned pro: 1884 (amateur tour)
- Retired: 1907

Singles
- Career titles: 10

Grand Slam singles results
- Wimbledon: SF (1895, 1896)

Doubles
- Career titles: 1
- Career titles: 1

Beatrice Mary Ann Draffen (1865 – 13 July 1962) (née Beatrice Wood) was a British tennis player from Ackworth, West Riding of Yorkshire, England active from 1884 to 1897. She was a two time semi finalist in the women's singles at the 1895 Wimbledon Championships and 1896 Wimbledon Championships. She won 10 career singles titles.

== Career ==
Beatrice was born in 1865 in Ackworth, West Riding of Yorkshire, England. She played her first tournament at the Northern Championships held at the Liverpool Cricket Club grounds in June 1884 in Liverpool where she lost to Ann Dod in the first round. In major tournament singles events she played at the 1892 Wimbledon Championships under the name of Mrs G.A. Draffen and reached the quarter-finals before losing to Blanche Hillyard.

At the 1894 Wimbledon Championships she reached the quarter-finals stage of the competition before she was beaten in straight sets by Constance Bryan. At the 1895 Wimbledon Championships she progressed to the semi-finals, but lost to Charlotte Cooper. She played the Championships one more time in 1896, and again reached the semi-finals losing in three sets to Alice Pickering.

Her other career singles highlights include winning the Ilkley Open Tournament three times (1886, 1888, 1890), and the Sheffield and Hallamshire Tournament twice (1890–1891). North of England Championships two times in (1892, 1894). She also won the Badsworth Hunt Tournament at Pontefract (1886), the Yorkshire Open Championships in (1894) and the Tyndale Open Tournament in (1896).

She was also finalist at the prestigious Northern Championships three times (1890, 1891, 1894), the North Yorkshire Tournament two times in (1884, 1885), the Yorkshire Lawn Tennis Tournament two times (1884, 1885), the Ilkley Open (1889), the Cheltenham Championships (1890), the Derbyshire Championships (1891), the Hull Westbourne Avenue Open Tournament in (1892) and North of England Championships (1896).

In doubles play she won titles at the Ilkley Open (1886) partnering Miss Tannett. In mixed doubles she won Chapel Allerton LTC Tournament (1886) with Arthur H Meysey-Thompson. She retired from playing singles tennis in 1897, she did occasionally take part in doubles and mixed doubles up to the early 1900s.

== Personal life ==
She was born in 1865 as Beatrice Mary Ann Wood the daughter of Dr. John Wood of Ackworth, West Riding of Yorkshire. She married Captain George Algernon Draffen on 26 April 1892 at Ackworth, West Riding he was the youngest son of Colonel W. Pitt Draffen, and later had two children .
