= Hawke's Bay Championships =

Napier Open Hawke's Bay Open Hawke's Bay Championships

Defunct tennis tournament
- Tour: ILTF Circuit
- Founded: 1886; 139 years ago
- Abolished: 1972; 53 years ago
- Location: Dannevirke; Hastings; Havelock North; Napier; Waipawa
- Venue: Various
- Surface: Grass

The Hawke's Bay Championships was a men's and women's grass court tennis tournament founded in 1886 as men's event called the Napier Open. The tournament ran annually through til 1972 until it was discontinued.

== History ==
In late December 1885 the Napier Lawn Tennis Club organised the first Napier Open men's tournament, which was played at Farndon Park. There was also a mixed doubles event staged from 1887 under the tournament name Farndon Park Open. The tournament ran annually under that name, when the competition was expanded to include the Hawke's Bay area thus becoming a regional event called the Hawke's Bay Open in 1900 and organised by the Hawke's Bay Tennis Association. In 1908 the event was re-branded as the Hawke's Bay Championships. The championships were staged annually with the exception of World War One until 1972 when they were discontinued.

== Locations ==
The tournament was held in various locations such as Dannevirke, Hastings, Havelock North, Napier and Waipawa in Hawke's Bay, New Zealand.

== Finals ==
=== Men's singles ===
(Incomplete roll)

Napier Open
Year	Location	Champions	Runners-up	Score
1886	Napier	(England) Eric Pollard Hudson	(New Zealand) Minden Fenwick	6–1, 6–2, 6–3.
1887	Napier	(New Zealand) Percival Clennell Fenwick	(New Zealand) Eric Pollard Hudson	6–2, 6–0, 6–4.
1888	Napier	(New Zealand) Percival Clennell Fenwick	(New Zealand) Minden Fenwick	6–4, 6–3, 6–1.
1890	Napier	(New Zealand) Richard Dacre Harman	(New Zealand) Robert Osmond Koch	4–6, 8–6, 6–0, 6–2.
Hawke's Bay Championship
1902	Hastings	(United Kingdom) E.L. Salmond	(New Zealand) Charles Harrington Broad	3–6, 6–3, 6–3.
1915/1919	Not held (due to World War I)			
1906	Napier	(New Zealand) Robert Sloan Brown	(New Zealand) Charles Harrington Broad	3–6, 6–3, 6–3.
1908	Dannevirke	(New Zealand) Harry Alabaster Parker	(New Zealand) G. Ebbett	6–1, 6–0.
1911	Havelock North	(New Zealand) Geoffrey Morton Ollivier	(New Zealand) Herbert Linley Robson	6–0, 4–6, 6–2, 6–3.
1921	Hastings	(New Zealand) K.G. Walker	(New Zealand) Charles E. L. Margoliouth	6–3, 6–2.
1922	Napier	(New Zealand) Stanley Powdrell	(New Zealand) A.W. Campbell	6–2, 6–5.
1936	Dannevirke	(New Zealand) Jack Curtis Charters	(New Zealand) John W. (Jack) Gunn	6–1, 6–0.
1939	Hastings	(New Zealand) Norman N. Smith	(New Zealand) Buster Andrews	6–0, 4–6, 6–2, 6–3.
↓ Open era ↓
1971	Hastings	(New Zealand) Barry Smith	(New Zealand) Paul Finlayson	8–6, 6–4.
1972	Hastings	(New Zealand) Ian Beverley	(New Zealand) Andy Moffat	6–0, 6–4.

=== Women's singles ===
(Incomplete roll)

Hawke's Bay Open
Year	Location	Champions	Runners-up	Score
1904	Hastings	(New Zealand) Hilda Brathwaite	(New Zealand) Ruby Wellwood	6–1, 6–4.
Hawke's Bay Championship
1909	Napier	(New Zealand) Eva Baird	(New Zealand) Dorothy Hindmarsh	8–6, 8–6
1910	Dannevirke	(New Zealand) Ruby Wellwood	(New Zealand) Nancy Hartgill	9–6
1911	Havelock North	(New Zealand) Ruby Wellwood	(New Zealand) Eva Baird	6–0, 4–6, 6–2
1912	Napier	(New Zealand) Eva Baird	(New Zealand) Sybil Clark	9–1
1913	Dannevirke	(New Zealand) Nancy Hartgill	(New Zealand) Vera Simpson	6–1, 6–2
1914	Hastings	(New Zealand) Eileen Wellwood Maddison	(New Zealand) Doris Wellwood	6–5, 6–4
1915/1919	Not held (due to World War I)			
1920	Dannevirke?	(New Zealand) Doris Wellwood	(New Zealand) Mrs Cato	6–4, 6–4
1921	Hastings	(New Zealand) Zeta Wellwood	(New Zealand) Doris Fenwick	6–1, 2–6, 6–4
1922	Napier	(New Zealand) Zeta Wellwood	(New Zealand) Miss Kennedy	6–1, 2–6, 6–1
1923	Hastings	(New Zealand) Marjorie MacFarlane	(New Zealand) Beryl Knight	6–3, 5–7, 13–11
1924	Waipawa	(New Zealand) Nancy Hartgill Green	(United Kingdom) Vera Howett	6–1, 2–6, 6–1
1925	Napier	(United Kingdom) Vera Howett	(New Zealand) Marjorie MacFarlane	6–3, 6–1
1926	Dannevirke	(New Zealand) Nancy Hartgill Green	(New Zealand) Molly Cato	7–5, 6–2
1927	Napier	(New Zealand) Snow Clark	(New Zealand) Marion Lowry	3–8, 6–3, 6–2
1928	Waipawa	(New Zealand) Arita Howe Adams	(New Zealand) May Myers	6–5, 6–4
1930	Dannevirke	(New Zealand) Arita Howe Adams	(New Zealand) Margery Gibson	6–2, 7–9, 6–3
1936	Dannevirke	(New Zealand) Mrs. R. Swann	(New Zealand) Mrs. Mawson	6–3, 6–2.
1939	Hastings	(New Zealand) Marjorie MacFarlane	(New Zealand)	6–0, 4–6, 6–2, 6–3.
↓ Open era ↓
1971	Hastings	(United States) Kathy Harter	(New Zealand) Sue Blakely	6–1, 6–2
