= Margaret Moore (tennis) =

English tennis player

- Full name: Emily Margaret Moore
- Country (sports): United Kingdom
- Born: 13 May 1861; Gargrave, West Riding of Yorkshire, England
- Died: 14 May 1940 (age 79); Bognor Regis, Sussex, England
- Turned pro: 1884 (amateur tour)
- Retired: 1889

Singles
- Career titles: 13

Mixed doubles
- Career titles: 5

Emily Margaret Moore (née Bracewell 13 May 1861 – 14 May 1940) known as Margaret Bracewell during her playing days was an English tennis player active in the late 19th century. She was considered one of the best contemporary English lawn tennis players of the mid to late 1880s. She was a two time finalist at the prestigious Northern Championships in 1885 and 1887. She was active from 1884 to 1889 and contested 17 career singles finals, and won 13 titles.

== Career ==
Emily Margaret Bracewell was born 13 May 1861 in Gargrave, West Riding of Yorkshire, England, the daughter of Edmund Bracewell, a cotton manufacturer and his wife Jane. (The Bracewell sisters took part in several of the Yorkshire tournaments during their lawn tennis careers.)

Bracewell was considered one of the best contemporary English lawn tennis players of the mid to late 1880s, and one of a handful of players along with Grace Gibb to challenge the dominance of Maud Watson. She died on 14 May 1940 in Bognor Regis, Sussex, England.

== Family ==
The Bracewell family had several children, including two tennis playing daughters, Emily Margaret Bracewell and Gertrude Mary Bracewell, both of the girls were the daughters of Edmund Bracewell, a cotton manufacturer, and his wife Jane, and were born six years apart Margaret in 1861 and Gertrude in 1867, in Gargrave in Yorkshire. Margaret married George Moore in 1890 in Newton Abbot, Devon, England.

== Career finals ==
=== Singles:17 (13) titles, (4) runners-up ===
(*) Denotes All-Comers final (w.o.) denotes walkover. Key

Important.
National
Provincial/State/Regional (8)
County (3)
Regular (2)

Titles by Surface
Clay – Outdoor (0)
Grass – Outdoor (13)
Hard – Outdoor (0)
Unknown – Outdoor (0)
Carpet – Indoor (0)
Wood – Indoor (0)

Result	No.	Date	Tournament	Location	Surface	Opponent	Score
Win	1.	1884	Waterloo Tournament	Liverpool	Grass	(United Kingdom) R.C. Ball	6–4, 4–6, 6–4, 6–1
Loss	1.	1885	Northern Championships	Manchester	Grass	(United Kingdom) Edith Davies	6–2, 4–6, 0–6
Win	2.	1885	Leicester Open Lawn Tennis Tournament	Leicester	Grass	(United Kingdom) Agnes Noon Watts	6–2, 8–6
Win	3.	1885	Midland Counties Championship Cup	Edgbaston	Grass	(United Kingdom) Mary Steedman	6–3, 6–2
Loss	2.	1885	Waterloo Tournament	Liverpool	Grass	(England) Lottie Dod	4–6, 2–6
Win	4.	1886	North of England Championships	Scarborough	Grass	(United Kingdom) Mabel Boulton	6–0, 6–4
Win	5.	1886	North of England Championships	Scarborough	Grass	(United Kingdom) Mabel Boulton	6–4, 8–6
Win	6.	1886	Yorkshire Lawn Tennis Tournament	Harrogate	Grass	(United Kingdom) Mabel Boulton	5–7, 8–6, 3–0 retd.
Win	7.	1886	South of England Championships	Eastbourne	Grass	(England) Blanche Bingley	6–1, 6–3
Loss	2.	1887	Northern Championships*	Manchester	Grass	(England) Maud Watson	2–6, 2–6
Win	8.	1887	Leicestershire Championships	Leicester	Grass	(United Kingdom) Effie Noon	6–4, 6–2
Win	9.	1887	North of England Championships	Scarborough	Grass	(England) Ann Dod	6–0, 6–1
Win	10.	1887	South of England Championships	Eastbourne	Grass	(England) Blanche Bingley	6–4, 6–2
Win	11.	1887	Yorkshire Association and County Open Tournament	Whitby	Grass	(United Kingdom) M. Pole	6–4, 8–6
Win	12.	1887	Midland Counties Championships	Edgbaston	Grass	(England) Florence Mardall	6–0, 4–6, 7–5
Loss	3.	1888	South of England Championships	Eastbourne	Grass	(England) Blanche Hillyard	1–6, 1–6
Win	13.	1888	Midland Counties Championships	Edgbaston	Grass	(England) Florence Mardall	6–0, 4–6, 7–5

=== Doubles:2 (0) titles, (2) runners-up ===
Result	No.	Date	Tournament	Location	Surface	Partner	Opponents	Score
Loss	1.	1885	Waterloo Tournament	Liverpool	Grass	(England) Edith Davies	(England) Ann Dodd (England) Lottie Dod	4–6, 1–6, 5–7
Loss	2.	1885	Northern Championships	Manchester	Grass	(Ireland) Beatrice Langrishe	(England) Ann Dodd (England) Lottie Dod	3–6, 4–6

=== Mixed doubles:6 (5) titles, (1) runners-up ===
Result	No.	Date	Tournament	Location	Surface	Partner	Opponents	Score
Win	1.	1885	East Gloucestershire Championships	Cheltenham	Grass	(England) William Renshaw	(Ireland) Beatrice Langrishe (England) Charles Lacy Sweet	11–9, 6–2, 6–3
Loss	1.	1885	Northern Championships	Manchester	Grass	(United States) James Dwight	(England) Maud Watson (England) William Renshaw	2–6, 3–6
Win	2.	1886	West of England Championships	Bath	Grass	(England) William Renshaw	(England) Blanche Bingley (United States) James Dwight	5–7, 7–5, 6–4
Win	3.	1886	East Gloucestershire Championships	Cheltenham	Grass	(England) William Renshaw	(England) Blanche Bingley (United States) James Dwight	6–4, 6–4
Win	4.	1886	Northern Championships	Manchester	Grass	(England) William Renshaw	(England) Lottie Dod (England) Harry Grove	3–6, 6–2, 6–3
Win	5.	1888	Irish Championships	Manchester	Grass	(United Kingdom) Ernest Wool Lewis	(United Kingdom) Bertha Steedman (United Kingdom) Hugh Cairns	6–3, 6–3, 4–6, 9–7
