= Yorkshire Lawn Tennis Championships =

Yorkshire Championships

Defunct tennis tournament
- Tour: NLTA (1884-1910)
- Founded: 1884; 141 years ago
- Abolished: 1970; 55 years ago
- Location: Harrogate; Hull; Ilkley; Leeds; Scarborough; Sheffield; Whitby
- Surface: Grass

The Yorkshire Lawn Tennis Championships or simply known as the Yorkshire Championships was a combined men's and women's open grass court tennis tournament established in 1884 as the Yorkshire Lawn Tennis Tournament then later Yorkshire Association and County Open Tournament and ran till 1970. It was first held in Ilkley, then, Harrogate, then Whitby before moving permanently to Scarborough, North Yorkshire, England.

== History ==
The first Yorkshire Lawn Tennis Tournament was established in 1885 and played at Ilkley, Yorkshire, England. In 1887 the event was renamed as Yorkshire Association and County Open Tournament. In 1889 the name was changed again the Yorkshire Open Championships. In 1906 the event was moved permanently to Scarborough, North Yorkshire. The championships were held as part of the worldwide tennis circuit until 1970. The event is still being held as late as 2017 as the Yorkshire Tennis County Championships.

For the years 1892, 1894–1900 and 1904–1905 the tournament was also valid as the North of England Championships.

== Locations ==
The championships have been staged in the following towns and cities Harrogate, Hull, Ilkley, Leeds, Scarborough, Sheffield and Whitby

== Finals ==
=== Men's singles ===
(Incomplete roll)

| Year | Champion | Runner-up | Score |
|---|---|---|---|
Yorkshire Lawn Tennis Tournament
| 1884 | (Ireland) Ernest Browne | (England) Marmaduke Constable | 6-1, ret. |
| 1885 | (United Kingdom) Gilbert Mahon | (England) E.W. Fletcher | 6-0, 6–2, 6-4 |
| 1886 | (Ireland) Ernest Browne | (United Kingdom) Gilbert Mahon | 3-6, 4-6, 6-4, 6-4, 6-4 |
Yorkshire Association and County Open Tournament
| 1887 | (England) E.W. Fletcher | (England) Arthur Godfrey Pease | 6-2, 6-2, 7-5 |
| 1888 | (England) Arthur Godfrey Pease | (England) E.W. Fletcher | 5-7, 6-1, 6-4, 6-4 |
Yorkshire Open Championships
| 1889 | (United Kingdom) David Davy | (England) Arthur Godfrey Pease | w.o. |
| 1890 | (Ireland) Joshua Pim | (Ireland) Grainger Chaytor | 6-2, 6-0 ret. |
| 1891 | (Ireland) Joshua Pim (2) | (United Kingdom) James Baldwin | 6-3, 6-2, 2-6, 7-5 |
| 1892 | (Ireland) Joshua Pim (3) | (United Kingdom) David Davy | 6-1, 6-4, 3-1, ret. |
| 1893 | (Ireland) Joshua Pim (4) | (Ireland) George Ball-Greene | 6-4, 9-7, 6-4 |
| 1894 | (United Kingdom) Roy Allen | (Ireland) Joshua Pim | w.o. |
| 1895 | (Ireland) Grainger Chaytor | (United Kingdom) Harold Nisbet | 7-9, 4-6, 6-4, 9-7, 6-1 |
| 1898 | (Ireland) Grainger Chaytor (2) | (United Kingdom) Ernest Douglas Black | 6-2, 6-2, 4-6, 6-3 |
Yorkshire Championships
| 1900 | (Ireland) Grainger Chaytor (3) | (United Kingdom) Charles William Wade | 6-2, 6-2, 6-3 |
| 1901 | (United Kingdom) Laurie Doherty | (United Kingdom) Ernest Douglas Black | 6-2, 6-1, 6-1 |
| 1905 | (United Kingdom) Roy Allen (2) | (United Kingdom) Charles Gladstone Allen | w.o. |
| 1907 | (United Kingdom) Edgar Middleton | (United Kingdom) Ernest Watson | 6-3, 3-6, 6-8, 6-0, 6-4 |
| 1908 | (United Kingdom) Ernest Watson | (United Kingdom) John Francis Moss | 6-2, 6-3, 6-2 |
| 1909 | (United Kingdom) Sidney Watson | (United Kingdom) Edgar Middleton | 6-4, 6-3, 6-1 |
| 1910 | (United Kingdom) Sidney Watson (2) | (United Kingdom) Edgar Middleton | 0-6, 6-4, 6-3, 4-6, 6-1 |

=== Women's singles ===
(Incomplete roll)

| Year | Champion | Runner-up | Score |
|---|---|---|---|
Yorkshire Lawn Tennis Tournament
| 1884 | (United Kingdom) Constance Hodgson | (England) Beatrice Wood | 7-5, 6-3 |
| 1885 | (England) Mabel Boulton | (England) Beatrice Wood | 6-2, 6-2 |
| 1886 | (United Kingdom) Margaret Bracewell | (England) Mabel Boulton | 5-7, 8-6, 3-0 retd. |
Yorkshire Association and County Open Tournament
| 1887 | (United Kingdom) Margaret Bracewell (2) | (United Kingdom) Ethel Atkinson | 4-6, 6-2, 6-0 |
Yorkshire Association County Closed Tournament
| 1887 | (England) Beatrice Wood | (England) Mabel Boulton | 7-5, 5-7, 6-0 |
Yorkshire Association and County Open Tournament
| 1888 | (England) Mabel Boulton (2) | (United Kingdom) Margaret Bracewell | 6-4,8-6, 6-3 |
| 1889 | (England) Mabel Boulton (3) | (United Kingdom) Miss Crossley | 2–6, 6–2, 7–5 |
| 1890 | (England) Beatrice Wood (2) | (England) Jane Corder | 6–2, 6–1 |
Yorkshire Open Championships
| 1892 | (United Kingdom) Helen Jackson | (United Kingdom) Beatrice Wood Draffen | 6-0, ?, |
| 1894 | (United Kingdom) Beatrice Wood Draffen (3) | (United Kingdom) Katherine Grey | 6-3, 6-1 |
| 1895 | (United Kingdom) Lucy Kendal | (United Kingdom) Marion Crosby Morton | 6-2, 6-1 |
| 1896 | (United Kingdom) Lucy Kendal (2) | (United Kingdom) Beatrice Wood Draffen | ? |
| 1897 | (United Kingdom) Lucy Kendal (3) | (United Kingdom) Muriel Robb | 6-3, 6-0 |
| 1898 | (United Kingdom) Katherine Grey | (United Kingdom) Alice Simpson Pickering | 6-4, 6-4 |
| 1899 | (United Kingdom) Alice Simpson Pickering | (United Kingdom) Bertha Holder | 6-1, 6-4 |
Yorkshire Championships
| 1900 | (United Kingdom) Alice Simpson Pickering (2) | (United Kingdom) Ethel Jessop | 6-0, 6-2 |
| 1904 | (United Kingdom) Lucy Kendal (4) | (United Kingdom) Gladys Eastlake-Smith | 6-0, 4-6, 6-4 |
| 1905 | (United Kingdom) Bertha Holder | (United Kingdom) N. Morton | 11-9, 6-1 |
