= North of England Championships =

Defunct tennis tournament
- Tour: ILTF
- Founded: 1884
- Abolished: 1974
- Location: Various
- Venue: South Cliff LTC (1884-1909), Yorkshire LTC (1910-1966), Hoylake LTC (1969-1974)
- Surface: Grass

The North of England Championships and later known as the Rothmans Open North of England Championships (for sponsorship reasons), was a men's and women's grass court tennis tournament founded in 1884 as the North Yorkshire Tournament. It was mainly held at Scarborough, North Yorkshire, Great Britain from (1884–91, 1893–1903, 1905–1966, 1968). The tournament was discontinued in 1974 when it was staged at Hoylake.

== History ==
The North Yorkshire Tournament was first staged in 1884 at the South Cliff Lawn Tennis Club at Scarborough, North Yorkshire. In 1886 its name was changed to the North of England Championships. It was for a long period a popular summer tournament in the British lawn tennis calendar. In 1910 it changed venue to be played at the Yorkshire Lawn Tennis Club through until 1966. The only other places to host the North of England Championships was at Kingston-upon-Hull in 1892, then Harrogate in 1904. In 1967 the event temporarily moved to Hoylake in what was then Cheshire, before returning to Scarborough the following year. In 1969 the championships moved permanently back to Hoylake until 1974 when it was abolished

Notable winners of the men's singles included Ernest Browne (1886), Harry Sibthorpe Barlow, Laurie Doherty (1910), George Lyttleton Rogers (1937), Jaroslav Drobny (1949), Ashley Cooper (1958) and John Newcombe (1970). Previous women's singles champions included Alice Simpson Pickering (1899), Dorothea Douglass(1901), Elizabeth Ryan (1919), Joan Hartigan (1934), Ann Haydon (1956), Virginia Wade (1967), Margaret Smith Court (1968), Billie Jean Moffitt King (1971) and Evonne Goolagong (1972).

For the years 1892, 1894–1900 and 1904–1905 the tournament was also valid as the Yorkshire Championships. For the years 1960 and from 1967 the tournament was also valid as the Hoylake Open Championships.

== Sponsorship ==
In 1968 at the start of the open era the championships were sponsored by the newspaper the Liverpool Post and branded as the Liverpool Post North of England Championships. In 1969 the tobacco manufacturer Rothmans took over sponsorship of the event was then called the Rothmans Open North of England Championships until 1974.

== Locations ==
The championships were mainly held at Scarborough, North Yorkshire, Great Britain from (1884–91, 1893–1903, 1905–1966, 1968), but was also hosted at other locations including Ilkley (1885), Kingston-upon-Hull (1892), then Harrogate (1904), Sheffield (1905) and finally Hoylake (1967–69, 1970–74) when the event was discontinued.

== Finals ==
=== Men's singles ===
(Incomplete roll)

Year	Champion	Runner-up	Score
North Yorkshire Tournament
1884	(Ireland) Ernest Browne	(England) Marmaduke Constable	6–1, ret.
1885	(Ireland) Ernest Browne (2)	(England) E.W. Fletcher	6–2, 6–2, 6–4
North of England Championships
1886	(Ireland) Ernest Browne (3)	(England) Harry Grove	6–3, 4–6, 6–3, 2–6, 6–2
1887	(Ireland) Ernest Browne (4)	(England) Marmaduke Constable	6–2, 6–4, 6–2
1888	(England) Harry Grove	(United Kingdom) Henry Guy Nadin	6–1, 6–1, 6–1
1889	(United Kingdom) Percy Bateman Brown	(United Kingdom) David Davy	5–7, 6–2, 6–4, 6–2
1890	(United Kingdom) James Baldwin	(Ireland) Charles Henry Chaytor	9-7, 6–0, 6–0
1891	(United Kingdom) Harry Sibthorpe Barlow	(United Kingdom) James Baldwin	6–3, 6–2, 2–6, 7–5
1892	(United Kingdom) Harry Sibthorpe Barlow (2)	(Ireland) Grainger Chaytor	6-7, 6–1, 6–2, 6–1
1893	(United Kingdom) William Renshaw	(United Kingdom) Charles Gladstone Allen	w.o.
1894	(United Kingdom) Roy Allen	(Ireland) Joshua Pim	w.o.
1895	(Ireland) Grainger Chaytor	(United Kingdom) Harold Nisbet	7-9, 4–6, 6–4, 9-7, 6–1
1898	(Ireland) Grainger Chaytor (2)	(United Kingdom) Ernest Douglas Black	6–2, 6–2, 4–6, 6–3
1900	(Ireland) Grainger Chaytor (3)	(United Kingdom) Charles William Wade	6–2, 6–2, 6–3
1905	(United Kingdom) Roy Allen (2)	(United Kingdom) Charles Gladstone Allen	w.o.
1907	(United Kingdom) Walter Crawley	(United Kingdom) Arthur Lowe	6–1, 6–3
1908	(United Kingdom) Laurie Doherty	(United Kingdom) George Hillyard	6–1, 6–4, 6–2
1909	(United Kingdom) Laurie Doherty (2)	(United Kingdom) Gordon Lowe	7–5, 6–1, 6–3
1910	(United Kingdom) Laurie Doherty (3)	(United Kingdom) Gordon Lowe	6–3, 6–2, 6–2
1914/1918	Not held (due to world war one)		
1919	(Australia) Pat O'Hara Wood	(South Africa) Brian Norton	4–6, 6–2, 6–1, 10–8
1920	(South Africa) Thomas Yeo Sherwell	(United Kingdom) Clive Branfoot	4–6, 6–4, 7–5
1921	(South Africa) Brian Norton	(Ireland) D'Arcy McCrea	6–4, 6–3, 1–6, 2–6, 6–4
1922	(United Kingdom) Gordon Lowe	(United Kingdom) Randolph Lycett	6–2, 5–7, 7–9, 6–1, 6–2
1923	(India) Sydney Jacob	(Republic of Ireland) D'Arcy McCrea	6–3, 6–0, 6–2
1924	(South Africa) Louis Raymond	(India) Mohammed Sleem	6–2, 6–3, 6–3
1925	(United Kingdom) Charles Kingsley	(United Kingdom) Gordon Crole-Rees	6–4, 3–6, 6–4, 6–3
1926	(United Kingdom) Charles Kingsley (2)	(United Kingdom) Keats Lester	10–8, 6–0, 1–6, 8-6
1927	(United Kingdom) Colin Gregory	(United Kingdom) Randolph Lycett	6-8, 12–10, 9-7 ret.
1928	(New Zealand) Eskel Andrews	(United Kingdom) John Olliff	7–5, 6–4, 6–1
1929	(United Kingdom) Charles Kingsley (3)	(United Kingdom) Keats Lester	7-9, 6–1, 6–1, 6–4
1930	(New Zealand) Eskel Andrews (2)	(United Kingdom) Colin Gregory	6–0, 9-7
1931	(South Africa) Vernon Kirby	(United Kingdom) Jack Chamberlain	6–3, 6–3
1932	(Republic of Ireland) George Lyttleton Rogers	(India) Atri-Madan Mohan	6–2, 3–6, 6–1
1933	(New Zealand) Alan Stedman	(United Kingdom) Keats Lester	6–2, 7–5, 3–6, 6–3
1934	(Australia) Harry Hopman	(New Zealand) Alan Stedman	6–4, 6–2, 6–4
1935	(New Zealand) Alan Stedman (2)	(Republic of Ireland) George Lyttleton Rogers	6–2, 6–3
1936	(Australia) Adrian Quist	(United Kingdom) Charles Hare	6–1, 6–4, 6–2
1937	(Republic of Ireland) George Lyttleton Rogers (2)	(United Kingdom) Pat Sherwood	8-6, 6–3
1938	(United Kingdom) Don Butler	(United Kingdom) Jimmy Jones	6–2, 3–6, 6–3
1939	(United Kingdom) Jack Deloford	(New Zealand) Dennis Coombe	6–2, 6–2
1940/1945	Not held (due to world war two)		
1946	(Poland) Ignacy Tłoczyński	(United Kingdom) Don Butler	10–8, 6–2
1947	(Poland) Ignacy Tłoczyński (2)	(India) Ghaus Mohammed Khan	7–5, 6–4, 2–6, 6–3
1948	(Socialist Federal Republic of Yugoslavia) Franjo Kukuljević	(United Kingdom) Gerry Oakley	3–6, 6–1, 6–3, 6–4
1949	(Czechoslovakia) Jaroslav Drobný	(United Kingdom) Tony Mottram	6–1, 6–1, 6–3
1950	(Australia) Bill Sidwell	(Australia) Geoff Brown	2–6, 6–4, 6–1, 6–2
1951	(South Africa) Nigel Cockburn	(Poland) Czeslaw Spychala	7–5, 2–6, 6–1, 3–6, 6–1
1952	(South Africa) Eric Sturgess	(United States) Budge Patty	6–3, 3–6, 4–6, 6–1, 6–3
1953	(United Kingdom) Bobby Wilson	(United Kingdom) Billy Knight	6–3, 7–5
1954	(United Kingdom) Bobby Wilson (2)	(New Zealand) John Barry	6–4, 6–2
1955	(Sweden) Sven Davidson	(United Kingdom) Billy Knight	4–6, 6–0, 8–6, 6–0
1956	(United Kingdom) Bobby Wilson (3)	(United Kingdom) Tony Pickard	6–3, 6–3
1957	(United Kingdom) Alan Mills	(United Kingdom) Colin Hannam	7–5, 3–6, 6–3
1958	(Australia) Ashley Copper	(Australia) Mervyn Rose	4–6, 7–5, 10–12, 6–1, 14–12
1960	(New Zealand) Mark Otway	(New Zealand) John Roderick MacDonald	6–3, 6–4
1961	(United Kingdom) Lawrence Franklin Strong	(United Kingdom) R.A. Storey	6–3, 7–5
1962	(United Kingdom) Michael Waters	(United Kingdom) R.A. Storey	6–4, 6–2
1963	(United Kingdom) Colin McHugo	(Republic of Ireland) Harry Sheridan	7–5, 6–2
1964	(United Kingdom) Keith Wooldridge	(United Kingdom) Clay Iles	9-7, 6–3, 6–3
1965	(United Kingdom) Graham Stilwell	(United Kingdom) Keith Wooldridge	6–4, 6–3
1966	(New Zealand) Brian Fairlie	(India) Balaram Singh	7–5, 6–3
1967	(United Kingdom) Keith Wooldridge (2)	(Pakistan) Haroon Rahim	3–6, 6–4, 6–4
Open era
Liverpool Post North of England Championships
1968	(United Kingdom) Mike Sangster	(United States) Herb Fitzgibbon	2–6, 6–4, 12–10
Rothmans Open North of England Championships
1969	(Australia) Ray Ruffels	(New Zealand) Brian Fairlie	6–3, 6–3
1970	(Australia) John Newcombe	(Australia) Owen Davidson	4–6, 9–7, 6–4
1971	(Rhodesia) Andrew Pattison	(India) Jaidip Mukerjea	6–2, 5–7, 6–2
1972	(Rhodesia) Hank Irvine	(Australia) Ray Keldie	6–2, 4–6, 6–1
1973	(Australia) Bob Giltinan	(Australia) Owen Davidson	1–6, 6–3, 6–2
1974	(South Africa) Bernie Mitton	(South Africa) John Yuill	6–4, 6–4

=== Women's singles ===
(Incomplete roll)

Year	Champion	Runner-up	Score
North Yorkshire Tournament
1884	(United Kingdom) Constance Hodgson	(United Kingdom) Beatrice Wood	7–5, 6–3
1885	(United Kingdom) Mabel Boulton	(United Kingdom) Beatrice Wood	6–2, 6–2
North of England Championships
1886	(United Kingdom) Margaret Bracewell	(United Kingdom) Mabel Boulton	6–4, 8-6
1887	(United Kingdom) Margaret Bracewell (2)	(United Kingdom) Ann Dod	6–0, 6–1
1888	(United Kingdom) Margaret Bracewell (3)	(United Kingdom) Bertha Steedman	1–6, 6–4, 9–7, 6–4
1889	(United Kingdom) Edith Gurney	(United Kingdom) Beatrice Wood	6–4, 8-6
1890	(United Kingdom) Beatrice Wood	(United Kingdom) M. Crossley	6–4, 6–4
1891	(United Kingdom) Helen Jackson	(United Kingdom) Miss Pope	6–3, 6–1
1892	(United Kingdom) Helen Jackson (2)	(United Kingdom) Beatrice Wood Draffen	6–0, ?,
1892	(United Kingdom) Beatrice Wood Draffen (2)	(United Kingdom) Kate Nunneley	6–4, 7–5
1893	(United Kingdom) L. Clark	(United Kingdom) May Arbuthnot	6–4, 2–6, 6–2
1894	(United Kingdom) Beatrice Wood Draffen (3)	(United Kingdom) Katherine Grey	6–3, 6–1
1895	(United Kingdom) Lucy Kendal	(United Kingdom) Marion Crosby Morton	6–2, 6–1
1896	(United Kingdom) Lucy Kendal (2)	(United Kingdom) Beatrice Wood Draffen	?
1897	(United Kingdom) Lucy Kendal (3)	(United Kingdom) Muriel Robb	6–3, 6–0
1898	(United Kingdom) Katherine Grey	(United Kingdom) Alice Simpson Pickering	6–4, 6–4
1899	(United Kingdom) Alice Simpson Pickering	(United Kingdom) Bertha Holder	6–1, 6–4
1900	(United Kingdom) Alice Simpson Pickering (2)	(United Kingdom) Ethel Jessop	6–0, 6–2
1901	(United Kingdom) Dorothea Douglass	(United Kingdom) Alice Simpson Pickering	4–6, 10–8, 6–1
1902	(United Kingdom) Alice Simpson Pickering (3)	(United Kingdom) Lucy Kendal	6–3, 6–4
1903	(United Kingdom) Lucy Kendal (4)	(United Kingdom) Alice Simpson Pickering	3–6, 6–0, 7–5
1904	(United Kingdom) Lucy Kendal (5)	(United Kingdom) Gladys Eastlake-Smith	6–0, 4–6, 6–4
1905	(United Kingdom) Bertha Holder	(United Kingdom) N. Morton	11-9, 6–1
1906	(United Kingdom) Lucy Kendal (6)	(United Kingdom) Gladys Eastlake-Smith	6–4, 6–1
1907	(United Kingdom) Gladys Eastlake-Smith	(United Kingdom) Bertha Holder	6–0, 6–2
1908	(United Kingdom) Edith Boucher	(United Kingdom) Gladys Lamplough	6–1, 6–1
1909	(United Kingdom) Gladys Lamplough (2)	(United Kingdom) Helen Aitchison	6–4, 6–3
1910	(United Kingdom) Katie Slater Clegg	(United Kingdom) Rosamund Salusbury	6–2, 6–4
1911	(United Kingdom) Ethel Thomson Larcombe	(United Kingdom) Edith Hannam	6–2, 6–1
1912	(United Kingdom) Ethel Thomson Larcombe (2)	(United Kingdom) Violet Pinckney	6–2, 4–6, 6–3
1913	(United States) Elizabeth Ryan	(United Kingdom) Ethel Thomson Larcombe	6–3, 6–3
1914/1918	Not held (due to world war one)		
1919	(United States) Elizabeth Ryan (2)	(United Kingdom) Lesley Cadle	6–2, 6–1
1920	(United States) Elizabeth Ryan (3)	(United Kingdom) Eleanor Rose	6–1, 6–3
1921	(United States) Elizabeth Ryan (4)	(United Kingdom) Winifred McNair	6–3, 8-6
1922	(United Kingdom) Kathleen McKane	(United States) Elizabeth Ryan	6–2, 6–2
1923	(United Kingdom) Dorothy Shepherd-Barron	(United Kingdom) Phyllis Satterthwaite	walkover
1924	(United Kingdom) Kathleen McKane (2)	(United Kingdom) Dorothy Holman	6–2, 6–0
1925	(United Kingdom) Geraldine Beamish	(United Kingdom) Claire Beckingham	6–3, 6–2
1926	(United Kingdom) Ruth Watson	(United Kingdom) Joan Ridley	6–3, 6–1
1927	(United Kingdom) Joan Austin Lycett	(United Kingdom) Claire Beckingham	6–4, 3–6, 6–2
1928	(United Kingdom) Dorothy Shepherd Barron	(United Kingdom) Claire Beckingham	6–2, 6–3
1929	(United Kingdom) Joan Fry	(United Kingdom) Dorothy Anderson	6–3, 6–3
1930	(United Kingdom) Mary Heeley	(United Kingdom) Joan Fry	6–4, 6–3
1931	(United Kingdom) Mary Heeley (2)	(United Kingdom) Freda James	2–6, 6–1, 6–2
1932	(United Kingdom) Sheila Hewitt	(United Kingdom) Freda James	6–3, 5-5, retired
1933	(United Kingdom) Kay Stammers	(United Kingdom) Susan Noel	10–8, 5–7, 6–0
1934	(Australia) Joan Hartigan	(United Kingdom) Susan Noel	2–6, 6–1, 10–8
1935	(United Kingdom) Mary Heeley (3)	(Chile) Anita Lizana	6–3, 6–8, 6–4
1936	(United Kingdom) Mary Heeley (4)	(United Kingdom) Florence Ford	5–7, 6–4, 6–2
1937	(United Kingdom) Mary Heeley (5)	(United Kingdom) Denise Huntbach	6–1, 6–1
1938	(United Kingdom) Valerie Scott	(United Kingdom) Florence Ford	6–2, 3–6, 6–3
1939	(United Kingdom) Jean Nicoll	(Czechoslovakia) Zora Nechilova	6–3, 6–2
1940/1945	Not held (due to world war two)		
1946	(United Kingdom) Jean Quertier	(United Kingdom) Betty Clements Hilton	6–3, 6–1
1947	(United Kingdom) Gem Hoahing	(United Kingdom) Valerie Cooper	6–2, 6–0
1948	(United Kingdom) Gem Hoahing (2)	(United Kingdom) Natalia Zinovieff	6–2, 7–5
1949	(United Kingdom) Gem Hoahing (3)	(Australia) Joyce Fitch	6–3, 6–2
1950	(Australia) Thelma Coyne Long	(United Kingdom) Jean Quertier	6–4, 7–5
1951	(United Kingdom) Billie Woodgate	(United Kingdom) Barbara Knapp	4–6, 6–2, 6–1
1952	(United Kingdom) Jean Walker-Smith	(Australia) Beryl Penrose	7–5, 6–2
1953	(United Kingdom) Georgie Woodgate	(United Kingdom) Margaret Harrison	6–1, 2–6, 6–4
1954	(New Zealand) Judy Burke	(United Kingdom) Angela Buxton	4–6, 6–4, 6–4
1955	(Australia) Mary Carter	(Australia) Beryl Penrose	6–3, 4–6, 6–3
1956	(United Kingdom) Ann Haydon	(United Kingdom) Elaine Watson	6–2, 7–5
1957	(United Kingdom) Georgie Woodgate (2)	(United Kingdom) Rosemary Deloford	6–3, 4–6, 6–4
1958	(South Africa) Heather Brewer-Segal	(United Kingdom) Mary Bevis Hawton	6–1, 6–4
1959	(United Kingdom) Elaine Shenton	Mrs C. Clark	3–6, 6–2, 6–2
1960	(United Kingdom) Susan Waters	(United Kingdom) Jenny Young	5–7, 6–2, 6–3
1961	(United Kingdom) Ann McAlpine	(United Kingdom) Vivienne Cox	6–4, 7–5
1962	(United Kingdom) J. Macintosh	(United Kingdom) E. Smith	6–3, 6–4
1963	(United Kingdom) E. Smith	(United Kingdom) Marilyn Greenwood	7–5, 6–4
1964	(United Kingdom) Robin Blakelock-Lloyd	(United Kingdom) Nell Truman	6–4, 1–6, 7–5
1965	(United Kingdom) Stephanie Percival	(United Kingdom) Sally Holdsworth	6–3, 6–2
1966	(United Kingdom) Elizabeth Starkie	(United Kingdom) Robin Blakelock-Lloyd	6–1, 6–3
1967	(United Kingdom) Virginia Wade	(Australia) Judy Tegart	6–3 6–4
1967	(United Kingdom) Robin Blakelock-Lloyd (2)	(United Kingdom) Sally Holdsworth	6–2, 6–2
Open era
Liverpool Post North of England Championships
1968	(Australia) Margaret Smith Court	(United Kingdom) Virginia Wade	6–2, 6–4
Rothmans Open North of England Championships
1969	(United Kingdom) Virginia Wade (2)	(United Kingdom) Christine Truman Janes	0–6, 6–4, 8-6
1970	(Australia) Evonne Goolagong	(Australia) Kerry Melville	2–6, 6–2, 6–1
1971	(United States) Billie Jean Moffitt King	(United States) Rosie Casals	6–3 6–3
1972	(Australia) Evonne Goolagong (2)	(Netherlands) Betty Stove	divided title
1973	(United States) Patti Hogan	(United States) Sharon Walsh	11-9, 4–6, 6–4
1974	(United Kingdom) Jackie Fayter	(United States) Patti Hogan	6–0, 7–5

== Tournament records ==
- Most men's overall singles titles: (Ireland) Ernest Browne (4)
- Most men's NOE singles titles: (United Kingdom) Laurie Doherty & (United Kingdom) Charles Kingsley & (United Kingdom) Bobby Wilson (3)
- Most women's NOE singles titles: (United Kingdom) Lucy Kendal (6)

== See also ==
- North of England Hard Court Championships

== Sources ==
- Jeffreys, Kevin (22 April 2021). "The Illustrious History of Tennis in Scarborough". on-magazine.co.uk. On: Yorkshire Magazine. Retrieved 4 October 2022.
- Lake, Robert J. (3 October 2014). A Social History of Tennis in Britain. Oxford: Routledge. ISBN 978-1-134-44557-8.
