= Beatrice Langrishe =

Irish tennis player

- Country (sports): United Kingdom
- Born: 1863; Knocktopher, County Kilkenny, Ireland
- Died: March 1939 (age 77); London, England
- Turned pro: 1879 (amateur circuit)
- Retired: 1890

Singles
- Career titles: 2

Maria Cecilia "Beatrice" Langrishe (1863 - March 1939) was an Irish tennis player who was active from 1879 to 1890 and won 2 career singles titles. She was a singles finalist at the Irish Championships in 1883.

== Career ==
She played her first tournament in 1879 at the inaugural Irish Championships meeting in Dublin where she was beaten in first round in three sets by eventual finalist Miss D. Meldon. In 1881 she reached the quarter finals of the Waterford Open, and was a finalist in the mixed doubles event partnered with William Renshaw that year. In 1882 she reached the singles final of the County Kilkenny Tournament where she lost to her sister May Langrishe, and the women's doubles final of the Cheltenham Championships which she won with Constance Smith. In 1883 she reached the final of her first major tournament at the Irish Championships, where she was defeated in straight sets by her sister May.

In 1886 she reached the finals of the Killiney and Ballybrack Championships before losing to her sister May in three sets. At the Irish Championships that year she reached the finals of the women's doubles event with her sister May, where they lost to Connie Butler and Louisa Martin. She won her first title at the Clifton Open in June 1886 against Nora Pope. In 1887 she reached the finals of the Welsh Championships at Penarth, but lost to Maud Watson, the same year she was a finalist in the mixed doubles event at the Teignmouth and Shaldon Open partnered with Wilfred Milne where they lost to Maud Watson and Ernest Wool Lewis. The same season she was also a losing finalist in the singles at the Bournemouth Open to Constance Bryan, but won the women's doubles event with Constance. In 1889 she reached the finals of the Sussex Championships where she lost to her sister May Langrishe.

She was a member of the Fitzwilliam Lawn Tennis Club and represented them in the tournaments she participated in.

== Family ==
She was born in Ireland in 1863, one of five daughters of Sir James Langrishe, 4th Baronet and his wife Adela de Blois Eccles (Lady Langrishe). Her sisters May Langrishe and Adela Langrishe were also accomplished lawn tennis players. She married Colonel Henry Francis Thornhill Fisher on 21 December 1901 in Chelsea, London, England. She died in London in March 1939 at the age of 77.
