= Farndon Park =

Park in Clive, New Zealand

Coordinates: 39°34′51.75″S 176°54′50.28″E

- Interactive map of Farndon Park

Ground information
- Location: Clive, New Zealand
- Country: New Zealand
- Establishment: 1892 (first recorded match)

Team information
Hawke's Bay	(1892–1896)
- As of 2 November 2011; Source: Ground profile

Farndon Park, also known as Farndon Park Domain, is a public park in Clive, Hawke's Bay, New Zealand. It hosts many sporting events, including swimming, tennis, rugby union, and rowing on the adjacent Clive River. It was formerly also a cricket ground.

== History ==
The eight-hectare (20-acre) reserve was purchased by the colonial government in 1870 from its Māori owners with the intention of developing it as a botanical gardens.

Hawke's Bay played four first-class cricket matches at Farndon Park. Three of those came in 1892, against Taranaki, Wellington and Otago. The fourth came four years later when the touring Queensland side visited. The Otago Witness reporter in 1892 described the ground as "a perfect likeness of a good English private ground". Cricket is no longer played at the park.

Farndon Park was the venue for the first New Zealand Tennis Championships, held in December 1885.
