= Chapel Allerton Open =

Tennis tournament in England

Defunct tennis tournament
- Tour: ILTF
- Founded: 1884; 141 years ago
- Abolished: 1981; 44 years ago
- Location: Chapel Allerton, Leeds, West Yorkshire, England.
- Venue: Chapel Allerton Lawn Tennis & Squash Club (f.1880)
- Surface: Grass- outdoors

The Chapel Allerton Open was a combined men's and women's grass court tennis tournament founded in 1884 as the Chapel Allerton LTC Tournament. The tournament was organised by the Chapel Allerton Lawn Tennis & Squash Club, Chapel Allerton, Leeds, West Yorkshire, England. The tournament ran as part of the worldwide circuit until 1981 when it was branded as the Mobil 1 Tournament for sponsorship reasons.

== History ==
Chapel-Allerton LTC Tournament was founded in 1884. The tournament was staged at the Chapel Allerton Lawn Tennis Club (f.1880.). By the 1890s the tournament was branded as the Chapel Allerton Open Tournament. By the late 1930s the tournament was branded as the Chapel Allerton (Leeds) Open. By the 1950s the event was rebranded as the Chapel Allerton Open. The tournament ran as part of the worldwide circuit until 1981 when its final edition was sponsored by the American oil company Mobil, and was branded as the Mobil 1 Tournament. The event is still being staged today as the Chapel Allerton Seniors Open Tournament.

Notable winners of the men's singles title included; John Hartley (two time Wimbledon Champion), Tony Mottram, Ip Koon Hung, Don Black, Bob Rheinberger and John Alexander. Previous winners of women's singles title included Phyllis Carr Satterthwaite, Elsie Goldsack, Hilde Krahwinkel Sperling, Helena Straubeova, Jane O'Hara, Sally Holdsworth, and Elaine Shenton.

== Venue ==
The tournament was established at the Chapel Allerton Lawn Tennis Club that was founded in 1880 at the heart of Chapel Allerton with 17 members. Today the tennis club has grown from five grass tennis courts and a wooden pavilion, to three indoor tennis courts, nine artificial tennis courts, four grass courts, and a clubhouse.
