= Kilkenny County and City Open =

Defunct tennis tournament
- Founded: 1882; 143 years ago
- Abolished: 1920; 105 years ago
- Location: Archersfield, Kilkenny, County Kilkenny, Ireland
- Venue: Kilkenny County and City Lawn Tennis Club
- Surface: Grass

The Kilkenny County and City Open was an open grass court tennis tournament founded in 1882 as the County Kilkenny Tournament at Kilkenny, County Kilkenny, Ireland. In 1884 the event was renamed as the Kilkenny County and City Tournament. The tournament ran until 1920.

== History ==
The County Kilkenny Tournament was a late 19th century tennis event first staged in 1882 at Kilkenny, County Kilkenny, Ireland. By 1884 the tournament was renamed as the Kilkenny County and City Tournament, and was held at the Kilkenny County and City Lawn Tennis Club, Archersfield, Kilkenny. The held up to 1920 when it was called the Kilkenny County and City Open.

This tournament was predominantly an Irish affair, featuring notable Irish players such as Ernest Browne, Grainger Chaytor, May Langrishe and Mabel Cahill and English players such as Alfred Beamish, Jack Hillyard and Mabel Parton.

== Finals ==
=== Men's Singles ===
(Incomplete roll)

Year	Winners	Runners-up	Score
1882	(Ireland) Michael Gallwey McNamara	(United Kingdom) George Montague Butterworth	6-3, 6–3, 6-2
1885	(Ireland) Tom Campion	(Ireland) Charles Henry Chaytor	6-4, 6-3
1886	(Ireland) Ernest Browne	(Ireland) Willoughby Hamilton	6-4, 4–6, 6–3.
1887	(Ireland) Grainger Chaytor	(Ireland) Francis Slade-Gully	6-1, 6-1
1890	(Ireland) Manliffe Francis Goodbody	(Ireland) Toler Roberts Garvey	6-4, 6-4
1908	(United Kingdom) Alfred Beamish	(Ireland) Louis Meldon	6-2, 3–6, 7-5
1920	(United Kingdom) Jack Hillyard	(Republic of Ireland) D'Arcy McCrea	6-2, 1–6, 6-3

=== Women's Singles ===
(Incomplete roll)

Year	Winners	Runners-up	Score
1882	(Ireland) May Langrishe	(Ireland) Beatrice Langrishe	?
1883	(Ireland) May Langrishe	(Ireland) Mary Lysaght	6-1, 6–2, 6-0
1884	(Ireland) Mabel Cahill	(Ireland) May Langrishe	6-4, 6-4
1885	(Ireland) May Langrishe	(Ireland) Miss Neville	6-1, 6–8, 6-4
1886	(Ireland) Mabel Cahill	(Ireland) Beatrice Langrishe	7-5, 6–2, 6-4
1887	(Ireland) Jennie Power	(Ireland) E. McCheane	6-8, 6–4, 4–6, 6–2, 7-5
1908	(Ireland) Ruth Dyas Durlacher	(United Kingdom) Mabel Parton	6-4, 4–6, 6-2
1920	(Republic of Ireland) Hilda Wallis	(Republic of Ireland) Phoebe Blair-White	6-2, 7-5

=== Mix Doubles ===
(Incomplete roll)

Year	Winners	Runners-up	Score
1885	(Ireland) Francis R. Swayne (Ireland) Mabel Cahill	(Ireland) R.P. Hamilton (Ireland) Adela Langrishe	8-6, 8–6, 3–6, 3–6, 9-7
1886	(Ireland) Ernest Browne (Ireland) May Langrishe	(Ireland) Francis R. Swayne (Ireland) Mabel Cahill	6-1, 6–1, 6-1
1887	(Ireland) R. Plunkett-Greene (Ireland) Miss Rotheram	(Ireland) Francis Slade-Gully (Ireland) A.F. Gregory	6-4, 3–6, 6-2
