= Hull Open =

Defunct tennis tournament
- Founded: 1884; 141 years ago
- Abolished: 1956; 69 years ago
- Location: Kingston upon Hull, Yorkshire, England
- Venue: Westbourne Avenue Grounds (1884–90); Ferens Recretation Grounds (1921–1959)
- Surface: Grass

The Hull Open was annual men's and women's grass court tennis tournament founded as the Hull Westbourne Avenue Open Tournament in 1884. From 1905 to 1914 the tournament was co-branded as the East Yorkshire Championships. The tournament was organised by the Hull Lawn Tennis Club, Kingston-Upon-Hull, East Riding of Yorkshire, England. The tournament ran until 1956.

== History ==
In 1884 the Hull Westbourne Avenue Open Tournament was organised by the Hull Lawn Tennis Club (f.1880), and played at the Westbourne Avenue Grounds. In 1891 that tournament was renamed as the Hull Open Tournament a grass court tennis event. In 1905 the tournament was co-branded as the East Yorkshire Championships, a county level event that lasted until 1914. Following World War I the tournament resumed under the name of the Hull Open. Despite being discontinued because of World War II it resumed thereafter through till at least 1956.

The men's event though consisting of mainly British Isles players, did attract international players, the women's event started to attract international players after the Second World War. Senior tour tennis ceased to be staged in Kingston-Upon-Hull until 2002 when an event for women was established called the Hull Indoor Tournament that ran until 2006.

== Finals ==
=== Men's Singles ===
Incomplete Roll included

Year	Winner	Runner-up	Score
Hull Westbourne Avenue Open Tournament
1884	(United Kingdom) W.S. Wright	(United Kingdom) William Francis Wells-Cole	w.o.
1885	(Ireland) William Henry Mahon	(England) Gilbert Mahon	w.o.
1886	(Ireland) William Henry Mahon (2)	(United Kingdom) L. Harrison	6–1, 6–2, 6–2
1887	(England) Frederick T. Bradbury	(United Kingdom) L. Harrison	2–6, 8–6, 6–2
1890	(Ireland) William Henry Mahon (3)	(England) Geoffrey Heathcote-Hacker	9–7, 6–3
Hull Open Tournament
1891	(United Kingdom) H.L. Winter	(United Kingdom) E.M. Samson	w.o.
also valid as East Yorkshire Championships
1905	(England) Ernest Watson	(England) Sidney Watson	6–2, 6–3
1906	(England) Ernest Watson (2)	(England) Sidney Watson	7–5, 2–6, 6–4
1908	(England) Ernest Watson (3)	(United Kingdom) Alec Smith	6–2, 6–0
1909	(Australia) Les Poidevin	(England) Sidney Watson	6–3, 6–4
1910	(England) George Simond	(England) Mark Day Hick	6–2, 6–1, 6–2
1915/1918	(Not held due to world war one)		
Hull Open
1935	(United States) Clayton Lee (Teddy) Burwell	(United States) Dave N. Jones	6–1, 6–4
1936	(England) Ronald Shayes	(Netherlands) Hans van Swol	6–3, 6–0
1937	(Netherlands) Hans van Swol	(United Kingdom) Edmund John David	6–3, 9–7
1938	(United Kingdom) Jimmy Jones	(United Kingdom) Murray Deloford	6–3, 6–1
1939	(Romania) Constantin Tanacescu	(United Kingdom) Jimmy Jones	6–2, 4–6, 6–2
1940/1946	(Not held due to world war two)		
1947	(India) Ghaus Mohammed Khan	(India) K.L. Ahmed	6–4, 8–10, 6–4
1948	(United Kingdom) John B. Griffith	(United Kingdom) Teddy Tinling	6–4, 7–5
1949	(United Kingdom) George Godsell	(United Kingdom) Teddy Tinling	6–3, 6–2
1950	(Australia) Geoff Brown	(South Africa) Brian W. Rooke	7–5, 6–0
1951	(South Africa) Nigel Cockburn	(Australia) Peter Cawthorn	6–4, 6–1
1952	(Australia) Peter Cawthorn	(United States) Steven Deaderick Potts	6–2, 7–5
1953	(United Kingdom) Robert J. (Bob) Lee	(United Kingdom) Anthony Starte	7–5, 3–6, 6–3
1954	(New Zealand) Jeffrey Ellis Robson	(India) Islam Ahmad	6–3, 9–7
1955	(United Kingdom) Ivor Warwick	(Australia) Arthur R. Gubb	6–4, 6–1
1956	(United States) Matt Rainey	(United Kingdom) J.S. Fluck	6–1, 8–6
	Tournament ends		

=== Women's singles ===
Incomplete Roll

Year	Winner	Runner-up	Score
Hull Westbourne Avenue Open Tournament
1886	(United Kingdom) Constance Hodgson	(United Kingdom) Miss Alfrey	6–3, 6–2
1887	(United Kingdom) Constance Hodgson (2)	(United Kingdom) Angel Smith	3–6, 6–4, 6–3
1889	(United Kingdom) Katherine Grey	(United Kingdom) Miss Barber	6–3, 6–1
1890	(United Kingdom) Katherine Grey (2)	(United Kingdom) E. Lee-Smith	6–1, 5–7, 9–7
Hull Open Tournament
1891	(United Kingdom) Catherine Crosby	(United Kingdom) G. Harrison	w.o.
1892	(United Kingdom) Helen Jackson	(United Kingdom) Beatrice Draffen	6–0, 6–0
1901	(United Kingdom) Miss Robinson	(United Kingdom) Bertha Holder	6–1, 1–6, 6–3
also valid as East Yorkshire Championships
1906	(United Kingdom) Marion Crosby Morton	(United Kingdom) Mrs J.B. Perrett	2–6, 6–4, 6–2
1908	(United Kingdom) Bertha Holder	(United Kingdom) Eleanor Rose	6–1, 6–2
1910	(United Kingdom) Helen Aitchison	(United Kingdom) Bertha Holder	6–1, 6–4
1911	(United Kingdom) Eleanor Rose	(United Kingdom) Mrs F. Robinson	6–2, 6–2
1912	(United Kingdom) Eleanor Rose (2)	(United Kingdom) Kathleen Aitchison	7–5, 9–11, 6–2
1913	(United Kingdom) Eleanor Rose (3)	(United Kingdom) Kathleen Aitchison	1–6, 6–2 6–4
1914	(United Kingdom) Mrs J. Billyeald	(United Kingdom) Susannah Cadman Wilford	6–3, 6–2
1915/1920	(Not held due to world war one)		
Hull Open
1921	(United Kingdom) Kathleen Aitchison	(United Kingdom) Norah Fosdick Middleton	6–2, 6–2
1922	(United Kingdom) Kathleen Aitchison (2)	(United Kingdom) Joan Austin	4–6, 8–6, 6–2
1923	(United Kingdom) Joan Austin	(United Kingdom) Eleanor Rose	6–3, 6–2
1924	(United Kingdom) Kathleen Aitchison (3)	(United Kingdom) Elsie Goodlass Holtby	6–3, 6–1
1925	(United Kingdom) Elsie Goodlass Holtby	(United Kingdom) Norah Fosdick Middleton	6–3, 6–3
1926	(United Kingdom) Betty Dix	(United Kingdom) Norah Fosdick Middleton	6–3, 6–2
1927	(United Kingdom) Dorothy Shaw	(United Kingdom) Kate Anningson	6–1, 6–0
1928	(United Kingdom) Betty Dix (2)	(United Kingdom) Kate Anningson	6–2, 6–3
1929	(United Kingdom) Dorothy Shaw Jameson	(United Kingdom) Betty Dix	6–1, 6–4
1930	(United Kingdom) Betty Dix (3)	(United Kingdom) Joan Reid-Thomas Strawson	6–4, 6–2
1931	(United Kingdom) Joan Reid-Thomas Strawson	(United Kingdom) Betty Dix	6–2, 6–2
1932	(United Kingdom) Edie Rudd	(United Kingdom) Nancy Hellewell	3–6, 6–1, 8–6
1933	(United Kingdom) Barbara Stampe	(United Kingdom) Gladys Clarke-Jervoise	1–6, 6–3, 6–4
1934	(United Kingdom) Edie Rudd Luxton (2)	(United Kingdom) Freda Scott	6–1, 6–2
1935	(United Kingdom) A. Sargent	(United Kingdom) Patricia Owen	6–4, 6–3
1936	(United Kingdom) Gladys Southwell	(Netherlands) Gertruid Terwindt	6–4, 7–5
1937	(Netherlands) Gertruid Terwindt	(United Kingdom) Ruth Armstrong Kirk	6–2, 6–3
1938	(United Kingdom) Ruth Armstrong Kirk	(United Kingdom) Mary Lincoln	6–3, 6–4
1939	(United Kingdom) Ruth Armstrong Kirk (2)	(United Kingdom) Mary Lincoln	w.o.
1940/1946	(Not held due to world war two)		
1947	(United Kingdom) Mrs Dowling	(United Kingdom) M. Dickenson	8–6, 7–5
1948	(Netherlands) Mrs B. Scholten	(United Kingdom) S. Tickler	5–7, 7–5, 6–4
1949	(United Kingdom) Georgie Woodgate	(United Kingdom) Billie Woodgate	6–4, 6–4
1950	(United Kingdom) Sheila Speight	(United Kingdom) Mrs G. Brown	6–1, 6–3
1951	(United Kingdom) Jean Trower	(United Kingdom) Valerie Lewis	5–7, 7–5, 6–4
1952	(United Kingdom) Shirley Bloomer	(United Kingdom) Valerie Lewis	4–6, 6–4, 6–2
1953	(United Kingdom) Shirley Bloomer (2)	(United Kingdom) Valerie Lewis	6–1, 6–3
1954	(United Kingdom) Shirley Bloomer (3)	(United Kingdom) Jean Petchell	7–5, 6–2
1955	(United Kingdom) Valerie Lewis	(United Kingdom) Anthea Gibb	6–4, 6–1
1956	(United Kingdom) Mrs C. Dunn	(United Kingdom) Mrs M. Beecroft	7–5, 2–6, 6–2
	Tournament ends		
