= Waterloo Tournament =

Defunct tennis tournament
- Event name: Waterloo Tournament
- Tour: NLTA Circuit
- Founded: 1881
- Abolished: 1897
- Editions: 17
- Location: Waterloo; Liverpool; Lancashire, Great Britain

The Waterloo Tournament also known as the Waterloo LTC Tournament was a men's and women's grass court tennis tournament held in Waterloo, Liverpool, Lancashire, Great Britain from 1881 to 1897.

== History ==
The Waterloo Tournament was an early 19th century tennis event first staged around June 1881 at Waterloo, Liverpool, Lancashire, England. The first winner of the men's singles was England's Richard Richardson. The final known edition was in 1897 was played at Aigburth Cricket Ground that was again won by Frank Riseley. It was a featured regeular series event on the Amateur Tennis Tour (1877-1912). Three Wimbledon men's finalists played this event during the course of its run Richard Richardson, Donald Stewart and Frank Riseley. The 1883 and 1897 editions were held at Aigburth Cricket Ground, Liverpool. The 1885 women's event was won by future Wimbledon champion Lottie Dod.

== Finals ==
Notes: Challenge round: The final round of a tournament, in which the winner of a single-elimination phase faces the previous year's champion, who plays only that one match. The challenge round was used in the early history of tennis (from 1877 through 1921) in some tournaments not all.

* eight of the twelve editions had a challenge round

=== Men's singles ===
Included:

Year	Champions	Runners-up	Score
1881	(United Kingdom of Great Britain and Ireland) Richard T. Richardson	(United Kingdom of Great Britain and Ireland) F.W. Jones	6-0 6-0
1882	(United Kingdom of Great Britain and Ireland) William John Down	(United Kingdom of Great Britain and Ireland) R.H. Jones	?
1883 (Note: 1883 edition was held at Aigburth Cricket Ground Liverpool)	(United Kingdom of Great Britain and Ireland) Joseph Bruce Ismay	(United Kingdom of Great Britain and Ireland) William Gerald Barker	6-3 6-1
1884	(United Kingdom of Great Britain and Ireland) Donald Charles Stewart	(United Kingdom of Great Britain and Ireland) William John Bush-Salmon	9-7 6-1 6-2
1885	(United Kingdom of Great Britain and Ireland) Charles Stananought	(United Kingdom of Great Britain and Ireland) Jacob Gaitskell Brown	7-5 6-3 5-7 7-5
1886	(United Kingdom of Great Britain and Ireland) Jacob Gaitskell Brown	(United Kingdom of Great Britain and Ireland) William Parkfield Wethered	6-3 6-2 2-6 3-6 6-1
1887 (Note: 1887 edition there was a challenge round)	(United Kingdom of Great Britain and Ireland) Jacob Gaitskell Brown	(United Kingdom of Great Britain and Ireland) William Parkfield Wethered	6-3 6-4 2-6 8-6
1888 (Note: 1888 edition there was a challenge round)	(United Kingdom of Great Britain and Ireland) Jacob Gaitskell Brown	(United Kingdom of Great Britain and Ireland) Herbert Chipp	w.o.
1889	(United Kingdom of Great Britain and Ireland) John Redfern Deykin	(United Kingdom of Great Britain and Ireland) William Dod	6-2 7-5 7-5
1890	(United Kingdom of Great Britain and Ireland) John Redfern Deykin	(United Kingdom of Great Britain and Ireland) William Parkfield Wethered	6-0 1-6 6-2 6-2
1891 (Note: 1891 edition there was a challenge round)	(United Kingdom of Great Britain and Ireland) Jacob Gaitskell Brown	(United Kingdom of Great Britain and Ireland) John Redfern Deykin	6-1 6-0 5-7 8-6
1892 (Note: 1892 edition there was a challenge round)	(United Kingdom of Great Britain and Ireland) Andrew Laurie Macfie	(United Kingdom of Great Britain and Ireland) Jacob Gaitskell Brown	3-6 6-3 6-2 6-4
1893 (Note: 1893 edition there was a challenge round)	(United Kingdom of Great Britain and Ireland) John Charles Kay	(United Kingdom of Great Britain and Ireland) Andrew Laurie Macfie	10-8 3-6 6-3 4-6 6-2
1894 (Note: 1894 edition there was a challenge round)	(United Kingdom of Great Britain and Ireland) T.J. Walmsley	(United Kingdom of Great Britain and Ireland) John Charles Kay	?
1895 (Note: 1895 edition there was a challenge round)	(United Kingdom of Great Britain and Ireland) Frank L. Riseley	(United Kingdom of Great Britain and Ireland) T.J. Walmsley	6-1 6-1 6-0
1896 (Note: 1896 there was no final match resulting in a walkover w.o.)	(United Kingdom of Great Britain and Ireland) Frank L. Riseley	(United Kingdom of Great Britain and Ireland) Arthur Henry Riseley	w.o.
1897 (Note: 1897 there was a challenge round and the event was staged once again in Aigburth.)	(United Kingdom of Great Britain and Ireland) Frank L. Riseley	(United Kingdom of Great Britain and Ireland) Arthur Henry Riseley	0-8 6-4

=== Men's doubles ===
Year	Champions	Runners-up	Score
1881	(United Kingdom of Great Britain and Ireland) Johan Frederick Caroe (United Kingdom of Great Britain and Ireland) Thomas Dyson Rayner	(England) Mr Churton (England) Mr Curry	6-4, 6-5
1882	(United Kingdom of Great Britain and Ireland) Frederick William Jones (United Kingdom of Great Britain and Ireland) Reginald Herbert Jones	(United Kingdom of Great Britain and Ireland) Charles Stananought (England) Joseph Stananought	def.

=== Women's singles ===
Year	Champions	Runners-up	Score
1881	(England) Kate Rayner	(England) Lynn Cheetham	6-2, 3-6, 7-5
1882	(England) Edith Davies	(England) Miss Eckersley	?
1884	(United Kingdom) Margaret Bracewell	(United Kingdom of Great Britain and Ireland) E. Gordon	6-4, 4–6, 6–4, 6-1
1885	(England) Lottie Dod	(United Kingdom) Margaret Bracewell	6-4, 6-2
1887	(England) Miss Pickthall	(United Kingdom of Great Britain and Ireland) Mary Pick	7-5, 6-1
1888	(England) Annie Dod	(England) Katherine Hill	4-6, 6–0, 6-3
1889	(England) Mary Pick	(United Kingdom of Great Britain and Ireland) Miss Pickthall	6-1, 6-3

=== Women's doubles ===
Year	Champions	Runners-up	Score
1881	(United Kingdom of Great Britain and Ireland) Miss F. Berry (United Kingdom of Great Britain and Ireland) Miss F. Helder	(United Kingdom of Great Britain and Ireland) Miss Jardine (United Kingdom of Great Britain and Ireland) Miss Jones	6-2, 3–6, 6-1
1882	(United Kingdom of Great Britain and Ireland) Edith Davies (United Kingdom of Great Britain and Ireland) Miss Cheetham	(United Kingdom) Margaret Bracewell (United Kingdom of Great Britain and Ireland) Miss Snow	6-2, 3–6, 6-1

=== Mix doubles ===
Year	Champions	Runners-up	Score
1881	(United Kingdom of Great Britain and Ireland) Mr J.F. Carde (United Kingdom of Great Britain and Ireland) Miss K. Rayner	(United Kingdom of Great Britain and Ireland) Mr E. Bucknell (United Kingdom of Great Britain and Ireland) Alice Bagnall-Wild	6-1, 12-10
1882	(United Kingdom of Great Britain and Ireland) Mr D.W. Lee (United Kingdom of Great Britain and Ireland) Edith Davies	(United Kingdom of Great Britain and Ireland) Charles Stananought (United Kingdom of Great Britain and Ireland) Miss Snow	def.

== Sources ==
- "Tournament – Waterloo". www.tennisarchives.com. Tennis Archives. 2017.
