= East Gloucestershire Championships =

Defunct tennis tournament
- Founded: 1879
- Abolished: 1969
- Editions: 55
- Location: Cheltenham; Gloucestershire; Great Britain
- Venue: Cheltenham LTC (1879-1904); East Gloucestershire LTC (1905-69)
- Surface: Wood (indoor); Grass - outdoor

The East Gloucestershire Championships was a combined men's and women's grass court tennis tournament founded in 1879 as the Cheltenham Lawn Tennis Championships. In 1905 it was renamed the East Gloucestershire Championships after it moved to a new venue. It ran annually with breaks until 1969.

== History ==
The East Gloucestershire Championships was played at the Cheltenham Lawn Tennis Club, Cheltenham, Great Britain the tournament was initially played on indoor hard courts (partially covered) from 1879 to 1881 then switched to outdoor grass courts there were fifty five editions of the event.

== Finals ==
Incomplete list of tournaments included:

=== Men's singles ===
Year	Champion	Runner up	Score
1879	(United Kingdom) William Renshaw	(Ireland) Vere St. Leger Goold	6-4 6-3 5-6 6-4
1880	(United Kingdom) Ernest Renshaw	(Ireland) Ernest Browne	6-2 3-6 6-1 8-6
1881	(Ireland) Ernest Browne	(United Kingdom) Robert Braddell	6-3 6-3 3-6 6-0
1882	(United Kingdom) Robert Braddell	(United Kingdom) Arthur Walton Fuller	6-1 6-4
1883	(United Kingdom) Donald Stewart	(United Kingdom) William Bush-Salmon	6-0 6-1 6-0
1884	(United Kingdom) Donald Stewart	(United States) Richard Sears	10-8 6-1 6-3
1885	(Ireland) Ernest Browne	(United Kingdom) Charles Ross	6-4 6-3 6-2
1886	(Ireland) Ernest Browne	(United States) James Dwight	6-3 6-2 2-6 9-7
1887	(Ireland) Ernest Browne	(United States) James Dwight	3-6 6-3 6-1 4-6 6-2
1888	(United Kingdom) Harry Grove	(Ireland) Ernest Browne	7-5 6-3 4-6 2-6 ret.
1889	(United Kingdom) George Hillyard	(United Kingdom) James Baldwin	6-1 6-1 2-6 4-6 6-3
1890	(Ireland) Harold Mahony	(United Kingdom) James Baldwin	6-4 1-6 6-1 6-4
1891	(United Kingdom) Ernest Wool Lewis	(United Kingdom) Harry S. Barlow	6-4 6-3 6-2
1892	(Ireland) Manliffe Goodbody	(United Kingdom) Sydney Howard Smith	6-1 8-6 7-5
1914	(United Kingdom) Hope Crisp	(United Kingdom) Charles P. Dixon	5-7 6-2 6-2 8-6
1920	(United Kingdom) George Thomas	(United Kingdom) C. J. Brierley	6-2 6-1
1922	(United Kingdom) George Thomas	(United Kingdom) Clinton McIlquham	6-3 6-0 6-1
1923	(United Kingdom) C. J. Brierley	(Denmark) Henning Larsen	6-3 6-3 6-3
1924	(United Kingdom) George Thomas	(United Kingdom) G. W. Lucas	0-6 6-2 6-1 8-6
1925	(United Kingdom) Nigel Sharpe	(United Kingdom) Nigel Jones.	6-3 6-2 6-1
1926	(United Kingdom) R. G. Bernard	(United Kingdom) Clinton McIlquham	7-5 5-7 6-3
1927	(United Kingdom) Nigel Sharpe	(United Kingdom) R. D. England	10-8 8-6 6-0
1928	(United Kingdom) J. D Page	(Republic of Ireland) Henry B. Purcell	6-2 3-6 9-7
1929	(United Kingdom) Eric Peters	(United Kingdom) R. G. Bernard	6-2 0-6 6-3
1930	(United Kingdom) George Godsell	(Republic of Ireland) Noel G. Holmes	8-6 6-0
1931	(United Kingdom) R. N. A. Leyton	(United Kingdom) Clinton McIlquham	6-4 6-4
1932	(United Kingdom) George Godsell	(United Kingdom) C. P. Luck	6-3 5-7 6-3 6-3
1934	(United Kingdom) George Godsell	(United Kingdom) Ronald Shayes	6-3 6-1
1935	(United Kingdom) Frank Wilde	(United Kingdom) George Godsell	6-4 7-5
1936	(United Kingdom) George Godsell	(United States) John Burke Wilkinson	w.o.
1937	(Republic of China (1912–1949)) Kho Sin-Kie	(United Kingdom) Jimmy Jones	6-0 7-5
1938	(Republic of China (1912–1949)) Kho Sin-Kie	(United Kingdom) George Godsell	2-6 6-3 6-4
1939	(United Kingdom) Donald Butler	(United Kingdom) P. M. Lindner	6-0 6-3
1946	(United Kingdom) John K. Drinkall	(United Kingdom) Derrick F. Leyland	6-4 5-7 6-4
1947	(United Kingdom) Derrick F. Leyland	(United Kingdom) Richard Guise	5-7 6-3 7-5
1948	(United Kingdom) Norman Lewis	(United Kingdom) Richard Guise	10-8 6-2
1949	(United Kingdom) Arthur G. Roberts	(United Kingdom) Richard Guise	3-6 6-3 6-3
1950	(United Kingdom) Richard Guise	(United Kingdom) Arthur G. Roberts	6-4 6-1
1951	(Malaysia) Chew Bee Ong	(United Kingdom) Richard Guise	4-6 6-4 6-3
1952	(Australia) Peter Cawthorn	(Southern Rhodesia) Basil Katz	6-4 9-7
1953	(United Kingdom) John Horn	(Poland) Czesław Spychała	6-1 16-14
1954	(Australia) Dawson Hamilton	(Australia) Cedric Mason	3-6 7-5 6-4
1955	(United States) Malcolm Fox	(Australia) Cedric Mason	7-5 6-1
1956	(Australia) Louis Surville	(Australia) Arthur Marshall	6-0 6-3
1957	(South Africa) Derek Lawer	(South Africa) R. Lautenberg	6-1 7-5
1958	(United Kingdom) Alan Mills	(Brazil) Ivo Ribeiro	6-4 6-3
1959	(South Africa) Trevor Fancutt	(United Kingdom) Tony Pickard	6-3 6-2
1960	(United Kingdom) Robert Griffin	(United Kingdom) J. Guirdham	9-7 6-4
1961	(South Africa) Keith Diepraam	(South Africa) Robin Sanders	2-6 6-2 6-2
1962	(Brazil) José Edison Mandarino	(Brazil) Ron Barnes	10-8 7-5
1963	(Australia) Warren Jacques	(Australia) Alan Lane	6-3 7-5
1964	?, ?	?, ?	WEA
1965	(South Africa) Cliff Drysdale	(South Africa) Keith Diepraam	6-4 6-1
1966	(South Africa) Raymond Moore	(Australia) Dick Crealy	2-6 6-1 6-4
1969	(New Zealand) Brian Fairlie	(West Germany) Hans Joachim Plötz	6-4 6-3
