= James Baldwin (tennis) =

British tennis player

- Country (sports): GBR
- Born: 25 August 1858 Aitken's Gap Victoria, Australia
- Died: 17 July 1934 (age 78) Bath, Somersetshire, England
- Turned pro: 1884 (amateur tour)
- Retired: 1891

Singles
- Career record: 150–59
- Career titles: 16

Grand Slam singles results
- Wimbledon: 2R (1889)

James Baldwin (25 August 1858 – 21 July 1934) was British tennis player who competed at the Wimbledon Championships between 1889 and 1890. He was active from 1884 to 1891 and won 16 career singles titles.

== Career ==
James was born Aitken's Gap Victoria, Australia, on 25 August 1858. He played and won his first tournament at the Hayesland LTC Championship in Bath in 1884. He won the Tenby Open two times (1885–1886). He played and won his final singles title and tournament at the Burton-on-Trent Open in 1891.

== Family ==
James Baldwin married Adelaide Dunbar Yescombe, the daughter of the late Reverend Morris Yescombe and Mrs Yescombe [née Mary Jane Crosbie] in 1880 they had two sons and one daughter.
