= 1883 men's tennis season =

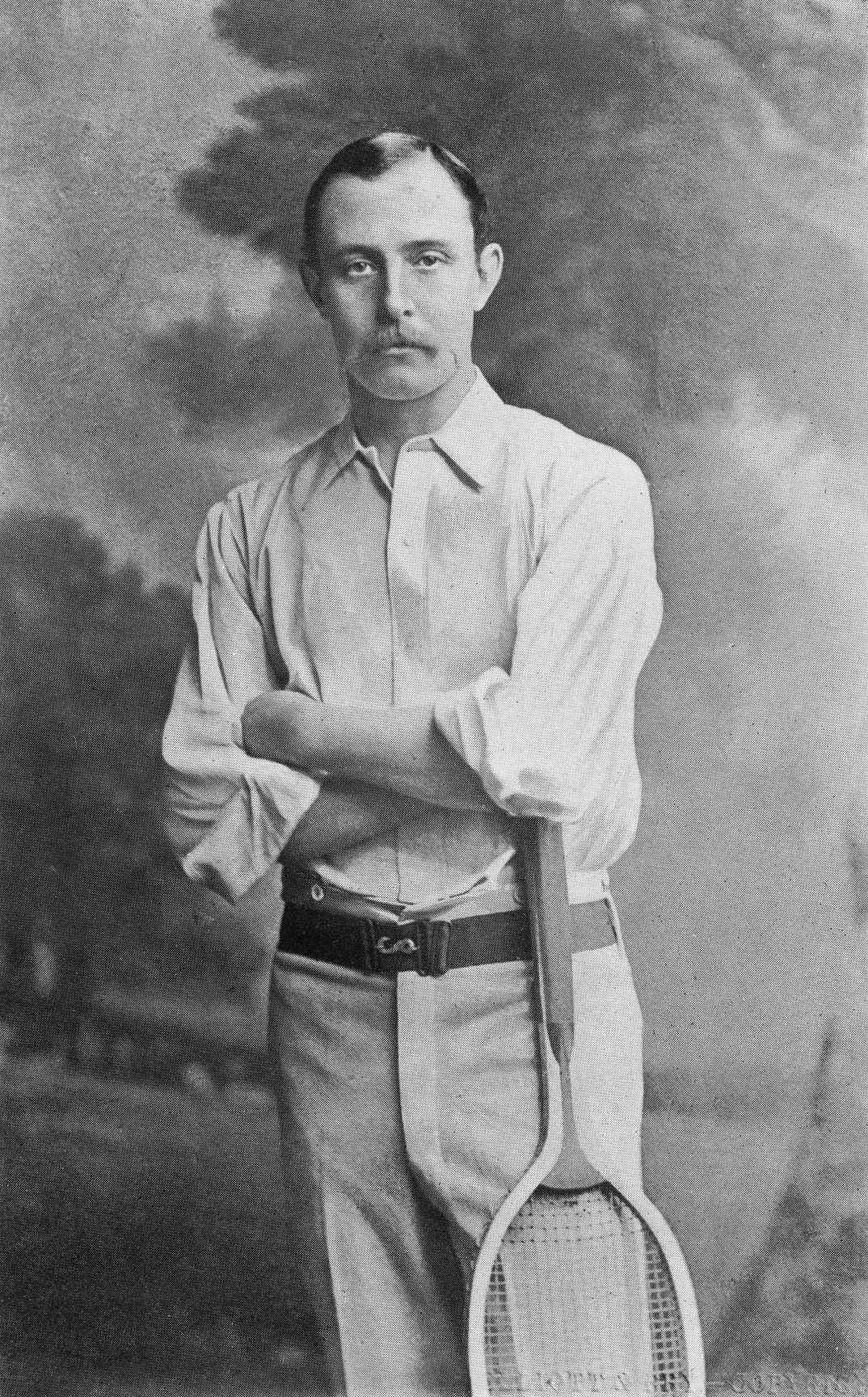
- Ernest Renshaw wins one of the four important tournaments of the year the Irish Championships

Details
- Duration: 24 April – 12 November
- Tournaments: 102 (Amateur)
- Categories: Important (5); National (4); Provincial/Regional/State (7); County (11); Local/Other (44)

Achievements (singles)
- Most titles: (United Kingdom) Charles Walder Grinstead (7) (United Kingdom) Herbert Wilberforce (7)
- Most finals: (United Kingdom) Charles Walder Grinstead (9)

The 1883 men's tennis season was the eighth annual tennis season, consisting of 102 tournaments. The Wimbledon Championships was won by William Renshaw for the third consecutive year, while Richard Sears continued his dominance at the U.S. National Championships also winning a third successive title. Other big winners this season were Ernest Renshaw, picking up the Irish Championships, Herbert Wilberforce winning the Northern Championships in Manchester, and Herbert Lawford collecting his second and final title at the Princes Club Championships.

The joint title leader this season was Charles Walder Grinstead winning 7 tournaments from 9 finals, Herbert Wilberforce won 7 events from 8 finals.

The season began in May in Dublin in Ireland and ended in November in Melbourne, Australia.

== Calendar ==
Notes 1: Challenge round: the final round of a tournament, in which the winner of a single-elimination phase faces the previous year's champion, who plays only that one match. The challenge round was used in the early history of tennis (from 1877 through 1921), in some tournaments not all.

* Indicates challenger

Notes 2:Tournaments in italics were events that were staged only once that season

Key

Important.
National
Provincial/State/Regional
County
Local

=== January to April ===
No event

=== May ===
Date	Tournament	Winner	Finalist	Semi finalist	Quarter finalist
7–13 May	Dublin University Championships; Dublin, Ireland; Outdoor; Hard (Asphalt); Singles - Doubles	(Ireland) Tom Campion; 5–7 6–1 7–5	(Ireland) Charles Henry Chaytor	(Ireland) Herbert Knox Mackay (Ireland) H. McDermott	(Ireland) David Wilson Christie (Ireland) Eyre Chatterton (Ireland) William R. A. Joynt (Ireland) J. E. L. Stein
13–14 May	Gloucestershire Championships; Cheltenham, Great Britain; Outdoor; Clay; Singles - Doubles	(United Kingdom) George M. Butterworth ?	(United Kingdom) G. J. Mitton	(United Kingdom) H. B. Porter (United Kingdom) James R. Tyers	(United Kingdom) William Salmon Bush (United Kingdom) A. H. Griffiths (United Kingdom) C. G. Newton (United Kingdom) G. J. Mitton
21–27 May	Irish Lawn Tennis Championships; Dublin, Ireland; Outdoor; Grass; Singles - Doubles	(United Kingdom) Ernest Renshaw; 3–6 6–3 7–5 1–6 6–3	(United Kingdom) Herbert Lawford	(Ireland) Ernest de Sylly H. Browne (Ireland) Eyre Chatterton	(Ireland) Peter Aungier (United Kingdom) G. F. Anson (Scotland) Herbert Lawford (United Kingdom) J. W. Wilson
21–27 May	West of England Championships; Bath, Great Britain; Outdoor; Grass; Singles - Doubles	(Ireland) Ernest de Sylly H. Browne; 6–3 6–2 6–3	(United Kingdom) Wilfred Milne	(United Kingdom) George M. Butterworth (United Kingdom) William C. Taylor	(United Kingdom) F. Field (United Kingdom) H. Nash (United Kingdom) Donald C. Stewart (United Kingdom) William C. Taylor
28 May–3 June	London Athletic Club Tournament; Fulham, London, Great Britain; Outdoor; Grass; Singles	(United Kingdom) Herbert Lawford; 6–1 4–6 6–2 6–3	(United Kingdom) Edward Lake Williams	(United Kingdom) Edgar Lubbock (United Kingdom) Herbert Chipp	(United Kingdom) Harry S. Barlow (United Kingdom) Herbert Chipp (United Kingdom) H. H. Green (United Kingdom) G. H. Taylor
28 May- 3 June	Longwood Cricket Club Tournament; Longwood Cup; Longwood Cricket Club, Chestnut Hill, Mass, United States; Outdoor; Grass; Singles - Doubles	(United States) Joseph Sill Clark Sr. 6–4 6–3 5–7 6–4	(United States) James Dwight	(United States) Richard D. Sears (United States) Joseph Sill Clark	(United States) G. W. Beales (United States) Clarence Clark (United States) James Dwight

=== June ===
Date	Tournament	Winner	Finalist	Semi finalist	Quarter finalist
June.	Oxford University Champion Tournament; Norham Gardens, Oxford, Great Britain; Grass; Singles – Doubles	(England) Robert Theodore Milford; 6-4 6-3 6-5	(United Kingdom) Herbert Carnegie Knox	(United Kingdom) Thomas Robinson Grey (United Kingdom) Champion Branfill Russell	(United Kingdom) Reginald Arthur Gamble (United Kingdom) Francis Regner Brooksbank Pinhorn (United Kingdom) Arthur Stanhope Rashleigh
4–9 Jun.	Gloucestershire Lawn Tennis Tournament; Montpellier Gardens; Cheltenham, Great Britain; Outdoor; Clay; Singles - Doubles	(United Kingdom) George Montague Butterworth; 6-2 6-1	(United Kingdom) George Jones Mitton	(United Kingdom) Henry Blane Porter (United Kingdom) James Rebotier Tyers	(United Kingdom) A.H. Griffiths (United Kingdom) C.G. Newton (United Kingdom) William John Bush-Salmon
4–10 June	East Gloucestershire Championships; Cheltenham, Great Britain; Outdoor; Grass; Singles - Doubles	(United Kingdom) Donald Charles Stewart; 6—0 6—1 6—0	(United Kingdom) William John Bush-Salmon		
6–8 June	Intercollegiate Championships; Hartford, Connecticut, United States; Outdoor; Grass; Singles - Doubles	(United States) Joseph Sill Clark Sr. 6—1 6—1	(United States) George Sargent		
11–16 June	Waterloo Tournament; Liverpool, Great Britain; Outdoor; Grass; Singles - Doubles	(United Kingdom) Bruce J. Ismay; 6—3 6—1	(United Kingdom) Gerald Barker	(United Kingdom) Gerald Barker (United Kingdom) J. W. Fowler	(United Kingdom) H. W. Hind (United Kingdom) R. H. Jones (United Kingdom) J. A. Rome
11–13 June.	Sussex County Lawn Tennis Club Spring Tournament; Hove Rink Tennis Club; Brighton, Great Britain; Outdoor; Asphalt; Singles - Doubles	(United Kingdom) Charles Walder Grinstead; 6-3, 5–7, 7–5, 1–6, 6-4	(United Kingdom) Donald Charles Stewart	(United Kingdom) Robert Howden Kellie	(United Kingdom) Hugh Vibart Workman-MacNaghten (United Kingdom) Leopold James (Leo) Maxse
13–16 June	South Wales Championships; Tenby, Wales; Outdoor; Grass; Singles - Doubles	(United Kingdom) Herbert Wilberforce; 6—2 6—1 6—1	(United Kingdom) P. T. Ashe		
18-24 June. (Note: The Leicester Lawn Tennis Club Tournament was founded in 1878 it staged its first tournament in 1880 called the Leicester Lawn Tennis Tournament. In 1883 it became an open tournament the Leicester Open Tennis Tournament for both men and women until 1938. The club also shared the staging of the Leicestershire County Championships with other venues.)	Leicester Lawn Tennis Club Tournament; Victoria Park; Leicester, Great Britain; Outdoor; Grass; Singles - Doubles	(United Kingdom) Charles Walder Grinstead; 4—6 6—3 6—2 6—1	(United Kingdom) Ernest Wool Lewis	(United Kingdom) Ernest Wool Lewis (United Kingdom) Francis William Monement	A. F. Cousins (United Kingdom) Alfred Sydney Noon (United Kingdom) Francis William Monement
18-24 June	Princes Club Championships; London, Great Britain; Outdoor; Grass; Singles - Doubles	(United Kingdom) Herbert Lawford; 6—2 6—0 6—1	(United Kingdom) William Taylor	(United Kingdom) Edward Lake Williams (United Kingdom) William Taylor	(United Kingdom) H. Blane (United Kingdom) Edgar Lubbock
21 - 26 June	Clifton Lawn Tennis Tournament; Clifton, Bristol, Great Britain; Outdoor; Grass; Singles - Doubles	(United Kingdom) George Butterworth; 6-3, 4-6, 6-2	(United Kingdom) Donald Charles Stewart		

=== July ===
Date	Tournament	Winner	Finalist	Semi finalist	Quarter finalist
July.	Inverkip Rovers Open; Castle Wemyss, Wemyss Bay, Scotland; Grass; Singles	(Scotland) George Arbuthnot Burns; 5-6, 3-6, 6-3, 6-5, 6-5	(Scotland) D.M. Hannay	(Scotland) J.C. Burns	(Scotland) H. Berwick (Scotland) J.P.A. Latham (Scotland) Walter Robert Baines Latham
July.	Inverkip Rovers Open; Castle Wemyss, Wemyss Bay, Scotland; Grass; Singles	Challenger (Scotland) Horatio Renaud Babington Peile		(Scotland) J.C. Burns	(Scotland) H. Berwick (Scotland) J.P.A. Latham (Scotland) Walter Robert Baines Latham
July.	Inverkip Rovers Open; Castle Wemyss, Wemyss Bay, Scotland; Grass; Singles	(Scotland) Horatio Renaud Babington Peile (Scotland) Miss Burns; 2 sets to 0	(England) W.G. Croft (Scotland) Mrs. Peile	(Scotland) J.C. Burns	(Scotland) H. Berwick (Scotland) J.P.A. Latham (Scotland) Walter Robert Baines Latham
July.	Berrylands Club Tournament; Berrylands LTC; Surbiton, Surrey, England; Outdoor; Grass; Singles	(United Kingdom) J.F. Newton; 5-6, 3-6, 6-1, 6-3, 6-3	(United Kingdom) Herbert Whalley Jellicoe		
23 June- 1 July	Northern Championships; Manchester, Great Britain; Outdoor; Grass; Singles - Doubles	(United Kingdom) Herbert Wilberforce; 6—1 3—6 6—1 6—0	(United Kingdom) Champion Branfill Russell	(United Kingdom) John Hartley (United Kingdom) John Ravenscroft	(Ireland) Peter Aungier (United Kingdom) A. L. Payne (United Kingdom) John Ravenscroft (United Kingdom) Edward Lake Williams
2 - 5 July.	Edinburgh University LTC Open; Edinburgh University Lawn Tennis Club; Edinburgh, Scotland; Grass; Singles - Doubles	(Scotland) John Galbraith Horn; 3 sets to 1	(England) Arthur Walton Fuller	(Scotland) Archibald Thomson	
3–9 July.	Leamington Open Tournament; Leamington Spa, Warwickshire, England, Outdoor; Grass; Singles – Doubles	(United Kingdom) Charles Walder Grinstead; 8-6, 3-6, 6-3, 3-6, 6-3	(United Kingdom) Herbert Wilberforce	(United Kingdom) Donald Charles Stewart	(United Kingdom) Sidney Alfred Noon (United Kingdom) J.W. Stubbs (United Kingdom) Charles Lacy Sweet
3–9 July.	Warwickshire Championships; Leamington Spa, Warwickshire, England, Outdoor; Grass; Singles – Doubles	(United Kingdom) John Redfern Deykin; 6-2, 6-2, 6-4	(United Kingdom) James Powell	(United Kingdom) John Charles Kay	(United Kingdom) A.H. Griffiths (United Kingdom) J.H. Mitchell (United Kingdom) F. Shapley
13-14 July.	Portishead Open Lawn Tennis Tournament; Portishead, Somerset, England; Outdoor; Grass; Singles - Doubles	(United Kingdom) Charles Lacy Sweet; 6-2. 6-0	(United Kingdom) Lionel Wilberforce	(United Kingdom) Norman Goodford Cholmeley	(United Kingdom) F.E. Gibbs (United Kingdom) Alfred William Moore Weatherly (United Kingdom) William Parkfield Wethered
7–16 July	Wimbledon Championships; London, Great Britain; Outdoor; Grass; Singles - Doubles	(United Kingdom) William Renshaw; 2–6 6–3 6–3 4–6 6–3	(United Kingdom) Donald C. Stewart	(United Kingdom) Ernest Renshaw (United Kingdom) W. C. Taylor	(United Kingdom) Marmaduke S. Constable (United Kingdom) Charles Walder Grinstead (United Kingdom) Herbert Wilberforce
7–16 July	Wimbledon Championships; London, Great Britain; Outdoor; Grass; Singles - Doubles	Challenger (United Kingdom) Ernest Renshaw		(United Kingdom) Ernest Renshaw (United Kingdom) W. C. Taylor	(United Kingdom) Marmaduke S. Constable (United Kingdom) Charles Walder Grinstead (United Kingdom) Herbert Wilberforce
17-21 July	Scottish Championships; Edinburgh, Great Britain; Outdoor; Wood (i); Singles - Doubles	(Scotland) John Galbraith Horn; 6–4 6–5 1–6 6–2	(Scotland) E. M. Shand	(United Kingdom) A. L. Davidson (Scotland) E. M. Shand	(United Kingdom) Dr Walter William Chamberlain (United Kingdom) A.H. Douglas (Ireland) Frederick William Knox
17-21 July	Scottish Championships; Edinburgh, Great Britain; Outdoor; Wood (i); Singles - Doubles	Challenger (United Kingdom) Arthur Walton Fuller		(United Kingdom) A. L. Davidson (Scotland) E. M. Shand	(United Kingdom) Dr Walter William Chamberlain (United Kingdom) A.H. Douglas (Ireland) Frederick William Knox
20- 21 July.	Gore Court Championships; Sittingbourne, Gore Court Archery and LTC; Gore Court, Sittingbourne, Great Britain; Outdoor; Grass; Singles	(United Kingdom) Rev. F. Greenfield; 2 sets to 0	(United Kingdom) Robert Henry Whitcombe	(United Kingdom) C. Lake (United Kingdom) H. Winch	(United Kingdom) E. Carpenter (United Kingdom) C. Fooks (Portugal) V. Henriquez (United Kingdom) J.B. Townsend
20–21 July. (Note: The Staffordshire Tournament was staged from 1879 to 1890.)	Staffordshire County Cricket Club Lawn Tennis Tournament. Lichfield, England; Outdoor; Grass; Singles	(England) Sidney Alfred Noon; 2-6, 6–4, 6-2	(England) Walter William Chamberlain	(England) John Redfern Deykin	(England) Francis R. B.Pinhorn (United Kingdom) R. Stuart Wilson
16-22 July	Redhill Open; Redhill, Surrey, Great Britain; Outdoor; Grass; Singles - Doubles	(United Kingdom) Leopold James (Leo) Maxse; 3–6 6–4 6–4	(United Kingdom) Herbert Chipp	(United Kingdom) William John Down	(United Kingdom) F. E. Cole (United Kingdom) Harold S. Stone (United Kingdom) Leopold James (Leo) Maxse
24 July	County Kildare Tournament; Naas, Ireland; Grass; Singles - Doubles	(Ireland) Peter Aungier; 6-0, 6–3, 6-2	(Ireland) Algernon A. M. Aylmer		
18-26 July	Northumberland Championships; Newcastle upon Tyne, Great Britain; Outdoor; Grass; Singles - Doubles	(United Kingdom) Mark Fenwick ?	(United Kingdom) Minden Fenwick		
26 – 27 July. (Note: The Derbyshire Championships was originally staged at the Buxton Gardens from 1883. It was an open tournament with ladies and gentlemen's singles played under the title 'Championship of Derbyshire'.)	Derbyshire Championships; Buxton Gardens; Buxton, England; Grass; Singles – Doubles	(New Zealand) Minden Fenwick; 6-2, 6-3	(England) Robert Parsons Earwaker	(United Kingdom) G.A. Bolt	(United Kingdom) Percival Clennell Fenwick (United Kingdom) R.C. Hamilton (United Kingdom) H. Matthe
18 – 28 July.	North Berkshire ALTC Tournament; Abingdon, North Berkshire, England; Outdoor; Grass; Singles - Doubles	(United Kingdom) H.W. Marshall; 2 sets to 1	(United Kingdom) William McLaren	(United Kingdom) T.E. Graham	(United Kingdom) J.H. Deazeley (United Kingdom) Captain Preston
18 – 28 July.	North Berkshire ALTC Tournament; Abingdon, North Berkshire, England; Outdoor; Grass; Singles - Doubles	(United Kingdom) William McLaren (United Kingdom) Captain Preston; 2 sets to 0	(United Kingdom) Mr. Gosse (United Kingdom) Mr. G. McLaren	(United Kingdom) T.E. Graham	(United Kingdom) J.H. Deazeley (United Kingdom) Captain Preston
24-28 July	Limerick CC Lawn Tennis Tournament; Limerick, Ireland; Outdoor; Grass; Singles - Doubles	(Ireland) Ernest de Sylly Browne; 6–3 6–2 6–5	(Ireland) Charles R. B. Heaton-Armstrong; 6–2 9–7	(Ireland) F. G. Kennedy (Ireland) Charles R. B. Heaton-Armstrong	(Ireland) R. Browne (Ireland) F. G. Kennedy (Ireland) A. W. Shaw
24-28 July	Limerick CC Lawn Tennis Tournament; Limerick, Ireland; Outdoor; Grass; Singles - Doubles	Challenger (Ireland) William Dawson		(Ireland) F. G. Kennedy (Ireland) Charles R. B. Heaton-Armstrong	(Ireland) R. Browne (Ireland) F. G. Kennedy (Ireland) A. W. Shaw
23–29 July	Essex Championships; Brentwood, Great Britain; Outdoor; Grass; Singles - Doubles	(United Kingdom) Charles Walder Grinstead; 6–1 6–3 6–4	(United Kingdom) P. Colley	(United Kingdom) Geoffrey Fowell Buxton (United Kingdom) R. C. Ball	(United Kingdom) Edward North Buxton (United Kingdom) P.M. Evans (United Kingdom) F. W. Freeman (United Kingdom) H.E. Solly
23–29 July.	South of Ireland Championships (Limerick Cup); Limerick Cricket Club; Limerick, Ireland; Outdoor; Grass; Singles	(Ireland) Eyre Chatterton; 6–1 6–0 6–0	(Ireland) Albert E. Browning ?	(Ireland) H. Evelyn (Ireland) William H. Gavin	(Ireland) J. Bagott (Ireland) William Dawson (Ireland) H. Leighton (United Kingdom) J. Butler Robinson
23–29 July.	South of Ireland Championships (Limerick Cup); Limerick Cricket Club; Limerick, Ireland; Outdoor; Grass; Singles	Challenger (Ireland) Edward Montiford Longfield Lysaght		(Ireland) H. Evelyn (Ireland) William H. Gavin	(Ireland) J. Bagott (Ireland) William Dawson (Ireland) H. Leighton (United Kingdom) J. Butler Robinson
23-29 July	London Athletic Club Tournament, London Athletic Club, Fulham, London, Great Britain; Outdoor; Grass; Singles	(United Kingdom) M. S. Constable; 3–6 6–1 6–2 3–6 6–2	(United Kingdom) Arthur Hallward	(United Kingdom) Arthur Hallward (United Kingdom) H. H. Playford	(United Kingdom) Stewart Bathurst (United Kingdom) A. Medley (United Kingdom) H. H. Playford
24–29 July	Norwich Open Lawn Tennis Tournament; Norwich, Great Britain; Outdoor; Grass; Singles - Doubles	(United Kingdom) Francis William Monement; 6–2 6–5	(United Kingdom) William Bolding Monement	(United Kingdom) Walter Edward Hansell (United Kingdom) William Bolding Monement	(United Kingdom) Henry Chartres Biron (United Kingdom) J.H. Gwillim (United Kingdom) Walter Edward Hansell

=== August ===
Date	Tournament	Winner	Finalist	Semi finalist	Quarter finalist
August. (Note: The Maidstone tournament was staged from 1881 to 1897.)	Maidstone Tournament; Maidstone Athletic Ground; Maidstone, England; Outdoor; Grass; Singles	(United Kingdom) Randall Mercer; 6-3, 6-5, 6-4		(United Kingdom) Harold Sweetenham	
31 July–2 August.	Cirencester Park Lawn Tennis Tournament; Earl Bathurst Estate; Cirencester Park; Cirencester, Gloucestershire, England; Outdoor; Grass; Singles - Doubles	(United Kingdom) Charles Lacy Sweet; 6-0, 6–4, 7-5	(United Kingdom) Pelham George von Donop		
3-4 August.	Worcestershire County Cricket Club Open; Boughton Cricket Ground; Worcester, Worcestershire, England. Outdoor; Grass; Singles	(United Kingdom) John Redfern Deykin; 2-6 6-3 6-3	(United Kingdom) Walter William Chamberlain	(United Kingdom) A. Fuller (United Kingdom) Hugh Vibart MacNaghten	(United Kingdom) George Reston Brewerton (United Kingdom) George Jones Mitton (United Kingdom) W. Green Price
3–7 August.	Leamington Open Tournament; Leamington LTC; Leamington Spa, England; Outdoor; Grass; Singles - Doubles -	(United Kingdom) Robert Braddell; 7-5, 6-2, 6-3	(United Kingdom) Teddy Williams	(United Kingdom) William H. Rawlinson	(England) John Redfern Deykin (England) John Charles Kay (England) Henry Blane Porter
3–7 August.	Warwickshire Championships; Jephson's Gardens; Leamington Spa, Great Britain; Outdoor; Grass; Singles - Doubles -	(United Kingdom) John Redfern Deykin; 6-2, 6-2, 6-4	(United Kingdom) James Powell	(United Kingdom) John Charles Kay	(United Kingdom) A.H. Griffiths (United Kingdom) J.H. Mitchell (United Kingdom) F. Shapley
6–8 August.	West Somerset Archery and Lawn Tennis Tournament; West Somerset Lawn Tennis Club; Taunton, Somerset, England; Outdoor; Grass	(United Kingdom) Francis Escott Hancock; 6-3 6-2	(United Kingdom) Harold Lewis Vaughan	(United Kingdom) Rev. G. Thomson	(United Kingdom) C.R. Rodwell (United Kingdom) R.P. Spurway
6–8 August.	Darlington Association Tournament; Darlington, Great Britain; Outdoor; Grass; Singles	(England) Herbert Wilberforce; 6-1, 6–0, 6-3	(England) Norman Leslie Hallward	(England) John Redfern Deykin (England) Marmaduke Strickland Constable	(United Kingdom) C.E. Maly (United Kingdom) C. Sorby
6–11 Aug.	Langley Marish Tournament; Eaton Recreation Ground; Langley Marish, Berkshire, England; Grass	(England) Felix Henry Prince Palmer; 6-2, 6-2	(England) Wiliam Harry Nash	(England) Francis Reginald Nash	(England) Zachary Hubert Nash (United Kingdom) C.O. Phipps (United Kingdom) Offley Scoones
6–11 August.	Waterford Annual Lawn Tennis Tournament; Waterford, Cricket Club, Waterford, Ireland; Outdoor; Grass; Singles	(United Kingdom) George M. Butterworth; 3-6, 8–6, 6-1	(Ireland) Frederick William Knox; 6-0 6-3	(Ireland) Alexander Kaye Butterworth	(Ireland) John M. Brown (England) Captain George Culley Stobart
14 August.	Exmouth LTC Tournament; Exmouth, Great Britain; Singles - Doubles	(United Kingdom) Charles Walder Grinstead; 6—2 6—5 6—4	(United Kingdom) Teddy Williams		
13 - 17 Aug.	East Grinstead Lawn Tennis Club Tournament; East Grinstead Lawn Tennis & Croquet Club; East Grinstead, England; Grass; Singles - Doubles	(United Kingdom of Great Britain and Ireland) William Nevill Cobbold; 6–3, 6-5	(United Kingdom of Great Britain and Ireland) James David Vans Agnew		
18–23 August.	South Wales Championships; Tenby LTC; Tenby, Carmarthenshire, Wales; Outdoor; Grass; Singles	(United Kingdom) Herbert Wilberforce; 6-2, 6–1, 6-1	(United Kingdom) P.T. Ashe	(Wales) George Bevan Bowen (Wales) Grismond Saunders Davies	(Wales) E.W. Evans (Wales) Cecil Gough (Wales) William Sidney Nelson Heard (Wales) Gethin Meredith
20–23 August.	Teignmouth and Shaldon Tournament; Teignmouth, Great Britain; Outdoor; Asphalt; Singles	(United Kingdom) Arthur John Stanley; 6-5, 6–5, 0–6, 6-1	(England) Erskine Gerald Watson	(England) J.C. Rogers; 5-6, 6–2, 6-2 (United Kingdom) Edward Charles Pine-Coffin	(United Kingdom) R.H.S. Barnes (United Kingdom) K.D. Erskine (United Kingdom) Francis Seymour (Frank) Noon (United Kingdom) Henry Blane Porter
21-23 August.	Holt Lawn Tennis Club Tournament; Holt LTC; Holt, Norfolk, England; Outdoor; Grass; Singles - Doubles	(England) Charles Edmund Tatham; 6-1, 2-6, 6-1	(United Kingdom) William Bolding Monement	(United Kingdom) G.E. Preston	(United Kingdom) Francis William Monement (United Kingdom) H. Rogers
21 – 24 August.	King's County and Ormonde Tournament; Parsons Town, King's County, Ireland, Ireland; Grass; Singles - Doubles	(Ireland) Eyre Chatterton; 6-3, 6-2, 6-3	(Ireland) Reverend P. Knox		
24 August	U.S. National Championships; Newport, United States; Singles - Doubles	(United States) Richard Sears; 6—2 6—0 9—7	(United States) James Dwight		
24 August	U.S. National Championships; Newport, United States; Singles - Doubles	(United States) Richard Sears (United States) James Dwight; 6—0, 6–2, 6—2	(United States) Alexander Van Rensselaer (United States) Arthur Newbold		
21 - 25 August.	Penzance Open; Penzance LTC; Penzance, Cornwall, England; Outdoor; Grass; Singles - Doubles	(United Kingdom) Arthur Stanhope Rashleigh; 6-2, 6-3	(Ireland) P.C. Smith	(United Kingdom) N. Harvey	(United Kingdom) H.E. Chappel (United Kingdom) Lancelot Melvill Haslope
21 - 25 August.	Penzance Open; Penzance LTC; Penzance, Cornwall, England; Outdoor; Grass; Singles - Doubles	(United Kingdom) T.H. Cornish (United Kingdom) Miss. Childs; 6-5, 2-6, 6-4	(United Kingdom) Mr. Arathoon (United Kingdom) Miss Marland.	(United Kingdom) N. Harvey	(United Kingdom) H.E. Chappel (United Kingdom) Lancelot Melvill Haslope
21 – 25 August. (Note: The South of Scotland Championships were staged from 1882 to 1967.)	South of Scotland Championships; Beechgrove Grounds; Moffat, Scotland; Grass; Singles – Doubles	(United Kingdom) Percival Clennell Fenwick; 6-2, 6–2, 8-6	(Scotland) Archibald Thomson	(Scotland) Charles Robert Andrew Howden	(United Kingdom) William Ferguson (United Kingdom) Alfred Gordon Rae
22 – 25 August.	Edgbaston Open Tournament; Edgbaston, England; Outdoor; Grass; Singles	(United Kingdom of Great Britain and Ireland) Charles Walder Grinstead; 6-3, 6-3	(United Kingdom of Great Britain and Ireland) Edward Lake Williams	(United Kingdom) Donald Charles Stewart; 3-6, 8–6, 6-4	(England) John Redfern Deykin (England) Charles Gathorne Edmund Orr (United Kingdom) F. Durant
29 August.	Gore Court Championships (2nd); Sittingbourne, Gore Court Archery and LTC; Gore Court, Sittingbourne, Great Britain; Outdoor; Grass; Singles	(United Kingdom) H.S. Cooper; 2 sets to 1	(United Kingdom) Rev. F. Greenfield	(United Kingdom) L. Tuke	(United Kingdom) R.W. Garraway (Germany) Mr. Schönberg
29 August.	Maidenhead Lawn Tennis Tournament; Maidenhead Cricket Field; Maidenhead, England; Outdoor; Grass; Singles	(United Kingdom) E.L. Bainbridge ?	(United Kingdom) W.H. Miller		
30–31 August.	North Wales Counties Challenge Cup; Vale of Clwyd LTC; Denbigh, Vale of Clwyd, Wales; Outdoor; Grass; Singles	(England) Arthur Bennett Mesham; 6-0 6-3	(United Kingdom) Major Mesham	(Wales) J.R. Wynne Edwards	(Wales) Thomas Alured Wynne Edwards (Wales) J.P. Lewis (United Kingdom) A.H. Turnour

=== September ===
Date	Tournament	Winner	Finalist	Semi finalist	Quarter finalist
September. (Note: The Swanage Tennis Tournament was established in 1883 and was staged until at least 1979 according to sources, there is no complete roll of tournament winners.)	Swanage LTC Tournament; Swanage, Great Britain; Outdoor; Surface ? Singles - Doubles	(United Kingdom) Eustace Fiennes; 6-2, 6-1	(United Kingdom) A.H. Robinson		
September. (Note: The Framlingham Tennis Tournament was established in 1883 and first staged at Hurts Hall. It was staged on the men's tour till 1981. The tournament is still being staged today. The Saxmundham Tennis Tournament was also staged at the same location in 1883 but are distinct events. By 1903 the event was staged in the first two weeks of August and has not changed since.)	Framlingham Open Lawn Tennis Tournament; Hurts Hill Courts; Hurts Hill Park, Saxmundham, England; Grass; Singles – Doubles	(United Kingdom) Francis William Monement (United Kingdom) William Bolding Monement shared title			
28 August–1 September	Canadian Championships; Toronto, Canada; Outdoor; Grass; Singles	(United States) Charles H. Farnum; 6–3, 6–3, 0–6, 6–0	(Canada) Charles Smith Hyman	(Canada) Harry D. Gamble (Canada) Isidore F. Hellmuth	(Canada) Henry R. Elmsley (Ireland) FitzJames Hynes (Canada) G.H. Meyer (Canada) Andrew E. Plummer
29 Aug–1 Sep.	Devon and Cornwall Archery Society Lawn Tennis Tournament; Manadon, Plymouth, England; Grass; Singles - Doubles	(United Kingdom of Great Britain and Ireland) P.C. Smith; 6-0 6-3	(United Kingdom of Great Britain and Ireland) F. Bero	(United Kingdom of Great Britain and Ireland) F. Boulton	(United Kingdom of Great Britain and Ireland) T.H. Gill (United Kingdom of Great Britain and Ireland) Albert Cecil Hill (United Kingdom of Great Britain and Ireland) A. Soltau-Symons
4–8 Sep	West Teviotdale Open; Hawick Cricket Ground; Hawick, Teviotdale, Roxburghshire, Scotland; Grass; Singles - Doubles	(Scotland) Alfred Aitken Thomson; 6-1, 6-2	(Scotland) George Nelson Stenhouse	(Scotland) Joseph Constable Maxwell-Scott	(United Kingdom) E.M. Inglis (Scotland) Forrester John Thomson
4–8 Sep	West Teviotdale Open; Hawick Cricket Ground; Hawick, Teviotdale, Roxburghshire, Scotland; Grass; Singles - Doubles	(Scotland) Alfred Aitken Thomson (Scotland) Forrester John Thomson; 6-3, 6-5, 6-2	(Scotland) Joseph Constable Maxwell-Scott (Scotland) Charles S. Constable Maxwell-Stuart	(Scotland) Joseph Constable Maxwell-Scott	(United Kingdom) E.M. Inglis (Scotland) Forrester John Thomson
4–8 Sep	West Teviotdale Open; Hawick Cricket Ground; Hawick, Teviotdale, Roxburghshire, Scotland; Grass; Singles - Doubles	(United Kingdom) James Locke (Scotland) Miss Stuart; 6-2 6-3	(Scotland) C.E. Stewart (United Kingdom) Miss Cliff	(Scotland) Joseph Constable Maxwell-Scott	(United Kingdom) E.M. Inglis (Scotland) Forrester John Thomson
4-9 September.	Lenox Invitation; Lenox Lawn Tennis Club; Harlem, New York, United States; Outdoor; Grass; Singles - Doubles	(United States) Alexander Van Rensselaer; 6-2 0-6 6-4 8-6	(United States) Harry Farnum	(United States) G.W. Beals (United States) Arthur Emden Newbold	(United States) Walter Van Rensselaer Berry (United States) G. Higginson (United States) J.H. Powell
10–12 September	Downshire Lawn Tennis Tournament; Downshire Archery and Lawn Tennis Club; Cliftonville Cricket Club Ground, Belfast, Great Britain; Outdoor; Grass	(United Kingdom) A.M. Inglis; 6-2 6-0	(United Kingdom) G. Macan	(United Kingdom) L. Bristow	(United Kingdom) R.J. McNeill (Ireland) Robert Baron Templer
12 - 14 September.	Saxmundham Lawn Tennis Tournament; Saxmundham Lawn Tennis Club; Hurts Hill Park, Saxmundham, England; Grass; Singles – Doubles	(United Kingdom) William Bolding Monement; 6-1, 6-1	(United Kingdom) M. Wilkinson	(United Kingdom) Francis William Monement (United Kingdom) Maurice Welldon	(United Kingdom) W.F. Adams (United Kingdom) Arthur Lloyd Hansell
3 September	South of England Championships; Eastbourne, England; Singles - Doubles	(United Kingdom) Teddy Williams; 6-1, 8–6, 4–6, 7-5	(United Kingdom) Charles Walder Grinstead		

=== October ===
Date	Tournament	Winner	Finalist	Semi finalist	Quarter finalist
October.	St. George's Cricket Club Tournament; St George's Cricket Club; Hoboken. New York, United States; Outdoor; Grass; Singles - Doubles	(United States) Clarence Clark; 6-0, 6–4, 8-6	(United States) William Edward Glyn	(United States) William Edward Glyn bye (United States) Carroll J. Post Jr.	(United States) W.P. Anderson (United States) Harry Farnum (United States) G.W. Green
5 October.	Brighton Lawn Tennis Club Tournament; Brighton Lawn Tennis Club; Queen's Park, Brighton, East Sussex, England; Grass	(United Kingdom) A.O. Jennings; 6-2, 6–1, 6-1	(England) Leonard Dampier	(United Kingdom) H. Langton	
6 October.	Armagh Lawn Tennis Club Tournament; Mr. Bourkes court Ballinshone, Northern Ireland; Outdoor ? Singles - Doubles	(Ireland) Robert Shaw Templer; 2-1 in sets	(Ireland) E. J. Wolfe	(Ireland) Robert Baron Templer	
11 October	Intercollegiate Fall Championships; Hartford, United States; Singles - Doubles	(United States) Howard Augustus Taylor; 2—6 6—2 6—4 6—0	(United States) William V.S. Thorne		
26-27 October.	Fall Open Tournament Far and Near LTC; Hastings-on-the-Hudson, NY, United States; Grass; Singles - Doubles	(United States) Richard Field Conover; 6-1, 6-4	(United States) Alexander Van Rensselaer		

=== November ===
Date	Tournament	Winner	Finalist	Semi finalist	Quarter finalist
27 November	Victorian Championships; Melbourne, Australia; Singles - Doubles	(Australia) Louis Whyte; 6—5 6—4 6—3	(Australia) Walter John Carre Riddell		

=== December ===
No Events

== Tournament winners ==
Note: important tournaments in bold

Name	Tournaments	Total
(United Kingdom) Charles Walder Grinstead	East Grinstead, Brentwood, Brighton, Exmouth, Leicester, Lemington	5
(Ireland) Ernest Browne	Bath, Limerick	2
(United States) Joseph Sill Clark	Hartford, Chestnut Hill	2
(United Kingdom) Herbert Wilberforce	Tenby, **Northern Championships**	2
(United Kingdom) Herbert Lawford	**Prince's Club Championships**	1
(United Kingdom) Ernest Renshaw	**Irish Championships**	1
(United Kingdom) William Renshaw	**Wimbledon Championships**	1
(United States) Richard Sears	**US National Championships**	1
(United Kingdom) Donald Charles Stewart	Cheltenham	1
(Ireland) Eyre Chatterton	Limerick	1
(United Kingdom) Francis William Monement	Norwich	1
(United Kingdom) George M. Butterworth	Bath	1
(United States) Howard Augustus Taylor	Newport RI	1
(United States) Richard Field Conover	Hastings-on-Hudson	1
(Scotland) John Galbraith Horn	Edinburgh	1
(United Kingdom) Leopold Maxse	Redhill	1
(Australia) Louis Whyte	Melbourne	1
(United Kingdom) M. S. Constable	London	1
(United Kingdom) Teddy Williams	Eastbourne	1
(Ireland) Tom Campion	Dublin	1

== Sources ==
- Ayre's Lawn Tennis Almanack And Tournament Guide, 1908 to 1938, A. Wallis Myers.
- British Lawn Tennis and Squash Magazine, 1948 to 1967, British Lawn Tennis Ltd, UK.
- Dunlop Lawn Tennis Almanack And Tournament Guide, G.P. Hughes, 1939 to 1958, Dunlop Sports Co. Ltd, UK
- Lawn tennis and Badminton Magazine, 1906 to 1973, UK.
- Lowe's Lawn Tennis Annuals and Compendia, Lowe, Sir F. Gordon, Eyre & Spottiswoode
- Spalding's Lawn Tennis Annuals from 1885 to 1922, American Sports Pub. Co, USA.
- Sports Around the World: History, Culture, and Practice, Nauright John and Parrish Charles, (2012), ABC-CLIO, Santa Barbara, Cal, US, ISBN 1598843001.
- Mazak, Karoly (2017). The Concise History of Tennis (8 ed.). Independently published. ISBN 9781549746475.
- Gillmeister, Heiner (1998). Tennis: A Cultural History (1st Paperback ed.). NYU Press. ISBN 9780814731215.
- The Tennis Book, edited by Michael Bartlett and Bob Gillen, Arbor House, New York, 1981 ISBN 0-87795-344-9
- The World of Tennis Annuals, Barrett John, 1970 to 2001.
- Total Tennis:The Ultimate Tennis Encyclopedia, by Bud Collins, Sport Classic Books, Toronto, Canada, ISBN 0-9731443-4-3
- Wright & Ditson Officially Adopted Lawn Tennis Guide's 1890 to 1920 Wright & Ditsons Publishers, Boston, Mass, USA.
- http://www.tennisarchives.com/Tournaments 1883
- https://app.thetennisbase.com/1883 Men's Tennis season
- Tornei di tennis maschili nel 1883
