= 1882 Wimbledon Championship – Singles =

Singles
- 1882 Wimbledon Championship

Final
- Champion: (United Kingdom) William Renshaw
- Runner-up: (United Kingdom) Ernest Renshaw
- Score: 6–1, 2–6, 4–6, 6–2, 6–2

Details
- Draw: 28
- Seeds: –

Events
Singles
← 1881 ·	Wimbledon Championship	· 1883 →

Ernest Renshaw defeated Richard Richardson 6–5, 6–3, 2–6, 6–3 in the All Comers' Final, but the reigning champion William Renshaw defeated Ernest Renshaw 6–1, 2–6, 4–6, 6–2, 6–2 in the challenge round to win the gentlemen's singles tennis title at the 1882 Wimbledon Championships.

== Draw ==
=== Key ===
- Q = Qualifier
- WC = Wild card
- LL = Lucky loser
- Alt = Alternate
- SE = Special exempt
- PR = Protected ranking
- ITF = ITF entry
- JE = Junior exempt
- w/o = Walkover
- r = Retired
- d = Defaulted
- SR = Special ranking

=== Challenge round ===
Challenge Round
(United Kingdom) Ernest Renshaw	1	6	6	2	2
(United Kingdom) William Renshaw	6	2	4	6	6

=== All comers' finals ===
Semifinals
(United Kingdom) Ernest Renshaw	6	4	6	3	6
(United Kingdom) Herbert Lawford	4	6	2	6	0
(United Kingdom) Richard Richardson	6	6	6
(United Kingdom) Frank Benson	1	2	1

Final
(United Kingdom) Ernest Renshaw	7	6	2	6
(United Kingdom) Richard Richardson	5	3	6	3

=== Top half ===
First round
(United Kingdom) Ernest Browne	6	6	6
(United Kingdom) Claude Farrer	0	2	0
(United Kingdom) Ernest Renshaw	6	6	6
(United Kingdom) William Tatham	0	1	1
(United Kingdom) PG von Donop	6	4	6	6
(United Kingdom) George Montgomerie	3	6	3	2
(United Kingdom) Humphrey Berkeley	4	4	6	6	6
(United Kingdom) George Arbuthnot	6	6	3	2	4
(United Kingdom) Herbert Chipp	6	1	6	0	2
(United Kingdom) Arthur Stanley	4	6	5	6	6
(United Kingdom) Herbert Lawford	6	6	6
(United Kingdom) B Follett	4	2	3
(United Kingdom) Herbert Wilberforce	6	6	6
(United Kingdom) HF Wilkes	5	5	3
(United Kingdom) JC Maxwell-Scott	w/o
(United Kingdom) R Hyde Clarke

Second round
(United Kingdom) E Browne	1	5	6	6	5
(United Kingdom) E Renshaw	6	6	1	4	6
(United Kingdom) PG von Donop	w/o
(United Kingdom) H Berkeley
(United Kingdom) A Stanley	1	2	3
(United Kingdom) H Lawford	6	6	6
(United Kingdom) H Wilberforce	6	6	6
(United Kingdom) R Hyde Clarke	4	2	1

Quarterfinals
(United Kingdom) E Renshaw	6	6	6
(United Kingdom) H Berkeley	5	1	4
(United Kingdom) H Lawford	6	6	6
(United Kingdom) H Wilberforce	2	5	5

Semifinals
(United Kingdom) E Renshaw	6	4	6	3	6
(United Kingdom) H Lawford	4	6	2	6	0

=== Bottom half ===
First round
(United Kingdom) FA Fairlie	3	6	6	6
(United Kingdom) Wilfred Milne	6	4	2	2
(United Kingdom) Otway Woodhouse	6	6	6
(United Kingdom) FJ Ridgway	3	1	4
(United Kingdom) George Butterworth	5	6	5	6	6
(United Kingdom) Harry Grove	6	3	6	2	0
(United Kingdom) Richard Richardson	6	6	6
(United Kingdom) Donald Stewart	0	2	0
(United Kingdom) Galbraith Horn	6	6	6
(United Kingdom) CJ Michod	2	3	4
(United Kingdom) Francis Govett	5	3	4
(United Kingdom) Frank Benson	6	6	6

Second round
(United Kingdom) FA Fairlie	5	5	3
(United Kingdom) O Woodhouse	6	6	6
(United Kingdom) G Butterworth	1	5	3
(United Kingdom) R Richardson	6	6	6
(United Kingdom) G Horn	3	6	5	6	5
(United Kingdom) F Benson	6	1	6	3	6

Quarterfinals
(United Kingdom) O Woodhouse	1	0	2
(United Kingdom) R Richardson	6	6	6
(United Kingdom) F Benson
bye

Semifinals
(United Kingdom) R Richardson	6	6	6
(United Kingdom) F Benson	1	2	1

Preceded by 1881 U.S. National Championship – Singles	Grand Slam men's singles	Succeeded by 1882 U.S. National Championships – Singles
