= William Taylor (tennis) =

English tennis player

- Full name: William C Taylor
- Country (sports): United Kingdom
- Born: c. 1860 London, England
- Died: Unknown
- Turned pro: 1880 (amateur tour)
- Retired: 1908

Singles
- Career record: 106–87
- Career titles: 3

Grand Slam singles results
- Wimbledon: SF (1883, 1888)

Doubles

Grand Slam doubles results
- Wimbledon: SF (1885)

William C Taylor (1860 – ?) was an English tennis player of the late 19th century. He was a two-time semifinalist in singles at the Wimbledon Championships, in 1883 and 1888. He was active between 1880 and 1908, played close to 200 matches, and contested 10 career singles finals, winning 3 titles.

== Career ==
Taylor played his first tournament in late June 1880 at the Prince's Club Championships where he lost in the first round to Benedict Follett. In July that year, he also made his debut at Wimbledon Championships, but lost in the first round to J. Devans. In 1882, he won his first singles title at the South of England Championships in Eastbourne against Teddy Williams. In 1883, he reached the final of the Prince's Club Championships where he was beaten in straight sets by Scottish player Herbert Lawford. At the Wimbledon Championships that year, he reached the semi finals stage but was defeated in straight sets by Donald Stewart.

In 1884, he failed to retain his South of England title losing in the final to Teddy Williams, thus reversing the previous years result. At the Wimbledon Championships, he progressed to the quarter finals stage, but was beaten by Ernest Wool Lewis. In 1885, he traveled to Ireland to take part in a number of tournaments. At the prestigious Irish Lawn Tennis Championships in Dublin he was soundly beaten in the second round by Ernest Renshaw. He then played for the Fitzwilliam Plate a consolation event for early second round losers in the Irish Championships tournament, he reached the final but was beaten by Frederick Maddison.

After his tour of Ireland, he traveled back to England to take part in the Sussex County Lawn Tennis Tournament in Brighton, where he conceded the title by a walkover to Charles Hoadley Ashe Ross. Later that summer, playing in Eastbourne, he progressed to the final of the South of England Championships before losing in four sets to Ernest Lewis. In 1886, he took part in six tournaments that season his best results in singles came at the Wimbledon Championships when he reached the quarter finals round but lost to Ireland's Toler Garvey. In 1887, he traveled to the Netherlands to take part in an international hard court event called the Anglo Dutch Club Tournament held in Rotterdam where he won the singles title.

In 1888, he traveled to France to take part in the Boulogne International Championship held at the Hotel Bristol in Boulogne-sur-Mer where he won his third singles title against Edgar Chippendale. Later, he traveled back to London to compete at the Wimbledon Championships where he reached the semi finals for the second time, before losing to Herbert Wilberforce. Even though he never won another title after 1888, he did, however compete at 38 different tournaments over the next ten years. His best results were as an all-comers finalist at the British Covered Court Championships in 1889 where he lost to Wilberforce Eaves. He was a finalist again at the Boulogne International Championship in 1890. In 1891, he was a semi finalist at the London Covered Court Championships, and a semi finalist at the London Championships at Queen's Club. In 1897, he reached the finals of the Boulogne International, again losing to Charles Gladstone Allen. Taylor played his final singles event at the Boulogne International on clay in 1908 where he was beaten by French player Georges Octave Manset.

Taylor was also an accomplished player in doubles play. Apart from reaching the semi finals at the Wimbledon Championships in 1885 (partnering with Charles Ross) he also reached the quarterfinals five times (he partnered with Harry Grove in 1884, with Michael G. McNamara in 1886, with George Ziffo in 1887, with A. Taylor in 1893, and with Wilfred Milne in 1894.
