= John Redfern Deykin =

English tennis player (1867–1899)

John Deykin
- Full name: John Redfern Deykin
- Country (sports): United Kingdom
- Born: 27 July 1861 Edgbaston, Warwickshire, England
- Died: 30 March 1899 (aged 31) King's Norton, Worcestershire, England
- Turned pro: 1881 (amateur)
- Retired: 1894

Singles
- Career titles: 11

Grand Slam singles results
- Wimbledon: 1R (1884)

John Redfern Deykin born (27 July 1867 – 30 March 1899) also known as Redfern Deykin or J.R. Deykin was an English tennis player of the late 19th century. In 1884 competed at both the Irish Championships and Wimbledon Championships, then considered two of the most important major tennis events. He was active from 1881 until 1894 and contested 24 career singles finals, and won 11 titles.

== Career ==
Deykin played his first tennis event in at the 1881 Oxford University Champion Tournament (whilst studying there) losing in the first round. In 1882 he reached the final of the Edgbaston Open Tournament losing to Robert Braddell. In 1884 he played at the Midland Counties Championships and reached the final losing to Walter William Chamberlain in three sets. In June 1886 he played and won his first title at the Leamington Open Tournament Harry Brain. He then played at the Leicester Open Lawn Tennis Tournament progressing to the final, before losing to Charles Hoadley Ashe Ross in four sets. In 1887 he then played at the Midland Counties Championships for the second time where he won that title for the first time against Frank Noon in straight sets.

In 1888 he competed at the Warwickshire Championships, and made it to the final before losing to Charles Ross. He then played at the Teignmouth and Shaldon Open reaching another final, before losing to Herbert Chipp in four sets. This year he reached a third consecutive final at the Midland Counties Championships against Harry Stanley Scrivener, but was beaten in straight sets.

In 1889 Deykin would play at seven events this year winning three titles and losing three finals. At the Staffordshire Lawn Tennis Tournament he won that title against Ireland's William Drumond Hamilton. At the Waterloo Tournament in Liverpool he was a losing finalist to James Baldwin. Playing at the Edgbaston Open Tournament he reached the final again, but lost to James Baldwin. He collected a second Midland Counties title against Harold Weston Carlton in a close five set match. He then played the Exmouth Lawn Tennis Club Tournament, but lost in the final to one of the top players in the world at that time Ernest Wool Lewis. Deykin also reached the Staffordshire Tennis Tournament final for the second time before losing to Irishman Grainger Chaytor.

In 1890 Deykin entered seven tournaments this year, winning two titles. He retained his title at the Waterloo Tournament against William Parkfield Wethered, he retained his Midland Counties title defeating Henry Guy Nadin by three sets to one. In 1891 he played at six events that year, he did not win any titles, but was a losing finalist at the Edgbaston Open against R.A. Bennett. He also failed to retain his Waterloo title in Liverpool losing to Jacob Gaitskell Brown. In 1892 he reached the semi-finals of the Burton-on-Trent Open. In 1894 Dekin played his last tournament at the Midland Counties Championships, and was a losing finalist that year to R.A. Bennett.

John died on 30 March 1899 at the age of 37 the organisers of the Midland Counties tournament named the silverware awarded to winners of the gentleman's singles handicap event 'The Deykin Memorial Challenge Cup', to be played for the following year.

== Education ==
Deykin attended Pembroke College at the University of Oxford in 1880.

== Family ==
He was the son of James Deykin, and nephew of William Redfern Deykin of the company Deykin & Sons. One of John's younger sister's Ann Ethel Deykin (5 September 1872 – 25 November 1959) was also a tennis player.
