= P. G. von Donop =

English soldier and footballer; godfather of P. G. Wodehouse

Pelham George von Donop
- Born: Pelham George von Donop; 28 April 1851; Southsea, Hampshire
- Died: 7 November 1921 (aged 70); Mortlake, Surrey
- Relatives: Stanley von Donop (brother)
- Military career
- Allegiance: United Kingdom
- Branch: British Army
- Rank: Lieutenant-Colonel
- Conflicts: Nile Expedition

Lieutenant-Colonel Pelham George von Donop (28 April 1851 – 7 November 1921) was a British Army officer in the Royal Engineers and later Chief Inspecting Officer of Railways. He represented the Royal Engineers at association football, appearing in two FA Cup Finals, and also made two appearances for the England national football team.

He was the godfather of the writer Sir P. G. Wodehouse, who was named Pelham in his honour.

== Career ==
=== Early life ===
Donop was born in Southsea, Hampshire, the eldest of four sons (and three daughters) of Commander (later Vice-Admiral) Edward Pelham Brenton von Donop, RN.

He was educated at Royal Somersetshire College, Bath, before entering the Royal Military Academy at Woolwich in 1869. He represented the academy in the annual cricket match against the Royal Military College, Sandhurst, at Lord's on 23–24 May 1870 and played against the MCC at Lord's a year later.

He was commissioned as a lieutenant into the Royal Engineers on 15 December 1871 and the following April was posted to the School of Military Engineering at Chatham, Kent. Donop continued playing cricket while serving with the Royal Engineers: in one match, against the Harlequins at Chatham in June 1884 he scored 91 runs out of his side's total of 224.

=== Later career ===
Donop was promoted to captain in December 1883. In September 1884, as a member of the Royal Engineers' 8th Railway Corps Company, he was posted to Egypt to take part in the Nile Expedition. While in Sudan, his company constructed 87.5 miles (140.8 km) of railway track, from Sarras to Akasha, to facilitate the transport of provisions and stores to and from the fighting front. He returned from Egypt in June 1886. Between January 1889 and February 1894, he served as Inspector of Submarine Defences at Bombay, India, where, on 15 March 1890, he married Ethel Farran Orr, the daughter of a Bombay barrister. He was promoted to major in May 1890 and to lieutenant-colonel in December 1897.

He continued to play cricket at club level and, in January 1890, he made two appearances for G. F. Vernon's XI in matches against local sides at the Gymkhana Ground, Bombay. However, he never played in a top-class match.

In 1899, Donop temporarily left the Royal Engineers to become an Inspecting Officer of Railways for the Board of Trade's Railway Inspectorate. He formally resigned from the Royal Engineers in November 1902, while working for the Board, was promoted to Chief Inspecting Officer in July 1913 and held that position until his retirement in 1916. During his time with the Board of Trade he investigated numerous railway accidents, such as those at Witham, Essex in 1905 and at Ilford, Essex, in 1915, and also carried out safety inspections of tram services, such as that at Warrington, Lancashire. He died on 7 November 1921 and is buried in Mortlake.

Donop acted as godfather to the writer P. G. Wodehouse, who was named Pelham in his honour.

== Sportsman ==
=== Football ===
As well as playing cricket, Donop was soon selected to represent his regiment at football, and was in the Royal Engineers' team which reached the 1874 FA Cup Final. In the final, at Kennington Oval on 14 March 1874, Donop played at inside left. The Engineers lost 2–0 to Oxford University. The following year, the Engineers defeated Oxford University in the semi-final to set up a second consecutive appearance in the final, this time against the Old Etonians. The final was played at Kennington Oval on 13 March, with Donop now playing at centre half for the Engineers. The game ended in a goal-less draw. In the replay, at the same venue on 16 March, the Engineers won 2–0.

Donop also gained two caps for England in friendly matches against Scotland. He made his international debut on 8 March 1873, in the second official match played between the two countries, which England won 4–2. Donop, playing in the centre of the defence, was described as a "stalwart of the Royal Engineers team". He made his second international appearance two years later, on 6 March 1875, in a 2–2 draw.

Donop continued to represent the Royal Engineers until he was in his mid-thirties: in November 1886, he scored three goals in a match against the Royal Military Academy.

=== Tennis ===
Donop was also a notable tennis player, he won the men's doubles event at the Bermuda Open Tennis Championships in 1879 at Hamilton partnering Charles Wood. In 1881 he played his first singles event at the Gloucestershire Lawn Tennis Tournament in Cheltenham where he lost in the first round to George Butterworth. He also competed in the 1882 Wimbledon Championships. In 1884 he won the men's singles at the West of England Championships at Bath Between 1882 and 1883 he was a two time finalist in the men's singles event at the Exmouth Open losing to Charles Lacy Sweet on both occasions. In 1892 he was a finalist at the Western India Championships held at the Bombay Gymkhana Club.

== Family ==
His youngest brother Stanley served in the Royal Artillery, achieved public recognition when he led a column during the Second Boer War, served as Master-General of the Ordnance (the fourth member of the Army Board) and as Colonel Commandant of the Royal Regiment of Artillery, and ended his career as Major-General Sir Stanley von Donop KCB KCMG.

== Sporting honours ==
Royal Engineers

- FA Cup Final winner: 1875
- FA Cup Final finalist: 1874
