= George Ball-Greene =

Irish tennis player (1870–1958)

- Full name: George Courtney Ball-Green
- Country (sports): Ireland
- Born: 25 November 1870; Killiney, County Dublin, Ireland
- Died: 14 January 1958 (age 77); Dún Laoghaire, County Dublin, Eire
- Turned pro: 1890 (amateur tour)
- Retired: 1919

Singles
- Career record: 220–108
- Career titles: 10

Grand Slam singles results
- Wimbledon: 4R (1908)

Doubles

Grand Slam doubles results
- Wimbledon: SF (1902, 1903)

George Courtney Ball-Greene (25 November, 1870 – 14 January, 1958) was an Irish born tennis player. He was a two time semi-finalist at the Wimbledon Championships in the men's doubles event in 1902 and 1903. He was active from 1890 to 1919 and won 10 career singles titles.

== Career ==
George was born on 25 November 1870 in Killiney, County Dublin, Ireland. He played his first tournament at the North of Ireland Championships in 1890 where he reached the semi-finals. He competed at the Wimbledon Championships nine times between 1894 and 1919. In the men's singles events his best result was reaching the fourth round in 1908 where he lost to the Canadian player Robert Powell. He was somewhat more successful in the men's doubles reaching the semi-finals twice in 1902 partnering with Herbert Roper Barrett where they lost Clement Cazalet and George Hillyard, and in 1903 partnering with William Wilberforce where they were beaten by the Laurence Doherty and Reginald Doherty.

His main career singles highlights include winning the North of Ireland Championships (1891), Darlington Open (1891), Edgbaston Open Tournament (1893), Welsh Championships two times (1893–1894), Sussex Championships (1897), The Homburg Cup three times (1903–1905) and the Baden Baden International (1905). He played his last singles tournament at Deauville, France in 1912 where he lost in the early rounds to Max Decugis. He continued to play doubles events until 1919/1920. George died on 14 January 1958 at Dún Laoghaire, County Dublin, Republic of Ireland age 77.

== Career finals ==
Notes: All Comers Finalist where indicated by (*).

=== Singles: 36 (10 titles, 26 runners-up) ===
Category + (Titles)
Major (0)
National (2)
International (4)
Regional (1)
County (1)
Regular (2)

Titles by Surface
Clay – Outdoor (4)
Grass – Outdoor (6)
Hard – Outdoor (0)
Wood – Indoor (0)

Outcome	No.	Date	Tournament	Location	Surface	Opponent	Score
Winner	1.	1891	North of Ireland Championships	Belfast	Grass	(Ireland) Manliffe Goodbody	w.o.
Winner	2.	1891	Darlington Open	Darlington	Grass	(United Kingdom) Harold Weston Carlton	6–4, 6–3, 1–6, 6–2
Runner-up	1.	1891	Derbyshire Championships	Buxton	Grass	(Ireland) Grainger Chaytor	1–6, 1–6, 3–6
Runner-up	2.	1892	North of Ireland Championships	Belfast	Grass	(Ireland) Frank Stoker	w.o.
Runner-up	3.	1892	Darlington Open	Darlington	Grass	(Ireland) Grainger Chaytor	5–7, 3–6, 5–7
Runner-up	4.	1892	Nottinghamshire Championships	Nottingham	Grass	(Ireland) Frank Stoker	3–5, 2–6, 3–6
Winner	3.	1893	Edgbaston Open Tournament	Edgbaston	Grass	(England) Henry Lawrence Fleming	6–8, 6–1, 6–0, 6–3
Runner-up	5.	1893	Llandudno Open	Craigside	Grass	(Ireland) Manliffe Goodbody	6–1, 4–6, 3–6, 2–6,
Runner-up	6.	1893	Yorkshire Open Championships *	Ilkley	Grass	(Ireland) Harold Mahony	4–6, 7–9, 4–6,
Runner-up	7.	1893	Nottinghamshire Championships	Nottingham	Grass	(Ireland) Frank Stoker	3–6, 2–6, 2–6
Winner	4.	1893	Welsh Championships	Penarth	Grass	(United Kingdom) Harry Sibthorpe Barlow	2–6, 6–1, 7–5, 4–6, 6–4
Runner-up	8.	1894	Fitzwilliam Club Championships	Dublin	Grass	(Ireland) Tom Chaytor	2–6, 5–7, 0–6
Winner	5.	1894	Welsh Championships	Penarth	Grass	(United Kingdom) Roy Allen	7–5, 6–1, 4–6, 6–2
Runner-up	9.	1895	Bristol and Clifton Open	Clifton	Grass	(United Kingdom) Wilberforce Eaves	4–6, 6–3, 6–4 ret.
Runner-up	10.	1895	Teignmouth and Shaldon Open	Teignmouth	Grass	(United Kingdom) Harry Sibthorpe Barlow	4–6, 6–3, 6–4 ret.
Runner-up	11.	1895	Welsh Championships	Penarth	Grass	(United Kingdom) Wilberforce Eaves	4–6, 6–1, 2–6, 2–6
Runner-up	12.	1895	West of England Championships	Bath	Grass	(United Kingdom) Roy Allen	12–14, 4–6, 5–7
Runner-up	13.	1895	Sussex Championships	Brighton	Grass	(Ireland) Grainger Chaytor	6–3, 1–6, 4–6
Runner-up	14.	1897	Fitzwilliam Club Championships	Dublin	Grass	(Ireland) Walter Herbert Boyd	?
Winner	6.	1897	Sussex Championships	Brighton	Grass	(United Kingdom) Wilfred Baddeley	w.o.
Runner-up	15.	1897	German International Championships	Hamburg	Clay	(United Kingdom) George Hillyard	1–6, 2–6, 3–6
Runner-up	16.	1898	Fitzwilliam Plate	Dublin	Grass	(Ireland) Harold Adair Nisbet	0–6, 3–6, 6–1, 3–6
Runner-up	17.	1898	Sussex Championships	Brighton	Grass	(Ireland) Grainger Chaytor	1–6, 1–6, 6–2, 6–8
Runner-up	18.	1898	South of England Championships *	Eastbourne	Grass	(Ireland) Harold Mahony	6–8, 1–6, 3–6
Runner-up	19.	1899	Irish Championships *	Dublin	Grass	(United Kingdom) Reggie Doherty	3–6, 5–7, 2–6
Runner-up	20.	1902	Derbyshire Championships	Buxton	Grass	(United Kingdom) George Hillyard	6–2, 3–6, 8–6, 3–6, 2–6
Runner-up	21.	1902	Northumberland Championships	Newcastle upon Tyne	Grass	(United Kingdom) Sydney Howard Smith	2–6, 3–6, 3–6
Runner-up	22.	1903	Homburg International Championship	Bad Homburg	Clay	(United Kingdom) Major Ritchie	w.o.
Winner	7.	1903	The Homburg Cup	Bad Homburg	Clay	(United Kingdom) Major Ritchie	7–5, 7–5, 3–6, 2–6, 6–3
Runner-up	23.	1904	Baden Baden International	Baden-Baden	Clay	(Germany) Otto Froitzheim	w.o.
Winner	8.	1904	The Homburg Cup	Bad Homburg	Clay	(United States) Wylie Grant	9–7 6–2 6–3
Runner-up	24.	1904	Northumberland Championships	Newcastle upon Tyne	Grass	(United Kingdom) Laurie Doherty	4–6, 1–6
Winner	9.	1905	Baden Baden International	Baden-Baden	Clay	(New Zealand) Anthony Wilding	w.o.
Winner	10.	1905	The Homburg Cup	Bad Homburg	Clay	(New Zealand) Anthony Wilding	shared title
Runner-up	25.	1906	Baden Baden International	Baden-Baden	Clay	(New Zealand) Anthony Wilding	1–6, 3–6
Runner-up	26.	1906	Championship of Europe	Leicester	Grass	(United Kingdom) Frank Riseley	6–4, 1–6, 5–1, retd.
