= George Butterworth (tennis) =

British tennis player

- Full name: George Montague Butterworth
- Country (sports): United Kingdom
- Born: 12 May 1858 Gloucestershire, United Kingdom
- Died: 12 December 1941 (aged 83) Dorking, Surrey
- Turned pro: 1880 (amateur tour)
- Retired: 1896

Singles
- Career record: 29–12
- Career titles: 5

Grand Slam singles results
- Wimbledon: SF (1880)

Doubles

Grand Slam doubles results
- Wimbledon: QF (1884)

George Butterworth (1858–1941) was a British tennis player and sportsman active during the late 19th century. He was a semi finalist at the 1880 Wimbledon Championships losing to Herbert Lawford. Between 1880 and 1896 he won 5 career titles.

== Tennis career ==
Butterworth played his first tournament at the 1880 Wimbledon Championships where he reached the semi-finals stage, before losing to Herbert Lawford. In 1881 he played at four tournaments that year including the Cheltenham Covered Court Championships where he exited early in round one. The same year he won his first title at the Gloucestershire Lawn Tennis Tournament held at Montpellier Gardens, Cheltenham, and played on grass and asphalt courts. In 1882 he played only two tournaments that year at Wimbledon Butterworth lost in the second round to Richard Richardson. He then played at the West of England Championships at Bath and won the title against his brother Alexander Kaye Butterworth.

In 1883 he entered for play in five tournaments this year. He successfully defended his Gloucestershire title against George Mitton. He won a third title at the Clifton Lawn Tennis Tournament against Donald Stewart. He then travelled to Ireland to play at the Waterford Annual Lawn Tennis Tournament where he won his fifth and final title against Irishman Frederick William Knox. The same year he failed to defend his West of England title losing in the semi-finals to Ernest Browne. In 1884 he played one event in Ireland where he failed to defend his Waterford title losing Frederick Knox in straight sets.

Butterworth did not play another tournament until 1895 when he entered the Clifton Lawn Tennis Tournament, but lost in the first round by conceding a walkover to Herbert Baddeley. In 1896 he played the West of England Championships, but was beaten in the quarter-finals stage to George Lawrence Orme.

== Rugby ==
Butterworth was also a fine rugby player. He played for Clifton Rugby Football Club. He was also goalkeeper for Swindon Town FC.

== Work and family ==
Butterworth was a lawyer. In 1899 Herbert Chapman worked as a solicitor's clerk under the supervision of Butterworth in Swindon. He later emigrated to Christchurch, New Zealand. His son Hugh died in World War I. George Montague Butterworth's nephew was the composer George Butterworth.

Butterworth returned from New Zealand and lived near Bournemouth. He died in 1941 in a nursing home in Dorking.
