= Baden Baden International =

Defunct tennis tournament
- Tour: Pre-open era (1877–1967)
- Founded: 1896
- Abolished: 1966
- Editions: 55
- Location: Baden-Baden, Germany
- Venue: Baden-Baden Lawn Tennis Club
- Surface: Clay / outdoor

The Baden Baden International also known as the Baden-Baden tennis tournament and the Baden Baden Invitational was a tennis event held from 1896 through 1966 in Baden-Baden, Baden-Württemberg, Germany on outdoor Clay courts.

== History ==
The Baden Baden tournament was first held in 1896 played at the Baden Baden Lawn Tennis Club (today called the Rot-Weiss Tennis Club), Baden-Baden, Germany the tournament fluctuated between July, August, and September over the course of its run the tournament survived for 55 years with various breaks due to the first and second world wars.

== Finals ==
Notes: Challenge round: The final round of a tournament, in which the winner of a single-elimination phase faces the previous year's champion, who plays only that one match. The challenge round was used in the early history of tennis (from 1877 through 1921) in some tournaments not all.

* Indicates challenger

=== Men's singles ===
(Incomplete roll)

Year	Champions	Runners-up	Score
1896	(England) Reginald Doherty	(Germany) Victor Voss	6–1, 7–5, 6–2
1897	(England) Reginald Doherty (2)	(England) Laurence Doherty	walkover
1904	(Germany) Otto Froitzheim	(Ireland) George Ball-Greene	6–1, 3–6, 9–7
1905	(Ireland) George Ball-Greene	(New Zealand) Anthony Wilding	walkover
1906	(New Zealand) Anthony Wilding	(Ireland) George Ball-Greene	6–1, 6–2, 6–1
1907	(New Zealand) Anthony Wilding (2)	(Germany) Otto Froitzheim	6–3, 6–2, 6–3
1908	(New Zealand) Anthony Wilding (3)	(Germany) Otto Froitzheim	6–4, 6–3, 6–4
1909	(Germany) Otto Froitzheim	(Germany) Friedrich Wilhelm Rahe	walkover
1910	(Germany) Oscar Kreuzer (2)	(Germany) Otto Froitzheim	4–6, 4–6, 6–4, 6–1, 4-2 ret
1914–1919	Not held (due to world war one)		
1924	(Weimar Republic) Otto Froitzheim (3)	(Weimar Republic) Oscar Kreuzer	7–5, 6–2, 7–5
1925	(Weimar Republic) Johann Philip Buss	(Weimar Republic) Otto Reuter	6–1, 10–8, 6–4
1926	(Weimar Republic) Johann Philip Buss (2)	(Switzerland) Hector Fisher	7–5, 6–2, 6–2
1927	(Weimar Republic) Otto Froitzheim (4)	(United Kingdom) Pat Hughes	6–2, 6–2, 6–2
1928	(Weimar Republic) Otto Froitzheim (5)	(Denmark) Erik Worm	7–5, 6–4, 6–0
1929	(France) René de Buzelet	(Weimar Republic) Otto Froitzheim	6–2, 0–6, 2–6, 6–3, ret
1930	(United Kingdom) Pat Hughes	(Weimar Republic) Otto Froitzheim	2–6, 8–6, ret
1931	Tournament abandoned due to rain		
1932	(France) Jacques Brugnon	(United Kingdom) Pat Hughes	6–3, 6–2, 6–4
1933	(Germany) Gottfried von Cramm	(Germany) Louis Haensch	4–6, 6–3, 6–4
1934	(France) Marcel Bernard	(Germany) Johann Philip Buss	6–3, 6–4
1935	(Germany) Fritz Kuhlmann	(Germany) Henner Henkel	4–6, 5–7, 6–2, 6–3, 7–5
1936	(Germany) Henner Henkel	(Austria) Adam Borowski	5–7, 6–2, 7–5, 2–6, 7–5
1937	(France) Bernard Destremau	?	?
1938–1949	Not held (partly due to world war two)		
1950	(Egypt) Jaroslav Drobný	(Argentina) Heraldo Weiss	6–1, 6–1
1951	(Egypt) Jaroslav Drobný (2)	(Sweden) Sven Davidson	2–6 6–2 6–4 6–2
1952	(Egypt) Jaroslav Drobný (3)	(South Africa) Eric Sturgess	1–6 6–0 6–2
1953	(Egypt) Jaroslav Drobný (4)	(Sweden) Lennart Bergelin	7–5, 4–6, 6–4
1954	(Egypt) Jaroslav Drobný (5)	(Italy) Giuseppe Merlo	9–11, 4–6, 6–2, 6–3, 6–2
1955	(United States) Budge Patty	(Italy) Fausto Gardini	6–1, 8–6, 6–1
1956	(Belgium) Jacques Brichant	(United States) Budge Patty	6–2, 6–2
1957	(Italy) Giuseppe Merlo	(Germany) Rupert Huber	6–3, 5–7, 6–4, 2–6, 6–4
1958	(Sweden) Sven Davidson	(Belgium) Jacques Brichant	6–2. 6–2
1959	(West Germany) Wolfgang Stuck	(United Kingdom) Billy Knight	6–3, 6–3, 9–9, ret
1960	(Chile) Luis Ayala	(Denmark) Torben Ulrich	6–2, 6–4
1961	(Spain) Manuel Santana	(Chile) Luis Ayala	10–8, 4–6, 6–3
1962	(Australia) Neale Fraser	(Australia) Fred Stolle	6–1, 6–4
1963	(Australia) Roy Emerson	(Brazil) José Edison Mandarino	6–3, 9–7. 7–5
1964	(Spain) Manuel Santana (2)	(Brazil) Ronald Barnes	6–3, 6–3
1965	(Germany) Christian Kuhnke	(Australia) Tony Roche	3–6, 6–1, 6–3
1966	(Australia) Ken Fletcher	(Australia) John Newcombe	3–6, 6–3, 6–1

=== Women's singles ===
(incomplete roll)

Year	Champions	Runners-up	Score
1896	(England) Elsie Lane	? Miss Zographo	6–1, 6–0
1897	(England) Blanche Bingley Hillyard	(England) Charlotte Cooper	6–2, 6–4
1905	(England) Elsie Lane (2)	? Lucie Bergmann	6–4, 6–4
1906	(United Kingdom) Dorothea Douglass	(United Kingdom) Toupie Lowther	6–4, 6–4
1907	(United Kingdom) Daisy Kercheval-Hole	(Germany) Hedwig Neresheimer	6–4, 6–3
1908	(Germany) Dagmar von Krohn	(Austria) Marie Bertrand Amende	6–2, 6–0
1909	(United Kingdom) Agnes Morton	(Germany) Dagmar von Krohn	6–3, 6–2
1910	(United Kingdom) Agnes Morton (2)	(Germany) Hedwig Neresheimer	6–4 6–3
1913	(Germany) Lilly Salin	(Germany) Anita Heimann Lent	6–0, 7–5
1914–1919	Not held (due to world war one)		
1921	(Germany) Ilse Friedleben	(Germany) Frau von Udermann	?
1924	(Germany) Ilse Friedleben (2)	?	?
1925	(Germany) Irma Kallmeyer	(Germany) Erika de Lacroix	?
1926	(Germany) Ilse Friedleben (3)	(Germany) Irma Kallmeyer	6–1, 6–3
1927	(Germany) Irma Kallmeyer	(Germany) Anna Weihermann Hemp	6–8, 6–4, 7–5
1928	(Germany) Ilse Friedleben (4)	(Germany) Irma Kallmeyer	6–1, 6–2
1929	(France) Simonne Mathieu	(Germany) Ilse Friedleben	7–5, 6–2
1930	(France) Simonne Mathieu (2)	(Germany) Ilse Friedleben	6–2, 7–5
1931	(Germany) Ilse Friedleben (5)	(Germany) Paula von Reznicek	6–4, 4–6, 6–4
1932	(Switzerland) Lolette Payot	(Germany) Paula von Reznicek	4–6, 8–6, 6–3
1933	(Germany) Toni M. Schomburgk	(Germany) Klara Hammer	2–6, 6–1, 6–2
1935	(Germany) Marie-Louise Horn	(Germany) Anne Peitz Schneide	6–4, 6–1
1937	(Germany) Irmgard Rost	(Germany) Gisela Enger	6–4, 6–3
1938	(Germany) Totta Zehden	(Germany) Gisela Enger	6–1, 6–3
1940	(Germany) Hilde Weihe	(Germany) Fraulein Rduch	walkover
1941–1949	Not held (partly due to world war two)		
1950	(United States) Dorothy Head	(Argentina) Mary Terán de Weiss	7–5, 7–5
1951	(Argentina) Mary Terán de Weiss	(Czechoslovakia) Mrs Karel Kozeluh	2–6 6–2 6–4 6–2
1952	(United Kingdom) Joy Gannon Mottram	(United Kingdom) Joan Curry	?
1953	(United Kingdom) Joy Gannon Mottram (2)	(United States) Dorothy Head Knode	9–7, 1–6, 10–8
1954	(United Kingdom) Joy Gannon Mottram (3)	(Germany) Edda Buding	6–1, 6–1
1957	(Mexico) Yola Ramírez	(Germany) Edda Buding	6–2, 6–1
1958	(United Kingdom) Angela Mortimer	(Germany) Edda Buding	5–7, 6–3, 8–6
1959	(Germany) Edda Buding	(Germany) Erika Obst Launert	6–4, 7–5
1960	(United Kingdom) Angela Mortimer	(Mexico) Yola Ramírez	4–6, 6–2, 6–2
1961	(United Kingdom) Elizabeth Starkie	(Germany) Margot Dittmeyer	6–3, 1–6, 6–0
1962	(Brazil) Maria Bueno	(South Africa) Renée Schuurman	2–6, 6–4, 6–3
1963	(Argentina) Norma Baylon	(South Africa) Annette Van Zyl	6–2, 2–6, 6–2
1964	(Brazil) Maria Bueno (2)	(Argentina) Norma Baylon	6–3, 4–6, 6–4
1965	(Australia) Margaret Smith	(Australia) Lesley Turner	6–2, 6–1
1966	(Germany) Helga Schultze	(Germany) Helga Niessen	6–3, 3–6, 7–5

== See also ==
- History of tennis
