= Bristol and Clifton Open =

Defunct tennis tournament
- Tour: ILTF Circuit
- Founded: 1882; 144 years ago
- Abolished: 1897; 129 years ago
- Editions: 15
- Location: Clifton, Bristol, Gloucestershire, England
- Venue: Clifton Lawn Tennis Club
- Surface: Grass

The Bristol and Clifton Open was a late 19th century men's and women's tennis tournament first established in 1882 as the Clifton Lawn Tennis Tournament. It was played on outdoor grass courts at the Clifton Lawn Tennis Club, Clifton, Bristol, Gloucestershire, England. The tournament ran annually until 1897.

== History ==
In 1882 the Clifton Lawn Tennis Club was founded, with Bristol player Mr. Charles Lacy Sweet being appointed honorary club secretary. He became instrumental in the initial success of the Clifton Lawn Tennis tournament. In 1886 the tournament's name was changed to the Clifton Open. In 1895 the tournament had by this time grown in both size and importance it became part of the Western tour circuit, it was then rebranded as the Bristol and Clifton Open.

That year the event featured some of the biggest names in British tennis including; Charles Gladstone Allen, Edward Roy Allen, Herbert Baddeley, Wilfred Baddeley (Wimbledon Champion), Frank Riseley, Sydney Howard Smith, and Frank Riseley. The men's singles title that year was won by Wilberforce Eaves. There was no women's singles, but did include and mixed doubles featuring players such as Charlotte Cooper (Wimbledon Champion), Ruth Dyas, Lottie Paterson (the Scottish Champion), and Alice Pickering.

In 1897 the Gloucestershire Lawn Tennis Association was formed, it had originally staged an unofficial county level event in 1882 in Cheltenham. This year the association decided to officially create the Gloucestershire Championships and decided to move the tournament to Clifton as a replacement for the Bristol and Clifton Open, at which point this tournament was discontinued as a distinct event.

== Finals ==
=== Men's singles ===
(Incomplete roll)

Year	Winner	Runner-up	Score
Clifton Lawn Tennis Club Tournament
1882	(United Kingdom) Charles Lacy Sweet	(United Kingdom) Teddy Williams	6–3, 6–3
1883	(United Kingdom) George Butterworth	(United Kingdom) Donald Charles Stewart	6–3, 4–6, 6–2
1884	(United Kingdom) Charles Lacy Sweet (2)	(United Kingdom) Charles Walder Grinstead	6–3, 4–6, 6–2
Clifton Open
1886	(United Kingdom) Charles Lacy Sweet (3)	(United Kingdom) Mark Anthony Hartnell	w.o.
1890	(United Kingdom) Wilfred Baddeley	(United Kingdom) Charles Gladstone Allen	6–2,6–2
1891	(United Kingdom) Sydney Howard Smith	(United Kingdom) Charles Lacy Sweet	6–3, 5–7, 7–5
1894	(United Kingdom) Roy Allen	(United Kingdom) Horace Chapman	6–4, 6–1
Bristol and Clifton Open
1895	(United Kingdom) Wilberforce Vaughan Eaves	(Ireland) George Ball-Greene	4–6, 6–3, 6–4 ret.

=== Women's singles ===
(Incomplete roll)

Year	Winner	Runner-up	Score
Clifton Open
1886	(Ireland) Beatrice Langrishe	(United Kingdom) Nora Pope	6–2, 7–5

=== Mixed doubles ===
(Incomplete roll)

Year	Winner	Runner-up	Score
Clifton Open
1890	(United Kingdom) Wilfred Baddeley (Ireland) May Langrishe	(United Kingdom) Ernest Wool Lewis (United Kingdom) Violet Pinckney	6–3, 6–1
Bristol and Clifton Open
1895	(United Kingdom) Edward Roy Allen (United Kingdom) Alice Pickering	(Ireland) George Ball-Greene (United Kingdom) Charlotte Cooper	divided prizes

== Venue ==
Clifton Lawn Tennis Club was established in 1882, the club's facilities at this time consisted of four grass courts, the club added three hard asphalt courts by 1886. The Clifton tournament had outgrown the facilities of the venue by 1895 when it had hire the county cricket ground at Ashley Down, Bristol, for the use of the cricket ground during the week that had ten tennis courts.
