= John Galbraith Horn =

Scottish tennis player

John Horn
- Full name: John Galbraith Horn
- Country (sports): Scotland
- Born: 16 April 1860; Edinburgh, Midlothian, Scotland
- Died: 10 September 1925; Évian-les-Bains, France
- Turned pro: 1881 (amateur)
- Retired: 1893

Singles
- Career record: 71–46
- Career titles: 6

Grand Slam singles results
- Wimbledon: 2R (1882)

John Galbraith Horn (16 April 1860 – 10 September 1925) also known as J.G. Horn or Galbraith Horn was a Scottish tennis player who competed at the Wimbledon Championships in 1881 and 1882. He won the Scottish Championships three times consecutively from 1881 to 1883. He was active from 1881 to 1892 and won 6 career singles titles.

== Career ==
John Galbraith Horn was born In Edinburgh, Scotland in 1860. He attended Oxford University during the early 1880s, matriculating at University College on 13 October 1879.

He played and won his first tournament at the Scottish Championships in 1881. He competed in the men's singles events at the Wimbledon Championships in 1881 where he lost in the first round to Ernest Renshaw. At the 1882 championships he reached the second round before losing to Frank Benson.

His main career singles title successes came at the Scottish Championships which he won three times consecutivley (1881–1893), and was a finalist in (1884), He also won the Edinburgh University LTC Open (1883), the Fifeshire Championship (1885) and the West of Scotland Championships (1887).

In addition he was a losing finalist at the Oxford University Champion Tournament (1882), Darlington Open (1884, 1885, 1887), and the West of Scotland Championships (1894). Galbraith Horn played his final singles event at the Boulogne International Championship on clay in 1893.

He died on 10 September 1925 in Évian-les-Bains, France.
