= 1883 Wimbledon Championship – Singles =

Singles
- 1883 Wimbledon Championship

Final
- Champion: (United Kingdom) William Renshaw
- Runner-up: (United Kingdom) Ernest Renshaw
- Score: 2–6, 6–3, 6–3, 4–6, 6–3

Details
- Draw: 23
- Seeds: –

Events
Singles
← 1882 ·	Wimbledon Championship	· 1884 →

Ernest Renshaw defeated Donald Stewart 0–6, 6–3, 6–0, 6–2 in the All Comers' Final, but the reigning champion William Renshaw defeated Ernest Renshaw 2–6, 6–3, 6–3, 4–6, 6–3 in the challenge round to win the gentlemen's singles tennis title at the 1883 Wimbledon Championships. The challenge round was watched by 2500 spectators.

== Draw ==
=== Key ===
- Q = Qualifier
- WC = Wild card
- LL = Lucky loser
- Alt = Alternate
- SE = Special exempt
- PR = Protected ranking
- ITF = ITF entry
- JE = Junior exempt
- w/o = Walkover
- r = Retired
- d = Defaulted
- SR = Special ranking

=== Challenge round ===
Challenge Round
(United Kingdom) Ernest Renshaw	6	3	3	6	3
(United Kingdom) William Renshaw	2	6	6	4	6

=== All comers' finals ===
Semifinals
(United Kingdom) Donald Stewart	6	6	6
(United Kingdom) William Taylor	0	1	3
(United Kingdom) Ernest Renshaw
bye

Final
(United Kingdom) Donald Stewart	6	3	0	2
(United Kingdom) Ernest Renshaw	0	6	6	6

=== Top half ===
First round
(United Kingdom) Herbert Wilberforce
(United Kingdom) Francis Govett	w/o
(United Kingdom) John Hartley	6	6	6
(United Kingdom) Harry Barlow	1	3	1
(United Kingdom) Donald Stewart	6	3	3	6	6
(United Kingdom) Harry Grove	3	6	6	5	2
(United Kingdom) Claude Farrer	2	6	6	6
(United Kingdom) B Follett	6	2	2	1
(United Kingdom) FJ Ridgway	3	6	6	3	6
(United Kingdom) F Warren	6	1	1	6	4
(United Kingdom) William Taylor	2	6	1	6	6
(United Kingdom) Wilfred Milne	6	4	6	1	3
(United Kingdom) LG Campbell	4	5	6	6	6
(United Kingdom) Otway Woodhouse	6	6	1	5	4
(United Kingdom) MS Constable
(United Kingdom) Leopold Maxse	w/o

Second round
(United Kingdom) H Wilberforce	4	6	6	6
(United Kingdom) J Hartley	6	5	2	4
(United Kingdom) D Stewart	6	6	6
(United Kingdom) C Farrer	4	4	4
(United Kingdom) FJ Ridgway	0	4	1
(United Kingdom) W Taylor	6	6	6
(United Kingdom) LG Campbell	3	6	2	4
(United Kingdom) MS Constable	6	1	6	6

Quarterfinals
(United Kingdom) H Wilberforce	5	6	6	5	4
(United Kingdom) D Stewart	6	3	5	6	6
(United Kingdom) W Taylor	6	6	5	4	6
(United Kingdom) MS Constable	3	5	6	6	3

Semifinals
(United Kingdom) D Stewart	6	6	6
(United Kingdom) W Taylor	0	1	3

=== Bottom half ===
First round
(United Kingdom) Ernest Renshaw	5	6	3	6	6
(United Kingdom) Herbert Lawford	6	1	6	2	5
(United Kingdom) George Montgomerie	6	6	6
(United Kingdom) HH Playford	1	3	0
(United Kingdom) Charles Grinstead	4	6	6	4	6
(United Kingdom) Teddy Williams	6	4	4	6	5

Second round
(United Kingdom) E Renshaw	6	6	6
(United Kingdom) G Montgomerie	3	3	3
(United Kingdom) C Grinstead	6	5	6	6
(United Kingdom) Richard Richardson	3	6	5	2

Quarterfinals
(United Kingdom) E Renshaw	6	6	6
(United Kingdom) C Grinstead	4	3	3

Semifinals
(United Kingdom) E Renshaw
bye

Preceded by 1882 U.S. National Championships	Grand Slams men's singles	Succeeded by 1883 U.S. National Championships
