= Far & Near Open =

Defunct tennis tournament
- Event name: Fall Open Tournament Far and Near LTC
- Tour: USNLTA Circuit
- Founded: 1883
- Abolished: 1890
- Editions: 4 (known)
- Location: Hastings-on-Hudson, New York; United States
- Venue: Far and Near Lawn Tennis Club

The Far & Near Open was a late 19th-century men's grass court tennis tournament held at the Far and Near Lawn Tennis Club in Hastings-on-Hudson, New York, United States. Also known as the Far & Near Fall Open it was part of the USNLTA Circuit from 1883 to 1886.

== History ==
The Fall Open Tournament was a 19th-century men's grass court tennis tournament held at the Far and Near Lawn Tennis Club in Hastings-on-Hudson, New York, United States. The Far and Near Lawn Tennis Club existed from 1882 to 1890.

Of note: The Fall Open Tournament was probably staged until the club ceased in 1890 newspaper reports from 1885 indicate the same tournament was still going.

== Finals ==
Notes: Challenge round: The final round of a tournament, in which the winner of a single-elimination phase faces the previous year's champion, who plays only that one match. The challenge round was used in the early history of tennis (from 1877 through 1921) in some tournaments not all.

=== Men's singles ===
Included:

| Year | Winners | Runners up | Score |
|---|---|---|---|
| 1883 (Note: 1883 edition held from 26–27 October) | (United States) Richard Field Conover | (United States) Alexander Van Rensselaer | 6–1, 6–4 |
| 1884 (Note: 1884 edition held from 19–21 June) | (United States) Joseph Sill Clark Sr. | (United States) Richard Field Conover | 6–3, 7–5, 0–6, 6–3 |
| 1885 | (United States) Robert L. Beeckman | ? | ? |
| 1886 | (United States) Robert L. Beeckman | ? | ? |

=== Men's doubles ===
Included:

| Year | Winners | Runners up | Score |
|---|---|---|---|
| 1885 | (United States) Robert L. Beeckman (United States) H. L. Taylor | ? | ? |
| 1886 | (United States) Robert L. Beeckman (United States) H. W. Slocum | ? | ? |

=== Women's singles ===
| Year | Winners | Runners up | Score |
|---|---|---|---|
| 1887 | (United States) Adeline Robinson | (United States) Ellen Roosevelt | defeated |

== Sources ==
- "Abolition of Challenge Rounds". paperspast.natlib.govt.nz. EVENING POST, VOLUME CIII, ISSUE 65, 20 MARCH 1922.
- Hall, Valentine G. (1889). Lawn tennis in America. Biographical sketches of all the prominent players ... knotty points, and all the latest rules and directions governing handicaps, umpires, and rules for playing. New York USA: New York, D. W. Granbery & Co.
- Fall Open Tournament Far and Near LTC". New York Tribune. New York, United States. 27 October 1883.
- Nieuwland, Alex (2017). "Tournament – Fall Open Tournament Far and Near LTC". www.tennisarchives.com. Harlingen, Netherlands: Idzznew BV.
- "LAWN TENNIS AT HASTINGS". The New York Times. Hastings-on-the-Hudson, New York, United States. 27 June 1885.
- Society, Hastings Historical (2008). Hastings-on-Hudson. Mount Pleasant, South Carolina, United States: Arcadia Publishing. ISBN 9780738556840.
