= Walter Chamberlain =

- Full name: Walter William Chamberlain
- Country (sports): GBR
- Born: March 1862 Aston, Warwickshire, England
- Died: 26 July 1923 (age 62) Rawdon, West Riding of Yorkshire, England
- Turned pro: 1881 (amateur tour)
- Retired: 1886

Singles
- Career record: 72–23
- Career titles: 6

Grand Slam singles results
- Wimbledon: 2R (1884)

Walter William Chamberlain (March 1862 – 26 July 1923) was an English tennis player then later surgeon and general practitioner. He was active from 1881 to 1886 and won 6 career singles titles.

== Tennis career ==
Walter Chamberlain was born in Aston, Warwickshire, England in March 1862. In 1881 he played his first event at Gloucestershire Lawn Tennis Tournament. He won his first singles title at the Edgbaston Open Tournament in the same year. In 1882 he moved to Edinburgh in Scotland to study medicine at the University of Edinburgh graduating with an MB CM in 1887.

His other career singles highlights include winning the West of Scotland Championships in 1883, Edinburgh University LTC Open in 1884, the Midland Counties Championships in 1884, the Burton-on-Trent Open and the Worcestershire County Cricket Club Open also in 1884. In addition he was a finalist at the Edinburgh International Exhibition Tournament in 1886. He played his final tournament at the Scottish Championships in 1886 where he lost in the quarter finals to Archibald Thomson. Walter Chamberlain died 26 July 1923 age 62 at Rawdon, West Riding of Yorkshire, England.

== Work career ==
On leaving university in 1887 he was appointed house surgeon at Birmingham General Hospital. The appointed senior surgeon at the Royal Halifax Infirmary. his final appointment was as Chief Medical Officer Health of Rawdon District Council.

== Honours ==
Chamberlain was personally decorated by King Albert I of Belgium, King of the Belgians for services for Belgian and Allied troops under his care at Rawdon during World War I.
