= Redhill Open =

Defunct tennis tournament
- Founded: 1883
- Abolished: 1914
- Location: Redhill, Surrey, England
- Venue: Redhill Lawn Tennis Club
- Surface: Grass

The Redhill Open also known as the Redhill Open Lawn Tennis Tournament was an early men's and women's grass court tennis tournament first staged in July 1883, The tournament was staged at the Redhill Lawn Tennis Club (f. 1879), Redhill, Surrey, England, and ran until 1914 when it was ended due to the start of the Great War.

== History ==
The Redhill Open Lawn Tennis Tournament was a combined men's and women's grass court tennis event founded in 1883. The tournament was played on outdoor grass courts and ran until 1914. The tournament ended due to World War One, but was revived following the war.

Former winners of the men's singles included Leopold Maxse (1883), Anthony Wilding (1904-1905) and Kenneth Powell (1909-1910). Former women's singles winners include Dora Boothby (1902, 1905, 1908) and Agnes Morton won this event nine times (1903–04, 1906–07, 1909–12, 1914)

== Sources ==
- 1877 to 2012 Finals Results. (2022). stevegtennis.com. Steve G Tennis.
- Redhill Lawn Tennis Club / About Us". clubspark.lta.org.uk. Lawn Tennis Association.
- The Croydon Chronicle and East Surrey Advertiser, (30 July 1910).Redhill, Surrey, England.
- The Dorking and Leatherhead Advertiser, (Saturday 1 August 1914). Redhill, Surrey, England.
- The Surrey Mirror (7 July 1883). Redhill, Surrey, England.
