= Swanage Open Lawn Tennis Championships =

Defunct tennis tournament
- Tour: ILTF Circuit
- Founded: 1883; 142 years ago
- Abolished: 1979; 46 years ago
- Location: Swanage, Dorset, England
- Venue: Swanage Lawn Tennis Club
- Surface: Grass

The Swanage Open Lawn Tennis Championships or simply the Swanage Open was a men's grass court tournament founded in 1883 as the Swanage LTC Tournament. The tournament was held at Swanage Lawn Tennis Club, Swanage, Dorset, England until 1979.

== History ==
A Swanage Lawn Tennis Tournament was first established in 1883. In 1955 the men's singles was won by Geoffrey Paish who defeated the South African player Pierre Vercueil. The event was organised by the Swanage Lawn Tennis Club in Swanage, Dorset, England. The first edition of the tournament was won by Eustace Fiennes. The final edition of the men's singles was won by Michael Appleton.
