= Edinburgh University LTC Open =

Defunct tennis tournament
- Founded: 1882; 143 years ago
- Abolished: 1886; 139 years ago
- Editions: 5
- Location: Edinburgh, Midlothian, Scotland.
- Venue: Edinburgh University Lawn Tennis Club
- Surface: Grass

The Edinburgh University LTC Open was a late Victorian era men's and women's grass court tennis tournament established in 1882. The tournament was played annually at the Edinburgh University Lawn Tennis Club, Edinburgh University, Edinburgh, Midlothian, Scotland until 1886.

== History ==
In 1882 the Edinburgh University Lawn Tennis Club (f.1881), established the Edinburgh University LTC Open. The tournament was staged annually for five editions only before it was discontinued. Previous winners of the men's singles title included Scottish national champions John Galbraith Horn and Herbert Bowes-Lyon.

== Finals ==
=== Men's singles ===
| Year | Winner | Runner-up | Score |
|---|---|---|---|
| 1882 | (England) Arthur Walton Fuller | (Scotland) Charles Robert Andrew Howden | 3 sets to 0. |
| 1883 | (Scotland) John Galbraith Horn | (England) Arthur Walton Fuller | 3 sets to 1. |
| 1884 | (England) Walter William Chamberlain | (Scotland) Charles Robert Andrew Howden | 6-4, 6–3, 6–3. |
| 1885 | (Scotland) Herbert Bowes-Lyon | (Scotland) T. Leigh MacLachlan | 6-1, 6–2, 6–1. |
| 1886 | (Scotland) Herbert Bowes-Lyon | (United Kingdom) James H. Aitken | 8-6, 6–4, 6–3. |

== See also ==
- Tennis in Scotland
