= Portishead Open Lawn Tennis Tournament =

Defunct tennis tournament
- Founded: 1883
- Abolished: 1890
- Editions: 8
- Location: Portishead, Somerset, England
- Venue: Portishead Lawn Tennis Club
- Surface: Grass

The Portishead Open Lawn Tennis Tournament was a Victorian period combined men's and women's grass court tennis tournament first staged September 1882, organised by Portishead Lawn Tennis Club and held at Portishead, Somerset, England. The tournament ended around 1890.

== History ==
The Portishead Lawn Tennis was originally staged in July 1882 when it was held in conjunction with a Bazaar happening at the same time subsequently the event was thus co-promoted as the Lawn Tennis and Bazaar at Portishead.

The Bristol-based Western Daily Express reported on this event as follows:

The Lawn Tennis Tournament and Bazaar at Portishead. Second Day. With the accompaniment of fine weather play in the Lawn Tennis Tournament was resumed on Saturday at the cricket field. Though there was good attendance of visitor number's, the tennis tournament was not well attended.

— Lawn Tennis, Routledge's Sporting Annual (Monday 31 July 1882). p.3.

On 12 September 1883 the Portishead Open Lawn Tennis Tournament was officially established, at the first meeting of this tournament Charles Lacy Sweet won the men's singles title, against Lionel Wilberforce the brother of Herbert Wilberforce, the men's doubles was won by Charles Lacy Sweet and Mr. Pontifex defeating William Parkfield Wethered and F.E. Gibbs. The women's singles was won Miss Bryant, the women's doubles were won by Miss Reynolds and Miss Reynolds who defeated Miss Arden and Miss A. Lys, and the mixed doubles title was won by William Renshaw and Miss Arden who defeated Charles Lacy Sweet and Miss Miss A. Lys.

The inaugural open tournament received more positive reporting the following year in 1883.

The Lawn Tennis Tournament at Portishead. This open tournament, which lasted four days, was brought to a successful termination yesterday. There was a numerous gathering of spectators during the four days, and there was favourable weather each day.

— Lawn Tennis, Western Daily Press (Saturday 15 September 1883). p.3.

After the success of the 1883 tournament this event started to attract top players, and ever increasing attendances, and was held up to at least 1890.

The Western Daily Express once again reporting in 1887:

The Portishead Lawn Tennis Tournament. This popular tennis meeting was commenced on the prettily situated ground of the Portishead Lawn Tennis Club yesterday, and will be continued today and Saturday. The entries are more namerous this year.

— Lawn Tennis, Western Daily Press (Friday 14 September 1887). p.3.

== Sources ==
- Bristol Times and Mirror. (Friday 12 September 1890). Portishead Lawn Tennis Open Tournament. Bristol, Somerset. England.
- Routledges Sporting Annual (1883) Lawn Tennis Tournaments of 1882. George Routledge and Son. London.
- Western Daily Press. (Monday 31 August 1885). Portishead Open Lawn Tennis Tournament. Bristol, Somerset. England.
