= Edgbaston Open =

Defunct tennis tournament
- Founded: 1881
- Abolished: 1908
- Location: Edgbaston, Warwickshire, England
- Venue: Edgbaston Cricket and Lawn Tennis Club
- Surface: Grass

The Edgbaston Open was an early Victorian era men's and women's grass court tennis tournament first staged in June 1881, at the Edgbaston Cricket and Lawn Tennis Club, Edgbaston, Warwickshire, England. This distinct tournament ran until 1908.

== History ==
The Edgbaston Cricket and Lawn Tennis Club was founded in 1878 and continued to stage both events the Edgbaston Open tournament until 1908, and the Midland Counties Championships until November 1964. The Priory Lawn Tennis Club founded in 1865 and in May 1963 the Priory Club was destroyed by a fire, talks about merger took place of the coming months with the Edgbaston C.L.T.C. In December 1964 the new club was formed the Edgbaston Priory Club, which continued to host the Midland Counties event until 1977.

The Edgbaston Open tournament was established on 21 July 1881, and first staged at the ground of Edgbaston Cricket and Lawn Tennis Club, in Hall Hill Road, Edgbaston.

A description of the event that concluded on 23 July 1881:

On July 20th, 21st and 22nd, the Edgbaston Open Tournament was held with four competitions. Ladies' Singles went to Miss. M. Watson; Doubles, Miss. Watson and Miss. M. Watson. Gentleman's singles was won by W.W. Chamberlain; Doubles, by J.G. and W.W. Chamberlain, beating F. Goodacre and F.W. Rawlinson.

— Lawn Tennis in 1881, Routledge's Sporting Annual (1882). p. 69.

On 5 September 1882 the second edition of the Edgbaston Open lawn tennis tournament was held, on the same dates and venue a dual tournament was staged called the Midland Counties Lawn Tennis Tournament (1882-1977), the men's singles was won by Mr. R.W. Smith, and the Edgbaston Open Tournament was won by George Reston Brewerton. This tournament continued to be held separately to that of the counties championship until 1908.

Edgbaston Cricket and Lawn Tennis Club was in the early decades of the two clubs the more socially prestigious and nationally high-profile, and better resourced. The focus of the Priory Club was more local but its growth was similarly impressive. The Priory Club's tournaments and prizes were more restrained than Edgbaston's. Priory Club tournaments, and was played on six courts rather than the Edgbaston's twelve courts.

— The History of Edgbaston Priory Club (2013) by Dr. Matt Cole: Historian Edgbaston Priory Club. Page 2.

== Finals ==
Incomplete Roll

=== Men's Singles ===
Year	Winner	Runner-up	Score
1881	(United Kingdom) Walter William Chamberlain	(United Kingdom) F.S. Goodwin	6-3, 6-1, 6-4
1882	(England) George Reston Brewerton	(England) John Redfern Deykin	6-8, 6-4, 6-0, 6-2
1883	(England) Charles Walder Grinstead	(United Kingdom) Teddy Williams	6-3, 6-3
1884	(United Kingdom) Teddy Williams	(United Kingdom) Walter William Chamberlain	8-6, 6-2, 6-3
1885	(Ireland) Alfred Henry Betham	(United Kingdom) Walter William Chamberlain	6-1, 6-3, 8-6
1886	(England) John Redfern Deykin	(United Kingdom) C.H. Rossbent	shared title
1887	(England) Percy Bateman Brown	(United Kingdom) G.E. Lowe	6-3, 7-5, 6-2
1888	(United Kingdom) James Baldwin	(United Kingdom) Charles Hoadley Ashe Ross	7-9, 6-0, 6-2, 6-4
1889	(United Kingdom) James Baldwin (2)	(England) John Redfern Deykin	6-4, 6-4, 6-4
1890	(United Kingdom) James Baldwin (3)	(England) Ernest Crawley	6-3, 6-3, 6-0
1891	(United Kingdom) R.A. Bennett	(England) John Redfern Deykin	?
1892	(England) Henry Guy Nadin	(United Kingdom) G.F. Goodman	6-2, 6-2, 6-2
1893	(Ireland) George Ball-Greene	(Scotland) Henry Lawrence Fleming	6-8, 6-1, 6-0, 6-3
1894	(England) Wilfred Baddeley	(England) Harry Sibthorpe Barlow	6-2, 4-6, 0-6, 6-4, 6-4
1895	(England) Sydney Howard Smith	(England) Roy Allen	5-7, 6-3, 9-7
1897	(England) George Hillyard	(England) Sydney Howard Smith	divided title
1906	(United Kingdom) E.V. Jones	(England) Ernest George Bisseker	6-0, 6-1, 6-2
1908	(United Kingdom) E.V. Jones (2)	(England) Frederick A. L'Estrange Burgess	6-2, 6-1, 6-1

== Sources ==
- Birmingham Daily Post. Thursday 23 August 1883. Birmingham, Warwickshire. England.
- Cole, Dr. Matt (2013). "History" (PDF). edgbastonpriory.com. Edgbaston Priory Club, Edgbaston, Birmingham, England.
- Heritage, (2021). edgbastonpriory.com. Edgbaston, Birmingham, England.
