= Teddy Williams (tennis) =

British tennis player (1866–1911)

- Full name: Edward Lake Williams
- Country (sports): (United Kingdom) Great Britain
- Born: 1 July 1866 Bushey, Hertfordshire, England
- Died: 11 November 1911 (Age 45) Johannesburg, South Africa
- Turned pro: 1881 (amateur tour)
- Retired: 1908

Singles
- Career record: 64–21 (75.3%)
- Career titles: 6

Grand Slam singles results
- Wimbledon: 1R (1883, 1884)

Doubles

Grand Slam doubles results
- Wimbledon: F (1884)

Edward Lake Williams (1 July 1866 – 11 November 1911) was a British tennis player active in the late 19th and early 20th centuries. He was a finalist in the men's doubles at the 1884 Wimbledon Championships partnering Ernest Wool Lewis where they lost to William Renshaw and Ernest Renshaw. In singles he was quarter finalist at the Northern Championships, and semi-finalist at the Princes Club Championships in 1883. From 1881 until 1908 he contested 13 career finals and won 6 titles in singles.

== Career ==
Teddy was born Edward Lake Williams on 1 July 1866 in Bushey, Hertfordshire, England. He played his first tournament at the London Athletic Club Open Tournament in 1881 when he lost in the second round. In 1882 he played 4 tournaments this year, he won his first title at the Agricultural Hall Tournament held at the Royal Agricultural Hall, Islington, Middlesex on indoor wood courts against Ernest de Sylly Hamilton Browne by 2 sets to 1.

In 1883 at the Princes Club Championships held at Hans Place, Kensington he reached the semi-finals, before losing to Herbert Lawford in straight sets. He was then a finalist at the Exmouth LTC Tournament, but was defeated by Charles Walder Grinstead in straight sets. He then played at the Northern Championships, then considered the third most important tournament in the world according to the Daily Telegraph tennis correspondent A. Wallis Myers, where he progressed to the quarter-final stage, before losing to John Hartley in five close sets. He was also losing finalist at the Midland Counties Championships at Edgbaston losing to Grinstead again. In July he competed at the Wimbledon Championships, but he lost in round one in five sets to Charles Grinstead. His final tournament of 1883 was at the South of England Championships in Eastbourne, where after losing two previous finals to Charles Grinstead, he defeated him over 4 sets.

In 1884 Williams played seven tournaments this year. At the Irish Championships held in Dublin in the spring, he went out in round two, to Herbert Lawford. In the summer he played both the singles and doubles events at the Wimbledon Championships, he exited early in the singles event, but partnering Ernest Wool Lewis (who he played doubles with regularly) they reached the men's doubles final before losing to William Renshaw and Ernest Renshaw. Arthur Wallis Meyers writing in his book Lawn Tennis at Home and Abroad (1904) ranked the pairing of Lewis and Williams a close second to the Renshaw twins. He then played at the Warwickshire Championships at Leamington Spa and won the title against Frank Seymour Noon by 3–0 sets. At Wimbledon he exited early in the first to Ernest Renshaw. He returned to defend his title at Eastbourne, and won the South of England Championships against William Taylor.

In 1885 he played at only one event this year, the Brookfield Tournament held on the Isle of Wight, he reached the final, but lost to the American James Dwight 1 to 3 in sets. In 1886 Williams competed at only two tournaments this year. At the Middlesex Championships held at Chiswick Park he progressed to the final, but was defeated by Harry Grove in straight sets. He then won his last tournament at the prestigious British Covered Court Championships at the Hyde Park Lawn Tennis Club on indoor wood courts against Herbert Fortescue Lawford by 3 sets to 2.

In 1887 he was finalist at the British Covered Court Championships, however he failed to defend his title in challenge round against Ernest Wool Lewis 6–2, 6–2, 6–1. Around 1888 he emigrated to South Africa, and did not play tennis for a few years. In 1891 he took part in a provincial level tournament the Southern Transvaal Championships, but he did not progress in the event exiting early. He then went into another period of semi retirement until 1908 when he played his last tournament at the Southern Transvaal Championships held at the Wanderers’ Club, Johannesburg, Transvaal, South Africa.

== Career Finals ==
=== Singles: 13 (6 titles, 7 runner-up) ===
Incomplete Roll

Category + (Titles)
Important (0)
National (1)
Regional (2)
County (1)
Regular (2)

Titles by Surface
Clay – Outdoor (0)
Grass – Outdoor (4)
Hard – Outdoor (0)
Carpet – Indoor (0)
Wood – Indoor (2)

| No. | Result | Date | Tournament | Location | Surface | Opponent | Score |
|---|---|---|---|---|---|---|---|
| 1. | Win | 1882 | Agricultural Hall Tournament | Islington | Wood (i) | (Ireland) Ernest Browne | 5–7, 6–4, 10–8 |
| 2. | Loss | 1882 | Warwickshire Championships | Leamington | Grass | (United Kingdom) Robert Braddell | 5–7, 2–6, 3–6 |
| 3. | Loss | 1882 | South of England Championships | Eastbourne | Grass | (United Kingdom) William C. Taylor | 6–8, 2–6, 6–3, 3–6 |
| 4. | Loss | 1883 | Exmouth LTC Tournament | Exmouth | Grass | (United Kingdom) Charles Walder Grinstead | 2–6, 5–6, 4–6 |
| 5. | Loss | 1883 | Midland Counties Championships | Edgbaston | Grass | (United Kingdom) Charles Walder Grinstead | 3–6, 3–6, 3–6 |
| 6. | Win | 1883 | South of England Championships | Eastbourne | Grass | (United Kingdom) Charles Walder Grinstead | 6–1, 8–6, 4–6, 7–5 |
| 7. | Win | 1884 | Warwickshire Championships | Leamington | Grass | (England) Frank Seymour Noon | 6–3, 6–2, 6–3 |
| 8. | Win | 1884 | South of England Championships | Eastbourne | Grass | (United Kingdom) William C. Taylor | 6–1, 8–6, 4–6, 7–5 |
| 9. | Win | 1884 | Edgbaston Open Tournament | Edgbaston | Grass | (United Kingdom) Walter W. Chamberlain | 8–6, 6–2, 6–3 |
| 10. | Loss | 1885 | Brookfield Isle of Wight Open | Ryde | Grass | (United States) James Dwight | 4–6, 6–2, 4–6, 2–6 |
| 11. | Loss | 1886 | Middlesex Championships | Chiswick | Grass | (United Kingdom) Robert Braddell | 3–6, 2–6, 3–6 |
| 12. | Win | 1886 | British Covered Court Championships | Hyde Park | Wood (i) | (England) Herbert Lawford | 6–2, 1–6, 5–7, 6–4, 6–4 |
| 13. | Loss | 1887 | British Covered Court Championships | Hyde Park | Wood (i) | (United Kingdom) Ernest Wool Lewis | 2–6, 2–6, 1–6 |

== Sources ==
- BMD Entry Info: Williams L. Edward: Births Registered". www.freebmd.org.uk. BMD UK. September 1866.
- Player Profile: Teddy Williams: Gentleman's Singles Results". www.wimbledon.com. All England Lawn Tennis and Croquet Club.
- Myers, Arthur Wallis (1903). Lawn Tennis at Home and Abroad. London: Scribner's sons.
