= Warwickshire Championships =

Defunct tennis tournament
- Founded: 1882
- Abolished: 1931
- Editions: 49
- Location: Leamington Spa, Warwickshire, England
- Venue: Leamington Lawn Tennis Club
- Surface: outdoor (grass)

The Warwickshire Championships, also known as the Warwickshire County Championships, was a men's and women's grass court tennis tournament held at Leamington Spa, Warwickshire, England. It was founded on 1 August 1882 and held until 1931 as part of the pre-open era tennis tour. As of 2023, the tournament is staged as a local county championship.

== History ==
The Warwickshire Championships were established on 1 August 1882, and first staged at Jephson Gardens. At the same meeting held in August 1882, a dual tournament called the Leamington Open Tournament (1882–1931) was staged.

At the inaugural Warwickshire Championships, the Warwickshire men's singles was won by Mr. Erskine Gerald Watson (brother of Maud Watson), the Warwickshire men's doubles was won by Mr. G.S. Raynor and Mr. Edward Lake Williams, the Warwickshire women's doubles was won by Miss. J.C. Kay and Miss. W.E. Graham, and the Warwickshire pairs was won by Erskine Gerald Watson and Maud Watson.

== Sources ==
- County Championships. .lta.org.uk. Lawn Tennis Association UK.
- Nieuwland, Alex. "Tournament – Warwickshire Championships". www.tennisarchives.com. A. Nieuwland.
- Routledges Sporting Annual (1883) George Routledge and Son. London.
- Warwickshire County Tennis Championships. Leamington Lawn Tennis & Squash Club". lltsc.co.uk.
