= South of England Championships =

Coordinates: 50°45′51″N 0°17′0″E

Defunct tennis tournament
- Event name: South of England Championships
- Founded: 1881; 145 years ago
- Abolished: 1973; 53 years ago
- Editions: 82
- Location: Eastbourne; United Kingdom
- Venue: Devonshire Park Lawn Tennis Club
- Surface: Grass / outdoors

The South of England Championships, also known as the South of England Open Championships, was an outdoor tennis event held on grass courts at the Devonshire Park Lawn Tennis Club in Eastbourne, United Kingdom from 1881 until 1973.

== History ==
The competition at Eastbourne, even from its early beginnings, was considered one of the most prestigious tournaments that attracted large entries and matches even in those days and it was the world's largest tournament in terms of participants at the turn of the twentieth century.

=== Women's tennis ===
The first tournament to be staged at Devonshire Park was a women's event in 1881, known as the South of England Championships, and usually held every September. Winners of the lady's singles championships included Dorothea Chambers, Blanche Bingley Hillyard, and Charlotte Cooper Sterry, May Langrishe. The first overseas non British Isles winner was the American Elizabeth Ryan in collecting 3 consecutive titles (1919–21); after World War One she was followed by the South African Irene Peacock in 1923 and Anita Lizana from Chile in 1936.

Following World War Two tennis British winners included Ann Haydon and Shirley Bloomer the Brazilian player Maria Bueno the Australian player Fay Toyne was the last foreign ladies champion before the advent of the open era in 1968 the South of England Championships changed schedule to July until 1969 after the Championships at Wimbledon in 1970 its schedule changed again so that it was held before Wimbledon the South of England Championships continued until 1967.

From 1968 until today the tournament has attracted many different sponsors.

In 1968 it was known as the Rothman's Invitational for sponsorship reasons from 1969 to 1972 it was called the Eastbourne Invitational, the event ceased in 1972.

=== Men's tennis ===
The first Men’s events started in 1881 also called the South of England Championships early winners of the men's championship included Wilfred Baddeley, Sydney Howard Smith, Josiah Ritchie, Anthony Wilding, Otto Froitzheim and Ken Rosewall it continued until 1967 before being renamed for sponsorship reasons in 1968 from 1970 to 1973 the men's tournament was known as the Rothmans South of England Open Championships. The men's event also ceased in 1973.

=== Tennis after 1973 ===
In 1974 the Devonshire Park Lawn Tennis club decided on a completely new format tennis tournament and re-branding of tennis at Eastbourne from the outcome of staging the South of England Championships that became known as the Eastbourne International the tournament is still active today.

== Past finals ==
Notes: Challenge round: The final round of a tournament, in which the winner of a single-elimination phase faces the previous year's champion, who plays only that one match. The challenge round was used in the early history of tennis (from 1877 through 1921) in some tournaments not all.

* Indicates challenger

Blanche Bingley Hillyard holds the record for the most women's singles titles with 11.

=== Singles ===
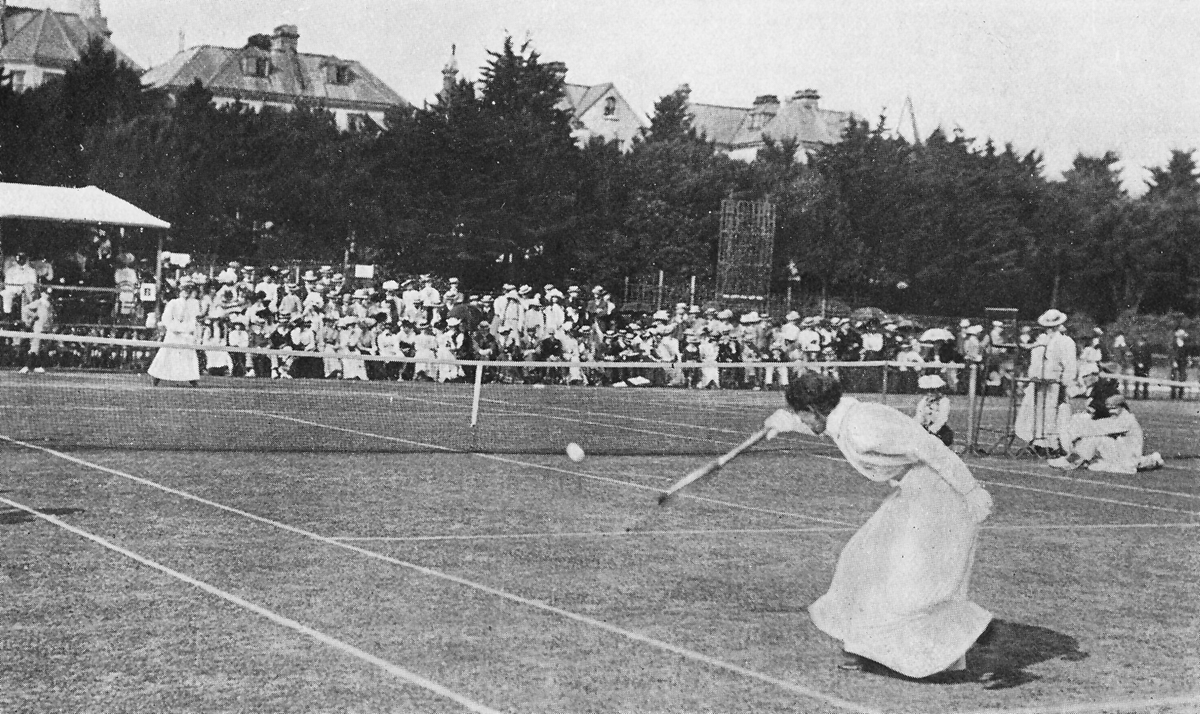
Ladies' final between Hillyard and Cooper Sterry

==== Women ====
Year	Champion	Runner-up	Score	Name
1881	(England) Agnes Noon Watts	(England) E. Hudson	(2-1 sets)	South of England Championships
1882	(England) E. Hudson	(England) Minnie Congreve	6–2, 6–4	South of England Championships
1883	(England) M. Leslie	(England) Minnie Congreve	10–8, 6–4	South of England Championships
1884	(England) Frances Burton	(England) Nellie Burton	6–2, 6–4	South of England Championships
1885	(England) Blanche Bingley	(England) Ada Strapp	6–1, 6–0	South of England Championships
1886	(England) Margaret Bracewell	(England) Blanche Bingley	6–1, 6–3	South of England Championships
1887	(England) Margaret Bracewell (2)	(England) Blanche Bingley	6–4, 6–2	South of England Championships
1888	(England) Blanche Bingley (2)	(England) Margaret Bracewell	6–1, 6–1	South of England Championships
1889	(Ireland) May Langrishe	(England) May Jacks	6–2, 5–7, 6–1	South of England Championships
1890	(Ireland) May Langrishe (2)	(England) Edith Coleridge Cole	6–2, 6–3	South of England Championships
1891	(England) Blanche Bingley Hillyard (3)	(Ireland) May Langrishe	2–6, 7–5, 6–0	South of England Championships
1892	(England) Blanche Bingley Hillyard (4)	(United Kingdom) Bertha Steedman	6–1, 6–4	South of England Championships
1893	(England) Blanche Bingley Hillyard (5)	(England) Maud Shackle	6–1, 4–6, 15–13	South of England Championships
1894	(United Kingdom) Helen Jackson	(United Kingdom) Charlotte Cooper	6–4, 6–2	South of England Championships
1895	(England) Blanche Bingley Hillyard (6)	(United Kingdom) Helen Jackson	6–4, 6–1	South of England Championships
1896	(England) Blanche Bingley Hillyard (7)	(England) Edith Austin	6–3, 4–6, 6–1	South of England Championships
1897	(United Kingdom) Charlotte Cooper	(England) Blanche Bingley Hillyard	6–4, 6–0	South of England Championships
1898	(England) Blanche Bingley Hillyard (8)	(United Kingdom) Charlotte Cooper	7–5, 7–5	South of England Championships
1899	(England) Blanche Bingley Hillyard (9)	(United Kingdom) Charlotte Cooper	6–2, 6–2	South of England Championships
1900	(England) Blanche Bingley Hillyard (10)	(United Kingdom) Charlotte Cooper	7–9, 6–3, 6–3	South of England Championships
1901	(United Kingdom) Charlotte Cooper (2)	(England) Blanche Bingley Hillyard	7–5, 5–7, 6–2	South of England Championships
1902	(United Kingdom) Dorothea Douglass	(England) Edith Austin Greville	6–2, 6–2	South of England Championships
1903	(United Kingdom) Connie Wilson	(United Kingdom) Dorothea Douglass	7–5, 6–2	South of England Championships
1904	(United Kingdom) Dorothea Douglass (2)	(United Kingdom) Charlotte Cooper Sterry	6–3, 6–4	South of England Championships
1905	(England) Blanche Bingley Hillyard (11)	(United Kingdom) Agnes Morton	7–5, 4–6, 6–3	South of England Championships
1906	(United Kingdom) Dorothea Douglass (3)	(United Kingdom) Agnes Morton	3–6, 6–3, 6–2	South of England Championships
1907	(United Kingdom) Dorothea Douglass Chambers (4)	(United Kingdom) Charlotte Cooper Sterry	4–6, 6–3, 7–5	South of England Championships
1908	(United Kingdom) Charlotte Cooper Sterry (3)	(United Kingdom) Edith Boucher	6–4, 6–2	South of England Championships
1909	(England) Dora Boothby	(United Kingdom) Charlotte Cooper Sterry	6–3, 6–4	South of England Championships
1910	(United Kingdom) Dorothea Douglass Chambers (5)	(United Kingdom) Ethel Thomson Larcombe	7–5, 7–5	South of England Championships
1911	(United Kingdom) Ethel Thomson Larcombe	(England) Dora Boothby	7–5, 6–3	South of England Championships
1912	(United Kingdom) Ethel Thomson Larcombe (2)	(United Kingdom) Agnes Morton	6–1, 6–2	South of England Championships
1913	(United Kingdom) Ethel Thomson Larcombe (3)	(United Kingdom) Dorothea Douglass Chambers	6–2, 6–4	South of England Championships
1914–1918	Not held (due to world war one)			South of England Championships
1919	(United States) Elizabeth Ryan	(United Kingdom) Phyllis Satterthwaite	6–1, 6–2	South of England Championships
1920	(United States) Elizabeth Ryan (2)	(England) Geraldine Beamish	6–2, 4–6, 6–1	South of England Championships
1921	(United States) Elizabeth Ryan (3)	(South Africa) Irene Bowder Peacock	6–0, 6–3	South of England Championships
1922	(South Africa) Irene Bowder Peacock	(United Kingdom) Kathleen McKane	6–0, 3–6, 7–5	South of England Championships
1923	(United Kingdom) Phoebe Holcroft	(United Kingdom) Christine Tyrrell	6–3, 6–3	South of England Championships
1924	(United Kingdom) Ermyntrude Harvey	(United Kingdom) Phoebe Holcroft	6–0, 6–8, 6–4	South of England Championships
1925	(United Kingdom) Phoebe Holcroft Watson (2)	(United Kingdom) Christine Tyrrell	2–6, 7–5, 6–3	South of England Championships
1926	(United Kingdom) Phoebe Holcroft Watson (3)	(United Kingdom) Ermyntrude Harvey	6–4, 6–8, 6–2	South of England Championships
1927	(United Kingdom) Phoebe Holcroft Watson (4)	(United Kingdom) Phyllis Howkins Covell	6–2, 6–2	South of England Championships
1928	(United Kingdom) Phoebe Holcroft Watson (5)	(United Kingdom) Phyllis Howkins Covell	6–1, 6–2	South of England Championships
1929	(United Kingdom) Elsie Goldsack	(India) Jenny Sandison	8–6, 2–6, 6–3	South of England Championships
1930	(England) Phyllis Mudford	(United Kingdom) Mary Heeley	6–2, 7–5	South of England Championships
1931	(United Kingdom) Freda James	(England) Gwen Sterry	divided the title	South of England Championships
1932	(United Kingdom) Mary Heeley	(United Kingdom) Florence Ford	8–6, 6–2	South of England Championships
1933	(England) Phyllis Mudford King (2)	(United Kingdom) Ermyntrude Harvey	6–3, 6–1	South of England Championships
1934	(United Kingdom) Dorothy Round	(England) Phyllis Mudford King	6–4, 6–1	South of England Championships
1935	(United Kingdom) Billie Yorke	(England) Susan Noel	3–6, 6–3, 6–2	South of England Championships
1936	(Chile) Anita Lizana	(United Kingdom) Dorothy Round	6–4, 6–2	South of England Championships
1937	(United Kingdom) Margaret Scriven	(United Kingdom) Jean Saunders	6–1, 6–0	South of England Championships
1938	(England) Phyllis Mudford King (3)	(England) Valerie Scott	5–7, 6–4, 6–4	South of England Championships
1939–1945	Not held (due to world war two)			South of England Championships
1946	(United Kingdom) Joan Curry	(United Kingdom) Betty Clements Hilton	divided the title (rain interruption)	South of England Championships
1947	(United Kingdom) Joan Curry (2)	(United Kingdom) Peggy Dawson-Scott	6–1, 9–7	South of England Championships
1948	(United Kingdom) Jean Walker-Smith	(United Kingdom) Gem Hoahing	7–5, 6–4	South of England Championships
1949	(United Kingdom) Gem Hoahing	(Argentina) Mary Terán de Weiss	6–4, 6–2	South of England Championships
1950	(United Kingdom) Jean Walker-Smith (2)	(United Kingdom) Jean Quertier	6–2, 6–2	South of England Championships
1951	(United Kingdom) Jean Walker-Smith (3)	(United Kingdom) Angela Mortimer	6–2, 6–2	South of England Championships
1952	(United Kingdom) Jean Walker-Smith (4)	(United Kingdom) Jean Quertier Rinkel	6–3, 6–4	South of England Championships
1953	(United Kingdom) Shirley Bloomer	(United Kingdom) Patricia Harrison	7–5, 6–4	South of England Championships
1954	(United Kingdom) Shirley Bloomer (2)	(United Kingdom) Patricia Harrison	6–8, 7–5, 6–0	South of England Championships
1955	(United Kingdom) Anne Shilcock	(United Kingdom) Jenny Middleton	6–4, 6–2	South of England Championships
1956	(United Kingdom) Anne Shilcock (2)	(United Kingdom) Penny Burrell	6–1, 6–2	South of England Championships
1957	(United Kingdom) Ann Haydon	(United Kingdom) Angela Mortimer	6–3, 6–4	South of England Championships
1958	(United Kingdom) Anne Shilcock (3)	(United Kingdom) Sheila Waters	6–0, 6–0	South of England Championships
1959	(United Kingdom) Sheila Armstrong	(United Kingdom) Jenny Young	6–0, 6–2	South of England Championships
1960	(United Kingdom) Rita Bentley	(United Kingdom) Lorna Cornell Cawthorn	6–4, 6–2	South of England Championships
1961	(United Kingdom) Lorna Cornell Cawthorn	(Denmark) Inge Overgaard	3–6, 6–1, 11–9	South of England Championships
1962	(United Kingdom) Carole Rosser	(United Kingdom) Lorna Cornell Cawthorn	10–8, 6–2	South of England Championships
1963	(United Kingdom) Vivienne Dennis	(United Kingdom) Heather Allen	6–3, 2–6, 7–5	South of England Championships
1964	(Australia) Fay Toyne	(United Kingdom) Lorna Cornell Cawthorn	6–0, 5–7, 6–3	South of England Championships
1965	(United Kingdom) Rita Bentley (2)	(Australia) Jill Blackman	divided the title (due to bad weather)	South of England Championships
1966	(United Kingdom) Susan Tutt	(United Kingdom) Anthea Rigby	4–6, 6–2, 6–4	South of England Championships
1967	(United Kingdom) Lorna Cornell Greville-Collins (2)	(Australia) Margaret Harris	6–8, 7–5, 6–1	South of England Championships
↓ Open era ↓
1968	(Brazil) Maria Bueno	(Australia) Judy Tegart	6–2, 6–4	Rothmans Invitational
1969	(Australia) Karen Krantzcke	(United States) Betty Ann Grubb	6–0, 9–7	Eastbourne Invitational
1970	(United Kingdom) Ann Haydon Jones (2)	(United Kingdom) Virginia Wade	8–6, 6–1	Eastbourne Invitational
1971	(France) Françoise Durr	(Australia) Judy Tegart-Dalton	divided the title	Eastbourne Invitational
1972	(France) Françoise Durr (2)	(Australia) Judy Tegart-Dalton	8–6, 6–3	Eastbourne Invitational
1973	Tournament succeeded by Eastbourne International			

==== Men ====
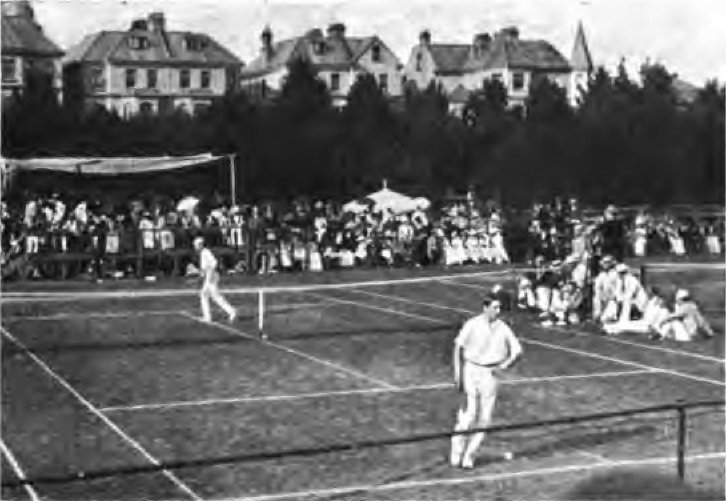
1890 Men's Singles final between Ziffo and Baldwin

Year	Champion	Runner-up	Score	Name
1881	(United Kingdom) Edgar Lubbock	(United Kingdom) Robert Braddell	6–4, 6–2, 6–0	South of England Championships
1882	(United Kingdom) William Taylor	(United Kingdom) Teddy Williams	8–6, 6–2, 3–6, 6–3	South of England Championships
1883	(United Kingdom) Teddy Williams	(England) Charles Walder Grinstead	6–1, 8–6, 4–6, 7–5	South of England Championships
1884	(United Kingdom) Teddy Williams (2)	(United Kingdom) William Taylor	?	South of England Championships
1885	(United Kingdom) Ernest Lewis	(United Kingdom) William Taylor	4–6, 7–5, 6–3, 6–3	South of England Championships
1886	(United Kingdom) Ernest Lewis (2)	(United Kingdom) Herbert Wilberforce *	6–3, 6–4, 6–0	South of England Championships
1887	(United Kingdom) Ernest Lewis (3)	(United Kingdom) Herbert Wilberforce *	8–6, 7–5, 6–4	South of England Championships
1888	(United Kingdom) Andrew Ziffo	(United Kingdom) Harry S. Barlow *	4–6, 6–2, 7–5, 6–3	South of England Championships
1889	(United Kingdom) Andrew Ziffo (2)	(United Kingdom) Harry Grove *	4–6, 6–3, 4–6, 9–7, 6–4	South of England Championships
1890	(United Kingdom) Andrew Ziffo (3)	(United Kingdom) James Baldwin *	7–9, 6–1, 6–2, 7–5	South of England Championships
1891	(United Kingdom) Harry S. Barlow	(United Kingdom) Andrew Ziffo *	6–3, 7–5, 6–0	South of England Championships
1892	(United Kingdom) Harry S. Barlow (2)	(United Kingdom) Wilberforce Eaves *	7–5, 2–6, 3–6, 6–3, 6–3	South of England Championships
1893	(England) Wilfred Baddeley	(United Kingdom) Harry S. Barlow *	7–5, 6–0, 6–1	South of England Championships
1894	(England) Wilfred Baddeley (2)	(United Kingdom) Harry S. Barlow *	6–3, 3–6, 6–3, 6–1	South of England Championships
1895	(England) Wilfred Baddeley (3)	(England) George Hillyard *	6–3, 7–9, 7–5, ret.	South of England Championships
1896	(England) Wilfred Baddeley (4)	(United Kingdom) Herbert Baddeley *	walkover	South of England Championships
1897	(Ireland) Joshua Pim	(England) Lawrence Doherty *	3–6, 6–3, 7–5, 6–3	South of England Championships
1898	(England) Sydney Howard Smith	(England) Lawrence Doherty *	6–3, 2–6, 8–6, 7–5	South of England Championships
1899	(England) Sydney Howard Smith (2)	(Ireland) Harold Mahony *	6–0, 6–3, 6–4	South of England Championships
1900	(England) Lawrence Doherty	(England) Sydney Howard Smith (2) *	6–4, 1–6, 6–2, 6–1	South of England Championships
1901	(England) Sydney Howard Smith (3)	(England) Lawrence Doherty *	6–3, 7–9, 4–6, 6–4, 1–0, ret.	South of England Championships
1902	(England) Sydney Howard Smith (4)	(United Kingdom) Clement Cazalet *	6–1, 3–6, 7–5, 6–4	South of England Championships
1903	(England) Major Ritchie	(England) Sydney Howard Smith *	?	South of England Championships
1904	(England) Sydney Howard Smith (5)	(England) Major Ritchie *	6–0, 6–4, 6–2	South of England Championships
1905	(Australia) Norman Brookes	(England) Sydney Howard Smith *	8–6, 6–4, 6–2	South of England Championships
1906	(New Zealand) Anthony Wilding	(United Kingdom) Roderick McNair *	6–2, 6–3, 6–2	South of England Championships
1907	(England) George Hillyard	(United Kingdom) Walter Crawley *	?	South of England Championships
1908	(New Zealand) Anthony Wilding (2)	(England) George Hillyard *	walkover	South of England Championships
1909	(Germany) Otto Froitzheim	(Germany) Friedrich Wilhelm Rahe	6–3, 6–8, 6–4, 7–5	South of England Championships
1910	(England) Gordon Lowe	(England) Arthur Lowe	walkover	South of England Championships
1911	(United Kingdom) Algernon Kingscote	(Australia) Stanley Doust	6–8, 4–6, 8–6, 6–0, 6–3	South of England Championships
1912	(England) Arthur Lowe	(Australia) Stanley Doust	6–4, 7–9, 6–0, 6–4	South of England Championships
1913	(Republic of Ireland) James Cecil Parke	(England) Arthur Lowe	6–3, 7–5, 2–6, 6–2	South of England Championships
1914–1918	Not held (due to world war one)			South of England Championships
1919	(United Kingdom) Theodore Mavrogordato	(Kingdom of Romania) Nicolae Mișu	6–3, 6–2, 6–4	South of England Championships
1920	(South Africa) George Dodd	(United Kingdom) Alfred Beamish	6–4, 6–1, 6–2	South of England Championships
1921	(South Africa) Brian Norton	(India) Mohammed Sleem	0–6, 6–4, 5–7, 6–2, 6–3	South of England Championships
1922	(South Africa) Brian Norton (2)	(England) Gordon Lowe	6–2, 2–6, 6–4, 6–3	South of England Championships
1923	(India) Cotah Ramaswami	(England) Gordon Lowe	6–1, 8–6, 10–8	South of England Championships
1924	(India) Mohammed Sleem	(England) Gordon Lowe	6–2, 6–1, 6–1	South of England Championships
1925	(United Kingdom) Charles Kingsley	(England) Gordon Lowe	4–6, 6–2, 6–3, 3–6, 6–2	South of England Championships
1926	(United Kingdom) Charles Kingsley (2)	(United Kingdom) Bunny Austin	walkover	South of England Championships
1927	(United Kingdom) Bunny Austin	(Wales) William Powell	6–4, 6–4	South of England Championships
1928	(Japan) Yoshiro Ota	(United Kingdom) Charles Kingsley	3–6, 6–1, 6–0	South of England Championships
1929	(New Zealand) Eskel Andrews	(United Kingdom) Keats Lester	6–4, 3–6, 6–4	South of England Championships
1930	(Japan) Ryuki Miki	(United Kingdom) Charles Kingsley	7–5, 6–3	South of England Championships
1931	(Japan) Jiro Sato	(South Africa) Vernon Kirby	6–4, 6–3	South of England Championships
1932	(Republic of Ireland) George Lyttleton-Rogers	(India) Atri Madan Mohan	6–8, 6–3, 6–4	South of England Championships
1933	(South Africa) Vernon Kirby	(Republic of Ireland) George Lyttleton-Rogers	8–6, 6–2	South of England Championships
1934	(United Kingdom) Nigel Sharpe	(New Zealand) Eskel Andrews	6–3, 6–3	South of England Championships
1935	(United Kingdom) Robert Tinkler	(United Kingdom) Clarence Medlycott Jones	8–6, 10–8	South of England Championships
1936	(United Kingdom) Pat Hughes	(United Kingdom) Charles Hare	2–6, 9–7, 6–1	South of England Championships
1937	(United Kingdom) Donald Butler	(United Kingdom) Henry Billington	6–3, 6–3	South of England Championships
1938	(United Kingdom) Donald Butler (2)	(United Kingdom) Clarence Medlycott Jones	6–4, 6–1	South of England Championships
1939–1945	Not held (due to world war two)			South of England Championships
1946	(United Kingdom) Donald Butler (3)	(Republic of China (1912–1949)) Choy Wai-Chuen	6–3, 6–4	South of England Championships
1947	(Poland) Ignacy Tłoczyński	(New Zealand) Jeff Robson	6–2, 6–3	South of England Championships
1948	(Poland) Czesław Spychała	(Poland) Ignacy Tłoczyński	5–7, 6–4, 8–6	South of England Championships
1949	(Argentina) Heraldo Weiss	(United Kingdom) Donald Butler	6–3, 6–2	South of England Championships
1950	(Netherlands) Ivo Rinkel	(United Kingdom) Geoffrey Paish	5–7, 7–5, 6–4	South of England Championships
1951	(United Kingdom) Geoffrey Paish	(United Kingdom) Tony Mottram	6–4, 4–6, 6–1	South of England Championships
1952	(United Kingdom) Geoffrey Paish (2)	(United Kingdom) Anthony Starte	4–6, 6–2, 6–1	South of England Championships
1953	(United Kingdom) Geoffrey Paish (3)	(United Kingdom) Robert Lee	7–5, 6–0	South of England Championships
1954	(United Kingdom) Geoffrey Paish (4)	(United Kingdom) Bobby Wilson	6–2, 2–6, 7–5	South of England Championships
1955	(United Kingdom) Geoffrey Paish (5)	(United Kingdom) Mike Davies	6–4, 6–4	South of England Championships
1956	(United Kingdom) Roger Becker	(United Kingdom) Gerald Oakley	6–3, 6–1	South of England Championships
1957	(United Kingdom) Reginald Bennett	(United Kingdom) Geoffrey Owen	6–3, 6–2	South of England Championships
1958	(United Kingdom) Roger Becker (2)	(United Kingdom) Reginald Bennett	6–3, 4–6, 6–1	South of England Championships
1959	(United Kingdom) Alan Mills	(United Kingdom) Mike Hann	8–6, 4–6, 6–3	South of England Championships
1960	(Australia) Mark Otway	(United Kingdom) John R. McDonald	6–4, 6–4	South of England Championships
1961	(Australia) Mark Otway (2)	(United Kingdom) Roger Becker	6–1, 4–6, 6–2	South of England Championships
1962	(United Kingdom) Roger Becker (3)	(United Kingdom) Mark Cox	4–6, 6–2, 6–4	South of England Championships
1963	(United Kingdom) Mark Cox	(Australia) Warren Jacques	1–6, 7–5, 6–2	South of England Championships
1964	(United Kingdom) Geoff Bluett	(United Kingdom) Clay Iles	6–3, 6–3	South of England Championships
1965	Tournament not completed (rain)			South of England Championships
1966	(South Africa) Bob Maud	(New Zealand) Brian Fairlie	6–4, 6–2	South of England Championships
1967	(South Africa) Frew McMillan	(United Kingdom) Mark Cox	6–3, 6–4	South of England Championships
↓ Open era ↓
1968	(United Kingdom) Mark Cox (2)	(Australia) Owen Davidson	6–4, 6–4	Rothmans Invitational
1969	(West Germany) Christian Kuhnke	(Spain) Manuel Orantes	6–4, 2–6, 9–7	Eastbourne Invitational
1970	(Australia) Ken Rosewall	(South Africa) Bob Hewitt	6–2, 6–1	Rothmans South of England Open Championship
1971	Tournament not played (rain)			Rothmans South of England Open Championship
1972	(Spain) Andrés Gimeno	(France) Pierre Barthès	7–5, 6–3	Rothmans South of England Open Championship
1973	(United Kingdom) Mark Cox (3)	(France) Patrice Dominguez	6–2, 2–6, 6–3	Rothmans South of England Open Championship
1974	Tournament ended			

== Statistics ==
=== Singles champions by country ===
==== Women ====
Country	Winner	First title	Last title
Great Britain (GBR)	70	1881	1970
United States (USA)	3	1919	1921
Australia (AUS)	2	1964	1969
South Africa (RSA)	1	1922	1922
Chile (CHI)	1	1936	1936
Brazil (BRA)	1	1968	1968
France (FRA)	2	1971	1972

==== Men ====
Country	Winner	First title	Last title
Great Britain (GBR)	49	1881	1973
South Africa (RSA)	6	1920	1967
New Zealand (NZ)	4	1905	1929
Ireland (IRE)	3	1897	1932
Japan (JPN)	3	1928	1931
Spain (ESP)	3	1972	2014
Germany (GER)	2	1909	1969
India (IND)	2	1923	1924
Poland (POL)	2	1947	1948
Argentina (ARG)	1	1949	1949
Netherlands (NED)	1	1950	1950
