= Charles Lacy Sweet =

British tennis player

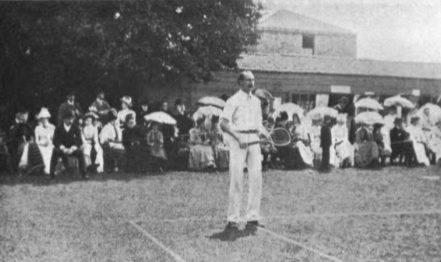
- Full name: Charles Lacy Sweet
- Country (sports): United Kingdom
- Born: 24 January 1861; Bristol, United Kingdom
- Died: 2 November 1892 (aged 31); Bristol, United Kingdom
- Turned pro: 1882 (amateur tour)
- Retired: 1892 (due to death)

Singles
- Career record: 115/41 (64.3%)
- Career titles: 11.

Grand Slam singles results
- Wimbledon: SF (1887)

Charles Lacy Sweet (1861–1892) was a British tennis player in the early years of Wimbledon. He was a semi finalist at the 1887 Wimbledon Championships – Men's singles. He was active for ten years from 1882 to 1892, and won 11 singles titles.

== Career ==
Lacy Sweet played in the Wimbledon singles three times. In 1887, Sweet reached the semifinals before handing Ernest Renshaw a walkover into the all comer's final. In 1888 Sweet lost his opening match to Herbert Wilberforce. In 1890 he lost in the opening round to David Chaytor.

His career singles successes include winning eleven tournaments between 1882 and 1892, the Cirencester Park Lawn Tennis Tournament (1882-1883), Exmouth Open (1884), (1882), Portishead Open Lawn Tennis Tournament (1883), Sussex County Lawn Tennis Tournament, East Grinstead Open, (1884), Clifton Open (1882, 1884, 1886), Taunton (1889) and the Boulogne International Championship on clay in 1890. Whilst his career doubles titles wins included the Mid Devon Lawn Tennis Tournament at Eggesford in 1883.

== Style of play ==
Herbert Chipp wrote the following about C. Lacy Sweet: "Lacy Sweet, to whom I have already referred, was another fine player. His style was a commanding one, and his game was marked by all-round excellence. Possessed of a powerful and accurate overhand service, a severe ground-stroke, formidable volleying and smashing powers, and great activity, he ought to have reached the very top of the tree. But from one cause or another he was never able to give that serious and unremitting attention to the game which successful tournament play exacts from its votaries. Consequently his performances, good though many of them were, never quite equalled the promise held out. He was very successful in Doubles with Ernest Renshaw. His death in 1892 was as unexpected as it was deeply regretted. For a more popular man the lawn tennis world did not possess".
