= Gloucestershire Championships =

Defunct tennis tournament
- Tour: ILTF
- Founded: 1881; 144 years ago
- Abolished: 1932; 93 years ago
- Location: Cheltenham; Clifton
- Surface: Clay; Grass

The Gloucestershire Championships also known as the Gloucestershire Lawn Tennis Championships was a combined men's and women's clay court then later grass court combined men's and women's tennis tournament founded in 1881 as the Gloucestershire Lawn Tennis Tournament. The tournament was first held in Cheltenham, Gloucestershire, England, but alternated venues throughout its run which ended in 1931.

== History ==
In 1881 an unofficial county tennis event the Gloucestershire Lawn Tennis Tournament was first held at Montpellier gardens, Cheltenham, Gloucestershire, England. In 1897 this tournament was revived and the name was changed to the Gloucestershire Lawn Tennis Association Tournament following the creation of Gloucestershire Lawn Tennis Association. and the tournament was moved to Clifton, Bristol as a replacement event for the Bristol and Clifton Open which was discontinued. In 1904 the tournament names was altered to the Gloucestershire Lawn Tennis Championships.

== Event name ==
- Gloucestershire Lawn Tennis Tournament (1881-1896)
- Gloucestershire Lawn Tennis Association Tournament (1897-1903)
- Gloucestershire Lawn Tennis Championships (1904-1920)
- Gloucestershire Championships (1921-1931)

== See also ==
- East Gloucestershire Championships
