= Donald Stewart (tennis) =

British tennis player

- Full name: Donald Charles Stewart
- Country (sports): United Kingdom
- Born: 12 December 1859; Notting Hill, London, United Kingdom
- Died: 13 September 1885 (aged 25); Lower Sherrington, Norfolk, United Kingdom
- Turned pro: 1882 (amateur tour)
- Retired: 1885 (due to death)

Singles
- Career record: 51–23 (68.9%)
- Career titles: 4

Grand Slam singles results
- Wimbledon: F (1883)

Donald Stewart (12 December 1859 – 13 September 1885) was a British tennis player active in the late 19th century. He was a singles finalist at the 1883 Wimbledon Championships, and won the singles title at the 1884 Northern Championships. Between 1882 and 1885 he won 4 career singles titles.

== Career ==
He played his first tournament at the Sussex Championships in April 1882 on indoor hard courts where he reached the final. Later that spring he reached the final of Sussex County Lawn Tennis Tournament at Brighton, but lost to Robert Braddell. In July 1882 he lost in the first round of Wimbledon to Richard Richardson. At Wimbledon 1883 Stewart beat Harry Grove, Claude Farrer, Herbert Wilberforce and William Taylor and then lost in the all comer's final to Ernest Renshaw (despite taking the first set 6–0). He won his first title at Cheltenham in June 1883, the same year he reached the final of the Sussex County Lawn Tennis Tournament spring event for the second time losing to Charles Walder Grinstead.

In June 1884 he won titles at Cheltenham and Waterloo in July at Wimbledon in 1884 he lost in the first round to Ernest Browne. In August 1884 Stewart won the prestigious Northern Championships at Liverpool in 1884 (beating Richard Sears, James Dwight, Ernest Browne and Herbert Wilberforce). In July 1885 Stewart lost an epic five set match to Ernest Renshaw in round one. In August he reached the finals of the Middlesex Championships at Chiswick before losing to Herbert Chipp, He played his last tournament at the Northern Championships in late August, as defending champion he lost in the challenge round to challenger James Dwight in straight sets. Stewart died aged 25 in 1885.

== Grand Slam finals ==
=== Singles (1 runner-up) ===
All-comers final

| Result | Year | Championship | Surface | Opponent | Score |
|---|---|---|---|---|---|
| Loss | 1883 | Wimbledon | Grass | (United Kingdom of Great Britain and Ireland) Ernest Renshaw | 6–0, 3–6, 0–6, 2–6 |
