= 1886 women's tennis season =

1886 Women's tennis season
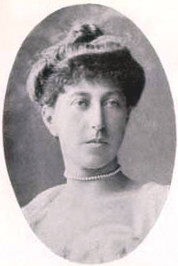
- Blanche Bingley wins Wimbledon, but May Langrishe is overall title leader.

Details
- Duration: 3 February – 30 December
- Edition: 11th
- Tournaments: 57
- Categories: Important (3); National (3); Provincial/Regional/State (12); County (8); Regular (31)

Achievements (singles)
- Most titles: (Ireland) May Langrishe (4)
- Most finals: (England) Maud Watson (6)

The 1886 Women's tennis season was a tennis circuit composed of 57 national, regional, county, and regular tournaments. The season began in February in London, England, and ended in December in Napier, New Zealand.

== Summary of season ==
From 1888 until 1912 Britain's Lawn Tennis Association (LTA), grew in status and influence to become the de facto international tennis governing body before the proper International Lawn Tennis Federation commenced operations. Despite the United States National Lawn Tennis Association (USNLTA) forming in 1881 a good seven years before the LTA, it was the British body that set laws, settled disputes and organized the increasingly complicated tournament calendar before the International Lawn Tennis Federation (ILTF) formed in March, 1913.

After the formation of the ILTF the world tennis circuit going forward was a highly organised and structured network of national and international tournaments. Most tennis tournaments were usually mixed events for men and women, and the women's international tennis circuit certainly up to 1923 was composed mainly of tournaments on the British and European Circuits. After the USNLTA joined the ILTF this would later change with more and more tournaments being staged globally. Women tennis players on the world circuit up to the open era were funded by their national associations enabling them to travel and take part in international tournaments.

1886 sees a decrease in the number women's singles events being held as the tennis circuit continues to form. The 1886 women's tennis season began on 3 February with the Hyde Park Court Covered Courts Tournament, London, Hyde Park Court. In May 1886 at the first major event of the year the Irish Championships played at the Fitzwilliam Lawn Tennis Club in Dublin, Ireland. Ireland's May Langrishe wins the singles title for her third and final title defeating the up-and-coming Louisa Martin, she also picks up the mixed doubles title with Eyre Chatterton. The ladies doubles event is won by Connie Butler and Louisa Martin. In terms of draw size the West of England Championships was the largest tournament of the year with a draw of 46 across three events.

In June 1886 at the second major tournament of the year, the Northern Championships played at the Liverpool Cricket Club in Liverpool, featured a full schedule of events the singles title going to Maud Watson defeating Lottie Dod in straights sets, the women's doubles event was won by the sister pairing of Ann Dod and Lottie Dod who defeat a Miss Cliff and May Langrishe in the final, the mixed doubles event is won by Margaret Bracewell and William Renshaw who defeat Lottie Dod and Harry Grove in the final.

In July at the 1886 Wimbledon Championships the world's first major tennis tournament, Blanche Bingley defeats two-time defending champion Maud Watson in straight sets to claim her first major title.

In August at the U.S. National Championships played on the outdoor Grass courts at the Newport Casino in Newport, Rhode Island there was still no women's championship events staged. The season ended on 30 December 1886 at the first New Zealand Championships, Napier, New Zealand played on grass.

== Season results ==
Prior to the creation of the International Lawn Tennis Federation and the establishment of its world championship events in 1913 the Wimbledon Championships, the U.S. National Championships, the Irish Lawn Tennis Championships and the Northern Championships were considered by players and historians as the four most important tennis tournaments to win.

Key

Important.
National
Provincial/State/Regional
County
Regular

=== January ===
No events

=== February ===
* (denotes doubles) ** (denotes mix doubles)

Ended	Tournament	Winner	Finalist	Semifinalist	Quarterfinalist
6 Feb.	Hyde Park Court Covered Courts Tournament; Hyde Park, England; Wood (i); Singles - Doubles	No Ladies Singles			
6 Feb.	Hyde Park Court Covered Courts Tournament; Hyde Park, England; Wood (i); Singles - Doubles	(England) Ethel Gurney ** (England) Herbert Chipp; 6–4, 4–6, 3–6, 6–3, 6–4	(England) Blanche Bingley (England) Harry Grove		

=== March ===
No events

=== April ===
No events

=== May ===
Ended	Tournament	Winner	Finalist	Semi finalist	Quarter finalist
1 May	Killiney and Ballybrack Championships; Ballybrack LTC; Killiney and Ballybrack; Killiney and Ballybrack, Ireland; Grass	(Ireland) May Langrishe; 6–4, 3–6, 6–1	(Ireland) Beatrice Langrishe		
15 May.	Inter-Colonial Lawn Tennis Tournament (Championship of New South Wales); Sydney, Australia; Asphalt; Singles - Doubles	(Australia) C. Greene; 6–3, 6–2	(Australia) Annie Lamb	(Australia) Eliza Fitzgerald (Australia)	(Australia) E Beamon (Australia) H Beaumont (Australia) Eva Rodd (Australia) Miss McLean
15 May.	Inter-Colonial Lawn Tennis Tournament (Championship of New South Wales); Sydney, Australia; Asphalt; Singles - Doubles	(Australia) Annie Lamb (Australia) C. Greene; 6–1, 6–4	(Australia) Beatrice Metcalfe (Australia) Eva Rodd	(Australia) Eliza Fitzgerald (Australia)	(Australia) E Beamon (Australia) H Beaumont (Australia) Eva Rodd (Australia) Miss McLean
15 May.	Inter-Colonial Lawn Tennis Tournament (Championship of New South Wales); Sydney, Australia; Asphalt; Singles - Doubles	(Australia) Zilla Scott (Australia) Louis Whyte; 6–1, 6–5	(Australia) Eliza Fitzgerald (Australia) Robert Fitzgerald	(Australia) Eliza Fitzgerald (Australia)	(Australia) E Beamon (Australia) H Beaumont (Australia) Eva Rodd (Australia) Miss McLean
22 May	West of Scotland Championships; Pollokshields, Scotland; Grass; Singles - Doubles	(Scotland) Jane Meikle; 6–4, 5–7, 6–0	(Scotland) Julia MacKenzie		
22 May	West of Scotland Championships; Pollokshields, Scotland; Grass; Singles - Doubles	(Scotland) Jane Meikle (England) Walter Chamberlain; 6–1, 6–2	(Scotland) Julia MacKenzie (Scotland) John Galbraith Horn		
29 May.	Irish Championships; Fitzwilliam LTC; Dublin, Ireland; Grass; Singles - Doubles	(Ireland) May Langrishe; 6–3, 6–4	(Ireland) Louisa Martin	(Ireland) Connie Butler (Ireland) Beatrice Langrishe	(Ireland) Mabel Cahill (Ireland) Miss Exham (Ireland) Miss Hodson (Ireland) Adela Langrishe
29 May.	Irish Championships; Fitzwilliam LTC; Dublin, Ireland; Grass; Singles - Doubles	(Ireland) Connie Butler (Ireland) Louisa Martin; 6–3, 6–4	(Ireland) Beatrice Langrishe (Ireland) May Langrishe	(Ireland) Connie Butler (Ireland) Beatrice Langrishe	(Ireland) Mabel Cahill (Ireland) Miss Exham (Ireland) Miss Hodson (Ireland) Adela Langrishe
29 May.	Irish Championships; Fitzwilliam LTC; Dublin, Ireland; Grass; Singles - Doubles	(Ireland) May Langrishe (Ireland) Eyre Chatterton; 6–0, 6–2, 6–1	(Ireland) Adela Langrishe (Ireland) Toler Roberts Garvey	(Ireland) Connie Butler (Ireland) Beatrice Langrishe	(Ireland) Mabel Cahill (Ireland) Miss Exham (Ireland) Miss Hodson (Ireland) Adela Langrishe

=== June ===
Ended	Tournament	Winner	Finalist	Semi finalist	Quarter finalist
3 June.	Championship of West of England; Lansdowne Cricket Club; Bath, England; Grass; Singles - Doubles	(England) Lottie Dod; 6–1, 6–2	(England) Maud Watson	(England) F. Burton (Ireland) Louisa Martin	(England) Blanche Bingley (Ireland) Connie Butler (England) Edith Davies (England) N. Pope
4 Jun	Whitehouse Open; Whitehouse LTC; Edinburgh, Scotland; Clay; Singles - Doubles	(Scotland) Jane Meikle; 6–2, 6–2	(Scotland) Miss Meikle		
4 Jun	Whitehouse Open; Whitehouse LTC; Edinburgh, Scotland; Clay; Singles - Doubles	(Scotland) J. Ferguson (Scotland) A. Steel; 6–3, 6–2	(Scotland) E. Ferguson (Scotland) W. Ferguson		
5 June.	Beckenham Cricket Club Tournament; Beckenham, England; Grass; Singles - Doubles	No Ladies Singles	No Ladies Doubles		
5 June.	Beckenham Cricket Club Tournament; Beckenham, England; Grass; Singles - Doubles	(England) Ellen Wilson ** (England) Edward J. Avory; 9–7, 6–1	(England) Miss Wing (England) J.E. Passmore		
13 Jun	East Gloucestershire Championship Challenge Cup; Cheltenham LTC; Cheltenham, England; Singles - Doubles	(Ireland) Louisa Martin; 6–4, 6–4	(England) Maud Watson	(United Kingdom) Margaret Bracewell (England) Blanche Bingley	(England) Constance Bryan (England) Lottie Dod (England) Edith Gurney (Ireland) Beatrice Langrishe
13 Jun	East Gloucestershire Championship Challenge Cup; Cheltenham LTC; Cheltenham, England; Singles - Doubles	(United Kingdom) Margaret Bracewell (England) William Renshaw; 6–4, 6–4	(England) Blanche Bingley (United States) James Dwight	(United Kingdom) Margaret Bracewell (England) Blanche Bingley	(England) Constance Bryan (England) Lottie Dod (England) Edith Gurney (Ireland) Beatrice Langrishe
16 Jun.	Welsh Championships; Penarth LTC; Penarth, Wales; Singles - Doubles	(Wales) L. Browne; 4–6, 6–1, 6–3	(England) L.C. Stephens	(Wales) A. Reynolds (Wales) M. Reynolds	(England) Mrs Hill (England) Miss Norton (Wales) E.J. Stephens (England) B. Trayes
19 Jun	Scottish Championships; Edinburgh University Club; Edinburgh, Scotland; Grass; Singles - Doubles	(England) Mabel Boulton; 3–6, 6–0, 6–2, 4–6 6-2	(Scotland) Julia MacKenzie	(Scotland) J. Ferguson (Scotland) Miss Meikle	(Scotland) E. Ferguson (Scotland) Jane Meikle (Scotland) Miss MacKenzie
19 Jun	London Championships; London Athletic Club; London, England; Grass; Singles - Doubles	(England) Blanche Bingley; 6–1, 6–1	(England) Edith Davies	(England) Edith Gurney (England) B. Hannaford	
24 Jun	Badsworth Hunt Tournament; Ackworth House; Pontefract, England; Grass; Singles - Doubles	(England) Beatrice Wood; 6–0, 6–0	(England) Miss Smith		
24 Jun	Redhill Open Lawn Tennis Tournament; Redhill, England; Grass; Singles - Doubles	(United Kingdom) J. Wray; 6–1, 6–2	(United Kingdom) Miss Wing		
26 Jun	Warriston Park LTC Tournament; Edinburgh, Scotland; Grass; Singles - Doubles	(Scotland) Jane Meikle; 5–7, 6–1, 6–1	(England) Mabel Boulton		
26 Jun	Clifton Open; Clifton, England; Singles - Doubles	(Ireland) Beatrice Langrishe; 6–2, 7–5	(England) N Pope	(England) Clara Hill (England) Margaret Fyffe	(England) Miss Bryant (England) Gratian Fyffe (England) Marian Fyffe (England) A. James
26 Jun	Clifton Open; Clifton, England; Singles - Doubles	(England) N Pope (England) James Baldwin; 8–6, 6–4	(England) Clara Hill (England) John Charles Kay	(England) Clara Hill (England) Margaret Fyffe	(England) Miss Bryant (England) Gratian Fyffe (England) Marian Fyffe (England) A. James
30 June.	Northern Championships; Liverpool Cricket Club; Liverpool, England; Grass; Singles - Doubles	(England) Maud Watson; 6–3, 9–7	(England) (England) Lottie Dod	(England) Miss L Cheetham (England) Emily Fletcher	(England) N. Garnett (England) A. McLaren (Scotland) B. McLaren (England) K. Mitchell
30 June.	Northern Championships; Liverpool Cricket Club; Liverpool, England; Grass; Singles - Doubles	(England) Ann Dod (England) Lottie Dod; 6–3, 9–7	(England) Miss Cliff (Ireland) May Langrishe	(England) Miss L Cheetham (England) Emily Fletcher	(England) N. Garnett (England) A. McLaren (Scotland) B. McLaren (England) K. Mitchell

=== July ===
Ended	Tournament	Winner	Finalist	Semi finalist	Quarter finalist
2 Jul	Edgbaston Open Tournament; Edgbaston CLTC; Edgbaston, England; Grass; Singles - Doubles	(United Kingdom) Margaret Bracewell; 6–2, 6–2	(England) Maud Watson		
2 Jul	Midland Counties Championships; Edgbaston CLTC; Edgbaston, England; Grass; Singles - Doubles	(England) Blanche Bingley; 6–2, 6–2	(England) Lillian Watson	(England) Miss Noon (England) F. Lawrence	(United Kingdom) Margaret Bracewell (United Kingdom) Bertha Steedman (United Kingdom) Eva Steedman (United Kingdom) Mary Steedman
2 Jul	Midland Counties Championships; Edgbaston CLTC; Edgbaston, England; Grass; Singles - Doubles	(England) Blanche Bingley (England) Lilian Watson; 6–4, 6–2	(United Kingdom) Bertha Steedman (United Kingdom) Mary Steedman	(England) Miss Noon (England) F. Lawrence	(United Kingdom) Margaret Bracewell (United Kingdom) Bertha Steedman (United Kingdom) Eva Steedman (United Kingdom) Mary Steedman
2 Jul	Midland Counties Championships; Edgbaston CLTC; Edgbaston, England; Grass; Singles - Doubles	(England) Maud Watson (England) John Redfern Deykin; 7–5, 6–1, 4–6, 2–6, 8–6	(United Kingdom) Margaret Bracewellll (England) William Renshaw	(England) Miss Noon (England) F. Lawrence	(United Kingdom) Margaret Bracewell (United Kingdom) Bertha Steedman (United Kingdom) Eva Steedman (United Kingdom) Mary Steedman
3 Jul	Staffordshire Lawn Tennis Tournament; Stafford Institute LTC; Stafford, England; Grass; Singles - Doubles	(United Kingdom) Agnes Noon; 2–6, 6–4, 6–2	(United Kingdom) Barbara Noon		
3 Jul	Northumberland Cricket Club Open. Newcastle upon Tyne, England; Grass; Singles - Doubles	No Ladies Singles			
3 Jul	Northumberland Cricket Club Open. Newcastle upon Tyne, England; Grass; Singles - Doubles	(United Kingdom) Alice Cheese (England) E. Cheese; 6–1, 2–6, 11–9	(Ireland) Connie Butler (England) Miss Marley		
3 Jul	Northumberland Cricket Club Open. Newcastle upon Tyne, England; Grass; Singles - Doubles	(Ireland) Connie Butler (England) Charles Liddle; 6–4, 4–6, 8–6	(England) Miss Marley (England) Kenneth Ramsden Marley		
3 Jul	Natal Championships; Pietermaritzburg, Natal Colony; Grass; Singles - Doubles	(Colony of Natal) Mabel Grant; 6–3, 6–2	(Colony of Natal) L. Button		
10 Jul.	Broughty Ferry Open; Broughty Ferry LTC; Broughty Ferry, Scotland; Clay; Singles - Doubles	No Ladies Singles	No Ladies Doubles		
10 Jul.	Broughty Ferry Open; Broughty Ferry LTC; Broughty Ferry, Scotland; Clay; Singles - Doubles	(England) Arthur Neville John Story (Scotland) Miss Aileen Malcom; 6–3, 6–2	(Scotland) Archibald Thomson (United Kingdom) Miss. Daphne Hay		
10 Jul.	Claremount Park Open. Claremont Park Public Lawn Tennis Grounds; Blackpool, England. Grass; Singles - Doubles	No Ladies Singles	No Ladies Doubles		
10 Jul.	Claremount Park Open. Claremont Park Public Lawn Tennis Grounds; Blackpool, England. Grass; Singles - Doubles	(United Kingdom) Walter Reid Craig (United Kingdom) Miss Rose Viener; 6–3, 4–6, 6–2	(United Kingdom) Montagu Howarth (United Kingdom) Miss. Rebecca Moore		
12 Jul.	Chapel Allerton LTC Tournament; Chapel Allerton LTC; Chapel Allerton, England; Grass; Singles - Doubles	(United Kingdom) Louisa Moir; 6–3, 5–6, 6–5	(United Kingdom) Isabel Tannett		
12 Jul.	Chapel Allerton LTC Tournament; Chapel Allerton LTC; Chapel Allerton, England; Grass; Singles - Doubles	(England) Beatrice Wood (England) Arthur Meysey-Thompson; 6–5, 6–2	(England) Mrs Carpenter (England) Cedric F. Palmer		
12 Jul.	Ilkley Open Tournament; Ilkley LTC; Ilkley, England; Grass; Singles - Doubles	(England) Beatrice Wood; 3–6, 6–5, 6–0	(United Kingdom) Jean Moir		
15 Jul.	Burton-on-Trent Open; Burton upon Trent, England; Grass; Singles - Doubles	No Ladies Singles	No Ladies Doubles		
15 Jul.	Burton-on-Trent Open; Burton upon Trent, England; Grass; Singles - Doubles	(United Kingdom) F.A. Clark (England) Miss Denton; 6–4, 4–6, 8–6	(United Kingdom) Frank Noon (England) Mrs Hodson		
15 Jul.	Mersey Bowmen Club Tournament; Aigburth, England; Grass; Singles - Doubles	(England) Katharine Hill; 6–5, 6–3	(England) Jane Pickthall	(Ireland) Mary McConnell (England) Catherine Jones	
16 Jul.	Chiswick Park Club Open Lawn Tennis Tournament; Chiswick, England; Grass; Singles - Doubles	(England) Miss Douglas; 6–4, 6–0	(England) May Jacks	(England) Blanche Bingley (Ireland) Lena Rice	
16 Jul.	Chiswick Park Club Open Lawn Tennis Tournament; Chiswick, England; Grass; Singles - Doubles	(England) Blanche Bingley (England) William Renshaw; 7–5, 6–1	(United Kingdom) May Jacks (England) William Taylor	(England) Blanche Bingley (Ireland) Lena Rice	
17 Jul.	Wimbledon Championships; AELTC; London, England; Outdoor; Grass; Singles - Doubles	(England) Blanche Bingley; 6–3, 6–3	(England) Maud Watson	(United Kingdom) Amy Tabor (England) Lilian Watson	(United Kingdom) AM Chambers (United Kingdom) Julia Mackenzie (United Kingdom) FM Pearson (United Kingdom) J Shackle
22 Jul	Taunton and West Somerset Lawn Tennis Tournament; Taunton, England; Grass; Singles - Doubles	(United Kingdom) Nora Pope; 6–1, 6–2	(United Kingdom) Alice Bagnall-Wild	(England) Georgina Gilling-Lax (England) Miss Woodhouse	(England) Beatrice Adey (England) Miss Chapman (England) Ada Meyler (England) Constance Meyler
22 Jul	Taunton and West Somerset Lawn Tennis Tournament; Taunton, England; Grass; Singles - Doubles	(United Kingdom) Alice Bagnall-Wild (United Kingdom) Nora Pope; 6–2, 6–0	(England) Miss Escott (England) Georgina Gilling-Lax	(England) Georgina Gilling-Lax (England) Miss Woodhouse	(England) Beatrice Adey (England) Miss Chapman (England) Ada Meyler (England) Constance Meyler
24 Jul.	Kilkenny County and City Tournament; Kilkenny, Ireland; Grass; Singles - Doubles	(Ireland) Mabel Cahill; 7–5, 6–2, 6–4	(Ireland) Beatrice Langrishe	(Ireland) Miss Kenealy	(Ireland) Miss Butler (Ireland) Adela Langrishe
24 Jul.	Kilkenny County and City Tournament; Kilkenny, Ireland; Grass; Singles - Doubles	(Ireland) May Langrishe (Ireland) Ernest Brown; 6–1, 6–1, 6–1	(Ireland) Mabel Cahill (Ireland) Francis Swayne	(Ireland) Miss Kenealy	(Ireland) Miss Butler (Ireland) Adela Langrishe
24 Jul.	Ealing Championships; Ealing LTC; Ealing, England; Grass; Singles - Doubles	(United Kingdom) Charlotte Cooper; 6–4, 5–7, 6–4	(United Kingdom) Alice Brown	(United Kingdom) Edith Gurney (United Kingdom) Bertha Steedman	
24 Jul.	South of Ireland Championships. Limerick, Ireland; Grass; Singles	(Ireland) Miss Smith; 6–1, 6–4	(Ireland) G. Bailey	(Ireland) Mary Lysaght (England) Mildred Smith	
24 Jul.	South of Ireland Championships. Limerick, Ireland; Grass; Singles	(Ireland) Mary Lysaght (Ireland) William Bredin; 6–5, 5–6, 6–2, 6–5	(Ireland) Miss Gloster (Ireland) Edward Westropp	(Ireland) Mary Lysaght (England) Mildred Smith	
24 Jul.	Leicester Open Lawn Tennis Tournament; Leicester, England; Grass; Singles - Doubles	(United Kingdom) Agnes Watts (United Kingdom) Florence Noon title divided		(England) Florence Mardall (United Kingdom) Effie Noon	(United Kingdom) Mrs Hill (United Kingdom) L. Snook (United Kingdom) Miss Snook (United Kingdom) Miss Hudson
24 Jul.	Leicester Open Lawn Tennis Tournament; Leicester, England; Grass; Singles - Doubles	(England) Florence Mardall (United Kingdom) Agnes Watts; 6–2, 6–0	(England) Miss Lorrimer (United Kingdom) Miss Snook	(England) Florence Mardall (United Kingdom) Effie Noon	(United Kingdom) Mrs Hill (United Kingdom) L. Snook (United Kingdom) Miss Snook (United Kingdom) Miss Hudson
24 Jul.	Leicester Open Lawn Tennis Tournament; Leicester, England; Grass; Singles - Doubles	(United Kingdom) Florence Noon (United Kingdom) Frank Noon; 6–3, 6–2	(England) Florence Mardall (England) William N. Cobbold	(England) Florence Mardall (United Kingdom) Effie Noon	(United Kingdom) Mrs Hill (United Kingdom) L. Snook (United Kingdom) Miss Snook (United Kingdom) Miss Hudson
28 Jul.	Leamington Open Tournament; Leamington Spa, England; Grass; Singles - Doubles	(United Kingdom) Gertrude Mellersh; 6–4, 6–4	(United Kingdom) Margaret Bracewell		
28 Jul.	Leamington Open Tournament; Leamington Spa, England; Grass; Singles - Doubles	(United Kingdom) Mrs Hornby (United Kingdom) Charles Ross; 6–2, 6–3	(United Kingdom) Gertrude Mellersh (United Kingdom) Thomas Mellersh		
31 Jul.	Northumberland County Association Tournament; Newcastle upon Tyne, England; Grass; Singles - Doubles	No Ladies Singles			
31 Jul.	Northumberland County Association Tournament; Newcastle upon Tyne, England; Grass; Singles - Doubles	(Ireland) Connie Butler (England) Miss A. Clayton; 6–1, 2–6, 11–9	(England) Mrs R. Clayton (England) Winifred Fenwick		
31 Jul.	Northumberland County Association Tournament; Newcastle upon Tyne, England; Grass; Singles - Doubles	(England) Miss A. Clayton (Scotland) Patrick Bowes-Lyon; 6–4, 4–6, 8–6	(Ireland) Connie Butler (England) Charles Liddle		

=== August ===
Ended	Tournament	Winner	Finalist	Semi finalist	Quarter finalist
2 Aug	East of Ireland Championships; Howth LTC; Howth, Ireland; Grass; Singles - Doubles	(Ireland) May Langrishe; 6–3, 6–2	(Ireland) Isabella Smyth	(Ireland) Noeleen Boyle (England) Agnes Moore	(Ireland) Ada Atthill (England) Elizabeth Crofton (Ireland) Jane McClintock (England) Ida Perry
6 Aug	Darlington Association Tournament; Darlington, England; Singles - Doubles	(Ireland) Florence Stanuell; 6–2, 6–2	(United Kingdom) Beatrice Wood	(Ireland) Connie Butler (England) Mrs J.T. Proud	
6 Aug	Darlington Association Tournament; Darlington, England; Singles - Doubles	(Ireland) Connie Butler (Ireland) Florence Stanuell; 6–4, 6–3	(United Kingdom) Miss Langley (United Kingdom) Ethel Surtees	(Ireland) Connie Butler (England) Mrs J.T. Proud	
6 Aug	Darlington Association Tournament; Darlington, England; Singles - Doubles	(Ireland) Florence Stanuell (Scotland) Patrick Bowes-Lyon; 6–1, 7–5	(Ireland) Connie Butler (Scotland) John Galbraith Horn	(Ireland) Connie Butler (England) Mrs J.T. Proud	
7 Aug	Exmouth Lawn Tennis Club Tournament; Exmouth, England; Grass; Singles - Doubles	(England) Maud Watson; 7–5, 0–6, 6–3	(England) Blanche Bingley	(England) Constance Bryan (England) Katherine Hole	(England) Katharine Kindersley (England) Leila Lodwick (England) Lilian Watson
7 Aug	Exmouth Lawn Tennis Club Tournament; Exmouth, England; Grass; Singles - Doubles	(England) Blanche Bingley (England) William Renshaw; 5–7, 7–5, 8–6	(England) Maud Watson (England) John Redfern Deykin	(England) Constance Bryan (England) Katherine Hole	(England) Katharine Kindersley (England) Leila Lodwick (England) Lilian Watson
7 Aug	Hull Westbourne Avenue Open Tournament; Hull, England; Grass; Singles - Doubles	(United Kingdom) Constance Hodgson; 7–5, 0–6, 6–3	(United Kingdom) Miss Alfrey		
7 Aug	Hull Westbourne Avenue Open Tournament; Hull, England; Grass; Singles - Doubles	(England) Dorothy Boulton (England) Mabel Boulton; 6–3, 6–3	(England) Constance Hodgson (England) Mrs Travers		
7 Aug	Hull Westbourne Avenue Open Tournament; Hull, England; Grass; Singles - Doubles	(England) Mabel Boulton (England) F.J. Hirst; 6–3, 6–3	(England) A. Thorney (England) A.W. McIlwaine		
7 Aug	Waterford Open Tournament; Waterford Cricket Club; Waterford, Ireland; Grass; Singles	(Ireland) May Langrishe; 6–2, 6–1	(Ireland) Ann Gallwey	(Ireland) Mabel Cahill (Ireland) Beatrice Langrishe	(Ireland) Frances Gallwey (Ireland) Miss Knox
7 Aug	County Wexford Club Tournament; County Wexford LTC; Wexford Ireland; Grass; Singles	(Ireland) H. Esmonde; 2–6, 6–4, 6–2	(Ireland) H.E. Moffat	(Ireland) Miss Brunskill (Ireland) K. Doran	(Ireland) Miss Beatty (Ireland) E. Doran
11 Aug	East Grinstead Lawn Tennis Tournament; East Grinstead, England; Grass; Singles - Doubles	(United Kingdom) Miss Cobbold; 3-6 6-1 6-1	(United Kingdom) May Jacks		
11 Aug	East Grinstead Lawn Tennis Tournament; East Grinstead, England; Grass; Singles - Doubles	(England) May Arbuthnot (United Kingdom) Miss Cobbold; 6-4 6-3	(United Kingdom) Miss Bird (United Kingdom) Miss Saint-Clair		
11 Aug	East Grinstead Lawn Tennis Tournament; East Grinstead, England; Grass; Singles - Doubles	(United Kingdom) Miss Cobbold (United Kingdom) William N. Cobbold; 6-2 6-0	(England) May Jacks (United Kingdom) Herbert Hockney		
14 Aug	North of England Championships; South Cliff LTC; Scarborough, England; Grass; Singles - Doubles	(United Kingdom) Margaret Bracewell; 6-4 8-6	(United Kingdom) Mabel Boulton	(England) L. Brown (England) Mrs W. Hill	(England) Florence Mardall (England) E. Robinson (United Kingdom) Miss Robinson (England) Miss Young
14 Aug	North of England Championships; South Cliff LTC; Scarborough, England; Grass; Singles - Doubles	(United Kingdom) Margaret Bracewell (England) Florence Mardall; 8-6 4-6 6-4	(United Kingdom) E. Atkinson (United Kingdom) E. Rawlinson	(England) L. Brown (England) Mrs W. Hill	(England) Florence Mardall (England) E. Robinson (United Kingdom) Miss Robinson (England) Miss Young
14 Aug	North of England Championships; South Cliff LTC; Scarborough, England; Grass; Singles - Doubles	(United Kingdom) Margaret Bracewell (United Kingdom) Harry Grove; 6-0 6-3	(United Kingdom) Mrs Hill (United Kingdom) J.H. Aitken	(England) L. Brown (England) Mrs W. Hill	(England) Florence Mardall (England) E. Robinson (United Kingdom) Miss Robinson (England) Miss Young
14 Aug	Teignmouth and Shaldon Open; Teignmouth, England; Grass; Singles - Doubles	(England) Lillian Watson (England) Maud Watson divided tile			
14 Aug	Teignmouth and Shaldon Open; Teignmouth, England; Grass; Singles - Doubles	(England) Lillian Watson (England) John Redfern Deykin; 6–1, 6–4	(England) J. Wray (England) Charles Pine-Coffin		
16 Aug	Felixstowe Open Lawn Tennis Tournament. Felixstowe, England; Singles - Doubles	(United Kingdom) A. Ridley; 6–1, 6–5	(United Kingdom) Helen Kersey		
19 Aug	Saxmundham LTC Tournament; Saxmundham, England; Grass; Singles - Doubles	(United Kingdom) G. Rant; 6-4, 6-5	(United Kingdom) A. Forster		
19 Aug	Saxmundham LTC Tournament; Saxmundham, England; Grass; Singles - Doubles	(United Kingdom) G. Rant (United Kingdom) Mrs Warwick; 6-3 6-1	(United Kingdom) Mabel Lowther (United Kingdom) May Lowther		
19 Aug	Saxmundham LTC Tournament; Saxmundham, England; Grass; Singles - Doubles	(United Kingdom) Kate Barkley (United Kingdom) R.G. Pollock; 6-4 6-1	(United Kingdom) Miss Bond (United Kingdom) Herbert Longe		
21 Aug	South Wales and Monmouthshire Championships; Tenby, Wales; Grass; Singles - Doubles	(United Kingdom) Katherine Hill; 6-4 6-3	(United Kingdom) Mary Agg		
21 Aug	South Wales and Monmouthshire Championships; Tenby, Wales; Grass; Singles - Doubles	(United Kingdom) Mary Agg (United Kingdom) B. Henry; 6-2 6-2	(United Kingdom) V. Hardy (United Kingdom) C. Jones		
21 Aug	South Wales and Monmouthshire Championships; Tenby, Wales; Grass; Singles - Doubles	(United Kingdom) Mary Agg (United Kingdom) James Baldwin; 6-3 6-3	(United Kingdom) C. Jones (United Kingdom) E.W. David		
21 Aug	Yorkshire Lawn Tennis Tournament; Harrogate, England; Grass; Singles - Doubles	(United Kingdom) Margaret Bracewell; 5-7 8-6 3-0 retd.	(United Kingdom) Mabel Boulton	(England) Constance Hodgson (England) Florence Mardall	(United Kingdom) Ethel Atkinson (England) M. Crossley (England) Miss Willett (England) Beatrice Wood
21 Aug	Yorkshire Lawn Tennis Tournament; Harrogate, England; Grass; Singles - Doubles	(United Kingdom) Margaret Bracewell (England) Florence Mardall; 6-2 6-1	(United Kingdom) E. Atkinson (United Kingdom) Ella Rawlinson	(England) Constance Hodgson (England) Florence Mardall	(United Kingdom) Ethel Atkinson (England) M. Crossley (England) Miss Willett (England) Beatrice Wood
21 Aug	Yorkshire Lawn Tennis Tournament; Harrogate, England; Grass; Singles - Doubles	(United Kingdom) Mabel Boulton (United Kingdom) B. Hartley; 6-4 6-4	(United Kingdom) Mrs W Hill (Scotland) John Galbraith Horn	(England) Constance Hodgson (England) Florence Mardall	(United Kingdom) Ethel Atkinson (England) M. Crossley (England) Miss Willett (England) Beatrice Wood
23 Aug	South of Scotland Championships; Beechgrove LTC; Moffat, Scotland; Grass; Singles - Doubles	(England) Ann Dod; 6–3, 6–2	(Scotland) Evelyn Blencowe	(Scotland) Lottie Paterson	(Scotland) A. Barry (Scotland) Ada Blencowe (Ireland) Jane McClintock (England) Ida Perry
23 Aug	South of Scotland Championships; Beechgrove LTC; Moffat, Scotland; Grass; Singles - Doubles	(Scotland) Ada Blencowe (Scotland) Evelyn Blencowe; 7–5, 4–6, 6–1	(England) Ann Dod (Scotland) Miss Thomson	(Scotland) Lottie Paterson	(Scotland) A. Barry (Scotland) Ada Blencowe (Ireland) Jane McClintock (England) Ida Perry
23 Aug	South of Scotland Championships; Beechgrove LTC; Moffat, Scotland; Grass; Singles - Doubles	(Scotland) Lottie Paterson (Ireland) Edward B. Morrison; 9–7, 7–5	(England) Ann Dod (Scotland) Richard Millar Watson	(Scotland) Lottie Paterson	(Scotland) A. Barry (Scotland) Ada Blencowe (Ireland) Jane McClintock (England) Ida Perry
26 Aug	Helmingham Invitation; Helmingham Estate; Helmingham, England; Grass; Singles - Doubles	No Ladies Singles	No Ladies Doubles		
26 Aug	Helmingham Invitation; Helmingham Estate; Helmingham, England; Grass; Singles - Doubles	(England) Miss Austin (England) Mr Wood; 6–2, 6–0	(England) Miss Heasey (France) Mr Addisou		
28 Aug	Derbyshire Championships; Buxton, England; Grass; Singles - Doubles	(Ireland) Louisa Martin; 6–3, 6–0	(Ireland) May Langrishe	(England) Blanche Bingley (England) Mary Steedman	(England) Lottie Dod (England) Florence Mardall (England) E. Richardson (Ireland) Florence Stanuell
28 Aug	Derbyshire Championships; Buxton, England; Grass; Singles - Doubles	(England) Lottie Dod (Ireland) May Langrishe; 6–2, 7–5	(Ireland) Louisa Martin (Ireland) Florence Stanuell	(England) Blanche Bingley (England) Mary Steedman	(England) Lottie Dod (England) Florence Mardall (England) E. Richardson (Ireland) Florence Stanuell
28 Aug	Derbyshire Championships; Buxton, England; Grass; Singles - Doubles	(Ireland) Louisa Martin (Ireland) Tom Campion; 6–3, 4–6, 6–2	(England) Alice Noon (United Kingdom) P. B. Brown	(England) Blanche Bingley (England) Mary Steedman	(England) Lottie Dod (England) Florence Mardall (England) E. Richardson (Ireland) Florence Stanuell
29 Aug	Bournemouth Lawn Tennis Club Tournament; Dean Park; Bournemouth, England; Grass; Singles - Doubles	(United Kingdom) Mrs Hornby; 6–3, 6–3	(United Kingdom) B. Hannaford	(England) L. Elphinston (United Kingdom) Mrs Surman	(England) M. Elphinston (United Kingdom) Miss Fryer (United Kingdom) Miss Vaughan (United Kingdom) Miss Wollaston
29 Aug	Bournemouth Lawn Tennis Club Tournament; Dean Park; Bournemouth, England; Grass; Singles - Doubles	(United Kingdom) Miss Vaughan (United Kingdom) Leslie C. Wintle; 6–2, 6–3	(United Kingdom) Miss Palmer (United Kingdom) D.W. Donaldson	(England) L. Elphinston (United Kingdom) Mrs Surman	(England) M. Elphinston (United Kingdom) Miss Fryer (United Kingdom) Miss Vaughan (United Kingdom) Miss Wollaston
30 Aug	Whitby Open Lawn Tennis Tournament; Whitby, England; Grass; Singles - Doubles	(United Kingdom) G. Walters walkover	(United Kingdom) Beatrice Wood		
30 Aug	Whitby Open Lawn Tennis Tournament; Whitby, England; Grass; Singles - Doubles	(United Kingdom) A. Walters (United Kingdom) G. Walters; 6–2, 6–2	(United Kingdom) Miss Wilkins (United Kingdom) E. Wilkins		
30 Aug	Whitby Open Lawn Tennis Tournament; Whitby, England; Grass; Singles - Doubles	(United Kingdom) Mabel Hartley (United Kingdom) George E. Brewerton; 6–4, 6–3	(United Kingdom) L. Cheetham (United Kingdom) Arthur G. Pease		

=== September ===
Ended	Tournament	Winner	Finalist	Semi finalist	Quarter finalist
7 Sep	South of England Championships; Eastbourne, England; Grass; Singles - Doubles	(United Kingdom) Margaret Bracewell; 6–1, 6–3	(England) Blanche Bingley	(England) Florence Mardall (England) Laura Triscott	(England) E. Malcolm (England) E. Monckton (England) Mrs Kate Tullock (England) Alice Strapp
7 Sep	South of England Championships; Eastbourne, England; Grass; Singles - Doubles	(United Kingdom) Margaret Bracewell (England) Florence Mardall; 6–4, 6–3	(United Kingdom) Gertrude Mellersh (United Kingdom) Elizabeth Mocatta	(England) Florence Mardall (England) Laura Triscott	(England) E. Malcolm (England) E. Monckton (England) Mrs Kate Tullock (England) Alice Strapp
7 Sep	South of England Championships; Eastbourne, England; Grass; Singles - Doubles	(United Kingdom) Margaret Bracewell (Scotland) John Galbraith Hornn; 6–4, 8–6	(England) Florence Mardall (United Kingdom) Percy B. Brown	(England) Florence Mardall (England) Laura Triscott	(England) E. Malcolm (England) E. Monckton (England) Mrs Kate Tullock (England) Alice Strapp

=== October ===
Ended	Tournament	Winner	Finalist	Semi finalist	Quarter finalist
19 Oct	New Haven Ladies Tournament; New Haven LTC; New Haven, United States; Grass; Singles - Doubles	(United States) Miss Leslie; 6–1, 6–4	(United States) Annie Miller	(United States) Miss Griggs (United States) Miss Kellogg	(United States) Miss L. Ives (United States) Miss Lynch (United States) N. B. Trowbridge (United States) Martha White
19 Oct	New Haven Ladies Tournament; New Haven LTC; New Haven, United States; Grass; Singles - Doubles	(United States) Miss Lente (United States) N. B. Trowbridge; 6–1, 6–3	(United States) Miss Briggs (United States) Miss Kellogg	(United States) Miss Griggs (United States) Miss Kellogg	(United States) Miss L. Ives (United States) Miss Lynch (United States) N. B. Trowbridge (United States) Martha White
29 Oct	Victorian Championships; Melbourne, Australia; Grass; Singles - Doubles	(Australia) C. Greene; 6–1, 6–1	(Australia) Ellen Mayne	(Australia) Constance Raleigh (Australia) Mabel Shaw	
29 Oct	Victorian Championships; Melbourne, Australia; Grass; Singles - Doubles	(Australia) Miss Mayne (Australia) Mabel Shaw; 6–1, 6–0	(Australia) Miss Barnard (Australia) Miss Brunton	(Australia) Constance Raleigh (Australia) Mabel Shaw	

=== November ===
No events

=== December ===
Ended	Tournament	Winner	Finalist	Semi finalist	Quarter finalist
30 Dec	New Zealand Championships (1st ed); Farndon Park; Napier, New Zealand; Grass; Singles - Doubles	(New Zealand) Sarah Lance; 6–2, 3–6, 6–1	(New Zealand) Hilda Hitchings	(New Zealand) E Harman (New Zealand) Mrs G Way	
30 Dec	New Zealand Championships (1st ed); Farndon Park; Napier, New Zealand; Grass; Singles - Doubles	(New Zealand) Sarah Lance (New Zealand) Mrs G Way; 6–1, 6–4	(New Zealand) Miss Hannin (New Zealand) Miss Cotterill	(New Zealand) E Harman (New Zealand) Mrs G Way	
30 Dec	New Zealand Championships (1st ed); Farndon Park; Napier, New Zealand; Grass; Singles - Doubles	(New Zealand) Hilda Hitchings (New Zealand) EP Hudson; 6–3, 6–1	(New Zealand) Sarah Lance (New Zealand) HB Williams	(New Zealand) E Harman (New Zealand) Mrs G Way	
30 Dec	Napier Open; Farndon Park; Napier, New Zealand; Grass; Singles - Doubles	No Ladies Singles	No Ladies Doubles		
30 Dec	Napier Open; Farndon Park; Napier, New Zealand; Grass; Singles - Doubles	(New Zealand) Rose Tanner (New Zealand) J.W. Begg; 6–4, 6–0	(New Zealand) Hilda Hitchings (New Zealand) R. Smith		

== Tournament winners (singles) ==
This is a list of winners by the total number of singles titles won for 1886 major titles in bold:

- (Ireland) May Langrishe – Ballybrack, Howth, **Irish Championships**, Waterford (**4**)
- (England) Blanche Bingley – Edgbaston, Stamford Bridge, **Wimbledon Championships**, (**3**)
- (Scotland) Jane Meikle – Edinburgh II, Edinburgh III, Pollokshields, (**3**)
- (United Kingdom) Margaret Bracewell – Eastbourne, Edgbaston II, Scarborough, (**3**)
- (England) Beatrice Wood – Ilkley, Pontefract, (**2**)
- (England) Maud Watson – Exmouth, **Northern Championships**, (**2**)
- (Ireland) Louisa Martin – Buxton, Cheltenham, (**2**)
- (Australia) C. Greene – Melbourne, Sydney, (**2**)
- (United States) Miss Leslie – New Haven, (**1**)
- (England) Lottie Dod – Bath (**1**)
- (United Kingdom) Charlotte Cooper – Ealing, (**1**)
- (Wales) L. Browne – Penarth, (**1**)
- (England) Lillian Watson – Teignmouth, (**1**)
- (Ireland) Mabel Cahill – Kilkenny, (**1**)
- (England) Mabel Boulton – Edinburgh, (**1**)
- (New Zealand) Sarah Lance – Napier, (**1**)
- (United Kingdom) J. Wray – Redhill, (**1**)
- (Ireland) Beatrice Langrishe – Clifton, (**1**)
- (United Kingdom) Agnes Noon – Stafford, (**1**)
- (United Kingdom) Louisa Moir – Chapel Allerton, (**1**)
- (England) Katharine Hill – Aigburth, (**1**)
- (England) Miss Douglas – Chiswick Park, (**1**)
- (United Kingdom) Nora Pope – Taunton, (**1**)
- (United Kingdom) Agnes Watts – Leicester, (**1**)
- (United Kingdom) Gertrude Mellersh – Leamington Spa, (**1**)
- (Ireland) H. Esmonde – Wexford, (**1**)
- (United Kingdom) Florence Noon – Leicester, (**1**)
- (Ireland) Florence Stanuell – Darlington, (**1**)
- (United Kingdom) Miss Cobbold – East Grinstead, (**1**)
- (United Kingdom) A. Ridley – Felixstowe, (**1**)
- (United Kingdom) G. Rant – Saxmundham, (**1**)
- (United Kingdom) Katherine Hill – Tenby, (**1**)
- (England) Ann Dod – Mofatt, (**1**)
- (United Kingdom) Mrs Hornby – Bournemouth, (**1**)
- (United Kingdom) G. Walters – Whitby, (**1**)

== Season statistics ==
=== Singles ===
- Total Tournaments (55)
- Most Titles: (England) Blanche Bingley & (Ireland) May Langrishe & (United Kingdom) Margaret Bracewell & (Scotland) Jane Meikle (3)
- Most Finals: (England) Maud Watson (6)
