= 1888 women's tennis season =

1888 Women's tennis season
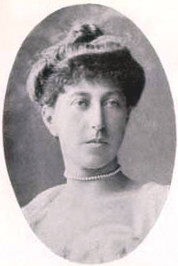
- Blanche Hillyard won the Irish Championships in May, she was also title leader this year

Details
- Duration: 27 February – 30 December
- Edition: 13th
- Tournaments: 67
- Categories: Important (4); National (4); Provincial/Regional/State (14); County (12); Regular (31)

Achievements (singles)
- Most titles: (England) Blanche Hillyard (7)
- Most finals: (England) Blanche Hillyard (10)

The 1888 Women's tennis season was a tennis circuit composed of 67 national, regional, county, and regular tournaments. It was the 13th annual season since the first women's tennis tournaments were held in 1876. The season began in February in Auckland, New Zealand, and ended in December in Napier, New Zealand.

== Summary of season ==
From 1888 until 1912 Britain's Lawn Tennis Association (LTA), grew in status and influence to become the de facto international tennis governing body before the proper International Lawn Tennis Federation commenced operations. Despite the United States National Lawn Tennis Association (USNLTA) forming in 1881 a good seven years before the LTA, it was the British body that set laws, settled disputes and organized the increasingly complicated tournament calendar before the International Lawn Tennis Federation (ILTF) formed in March,1913.

After the formation of the ILTF the world tennis circuit going forward was a highly organised and structured network of national and international tournaments. Most tennis tournaments were usually mixed events for men and women, and the women's international tennis circuit certainly up to 1923 was composed mainly of tournaments on the British and European Circuits. After the USNLTA joined the ILTF this would later change with more and more tournaments being staged globally. Women tennis players on the world circuit up to the open era were funded by their national associations enabling them to travel and take part in international tournaments.

1888 sees a decrease in the number women's singles events on the previous year being held as the tennis circuit continues to form. The 1888 women's tennis season began on 27 February with the|Auckland Association Championships in Auckland, New Zealand. In May 1888 at the first major event of the year the Irish Championships played at the Fitzwilliam Lawn Tennis Club in Dublin, Ireland. England's Blanche Hillyard wins the singles title for the first time compatriot Bertha Steedman two sets to love. The ladies doubles event is won by English sister's Bertha Steedman and Mary Steedman, and in the mixed doubles Margaret Bracewell partnering Ernest Wool Lewis defeat the English/Irish pairing of Bertha Steedman and Hugh Cairns. In June 1888 sees a change in scheduling when the U.S. National Championships held at the Philadelphia Cricket Club, PA are brought forward this month, Bertha Townsend sweeps away title holder Ellen Hansell in straight sets.

Later at the end of June the third major tournament of the year the Northern Championships is played at the Liverpool Cricket Club in Liverpool sees Lottie Dod retain her title beating Irish Champion Blanche Hillyard in straights sets, the women's doubles event is won by the sister's Ann Dod and Lottie Dod who defeat the English/Irish pairing of Margaret Bracewell and May Langrishe in the final. The All England mixed doubles event is won by Blanche Hillyard and Ernest Renshaw defeating Lottie Dod and John Charles Kay on their way to the title. In June Ireland's Connie Butler wins the Scottish Championships in Edinburgh against England's Ann Dod, and at the Welsh Championships in Penarth Blanche Hillyard takes the title against Miss N Pope.

In July at the 1888 Wimbledon Championships the world's first major tennis tournament, Lottie Dod successfully defends last years title, when she defeats Blanche Hillyard in straight sets to claim her second major title of the season. The season ended on 30 December 1888 at the New Zealand Championships, held in Napier, New Zealand played on grass.

== Season results ==
Prior to the creation of the International Lawn Tennis Federation and the establishment of its world championship events in 1913 the Wimbledon Championships, the U.S. National Championships, the Irish Lawn Tennis Championships and the Northern Championships were considered by players and historians as the four most important tennis tournaments to win.

This is a calendar of all known official events that were administered by national, regional, provincial, state, and county lawn tennis associations in the year 1888, with player progression documented from the quarter-finals stage where historical sources have permitted.

Key

Important.
National
Provincial/State/Regional
County
Regular

=== January ===
No events

=== February ===
No events

=== March ===
Ended	Tournament	Winner	Finalist	Semifinalist	Quarterfinalist
1 Mar.	Auckland Association Championships; Auckland, New Zealand; Grass; Singles - Doubles	(New Zealand) Miss. Mowbray; 6–2, 6–0	(New Zealand) Miss. Jahn		

=== April ===
Ended	Tournament	Winner	Finalist	Semifinalist	Quarterfinalist
12 Apr.	Ceylon Championships; The Hill Club; Nuwara Eliya, Ceylon; Clay; Singles - Doubles	(Dominion of Ceylon) Miss I. J. Watson; 6–1, 6–1, 6–5	(Dominion of Ceylon) Miss A'Esterre		

=== May ===
Ended	Tournament	Winner	Finalist	Semifinalist	Quarterfinalist
7 May.	Inter-Colonial Lawn Tennis Tournament (Championship of New South Wales); Sydney, Australia; Grass; Singles - Doubles	(Australia) Lillian Scott; 8–6, 6–4	(Australia) Ellen Mayne	(Australia) Eliza Fitzgerald (Australia) Edith L Fox	(Australia) Florence Batt (Australia) Ellen Blaxland (Australia) Ada Keele (Australia) Miss Maddrell
7 May.	Inter-Colonial Lawn Tennis Tournament (Championship of New South Wales); Sydney, Australia; Grass; Singles - Doubles	Challenger (Australia) Ellen Mayne		(Australia) Eliza Fitzgerald (Australia) Edith L Fox	(Australia) Florence Batt (Australia) Ellen Blaxland (Australia) Ada Keele (Australia) Miss Maddrell
7 May.	Inter-Colonial Lawn Tennis Tournament (Championship of New South Wales); Sydney, Australia; Grass; Singles - Doubles	(Australia) Lilian Scott (Australia) Zilla Scott; 6–1, 3–6, 6–2	(Australia) Edith Fox (Australia) Ellen Mayne	(Australia) Eliza Fitzgerald (Australia) Edith L Fox	(Australia) Florence Batt (Australia) Ellen Blaxland (Australia) Ada Keele (Australia) Miss Maddrell
7 May.	Inter-Colonial Lawn Tennis Tournament (Championship of New South Wales); Sydney, Australia; Grass; Singles - Doubles	(Australia) Ellen Mayne (Australia) Dudley Webb; 6–4, 2–6, 6–1	(Australia) Zilla Scott (Australia) Alec Chomley	(Australia) Eliza Fitzgerald (Australia) Edith L Fox	(Australia) Florence Batt (Australia) Ellen Blaxland (Australia) Ada Keele (Australia) Miss Maddrell
26 May.	West of Scotland Championships; Pollockshields Athletic Club; Pollokshields, Scotland; Grass; Singles - Doubles	(Scotland) Miss Rose; 6–0, 10–8	(England) Miss Simpson		
26 May	Flushing Spring Tournament; Flushing Athletic Club; Flushing, United States; Grass; Singles - Doubles	(United States) Ellen M. Lynch; 6–3, 6–3, 6–3	(United States) Miss Ward	(United States) Miss Bogert (United States) Miss Mann	
26 May	Irish Championships; Fitzwilliam LTC; Dublin, Ireland; Grass; Singles - Doubles	(England) Blanche Hillyard; 7–5, 6–2	(United Kingdom) Bertha Steedman	(England) Constance Bryan (Ireland) May Langrishe	(Ireland) Connie Butler (United Kingdom) Margaret Bracewell (United Kingdom) Mary Steedman (Ireland) Isabella Smyth
26 May	Irish Championships; Fitzwilliam LTC; Dublin, Ireland; Grass; Singles - Doubles	(United Kingdom) Bertha Steedman (United Kingdom) Mary Steedman; 6–2, 3–6, 6–1	(United Kingdom) Margaret Bracewell (England) Blanche Hillyard	(England) Constance Bryan (Ireland) May Langrishe	(Ireland) Connie Butler (United Kingdom) Margaret Bracewell (United Kingdom) Mary Steedman (Ireland) Isabella Smyth
26 May	Irish Championships; Fitzwilliam LTC; Dublin, Ireland; Grass; Singles - Doubles	(United Kingdom) Margaret Bracewell (England) Ernest Wool Lewis; 6–3, 6–3, 4–6, 9–7	(United Kingdom) Bertha Steedman (Ireland) H Cairns	(England) Constance Bryan (Ireland) May Langrishe	(Ireland) Connie Butler (United Kingdom) Margaret Bracewell (United Kingdom) Mary Steedman (Ireland) Isabella Smyth

=== June ===
Ended	Tournament	Winner	Finalist	Semifinalist	Quarterfinalist
1 Jun	Washington D.C. Open Tournament; Kendall Green; Washington D.C., United States; Grass; Singles - Doubles	(United States) Florence Bayard; 6–2, 6–0, 6–1	(United States) Agnes S. Bartlett		
1 Jun	Washington D.C. Open Tournament; Kendall Green; Washington D.C., United States; Grass; Singles - Doubles	(United States) Florence Bayard (United States) Annie J. Safford; 6–0, 6–1, 6–3	(United States) Agnes S. Bartlett (United States) Sallie A. Bartlett		
2 Jun.	Championship of West of England; Lansdown Cricket Club; Bath, England; Grass; Singles - Doubles	(England) Lottie Dod; 6–3, 6–0	(United Kingdom) N. Pope	(United Kingdom) Margaret Bracewell (England) Gertrude Gibbs	(England) Ann Dod (England) Blanche Hillyard (Ireland) Beatrice Langrishe
2 Jun.	Championship of West of England; Lansdown Cricket Club; Bath, England; Grass; Singles - Doubles	(England) Ann Dod (England) Lottie Dod; 11–9, 7–5	(Ireland) Beatrice Langrishe (United Kingdom) N. Pope	(United Kingdom) Margaret Bracewell (England) Gertrude Gibbs	(England) Ann Dod (England) Blanche Hillyard (Ireland) Beatrice Langrishe
2 Jun.	Championship of West of England; Lansdown Cricket Club; Bath, England; Grass; Singles - Doubles	(United Kingdom) Margaret Bracewell (England) Harry Grove; 6–4, 4–6, 6–1	(England) Lottie Dod (England) Anthony Dod	(United Kingdom) Margaret Bracewell (England) Gertrude Gibbs	(England) Ann Dod (England) Blanche Hillyard (Ireland) Beatrice Langrishe
2 Jun.	New York Tennis Club Open; New York Tennis Club; New York City, United States; Clay; Singles - Doubles	(United States) Miss Locke; 6–1, 6–1	(United States) A McKinley	(United States) Adelaide Badgley (United States) Mrs Johnson	
2 Jun.	New York Tennis Club Open; New York Tennis Club; New York City, United States; Clay; Singles - Doubles	(United States) Adelaide Badgley (United States) Howard Badgley; Won	(United States) Augustus Schultz (United States) William D. Hobart	(United States) Adelaide Badgley (United States) Mrs Johnson	
9 Jun.	East Gloucestershire Championships; Cheltenham LTC; Grass; Cheltenham, England; Singles - Doubles	(Ireland) Louisa Martin; 6–4, 5–7, 6–2	(England) Blanche Hillyard	(United Kingdom) Margaret Bracewell (United Kingdom) Miss Fenwick	(United Kingdom) Gertrude Bracewell (England) Ellen Browne (England) M. Crossley (Ireland) Beatrice Langrishe
9 Jun.	Whitehouse Open; Whitehouse LTC; Edinburgh, Scotland; Clay; Singles - Doubles	(England) Ann Dod; 6–2, 8–6	(Scotland) J Ferguson		
9 Jun.	Whitehouse Open; Whitehouse LTC; Edinburgh, Scotland; Clay; Singles - Doubles	(England) Ann Dod (Scotland) J Ferguson; 6–2, 6–4	(Scotland) Miss Meikle (Scotland) Jane Meikle		
9 Jun.	Whitehouse Open; Whitehouse LTC; Edinburgh, Scotland; Clay; Singles - Doubles	(England) Ann Dod (Scotland) Richard Millar Watson; 5–7, 6–3, 6–4	(Scotland) J Ferguson (Scotland) CD Murray		
13 Jun.	Nottinghamshire LTA Tournament; Trent Bridge Ground; Nottingham, England; Grass; Singles - Doubles	(United Kingdom) Florence Noon; 6–2, 6–1	(United Kingdom) Frances Snook	(United Kingdom) Charlotte Snook (United Kingdom) Agnes Noon Watts	(United Kingdom) Miss Exham (United Kingdom) Mrs Hill
15 Jun.	U.S. National Championships; Philadelphia Country Club; Philadelphia, United States; Grass; Singles	(United States) Bertha Townsend; 6–3, 6–5	(United States) Marion Wright	(United States) Adeline Robinson	(United States) Ellen Roosevelt (United States) Violet Ward
15 Jun.	U.S. National Championships; Philadelphia Country Club; Philadelphia, United States; Grass; Singles	Challenger (United States) Ellen Hansell		(United States) Adeline Robinson	(United States) Ellen Roosevelt (United States) Violet Ward
16 Jun.	Kent All-Comers' Championships; Beckenham LTC; Beckenham, England; Grass; Singles - Doubles	(United Kingdom) May Jacks; 1–6, 6–3, 6–0	(United Kingdom) Edith Gurney	(England) Miss Canning (England) N. Howes	(England) Miss Aste (England) E. Forrest (United Kingdom) J. Kennedy (United Kingdom) A. Wickham
16 Jun.	Kent All-Comers' Championships; Beckenham LTC; Beckenham, England; Grass; Singles - Doubles	(United Kingdom) Edith Gurney (England) Charles Ross	(United Kingdom) May Jacks (United Kingdom) “A.N. Other”	(England) Miss Canning (England) N. Howes	(England) Miss Aste (England) E. Forrest (United Kingdom) J. Kennedy (United Kingdom) A. Wickham
16 Jun.	Scottish Championships; Dyvour Club; Edinburgh, Scotland; Grass; Singles - Doubles	(Ireland) Connie Butler; 6–3, 6–3	(England) Beatrice Wood	(Scotland) E, Ferguson (Scotland) J. Ferguson	(Scotland) Jane Meikle (Scotland) Miss Meikle (Scotland) Miss Rankine
16 Jun.	Scottish Championships; Dyvour Club; Edinburgh, Scotland; Grass; Singles - Doubles	Challenger (England) Ann Dod		(Scotland) E, Ferguson (Scotland) J. Ferguson	(Scotland) Jane Meikle (Scotland) Miss Meikle (Scotland) Miss Rankine
16 Jun.	Welsh Championships; Penarth LTC; Penarth, Wales; Grass; Singles - Doubles	(England) Blanche Hillyard; 6–3, 6–3	(United Kingdom) Miss N. Pope		
22 Jun	London Championships; London Athletic Club; Stamford Bridge, England; Grass; Singles - Doubles	(England) Blanche Hillyard; 6–4, 6–3	(England) Miss Canning	(England) Mrs A. Burr	
22 Jun	London Championships; London Athletic Club; Stamford Bridge, England; Grass; Singles - Doubles	Challenger (England) May Jacks		(England) Mrs A. Burr	
23 Jun.	Northern Championships; Liverpool Cricket Club; Liverpool, England; Grass; Singles - Doubles	(England) Lottie Dod; 6–3, 9–7	(Ireland) May Langrishe	(United Kingdom) Margaret Bracewell (Ireland) Louisa Martin	(United Kingdom) Gertrude Bracewell (England) Florence Mardall (England) Beatrice Wood (Ireland) Florence Stanuell
23 Jun.	Northern Championships; Liverpool Cricket Club; Liverpool, England; Grass; Singles - Doubles	Challenger (England) Blanche Hillyard		(United Kingdom) Margaret Bracewell (Ireland) Louisa Martin	(United Kingdom) Gertrude Bracewell (England) Florence Mardall (England) Beatrice Wood (Ireland) Florence Stanuell
23 Jun.	Northern Championships; Liverpool Cricket Club; Liverpool, England; Grass; Singles - Doubles	(England) Ann Dod (England) Lottie Dod; 6–3, 6–2	(United Kingdom) Margaret Bracewell (Ireland) May Langrishe	(United Kingdom) Margaret Bracewell (Ireland) Louisa Martin	(United Kingdom) Gertrude Bracewell (England) Florence Mardall (England) Beatrice Wood (Ireland) Florence Stanuell
23 Jun.	Northern Championships; Liverpool Cricket Club; Liverpool, England; Grass; Singles - Doubles	(England) Blanche Hillyard (England) Ernest Renshaw; 7–5, 10–8	(England) Lottie Dod (United Kingdom) John Charles Kay	(United Kingdom) Margaret Bracewell (Ireland) Louisa Martin	(United Kingdom) Gertrude Bracewell (England) Florence Mardall (England) Beatrice Wood (Ireland) Florence Stanuell
30 Jun.	Waterloo Tournament; Waterloo LTC; Waterloo, England; Grass; Singles - Doubles	(England) Ann Dod; 4–6, 6–0, 6–3	(England) K. Hill		
30 Jun.	Waterloo Tournament; Waterloo LTC; Waterloo, England; Grass; Singles - Doubles	(England) M. Pick (United Kingdom) John Charles; 8–6, 6–3	(England) K. Hill (United Kingdom) William Wethered		
30 Jun.	Midland Counties Championships; Edgbaston CLTC; Edgbaston, England; Grass; Singles - Doubles	(United Kingdom) Margaret Bracewell; 7–5, 6–2	(England) Florence Mardall	(United Kingdom) Gertrude Bracewell (United Kingdom) J. Wray	(United Kingdom) Mrs G Elkington (United Kingdom) Bertha Steedman (United Kingdom) Mary Steedman (England) Lilian Watson
30 Jun.	Midland Counties Championships; Edgbaston CLTC; Edgbaston, England; Grass; Singles - Doubles	(England) Lilian Watson (England) Maud Watson; 6–0 1–0, retd	(United Kingdom) Bertha Steedman (United Kingdom) Mary Steedman	(United Kingdom) Gertrude Bracewell (United Kingdom) J. Wray	(United Kingdom) Mrs G Elkington (United Kingdom) Bertha Steedman (United Kingdom) Mary Steedman (England) Lilian Watson
30 Jun.	Midland Counties Championships; Edgbaston CLTC; Edgbaston, England; Grass; Singles - Doubles	(England) Maud Watson (United Kingdom) John Redfern Deykin; 0–6, 7–5, 6–2	(United Kingdom) Bertha Steedman (United Kingdom) George Brown	(United Kingdom) Gertrude Bracewell (United Kingdom) J. Wray	(United Kingdom) Mrs G Elkington (United Kingdom) Bertha Steedman (United Kingdom) Mary Steedman (England) Lilian Watson

Ended	Tournament	Winner	Finalist	Semifinalist	Quarterfinalist
1 Jul.	Natal Championships; Pietermaritzburg, Colony of Natal; Grass; Singles - Doubles	(Colony of Natal) Mabel Grant; 6–4, 6–3	(Colony of Natal) Norah Hickman	(Colony of Natal) Beatrice Grant (Colony of Natal) Miss Lloyd	(Colony of Natal) Miss Grant (Colony of Natal) Miss Nimmo
1 Jul.	Natal Championships; Pietermaritzburg, Colony of Natal; Grass; Singles - Doubles	Challenger (Colony of Natal) L. Button		(Colony of Natal) Beatrice Grant (Colony of Natal) Miss Lloyd	(Colony of Natal) Miss Grant (Colony of Natal) Miss Nimmo
1 Jul.	Natal Championships; Pietermaritzburg, Colony of Natal; Grass; Singles - Doubles	(Colony of Natal) L. Button (Colony of Natal) Reuben Benningfield; 6–1, 6–3	(Colony of Natal) Mabel Grant (Colony of Natal) William J. Grant	(Colony of Natal) Beatrice Grant (Colony of Natal) Miss Lloyd	(Colony of Natal) Miss Grant (Colony of Natal) Miss Nimmo
21 Jul.	Taunton and West Somerset Lawn Tennis Tournament; Coton Hill Institution Grounds; Stafford, England; Grass; Singles - Doubles	(United Kingdom) N. Pope default	(United Kingdom) Louisa Sweet-Escott	(United Kingdom) A. Boucher (United Kingdom) Ada Meyler	(United Kingdom) Angel Smith (United Kingdom) Miss Kepple-Taylor
21 Jul.	Taunton and West Somerset Lawn Tennis Tournament; Coton Hill Institution Grounds; Stafford, England; Grass; Singles - Doubles	(United Kingdom) N. Pope (United Kingdom) Louisa Sweet-Escott; 6–2, 6–4	(United Kingdom) Ada Meyler (United Kingdom) Jessie Meyler	(United Kingdom) A. Boucher (United Kingdom) Ada Meyler	(United Kingdom) Angel Smith (United Kingdom) Miss Kepple-Taylor
7 Jul.	Staffordshire Lawn Tennis Tournament; Coton Hill Institution Grounds; Stafford, England; Grass; Singles - Doubles	(United Kingdom) Agnes Watts; 6–1, 0–6, 6–4	(United Kingdom) Bertha Steedman		
7 Jul.	Staffordshire Lawn Tennis Tournament; Coton Hill Institution Grounds; Stafford, England; Grass; Singles - Doubles	(United Kingdom) Bertha Steedman (England) Ernest Wool Lewis; 6–4, 6–1	(United Kingdom) Mary Steedman (United Kingdom) John Redfern Deykin		
19 Jul.	Leamington Open Tournament; Leamington Spa, England; Grass; Singles - Doubles	(United Kingdom) Alice Pickering; 4–6, 6–1, 6–2	(United Kingdom) Mrs Christie		
19 Jul.	Wimbledon Championships; AELTC; London, England; Grass; Singles - Doubles	(England) Lottie Dod; 6–2, 6–0	(United Kingdom) Miss Howes	(England) D. Patterson (United Kingdom) Miss Phillimore	(United Kingdom) Miss Canning (United Kingdom) Blanche Williams
19 Jul.	Wimbledon Championships; AELTC; London, England; Grass; Singles - Doubles	Challenger (England) Blanche Hillyard		(England) D. Patterson (United Kingdom) Miss Phillimore	(United Kingdom) Miss Canning (United Kingdom) Blanche Williams
24 Jul.	Meadow Club Invitation; Meadow Club; Southampton, United States; Grass; Singles - Doubles	(United States) E. K. Lente; 6–4, 5–6, 6–4	(United States) A Smallwood	(United States) May Colby (United States) M. Lente	(United States) Mrs Babbitt (United States) J Fraser (United States) E. W. Smith (United States) N Trowbridge
24 Jul.	Meadow Club Invitation; Meadow Club; Southampton, United States; Grass; Singles - Doubles	(United States) E. K. Lente (United States) A. Smallwood; 6–1, 6–1	(United States) May Colby (United States) J Fraser	(United States) May Colby (United States) M. Lente	(United States) Mrs Babbitt (United States) J Fraser (United States) E. W. Smith (United States) N Trowbridge
24 Jul.	Meadow Club Invitation; Meadow Club; Southampton, United States; Grass; Singles - Doubles	(United States) Miss Betts (United States) Henry Slocum; 6–4, 11–9	(United States) Miss Gregory (United States) Oliver Samuel Campbell	(United States) May Colby (United States) M. Lente	(United States) Mrs Babbitt (United States) J Fraser (United States) E. W. Smith (United States) N Trowbridge
28 Jul	Yorkshire Association and County Open Tournament; Ilkley LTC; Ilkley, England; Grass; Singles - Doubles	(United Kingdom) Margaret Bracewell; 3–6, 6–0, 7–5	(England) Mabel Boulton	(United Kingdom) Gertrude Bracewell (Ireland) L. Chatterton-Clarke	(United Kingdom) M. Crossley (England) Miss Hutchinson
28 Jul	Yorkshire Association and County Open Tournament; Ilkley LTC; Ilkley, England; Grass; Singles - Doubles	Challenger (United Kingdom) Beatrice Wood		(United Kingdom) Gertrude Bracewell (Ireland) L. Chatterton-Clarke	(United Kingdom) M. Crossley (England) Miss Hutchinson
28 Jul	Yorkshire Association and County Open Tournament; Ilkley LTC; Ilkley, England; Grass; Singles - Doubles	(United Kingdom) Margaret Bracewell (United Kingdom) James Baldwin default	(United Kingdom) Gertrude Bracewell (United Kingdom) Marmaduke S. Constable	(United Kingdom) Gertrude Bracewell (Ireland) L. Chatterton-Clarke	(United Kingdom) M. Crossley (England) Miss Hutchinson
28 Jul	Middlesex Championships; Chiswick, England; Grass; Singles - Doubles	(England) Blanche Hillyard; 6–2, 6–4	(England) Edith Cole	(England) Ethel Gurney (England) Miss Malcolm	(England) Mrs Anderson (England) Miss Howes (England) May Jacks (United Kingdom) H. James
28 Jul	Middlesex Championships; Chiswick, England; Grass; Singles - Doubles	Challenger (England) D Patterson (holder)		(England) Ethel Gurney (England) Miss Malcolm	(England) Mrs Anderson (England) Miss Howes (England) May Jacks (United Kingdom) H. James
28 Jul	Middlesex Championships; Chiswick, England; Grass; Singles - Doubles	(United Kingdom) Edith Gurney (England) Blanche Hillyard; 6–1, 6–3	(England) D Patterson (United Kingdom) J Wray	(England) Ethel Gurney (England) Miss Malcolm	(England) Mrs Anderson (England) Miss Howes (England) May Jacks (United Kingdom) H. James
29 Jul.	Ealing LTC Championship; Ealing LTC; Ealing, England; Grass; Singles - Doubles	(United Kingdom) A. Francesca Brown; Won	(United Kingdom) ?		

=== August ===
Ended	Tournament	Winner	Finalist	Semifinalist	Quarterfinalist
4 Aug.	Northumberland Championships; Newcastle upon Tyne, England; Grass; Singles - Doubles	(Ireland) Connie Butler; 3–6, 6–4, 6–4	(England) Ann Dod	(England) Helen Jackson (England) Beatrice Wood	(England) Mrs Raggett (England) Miss Swarbreck (England) Miss Tarver (England) A. Turner
4 Aug.	Northumberland Championships; Newcastle upon Tyne, England; Grass; Singles - Doubles	(England) Ann Dod (Scotland) John Galbraith Horn walkover	(England) Helen Jackson (United Kingdom) Charles Liddell	(England) Helen Jackson (England) Beatrice Wood	(England) Mrs Raggett (England) Miss Swarbreck (England) Miss Tarver (England) A. Turner
6 Aug	Derbyshire Championships; Buxton, England; Grass; Singles - Doubles	(England) Blanche Hillyard; 7–5, 6–1	(Ireland) May Langrishe	(United Kingdom) Gertrude Bracewell (England) M. Goodman	(United Kingdom) Margaret Bracewell (United Kingdom) M. Crossley (England) Katherine Hill (England) Miss Pickthall
6 Aug	Derbyshire Championships; Buxton, England; Grass; Singles - Doubles	(England) Lottie Dod (Ireland) May Langrishe; 6–3, 6–3	(United Kingdom) Bertha Steedman (United Kingdom) Mary Steedman	(United Kingdom) Gertrude Bracewell (England) M. Goodman	(United Kingdom) Margaret Bracewell (United Kingdom) M. Crossley (England) Katherine Hill (England) Miss Pickthall
6 Aug	Derbyshire Championships; Buxton, England; Grass; Singles - Doubles	(England) Lottie Dod (Ireland) William Drummond Hamilton; 6–0, 6–1	(United Kingdom) Margaret Bracewell (Ireland) Tom Campion	(United Kingdom) Gertrude Bracewell (England) M. Goodman	(United Kingdom) Margaret Bracewell (United Kingdom) M. Crossley (England) Katherine Hill (England) Miss Pickthall
6 Aug	Staten Island Invitation; Staten Island Athletic Club; West New Brighton, United States; Grass; Singles - Doubles	(United States) Adeline Robinson; 6–1, 6–1	(United States) G. Quartley	(United States) A. Larkin (United States) L. Vorhees	(United States) L. Bailey (United States) Miss Dean (United States) N. Janssen (United States) Gertrude Williams
6 Aug	Staten Island Invitation; Staten Island Athletic Club; West New Brighton, United States; Grass; Singles - Doubles	(United States) Adeline Robinson (United States) Gertrude Williams; 6–0, 6–1	(United States) M. Bailey (United States) G. Quartley	(United States) A. Larkin (United States) L. Vorhees	(United States) L. Bailey (United States) Miss Dean (United States) N. Janssen (United States) Gertrude Williams
9 Aug	Darlington Association Tournament; Feethams Cricket Ground; Darlington, England; Grass; Singles - Doubles	(United Kingdom) Beatrice Wood; 3–6, 6–0, 6–3	(England) Ann Dod		
9 Aug	Darlington Association Tournament; Feethams Cricket Ground; Darlington, England; Grass; Singles - Doubles	(England) Ann Dod (United Kingdom) Miss Lucas; 5–7, 6–4, 6–2	(United Kingdom) Ethel Cheese (United Kingdom) Mary Cheese		
9 Aug	Darlington Association Tournament; Feethams Cricket Ground; Darlington, England; Grass; Singles - Doubles	(England) Ann Dod (Scotland) John Galbraith Horn; 7–5, 13–11	(Scotland) Constance Bowes-Lyon (Scotland) Patrick Bowes-Lyon		
10 Aug	Keswick and Lake District Lawn Tennis Tournament; Fitz Park; Keswick, England. Grass; Singles - Doubles	(United Kingdom) Lydia Cheetham; 5–7, 6–3, 6–2	(United Kingdom) Florence Haines		
10 Aug	Keswick and Lake District Lawn Tennis Tournament; Fitz Park; Keswick, England. Grass; Singles - Doubles	(United Kingdom) Miss Allen (United Kingdom) J.E.R. Allen; 1–6, 6–1, 6–4	(United Kingdom) E. Haines (United Kingdom) Edgar J. Chippendale		
10 Aug	East Grinstead Lawn Tennis Tournament; East Grinstead LTCC; East Grinstead, England; Grass; Singles - Doubles	(United Kingdom) Ivy Arbuthnot (United Kingdom) May Arbuthnot divided title			
10 Aug	East Grinstead Lawn Tennis Tournament; East Grinstead LTCC; East Grinstead, England; Grass; Singles - Doubles	(United Kingdom) Ivy Arbuthnot (United Kingdom) May Arbuthnot; 6–1, 6–0	(United Kingdom) Miss Birch (United Kingdom) Miss Thompson		
10 Aug	East Grinstead Lawn Tennis Tournament; East Grinstead LTCC; East Grinstead, England; Grass; Singles - Doubles	(United Kingdom) A. Covey (United Kingdom) Harold Stone; 7–5, 6–3	(United Kingdom) J. Saint Clair (United Kingdom) P.E. Wallis		
11 Aug	Exmouth Tournament; Exmouth Ground; Exmouth, England; Grass; Singles - Doubles	(England) Blanche Hillyard; 6–3, 6–1	(United Kingdom) Miss Bryan	(England) Katharine Kindersley (Ireland) Lilian Pine-Coffin	(England) Edith Gurney (Ireland) Beatrice Langrishe (Ireland) May Langrishe (England) Florence Mardall
11 Aug	Exmouth Tournament; Exmouth Ground; Exmouth, England; Grass; Singles - Doubles	(England) Ann Dod (United Kingdom) Miss Lucas; 5–7, 6–4, 6–2	(United Kingdom) Ethel Cheese (United Kingdom) Mary Cheese	(England) Katharine Kindersley (Ireland) Lilian Pine-Coffin	(England) Edith Gurney (Ireland) Beatrice Langrishe (Ireland) May Langrishe (England) Florence Mardall
17 Aug	British Columbia Lawn Tennis Championships; Victoria LTC; Victoria, Canada; Grass; Singles - Doubles	(Canada) Frances Arrowsmith; Won	(Canada) Anastasia Musgrave		
18 Aug	East of Scotland Championships; St Andrews, Scotland; Grass; Singles - Doubles	(Scotland) Jane Meikle; 6–3, 6–4	(Scotland) A Corbett		
18 Aug	Felixstowe Open Lawn Tennis Tournament; Felixstowe LTC; Felixstowe, England; Grass; Singles - Doubles	(United Kingdom) Nellie Turner; 4–6, 6–2, 10–8	(United Kingdom) F Green		
18 Aug	Felixstowe Open Lawn Tennis Tournament; Felixstowe LTC; Felixstowe, England; Grass; Singles - Doubles	(United Kingdom) Helen Kersey (United Kingdom) Herbert Kersey; 6–3, 6–0	(United Kingdom) Mrs K.E. Hawkins (United Kingdom) Arthur B. Longe		
20 Aug	Narragansett Pier Open; Narragansett, United States; Grass; Singles - Doubles	(United States) Adeline Robinson; 6–0, 6–1, 6–0	(United States) Ellen Roosevelt		
20 Aug	Narragansett Pier Open; Narragansett, United States; Grass; Singles - Doubles	(United States) Ellen Roosevelt (United States) Oliver Samuel Campbell; 6–2, 6–2, 4–6, 6–3	(United States) Adeline Robinson (United States) Howard Augustus Taylor		
23 Aug	Saxmundham LTC Tournament; Hurts Hall Park; Saxmundham, England; Grass; Singles - Doubles	(United Kingdom) Miss Norman; 6–1, 6–2	(Wales) Edith Austin		
23 Aug	Saxmundham LTC Tournament; Hurts Hall Park; Saxmundham, England; Grass; Singles - Doubles	(United Kingdom) E. Hawkins (United Kingdom) G. Rant; 6–2, 6–3	(United Kingdom) K. Gilbert (United Kingdom) E. Rawlinson		
23 Aug	Saxmundham LTC Tournament; Hurts Hall Park; Saxmundham, England; Grass; Singles - Doubles	(United Kingdom) Miss Norman (United Kingdom) G. Norman; 6–0, 6–2	(United Kingdom) E. Rawlinson (United Kingdom) Rodwell		
24 Aug	Torquay Lawn Tennis Tournament; Torquay, England; Grass; Singles - Doubles	(United Kingdom) Miss Mockler	(United Kingdom) A. Foley		
24 Aug	Torquay Lawn Tennis Tournament; Torquay, England; Grass; Singles - Doubles	(United Kingdom) Edith Gurney (England) Ernest Wool Lewis; 6–1, 6–2	(United Kingdom) Miss Wolfe (United Kingdom) William Inchbald		
25 Aug	Hitchin Tournament; Hitchin, England; Grass; Singles - Doubles	(United Kingdom) May Jacks; 6–0, 6–3	(United Kingdom) Florence Hilda Caldecott		
25 Aug	Hitchin Tournament; Hitchin, England; Grass; Singles - Doubles	(United Kingdom) Ivy Arbuthnot (United Kingdom) May Arbuthnot; 6–3, 3–6, 9–7	(United Kingdom) Geraldine Buttanshaw (United Kingdom) Rosamond Buttanshaw		
25 Aug	Hitchin Tournament; Hitchin, England; Grass; Singles - Doubles	(United Kingdom) May Jacks (United Kingdom) Herbert C. Yockney; 6–3, 6–3	(United Kingdom) Geraldine Buttanshaw (United Kingdom) Charles Gladstone Allen		
25 Aug	South of Scotland Championships; Moffat, Scotland; Grass; Singles - Doubles	(Scotland) E. Malcolm; 6–4, 3–6, 6–3	(Scotland) Lottie Paterson		
25 Aug	South of Scotland Championships; Moffat, Scotland; Grass; Singles - Doubles	(Scotland) E. Malcolm (Scotland) Lottie Paterson; 6–2, 6–2	(England) Miss Pierce (England) A Pierce		
25 Aug	South of Scotland Championships; Moffat, Scotland; Grass; Singles - Doubles	(Scotland) E. Malcolm (United Kingdom) F.R.B. Pinhorn; 6–1, 4–6, 6–2	(Scotland) Lottie Paterson (United Kingdom) B McCulloch		
26 Aug.	Southern California Championships; Santa Monica Casino Courts; Santa Monica, United States; Asphalt; Singles - Doubles	(United States) Miss G. Gilliland; 6–2, 6–0	(United Kingdom) May Carter	(United States) Miss Schumacher	
26 Aug.	Southern California Championships; Santa Monica Casino Courts; Santa Monica, United States; Asphalt; Singles - Doubles	(United States) Mrs. Waring (United States) R. P. Carter; 6–2, 6–3	(United States) Miss Gilliland (United States) Miss Schumacher	(United States) Miss Schumacher	
27 Aug	County Kildare Championship; Naas, Ireland; Grass; Singles - Doubles	(Ireland) Miss. A. Weldon; 6–1, 6–4	(Ireland) Miss. C. DeBurgh		
27 Aug	County Kildare Championship; Naas, Ireland; Grass; Singles - Doubles	(Ireland) Miss. A. Weldon (Ireland) John C. Kennedy; 6–4, 7–5, 6–2	(Ireland) Mrs Ambrose Escott (Ireland) G. Weidon		
28 Aug	North of England Championships; Scarborough, Great Britain; Grass; Singles - Doubles	(United Kingdom) Margaret Bracewell; 1–6, 6–4, 9–7, 6–4	(Ireland) Connie Butler	(United Kingdom) Mary Steedman (England) Beatrice Wood	(England) Ann Dod (England) M Crossley (England) Clara Hill (England) A. Turner
28 Aug	North of England Championships; Scarborough, Great Britain; Grass; Singles - Doubles	Challenger (United Kingdom) Bertha Steedman		(United Kingdom) Mary Steedman (England) Beatrice Wood	(England) Ann Dod (England) M Crossley (England) Clara Hill (England) A. Turner
28 Aug	North of England Championships; Scarborough, Great Britain; Grass; Singles - Doubles	(England) Ann Dod (England) Lottie Dod; 6–3, 6–4	(United Kingdom) Bertha Steedman (United Kingdom) Mary Steedman	(United Kingdom) Mary Steedman (England) Beatrice Wood	(England) Ann Dod (England) M Crossley (England) Clara Hill (England) A. Turner
28 Aug	North of England Championships; Scarborough, Great Britain; Grass; Singles - Doubles	(United Kingdom) Margaret Bracewell (England) Harry Grove; 6–3, 6–1	(United Kingdom) Gertrude Bracewell (United Kingdom) Percy Bateman Brown	(United Kingdom) Mary Steedman (England) Beatrice Wood	(England) Ann Dod (England) M Crossley (England) Clara Hill (England) A. Turner
28 Aug	Seabright Invitational Tournament; Seabright LTCC; Rumson, United States; Grass; Singles - Doubles	(United States) Miss Clarkson; 6–2, 6–0	(United States) B. Lockwood		
28 Aug	Seabright Invitational Tournament; Seabright LTCC; Rumson, United States; Grass; Singles - Doubles	(United States) B. Lockwood (United States) H. Alexander; 4–6, 6–3, 6–0	(United States) Miss Thomas (United States) W. Ward		
28 Aug	Winnipeg Open Lawn Tennis Tournament; Winnipeg LTC; Winnipeg, Canada; Grass; Singles - Doubles	(Canada) Miss F. Adams; 6–5, 6–3	(Canada) Mrs. Eden		
28 Aug	Winnipeg Open Lawn Tennis Tournament; Winnipeg LTC; Winnipeg, Canada; Grass; Singles - Doubles	(Canada) Mrs. Ruttan (Canada) R.D. Applegate; 6–3, 6–4	(Canada) Mrs. Nares (Canada) Mr. Tuckweel		

=== September ===
Ended	Tournament	Winner	Finalist	Semifinalist	Quarterfinalist
1 Sep.	Bournemouth Lawn Tennis Club Tournament; Bournemouth CLTC; Bournemouth, England; Grass; Singles - Doubles	(Ireland) May Langrishe; 6–1, 7–5	(Ireland) Beatrice Langrishe	(United Kingdom) Miss Elphinston (United Kingdom) Miss Williams	(England) A. Everitt (England) Grace Grissell (United Kingdom) J.R. Robinson (United Kingdom) Mrs Surman
1 Sep.	Bournemouth Lawn Tennis Club Tournament; Bournemouth CLTC; Bournemouth, England; Grass; Singles - Doubles	Holder (United Kingdom) Constance Bryan		(United Kingdom) Miss Elphinston (United Kingdom) Miss Williams	(England) A. Everitt (England) Grace Grissell (United Kingdom) J.R. Robinson (United Kingdom) Mrs Surman
1 Sep.	Bournemouth Lawn Tennis Club Tournament; Bournemouth CLTC; Bournemouth, England; Grass; Singles - Doubles	(Ireland) Beatrice Langrishe (Ireland) May Langrishe; 4–6, 6–4, 6–1	(United Kingdom) Miss Bryan (United Kingdom) A. Everitt	(United Kingdom) Miss Elphinston (United Kingdom) Miss Williams	(England) A. Everitt (England) Grace Grissell (United Kingdom) J.R. Robinson (United Kingdom) Mrs Surman
3 Sep.	Sheffield and Hallamshire Tournament; Sheffield, England; Grass; Singles - Doubles	(United Kingdom) Miss Clark; 6–1, 6–2	(United Kingdom) Miss Crossley		
11 Sep	South of England Championships; Devonshire Park LTC; Eastbourne, England; Grass; Singles - Doubles	(England) Blanche Hillyard; 6–1, 6–1	(England) Constance Smith	(United Kingdom) E. Malcolm (England) Gertrude Mellersh	(England) Edith Gurney (England) Elizabeth Mocatta (England) Blanche Pedley (England) Catherine Triscott
11 Sep	South of England Championships; Devonshire Park LTC; Eastbourne, England; Grass; Singles - Doubles	Holder (United Kingdom) Margaret Bracewell		(United Kingdom) E. Malcolm (England) Gertrude Mellersh	(England) Edith Gurney (England) Elizabeth Mocatta (England) Blanche Pedley (England) Catherine Triscott
11 Sep	South of England Championships; Devonshire Park LTC; Eastbourne, England; Grass; Singles - Doubles	(United Kingdom) Margaret Bracewell (United Kingdom) Harry S. Barlow; 6–8, 6–2, 6–3	(England) Blanche Hillyard (Ireland) Tom Campion	(United Kingdom) E. Malcolm (England) Gertrude Mellersh	(England) Edith Gurney (England) Elizabeth Mocatta (England) Blanche Pedley (England) Catherine Triscott
13 Sep	Boulogne International Championship; TC Boulogne-sur-Mer; Boulogne-sur-Mer, France; Clay; Singles - Doubles	(United Kingdom) Mrs Knock; 2–6, 6–2, 7–5	(United Kingdom) Miss Hick		
15 Sep	Armagh Lawn Tennis Tournament; Archery LTC; Armagh, Ireland; Asphalt; Singles - Doubles	(Ireland) Lena Rice; 2–1 sets	(Ireland) May Langrishe		
16 Sep	Wijk aan Zee Ladies Tournament (round robin event); Wijk aan Zee TC; Wijk aan Zee, Netherlands; Clay; Singles - Doubles	(Netherlands) E. van de Poll; 2–0 matches	(Netherlands) Baronesse van Tuijll van Serooskerker (Netherlands) Mej. Matzen		
16 Sep	Essex Championships; Connaught Club; Chingford, England; Grass; Singles - Doubles	(United Kingdom) Miss Triscott; 6–4, 0–6, 6–4	(United Kingdom) Brenda James		
18 Sep	New Hamburg Invitation; New Hamburg LTC; New Hamburg, United States; Grass; Singles - Doubles	(United States) Ellen Roosevelt; Won	(United States) May Colby	(United States) Anna Kerr	
18 Sep	New Hamburg Invitation; New Hamburg LTC; New Hamburg, United States; Grass; Singles - Doubles	(United States) Ellen Roosevelt (United States) Grace Roosevelt; Won	(United States) Miss V. Hobart (United States) Camilla Moss	(United States) Anna Kerr	
19 Sep	New York Tennis Club Open; New York Tennis Club; New York City, United States; Clay; Singles - Doubles	No Women's Singles	(United States) May Colby		
19 Sep	New York Tennis Club Open; New York Tennis Club; New York City, United States; Clay; Singles - Doubles	(United States) Mrs H.G. Badgley (United States) Lida Vorhees; 5–6, 6–1, 6–4	(United States) Miss Hobart (United States) V. Hobart		
19 Sep	Belmont Fall Tennis Tournament; Belmont Cricket Club; West Philadelphia, United States; Grass; Singles - Doubles	(United States) Bertha Townsend; 9–7, 8–6	(United States) Nellie F. Hansell		
19 Sep	Belmont Fall Tennis Tournament; Belmont Cricket Club; West Philadelphia, United States; Grass; Singles - Doubles	(United States) Helen S. Taylor (United States) Laura Knight; 6–0, 6–5	(United States) Millie Dreka (United States) Helen Brown		
22 Sep.	Queensland Association Tournament (later Queensland Championships); Brisbane, Australia; Grass; Singles - Doubles	(Australia) Miss Earle; 12–9	(Australia) Mrs. Gilligan		
29 Sep	Hudson River Championships; Far & Near LTC; Hastings-on-Hudson, United States; Grass; Singles - Doubles	(United States) Ellen Roosevelt; Won	(United States) ?		
29 Sep	Hudson River Championships; Far & Near LTC; Hastings-on-Hudson, United States; Grass; Singles - Doubles	(United States) Ellen Roosevelt (United States) Grace Roosevelt; Won	(United States) ? (United States) ?		

=== October ===
Ended	Tournament	Winner	Finalist	Semi finalist	Quarter finalist
6 Oct	Ladies Club for Outdoor Sports Open; Livingston, United States; Singles - Doubles	(United States) Adeline Robinson; 4–6, 6–2, 6–3.	(United States) Miss Lesley		
6 Oct	Ladies Club for Outdoor Sports Open; Livingston, United States; Singles - Doubles	(United States) Ellen Roosevelt (United States) Grace Roosevelt; 6–2, 6–0	(United States) Adeline Robinson (United States) G. Williams		
14 Oct	Delaware Field Club Open; Delaware Field Club; Wilmington, United States; Clay; Singles - Doubles	(United States) Florence Bayard; 6–3, 6–0	(United States) (United States) Katharine Pyle		

=== November ===
Ended	Tournament	Winner	Finalist	Semifinalist	Quarterfinalist
1 Nov.	Victorian Championships; Melbourne, Australia; Grass; Singles - Doubles	(Australia) Miss M Mayne; 6–1, 3–6, 6–4	(Australia) Nellie A’Beckett	(Australia) E. M. Denny's (Australia) Mabel Shaw	(Australia) Annie Chenery
1 Nov.	Victorian Championships; Melbourne, Australia; Grass; Singles - Doubles	(Australia) Annie Chenery (Australia) Nellie Chenery; 6–4, 6–5	(Australia) Ellen Mayne (Australia) Phenie Shaw	(Australia) E. M. Denny's (Australia) Mabel Shaw	(Australia) Annie Chenery
1 Nov.	Victorian Championships; Melbourne, Australia; Grass; Singles - Doubles	(Australia) Nellie A'Beckett (Australia) Henry F. de Little; Won	?	(Australia) E. M. Denny's (Australia) Mabel Shaw	(Australia) Annie Chenery

=== December ===
Ended	Tournament	Winner	Finalist	Semifinalist	Quarterfinalist
30 Dec	New Zealand Championships; Farndon Park; Napier, New Zealand; Singles - Doubles	(New Zealand) E. Gordon; 6–5, 9–7	(New Zealand) Hilda Hitchings	(New Zealand) Sarah Tanner (New Zealand) Miss Weby	(New Zealand) Miss Bibby (New Zealand) Una Hitchings
30 Dec	New Zealand Championships; Farndon Park; Napier, New Zealand; Singles - Doubles	(New Zealand) E Gordon (New Zealand) Hilda Hitchings; 6–2, 6–2	(New Zealand) Miss Hill (New Zealand) Mrs E Tanner	(New Zealand) Sarah Tanner (New Zealand) Miss Weby	(New Zealand) Miss Bibby (New Zealand) Una Hitchings
30 Dec	New Zealand Championships; Farndon Park; Napier, New Zealand; Singles - Doubles	(New Zealand) E Gordon (New Zealand) Frederick Wilding; 6–1, 6–3	(New Zealand) Hilda Hitchings (New Zealand) CD Kennedy	(New Zealand) Sarah Tanner (New Zealand) Miss Weby	(New Zealand) Miss Bibby (New Zealand) Una Hitchings

== Tournament winners (singles) ==
This is a list of winners by the total number of singles titles won for 1888 major titles in bold:

- (England) Blanche Hillyard – Buxton, Chiswick Park, Eastbourne, Exmouth, Penarth, **Irish Championships** Stamford Bridge, (**7**)
- (England) Lottie Dod – Bath, **Northern Championships**, **Wimbledon Championships** (**3**)
- (United States) Adeline Robinson – Livingston, Narragansett, West New Brighton, (**3**)
- (England) Ann Dod – Edinburgh II, Waterloo (**2**)
- (Ireland) Connie Butler – Edinburgh, Newcastle upon Tyne, (**2**)
- (United Kingdom) May Jacks – Beckenham, Hitchin (**2**)
- (United Kingdom) Margaret Bracewell – Edgbaston, Scarborough, (**2**)
- (United States) Bertha Townsend – West Philadelphia, **U.S. National Championships**, (**2**)
- (United States) Florence Bayard – Washington D.C., Wilmington, (**2**)
- (England) Beatrice Wood – Darlington, Ilkley, (**2**)
- (United States) Ellen Roosevelt – Hastings-on-Hudson, New Hamburg (**2**)
- (Dominion of Ceylon) Miss. I. J. Watson – Nuwara Eliya (**1**)
- (Australia) Lilian Scott – Sydney (**1**)
- (Scotland) Miss Rose – Pollokshields (**1**)
- (United States) Ellen M. Lynch – Flushing (**1**)
- (United States) Miss Locke – New York City (**1**)
- (Ireland) Louisa Martin – Cheltenham (**1**)
- (United Kingdom) Florence Noon – Nottingham (**1**)
- (Colony of Natal) Mabel Grant – Pietermaritzburg (**1**)
- (England) Alice Pickering – Leamington Spa (**1**)
- (United Kingdom) Agnes Noon Watts – Stafford (**1**)
- (United Kingdom) Francesca Brown – Ealing (**1**)
- (United Kingdom) Lydia Cheetham – Keswick (**1**)
- (United Kingdom) Ivy Arbuthnot – East Grinstead (**1**)
- (Scotland) Jane Meikle – St Andrews (**1**)
- (United Kingdom) Nellie Turner – Felixstowe (**1**)
- (United Kingdom) Miss Norman – Saxmundham (**1**)
- (United Kingdom) Miss Mockler – Torquay (**1**)
- (United States) E. K. Lente – Southampton (**1**)
- (Scotland) E Malcolm – Moffat (**1**)
- (Ireland) Miss. A. Weldon – Naas (**1**)
- (Canada) Frances Arrowsmith – Victoria (**1**)
- (Canada) Miss F. Adams – Winnipeg (**1**)
- (United States) Miss Gilliland – Santa Monica (**1**)
- (United States) Miss Clarkson – Rumson (**1**)
- (United Kingdom) Miss Triscott – Chingford, (**1**)
- (Ireland) May Langrishe – Bournemouth (**1**)
- (Ireland) Lena Rice – Armagh (**1**)
- (United Kingdom) L. Chatterton-Clarke – Sheffield (**1**)
- (United Kingdom) Miss Knock – Boulogne-sur-Mer (**1**)
- (Australia) Miss Earle – Brisbane (**1**)
- (Netherlands) E. van de Poll – Wijk aan Zee (**1**)
- (Australia) Ellen Mayne – Melbourne (**1**)
- (New Zealand) E. Gordon – Napier (**1**)

== Statistical summary ==
=== Singles ===
- Total Tournaments (65)
- Most Titles: (England) Blanche Hillyard (7)
- Most Finals: (England) Blanche Hillyard (9)
- Most Matches Played: (England) Blanche Hillyard (31)
- Most Matches Won: (England) Blanche Hillyard (27)
- Match Winning %: (England) Blanche Hillyard (87.09%)
- Most Tournaments Played: (England) Blanche Hillyard (11)

== Sources ==
- Bartlett, Michael and Gillen, Bob. (1981) The Tennis Book, edited by Michael Bartlett and Bob Gillen, Arbor House, New York, ISBN 0-87795-344-9
- Collins, Bud. Total Tennis:The Ultimate Tennis Encyclopedia, Sport Classic Books, Toronto, Canada, ISBN 0-9731443-4-3.
- Garcia, Gabriel. "Season: 1888". The Tennis Base. Madrid, Spain: Tennismem SAL.
- Hall, Valentine Gill. (1889). Lawn Tennis in America: Biographical Sketches of All the Prominent Players ... Knotty Points, and All the Latest Rules and Directions Governing Handicaps, Umpires, and Rules for Playing. D.W. Granbery & Company. Boston.
- Hughes, G.P. Dunlop Lawn Tennis Almanack And Tournament Guide, G.P. Hughes
- Lowe, Sir F. Gordon. Lowe's Lawn Tennis Annuals and Compendia, Eyre & Spottiswoode. London, England.
- Someren, Janine van (December 2010). "3: The Amateur Tennis Circuit". Women's Sporting Lives: A biographical study of elite amateur tennis players at Wimbledon. A thesis for the degree of Doctor of Philosophy. Southampton, England: University of Southampton Research Repository.
- Wallis Myers A. Ayre's Lawn Tennis Almanack And Tournament Guide, London, England.
