= 1884 women's tennis season =

1884 Women's tennis season
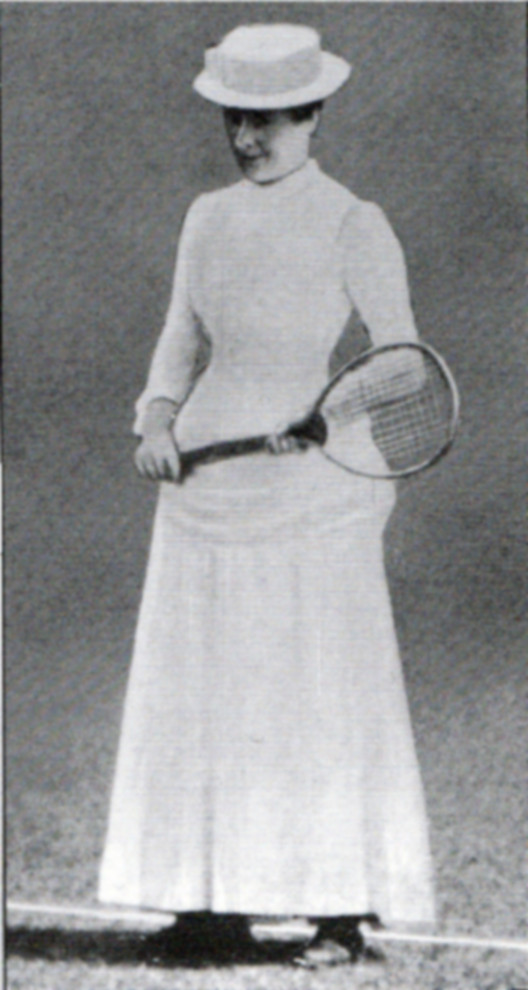
- Maud Watson is singles title leader this year

Details
- Duration: 6 March – 19 December
- Edition: 9th
- Tournaments: 33 (Amateur)
- Categories: Important (3); National (0); Provincial/Regional/State (6); County (5); Regular (24)

Achievements (singles)
- Most titles: (England) Maud Watson (4)
- Most finals: (England) Maud Watson (4)

The 1884 Women's tennis season was a tennis circuit composed of 33 national, regional, county, and regular tournaments. The season began in March in Brooklyn, United States, and ended in December in Melbourne, Australia.

== Season summary ==
Prior to the creation of the International Lawn Tennis Federation and the establishment of its world championship events in 1913 the Wimbledon Championships, the U.S. National Championships, the Irish Lawn Tennis Championships and the Northern Championships were considered by players and historians as the four most important tennis tournaments to win.

1884 sees a slight expansion in the number women's singles events being held as the tennis circuit continues to grow. In March the 23rd Regiment Armory Indoors tournament is held at the 23rd Regiment Armory in Brooklyn is the first indoor wood court tournament for women held in the United States, the event is won by Bessie Hazard.

In May 1884 at the first major event of the year the Irish Championships in Dublin, Ireland. In the women's singles final holder Ireland's May Langrishe is defeated by England's Maud Watson. Watson also claims the mixed doubles title with William Renshaw against Ireland's Connie Butler and Scotlands John Galbraith Horn. In terms of draw size the West of England Championships was the largest tournament of the year with a draw of 46 across three events.

In June 1884 at the second major tournament of the year the Northern Championships in Liverpool England's Edith Davies achieves a clean sweep winning singles title against Margaret Bracewell, she also picks up the doubles title with Miss Eckersley defeating sisters Annie and Lottie Dod, and the mixed doubles title paired with Ireland's Ernest Browne. In July in South Africa the first major women's tournament the Natal Championships is played in Pietermaritzburg, and in South East Asia the Singapore Cricket Club establishes a ladies lawn tennis club who stage a tournament later in December.

At the 1884 Wimbledon Championships the world's first major tennis tournament women's championships events are staged for the first time, in the singles competition Maud Watson defeats her sister Lilian Watson to claim the very first ladies championship event. At the U.S. National Championships there was still no women's championship events held.

In Australasia the first singles tournaments for women are held. In October the Carisbrook tournament in Dunedin, New Zealand is staged for the first time. In December the first Victorian Championships for women is held in Melbourne, Australia and played on asphalt courts. In 1913 the International Lawn Tennis Federation was created, that consisted of national member associations. The ILTF through its associated members then became responsible for supervising women's tour events.

== Results ==
Notes 1: Challenge Round: the final round of a tournament, in which the winner of a single-elimination phase faces the previous year's champion, who plays only that one match. The challenge round was used in the early history of tennis (from 1877 through 1921), in some tournaments not all.

* Indicates challenge round final

Key

Important.
National
Provincial/State/Regional
County
Regular

=== Singles ===
Results included:.

Tournaments (30)
| # | Date end | Tournament | Location | Surface | Winner | Finalist | Score |
|---|---|---|---|---|---|---|---|
| 1. | 6-Mar-1884 | 23d Regiment Armory Indoors | Brooklyn | Wood (i) | (United States) Bessie Hazard | (United States) Miss N. Hanly | 6–3, 5–6, 6–4 |
| 2. | 24-May-1884 | Irish Championships | Dublin | Grass | (England) Maud Watson | (Ireland) May Langrishe | 6–3, 6–2, 6–2 |
| 3. | 24-May-1884 | Whitehouse Open | Edinburgh | Grass | (Scotland) Jane Meikle | (Scotland) Julia Ferguson | 10–8, 6–2 |
| 4. | 31-May-1884 | West of England Championships | Bath | Grass | (England) Edith Davies | (Ireland) Lilian Cole | 6–4, 6–4 |
| 5. | 10-Jun-1884 | Waterloo Tournament | Liverpool | Grass | (England) Margaret Bracewell | (England) E. Gordon | 6–4, 4–6, 6–4, 6–1 |
| 6. | 14-Jun-1884 | East Gloucestershire Championships | Cheltenham | Grass | (England) Edith Davies | (Ireland) Louisa Martin | 3–6, 6–5, 6–3 |
| 7. | 19-Jun-1884 | Northern Championships | Liverpool | Grass | (England) Edith Davies | (England) Margaret Bracewell | 2–6, 6–4, 6–4 |
| 8. | 21-Jun-1884 | London Athletic Club Tournament | Stamford Bridge | Grass | (England) Maud Watson | (England) Edith Cole | 6–4, 6–2, 2–6, 6–1 |
| 9. | 26-Jun-1884 | Ealing LTC Championship | Ealing | Grass | (England) Mrs. Streetern | (England) Charlotte Cooper | 6–4, 4–6, 6–5 |
| 10. | 1-Jul-1884 | Kilkenny County and City Tournament | Kilkenny | Grass | (Ireland) Mabel Cahill | (Ireland) May Langrishe | 6–4, 6–4 |
| 11. | 5-Jul-1884 | Natal Championships | Pietermaritzburg | Grass | (Colony of Natal) Miss. Pearson | (Colony of Natal) L. Button | 6–0, 6–0, 3–6, 7–5 |
| 12. | 18-Jul-1884 | Hull Westbourne Avenue Tournament | Hull | Grass | (England) Mabel Boulton | (England) E.D. Ramsey | 6–0, 7–5 |
| 13. | 19-Jul-1884 | Wimbledon Championships | London | Grass | (England) Maud Watson | (England) Lilian Watson | 6–8, 6–3, 6–3 |
| 14. | 25-Jul-1884 | Midland Counties Championships | Edgbaston | Grass | (England) Miss Noon | (England) E Richardson | 3–6, 8–6, 6–3 |
| 15. | 2-Aug-1884 | Chiswick Park Tournament | Chiswick Park | Grass | (England) Blanche Bingley | (England) Miss Wing | 6–3, 6–3 |
| 16. | 9-Aug-1884 | Exmouth Open | Exmouth | Grass | (England) Maud Watson | (England) Agnes Watts | 6–1, 7–5, 6–3 |
| 17. | 16-Aug-1884 | North Yorkshire Tournament | Scarborough | Grass | (England) Constance Hodgson | (England) Beatrice Wood | 7–5, 6–3 |
| 18. | 16-Aug-1884 | East Grinstead Open | East Grinstead | Grass | (United Kingdom) Miss Cobbold | (United Kingdom) Ada Strapp | 6–1, 6–4 |
| 19. | 21-Aug-1884 | Saxmundham Lawn Tennis Tournament | Saxmundham | Grass | (England) May Marriott | (United Kingdom) G. Rant | 6–1, 6–1 |
| 20. | 23-Aug-1884 | Derbyshire Championships | Buxton | Grass | (England) Agnes Watts | (Ireland) Florence Stanuell | 6–1, 6–2 |
| 21. | 23-Aug-1884 | South of Scotland Championships | Moffat | Grass | (Scotland) Jane Meikle | (Scotland) Lottie Paterson | 6–3, 6–4 |
| 22. | 23-Aug-1884 | Whitby Open Lawn Tennis Tournament | Whitby | Grass | (United Kingdom) L. Cheetham | (United Kingdom) A.J. Osmond | 6–3, 6–4 |
| 23. | 30-Aug-1884 | St. Paul Open | Saint Paul | Grass | (United States) Miss Napier | (United States) Miss K. Gilman | 2–1 sets |
| 24. | 5-Sep-1884 | Bournemouth Lawn Tennis Club Tournament | Bournemouth | Grass | (England) F. Davies | (England) Mrs Hornby | 3–6, 6–2, 6–5 |
| 25. | 6-Sep-1884 | South of England Championships | Eastbourne | Grass | (England) Frances Burton | (England) Nellie Burton | 6–2, 6–4 |
| 26. | 27-Sep-1884 | Sussex County Lawn Tennis Tournament | Brighton | Grass | (England) M. Leslie | (England) Eva Adshead | def.? |
| 27. | 16-Oct-1884 | Carisbrook Tournament | Dunedin | Grass | (New Zealand) F. E. Maitland | (New Zealand) ? | Won |
| 29. | 19-Dec-1884 | Victorian Championships | Melbourne | Asphalt | (Australia) E. MacKenzie | (Australia) A. Bayles | 10-4 (games) |
| 30. | Dec-1884 | Singapore Ladies LTC Tournament | Singapore | Grass | results unknown | ditto | ditto |

== Tournament winners ==
=== Singles ===
This is list of winners sorted by number of singles titles (major titles in bold)

- (England) Maud Watson (4) Exmouth, **Irish Championships**, **Wimbledon Championships**, Stamford Bridge.
- (England) Edith Davies (3) Bath, Cheltenham, **Northern Championships**
- (Scotland) Jane Meikle (2) Edinburgh, Moffat
- (United States) Bessie Hazard (1) Brooklyn
- (United Kingdom) Margaret Bracewell (1) Liverpool
- (England) Mrs. Streetern (1) Ealing
- (Ireland) Mabel Cahill (1) Kilkenny
- (Colony of Natal) Miss. Pearson (1) Pietermaritzburg
- (England) Mabel Boulton (1) Hull
- (England) Miss Noon (1) Edgbaston
- (England) Blanche Bingley (1) Chiswick Park
- (England) Constance Hodgson (1) Scarborough
- (United Kingdom) Miss Cobbold (1) East Grinstead
- (England) May Marriott (1) Saxmundham
- (England) Agnes Watts (1) Buxton
- (United Kingdom) L. Cheetham (1) Whitby
- (United States) Miss Napier (1) St. Paul
- (England) F. Davies (1) Bournemouth
- (England) Frances Burton (1) Eastbourne
- (England) M. Leslie (1) Brighton
- (New Zealand) F. E. Maitland (1) Dunedin
- (Australia) E. MacKenzie (1) Melbourne

=== Doubles ===
This is list of winners sorted by number of doubles titles (major titles in bold) Davies, Eckersley, Mardall and Watts won titles with different partners.

- (England) Edith Davies & (England) Miss Eckersley/ (England) Florence Mardall (**4**) Bath, Cheltenham, Edgbaston, **Northern Championships**.
- (England) Florence Mardall & (England) Edith Davies (**3**) Bath, Cheltenham, Edgbaston
- (England) Miss Eckersley & (United Kingdom) Margaret Bracewell/ (England) Edith Davies (**2**) Liverpool II, **Northern Championships**
- (England) Agnes Watts & (England) Effie Noon/ (England) Miss Noon (**2**) Buxton, Exmouth.
- (Ireland) Adela Langrishe & (Ireland) May Langrishe (**1**) **Irish Championships**.
- (England) Margaret Bracewell & (England) Miss Eckersley (**1**) Liverpool II.
- (England) Lilian Watson & (England) Maud Watson (**1**) Edgbaston.
- (England) Effie Noon & (England) Agnes Watts (**1**) Exmouth.
- (Australia) Annie Riddell & (Australia) M. Rose (**1**) Melbourne
- (United Kingdom) A. Turner & (United Kingdom) Miss Turner (**1**) Scarborough.
- (United Kingdom) Miss Cobbold & (United Kingdom) Miss Richardson (**1**) East Grinstead.
- (England) Miss Noon & (England) Agnes Watts (**1**) Buxton.
- (England) A. Foster & (United Kingdom) G. Rant (**1**) Saxmundham.
- (United Kingdom) Miss Mockler & (United Kingdom) Miss Skirrow (**1**) Bournemouth.
- (England) Blanche Bingley & (United Kingdom) M. Leslie (**1**) Brighton.

=== Mixed doubles ===
This is list of winners sorted by number of mixed doubles titles (major titles in bold)

- (England) Maud Watson & (England) William Renshaw/ (United Kingdom) John Redfern Deykin (**2**) Exmouth, **Irish Championships**.
- (England) Florence Mardall & (United Kingdom) Charles Gostling/ (United Kingdom) John Redfern Deykin (**2**) Bath, Edgbaston.
- (United States) Miss Hanly & (United States) Mr. Hough (**1**) Brooklyn.
- (United Kingdom) Margaret Bracewell & (United Kingdom) J. Bruce Ismay (**1**) Liverpool II.
- (England) Edith Davies & (Ireland) Ernest Browne (**1**) **Northern Championships**.
- (England) Miss Noon & (United Kingdom) Frank Noon (**1**) Leamington.
- (United Kingdom) Marian Bradshaw & (United Kingdom) Herbert Wilberforce (**1**) Darlington.
- (United Kingdom) Miss Bourchier & (United Kingdom) Donald Stewart (**1**) Chiswick Park.
- (United Kingdom) Ellen Ramsay & (Ireland) Ernest Browne (**1**) Scarborough.
- (England) Miss Taylor & (England) William Renshaw (**1**) East Grinstead.
- (Ireland) Lilian Cole & (England) Charles E. Pine-Coffin (**1**) Teignmouth.
- (England) Ethel Surtees & (England) Charles Grinstead (**1**) Buxton.
- (England) Miss Burnand & (United Kingdom) E.M. Hansell (**1**) Saxmundham.
- (United Kingdom) D. Radcliffe & (United Kingdom) John Charles Kay (**1**) Whitby.
- (England) Blanche Bingley & (England) E. Barratt-Smith (**1**) Brighton.
- (Australia) Annie Riddel & (Australia) Walter J. Riddell (**1**) Melbourne.
- (Australia) Annie Lamb & (Australia) Mr Cropper (**1**) Sydney.

== Statistical summary ==
=== Singles ===
- Total Tournaments (30)
- Most Titles: (England) Maud Watson (4)
- Most Finals: (England) Maud Watson (4)
- Most Matches Played: (England) Maud Watson (15)
- Most Matches Won: (England) Maud Watson (15)
- Match Winning %: (England) Maud Watson (100%)
- Most Tournaments Played: (England) Maud Watson (4)

=== Doubles ===
- Total Tournaments: (14)
- Most Titles: (England) Edith Davies (4)
- Most Finals: (England) Edith Davies (4)

=== Mix Doubles ===
- Total Tournaments: (20)
- Most Titles: (England) Florence Mardall / (England) Maud Watson (2)
- Most Finals: (England) Florence Mardall / (England) Maud Watson (2)
