= Archibald Thomson =

Scottish tennis player

- Full name: Archibald A.Thomson
- Country (sports): Scotland
- Born: 21 July 1856 Alloa, Clackmannanshire, Scotland
- Died: 11 November 1911 (aged 55) Alloa, Clackmannanshire, Scotland
- Turned pro: 1880 (amateur)
- Retired: 1894

Singles
- Career record: 80–33
- Career titles: 10

Grand Slam singles results
- Wimbledon: 2R (1885)

Archibald A.Thomson (16 April 1860 – 10 September 1925) was a Scottish tennis player who competed at the Wimbledon Championships 1885 and 1890. He was also known as Lobby Thompson amongst other tennis players of the time, He was a two time finalist at the Scottish Championships in 1885 and 1886. and a semi finalist at the Northern Championships in 1887. He was active from 1880 to 1894 and won 10 career singles titles.

== Career ==
Archibald A.Thomson was born in Alloa, Clackmannanshire, Scotland on 21 July 1856. He attended the University of Edinburgh.

He played and won his first tournament at the Dirleton Castle LTC Tournament in 1880. He won his first title at the Bridge of Allan Open in Bridge of Allan in 1884. He competed in the men's singles events at the Wimbledon Championships in 1885 where he lost in the second round to the American player James Dwight. At the 1890 championships he lost the first round to Herbert Lawford.

His main career singles title successes came at the South of Scotland Championships at Moffat which he won two times consecutively (1885–1886), and the Whitehouse Open two times consecutively (1889–1890), He also won the singles title at the Broughty Ferry Open (1886), the Edinburgh International Exhibition Tournament (1886), the Inverkip Rovers Closed Championships (1887) and the Inverkip Rovers Open also in 1887.

In addition he was a losing finalist at the West of Scotland Championships (1882), and the Windyknowe Open (1883), and the West of Scotland Championships (1894). Archibald played his final singles event at the Scottish Border Championships in 1894.
