= Herbert Bowes-Lyon =

British tennis player

- Country (sports): GBR
- Born: 8 October 1860 Glamis Castle, Angus, Scotland
- Died: 14 April 1897 (age 36) Bordighera, Imperia, Liguria, Italy
- Turned pro: 1882 (amateur tour)
- Retired: 1888

Singles
- Career record: 53-13
- Career titles: 8

Grand Slam singles results
- Wimbledon: QF (1887)

Herbert Bowes-Lyon (15 August 1860 – 14 April 1897) was a Scottish tennis player and barrister, and uncle of Elizabeth Bowes-Lyon, mother of Queen Elizabeth II. He was a quarter finalist in the men's singles at the 1887 Wimbledon Championships, and a two time finalist at the Scottish Championships (1886, 1888). Herbert played 8 consecutive seasons from 1882 to 1888, and won 8 singles titles.

== Career ==
Herbert played and won his first tournament in 1882 at the Biarritz Lawn Tennis Club tournament (later known as the Biarritz Championships) where he defeated Frederick de Moleyns in the final. In 1887 he reached the quarter-finals of the Wimbledon Championships, lost to Harry Grove in straight sets. In 1888 he won his final title at the Whitehouse Open in Edinburgh. In 1889 he played his final tournament at the Scottish Championships where he was beaten by Ireland's Ernest Browne in the quarter-finals.

His career singles highlights included winning the Whitehouse Open four times (1885, 1886, 1887, 1888), the Edinburgh University LTC Tournament two times (1885, 1886) and the Warriston Park LTC Tournament in 1886. In addition he was a losing finalist at the Scottish Championships (1886, 1888), the Northumberland Championships (1887) and the Darlington Association Tournament (1888).

== Family ==
The sixth of seven sons and one of the eleven children of Claude Bowes-Lyon, 13th Earl of Strathmore and Kinghorne and of Frances Dora Smith, His younger brother Patrick Bowes-Lyon also played tennis competitively, he never married. He died at the age of 36 in Bordighera, Imperia, Liguria, Italy. His body was returned to Glamis Castle in Scotland and buried there on 24 April 1897.

== Work ==
Herbert Bowes-Lyon qualified in law and became a barrister.
