= Jane Meikle =

Scottish Tennis Player

- Country (sports): SCO
- Born: c. 1860 Earlston, Berwickshire, Scotland
- Died: Unknown Scotland
- Turned pro: 1883 (amateur tour)
- Retired: 1888

Singles
- Career titles: 7

Grand Slam singles results
- Wimbledon: QF (1885)

Mixed doubles
- Career record: 8-1
- Career titles: 1

Jane Meikle born (1860 – ?) was a Scottish tennis player. She was a quarter finalist at the 1885 Wimbledon Championships. She was active from 1883 to 1888 and won 7 career singles titles.

== Career ==
Jane was born circa 1860 in Earlston, Berwickshire, Scotland. She competed mainly in Scotland and played her first tournament in 1883 the South of Scotland Championships at Moffat which she won against a Miss. A. Forest. In major tournaments she played only one time at the 1885 Wimbledon Championships where she reached the quarter finals stage, but was beaten by England's Edith Gurney.

In 1884 she successfully defended her South Scotland title winning for the second time against Lottie Paterson. She won the Whitehouse Open in Edinburgh three times consecutively from 1884 to 1886. In 1886 she won the inaugural West of Scotland Championships at Pollokshields against Julia McKenzie the same year she reached final of the Whitehouse Open for the fourth year but was beten by England's Mabel Boulton, that year she won the mixed doubles title at the Warriston Park LTC Tournament partnering J.P. Smythe against Mabel Boulton and Richard Millar Watson.

In June 1888 at the Whitehouse Open she reached the final of the mixed doubles event with her sister, but they were beaten by England's Annie Dod (sister of Lottie Dod) and Scotland's James Ferguson. In August 1888 she played her final tournament at the East of Scotland Championships in St Andrews where she won the singles title, and was a losing finalist in the women's doubles event.
