= Burnham-on-Sea Championships =

Defunct tennis tournament
- Tour: ILTF
- Founded: 1927; 98 years ago
- Abolished: 1980; 45 years ago
- Location: Burnham-on-Sea, Somerset, England.
- Venue: Avenue Lawn Tennis Club
- Surface: Grass/Hard

The Burnham-on-Sea Championships was a men's and women's grass court (then later hard court) tennis tournament founded as the Burnham-on-Sea Open in 1927 at the Avenue Tennis Club, Burnham-on-Sea, Somerset, England. The tournament ran annually until 1980.

== History ==
In 1922 a Burnham-on-Sea tournament was established at the Avenue Tennis Club, Burnham-on-Sea, Somerset, England, that was a closed tournament only. In 1927, that tournament became an open event called the Burnham-on-Sea Open. When this tournament was staged, it was usually held in conjunction with the Somerset Championships. The tournament was branded as the Burnham-on-Sea Open until the mid-1970s when it was renamed the Burnham-on-Sea Championships. The tournament was staged until 1980 when it was discontinued.

== Location and Venues ==
The tournament was at the Avenue Tennis Club, Burnham-on-Sea, Somerset, England. The club was founded in 1909 and consists of 7 grass courts and 3 shale courts.
