= Broughty Ferry Open =

Defunct tennis tournament
- Founded: 1884
- Abolished: 1929
- Location: Broughty Ferry, Dundee, Angus, Scotland
- Venue: Broughty Ferry LTC
- Surface: Clay

The Broughty Ferry Open was a late Victorian era clay court tennis tournament first staged in 1884 in Broughty Ferry, Dundee, Angus, Scotland. The tournament ran until 1929.

== History ==
The Broughty Ferry Open was a clay court tennis tournament organised by the Broughty Ferry LTC, Broughty Ferry, Dundee, Angus, Scotland from 1884 to 1929.

== Finals ==
=== Singles ===
Year	Winners	Runners-up	Score
1884	(Scotland) James Black	(Scotland) Michael Findlay	def.
1885	(Scotland) M. Brown	(Scotland) George Stennouse	6-2, 4-6, 8-6, 6-8, 6-2
1886	(Scotland) Archibald Thomson	(Scotland) J.B. Gray	6-1, 6-1, 6-3
1887	(England) Arthur Story	(Scotland) Alfred Aitken Thomson	1-6, 6-4, retd.
1888	(Scotland) Alfred Aitken Thomson	(England) Arthur Story	6-3, 8-6, 3-6, 7-5
