= Burton-on-Trent Open =

Defunct tennis tournament
- Founded: 1883; 142 years ago
- Abolished: 1905; 120 years ago
- Location: Burton upon Trent, East Staffordshire, England
- Venue: Ind Coope Ground
- Surface: Grass

The Burton-on-Trent Open also called the Burton-on-Trent Open Tennis Tournament was a men's and women's grass court tennis tournament founded in August 1883. It was first staged at the Ind Coope Ground at Burton upon Trent, East Staffordshire, England and ran till 1905 when it was abolished.

== History ==
The Burton-on-Trent Open was a men's and women's grass court tennis tournament founded in August 1883. The tournament was held through to 1939 when it was abolished. The gentlemen's singles competed for the Ratcliff Challenge Cup. In 1884 there was two editions of this tournament one in the spring won by Frank Seymour Noon and the other in the summer won by Walter Chamberlain. Other former winners of the men's singles included: Henry Guy Nadin, Edward Roy Allen and Sydney Howard Smith. Previous women's singles title winners included: Hilda Lane, Violet Pinckney and Alice Pickering.

== Venue ==
The tournament was held on the Ind Coope Ground, Burton-upon-Trent throughout its duration, Ind Coope & Co's were a local brewery firm that also provided some of the tournaments prizes. The Ind Coope Ground was also used by Staffordshire County Cricket Club.
