= Flushing Athletic Club Championship =

Defunct tennis tournament
- Tour: USNLTA Circuit (1988–1900)
- Founded: 1888; 138 years ago
- Abolished: 1891; 135 years ago
- Location: Flushing, Queens, New York City, United States
- Venue: Flushing Athletic Club
- Surface: Grass

The Flushing Athletic Club Championship was a men's and women's grass court tennis tournament founded in 1888 as the Flushing Athletic Club Open also known as the Flushing Spring Tournament was a sanctioned event of the United States National Lawn Tennis Association. The tournament was held at the Flushing Athletic Club, Flushing, Queens, New York City, United States.

== History ==
In 1888 the first edition of the Flushing Athletic Club Open was held. That tournament was a United States National Lawn Tennis Association sanctioned event. The tournament ran annually till 1891 as part of the USNLTA Circuit when it was dropped from that schedule.

== Finals ==
=== Men's singles ===
Year	Champion	Runner up	Score
1888	(United States) A.W. Post	(United States) Clarence Hobart	6–1, 1–6, 7–5, 6–1.
1889	(United States) Clarence Hobart	(United States) Oliver Samuel Campbell	6–3, 4–6, 6–4, 6–4.
1890	(United States) Henry Slocum	(United States) Clarence Hobart	3–6, 3–6, 6–2, 6–4, 6-4
1891	(United States) Edward Ludlow Hall	(United States) Henry Slocum	6-4, 5–7, 6–2, 6-4

=== Women's singles ===
(incomplete roll)

Year	Champion	Runner up	Score
1888	(United States) Miss Ellen M. Lynch	(United States) Miss Ward	6–3, 6–3, 6–3.
1889	(United States) Adeline Robinson	(United States) Miss Ellen M. Lynch	6–4, 4–6, 6–3, 6–2.
1890	(United States) Miss Ellen M. Lynch	(United States) ?	?
1891	(United States) Miss Ellen M. Lynch	(United States) Miss Jane Ryerson	6-2, 4–6, 5–6, 6–4, 6–3.
