= Frank Noon (tennis) =

British tennis player (1865–1932)

- Full name: Frank Seymour Noon
- Country (sports): GBR
- Born: March 1865; Blaby, Leicestershire, England
- Died: September 1932 (age 67); Eastry, Kent, England
- Turned pro: 1883 (amateur tour)
- Retired: 1893

Singles
- Career record: 97–39
- Career titles: 9

Frank Seymour Noon (March 1865 – September 1932) was an English tennis player during the Victorian era. He was active from 1883 to 1893 and won 9 career singles titles.

== Tennis career ==
Frank Seymour Noon was born in Blaby, Leicestershire, England in March 1865. In 1883 he played his first event at Teignmouth and Shaldon Open where he reached the quarter finals. He won his first singles titles at the Burton-on-Trent Spring Open in 1884. His other career singles highlights include winning the Staffordshire Lawn Tennis Tournament (1886), Midland Counties Championships (1886), Nottinghamshire County Cricket Club (1887), Staffordshire Lawn Tennis Tournament (1887), Market Harborough Open Championship (1889–90), Darlington Open (1889), the Northumberland Championships (1889) and the Darlington Open (1890).

In addition he was a losing finalist at the Midland Counties Championships (1887), Nottinghamshire County Cricket Club (1888), Leicester Open (1888), Leamington Open Tournament (1889), Norton Lawn Tennis Open Tournament (1889), and the Warwickshire Championships (1890). Between 1891 and 1893 he left for the United States to play on the USNLTA Eastern Circuit where he competed in the Longwood Challenge Bowl. He reached the semi-finals of the 1891 edition, but lost to Philip Shelton Sears. He was a quarter finalist at the 1892 edition losing to Frederick Hovey. He played his final tournament at the prestigious Longwood Bowl tournament in the United States in 1893 where he lost Valentine Gill Hall.

Noon died in September 1932 at Eastry, Kent, England age 67.
