= Leamington Open =

Defunct tennis tournament
- Tour: Amateur
- Founded: 1882
- Abolished: 1931
- Editions: 49
- Location: Leamington Spa, Warwickshire, England
- Venue: Leamington Lawn Tennis Club
- Surface: outdoor (grass)

The Leamington Open was a men's and women's grass court tennis tournament held at Leamington Spa, Warwickshire, England founded in 1882 it ran annually until 1931 as part of the pre-open era tennis tour. It was founded on 1 August 1882 as the Royal Leamington Lawn Tennis Tournament.

== History ==
The Leamington Open Tournament was established on 1 August 1882, and first staged at Jephson Gardens. At the same meeting held in August 1882, a dual tournament called the Warwickshire Championships (1882–1938) was staged.

At the inaugural event, the first men's all comers singles champion was England's Robert Wallace Braddell (son of Sir Thomas Braddell), who defeated Edward Lake Williams in 3 straight sets. The all comers mixed doubles title was won by Erskine Gerald Watson and his sister Maud Watson.

The tournament continued separately to that of the county championship until 1931. Formers men's winners of this event include Charles Walder Grinstead (1883) and Cotah Ramaswami (1920).

== Finals ==
=== Men's Singles ===
Incomplete roll

Year	Champions	Runners-up	Score
1882	(United Kingdom) Robert Wallace Braddell	(United Kingdom) Teddy Williams	7-5 6-2 6-3
1883	(United Kingdom) Charles Walder Grinstead	(United Kingdom) Herbert Wilberforce	8-6 3-6 6-3 3-6 6-3
1884	(United Kingdom) Teddy Williams	(United Kingdom) Frank Seymour Noon	6-3 6-2 6-2
1885	(United States) James Dwight	(Ireland) Alfred Henry Betham	6-1 6-3 6-0
1886	(Ireland) Alfred Henry Betham	(United Kingdom) Harry Grove	8-6 8-6 6-4
1889	(United Kingdom) Charles Gladstone Eames	(United Kingdom) Francis Seymour Noon	4–6, 6–1, 6–2, 3–6, 7–5
1909	(United Kingdom) Neville Gard Deed	(United Kingdom) William Caleb Wood Curtis	9-7, 6-2
1920	(British Raj) Cotah Ramaswami	(United Kingdom) John Cecil F. Masterman	walkover
1931	(United Kingdom) Henry Woolf Standring	(United Kingdom) R.L. Tower	6-4, 6-2

=== Mixed Doubles ===
Incomplete roll

Year	Champions	Runners-up	Score
1884	(United Kingdom) Frank Noon (United Kingdom) Effie Noon	(Ireland) Alfred Betham (United Kingdom) Miss Exham	6-2, 6-4, 6-1
1886	(United Kingdom) Charles Ross (United Kingdom) Mrs Hornby	(United Kingdom) Thomas Mellersh (United Kingdom) Gertrude Mellersh	6-2, 6-3

== Sources ==
- Nieuwland, Alex. "Tournament – Leamington. www.tennisarchives.com. A. Nieuwland.
- Routledges Sporting Annual (1883) George Routledge and Son. London.
- Warwickshire County Tennis Championships. Leamington Lawn Tennis & Squash Club". lltsc.co.uk.
