= North Riding Championships =

Defunct tennis tournament
- Founded: 1884; 142 years ago
- Abolished: 1902; 124 years ago
- Location: Whitby, North Riding of Yorkshire, England.
- Venue: Congress Hall Grounds; West Cliff Lawn Tennis Courts
- Surface: Grass

The North Riding Championships was men's and women's grass court tournament founded in 1884 as the Whitby Open Lawn Tennis Tournament. The tournament was organsised by Whitby Lawn Tennis Club, and first played at the Congress Hall Grounds, Whitby, North Riding of Yorkshire, England. until 1902.

== History ==
The Whitby Tournament was an outdoor grass court men's and women's tennis event established in 1884 at Whitby, North Riding of Yorkshire, England. In 1887 the Whitby Open also featured the Yorkshire Lawn Tennis Championships that year. In 1892 this main event the Whitby Open was renamed the North Riding Championships, after which the Whitby Open was the umbrella name for a series of tournaments. This event was then staged annually until 1902 when it was discontinued. The men's singles title was won by a G.W. Brook who defeated H. Anderson.

The tournament also featured some notable Wimbledon players such as Marmaduke Strickland Constable the 1883 singles quarter finalist, George Richmond Mewburn and Edward Fletcher the 1885 Northern Championships singles semi finalist. Margaret Bracewell a Yorkshire born player and winner of the Yorkshire Championshships and Midland Counties Championships played mixed doubles at this event, she was also mixed doubles champion at the Irish Championships in with Ernest Wool Lewis.

== Venues ==
The first two editions were held at the Congress Hall Grounds, the Congress Hall was a wooden building with a capacity of 2000 people it was first constructed in York by the Church of Congress, then was transferred to Whity in 1867 and opened by the Constantine Phipps, the Earl Mulgrave. The 1886 edition was played on land belonging to Sir George Elliot, 1st Baronet. In 1887 and until the remainder of its run the tournament was staged at the West Cliff Lawn Tennis Courts.

== Finals ==
=== Men's Singles ===
Year	Winner	Finalist	Score
1884	(England) Arthur Godfrey Pease	(United Kingdom of Great Britain and Ireland) George E. Newby	6–5, 4–6, 3–6, 6–2, 6–5
1885	(United Kingdom of Great Britain and Ireland) James Herbert Crispe	(England) Arthur Godfrey Pease	3–6, 6–1, 6–3, 6–5
1886	(England) Philip Leslie Hirst	(United Kingdom of Great Britain and Ireland) George Reston Brewerton	6–0, ret.
1887	(United Kingdom of Great Britain and Ireland) Edward Fletcher	(United Kingdom of Great Britain and Ireland) George Reston Brewerton	6–3, 7–5, 9–7.
1892	(United Kingdom of Great Britain and Ireland) Frederick Bradbury	(United Kingdom of Great Britain and Ireland) Henry Guy Nadin	6–2, 2–6, 6–2, 6–0
1893	(United Kingdom of Great Britain and Ireland) Henry Caldecott	(United Kingdom of Great Britain and Ireland) Charles William-Wade	6–3, 2–6, 6–2
1895	(United Kingdom of Great Britain and Ireland) J.D. Weatherall	(United Kingdom of Great Britain and Ireland) George South	def.
1900	(United Kingdom of Great Britain and Ireland) Alexander H. Wolff	(United Kingdom of Great Britain and Ireland) John A. Wolff	6–2, 6–3, 6–2.

=== Men's Doubles ===
Year	Winner	Finalist	Score
1884	(England) Arthur Godfrey Pease (Ireland) J. Theo Richardson	(England) John Charles Kay (England) Harold Stapylton Greenwell	6–5, 6–1, 6–5
1885	(England) Arthur Godfrey Pease (England) George Richmond Mewburn	(United Kingdom of Great Britain and Ireland) James Herbert Crispe (United Kingdom of Great Britain and Ireland) Leonard William Greenwell	6–5, 6–1, 6–5
1886	(England) Arthur Godfrey Pease (United Kingdom of Great Britain and Ireland) W.S. Wright	(England) Francis Joseph Hirst (England) Philip Leslie Hirst	6–5, 6–1, 6–5
1887	(England) George Richmond Mewburn (England) Arthur Godfrey Pease	(United Kingdom of Great Britain and Ireland) } James Baldwin (United Kingdom of Great Britain and Ireland) M. Pole	6–1, 10–12, 6–4, 7–5

=== Women's Singles ===
Year	Winner	Finalist	Score
1884	(England) L. Cheetham	(England) A.J. Osmond	6–3, 6–4

=== Mixed Doubles ===
Year	Winner	Finalist	Score
1884	(England) John Charles Kay (England) Miss D. Radcliffe	(United Kingdom of Great Britain and Ireland) C. Richardson (United Kingdom of Great Britain and Ireland) Miss L. Cheetham	6–0, 6–3
1885	(England) Arthur Godfrey Pease (England) Miss Wood	(England) George Richmond Mewburn (England) Miss Scott	6–3, 6–1
1886	(England) Wilfrid T. Rivett-Carnac (England) Miss Walters	(England) A. Herbert (England) Miss Wood	6–3, 6–1
1887	(England) Francis Joseph Hirst (England) Margaret Bracewell	(United Kingdom of Great Britain and Ireland) M. Pole (England) Miss Walters	8–6, 6–3

== See also ==
- Whitby
