= Somerset Championships =

Defunct tennis tournament
- Tour: ILTF
- Founded: 1881; 144 years ago
- Abolished: 1984; 41 years ago
- Location: Burnham-on-Sea; Taunton; Weston-super-Mare
- Venue: Various
- Surface: Grass

The Somerset Championships was a men's and women's international grass court tennis tournament founded as the West Somerset Archery and Lawn Tennis Tournament in 1881 at Taunton, Somerset, England. In 1888 it was elevated to a county level event and renamed the Somersetshire Championships. the tournament ran annually until 1984.

== History ==
In 1881 the West Somerset Archery and Lawn Tennis Society established a tennis tournament at Taunton, Somerset, England. In 1884 it was renamed as the Taunton and West Somerset Lawn Tennis Tournament. In 1888 that event became the Somersetshire Championships. In 1889 the tournament was renamed as the Somerset County Lawn Tennis Championships. The championships were staged annually until 1984. When this tournament was held in Burnham-on-Sea it was held in conjunction with the Burnham-on-Sea Championships.

== Location and Venues ==
The tournament was first held in Taunton at the West Somerset Lawn Tennis Club an associate club of the West Somerset Archery and Lawn Tennis Society, with later editions being held in Burnham-on-Sea at the Avenue Tennis Club and Weston-super-Mare, Somerset, England.
