= Whitehouse Open =

Defunct tennis tournament
- Founded: 1884; 141 years ago
- Abolished: 1898; 127 years ago
- Location: Edinburgh, Midlothian, Scotland
- Venue: Whitehouse Lawn Tennis Club
- Surface: Clay; Grass

The Whitehouse Open was a late Victorian era combined men's and women's tennis tournament played on both clay courts and grass courts organised by the Whitehouse Lawn Tennis Club, Edinburgh, Midlothian, Scotland. It was staged from 1884 to 1895.

== History ==
In May 1884 the Whitehouse Open Lawn Tennis Tournament staged for the first time at the Whitehouse Lawn Tennis Club, Edinburgh, Lothian, Scotland. The tournament was played on both clay courts and grass courts, and ran until 1899. The Whitehouse Tennis Club (as it's now called) was founded in 1881 was still operating in 2000.

== Finals ==
=== Men's Singles ===
Year	Winner	Runner-up	Score
1884	(England) Richard Henry Fuller	(Scotland) Archibald Thomson	6–4, 6–3, 6–3
1885	(Scotland) Herbert Bowes-Lyon	(England) Richard Henry Fuller	8–6, 11–13, 6–4, 6–3
1886	(Scotland) Herbert Bowes-Lyon (2)	(Scotland) George Nelson Stenhouse	6–1, 8–6, 6–1
1887	(Scotland) Herbert Bowes-Lyon (3)	(England) Arthur Nevile John Story	3–6, 6–3, 6–0, 6–2
1888	(Scotland) Herbert Bowes-Lyon (4)	(Scotland) Archibald Thomson	6–4, 6–3, 6–1
1889	(Scotland) Archibald Thomson	(England) Arthur Nevile John Story	6–4 ,6–4, 6–2
1890	(Scotland) Archibald Thomson (2)	(South Africa) Edward Barnard Fuller	4–6, 6–3, 6–0, 0–6, 6–1
1892	(United Kingdom) J.H. Conyers	(United Kingdom) E. Conyers	w.o.
1893	(Scotland) Henry Lawrence Fleming	(United Kingdom) J.H. Conyers	w.o.
1894	(Scotland) Richard Millar Watson	(Scotland) Henry Lawrence Fleming	w.o.
1895	(United Kingdom) D. Maxwell	(Scotland) Richard Millar Watson	6–4, 6–4, 6–2

=== Women's Singles ===
Incomplete Roll

Year	Winner	Runner-up	Score
1884	(Scotland) Jane Meikle	(Scotland) Julia Ferguson	6–2, 6–4
1885	(Scotland) Jane Meikle (2)	(Scotland) Julia Ferguson	6–0, 6–0
1886	(Scotland) Jane Meikle (3)	(Scotland) Miss Meilke	6–2, 6–2
1887	(England) Mabel Boulton	(Scotland) Jane Meikle	default
1888	(England) Annie Dod	(Scotland) J. Ferguson	6–2, 8–6
1889	(Scotland) Lottie Paterson	(England) Annie Dod	6–0, 6–2
1890	(Scotland) Lottie Paterson (2)	(England) Jane Corder	6–0, 8–6
1891	(Scotland) Lottie Paterson (3)	(England) Jane Corder	7–5, 6–2
1894	(Scotland) Mrs Kirkwood	?	?
1895	(Scotland) Louisa Stoltz	(Scotland) Mrs Kirkwood	default

== See also ==
- Tennis in Scotland
