= Edith Blake (tennis) =

British tennis player

- Country (sports): GBR
- Born: December 1861 Staines-upon-Thames Middlesex, England
- Died: September 1939 (age 77) Staines-upon-Thames Middlesex, England
- Turned pro: 1884 (amateur tour)
- Retired: 1890

Singles
- Career titles: 2

Grand Slam singles results
- Wimbledon: SF (1885)

Edith Blake née; Edith Gurney (December 1861 – September 1939) was an English tennis player. She was a semi finalist at the 1885 Wimbledon Championships. She was active from 1884 to 1890 and won 2 career singles titles.

== Career ==
Edith was born in December 1861 in Staines-upon-Thames Middlesex, England with her birth registered at Windsor.

She played her first tournament at the Derbyshire Championships in Buxton in 1884 where she lost in the second round. She competed at the Wimbledon Championships only one time. In the women's singles event her best result came in 1885 when she reached the semi finals, but was defeated by Blanche Bingley.

Her other career singles highlights include winning her first singles title at the Middlesex Championships at Chiswick in 1885 against Blanche Bingley. She won her second and final singles title at the North of England Championships at Scarborough in 1889 against Beatrice Wood. In addition she was also a finalist at the Middlesex Championships in 1887 losing to Dorothy Patterson, and at the first Kent Championships for women in 1888 where she lost to May Jacks.

In women's doubles events she was a losing finalist at the West of England Championships in 1885 partnering Grace Gibb. In 1887 she took part in the mixed doubles event at the Cannes Championships in Cannes, France partnering Harry Grove but they were defeated by Constance Bryan and Ernest Renshaw. Edith died in September 1939 age 77 with the death registered at Windsor.

== Family ==
She married an Arthur Frederick Blake in 1886 with the marriage registered at Windsor.
