= Staffordshire Tennis Championships =

Defunct tennis tournament
- Event name: Staffordshire County Cricket Club Lawn Tennis Tournament (1878–1885); Staffordshire Lawn Tennis Tournament(1886–1919); Staffordshire County Lawn Lennis Championships (1920–1950); Staffordshire Championships (1960–1972); Staffordshire Tennis Championships (1972–1984); Staffordshire Championships (1900-1960)
- Founded: 1878; 148 years ago
- Abolished: 1984; 42 years ago
- Location: Various Staffordshire, England
- Venue: Various
- Surface: Grass

The Staffordshire Tennis Championships or Staffordshire County Lawn Lennis Championships or simply Staffordshire Championships was combined men's and women's grass court tennis tournament founded in July 1878 as the Staffordshire County Cricket Club Lawn Tennis Tournament. That event was initially held at Litchfield, Staffordshire. From the mid-1880s to 1890s the tournament was known as the Staffordshire Lawn Tennis Tournament. In 1893 the Staffordshire Lawn tennis Association was formed. By the early 1920s it had become a county level event that ran until 1984.

== History ==
In July 1878 the Staffordshire County Cricket Club Lawn Tennis Tournament was held for the first time at the Staffordshire County Cricket Club grounds, Lichfield, Staffordshire, England. In 1886 the tournament moved to Coton Hall Institution grounds in Stafford, where it was renamed as the Staffordshire Lawn Tennis Tournament.

In 1920 the event was officially elevated to county level status and called the Staffordshire County Lawn Lennis Championships. In 1930 it changed venue to the Wolverhampton Lawn Tennis Club (f.1885). The championships were staged as an open international tour event until the late 1960s before being downgraded from the annual circuit. It was held up until at least 1984 as local county championships As of 2019 the Staffordshire Championships were still being staged.

== Venues ==
- Staffordshire County Cricket Ground, Lichfield
- Stafford Institute Lawn Tennis Club, Stafford(f.1885-1962)
- Wolverhampton Lawn Lennis Club, Wolverhampton
- Bilston Lawn Tennis Club (f.1895-2018), Bilston

== Event names ==
- Staffordshire County Cricket Club Lawn Tennis Tournament (1878–1885)
- Staffordshire Lawn Tennis Tournament(1886–1919)
- Staffordshire County Lawn Lennis Championships (1920–1950)
- Staffordshire Championships (1960–1972)
- Staffordshire Tennis Championships (1972–1984)

== Other tournaments ==
- Stafford Tennis Championships (1926–1961)
- Stafford Castle Lawn Tennis Tournament (1900–1936)
- Staffordshire Hard Court Championships (1935–1950)
