= Ealing Championships =

Defunct tennis tournament
- Tour: LTA Circuit (1884–1912)ILTF World Circuit (1913–19)
- Founded: 1884; 141 years ago
- Abolished: 2015; 10 years ago
- Location: Ealing, London, Great Britain
- Surface: Grass / outdoor

The Ealing Championships was a men's and women's grass court tennis tournament was founded in 1884 as the Ealing LTC Championships. The tournament was first played in Ealing Lawn Tennis & Archery Club, West Ealing, London Great Britain. It was played annually till 1919 when it was downgraded from the main ILTF World Circuit.

== History ==
In 1882 the "Ealing Lawn Tennis & Archery Club" was in West Ealing, London. In 1882 the club staged a precursor event called the Ealing LTC Open Tournament. In July 1884 it first staged the Ealing Lawn Tennis Club Championships. In 1908 the event was expanded to include to include the London Borough of Ealing and was named as the Ealing Championships. This tournament ran annually just after the World War I in 1919 when it was downgraded and became a more localised tennis event. The championships continued to be held as late as mid 1980s when it was known as the Ealing Tennis Championships The tournament survived until 2015 when it was abolished for the final time. Blanche Bingley became a member of the Ealing LTAC and, went onto to win five more titles at Wimbledon whilst representing the club. Other winners of the women's singles event include Charlotte Cooper who won 7 titles, Dorothea Douglass who won three times and Joan Reid-Thomas.

== See also ==
- Ealing Cricket Club Lawn Tennis Tournament
