= Natal Championships =

Defunct tennis tournament
- Founded: 1884
- Abolished: 1977 (men); 2005 (women)
- Editions: 93 (men); 121 (women)
- Location: Pietermaritzburg or Durban or Umhlali; KwaZulu-Natal, South Africa
- Surface: outdoor (Grass), later outdoor (hard)

The Natal Championships later known as the Natal Open Championships or simply Natal Open or was a men's and women's grass court tennis tournament held at Pietermaritzburg or Durban, KwaZulu-Natal, South Africa 1884 through 2005.

== History ==
The Natal Championships were founded in 1884 and first staged Pietermaritzburg, KwaZulu-Natal, South Africa. In 1885 it was then first staged at Durban after which the tournament alternated between both locations. In 1968 at the start of the Open era in tennis its title changed to the Natal Open for men which was the ATP Event and the Natal Open Championships for women which was a WTA Event in 1968. The event was staged at Umhlali during the final four years of the women's event. In later years the tournament had switched to hard courts. The event was usually run between the middle two weeks of July each year.
