= West of Scotland Championships =

Tournament information
- Tour: ILTF World Circuit (1924-83)
- Founded: 1882; 143 years ago
- Location: Glasgow, Lanarkshire, Scotland
- Venue: Newlands Lawn Tennis Club (1972-83)
- Surface: Grass

The West of Scotland Championships is a combined men's and women's grass court tennis tournament first established in 1882. During the 1970s an 1980s the championships were held at Newlands Lawn Tennis Club, Glasgow, Lanarkshire, Scotland until 1983.

== History ==
The first West of Scotland Championships were held between 3 and 8 July 1882. That year the organisers staged two events at the meeting, the West of Scotland open meeting and the Western Counties Championship closed meeting. The West of Scotland Championships were won by Englands Walter William Chamberlain, and the Western Counties Championship was won by Scotlands Edward Mortimer Shand.

The tournament ran under that name until 1969. In 1970 the tournament was renamed as the West of Scotland Open Tennis Championships. In 1972 the whisky company Hepburn & Ross who make the Red Hackle whisky brand took over sponsorship of the event and it was called the Red Hackle West of Scotland Championships till 1980. In 1981 the Glasgow based distilling firm Robertson & Baxter Group took over sponsorship of the event, and the tournaments was marketed as the Lang's West of Scotland Championships until 1983.

The championships are still being held today as part of the Scottish Lawn Tennis Association circuit now called Tennis Scotland under the brand name the West of Scotland Open Championships.

== Event name ==
- West of Scotland Championships (1882-1969)
- West of Scotland Open Tennis Championships (1970-1972)
- Red Hackle West of Scotland Championships (1973-1978)
- Lang's West of Scotland Championships (1981-1983)

== See also ==
- Tennis in Scotland
