= South of Scotland Championships =

Tournament information
- Tour: Scottish LTA
- Founded: 1882; 143 years ago
- Location: Moffat, Dumfriesshire, Dumfries and Galloway, Scotland
- Surface: Grass

The South of Scotland Championships also known as the South of Scotland Lawn Tennis Championships is a men's and women's grass court tennis tournament first staged in 1882 at the Beachgrove Grounds, Moffat, Dumfriesshire, Scotland. The championships ran as part of the ILTF World Circuit until 1969. Today its part regional Tennis Scotland circuit.

== History ==
South of Scotland Championships was first held in the early 1880s on the grass courts of Beechgrove Lawn Tennis Club in Moffat in Southern Scotland. No tournament was held in the years 1895-1907 due to Moffat being the host for the Scottish Lawn Tennis Championships. The championships ran as part of the international worldwide tour until 1967.

Since no longer a part of the worldwide tennis tour a smaller South of Scotland Championships tournament is no longer held at Beechgrove Tennis Club in Moffat due to the lack of support from the club. It has been moved to the nearby Dumfries Tennis Club, who now fully support the event and are trying to grow it back up what it used to be. The modern tournament is held on hard courts.

== Venue ==
The grounds at Beechgrove were laid out in 1870. The original Beechgrove Lawn Tennis Club in Moffat was one of the founding members of the Scottish Lawn Tennis Association (now Tennis Scotland) in 1895.
