= Laura Forster =

Australian nurse, physician and surgeon (1858–1917)

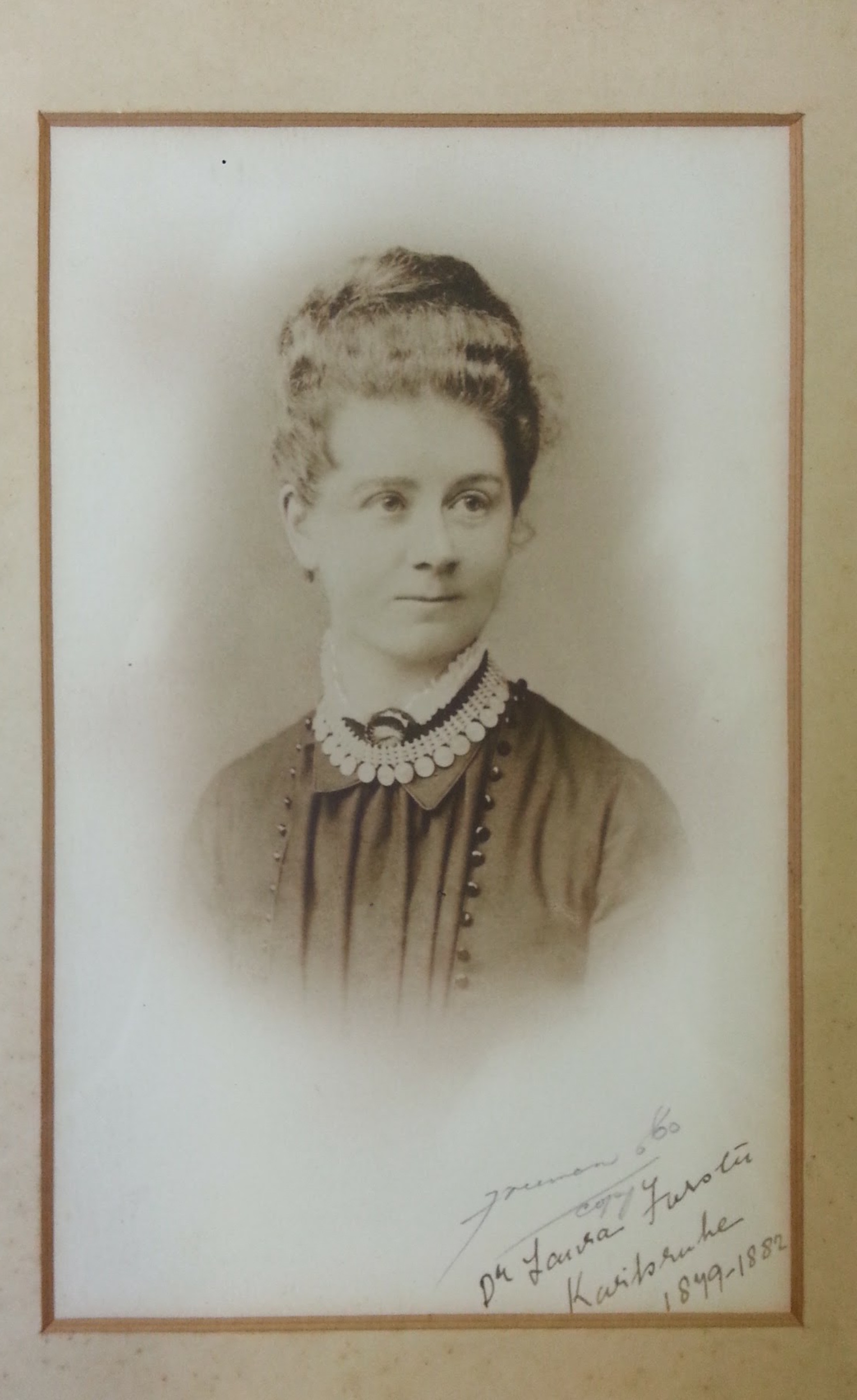
Laura E. Forster at the age of 21 in Germany.

Laura Elizabeth Forster (1858–1917) was an Australian medical doctor, surgeon and nurse noted for her service in France, Belgium, Turkey and Russia during World War I.

== Early life and education ==
Laura Elizabeth Forster was born in the Sydney suburb of Ryde in 1858 to William Forster (1818-1882), a landowner, poet, politician and Premier of New South Wales during 1859–1860, and his wife Eliza Jane Wall (1828-1862). Laura was the fifth of six children from this marriage. Eliza died in 1862 and William married Maud Julia Edwards (1846-1893). With Maud, William had five children, including three sons who were killed in World War I while with the Australian Imperial Force. Shortly after William Forster's death in 1882, Laura accompanied her stepmother and half sister, Enid, to England. Maud eventually married John Burn Murdoch, of Edinburgh, and a captain in the Royal Engineers. Laura remained in England.

Forster attended Sydney schools through about 1879. On 1 November 1887, Forster entered the University of Bern in Switzerland, as a medical student. At Bern University, she studied 12 semesters at the Pathological Institute researching muscle spindle fibers. She graduated in 1894 and was certified to practice medicine in the United Kingdom the following year.

== Career ==
After completing dual training as both a doctor and a nurse, Forster settled in England and practiced medicine in Oxford. She was also licensed by the Royal College of Physicians and Surgeons, Glasgow; Royal College of Physicians, Edinburgh; and Royal College of Surgeons, Edinburgh. In 1900, she was appointed medical officer of the Cutler Boulter Dispensary in Oxford. While at Cutler Boulter, she was interested in determining the causes and effects of ovarian diseases in mentally ill women. At the Claybury Asylum pathology laboratory in London, she performed autopsies on about 100 deceased women received from London and Charing Cross hospitals. In 1907, she published a research paper on the histology of tubercular human lymphatic glands under the supervision of Dr. Gustav Mann.

The influence of Gustav Mann (experienced in histological staining) together with her interest to gain a greater command of neurohistological techniques prompted Laura Forster to spend a few months between 1910 and 1911 at the Cajal´s laboratory (since 1920, Instituto Cajal) located in Madrid (Spain). At that time, Dr. Santiago Ramón y Cajal was beginning to be a prestigious and recognized scientist internationally in the world of Neurohistology, thanks to the international awards that he received between 1900 and 1906, including the Nobel Prize (1906). In 1911, under Cajal supervision, Forster published her third scientific paper (Foster, 1911) developed in Cajal's laboratory that was written completely in Spanish language. On the front page of this publication, she writes a brief introduction in Spanish: "by indication of professor Cajal, in whose laboratory I had the honour to work during some months". Laura Forster declares that Santiago Ramón y Cajal suggested she focused her research in the lab on whether the degeneration of nerve fibers after traumatic lesion of the spinal cord in birds corresponded with events observed in previous studies on mammals performed by Cajal himself and others. Forster's study was the first time that neurofibrillary techniques were applied to birds for this purpose and her results demonstrated similarities with the process in mammals, although these occurred more rapidly in birds. This paper, elegantly illustrated, is dated August 1911 and was the longest of her scientific papers to date. She expresses "cordial thanks to Dr. Cajal for his amicable advice, as well as to Drs N. Achúcarro and F. Tello for the generous help that they gave me while performing this work" (Forster, 1911). Afterwards, Cajal cited the work carried out by Laura Forster's in his laboratory at least three times. She can be considered as a pioneer woman Neuroscientist.

In 1912, at the outbreak of the First Balkan War, she travelled to Epirus to work as a nurse because women were not permitted to work as physicians at the front.

=== War service ===
In September 1914 during World War I she began working for the British Red Cross at Belgian Field Hospital in Antwerp. She was the first Australian female doctor to travel to Belgium to assist in the wartime medical effort, at a time women doctors were not allowed to enlist in the Allied Medical Corps. When Belgium came under German bombardment in September and October 1914, Forster and her colleagues evacuated Belgian and British soldiers under heavy fire. Following the devastating bombing by German aircraft, she went to France, where she assisted Belgians who had been wounded in the German bombardment. She then relocated to Russia and volunteered in the surgical department of Petrograd's largest hospital, where she was the first Australian or British female surgeon to perform surgery. She remained at the hospital for several months before joining the Russian Red Cross to serve in the Caucasus. From there, she went to Erzurum, Turkey, where she supervised a field hospital. Through the Caucasian Committee of the All-Russian Union of Towns, which operated 11 medical-related facilities, Forster managed a 150-bed infectious diseases hospital. The facility treated Typhus, which took by the end of the summer of 1916 an estimated 70 percent of the 40,000 infected refugees, soldiers and residents of the city. In September 1916 she joined a hospital unit financed by the National Union of Women's Suffrage Societies, which funded its operations for the wounded and refugees with donations from Britain's wealthy establishment. She was then placed in charge of a hospital in Zalishchyky, Galicia.

At Zalishchyky, the National Union of Women's Suffrage Societies operated the Millicent Fawcett Hospital Units, named for the famed suffragette in England. The Zalishchyky unit was one of five hospitals in the Galicia region. The doctor and nursing staff treated thousands of civilian refugees for typhoid, scarlet fever, dysentery and for farming accidents involving heavy equipment. In addition to civilians, the staff treated wounded Russian soldiers return from the front just 30 miles away. In December 1916, Forster transferred to the unit's 80-bed Fifty-Second Epidemic Hospital, in Zalishchyky, Galicia. She joined Dr. Helena Hall to replace Dr. Kate King May-Atkinson, who was returning to England to raise more funds for the operation. The medical facility was attached to the Russian Ninth Army but later transferred to the Seventh Army under General Aleksei Brusilov.

== Death ==
At 58 years old, the 20-hour days, constant bombardment and huge influx of the sick and wounded took a toll on Forster as she often looked exhausted and thin. She died on 11 February 1917 in Zalishchyky, from heart failure following a week-long illness with influenza. She was buried in Zalishchyky with Russian rites, which included burial in an open coffin and Russian Orthodox Church icons. Nurses from the hospital that Forster ran placed a homemade Union Jack flag over her body. Dr. Frederick Mott published Forster’s Claybury Asylum pathology laboratory findings posthumously in 1917.
