= Olive M. Aldridge =

English nurse and social reformer (1866–1950)

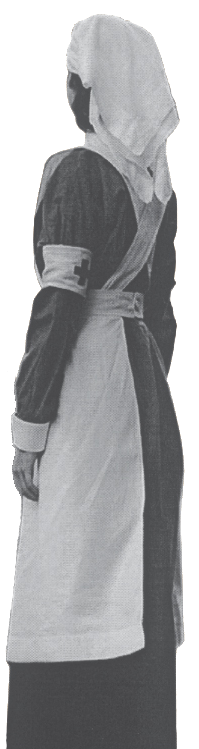
- Aldridge, c. 1915
- Born: Olive Mary Frisby; 15 May 1866; Battle, East Sussex, England
- Died: 31 October 1950 (aged 84); Surrey, England
- Occupations: Nurse; social reformer; suffragist; writer
- Notable work: The Retreat from Serbia through Montenegro and Albania (1916)
- Spouse: Henry R. Aldridge (m. 1894)
- Awards: Albanian Commemorative Medal

Olive Mary Aldridge (née Frisby; 15 May 1866 – 31 October 1950) was an English nurse, social reformer, suffragist, and writer. She worked with labour and women's organisations, including the Manchester and Salford Women's Trades Union Council and the Land Nationalisation Society. During the First World War, she served in the First Serbian-English Field Hospital and took part in the Great Retreat through Montenegro and Albania in 1915. She later returned to the Balkans with the Scottish Women's Hospitals for Foreign Service. Her wartime memoir, The Retreat from Serbia through Montenegro and Albania, was published in 1916.

== Biography ==
=== Early life ===
Aldridge was born Olive Mary Frisby on 15 May 1866 in Battle, East Sussex. Her parents were George William Frisby (1840–1924) and Mary Anne Frisby (née Eldridge; 1833–1902).

=== Trade union and reform work ===
Aldridge was active in the Manchester and Salford Women's Trades Union Council and served as its organising secretary in the early 20th century. Sources on the council describe her work in efforts to unionise low-paid women workers and record her membership of the organising committee for the 1906 Sweated Industries Exhibition.

Aldridge was also a suffragist. A programme reproduced in The Ethical Movement in Great Britain lists her among the speakers at a women's group event, where she gave a talk titled "The Right of Married Women to engage in Paid Work".

Aldridge later served as secretary of the Land Nationalisation Society. In September 1918, she began working with her husband, Henry R. Aldridge, founding secretary of the National Housing and Town Planning Council, at the council's office in Russell Square, Bloomsbury.

=== First World War ===
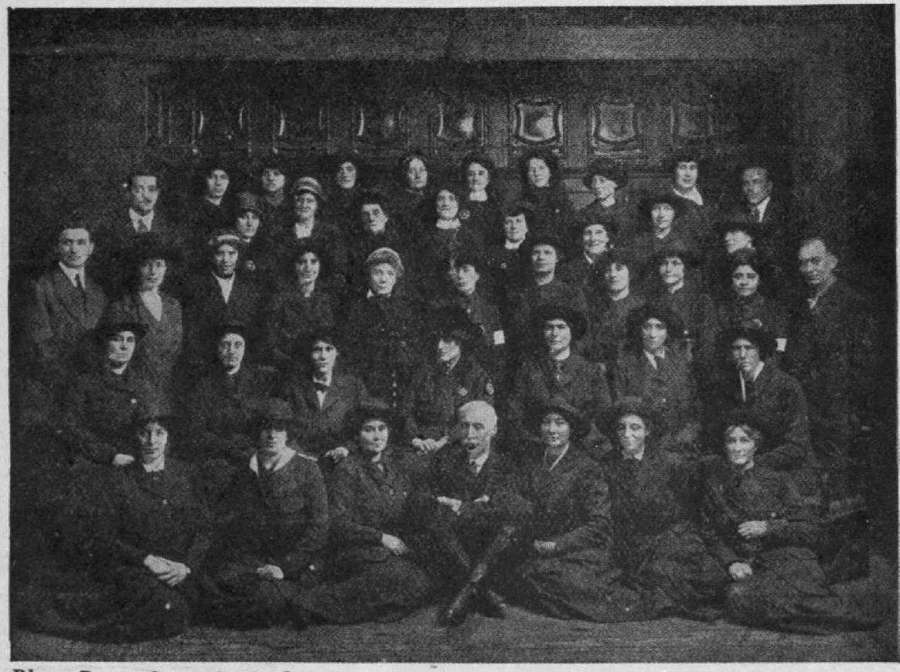
Members of the First Serbian-English Field Hospital

Aldridge served as a nurse in the First Serbian-English Field Hospital, the Serbian Relief Fund's 3rd Serbian Relief Unit, during the second half of 1915. She arrived shortly before the Serbian Army's autumn retreat and took part in the evacuation through Montenegro and Albania. Her book The Retreat from Serbia through Montenegro and Albania describes conditions in Serbia and the retreat of the British women attached to the Serbian army. She was later awarded the Albanian Commemorative Medal for her service.

In February 1916, Aldridge addressed the Women's Freedom League at Caxton Hall on "Our Retreat from Serbia". She was also an organiser for the Scottish Women's Hospitals for Foreign Service. She returned to the Balkans in December 1916 and remained there until October 1917.

=== Personal life and death ===
She married Henry R. Aldridge in 1894. Aldridge died in Surrey on 31 October 1950, aged 84.

== Later republication and exhibitions ==
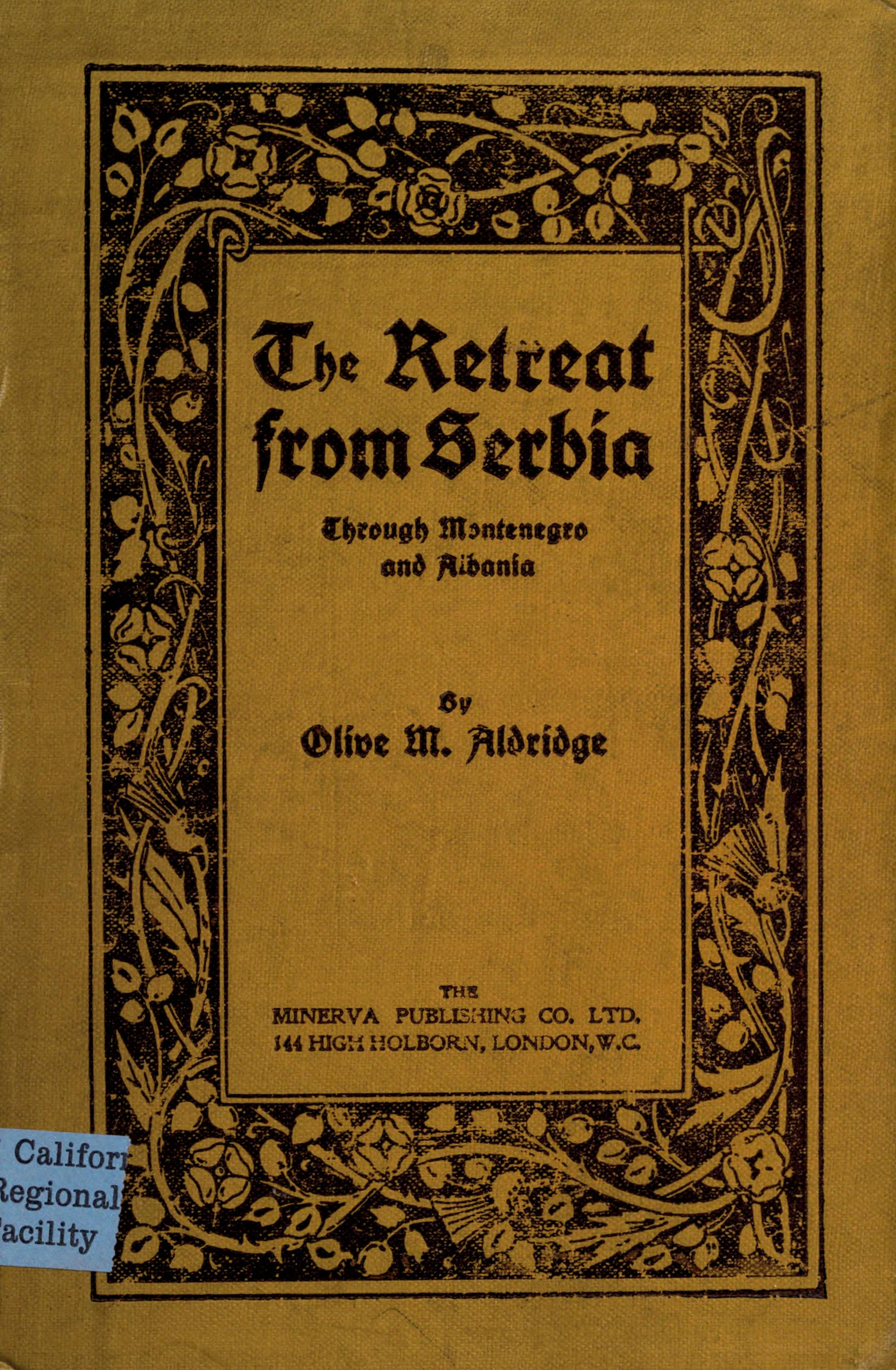
The Retreat From Serbia Through Montenegro and Albania (1916)

In 2014, Aldridge's The Retreat from Serbia through Montenegro and Albania was republished by Leonaur in a combined edition with Monica Stanley's My Diary in Serbia, under the title The Stobart Nurses: Accounts of British Volunteer Nurses During the First World War.

In 2018, the Kragujevac National Library "Vuk Karadzic" announced the "Stobart Hospital" project, which included Serbian translations of writings by Aldridge, Monica Stanley and Mabel Dearmer, and a planned exhibition on the British humanitarian mission led by Mabel St Clair Stobart in Kragujevac in 1915. A report in Politika stated that Aldridge's memoir was to appear in translation with Stanley's diary and Dearmer's letters in a volume issued as part of the project.

Aldridge was among the British nurses featured in the exhibition Bolnica Stobart – Kragujevac 1915 ("Stobart Hospital – Kragujevac 1915"), created by Tatjana Jankovic from material on the work of Mabel St Clair Stobart's medical unit in Serbia in 1915. The exhibition was shown at the Leskovac Cultural Center in 2019 and at the Filip Visnjic National Library in Bijeljina in 2020, the latter in cooperation with the Vuk Karadzic National Library in Kragujevac. Reports on the exhibition state that Aldridge's account of the retreat from Serbia was one of the sources used to present the history of the hospital, along with works by Stobart, Monica Stanley and Mabel Dearmer.

The Imperial War Museums' Lives of the First World War project includes a profile of Aldridge that records her wartime service with British medical and relief organisations in Serbia during the First World War.

== Works ==
- The Retreat from Serbia through Montenegro and Albania. London: Minerva Publishing Company. 1916.

== See also ==
- Women in World War I
- Women in the Victorian era
- Women's suffrage in the United Kingdom
