= Women's Sick and Wounded Convoy Corps =

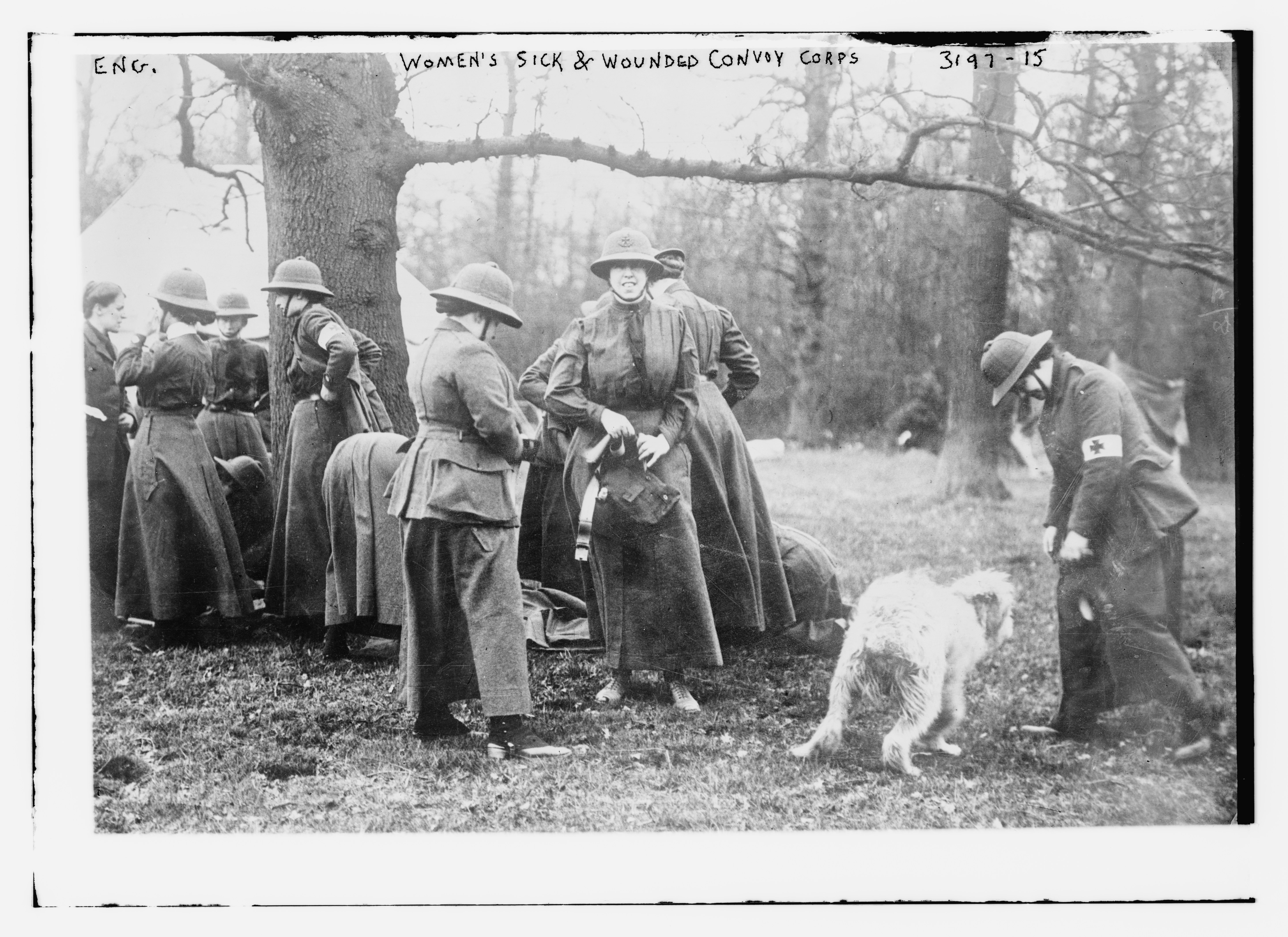
Women's Sick and Wounded Convoy Corps, 1910

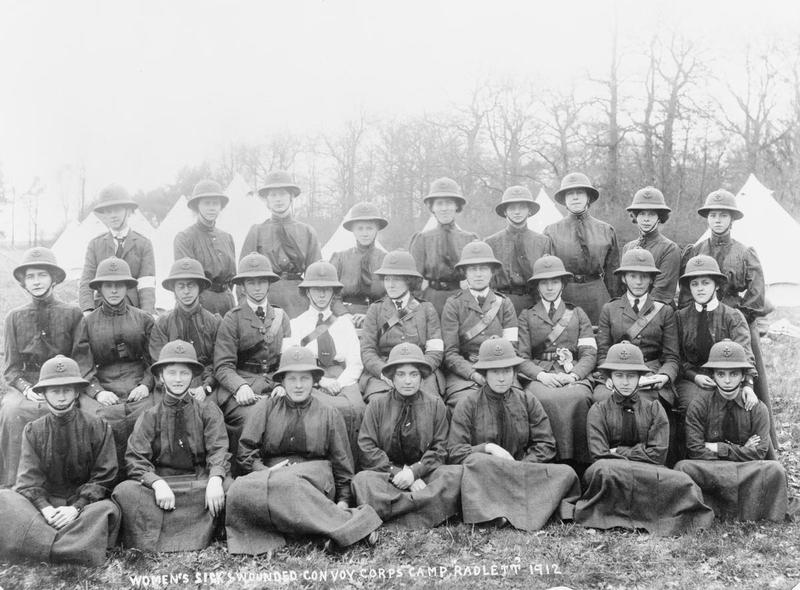
Women's Sick and Wounded Convoy Corps, 1912

Women's Sick and Wounded Convoy Corps (WSWCC) was a British women's medical organization established in 1910 by Mabel St Clair Stobart. The WSWCC would be entirely female. Most of the initial members of the corps came from First Aid Nursing Yeomanry that Stobart took with her after her falling out with the organisation. Initially, fifty women joined the WSWCC. The training regime was a combination of traditional medical training, basic military skills such as signaling, and horseback riding. The WSWCC held its first public demonstration in May 1910. Another training camp was held the next year in 1911.

The WSWCC was organised into service companies under strict military orders. It was claimed that in case of war, a well-trained body of women could take the field with twenty-four hours' notice, fully uniformed and equipped for hospital work and campaign hardships. Riding, camp and hospital cooking, bicycling, home nursing, laundry work, signaling, and stretcher drill were included in the training. Riding drills were held monthly. Particular attention was paid to dietary kitchen methods, and the preparation of simple meals for the sick and wounded as a practical consideration. The training in every department was thorough and modern for its time.
