= Monica Stanley =

English hospital cook in WWI

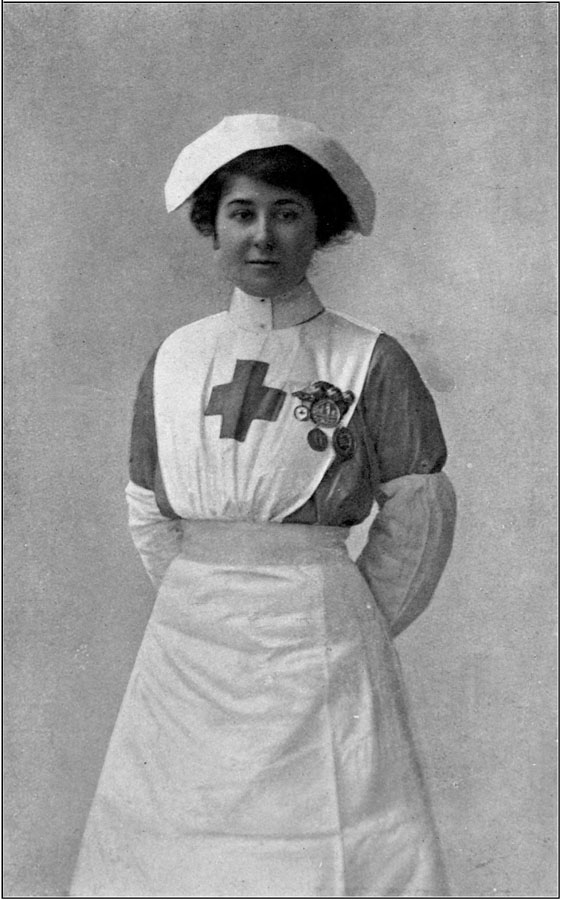
Monica Stanley in 1915

Monica Maria Stanley (1879–25 July 1972) was a British teacher, who served as hospital head cook with the Stobart Field Hospital in Serbia during World War I. Her diary of her time in Serbia was published in 1916.

== Life ==
Stanley was born in 1879 in Marple, Cheshire. Her parents were Dane Stanley and Flora Middleton Stanley and she was the youngest of four children. Stanley trained in domestic science at Battersea Polytechnic and later worked as a domestic science teacher. She married Leon Daviel in 1927. Stanley died in London on 25 July 1972.

== Serbia ==
In May 1915, Stanley took a three-month leave from her job, which was later extended to six months in view of her important work, to travel with the Women’s Imperial Service League to establish a field hospital at Kragujevac. The hospital was established by Mabel Stobart and overseen by Kate King-May. Stanley was in charge of provisioning and overseeing the kitchen.

In the summer of 1915, Stanley contracted typhus and was treated at the Berry Unit in Kragujevac, then the British Fever Hospital in Belgrade. She transferred from running the kitchen to handling the field hospital’s accounts. After being evacuated during a shelling attack in August, she returned to England in October.

== Diary ==
Stanley published an account of the time, My Diary in Serbia, which is useful for study of the field hospital and the experience of women volunteers in the Balkan front, including writer and illustrator Mabel Dearmer, who died of typhoid during her time there. Stanley's position as head cook and provisioner means her diary also gives a glimpse into Serbian food practices at the time.
