= Mabel and Kate King-May =

English frontline doctors in WWI

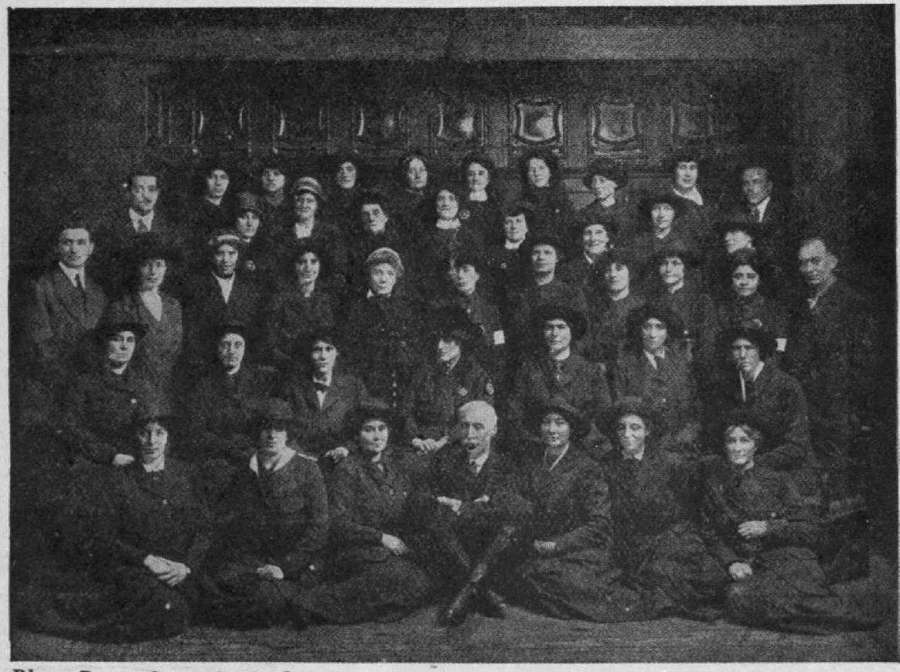
Stobart's Serbian Relief Fund Unit 3, picturing in the second row Mabel King-May (left), Mabel Stobart (centre), and Kate Atkinson (fourth from left).

Mabel Eliza King-May (born 1874) and Kate King-May Atkinson (1876–1933) were English medical doctors who joined Mabel St Clair Stobart’s all-women medical expedition to Serbia during World War I. They helped to set up and run a hospital camp there, remaining in charge of it when Stobart departed in 1916. When the camp was threatened by fighting, the women escaped to Montenegro, and Mabel and Kate continued their medical service on different fronts. After the war, they worked as medical officers in Manchester.

== Education ==
The sisters were both educated at Leeds Girls’ Grammar School and the University of Manchester, where Mabel was vice-president of the Medical Students' Representative Council in 1906–7 and gained her MB ChB in March 1911. Kate graduated in 1914.

== Pre-war careers ==
Along with her university friends Margrieta Beer, Eva Gore-Booth and Esther Roper, Kate campaigned against labour laws which excluded women from their historical trades. She spent a month working as a pit brow woman to prove that the work was not harmful for women, and published 'Statement of an Amateur Pit Brow Worker' about her experiences in 1911.

In 1912, Kate married Charles Ernest Atkinson in Durban, South Africa.

After their graduation, Mabel was resident medical officer to Rochdale Municipal Maternity and Infants Hospital, while Kate held resident appointments at Oldham Royal Infirmary and St Mary's Hospital, Manchester.

== WWI ==
Kate was a drill sergeant from 1909 to 1914.

In April 1915, the sisters went to Serbia as part of Mabel St Clair Stobart’s 3rd Serbian Relief Fund Unit and worked at the camp hospital they established in Kragujevac. Mabel, serving as senior surgeon, returned to England from May to July to raise funds and acquire equipment. When Stobart had to leave Kragujevac after six months, Mabel remained in charge of the camp. Their time in Serbia was recorded in Stobart's memoir and the diary of the hospital's head cook, Monica Stanley. The diary records the doctors working from tents, serving as a dispensary for civilians, and escaping an air-raid in June 1915. Kate attended to Stanley when she suffered from gastritis. When fighting began again in 1916, the women evacuated, making a 300-mile trek across Kosovo and Montenegro in freezing temperatures.

In 1916–7, Mabel was senior medical officer to the Unit for the Relief of Refugees in Russia and medical administrator to the Millicent Fawcett Hospitals there. Meanwhile, Kate worked on the Galician Front as senior medical officer to the 52nd Epidemic Hospital.

== Post-war ==
After the war, Kate was assistant medical officer to the massage and electrical department at Manchester Royal Infirmary and house physician to Greengate Dispensary in Salford. She was medical officer for child welfare in Manchester, and Mabel was assistant medical officer for maternity and child welfare.
