= Mabel St Clair Stobart =

British suffragist and aid-worker

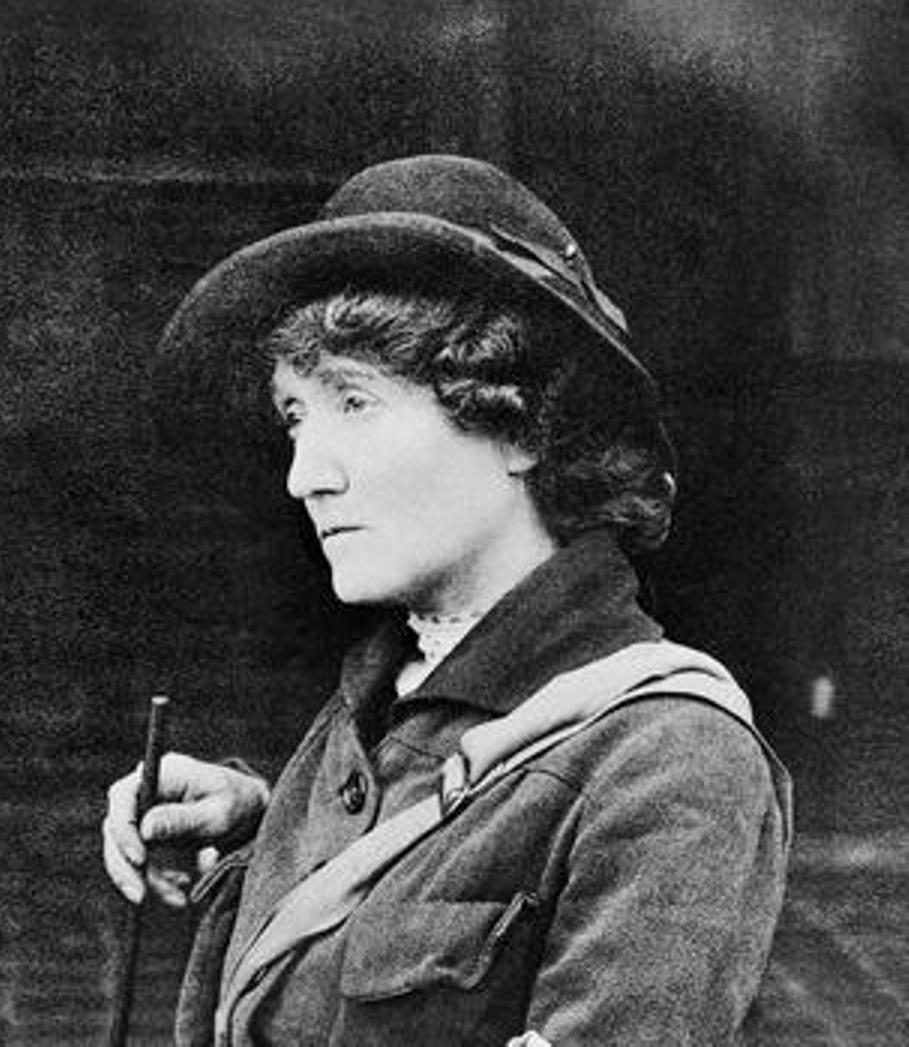
- Born: Mabel Annie Boulton; 3 February 1862; Woolwich, England
- Died: 7 December 1954 (aged 92); Bournemouth, England
- Other names: Stobart-Greenhalgh (after her 2nd marriage, in 1911)
- Known for: Suffragist, humanitarian

Mabel Annie St Clair Stobart (née Boulton; 3 February 1862 – 7 December 1954) was an English suffragist and aid-worker. She created and commanded all-women medical units to serve in the Balkan Wars and the First World War. She became the first woman to achieve the rank of Major in any national army. She was also the author of several books and articles.

== Early life ==
Born to a wealthy family, in 1862 in England, her parents were Sir Samuel Bagster Boulton and Sophia Louisa (née Cooper).

She was the third daughter in a family of five daughters and two sons. She was an avid golfer and tennis player and wrote a book on golf, plus several articles on fishing. She rebelled against the typical trappings of her upbringing, at one point refusing to be presented at the Royal Court.

She married St Clair Kelburn Mulholland Stobart (1861–1908), an Irish-born granite merchant on 16 July 1884. They had two sons: St Clair Eric was born in 1885 and Lionel was born in 1887; St Clair Eric tended to reverse his first two names in later life, presumably to avoid confusion and for simplicity. Her husband's financials started failing in 1902, and the family moved to Transvaal, in 1903, to set up a farm, in the aftermath of the Boer War. She also set up a trading-store, but the family soon decided to return to England.

She returned to Britain in 1907 settling in Studland Bay, in Dorset, whilst her husband remained in Transvaal to settle the business affairs. In the event, St Clair was not to return, as he died at sea on 9 April 1908 on his return journey to Britain.

A few years later, on 3 March 1911, Mabel Stobart remarried: to John Herbert Greenhalgh, a retired barrister. Unusually, for that time, both husband and wife were known to use the conjoined surname Stobart-Greenhalgh.

Once she returned to England, Stobart threw herself into the suffragette cause, attending many events and meetings. In 1913, she ran for the Westminster seat in the London County Council election, where she came in third with 1,199 votes. She ran on a platform of public housing for the working-class and increased emergency medical services.

== Women's Sick and Wounded Convoy Corps ==
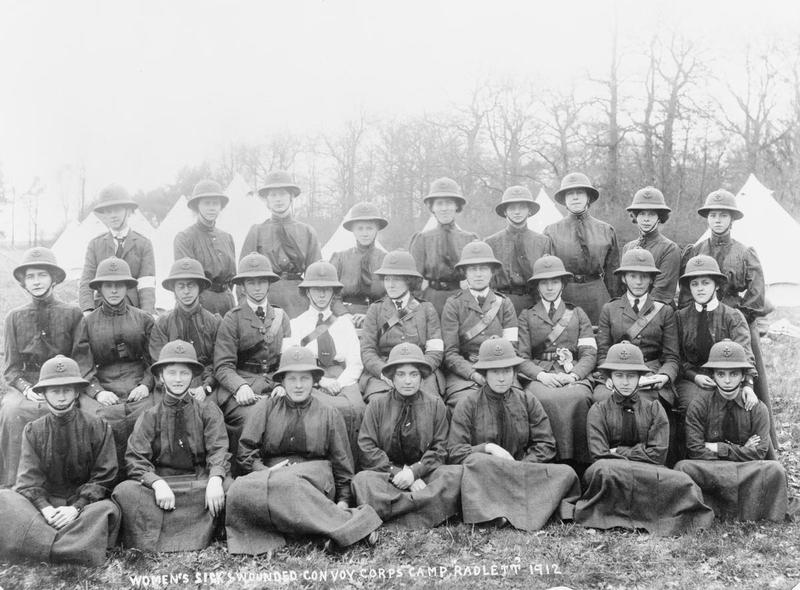
Group of the Women's Sick and Wounded Convoy Corps in Camp at Radlett in 1912. St Clair Stobart is sixth from left, centre row.

Stobart firmly felt that a major war was coming and women could contribute to this war effort by providing medical care along with other support activities. During her life, Stobart never had any official medical training. She initially joined the newly created First Aid Nursing Yeomanry (FANY) but left after a short time. She had issues with the funding of the organisation and the perceived view that it was not doing enough to promote women within the military. She soon founded the Women's Sick and Wounded Convoy Corps (WSWCC) in 1910.

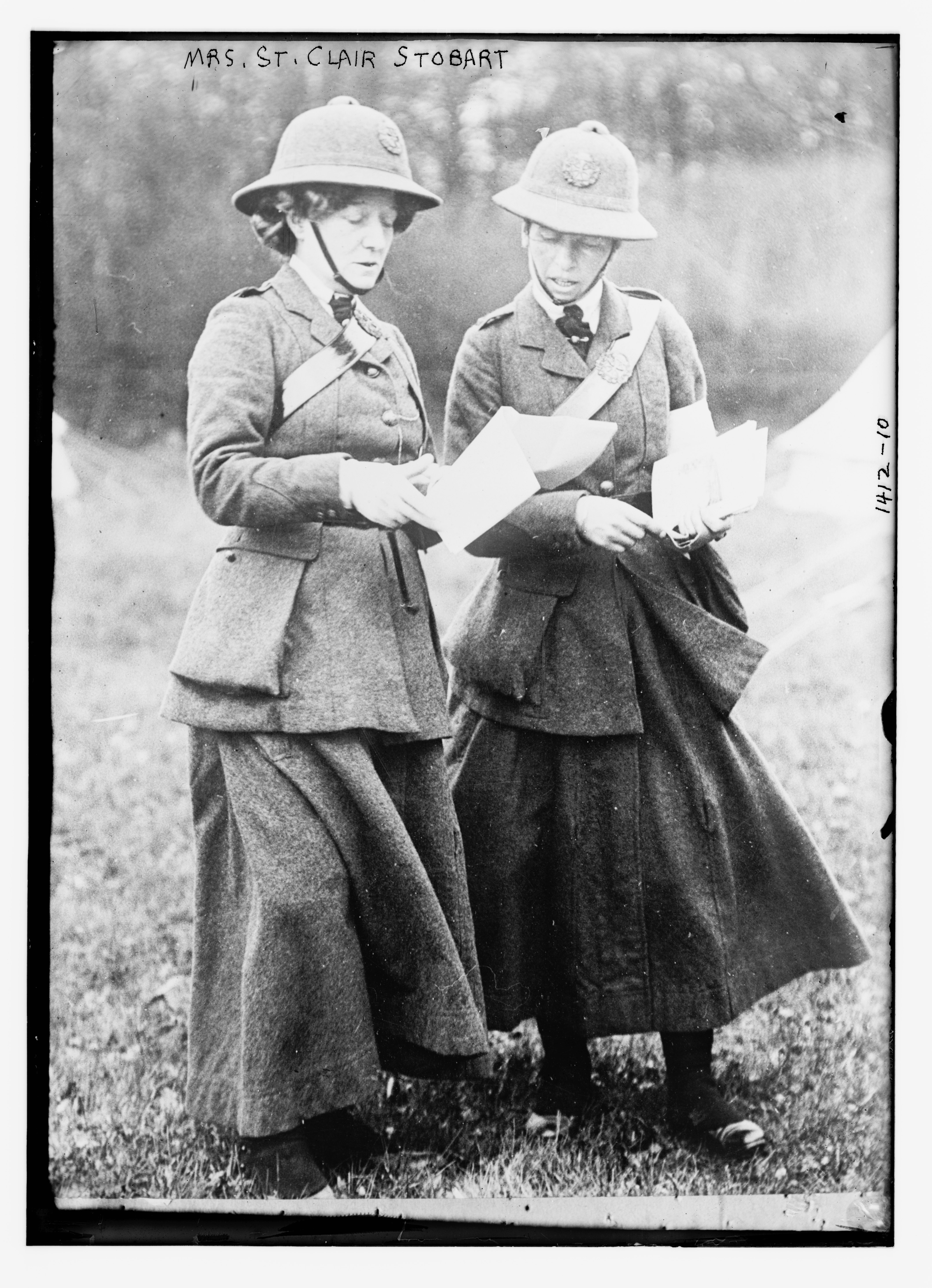
The WSWCC started training in 1910

The Balkan Wars broke out in October 1912 between the Ottoman Empire and former territories of Bulgaria, Greece, Montenegro, and Serbia. The British Red Cross Society (BRCS) had sent a team to the conflict, but explicitly did not send any women, as the society thought that the conditions would be "quite unsuitable for women." Stobart disagreed and sought a way for her Corps to be sent. She enlisted the help of Noel Buxton, an MP and Chairman of the Balkan War Relief Committee. Stobart approached Buxton at a club and he suggested she travel with him in a few days to make her case directly to the Bulgarian government. Stobart quickly arranged her unit in two days. They would stay in England and await word from her if they received permission.

After travelling on the Orient Express, Stobart, her husband, Noel Buxton and his brother, Charles Buxton, MP, all arrived in Sofia, Bulgaria. Stobart received a positive response from the head of the Bulgarian Red Cross, but permission of the head of the military medical division was still needed. Rather than waiting for him, Stobart set off to the front to see him. After giving an impassioned speech about British women, Stobart was granted permission for her unit to come and be "...near the front as possible".

Stobart cabled the news to the unit in England, and three women doctors, six fully trained nurses, and four trained helpers, along with three cooks, travelled to Sofia, Bulgaria. After arriving, they were dispatched to the front lines near Kırklareli. After seven days of travel on ox across mountainous terrain, they arrived and set up operations. The unit spent five weeks in the country, treating the wounded and sick until the armistice was signed.

When she arrived back in England, she published a book about the WSWCC and women in war. The book, War and women, from experience in the Balkans and elsewhere, was dedicated to the Tsaritsa (Queen) of Bulgaria, Eleonore Reuss of Köstritz. The Tsaritsa had been a nurse during the war and had made a personal donation of bedding and supplies for the WSWCC unit.

Stobart went on a visit to Canada for three months. During her time away, the members of the WSWCC decided that the unit should be incorporated with the British Red Cross Society. Stobart strongly protested and left the organisation she founded.

== First World War ==
=== In Belgium ===
Britain declared war on Germany on 4 August 1914. Stobart travelled to Brussels on 18 August 1914, arriving on the evening of the 19th, and sent a cable instructing the unit to come out immediately. They immediately started converting university buildings that had been allocated for use as a hospital by her unit on the 20th. At 2pm, she followed a crowd to the Boulevard des Jardins Botaniquese, and witnessed the German Army making a triumphant entry to and taking possession of the capital of Belgium, foolishly taking photos. Realising the situation, Stobart tried to find means to communicate with her unit. After persistent effort, Stobart was able to gain a passport from the German General, to Venlo in Holland, leaving at 6 p.m. on 24 August, reading Louvain (Leuven) at 8pm, and travelling on the next morning at 5 a.m. (Louvain was destroyed the following day) to Hasselt at 8 a.m.

After taking breakfast the motorcade would not restart, and upon repeated inspection of their passports, they were arrested as spies, surrounded by soldiers who were ordered to cock rifles, fix bayonets, and shoot if they moved or talked to each other. After an hour they were marched to a hotel, their luggage was searched and they themselves were strip searched, before being marched to the railway station at 5 p.m. along with eighteen members of the Garde Civique and six criminals, and loaded onto a dirty coal truck, which traveled until around 7 p.m., arriving in Tongres.

There, an anti-English commanding officer whom Stobart labelled the 'devil-major' stated that a map and camera were enough for them to be condemned as spies, for whom the fate was to be shot within twenty-four hours. While trying to explain their case, Stobart was shocked by the comment, "You are English, and whether you are right or wrong, this is a war of annihilation." They spent the night, after arguing to not be separated as women were not allowed to sleep with men (the party consisting of her husband, the chaplain and a poor Belgian chauffeur who had been caught up in the affair).

A sympathetic officer, who was married to an English woman, entered the room, and promised to do everything in his power to help, in return for conveying to his wife that all was well for him. He was interrupted and sternly removed by the 'devil major'. The following morning, the devil major, frustrated by intervention in his planned dawn entertainment of an execution, irately made arrangements to transfer the four prisoners to Cologne to be tried for high treason.

During the journey, the news of their transfer proceeded them, and at Liège they were removed from the train, and the officers who did so had in mind to try the English 'spies' themselves. As the train was to leave, Stobart was able to compel one of their guards to show the officer the orders for them to be transferred to Cologne. On production of the papers, the officer resisted, and allowed them to re-board the train, but crucially, without their papers which were the proof of their story. Their journey ended in Aachen (Aix-la-Chappelle) at 8 p.m., and they were marched to a barracks prison and presented to a judge separately.

The only evidence that remained was a cutting from the Morning Post which stated "Mrs St. Clair Stobart had that day left for Brussels at the invitation of the Belgian Red Cross, to establish a hospital for French and Belgian soldiers."

Before being once again removed to the prison for the night. The following evening, she was brought before the judge in the prison, who offered her to board in a hotel, if she gave her word not to attempt to escape, while he investigated her statements. Stobart answered that she would, only if her companions were extended the same courtesy, to which she was told that they already had done so, and was courteously taken to the hotel, and allocated an officer to supervise their parole. After some confusing telegrams, their innocence was decided, and upon asking of their desired destination, the judge allowed them to return to London, via Flushing.

On return to London, Stobart then took her unit to the siege of Antwerp, in response to a request received via Lord and Lady Esher.

Following the exploits in Antwerp, Stobart established a hospital at the Château Tourlaville near Cherbourg, which operated during 1914–1915, but, bored of the tedious work away from the front, left the hospital she had established and sought a new challenge.

=== In Serbia ===
==== First Serbian-English Field Hospital ====
As a result of the war and its effects, epidemic typhus broke out in Serbia, causing the death of around 150,000 people including about half of the doctors in the country. Stobart, along with several other medical units from the Red Cross, went to the affected area.

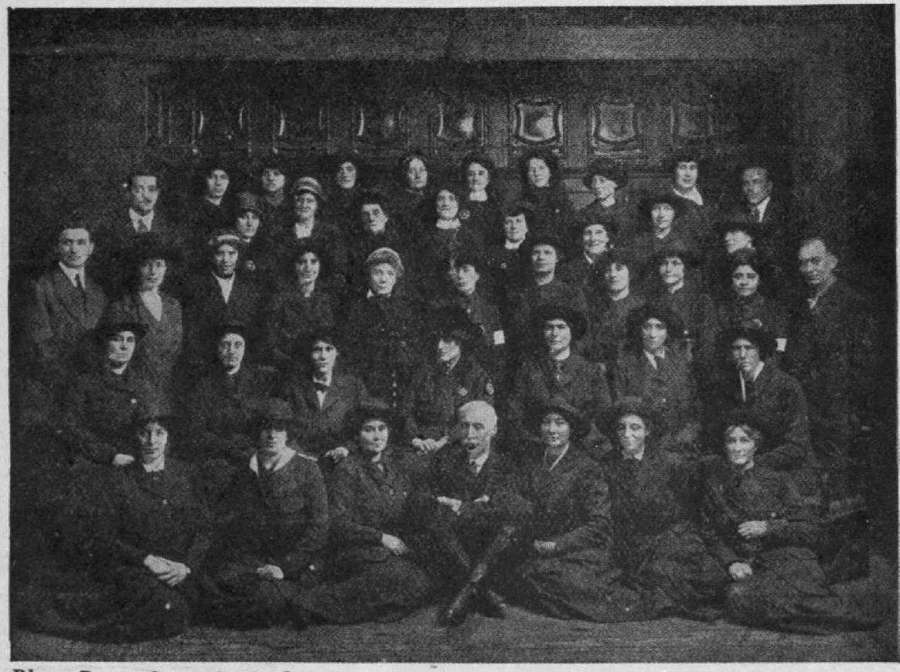
With the exception of a few men, all of the Serbian Relief Fund unit No. 3 were women

Stobart's actions caught the attention of the Royal Serbian Army. The medical division, in late September 1915, asked Stobart to command a frontline field hospital. Along with some doctors and nurses, sixty soldiers would be under her command. To suit this position, she was given the rank of Major, which made her the first known woman with the rank of major in the world. The unit was to be called the First Serbian-English Field Hospital (front).

The war was not going too well for Serbia in the autumn of 1915. Bulgaria had joined the war against Serbia. After fierce fighting, the army along with civilians made the retreat through neutral Albania. The retreat was a complete shambles with terrible cold weather, mud-bound roads, constant enemy attacks, and lack of food and other supplies. Estimates put the costs at well-over 250,000 soldiers dying or missing. There is no estimate on the number of civilians that died.

Stobart arrived at the front with her unit right before the start of the retreat. Her unit was one of the last units to start the dangerous crossing of the mountains but was able to stick together with little loss.

In 1916, Stobart wrote The Flaming Sword in Serbia and Elsewhere, an account of her ordeal in Serbia illustrated with her own photographs and undertook British lecture tours, donating the proceeds to the Serbian Red Cross.

=== Later travels ===
After America entered the war in April 1917, Stobart travelled to North America - the United States and Canada - for a lecture tour arranged through the British Ministry of Information, followed by a lecture tour in Ireland in late 1918.

== Spiritualism and later life ==
In 1918, Stobart was awarded custody of her two granddaughters whose parents had died in the influenza epidemic and in 1928 her elder son and her husband died. As a result of these losses and her wartime experiences, Stobart became a key figure in Spiritualism, becoming involved in various spiritualist organisations and writing several books and pamphlets on the subject including Ancient Lights (1923) and Torchbearers of Spiritualism (1925).

Stobart became chair of the British College of Psychic Science and in 1924, Stobart founded and became Chairman of the Spiritualist Community and fellow spiritualist Arthur Conan Doyle served as president until his death in July 1930. Stobart served as the chair of the Spiritualist Community Countil from 1924 to 1941 and also joined the council of the World Congress of Faiths.

In 1935, Stobart published her autobiography, Miracles and Adventures: An Autobiography.

Stobart spent most of her remaining life at her house in Studland, Dorset. Stobart died on 7 December 1954 at the age of 92.

== Written works ==
- War and women, From Experience in the Balkans and Elsewhere 1913. London, G. Bell & Sons, Ltd.
- The Flaming Sword in Serbia and Elsewhere 1916. London; New York: Hodder and Stoughton.
- Ancient Lights (or, The Bible, The church and psychic science). 1923. London: Kegan Paul.
- Torchbearers of Spiritualism. 1925.
- The either or of spiritualism. 1928. London: Rider & Co.
- The Apocrypha Reviewed by a Spiritualist. 1930. London: Kegan Paul.
- Psychic Bible Stories for young & old. 1933?. London: Wright & Brown.
- Miracles and Adventures. An Autobiography. 1935. London: Rider & Co.

== See also ==
- People on Scottish banknotes
- Elsie Inglis Memorial Maternity Hospital
- Scottish Women's Hospitals for Foreign Service
- Eveline Haverfield – British suffragette and aid worker (1867–1920)
- Elizabeth Ness MacBean Ross – Scottish physician (1878 - 1915)
- Leila Paget – British humanitarian
- Elsie Inglis – Scottish doctor (1864–1917)
- Josephine Bedford – Australian philanthropist and WWI ambulance driver (1861-1955)
- Katherine Harley – British suffragist
- Isabel Emslie Hutton – Scottish physician (1887–1960)
- Olive M. Aldridge – English nurse and social reformer (1866–1950)
